= 2024–25 Orlando Magic season =

- Division champions
- Head coach: Jamahl Mosley
- General manager: Anthony Parker
- Owners: RDV Sports, Inc.
- Arena: Kia Center

Results
- Record: 41–41 (.500)
- Place: Division: 1st (Southeast); Conference: 7th (Eastern)
- Playoff finish: First round (lost to Celtics 1–4)
- Stats at Basketball Reference

Local media
- Television: FanDuel Sports Network Florida
- Radio: 96.9 The Game

The 2024–25 Orlando Magic season was the 36th season for the franchise in the National Basketball Association (NBA). This was Orlando's fourth season with Jamahl Mosley as head coach.

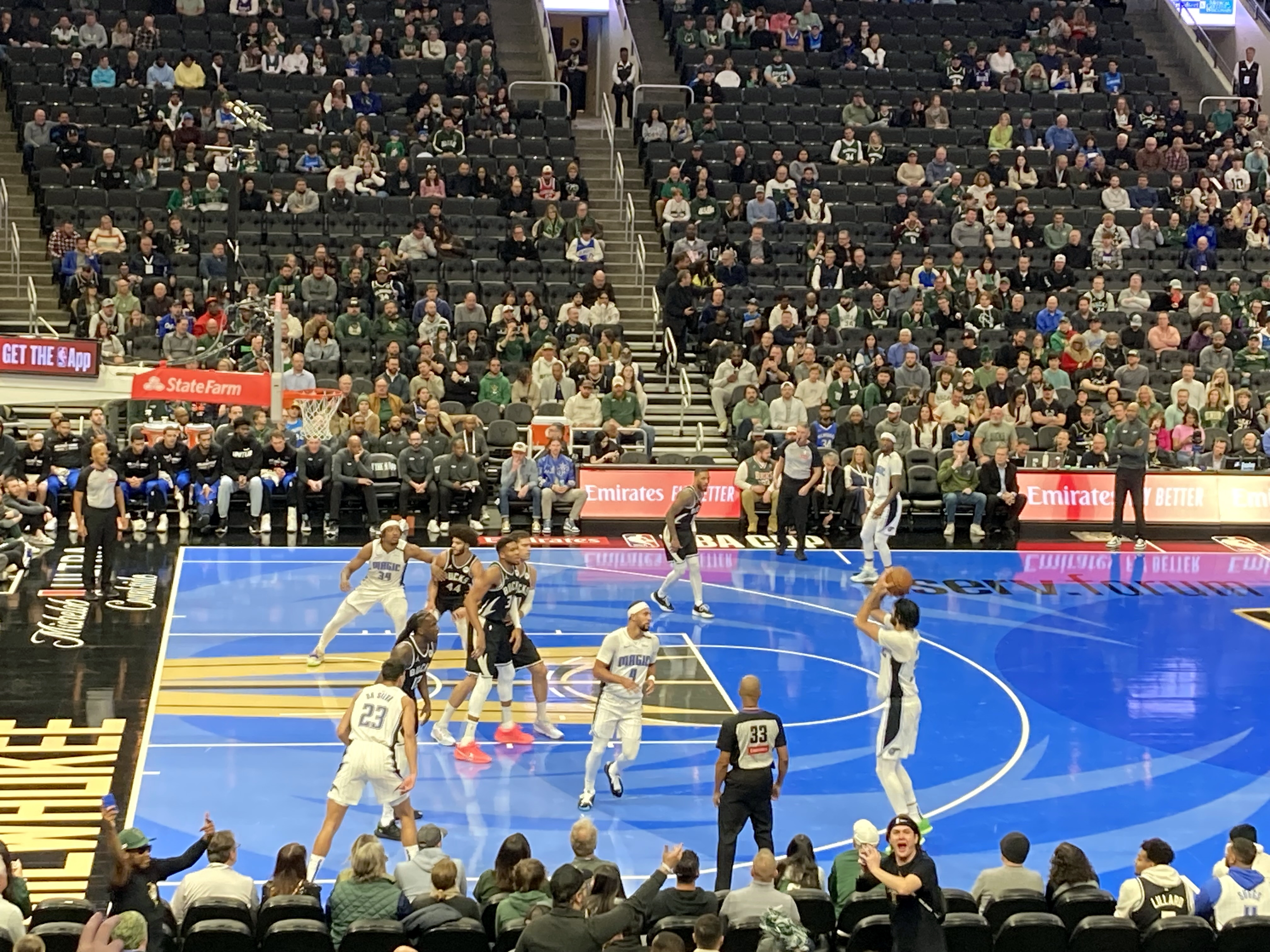
The Magic playing at Milwaukee during the 2024 NBA Cup quarterfinals

The Magic advanced to the 2024 NBA Cup knockout stage as the East's wildcard team, having finished the group stage with the highest point differential among all second placers in the conference. However, they were eliminated by the eventual Cup champions Milwaukee Bucks in the quarterfinals.

With a loss to the Houston Rockets on March 10, 2025, the Magic would collect their 36th loss on the season and fail to improve on their win total from their previous season. On April 4, the Magic would be locked in to a play-in berth following the Detroit Pistons' victory over the Toronto Raptors. On April 9, the Magic would clinch the Southeast division for the second straight season following a victory over the defending champion Boston Celtics.

On April 15, the Magic clinched a playoff berth for the second consecutive year after defeating the Atlanta Hawks in the first stage of the play-in tournament, securing the seventh seed. However, they once again lost in the first round, this time to the Celtics in five games.

The Orlando Magic drew an average home attendance of 18,587, the 13th-highest of all NBA teams.

== Draft ==
Round	Pick	Player	Position	Nationality	College / team
1	18	Tristan da Silva	SF	Germany; Brazil	Colorado
2	47	Antonio Reeves	SG	United States	Kentucky

The Magic had one first-round pick and one second-round pick entering the draft. For the first time in franchise history, the Magic worked on the NBA draft for two straight days instead of one day like it had been since the franchise first existed back in 1989. On the first night of the draft, the Magic would select the German-Brazilian small forward Tristan da Silva from the University of Colorado. Then, on the second day of the draft, Orlando would select shooting guard Antonio Reeves from the University of Kentucky.

== Roster ==
2024–25 Orlando Magic roster
Players

Pos.	No.	Player	Height	Weight	DOB	From
G	50	Cole Anthony	6 ft 2 in (1.88 m)	185 lb (84 kg)	2000-05-15	North Carolina
F	5	Paolo Banchero	6 ft 10 in (2.08 m)	250 lb (113 kg)	2002-11-12	Duke
C	35	Goga Bitadze	6 ft 10 in (2.08 m)	250 lb (113 kg)	1999-07-20	Georgia
G	0	Anthony Black	6 ft 7 in (2.01 m)	200 lb (91 kg)	2004-01-24	Arkansas
G	3	Kentavious Caldwell-Pope	6 ft 5 in (1.96 m)	204 lb (93 kg)	1993-02-18	Georgia
C	34	Wendell Carter Jr.	6 ft 10 in (2.08 m)	270 lb (122 kg)	1999-04-16	Duke
F	23	Tristan da Silva	6 ft 8 in (2.03 m)	217 lb (98 kg)	2001-05-15	Colorado
G	14	Gary Harris	6 ft 4 in (1.93 m)	210 lb (95 kg)	1994-09-14	Michigan State
F	2	Caleb Houstan	6 ft 8 in (2.03 m)	205 lb (93 kg)	2003-01-09	Michigan
F	13	Jett Howard	6 ft 6 in (1.98 m)	215 lb (98 kg)	2003-09-14	Michigan
F	1	Jonathan Isaac	6 ft 10 in (2.08 m)	230 lb (104 kg)	1997-10-03	Florida State
G	10	Cory Joseph	6 ft 2 in (1.88 m)	200 lb (91 kg)	1991-08-20	Texas
G	8	Mac McClung (TW)	6 ft 2 in (1.88 m)	185 lb (84 kg)	1999-01-06	Texas Tech
G	12	Trevelin Queen (TW)	6 ft 5 in (1.96 m)	190 lb (86 kg)	1997-02-25	New Mexico State
G	4	Jalen Suggs	6 ft 5 in (1.96 m)	205 lb (93 kg)	2001-06-03	Gonzaga
G	55	Ethan Thompson (TW)	6 ft 5 in (1.96 m)	195 lb (88 kg)	1999-05-04	Oregon State
F	22	Franz Wagner	6 ft 10 in (2.08 m)	220 lb (100 kg)	2001-08-27	Michigan
F/C	21	Moritz Wagner (injured)	6 ft 11 in (2.11 m)	245 lb (111 kg)	1997-04-26	Michigan

Coaches
Head coach
- Jamahl Mosley
Assistant(s)
- Ameer Bahhur
- Jeremiah Boswell
- Bret Brielmaier
- Lionel Chalmers
- Randy Gregory
- Jesse Mermuys
- Dale Osbourne

Legend
- (DP) Unsigned draft pick
- (FA) Free agent
- (S) Suspended
- (GL) On assignment to G League affiliate
- (TW) Two-way affiliate player
- Injured

Roster
Updated: December 14, 2024

== Standings ==
=== Division ===
Southeast Division	W	L	PCT	GB	Home	Road	Div	GP
y – Orlando Magic	41	41	.500	–	22‍–‍19	19‍–‍22	12‍–‍4	82
pi – Atlanta Hawks	40	42	.488	1.0	21‍–‍19	19‍–‍23	10‍–‍6	82
x – Miami Heat	37	45	.451	4.0	19‍–‍22	18‍–‍23	10‍–‍6	82
Charlotte Hornets	19	63	.232	22.0	12‍–‍29	7‍–‍34	1‍–‍15	82
Washington Wizards	18	64	.220	23.0	8‍–‍33	10‍–‍31	7‍–‍9	82

=== Conference ===
Eastern Conference
#	Team	W	L	PCT	GB	GP
1	c – Cleveland Cavaliers *	64	18	.780	–	82
2	y – Boston Celtics *	61	21	.744	3.0	82
3	x – New York Knicks	51	31	.622	13.0	82
4	x – Indiana Pacers	50	32	.610	14.0	82
5	x – Milwaukee Bucks	48	34	.585	16.0	82
6	x – Detroit Pistons	44	38	.537	20.0	82
7	y – Orlando Magic *	41	41	.500	23.0	82
8	pi – Atlanta Hawks	40	42	.488	24.0	82
9	pi – Chicago Bulls	39	43	.476	25.0	82
10	x – Miami Heat	37	45	.451	27.0	82
11	Toronto Raptors	30	52	.366	34.0	82
12	Brooklyn Nets	26	56	.317	38.0	82
13	Philadelphia 76ers	24	58	.293	40.0	82
14	Charlotte Hornets	19	63	.232	45.0	82
15	Washington Wizards	18	64	.220	46.0	82

== Game log ==
=== Preseason ===
During the preseason, the Magic would play their final games under what was previously named Bally Sports Florida. Bally Sports would rebrand itself to the FanDuel Sports Network as of October 21, 2024, before the start of the regular season.

2024 preseason game log
Total: 1–2 (Home: 1–0; Road: 0–2)
Preseason: 1–2 (home: 1–0; road: 0–2)

Game	Date	Team	Score	High points	High rebounds	High assists	Location Attendance	Record
1	October 7	@ New Orleans	L 104–106	Paolo Banchero (15)	Goga Bitadze (9)	Anthony Black (4)	Smoothie King Center; 17,687	0–1
2	October 9	@ San Antonio	L 97–107	Jett Howard (19)	Goga Bitadze (11)	Paolo Banchero (7)	Frost Bank Center; 16,952	0–2
–	October 11	New Orleans	Canceled due to Hurricane Milton					
3	October 18	Philadelphia	W 114–99	Paolo Banchero (21)	Bitadze, Carter Jr. (7)	Anthony Black (8)	Kia Center; 18,846	1–2

2024–25 preseason schedule

=== Regular season ===
2024–25 game log
Total: 41–41 (Home: 22–19; Road: 19–22)
October: 3–2 (home: 2–0; road: 1–2)

Game	Date	Team	Score	High points	High rebounds	High assists	Location Attendance	Record
1	October 23	@ Miami	W 116–97	Paolo Banchero (33)	Wendell Carter Jr. (14)	Cole Anthony (6)	Kaseya Center; 19,630	1–0
2	October 25	Brooklyn	W 116–101	Franz Wagner (29)	Wendell Carter Jr. (11)	Paolo Banchero (9)	Kia Center; 19,087	2–0
3	October 26	@ Memphis	L 111–124	Franz Wagner (23)	Wendell Carter Jr. (10)	Banchero, Black, Suggs, F. Wagner (3)	FedExForum; 17,809	2–1
4	October 28	Indiana	W 119–115	Paolo Banchero (50)	Paolo Banchero (13)	Paolo Banchero (9)	Kia Center; 18,846	3–1
5	October 30	@ Chicago	L 99–102	Paolo Banchero (31)	Banchero, Carter Jr. (7)	Anthony Black (6)	United Center; 19,015	3–2

November: 11–5 (home: 7–0; road: 4–5)

Game	Date	Team	Score	High points	High rebounds	High assists	Location Attendance	Record
6	November 1	@ Cleveland	L 109–120	Jalen Suggs (28)	Suggs, F. Wagner (8)	Jalen Suggs (7)	Rocket Mortgage FieldHouse; 19,432	3–3
7	November 3	@ Dallas	L 85–108	Franz Wagner (13)	F. Wagner, M. Wagner (6)	Franz Wagner (6)	American Airlines Center; 19,977	3–4
8	November 4	@ Oklahoma City	L 86–102	Franz Wagner (22)	Goga Bitadze (9)	Jalen Suggs (6)	Paycom Center; 17,044	3–5
9	November 6	@ Indiana	L 111–118	Franz Wagner (28)	Goga Bitadze (12)	Black, Suggs, F. Wagner (6)	Gainbridge Fieldhouse; 16,218	3–6
10	November 8	New Orleans	W 115–88	Franz Wagner (27)	Goga Bitadze (9)	Franz Wagner (6)	Kia Center; 18,565	4–6
11	November 10	Washington	W 121–94	Franz Wagner (23)	Goga Bitadze (12)	Franz Wagner (7)	Kia Center; 18,352	5–6
12	November 12	Charlotte	W 114–89	Franz Wagner (32)	Franz Wagner (8)	Franz Wagner (5)	Kia Center; 17,541	6–6
13	November 13	Indiana	W 94–90	Franz Wagner (29)	Goga Bitadze (12)	Black, F. Wagner (6)	Kia Center; 17,087	7–6
14	November 15	Philadelphia	W 98–86	Franz Wagner (31)	Franz Wagner (11)	Franz Wagner (6)	Kia Center; 17,843	8–6
15	November 18	@ Phoenix	W 109–99	Franz Wagner (32)	Goga Bitadze (10)	Anthony Black (9)	Footprint Center; 17,071	9–6
16	November 20	@ L.A. Clippers	L 93–104	Anthony Black (17)	Franz Wagner (6)	Anthony Black (8)	Intuit Dome; 16,563	9–7
17	November 21	@ L.A. Lakers	W 119–118	Franz Wagner (37)	Goga Bitadze (15)	Franz Wagner (11)	Crypto.com Arena; 18,997	10–7
18	November 23	Detroit	W 111–100	Franz Wagner (30)	Jonathan Isaac (12)	Franz Wagner (8)	Kia Center; 19,094	11–7
19	November 25	@ Charlotte	W 95–84	Franz Wagner (21)	Anthony, M. Wagner (8)	Franz Wagner (7)	Spectrum Center; 14,898	12–7
20	November 27	Chicago	W 133–119	Jalen Suggs (31)	Goga Bitadze (11)	Jalen Suggs (7)	Kia Center; 18,309	13–7
21	November 29	@ Brooklyn	W 123–100	Franz Wagner (29)	Franz Wagner (8)	Franz Wagner (8)	Barclays Center; 18,143	14–7

December: 6–7 (home: 4–4; road: 2–3)

Game	Date	Team	Score	High points	High rebounds	High assists	Location Attendance	Record
22	December 1	@ Brooklyn	W 100–92	Franz Wagner (20)	Goga Bitadze (13)	Franz Wagner (8)	Barclays Center; 16,505	15–7
23	December 3	@ New York	L 106–121	Franz Wagner (30)	Moritz Wagner (12)	Franz Wagner (6)	Madison Square Garden; 19,812	15–8
24	December 4	@ Philadelphia	W 106–102	Franz Wagner (35)	Franz Wagner (7)	Anthony Black (7)	Wells Fargo Center; 19,851	16–8
25	December 6	@ Philadelphia	L 94–102	Franz Wagner (30)	Carter Jr., M. Wagner (9)	Franz Wagner (5)	Wells Fargo Center; 19,802	16–9
26	December 8	Phoenix	W 115–110	Jalen Suggs (26)	Goga Bitadze (16)	Goga Bitadze (4)	Kia Center; 18,311	17–9
27	December 10	@ Milwaukee	L 109–114	Jalen Suggs (32)	Goga Bitadze (14)	Wendell Carter Jr. (5)	Fiserv Forum; 17,341	17–10
28	December 15	New York	L 91–100	Moritz Wagner (32)	Goga Bitadze (11)	Jalen Suggs (8)	Kia Center; 17,029	17–11
29	December 19	Oklahoma City	L 99–105	Anthony Black (23)	Wendell Carter Jr. (13)	Kentavious Caldwell-Pope (5)	Kia Center; 18,896	17–12
30	December 21	Miami	W 121–114	Cole Anthony (35)	Goga Bitadze (13)	Cole Anthony (9)	Kia Center; 18,080	18–12
31	December 23	Boston	W 108–104	Tristan da Silva (18)	Goga Bitadze (9)	Anthony, Suggs (5)	Kia Center; 18,846	19–12
32	December 26	Miami	L 88–89	Jalen Suggs (29)	Goga Bitadze (14)	6 players (2)	Kia Center; 18,846	19–13
33	December 27	New York	L 85–108	Jalen Suggs (27)	Goga Bitadze (11)	4 players (3)	Kia Center; 18,961	19–14
34	December 29	Brooklyn	W 102–101	Tristan da Silva (21)	Goga Bitadze (11)	Tristan da Silva (7)	Kia Center; 19,397	20–14

January: 4–11 (home: 2–5; road: 2–6)

Game	Date	Team	Score	High points	High rebounds	High assists	Location Attendance	Record
35	January 1	@ Detroit	L 96–105	Jalen Suggs (24)	Wendell Carter Jr. (8)	Goga Bitadze (6)	Little Caesars Arena; 19,399	20–15
36	January 3	@ Toronto	W 106–97	Tristan da Silva (25)	Goga Bitadze (13)	Cole Anthony (11)	Scotiabank Arena; 19,278	21–15
37	January 5	Utah	L 92–105	Jett Howard (21)	Goga Bitadze (11)	Trevelin Queen (6)	Kia Center; 19,198	21–16
38	January 6	@ New York	W 103–94	Cole Anthony (24)	Jonathan Isaac (9)	Anthony Black (5)	Madison Square Garden; 19,812	22–16
39	January 9	Minnesota	L 89–104	Goga Bitadze (15)	Tristan da Silva (9)	Cole Anthony (5)	Kia Center; 18,846	22–17
40	January 10	Milwaukee	L 106–109	Paolo Banchero (34)	Tristan da Silva (10)	Banchero, Caldwell-Pope, Carter Jr. (3)	Kia Center; 18,846	22–18
41	January 12	Philadelphia	W 104–99	Cole Anthony (27)	Jonathan Isaac (11)	Banchero, Black (6)	Kia Center; 17,723	23–18
42	January 15	@ Milwaukee	L 93–122	Paolo Banchero (22)	Wendell Carter Jr. (10)	Cole Anthony (9)	Fiserv Forum; 17,341	23–19
43	January 17	@ Boston	L 94–121	Cole Anthony (23)	Wendell Carter Jr. (9)	Paolo Banchero (4)	TD Garden; 19,156	23–20
44	January 19	Denver	L 100–113	Wendell Carter Jr. (16)	Wendell Carter Jr. (13)	Anthony, Banchero, Black, Carter Jr. (5)	Kia Center; 18,846	23–21
45	January 21	@ Toronto	L 93–109	Paolo Banchero (26)	Paolo Banchero (12)	Tristan da Silva (4)	Scotiabank Arena; 18,284	23–22
46	January 23	Portland	L 79–101	Franz Wagner (20)	Paolo Banchero (9)	Paolo Banchero (6)	Kia Center; 19,422	23–23
47	January 25	Detroit	W 121–113	Banchero, F. Wagner (32)	Wendell Carter Jr. (11)	Banchero, F. Wagner (7)	Kia Center; 19,489	24–23
48	January 27	@ Miami	L 119–125 (2OT)	Franz Wagner (29)	Goga Bitadze (9)	Cole Anthony (7)	Kaseya Center; 19,600	24–24
49	January 30	@ Portland	L 90–119	Franz Wagner (24)	Wendell Carter Jr. (7)	Banchero, F. Wagner (3)	Moda Center; 16,217	24–25

February: 5–7 (home: 3–4; road: 2–3)

Game	Date	Team	Score	High points	High rebounds	High assists	Location Attendance	Record
50	February 1	@ Utah	L 99–113	Franz Wagner (37)	Goga Bitadze (8)	Paolo Banchero (6)	Delta Center; 18,175	24–26
51	February 3	@ Golden State	L 99–104	Cole Anthony (26)	Goga Bitadze (14)	Wendell Carter Jr. (7)	Chase Center; 18,064	24–27
52	February 5	@ Sacramento	W 130–111	Franz Wagner (31)	Wendell Carter Jr. (8)	Paolo Banchero (9)	Golden 1 Center; 18,074	25–27
53	February 6	@ Denver	L 90–112	Wendell Carter Jr. (19)	Paolo Banchero (8)	Banchero, Black, F. Wagner (4)	Ball Arena; 19,616	25–28
54	February 8	San Antonio	W 112–111	Franz Wagner (33)	Franz Wagner (12)	Paolo Banchero (6)	Kia Center; 19,354	26–28
55	February 10	Atlanta	L 106–112	Franz Wagner (37)	Franz Wagner (7)	Anthony Black (5)	Kia Center; 18,055	26–29
56	February 12	Charlotte	W 102–86	Paolo Banchero (24)	Wendell Carter Jr. (11)	Paolo Banchero (6)	Kia Center; 18,947	27–29
All-Star Game
57	February 20	@ Atlanta	W 114–108	Paolo Banchero (36)	Wendell Carter Jr. (15)	Banchero, F. Wagner (5)	State Farm Arena; 16,436	28–29
58	February 21	Memphis	L 104–105	Franz Wagner (25)	Wendell Carter Jr. (11)	Cole Anthony (7)	Kia Center; 18,945	28–30
59	February 23	Washington	W 110–90	Black, F. Wagner (23)	Bitadze, Carter Jr. (9)	Banchero, F. Wagner (5)	Kia Center; 18,712	29–30
60	February 25	Cleveland	L 82–122	Paolo Banchero (26)	Wendell Carter Jr. (6)	Anthony, Banchero, F. Wagner (4)	Kia Center; 18,846	29–31
61	February 27	Golden State	L 115–121	Paolo Banchero (41)	Wendell Carter Jr. (14)	Paolo Banchero (5)	Kia Center; 18,846	29–32

March: 7–8 (home: 2–6; road: 5–2)

Game	Date	Team	Score	High points	High rebounds	High assists	Location Attendance	Record
62	March 2	Toronto	L 102–104	Franz Wagner (25)	Wendell Carter Jr. (9)	Banchero, Carter Jr. (5)	Kia Center; 19,015	29–33
63	March 4	Toronto	L 113–114	Paolo Banchero (41)	Paolo Banchero (8)	Paolo Banchero (8)	Kia Center; 17,406	29–34
64	March 6	Chicago	L 123–125	Anthony, Banchero (20)	Paolo Banchero (9)	Franz Wagner (6)	Kia Center; 17,717	29–35
65	March 8	@ Milwaukee	W 111–109	Paolo Banchero (29)	Franz Wagner (7)	Cole Anthony (9)	Fiserv Forum; 17,815	30–35
66	March 10	@ Houston	L 84–97	Paolo Banchero (25)	Wendell Carter Jr. (12)	Franz Wagner (5)	Toyota Center; 16,665	30–36
67	March 13	@ New Orleans	W 113–93	Paolo Banchero (34)	Paolo Banchero (11)	Franz Wagner (5)	Smoothie King Center; 16,323	31–36
68	March 14	@ Minnesota	L 111–118	Paolo Banchero (43)	Paolo Banchero (10)	Franz Wagner (4)	Target Center; 18,978	31–37
69	March 16	@ Cleveland	W 108–103	Paolo Banchero (24)	Wendell Carter Jr. (14)	Paolo Banchero (7)	Rocket Arena; 19,432	32–37
70	March 19	Houston	L 108–116	Paolo Banchero (31)	Bitadze, F. Wagner (8)	Franz Wagner (7)	Kia Center; 19,609	32–38
71	March 21	@ Washington	W 120–105	Paolo Banchero (30)	Wendell Carter Jr. (12)	Anthony Black (6)	Capital One Arena; 18,317	33–38
72	March 24	L.A. Lakers	W 118–106	Franz Wagner (32)	Wendell Carter Jr. (8)	Franz Wagner (9)	Kia Center; 19,598	34–38
73	March 25	@ Charlotte	W 111–104	Paolo Banchero (32)	Wendell Carter Jr. (11)	Paolo Banchero (6)	Spectrum Center; 14,639	35–38
74	March 27	Dallas	L 92–101	Paolo Banchero (35)	Paolo Banchero (10)	Paolo Banchero (4)	Kia Center; 17,269	35–39
75	March 29	Sacramento	W 121–91	Paolo Banchero (24)	Goga Bitadze (10)	Banchero, Joseph (6)	Kia Center; 18,846	36–39
76	March 31	L.A. Clippers	L 87–96	Paolo Banchero (26)	Paolo Banchero (6)	Franz Wagner (6)	Kia Center; 17,522	36–40

April: 5–1 (home: 2–0; road: 3–1)

Game	Date	Team	Score	High points	High rebounds	High assists	Location Attendance	Record
77	April 1	@ San Antonio	W 116–105	F. Wagner, Banchero (24)	Paolo Banchero (10)	Franz Wagner (7)	Frost Bank Center; 17,770	37–40
78	April 3	@ Washington	W 109–97	Paolo Banchero (33)	Paolo Banchero (18)	Paolo Banchero (8)	Capital One Arena; 15,998	38–40
79	April 8	Atlanta	W 119–112	Paolo Banchero (33)	Paolo Banchero (10)	Franz Wagner (6)	Kia Center; 18,846	39–40
80	April 9	Boston	W 96–76	Franz Wagner (23)	Anthony, F. Wagner (8)	Paolo Banchero (6)	Kia Center; 19,128	40–40
81	April 11	@ Indiana	W 129–115	Trevelin Queen (25)	Goga Bitadze (7)	Anthony Black (7)	Gainbridge Fieldhouse; 17,010	41–40
82	April 13	@ Atlanta	L 105–117	Anthony Black (20)	Black, Isaac (10)	Tristan da Silva (6)	State Farm Arena; 17,714	41–41

2024–25 season schedule

=== Play-in ===
2025 play-in game log
Total: 1–0 (Home: 1–0; Road: 0–0)
Play-in: 1–0 (home: 1–0; road: 0–0)

Game	Date	Team	Score	High points	High rebounds	High assists	Location Attendance	Record
1	April 15	Atlanta	W 120–95	Cole Anthony (26)	Franz Wagner (13)	Paolo Banchero (7)	Kia Center; 18,846	1–0

2024–25 season schedule

=== Playoffs ===
2025 playoff game log
Total: 1–4 (home: 1–1; road: 0–3)
First Round: 1–4 (home: 1–1; road: 0–3)

Game	Date	Team	Score	High points	High rebounds	High assists	Location Attendance	Series
1	April 20	@ Boston	L 86–103	Paolo Banchero (36)	Wendell Carter Jr. (13)	Franz Wagner (5)	TD Garden; 19,156	0–1
2	April 23	@ Boston	L 100–109	Paolo Banchero (32)	Paolo Banchero (9)	Paolo Banchero (7)	TD Garden; 19,156	0–2
3	April 25	Boston	W 95–93	Franz Wagner (32)	Wendell Carter Jr. (12)	Franz Wagner (8)	Kia Center; 18,967	1–2
4	April 27	Boston	L 98–107	Paolo Banchero (31)	Wendell Carter Jr. (11)	Franz Wagner (7)	Kia Center; 19,073	1–3
5	April 29	@ Boston	L 89–120	Franz Wagner (25)	Wendell Carter Jr. (10)	Paolo Banchero (6)	TD Garden; 19,156	1–4

2025 playoff schedule

=== NBA Cup ===
The groups were revealed during the tournament announcement on July 12, 2024.

==== East Group A ====
Pos	Team	Pld	W	L	PF	PA	PD	Qualification
1	New York Knicks	4	4	0	455	425	+30	Advance to knockout stage
2	Orlando Magic	4	3	1	441	396	+45	Advance to knockout stage
3	Philadelphia 76ers	4	2	2	408	411	−3	
4	Brooklyn Nets	4	1	3	436	475	−39	
5	Charlotte Hornets	4	0	4	406	439	−33	

Source: NBA
Rules for classification: Tiebreakers

== Player statistics ==
=== Regular season ===
Player	POS	GP	GS	MP	REB	AST	STL	BLK	PTS	MPG	RPG	APG	SPG	BPG	PPG
Anthony Black	PG	78	10	1,887	230	240	86	48	736	24.2	2.9	3.1	1.1	.6	9.4
Kentavious Caldwell-Pope	SG	77	77	2,279	169	136	99	34	673	29.6	2.2	1.8	1.3	.4	8.7
Tristan da Silva	SF	74	38	1,629	245	113	33	18	533	22.0	3.3	1.5	.4	.2	7.2
Jonathan Isaac	PF	71	1	1,090	314	40	61	80	380	15.4	4.4	.6	.9	1.1	5.4
Goga Bitadze	C	70	42	1,430	463	137	49	98	502	20.4	6.6	2.0	.7	1.4	7.2
Wendell Carter Jr.	C	68	51	1,758	492	134	52	41	618	25.9	7.2	2.0	.8	.6	9.1
Cole Anthony	PG	67	22	1,234	204	191	45	32	630	18.4	3.0	2.9	.7	.5	9.4
Franz Wagner	SF	60	60	2,023	342	284	75	21	1,449	33.7	5.7	4.7	1.3	.4	24.2
Jett Howard	SF	60	0	701	70	44	13	11	267	11.7	1.2	.7	.2	.2	4.5
Caleb Houstan	SF	58	6	788	75	35	22	6	239	13.6	1.3	.6	.4	.1	4.1
Cory Joseph	PG	50	16	612	74	72	26	4	177	12.2	1.5	1.4	.5	.1	3.5
Gary Harris	SG	48	3	711	64	30	26	12	145	14.8	1.3	.6	.5	.3	3.0
Paolo Banchero	PF	46	46	1,582	345	219	36	28	1,191	34.4	7.5	4.8	.8	.6	25.9
Jalen Suggs	PG	35	35	1,002	141	129	51	33	567	28.6	4.0	3.7	1.5	.9	16.2
Trevelin Queen	SG	31	2	430	54	38	31	10	152	13.9	1.7	1.2	1.0	.3	4.9
Moritz Wagner	C	30	1	564	148	42	24	12	386	18.8	4.9	1.4	.8	.4	12.9
Mac McClung	SG	2	0	10	1	3	0	0	0	5.0	.5	1.5	.0	.0	.0

=== Playoffs ===
Player	POS	GP	GS	MP	REB	AST	STL	BLK	PTS	MPG	RPG	APG	SPG	BPG	PPG
Cole Anthony	PG	5	0	51	7	6	0	1	11	10.2	1.4	1.2	.0	.2	2.2
Paolo Banchero	PF	5	5	197	42	21	3	4	197	39.4	8.4	4.2	.6	.8	29.4
Anthony Black	PG	5	0	89	22	0	4	1	41	17.8	4.4	.0	.8	.2	8.2
Kentavious Caldwell-Pope	SG	5	5	163	15	9	7	3	25	32.6	3.0	1.8	1.4	.6	5.0
Wendell Carter Jr.	C	5	5	162	54	6	2	2	51	32.4	10.8	1.2	.4	.4	10.2
Gary Harris	SG	5	0	83	5	3	3	1	7	16.6	1.0	.6	.6	.2	1.4
Caleb Houstan	SF	5	0	47	4	1	0	1	6	9.4	.8	.2	.0	.2	1.2
Jonathan Isaac	PF	5	0	69	10	2	2	1	18	13.8	2.0	.4	.4	.2	3.6
Cory Joseph	PG	5	5	124	9	15	5	2	25	24.8	1.8	3.0	1.0	.4	5.0
Franz Wagner	SF	5	5	195	24	28	6	2	129	39.0	4.8	5.6	1.2	.4	25.8
Goga Bitadze	C	3	0	11	3	1	0	1	2	3.7	1.0	.3	.0	.3	.7
Tristan da Silva	SF	2	0	5	4	1	0	0	0	2.5	2.0	.5	.0	.0	.0
Jett Howard	SF	1	0	4	0	0	0	0	6	4.0	.0	.0	.0	.0	6.0

- ^{†} Denotes player spent time with another team in the season. Stats reflect time with the Magic only.

== Transactions ==
=== Trades ===
June 27, 2024	To Orlando Magic 2030 NOP second-round pick swap right 2031 NOP second-round pick swap right	To New Orleans Pelicans Draft rights to Antonio Reeves (No. 47)

=== Free agency ===
==== Re-signed ====
Date	Player	Signed	Ref.
July 5, 2024	Trevelin Queen	Two-way contract	
July 6, 2024	Goga Bitadze	3-year, $25 million	
July 6, 2024	Gary Harris	2-year, $15 million	
July 6, 2024	Jonathan Isaac	5-year, $84 million	
July 6, 2024	Moritz Wagner	2-year, $22 million	
July 6, 2024	Franz Wagner	5-year, $224 million	

==== Additions ====
Date	Player	Signed	Former Team	Ref.
July 6, 2024	Kentavious Caldwell-Pope	Denver Nuggets	Denver Nuggets	
July 19, 2024	Cory Joseph	Golden State Warriors	Golden State Warriors	

==== Subtractions ====
Date	Player	Reason left	New team	Ref.
June 28	Admiral Schofield	Free agency	LDLC ASVEL	
July 3	Joe Ingles	Free agency	Minnesota Timberwolves	
September 18	Kevon Harris	Free agency	Atlanta Hawks	
February 12	Markelle Fultz	Free agency	Sacramento Kings	
