= 2024–25 New Orleans Pelicans season =

- Head coach: Willie Green
- General manager: Bryson Graham
- Owner: Gayle Benson
- Arena: Smoothie King Center

Results
- Record: 21–61 (.256)
- Place: Division: 5th (Southwest); Conference: 14th (Western)
- Playoff finish: Did not qualify
- Stats at Basketball Reference

Local media
- Television: Gulf Coast Sports & Entertainment Network
- Radio: WRNO-FM

The 2024–25 New Orleans Pelicans season was the 23rd season of the New Orleans Pelicans franchise in the National Basketball Association (NBA). On August 8, 2024, the Pelicans announced that they would depart from Bally Sports New Orleans (which would shut down following Bally Sports' rebranding to the FanDuel Sports Network on October 21) to enter this season working with Gray Television owned stations around not just the state of Louisiana, but also parts of Mississippi and Alabama as well under the newly created Gulf Coast Sports & Entertainment Network.

On March 13, 2025, the Pelicans were eliminated from playoff contention following their loss to the Orlando Magic.

The New Orleans Pelicans drew an average home attendance of 16,815, the highest of all basketball teams from Louisiana.

== Draft ==
Round	Pick	Player	Position	Nationality	College / Club
1	21	Yves Missi	C	Cameroon	Baylor

The Pelicans had one first-round pick entering the draft. This would technically be the first draft in franchise history where the New Orleans Pelicans franchise would work on the NBA draft for two days instead of one day like it had been since the draft was shortened down to two rounds back in 1989. On the first day, with their only pick in the draft, the Pelicans would select the Cameroonian center Yves Missi from Baylor University.

== Roster ==
2024–25 New Orleans Pelicans roster
Players

Pos.	No.	Player	Height	Weight	DOB	From
G	15	Jose Alvarado	6 ft 0 in (1.83 m)	179 lb (81 kg)	1998-04-12	Georgia Tech
G	11	Brandon Boston Jr.	6 ft 6 in (1.98 m)	188 lb (85 kg)	2001-11-28	Kentucky
F	0	Keion Brooks Jr. (TW)	6 ft 7 in (2.01 m)	210 lb (95 kg)	2000-08-07	Washington
G/F	00	Bruce Brown	6 ft 4 in (1.93 m)	202 lb (92 kg)	1996-08-15	Miami (FL)
F	8	Jamal Cain (TW)	6 ft 6 in (1.98 m)	191 lb (87 kg)	1999-03-20	Oakland
G	24	Jordan Hawkins	6 ft 5 in (1.96 m)	190 lb (86 kg)	2002-04-29	Connecticut
F	2	Herbert Jones (injured)	6 ft 7 in (2.01 m)	206 lb (93 kg)	1998-10-06	Alabama
F/C	17	Karlo Matković	6 ft 10 in (2.08 m)	231 lb (105 kg)	2001-03-30	Croatia
G	3	CJ McCollum (injured)	6 ft 3 in (1.91 m)	190 lb (86 kg)	1991-09-19	Lehigh
C	21	Yves Missi	6 ft 11 in (2.11 m)	235 lb (107 kg)	2004-05-14	Baylor
F	25	Trey Murphy III	6 ft 8 in (2.03 m)	206 lb (93 kg)	2000-06-18	Virginia
G	5	Dejounte Murray (injured)	6 ft 4 in (1.93 m)	180 lb (82 kg)	1996-09-19	Washington
F/C	13	Kelly Olynyk	6 ft 11 in (2.11 m)	240 lb (109 kg)	1991-04-19	Gonzaga
G	4	Elfrid Payton	6 ft 3 in (1.91 m)	195 lb (88 kg)	1994-02-22	Louisiana
G	22	Lester Quiñones (TW)	6 ft 4 in (1.93 m)	208 lb (94 kg)	2000-11-16	Memphis
G/F	12	Antonio Reeves	6 ft 5 in (1.96 m)	205 lb (93 kg)	2000-11-20	Kentucky
F/C	50	Jeremiah Robinson-Earl	6 ft 8 in (2.03 m)	240 lb (109 kg)	2000-11-03	Villanova
F	1	Zion Williamson (injured)	6 ft 6 in (1.98 m)	284 lb (129 kg)	2000-07-06	Duke

Coaches
Head coach
- Willie Green
Assistant(s)
- James Borrego (associate HC)
- Corey Brewer
- Jarron Collins
- Dan Geriot
- Casey Hill
- Darnell Lazare
- Jodie Meeks
- Aaron Miles

Legend
- (DP) Unsigned draft pick
- (FA) Free agent
- (S) Suspended
- (GL) On assignment to G League
- (TW) Two-way affiliate player
- Injured

Roster
Updated: February 1, 2025

== Standings ==
=== Division ===
Southwest Division	W	L	PCT	GB	Home	Road	Div	GP
y – Houston Rockets	52	30	.634	–	29‍–‍12	23‍–‍18	13‍–‍3	82
x – Memphis Grizzlies	48	34	.585	4.0	26‍–‍15	22‍–‍19	11‍–‍5	82
pi – Dallas Mavericks	39	43	.476	13.0	22‍–‍18	17‍–‍25	8‍–‍8	82
San Antonio Spurs	34	48	.415	18.0	20‍–‍21	14‍–‍27	5‍–‍11	82
New Orleans Pelicans	21	61	.256	31.0	14‍–‍27	7‍–‍34	3‍–‍13	82

=== Conference ===
Western Conference
#	Team	W	L	PCT	GB	GP
1	z – Oklahoma City Thunder *	68	14	.829	–	82
2	y – Houston Rockets *	52	30	.634	16.0	82
3	y – Los Angeles Lakers *	50	32	.610	18.0	82
4	x – Denver Nuggets	50	32	.610	18.0	82
5	x – Los Angeles Clippers	50	32	.610	18.0	82
6	x – Minnesota Timberwolves	49	33	.598	19.0	82
7	x – Golden State Warriors	48	34	.585	20.0	82
8	x – Memphis Grizzlies	48	34	.585	20.0	82
9	pi – Sacramento Kings	40	42	.488	28.0	82
10	pi – Dallas Mavericks	39	43	.476	29.0	82
11	Phoenix Suns	36	46	.439	32.0	82
12	Portland Trail Blazers	36	46	.439	32.0	82
13	San Antonio Spurs	34	48	.415	34.0	82
14	New Orleans Pelicans	21	61	.256	47.0	82
15	Utah Jazz	17	65	.207	51.0	82

== Game log ==
=== Preseason ===
2024 preseason game log
Total: 1–2 (Home: 1–0; Road: 0–2)
Preseason: 1–2 (home: 1–0; road: 0–2)

Game	Date	Team	Score	High points	High rebounds	High assists	Location Attendance	Record
1	October 7	Orlando	W 106–104	Jordan Hawkins (18)	Zion Williamson (8)	Dejounte Murray (6)	Smoothie King Center; 17,687	1–0
–	October 11	@ Orlando	Canceled due to Hurricane Milton					
2	October 13	@ Miami	L 99–101	Zion Williamson (13)	Javonte Green (8)	Elfrid Payton (7)	Kaseya Center; 19,600	1–1
3	October 15	@ Houston	L 98–118	Jordan Hawkins (20)	Dejounte Murray (6)	Dejounte Murray (7)	Toyota Center; 15,528	1–2

2024–25 preseason schedule

=== Regular season ===
2024–25 game log
Total: 21–61 (Home: 14–27; Road: 7–34)
October: 2–3 (home: 1–0; road: 1–3)

Game	Date	Team	Score	High points	High rebounds	High assists	Location Attendance	Record
1	October 23	Chicago	W 123–111	Brandon Ingram (33)	Dejounte Murray (8)	Dejounte Murray (10)	Smoothie King Center; 18,581	1–0
2	October 25	@ Portland	W 105–103	Jordan Hawkins (24)	Zion Williamson (11)	Zion Williamson (7)	Moda Center; 16,190	2–0
3	October 27	@ Portland	L 103–125	CJ McCollum (27)	Brandon Ingram (8)	Brandon Ingram (6)	Moda Center; 16,138	2–1
4	October 29	@ Golden State	L 106–124	Zion Williamson (31)	Zion Williamson (8)	CJ McCollum (5)	Chase Center; 18,064	2–2
5	October 30	@ Golden State	L 89–104	Jordan Hawkins (23)	Zion Williamson (12)	Brandon Ingram (6)	Chase Center; 18,064	2–3

November: 2–13 (home: 2–7; road: 0–6)

Game	Date	Team	Score	High points	High rebounds	High assists	Location Attendance	Record
6	November 1	Indiana	W 125–118	Zion Williamson (34)	Yves Missi (10)	Zion Williamson (10)	Smoothie King Center; 15,133	3–3
7	November 3	Atlanta	L 111–126	Brandon Ingram (32)	Ingram, Robinson-Earl (7)	Jose Alvarado (7)	Smoothie King Center; 15,505	3–4
8	November 4	Portland	L 100–118	Brandon Ingram (27)	Yves Missi (7)	Brandon Ingram (7)	Smoothie King Center; 14,932	3–5
9	November 6	Cleveland	L 122–131	Zion Williamson (29)	Zion Williamson (8)	Alvarado, Boston Jr., Ingram (5)	Smoothie King Center; 15,694	3–6
10	November 8	@ Orlando	L 88–115	Brandon Boston Jr. (26)	Brandon Boston Jr. (6)	Alvarado, Ingram (5)	Kia Center; 18,565	3–7
11	November 11	Brooklyn	L 105–107	Brandon Ingram (24)	Yves Missi (11)	Brandon Boston Jr. (10)	Smoothie King Center; 16,895	3–8
12	November 13	@ Oklahoma City	L 88–106	Brandon Ingram (18)	Boston Jr., Missi (10)	Brandon Ingram (6)	Paycom Center; 17,180	3–9
13	November 15	Denver	W 101–94	Brandon Ingram (29)	Yves Missi (12)	Brandon Ingram (7)	Smoothie King Center; 16,137	4–9
14	November 16	L.A. Lakers	L 99–104	Brandon Ingram (32)	Jeremiah Robinson-Earl (9)	Brandon Ingram (8)	Smoothie King Center; 18,761	4–10
15	November 19	@ Dallas	L 91–132	Trey Murphy III (19)	Yves Missi (9)	Ingram, Missi, Nowell (4)	American Airlines Center; 20,077	4–11
16	November 20	@ Cleveland	L 100–128	Antonio Reeves (34)	Yves Missi (8)	Elfrid Payton (8)	Rocket Mortgage FieldHouse; 19,432	4–12
17	November 22	Golden State	L 108–112	Trey Murphy III (24)	Jeremiah Robinson-Earl (12)	Boston Jr., Ingram (7)	Smoothie King Center; 16,820	4–13
18	November 25	@ Indiana	L 110–114	Trey Murphy III (24)	Yves Missi (13)	Elfrid Payton (21)	Gainbridge Fieldhouse; 16,059	4–14
19	November 27	Toronto	L 93–119	CJ McCollum (19)	Jeremiah Robinson-Earl (10)	Green, McCollum, Payton (4)	Smoothie King Center; 17,307	4–15
20	November 29	@ Memphis	L 109–120	CJ McCollum (30)	Yves Missi (14)	Dejounte Murray (6)	FedExForum; 17,014	4–16

December: 1–12 (home: 1–7; road: 0–5)

Game	Date	Team	Score	High points	High rebounds	High assists	Location Attendance	Record
21	December 1	@ New York	L 85–118	Boston Jr., McCollum (13)	Missi, Murray (8)	Elfrid Payton (7)	Madison Square Garden; 19,812	4–17
22	December 2	@ Atlanta	L 112–124	CJ McCollum (29)	Yves Missi (12)	Dejounte Murray (10)	State Farm Arena; 15,034	4–18
23	December 5	Phoenix	W 126–124	Brandon Ingram (29)	Yves Missi (12)	CJ McCollum (6)	Smoothie King Center; 16,365	5–18
24	December 7	Oklahoma City	L 109–119	Dejounte Murray (26)	Dejounte Murray (9)	CJ McCollum (8)	Smoothie King Center; 15,718	5–19
25	December 8	@ San Antonio	L 116–121	Trey Murphy III (25)	Yves Missi (14)	Dejounte Murray (11)	Frost Bank Center; 16,840	5–20
26	December 12	Sacramento	L 109–111	CJ McCollum (36)	Yves Missi (11)	Dejounte Murray (9)	Smoothie King Center; 15,488	5–21
27	December 15	@ Indiana	L 104–119	Brandon Boston Jr. (20)	Yves Missi (14)	Dejounte Murray (7)	Gainbridge Fieldhouse; 16,792	5–22
28	December 19	@ Houston	L 113–133	Trey Murphy III (28)	Yves Missi (11)	Dejounte Murray (8)	Toyota Center; 18,055	5–23
29	December 21	New York	L 93–104	Trey Murphy III (26)	Dejounte Murray (9)	Dejounte Murray (8)	Smoothie King Center; 16,696	5–24
30	December 22	Denver	L 129–132 (OT)	Jordan Hawkins (21)	Yves Missi (9)	Dejounte Murray (15)	Smoothie King Center; 17,474	5–25
31	December 26	Houston	L 111–128	Trey Murphy III (21)	Yves Missi (9)	Herbert Jones (7)	Smoothie King Center; 16,052	5–26
32	December 27	Memphis	L 124–132	Trey Murphy III (35)	Daniel Theis (11)	Dejounte Murray (9)	Smoothie King Center; 17,328	5–27
33	December 30	L.A. Clippers	L 113–116	CJ McCollum (33)	Dejounte Murray (10)	Dejounte Murray (8)	Smoothie King Center; 17,303	5–28

January: 7–9 (home: 4–4; road: 3–5)

Game	Date	Team	Score	High points	High rebounds	High assists	Location Attendance	Record
34	January 1	@ Miami	L 108–119	Trey Murphy III (34)	Six players (4)	Dejounte Murray (7)	Kaseya Center; 20,013	5–29
35	January 3	Washington	W 132–120	CJ McCollum (50)	Yves Missi (11)	Dejounte Murray (12)	Smoothie King Center; 17,307	6–29
36	January 5	@ Washington	W 110–98	CJ McCollum (25)	Dejounte Murray (10)	Dejounte Murray (12)	Capital One Arena; 15,451	7–29
37	January 7	Minnesota	L 97–104	Dejounte Murray (29)	Yves Missi (9)	Dejounte Murray (6)	Smoothie King Center; 16,282	7–30
38	January 8	Portland	L 100–119	CJ McCollum (23)	Green, Missi (7)	Dejounte Murray (5)	Smoothie King Center; 16,425	7–31
39	January 10	@ Philadelphia	W 123–115	CJ McCollum (38)	Dejounte Murray (10)	Jose Alvarado (9)	Wells Fargo Center; 19,779	8–31
40	January 12	@ Boston	L 119–120	Trey Murphy III (30)	Dejounte Murray (9)	Dejounte Murray (8)	TD Garden; 19,156	8–32
41	January 14	@ Chicago	W 119–113	Trey Murphy III (32)	Missi, Murray, Theis, Williamson (7)	Zion Williamson (9)	United Center; 17,210	9–32
42	January 15	Dallas	W 119–116	Dejounte Murray (30)	Trey Murphy III (10)	Dejounte Murray (7)	Smoothie King Center; 16,488	10–32
43	January 17	Utah	W 136–123	CJ McCollum (26)	Zion Williamson (14)	Alvarado, Murray, Williamson (6)	Smoothie King Center; 18,321	11–32
44	January 20	Utah	W 123–119 (OT)	CJ McCollum (45)	Dejounte Murray (9)	Dejounte Murray (11)	Smoothie King Center; 14,830	12–32
–	January 22	Milwaukee	Postponed due to the Gulf Coast blizzard. Makeup date April 6.					
45	January 24	@ Memphis	L 126–139	Dejounte Murray (26)	Murphy III, Murray (6)	Dejounte Murray (7)	FedExForum; 16,495	12–33
46	January 25	@ Charlotte	L 92–123	Zion Williamson (28)	Zion Williamson (11)	Alvarado, Murphy III (5)	Spectrum Center; 18,461	12–34
47	January 27	@ Toronto	L 104–113	Zion Williamson (31)	Five players (7)	Dejounte Murray (8)	Scotiabank Arena; 18,054	12–35
48	January 29	Dallas	L 136–137	Trey Murphy III (32)	Yves Missi (7)	CJ McCollum (8)	Smoothie King Center; 15,656	12–36
49	January 31	Boston	L 116–118	Trey Murphy III (40)	Yves Missi (13)	Jose Alvarado (6)	Smoothie King Center; 16,432	12–37

February: 4–7 (home: 3–1; road: 1–6)

Game	Date	Team	Score	High points	High rebounds	High assists	Location Attendance	Record
50	February 3	@ Denver	L 113–125	Trey Murphy III (41)	Karlo Matković (11)	McCollum, Williamson (5)	Ball Arena; 19,587	12–38
51	February 5	@ Denver	L 119–144	Zion Williamson (28)	Karlo Matković (9)	Trey Murphy III (9)	Ball Arena; 19,526	12–39
52	February 8	@ Sacramento	L 118–123	Zion Williamson (40)	Yves Missi (13)	Jose Alvarado (9)	Golden 1 Center; 17,832	12–40
53	February 10	@ Oklahoma City	L 101–137	Trey Murphy III (23)	Karlo Matković (9)	Murphy III, Williamson (5)	Paycom Center; 17,340	12–41
54	February 12	Sacramento	L 111–119	Zion Williamson (33)	Missi, Williamson (9)	Jose Alvarado (9)	Smoothie King Center; 17,444	12–42
55	February 13	Sacramento	W 140–133 (OT)	CJ McCollum (43)	Trey Murphy III (9)	Trey Murphy III (11)	Smoothie King Center; 16,686	13–42
All-Star Game
56	February 21	@ Dallas	L 103–111	Zion Williamson (29)	Yves Missi (10)	Trey Murphy III (6)	American Airlines Center; 20,125	13–43
57	February 23	San Antonio	W 114–96	Zion Williamson (22)	Missi, Olynyk (15)	Jose Alvarado (8)	Smoothie King Center; 17,399	14–43
58	February 25	San Antonio	W 109–103	Trey Murphy III (24)	Kelly Olynyk (12)	Bruce Brown (6)	Smoothie King Center; 16,767	15–43
59	February 27	@ Phoenix	W 124–116	Zion Williamson (27)	Matković, Missi, Williamson (10)	Zion Williamson (11)	PHX Arena; 17,071	16–43
60	February 28	@ Phoenix	L 108–125	Hawkins, Missi (24)	Kelly Olynyk (7)	Trey Murphy III (8)	PHX Arena; 17,071	16–44

March: 5–10 (home: 3–5; road: 2–5)

Game	Date	Team	Score	High points	High rebounds	High assists	Location Attendance	Record
61	March 2	@ Utah	W 128–121	Kelly Olynyk (26)	Kelly Olynyk (9)	Zion Williamson (9)	Delta Center; 18,175	17–44
62	March 4	@ L.A. Lakers	L 115–136	Zion Williamson (37)	Trey Murphy III (6)	Zion Williamson (6)	Crypto.com Arena; 18,997	17–45
63	March 6	Houston	L 97–109	Trey Murphy III (26)	Zion Williamson (10)	Jose Alvarado (4)	Smoothie King Center; 17,636	17–46
64	March 8	@ Houston	L 117–146	Zion Williamson (20)	Karlo Matković (7)	Jose Alvarado (7)	Toyota Center; 18,055	17–47
65	March 9	Memphis	L 104–107	Trey Murphy III (27)	Karlo Matković (11)	Jose Alvarado (11)	Smoothie King Center; 17,435	17–48
66	March 11	L.A. Clippers	W 127–120	CJ McCollum (23)	Zion Williamson (10)	Zion Williamson (12)	Smoothie King Center; 17,363	18–48
67	March 13	Orlando	L 93–113	Zion Williamson (20)	Bamba, Williamson (8)	Zion Williamson (5)	Smoothie King Center; 16,323	18–49
68	March 15	@ San Antonio	L 115–119	CJ McCollum (26)	Karlo Matković (11)	CJ McCollum (9)	Frost Bank Center; 18,549	18–50
69	March 17	Detroit	L 81–127	Zion Williamson (30)	Yves Missi (10)	CJ McCollum (5)	Smoothie King Center; 17,398	18–51
70	March 19	@ Minnesota	W 119–115	Zion Williamson (29)	Brown, Missi, Robinson-Earl (7)	Zion Williamson (8)	Target Center; 16,936	19–51
71	March 21	@ Minnesota	L 93–134	CJ McCollum (15)	Yves Missi (10)	Kelly Olynyk (4)	Target Center; 18,978	19–52
72	March 23	@ Detroit	L 130–136	CJ McCollum (40)	Karlo Matković (11)	Alvarado, Olynyk, Robinson-Earl (8)	Little Caesars Arena; 20,062	19–53
73	March 24	Philadelphia	W 112–99	Karlo Matković (19)	Kelly Olynyk (11)	Elfrid Payton (14)	Smoothie King Center; 16,987	20–53
74	March 28	Golden State	L 95–111	Bruce Brown (18)	Yves Missi (10)	Elfrid Payton (10)	Smoothie King Center; 18,133	20–54
75	March 30	Charlotte	W 98–94	Keion Brooks Jr. (17)	Bruce Brown (12)	Elfrid Payton (6)	Smoothie King Center; 17,490	21–54

April: 0–7 (home: 0–3; road: 0–4)

Game	Date	Team	Score	High points	High rebounds	High assists	Location Attendance	Record
76	April 2	@ L.A. Clippers	L 98–114	Jose Alvarado (17)	Yves Missi (12)	Jose Alvarado (10)	Intuit Dome; 17,109	21–55
77	April 4	@ L.A. Lakers	L 108–124	Jose Alvarado (27)	Yves Missi (11)	Elfrid Payton (12)	Crypto.com Arena; 18,997	21–56
78	April 6	Milwaukee	L 107–111	Antonio Reeves (23)	Yves Missi (12)	Elfrid Payton (10)	Smoothie King Center; 17,561	21–57
79	April 8	@ Brooklyn	L 114–119	Matković, Reeves (17)	Jeremiah Robinson-Earl (9)	Elfrid Payton (10)	Barclays Center; 16,407	21–58
80	April 10	@ Milwaukee	L 111–136	Lester Quiñones (21)	Matković, Robinson-Earl (10)	Elfrid Payton (15)	Fiserv Forum; 17,341	21–59
81	April 11	Miami	L 104–153	Jamal Cain (25)	Elfrid Payton (10)	Elfrid Payton (13)	Smoothie King Center; 17,087	21–60
82	April 13	Oklahoma City	L 100–115	Antonio Reeves (20)	Jeremiah Robinson-Earl (16)	Lester Quiñones (6)	Smoothie King Center; 17,761	21–61

2024–25 season schedule

=== NBA Cup ===
The groups were revealed during the tournament announcement on July 12, 2024.

==== West Group C ====
Pos	Team	Pld	W	L	PF	PA	PD	Qualification
1	Golden State Warriors	4	3	1	470	462	+8	Advance to knockout stage
2	Dallas Mavericks	4	3	1	493	447	+46	Advance to knockout stage
3	Denver Nuggets	4	2	2	455	449	+6	
4	Memphis Grizzlies	4	1	3	464	475	−11	
5	New Orleans Pelicans	4	1	3	409	458	−49	

Source: NBA
Rules for classification: Tiebreakers

== Player statistics ==
Legend
GP	Games played	GS	Games started	MPG	Minutes per game
FG%	Field-goal percentage	3P%	3-point field-goal percentage	FT%	Free-throw percentage
RPG	Rebounds per game	APG	Assists per game	SPG	Steals per game
BPG	Blocks per game	PPG	Points per game

=== Regular season ===
New Orleans Pelicans statistics
Player	GP	GS	MPG	FG%	3P%	FT%	RPG	APG	SPG	BPG	PPG
Jose Alvarado	56	23	24.4	.392	.359	.811	2.4	4.6	1.3	.3	10.3
Mo Bamba^{†}	4	0	15.3	.444	.000	1.000	6.3	.5	.0	.8	2.5
Brandon Boston Jr.	42	10	23.6	.436	.350	.788	3.2	2.2	1.3	.2	10.7
Keion Brooks Jr.	14	6	23.7	.486	.326	.733	4.1	.9	.7	.7	10.1
Bruce Brown^{†}	23	12	24.7	.410	.356	.750	4.2	2.4	.7	.3	8.2
Jamal Cain	37	0	13.6	.430	.325	.680	2.3	.6	.6	.2	5.3
Javonte Green^{†}	50	18	21.8	.446	.352	.758	3.6	.9	1.1	.6	5.8
Jordan Hawkins	56	9	23.6	.372	.331	.816	2.8	1.2	.5	.4	10.8
Brandon Ingram	18	18	33.1	.465	.374	.855	5.6	5.2	.9	.6	22.2
Trey Jemison III^{†}	16	0	10.4	.469		.381	2.8	.6	.4	.4	2.4
Herbert Jones	20	20	32.4	.436	.306	.825	3.9	3.3	1.9	.5	10.3
Kylor Kelley^{†}	3	1	19.4	.444		.500	6.0	1.0	.3	.3	3.3
Karlo Matković	42	7	18.8	.574	.318	.773	5.0	1.1	.5	1.0	7.7
CJ McCollum	56	56	32.7	.444	.373	.717	3.8	4.1	.8	.4	21.1
Yves Missi	73	67	26.8	.547	.000	.623	8.2	1.4	.5	1.3	9.1
Trey Murphy III	53	51	35.0	.454	.361	.887	5.1	3.5	1.1	.7	21.2
Dejounte Murray	31	31	32.6	.393	.299	.823	6.5	7.4	2.0	.4	17.5
Jaylen Nowell	8	0	21.0	.356	.296	.636	2.5	2.3	.1	.5	8.4
Kelly Olynyk^{†}	20	20	25.4	.500	.389	.754	5.9	3.6	.9	.6	10.7
Elfrid Payton^{†}	18	7	21.6	.366	.167	.571	3.7	8.1	1.0	.4	4.4
Lester Quiñones^{†}	9	0	18.4	.386	.317	.833	1.7	2.6	.3	.2	8.6
Antonio Reeves	44	6	15.0	.456	.395	.800	1.4	.9	.5	.1	6.9
Jeremiah Robinson-Earl	66	9	18.8	.455	.341	.836	4.8	1.3	.6	.1	6.3
Daniel Theis	38	9	16.3	.473	.243	.838	4.3	1.6	.5	.5	4.3
Zion Williamson	30	30	28.6	.567	.231	.656	7.2	5.3	1.2	.9	24.6

- ^{†} Denotes player spent time with another team in the season. Stats reflect time with the Pelicans only.

== Transactions ==
=== Trades ===
June 27, 2024	To New Orleans Pelicans Draft rights to Antonio Reeves (No. 47)	To Orlando Magic 2030 NOP second-round pick swap right 2031 NOP second-round pick swap right
July 6, 2024	To New Orleans Pelicans 2027 WAS protected second-round pick	To Washington Wizards (Lithuania) Jonas Valančiūnas
July 6, 2024	To New Orleans Pelicans (United States) Dejounte Murray	To Atlanta Hawks (Australia) Dyson Daniels (United States) E. J. Liddell (United States) Larry Nance Jr. (United States) Cody Zeller; 2025 LAL first-round pick 2027 MIL top-four protected first-round pick
February 5, 2025	To New Orleans Pelicans Cash considerations	To Oklahoma City Thunder (Germany) Daniel Theis; 2031 NOP second-round pick
February 6, 2025	To New Orleans Pelicans (United States) Bruce Brown (Canada) Kelly Olynyk; 2026 IND protected first-round pick 2031 second-round pick	To Toronto Raptors (United States) Brandon Ingram
