= Yves Missi =

Cameroonian basketball player (born 2004)

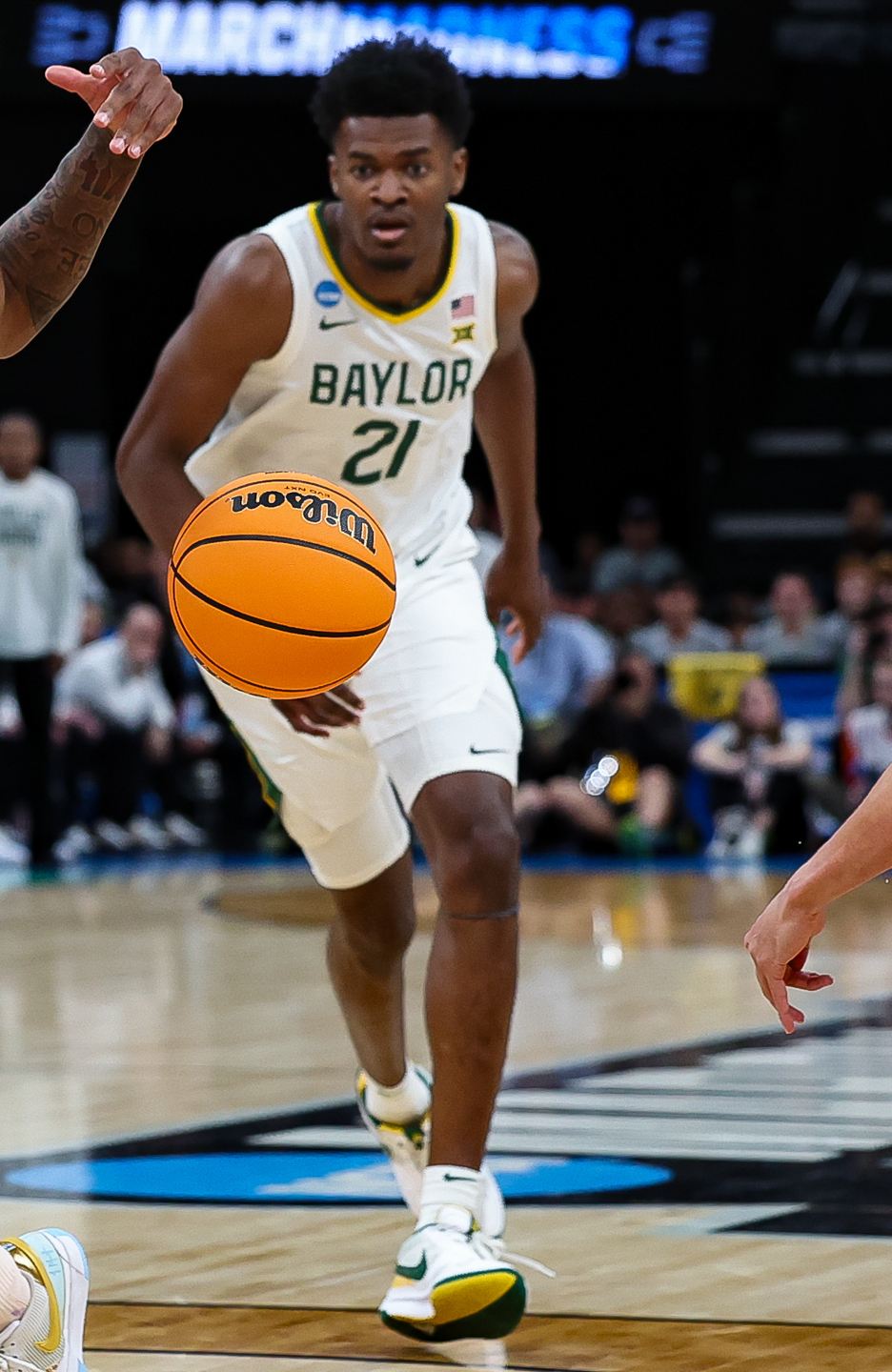
- Missi with Baylor in 2024

No. 21 – New Orleans Pelicans
- Position: Center
- League: NBA

Personal information
- Born: 14 May 2004 (age 22) Brussels, Belgium
- Listed height: 6 ft 11 in (2.11 m)
- Listed weight: 236 lb (107 kg)

Career information
- High school: West Nottingham Academy (Colora, Maryland); Prolific Prep (Napa, California)
- College: Baylor (2023–2024)
- NBA draft: 2024: 1st round, 21st overall pick
- Drafted by: New Orleans Pelicans
- Playing career: 2024–present

Career history
- 2024–present: New Orleans Pelicans

Career highlights
- NBA All-Rookie Second Team (2025); Big 12 All-Defensive team (2024); Big 12 All-Freshman team (2024)
- Stats at NBA.com
- Stats at Basketball Reference

Yves Thierry Missi (/ˈiːv ˈmiːsi/ EEV MEE-see; born 14 May 2004) is a Cameroonian professional basketball player for the New Orleans Pelicans of the National Basketball Association (NBA). He played college basketball for the Baylor Bears and was drafted by the Pelicans with the 21st pick of the 2024 NBA draft.

== Early life and high school career ==
Missi was born on 14 May 2004 in Belgium but grew up in Yaoundé, Cameroon. He moved to the United States in 2021 and began attending West Nottingham Academy in Maryland. He later transferred to Prolific Prep in Napa, California, and averaged 9.3 points, 8.7 rebounds and 1.3 blocks per game. A five-star recruit, he was highly recruited and was ranked by ESPN as the second-best player in California, the 13th-best player nationally and third-best center.

Missi played at the Nike Hoop Summit in 2023 and won The Grind Session World Championship with Prolific Prep, earning a place at the GEICO High School Nationals. He also played in the Nike Elite Youth Basketball League (EYBL) and averaged 12.7 points, 9.9 rebounds and 2.8 blocks per game with the PSA Cardinals. He committed to playing college basketball for the Baylor Bears and reclassified to be able to join them for the 2023–24 season.

== College career ==
Missi impressed early in the 2023–24 Baylor season. Following his freshman season, he declared for the 2024 NBA draft and received a green room invite. Missi earned Big 12 All-Defensive and All-Freshman honors in 2024, finishing his one-and-done campaign with averages of 10.7 points, 5.6 rebounds and 1.5 blocks in just 23.0 minutes per game while shooting 61.4% from the field and generating 4.1 free-throw attempts per game.

== Professional career ==
On 26 June 2024, Missi was selected with the 21st overall pick by the New Orleans Pelicans in the 2024 NBA draft and on July 8, he signed with the Pelicans.

On 23 October, Missi made his NBA debut, putting up 12 points, seven rebounds, three blocks, one assist and one steal in a 123–111 win over the Chicago Bulls.

On 16 March 2026, Missi became the fifth player in New Orleans franchise history to record 10 rebounds, 5 blocks, and 5 assists.

== National team career ==
On 30 June 2025, Missi announced that he would make his Cameroon national team debut at AfroBasket 2025. He debuted on August 13, 2025, and scored 12 points in a group stage win over Tunisia.

== Career statistics ==
Legend
GP	Games played	GS	Games started	MPG	Minutes per game
FG%	Field goal percentage	3P%	3-point field goal percentage	FT%	Free throw percentage
RPG	Rebounds per game	APG	Assists per game	SPG	Steals per game
BPG	Blocks per game	PPG	Points per game	**Bold**	Career high

=== NBA ===
Year	Team	GP	GS	MPG	FG%	3P%	FT%	RPG	APG	SPG	BPG	PPG
2024–25	New Orleans	**73**	**67**	**26.8**	**.547**	.000	**.623**	**8.2**	**1.4**	**.5**	1.3	**9.1**
2025–26	New Orleans	66	14	19.7	.544	.000	.559	5.8	1.3	.3	**1.5**	5.7
Career		139	81	23.4	.546	.000	.601	7.1	1.3	.4	1.4	7.5

=== College ===
Year	Team	GP	GS	MPG	FG%	3P%	FT%	RPG	APG	SPG	BPG	PPG
2023–24	Baylor	34	32	22.9	.614	—	.616	5.6	.4	.6	1.5	10.7

== Personal life ==
Missi is a Cameroonian citizen. He is eligible to also apply for citizenship in Belgium where he was born.
