= 2024–25 Toronto Raptors season =

- Head coach: Darko Rajaković
- President: Masai Ujiri
- General manager: Bobby Webster
- Owners: Maple Leaf Sports & Entertainment
- Arena: Scotiabank Arena

Results
- Record: 30–52 (.366)
- Place: Division: 3rd (Atlantic); Conference: 11th (Eastern)
- Playoff finish: Did not qualify
- Stats at Basketball Reference

Local media
- Television: TSN; Sportsnet

The 2024–25 Toronto Raptors season was the 30th season for the franchise in the National Basketball Association (NBA). In honor of the Raptors' 30th season, they unveiled their 30th anniversary logo for this season. On April 1, the Raptors were eliminated from playoff contention for the 3rd consecutive season following a loss to the Chicago Bulls, becoming the last Eastern Conference team to be eliminated from competing in at least the NBA play-in tournament.

The Toronto Raptors drew an average home attendance of 18,744, the highest of all Canadian basketball teams.

== Draft ==
Round	Pick	Player	Position(s)	Nationality	College / club
1	19	Ja'Kobe Walter	SG	United States	Baylor
2	31	Jonathan Mogbo	C	United States	San Francisco
2	45	Jamal Shead	PG	United States	Houston
2	57	Ulrich Chomche	PF	Cameroon	NBA Academy Africa; APR BBC (Rwanda)

The Raptors entered this draft with a first-round pick and a second-round pick. They originally had good odds to keep a lottery draft pick as well, but they would ultimately lose that pick to the San Antonio Spurs with that pick falling to #8, which was outside of their protection range. With the Raptors having a late first round pick of their own via trading with the Indiana Pacers and an early second round pick that they acquired through trades with a pick that originally belonged to the Detroit Pistons, they looked to utilize the new draft structure of working on both rounds on two separate days for the first time in franchise and League history instead of just one day like they had done since the NBA draft was implemented in two rounds properly back in 1989. Hours before the second round ensued, the Raptors commenced a trade with the Sacramento Kings which included the #45 pick in the draft. Later during the draft they also traded in cash rather than assets with the Minnesota Timberwolves to acquire the #57 pick in the draft.

== Roster ==
2024–25 Toronto Raptors roster
Players

Pos.	No.	Player	Height	Weight	DOB	From
G/F	30	Ochai Agbaji	6 ft 6 in (1.98 m)	215 lb (98 kg)	2000-04-20	Kansas
F	4	Scottie Barnes	6 ft 9 in (2.06 m)	240 lb (109 kg)	2001-08-01	Florida State
G/F	9	RJ Barrett (injured)	6 ft 7 in (2.01 m)	214 lb (97 kg)	2000-06-14	Duke
F	77	Jamison Battle	6 ft 7 in (2.01 m)	220 lb (100 kg)	2001-05-10	Ohio State
F/C	25	Chris Boucher	6 ft 9 in (2.06 m)	215 lb (98 kg)	1993-01-11	Oregon
C	11	Colin Castleton	6 ft 10 in (2.08 m)	250 lb (113 kg)	2000-05-25	Florida
C	22	Ulrich Chomche (injured) (TW)	6 ft 11 in (2.11 m)	235 lb (107 kg)	2005-12-30	NBA Academy Africa (SEN)
G/F	1	Gradey Dick (injured)	6 ft 6 in (1.98 m)	210 lb (95 kg)	2003-11-20	Kansas
F	3	Brandon Ingram (injured)	6 ft 8 in (2.03 m)	210 lb (95 kg)	1997-09-02	Duke
G	0	A. J. Lawson	6 ft 6 in (1.98 m)	185 lb (84 kg)	2000-07-15	South Carolina
F	2	Jonathan Mogbo	6 ft 9 in (2.06 m)	225 lb (102 kg)	2001-10-29	San Francisco
C	19	Jakob Pöltl	7 ft 0 in (2.13 m)	260 lb (118 kg)	1995-10-15	Utah
G	5	Immanuel Quickley	6 ft 2 in (1.88 m)	190 lb (86 kg)	1999-06-17	Kentucky
G/F	8	Jared Rhoden (TW)	6 ft 5 in (1.96 m)	210 lb (95 kg)	1999-08-27	Seton Hall
G	23	Jamal Shead	6 ft 1 in (1.85 m)	200 lb (91 kg)	2002-07-24	Houston
G/F	17	Garrett Temple	6 ft 6 in (1.98 m)	195 lb (88 kg)	1986-05-08	LSU
G	14	Ja'Kobe Walter	6 ft 5 in (1.96 m)	180 lb (82 kg)	2004-09-04	Baylor

Coaches
Head coach
- Darko Rajaković
Assistant(s)
- Mery Andrade
- Michael Batiste
- Vin Bhavnani
- Pat Delany
- Eric Khoury
- Jama Mahlalela
- Jim Sann
- Ivo Simović
- James Wade

Legend
- (DP) Unsigned draft pick
- (FA) Free agent
- (S) Suspended
- (GL) On assignment to G League affiliate
- (TW) Two-way affiliate player
- Injured

Roster
Updated: April 13, 2025

== Standings ==
=== Division ===
Atlantic Division	W	L	PCT	GB	Home	Road	Div	GP
y – Boston Celtics	61	21	.744	–	28‍–‍13	33‍–‍8	14‍–‍2	82
x – New York Knicks	51	31	.622	10.0	27‍–‍14	24‍–‍17	12‍–‍4	82
Toronto Raptors	30	52	.366	31.0	18‍–‍23	12‍–‍29	8‍–‍8	82
Brooklyn Nets	26	56	.317	35.0	12‍–‍29	14‍–‍27	3‍–‍13	82
Philadelphia 76ers	24	58	.293	37.0	12‍–‍29	12‍–‍29	3‍–‍13	82

=== Conference ===
Eastern Conference
#	Team	W	L	PCT	GB	GP
1	c – Cleveland Cavaliers *	64	18	.780	–	82
2	y – Boston Celtics *	61	21	.744	3.0	82
3	x – New York Knicks	51	31	.622	13.0	82
4	x – Indiana Pacers	50	32	.610	14.0	82
5	x – Milwaukee Bucks	48	34	.585	16.0	82
6	x – Detroit Pistons	44	38	.537	20.0	82
7	y – Orlando Magic *	41	41	.500	23.0	82
8	pi – Atlanta Hawks	40	42	.488	24.0	82
9	pi – Chicago Bulls	39	43	.476	25.0	82
10	x – Miami Heat	37	45	.451	27.0	82
11	Toronto Raptors	30	52	.366	34.0	82
12	Brooklyn Nets	26	56	.317	38.0	82
13	Philadelphia 76ers	24	58	.293	40.0	82
14	Charlotte Hornets	19	63	.232	45.0	82
15	Washington Wizards	18	64	.220	46.0	82

== Game log ==
=== Preseason ===
2024 preseason game log
Total: 3–2 (Home: 2–0; Road: 1–2)
Preseason: 3–2 (home: 2–0; road: 1–2)

Game	Date	Team	Score	High points	High rebounds	High assists	Location Attendance	Record
1	October 6	Washington	W 125–98	RJ Barrett (17)	Fernando, Pöltl (7)	Dick, Mitchell, Mogbo (5)	Bell Centre; 21,900	1–0
2	October 11	@ Washington	L 95–113	Chris Boucher (22)	Scottie Barnes (8)	Davion Mitchell (6)	Capital One Arena; 7,815	1–1
3	October 13	@ Boston	L 111–115	Gradey Dick (18)	Jakob Pöltl (13)	Agbaji, Shead (5)	TD Garden; 19,156	1–2
4	October 15	Boston	W 119–118	Gradey Dick (27)	Jakob Pöltl (16)	Barnes, Mitchell (10)	Scotiabank Arena; 17,507	2–2
5	October 18	@ Brooklyn	W 116–112	Scottie Barnes (21)	Jakob Pöltl (8)	Immanuel Quickley (10)	Barclays Center; 17,158	3–2

2024–25 preseason schedule

=== Regular season ===
2024–25 game log
Total: 30–52 (Home: 18–23; Road: 12–29)
October: 1–4 (home: 1–2; road: 0–2)

Game	Date	Team	Score	High points	High rebounds	High assists	Location Attendance	Record
1	October 23	Cleveland	L 106–136	Chris Boucher (18)	Jakob Pöltl (9)	Scottie Barnes (5)	Scotiabank Arena; 19,800	0–1
2	October 25	Philadelphia	W 115–107	Scottie Barnes (27)	Mogbo, Pöltl (9)	Mogbo, Shead (5)	Scotiabank Arena; 18,345	1–1
3	October 26	@ Minnesota	L 101–112	Gradey Dick (25)	Jakob Pöltl (10)	Davion Mitchell (8)	Target Center; 18,978	1–2
4	October 28	Denver	L 125–127 (OT)	Scottie Barnes (21)	Jakob Pöltl (19)	Scottie Barnes (9)	Scotiabank Arena; 19,082	1–3
5	October 30	@ Charlotte	L 133–138	RJ Barrett (31)	Jakob Pöltl (16)	Davion Mitchell (11)	Spectrum Center; 13,113	1–4

November: 4–11 (home: 3–2; road: 1–9)

Game	Date	Team	Score	High points	High rebounds	High assists	Location Attendance	Record
6	November 1	L.A. Lakers	L 125–131	RJ Barrett (33)	Jakob Pöltl (12)	RJ Barrett (12)	Scotiabank Arena; 19,800	1–5
7	November 2	Sacramento	W 131–128 (OT)	RJ Barrett (31)	Barrett, Pöltl (9)	Davion Mitchell (7)	Scotiabank Arena; 19,815	2–5
8	November 4	@ Denver	L 119–121	Gradey Dick (26)	Jakob Pöltl (11)	RJ Barrett (10)	Ball Arena; 19,525	2–6
9	November 6	@ Sacramento	L 107–122	RJ Barrett (23)	Jakob Pöltl (8)	Davion Mitchell (6)	Golden 1 Center; 16,026	2–7
10	November 9	@ L.A. Clippers	L 103–105	Agbaji, Quickley (21)	Jakob Pöltl (12)	Mitchell, Quickley (4)	Intuit Dome; 17,927	2–8
11	November 10	@ L.A. Lakers	L 103–123	Barrett, Boucher (18)	Jakob Pöltl (10)	Davion Mitchell (5)	Crypto.com Arena; 18,997	2–9
12	November 12	@ Milwaukee	L 85–99	Gradey Dick (32)	Bruno Fernando (13)	Davion Mitchell (8)	Fiserv Forum; 17,341	2–10
13	November 15	Detroit	L 95–99	Jakob Pöltl (25)	Jakob Pöltl (18)	RJ Barrett (7)	Scotiabank Arena; 19,245	2–11
14	November 16	@ Boston	L 123–126 (OT)	Jakob Pöltl (35)	Jakob Pöltl (12)	RJ Barrett (15)	TD Garden; 19,156	2–12
15	November 18	Indiana	W 130–119	RJ Barrett (39)	Jakob Pöltl (15)	Ochai Agbaji (6)	Scotiabank Arena; 19,025	3–12
16	November 21	Minnesota	W 110–105	RJ Barrett (31)	Jakob Pöltl (12)	Davion Mitchell (8)	Scotiabank Arena; 19,296	4–12
17	November 24	@ Cleveland	L 108–122	Barnes, Dick (18)	Jakob Pöltl (19)	Scottie Barnes (7)	Rocket Mortgage FieldHouse; 19,432	4–13
18	November 25	@ Detroit	L 100–102	Scottie Barnes (31)	Scottie Barnes (14)	Scottie Barnes (7)	Little Caesars Arena; 18,421	4–14
19	November 27	@ New Orleans	W 119–93	Agbaji, Battle (24)	Scottie Barnes (12)	RJ Barrett (11)	Smoothie King Center; 17,307	5–14
20	November 29	@ Miami	L 111–121	RJ Barrett (25)	Barnes, Pöltl (10)	Scottie Barnes (10)	Kaseya Center; 19,607	5–15

December: 2–11 (home: 2–7; road: 0–4)

Game	Date	Team	Score	High points	High rebounds	High assists	Location Attendance	Record
21	December 1	Miami	W 119–116	RJ Barrett (37)	Jakob Pöltl (11)	Scottie Barnes (9)	Scotiabank Arena; 18,153	6–15
22	December 3	Indiana	W 122–111	Scottie Barnes (35)	Jakob Pöltl (10)	Scottie Barnes (9)	Scotiabank Arena; 17,741	7–15
23	December 5	Oklahoma City	L 92–129	Barrett, Mogbo (17)	Scottie Barnes (12)	Scottie Barnes (8)	Scotiabank Arena; 18,356	7–16
24	December 7	Dallas	L 118–125	Gradey Dick (27)	Scottie Barnes (8)	Scottie Barnes (14)	Scotiabank Arena; 19,625	7–17
25	December 9	New York	L 108–113	RJ Barrett (30)	Jakob Pöltl (12)	Agbaji, Barrett, Pöltl (4)	Scotiabank Arena; 18,284	7–18
26	December 12	@ Miami	L 104–114	Gradey Dick (22)	RJ Barrett (11)	RJ Barrett (10)	Kaseya Center; 19,600	7–19
27	December 16	Chicago	L 121–122	RJ Barrett (32)	Chris Boucher (10)	RJ Barrett (9)	Scotiabank Arena; 16,324	7–20
28	December 19	Brooklyn	L 94–101	Ochai Agbaji (20)	Dick, Mogbo, Olynyk (6)	Scottie Barnes (6)	Scotiabank Arena; 19,214	7–21
29	December 22	Houston	L 110–114	Ja'Kobe Walter (27)	Scottie Barnes (10)	Jamal Shead (10)	Scotiabank Arena; 19,305	7–22
30	December 23	@ New York	L 125–139	Scottie Barnes (24)	RJ Barrett (6)	Scottie Barnes (8)	Madison Square Garden; 19,812	7–23
31	December 26	@ Memphis	L 126–155	RJ Barrett (27)	RJ Barrett (9)	RJ Barrett (10)	FedExForum; 17,196	7–24
32	December 29	Atlanta	L 107–136	Scottie Barnes (19)	Scottie Barnes (8)	Jamal Shead (6)	Scotiabank Arena; 19,359	7–25
33	December 31	@ Boston	L 71–125	Scottie Barnes (16)	Barnes, Pöltl (13)	Mitchell, Pöltl, Shead (3)	TD Garden; 19,156	7–26

January: 8–7 (home: 5–3; road: 3–4)

Game	Date	Team	Score	High points	High rebounds	High assists	Location Attendance	Record
34	January 1	Brooklyn	W 130–113	Scottie Barnes (33)	Scottie Barnes (13)	Immanuel Quickley (15)	Scotiabank Arena; 19,104	8–26
35	January 3	Orlando	L 97–106	Jakob Pöltl (25)	Scottie Barnes (9)	Immanuel Quickley (11)	Scotiabank Arena; 19,278	8–27
36	January 6	Milwaukee	L 104–128	RJ Barrett (25)	RJ Barrett (9)	Jamal Shead (6)	Scotiabank Arena; 17,829	8–28
37	January 8	@ New York	L 98–112	Immanuel Quickley (22)	Jakob Pöltl (10)	Barnes, Quickley (5)	Madison Square Garden; 19,812	8–29
38	January 9	@ Cleveland	L 126–132	Scottie Barnes (24)	Chris Boucher (12)	Scottie Barnes (8)	Rocket Mortgage FieldHouse; 19,432	8–30
39	January 11	@ Detroit	L 114–123	Immanuel Quickley (25)	Barnes, Pöltl (12)	Olynyk, Shead (5)	Little Caesars Arena; 19,011	8–31
40	January 13	Golden State	W 104–101	Scottie Barnes (23)	Jacob Pöltl (13)	Barnes, Mitchell (6)	Scotiabank Arena; 19,165	9–31
41	January 15	Boston	W 110–97	RJ Barrett (22)	Jakob Pöltl (11)	Scottie Barnes (9)	Scotiabank Arena; 18,566	10–31
42	January 17	@ Milwaukee	L 112–130	RJ Barrett (21)	Jakob Pöltl (10)	Barnes, Barrett (10)	Fiserv Forum; 17,341	10–32
43	January 21	Orlando	W 109–93	RJ Barrett (19)	Scottie Barnes (11)	Scottie Barnes (8)	Scotiabank Arena; 18,284	11–32
44	January 23	@ Atlanta	W 122–119	Scottie Barnes (25)	Jakob Pöltl (9)	Davion Mitchell (7)	State Farm Arena; 14,662	12–32
45	January 25	@ Atlanta	W 117–94	Scottie Barnes (24)	Scottie Barnes (12)	Scottie Barnes (7)	State Farm Arena; 17,868	13–32
46	January 27	New Orleans	W 113–104	Barnes, Pöltl (21)	Jakob Pöltl (14)	Scottie Barnes (8)	Scotiabank Arena; 18,054	14–32
47	January 29	@ Washington	W 106–82	Scottie Barnes (24)	Jakob Pöltl (8)	Davion Mitchell (9)	Capital One Arena; 13,713	15–32
48	January 31	Chicago	L 106–122	Scottie Barnes (20)	Scottie Barnes (10)	Jakob Pöltl (6)	Scotiabank Arena; 19,365	15–33

February: 3–9 (home: 2–5; road: 1–4)

Game	Date	Team	Score	High points	High rebounds	High assists	Location Attendance	Record
49	February 2	L.A. Clippers	W 115–108	RJ Barrett (20)	Jakob Pöltl (10)	RJ Barrett (7)	Scotiabank Arena; 18,874	16–33
50	February 4	New York	L 115–121	Scottie Barnes (23)	Kelly Olynyk (9)	Jamal Shead (9)	Scotiabank Arena; 17,398	16–34
51	February 5	Memphis	L 107–138	Agbaji, Shead, Walter (14)	Dick, Olynyk (9)	Scottie Barnes (9)	Scotiabank Arena; 18,337	16–35
52	February 7	@ Oklahoma City	L 109–121	Scottie Barnes (21)	Ochai Agbaji (8)	Immanuel Quickley (10)	Paycom Center; 18,203	16–36
53	February 9	@ Houston	L 87–94	Immanuel Quickley (20)	Barnes, Robinson (9)	Scottie Barnes (7)	Toyota Center; 16,829	16–37
54	February 11	@ Philadelphia	W 106–103	Scottie Barnes (33)	Scottie Barnes (10)	Mogbo, Quickley, Shead (5)	Wells Fargo Center; 19,767	17–37
55	February 12	Cleveland	L 108–131	RJ Barrett (27)	Scottie Barnes (11)	Scottie Barnes (7)	Scotiabank Arena; 16,549	17–38
All-Star Game
56	February 21	Miami	L 111–120 (OT)	RJ Barrett (29)	Gradey Dick (10)	Jamal Shead (5)	Scotiabank Arena; 19,584	17–39
57	February 23	Phoenix	W 127–109	Barrett, Boucher, Quickley (23)	Chris Boucher (10)	Immanuel Quickley (8)	Scotiabank Arena; 18,989	18–39
58	February 25	Boston	L 101–111	RJ Barrett (22)	RJ Barrett (8)	Immanuel Quickley (7)	Scotiabank Arena; 18,134	18–40
59	February 26	@ Indiana	L 91–111	Immanuel Quickley (18)	Ja'Kobe Walter (8)	Immanuel Quickley (6)	Gainbridge Fieldhouse; 16,596	18–41
60	February 28	@ Chicago	L 115–125 (OT)	Scottie Barnes (24)	Gradey Dick (9)	RJ Barrett (8)	United Center; 20,938	18–42

March: 10–5 (home: 4–2; road: 6–3)

Game	Date	Team	Score	High points	High rebounds	High assists	Location Attendance	Record
61	March 2	@ Orlando	W 104–102	Immanuel Quickley (24)	Jakob Pöltl (11)	RJ Barrett (5)	Kia Center; 19,015	19–42
62	March 4	@ Orlando	W 114–113	RJ Barrett (21)	Scottie Barnes (13)	RJ Barrett (9)	Kia Center; 17,406	20–42
63	March 7	Utah	W 118–109	Immanuel Quickley (34)	Scottie Barnes (12)	Scottie Barnes (6)	Scotiabank Arena; 18,258	21–42
64	March 8	Washington	L 117–118	RJ Barrett (23)	RJ Barrett (9)	Jamal Shead (9)	Scotiabank Arena; 19,042	21–43
65	March 10	Washington	W 119–104	A. J. Lawson (32)	Scottie Barnes (13)	RJ Barrett (8)	Scotiabank Arena; 18,739	22–43
66	March 12	Philadelphia	W 118–105	A. J. Lawson (28)	Colin Castleton (14)	Garrett Temple (8)	Scotiabank Arena; 18,864	23–43
67	March 14	@ Utah	W 126–118	Barnes, Quickley (20)	Barnes, Robinson (10)	Barrett, Quickley, Robinson, Shead (5)	Delta Center; 18,175	24–43
68	March 16	@ Portland	L 102–105	Agbaji, Pöltl (19)	Colin Castleton (12)	Barnes, Lawson, Shead (6)	Moda Center; 18,154	24–44
69	March 17	@ Phoenix	L 89–129	Scottie Barnes (16)	Orlando Robinson (8)	Immanuel Quickley (7)	PHX Arena; 17,071	24–45
70	March 20	@ Golden State	L 114–117	Scottie Barnes (29)	Scottie Barnes (10)	Immanuel Quickley (8)	Chase Center; 18,064	24–46
71	March 23	San Antonio	L 89–123	Scottie Barnes (22)	Jonathan Mogbo (10)	Barnes, Shead (6)	Scotiabank Arena; 18,276	24–47
72	March 24	@ Washington	W 112–104	Pöltl, Quickley (21)	Mogbo, Pöltl (11)	Scottie Barnes (8)	Capital One Arena; 13,532	25–47
73	March 26	@ Brooklyn	W 116–86	Orlando Robinson (23)	Orlando Robinson (12)	Jamal Shead (8)	Barclays Center; 16,413	26–47
74	March 28	Charlotte	W 108–97	Jakob Pöltl (24)	Jakob Pöltl (12)	Immanuel Quickley (9)	Scotiabank Arena; 19,276	27–47
75	March 30	@ Philadelphia	W 127–109	RJ Barrett (31)	Ja'Kobe Walter (8)	Jamal Shead (9)	Wells Fargo Center; 19,785	28–47

April: 2–5 (home: 1–2; road: 1–3)

Game	Date	Team	Score	High points	High rebounds	High assists	Location Attendance	Record
76	April 1	@ Chicago	L 118–137	Quickley, Walter (17)	Lawson, Mogbo (6)	Immanuel Quickley (9)	United Center; 20,005	28–48
77	April 3	Portland	L 103–112	RJ Barrett (18)	Ja'Kobe Walter (7)	Barnes, Mogbo (5)	Scotiabank Arena; 18,548	28–49
78	April 4	Detroit	L 105–117	Ja'Kobe Walter (22)	Jakob Pöltl (11)	Jamal Shead (9)	Scotiabank Arena; 19,491	28–50
79	April 6	@ Brooklyn	W 120–109	Jonathan Mogbo (17)	Jonathan Mogbo (11)	Jamal Shead (12)	Barclays Center; 17,007	29–50
80	April 9	Charlotte	W 126–96	Jared Rhoden (23)	Orlando Robinson (12)	Jonathan Mogbo (11)	Scotiabank Arena; 19,800	30–50
81	April 11	@ Dallas	L 102–124	Scottie Barnes (26)	A.J. Lawson (10)	Jonathan Mogbo (8)	American Airlines Center; 20,177	30–51
82	April 13	@ San Antonio	L 118–125	Scottie Barnes (35)	Jonathan Mogbo (14)	Jonathan Mogbo (10)	Frost Bank Center; 18,672	30–52

2024–25 season schedule

=== NBA Cup ===
The groups were revealed during the tournament announcement on July 12, 2024.

==== East Group B ====
Pos	Team	Pld	W	L	PF	PA	PD	Qualification
1	Milwaukee Bucks	4	4	0	462	412	+50	Advance to knockout stage
2	Detroit Pistons	4	3	1	447	440	+7	
3	Miami Heat	4	2	2	459	439	+20	
4	Toronto Raptors	4	1	3	413	430	−17	
5	Indiana Pacers	4	0	4	445	505	−60	

Source: NBA
Rules for classification: Tiebreakers

== Player statistics ==
=== Regular season ===
Player	POS	GP	GS	MP	REB	AST	STL	BLK	PTS	MPG	RPG	APG	SPG	BPG	PPG
Jamal Shead	PG	75	11	1,467	115	316	58	10	533	19.6	1.5	4.2	.8	.1	7.1
Scottie Barnes	PF	65	65	2,134	502	378	93	63	1,252	32.8	7.7	5.8	1.4	1.0	19.3
Ochai Agbaji	SG	64	45	1,739	242	98	58	30	667	27.2	3.8	1.5	.9	.5	10.4
Jonathan Mogbo	PF	63	18	1,286	311	146	55	34	389	20.4	4.9	2.3	.9	.5	6.2
Jamison Battle	SF	59	10	1,042	158	53	17	10	419	17.7	2.7	.9	.3	.2	7.1
RJ Barrett	SF	58	58	1,869	366	314	46	17	1,223	32.2	6.3	5.4	.8	.3	21.1
Jakob Pöltl	C	57	56	1,686	547	158	66	71	824	29.6	9.6	2.8	1.2	1.2	14.5
Gradey Dick	SG	54	54	1,587	193	98	48	10	777	29.4	3.6	1.8	.9	.2	14.4
Ja'Kobe Walter	SG	52	18	1,103	160	81	43	10	449	21.2	3.1	1.6	.8	.2	8.6
Chris Boucher	PF	50	0	862	224	33	24	25	502	17.2	4.5	.7	.5	.5	10.0
Davion Mitchell^{†}	PG	44	22	1,080	85	203	31	8	279	24.5	1.9	4.6	.7	.2	6.3
Orlando Robinson^{†}	C	35	8	713	206	68	14	15	284	20.4	5.9	1.9	.4	.4	8.1
Immanuel Quickley	PG	33	33	918	117	191	23	4	564	27.8	3.5	5.8	.7	.1	17.1
Garrett Temple	SG	28	0	227	29	31	17	2	53	8.1	1.0	1.1	.6	.1	1.9
A. J. Lawson	SG	26	2	486	86	31	13	6	236	18.7	3.3	1.2	.5	.2	9.1
Kelly Olynyk^{†}	C	24	2	383	89	56	16	8	171	16.0	3.7	2.3	.7	.3	7.1
Bruce Brown^{†}	PG	18	0	353	68	28	17	3	151	19.6	3.8	1.6	.9	.2	8.4
Bruno Fernando	C	17	2	147	51	18	4	9	58	8.6	3.0	1.1	.2	.5	3.4
Colin Castleton^{†}	C	11	4	288	76	18	6	8	79	26.2	6.9	1.6	.5	.7	7.2
Jared Rhoden^{†}	SG	10	2	215	38	14	9	2	114	21.5	3.8	1.4	.9	.2	11.4
Cole Swider^{†}	SF	8	0	156	25	2	4	2	59	19.5	3.1	.3	.5	.3	7.4
Ulrich Chomche	PF	7	0	32	8	2	0	1	5	4.6	1.1	.3	.0	.1	.7
D. J. Carton	SG	4	0	33	4	3	2	0	3	8.3	1.0	.8	.5	.0	.8

- ^{†} Denotes player spent time with another team in the season. Stats reflect time with the Raptors only.

== Transactions ==
=== Trades ===
June 28, 2024	To Toronto Raptors Davion Mitchell; Aleksandar Vezenkov; Draft rights to Jamal Shead (No. 45); 2025 POR second-round pick	To Sacramento Kings Jalen McDaniels
February 6, 2025	To Toronto Raptors James Wiseman; Cash considerations	To Indiana Pacers protected second-round pick
February 6, 2025	To Toronto Raptors Brandon Ingram	To New Orleans Pelicans Bruce Brown; Kelly Olynyk; 2026 IND protected first-round pick 2031 second-round pick

=== Free agency ===
==== Re-signed ====
Date	Player	Ref.
July 6	Garrett Temple	

==== Subtractions ====
Date	Player	Reason left	New team	Ref.
April 17	Jontay Porter	Banned	Seattle Super Hawks	
June 25	Mouhamadou Gueye	Waived	Capital City Go-Go	
July 20	Gary Trent Jr.	Free agency	Milwaukee Bucks	
July 22	Javon Freeman-Liberty	Waived	(Turkey) Manisa Basket	
July 22	Aleksandar Vezenkov	Waived	(Greece) Olympiacos Piraeus B.C.	
