= 2024–25 Sacramento Kings season =

- Head coach: Mike Brown (fired); Doug Christie (interim)
- President: John Rinehart
- General manager: Monte McNair
- Owner: Vivek Ranadivé
- Arena: Golden 1 Center

Results
- Record: 40–42 (.488)
- Place: Division: 4th (Pacific); Conference: 9th (Western)
- Playoff finish: Did not qualify
- Stats at Basketball Reference

Local media
- Television: NBC Sports California; CBS 13
- Radio: KHTK Sports 1140

The 2024–25 Sacramento Kings season was the 80th season for the franchise in the National Basketball Association (NBA), and 40th season in the city of Sacramento.

The season saw the departures of coach Mike Brown and franchise guard De'Aaron Fox, who were fired and traded respectively. Doug Christie was named the interim head coach. The team failed to improve on their 46–36 record from the previous season, finishing 40-42 and as the 9th seed in the Western Conference for the second straight season.

On April 16, the Kings were eliminated from playoff contention for the second consecutive season after they lost to the Dallas Mavericks in the first stage of the play-in tournament.

== Draft picks ==
Round	Pick	Player	Position	Nationality	College / club
1	13	Devin Carter	PG	United States	Providence
2	45	Jamal Shead	PG	United States	Houston

The Kings had one first-round pick and one second-round pick entering the draft (which was two days long instead of one day like it previously has been since the NBA draft was shortened down to two rounds in 1989).

== Roster ==
2024–25 Sacramento Kings roster
Players

Pos.	No.	Player	Height	Weight	DOB	From
G	22	Devin Carter	6 ft 2 in (1.88 m)	195 lb (88 kg)	2002-03-18	Providence
F	24	Isaiah Crawford (TW)	6 ft 6 in (1.98 m)	220 lb (100 kg)	2001-11-01	Louisiana Tech
F	99	Jae Crowder	6 ft 6 in (1.98 m)	235 lb (107 kg)	1990-07-06	Marquette
G	9	Terence Davis	6 ft 3 in (1.91 m)	201 lb (91 kg)	1997-05-16	Mississippi
G/F	10	DeMar DeRozan	6 ft 6 in (1.98 m)	220 lb (100 kg)	1989-08-07	USC
G	23	Keon Ellis	6 ft 4 in (1.93 m)	175 lb (79 kg)	2000-01-08	Alabama
G	20	Markelle Fultz	6 ft 4 in (1.93 m)	209 lb (95 kg)	1998-05-29	Washington
F	3	Isaac Jones	6 ft 9 in (2.06 m)	245 lb (111 kg)	2000-07-11	Washington State
G	15	Mason Jones (TW)	6 ft 4 in (1.93 m)	200 lb (91 kg)	1998-07-21	Arkansas
F	33	Jake LaRavia	6 ft 7 in (2.01 m)	235 lb (107 kg)	2001-11-03	Wake Forest
G	8	Zach LaVine	6 ft 5 in (1.96 m)	200 lb (91 kg)	1995-03-10	UCLA
F	41	Trey Lyles	6 ft 9 in (2.06 m)	234 lb (106 kg)	1995-11-05	Kentucky
F	7	Doug McDermott	6 ft 6 in (1.98 m)	225 lb (102 kg)	1992-01-03	Creighton
G	0	Malik Monk	6 ft 3 in (1.91 m)	200 lb (91 kg)	1998-02-04	Kentucky
F	13	Keegan Murray	6 ft 8 in (2.03 m)	225 lb (102 kg)	2000-08-19	Iowa
F/C	11	Domantas Sabonis	6 ft 10 in (2.08 m)	240 lb (109 kg)	1996-05-03	Gonzaga
C	17	Jonas Valančiūnas	6 ft 11 in (2.11 m)	265 lb (120 kg)	1992-05-06	Lithuania

Coaches
Head coach
- Doug Christie (interim)
Assistant(s)
- Leandro Barbosa
- Riccardo Fois
- Luke Loucks
- Jim Moran
- Jay Triano (Associate HC)

Legend
- (DP) Unsigned draft pick
- (FA) Free agent
- (S) Suspended
- (GL) On assignment to G League affiliate
- (TW) Two-way affiliate player
- Injured

Roster
Updated: February 3, 2025

== Standings ==
=== Division ===
Pacific Division	W	L	PCT	GB	Home	Road	Div	GP
y – Los Angeles Lakers	50	32	.610	–	31‍–‍10	19‍–‍22	12‍–‍4	82
x – Los Angeles Clippers	50	32	.610	–	30‍–‍11	20‍–‍21	9‍–‍7	82
x – Golden State Warriors	48	34	.585	2.0	24‍–‍17	24‍–‍17	5‍–‍11	82
pi – Sacramento Kings	40	42	.488	10.0	20‍–‍21	20‍–‍21	5‍–‍11	82
Phoenix Suns	36	46	.439	14.0	24‍–‍17	12‍–‍29	9‍–‍7	82

=== Conference ===
Western Conference
#	Team	W	L	PCT	GB	GP
1	z – Oklahoma City Thunder *	68	14	.829	–	82
2	y – Houston Rockets *	52	30	.634	16.0	82
3	y – Los Angeles Lakers *	50	32	.610	18.0	82
4	x – Denver Nuggets	50	32	.610	18.0	82
5	x – Los Angeles Clippers	50	32	.610	18.0	82
6	x – Minnesota Timberwolves	49	33	.598	19.0	82
7	x – Golden State Warriors	48	34	.585	20.0	82
8	x – Memphis Grizzlies	48	34	.585	20.0	82
9	pi – Sacramento Kings	40	42	.488	28.0	82
10	pi – Dallas Mavericks	39	43	.476	29.0	82
11	Phoenix Suns	36	46	.439	32.0	82
12	Portland Trail Blazers	36	46	.439	32.0	82
13	San Antonio Spurs	34	48	.415	34.0	82
14	New Orleans Pelicans	21	61	.256	47.0	82
15	Utah Jazz	17	65	.207	51.0	82

== Game log ==
=== Preseason ===
2024 preseason game log
Total: 0–5 (Home: 0–2; Road: 0–3)
Preseason: 0–5 (home: 0–2; road: 0–3)

Game	Date	Team	Score	High points	High rebounds	High assists	Location Attendance	Record
1	October 9	Golden State	L 112–122	DeMar DeRozan (15)	Alex Len (9)	Alex Len (5)	Golden 1 Center; 17,889	0–1
2	October 11	@ Golden State	L 106–109	De'Aaron Fox (19)	Domantas Sabonis (13)	DeMar DeRozan (6)	Chase Center; 18,064	0–2
3	October 13	Portland	L 85–105	Alex Len (13)	Domantas Sabonis (8)	Domantas Sabonis (7)	Golden 1 Center; 14,788	0–3
4	October 15	@ Utah	L 114–117	Domantas Sabonis (29)	Domantas Sabonis (17)	Domantas Sabonis (8)	Delta Center; 14,976	0–4
5	October 17	@ L.A. Clippers	L 91–113	Domantas Sabonis (24)	Len, Sabonis (9)	McLaughlin, Sabonis (5)	Intuit Dome; 13,800	0–5

2024–25 preseason schedule

=== Regular season ===
2024–25 game log
Total: 40–42 (Home: 20–21; Road: 20–21)
October: 2–2 (home: 1–1; road: 1–1)

Game	Date	Team	Score	High points	High rebounds	High assists	Location Attendance	Record
1	October 24	Minnesota	L 115–117	DeMar DeRozan (26)	Keegan Murray (11)	De'Aaron Fox (11)	Golden 1 Center; 18,049	0–1
2	October 26	@ L.A. Lakers	L 127–131	Domantas Sabonis (29)	Domantas Sabonis (12)	Fox, Sabonis (10)	Crypto.com Arena; 18,997	0–2
3	October 28	Portland	W 111–98	De'Aaron Fox (24)	Domantas Sabonis (13)	Domantas Sabonis (7)	Golden 1 Center; 16,426	1–2
4	October 29	@ Utah	W 113–96	Domantas Sabonis (28)	Domantas Sabonis (11)	DeMar DeRozan (8)	Delta Center; 18,175	2–2

November: 7–9 (home: 3–5; road: 4–4)

Game	Date	Team	Score	High points	High rebounds	High assists	Location Attendance	Record
5	November 1	@ Atlanta	W 123–115	De'Aaron Fox (31)	Domantas Sabonis (14)	Monk, Sabonis (6)	State Farm Arena; 15,156	3–2
6	November 2	@ Toronto	L 128–131 (OT)	DeMar DeRozan (33)	Domantas Sabonis (20)	Domantas Sabonis (10)	Scotiabank Arena; 19,815	3–3
7	November 4	@ Miami	W 111–110	De'Aaron Fox (28)	Domantas Sabonis (16)	Domantas Sabonis (7)	Kaseya Center; 19,604	4–3
8	November 6	Toronto	W 122–107	DeMar DeRozan (27)	Keegan Murray (12)	Domantas Sabonis (13)	Golden 1 Center; 16,026	5–3
9	November 8	L.A. Clippers	L 98–107	De'Aaron Fox (31)	Domantas Sabonis (12)	DeRozan, Sabonis (6)	Golden 1 Center; 17,832	5–4
10	November 10	@ Phoenix	W 127–118 (OT)	DeMar DeRozan (34)	Keegan Murray (14)	De'Aaron Fox (8)	Footprint Center; 17,071	6–4
11	November 11	@ San Antonio	L 96–116	De'Aaron Fox (24)	Domantas Sabonis (12)	DeMar DeRozan (6)	Frost Bank Center; 17,163	6–5
12	November 13	Phoenix	W 127–104	De'Aaron Fox (29)	Domantas Sabonis (10)	De'Aaron Fox (10)	Golden 1 Center; 16,204	7–5
13	November 15	Minnesota	L 126–130 (OT)	De'Aaron Fox (60)	Domantas Sabonis (12)	De'Aaron Fox (7)	Golden 1 Center; 16,478	7–6
14	November 16	Utah	W 121–117	De'Aaron Fox (49)	Keegan Murray (6)	De'Aaron Fox (9)	Golden 1 Center; 16,568	8–6
15	November 18	Atlanta	L 108–109	Keon Ellis (33)	Trey Lyles (10)	De'Aaron Fox (7)	Golden 1 Center; 16,333	8–7
16	November 22	@ L.A. Clippers	L 88–104	De'Aaron Fox (29)	Domantas Sabonis (15)	De'Aaron Fox (7)	Intuit Dome; 16,228	8–8
17	November 24	Brooklyn	L 103–108	De'Aaron Fox (31)	Domantas Sabonis (18)	Domantas Sabonis (7)	Golden 1 Center; 16,750	8–9
18	November 25	Oklahoma City	L 109–130	DeMar DeRozan (30)	Murray, Sabonis (10)	DeMar DeRozan (6)	Golden 1 Center; 17,832	8–10
19	November 27	@ Minnesota	W 115–104	Monk, Sabonis (27)	Domantas Sabonis (12)	Malik Monk (9)	Target Center; 18,978	9–10
20	November 29	@ Portland	L 106–115	Malik Monk (29)	Domantas Sabonis (14)	Domantas Sabonis (11)	Moda Center; 17,565	9–11

December: 5–8 (home: 3–6; road: 2–2)

Game	Date	Team	Score	High points	High rebounds	High assists	Location Attendance	Record
21	December 1	San Antonio	L 125–127	DeMar DeRozan (28)	Domantas Sabonis (13)	De'Aaron Fox (9)	Golden 1 Center; 16,014	9–12
22	December 3	Houston	W 120–111	Domantas Sabonis (27)	Murray, Sabonis (7)	Malik Monk (12)	Golden 1 Center; 15,019	10–12
23	December 5	@ Memphis	L 110–115	DeMar DeRozan (26)	Domantas Sabonis (13)	Domantas Sabonis (6)	FedExForum; 15,776	10–13
24	December 6	@ San Antonio	W 140–113	DeMar DeRozan (23)	Domantas Sabonis (16)	De'Aaron Fox (8)	Frost Bank Center; 16,796	11–13
25	December 8	Utah	W 141–97	Kevin Huerter (26)	Damontas Sabonis (12)	De'Aaron Fox (9)	Golden 1 Center; 15,706	12–13
26	December 12	@ New Orleans	W 111–109	Domantas Sabonis (32)	Domantas Sabonis (20)	Malik Monk (9)	Smoothie King Center; 15,488	13–13
27	December 16	Denver	L 129–130	De'Aaron Fox (29)	Domantas Sabonis (14)	Malik Monk (10)	Golden 1 Center; 16,936	13–14
28	December 19	L.A. Lakers	L 100–113	De'Aaron Fox (26)	Domantas Sabonis (12)	Domantas Sabonis (9)	Golden 1 Center; 17,832	13–15
29	December 21	L.A. Lakers	L 99–103	De'Aaron Fox (31)	Domantas Sabonis (19)	Malik Monk (8)	Golden 1 Center; 17,832	13–16
30	December 22	Indiana	L 95–122	De'Aaron Fox (23)	Damontas Sabonis (21)	De'Aaron Fox (7)	Golden 1 Center; 17,832	13–17
31	December 26	Detroit	L 113–114	De'Aaron Fox (26)	Keegan Murray (12)	DeRozan, Fox, Len (4)	Golden 1 Center; 17,832	13–18
32	December 28	@ L.A. Lakers	L 122–132	De'Aaron Fox (29)	Damontas Sabonis (12)	De'Aaron Fox (12)	Crypto.com Arena; 18,997	13–19
33	December 30	Dallas	W 110–100	De'Aaron Dox (33)	Damontas Sabonis (16)	Damontas Sabonis (7)	Golden 1 Center	14–19

January: 10–4 (home: 6–0; road: 4–4)

Game	Date	Team	Score	High points	High rebounds	High assists	Location Attendance	Record
34	January 1	Philadelphia	W 113–107	De'Aaron Fox (35)	Domantas Sabonis (21)	Domantas Sabonis (7)	Golden 1 Center; 16,024	15–19
35	January 3	Memphis	W 138–133	Malik Monk (31)	Domantas Sabonis (10)	Monk, Sabonis (6)	Golden 1 Center; 16,601	16–19
36	January 5	@ Golden State	W 129–99	Malik Monk (26)	Domantas Sabonis (13)	Domantas Sabonis (12)	Chase Center; 18,064	17–19
37	January 6	Miami	W 123–118 (2OT)	DeMar DeRozan (30)	Domantas Sabonis (18)	Domantas Sabonis (11)	Golden 1 Center; 17,832	18–19
38	January 10	@ Boston	W 114–97	DeMar DeRozan (24)	Damontas Sabonis (28)	DeMar DeRozan (9)	TD Garden; 19,156	19–19
39	January 12	@ Chicago	W 124–119	De'Aaron Fox (26)	Domantas Sabonis (15)	Malik Monk (9)	United Center; 18,233	20–19
40	January 14	@ Milwaukee	L 115–130	DeMar DeRozan (28)	De'Aaron Fox (11)	Domantas Sabonis (9)	Fiserv Forum; 17,341	20–20
41	January 16	Houston	W 132–127	DeMar DeRozan (33)	Domantas Sabonis (14)	Malik Monk (9)	Golden 1 Center; 18,227	21–20
42	January 19	Washington	W 123–100	Domantas Sabonis (29)	Domantas Sabonis (18)	De'Aaron Fox (13)	Golden 1 Center; 17,832	22–20
43	January 22	Golden State	W 123–117	DeMar DeRozan (32)	Domantas Sabonis (18)	Malik Monk (9)	Golden 1 Center; 17,832	23–20
44	January 23	@ Denver	L 123–132	DeMar DeRozan (24)	Domantas Sabonis (19)	Domantas Sabonis (8)	Ball Arena; 19,676	23–21
45	January 25	@ New York	L 120–143	Malik Monk (31)	Domantas Sabonis (13)	Domantas Sabonis (12)	Madison Square Garden; 19,812	23–22
46	January 27	@ Brooklyn	W 110–96	De'Aaron Fox (30)	Domantas Sabonis (22)	Domantas Sabonis (10)	Barclays Center; 16,093	24–22
47	January 29	@ Philadelphia	L 104–117	Malik Monk (21)	Domantas Sabonis (14)	Domantas Sabonis (11)	Wells Fargo Center; 19,770	24–23

February: 6–5 (home: 2–2; road: 4–3)

Game	Date	Team	Score	High points	High rebounds	High assists	Location Attendance	Record
48	February 1	@ Oklahoma City	L 110–144	De'Aaron Fox (20)	Domantas Sabonis (7)	Malik Monk (7)	Paycom Center; 18,203	24–24
49	February 3	@ Minnesota	W 116–114	DeMar DeRozan (33)	Domantas Sabonis (11)	DeMar DeRozan (7)	Target Center; 18,978	25–24
50	February 5	Orlando	L 111–130	Domantas Sabonis (21)	Domantas Sabonis (13)	Devin Carter (4)	Golden 1 Center; 18,074	25–25
51	February 6	@ Portland	L 102–108	DeRozan, LaVine (22)	Domantas Sabonis (14)	DeMar DeRozan (7)	Moda Center; 16,953	25–26
52	February 8	New Orleans	W 123–118	Domantas Sabonis (27)	Domantas Sabonis (16)	Malik Monk (7)	Golden 1 Center; 17,832	26–26
53	February 10	@ Dallas	W 129–128 (OT)	DeMar DeRozan (42)	Domantas Sabonis (15)	Monk, Sabonis (8)	American Airlines Center; 19,726	27–26
54	February 12	@ New Orleans	W 119–111	Keon Ellis (27)	Domantas Sabonis (15)	Zach LaVine (7)	Smoothie King Center; 17,444	28–26
55	February 13	@ New Orleans	L 133–140 (OT)	Zach LaVine (32)	Domantas Sabonis (28)	Zach LaVine (10)	Smoothie King Center; 16,686	28–27
All-Star Game
56	February 21	Golden State	L 108–132	DeMar DeRozan (34)	Domantas Sabonis (14)	Domantas Sabonis (9)	Golden 1 Center; 18,098	28–28
57	February 24	Charlotte	W 130–88	Zach LaVine (42)	Domantas Sabonis (10)	Malik Monk (10)	Golden 1 Center; 17,832	29–28
58	February 26	@ Utah	W 118–101	Keegan Murray (26)	Monk, Sabonis (9)	DeMar DeRozan (8)	Delta Center; 18,175	30–28

March: 6–11 (home: 4–5; road: 2–6)

Game	Date	Team	Score	High points	High rebounds	High assists	Location Attendance	Record
59	March 1	@ Houston	W 113–103	DeMar DeRozan (21)	Jonas Valančiūnas (14)	DeMar DeRozan (6)	Toyota Center; 18,055	31–28
60	March 3	@ Dallas	W 122–98	Zach LaVine (22)	Lyles, Valančiūnas (9)	Malik Monk (8)	American Airlines Center; 19,711	32–28
61	March 5	@ Denver	L 110–116	DeMar DeRozan (35)	Jonas Valančiūnas (13)	LaVine, Valančiūnas (6)	Ball Arena; 19,618	32–29
62	March 7	San Antonio	W 127–109	Zach LaVine (36)	Jonas Valančiūnas (12)	DeMar DeRozan (7)	Golden 1 Center; 18,332	33–29
63	March 9	@ L.A. Clippers	L 110–111 (OT)	DeMar DeRozan (31)	Jonas Valančiūnas (17)	DeMar DeRozan (10)	Intuit Dome; 17,927	33–30
64	March 10	New York	L 104–133	Malik Monk (21)	Jonas Valančiūnas (13)	DeMar DeRozan (5)	Golden 1 Center; 16,539	33–31
65	March 13	@ Golden State	L 104–130	DeMar DeRozan (23)	Jonas Valančiūnas (9)	DeMar DeRozan (7)	Chase Center; 18,064	33–32
66	March 14	@ Phoenix	L 106–122	DeMar DeRozan (23)	Domantas Sabonis (11)	Domantas Sabonis (12)	PHX Arena; 17,071	33–33
67	March 17	Memphis	W 132–122	Malik Monk (28)	Lyles, Murray (9)	DeMar DeRozan (8)	Golden 1 Center; 16,205	34–33
68	March 19	Cleveland	W 123–119	DeMar DeRozan (27)	Jonas Valančiūnas (13)	Malik Monk (8)	Golden 1 Center; 15,919	35–33
69	March 20	Chicago	L 116–128	Malik Monk (34)	Keegan Murray (9)	DeRozan, LaVine, Monk (5)	Golden 1 Center; 16,960	35–34
70	March 22	Milwaukee	L 108–114	DeMar DeRozan (22)	Ellis, Murray (9)	Keon Ellis (6)	Golden 1 Center; 16,911	35–35
71	March 24	Boston	L 95–113	DeMar DeRozan (20)	Domantas Sabonis (17)	DeMar DeRozan (10)	Golden 1 Center; 15,855	35–36
72	March 25	Oklahoma City	L 105–121	Keegan Murray (28)	Domantas Sabonis (12)	LaVine, Sabonis (7)	Golden 1 Center; 16,060	35–37
73	March 27	Portland	W 128–107	Zach LaVine (29)	Domantas Sabonis (19)	DeMar DeRozan (10)	Golden 1 Center; 16,671	36–37
74	March 29	@ Orlando	L 91–121	DeMar DeRozan (21)	Domantas Sabonis (13)	Fultz, Sabonis (4)	Kia Center; 18,846	36–38
75	March 31	@ Indiana	L 109–111	DeMar DeRozan (31)	Domantas Sabonis (16)	DeMar DeRozan (8)	Gainbridge Fieldhouse; 16,341	36–39

April: 4–3 (home: 1–2; road: 3–1)

Game	Date	Team	Score	High points	High rebounds	High assists	Location Attendance	Record
76	April 2	@ Washington	L 111–116	DeMar DeRozan (29)	Domantas Sabonis (16)	DeMar DeRozan (8)	Capital One Arena; 15,018	36–40
77	April 4	@ Charlotte	W 125–102	Zach LaVine (25)	Domantas Sabonis (11)	Domantas Sabonis (7)	Spectrum Center; 15,896	37–40
78	April 6	@ Cleveland	W 120–113	Zach LaVine (37)	Domantas Sabonis (9)	DeRozan, Sabonis (7)	Rocket Arena; 19,432	38–40
79	April 7	@ Detroit	W 127–117	Zach LaVine (43)	Domantas Sabonis (15)	Domantas Sabonis (10)	Little Caesars Arena; 19,208	39–40
80	April 9	Denver	L 116–124	Zach LaVine (27)	Domantas Sabonis (12)	Zach LaVine (11)	Golden 1 Center; 16,161	39–41
81	April 11	L.A. Clippers	L 100–101	Zach LaVine (26)	Domantas Sabonis (16)	DeMar DeRozan (8)	Golden 1 Center; 16,435	39–42
82	April 13	Phoenix	W 109–98	Jonas Valančiūnas (22)	Domantas Sabonis (12)	Domantas Sabonis (6)	Golden 1 Center; 17,832	40–42

2024–25 season schedule

=== Play-in ===
2025 play-in game log
Total: 0–1 (Home: 0–1; Road: 0–0)
Play-in: 0–1 (home: 0–1; road: 0–0)

Game	Date	Team	Score	High points	High rebounds	High assists	Location Attendance	Record
1	April 16	Dallas	L 106–120	DeMar DeRozan (33)	Domantas Sabonis (13)	Zach LaVine (9)	Golden 1 Center; 17,939	0–1

2024–25 season schedule

=== NBA Cup ===
The groups were revealed during the tournament announcement on July 12, 2024.

==== West Group A ====
Pos	Team	Pld	W	L	PF	PA	PD	Qualification
1	Houston Rockets	4	3	1	454	414	+40	Advance to knockout stage
2	Los Angeles Clippers	4	2	2	427	411	+16	
3	Minnesota Timberwolves	4	2	2	418	431	−13	
4	Portland Trail Blazers	4	2	2	430	457	−27	
5	Sacramento Kings	4	1	3	429	445	−16	

Source: NBA
Rules for classification: Tiebreakers

== Player statistics ==
Legend
GP	Games played	GS	Games started	MPG	Minutes per game
FG%	Field-goal percentage	3P%	3-point field-goal percentage	FT%	Free-throw percentage
RPG	Rebounds per game	APG	Assists per game	SPG	Steals per game
BPG	Blocks per game	PPG	Points per game

=== Regular season ===
Sacramento Kings statistics
Player	GP	GS	MPG	FG%	3P%	FT%	RPG	APG	SPG	BPG	PPG
Devin Carter	36	0	11.0	.370	.295	.591	2.1	1.1	.6	.1	3.8
Isaiah Crawford	15	0	3.1	.455	.200	.500	.5	.1	.1	.1	.9
Jae Crowder	9	2	11.4	.318	.267	.833	2.2	.7	.3	.0	2.6
Terence Davis	1	0	8.0	.000	.000		1.0	1.0	.0	.0	.0
DeMar DeRozan	77	77	35.9	.477	.328	.857	3.9	4.4	.8	.4	22.2
Keon Ellis	80	28	24.4	.489	.433	.849	2.7	1.5	1.5	.8	8.3
De'Aaron Fox^{†}	45	45	37.0	.469	.322	.829	5.0	6.1	1.5	.4	25.0
Markelle Fultz	21	0	8.8	.418	.500	1.000	1.0	1.3	.5	.1	2.9
Kevin Huerter^{†}	43	15	20.9	.413	.302	.714	2.8	1.7	.8	.4	7.9
Colby Jones^{†}	24	0	5.4	.423	.400		1.0	.3	.3	.3	1.1
Isaac Jones	40	0	7.6	.651	.375	.639	1.4	.3	.1	.3	3.4
Mason Jones	10	0	4.5	.500	.125	.800	.9	1.1	.0	.1	2.3
Skal Labissière	4	0	3.0	.500	1.000		.8	.3	.0	.0	1.3
Jake LaRavia^{†}	19	0	19.3	.438	.385	.579	2.8	1.3	.9	.2	6.1
Zach LaVine^{†}	32	32	36.6	.511	.446	.874	3.5	3.8	.6	.1	22.4
Alex Len^{†}	36	3	7.2	.537	.167	.538	1.8	.8	.2	.5	1.4
Trey Lyles	69	5	19.6	.420	.340	.700	4.6	1.2	.6	.3	6.5
Doug McDermott	42	3	8.1	.427	.436	.600	.5	.2	.1	.0	3.5
Jordan McLaughlin^{†}	28	0	6.8	.364	.385	.688	.8	.9	.4	.0	1.9
Malik Monk	65	45	31.6	.439	.325	.865	3.8	5.6	.9	.6	17.2
Keegan Murray	76	76	34.3	.444	.343	.833	6.7	1.4	.8	.9	12.4
Orlando Robinson^{†}	9	0	6.3	.412	.200	.571	1.6	1.0	.3	.1	2.1
Domantas Sabonis	70	70	34.7	.590	.417	.754	13.9	6.0	.7	.4	19.1
Terry Taylor	3	0	2.0	.000			.3	.7	.0	.0	.0
Jonas Valančiūnas^{†}	32	9	16.9	.556	.100	.847	7.0	1.8	.5	.6	8.7

- ^{†} Denotes player spent time with another team in the season. Stats reflect time with the Kings only.

== Transactions ==
=== Trades ===
June 28, 2024	To Sacramento Kings Jalen McDaniels	To Toronto Raptors Davion Mitchell; Sasha Vezenkov; Draft rights to Jamal Shead (No. 45); 2025 POR second-round pick
July 8, 2024	Three-team trade
July 8, 2024	To Sacramento Kings DeMar DeRozan (sign-and-trade) (from Chicago)	To Chicago Bulls Chris Duarte (from Sacramento); RaiQuan Gray (two-way contract) (from San Antonio); Two future second-round picks (from Sacramento); Cash considerations (from Sacramento)
July 8, 2024	To San Antonio Spurs Harrison Barnes (from Sacramento); 2031 first-round pick swap right (from Sacramento)
February 3, 2025	Three-team trade
February 3, 2025	To Sacramento Kings Sidy Cissoko (from San Antonio); Zach LaVine (from Chicago); 2025 CHA protected first-round pick (from San Antonio); 2025 CHI second-round pick (from San Antonio); 2027 SAS first-round pick (from San Antonio); 2028 DEN protected second-round pick (from San Antonio); 2028 SAC second-round pick (from Chicago); 2031 MIN first-round pick (from San Antonio)	To Chicago Bulls Zach Collins (from San Antonio); Kevin Huerter (from Sacramento); Tre Jones (from San Antonio); 2025 CHI first-round pick (from San Antonio)
February 3, 2025	To San Antonio Spurs De'Aaron Fox (from Sacramento); Jordan McLaughlin (from Sacramento)
February 5, 2025	To Sacramento Kings Jonas Valančiūnas	To Washington Wizards Sidy Cissoko; 2028 DEN protected second-round pick 2029 SAC second-round pick
February 6, 2025	Three-team trade
February 6, 2025	To Sacramento Kings Jake LaRavia (from Memphis)	To Memphis Grizzlies Marvin Bagley III (from Washington); Johnny Davis (from Washington); 2025 WAS second-round pick (from Washington); 2028 SAC second-round pick (from Sacramento)
February 6, 2025	To Washington Wizards Colby Jones (from Sacramento); Alex Len (from Sacramento); Marcus Smart (from Memphis); 2025 MEM protected first-round pick (from Memphis)

=== Free agency ===
==== Re-signed ====
Date	Player	Ref.
July 6	Malik Monk	
July 9	Alex Len	

==== Additions ====
Date	Player	Former Team	Ref.
July 3	Isaiah Crawford	Louisiana Tech Bulldogs	
July 3	Isaac Jones	Washington State Cougars	
July 7	Jordan McLaughlin	Minnesota Timberwolves	
July 24	Orlando Robinson	Miami Heat	
July 27	Boogie Ellis	USC Trojans	
August 14	Skal Labissière	Stockton Kings	
September 6	Terry Taylor	Chicago Bulls	
September 28	Brodric Thomas	Ontario Clippers	
November 27	Jae Crowder	Milwaukee Bucks	
