= Mo Bamba =

Ivorian-American basketball player (born 1998)

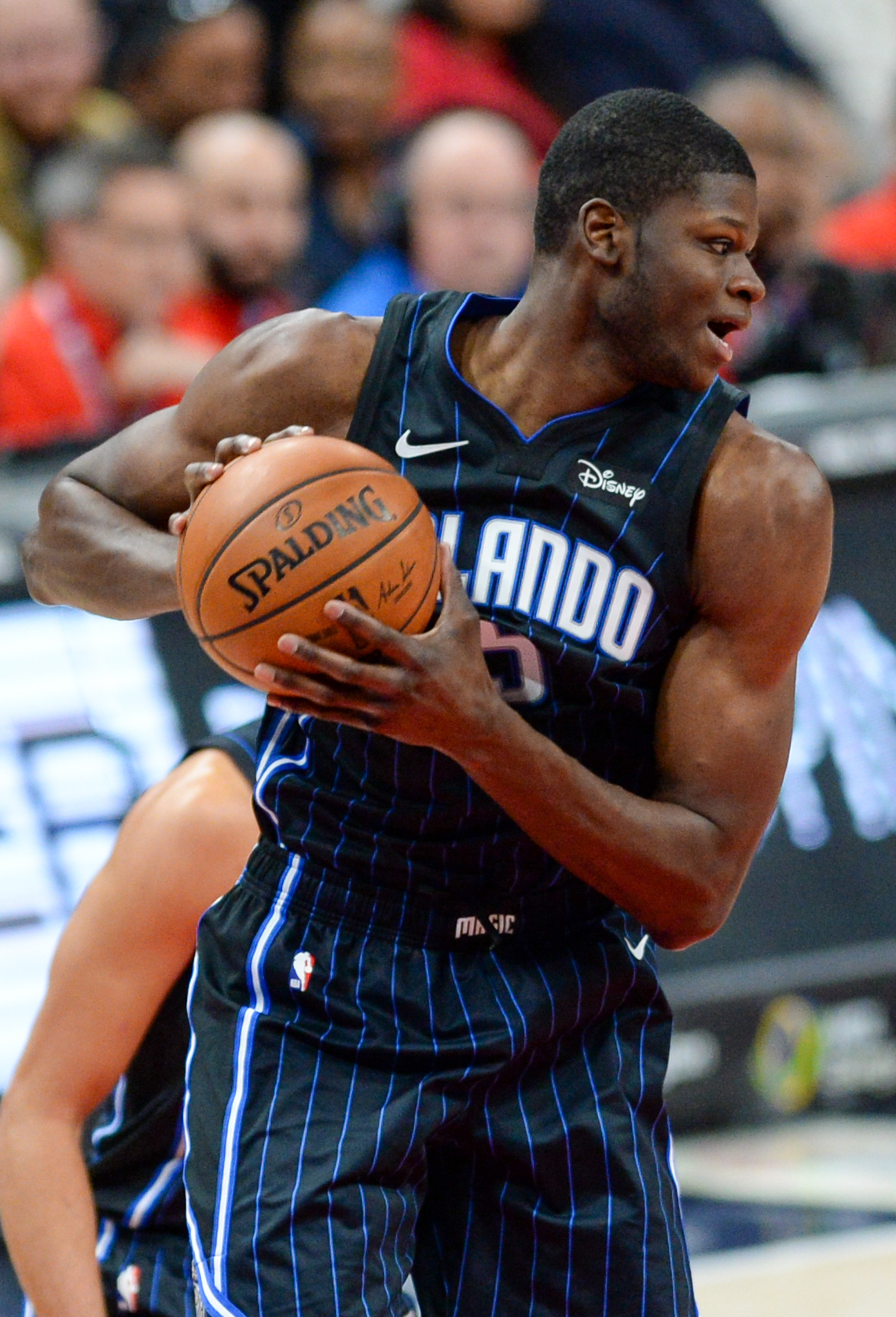
- Bamba with the Orlando Magic in 2019.

No. 44 – Utah Jazz
- Position: Center
- League: NBA

Personal information
- Born: May 12, 1998 (age 28) New York City, New York, U.S.
- Listed height: 7 ft 0 in (2.13 m)
- Listed weight: 231 lb (105 kg)

Career information
- High school: Cardigan Mountain School (Canaan, New Hampshire); Westtown School (Westtown Township, Pennsylvania)
- College: Texas (2017–2018)
- NBA draft: 2018: 1st round, 6th overall pick
- Drafted by: Orlando Magic
- Playing career: 2017–present

Career history
- 2018–2023: Orlando Magic
- 2023: Los Angeles Lakers
- 2023–2024: Philadelphia 76ers
- 2024–2025: Los Angeles Clippers
- 2024: →San Diego Clippers
- 2025: Birmingham Squadron
- 2025: New Orleans Pelicans
- 2025: Salt Lake City Stars
- 2025–2026: Toronto Raptors
- 2026: Salt Lake City Stars
- 2026–present: Utah Jazz

Career highlights
- Second-team All-Big 12 (2018); Big 12 All-Defensive Team (2018); Big 12 All-Newcomer Team (2018); McDonald's All-American (2017)
- Stats at NBA.com
- Stats at Basketball Reference
Medals
Men's basketball
Representing the United States
FIBA Americas U18 Championship
| Gold medal – first place | 2016 Chile | National team |

Mohamed Fakaba Bamba (born May 12, 1998) is an Ivorian-American professional basketball player for the Utah Jazz of the National Basketball Association (NBA). He played college basketball for the Texas Longhorns. He was highly regarded by scouts due to his 7 ft 10 in (2.39 m) wingspan and shooting ability. He attended Cardigan Mountain School in Canaan, New Hampshire, and Westtown School in West Chester, Pennsylvania, and was considered one of the top high school prospects for the class of 2017.

== Early life ==
Bamba was born on May 12, 1998, in Harlem, New York to Lancine Bamba and Aminata Johnson, who both emigrated from the Ivory Coast. Bamba's grandparents were born and brought up in present-day Mali. His older brother, Sidiki Johnson, played college basketball at Arizona, Providence, and Wabash Valley. Another member of his family, estranged brother Ibrahim Johnson, also played college basketball at multiple universities, including both Farmingdale State and Montevallo. Bamba first became interested in basketball at age six, inspired by the game's popularity in his hometown.

== High school career ==
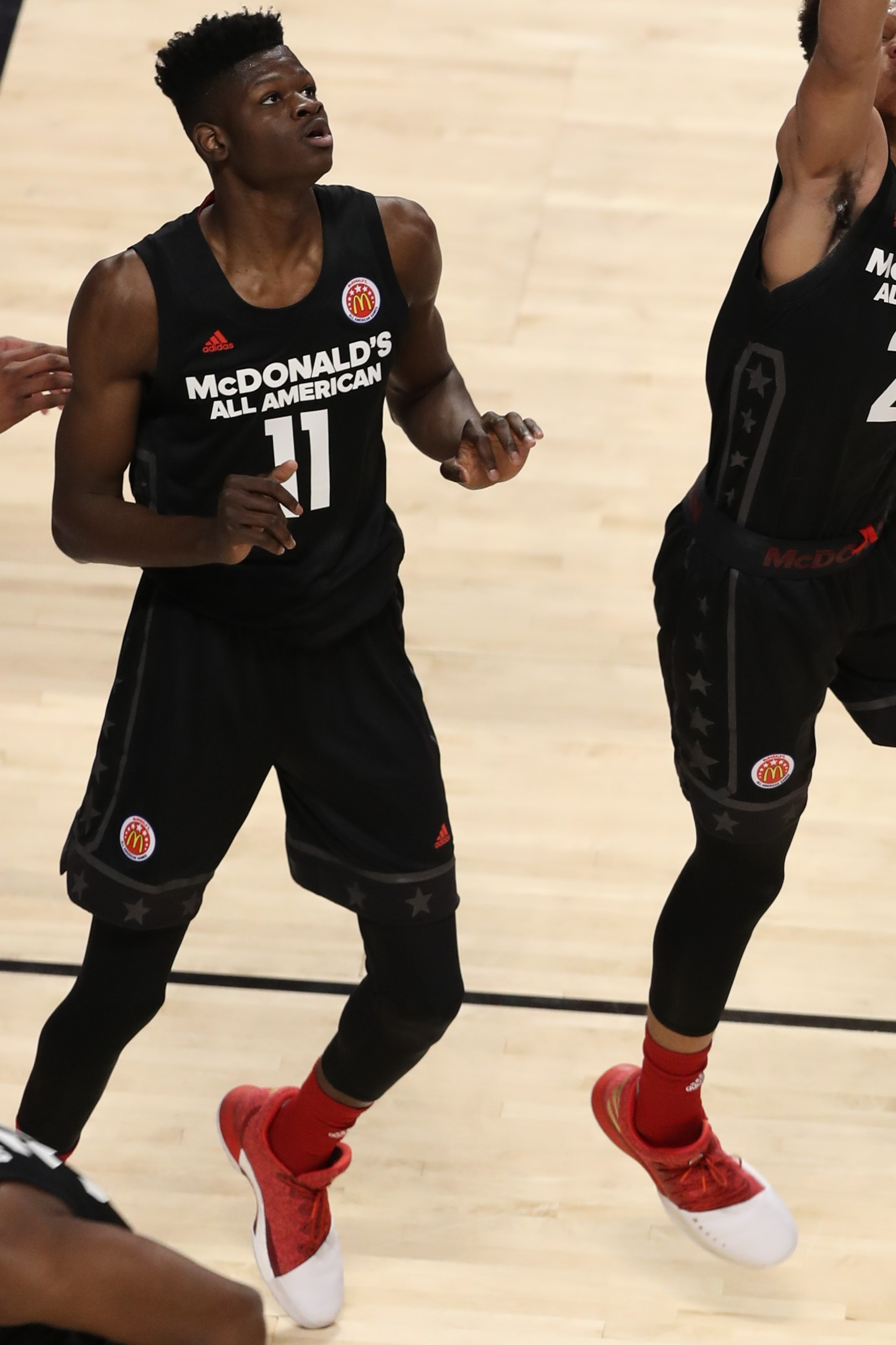
Bamba at the 2017 McDonald's All-American Boys Game

In eighth and ninth grade, Bamba attended Cardigan Mountain School, an all-boys boarding school in Canaan, New Hampshire.

After graduating from Cardigan, Bamba went on to Westtown School in Westtown, Pennsylvania. As a junior he averaged 14 points, 11 rebounds, and six blocks per game. He played in the 2017 McDonald's All American Game and the Nike Hoop Summit.

Bamba was rated as a five-star recruit and was ranked among the top recruits in his class. His final four schools were Kentucky, Duke, Texas and Michigan. Ultimately, Bamba chose to play for the University of Texas for his college career. Before playing a single game for Texas, his half-brother Ibrahim Johnson posted a 22-minute-long video on Facebook Live, talking about how there were some illegal benefits from a Michigan-based investor involved during the decision-making and that he was reporting the information to the NCAA. However, the NCAA reported that nothing involved there would ultimately affect Bamba's eligibility for his freshman season.

College recruiting
| Name | Hometown | School | Height | Weight | Commit date |
|---|---|---|---|---|---|
| Mo Bamba; C | Harlem, N.Y. | Westtown School | 7 ft 1 in (2.16 m) | 216 lb (98 kg) | May 18, 2017 |
| Mo Bamba; C | Recruit ratings: Scout: Rivals: 247Sports: ESPN: (96) | | | | |
Overall recruit ranking: Scout: 2, 1 (C) Rivals: 2, 1 (C) ESPN: 3, 2 (C), 1 (NY)
Note: In many cases, Scout, Rivals, 247Sports, On3, and ESPN may conflict in their listings of height and weight.; In these cases, the average was taken. ESPN grades are on a 100-point scale.; Sources: "Texas 2017 Commits". Rivals.; "2017 Team Ranking". Rivals.; "Texas 2017 Commits". 247Sports.

== College career ==
Bamba made his official college debut on November 10, 2017, against Northwestern State, recording 15 points and eight rebounds in a blowout win that night. Eight days later, he recorded 13 points, 10 rebounds, and five blocks in a blowout win against Lipscomb. On December 30, Bamba recorded a season-high 22 points, 15 rebounds, and eight blocks in a loss to Kansas. On New Year's Day 2018, Bamba would record a then-season-high 16 rebounds with 10 points in a 74–70 overtime win over Iowa State. He would record a new career-high in points scored with 25 points scored with 15 rebounds in an 85–72 win over Ole Miss on January 27, 2018, five days after recording his previous high of 24 points in a win over Iowa State. On February 17, Bamba would record a new career-high of 18 rebounds with 10 points scored in a 77–66 win over #23 ranked Oklahoma, five days after tying his previous career-high of 16 rebounds with 16 points in a close 74–73 double overtime loss to Baylor. At the end of the regular season for Texas, Bamba was named a member of the Big 12's All-Newcomer Team and All-Defensive Team, as well as being named a member of the All-Big 12 Second Team. He averaged 12.9 points, 10.5 rebounds, and 0.5 assists per game.

Following Texas's loss in the 2018 NCAA men's basketball tournament to Nevada, Bamba announced his intention to forgo his final three seasons of collegiate eligibility and declare for the 2018 NBA draft, where he was expected to be a lottery selection.

== Professional career ==
At the 2018 NBA combine, Bamba measured at 7 ft 0 in (2.13 m) tall and measured a 7 ft 10 in (2.39 m) wingspan, breaking the record previously held by Edy Tavares. At a private workout, Bamba reportedly ran faster than most of the NBA, including MVP Russell Westbrook, since he had a 3.04 3/4 court sprint. Bamba refused to work out with the Memphis Grizzlies before the draft, and told them not to draft him.

=== Orlando Magic (2018–2023) ===
On June 21, 2018, Bamba was selected with the sixth overall pick by the Orlando Magic in the 2018 NBA draft. On July 3, 2018, Bamba officially signed a rookie-scale contract with the Magic. He made his professional debut on October 17, 2018, recording 13 points, seven rebounds, and two blocks off the bench in a 104–101 win over the Miami Heat.

On May 3, 2021, Bamba scored 22 points and grabbed a then-career-high 15 rebounds in 29 minutes off the bench in a 119–112 win over the Detroit Pistons.

On October 29, 2021, Bamba grabbed a career-high 18 rebounds and scored 14 points during a 110–109 loss to the Toronto Raptors. On January 19, 2022, Bamba scored a career-high 32 points on seven three-pointers made in a 123–110 loss to the Philadelphia 76ers.

On July 1, 2022, Bamba re-signed with the Magic on a two-year deal. On December 29, he was suspended by the NBA for one game without pay due to coming off the bench during an altercation in a game against the Detroit Pistons the day before. On February 4, 2023, Bamba was suspended by the NBA for four games without pay due to his role in an altercation during a game against the Minnesota Timberwolves the day before. During the altercation, Bamba left the Magic bench area and threw punches at Timberwolves guard Austin Rivers.

=== Los Angeles Lakers (2023) ===
On February 9, 2023, Bamba was traded to the Los Angeles Lakers in a four-team trade involving the Los Angeles Clippers and Denver Nuggets. On March 5, during a 113–105 win over the Golden State Warriors, he played two minutes before suffering a left ankle injury and leaving the game. Four days later, the Lakers announced that Bamba had been diagnosed with a high left ankle sprain and would be sidelined for at least four weeks. He returned to action on 7 April, playing as a substitute in a game against the Phoenix Suns.

On June 29, 2023, Bamba was waived by the Los Angeles Lakers.

=== Philadelphia 76ers (2023–2024) ===
On July 9, 2023, Bamba signed a one-year deal with the Philadelphia 76ers.

=== Los Angeles Clippers (2024–2025) ===
On July 6, 2024, Bamba signed a one-year deal with the Los Angeles Clippers.

On February 1, 2025, Bamba, with P. J. Tucker, a 2030 second-round pick and cash considerations were traded to the Utah Jazz in exchange for Drew Eubanks and Patty Mills, but he was waived the next day.

=== New Orleans Pelicans (2025) ===
On March 10, 2025, Bamba signed a 10-day contract with the New Orleans Pelicans, for whom he played in four games.

=== Salt Lake City Stars (2025) ===
On September 25, 2025, Bamba signed with the Utah Jazz but was waived after preseason training camp.

On October 27, 2025, he joined the Salt Lake City Stars.

=== Toronto Raptors (2025–2026) ===
On December 29, 2025, Bamba signed a one-year contract with the Toronto Raptors. He made two appearances for Toronto, averaging no points and one rebound. On January 6, 2026, Bamba was waived by the Raptors.

=== Utah Jazz (2026–present) ===
On March 8, 2026, Bamba signed a 10–day contract with the Utah Jazz. In two appearances for the Jazz, he recorded averages of 5.0 points, 10.0 rebounds, and 0.5 assists. Out with an illness before a three-game road trip, Bamba's contract was terminated by the team on March 12.

On July 8, 2026, Bamba re–signed with the Jazz on a two-year contract.

== National team career ==
Because of his Ivorian heritage, Bamba was eligible to play for the Ivory Coast national team. He was on the preliminary roster for the 2023 FIBA Basketball World Cup. Bamba was also selected to be on the Olympic Qualifying Tournament roster for the 2024 Summer Olympics. However, Bamba did not make his debut.

== Career statistics ==
Legend
| GP | Games played | GS | Games started | MPG | Minutes per game |
| FG% | Field goal percentage | 3P% | 3-point field goal percentage | FT% | Free throw percentage |
| RPG | Rebounds per game | APG | Assists per game | SPG | Steals per game |
| BPG | Blocks per game | PPG | Points per game | **Bold** | Career high |

=== NBA ===
==== Regular season ====
| Year | Team | GP | GS | MPG | FG% | 3P% | FT% | RPG | APG | SPG | BPG | PPG |
|---|---|---|---|---|---|---|---|---|---|---|---|---|
| 2018–19 | Orlando | 47 | 1 | 16.3 | .481 | .300 | .587 | 5.0 | .8 | .3 | 1.4 | 6.2 |
| 2019–20 | Orlando | 62 | 0 | 14.2 | .462 | .346 | .674 | 4.9 | .7 | .4 | 1.4 | 5.4 |
| 2020–21 | Orlando | 46 | 5 | 15.8 | .472 | .322 | .682 | 5.8 | .8 | .3 | 1.3 | 8.0 |
| 2021–22 | Orlando | **71** | **69** | **25.7** | .480 | .381 | .781 | 8.1 | **1.2** | **.5** | **1.7** | **10.6** |
| 2022–23 | Orlando | 40 | 6 | 17.0 | .495 | **.398** | .686 | 4.6 | 1.1 | .3 | 1.0 | 7.3 |
| 2022–23 | L.A. Lakers | 9 | 1 | 9.8 | .407 | .313 | .545 | 4.6 | .4 | .1 | .6 | 3.7 |
| 2023–24 | Philadelphia | 57 | 17 | 13.0 | .490 | .391 | .680 | 4.2 | .7 | .4 | 1.1 | 4.4 |
| 2024–25 | L.A. Clippers | 28 | 2 | 12.6 | .466 | .300 | .680 | 4.3 | .6 | .3 | 1.0 | 4.6 |
| 2024–25 | New Orleans | 4 | 0 | 15.3 | .444 | .000 | **1.000** | 6.3 | .5 | .0 | .8 | 2.5 |
| 2025–26 | Toronto | 2 | 0 | 3.0 | .000 | – | – | 1.0 | .0 | .0 | .5 | .0 |
| 2025–26 | Utah | 2 | 0 | 19.0 | **.556** | – | – | **10.0** | .5 | .0 | 1.0 | 5.0 |
| Career | | 368 | 101 | 16.7 | .477 | .356 | .682 | 5.4 | .8 | .4 | 1.3 | 6.7 |

==== Playoffs ====
| Year | Team | GP | GS | MPG | FG% | 3P% | FT% | RPG | APG | SPG | BPG | PPG |
|---|---|---|---|---|---|---|---|---|---|---|---|---|
| 2023 | L.A. Lakers | 3 | 0 | 3.4 | .000 | .000 | — | 1.0 | .3 | .0 | .3 | .0 |
| Career | | 3 | 0 | 3.4 | .000 | .000 | — | 1.0 | .3 | .0 | .3 | .0 |

=== College ===
| Year | Team | GP | GS | MPG | FG% | 3P% | FT% | RPG | APG | SPG | BPG | PPG |
|---|---|---|---|---|---|---|---|---|---|---|---|---|
| 2017–18 | Texas | 29 | 28 | 30.2 | .603 | .280 | .678 | 10.4 | .5 | .8 | 3.7 | 12.9 |

== Personal life ==
During his time growing up in Harlem, Bamba was friends with rapper Sheck Wes. Their relationship would eventually inspire the hit single "Mo Bamba".

In October 2020, Mo Bamba's brother, Ibrahim Johnson, was murdered.
