= Antonio Reeves =

American basketball player (born 2000)

No. 12 – Partizan Belgrade
- Position: Shooting guard / small forward
- League: Serbian SuperLeague; ABA League; EuroLeague

Personal information
- Born: November 20, 2000 (age 25) Chicago, Illinois, U.S.
- Listed height: 6 ft 5 in (1.96 m)
- Listed weight: 205 lb (93 kg)

Career information
- High school: Shadow Mountain (Phoenix, Arizona); Simeon (Chicago, Illinois)
- College: Illinois State (2019–2022); Kentucky (2022–2024)
- NBA draft: 2024: 2nd round, 47th overall pick
- Drafted by: Orlando Magic
- Playing career: 2024–present

Career history
- 2024–2025: New Orleans Pelicans
- 2024–2025: →Birmingham Squadron
- 2025–2026: Charlotte Hornets
- 2025–2026: →Greensboro Swarm
- 2026–present: Partizan

Career highlights
- NBA G League champion (2026); Third-team All-American – USBWA, SN (2024); First-team All-SEC (2024); SEC co-Sixth Man of the Year (2023); Second-team All-MVC (2022)
- Stats at NBA.com
- Stats at Basketball Reference

Antonio Reeves (born November 20, 2000) is an American professional basketball player for Partizan of the Serbian SuperLeague, the ABA League, and the EuroLeague. He played college basketball for the Illinois State Redbirds and the Kentucky Wildcats, and was drafted in the second round of the 2024 NBA draft by the Orlando Magic.

== High school career ==
After a prep career at Shadow Mountain High School in Phoenix and Simeon Career Academy in his hometown Chicago, Reeves committed to Illinois State over offers from several other mid-major programs.

== College career ==
=== Illinois State ===
Reeves was a key contributor for his first two seasons, earning a spot on the Missouri Valley Conference (MVC) all-bench team as a sophomore. He declared for the 2021 NBA draft but ultimately chose to return to the Redbirds for his junior season. In the 2021–22 season, Reeves averaged a career-high 20.1 points per game And was named second-team All-MVC, however, the team was not successful and coach Dan Muller was fired. With the coaching change, Reeves decided to transfer to a winning program.

=== Kentucky ===
Reeves ultimately chose Kentucky and coach John Calipari. As a senior, he mostly came off the bench for the Wildcats and ranked second on the team in scoring behind All-American Oscar Tshiebwe at 14.4 points per game. At the close of the season, Reeves was named the Southeastern Conference (SEC) co-Sixth Man of the Year. He again tested the NBA draft waters and considered another transfer, but ultimately chose to return to Kentucky for a fifth year granted to players whose eligibility was affected by the COVID-19 pandemic.

Entering his fifth year, Reeves was named preseason second-team All-SEC. As the season wore in, Reeves emerged as a key player for the Wildcats and senior presence for their talented recruiting class. In January 2024, he was named to the 25-man Wooden Award midseason watch list in recognition of his performance, along with teammate Reed Sheppard.

== Professional career ==
=== New Orleans Pelicans (2024–2025) ===
On June 27, 2024, Reeves was selected with the 47th overall pick by the Orlando Magic in the 2024 NBA draft, however, immediately on draft night, he was traded to the New Orleans Pelicans in exchange for two second-round pick swaps in 2030 and 2031. On July 23, he signed with the Pelicans. Throughout his rookie season, he has been assigned several times to the Birmingham Squadron. Reeves made his NBA debut on October 23, 2024, in a 123–111 win over the Chicago Bulls. On November 20, Reeves put up a career-high 34 points in a 128–100 loss to the Cleveland Cavaliers.

On July 3, 2025, Reeves was waived by the Pelicans. Still, Reeves joined the Pelicans for the 2025 NBA Summer League.

=== Charlotte Hornets (2025–2026) ===
On July 26, 2025, Reeves signed a two-way contract with the Charlotte Hornets.

On September 27, 2026, Reeves signed a training camp contract with the Minnesota Timberwolves. On 17 October, 2026, Reeves was waived.

=== Partizan (2026–present) ===
On October 21, 2026, Reeves signed with Partizan of the Serbian SuperLeague, the ABA League, and the EuroLeague.

== Career statistics ==
Legend
GP	Games played	GS	Games started	MPG	Minutes per game
FG%	Field goal percentage	3P%	3-point field goal percentage	FT%	Free throw percentage
RPG	Rebounds per game	APG	Assists per game	SPG	Steals per game
BPG	Blocks per game	PPG	Points per game	**Bold**	Career high

=== NBA ===
Year	Team	GP	GS	MPG	FG%	3P%	FT%	RPG	APG	SPG	BPG	PPG
2024–25	New Orleans	**44**	**6**	**15.0**	.456	.395	**.800**	**1.4**	**.9**	**.5**	**.1**	**6.9**
2025–26	Charlotte	10	0	6.8	**.500**	**.538**	–	.8	.3	.1	.0	2.7
Career		54	6	13.5	.459	.408	.800	1.3	.8	.4	.1	6.1

=== College ===
Year	Team	GP	GS	MPG	FG%	3P%	FT%	RPG	APG	SPG	BPG	PPG
2019–20	Illinois State	31	3	22.4	.384	.314	.659	2.5	.7	.6	.1	7.2
2020–21	Illinois State	25	24	29.9	.425	.306	.763	3.3	1.4	.4	.2	12.4
2021–22	Illinois State	33	**33**	**34.9**	.469	.390	.818	3.5	**1.8**	**1.1**	**.5**	20.1
2022–23	Kentucky	**34**	14	27.9	.416	.398	.783	2.1	1.1	.4	.2	14.4
2023–24	Kentucky	33	**33**	31.4	**.512**	**.447**	**.863**	**4.2**	1.6	.7	.2	**20.2**
Career		156	107	29.3	.452	.384	.801	3.1	1.3	.6	.2	15.1
