= Spencer Jones (basketball) =

American basketball player (born 2001)

No. 21 – Denver Nuggets
- Position: Power forward / small forward
- League: NBA

Personal information
- Born: June 14, 2001 (age 25) Shawnee Mission, Kansas, U.S.
- Listed height: 6 ft 7 in (2.01 m)
- Listed weight: 225 lb (102 kg)

Career information
- High school: Bishop Miege (Roeland Park, Kansas)
- College: Stanford (2019–2024)
- NBA draft: 2024: undrafted
- Playing career: 2024–present

Career history
- 2024–present: Denver Nuggets
- 2024–2026: →Grand Rapids Gold

Career highlights
- Second-team All-Pac-12 (2023)
- Stats at NBA.com
- Stats at Basketball Reference

Spencer Keith Jones (born June 14, 2001) is an American professional basketball player for the Denver Nuggets of the National Basketball Association (NBA). He played college basketball for the Stanford Cardinal.

== High school career ==
Jones attended Bishop Miege at Roeland Park, Kansas, leading the Stags to three state titles. As a senior, he led his team in scoring with 18.8 points, rebounds with 8.0, steals with 3.0 and blocks with 2.5 per game. Jones was considered a top 40 prospect in the class of 2019, where he was ranked 31 by Rivals, and 39 by 247Sports.

== College career ==
Jones played college basketball for the Stanford Cardinal, where he appeared in 146 games in five seasons and averaged 11.0 points, 4.1 rebounds, 1.2 assists and 1.1 steals all while shooting 43.9% from the field and 39.7% from the three-point line in 28.3 minutes per game. In 2023, he made the All-Pac-12 second team and ended up his college career as the school's all-time leader in games played with 146 and three-pointers with 315. Across his five seasons at Stanford, Jones developed a reputation as a durable, low-usage wing with strong perimeter shooting, defensive versatility and leadership experience, traits that would later shape his transition to the professional level.

Jones graduated from Stanford in 2024 with an undergraduate degree in Management Science and Engineering.

== Professional career ==
=== Denver Nuggets (2024–present) ===
==== Early career ====
After going undrafted in the 2024 NBA draft, Jones joined the Portland Trail Blazers for the 2024 NBA Summer League and on July 30, he signed a two-way contract with the Denver Nuggets. His production with Grand Rapids contrasted with a more limited NBA role, where he was primarily used in situational lineups rather than as a regular rotation player.

==== Breakthrough and increase in minutes (2025–26) ====
On July 3, 2025, Jones re-signed with the Nuggets. On November 22, Jones made his first career start with the Nuggets against the Sacramento Kings, in which he only scored a single point, and tallied four rebounds in his 24 minutes of playtime to a loss of 128-123. On November 28, 2025, Jones scored his first career high in points against the San Antonio Spurs, with Jones scoring 16 points in 27 minutes, he also tallied up nine rebounds, one assist, and one block. Then, on December 1, 2025, Jones would then put another career high in points against the Dallas Mavericks, where he scored 28 points in 39 minutes, he also had five rebounds to pair with his points.

During an injury stretch in December 2025, Jones was used as a starter alongside Nikola Jokić and Peyton Watson as the Nuggets adjusted their lineup in the absence of Aaron Gordon and Christian Braun. Despite the lineup's temporary nature, Denver maintained one of the league's most efficient offenses during that span, with Jones contributing through screening, floor spacing and off-ball movement rather than high-usage scoring. On December 1, 2025, Jones put another career high in points against the Dallas Mavericks, where he scored 28 points in 39 minutes, he also had five rebounds to pair with his points. Sports Illustrated cited Jones's efficiency and impact while starting games during Denver's injury-related rotation adjustments.

On February 5, 2026, following the trade of Hunter Tyson to the Brooklyn Nets, the Nuggets were slightly below the luxury tax, which allowed the team to convert Jones' two-way contract to a standard NBA contract on February 19.

Jones averaged a career-high 5.5 points and 3.3 rebounds during the 2025–26 season, playing in 64 games and starting 37. During the 2026 NBA playoffs, he shot 69.2% on three-pointers, the best in the NBA. Following his breakout season, Jones entered restricted free agency, where the Oklahoma City Thunder signed him to a two-year, $12 million offer sheet on July 25. The next day, the Nuggets matched the offer sheet, returning Jones to the team but sending them into the second apron.

== Career statistics ==
Legend
| GP | Games played | GS | Games started | MPG | Minutes per game |
| FG% | Field goal percentage | 3P% | 3-point field goal percentage | FT% | Free throw percentage |
| RPG | Rebounds per game | APG | Assists per game | SPG | Steals per game |
| BPG | Blocks per game | PPG | Points per game | **Bold** | Career high |
| * | Led the league |

=== NBA ===
==== Regular season ====
| Year | Team | GP | GS | MPG | FG% | 3P% | FT% | RPG | APG | SPG | BPG | PPG |
|---|---|---|---|---|---|---|---|---|---|---|---|---|
| 2024–25 | Denver | 20 | 0 | 6.3 | .324 | .059 | **1.000** | .9 | .3 | .3 | .3 | 1.3 |
| 2025–26 | Denver | **64** | **37** | **22.1** | **.504** | **.396** | .608 | **3.3** | **.8** | **.8** | **.5** | **5.5** |
| Career | | 84 | 37 | 18.4 | .483 | .360 | .630 | 2.7 | .7 | .7 | .4 | 4.5 |

==== Playoffs ====
| Year | Team | GP | GS | MPG | FG% | 3P% | FT% | RPG | APG | SPG | BPG | PPG |
|---|---|---|---|---|---|---|---|---|---|---|---|---|
| 2026 | Denver | 6 | 3 | 24.2 | .684 | .692* | .800 | 2.0 | .3 | .7 | 1.2 | 6.5 |
| Career | | 6 | 3 | 24.2 | .684 | .692 | .800 | 2.0 | .3 | .7 | 1.2 | 6.5 |
