= 2023–24 Denver Nuggets season =

NBA professional basketball team season

- Head coach: Michael Malone
- President: Josh Kroenke
- General manager: Calvin Booth
- Owners: Ann Walton Kroenke
- Arena: Ball Arena

Results
- Record: 57–25 (.695)
- Place: Division: 2nd (Northwest); Conference: 2nd (Western)
- Playoff finish: Conference semifinals (lost to Timberwolves 3–4)
- Stats at Basketball Reference

Local media
- Television: Altitude Sports and Entertainment
- Radio: KKSE

The 2023–24 Denver Nuggets season was the 48th season for the franchise in the National Basketball Association (NBA). The Nuggets entered the season as the defending NBA, Western Conference, and Northwest Division champions after winning the 2023 NBA Finals against the Miami Heat during the previous season in five games for their first championship. The Nuggets managed to clinch their 6th straight playoff berth on March 31, 2024, after they defeated the Cleveland Cavaliers. They finished the regular season with a 57–25 record, placing them second in the Western Conference after losing the tiebreaker to the Oklahoma City Thunder, who had the same record, due to a 1–3 season series loss. On May 8, 2024, center Nikola Jokić won his third MVP award in four seasons.

The Nuggets defeated the Los Angeles Lakers in five games in the first round of the playoffs, a rematch of last season's Western Conference Finals in which Denver swept Los Angeles. In the Semifinals, the Nuggets and the Minnesota Timberwolves exchanged blowouts in a seven-game series, but the Nuggets would blow a 20-point lead in Game 7 as they were eliminated by the Timberwolves 98-90 despite having Jamal Murray and Nikola Jokić scoring a combined 69 points. The Nuggets became the first team in NBA history to lose a Game 7 after leading by 15 or more points at halftime.

== Draft ==
Round	Pick	Player	Position(s)	Nationality	College / Club
2	40	Maxwell Lewis	SF	United States	Pepperdine (So.)

The Nuggets entered the draft with one second-round pick, which is originally owned by the Dallas Mavericks and acquired through a 2022 trade with the Oklahoma City Thunder. They had traded their first-round pick to Oklahoma City (eventually conveyed to the Charlotte Hornets when it fell outside of its lottery protection due to Denver qualifying for the 2023 NBA playoffs) and their original second-round pick to the Cleveland Cavaliers (which ultimately ended up with the Chicago Bulls, who forfeited it due to free agency tampering violations).

== Roster ==
2023–24 Denver Nuggets roster
Players

Pos.	No.	Player	Height	Weight	DOB	From
G	0	Christian Braun	6 ft 6 in (1.98 m)	220 lb (100 kg)	2001-04-17	Kansas
G	5	Kentavious Caldwell-Pope	6 ft 5 in (1.96 m)	204 lb (93 kg)	1993-02-18	Georgia
F	31	Vlatko Čančar (injured)	6 ft 8 in (2.03 m)	236 lb (107 kg)	1997-04-10	Slovenia
G	21	Collin Gillespie (injured) (TW)	6 ft 1 in (1.85 m)	195 lb (88 kg)	1999-06-25	Villanova
F	50	Aaron Gordon	6 ft 8 in (2.03 m)	235 lb (107 kg)	1995-09-16	Arizona
G/F	9	Justin Holiday	6 ft 6 in (1.98 m)	180 lb (82 kg)	1989-04-05	Washington
C	30	Jay Huff (TW)	7 ft 1 in (2.16 m)	240 lb (109 kg)	1997-08-25	Virginia
G	7	Reggie Jackson	6 ft 2 in (1.88 m)	208 lb (94 kg)	1990-04-16	Boston College
C	15	Nikola Jokić	6 ft 11 in (2.11 m)	284 lb (129 kg)	1995-02-19	Serbia
C	6	DeAndre Jordan	6 ft 11 in (2.11 m)	265 lb (120 kg)	1988-07-21	Texas A&M
F	11	Braxton Key (TW)	6 ft 8 in (2.03 m)	225 lb (102 kg)	1997-02-14	Virginia
G	27	Jamal Murray	6 ft 4 in (1.93 m)	215 lb (98 kg)	1997-02-23	Kentucky
F/C	22	Zeke Nnaji	6 ft 9 in (2.06 m)	240 lb (109 kg)	2001-01-09	Arizona
G	24	Jalen Pickett	6 ft 2 in (1.88 m)	202 lb (92 kg)	1999-10-22	Penn State
F	1	Michael Porter Jr.	6 ft 10 in (2.08 m)	218 lb (99 kg)	1998-06-29	Missouri
G/F	3	Julian Strawther	6 ft 6 in (1.98 m)	205 lb (93 kg)	2002-04-18	Gonzaga
F	4	Hunter Tyson	6 ft 8 in (2.03 m)	215 lb (98 kg)	2000-06-13	Clemson
G/F	8	Peyton Watson	6 ft 7 in (2.01 m)	200 lb (91 kg)	2002-09-11	UCLA

Coaches
Head coach
- Michael Malone
Assistant(s)
- David Adelman
- John Beckett
- Ryan Bowen
- Popeye Jones
- Charles Klask
- Ryan Saunders
- Ognjen Stojaković
- Elvis Valcarcel

Legend
- (DP) Unsigned draft pick
- (FA) Free agent
- (S) Suspended
- (GL) On assignment to G League
- (TW) Two-way affiliate player
- Injured

Roster
Updated: March 17, 2024

== Standings ==
=== Division ===
Northwest Division	W	L	PCT	GB	Home	Road	Div	GP
c – Oklahoma City Thunder	57	25	.695	–	33‍–‍8	24‍–‍17	12‍–‍4	82
x – Denver Nuggets	57	25	.695	–	33‍–‍8	24‍–‍17	10‍–‍6	82
x – Minnesota Timberwolves	56	26	.683	1.0	30‍–‍11	26‍–‍15	12‍–‍4	82
Utah Jazz	31	51	.378	26.0	21‍–‍20	10‍–‍31	5‍–‍11	82
Portland Trail Blazers	21	61	.256	36.0	11‍–‍30	10‍–‍31	1‍–‍15	82

=== Conference ===
Western Conference
#	Team	W	L	PCT	GB	GP
1	c – Oklahoma City Thunder *	57	25	.695	–	82
2	x – Denver Nuggets	57	25	.695	–	82
3	x – Minnesota Timberwolves	56	26	.683	1.0	82
4	y – Los Angeles Clippers *	51	31	.622	6.0	82
5	y – Dallas Mavericks *	50	32	.610	7.0	82
6	x – Phoenix Suns	49	33	.598	8.0	82
7	x – New Orleans Pelicans	49	33	.598	8.0	82
8	x – Los Angeles Lakers	47	35	.573	10.0	82
9	pi – Sacramento Kings	46	36	.561	11.0	82
10	pi – Golden State Warriors	46	36	.561	11.0	82
11	Houston Rockets	41	41	.500	16.0	82
12	Utah Jazz	31	51	.378	26.0	82
13	Memphis Grizzlies	27	55	.329	30.0	82
14	San Antonio Spurs	22	60	.268	35.0	82
15	Portland Trail Blazers	21	61	.256	36.0	82

== Game log ==
=== Preseason ===
2023 preseason game log
Total: 3–2 (Home: 1–0; Road: 2–2)
Preseason: 3–2 (home: 1–0; road: 2–2)

Game	Date	Team	Score	High points	High rebounds	High assists	Location Attendance	Record
1	October 10	@ Phoenix	W 115–107	Julian Strawther (20)	Aaron Gordon (7)	Jamal Murray (5)	Footprint Center; 17,071	1–0
2	October 12	@ Chicago	L 124–133 (2OT)	Nikola Jokić (17)	Huff, Jokić (6)	Jamal Murray (5)	United Center; 19,975	1–1
3	October 15	Chicago	W 116–102	Julian Strawther (23)	Nikola Jokić (9)	Jokić, Murray (5)	Ball Arena; 17,286	2–1
4	October 17	@ L.A. Clippers	L 103–116	Hunter Tyson (19)	Braxton Key (10)	DeAndre Jordan (4)	Crypto.com Arena; 16,182	2–2
5	October 19	@ L.A. Clippers	W 103–90	Nikola Jokić (25)	Nikola Jokić (14)	Nikola Jokić (8)	Crypto.com Arena; 15,007	3–2

2023–24 preseason schedule

=== Regular season ===
2023–24 game log
Total: 57–25 (Home: 33–8; Road: 24–17)
October: 4–0 (home: 2–0; road: 2–0)

Game	Date	Team	Score	High points	High rebounds	High assists	Location Attendance	Record
1	October 24	L.A. Lakers	W 119–107	Nikola Jokić (29)	Nikola Jokić (13)	Nikola Jokić (11)	Ball Arena; 19,842	1–0
2	October 27	@ Memphis	W 108–104	Jokić, Murray (22)	Michael Porter Jr. (13)	Nikola Jokić (7)	FedExForum; 16,617	2–0
3	October 29	@ Oklahoma City	W 128–95	Nikola Jokić (28)	Nikola Jokić (14)	Jamal Murray (8)	Paycom Center; 18,203	3–0
4	October 30	Utah	W 110–102	Nikola Jokić (27)	Nikola Jokić (10)	Jamal Murray (14)	Ball Arena; 19,671	4–0

November: 9–6 (home: 7–0; road: 2–6)

Game	Date	Team	Score	High points	High rebounds	High assists	Location Attendance	Record
5	November 1	@ Minnesota	L 89–110	Nikola Jokić (25)	Nikola Jokić (10)	Jamal Murray (6)	Target Center; 18,024	4–1
6	November 3	Dallas	W 125–114	Nikola Jokić (33)	Nikola Jokić (14)	Jamal Murray (13)	Ball Arena; 19,729	5–1
7	November 4	Chicago	W 123–101	Nikola Jokić (28)	Nikola Jokić (16)	Nikola Jokić (9)	Ball Arena; 19,610	6–1
8	November 6	New Orleans	W 134–116	Nikola Jokić (35)	Nikola Jokić (14)	Nikola Jokić (12)	Ball Arena; 19,544	7–1
9	November 8	Golden State	W 108–105	Nikola Jokić (35)	Nikola Jokić (13)	Reggie Jackson (6)	Ball Arena; 19,737	8–1
10	November 12	@ Houston	L 101–104	Nikola Jokić (36)	Nikola Jokić (21)	Nikola Jokić (11)	Toyota Center; 18,055	8–2
11	November 14	L.A. Clippers	W 111–108	Nikola Jokić (32)	Nikola Jokić (16)	Nikola Jokić (9)	Ball Arena; 19,661	9–2
12	November 17	@ New Orleans	L 110–115	Nikola Jokić (26)	Nikola Jokić (16)	Nikola Jokić (18)	Smoothie King Center; 15,278	9–3
13	November 19	@ Cleveland	L 109–121	Michael Porter Jr. (21)	Nikola Jokić (10)	Nikola Jokić (7)	Rocket Mortgage FieldHouse; 19,432	9–4
14	November 20	@ Detroit	W 107–103	Reggie Jackson (21)	Michael Porter Jr. (11)	Aaron Gordon (7)	Little Caesars Arena; 19,403	10–4
15	November 22	@ Orlando	L 119–124	Nikola Jokić (30)	Nikola Jokić (13)	Nikola Jokić (12)	Amway Center; 18,237	10–5
16	November 24	@ Houston	L 86–105	Nikola Jokić (38)	Nikola Jokić (19)	Nikola Jokić (8)	Toyota Center; 18,055	10–6
17	November 26	San Antonio	W 132–120	Nikola Jokić (39)	Nikola Jokić (11)	Nikola Jokić (9)	Ball Arena; 19,665	11–6
18	November 27	@ L.A. Clippers	W 113–104	Reggie Jackson (35)	DeAndre Jordan (13)	Reggie Jackson (13)	Crypto.com Arena; 17,071	12–6
19	November 29	Houston	W 134–124	Nikola Jokić (32)	Jokić, Porter Jr. (10)	Nikola Jokić (15)	Ball Arena; 19,590	13–6

December: 10–5 (home: 4–3; road: 6–2)

Game	Date	Team	Score	High points	High rebounds	High assists	Location Attendance	Record
20	December 1	@ Phoenix	W 119–111	Nikola Jokić (21)	Michael Porter Jr. (10)	Nikola Jokić (16)	Footprint Center; 17,071	14–6
21	December 2	@ Sacramento	L 117–123	Nikola Jokić (36)	Nikola Jokić (13)	Nikola Jokić (14)	Golden 1 Center; 17,829	14–7
22	December 6	@ L.A. Clippers	L 102–111	Jamal Murray (23)	Nikola Jokić (15)	Nikola Jokić (10)	Crypto.com Arena; 16,365	14–8
23	December 8	Houston	L 106–114	Nikola Jokić (23)	Nikola Jokić (16)	Reggie Jackson (6)	Ball Arena; 19,544	14–9
24	December 11	@ Atlanta	W 129–122	Jamal Murray (29)	Aaron Gordon (12)	Nikola Jokić (9)	State Farm Arena; 17,531	15–9
25	December 12	@ Chicago	W 114–106	Reggie Jackson (25)	DeAndre Jordan (10)	Gordon, Jackson, Jokić (6)	United Center; 20,775	16–9
26	December 14	Brooklyn	W 124–101	Nikola Jokić (26)	Nikola Jokić (15)	Nikola Jokić (10)	Ball Arena; 19,636	17–9
27	December 16	Oklahoma City	L 117–118	Nikola Jokić (24)	Michael Porter Jr. (11)	Nikola Jokić (12)	Ball Arena; 19,611	17–10
28	December 18	Dallas	W 130–104	Jamal Murray (22)	Nikola Jokić (9)	Nikola Jokić (7)	Ball Arena; 19,659	18–10
29	December 20	@ Toronto	W 113–104	Nikola Jokić (31)	Nikola Jokić (15)	Jokić, Murray (6)	Scotiabank Arena; 19,800	19–10
30	December 22	@ Brooklyn	W 122–117	Jamal Murray (32)	Nikola Jokić (11)	Jamal Murray (9)	Barclays Center; 17,732	20–10
31	December 23	@ Charlotte	W 102–95	Michael Porter Jr. (22)	Jamal Murray (12)	Nikola Jokić (9)	Spectrum Center; 19,165	21–10
32	December 25	Golden State	W 120–114	Jamal Murray (28)	Nikola Jokić (14)	Nikola Jokić (8)	Ball Arena; 19,811	22–10
33	December 28	Memphis	W 142–105	Nikola Jokić (26)	Nikola Jokić (14)	Nikola Jokić (10)	Ball Arena; 19,520	23–10
34	December 29	Oklahoma City	L 93–119	Nikola Jokić (19)	Nikola Jokić (10)	Jamal Murray (11)	Ball Arena; 19,808	23–11

January: 10–5 (home: 6–1; road: 4–4)

Game	Date	Team	Score	High points	High rebounds	High assists	Location Attendance	Record
35	January 1	Charlotte	W 111–93	Jamal Murray (25)	Nikola Jokić (11)	Jamal Murray (7)	Ball Arena; 19,625	24–11
36	January 4	@ Golden State	W 130–127	Nikola Jokić (34)	Gordon, Jokić (9)	Nikola Jokić (10)	Chase Center; 18,064	25–11
37	January 5	Orlando	L 120–122	Nikola Jokić (29)	Aaron Gordon (8)	Jamal Murray (9)	Ball Arena; 19,659	25–12
38	January 7	Detroit	W 131–114	Jamal Murray (37)	Jokić, Jordan (7)	Nikola Jokić (16)	Ball Arena; 19,623	26–12
39	January 10	@ Utah	L 111–124	Nikola Jokić (27)	Nikola Jokić (11)	Jokić, Murray (6)	Delta Center; 18,206	26–13
40	January 12	New Orleans	W 125–113	Nikola Jokić (27)	Jokić, Porter Jr. (10)	Nikola Jokić (14)	Ball Arena; 19,638	27–13
41	January 14	Indiana	W 117–109	Jokić, Murray, Porter Jr. (25)	Nikola Jokić (12)	Nikola Jokić (9)	Ball Arena; 19,631	28–13
42	January 16	@ Philadelphia	L 121–126	Nikola Jokić (25)	Nikola Jokić (19)	Jamal Murray (10)	Wells Fargo Center; 19,775	28–14
43	January 19	@ Boston	W 102–100	Jamal Murray (35)	Nikola Jokić (12)	Nikola Jokić (9)	TD Garden; 19,156	29–14
44	January 21	@ Washington	W 113–104	Nikola Jokić (42)	Nikola Jokić (12)	Nikola Jokić (8)	Capital One Arena; 17,107	30–14
45	January 23	@ Indiana	W 114–109	Jokić, Murray (31)	Nikola Jokić (13)	Nikola Jokić (10)	Gainbridge Fieldhouse; 16,004	31–14
46	January 25	@ New York	L 84–122	Nikola Jokić (31)	Nikola Jokić (11)	Jamal Murray (7)	Madison Square Garden; 19,812	31–15
47	January 27	Philadelphia	W 111–105	Nikola Jokić (26)	Nikola Jokić (16)	Jokić, Murray (7)	Ball Arena; 19,805	32–15
48	January 29	Milwaukee	W 113–107	Jamal Murray (35)	Nikola Jokić (16)	Nikola Jokić (12)	Ball Arena; 19,801	33–15
49	January 31	@ Oklahoma City	L 100–105	Gordon, Jackson, Murray (16)	Aaron Gordon (13)	Aaron Gordon (7)	Paycom Center; 16,723	33–16

February: 8–3 (home: 5–1; road: 3–2)

Game	Date	Team	Score	High points	High rebounds	High assists	Location Attendance	Record
50	February 2	Portland	W 120–108	Nikola Jokić (27)	Nikola Jokić (22)	Nikola Jokić (12)	Ball Arena; 19,622	34–16
51	February 4	Portland	W 112–103	Nikola Jokić (29)	Nikola Jokić (8)	Jamal Murray (10)	Ball Arena; 19,715	35–16
52	February 8	@ L.A. Lakers	W 114–106	Jamal Murray (29)	Nikola Jokić (13)	Jamal Murray (11)	Crypto.com Arena; 18,997	36–16
53	February 9	@ Sacramento	L 106–135	Nikola Jokić (23)	Nikola Jokić (8)	Nikola Jokić (7)	Golden 1 Center; 17,832	36–17
54	February 12	@ Milwaukee	L 95–112	Nikola Jokić (29)	Nikola Jokić (12)	Nikola Jokić (8)	Fiserv Forum; 17,444	36–18
55	February 14	Sacramento	L 98–102	Aaron Gordon (25)	Aaron Gordon (15)	Reggie Jackson (9)	Ball Arena; 19,617	36–19
All-Star Game
56	February 22	Washington	W 130–110	Michael Porter Jr. (22)	Nikola Jokić (19)	Nikola Jokić (15)	Ball Arena; 19,621	37–19
57	February 23	@ Portland	W 127–112	Michael Porter Jr. (34)	Nikola Jokić (15)	Nikola Jokić (14)	Moda Center; 18,898	38–19
58	February 25	@ Golden State	W 119–103	Nikola Jokić (32)	Nikola Jokić (16)	Nikola Jokić (16)	Chase Center; 18,064	39–19
59	February 28	Sacramento	W 117–96	Jamal Murray (32)	Nikola Jokić (14)	Nikola Jokić (11)	Ball Arena; 19,628	40–19
60	February 29	Miami	W 103–97	Michael Porter Jr. (30)	Jokić, Porter Jr. (11)	Nikola Jokić (7)	Ball Arena; 19,634	41–19

March: 11–4 (home: 6–3; road: 5–1)

Game	Date	Team	Score	High points	High rebounds	High assists	Location Attendance	Record
61	March 2	@ L.A. Lakers	W 124–114	Nikola Jokić (35)	Jokić, Porter Jr. (10)	Jamal Murray (11)	Crypto.com Arena; 18,997	42–19
62	March 5	Phoenix	L 107–117 (OT)	Jamal Murray (28)	Nikola Jokić (16)	Jamal Murray (9)	Ball Arena; 19,589	42–20
63	March 7	Boston	W 115–109	Nikola Jokić (32)	Nikola Jokić (12)	Nikola Jokić (11)	Ball Arena; 19,855	43–20
64	March 9	Utah	W 142–121	Jamal Murray (37)	Nikola Jokić (6)	Nikola Jokić (8)	Ball Arena; 19,632	44–20
65	March 11	Toronto	W 125–119	Nikola Jokić (35)	Nikola Jokić (17)	Jokić, Murray (12)	Ball Arena; 19,652	45–20
66	March 13	@ Miami	W 100–88	Michael Porter Jr. (25)	Nikola Jokić (14)	Nikola Jokić (6)	Kaseya Center; 19,921	46–20
67	March 15	@ San Antonio	W 117–106	Nikola Jokić (31)	Jamal Murray (11)	Jamal Murray (8)	Moody Center; 16,223	47–20
68	March 17	@ Dallas	L 105–107	Jamal Murray (23)	Nikola Jokić (11)	Jokić, Murray (7)	American Airlines Center; 20,377	47–21
69	March 19	@ Minnesota	W 115–112	Nikola Jokić (35)	Nikola Jokić (16)	Jamal Murray (11)	Target Center; 18,024	48–21
70	March 21	New York	W 113–100	Michael Porter Jr. (31)	Nikola Jokić (14)	Nikola Jokić (11)	Ball Arena; 19,811	49–21
71	March 23	@ Portland	W 114–111	Reggie Jackson (23)	Aaron Gordon (12)	Christian Braun (6)	Moda Center; 18,629	50–21
72	March 25	Memphis	W 128–103	Nikola Jokić (29)	Nikola Jokić (11)	Jackson, Jokić (8)	Ball Arena; 19,536	51–21
73	March 27	Phoenix	L 97–104	Nikola Jokić (22)	Nikola Jokić (9)	Nikola Jokić (10)	Ball Arena; 19,827	51–22
74	March 29	Minnesota	L 98–111	Nikola Jokić (32)	Nikola Jokić (10)	Reggie Jackson (10)	Ball Arena; 19,844	51–23
75	March 31	Cleveland	W 130–101	Nikola Jokić (26)	Nikola Jokić (18)	Nikola Jokić (16)	Ball Arena; 19,621	52–23

April: 5–2 (home: 3–0; road: 2–2)

Game	Date	Team	Score	High points	High rebounds	High assists	Location Attendance	Record
76	April 2	San Antonio	W 110–105	Nikola Jokić (42)	Jokić, Porter Jr. (16)	Christian Braun (7)	Ball Arena; 19,741	53–23
77	April 4	@ L.A. Clippers	L 100–102	Nikola Jokić (36)	Nikola Jokić (17)	Nikola Jokić (10)	Crypto.com Arena; 19,370	53–24
78	April 6	Atlanta	W 142–110	Kentavious Caldwell-Pope (24)	Nikola Jokić (14)	Nikola Jokić (11)	Ball Arena; 19,639	54–24
79	April 9	@ Utah	W 111–95	Jokić, Murray (28)	Nikola Jokić (13)	Nikola Jokić (7)	Delta Center; 18,206	55–24
80	April 10	Minnesota	W 116–107	Nikola Jokić (41)	Nikola Jokić (11)	Aaron Gordon (9)	Ball Arena; 19,845	56–24
81	April 12	@ San Antonio	L 120–121	Jamal Murray (35)	Jokić, Watson (7)	Nikola Jokić (12)	Frost Bank Center; 18,665	56–25
82	April 14	@ Memphis	W 126–111	Jamal Murray (21)	Nikola Jokić (15)	Jokić, Gordon, Braun (5)	FedExForum; 17,544	57–25

2023–24 season schedule

=== Playoffs ===
2024 playoff game log
Total: 7–5 (home: 4–3; road: 3–2)
First Round: 4–1 (home: 3–0; road: 1–1)

Game	Date	Team	Score	High points	High rebounds	High assists	Location Attendance	Series
1	April 20	L.A. Lakers	W 114–103	Nikola Jokić (32)	Nikola Jokić (12)	Jamal Murray (10)	Ball Arena; 19,731	1–0
2	April 22	L.A. Lakers	W 101–99	Nikola Jokić (27)	Nikola Jokić (20)	Nikola Jokić (10)	Ball Arena; 19,711	2–0
3	April 25	@ L.A. Lakers	W 112–105	Aaron Gordon (29)	Gordon, Jokić (15)	Jokić, Murray (9)	Crypto.com Arena; 18,997	3–0
4	April 27	@ L.A. Lakers	L 108–119	Nikola Jokić (33)	Nikola Jokić (14)	Nikola Jokić (14)	Crypto.com Arena; 18,997	3–1
5	April 29	L.A. Lakers	W 108–106	Jamal Murray (32)	Nikola Jokić (20)	Nikola Jokić (9)	Ball Arena; 19,861	4–1

Conference Semifinals: 3–4 (home: 1–3; road: 2–1)

Game	Date	Team	Score	High points	High rebounds	High assists	Location Attendance	Series
1	May 4	Minnesota	L 99–106	Nikola Jokić (32)	Nikola Jokić (8)	Nikola Jokić (9)	Ball Arena; 19,915	0–1
2	May 6	Minnesota	L 80–106	Aaron Gordon (20)	Nikola Jokić (16)	Nikola Jokić (8)	Ball Arena; 19,942	0–2
3	May 10	@ Minnesota	W 117–90	Jokić, Murray (24)	Nikola Jokić (14)	Nikola Jokić (9)	Target Center; 19,733	1–2
4	May 12	@ Minnesota	W 115–107	Nikola Jokić (35)	Gordon, Jokić (7)	Jamal Murray (8)	Target Center; 19,583	2–2
5	May 14	Minnesota	W 112–97	Nikola Jokić (40)	Aaron Gordon (10)	Nikola Jokić (13)	Ball Arena; 19,992	3–2
6	May 16	@ Minnesota	L 70–115	Nikola Jokić (22)	Nikola Jokić (9)	Jamal Murray (5)	Target Center; 19,187	3–3
7	May 19	Minnesota	L 90–98	Jamal Murray (35)	Nikola Jokić (19)	Nikola Jokić (7)	Ball Arena; 20,022	3–4

2024 playoff schedule

=== In-Season Tournament ===
This was the first regular season where all the NBA teams competed in a mid-season tournament setting due to the implementation of the 2023 NBA In-Season Tournament. During the in-season tournament period, the Nuggets competed in Group B of the Western Conference, which included the Los Angeles Clippers, the New Orleans Pelicans, the Dallas Mavericks, and the Houston Rockets.

==== West group B ====
Pos	Team	Pld	W	L	PF	PA	PD	Qualification	NOP	HOU	DAL	DEN	LAC
1	New Orleans Pelicans	4	3	1	463	430	+33	Advance to knockout stage	—	101–104	131–110	115–110	116–106
2	Houston Rockets	4	2 (Note: Tied on head-to-head results. Overall point difference is used as the tiebreaker.)	2	424	414	+10		104–101	—	115–121	105–86	100–106
3	Dallas Mavericks	4	2	2	489	497	−8		110–131	121–115	—	114–125	144–126
4	Denver Nuggets	4	2	2	432	442	−10		110–115	86–105	125–114	—	111–108
5	Los Angeles Clippers	4	1	3	446	471	−25		106–116	106–100	126–144	108–111	—

Source: NBA
Rules for classification: Tiebreakers

== Player statistics ==
Legend
GP	Games played	GS	Games started	MPG	Minutes per game
FG%	Field-goal percentage	3P%	3-point field-goal percentage	FT%	Free-throw percentage
RPG	Rebounds per game	APG	Assists per game	SPG	Steals per game
BPG	Blocks per game	PPG	Points per game

=== Regular season ===
Denver Nuggets statistics
Player	GP	GS	MPG	FG%	3P%	FT%	RPG	APG	SPG	BPG	PPG
Christian Braun	82	4	20.2	.460	.384	.694	3.7	1.6	.5	.4	7.3
Kentavious Caldwell-Pope	76	76	31.6	.460	.406	.894	2.4	2.4	1.3	.6	10.1
Collin Gillespie	24	0	9.4	.464	.395	.667	.9	1.1	.5	.0	3.6
Aaron Gordon	73	73	31.5	.556	.290	.658	6.5	3.5	.8	.6	13.9
Justin Holiday	58	9	14.9	.454	.404	.750	1.2	1.2	.6	.2	4.0
Jay Huff	20	0	2.5	.600	.333	1.000	.6	.1	.1	.2	1.2
Reggie Jackson	82	23	22.2	.431	.359	.806	1.9	3.8	.5	.2	10.2
Nikola Jokić	79	79	34.6	.583	.359	.817	12.4	9.0	1.4	.9	26.4
DeAndre Jordan	36	2	11.0	.624		.491	4.4	.7	.2	.4	3.9
Braxton Key	20	0	3.0	.412	.400	.750	.9	.5	.1	.1	1.1
Jamal Murray	59	59	31.5	.481	.425	.853	4.1	6.5	1.0	.7	21.2
Zeke Nnaji	58	0	9.9	.463	.261	.677	2.2	.6	.3	.7	3.2
Jalen Pickett	27	0	4.5	.429	.360	.750	.5	.8	.1	.0	1.6
Michael Porter Jr.	81	81	31.7	.484	.397	.836	7.0	1.5	.5	.7	16.7
Julian Strawther	50	0	10.9	.369	.297	.710	1.2	.9	.3	.1	4.5
Hunter Tyson	18	0	2.7	.400	.286		.5	.1	.1	.0	1.1
Peyton Watson	80	4	18.6	.465	.296	.670	3.2	1.1	.5	1.1	6.7

=== Playoffs ===
Denver Nuggets statistics
Player	GP	GS	MPG	FG%	3P%	FT%	RPG	APG	SPG	BPG	PPG
Christian Braun	12	0	17.0	.426	.222	.688	2.7	.8	.2	.4	5.1
Kentavious Caldwell-Pope	12	12	35.0	.395	.327	1.000	2.9	2.6	1.4	.4	8.1
Aaron Gordon	12	12	37.1	.585	.407	.821	7.3	4.4	.8	.6	14.3
Justin Holiday	12	0	12.5	.314	.379	.500	1.7	.3	.5	.0	2.9
Reggie Jackson	12	0	9.8	.333	.348	1.000	1.3	1.0	.2	.1	3.5
Nikola Jokić	12	12	40.2	.545	.264	.901	13.4	8.7	1.4	.7	28.7
DeAndre Jordan	2	0	6.5	.500		1.000	1.5	.0	.5	.5	2.0
Jamal Murray	12	12	38.5	.402	.315	.923	4.3	5.6	.8	.5	20.6
Zeke Nnaji	3	0	4.7	.667		.500	.7	.0	.0	.3	1.7
Jalen Pickett	3	0	3.7	.667	.000		.3	.3	.0	.3	1.3
Michael Porter Jr.	12	12	36.9	.466	.407	.769	6.8	1.1	.9	.8	15.8
Julian Strawther	3	0	5.3	.333	.250	.500	.7	.0	.3	.0	2.3
Hunter Tyson	3	0	4.7	.000	.000	.500	1.0	.3	.0	.0	.3
Peyton Watson	10	0	9.0	.250	.250	.500	1.5	.4	.0	.6	1.8

== Transactions ==
=== Trades ===
June 23, 2023	To Denver Nuggets Draft rights to Julian Strawther (No. 29) (from Indiana); Draft rights to Jalen Pickett (No. 32) (from Indiana); Draft rights to Hunter Tyson (No. 37) (from Oklahoma City); 2024 second-round pick (from Oklahoma City)	To Indiana Pacers Draft rights to Mojave King (No. 47) (from Los Angeles); 2024 first-round pick (from Oklahoma City)
June 23, 2023	To Los Angeles Lakers Draft rights to Maxwell Lewis (No. 40) (from Denver)	To Oklahoma City Thunder 2029 first-round pick (from Denver)

=== Free agency ===
==== Re-signed ====
Date	Player	Signed	Ref.
July 16	Reggie Jackson	2-year contract	
July 21	DeAndre Jordan	1-year contract	

==== Additions ====
Date	Player	Former team	Ref.
July 6	Justin Holiday	Dallas Mavericks	

==== Subtractions ====
Date	Player	Reason left	New team	Ref.
July 2	Thomas Bryant	Free agent	Miami Heat	
July 6	Bruce Brown	Free agent	Indiana Pacers	
July 7	Jeff Green	Free agent	Houston Rockets	
July 20	Jack White	Free agent	Oklahoma City Thunder	
