= 2025–26 Denver Nuggets season =

- Head coach: David Adelman
- President: Josh Kroenke
- General manager: Ben Tenzer
- Owners: Ann Walton Kroenke
- Arena: Ball Arena

Results
- Record: 54–28 (.659)
- Place: Division: 2nd (Northwest); Conference: 3rd (Western)
- Playoff finish: First round (lost to Timberwolves 2–4)
- Stats at Basketball Reference

Local media
- Television: Altitude Sports and Entertainment
- Radio: KKSE

The 2025–26 Denver Nuggets season was the 50th season for the franchise in the National Basketball Association (NBA). The season marked the first since the 2014–15 season without Michael Malone as head coach, following his dismissal on April 8, 2025. On May 22, the Nuggets hired David Adelman as their full-time head coach. The season also marks the first with Ben Tenzer serving as executive vice president of basketball operations and Jon Wallace as executive vice president of player personnel, jointly succeeding Calvin Booth, who was relieved of his duties as general manager on April 8, 2025.

On Christmas Day, center Nikola Jokić became the first player in league history to have a 55–15–15 game in an overtime win over the Minnesota Timberwolves. However, he suffered a left knee injury only four days later and missed the next four weeks.

On March 27 against the Utah Jazz, Jamal Murray broke the franchise single season three point shots record, surpassing Michael Porter Jr., shooting a high volume at a high percentage.

On March 31, the Nuggets clinched the playoffs for the eighth consecutive season following a win by the Orlando Magic over the Phoenix Suns. On April 6, they surpassed their win total from the previous season following a win over the Portland Trail Blazers. They closed the regular season with a 54–28 record and 12 straight wins, tying the second-longest regular season winning streak in franchise history. As the third seed, they faced the sixth-seeded Minnesota Timberwolves in the first round, marking their third playoff meeting in the last four seasons. By winning Game 1, they extended their winning streak to 13, securing sole possession of the second-longest streak in franchise history including playoffs. However, their season ended in bitter disappointment as they were upset by the Timberwolves in six games.

== Draft ==
The Nuggets entered the 2025 NBA draft without holding any selections, as they had traded their original first- and second-round picks to the Orlando Magic (as it landed outside its top-5 protection when the Nuggets made the 2025 NBA playoffs) and the Minnesota Timberwolves (eventually landed with the Phoenix Suns), respectively. This made them the only team to begin the draft without a pick. However, by the conclusion of the draft, they were joined by the Houston Rockets, whose pending trades—most notably the trade to acquire Kevin Durant from the Phoenix Suns—were expected to become official by July 6.

== Roster ==
2025–26 Denver Nuggets roster
Players

Pos.	No.	Player	Height	Weight	DOB	From
G	0	Christian Braun	6 ft 6 in (1.98 m)	220 lb (100 kg)	2001-04-17	Kansas
G/F	11	Bruce Brown	6 ft 4 in (1.93 m)	202 lb (92 kg)	1996-08-15	Miami (FL)
F	32	Aaron Gordon	6 ft 8 in (2.03 m)	235 lb (107 kg)	1995-09-16	Arizona
G/F	10	Tim Hardaway Jr.	6 ft 5 in (1.96 m)	205 lb (93 kg)	1992-03-16	Michigan
F	14	DaRon Holmes II	6 ft 9 in (2.06 m)	225 lb (102 kg)	2002-09-15	Dayton
F	23	Cameron Johnson	6 ft 8 in (2.03 m)	210 lb (95 kg)	1996-03-03	North Carolina
C	15	Nikola Jokić	6 ft 11 in (2.11 m)	284 lb (129 kg)	1995-02-19	Serbia
G	1	Curtis Jones (TW)	6 ft 3 in (1.91 m)	195 lb (88 kg)	2001-10-04	Iowa State
F	21	Spencer Jones	6 ft 7 in (2.01 m)	225 lb (102 kg)	2001-06-14	Stanford
G	5	Tyus Jones	6 ft 0 in (1.83 m)	195 lb (88 kg)	1996-05-10	Duke
G	27	Jamal Murray	6 ft 4 in (1.93 m)	215 lb (98 kg)	1997-02-23	Kentucky
F/C	22	Zeke Nnaji	6 ft 10 in (2.08 m)	240 lb (109 kg)	2001-01-09	Arizona
G	24	Jalen Pickett	6 ft 2 in (1.88 m)	202 lb (92 kg)	1999-10-22	Penn State
F	45	David Roddy (TW)	6 ft 4 in (1.93 m)	255 lb (116 kg)	2001-03-27	Colorado State
G	25	KJ Simpson (TW)	6 ft 2 in (1.88 m)	189 lb (86 kg)	2002-08-08	Colorado
G	3	Julian Strawther	6 ft 6 in (1.98 m)	205 lb (93 kg)	2002-04-18	Gonzaga
C	17	Jonas Valančiūnas	6 ft 11 in (2.11 m)	265 lb (120 kg)	1992-05-06	Lithuania
G	8	Peyton Watson (injured)	6 ft 8 in (2.03 m)	200 lb (91 kg)	2002-09-11	UCLA

Coaches
Head coach
- David Adelman
Assistant(s)
- J. J. Barea
- John Beckett
- Rodney Billups
- Ryan Bowen
- Chase Buford
- Jared Dudley
- Mike Moser
- Ognjen Stojaković
- Elvis Valcarcel

Legend
- (DP) Unsigned draft pick
- (FA) Free agent
- (S) Suspended
- (GL) On assignment to G League
- (TW) Two-way affiliate player
- Injured

Roster
Updated: March 4, 2026

== Standings ==
=== Division ===
Northwest Division	W	L	PCT	GB	Home	Road	Div	GP
z – Oklahoma City Thunder	64	18	.780	–	34‍–‍8	30‍–‍10	12‍–‍4	82
x – Denver Nuggets	54	28	.659	10.0	28‍–‍13	26‍–‍15	11‍–‍5	82
x – Minnesota Timberwolves	49	33	.598	15.0	26‍–‍15	23‍–‍18	9‍–‍7	82
x – Portland Trail Blazers	42	40	.512	22.0	24‍–‍17	18‍–‍23	7‍–‍9	82
Utah Jazz	22	60	.268	42.0	14‍–‍27	8‍–‍33	1‍–‍15	82

=== Conference ===
Western Conference
#	Team	W	L	PCT	GB	GP
1	z – Oklahoma City Thunder *	64	18	.780	–	82
2	y – San Antonio Spurs *	62	20	.756	2.0	82
3	x – Denver Nuggets	54	28	.659	10.0	82
4	y – Los Angeles Lakers *	53	29	.646	11.0	82
5	x – Houston Rockets	52	30	.634	12.0	82
6	x – Minnesota Timberwolves	49	33	.598	15.0	82
7	x – Phoenix Suns	45	37	.549	19.0	82
8	x – Portland Trail Blazers	42	40	.512	22.0	82
9	pi – Los Angeles Clippers	42	40	.512	22.0	82
10	pi – Golden State Warriors	37	45	.451	27.0	82
11	New Orleans Pelicans	26	56	.317	38.0	82
12	Dallas Mavericks	26	56	.317	38.0	82
13	Memphis Grizzlies	25	57	.305	39.0	82
14	Sacramento Kings	22	60	.268	42.0	82
15	Utah Jazz	22	60	.268	42.0	82

== Game log ==
=== Preseason ===
2025 preseason game log
Total: 3–2 (Home: 1–1; Road: 2–1)
Preseason: 3–2 (home: 1–1; road: 2–1)

Game	Date	Team	Score	High points	High rebounds	High assists	Location Attendance	Record
1	October 4	Minnesota	L 116–126	Gordon, Jokić (14)	Nikola Jokić (5)	Jamal Murray (5)	Pechanga Arena; 12,096	0–1
2	October 6	@ Toronto	W 112–108	Christian Braun (19)	Peyton Watson (7)	Nikola Jokić (5)	(Canada) Rogers Arena; 18,654	1–1
3	October 12	@ L.A. Clippers	W 102–94	Aaron Gordon (18)	Nikola Jokić (9)	Jokić, Valančiūnas (6)	Intuit Dome; 13,951	2–1
4	October 14	Chicago	W 124–117	Jamal Murray (30)	Nikola Jokić (8)	Nikola Jokić (8)	Ball Arena; 16,567	3–1
5	October 17	@ Oklahoma City	L 91–94	Peyton Watson (15)	Johnson, Watson (6)	Johnson, Pickett, Watson (4)	Paycom Center; 0	3–2

2025–26 preseason schedule

=== Regular season ===
2025–26 game log
Total: 54–28 (Home: 28–13; Road: 26–15)
October: 3–2 (home: 2–0; road: 1–2)

Game	Date	Team	Score	High points	High rebounds	High assists	Location Attendance	Record
1	October 23	@ Golden State	L 131–137 (OT)	Aaron Gordon (50)	Nikola Jokić (13)	Jokić, Murray (10)	Chase Center; 18,064	0–1
2	October 25	Phoenix	W 133–111	Jamal Murray (23)	Nikola Jokić (14)	Nikola Jokić (15)	Ball Arena; 20,025	1–1
3	October 27	@ Minnesota	W 127–114	Jamal Murray (43)	Nikola Jokić (19)	Nikola Jokić (10)	Target Center; 14,018	2–1
4	October 29	New Orleans	W 122–88	Nikola Jokić (21)	Nikola Jokić (12)	Nikola Jokić (10)	Ball Arena; 19,533	3–1
5	October 31	@ Portland	L 107–109	Jamal Murray (22)	Nikola Jokić (14)	Nikola Jokić (9)	Moda Center; 16,382	3–2

November: 11–3 (home: 4–3; road: 7–0)

Game	Date	Team	Score	High points	High rebounds	High assists	Location Attendance	Record
6	November 3	Sacramento	W 130–124	Nikola Jokić (34)	Gordon, Jokić, Murray (7)	Nikola Jokić (14)	Ball Arena; 19,653	4–2
7	November 5	Miami	W 122–112	Nikola Jokić (33)	Nikola Jokić (15)	Nikola Jokić (16)	Ball Arena; 19,862	5–2
8	November 7	Golden State	W 129–104	Nikola Jokić (26)	Nikola Jokić (9)	Nikola Jokić (9)	Ball Arena; 19,969	6–2
9	November 8	Indiana	W 117–100	Nikola Jokić (32)	Nikola Jokić (14)	Nikola Jokić (14)	Ball Arena; 19,954	7–2
10	November 11	@ Sacramento	W 122–108	Nikola Jokić (35)	Nikola Jokić (15)	Jamal Murray (8)	Golden 1 Center; 15,106	8–2
11	November 12	@ L.A. Clippers	W 130–116	Nikola Jokić (55)	Nikola Jokić (12)	Nikola Jokić (6)	Intuit Dome; 17,927	9–2
12	November 15	@ Minnesota	W 123–112	Nikola Jokić (27)	Nikola Jokić (12)	Jamal Murray (12)	Target Center; 18,978	10–2
13	November 17	Chicago	L 127–130	Nikola Jokić (36)	Nikola Jokić (18)	Nikola Jokić (13)	Ball Arena; 19,951	10–3
14	November 19	@ New Orleans	W 125–118	Peyton Watson (32)	Peyton Watson (12)	Nikola Jokić (12)	Smoothie King Center; 16,484	11–3
15	November 21	@ Houston	W 112–109	Nikola Jokić (34)	Jokić, Watson (10)	Jamal Murray (10)	Toyota Center; 18,108	12–3
16	November 22	Sacramento	L 123–128	Nikola Jokić (44)	Nikola Jokić (13)	Jamal Murray (9)	Ball Arena; 19,893	12–4
17	November 24	@ Memphis	W 125–115	Jamal Murray (29)	Nikola Jokić (10)	Nikola Jokić (16)	FedExForum; 15,519	13–4
18	November 28	San Antonio	L 136–139	Jamal Murray (37)	Nikola Jokić (9)	Nikola Jokić (10)	Ball Arena; 19,936	13–5
19	November 29	@ Phoenix	W 130–112	Nikola Jokić (26)	Jokić, Jones (9)	Brown, Jokić (10)	Mortgage Matchup Center; 17,071	14–5

December: 9–5 (home: 4–2; road: 5–3)

Game	Date	Team	Score	High points	High rebounds	High assists	Location Attendance	Record
20	December 1	Dallas	L 121–131	Nikola Jokić (29)	Nikola Jokić (20)	Nikola Jokić (13)	Ball Arena; 19,587	14–6
21	December 3	@ Indiana	W 135–120	Jamal Murray (52)	Nikola Jokić (8)	Nikola Jokić (13)	Gainbridge Fieldhouse; 15,578	15–6
22	December 5	@ Atlanta	W 134–133	Nikola Jokić (40)	Nikola Jokić (9)	Jamal Murray (12)	State Farm Arena; 16,149	16–6
23	December 7	@ Charlotte	W 115–106	Jamal Murray (34)	Nikola Jokić (9)	Nikola Jokić (11)	Spectrum Center; 18,416	17–6
24	December 11	@ Sacramento	W 136–105	Nikola Jokić (36)	Nikola Jokić (12)	Jamal Murray (9)	Golden 1 Center; 16,307	18–6
25	December 15	Houston	W 128–125 (OT)	Nikola Jokić (39)	Nikola Jokić (15)	Nikola Jokić (10)	Ball Arena; 19,596	19–6
26	December 18	Orlando	W 126–115	Jamal Murray (32)	Johnson, Jokić (11)	Nikola Jokić (13)	Ball Arena; 19,731	20–6
27	December 20	Houston	L 101–115	Nikola Jokić (25)	Bruce Brown (12)	Jamal Murray (7)	Ball Arena; 19,955	20–7
28	December 22	Utah	W 135–112	Jamal Murray (27)	Nikola Jokić (13)	Nikola Jokić (13)	Ball Arena; 19,887	21–7
29	December 23	@ Dallas	L 130–131	Jamal Murray (31)	Tied (7)	Jokić, Murray (14)	American Airlines Center; 19,432	21–8
30	December 25	Minnesota	W 142–138 (OT)	Nikola Jokić (56)	Nikola Jokić (16)	Nikola Jokić (15)	Ball Arena; 20,046	22–8
31	December 27	@ Orlando	L 126–127	Nikola Jokić (34)	Nikola Jokić (21)	Nikola Jokić (12)	Kia Center; 19,151	22–9
32	December 29	@ Miami	L 123–147	Nikola Jokić (21)	Jamal Murray (6)	Jamal Murray (11)	Kaseya Center; 20,047	22–10
33	December 31	@ Toronto	W 106–103	Peyton Watson (24)	Jonas Valančiūnas (9)	Jamal Murray (6)	Scotiabank Arena; 19,181	23–10

January: 10–6 (home: 4–4; road: 6–2)

Game	Date	Team	Score	High points	High rebounds	High assists	Location Attendance	Record
34	January 2	@ Cleveland	L 108–113	Jamal Murray (34)	Jones, Murray (6)	Jamal Murray (7)	Rocket Arena; 19,432	23–11
35	January 4	@ Brooklyn	L 115–127	Jamal Murray (27)	Gordon, Murray (6)	Jamal Murray (16)	Barclays Center; 17,548	23–12
36	January 5	@ Philadelphia	W 125–124 (OT)	Jalen Pickett (29)	Zeke Nnaji (8)	Jalen Pickett (7)	Xfinity Mobile Arena; 18,521	24–12
37	January 7	@ Boston	W 114–110	Peyton Watson (30)	Jamal Murray (8)	Jamal Murray (17)	TD Garden; 19,156	25–12
38	January 9	Atlanta	L 87–110	Peyton Watson (25)	Peyton Watson (11)	Jalen Pickett (6)	Ball Arena; 19,650	25–13
39	January 11	Milwaukee	W 108–104	Tim Hardaway Jr. (25)	Zeke Nnaji (10)	Peyton Watson (6)	Ball Arena; 19,645	26–13
40	January 13	@ New Orleans	W 122–116	Jamal Murray (35)	Gordon, Watson (7)	Jamal Murray (9)	Smoothie King Center; 17,309	27–13
41	January 14	@ Dallas	W 118–109	Jamal Murray (33)	Gordon, Pickett (6)	Jamal Murray (5)	American Airlines Center; 18,888	28–13
42	January 17	Washington	W 121–115	Jamal Murray (42)	Aaron Gordon (10)	Aaron Gordon (11)	Ball Arena; 19,968	29–13
43	January 18	Charlotte	L 87–110	Jamal Murray (16)	Spencer Jones (6)	Jalen Pickett (7)	Ball Arena; 19,971	29–14
44	January 20	L.A. Lakers	L 107–115	Jamal Murray (28)	Jalen Pickett (6)	Jamal Murray (11)	Ball Arena; 19,974	29–15
45	January 22	@ Washington	W 107–97	Peyton Watson (35)	Jonas Valančiūnas (9)	Tied (5)	Capital One Arena; 15,040	30–15
46	January 23	@ Milwaukee	W 102–100	Julian Strawther (20)	Zeke Nnaji (12)	Jalen Pickett (7)	Fiserv Forum; 17,341	31–15
—	January 25	@ Memphis	Postponed due to the January 2026 North American winter storm. Makeup date March 18.					
47	January 27	Detroit	L 107–109	Jamal Murray (24)	Jonas Valančiūnas (16)	Jamal Murray (10)	Ball Arena; 19,734	31–16
48	January 29	Brooklyn	W 107–103	Jamal Murray (27)	Jonas Valančiūnas (9)	Jamal Murray (6)	Ball Arena; 19,630	32–16
49	January 30	L.A. Clippers	W 122–109	Nikola Jokić (31)	Nikola Jokić (12)	Jamal Murray (9)	Ball Arena; 20,016	33–16

February: 4–7 (home: 2–2; road: 2–5)

Game	Date	Team	Score	High points	High rebounds	High assists	Location Attendance	Record
50	February 1	Oklahoma City	L 111–121	Peyton Watson (29)	Nikola Jokić (7)	Jamal Murray (12)	Ball Arena; 19,900	33–17
51	February 3	@ Detroit	L 121–124	Jamal Murray (32)	Nikola Jokić (15)	Jamal Murray (8)	Little Caesars Arena; 19,976	33–18
52	February 4	@ New York	L 127–134 (2OT)	Jamal Murray (39)	Nikola Jokić (14)	Nikola Jokić (10)	Madison Square Garden; 19,812	33–19
53	February 7	@ Chicago	W 136–120	Jamal Murray (28)	Nikola Jokić (14)	Nikola Jokić (17)	United Center; 20,939	34–19
54	February 9	Cleveland	L 117–119	Nikola Jokić (22)	Nikola Jokić (14)	Jokić, Murray (11)	Ball Arena; 19,647	34–20
55	February 11	Memphis	W 122–116	Nikola Jokić (26)	Nikola Jokić (15)	Nikola Jokić (11)	Ball Arena; 19,651	35–20
All-Star Game
56	February 19	@ L.A. Clippers	L 114–115	Nikola Jokić (22)	Nikola Jokić (17)	Jamal Murray (8)	Intuit Dome; 17,927	35–21
57	February 20	@ Portland	W 157–103	Nikola Jokić (32)	Spencer Jones (10)	Braun, Jokić (7)	Moda Center; 18,566	36–21
58	February 22	@ Golden State	L 117–128	Nikola Jokić (35)	Nikola Jokić (20)	Nikola Jokić (12)	Chase Center; 18,064	36–22
59	February 25	Boston	W 103–84	Nikola Jokić (30)	Nikola Jokić (12)	Nikola Jokić (6)	Ball Arena; 19,763	37–22
60	February 27	@ Oklahoma City	L 121–127 (OT)	Jamal Murray (39)	Nikola Jokić (17)	Nikola Jokić (14)	Paycom Center; 18,203	37–23

March: 11–5 (home: 8–2; road: 3–3)

Game	Date	Team	Score	High points	High rebounds	High assists	Location Attendance	Record
61	March 1	Minnesota	L 108–117	Nikola Jokić (35)	Nikola Jokić (13)	Nikola Jokić (9)	Ball Arena; 19,895	37–24
62	March 2	@ Utah	W 128–125	Jamal Murray (45)	Nikola Jokić (12)	Jamal Murray (8)	Delta Center; 18,186	38–24
63	March 5	L.A. Lakers	W 120–113	Jokić, Murray (28)	Nikola Jokić (12)	Nikola Jokić (13)	Ball Arena; 19,947	39–24
64	March 6	New York	L 103–142	Nikola Jokić (38)	Nikola Jokić (8)	Tied (5)	Ball Arena; 19,807	39–25
65	March 9	@ Oklahoma City	L 126–129	Nikola Jokić (32)	Nikola Jokić (14)	Nikola Jokić (13)	Paycom Center; 18,203	39–26
66	March 11	Houston	W 129–93	Jamal Murray (30)	Nikola Jokić (12)	Nikola Jokić (13)	Ball Arena; 19,602	40–26
67	March 12	@ San Antonio	W 136–131	Jamal Murray (39)	Nikola Jokić (20)	Nikola Jokić (12)	Frost Bank Center; 19,038	41–26
68	March 14	@ L.A. Lakers	L 125–127 (OT)	Aaron Gordon (27)	Nikola Jokić (16)	Nikola Jokić (14)	Crypto.com Arena; 18,997	41–27
69	March 17	Philadelphia	W 124–96	Christian Braun (22)	Jonas Valančiūnas (9)	Nikola Jokić (14)	Ball Arena; 19,917	42–27
70	March 18	@ Memphis	L 118–125	Nikola Jokić (29)	Nikola Jokić (14)	Jamal Murray (12)	FedExForum; 15,612	42–28
71	March 20	Toronto	W 121–115	Jamal Murray (31)	Nikola Jokić (8)	Nikola Jokić (9)	Ball Arena; 19,924	43–28
72	March 22	Portland	W 128–112	Jokić, Murray (22)	Nikola Jokić (14)	Nikola Jokić (14)	Ball Arena; 19,924	44–28
73	March 24	@ Phoenix	W 125–123	Nikola Jokić (23)	Nikola Jokić (17)	Nikola Jokić (17)	Mortgage Matchup Center; 17,071	45–28
74	March 25	Dallas	W 142–135	Jamal Murray (53)	Nikola Jokić (21)	Nikola Jokić (19)	Ball Arena; 19,837	46–28
75	March 27	Utah	W 135–129	Nikola Jokić (33)	Nikola Jokić (15)	Jamal Murray (14)	Ball Arena; 19,647	47–28
76	March 29	Golden State	W 116–93	Nikola Jokić (25)	Nikola Jokić (15)	Nikola Jokić (8)	Ball Arena; 19,588	48–28

April: 6–0 (home: 4–0; road: 2–0)

Game	Date	Team	Score	High points	High rebounds	High assists	Location Attendance	Record
77	April 1	@ Utah	W 130–117	Jamal Murray (37)	Nikola Jokić (17)	Nikola Jokić (12)	Delta Center	49–28
78	April 4	San Antonio	W 136–134 (OT)	Nikola Jokić (40)	Braun, Jokić (8)	Nikola Jokić (13)	Ball Arena; 20,039	50–28
79	April 6	Portland	W 137–132 (OT)	Nikola Jokić (35)	Nikola Jokić (14)	Nikola Jokić (13)	Ball Arena; 19,615	51–28
80	April 8	Memphis	W 136–119	Jamal Murray (26)	Nikola Jokić (16)	Nikola Jokić (10)	Ball Arena; 19,985	52–28
81	April 10	Oklahoma City	W 127–107	Jonas Valančiūnas (23)	Jonas Valančiūnas (17)	Bruce Brown (6)	Ball Arena; 20,014	53–28
82	April 12	@ San Antonio	W 128–118	Julian Strawther (25)	David Roddy (13)	Jalen Pickett (6)	Frost Bank Center; 19,019	54–28

2025–26 season schedule

=== Playoffs ===
2026 playoff game log
Total: 2–4 (home: 2–1; road: 0–3)
First Round: 2–4 (home: 2–1; road: 0–3)

Game	Date	Team	Score	High points	High rebounds	High assists	Location Attendance	Series
1	April 18	Minnesota	W 116–105	Jamal Murray (30)	Nikola Jokić (13)	Nikola Jokić (11)	Ball Arena; 19,796	1–0
2	April 20	Minnesota	L 114–119	Jamal Murray (30)	Nikola Jokić (15)	Nikola Jokić (8)	Ball Arena; 19,692	1–1
3	April 23	@ Minnesota	L 96–113	Nikola Jokić (27)	Nikola Jokić (15)	Jamal Murray (4)	Target Center; 18,978	1–2
4	April 25	@ Minnesota	L 96–112	Jamal Murray (30)	Nikola Jokić (15)	Nikola Jokić (9)	Target Center; 18,978	1–3
5	April 27	Minnesota	W 125–113	Nikola Jokić (27)	Nikola Jokić (12)	Nikola Jokić (16)	Ball Arena; 19,907	2–3
6	April 30	@ Minnesota	L 98–110	Nikola Jokić (28)	Nikola Jokić (9)	Nikola Jokić (10)	Target Center; 18,978	2–4

2026 playoff schedule

=== NBA Cup ===
The Nuggets will compete in Group C of the Western Conference, which includes the Golden State Warriors, the Houston Rockets, the Portland Trail Blazers and the San Antonio Spurs.

==== West Group C ====
Pos	Team	Pld	W	L	PF	PA	PD	Qualification
1	San Antonio Spurs	4	3	1	483	457	+26	Advanced to knockout rounds
2	Denver Nuggets	4	2	2	484	461	+23	
3	Houston Rockets	4	2	2	463	449	+14	
4	Portland Trail Blazers	4	2	2	454	485	−31	
5	Golden State Warriors	4	1	3	436	468	−32	

Source: NBA

== Player statistics ==
Legend
GP	Games played	GS	Games started	MPG	Minutes per game
FG%	Field-goal percentage	3P%	3-point field-goal percentage	FT%	Free-throw percentage
RPG	Rebounds per game	APG	Assists per game	SPG	Steals per game
BPG	Blocks per game	PPG	Points per game

=== Regular season ===
Denver Nuggets statistics
Player	GP	GS	MPG	FG%	3P%	FT%	RPG	APG	SPG	BPG	PPG
Christian Braun	44	44	31.8	.519	.301	.782	4.8	2.7	.7	.3	12.0
Bruce Brown	82	4	24.4	.475	.385	.762	3.9	2.1	1.0	.2	7.9
Aaron Gordon	36	33	27.9	.497	.389	.767	5.8	2.7	.6	.3	16.2
Tim Hardaway Jr.	80	6	26.6	.447	.407	.811	2.6	1.4	.5	.1	13.5
DaRon Holmes II	25	6	8.4	.508	.444	.786	1.4	.6	.0	.2	3.7
Cameron Johnson	54	54	30.5	.480	.430	.839	3.8	2.4	.7	.4	12.2
Nikola Jokić	65	65	34.8	.569	.380	.831	12.9	10.7	1.4	.8	27.7
Curtis Jones	10	0	8.8	.407	.333	.500	1.1	1.0	.4	.0	2.9
Spencer Jones	64	37	22.1	.504	.396	.608	3.3	.8	.8	.5	5.5
Tyus Jones^{†}	11	2	8.4	.346	.375	.000	1.3	1.2	.1	.0	2.2
Jamal Murray	75	75	35.4	.483	.435	.887	4.4	7.1	.9	.4	25.4
Zeke Nnaji	52	4	12.0	.470	.259	.773	2.6	.6	.3	.5	3.7
Jalen Pickett	50	18	16.1	.422	.386	.789	2.3	2.3	.3	.1	5.2
David Roddy	5	0	14.6	.500	.273	1.000	4.0	.8	.8	.2	8.0
KJ Simpson^{†}	6	0	5.7	.300	.000	.500	1.3	1.3	.2	.0	1.2
Julian Strawther	57	14	15.1	.467	.387	.814	2.0	1.1	.4	.1	7.2
Hunter Tyson	21	2	7.7	.269	.212	.846	1.7	.8	.1	.0	2.2
Jonas Valančiūnas	65	6	13.4	.582	.308	.772	5.1	1.2	.2	.6	8.7
Peyton Watson	54	40	29.6	.491	.411	.730	4.9	2.1	.9	1.1	14.6

- ^{†} Denotes player spent time with another team in the season. Stats reflect time with the Nuggets only.

=== Playoffs ===
Denver Nuggets statistics
Player	GP	GS	MPG	FG%	3P%	FT%	RPG	APG	SPG	BPG	PPG
Christian Braun	6	6	31.2	.417	.429	.737	3.5	1.7	1.0	.8	8.3
Bruce Brown	6	0	19.3	.441	.273	.556	2.7	1.7	1.7	.0	6.3
Aaron Gordon	3	3	29.7	.400	.214	.700	5.3	2.3	.0	.3	11.3
Tim Hardaway Jr.	6	0	23.3	.422	.348	.792	3.3	.8	.7	.3	10.8
DaRon Holmes II	2	0	2.0				1.0	.0	.0	.0	.0
Cameron Johnson	6	6	31.0	.500	.314	.706	3.2	2.3	1.0	.3	14.2
Nikola Jokić	6	6	39.5	.446	.194	.930	13.2	9.5	1.0	.8	25.8
Spencer Jones	6	3	24.2	.684	.692	.800	2.0	.3	.7	1.2	6.5
Tyus Jones	3	0	10.0	.500	.000	.500	.0	1.7	.7	.0	3.0
Jamal Murray	6	6	39.7	.357	.262	.975	5.0	5.7	.8	.3	23.7
Zeke Nnaji	2	0	9.5	1.000	1.000	.833	1.5	.5	.5	.0	5.0
Jalen Pickett	2	0	2.0			.500	.0	.5	.0	.0	.5
Julian Strawther	2	0	9.0	.286	.333	.500	1.5	.0	.0	.0	3.0
Jonas Valančiūnas	4	0	6.3	.714		.500	2.3	.3	.0	.3	2.8

== Transactions ==
=== Trades ===
Date	Trade		Ref.
July 8, 2025	To Brooklyn Nets: Michael Porter Jr.; 2032 first-round pick (from Denver)	To Denver Nuggets: Cameron Johnson	
July 13, 2025	To Sacramento Kings: Dario Šarić	To Denver Nuggets: Jonas Valančiūnas	
February 5, 2026	To Brooklyn Nets: Hunter Tyson; 2032 second-round pick	To Denver Nuggets: 2026 second-round pick (Note: The less favorable of the picks originally belonging to Atlanta and LA Clippers.)	

=== Free agency ===
==== Re-signed ====
Date	Player	Signed	Ref.
July 3, 2025	Spencer Jones	1-year extension	

==== Additions ====
Date	Player	Signed	Former Team	Ref.
July 2, 2025	Tamar Bates	Two-way contract	Missouri	
July 9, 2025	Bruce Brown	1-year, $2.3 million	New Orleans Pelicans	
July 10, 2025	Tim Hardaway Jr.	1-year, $2.3 million	Detroit Pistons	
July 21, 2025	Curtis Jones	Two-way contract	Iowa State	
August 12, 2025	Kessler Edwards	1-year	Dallas Mavericks	

==== Subtractions ====
Date	Player	Reason	New Team	Ref.
July 3, 2025	Trey Alexander	Free agent	New Orleans Pelicans	
July 17, 2025	Vlatko Čančar	Free agent	(Italy) Olimpia Milano	
July 21, 2025	PJ Hall	Released	Memphis Grizzlies	
October 16, 2025	Russell Westbrook	Free agent	Sacramento Kings	
October 24, 2025	DeAndre Jordan	Free agent	New Orleans Pelicans	
