= Peyton Watson =

American basketball player (born 2002)

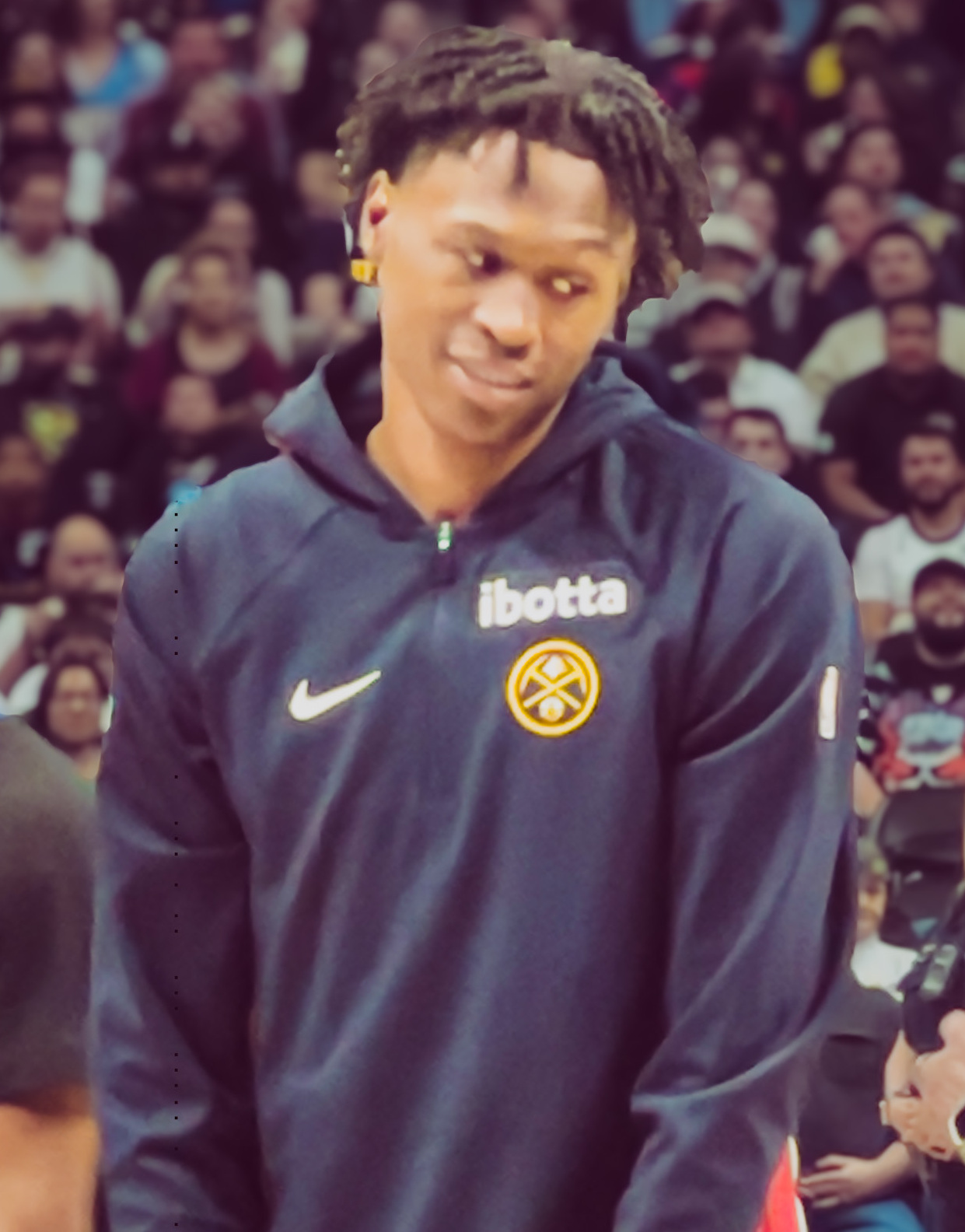
- Watson with the Denver Nuggets in 2025

No. 8 – Cleveland Cavaliers
- Position: Small forward / shooting guard
- League: NBA

Personal information
- Born: September 11, 2002 (age 24) Beverly Hills, California, U.S.
- Listed height: 6 ft 7 in (2.01 m)
- Listed weight: 215 lb (98 kg)

Career information
- High school: Long Beach Poly (Long Beach, California)
- College: UCLA (2021–2022)
- NBA draft: 2022: 1st round, 30th overall pick
- Drafted by: Oklahoma City Thunder
- Playing career: 2022–present

Career history
- 2022–2026: Denver Nuggets
- 2022–2023: →Grand Rapids Gold
- 2026–present: Cleveland Cavaliers

Career highlights
- NBA champion (2023); McDonald's All-American (2021)
- Stats at NBA.com
- Stats at Basketball Reference
Medals
Men's basketball
Representing United States
FIBA Under-19 World Cup
Gold medal – first place	2021 Latvia	Team

Peyton Tyler Watson (born September 11, 2002) is an American professional basketball player for the Cleveland Cavaliers of the National Basketball Association (NBA). A McDonald's All-American in high school, he played one season of college basketball for the UCLA Bruins. Watson was selected in the first round of the 2022 NBA draft with the 30th overall pick.

== High school career ==
Watson attended Long Beach Polytechnic High School in Long Beach, California, joining the varsity team as a freshman. After coming off the bench earlier in his career, he assumed a leading role in his junior season. He averaged 23.2 points and eight rebounds per game, earning Moore League MVP honors. He was named to the rosters for the McDonald's All-American, Jordan Brand Classic and Nike Hoop Summit.

=== Recruiting ===
Watson was a consensus five-star recruit, one of the top small forwards and the highest-ranked player from California in the 2021 recruiting class. On July 27, 2020, he committed to playing college basketball for UCLA over offers from Arizona, Gonzaga, Michigan, Oregon and Washington. He was frank with the Bruins coaching staff that he intended to be a one-and-done player, leaving for the NBA after one year in college.

College recruiting
Name	Hometown	School	Height	Weight	Commit date
Peyton Watson; SF	Long Beach, CA	Long Beach Poly (CA)	6 ft 7 in (2.01 m)	180 lb (82 kg)	Jul 27, 2020
Peyton Watson; SF	Recruit ratings: Rivals: 247Sports: ESPN: (94)				
Overall recruit ranking: Rivals: 12 247Sports: 8 ESPN: 12
Note: In many cases, Scout, Rivals, 247Sports, On3, and ESPN may conflict in their listings of height and weight.; In these cases, the average was taken. ESPN grades are on a 100-point scale.; Sources: "UCLA 2021 Basketball Commitments". Rivals.; "2021 UCLA Bruins Recruiting Class". ESPN.; "2021 Team Ranking". Rivals.

== College career ==
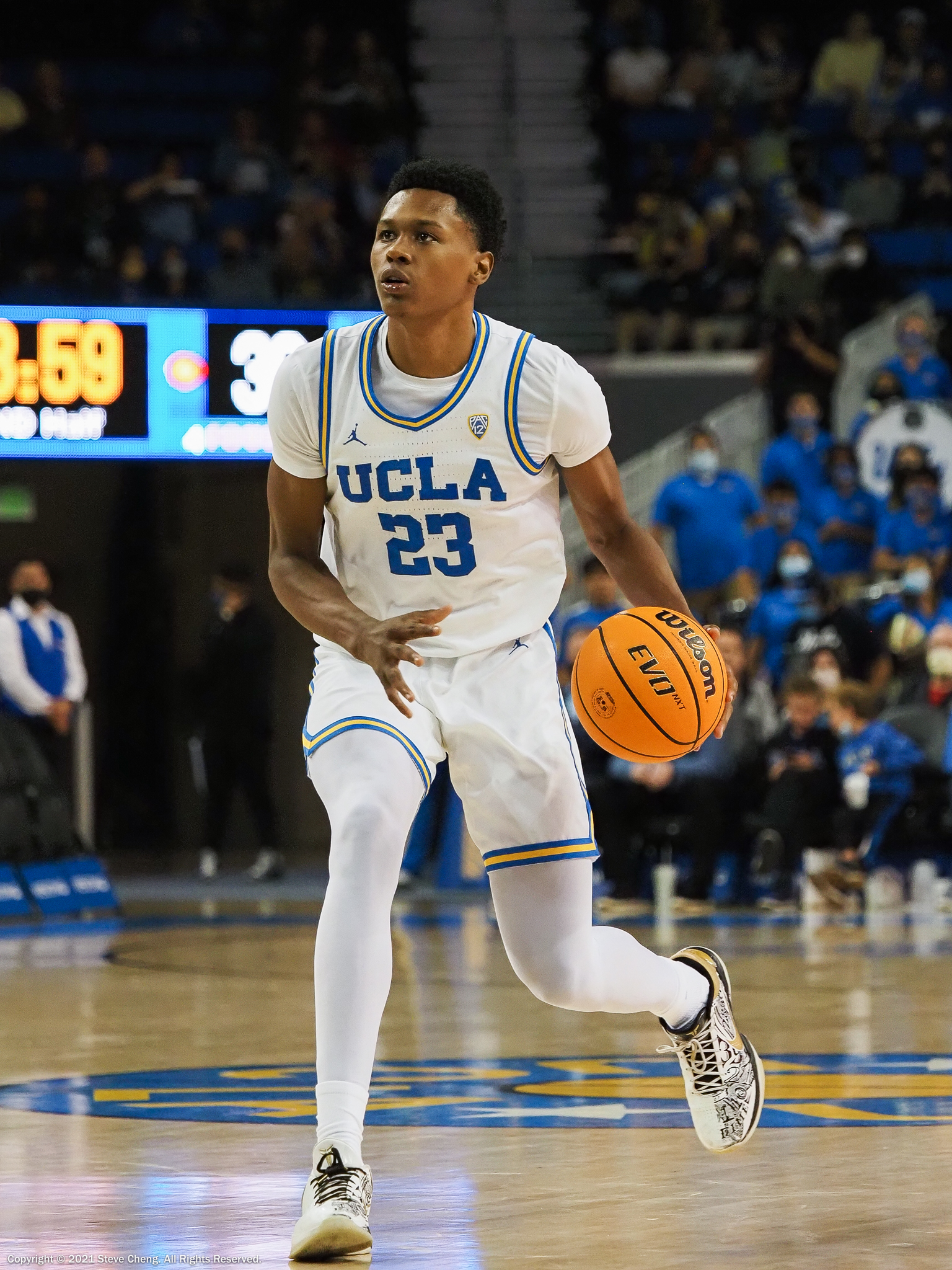
Watson with UCLA in 2021

As a freshman at the University of California, Los Angeles in 2021–22, Watson arrived out of shape, primarily due to his high school senior season being disrupted by the COVID-19 pandemic. He joined an experienced UCLA group that had advanced to the Final Four of the NCAA tournament a year earlier. All five starters returned, and he received no guarantees about his playing time. Watson's defense was more advanced than his offense. However, the Bruins had other established scorers. He received honorable mention for the Pac-12 All-Freshman Team. He averaged 3.3 points and 2.9 rebounds in 12.6 minutes per game, and made just 32.2% of his field goals and 22.6% of his three-pointers. His playing time was sporadic, and he logged 10 minutes or more in just two out of the last seven games of the season. After the season, Watson declared for the NBA draft, forgoing his remaining college eligibility.

== Professional career ==
=== Denver Nuggets (2022–2026) ===
Watson was selected by the Oklahoma City Thunder in first round of the 2022 NBA draft with the 30th overall pick. He was then traded to the Denver Nuggets along with two future second-round picks for JaMychal Green and a 2027 protected first-round draft pick. Possessing a wide wingspan, Watson was projected as a long-term project and expected to spend time developing with the Grand Rapids Gold of the NBA G League. He made 23 appearances (including two starts) for Denver during his rookie campaign, averaging 3.3 points, 1.6 rebounds, and 0.5 assists. Watson ended his rookie season as an NBA champion when the Nuggets defeated the Miami Heat in the NBA Finals.

Watson played in 80 games (including four starts) for Denver in the 2023–24 season, recording averages of 6.7 points, 3.2 rebounds and 1.1 assists. He made 68 appearances (including 18 starts) for Denver during the 2024–25 NBA season, averaging 8.1 points, 3.4 rebounds and 1.4 assists.

On November 19, 2025, Watson set new career-highs with 32 points and 12 rebounds in his third start of the season - a 125-118 road win over the New Orleans Pelicans. His playing time continued to trend upward from mid-November while peaking at 44 minutes in a January overtime win over the 76ers. Watson won his first NBA Western Conference Player of the Week Award for his play during the week of January 5-11, 2026, averaging 24.5 points, 8 rebounds, 4 assists, 1.3 steals and 1.8 blocks. On January 22, Watson notched a new career-high in points, pouring in 35 points to help Denver defeat the Washington Wizards, 107–97. His expansion in role and usage rate (an unforeseen 20.6%) coincided with injuries to core starters Aaron Gordon and Christian Braun, who missed a combined 84 games missed throughout the year. While superstar Nikola Jokić was out of action for 15 games from the end of December to the end of January, Watson shined while averaging 22.1 ppg on 16.2 FGA and shooting 44% from distance. He made 54 total appearances, including 40 starts, for the Nuggets during the 2025–26 season, averaging career highs of 14.6 points, 4.9 rebounds, 2.1 assists, and 0.9 steals. He scored 30+ points in a game four times, after none in his first three seasons.

Peyton Watson did not play in the 2026 NBA playoffs because his agent Rich Paul decided to keep him out to protect his health ahead of free agency. According to Paul on the Game Over podcast, this decision aimed to take care of Watson's future. This caused great frustration and annoyance among his Denver Nuggets teammates.

=== Cleveland Cavaliers (2026–present) ===
On August 20, 2026, Watson was traded to the Cleveland Cavaliers as part of a sign-and-trade deal in which the Nuggets acquired Julian Reese from the Washington Wizards. He signed a four-year, $88 million contract with the Cavaliers.

== National team career ==
Watson represented the United States at the 2021 FIBA Under-19 World Cup in Latvia. He averaged four points, 3.4 rebounds and 2.7 assists per game, helping his team win the gold medal.

== Career statistics ==
Legend
GP	Games played	GS	Games started	MPG	Minutes per game
FG%	Field goal percentage	3P%	3-point field goal percentage	FT%	Free throw percentage
RPG	Rebounds per game	APG	Assists per game	SPG	Steals per game
BPG	Blocks per game	PPG	Points per game	**Bold**	Career high
†	Won an NBA championship

=== NBA ===
==== Regular season ====
Year	Team	GP	GS	MPG	FG%	3P%	FT%	RPG	APG	SPG	BPG	PPG
2022–23^{†}	Denver	23	2	8.1	**.492**	**.429**	.550	1.6	.5	.1	.5	3.3
2023–24	Denver	**80**	4	18.6	.465	.296	.670	3.2	1.1	.5	1.1	6.7
2024–25	Denver	68	18	24.4	.477	.353	.693	3.4	1.4	.7	**1.4**	8.1
2025–26	Denver	54	**40**	**29.6**	.491	.411	**.730**	**4.9**	**2.1**	**.9**	1.1	**14.6**
Career		225	64	21.9	.479	.361	.697	3.5	1.3	.6	1.1	8.7

==== Playoffs ====
Year	Team	GP	GS	MPG	FG%	3P%	FT%	RPG	APG	SPG	BPG	PPG
2023^{†}	Denver	5	0	2.7	.400	**.500**	—	.8	.2	.0	.2	1.0
2024	Denver	10	0	9.0	.250	.250	**.500**	1.5	**.4**	.0	**.6**	1.8
2025	Denver	**14**	0	**14.2**	**.407**	.368	**.500**	**2.9**	.3	**.8**	**.6**	**4.5**
Career		29	0	10.4	.364	.333	.500	2.1	.3	.4	.6	3.0

=== College ===
Year	Team	GP	GS	MPG	FG%	3P%	FT%	RPG	APG	SPG	BPG	PPG
2021–22	UCLA	32	0	12.7	.322	.226	.688	2.9	.8	.6	.6	3.3

== Personal life ==
Watson's father, Julio, is a medical device representative, and his mother is an event planner. He has a younger brother, Christian, who plays basketball at Long Beach Polytechnic High School, and a younger sister, Jolie Grace.
