= Zeke Nnaji =

American basketball player (born 2001)

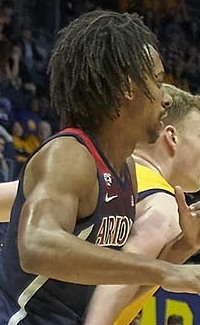
- Nnaji with Arizona in 2020

No. 22 – Denver Nuggets
- Position: Power forward / center
- League: NBA

Personal information
- Born: January 9, 2001 (age 25) Minneapolis, Minnesota, U.S.
- Listed height: 6 ft 10 in (2.08 m)
- Listed weight: 240 lb (109 kg)

Career information
- High school: Lakeville North (Lakeville, Minnesota); Hopkins (Minnetonka, Minnesota)
- College: Arizona (2019–2020)
- NBA draft: 2020: 1st round, 22nd overall pick
- Drafted by: Denver Nuggets
- Playing career: 2020–present

Career history
- 2020–present: Denver Nuggets

Career highlights
- NBA champion (2023); First-team All-Pac-12 (2020); Pac-12 Freshman of the Year (2020); Pac-12 All-Freshman team (2020)
- Stats at NBA.com
- Stats at Basketball Reference

Ezekiel Tobechukwu "Zeke" Nnaji (/ˈnɑːdʒi/ NAH-jee; born January 9, 2001) is an American professional basketball player for the Denver Nuggets of the National Basketball Association (NBA). He played college basketball for the Arizona Wildcats and was drafted 22nd overall by the Nuggets in the 2020 NBA draft.

== Early life ==
Nnaji was born in Minneapolis, Minnesota. He played baseball and soccer before starting basketball due to his height. He has played the piano since first grade. Nnaji composes his own music.

== High school career ==
Nnaji started playing high school basketball for Lakeville North High School in Lakeville, Minnesota, before transferring to Hopkins High School in Minnetonka, Minnesota. As a senior, he averaged 24.1 points and 9.4 rebounds per game and led Hopkins to a Minnesota 4A state title over Lakeville North. Nnaji had 14 points and 12 rebounds in the championship game. He played for the Adidas-sponsored D1 Minnesota club alongside Matthew Hurt. Nnaji was invited to the Iverson Classic game. Nnaji was ranked 22nd in his class and a five-star recruit by Rivals but was considered a four-star recruit by most other recruiting services. He committed to play college basketball for Arizona over offers from Kansas, Kentucky, North Carolina and UCLA.

== College career ==
On November 6, 2019, Nnaji made his college debut, scoring 20 points in 21 minutes to help Arizona defeat Northern Arizona, 91–52. Five days later, he was named Pac-12 Conference Freshman of the Week. Nnaji won the same award in the following week, most notably posting 26 points and 11 rebounds in an 87–39 win over San Jose State. He became the first Arizona player to score 20 points and collect 10 rebounds in his first three games since Brandon Ashley did so against Long Beach State in the 2012–13 season. At the conclusion of the regular season, Nnaji was named first-team All-Pac-12 and Pac-12 Freshman of the Year. Nnaji averaged 16.1 points per game on 57 percent shooting and grabbed 8.6 rebounds per game as a freshman. Following the season, he declared for the 2020 NBA draft.

== Professional career ==
Nnaji was selected with the 22nd pick in the 2020 NBA draft by the Denver Nuggets. On December 1, 2020, Nnaji signed his rookie scale contract with the Nuggets. Nnaji became an NBA champion when the Nuggets defeated the Miami Heat in five games in the 2023 NBA Finals.

Nnaji signed a four-year, $32 million contract extension with the Nuggets on October 22, 2023.

== Career statistics ==
Legend
GP	Games played	GS	Games started	MPG	Minutes per game
FG%	Field goal percentage	3P%	3-point field goal percentage	FT%	Free throw percentage
RPG	Rebounds per game	APG	Assists per game	SPG	Steals per game
BPG	Blocks per game	PPG	Points per game	**Bold**	Career high
†	Won an NBA championship

=== NBA ===
==== Regular season ====
Year	Team	GP	GS	MPG	FG%	3P%	FT%	RPG	APG	SPG	BPG	PPG
2020–21	Denver	42	1	9.5	.481	.407	**.800**	1.5	.2	.2	.1	3.2
2021–22	Denver	41	1	**17.0**	.516	**.463**	.631	**3.6**	.4	**.4**	.3	**6.6**
2022–23^{†}	Denver	53	**5**	13.7	**.561**	.262	.645	2.6	.3	.3	.4	5.2
2023–24	Denver	**58**	0	9.9	.463	.261	.677	2.2	**.6**	.3	**.7**	3.2
2024–25	Denver	57	4	10.7	.496	.327	.614	1.6	.4	**.4**	**.7**	3.2
2025–26	Denver	52	4	12.0	.470	.259	.773	2.6	**.6**	.3	.5	3.7
Career		303	15	12.0	.503	.345	.671	2.3	.4	.3	.5	4.1

==== Playoffs ====
Year	Team	GP	GS	MPG	FG%	3P%	FT%	RPG	APG	SPG	BPG	PPG
2021	Denver	5	0	3.5	.500	.429	.500	.4	.4	.2	.0	2.4
2022	Denver	2	0	4.3	**1.000**	**1.000**	—	.0	.0	.0	.0	1.5
2023^{†}	Denver	5	0	2.4	.500	.333	—	.4	.0	.2	.0	1.0
2024	Denver	3	0	4.7	.667	—	.500	.7	.0	.0	.3	1.7
2025	Denver	**6**	0	5.7	.125	.167	.571	1.2	.3	.2	.3	1.2
2026	Denver	2	0	**9.5**	**1.000**	**1.000**	**.833**	**1.5**	**.5**	**.5**	.0	**5.0**
Career		23	0	4.6	.462	.389	.647	.7	.2	.2	.1	1.8

=== College ===
Year	Team	GP	GS	MPG	FG%	3P%	FT%	RPG	APG	SPG	BPG	PPG
2019–20	Arizona	32	32	30.7	.570	.294	.760	8.4	.8	.7	.9	16.1

== Personal life ==
Nnaji's father is from Nigeria and his mother is from Minnesota. His younger sister, Maya, played college basketball at Arizona for two years before quitting to pursue her education. His uncle, Obiora Nnaji, played center at the University of Florida from 1997 to 1999. His cousin, Elvis Nnaji, plays for the George Mason Patriots.
