= Curtis Jones (basketball) =

American basketball player (born 2001)

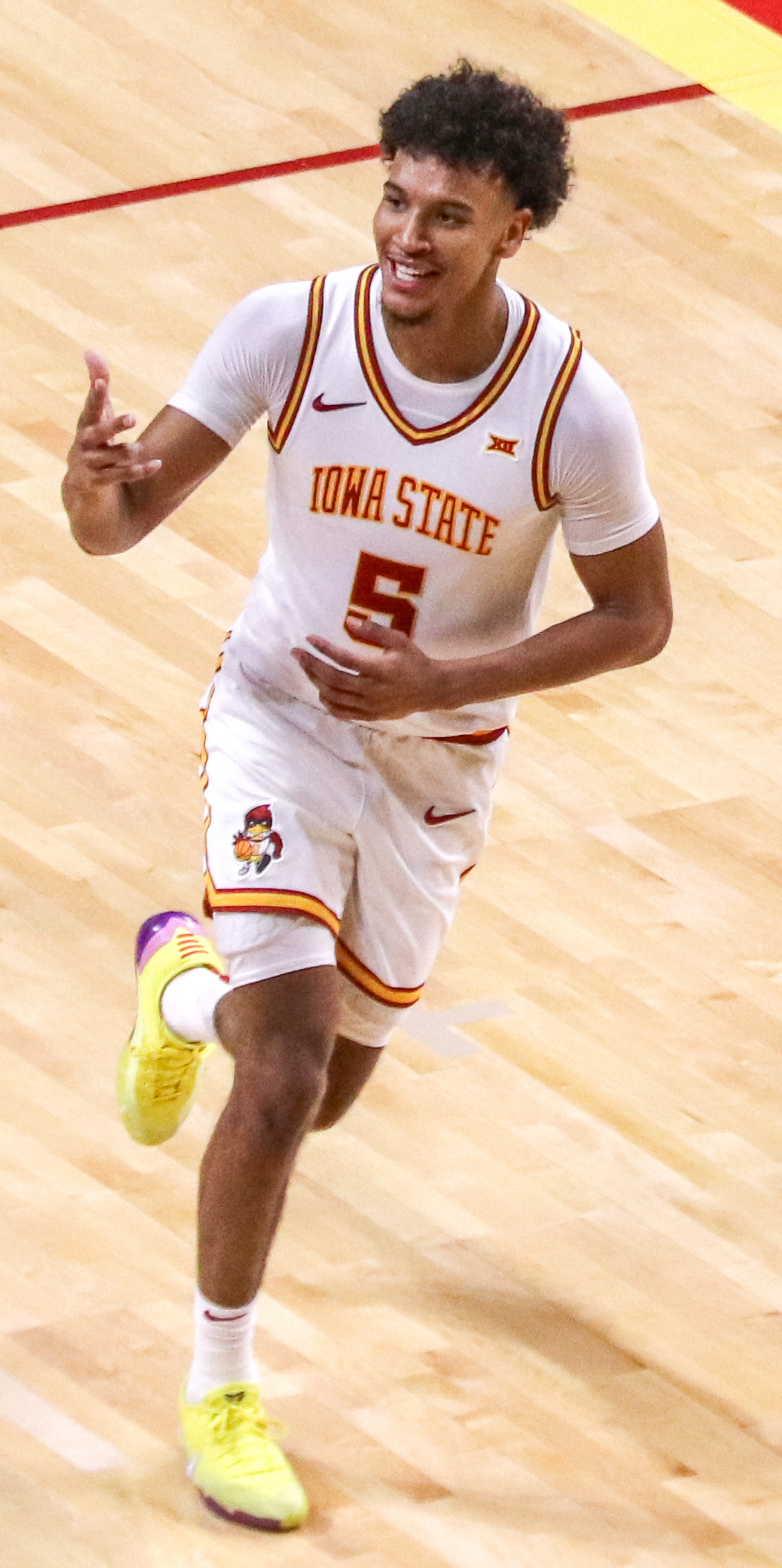
- Jones with the Iowa State Cyclones in 2025

No. 5 – Cleveland Charge
- Position: Shooting guard
- League: NBA G League

Personal information
- Born: October 4, 2001 (age 25) Minneapolis, Minnesota, U.S.
- Listed height: 6 ft 3 in (1.91 m)
- Listed weight: 195 lb (88 kg)

Career information
- High school: South (Minneapolis, Minnesota); Cretin-Derham Hall (Saint Paul, Minnesota)
- College: Indian Hills CC (2020–2021); Buffalo (2021–2023); Iowa State (2023–2025)
- NBA draft: 2025: undrafted
- Playing career: 2025–present

Career history
- 2025–2026: Denver Nuggets
- 2025–2026: →Grand Rapids Gold
- 2026–present: Cleveland Charge

Career highlights
- Big 12 Sixth Man Award (2025); First-team All-Big 12 (2025); Third-team All-MAC (2023)
- Stats at NBA.com
- Stats at Basketball Reference

Curtis Jalen Jones (born October 4, 2001) is an American professional basketball player for the Cleveland Charge of the NBA G League. He played college basketball for the Indian Hills Warriors, Buffalo Bulls and Iowa State Cyclones.

== Early life and high school career ==
Jones grew up in Minneapolis, Minnesota and initially attended South High School before transferring to Cretin-Derham Hall High School. Jones had no Division I or Division II scholarship offers out of high school.

== College career ==
Jones began his college career at Indian Hills Community College. He averaged 12.1 points, 6.0 rebounds, and 5.5 assists per game as a freshman with the Warriors. After the season, Jones transferred to Buffalo. He averaged 2.5 points and 1.3 assists in 28 games, all off the bench, in his first season with the Bulls. Jones was named third-team All-MAC as a junior after averaging 15.0 points, 4.8 rebounds, and 3.0 assists per game. After the season, he entered the NCAA transfer portal.

Jones transferred to Iowa State. He averaged 11.0 points, 2.9 rebounds and 2.0 assists per game in his first season with the Cyclones.

== Professional career ==
On June 27, 2025, Jones signed an Exhibit 10 contract with the Denver Nuggets after going unselected in the 2025 NBA draft.

On July 20, after a standout summer league showing, Jones signed a two-way contract with the Nuggets.

In July 2026, Jones joined the Boston Celtics for the 2026 NBA Summer League.

== Career statistics ==
Legend
GP	Games played	GS	Games started	MPG	Minutes per game
FG%	Field goal percentage	3P%	3-point field goal percentage	FT%	Free throw percentage
RPG	Rebounds per game	APG	Assists per game	SPG	Steals per game
BPG	Blocks per game	PPG	Points per game	**Bold**	Career high

=== NBA ===
Year	Team	GP	GS	MPG	FG%	3P%	FT%	RPG	APG	SPG	BPG	PPG
2025–26	Denver	10	0	8.8	.407	.333	.500	1.1	1.0	.4	.0	2.9
Career		10	0	8.8	.407	.333	.500	1.1	1.0	.4	.0	2.9
