= Hunter Tyson =

American basketball player (born 2000)

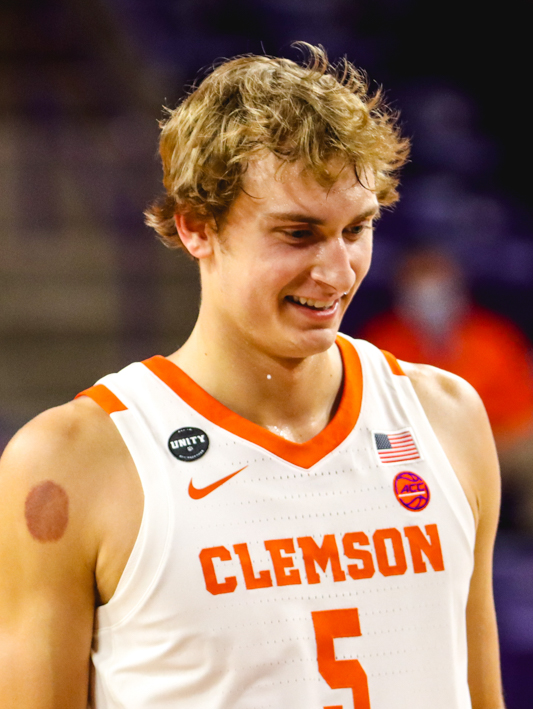
- Tyson with Clemson in 2020

No. 4 – Maxima Roma
- Position: Power forward
- League: LBA; EuroCup

Personal information
- Born: June 13, 2000 (age 26) Monroe, North Carolina, U.S.
- Listed height: 6 ft 8 in (2.03 m)
- Listed weight: 215 lb (98 kg)

Career information
- High school: Piedmont (Monroe, North Carolina)
- College: Clemson (2018–2023)
- NBA draft: 2023: 2nd round, 37th overall pick
- Drafted by: Oklahoma City Thunder
- Playing career: 2023–present

Career history
- 2023–2026: Denver Nuggets
- 2023–2024: →Grand Rapids Gold
- 2026: Gigantes de Carolina
- 2026–present: Maxima Roma

Career highlights
- First-team All-ACC (2023)
- Stats at NBA.com
- Stats at Basketball Reference
Medals
Men's basketball
Representing United States
Summer Universiade
Gold medal – first place	2019 Italy	Team competition

Hunter Blaise Tyson (born June 13, 2000) is an American professional basketball player for Maxima Roma of the Lega Basket Serie A (LBA) and the EuroCup. He played college basketball for the Clemson Tigers, and was drafted by the Oklahoma City Thunder, but was subsequently traded to the Denver Nuggets with the 37th overall pick in the 2023 NBA draft.

== Early life and high school career ==
Tyson grew up in Monroe, North Carolina and attended Piedmont High School. He averaged 27.1 points per game as a senior.

== College career ==
Tyson played in 31 games, all off the bench, during his freshman season with the Clemson Tigers and averaged 1.6 points per game. He averaged 5.5 points and 3.0 rebounds over 31 games with three starts as a sophomore. Tyson averaged 7.5 points and 4.2 rebounds in 19 games during his junior season. He sustained a facial fracture midway through the season in a game against Virginia Tech, causing him to miss five games and wear a protective mask for the remainder of the season after he returned. As a senior, he averaged 10 points and 5.5 rebounds per game.

Tyson decided to use the extra year of eligibility granted to college athletes who played in the 2020 season due to the coronavirus pandemic and return to Clemson for a fifth season. He was named first-team All-Atlantic Coast Conference at the end of his final season after averaging 15.3 points and 9.6 rebounds per game. Tyson was also the recipient of the Skip Prosser Award as the scholar-athlete of the year.

== Professional career ==
=== Denver Nuggets (2023–2026) ===
Tyson was selected by the Oklahoma City Thunder with the 37th overall pick in the second round of the 2023 NBA draft, then subsequently traded to the Denver Nuggets. On July 6, 2023, the Nuggets announced that they had signed Tyson. He made 18 appearances for Denver during his rookie campaign, averaging 1.1 points, 0.5 rebounds, and 0.1 assists.

Tyson made 51 appearances (including two starts) for the Nuggets during the 2024–25 NBA season, posting averages of 2.6 points, 1.5 rebounds, and 0.4 assists. He played in 21 contests (including another two starts) for Denver in the 2025–26 season, averaging 2.2 points, 1.7 rebounds, and 0.8 assists.

On February 5, 2026, Tyson was traded to the Brooklyn Nets alongside a 2032 second-round draft pick in exchange for a 2026 second-round draft pick. However, he was waived by the team shortly after the trade.

=== Gigantes de Carolina (2026) ===
Shortly after, Tyson signed with Gigantes de Carolina of the Baloncesto Superior Nacional league, and he serves as the starting center on the team. On April 26, 2026, against the Capitanes de Arecibo, Tyson earned himself a double double, recording a career–highs in points (38) and rebounds (14) paired with three assists in 30 minutes of playtime. With the team, Tyson appeared in 16 games, averaging 18 points, 5.9 rebounds, and 1.8 assists.

=== Maxima Roma (2026–present) ===
On September 21, 2026, Tyson signed with Maxima Roma of the Lega Basket Serie A.

== National team career ==
Tyson was a part of the Clemson team chosen to represent the United States in the 2019 Summer Universiade in Italy.

== Career statistics ==
Legend
GP	Games played	GS	Games started	MPG	Minutes per game
FG%	Field goal percentage	3P%	3-point field goal percentage	FT%	Free throw percentage
RPG	Rebounds per game	APG	Assists per game	SPG	Steals per game
BPG	Blocks per game	PPG	Points per game	**Bold**	Career high

=== NBA ===
==== Regular season ====
Year	Team	GP	GS	MPG	FG%	3P%	FT%	RPG	APG	SPG	BPG	PPG
2023–24	Denver	18	0	2.7	**.400**	.286	—	.5	.1	.1	.0	1.1
2024–25	Denver	**51**	**2**	**7.8**	.375	**.311**	.750	1.5	.4	**.2**	**.1**	**2.6**
2025–26	Denver	21	**2**	7.7	.269	.212	**.846**	**1.7**	**.8**	.1	.0	2.2
Career		90	4	6.8	.349	.281	.780	1.4	.4	.1	.1	2.2

==== Playoffs ====
Year	Team	GP	GS	MPG	FG%	3P%	FT%	RPG	APG	SPG	BPG	PPG
2024	Denver	3	0	4.6	.000	.000	.500	1.0	.3	.0	.0	.3
2025	Denver	**5**	0	**6.0**	**.500**	**.200**	**1.000**	**1.6**	**.4**	**.2**	.0	**3.0**
Career		8	0	5.5	.357	.125	.833	1.4	.4	.1	.0	2.0

== Personal life ==
Tyson's younger brother, Cade Tyson, plays for the Minnesota Golden Gophers after starting his college career at Belmont. Tyson is also a devout Christian.

On August 30, 2025, Tyson married his long-time girlfriend, Bella.

== See also ==
- List of All-Atlantic Coast Conference men's basketball teams
