= David Adelman (basketball) =

American basketball coach (born 1981)

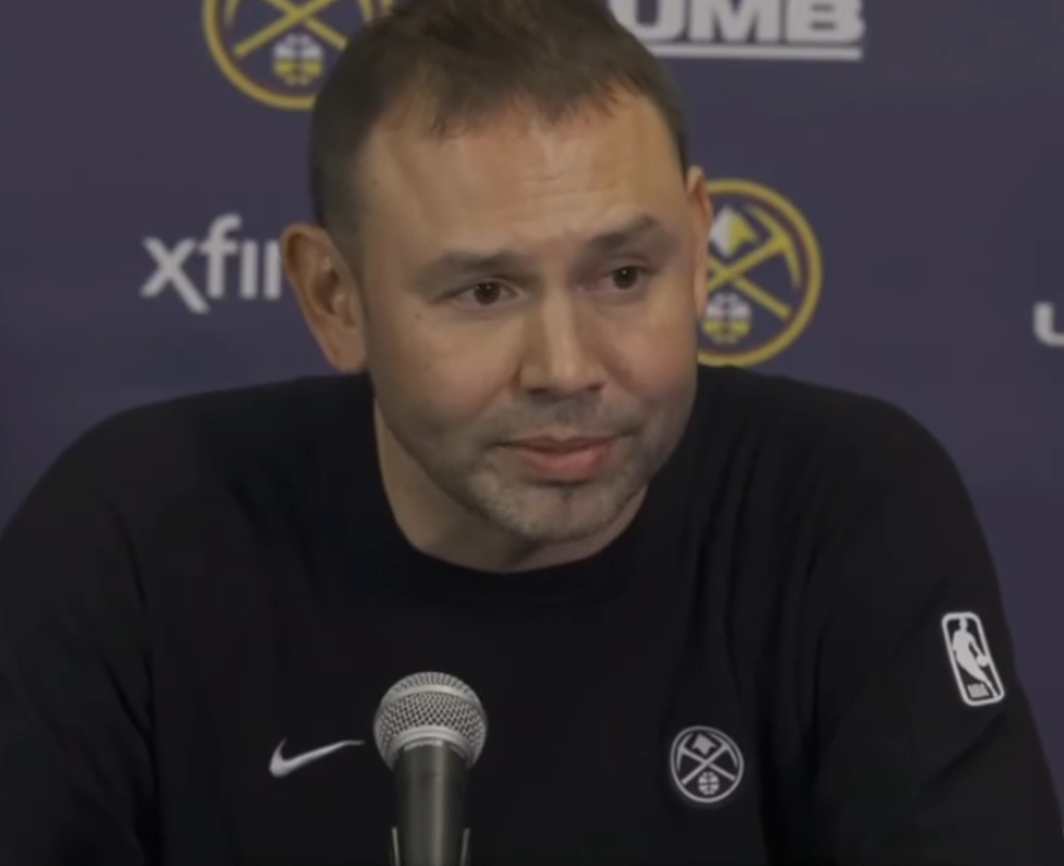
- Adelman in 2025

Denver Nuggets
- Position: Head coach
- League: NBA

Personal information
- Born: May 15, 1981 (age 45) Salem, Oregon, U.S.

Career information
- High school: Jesuit (Beaverton, Oregon)
- College: Southern New Hampshire
- Coaching career: 2002–present

Career history

Coaching
- 2002–2006: Jesuit HS (assistant)
- 2006–2011: Lincoln HS
- 2011–2016: Minnesota Timberwolves (assistant)
- 2016–2017: Orlando Magic (assistant)
- 2017–2025: Denver Nuggets (assistant)
- 2025–present: Denver Nuggets

Career highlights
- As assistant coach: NBA champion (2023)

David Leonard Adelman (born May 15, 1981) is an American professional basketball coach who is the head coach for the Denver Nuggets of the National Basketball Association (NBA). He is the son of former NBA coach Rick Adelman.

== Early life ==
Adelman was born to Mary Kay and Rick Adelman in Salem, Oregon. He grew up in Bull Mountain in the Portland metro area. Adelman was a ball boy for the Portland Trail Blazers, while his father was the team's head coach. Adelman played high school basketball for Jesuit High School in Beaverton, Oregon. He was a high school teammate of future Golden State Warriors general manager Mike Dunleavy Jr. Adelman attended Southern New Hampshire University where he played college basketball for the Penmen and graduated with a bachelor's degree in history.

== Coaching career ==
=== High school (2002–2011) ===
Adelman began coaching basketball as a volunteer assistant at his alma mater Jesuit High School in Beaverton, Oregon under head coach Gene Potter from 2002 to 2006. He then became the head coach at Lincoln High School in Portland, Oregon, leading the Cardinals to three city championships (2006–07, 2009–10 and 2010–11) and reaching the 6A championships where the Cardinals lost to Grant High School.

=== Minnesota Timberwolves (2011–2016) ===
In 2011, Adelman joined the Minnesota Timberwolves as a player development coach under his father Rick Adelman. After Rick retired in 2014, Adelman continued on with Minnesota, becoming the head coach for the NBA Summer League team for three seasons under Flip Saunders (who died in 2015) and then Sam Mitchell.

=== Orlando Magic assistant (2016–2017) ===
Adelman left the Timberwolves in 2016 when he joined the Orlando Magic as an assistant coach under Frank Vogel for one season.

=== Denver Nuggets (2017–present) ===
Adelman joined the Denver Nuggets prior to the 2017–18 NBA season as an assistant under Michael Malone. Adelman won an NBA championship when the Nuggets defeated the Miami Heat in the 2023 NBA Finals in five games.

On April 8, 2025, Adelman was named interim head coach of the Nuggets after Malone was fired with only three games remaining. With Adelman, Denver finished the regular season by winning each of their final three games to secure the fourth seed in the Western Conference heading into the 2025 NBA playoffs. In the first round, the Nuggets defeated the Los Angeles Clippers in seven games before losing to the top-seeded eventual NBA champion Oklahoma City Thunder in a seven-game conference semifinals series.

On May 22, Adelman was named the full-time head coach of the Nuggets after team executives were impressed with Adelman's coaching performance and leadership as interim head coach in the 2025 playoffs.

== Personal life ==
Adelman is one of six children. Three of his siblings also went into coaching basketball. Adelman's sister Kathy Adelman Naro is a highly regarded girls’ high school coach in Oregon. Adelman's brother Pat Adelman led the boys at Lincoln High School to the class 6A semifinals in 2018. Adelman's brother R.J. Adelman worked a range of jobs including assistant coach, scout, and video coordinator in Seattle, Sacramento, Houston, and Minnesota before being fatally struck by a car in 2018. Adelman's sisters Laura and Caitlin reside in Oregon. Adelman's brother in-law John Naro currently coaches the Beaverton High School (Oregon) girls basketball team. Adelman's cousin Dan Burke is a longtime NBA assistant coach.

== Head coaching record ==
Legend
Regular season	G	Games coached	W	Games won	L	Games lost	W–L %	Win–loss %
Playoffs	PG	Playoff games	PW	Playoff wins	PL	Playoff losses	PW–L %	Playoff win–loss %

Team	Year	G	W	L	W–L%	Finish	PG	PW	PL	PW–L%	Result
Denver	2024–25	3	3	0	1.000	2nd in Northwest	14	7	7	.500	Lost in conference semifinals
Denver	2025–26	82	54	28	.659	2nd in Northwest	6	2	4	.333	Lost in first round
Career		85	57	28	.671		20	9	11	.450	

== Highlights and awards ==
- Won a state championship as a player at Jesuit High School in 1999.
- Led Jesuit High School to a state title in 2005.
- 83–53 (.610) record with Lincoln High School. Led the Cardinals to three city championships (2006–'07, 2009–'10, 2010–'11). Additionally, reached the 6A Championship game in 2009.
- Named PIL Coach of the Year three times.
- Assistant coach in the 2019 NBA All-Star Game.
- Traveled to the 2020 NBA Bubble in Orlando, Florida where the Denver Nuggets became the first team in NBA history to overcome two subsequent 3–1 deficits in the postseason. The Nuggets lost in Game 5 to the Los Angeles Lakers who went on to win the 2020 Championship.
- Assistant coach in the 2023 NBA Finals.
