= 2024–25 Denver Nuggets season =

NBA professional basketball team season

- Head coach: Michael Malone (until April 8); David Adelman (interim; from April 8 onward)
- President: Josh Kroenke
- General manager: Calvin Booth (until April 8); Ben Tenzer (interim; from April 8 onward)
- Owners: Ann Walton Kroenke
- Arena: Ball Arena

Results
- Record: 50–32 (.610)
- Place: Division: 2nd (Northwest); Conference: 4th (Western)
- Playoff finish: Conference semifinals (lost to Thunder 3–4)
- Stats at Basketball Reference

Local media
- Television: Altitude Sports and Entertainment; KTVD (for 20 select games); KUSA (for 10 select games)
- Radio: KKSE

The 2024–25 Denver Nuggets season was the 49th season for the franchise in the National Basketball Association (NBA).

On March 7, 2025, center Nikola Jokić became the first player in NBA history to record a 30–20–20 game. It came in an overtime victory against the Phoenix Suns.

On April 8, with three games remaining in the regular season, the Nuggets surprisingly announced that they had fired both head coach Michael Malone and general manager Calvin Booth, with Booth's contract not being renewed by this date. Their combined firings would be made in relation to both Malone and Booth not getting along with each other well behind the scenes.

On April 13, the Nuggets clinched their seventh straight playoff berth after they defeated the Houston Rockets.

In the 2025 playoffs, the Nuggets defeated the Los Angeles Clippers in seven games, which included a buzzer-beating game-winning putback dunk from Aaron Gordon in Game 4. They subsequently lost to the eventual Western Conference champion Oklahoma City Thunder in 7 games, despite a game-winning three-pointer from Gordon in Game 1. Nikola Jokić was voted second in MVP voting behind Shai Gilgeous-Alexander of the Thunder.

The Denver Nuggets drew an average home attendance of 19,783, the 5th-highest of all NBA teams.

== Draft ==
Round	Pick	Player	Position(s)	Nationality	College / club
1	22	DaRon Holmes II	Power Forward	United States	Dayton

The Nuggets originally held one first-round pick and one second-round pick entering the draft (which was two days long instead of just one day long like it previously was since the NBA draft was shortened down to two rounds back in 1989). A second round pick that originally started out with Denver for this draft would eventually be traded to the Phoenix Suns, which later led to Phoenix forfeiting that selection entirely during the previous season due to early involvements with Drew Eubanks. This would be the third straight year in a row where a second-round pick that Denver previously held onto at one point in time would later be forfeited by another team due to tampering violations during the free agency period. Ironically, the Suns would end up trading with the Nuggets on the first night of the draft, with Phoenix acquiring both of the Nuggets' first round and second round picks they had in this draft in the 28th and 56th picks (which became Ryan Dunn from the University of Virginia and Kevin McCullar Jr. from the University of Kansas respectively) alongside second round picks in 2026 and 2031 in exchange for the 22nd pick of the draft, which became power forward DaRon Holmes II from the University of Dayton.

== Roster ==
2024–25 Denver Nuggets roster
Players

Pos.	No.	Player	Height	Weight	DOB	From
G	23	Trey Alexander (TW)	6 ft 4 in (1.93 m)	185 lb (84 kg)	2003-05-02	Creighton
G/F	0	Christian Braun	6 ft 6 in (1.98 m)	220 lb (100 kg)	2001-04-17	Kansas
F	31	Vlatko Čančar (injured)	6 ft 8 in (2.03 m)	235 lb (107 kg)	1997-04-10	Slovenia
F	32	Aaron Gordon	6 ft 8 in (2.03 m)	235 lb (107 kg)	1995-09-16	Arizona
C	13	PJ Hall (TW)	6 ft 11 in (2.11 m)	245 lb (111 kg)	2002-02-21	Clemson
F	14	DaRon Holmes II (injured)	6 ft 10 in (2.08 m)	225 lb (102 kg)	2002-09-15	Dayton
C	15	Nikola Jokić	6 ft 11 in (2.11 m)	285 lb (129 kg)	1995-02-19	Serbia
F	21	Spencer Jones (TW)	6 ft 7 in (2.01 m)	225 lb (102 kg)	2001-06-14	Stanford
C	6	DeAndre Jordan	6 ft 11 in (2.11 m)	265 lb (120 kg)	1988-07-21	Texas A&M
G	27	Jamal Murray	6 ft 4 in (1.93 m)	215 lb (98 kg)	1997-02-23	Kentucky
F/C	22	Zeke Nnaji	6 ft 9 in (2.06 m)	240 lb (109 kg)	2001-01-09	Arizona
G	24	Jalen Pickett	6 ft 2 in (1.88 m)	202 lb (92 kg)	1999-10-22	Penn State
F	1	Michael Porter Jr.	6 ft 10 in (2.08 m)	218 lb (99 kg)	1998-06-29	Missouri
F/C	9	Dario Šarić	6 ft 10 in (2.08 m)	225 lb (102 kg)	1994-04-08	Croatia
G/F	3	Julian Strawther	6 ft 6 in (1.98 m)	205 lb (93 kg)	2002-04-18	Gonzaga
F	5	Hunter Tyson	6 ft 8 in (2.03 m)	215 lb (98 kg)	2000-06-13	Clemson
G/F	8	Peyton Watson	6 ft 7 in (2.01 m)	200 lb (91 kg)	2002-09-11	UCLA
G	4	Russell Westbrook	6 ft 4 in (1.93 m)	200 lb (91 kg)	1988-11-12	UCLA

Coaches
Head coach
- David Adelman (interim)
Assistant(s)
- John Beckett
- Ryan Bowen
- Popeye Jones
- Charles Klask
- Ryan Saunders
- Ognjen Stojaković
- Elvis Valcarcel

Legend
- (DP) Unsigned draft pick
- (FA) Free agent
- (S) Suspended
- (GL) On assignment to G League
- (TW) Two-way affiliate player
- Injured

Roster
Updated: April 8, 2025

== Standings ==
=== Division ===
Northwest Division	W	L	PCT	GB	Home	Road	Div	GP
z – Oklahoma City Thunder	68	14	.829	–	36‍–‍6	32‍–‍8	12‍–‍4	82
x – Denver Nuggets	50	32	.610	18.0	26‍–‍15	24‍–‍17	8‍–‍8	82
x – Minnesota Timberwolves	49	33	.598	19.0	25‍–‍16	24‍–‍17	11‍–‍5	82
Portland Trail Blazers	36	46	.439	32.0	22‍–‍19	14‍–‍27	6‍–‍10	82
Utah Jazz	17	65	.207	51.0	10‍–‍31	7‍–‍34	3‍–‍13	82

=== Conference ===
Western Conference
#	Team	W	L	PCT	GB	GP
1	z – Oklahoma City Thunder *	68	14	.829	–	82
2	y – Houston Rockets *	52	30	.634	16.0	82
3	y – Los Angeles Lakers *	50	32	.610	18.0	82
4	x – Denver Nuggets	50	32	.610	18.0	82
5	x – Los Angeles Clippers	50	32	.610	18.0	82
6	x – Minnesota Timberwolves	49	33	.598	19.0	82
7	x – Golden State Warriors	48	34	.585	20.0	82
8	x – Memphis Grizzlies	48	34	.585	20.0	82
9	pi – Sacramento Kings	40	42	.488	28.0	82
10	pi – Dallas Mavericks	39	43	.476	29.0	82
11	Phoenix Suns	36	46	.439	32.0	82
12	Portland Trail Blazers	36	46	.439	32.0	82
13	San Antonio Spurs	34	48	.415	34.0	82
14	New Orleans Pelicans	21	61	.256	47.0	82
15	Utah Jazz	17	65	.207	51.0	82

== Game log ==
=== Preseason ===
2024 preseason game log
Total: 1–4 (Home: 0–3; Road: 1–1)
Preseason: 1–4 (home: 0–3; road: 1–1)

Game	Date	Team	Score	High points	High rebounds	High assists	Location Attendance	Record
1	October 4	Boston	L 103–107	Nikola Jokić (14)	Nikola Jokić (8)	Russell Westbrook (8)	(United Arab Emirates) Etihad Arena; 12,002	0–1
2	October 6	@ Boston	L 104–130	Nikola Jokić (20)	Hunter Tyson (10)	Trey Alexander (5)	(United Arab Emirates) Etihad Arena; 11,527	0–2
3	October 13	Phoenix	L 114–118	Jokić, Porter Jr., Strawther (21)	Nikola Jokić (14)	Nikola Jokić (9)	Ball Arena; 17,310	0–3
4	October 15	Oklahoma City	L 94–124	Michael Porter Jr. (15)	DeAndre Jordan (9)	Aaron Gordon (5)	Ball Arena; 17,022	0–4
5	October 17	@ Minnesota	W 132–126	Julian Strawther (33)	Michael Porter Jr. (8)	Nikola Jokić (7)	Target Center; 13,166	1–4

2024–25 preseason schedule

=== Regular season ===
2024–25 game log
Total: 50–32 (Home: 26–15; Road: 24–17)
October: 2–2 (home: 0–2; road: 2–0)

Game	Date	Team	Score	High points	High rebounds	High assists	Location Attendance	Record
1	October 24	Oklahoma City	L 87–102	Braun, Jokić (16)	Nikola Jokić (12)	Nikola Jokić (13)	Ball Arena; 19,786	0–1
2	October 26	L.A. Clippers	L 104–109	Nikola Jokić (41)	Jokić, Porter Jr. (9)	Jamal Murray (5)	Ball Arena; 19,691	0–2
3	October 28	@ Toronto	W 127–125 (OT)	Nikola Jokić (40)	Aaron Gordon (11)	Aaron Gordon (8)	Scotiabank Arena; 19,082	1–2
4	October 29	@ Brooklyn	W 144–139 (OT)	Nikola Jokić (29)	Nikola Jokić (18)	Nikola Jokić (16)	Barclays Center; 17,926	2–2

November: 8–5 (home: 5–2; road: 3–3)

Game	Date	Team	Score	High points	High rebounds	High assists	Location Attendance	Record
5	November 1	@ Minnesota	L 116–119	Aaron Gordon (31)	Aaron Gordon (11)	Nikola Jokić (13)	Target Center; 18,978	2–3
6	November 2	Utah	W 129–103	Nikola Jokić (27)	Nikola Jokić (16)	Nikola Jokić (9)	Ball Arena; 19,702	3–3
7	November 4	Toronto	W 121–119	Nikola Jokić (28)	Nikola Jokić (14)	Nikola Jokić (13)	Ball Arena; 19,525	4–3
8	November 6	Oklahoma City	W 124–122	Russell Westbrook (29)	Nikola Jokić (20)	Nikola Jokić (16)	Ball Arena; 19,522	5–3
9	November 8	Miami	W 135–122	Nikola Jokić (30)	Nikola Jokić (11)	Nikola Jokić (14)	Ball Arena; 19,621	6–3
10	November 10	Dallas	W 122–120	Nikola Jokić (37)	Nikola Jokić (18)	Nikola Jokić (15)	Ball Arena; 19,908	7–3
11	November 15	@ New Orleans	L 94–101	Michael Porter Jr. (24)	Dario Šarić (8)	Jamal Murray (8)	Smoothie King Center; 16,137	7–4
12	November 17	@ Memphis	L 90–105	Julian Strawther (19)	Dario Šarić (10)	Jamal Murray (7)	FedExForum; 16,351	7–5
13	November 19	@ Memphis	W 122–110	Jamal Murray (27)	Michael Porter Jr. (11)	Russell Westbrook (14)	FedExForum; 15,377	8–5
14	November 22	Dallas	L 120–123	Nikola Jokić (33)	Nikola Jokić (17)	Jamal Murray (11)	Ball Arena; 19,923	8–6
15	November 23	@ L.A. Lakers	W 127–102	Nikola Jokić (34)	Nikola Jokić (13)	Russell Westbrook (11)	Crypto.com Arena; 18,997	9–6
16	November 25	New York	L 118–145	Russell Westbrook (27)	Michael Porter Jr. (10)	Jokić, Murray (7)	Ball Arena; 19,842	9–7
17	November 27	@ Utah	W 122–103	Nikola Jokić (30)	Nikola Jokić (10)	Jamal Murray (8)	Delta Center; 18,175	10–7

December: 8–6 (home: 4–1; road: 4–5)

Game	Date	Team	Score	High points	High rebounds	High assists	Location Attendance	Record
18	December 1	@ L.A. Clippers	L 122–126	Nikola Jokić (28)	Nikola Jokić (14)	Nikola Jokić (11)	Intuit Dome; 16,182	10–8
19	December 3	Golden State	W 119–115	Nikola Jokić (38)	Nikola Jokić (10)	Jamal Murray (7)	Ball Arena; 19,912	11–8
20	December 5	@ Cleveland	L 114–126	Nikola Jokić (27)	Nikola Jokić (20)	Nikola Jokić (11)	Rocket Mortgage Fieldhouse; 19,432	11–9
21	December 7	@ Washington	L 113–122	Nikola Jokić (56)	Nikola Jokić (16)	Russell Westbrook (12)	Capital One Arena; 16,182	11–10
22	December 8	@ Atlanta	W 141–111	Nikola Jokić (48)	Nikola Jokić (14)	Russell Westbrook (11)	State Farm Arena; 16,137	12–10
23	December 13	L.A. Clippers	W 120–98	Jamal Murray (20)	DeAndre Jordan (9)	Russell Westbrook (5)	Ball Arena; 19,779	13–10
24	December 16	@ Sacramento	W 130–129	Jamal Murray (28)	Nikola Jokić (14)	Nikola Jokić (13)	Golden 1 Center; 16,936	14–10
25	December 19	@ Portland	L 124–126	Nikola Jokić (34)	DeAndre Jordan (7)	Jamal Murray (10)	Moda Center; 16,753	14–11
26	December 22	@ New Orleans	W 132–129 (OT)	Jokić, Murray (27)	Nikola Jokić (13)	Nikola Jokić (10)	Smoothie King Center; 17,474	15–11
27	December 23	Phoenix	W 117–90	Nikola Jokić (32)	Christian Braun (7)	Jalen Pickett (8)	Ball Arena; 19,910	16–11
28	December 25	@ Phoenix	L 100–110	Nikola Jokić (25)	Nikola Jokić (15)	Jamal Murray (6)	Footprint Center; 17,071	16–12
29	December 27	Cleveland	L 135–149	Jokić, Murray (27)	Nikola Jokić (14)	Nikola Jokić (13)	Ball Arena; 19,952	16–13
30	December 28	Detroit	W 134–121	Nikola Jokić (37)	Jokić, Westbrook (9)	Jokić, Westbrook (8)	Ball Arena; 19,876	17–13
31	December 30	@ Utah	W 132–121	Nikola Jokić (36)	Nikola Jokić (22)	Nikola Jokić (11)	Delta Center; 18,175	18–13

January: 11–6 (home: 5–3; road: 6–3)

Game	Date	Team	Score	High points	High rebounds	High assists	Location Attendance	Record
32	January 1	Atlanta	W 139–120	Nikola Jokić (23)	Nikola Jokić (17)	Nikola Jokić (15)	Ball Arena; 19,902	19–13
33	January 3	San Antonio	L 110–113	Nikola Jokić (41)	Nikola Jokić (18)	Nikola Jokić (9)	Ball Arena; 19,922	19–14
34	January 4	@ San Antonio	W 122–111 (OT)	Nikola Jokić (46)	Porter Jr., Westbrook (10)	Nikola Jokić (10)	Frost Bank Center; 19,038	20–14
35	January 7	Boston	L 106–118	Russell Westbrook (26)	Michael Porter Jr. (10)	Russell Westbrook (6)	Ball Arena; 19,904	20–15
36	January 8	L.A. Clippers	W 126–103	Jamal Murray (21)	DeAndre Jordan (9)	Jamal Murray (9)	Ball Arena; 19,711	21–15
37	January 10	Brooklyn	W 124–105	Nikola Jokić (35)	Nikola Jokić (12)	Nikola Jokić (15)	Ball Arena; 19,959	22–15
38	January 12	@ Dallas	W 112–101	Russell Westbrook (21)	Nikola Jokić (18)	Nikola Jokić (9)	American Airlines Center; 20,031	23–15
39	January 14	@ Dallas	W 118–99	Jamal Murray (45)	Nikola Jokić (14)	Nikola Jokić (10)	American Airlines Center; 19,798	24–15
40	January 15	Houston	L 108–128	Braun, Murray (22)	DeAndre Jordan (8)	Murray, Pickett, Šarić (5)	Ball Arena; 19,837	24–16
41	January 17	@ Miami	W 133–113	Jamal Murray (30)	Nikola Jokić (12)	Nikola Jokić (10)	Kaseya Center; 19,828	25–16
42	January 19	@ Orlando	W 113–100	Braun, Jokić (20)	Nikola Jokić (14)	Nikola Jokić (10)	Kia Center; 18,846	26–16
43	January 21	Philadelphia	W 144–109	Nikola Jokić (27)	Nikola Jokić (13)	Nikola Jokić (10)	Ball Arena; 19,521	27–16
44	January 23	Sacramento	W 132–123	Nikola Jokić (35)	Nikola Jokić (22)	Nikola Jokić (17)	Ball Arena; 19,676	28–16
45	January 25	@ Minnesota	L 104–133	Jamal Murray (25)	Jordan, Westbrook (6)	Nikola Jokić (11)	Target Center; 18,978	28–17
46	January 27	@ Chicago	L 121–129	Nikola Jokić (33)	Nikola Jokić (12)	Nikola Jokić (14)	United Center; 19,661	28–18
47	January 29	@ New York	L 112–122	Jamal Murray (33)	Russell Westbrook (14)	Jokić, Murray (6)	Madison Square Garden; 19,812	28–19
48	January 31	@ Philadelphia	W 137–134	Jamal Murray (31)	Nikola Jokić (9)	Nikola Jokić (13)	Wells Fargo Center; 19,764	29–19

February: 10–2 (home: 6–1; road: 4–1)

Game	Date	Team	Score	High points	High rebounds	High assists	Location Attendance	Record
49	February 1	@ Charlotte	W 107–104	Nikola Jokić (28)	Nikola Jokić (13)	Nikola Jokić (17)	Spectrum Center; 19,106	30–19
50	February 3	New Orleans	W 125–113	Michael Porter Jr. (36)	Nikola Jokić (14)	Nikola Jokić (10)	Ball Arena; 19,587	31–19
51	February 5	New Orleans	W 144–119	Michael Porter Jr. (39)	Michael Porter Jr. (12)	Aaron Gordon (12)	Ball Arena; 19,526	32–19
52	February 6	Orlando	W 112–90	Michael Porter Jr. (30)	Nikola Jokić (10)	Nikola Jokić (12)	Ball Arena; 19,616	33–19
53	February 8	@ Phoenix	W 122–105	Jamal Murray (30)	Jokić, Jordan (11)	Nikola Jokić (9)	Footprint Center; 17,071	34–19
54	February 10	Portland	W 146–117	Nikola Jokić (40)	Nikola Jokić (7)	Jalen Pickett (9)	Ball Arena; 19,535	35–19
55	February 12	Portland	W 132–121	Jamal Murray (55)	Nikola Jokić (15)	Nikola Jokić (10)	Ball Arena; 19,901	36–19
All-Star Game
56	February 20	Charlotte	W 129–115	Jamal Murray (34)	Nikola Jokic (17)	Nikola Jokic (9)	Ball Arena; 19,870	37–19
57	February 22	L.A. Lakers	L 100–123	Aaron Gordon (24)	Nikola Jokić (13)	Nikola Jokić (10)	Ball Arena; 19,998	37–20
58	February 24	@ Indiana	W 125–116	Aaron Gordon (25)	Michael Porter Jr. (11)	Nikola Jokić (19)	Gainbridge Fieldhouse; 16,549	38–20
59	February 27	@ Milwaukee	L 112–121	Nikola Jokić (32)	Nikola Jokić (14)	Nikola Jokić (10)	Fiserv Forum; 17,566	38–21
60	February 28	@ Detroit	W 134–119	Jamal Murray (31)	Nikola Jokić (17)	Nikola Jokić (15)	Little Caesars Arena; 20,062	39–21

March: 8–7 (home: 5–3; road: 3–4)

Game	Date	Team	Score	High points	High rebounds	High assists	Location Attendance	Record
61	March 2	@ Boston	L 103–110	Jamal Murray (26)	Nikola Jokić (14)	Nikola Jokić (9)	TD Garden; 19,156	39–22
62	March 5	Sacramento	W 116–110	Russell Westbrook (25)	Nikola Jokić (15)	Jamal Murray (8)	Ball Arena; 19,618	40–22
63	March 7	Phoenix	W 149–141 (OT)	Nikola Jokić (31)	Nikola Jokić (21)	Nikola Jokić (22)	Ball Arena; 19,808	41–22
64	March 9	@ Oklahoma City	L 103–127	Jokić, Porter Jr. (24)	Michael Porter Jr. (15)	Nikola Jokić (9)	Paycom Center; 18,203	41–23
65	March 10	@ Oklahoma City	W 140–127	Nikola Jokić (35)	Nikola Jokić (18)	Nikola Jokić (8)	Paycom Center; 18,203	42–23
66	March 12	Minnesota	L 95–115	Nikola Jokić (34)	Michael Porter Jr. (9)	Jamal Murray (8)	Ball Arena; 19,832	42–24
67	March 14	L.A. Lakers	W 131–126	Nikola Jokić (28)	Jokić, Gordon (7)	Russell Westbrook (7)	Ball Arena; 19,946	43–24
68	March 15	Washington	L 123–126	Nikola Jokić (40)	Nikola Jokić (13)	Russell Westbrook (11)	Ball Arena; 19,833	43–25
69	March 17	@ Golden State	W 114–105	Aaron Gordon (38)	Russell Westbrook (12)	Russell Westbrook (16)	Chase Center; 18,064	44–25
70	March 19	@ L.A. Lakers	L 108–120	Aaron Gordon (26)	Aaron Gordon (11)	Russell Westbrook (9)	Crypto.com Arena; 18,997	44–26
71	March 21	@ Portland	L 109–128	Aaron Gordon (23)	Braun, Porter Jr., Watson (5)	Jalen Pickett (5)	Moda Center; 17,410	44–27
72	March 23	@ Houston	W 116–111	Jamal Murray (39)	DeAndre Jordan (15)	Aaron Gordon (8)	Toyota Center; 18,055	45–27
73	March 24	Chicago	L 119–129	Jamal Murray (28)	DeAndre Jordan (17)	Russell Westbrook (10)	Ball Arena; 19,816	45–28
74	March 26	Milwaukee	W 127–117	Nikola Jokić (39)	Braun, Jokić, Porter Jr. (10)	Nikola Jokić (10)	Ball Arena; 19,641	46–28
75	March 28	Utah	W 129–93	Nikola Jokić (27)	Nikola Jokić (14)	Russell Westbrook (7)	Ball Arena; 19,905	47–28

April : 3–4 (home: 1–3; road: 2–1)

Game	Date	Team	Score	High points	High rebounds	High assists	Location Attendance	Record
76	April 1	Minnesota	L 139–140 (2OT)	Nikola Jokić (61)	Christian Braun (12)	Nikola Jokić (10)	Ball Arena; 19,927	47–29
77	April 2	San Antonio	L 106–113	Russell Westbrook (30)	DeAndre Jordan (17)	Jalen Pickett (10)	Ball Arena; 19,524	47–30
78	April 4	@ Golden State	L 104–118	Nikola Jokić (33)	Nikola Jokić (12)	Nikola Jokić (9)	Chase Center; 18,064	47–31
79	April 6	Indiana	L 120–125	Nikola Jokić (41)	Nikola Jokić (15)	Nikola Jokić (13)	Ball Arena; 19,932	47–32
80	April 9	@ Sacramento	W 124–116	Christian Braun (25)	Nikola Jokić (12)	Nikola Jokić (11)	Golden 1 Center; 16,161	48–32
81	April 11	Memphis	W 117–109	Aaron Gordon (33)	Nikola Jokić (16)	Nikola Jokic (13)	Ball Arena; 20,015	49–32
82	April 13	@ Houston	W 126–111	Michael Porter Jr. (19)	five players (7)	Nikola Jokić (7)	Toyota Center; 18,055	50–32

2024–25 season schedule

=== Playoffs ===
2025 playoff game log
Total: 7–7 (home: 5–2; road: 2–5)
First Round: 4–3 (home: 3–1; road: 1–2)

Game	Date	Team	Score	High points	High rebounds	High assists	Location Attendance	Series
1	April 19	L.A. Clippers	W 112–110 (OT)	Nikola Jokić (29)	Jokić, Murray (9)	Nikola Jokić (12)	Ball Arena; 19,973	1–0
2	April 21	L.A. Clippers	L 102–105	Nikola Jokić (26)	Michael Porter Jr. (15)	Nikola Jokić (10)	Ball Arena; 19,989	1–1
3	April 24	@ L.A. Clippers	L 83–117	Jokić, Murray (23)	Nikola Jokić (13)	Nikola Jokić (13)	Intuit Dome; 17,927	1–2
4	April 26	@ L.A. Clippers	W 101–99	Nikola Jokić (36)	Nikola Jokić (21)	Nikola Jokić (8)	Intuit Dome; 17,927	2–2
5	April 29	L.A. Clippers	W 131–115	Jamal Murray (43)	Christian Braun (12)	Nikola Jokić (12)	Ball Arena; 20,005	3–2
6	May 1	@ L.A. Clippers	L 105–111	Nikola Jokić (25)	Russell Westbrook (10)	Jokić, Murray (8)	Intuit Dome; 17,927	3–3
7	May 3	L.A. Clippers	W 120–101	Aaron Gordon (22)	Nikola Jokić (10)	Nikola Jokić (9)	Ball Arena; 19,995	4–3

Conference Semifinals: 3–4 (home: 2–1; road: 1–3)

Game	Date	Team	Score	High points	High rebounds	High assists	Location Attendance	Series
1	May 5	@ Oklahoma City	W 121–119	Nikola Jokić (42)	Nikola Jokić (22)	Jokić, Murray (6)	Paycom Center; 18,203	1–0
2	May 7	@ Oklahoma City	L 106–149	Russell Westbrook (19)	Nikola Jokić (8)	Nikola Jokić (6)	Paycom Center; 18,203	1–1
3	May 9	Oklahoma City	W 113–104 (OT)	Jamal Murray (27)	Nikola Jokić (16)	Jamal Murray (8)	Ball Arena; 19,993	2–1
4	May 11	Oklahoma City	L 87–92	Nikola Jokić (27)	Aaron Gordon (16)	Aaron Gordon (6)	Ball Arena; 19,995	2–2
5	May 13	@ Oklahoma City	L 105–112	Nikola Jokić (44)	Nikola Jokić (15)	Nikola Jokić (5)	Paycom Center; 18,203	2–3
6	May 15	Oklahoma City	W 119–107	Nikola Jokić (29)	Nikola Jokić (14)	Nikola Jokić (8)	Ball Arena; 19,998	3–3
7	May 18	@ Oklahoma City	L 93–125	Nikola Jokić (20)	Aaron Gordon (11)	Nikola Jokić (7)	Paycom Center; 18,203	3–4

2025 playoff schedule

=== NBA Cup ===
The groups were revealed during the tournament announcement on July 12, 2024.

==== West Group C ====
Pos	Team	Pld	W	L	PF	PA	PD	Qualification
1	Golden State Warriors	4	3	1	470	462	+8	Advance to knockout stage
2	Dallas Mavericks	4	3	1	493	447	+46	Advance to knockout stage
3	Denver Nuggets	4	2	2	455	449	+6	
4	Memphis Grizzlies	4	1	3	464	475	−11	
5	New Orleans Pelicans	4	1	3	409	458	−49	

Source: NBA
Rules for classification: Tiebreakers

== Player statistics ==
Legend
GP	Games played	GS	Games started	MPG	Minutes per game
FG%	Field-goal percentage	3P%	3-point field-goal percentage	FT%	Free-throw percentage
RPG	Rebounds per game	APG	Assists per game	SPG	Steals per game
BPG	Blocks per game	PPG	Points per game

=== Regular season ===
Denver Nuggets statistics
Player	GP	GS	MPG	FG%	3P%	FT%	RPG	APG	SPG	BPG	PPG
Trey Alexander	24	0	4.9	.317	.176	.750	.5	.5	.1	.0	1.3
Christian Braun	79	77	33.9	.580	.397	.827	5.2	2.6	1.1	.5	15.4
Vlatko Čančar	13	0	10.4	.385	.267	—	2.5	.7	.2	.2	1.8
Aaron Gordon	51	42	28.4	.531	.436	.810	4.8	3.2	.5	.3	14.7
PJ Hall	19	0	3.5	.583	.250	.750	1.2	.2	.0	.2	1.7
Nikola Jokić	70	70	36.7	.576	.417	.800	12.7	10.2	1.8	.6	29.6
Spencer Jones	20	0	6.2	.324	.059	1.000	.9	.3	.3	.3	1.3
DeAndre Jordan	56	5	12.3	.650	—	.422	5.1	.9	.3	.5	3.7
Jamal Murray	67	67	36.1	.474	.393	.886	3.9	6.0	1.4	.5	21.4
Zeke Nnaji	57	4	10.7	.496	.327	.614	1.6	.4	.4	.7	3.2
Jalen Pickett	49	4	13.6	.428	.396	.750	1.4	2.2	.4	.1	4.1
Michael Porter Jr.	77	77	33.7	.504	.395	.768	7.0	2.1	.6	.5	18.2
Dario Šarić	16	4	13.1	.362	.269	.700	3.1	1.4	.4	.1	3.5
Julian Strawther	65	4	21.3	.432	.349	.822	2.2	1.3	.6	.2	9.0
Hunter Tyson	51	2	7.8	.375	.311	.750	1.5	.4	.2	.1	2.6
Peyton Watson	68	18	24.3	.477	.353	.693	3.4	1.4	.7	1.4	8.1
Russell Westbrook	75	36	27.9	.449	.323	.661	4.9	6.1	1.4	.5	13.3

=== Playoffs ===
Denver Nuggets statistics
Player	GP	GS	MPG	FG%	3P%	FT%	RPG	APG	SPG	BPG	PPG
Christian Braun	14	14	38.9	.453	.300	.710	6.4	2.4	1.2	.7	12.6
Vlatko Čančar	3	0	3.7	–	–	–	.7	.0	.0	.0	.0
Aaron Gordon	14	14	37.3	.485	.379	.860	7.6	2.7	.6	.4	16.2
Nikola Jokić	14	14	40.2	.489	.380	.772	12.7	8.0	2.0	.9	26.2
DeAndre Jordan	7	0	5.1	1.000	–	.000	1.3	.3	.0	.1	.9
Jamal Murray	14	14	41.3	.444	.354	.875	4.9	5.2	1.2	.8	21.8
Zeke Nnaji	6	0	5.7	.125	.167	.571	1.2	.3	.2	.3	1.2
Jalen Pickett	8	0	7.1	.333	.333	–	.9	.6	.0	.1	1.6
Michael Porter Jr.	14	14	31.1	.392	.343	.714	5.5	.6	.6	.4	9.1
Julian Strawther	9	0	9.8	.433	.500	.857	1.0	.2	.2	.1	4.2
Hunter Tyson	5	0	6.0	.500	.200	1.000	1.6	.4	.2	.0	3.0
Peyton Watson	14	0	14.2	.407	.368	.500	2.9	.3	.8	.6	4.5
Russell Westbrook	13	0	24.1	.391	.317	.700	3.7	2.6	.9	.1	11.7

== Transactions ==
=== Trades ===
June 26, 2024
To Denver Nuggets

Draft rights to DaRon Holmes II (No. 22)
To Phoenix Suns

Draft rights to Ryan Dunn (No. 28)
Draft rights to Kevin McCullar Jr. (No. 56)
2026 DEN second-round pick
2031 DEN second-round pick
July 6, 2024
Six-team trade
To Denver Nuggets

- 2025 PHI second-round pick (Note: As part of the trade, Charlotte sent Philadelphia's pick to Denver, which then sent the more favorable of Philadelphia's pick and its own pick to Dallas and the less favorable of the two to Minnesota.) (from Charlotte)
- Cash considerations (from Charlotte)
To Charlotte Hornets

- Josh Green (from Dallas)
- Reggie Jackson (from Denver)
- 2029 DEN second-round pick (from Denver)
- 2030 DEN second-round pick (from Denver)
To Dallas Mavericks

- Klay Thompson (sign-and-trade) (from Golden State)
- 2025 second-round pick (from Denver)
To Golden State Warriors

- Kyle Anderson (sign-and-trade) (from Minnesota)
- Buddy Hield (sign-and-trade) (from Philadelphia)
To Minnesota Timberwolves

- 2025 second-round pick (from Denver)
- 2031 second-round pick swap right (from Golden State)
- Cash considerations (from Golden State)
To Philadelphia 76ers

- 2031 DAL second-round pick (from Dallas)

=== Free agency ===
==== Re-signed ====
Date	Player	Signed	Ref.
July 9, 2024	Vlatko Čančar	1-year, $2 million	
July 24, 2024	DeAndre Jordan	1-year, $2 million	
September 7, 2024	Jamal Murray	4-year, $208 million extension	
October 21, 2024	Aaron Gordon	4-year, $133 million extension	

==== Additions ====
Date	Player	Signed	Former team	Ref.
July 9	Trey Alexander	Two-way Contract	Creighton	
July 9	PJ Hall	Two-way Contract	Clemson	
July 12	Dario Šarić	2-year, $10.5 million	Golden State Warriors	
July 26	Russell Westbrook	2-year, $6.8 million	Los Angeles Clippers	
July 30	Spencer Jones	Two-way Contract	Stanford	

==== Subtractions ====
Date	Player	Reason left	New team	Ref.
July 2, 2024	Collin Gillespie	Free Agent	Phoenix Suns	
July 6, 2024	Kentavious Caldwell-Pope	Free Agent	Orlando Magic	
July 24, 2024	Jay Huff	Free Agent	Memphis Grizzlies	
October 12, 2024	Braxton Key	Free Agent	Los Angeles Clippers	
February 1, 2025	Justin Holiday	Contract Expired	(Italy) Virtus Bologna	
