= Christian Braun =

American basketball player (born 2001)

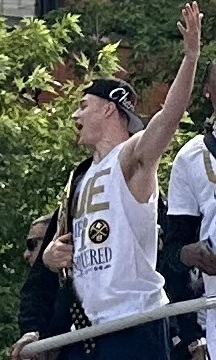
- Braun after winning the 2023 NBA Finals

No. 0 – Denver Nuggets
- Position: Shooting guard
- League: NBA

Personal information
- Born: April 17, 2001 (age 25) Burlington, Kansas, U.S.
- Listed height: 6 ft 6 in (1.98 m)
- Listed weight: 220 lb (100 kg)

Career information
- High school: Blue Valley Northwest (Overland Park, Kansas)
- College: Kansas (2019–2022)
- NBA draft: 2022: 1st round, 21st overall pick
- Drafted by: Denver Nuggets
- Playing career: 2022–present

Career history
- 2022–present: Denver Nuggets

Career highlights
- NBA champion (2023); NCAA champion (2022); Second-team All-Big 12 (2022); Big 12 All-Freshman Team (2020); Mr. Kansas Basketball (2019)
- Stats at NBA.com
- Stats at Basketball Reference

Christian Nicholas Braun (/braʊn/ BROWN; born April 17, 2001) is an American professional basketball player for the Denver Nuggets of the National Basketball Association (NBA). He plays the shooting guard position.

A Kansas native, Braun won Mr. Kansas Basketball in 2019 and played collegiately for the Kansas Jayhawks. Braun started for the Jayhawks squad that won the 2022 NCAA Division I championship.

In the 2022 NBA draft, Braun was selected 21st overall by the Denver Nuggets. During his rookie season in Denver, the Nuggets defeated the Miami Heat and won their first NBA championship. Braun is the fifth player in basketball history to win an NCAA title and an NBA title in consecutive years.

== High school career ==
Braun played basketball for Blue Valley Northwest High School in Overland Park, Kansas. As a senior, he averaged 27.8 points, 9.3 rebounds and 3.8 assists per game, leading the Huskies to a third straight Class 6A state title. He was named Mr. Kansas Basketball and Kansas Gatorade Player of the Year. He committed to playing college basketball for Kansas over offers from Kansas State, Illinois and Missouri, among others.

On April 4, 2022, the school declared that day Christian Braun Day.

== College career ==
As a freshman at the University of Kansas, Braun averaged 5.3 points and 2.9 rebounds per game, earning Big 12 All-Freshman Team honors. On November 27, 2020, he recorded a career-high 30 points, nine rebounds and four steals in a 94–72 win over Saint Joseph's.

As a sophomore, Braun averaged 9.7 points and 5.2 rebounds per game.

He was named to the Second Team All-Big 12 as a junior. In the Final Four against Villanova, he became the 65th player to reach 1,000 points for Kansas, finishing that game with 10 points and helping the Jayhawks reach the championship. In the championship game against the North Carolina Tar Heels, he had 12 points and 12 rebounds for his fifth double-double of the season, which helped Kansas rally from a 40–25 halftime deficit. In the final possession of that game, he defended Caleb Love's three-point attempt, sealing the win and giving his team an NCAA title.

On April 24, 2022, Braun declared for the 2022 NBA draft, while maintaining his college eligibility. On May 25, 2022, he confirmed he would remain in the NBA draft and forego his senior season.

== Professional career ==
=== Denver Nuggets (2022–present) ===
Braun was picked by the Denver Nuggets with the 21st overall pick in the 2022 NBA draft. On July 3, 2022, he signed his rookie scale contract with the Nuggets. He averaged 4.7 points per game in the 2022-23 NBA season. Braun won his first championship with the Nuggets after they defeated the Miami Heat in the 2023 NBA Finals. He became the fifth player in NBA history to win an NCAA and NBA championship in back-to-back seasons; the other four are Bill Russell, Henry Bibby, Magic Johnson and Billy Thompson.

Braun played in all 82 games for the Nuggets during the 2023-24 NBA season, averaging 7.3 points per game.

Braun became the Nuggets' starting shooting guard before the 2024-25 NBA season began. He made 79 appearances (77 starts) for Denver that season, averaging 15.4 points, 5.2 rebounds, and 2.6 assists per game.

On October 20, 2025, Braun and the Nuggets agreed to a five-year, $125 million contract extension. On November 17, Braun was ruled out for at least six weeks due to a left ankle sprain suffered during a game against the Los Angeles Clippers. He made 44 appearances for Denver during the 2025–26 season, averaging 12.0 points, 4.8 rebounds, and 2.7 assists.

== Career statistics ==
Legend
GP	Games played	GS	Games started	MPG	Minutes per game
FG%	Field goal percentage	3P%	3-point field goal percentage	FT%	Free throw percentage
RPG	Rebounds per game	APG	Assists per game	SPG	Steals per game
BPG	Blocks per game	PPG	Points per game	**Bold**	Career high
†	Won an NBA championship

=== NBA ===
==== Regular season ====
Year	Team	GP	GS	MPG	FG%	3P%	FT%	RPG	APG	SPG	BPG	PPG
2022–23^{†}	Denver	76	6	15.5	.495	.354	.625	2.4	.8	.5	.2	4.7
2023–24	Denver	**82**	4	20.2	.460	.384	.694	3.7	1.6	.5	.4	7.3
2024–25	Denver	79	**77**	**33.9**	**.580**	**.397**	**.827**	**5.2**	2.6	**1.1**	**.5**	**15.4**
2025–26	Denver	44	44	31.8	.519	.301	.782	4.8	**2.7**	.7	.3	12.0
Career		281	131	24.6	.526	.365	.758	3.9	1.8	.7	.4	9.6

==== Playoffs ====
Year	Team	GP	GS	MPG	FG%	3P%	FT%	RPG	APG	SPG	BPG	PPG
2023^{†}	Denver	**19**	0	13.0	**.533**	.200	.579	2.1	.6	.6	.2	3.2
2024	Denver	12	0	17.0	.426	.222	.688	2.7	.8	.2	.4	5.1
2025	Denver	14	**14**	**38.9**	.453	.300	.710	**6.4**	**2.4**	**1.2**	.7	**12.6**
2026	Denver	6	6	31.2	.417	**.429**	**.737**	3.5	1.7	1.0	**.8**	8.3
Career		51	20	23.2	.456	.295	.682	3.6	1.3	.7	.5	6.8

=== College ===
Year	Team	GP	GS	MPG	FG%	3P%	FT%	RPG	APG	SPG	BPG	PPG
2019–20	Kansas	31	5	18.4	.431	.444	.731	2.9	.5	.7	.2	5.3
2020–21	Kansas	30	30	31.2	.380	.340	**.786**	5.2	1.9	**1.2**	.4	9.7
2021–22	Kansas	40	39	34.4	**.495**	**.386**	.733	**6.5**	**2.8**	1.0	**.8**	**14.1**
Career		101	74	28.5	.449	.378	.749	5.0	1.8	1.0	.5	10.1

== Personal life ==
Braun has two brothers, one older and one younger. His uncle played college basketball at Missouri. His older brother, Parker, played at Kansas during the 2023-24 season. Braun's father Donny was a former walk-on at Kansas, while his mother, along with her older sister, also played at Missouri. His mother's family was inducted into the Missouri Sports Hall of Fame.

Braun has launched a fashion line, The CB2 Collection.
