= 2025–26 Miami Heat season =

2025–26 NBA season by team

- Head coach: Erik Spoelstra
- President: Pat Riley
- General manager: Andy Elisburg
- Owner: Micky Arison
- Arena: Kaseya Center

Results
- Record: 43–39 (.524)
- Place: Division: 4th (Southeast); Conference: 10th (Eastern)
- Playoff finish: Did not qualify
- Stats at Basketball Reference

Local media
- Television: FanDuel Sports Network Sun; WPLG (12 simulcasts)
- Radio: WQAM

The 2025–26 Miami Heat season was the 38th season for the franchise in the National Basketball Association (NBA).

The Heat advanced to the 2025 NBA Cup knockout stage as the East wildcard by having the highest point differential among second-place teams in the conference, following a 3–1 group stage record and a head-to-head tiebreaker loss to the eventual Cup (and NBA) champions New York Knicks for East Group C. However, they were eliminated by the Orlando Magic in the quarterfinals.

During the March 10, 2026 game against the Washington Wizards, forward/center Bam Adebayo scored 83 points, surpassing Kobe Bryant's record for the second most points scored in a single NBA game behind Wilt Chamberlain's 100-point game. Two days later, the Heat surpassed their win total from the previous season with a win over the Milwaukee Bucks. They eventually finished the regular season with a 43–39 record, placing tenth in the East.

For the fourth consecutive season, the Heat qualified for the play-in tournament. However, they lost in the first stage of the tournament to the Charlotte Hornets in overtime, missing the playoffs for the first time since 2019.

== Draft ==
Round	Pick	Player	Position(s)	Nationality	College
1	20	Kasparas Jakučionis	Point Guard	Lithuania	Illinois

The Heat entered the draft with a single first-round pick, which was acquired from the Golden State Warriors via trade in the previous season as an exchange for forward Jimmy Butler, which conveyed after falling outside the top 10 when Golden State qualified for the 2025 NBA playoffs. Their original first-round pick was conveyed to the Oklahoma City Thunder per a 2022 trade, as Miami’s qualification for the playoffs removed the pick's lottery protection. Meanwhile, the Heat had traded their second-round pick to the Indiana Pacers in 2019, which would end up with Golden State through subsequent trades after landing outside the Top-37 protection set upon acquisition from the Brooklyn Nets in 2024.

== Roster ==
2025–26 Miami Heat roster
Players

Pos.	No.	Player	Height	Weight	DOB	From
F/C	13	Bam Adebayo	6 ft 9 in (2.06 m)	260 lb (118 kg)	1997-07-18	Kentucky
F	0	Simone Fontecchio	6 ft 7 in (2.01 m)	220 lb (100 kg)	1995-12-09	Italy
F	15	Myron Gardner	6 ft 5 in (1.96 m)	225 lb (102 kg)	2001-05-21	Little Rock
C	50	Vladislav Goldin (TW)	7 ft 0 in (2.13 m)	255 lb (116 kg)	2001-05-12	Michigan
G	14	Tyler Herro	6 ft 5 in (1.96 m)	205 lb (93 kg)	2000-01-20	Kentucky
G	25	Kasparas Jakučionis	6 ft 5 in (1.96 m)	205 lb (93 kg)	2006-05-29	Illinois
F	11	Jaime Jaquez Jr.	6 ft 6 in (1.98 m)	230 lb (104 kg)	2001-02-18	UCLA
F	16	Keshad Johnson	6 ft 6 in (1.98 m)	230 lb (104 kg)	2001-06-23	Arizona
F	5	Nikola Jović (injured)	6 ft 10 in (2.08 m)	240 lb (109 kg)	2003-06-09	Serbia
G	8	Trevor Keels (TW)	6 ft 5 in (1.96 m)	215 lb (98 kg)	2003-08-26	Duke
G	9	Pelle Larsson	6 ft 5 in (1.96 m)	215 lb (98 kg)	2001-02-23	Arizona
G	45	Davion Mitchell	6 ft 0 in (1.83 m)	210 lb (95 kg)	1998-09-05	Baylor
G	24	Norman Powell	6 ft 4 in (1.93 m)	215 lb (98 kg)	1993-05-25	UCLA
G	12	Dru Smith (injured)	6 ft 2 in (1.88 m)	200 lb (91 kg)	1997-12-30	Missouri
C	7	Kel'el Ware	7 ft 0 in (2.13 m)	250 lb (113 kg)	2004-04-20	Indiana
F	22	Andrew Wiggins	6 ft 7 in (2.01 m)	210 lb (95 kg)	1995-02-23	Kansas
G	17	Jahmir Young	6 ft 0 in (1.83 m)	185 lb (84 kg)	2000-10-07	Maryland

Coaches
Head coach
- Erik Spoelstra
Assistant(s)
- Malik Allen
- Caron Butler
- Octavio De La Grana
- Wayne Ellington
- Eric Glass
- Chris Quinn

Legend
- (DP) Unsigned draft pick
- (FA) Free agent
- (S) Suspended
- (GL) On assignment to G League affiliate
- (TW) Two-way affiliate player
- Injured

Roster
Updated: April 10, 2026

== Standings ==
=== Division ===
Southeast Division	W	L	PCT	GB	Home	Road	Div	GP
y – Atlanta Hawks	46	36	.561	–	24‍–‍17	22‍–‍19	9‍–‍7	82
x – Orlando Magic	45	37	.549	1.0	26‍–‍16	19‍–‍21	9‍–‍8	82
pi – Charlotte Hornets	44	38	.537	2.0	21‍–‍20	23‍–‍18	11‍–‍5	82
pi – Miami Heat	43	39	.524	3.0	26‍–‍15	17‍–‍24	10‍–‍7	82
Washington Wizards	17	65	.207	29.0	11‍–‍30	6‍–‍35	2‍–‍14	82

=== Conference ===
Eastern Conference
#	Team	W	L	PCT	GB	GP
1	c – Detroit Pistons *	60	22	.732	–	82
2	y – Boston Celtics *	56	26	.683	4.0	82
3	x – New York Knicks	53	29	.646	7.0	82
4	x – Cleveland Cavaliers	52	30	.634	8.0	82
5	x – Toronto Raptors	46	36	.561	14.0	82
6	y – Atlanta Hawks *	46	36	.561	14.0	82
7	x – Philadelphia 76ers	45	37	.549	15.0	82
8	x – Orlando Magic	45	37	.549	15.0	82
9	pi – Charlotte Hornets	44	38	.537	16.0	82
10	pi – Miami Heat	43	39	.524	17.0	82
11	Milwaukee Bucks	32	50	.390	28.0	82
12	Chicago Bulls	31	51	.378	29.0	82
13	Brooklyn Nets	20	62	.244	40.0	82
14	Indiana Pacers	19	63	.232	41.0	82
15	Washington Wizards	17	65	.207	43.0	82

== Game log ==
=== Preseason ===
2025 preseason game log
Total: 0–6 (Home: 0–4; Road: 0–2)
Preseason: 0–6 (home: 0–4; road: 0–2)

Game	Date	Team	Score	High points	High rebounds	High assists	Location Attendance	Record
1	October 4	Orlando	L 118–126	Trevor Keels (12)	Kel'el Ware (9)	Ethan Thompson (6)	(Puerto Rico) Coliseo José Miguel Agrelot; 15,470	0–1
2	October 6	Milwaukee	L 93–103	Powell, Ware (18)	Kel'el Ware (13)	Nikola Jović (7)	Kaseya Center; 19,600	0–2
3	October 8	San Antonio	L 107–112	Kel'el Ware (29)	Kel'el Ware (12)	Kasparas Jakučionis (10)	Kaseya Center; 19,600	0–3
4	October 12	@ Orlando	L 104–120	Kel'el Ware (24)	Kel'el Ware (10)	Johnson, Larsson (3)	Kia Center; 18,846	0–4
5	October 13	@ Atlanta	L 118–119 (OT)	Jaquez Jr., Powell, Thompson (17)	Kel'el Ware (11)	Adebayo, Jaquez Jr., Johnson, Larsson (3)	State Farm Arena; 12,713	0–5
6	October 17	Memphis	L 125–141	Adebayo, Powell (23)	Kel'el Ware (14)	Jaquez Jr., Powell (6)	Kaseya Center; 19,600	0–6

2025–26 preseason schedule

=== Regular season ===
2025–26 game log
Total: 43–39 (Home: 26–15; Road: 17–24)
October: 3–2 (home: 2–0; road: 1–2)

Game	Date	Team	Score	High points	High rebounds	High assists	Location Attendance	Record
1	October 22	@ Orlando	L 121–125	Norman Powell (28)	Bam Adebayo (12)	Davion Mitchell (12)	Kia Center; 19,186	0−1
2	October 24	@ Memphis	W 146–114	Bam Adebayo (24)	Jaime Jaquez Jr. (10)	Davion Mitchell (7)	FedExForum; 14,641	1–1
3	October 26	New York	W 115–107	Norman Powell (29)	Bam Adebayo (13)	Davion Mitchell (6)	Kaseya Center; 19,600	2–1
4	October 28	Charlotte	W 144–117	Jaime Jaquez Jr. (28)	Kel'el Ware (9)	Davion Mitchell (9)	Kaseya Center; 19,600	3–1
5	October 30	@ San Antonio	L 101–107	Bam Adebayo (31)	Bam Adebayo (10)	Jaquez Jr. (6)	Frost Bank Center; 18,702	3–2

November: 10–5 (home: 7–2; road: 3–3)

Game	Date	Team	Score	High points	High rebounds	High assists	Location Attendance	Record
6	November 2	@ L.A. Lakers	L 120–130	Jaime Jaquez Jr. (31)	Andrew Wiggins (9)	Davion Mitchell (8)	Crypto.com Arena; 18,831	3–3
7	November 3	@ L.A. Clippers	W 120–119	Bam Adebayo (25)	Bam Adebayo (10)	Davion Mitchell (9)	Intuit Dome; 17,045	4–3
8	November 5	@ Denver	L 112–122	Norman Powell (23)	Kel'el Ware (13)	Davion Mitchell (9)	Ball Arena; 19,862	4–4
9	November 7	Charlotte	W 126–108	Norman Powell (25)	Jaime Jaquez Jr. (8)	Jaime Jaquez Jr. (9)	Kaseya Center; 19,600	5–4
10	November 8	Portland	W 136–131	Nikola Jović (29)	Jaquez Jr., Ware (12)	Jaquez Jr., Jović, Mitchell (7)	Kaseya Center; 19,600	6–4
11	November 10	Cleveland	W 140–138 (OT)	Norman Powell (33)	Kel'el Ware (19)	Davion Mitchell (8)	Kaseya Center; 19,600	7–4
12	November 12	Cleveland	L 116–130	Norman Powell (27)	Kel'el Ware (13)	Andrew Wiggins (6)	Kaseya Center; 19,600	7–5
13	November 14	@ New York	L 132–140	Norman Powell (38)	Kel'el Ware (10)	Davion Mitchell (10)	Madison Square Garden; 19,812	7–6
14	November 17	New York	W 115–113	Norman Powell (19)	Kel'el Ware (14)	Davion Mitchell (5)	Kaseya Center; 19,600	8–6
15	November 19	Golden State	W 110–96	Norman Powell (25)	Kel'el Ware (16)	Jaime Jaquez Jr. (7)	Kaseya Center; 19,600	9–6
16	November 21	@ Chicago	W 143–107	Kel'el Ware (20)	Kel'el Ware (14)	Jaquez Jr., Larsson (7)	United Center; 21,313	10–6
17	November 23	@ Philadelphia	W 127–117	Norman Powell (32)	Kel'el Ware (16)	Davion Mitchell (12)	Xfinity Mobile Arena; 18,850	11–6
18	November 24	Dallas	W 106–102	Tyler Herro (24)	Kel'el Ware (18)	Pelle Larsson (6)	Kaseya Center; 19,600	12–6
19	November 26	Milwaukee	W 106–103	Tyler Herro (29)	Bam Adebayo (11)	Davion Mitchell (9)	Kaseya Center; 19,600	13–6
20	November 29	Detroit	L 135–138	Andrew Wiggins (31)	Bam Adebayo (10)	Davion Mitchell (10)	Kaseya Center; 19,600	13–7

December: 5–8 (home: 3–3; road: 2–5)

Game	Date	Team	Score	High points	High rebounds	High assists	Location Attendance	Record
21	December 1	L.A. Clippers	W 140–123	Norman Powell (30)	Bam Adebayo (14)	Davion Mitchell (12)	Kaseya Center; 19,600	14–7
22	December 3	@ Dallas	L 108–118	Kel'el Ware (22)	Kel'el Ware (10)	Davion Mitchell (9)	American Airlines Center; 19,509	14–8
23	December 5	@ Orlando	L 105–106	Norman Powell (28)	Bam Adebayo (15)	Davion Mitchell (7)	Kia Center; 17,794	14–9
24	December 6	Sacramento	L 111–127	Jaime Jaquez Jr. (27)	Adebayo, Fontecchio (7)	Jaquez Jr., Jović (6)	Kaseya Center; 19,700	14–10
25	December 9	@ Orlando	L 108–117	Norman Powell (21)	Bam Adebayo (8)	Davion Mitchell (9)	Kia Center; 18,605	14–11
26	December 15	Toronto	L 96–106	Adebayo, Powell (20)	Kel'el Ware (13)	Tied (4)	Kaseya Center; 19,600	14–12
27	December 18	@ Brooklyn	W 106–95	Norman Powell (24)	Bam Adebayo (17)	Davion Mitchell (7)	Barclays Center; 17,548	15–12
28	December 19	@ Boston	L 116–129	Kel'el Ware (24)	Kel'el Ware (14)	Tied (4)	TD Garden; 19,156	15–13
29	December 21	@ New York	L 125–132	Kel'el Ware (28)	Kel'el Ware (20)	Davion Mitchell (8)	Madison Square Garden; 19,812	15–14
30	December 23	Toronto	L 91–112	Jaime Jaquez Jr. (21)	Bam Adebayo (12)	Norman Powell (6)	Kaseya Center; 19,801	15–15
31	December 26	@ Atlanta	W 126–111	Norman Powell (25)	Kel'el Ware (13)	Davion Mitchell (6)	State Farm Arena; 15,664	16–15
32	December 27	Indiana	W 142–116	Jaquez Jr., Wiggins (28)	Jović, Ware (7)	Jović, Larsson (7)	Kaseya Center; 19,715	17–15
33	December 29	Denver	W 147–123	Norman Powell (25)	Bam Adebayo (10)	Jaime Jaquez Jr. (11)	Kaseya Center; 20,047	18–15

January: 8–9 (home: 3–4; road: 5–5)

Game	Date	Team	Score	High points	High rebounds	High assists	Location Attendance	Record
34	January 1	@ Detroit	W 118–112	Norman Powell (36)	Bam Adebayo (14)	Davion Mitchell (11)	Little Caesars Arena; 20,062	19–15
35	January 3	Minnesota	L 115–125	Norman Powell (21)	Bam Adebayo (9)	Davion Mitchell (6)	Kaseya Center; 19,893	19–16
36	January 4	New Orleans	W 125–106	Norman Powell (34)	Kel'el Ware (12)	Tied (6)	Kaseya Center; 19,600	20–16
37	January 6	@ Minnesota	L 94–122	Norman Powell (21)	Adebayo, Ware (11)	Davion Mitchell (9)	Target Center; 17,023	20–17
—	January 8	@ Chicago	Postponed due to condensation on the court, rescheduled to January 29.					
38	January 10	@ Indiana	L 99–123	Tyler Herro (21)	Bam Adebayo (9)	Herro, Smith (4)	Gainbridge Fieldhouse; 17,274	20–18
39	January 11	@ Oklahoma City	L 112–124	Andrew Wiggins (23)	Bam Adebayo (14)	Davion Mitchell (10)	Paycom Center; 18,203	20–19
40	January 13	Phoenix	W 127–121	Bam Adebayo (29)	Bam Adebayo (9)	Jaime Jaquez Jr. (8)	Kaseya Center; 19,700	21–19
41	January 15	Boston	L 114–119	Norman Powell (26)	Andrew Wiggins (8)	Kasparas Jakučionis (8)	Kaseya Center; 19,700	21–20
42	January 17	Oklahoma City	W 122–120	Bam Adebayo (30)	Bam Adebayo (12)	Kasparas Jakučionis (7)	Kaseya Center; 19,704	22–20
43	January 19	@ Golden State	L 112–135	Norman Powell (21)	Bam Adebayo (12)	Jaime Jaquez Jr. (9)	Chase Center; 18,064	22–21
44	January 20	@ Sacramento	W 130–117	Bam Adebayo (25)	Jaime Jaquez Jr. (9)	Pelle Larsson (9)	Golden 1 Center; 11,381	23–21
45	January 22	@ Portland	L 110–127	Bam Adebayo (32)	Bam Adebayo (10)	Pelle Larsson (6)	Moda Center; 16,824	23–22
46	January 24	@ Utah	W 147–116	Bam Adebayo (26)	Bam Adebayo (15)	Powell, Wiggins (6)	Delta Center; 18,186	24–22
47	January 25	@ Phoenix	W 111–102	Bam Adebayo (22)	Powell, Wiggins (10)	Jaime Jaquez Jr. (6)	Mortgage Matchup Center; 17,071	25–22
48	January 28	Orlando	L 124–133	Simone Fontecchio (23)	Bam Adebayo (12)	Adebayo, Smith (7)	Kaseya Center; 19,700	25–23
49	January 29	@ Chicago	W 116–113	Norman Powell (21)	Bam Adebayo (12)	Jaime Jaquez Jr. (6)	United Center; 20,685	26–23
50	January 31 (Note: This game was originally scheduled for January 30, but was postponed to accommodate the January 8 game against Chicago, which was rescheduled for January 29.)	Chicago	L 118–125	Pelle Larsson (22)	Adebayo, Gardner (11)	Jaime Jaquez Jr. (7)	Kaseya Center; 19,700	26–24

February: 6–5 (home: 3–2; road: 3–3)

Game	Date	Team	Score	High points	High rebounds	High assists	Location Attendance	Record
51	February 1	Chicago	W 134–91	Adebayo, Larsson (20)	Bam Adebayo (9)	Kasparas Jakučionis (9)	Kaseya Center; 20,685	27–24
52	February 3	Atlanta	L 115–127	Jaime Jaquez Jr. (21)	Bam Adebayo (14)	Davion Mitchell (10)	Kaseya Center; 19,700	27–25
53	February 6	@ Boston	L 96–98	Andrew Wiggins (26)	Adebayo, Jaquez Jr. (7)	Jaime Jaquez Jr. (7)	TD Garden; 19,156	27–26
54	February 8	@ Washington	W 132–101	Adebayo, Jakučionis (22)	Kel'el Ware (14)	Tied (6)	Capital One Arena; 14,056	28–26
55	February 9	Utah	L 111–115	Andrew Wiggins (26)	Bam Adebayo (11)	Tied (5)	Kaseya Center; 19,700	28–27
56	February 11	@ New Orleans	W 123–111	Bam Adebayo (27)	Bam Adebayo (14)	Davion Mitchell (5)	Smoothie King Center; 16,444	29–27
All-Star Game
57	February 20	@ Atlanta	W 128–97	Tyler Herro (24)	Kel'el Ware (12)	Davion Mitchell (7)	State Farm Arena; 16,070	30–27
58	February 21	Memphis	W 136–120	Andrew Wiggins (28)	Kel'el Ware (15)	Herro, Powell (6)	Kaseya Center; 19,700	31–27
59	February 24	@ Milwaukee	L 117–128	Norman Powell (26)	Bam Adebayo (9)	Davion Mitchell (8)	Fiserv Forum; 15,459	31–28
60	February 26	@ Philadelphia	L 117–124	Bam Adebayo (29)	Bam Adebayo (14)	Tyler Herro (7)	Kaseya Center; 19,746	31–29
61	February 28	Houston	W 115–105	Bam Adebayo (24)	Kel'el Ware (15)	Davion Mitchell (5)	Kaseya Center; 19,700	32–29

March: 8–7 (home: 6–3; road: 2–4)

Game	Date	Team	Score	High points	High rebounds	High assists	Location Attendance	Record
62	March 3	Brooklyn	W 124–98	Bam Adebayo (23)	Kel'el Ware (13)	Kasparas Jakučionis (5)	Kaseya Center; 19,700	33–29
63	March 5	Brooklyn	W 126–110	Tyler Herro (25)	Kel'el Ware (11)	Jaime Jaquez Jr. (7)	Kaseya Center; 19,700	34–29
64	March 6	@ Charlotte	W 128–120	Tyler Herro (33)	Bam Adebayo (12)	Tyler Herro (9)	Spectrum Center; 19,653	35–29
65	March 8	Detroit	W 121–110	Tyler Herro (25)	Bam Adebayo (9)	Jaime Jaquez Jr. (7)	Kaseya Center; 19,700	36–29
66	March 10	Washington	W 150–129	Bam Adebayo (83)	Bam Adebayo (9)	Jaime Jaquez Jr. (8)	Kaseya Center; 19,700	37–29
67	March 12	Milwaukee	W 112–105	Pelle Larsson (28)	Kel'el Ware (13)	Jaime Jaquez Jr. (7)	Kaseya Center; 19,700	38–29
68	March 14	Orlando	L 117–121	Jaime Jaquez Jr. (22)	Kel'el Ware (10)	Jaime Jaquez Jr. (7)	Kaseya Center; 19,757	38–30
69	March 17	@ Charlotte	L 106–136	Tyler Herro (20)	Herro, Ware (8)	Jaime Jaquez Jr. (6)	Spectrum Center; 19,478	38–31
70	March 19	L.A. Lakers	L 126–134	Bam Adebayo (28)	Bam Adebayo (10)	Davion Mitchell (6)	Kaseya Center; 20,177	38–32
71	March 21	@ Houston	L 122–123	Bam Adebayo (32)	Bam Adebayo (21)	Davion Mitchell (9)	Toyota Center; 18,055	38–33
72	March 23	San Antonio	L 111–136	Norman Powell (21)	Kel'el Ware (7)	Jaime Jaquez Jr. (6)	Kaseya Center; 19,784	38–34
73	March 25	@ Cleveland	W 120–103	Norman Powell (19)	Kel'el Ware (11)	Bam Adebayo (7)	Rocket Arena; 19,432	39–34
74	March 27	@ Cleveland	L 128–149	Jamie Jaquez Jr. (20)	Bam Adebayo (16)	Herro, Larsson (5)	Rocket Arena; 19,432	39–35
75	March 29	@ Indiana	L 118–135	Tyler Herro (31)	Bam Adebayo (12)	Davion Mitchell (8)	Gainbridge Fieldhouse; 16,771	39–36
76	March 30	Philadelphia	W 119–109	Tyler Herro (30)	Bam Adebayo (16)	Bam Adebayo (6)	Kaseya Center; 19,742	40–36

April: 3–3 (home: 2–1; road: 1–2)

Game	Date	Team	Score	High points	High rebounds	High assists	Location Attendance	Record
77	April 1	Boston	L 129–147	Bam Adebayo (29)	Adebayo, Jaquez Jr. (10)	Herro, Mitchell (7)	Kaseya Center; 19,881	40–37
78	April 4	Washington	W 152–136	Jaime Jaquez Jr. (32)	Kel'el Ware (19)	Kasparas Jakučionis (9)	Kaseya Center; 19,700	41–37
79	April 7	@ Toronto	L 95–121	Andrew Wiggins (24)	Bam Adebayo (9)	Herro, Mitchell (6)	Scotiabank Arena; 18,425	41–38
80	April 9	@ Toronto	L 114–128	Bam Adebayo (24)	Bam Adebayo (11)	Davion Mitchell (11)	Scotiabank Arena; 19,142	41–39
81	April 10	@ Washington	W 140–117	Fontecchio, Larsson (24)	Bam Adebayo (11)	Adebayo, Jaquez Jr. (8)	Capital One Arena; 17,946	42–39
82	April 12	Atlanta	W 143–117	Jaime Jaquez Jr. (26)	Adebayo, Herro (10)	Tyler Herro (8)	Kaseya Center; 19,962	43–39

2025–26 season schedule

=== Play-in ===
2026 play-in game log
Total: 0–1 (Home: 0–0; Road: 0–1)
Play-in: 0–1 (home: 0–0; road: 0–1)

Game	Date	Team	Score	High points	High rebounds	High assists	Location Attendance	Record
1	April 14	@ Charlotte	L 126–127 (OT)	Davion Mitchell (28)	Kel'el Ware (19)	Jaime Jaquez Jr. (8)	Spectrum Center; 19,698	0–1

2025–26 season schedule

=== NBA Cup ===
==== East Group C ====
Pos	Team	Pld	W	L	PF	PA	PD	Qualification
1	New York Knicks	4	3	1	512	477	+35	Advanced to knockout rounds
2	Miami Heat	4	3	1	507	458	+49	Advanced to knockout rounds
3	Milwaukee Bucks	4	2	2	467	463	+4	
4	Charlotte Hornets	4	1	3	461	500	−39	
5	Chicago Bulls	4	1	3	468	517	−49	

Source: NBA

== Player statistics ==
=== Regular season ===
Player	POS	GP	GS	MP	REB	AST	STL	BLK	PTS	MPG	RPG	APG	SPG	BPG	PPG
Kel'el Ware	C	77	34	1,704	694	56	59	84	851	22.1	9.0	.7	.8	1.1	11.1
Jaime Jaquez Jr.	SF	75	1	2,121	375	352	51	21	1,152	28.3	5.0	4.7	.7	.3	15.4
Bam Adebayo	C	73	73	2,365	732	232	86	49	1,468	32.4	10.0	3.2	1.2	.7	20.1
Simone Fontecchio	SF	70	9	1,173	211	101	37	9	597	16.8	3.0	1.4	.5	.1	8.5
Pelle Larsson	SG	70	54	1,849	244	236	49	16	800	26.4	3.5	3.4	.7	.2	11.4
Davion Mitchell	PG	70	70	2,000	186	453	68	11	654	28.6	2.7	6.5	1.0	.2	9.3
Dru Smith	SG	70	1	1,141	173	180	100	21	395	16.3	2.5	2.6	1.4	.3	5.6
Andrew Wiggins	SF	68	68	2,063	329	182	76	69	1,045	30.3	4.8	2.7	1.1	1.0	15.4
Norman Powell	SG	58	52	1,717	203	143	64	14	1,261	29.6	3.5	2.5	1.1	.2	21.7
Kasparas Jakučionis	PG	53	12	945	138	137	33	7	328	17.8	2.6	2.6	.6	.1	6.2
Nikola Jović	PF	47	1	808	153	102	26	17	344	17.2	3.3	2.2	.6	.4	7.3
Myron Gardner	SF	45	7	411	122	44	20	8	163	9.1	2.7	1.0	.4	.2	3.6
Tyler Herro	SG	33	28	1,033	158	136	23	12	677	31.3	4.8	4.1	.7	.4	20.5
Keshad Johnson	SF	32	0	280	62	8	15	8	136	8.8	1.9	.3	.5	.3	4.3
Jahmir Young	PG	14	0	58	4	9	1	0	25	4.1	.3	.6	.1	.0	1.8
Vladislav Goldin	C	9	0	24	9	3	0	3	7	2.7	1.0	.3	.0	.3	.8
Trevor Keels	SG	8	0	15	2	0	1	0	8	1.9	.3	.0	.1	.0	1.0

- ^{†} Denotes player spent time with another team in the season. Stats reflect time with the Heat only.

== Transactions ==
=== Trades ===
July 7, 2025	To Miami Heat Simone Fontecchio	To Detroit Pistons Duncan Robinson
July 7, 2025	Three-team trade
July 7, 2025	To Miami Heat Norman Powell (from L.A. Clippers)	To Utah Jazz Kyle Anderson (from Miami); Kevin Love (from Miami); 2027 second-round pick (from L.A. Clippers)
July 7, 2025	To Los Angeles Clippers John Collins (from Utah)

=== Free agency ===
==== Re-signed ====
Date	Player	Ref.
July 7	Davion Mitchell	

==== Subtractions ====
Player	Reason	New Team	Ref.
Terry Rozier	Waived (Potentially related to some gambling issues.)		
