= Jaylen Wells =

American basketball player (born 2003)

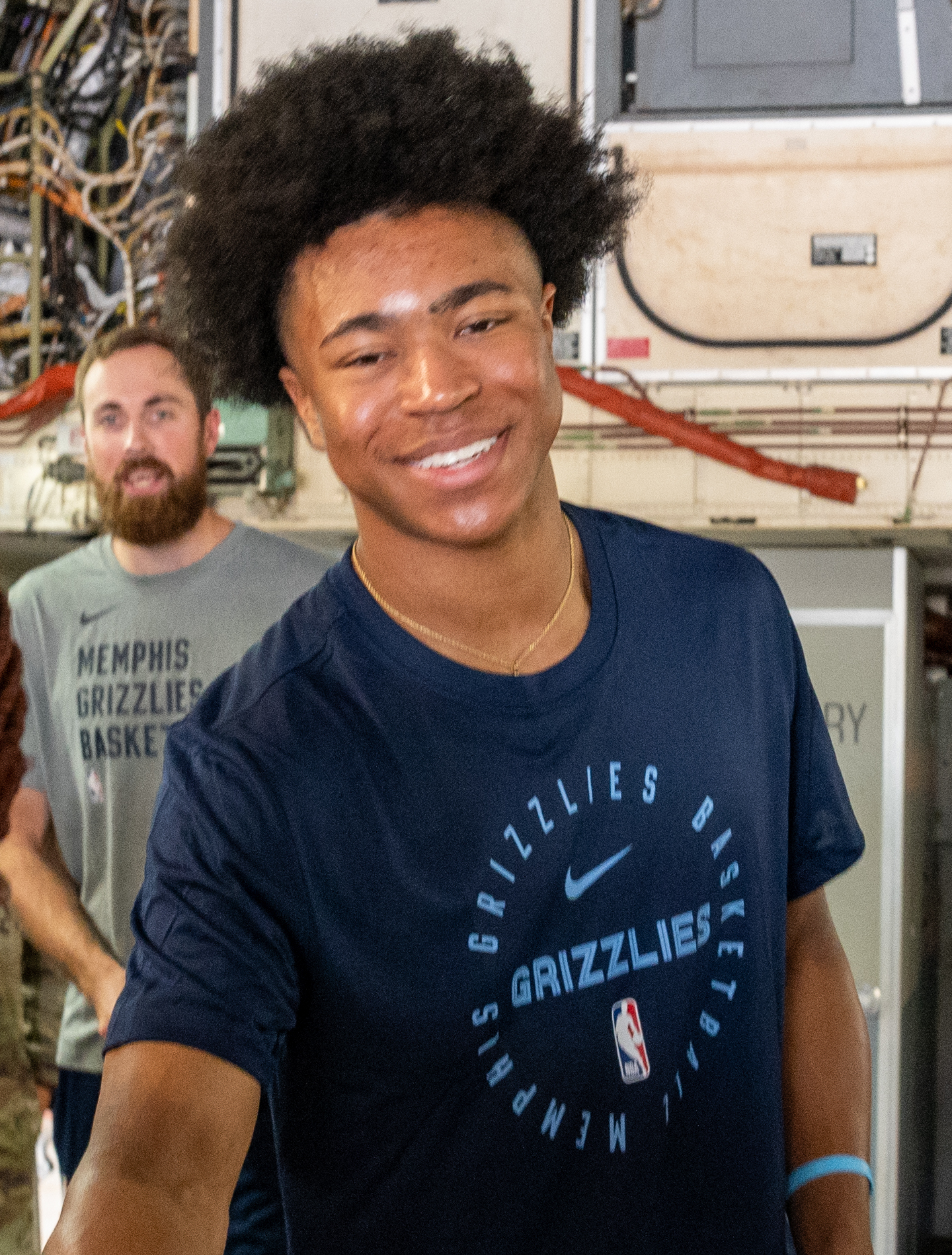
- Wells with the Memphis Grizzlies in 2024

No. 0 – Memphis Grizzlies
- Position: Small forward
- League: NBA

Personal information
- Born: August 26, 2003 (age 23) Sacramento, California, U.S.
- Listed height: 6 ft 7 in (2.01 m)
- Listed weight: 205 lb (93 kg)

Career information
- High school: Folsom (Folsom, California)
- College: Sonoma State (2021–2023); Washington State (2023–2024)
- NBA draft: 2024: 2nd round, 39th overall pick
- Drafted by: Memphis Grizzlies
- Playing career: 2024–present

Career history
- 2024–present: Memphis Grizzlies

Career highlights
- NBA All-Rookie First Team (2025); CCAA Player of the Year (2023); First-team All-CCAA (2023)
- Stats at NBA.com
- Stats at Basketball Reference

Jaylen Wells (born August 26, 2003) is an American professional basketball player for the Memphis Grizzlies of the National Basketball Association (NBA). He played college basketball for the Sonoma State Seawolves and the Washington State Cougars.

== Early life and high school career ==
Wells grew up in Sacramento, California and attended Folsom High School. As a senior, he averaged 26.3 points, 3.2 rebounds and 1.2 assists per game. He was named the area Player of the Year by The Sacramento Bee. Wells committed to play college basketball at Division II Sonoma State University.

== College career ==
Wells began his college basketball career playing for the Sonoma State Seawolves. He averaged 12.6 points per game during his freshman season. He was named the California Collegiate Athletic Association Player of the Year after averaging 22.4 points per game during his sophomore campaign. After the season, he entered the NCAA transfer portal.

Wells transferred to Washington State and entered his junior season as the Cougars' starting small forward. He averaged 12.6 points and 4.6 rebounds per game. After the season, Wells declared for the 2024 NBA draft while retaining his college eligibility. He later also re-entered the transfer portal. Wells later decided to remain in the draft.

== Professional career ==
On June 27, 2024, Wells was selected with the 39th overall pick by the Memphis Grizzlies in the 2024 NBA draft; on July 6, he signed with the Grizzlies. On October 23, Wells made his NBA debut, playing in a 126–124 victory over the Utah Jazz in the season opener. On October 31, Wells made his first career start against the Milwaukee Bucks where he scored a then career-high 16 points. On December 3, Wells was named Western Conference Rookie of the Month for games played in October/November. It marks the 16th time a Memphis Grizzlies player has won the honor. In 20 games, Wells averaged 12.2 points, 3.3 rebounds and 1.9 assists in 25 minutes while shooting over 45 percent from the court.

On April 8, 2025, Wells suffered a broken right wrist in a game against the Charlotte Hornets, ending his rookie season. The injury came just days before the postseason that the Grizzlies had recently clinched. His 10.4 points per game ranked fourth among eligible rookies that season.

Wells started 69 games for Memphis during the 2025–26 NBA season, recording averages of 12.5 points, 3.2 rebounds, and 1.6 assists. On March 29, 2026, it was announced that Wells would require season-ending surgery to address a tendon avulsion fracture in his right big toe.

== Personal life ==
In April 2025, it was reported that Wells had founded Sleep Nation with his high school friend, Ad Alsamariae, to help youths to achieve success in their sports careers.

== Career statistics ==
Legend
GP	Games played	GS	Games started	MPG	Minutes per game
FG%	Field goal percentage	3P%	3-point field goal percentage	FT%	Free throw percentage
RPG	Rebounds per game	APG	Assists per game	SPG	Steals per game
BPG	Blocks per game	PPG	Points per game	**Bold**	Career high

=== NBA ===
Year	Team	GP	GS	MPG	FG%	3P%	FT%	RPG	APG	SPG	BPG	PPG
2024–25	Memphis	**79**	**74**	25.9	.425	.352	**.822**	**3.4**	**1.7**	.6	**.1**	10.4
2025–26	Memphis	69	69	**26.4**	**.431**	**.353**	.784	3.2	1.6	**.9**	**.1**	**12.5**
Career		148	143	26.1	.428	.353	.801	3.3	1.7	.7	.1	11.4

=== College ===
==== NCAA Division II ====
Year	Team	GP	GS	MPG	FG%	3P%	FT%	RPG	APG	SPG	BPG	PPG
2021–22	Sonoma State	25	21	30.6	.406	.263	.716	5.8	1.7	1.0	.2	12.6
2022–23	Sonoma State	**30**	**30**	**36.8**	**.517**	**.438**	**.861**	**8.7**	**2.6**	**1.6**	**.4**	**22.4**
Career		55	51	34.0	.476	.355	.808	7.4	2.2	1.3	.3	17.9

==== NCAA Division I ====
Year	Team	GP	GS	MPG	FG%	3P%	FT%	RPG	APG	SPG	BPG	PPG
2023–24	Washington State	34	20	29.2	.436	.417	.814	4.6	1.2	.5	.2	12.6
