= 2024–25 Memphis Grizzlies season =

- Head coach: Taylor Jenkins (fired); Tuomas Iisalo (interim)
- General manager: Zach Kleiman
- Owner: Robert Pera
- Arena: FedExForum

Results
- Record: 48–34 (.585)
- Place: Division: 2nd (Southwest); Conference: 8th (Western)
- Playoff finish: First round (lost to Thunder 0–4)
- Stats at Basketball Reference

Local media
- Television: FanDuel Sports Network South; FanDuel Sports Network Southeast; Gray Media (Note: Includes: WMC-TV and WMC-DT3 (Memphis); WSMV-TV and Tennessee Valley Sports and Entertainment Network (Nashville); WBXX-TV and WVLT-DT2 (Knoxville)) (5 simulcasts)
- Radio: WMFS-FM

The 2024–25 Memphis Grizzlies season was the 30th season of the franchise in the National Basketball Association (NBA) and 24th in Memphis. This season would showcase the return of many of Memphis' key players, including Ja Morant, who would make his return after missing most of last season due to suspension and injury. After going 9–7 earlier in the season, the Grizzlies would gain separation as one of the better Western Conference teams this season. On March 28, 2025, the Grizzlies fired head coach Taylor Jenkins, despite having a 44–29 record and more or less having a confirmed spot for the 2025 NBA playoffs at the time. On April 11, the Grizzlies clinched at play-in spot following their loss to the Denver Nuggets. On April 18, the Grizzlies became the last team in the 2024–25 season to clinch a playoff berth after they defeated the Dallas Mavericks in the second play-in game. On April 20, the Grizzlies suffered an 131–80 defeat against the Oklahoma City Thunder, the worst game 1 defeat in NBA playoff history. On April 26, the Grizzlies were swept by the Thunder in the first round of the playoffs.

== Draft ==
Round	Pick	Player	Position	Nationality	College/club
1	9	Zach Edey	C	Canada	Purdue
2	39	Jaylen Wells	SG	United States	Washington State
2	57	Ulrich Chomche	PF	Cameroon	APR BBC (Rwanda); NBA Academy Africa

The Grizzlies had one first-round pick and two second-round picks entering the draft. Both second-round picks were originally owned by the Brooklyn Nets and the Oklahoma City Thunder, respectively, and were acquired from the Houston Rockets in February 2024 as an exchange for Steven Adams. For the first time in franchise history, the Grizzlies worked on the NBA draft for two straight days instead of one day like it had been since 1989.

In the first day, the Grizzlies decided to take Canadian center Zach Edey from Purdue University, a player who had previously been considered a mid-to-late first round entry, as the 9th pick of the draft due to them being enamored to his size and untapped potential that he has in the NBA. During the second day, the Grizzlies also acquired shooting guard/small forward Jaylen Wells from Washington State University, with them later trading their final second round pick, Cameroonian power forward Ulrich Chomche from the Basketball Africa League's APR BBC in Rwanda and the NBA Academy in Africa, to the Toronto Raptors and then acquiring NCAA champion guard Cam Spencer from the University of Connecticut via trading with the Detroit Pistons.

== Roster ==
2024–25 Memphis Grizzlies roster
Players

Pos.	No.	Player	Height	Weight	DOB	From
F/C	7	Santi Aldama	7 ft 0 in (2.13 m)	215 lb (98 kg)	2001-01-10	Loyola (MD)
F/C	35	Marvin Bagley III	6 ft 10 in (2.08 m)	235 lb (107 kg)	1999-03-14	Duke
G/F	22	Desmond Bane	6 ft 5 in (1.96 m)	215 lb (98 kg)	1998-06-25	TCU
F/C	15	Brandon Clarke	6 ft 8 in (2.03 m)	215 lb (98 kg)	1996-09-19	Gonzaga
C	14	Zach Edey	7 ft 4 in (2.24 m)	305 lb (138 kg)	2002-05-14	Purdue
C	30	Jay Huff	7 ft 1 in (2.16 m)	240 lb (109 kg)	1997-08-25	Virginia
F	45	GG Jackson	6 ft 9 in (2.06 m)	210 lb (95 kg)	2004-12-17	South Carolina
F/C	13	Jaren Jackson Jr.	6 ft 10 in (2.08 m)	242 lb (110 kg)	1999-09-15	Michigan State
G	17	Yuki Kawamura (TW)	5 ft 8 in (1.73 m)	159 lb (72 kg)	2001-03-02	Japan
G/F	10	Luke Kennard	6 ft 5 in (1.96 m)	206 lb (93 kg)	1996-06-24	Duke
G/F	46	John Konchar	6 ft 5 in (1.96 m)	210 lb (95 kg)	1996-03-22	Purdue Fort Wayne
G	12	Ja Morant	6 ft 2 in (1.88 m)	174 lb (79 kg)	1999-08-10	Murray State
G	1	Scotty Pippen Jr.	6 ft 1 in (1.85 m)	170 lb (77 kg)	2000-11-10	Vanderbilt
G	2	Zyon Pullin (TW)	6 ft 4 in (1.93 m)	206 lb (93 kg)	2001-03-03	Florida
G	24	Cam Spencer (TW)	6 ft 4 in (1.93 m)	205 lb (93 kg)	2000-04-06	Connecticut
F	8	Lamar Stevens	6 ft 7 in (2.01 m)	230 lb (104 kg)	1997-07-09	Penn State
F	0	Jaylen Wells	6 ft 8 in (2.03 m)	205 lb (93 kg)	2003-08-26	Washington State
G/F	5	Vince Williams Jr.	6 ft 4 in (1.93 m)	205 lb (93 kg)	2000-08-30	VCU

Coaches
Head coach
- Tuomas Iisalo (interim)
Assistant(s)
- Joe Boylan
- Anthony Carter
- Jason March
- Patrick Mutombo
- Erick Schmidt

Legend
- (DP) Unsigned draft pick
- (FA) Free agent
- (S) Suspended
- (GL) On assignment to G League affiliate
- (TW) Two-way affiliate player
- Injured

Roster
Updated: March 28, 2025

== Standings ==
=== Division ===
Southwest Division	W	L	PCT	GB	Home	Road	Div	GP
y – Houston Rockets	52	30	.634	–	29‍–‍12	23‍–‍18	13‍–‍3	82
x – Memphis Grizzlies	48	34	.585	4.0	26‍–‍15	22‍–‍19	11‍–‍5	82
pi – Dallas Mavericks	39	43	.476	13.0	22‍–‍18	17‍–‍25	8‍–‍8	82
San Antonio Spurs	34	48	.415	18.0	20‍–‍21	14‍–‍27	5‍–‍11	82
New Orleans Pelicans	21	61	.256	31.0	14‍–‍27	7‍–‍34	3‍–‍13	82

=== Conference ===
Western Conference
#	Team	W	L	PCT	GB	GP
1	z – Oklahoma City Thunder *	68	14	.829	–	82
2	y – Houston Rockets *	52	30	.634	16.0	82
3	y – Los Angeles Lakers *	50	32	.610	18.0	82
4	x – Denver Nuggets	50	32	.610	18.0	82
5	x – Los Angeles Clippers	50	32	.610	18.0	82
6	x – Minnesota Timberwolves	49	33	.598	19.0	82
7	x – Golden State Warriors	48	34	.585	20.0	82
8	x – Memphis Grizzlies	48	34	.585	20.0	82
9	pi – Sacramento Kings	40	42	.488	28.0	82
10	pi – Dallas Mavericks	39	43	.476	29.0	82
11	Phoenix Suns	36	46	.439	32.0	82
12	Portland Trail Blazers	36	46	.439	32.0	82
13	San Antonio Spurs	34	48	.415	34.0	82
14	New Orleans Pelicans	21	61	.256	47.0	82
15	Utah Jazz	17	65	.207	51.0	82

== Game log ==
=== Preseason ===
During the preseason, the Grizzlies would play their final games under what was previously named Bally Sports South and Bally Sports Southeast. Bally Sports would rebrand itself to the FanDuel Sports Network before the start of the regular season.

2024 preseason game log
Total: 3–2 (Home: 0–2; Road: 3–0)
Preseason: 3–2 (home: 0–2; road: 3–0)

Game	Date	Team	Score	High points	High rebounds	High assists	Location Attendance	Record
1	October 7	@ Dallas	W 121–116	Brandon Clarke (17)	Santi Aldama (8)	Scotty Pippen Jr. (6)	American Airlines Center; 19,207	1–0
2	October 10	Charlotte	L 94–119	Desmond Bane (17)	Huff, Wells (6)	Aldama, Pippen Jr. (5)	FedExForum; 13,411	1–1
3	October 12	@ Chicago	W 124–121	Jaylen Wells (24)	Huff, LaRavia (9)	Yuki Kawamura (8)	United Center; 20,465	2–1
4	October 14	@ Indiana	W 120–116	Bane, Edey (23)	Zach Edey (9)	Yuki Kawamura (7)	Gainbridge Fieldhouse; 11,221	3–1
5	October 18	Miami	L 109–114	Aldama, Bane (19)	Ja Morant (8)	Desmond Bane (7)	FedExForum; 14,113	3–2

2024–25 preseason schedule

=== Regular season ===
2024–25 game log
Total: 48–34 (Home: 26–15; Road: 22–19)
October: 3–3 (home: 2–2; road: 1–1)

Game	Date	Team	Score	High points	High rebounds	High assists	Location Attendance	Record
1	October 23	@ Utah	W 126–124	Santi Aldama (27)	Aldama, Edey, Huff, Konchar, Morant, Smart (5)	Ja Morant (10)	Delta Center; 18,175	1–0
2	October 25	@ Houston	L 108–128	Ja Morant (24)	Zach Edey (9)	Bane, LaRavia, Pippen Jr. (4)	Toyota Center; 18,055	1–1
3	October 26	Orlando	W 124–111	Santi Aldama (22)	Aldama, Bane, LaRavia (7)	Scotty Pippen Jr. (12)	FedExForum; 17,809	2–1
4	October 28	Chicago	L 123–126	Desmond Bane (30)	Santi Aldama (13)	Scotty Pippen Jr. (10)	FedExForum; 15,906	2–2
5	October 30	Brooklyn	L 106–119	Jaren Jackson Jr. (30)	Ja Morant (8)	Ja Morant (11)	FedExForum; 14,745	2–3
6	October 31	Milwaukee	W 122–99	Ja Morant (26)	LaRavia, Morant (10)	Ja Morant (14)	FedExForum; 15,377	3–3

November: 10–4 (home: 7–1; road: 3–3)

Game	Date	Team	Score	High points	High rebounds	High assists	Location Attendance	Record
7	November 2	@ Philadelphia	W 124–107	Jaren Jackson Jr. (27)	Santi Aldama (13)	Scotty Pippen Jr. (13)	Wells Fargo Center; 20,066	4–3
8	November 4	@ Brooklyn	L 104–106	Edey, Morant (25)	Zach Edey (12)	Ja Morant (9)	Barclays Center; 18,088	4–4
9	November 6	L.A. Lakers	W 131–114	J. Jackson, Morant, Wells (20)	Santi Aldama (12)	Jake LaRavia (8)	FedExForum; 17,794	5–4
10	November 8	Washington	W 128–104	Jaren Jackson Jr. (39)	Scotty Pippen Jr. (10)	Scotty Pippen Jr. (11)	FedExForum; 16,216	6–4
11	November 10	@ Portland	W 134–89	Jaren Jackson Jr. (20)	Jaren Jackson Jr. (7)	Luke Kennard (11)	Moda Center; 18,477	7–4
12	November 13	@ L.A. Lakers	L 123–128	Jaren Jackson Jr. (29)	Zach Edey (8)	Marcus Smart (6)	Crypto.com Arena; 18,997	7–5
13	November 15	@ Golden State	L 118–123	Jaren Jackson Jr. (32)	Zach Edey (9)	Marcus Smart (6)	Chase Center; 18,064	7–6
14	November 17	Denver	W 105–90	Jaren Jackson Jr. (20)	Desmond Bane (11)	Desmond Bane (7)	FedExForum; 16,351	8–6
15	November 19	Denver	L 110–122	Santi Aldama (28)	Santi Aldama (11)	Scotty Pippen Jr. (6)	FedExForum; 15,377	8–7
16	November 20	Philadelphia	W 117–111	Jaren Jackson Jr. (25)	Desmond Bane (10)	Aldama, Bane (6)	FedExForum; 15,533	9–7
17	November 23	@ Chicago	W 142–131	Scotty Pippen Jr. (30)	Santi Aldama (10)	Scotty Pippen Jr. (10)	United Center; 19,449	10–7
18	November 25	Portland	W 123–98	Ja Morant (22)	Santi Aldama (17)	Ja Morant (11)	FedExForum; 15,796	11–7
19	November 27	Detroit	W 131–111	Marcus Smart (25)	Bane, Pippen Jr. (7)	Desmond Bane (7)	FedExForum; 16,261	12–7
20	November 29	New Orleans	W 120–109	Ja Morant (27)	Brandon Clarke (11)	Ja Morant (7)	FedExForum; 17,014	13–7

December: 10–4 (home: 5–1; road: 5–3)

Game	Date	Team	Score	High points	High rebounds	High assists	Location Attendance	Record
21	December 1	Indiana	W 136–121	Jaren Jackson Jr. (25)	Jaren Jackson Jr. (8)	Ja Morant (8)	FedExForum; 15,901	14–7
22	December 3	@ Dallas	L 116–121	Ja Morant (31)	Santi Aldama (8)	Marcus Smart (6)	American Airlines Center; 20,277	14–8
23	December 5	Sacramento	W 115–110	Bane, Smart (18)	Santi Aldama (10)	Bane, Morant (7)	FedExForum; 15,776	15–8
24	December 7	@ Boston	W 127–121	Ja Morant (32)	Huff, J. Jackson, Morant (9)	Ja Morant (9)	TD Garden; 19,156	16–8
25	December 8	@ Washington	W 140–112	Jaren Jackson Jr. (21)	John Konchar (8)	Scotty Pippen Jr. (12)	Capital One Arena; 15,012	17–8
26	December 13	Brooklyn	W 135–119	Ja Morant (28)	Brandon Clarke (8)	Ja Morant (10)	FedExForum; 15,983	18–8
27	December 15	@ L.A. Lakers	L 110–116	Jaren Jackson Jr. (25)	Zach Edey (10)	Desmond Bane (7)	Crypto.com Arena; 15,106	18–9
28	December 19	Golden State	W 144–93	Santi Aldama (21)	Santi Aldama (14)	Desmond Bane (7)	FedExForum; 17,729	19–9
29	December 21	@ Atlanta	W 128–112	Desmond Bane (23)	Aldama, Edey (6)	Scotty Pippen Jr. (9)	State Farm Arena; 16,909	20–9
30	December 23	L.A. Clippers	L 110–114	Jaren Jackson Jr. (24)	Zach Edey (14)	Desmond Bane (7)	FedExForum; 17,265	20–10
31	December 26	Toronto	W 155–126	Edey, J. Jackson (21)	Zach Edey (16)	Ja Morant (9)	FedExForum; 17,196	21-10
32	December 27	@ New Orleans	W 132–124	Jaren Jackson Jr. (33)	Zach Edey (9)	Desmond Bane (8)	Smoothie King Center; 17,328	22–10
33	December 29	@ Oklahoma City	L 106–130	Desmond Bane (22)	John Konchar (15)	Scotty Pippen Jr. (9)	Paycom Center; 18,203	22–11
34	December 31	@ Phoenix	W 117–112	Jaren Jackson Jr. (38)	J. Jackson, Konchar (12)	Desmond Bane (7)	Footprint Center; 17,071	23–11

January: 9–5 (home: 6–1; road: 3–4)

Game	Date	Team	Score	High points	High rebounds	High assists	Location Attendance	Record
35	January 3	@ Sacramento	L 133–138	Jaylen Wells (30)	Clarke, Kennard (8)	Luke Kennard (9)	Golden 1 Center; 16,601	23–12
36	January 4	@ Golden State	L 113–121	Jaren Jackson Jr. (23)	Jaren Jackson Jr. (9)	Bane, LaRavia (10)	Chase Center; 18,064	23–13
37	January 6	Dallas	W 119–104	Jaren Jackson Jr. (35)	J. Jackson, Konchar (13)	Jaren Jackson Jr. (5)	FedExForum; 16,412	24–13
38	January 9	Houston	L 115–119	Ja Morant (27)	Santi Aldama (9)	Bane, J. Jackson (4)	FedExForum; 16,298	24–14
39	January 11	@ Minnesota	W 127–125	Jaren Jackson Jr. (33)	Zach Edey (9)	Bane, Kennard (5)	Target Center; 18,978	25–14
40	January 13	@ Houston	L 118–120	Ja Morant (29)	Edey, LaRavia (7)	Ja Morant (4)	Toyota Center; 18,055	25–15
41	January 15	@ San Antonio	W 129–115	Bane, Morant (21)	Santi Aldama (10)	Ja Morant (12)	Frost Bank Center; 18,354	26–15
42	January 17	@ San Antonio	W 140–112	Santi Aldama (29)	Aldama, LaRavia (8)	Desmond Bane (14)	Frost Bank Center; 18,354	27–15
43	January 20	Minnesota	W 108–106	Jaren Jackson Jr. (24)	Jaren Jackson Jr. (11)	Ja Morant (7)	FedExForum; 17,794	28–15
44	January 22	Charlotte	W 132–120	Desmond Bane (24)	Edey, J. Jackson (6)	Ja Morant (13)	FedExForum; 15,971	29–15
45	January 24	New Orleans	W 139–126	Jaren Jackson Jr. (29)	Zach Edey (11)	Desmond Bane (14)	FedExForum; 16,495	30–15
46	January 25	Utah	W 125–103	Jaren Jackson Jr. (28)	Desmond Bane (9)	Ja Morant (7)	FedExForum; 17,011	31–15
47	January 27	@ New York	L 106–143	Jaren Jackson Jr. (21)	Zach Edey (11)	Luke Kennard (7)	Madison Square Garden; 19,812	31–16
48	January 30	Houston	W 120–119	Desmond Bane (24)	Desmond Bane (12)	Desmond Bane (6)	FedExForum; 16,257	32–16

February: 6–5 (home: 2–2; road: 4–3)

Game	Date	Team	Score	High points	High rebounds	High assists	Location Attendance	Record
49	February 2	@ Milwaukee	W 132–119	Jaren Jackson Jr. (37)	Zach Edey (11)	Scotty Pippen Jr. (10)	Fiserv Forum; 17,341	33–16
50	February 3	San Antonio	W 128–109	Jaren Jackson Jr. (31)	Zach Edey (14)	Ja Morant (11)	FedExForum; 16,575	34–16
51	February 5	@ Toronto	W 138–107	Jaren Jackson Jr. (32)	Zach Edey (15)	J. Jackson, Morant (4)	Scotiabank Arena; 18,337	35–16
52	February 8	Oklahoma City	L 112–125	Desmond Bane (20)	Desmond Bane (9)	Ja Morant (7)	FedExForum; 17,794	35–17
53	February 11	@ Phoenix	W 119–112	Ja Morant (26)	Edey, Williams Jr. (9)	Ja Morant (6)	Footprint Center; 17,071	36–17
54	February 12	@ L.A. Clippers	L 114–128	Desmond Bane (23)	GG Jackson (8)	Santi Aldama (7)	Intuit Dome; 14,997	36–18
All-Star Game
55	February 20	@ Indiana	L 113–127	Desmond Bane (23)	Zach Edey (11)	Desmond Bane (7)	Gainbridge Fieldhouse; 17,274	36–19
56	February 21	@ Orlando	W 105–104	Ja Morant (23)	Aldama, Clarke (11)	Ja Morant (5)	Kia Center; 18,945	37–19
57	February 23	@ Cleveland	L 123–129	Jaren Jackson Jr. (22)	Zach Edey (9)	Ja Morant (10)	Rocket Arena; 19,432	37–20
58	February 25	Phoenix	W 151–148 (OT)	Ja Morant (29)	Zach Edey (8)	Desmond Bane (9)	FedExForum; 16,202	38–20
59	February 28	New York	L 113–114	Ja Morant (25)	Desmond Bane (12)	Ja Morant (7)	FedExForum; 17,794	38–21

March: 6–10 (home: 3–6; road: 3–4)

Game	Date	Team	Score	High points	High rebounds	High assists	Location Attendance	Record
60	March 1	San Antonio	L 128–130	Jaren Jackson Jr. (42)	Zach Edey (9)	Santi Aldama (11)	FedExForum; 16,822	38–22
61	March 3	Atlanta	L 130–132	Desmond Bane (35)	Desmond Bane (10)	Desmond Bane (10)	FedExForum; 15,719	38–23
62	March 5	Oklahoma City	L 103–120	Ja Morant (24)	Brandon Clarke (11)	Ja Morant (6)	FedExForum; 16,723	38–24
63	March 7	@ Dallas	W 122–111	Ja Morant (31)	Desmond Bane (16)	Ja Morant (8)	American Airlines Center; 20,010	39–24
64	March 9	@ New Orleans	W 107–104	Ja Morant (32)	Zach Edey (12)	Desmond Bane (8)	Smoothie King Center; 17,435	40–24
65	March 10	Phoenix	W 120–118	Ja Morant (29)	Desmond Bane (7)	Ja Morant (12)	FedExForum; 16,545	41–24
66	March 12	Utah	W 122–115	Luke Kennard (30)	Lamar Stevens (6)	Desmond Bane (9)	FedExForum; 16,232	42–24
67	March 14	Cleveland	L 124–133	Ja Morant (44)	Ja Morant (8)	Ja Morant (7)	FedExForum; 17,051	42–25
68	March 15	Miami	W 125–91	Jaren Jackson Jr. (31)	Desmond Bane (10)	Scotty Pippen Jr. (11)	FedExForum; 17,794	43–25
69	March 17	@ Sacramento	L 122–132	Desmond Bane (44)	Clarke, Edey, Konchar (8)	Luke Kennard (8)	Golden 1 Center; 16,205	43–26
70	March 19	@ Portland	L 99–115	Desmond Bane (20)	Desmond Bane (7)	Bane, Pippen Jr. (4)	Moda Center; 18,491	43–27
71	March 21	@ L.A. Clippers	L 108–128	Jaren Jackson Jr. (23)	Edey, Williams Jr. (8)	Santi Aldama (7)	Intuit Dome; 17,927	43–28
72	March 25	@ Utah	W 140–103	Desmond Bane (21)	Edey, Konchar (7)	Scotty Pippen Jr. (10)	Delta Center; 18,175	44–28
73	March 27	@ Oklahoma City	L 104–125	Jaren Jackson Jr. (27)	Scotty Pippen Jr. (10)	Scotty Pippen Jr. (7)	Paycom Center; 18,203	44–29
74	March 29	L.A. Lakers	L 127–134	Desmond Bane (29)	Zach Edey (11)	Ja Morant (10)	FedExForum; 18,087	44–30
75	March 31	Boston	L 103–117	Ja Morant (26)	Jaren Jackson Jr. (15)	Ja Morant (5)	FedExForum; 16,867	44–31

April: 4–3 (home: 1–2; road: 3–1)

Game	Date	Team	Score	High points	High rebounds	High assists	Location Attendance	Record
76	April 1	Golden State	L 125–134	Ja Morant (36)	Zach Edey (16)	Ja Morant (6)	FedExForum; 17,794	44–32
77	April 3	@ Miami	W 110–108	Ja Morant (30)	Zach Edey (13)	Scotty Pippen Jr. (7)	Kaseya Center; 19,700	45–32
78	April 5	@ Detroit	W 109–103	Desmond Bane (38)	Zach Edey (21)	Zach Edey (6)	Little Caesars Arena; 20,062	46–32
79	April 8	@ Charlotte	W 124–100	Ja Morant (28)	Zach Edey (19)	Ja Morant (8)	Spectrum Center; 17,125	47–32
80	April 10	Minnesota	L 125–141	Ja Morant (36)	Zach Edey (9)	Desmond Bane (9)	FedExForum; 17,007	47–33
81	April 11	@ Denver	L 109–117	Desmond Bane (24)	Zach Edey (16)	Scotty Pippen Jr. (7)	Ball Arena; 20,015	47–34
82	April 13	Dallas	W 132–97	Lamar Stevens (31)	Marvin Bagley III (12)	Cam Spencer (7)	FedExForum; 17,794	48–34

2024–25 season schedule

=== Play-in ===
2025 play-in game log
Total: 1–1 (Home: 1–0; Road: 0–1)
Play-in: 1–1 (home: 1–0; road: 0–1)

Game	Date	Team	Score	High points	High rebounds	High assists	Location Attendance	Record
1	April 15	@ Golden State	L 116–121	Desmond Bane (30)	Zach Edey (17)	Scotty Pippen Jr. (5)	Chase Center; 18,064	0–1
2	April 18	Dallas	W 120–106	Jaren Jackson Jr. (24)	Zach Edey (11)	Bane, Morant (9)	FedExForum; 17,794	1–1

2024–25 season schedule

=== Playoffs ===
2025 playoff game log
Total: 0–4 (home: 0–2; road: 0–2)
First Round: 0–4 (home: 0–2; road: 0–2)

Game	Date	Team	Score	High points	High rebounds	High assists	Location Attendance	Series
1	April 20	@ Oklahoma City	L 80–131	Bagley, Morant (17)	Zach Edey (9)	Morant, Pippen Jr. (4)	Paycom Center; 18,203	0–1
2	April 22	@ Oklahoma City	L 99–118	Jaren Jackson Jr. (26)	Desmond Bane (12)	Ja Morant (6)	Paycom Center; 18,203	0–2
3	April 24	Oklahoma City	L 108–114	Scotty Pippen Jr. (28)	Desmond Bane (8)	Morant, Pippen Jr. (5)	FedExForum; 16,849	0–3
4	April 26	Oklahoma City	L 115–117	Scotty Pippen Jr. (30)	Scotty Pippen Jr. (11)	Desmond Bane (5)	FedExForum; 16,667	0–4

2025 playoff schedule

=== NBA Cup ===
The groups were revealed during the tournament announcement on July 12, 2024.

==== West Group C ====
Pos	Team	Pld	W	L	PF	PA	PD	Qualification
1	Golden State Warriors	4	3	1	470	462	+8	Advance to knockout stage
2	Dallas Mavericks	4	3	1	493	447	+46	Advance to knockout stage
3	Denver Nuggets	4	2	2	455	449	+6	
4	Memphis Grizzlies	4	1	3	464	475	−11	
5	New Orleans Pelicans	4	1	3	409	458	−49	

Source: NBA
Rules for classification: Tiebreakers

== Player statistics ==
=== Regular season ===
Player	POS	GP	GS	MP	REB	AST	STL	BLK	PTS	MPG	RPG	APG	SPG	BPG	PPG
Scotty Pippen Jr.	PG	79	21	1,683	259	347	103	30	779	21.3	3.3	4.4	1.3	.4	9.9
Jaylen Wells	SG	79	74	2,043	268	135	44	8	823	25.9	3.4	1.7	.6	.1	10.4
Jaren Jackson Jr.	C	74	74	2,207	417	148	92	113	1,641	29.8	5.6	2.0	1.2	1.5	22.2
Desmond Bane	SG	69	68	2,205	418	369	80	28	1,327	32.0	6.1	5.3	1.2	.4	19.2
Zach Edey	C	66	55	1,416	548	65	36	85	610	21.5	8.3	1.0	.5	1.3	9.2
Santi Aldama	PF	65	16	1,660	416	188	52	29	811	25.5	6.4	2.9	.8	.4	12.5
Luke Kennard	SG	65	11	1,472	183	215	50	5	576	22.6	2.8	3.3	.8	.1	8.9
Brandon Clarke	PF	64	18	1,207	326	66	52	36	534	18.9	5.1	1.0	.8	.6	8.3
Jay Huff	C	64	2	748	129	38	16	56	439	11.7	2.0	.6	.3	.9	6.9
Ja Morant	PG	50	50	1,519	205	364	61	12	1,159	30.4	4.1	7.3	1.2	.2	23.2
Jake LaRavia^{†}	PF	47	0	982	205	133	44	20	343	20.9	4.4	2.8	.9	.4	7.3
John Konchar	SG	46	4	558	151	42	30	14	112	12.1	3.3	.9	.7	.3	2.4
GG Jackson	PF	29	3	459	92	29	12	5	209	15.8	3.2	1.0	.4	.2	7.2
Vince Williams Jr.	SG	27	5	499	98	55	12	7	179	18.5	3.6	2.0	.4	.3	6.6
Cam Spencer	SG	25	1	252	30	34	9	1	106	10.1	1.2	1.4	.4	.0	4.2
Yuki Kawamura	PG	22	0	93	12	19	2	0	36	4.2	.5	.9	.1	.0	1.6
Marcus Smart^{†}	PG	19	6	400	43	71	23	6	165	21.1	2.3	3.7	1.2	.3	8.7
Lamar Stevens	PF	17	1	155	38	8	5	3	74	9.1	2.2	.5	.3	.2	4.4
Marvin Bagley III^{†}	PF	12	1	99	28	4	2	3	43	8.3	2.3	.3	.2	.3	3.6
Colin Castleton^{†}	C	10	0	46	9	0	1	1	14	4.6	.9	.0	.1	.1	1.4
Zyon Pullin	SG	3	0	3	0	0	0	0	0	1.0	.0	.0	.0	.0	.0

- ^{†} Denotes player spent time with another team in the season. Stats reflect time with the Grizzlies only.

=== Playoffs ===
Player	POS	GP	GS	MP	REB	AST	STL	BLK	PTS	MPG	RPG	APG	SPG	BPG	PPG
Santi Aldama	PF	4	1	122	24	7	0	1	52	30.5	6.0	1.8	.0	.3	13.0
Desmond Bane	SG	4	4	139	27	13	3	2	61	34.8	6.8	3.3	.8	.5	15.3
Zach Edey	C	4	4	108	31	7	0	10	25	27.0	7.8	1.8	.0	2.5	6.3
Jaren Jackson Jr.	C	4	4	137	20	6	4	2	64	34.3	5.0	1.5	1.0	.5	16.0
Luke Kennard	SG	4	0	80	14	8	4	1	18	20.0	3.5	2.0	1.0	.3	4.5
John Konchar	SG	4	0	69	13	6	2	2	11	17.3	3.3	1.5	.5	.5	2.8
Scotty Pippen Jr.	PG	4	4	129	22	14	4	1	73	32.3	5.5	3.5	1.0	.3	18.3
Ja Morant	PG	3	3	82	6	15	2	2	55	27.3	2.0	5.0	.7	.7	18.3
Vince Williams Jr.	SG	3	0	38	7	4	2	1	14	12.7	2.3	1.3	.7	.3	4.7
Marvin Bagley III	PF	2	0	28	6	0	2	1	17	14.0	3.0	.0	1.0	.5	8.5
Jay Huff	C	2	0	18	3	1	0	3	8	9.0	1.5	.5	.0	1.5	4.0
Lamar Stevens	PF	2	0	12	4	1	0	0	4	6.0	2.0	.5	.0	.0	2.0

== Transactions ==
=== Trades ===
July 19, 2024	To Memphis Grizzlies Mamadi Diakite; Draft rights to Nemanja Dangubić (2014 No. 54)	To Brooklyn Nets Ziaire Williams; 2030 DAL second-round pick
February 6, 2025	Three-team trade
February 6, 2025	To Memphis Grizzlies Marvin Bagley III (from Washington); Johnny Davis (from Washington); 2025 WAS second-round pick (from Washington); 2028 SAC second-round pick (from Sacramento)	To Sacramento Kings Jake LaRavia (from Memphis)
February 6, 2025	To Washington Wizards Colby Jones (from Sacramento); Alex Len (from Sacramento); Marcus Smart (from Memphis); 2025 MEM protected first-round pick (from Memphis)

=== Free agency ===
==== Additions ====
Player	Signed	Former Team	Ref.
Jay Huff	Two-way contract	Denver Nuggets / Grand Rapids Gold	
Yuki Kawamura	Two-way contract	(Japan) Yokohama B-Corsairs	

==== Subtractions ====
Player	Reason	New Team(s)	Ref.
Yuta Watanabe	Free agency	(Japan) Chiba Jets Funabashi	
Trey Jemison	Waived	New Orleans Pelicans / Birmingham Squadron	
