= 2024–25 Minnesota Timberwolves season =

2024–25 NBA season by team

- Head coach: Chris Finch
- General manager: Tim Connelly
- Owner: Glen Taylor
- Arena: Target Center

Results
- Record: 49–33 (.598)
- Place: Division: 3rd (Northwest); Conference: 6th (Western)
- Playoff finish: Western Conference Finals (lost to Thunder 1–4)
- Stats at Basketball Reference

Local media
- Television: FanDuel Sports Network North · KARE (5 games)
- Radio: KFXN

The 2024–25 Minnesota Timberwolves season was the 36th season for the franchise in the National Basketball Association (NBA). This season was also the first season since the 2014–15 season without Karl-Anthony Towns on the roster as he was traded to the New York Knicks in a 3-team trade exchange for Julius Randle, guard Donte DiVincenzo, forward Keita Bates-Diop and a future first-round pick via the Charlotte Hornets.

On April 13, the Timberwolves clinched their fourth consecutive playoff berth following their victory over the Utah Jazz. Being the sixth seed in the West, they were underdogs against the third seed Los Angeles Lakers in the first round, but ended up upsetting the Lakers in five games, marking the first time in franchise history they won a playoff round in consecutive seasons. They subsequently defeated the seventh seed Golden State Warriors in five games, their first home playoff series win since 2004. With the series win, they played in the Western Conference Finals for the second consecutive year, but lost to the eventual champion Oklahoma City Thunder in–again, for the second consecutive year–five games, denying them their first-ever NBA Finals appearance in the process. This also became the last season where Glen Taylor would own the Timberwolves franchise, as following a court case relating to who should own the franchise regarding a dispute Taylor made with the two parties in question, both Marc Lore and former Major League Baseball star player Alex Rodriguez were ruled to own the Timberwolves following the conclusion of this season.

The Minnesota Timberwolves drew an average home attendance of 18,833, the 10th-highest of all NBA teams.

== Draft ==
Round	Pick	Player	Position(s)	Nationality	College / club
1	27	Terrence Shannon	SG	United States	Illinois
2	37	Bobi Klintman	PF	Sweden	Cairns Taipans (Australia)

The Timberwolves had one first-round pick and one second-round pick entering the draft, both of which were acquired through previous trades. For the first time in franchise history, the Timberwolves worked on the NBA draft for two straight days instead of one day like it had been since the franchise first existed back in 1989. On the first night of the draft, the Timberwolves would trade with the San Antonio Spurs to acquire former Overtime Elite and University of Kentucky guard Rob Dillingham. Near the end of the first night of the draft, the Timberwolves would draft Terrence Shannon with the 27th pick of the draft. Then, on the second day of the draft, Minnesota would draft Swedish power forward Bobi Klintman from the Cairns Taipans of Australia.

== Roster ==
2024–25 Minnesota Timberwolves roster
Players

Pos.	No.	Player	Height	Weight	DOB	From
G/F	9	Nickeil Alexander-Walker	6 ft 5 in (1.96 m)	205 lb (93 kg)	1998-09-02	Virginia Tech
G	22	Jaylen Clark	6 ft 4 in (1.93 m)	205 lb (93 kg)	2001-10-13	UCLA
G	10	Mike Conley Jr.	6 ft 0 in (1.83 m)	175 lb (79 kg)	1987-10-11	Ohio State
G	4	Rob Dillingham	6 ft 3 in (1.91 m)	175 lb (79 kg)	2005-01-04	Kentucky
G	0	Donte DiVincenzo	6 ft 4 in (1.93 m)	203 lb (92 kg)	1997-01-31	Villanova
G	5	Anthony Edwards	6 ft 4 in (1.93 m)	225 lb (102 kg)	2001-08-05	Georgia
C	14	Jesse Edwards (TW)	7 ft 0 in (2.13 m)	236 lb (107 kg)	2000-03-18	West Virginia
F/C	55	Luka Garza	6 ft 10 in (2.08 m)	243 lb (110 kg)	1998-12-27	Iowa
C	27	Rudy Gobert	7 ft 1 in (2.16 m)	258 lb (117 kg)	1992-06-26	France
G	77	Bones Hyland (TW)	6 ft 2 in (1.88 m)	169 lb (77 kg)	2000-09-14	VCU
G/F	7	Joe Ingles	6 ft 8 in (2.03 m)	220 lb (100 kg)	1987-10-02	Australia
F	3	Jaden McDaniels	6 ft 9 in (2.06 m)	185 lb (84 kg)	2000-09-29	Washington
F	33	Leonard Miller	6 ft 10 in (2.08 m)	220 lb (100 kg)	2003-11-26	Fort Erie (CAN)
F	8	Josh Minott	6 ft 8 in (2.03 m)	205 lb (93 kg)	2002-11-25	Memphis
G	13	Tristen Newton (TW)	6 ft 5 in (1.96 m)	190 lb (86 kg)	2001-04-26	Connecticut
F	30	Julius Randle	6 ft 9 in (2.06 m)	250 lb (113 kg)	1994-11-29	Kentucky
F/C	11	Naz Reid	6 ft 9 in (2.06 m)	264 lb (120 kg)	1999-08-26	LSU
G/F	00	Terrence Shannon Jr.	6 ft 6 in (1.98 m)	215 lb (98 kg)	2000-07-30	Illinois

Coaches
Head coach
- Chris Finch
Assistant(s)
- Nathan Bubes
- Moses Ehambe
- Kevin Hanson
- Chris Hines
- Max Lefevre
- Jeff Newton
- Micah Nori
- Pablo Prigioni
- Elston Turner
- Corliss Williamson

Legend
- (DP) Unsigned draft pick
- (FA) Free agent
- (S) Suspended
- (GL) On assignment to G League affiliate
- (TW) Two-way affiliate player
- Injured

Roster
Updated: January 19, 2025

== Standings ==
=== Division ===
Northwest Division	W	L	PCT	GB	Home	Road	Div	GP
z – Oklahoma City Thunder	68	14	.829	–	36‍–‍6	32‍–‍8	12‍–‍4	82
x – Denver Nuggets	50	32	.610	18.0	26‍–‍15	24‍–‍17	8‍–‍8	82
x – Minnesota Timberwolves	49	33	.598	19.0	25‍–‍16	24‍–‍17	11‍–‍5	82
Portland Trail Blazers	36	46	.439	32.0	22‍–‍19	14‍–‍27	6‍–‍10	82
Utah Jazz	17	65	.207	51.0	10‍–‍31	7‍–‍34	3‍–‍13	82

=== Conference ===
Western Conference
#	Team	W	L	PCT	GB	GP
1	z – Oklahoma City Thunder *	68	14	.829	–	82
2	y – Houston Rockets *	52	30	.634	16.0	82
3	y – Los Angeles Lakers *	50	32	.610	18.0	82
4	x – Denver Nuggets	50	32	.610	18.0	82
5	x – Los Angeles Clippers	50	32	.610	18.0	82
6	x – Minnesota Timberwolves	49	33	.598	19.0	82
7	x – Golden State Warriors	48	34	.585	20.0	82
8	x – Memphis Grizzlies	48	34	.585	20.0	82
9	pi – Sacramento Kings	40	42	.488	28.0	82
10	pi – Dallas Mavericks	39	43	.476	29.0	82
11	Phoenix Suns	36	46	.439	32.0	82
12	Portland Trail Blazers	36	46	.439	32.0	82
13	San Antonio Spurs	34	48	.415	34.0	82
14	New Orleans Pelicans	21	61	.256	47.0	82
15	Utah Jazz	17	65	.207	51.0	82

== Game log ==
=== Preseason ===
During the preseason, the Timberwolves would play their final games under what was previously named Bally Sports North. Bally Sports would rebrand itself to the FanDuel Sports Network as of October 21, 2024, before the start of the regular season.

2024 preseason game log
Total: 2–3 (Home: 1–1; Road: 1–2)
Preseason: 2–3 (home: 1–1; road: 1–2)

Game	Date	Team	Score	High points	High rebounds	High assists	Location Attendance	Record
1	October 4	@ L.A. Lakers	W 124–107	Josh Minott (22)	Luka Garza (9)	Terrence Shannon Jr. (5)	Acrisure Arena; 9,235	1–0
2	October 11	Philadelphia	W 121–111	Naz Reid (19)	Donte DiVincenzo (7)	Rob Dillingham (9)	Wells Fargo Arena; 14,981	2–0
3	October 13	@ New York	L 110–115	Anthony Edwards (31)	Rudy Gobert (10)	Donte DiVincenzo (7)	Madison Square Garden; 19,812	2–1
4	October 16	@ Chicago	L 123–125	Josh Minott (18)	Rudy Gobert (17)	DiVincenzo, McDaniels, Randle (5)	United Center; 17,218	2–2
5	October 17	Denver	L 126–132	Luka Garza (29)	Luka Garza (9)	Rob Dillingham (7)	Target Center; 13,166	2–3

2024–25 preseason schedule

=== Regular season ===
2024–25 game log
Total: 49–33 (Home: 25–16; Road: 24–17)
October: 2–2 (home: 1–1; road: 1–1)

Game	Date	Team	Score	High points	High rebounds	High assists	Location Attendance	Record
1	October 22	@ L.A. Lakers	L 103–110	Anthony Edwards (27)	Rudy Gobert (14)	Julius Randle (4)	Crypto.com Arena; 18,997	0–1
2	October 24	@ Sacramento	W 117–115	Julius Randle (33)	Naz Reid (13)	Conley, Edwards, Randle (4)	Golden 1 Center; 18,049	1–1
3	October 26	Toronto	W 112–101	Edwards, Randle (24)	Rudy Gobert (12)	Mike Conley (6)	Target Center; 18,978	2–1
4	October 29	Dallas	L 114–120	Anthony Edwards (37)	Naz Reid (9)	Julius Randle (7)	Target Center; 18,978	2–2

November: 7–8 (home: 5–3; road: 2–5)

Game	Date	Team	Score	High points	High rebounds	High assists	Location Attendance	Record
5	November 1	Denver	W 119–116	Anthony Edwards (29)	Rudy Gobert (14)	Julius Randle (7)	Target Center; 18,978	3–2
6	November 2	@ San Antonio	L 103–113	Edwards, Randle (21)	Edwards, Randle (5)	Nickeil Alexander-Walker (6)	Frost Bank Center; 18,257	3–3
7	November 4	Charlotte	W 114–93	Naz Reid (25)	Naz Reid (9)	Conley, Gobert, Randle (4)	Target Center; 18,978	4–3
8	November 7	@ Chicago	W 135–119	Anthony Edwards (33)	Julius Randle (10)	Mike Conley (11)	United Center; 19,621	5–3
9	November 8	Portland	W 127–102	Anthony Edwards (27)	Rudy Gobert (15)	Donte DiVincenzo (7)	Target Center; 18,978	6–3
10	November 10	Miami	L 94–95	Anthony Edwards (22)	Rudy Gobert (13)	Edwards, Randle (6)	Target Center; 18,978	6–4
11	November 12	@ Portland	L 108–122	Naz Reid (28)	Rudy Gobert (8)	Mike Conley (6)	Moda Center; 16,880	6–5
12	November 13	@ Portland	L 98–106	Anthony Edwards (24)	Gobert, Randle (10)	Anthony Edwards (4)	Moda Center; 17,353	6–6
13	November 15	@ Sacramento	W 130–126 (OT)	Anthony Edwards (36)	Rudy Gobert (11)	Mike Conley (7)	Golden 1 Center; 16,478	7–6
14	November 17	Phoenix	W 120–117	Julius Randle (35)	Rudy Gobert (10)	Julius Randle (7)	Target Center; 18,978	8–6
15	November 21	@ Toronto	L 105–110	Anthony Edwards (26)	Rudy Gobert (11)	Donte DiVincenzo (4)	Scotiabank Arena; 19,296	8–7
16	November 24	@ Boston	L 105–107	Anthony Edwards (28)	Rudy Gobert (20)	Anthony Edwards (7)	TD Garden; 19,156	8–8
17	November 26	Houston	L 111–117	Anthony Edwards (29)	Rudy Gobert (16)	Rob Dillingham (7)	Target Center; 18,978	8–9
18	November 27	Sacramento	L 104–115	Anthony Edwards (29)	Julius Randle (9)	Anthony Edwards (5)	Target Center; 18,978	8–10
19	November 29	L.A. Clippers	W 93–92	Anthony Edwards (21)	Rudy Gobert (12)	DiVincenzo, McDaniels (5)	Target Center; 18,978	9–10

December: 8–5 (home: 3–2; road: 5–3)

Game	Date	Team	Score	High points	High rebounds	High assists	Location Attendance	Record
20	December 2	L.A. Lakers	W 109–80	Julius Randle (18)	Rudy Gobert (12)	Donte DiVincenzo (9)	Target Center; 18,978	10–10
21	December 4	@ L.A. Clippers	W 108–80	Julius Randle (20)	Rudy Gobert (9)	Rudy Gobert (7)	Intuit Dome; 15,111	11–10
22	December 6	@ Golden State	W 107–90	Anthony Edwards (30)	Rudy Gobert (11)	Anthony Edwards (9)	Chase Center; 18,064	12–10
23	December 8	@ Golden State	L 106–114	Anthony Edwards (27)	Julius Randle (11)	Anthony Edwards (6)	Chase Center; 18,064	12–11
24	December 13	L.A. Lakers	W 97–87	Anthony Edwards (23)	Rudy Gobert (13)	Mike Conley (7)	Target Center; 18,978	13–11
25	December 15	@ San Antonio	W 106–92	Anthony Edwards (26)	Jaden McDaniels (11)	Mike Conley (8)	Frost Bank Center; 16,816	14–11
26	December 19	New York	L 107–133	Julius Randle (24)	DiVincenzo, McDaniels (6)	Anthony Edwards (7)	Target Center; 18,978	14–12
27	December 21	Golden State	L 103–113	DiVincenzo, Edwards (19)	Rudy Gobert (12)	Julius Randle (6)	Target Center; 18,978	14–13
28	December 23	@ Atlanta	L 104–117	Naz Reid (23)	Julius Randle (13)	Julius Randle (7)	State Farm Arena; 17,051	14–14
29	December 25	@ Dallas	W 105–99	Anthony Edwards (26)	Gobert, Randle (10)	Julius Randle (8)	American Airlines Center; 20,341	15–14
30	December 27	@ Houston	W 113–112	Julius Randle (27)	Rudy Gobert (9)	Julius Randle (8)	Toyota Center; 18,055	16–14
31	December 29	San Antonio	W 112–110	Donte DiVincenzo (26)	Rudy Gobert (15)	DiVincenzo, Edwards, Randle (4)	Target Center; 18,978	17–14
32	December 31	@ Oklahoma City	L 105–113	Anthony Edwards (20)	Naz Reid (8)	Julius Randle (6)	Paycom Center; 18,203	17–15

January: 10–6 (home: 3–4; road: 7–2)

Game	Date	Team	Score	High points	High rebounds	High assists	Location Attendance	Record
33	January 2	Boston	L 115–118	Julius Randle (27)	McDaniels, Randle (8)	Julius Randle (7)	Target Center; 18,978	17–16
34	January 4	@ Detroit	L 105–119	Anthony Edwards (53)	Julius Randle (7)	Julius Randle (6)	Little Caesars Arena; 20,062	17–17
35	January 6	L.A. Clippers	W 108–106	Anthony Edwards (37)	Rudy Gobert (18)	Anthony Edwards (8)	Target Center; 18,978	18–17
36	January 7	@ New Orleans	W 104–97	Anthony Edwards (32)	Rudy Gobert (14)	Donte DiVincenzo (7)	Smoothie King Center; 16,282	19–17
37	January 9	@ Orlando	W 104–89	Julius Randle (23)	Rudy Gobert (12)	Anthony Edwards (7)	Kia Center; 18,846	20–17
38	January 11	Memphis	L 125–127	Donte DiVincenzo (27)	Donte DiVincenzo (10)	Julius Randle (8)	Target Center; 18,978	20–18
39	January 13	@ Washington	W 120–106	Anthony Edwards (41)	Rudy Gobert (11)	Anthony Edwards (7)	Capital One Arena; 14,386	21–18
40	January 15	Golden State	L 115–116	DiVincenzo, Edwards (28)	Rudy Gobert (10)	Donte DiVincenzo (9)	Target Center; 18,978	21–19
41	January 17	@ New York	W 116–99	Anthony Edwards (36)	Anthony Edwards (13)	Anthony Edwards (7)	Madison Square Garden; 19,812	22–19
42	January 18	Cleveland	L 117–124	Anthony Edwards (28)	Julius Randle (14)	Julius Randle (9)	Target Center; 18,978	22–20
43	January 20	@ Memphis	L 106–108	Anthony Edwards (32)	Jaden McDaniels (12)	Mike Conley (8)	FedExForum; 17,794	22–21
44	January 22	@ Dallas	W 115–114	Jaden McDaniels (27)	Jaden McDaniels (8)	Mike Conley (8)	American Airlines Center; 20,025	23–21
45	January 25	Denver	W 133–104	Anthony Edwards (34)	Rudy Gobert (14)	Anthony Edwards (9)	Target Center; 18,978	24–21
46	January 27	Atlanta	W 100–92	Anthony Edwards (23)	Rudy Gobert (10)	Conley, Edwards (4)	Target Center; 18,978	25–21
47	January 29	@ Phoenix	W 121–113	Anthony Edwards (33)	Edwards, Randle (7)	Conley, Randle (6)	Footprint Center; 17,071	26–21
48	January 30	@ Utah	W 138–113	Anthony Edwards (36)	Rudy Gobert (9)	Anthony Edwards (11)	Delta Center; 18,175	27–21

February: 5–8 (home: 4–4; road: 1–4)

Game	Date	Team	Score	High points	High rebounds	High assists	Location Attendance	Record
49	February 1	Washington	L 103–105	Jaden McDaniels (23)	Rudy Gobert (16)	Rob Dillingham (7)	Target Center; 18,978	27–22
50	February 3	Sacramento	L 114–116	Naz Reid (30)	Rudy Gobert (13)	Mike Conley (9)	Target Center; 18,978	27–23
51	February 5	Chicago	W 127–108	Anthony Edwards (49)	Rudy Gobert (15)	Mike Conley (9)	Target Center; 18,978	28–23
52	February 6	Houston	W 127–114	Anthony Edwards (41)	Naz Reid (11)	Anthony Edwards (6)	Target Center; 18,978	29–23
53	February 8	Portland	W 114–98	Jaden McDaniels (30)	Rudy Gobert (11)	Alexander-Walker, Dillingham (6)	Target Center; 18,978	30–23
54	February 10	@ Cleveland	L 107–128	Anthony Edwards (44)	Rudy Gobert (8)	Naz Reid (4)	Rocket Mortgage FieldHouse; 19,432	30–24
55	February 12	Milwaukee	L 101–103	Anthony Edwards (28)	Rudy Gobert (14)	Terrence Shannon Jr. (6)	Target Center; 18,978	30–25
56	February 13	Oklahoma City	W 116–101	Naz Reid (27)	Naz Reid (14)	Edwards, Reid (7)	Target Center; 18,978	31–25
All-Star Game
57	February 21	@ Houston	L 115–121	Anthony Edwards (37)	Naz Reid (8)	Mike Conley (5)	Toyota Center; 18,055	31–26
58	February 23	Oklahoma City	L 123–130	Anthony Edwards (29)	Jaden McDaniels (13)	Anthony Edwards (7)	Target Center; 18,978	31–27
59	February 24	@ Oklahoma City	W 131–128 (OT)	Jaden McDaniels (27)	Anthony Edwards (13)	Anthony Edwards (8)	Paycom Center; 18,203	32–27
60	February 27	@ L.A. Lakers	L 102–111	Terrence Shannon Jr. (25)	Naz Reid (12)	Donte DiVincenzo (6)	Crypto.com Arena; 18,997	32–28
61	February 28	@ Utah	L 116–117	Naz Reid (27)	Naz Reid (11)	Mike Conley (6)	Delta Center; 18,175	32–29

March: 11–3 (home: 7–2; road: 4–1)

Game	Date	Team	Score	High points	High rebounds	High assists	Location Attendance	Record
62	March 2	@ Phoenix	W 116–98	Anthony Edwards (44)	Naz Reid (10)	Anthony Edwards (7)	PHX Arena; 17,071	33–29
63	March 4	Philadelphia	W 126–112	Naz Reid (23)	Julius Randle (8)	Donte DiVincenzo (8)	Target Center; 17,297	34–29
64	March 5	@ Charlotte	W 125–110	Edwards, McDaniels (29)	McDaniels, Randle, Reid (10)	Julius Randle (9)	Spectrum Center; 17,578	35–29
65	March 7	@ Miami	W 106–104	Conley, DiVincenzo, Reid (15)	Anthony Edwards (13)	Julius Randle (9)	Kaseya Center; 19,700	36–29
66	March 9	San Antonio	W 141–124	Anthony Edwards (25)	Rudy Gobert (8)	Julius Randle (10)	Target Center; 17,875	37–29
67	March 12	@ Denver	W 115–95	Anthony Edwards (29)	Rudy Gobert (10)	DiVincenzo, Edwards (6)	Ball Arena; 19,832	38–29
68	March 14	Orlando	W 118–111	Anthony Edwards (28)	Rudy Gobert (12)	DiVincenzo, Edwards, Randle (5)	Target Center; 18,978	39–29
69	March 16	Utah	W 128–102	Anthony Edwards (41)	Jaden McDaniels (12)	Donte DiVincenzo (7)	Target Center; 18,978	40–29
70	March 17	Indiana	L 130–132 (OT)	Anthony Edwards (38)	Nickeil Alexander-Walker (9)	Conley, Edwards (5)	Target Center; 17,955	40–30
71	March 19	New Orleans	L 115–119	Anthony Edwards (29)	Rudy Gobert (9)	Edwards, McDaniels, Reid (4)	Target Center; 16,936	40–31
72	March 21	New Orleans	W 134–93	Julius Randle (20)	Rudy Gobert (11)	Conley, Reid (6)	Target Center; 18,978	41–31
73	March 24	@ Indiana	L 103–119	Naz Reid (20)	Rudy Gobert (16)	Mike Conley (5)	Gainbridge Fieldhouse; 17,274	41–32
74	March 28	Phoenix	W 124–109	Julius Randle (25)	Rudy Gobert (13)	Julius Randle (8)	Target Center; 18,978	42–32
75	March 30	Detroit	W 123–104	Julius Randle (26)	Rudy Gobert (25)	Julius Randle (5)	Target Center; 18,978	43–32

April: 6–1 (home: 2–0; road: 4–1)

Game	Date	Team	Score	High points	High rebounds	High assists	Location Attendance	Record
76	April 1	@ Denver	W 140–139 (2OT)	Anthony Edwards (34)	Rudy Gobert (12)	Alexander-Walker, Conley, Edwards (8)	Ball Arena; 19,927	44–32
77	April 3	@ Brooklyn	W 105–90	Anthony Edwards (28)	Rudy Gobert (18)	Mike Conley (6)	Barclays Center; 17,926	45–32
78	April 5	@ Philadelphia	W 114–109	Anthony Edwards (37)	Rudy Gobert (19)	Nickeil Alexander-Walker (5)	Wells Fargo Center; 19,755	46–32
79	April 8	@ Milwaukee	L 103–110	Anthony Edwards (25)	Rudy Gobert (9)	Julius Randle (6)	Fiserv Forum; 17,341	46–33
80	April 10	@ Memphis	W 141–125	Anthony Edwards (44)	Julius Randle (10)	Mike Conley (9)	FedExForum; 17,007	47–33
81	April 11	Brooklyn	W 117–91	Rudy Gobert (35)	Rudy Gobert (11)	Anthony Edwards (5)	Target Center; 18,978	48–33
82	April 13	Utah	W 116–105	Anthony Edwards (43)	Rudy Gobert (17)	Nickeil Alexander-Walker (7)	Target Center; 18,978	49–33

2024–25 season schedule

=== Playoffs ===
2025 playoff game log
Total: 9–6 (home: 5–2; road: 4–4)
First Round: 4–1 (home: 2–0; road: 2–1)

Game	Date	Team	Score	High points	High rebounds	High assists	Location Attendance	Series
1	April 19	@ L.A. Lakers	W 117–95	Jaden McDaniels (25)	Jaden McDaniels (9)	Anthony Edwards (9)	Crypto.com Arena; 18,997	1–0
2	April 22	@ L.A. Lakers	L 85–94	Julius Randle (27)	Conley, Edwards, Gobert (6)	Julius Randle (6)	Crypto.com Arena; 18,997	1–1
3	April 25	L.A. Lakers	W 116–104	Jaden McDaniels (30)	Anthony Edwards (8)	Anthony Edwards (8)	Target Center; 19,312	2–1
4	April 27	L.A. Lakers	W 116–113	Anthony Edwards (43)	Jaden McDaniels (11)	Anthony Edwards (6)	Target Center; 19,289	3–1
5	April 30	@ L.A. Lakers	W 103–96	Rudy Gobert (27)	Rudy Gobert (24)	Anthony Edwards (8)	Crypto.com Arena; 18,997	4–1

Conference Semifinals: 4–1 (home: 2–1; road: 2–0)

Game	Date	Team	Score	High points	High rebounds	High assists	Location Attendance	Series
1	May 6	Golden State	L 88–99	Anthony Edwards (23)	Anthony Edwards (14)	Julius Randle (6)	Target Center; 19,223	0–1
2	May 8	Golden State	W 117–93	Julius Randle (24)	Edwards, Gobert (9)	Julius Randle (11)	Target Center; 18,978	1–1
3	May 10	@ Golden State	W 102–97	Anthony Edwards (36)	Rudy Gobert (13)	Julius Randle (12)	Chase Center; 18,064	2–1
4	May 12	@ Golden State	W 117–110	Julius Randle (31)	Jaden McDaniels (13)	Conley, Edwards (5)	Chase Center; 18,064	3–1
5	May 14	Golden State	W 121–110	Julius Randle (29)	Gobert, Randle (8)	Anthony Edwards (12)	Target Center; 19,395	4–1

Conference Finals: 1–4 (home: 1–1; road: 0–3)

Game	Date	Team	Score	High points	High rebounds	High assists	Location Attendance	Series
1	May 20	@ Oklahoma City	L 88–114	Julius Randle (28)	Anthony Edwards (9)	Naz Reid (4)	Paycom Center; 18,203	0–1
2	May 22	@ Oklahoma City	L 103–118	Anthony Edwards (32)	Edwards, Gobert (9)	Anthony Edwards (6)	Paycom Center; 18,203	0–2
3	May 24	Oklahoma City	W 143–101	Anthony Edwards (30)	Anthony Edwards (9)	Anthony Edwards (6)	Target Center; 19,112	1–2
4	May 26	Oklahoma City	L 126–128	Nickeil Alexander-Walker (23)	Rudy Gobert (9)	Alexander-Walker, Edwards (6)	Target Center; 19,250	1–3
5	May 28	@ Oklahoma City	L 94–124	Julius Randle (24)	DiVincenzo, Edwards (6)	Alexander-Walker, Randle (3)	Paycom Center; 18,203	1–4

2025 playoff schedule

=== NBA Cup ===
The groups were revealed during the tournament announcement on July 12, 2024.

==== West Group A ====
Pos	Team	Pld	W	L	PF	PA	PD	Qualification
1	Houston Rockets	4	3	1	454	414	+40	Advance to knockout stage
2	Los Angeles Clippers	4	2	2	427	411	+16	
3	Minnesota Timberwolves	4	2	2	418	431	−13	
4	Portland Trail Blazers	4	2	2	430	457	−27	
5	Sacramento Kings	4	1	3	429	445	−16	

Source: NBA
Rules for classification: Tiebreakers

== Player statistics ==
=== Regular season ===
Player	POS	GP	GS	MP	REB	AST	STL	BLK	PTS	MPG	RPG	APG	SPG	BPG	PPG
Nickeil Alexander-Walker	SG	82	10	2,073	265	233	50	34	773	25.3	3.2	2.7	.6	.4	9.4
Jaden McDaniels	PF	82	82	2,614	470	163	110	74	1,000	31.9	5.7	2.0	1.3	.9	12.2
Naz Reid	C	80	17	2,200	480	181	58	72	1,138	27.5	6.0	2.3	.7	.9	14.2
Anthony Edwards	SG	79	79	2,871	450	359	91	51	2,177	36.3	5.7	4.5	1.2	.6	27.6
Rudy Gobert	C	72	72	2,388	785	127	56	104	866	33.2	10.9	1.8	.8	1.4	12.0
Mike Conley	PG	71	64	1,756	182	319	79	14	582	24.7	2.6	4.5	1.1	.2	8.2
Julius Randle	PF	69	69	2,226	487	323	47	16	1,288	32.3	7.1	4.7	.7	.2	18.7
Donte DiVincenzo	SG	62	10	1,606	228	225	73	17	723	25.9	3.7	3.6	1.2	.3	11.7
Rob Dillingham	PG	49	1	516	50	98	20	1	219	10.5	1.0	2.0	.4	.0	4.5
Josh Minott	SF	46	0	276	47	18	15	12	119	6.0	1.0	.4	.3	.3	2.6
Jaylen Clark	SG	40	4	522	53	26	36	2	163	13.1	1.3	.7	.9	.1	4.1
Luka Garza	C	39	0	219	54	11	6	3	138	5.6	1.4	.3	.2	.1	3.5
Terrence Shannon Jr.	SG	32	1	339	47	32	7	5	138	10.6	1.5	1.0	.2	.2	4.3
Joe Ingles	SF	19	1	114	11	23	2	0	15	6.0	.6	1.2	.1	.0	.8
Leonard Miller	SF	13	0	32	11	0	2	1	20	2.5	.8	.0	.2	.1	1.5
PJ Dozier	SG	9	0	24	5	5	1	0	7	3.9	.6	.6	.1	.0	.8
Bones Hyland^{†}	PG	4	0	17	1	4	0	0	5	4.3	.3	1.0	.0	.0	1.3
Daishen Nix	PG	3	0	13	4	3	0	0	1	4.3	1.3	1.0	.0	.0	.3
Tristen Newton^{†}	SG	3	0	8	4	1	1	0	0	2.7	1.3	.3	.3	.0	.0
Jesse Edwards	C	2	0	5	0	1	0	0	0	2.5	.0	.5	.0	.0	.0

- ^{†} Denotes player spent time with another team in the season. Stats reflect time with the Timberwolves only.

=== Playoffs ===
Player	POS	GP	GS	MP	REB	AST	STL	BLK	PTS	MPG	RPG	APG	SPG	BPG	PPG
Nickeil Alexander-Walker	SG	15	0	310	27	35	6	5	125	20.7	1.8	2.3	.4	.3	8.3
Mike Conley	PG	15	15	356	44	50	9	3	90	23.7	2.9	3.3	.6	.2	6.0
Donte DiVincenzo	SG	15	0	377	46	50	21	4	130	25.1	3.1	3.3	1.4	.3	8.7
Anthony Edwards	SG	15	15	585	117	82	17	11	380	39.0	7.8	5.5	1.1	.7	25.3
Rudy Gobert	C	15	15	411	129	11	8	18	118	27.4	8.6	.7	.5	1.2	7.9
Jaden McDaniels	PF	15	15	497	84	23	19	13	220	33.1	5.6	1.5	1.3	.9	14.7
Julius Randle	PF	15	15	497	84	23	19	13	220	33.1	5.6	1.5	1.3	.9	14.7
Naz Reid	C	15	0	375	71	25	11	14	156	25.0	4.7	1.7	.7	.9	10.4
Terrence Shannon Jr.	SG	9	0	57	10	3	4	0	41	6.3	1.1	.3	.4	.0	4.6
Jaylen Clark	SG	5	0	28	7	1	2	0	11	5.6	1.4	.2	.4	.0	2.2
Luka Garza	C	5	0	19	3	0	0	0	13	3.8	.6	.0	.0	.0	2.6
Josh Minott	SF	5	0	23	0	2	0	1	5	4.6	.0	.4	.0	.2	1.0
Rob Dillingham	PG	3	0	16	2	7	0	0	8	5.3	.7	2.3	.0	.0	2.7
Leonard Miller	SF	3	0	13	5	0	0	0	13	4.3	1.7	.0	.0	.0	4.3

== Transactions ==
=== Trades ===
June 26, 2024	To Minnesota Timberwolves Draft rights to Rob Dillingham (No. 8)	To San Antonio Spurs 2030 MIN protected first-round pick swap right 2031 MIN first-round pick
July 6, 2024	Four-team trade
July 6, 2024	To Minnesota Timberwolves Future second-round pick (from Memphis); Cash considerations (from Toronto)	To Detroit Pistons Wendell Moore Jr. (from Minnesota); Draft rights to Bobi Klintman (No. 37) (from Minnesota)
July 6, 2024	To Memphis Grizzlies Draft rights to Cam Spencer (No. 53) (from Detroit)	To Toronto Raptors Draft rights to Ulrich Chomche (No. 57) (from Memphis)
July 6, 2024	Six-team trade
July 6, 2024	To Minnesota Timberwolves 2025 DEN second-round pick (from Golden State via Charlotte); 2031 second-round pick swap (from Golden State); Cash considerations (from Golden State)	To Charlotte Hornets Josh Green (from Dallas); Reggie Jackson (from Denver); 2029 DEN second-round pick (from Denver); 2030 DEN second-round pick (from Denver)
July 6, 2024	To Dallas Mavericks Klay Thompson (from Golden State); 2025 GSW second-round pick (from Golden State)	To Denver Nuggets Cash considerations (from Charlotte)
July 6, 2024	To Golden State Warriors Kyle Anderson (from Minnesota); Buddy Hield (from Philadelphia)	To Philadelphia 76ers 2031 DAL second-round pick (from Golden State via Dallas)
October 2, 2024	Three-team trade
October 2, 2024	To Minnesota Timberwolves Keita Bates-Diop (from New York); Donte DiVincenzo (from New York); Julius Randle (from New York); 2025 DET first-round pick (from New York)	To New York Knicks Karl-Anthony Towns (from Minnesota); Draft rights to James Nnaji (2023 No. 31) (from Charlotte)
October 2, 2024	To Charlotte Hornets Charlie Brown Jr. (from New York); DaQuan Jeffries (from New York); Duane Washington Jr. (from New York); 2025 MIN second-round pick (from Minnesota); 2026 GSW second-round pick (from New York); 2031 NYK second-round pick (from New York); Cash considerations (from New York)

=== Free agency ===
==== Re-signed ====
Date	Player	Ref.
July 6	Luka Garza	

==== Additions ====
Date	Player	Former Team	Ref.
July 6	Joe Ingles	Orlando Magic	

==== Subtractions ====
Date	Player	Reason	New Team	Ref.
July 5	Monté Morris	Free agency	Phoenix Suns	
