= Keshad Johnson =

American basketball player (born 2001)

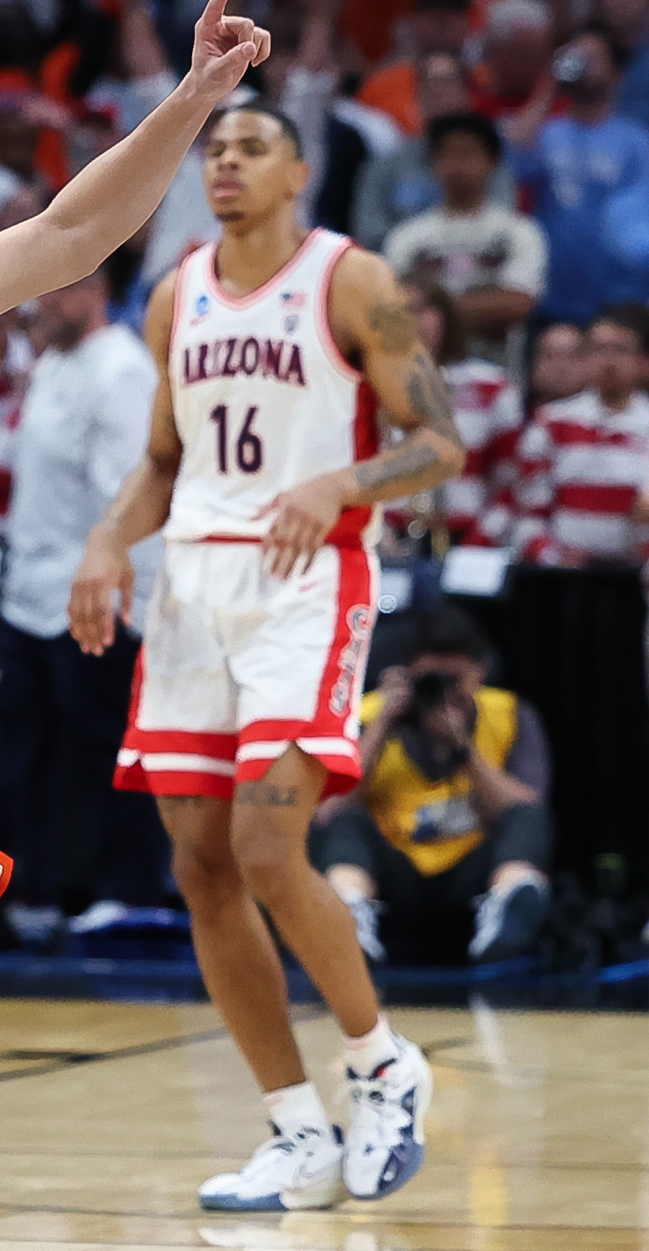
- Johnson with Arizona in 2024

No. 16 – Miami Heat
- Position: Small forward
- League: NBA

Personal information
- Born: June 23, 2001 (age 25) Oakland, California, U.S.
- Listed height: 6 ft 6 in (1.98 m)
- Listed weight: 225 lb (102 kg)

Career information
- High school: Envision Academy (Oakland, California); San Leandro (San Leandro, California)
- College: San Diego State (2019–2023); Arizona (2023–2024)
- NBA draft: 2024: undrafted
- Playing career: 2024–present

Career history
- 2024–present: Miami Heat
- 2024–2025, 2026–present: →Sioux Falls Skyforce

Career highlights
- NBA Slam Dunk Contest champion (2026)
- Stats at NBA.com
- Stats at Basketball Reference

Keshad Ray Johnson (born June 23, 2001) is an American professional basketball player for the Miami Heat of the National Basketball Association (NBA), on a two-way contract with the Sioux Falls Skyforce of the NBA G League. He played college basketball for the San Diego State Aztecs and Arizona Wildcats.

== Early life and high school career ==
Johnson grew up in Oakland, California, and initially attended Envision Academy of Arts & Technology. He transferred to San Leandro High School before his senior season. Johnson averaged 14.4 points, eight rebounds, three assists, 2.3 blocks and 1.9 steals per game and was named the West Alameda County Conference Foothill League co-MVP in his lone season at San Leandro. He committed to playing college basketball for San Diego State.

== College career ==
Johnson began his college career at San Diego State. Johnson averaged 7.2 points and 4.5 rebounds per game as a junior. He averaged 7.7 points and five rebounds per game during his senior season. After the season, Johnson decided to utilize the extra year of eligibility granted to college athletes who played in the 2020 season due to COVID-19 pandemic and entered the NCAA transfer portal.

During his 2022-2023 Senior year with SDSU, Keshad was a major contributor to the team that made the Final Four in Houston, ultimately losing in the Championship game to UConn.

Johnson transferred to Arizona. He averaged 11.5 points, 5.9 rebounds, 1.8 assists, 0.7 blocks and 1.0 steals per game.

== Professional career ==
After going undrafted in the 2024 NBA draft, Johnson signed a two-way contract with the Miami Heat on July 1, 2024 and joined them for the 2024 NBA Summer League. On December 26, he signed a standard contract with the Heat and on January 24, 2025, he was assigned to the Sioux Falls Skyforce.

Johnson won the Slam Dunk Contest during the 2026 NBA All-Star Weekend. He was noted for his various dance moves he performed between dunks.

On August 27, 2026, Johnson re-signed with the Heat on a two-way contract.

== Career statistics ==
Legend
GP	Games played	GS	Games started	MPG	Minutes per game
FG%	Field goal percentage	3P%	3-point field goal percentage	FT%	Free throw percentage
RPG	Rebounds per game	APG	Assists per game	SPG	Steals per game
BPG	Blocks per game	PPG	Points per game	**Bold**	Career high

=== NBA ===
==== Regular season ====
Year	Team	GP	GS	MPG	FG%	3P%	FT%	RPG	APG	SPG	BPG	PPG
2024–25	Miami	16	0	6.1	**.692**	**.429**	.444	1.8	**.3**	.3	**.3**	2.7
2025–26	Miami	**32**	0	**8.8**	.490	.295	**.724**	**1.9**	**.3**	**.5**	**.3**	**4.3**
Career		48	0	7.9	.531	.314	.658	1.9	.3	.4	.3	3.7

==== Playoffs ====
Year	Team	GP	GS	MPG	FG%	3P%	FT%	RPG	APG	SPG	BPG	PPG
2025	Miami	2	0	4.0	1.000	–	–	.5	.0	.0	.0	1.0
Career		2	0	4.0	1.000	–	–	.5	.0	.0	.0	1.0

=== College ===
Year	Team	GP	GS	MPG	FG%	3P%	FT%	RPG	APG	SPG	BPG	PPG
2019–20	San Diego State	18	0	5.9	.353	.222	.375	1.7	.2	.3	.1	1.9
2020–21	San Diego State	24	0	13.5	.452	.333	.550	3.6	.7	.3	.5	4.0
2021–22	San Diego State	32	32	23.8	**.553**	.182	.644	4.5	1.0	.7	.6	7.2
2022–23	San Diego State	**39**	**39**	22.2	.532	.262	.648	5.0	.7	.5	.5	7.7
2023–24	Arizona	36	36	**27.6**	.530	**.387**	**.710**	**5.9**	**1.8**	**1.0**	**.7**	**11.5**
Career		149	107	20.5	.520	.309	.642	4.5	1.0	.6	.5	7.2
