= Kel'el Ware =

American basketball player (born 2004)

No. 9 – Milwaukee Bucks
- Position: Center
- League: NBA

Personal information
- Born: April 20, 2004 (age 22) North Little Rock, Arkansas, U.S.
- Listed height: 7 ft 0 in (2.13 m)
- Listed weight: 230 lb (104 kg)

Career information
- High school: North Little Rock (North Little Rock, Arkansas)
- College: Oregon (2022–2023); Indiana (2023–2024)
- NBA draft: 2024: 1st round, 15th overall pick
- Drafted by: Miami Heat
- Playing career: 2024–present

Career history
- 2024–2026: Miami Heat
- 2024: →Sioux Falls Skyforce
- 2026–present: Milwaukee Bucks

Career highlights
- NBA All-Rookie Second Team (2025); Second-team All-Big Ten (2024); Big Ten All-Defensive Team (2024); McDonald's All-American (2022); Nike Hoop Summit (2022)
- Stats at NBA.com
- Stats at Basketball Reference
Medals
Men's basketball
Representing the United States
FIBA Americas Under-18 Championship
Gold medal – first place	2022 Mexico	Team

Kel'el Ware (/kəˈlɛl wɛər/ kə-LELL wair; born April 20, 2004) is an American basketball player for the Milwaukee Bucks of the National Basketball Association (NBA). He played college basketball for the Oregon Ducks and the Indiana Hoosiers.

== Early life and high school career ==
Kel’el Ware was born on April 20, 2004, in North Little Rock, Arkansas, and attended North Little Rock High School from 2018 to 2022. As a junior, he averaged 16.2 points, 9.1 rebounds and 4.1 blocks per game. As a senior, Ware averaged 20.3 points, 12 rebounds and 5.7 blocks per game. He also played in the Jordan Brand Classic, Nike Hoop Summit and the 2022 McDonald's All-American Boys Game during his senior year.

=== Recruiting ===
Ware was a consensus five-star recruit and one of the top players in the 2022 class, according to major recruiting services. On August 9, 2021, he committed to playing college basketball for Oregon over offers from Arkansas, Auburn, Baylor, Illinois, Kansas, Memphis, Texas A&M and Texas Tech. Ware was also offered a two-year contract for $900,000 from Overtime Elite, but he declined the offer and maintained his commitment to Oregon.

College recruiting
Name	Hometown	School	Height	Weight	Commit date
Kel'el Ware; C	North Little Rock, AR	North Little Rock (AR)	7 ft 0 in (2.13 m)	210 lb (95 kg)	Aug 9, 2021
Kel'el Ware; C	Recruit ratings: Rivals: 247Sports: ESPN: (93)				
Overall recruit ranking: Rivals: 7 247Sports: 7 ESPN: 8
Note: In many cases, Scout, Rivals, 247Sports, On3, and ESPN may conflict in their listings of height and weight.; In these cases, the average was taken. ESPN grades are on a 100-point scale.; Sources: "Oregon 2022 Basketball Commitments". Rivals.; "2022 Oregon Ducks Recruiting Class". ESPN.; "2022 Team Ranking". Rivals.

== College career ==
Ware entered his freshman season at Oregon as the Ducks' second center. He also entered the season as a potential first-round selection in the 2023 NBA draft. After averaging 26 minutes played, 10.3 points, 5.6 rebounds and 1.4 blocks over the first nine games of the season, Ware saw a decline in playing time due to what Oregon's coaching staff believed to be an inconsistent work ethic. He ultimately averaged 6.6 points and 4.1 rebounds per game on the season. At the end of the season, Ware entered the NCAA transfer portal.

Ware ultimately transferred to Indiana. He started at center in the Hoosiers' season-opener against Florida Gulf Coast and recorded the first double-double of his college career with 13 points, 12 rebounds, four assists, three blocks and two steals as Indiana won 69–63. Ware set a new career high with 22 points scored while also grabbing 12 rebounds on November 16, 2023, in a 89–80 victory over Wright State. He re-set his career high in scoring with 28 points in a 89–76 win over Harvard. After the season, Ware declared for the 2024 NBA draft, forgoing his remaining college eligibility.

== Professional career ==
=== Miami Heat (2024–2026) ===
Ware was selected with the 15th overall pick by the Miami Heat in the 2024 NBA draft and on July 2, 2024, he signed with the Heat. Ware was named Eastern Conference Rookie of the Month for January 2025.

On November 11, 2025, Ware put up a career-high 20 rebounds in a 140–138 overtime win over the Cleveland Cavaliers. On December 21, Ware put up a career-high 28 points, along with 19 rebounds, in a 132–125 loss to the New York Knicks. On March 5, 2026, Ware put up 16 points, 11 rebounds, a career-high seven blocks and five steals in a 126–110 win over the Brooklyn Nets. He became the first player to put up a 10-10-5-5 game in Heat franchise history and the first to do so off the bench in NBA history. On April 4, Ware recorded 24 points, 19 rebounds and seven blocks in a 152–136 victory over the Washington Wizards. He made 77 appearances (34 starts) for Miami during the 2025–26 NBA season, logging averages of 11.1 points and 9.0 rebounds.

=== Milwaukee Bucks (2026–present) ===
On July 6, 2026, Ware, alongside Tyler Herro, Kasparas Jakučionis, Jaime Jaquez Jr., the rights to Nate Ament and four future draft picks, was traded to the Milwaukee Bucks in exchange for Giannis Antetokounmpo and Bobby Portis. On October 21, Ware made his Bucks debut, recording seven points and three assists in a 128–116 loss to the Washington Wizards.

== National team career ==
Ware played for the United States under-18 basketball team at the 2022 FIBA Under-18 Americas Championship. He was named to the All-Tournament team after averaging 15.7 points, 6.8 rebounds and 1.8 blocks as the United States won the gold medal.

== Personal life ==
Ware is the son of Tamika and Cedrick Spaight (stepfather). He has two brothers, Javarus Ware and Kashis Spaight and two sisters, Dyamyn Ware and Jazzmyn Spaight.

He is a Muslim.

His mother named him after Superman's Kryptonian name, Kal-El.

== Career statistics ==
Legend
GP	Games played	GS	Games started	MPG	Minutes per game
FG%	Field goal percentage	3P%	3-point field goal percentage	FT%	Free throw percentage
RPG	Rebounds per game	APG	Assists per game	SPG	Steals per game
BPG	Blocks per game	PPG	Points per game	**Bold**	Career high

=== NBA ===
==== Regular season ====
Year	Team	GP	GS	MPG	FG%	3P%	FT%	RPG	APG	SPG	BPG	PPG
2024–25	Miami	64	**36**	**22.2**	**.554**	.315	.687	7.4	**.9**	.6	**1.1**	9.3
2025–26	Miami	**77**	34	22.1	.530	**.395**	**.740**	**9.0**	.7	**.8**	**1.1**	**11.1**
Career		141	70	22.2	.540	.369	.718	8.3	.8	.7	1.1	10.3

==== Playoffs ====
Year	Team	GP	GS	MPG	FG%	3P%	FT%	RPG	APG	SPG	BPG	PPG
2025	Miami	4	4	18.3	.444	.273	–	4.8	1.0	.3	.5	4.8
Career		4	4	18.3	.444	.273	–	4.8	1.0	.3	.5	4.8

=== College ===
Year	Team	GP	GS	MPG	FG%	3P%	FT%	RPG	APG	SPG	BPG	PPG
2022–23	Oregon	**35**	4	15.8	.457	.273	**.712**	4.1	.5	.4	1.3	6.6
2023–24	Indiana	30	**30**	**32.2**	**.586**	**.425**	.634	**9.9**	**1.5**	**.6**	**1.9**	**15.9**
Career		65	34	23.3	.538	.337	.660	6.7	1.0	.5	1.6	10.9
