= 2024–25 Miami Heat season =

- Head coach: Erik Spoelstra
- President: Pat Riley
- General manager: Andy Elisburg
- Owner: Micky Arison
- Arena: Kaseya Center

Results
- Record: 37–45 (.451)
- Place: Division: 3rd (Southeast); Conference: 10th (Eastern)
- Playoff finish: First round (lost to Cavaliers 0–4)
- Stats at Basketball Reference

Local media
- Television: FanDuel Sports Network Sun
- Radio: WQAM

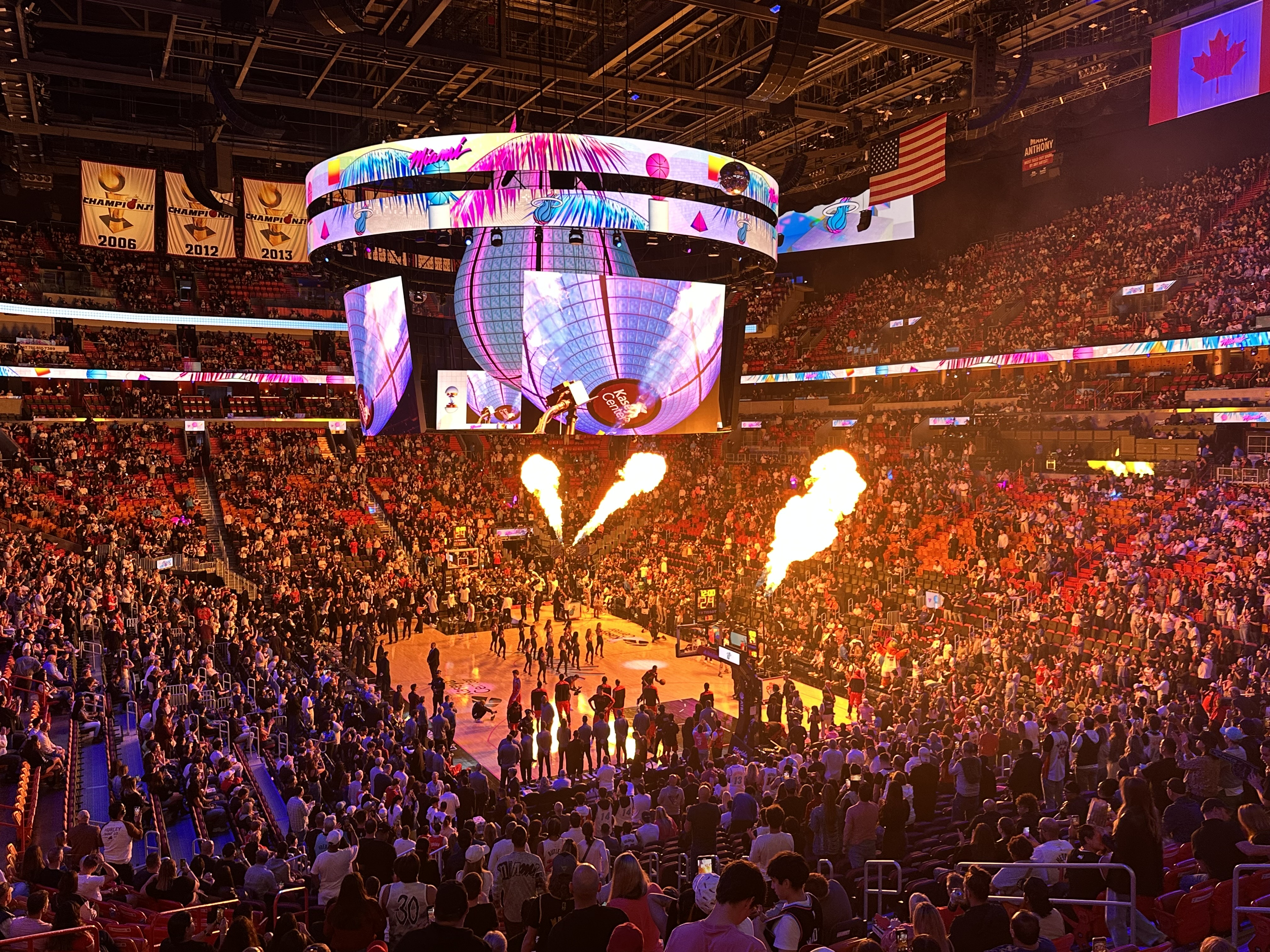
Kaseya Center prior to a Miami Heat game during the 2024-25 season.

The 2024–25 Miami Heat season was the 37th season for the franchise in the National Basketball Association (NBA).

On April 3, the Heat were locked in to a play-in berth following the Milwaukee Bucks' victory over the Philadelphia 76ers, but was the first season since 2018–19 with a sub-.500 campaign and they were unable to improve upon their 46–36 record from the previous season.

On April 18, the Heat became the first 10-seeded team to make the playoffs and clinched for the sixth season in a row, defeating the Chicago Bulls and the Atlanta Hawks in the Play-In Tournament to secure the eighth seed in the playoffs. However, the Heat were swept by the Cleveland Cavaliers in the first round of the playoffs. This is the second time in four years that the Heat were swept in the playoffs since 2021, which was also in the first round against the Milwaukee Bucks.

The Miami Heat drew an average home attendance of 19,715, the 6th-highest of all NBA teams.

== Draft ==
Round	Pick	Player	Position(s)	Nationality	College / club
1	15	Kel'el Ware	C	United States	Indiana
2	43	Nikola Đurišić	SG	Serbia	Mega Basket KSL and Adriatic League

The Heat entered the draft (which was two days instead of one like it had been since the NBA draft was shortened down to two rounds back in 1989) with one first-round pick and one second-round pick. On the first night of the draft, the Heat would select center Kel'el Ware from the University of Indiana as the 15th pick. Then, on the second day of the draft, Miami would select Serbian shooting guard Nikola Đurišić from the KK Mega Basket.

== Roster ==
2024–25 Miami Heat roster
Players

Pos.	No.	Player	Height	Weight	DOB	From
F/C	13	Bam Adebayo	6 ft 9 in (2.06 m)	260 lb (118 kg)	1997-07-18	Kentucky
F	20	Kyle Anderson	6 ft 9 in (2.06 m)	230 lb (104 kg)	1993-09-20	UCLA
G/F	18	Alec Burks	6 ft 5 in (1.96 m)	215 lb (98 kg)	1991-07-20	Colorado
G	8	Josh Christopher (TW)	6 ft 4 in (1.93 m)	215 lb (98 kg)	2001-12-08	Arizona State
G	14	Tyler Herro	6 ft 5 in (1.96 m)	205 lb (93 kg)	2000-01-20	Kentucky
F	24	Haywood Highsmith	6 ft 5 in (1.96 m)	215 lb (98 kg)	1996-12-09	Wheeling
F	11	Jaime Jaquez Jr.	6 ft 6 in (1.98 m)	230 lb (104 kg)	2001-02-18	UCLA
F	16	Keshad Johnson	6 ft 6 in (1.98 m)	230 lb (104 kg)	2001-06-23	Arizona
F	5	Nikola Jović	6 ft 10 in (2.08 m)	240 lb (109 kg)	2003-06-09	Serbia
G	9	Pelle Larsson	6 ft 5 in (1.96 m)	215 lb (98 kg)	2001-02-23	Arizona
F/C	42	Kevin Love	6 ft 8 in (2.03 m)	245 lb (111 kg)	1988-09-07	UCLA
G	45	Davion Mitchell	6 ft 0 in (1.83 m)	202 lb (92 kg)	1998-09-05	Baylor
G/F	55	Duncan Robinson	6 ft 7 in (2.01 m)	215 lb (98 kg)	1994-04-22	Michigan
G	2	Terry Rozier	6 ft 1 in (1.85 m)	195 lb (88 kg)	1994-03-17	Louisville
G	12	Dru Smith (injured) (TW)	6 ft 2 in (1.88 m)	200 lb (91 kg)	1997-12-30	Missouri
G	4	Isaiah Stevens (TW)	6 ft 0 in (1.83 m)	185 lb (84 kg)	2000-11-01	Colorado State
C	7	Kel'el Ware	7 ft 0 in (2.13 m)	240 lb (109 kg)	2004-04-20	Indiana
F	22	Andrew Wiggins	6 ft 8 in (2.03 m)	197 lb (89 kg)	1995-02-23	Kansas

Coaches
Head coach
- Erik Spoelstra
Assistant(s)
- Malik Allen
- Caron Butler
- Octavio De La Grana
- Wayne Ellington
- Eric Glass
- Chris Quinn

Legend
- (DP) Unsigned draft pick
- (FA) Free agent
- (S) Suspended
- (GL) On assignment to G League affiliate
- (TW) Two-way affiliate player
- Injured

Roster
Updated: February 6, 2025

== Standings ==
=== Division ===
Southeast Division	W	L	PCT	GB	Home	Road	Div	GP
y – Orlando Magic	41	41	.500	–	22‍–‍19	19‍–‍22	12‍–‍4	82
pi – Atlanta Hawks	40	42	.488	1.0	21‍–‍19	19‍–‍23	10‍–‍6	82
x – Miami Heat	37	45	.451	4.0	19‍–‍22	18‍–‍23	10‍–‍6	82
Charlotte Hornets	19	63	.232	22.0	12‍–‍29	7‍–‍34	1‍–‍15	82
Washington Wizards	18	64	.220	23.0	8‍–‍33	10‍–‍31	7‍–‍9	82

=== Conference ===
Eastern Conference
#	Team	W	L	PCT	GB	GP
1	c – Cleveland Cavaliers *	64	18	.780	–	82
2	y – Boston Celtics *	61	21	.744	3.0	82
3	x – New York Knicks	51	31	.622	13.0	82
4	x – Indiana Pacers	50	32	.610	14.0	82
5	x – Milwaukee Bucks	48	34	.585	16.0	82
6	x – Detroit Pistons	44	38	.537	20.0	82
7	y – Orlando Magic *	41	41	.500	23.0	82
8	pi – Atlanta Hawks	40	42	.488	24.0	82
9	pi – Chicago Bulls	39	43	.476	25.0	82
10	x – Miami Heat	37	45	.451	27.0	82
11	Toronto Raptors	30	52	.366	34.0	82
12	Brooklyn Nets	26	56	.317	38.0	82
13	Philadelphia 76ers	24	58	.293	40.0	82
14	Charlotte Hornets	19	63	.232	45.0	82
15	Washington Wizards	18	64	.220	46.0	82

== Game log ==
=== Preseason ===
During the preseason, the Heat would play their final games under what was previously named Bally Sports Sun. Bally Sports would rebrand itself to the FanDuel Sports Network as of October 21, 2024, before the start of the regular season.

2024 preseason game log
Total: 4–1 (Home: 3–0; Road: 1–1)
Preseason: 4–1 (home: 3–0; road: 1–1)

Game	Date	Team	Score	High points	High rebounds	High assists	Location Attendance	Record
1	October 8	@ Charlotte	L 108–111	Adebayo, Ware (13)	Caleb Daniels (9)	Josh Christopher (5)	Spectrum Center; 10,093	0–1
–	October 10	Atlanta	Postponed due to Hurricane Milton; Makeup date October 16					
2	October 13	New Orleans	W 101–99	Herro, Robinson (12)	Haywood Highsmith (7)	Dru Smith (5)	Kaseya Center; 19,600	1–1
3	October 15	San Antonio	W 120–117	Bam Adebayo (20)	Jaime Jaquez Jr. (6)	Jaquez Jr., Rozier, Smith (5)	Kaseya Center; 19,600	2–1
4	October 16	Atlanta	W 120–111	Jimmy Butler (24)	Bam Adebayo (7)	Tyler Herro (5)	Kaseya Center; 19,600	3–1
5	October 18	@ Memphis	W 114–109	Josh Christopher (17)	Kel'el Ware (7)	Isaiah Stevens (5)	FedExForum; 14,113	4–1

2024–25 preseason schedule

=== Regular season ===
2024–25 game log
Total: 37–45 (Home: 19–22; Road: 18–23)
October: 2–2 (home: 1–2; road: 1–0)

Game	Date	Team	Score	High points	High rebounds	High assists	Location Attendance	Record
1	October 23	Orlando	L 97–116	Terry Rozier (19)	Terry Rozier (6)	Butler, Rozier (5)	Kaseya Center; 19,630	0–1
2	October 26	@ Charlotte	W 114–106	Jimmy Butler (26)	Bam Adebayo (11)	Jimmy Butler (8)	Spectrum Center; 19,102	1–1
3	October 28	Detroit	W 106–98	Jimmy Butler (23)	Bam Adebayo (10)	Jimmy Butler (7)	Kaseya Center; 19,626	2–1
4	October 30	New York	L 107–116	Tyler Herro (34)	Jaime Jaquez Jr. (8)	Herro, Rozier (7)	Kaseya Center; 19,620	2–2

November: 7–6 (home: 3–2; road: 4–4)

Game	Date	Team	Score	High points	High rebounds	High assists	Location Attendance	Record
5	November 2	@ Washington	W 118–98	Bam Adebayo (32)	Bam Adebayo (14)	Butler, Rozier (4)	Mexico City Arena; 20,328	3–2
6	November 4	Sacramento	L 110–111	Butler, Herro (27)	Bam Adebayo (8)	Jimmy Butler (6)	Kaseya Center; 19,604	3–3
7	November 6	@ Phoenix	L 112–115	Tyler Herro (28)	Bam Adebayo (12)	Adebayo, Herro (6)	Footprint Center; 17,071	3–4
8	November 8	@ Denver	L 122–135	Tyler Herro (24)	Bam Adebayo (9)	Tyler Herro (11)	Ball Arena; 19,621	3–5
9	November 10	@ Minnesota	W 95–94	Tyler Herro (26)	Adebayo, Jović (7)	Bam Adebayo (7)	Target Center; 18,978	4–5
10	November 12	@ Detroit	L 121–123 (OT)	Tyler Herro (40)	Bam Adebayo (12)	Tyler Herro (8)	Little Caesars Arena; 17,806	4–6
11	November 15	@ Indiana	W 124–111	Bam Adebayo (30)	Bam Adebayo (11)	Bam Adebayo (7)	Gainbridge Fieldhouse; 17,274	5–6
12	November 17	@ Indiana	L 110–119	Tyler Herro (28)	Bam Adebayo (8)	Herro, Jaquez Jr., Robinson (4)	Gainbridge Fieldhouse; 16,184	5–7
13	November 18	Philadelphia	W 106–89	Jimmy Butler (30)	Bam Adebayo (13)	Butler, Herro (5)	Kaseya Center; 19,608	6–7
14	November 24	Dallas	W 123–118 (OT)	Jimmy Butler (33)	Adebayo, Love (11)	Jimmy Butler (6)	Kaseya Center; 19,714	7–7
15	November 26	Milwaukee	L 103–106	Jimmy Butler (23)	Adebayo, Herro, Robinson (5)	Adebayo, Butler, Herro, Robinson (5)	Kaseya Center; 19,622	7–8
16	November 27	@ Charlotte	W 98–94	Tyler Herro (27)	Bam Adebayo (10)	Bam Adebayo (10)	Spectrum Center; 17,710	8–8
17	November 29	Toronto	W 121–111	Jimmy Butler (26)	Bam Adebayo (10)	Bam Adebayo (10)	Kaseya Center; 19,607	9–8

December: 7–6 (home: 5–1; road: 2–5)

Game	Date	Team	Score	High points	High rebounds	High assists	Location Attendance	Record
18	December 1	@ Toronto	L 116–119	Tyler Herro (31)	Bam Adebayo (20)	Bam Adebayo (7)	Scotiabank Arena; 18,153	9–9
19	December 2	@ Boston	L 89–108	Herro, Jaquez Jr. (19)	Jaime Jaquez Jr. (10)	Adebayo, Highsmith (5)	TD Garden; 19,156	9–10
20	December 4	L.A. Lakers	W 134–93	Tyler Herro (31)	Bam Adebayo (10)	Bam Adebayo (7)	Kaseya Center; 19,657	10–10
21	December 7	Phoenix	W 121–111	Bam Adebayo (25)	Bam Adebayo (12)	Bam Adebayo (8)	Kaseya Center; 19,600	11–10
22	December 8	Cleveland	W 122–113	Tyler Herro (34)	Bam Adebayo (13)	Tyler Herro (7)	Kaseya Center; 19,600	12–10
23	December 12	Toronto	W 114–104	Tyler Herro (23)	Bam Adebayo (16)	Bam Adebayo (5)	Kaseya Center; 19,600	13–10
24	December 16	@ Detroit	L 124–125 (OT)	Jimmy Butler (35)	Jimmy Butler (19)	Jimmy Butler (10)	Little Caesars Arena; 17,810	13–11
25	December 20	Oklahoma City	L 97–104	Tyler Herro (28)	Tyler Herro (12)	Duncan Robinson (6)	Kaseya Center; 19,801	13–12
26	December 21	@ Orlando	L 114–121	Adebayo, Rozier (23)	Kel'el Ware (7)	Tyler Herro (5)	Kia Center; 18,080	13–13
27	December 23	Brooklyn	W 110–95	Bam Adebayo (23)	Tyler Herro (12)	Tyler Herro (9)	Kaseya Center; 19,832	14–13
28	December 26	@ Orlando	W 89–88	Tyler Herro (20)	Bam Adebayo (9)	Bam Adebayo (7)	Kia Center; 18,846	15–13
29	December 28	@ Atlanta	L 110–120	Tyler Herro (28)	Bam Adebayo (10)	Tyler Herro (10)	State Farm Arena; 17,856	15–14
30	December 29	@ Houston	W 104–100	Tyler Herro (27)	Bam Adebayo (10)	Tyler Herro (9)	Toyota Center; 18,055	16–14

January: 7–9 (home: 3–5; road: 4–4)

Game	Date	Team	Score	High points	High rebounds	High assists	Location Attendance	Record
31	January 1	New Orleans	W 119–108	Tyler Herro (32)	Bam Adebayo (9)	Bam Adebayo (10)	Kaseya Center; 20,013	17–14
32	January 2	Indiana	L 115–128	Kel'el Ware (25)	Bam Adebayo (8)	Terry Rozier (7)	Kaseya Center; 19,959	17–15
33	January 4	Utah	L 100–136	Nikola Jović (17)	Bam Adebayo (8)	Tyler Herro (6)	Kaseya Center; 19,934	17–16
34	January 6	@ Sacramento	L 118–123 (2OT)	Tyler Herro (26)	Adebayo, Jaquez Jr. (12)	Jaime Jaquez Jr. (10)	Golden 1 Center; 17,832	17–17
35	January 7	@ Golden State	W 114–98	Nikola Jović (20)	Bam Adebayo (9)	Duncan Robinson (8)	Chase Center; 18,064	18–17
36	January 9	@ Utah	W 97–92	Tyler Herro (23)	Adebayo, Burks, Herro, Jaquez Jr., Jović (7)	Jaime Jaquez Jr. (7)	Delta Center; 18,175	19–17
37	January 11	@ Portland	W 119–98	Tyler Herro (32)	Bam Adebayo (11)	Bam Adebayo (6)	Moda Center; 17,505	20–17
38	January 13	@ L.A. Clippers	L 98–109	Tyler Herro (32)	Kel'el Ware (13)	Tyler Herro (7)	Intuit Dome; 13,119	20–18
39	January 15	@ L.A. Lakers	L 108–117	Tyler Herro (34)	Kel'el Ware (11)	Nikola Jović (8)	Crypto.com Arena; 17,005	20–19
40	January 17	Denver	L 113–133	Tyler Herro (22)	Bam Adebayo (11)	Duncan Robinson (7)	Kaseya Center; 19,828	20–20
41	January 19	San Antonio	W 128–107	Kel'el Ware (25)	Bam Adebayo (11)	Butler, Herro (7)	Kaseya Center; 19,828	21–20
42	January 21	Portland	L 107–116	Duncan Robinson (22)	Kel'el Ware (15)	Butler, Jović (8)	Kaseya Center; 19,600	21–21
43	January 23	@ Milwaukee	L 96–125	Kel'el Ware (22)	Bam Adebayo (14)	Tyler Herro (9)	Fiserv Forum; 17,341	21–22
44	January 25	@ Brooklyn	W 106–97	Tyler Herro (25)	Bam Adebayo (16)	Tyler Herro (8)	Barclays Center; 17,962	22–22
45	January 27	Orlando	W 125–119 (2OT)	Tyler Herro (30)	Adebayo, Ware (10)	Tyler Herro (12)	Kaseya Center; 19,600	23–22
46	January 29	Cleveland	L 106–126	Herro, Rozier (22)	Bam Adebayo (9)	Tyler Herro (6)	Kaseya Center; 19,600	23–23

February: 5–7 (home: 2–1; road: 3–6)

Game	Date	Team	Score	High points	High rebounds	High assists	Location Attendance	Record
47	February 1	@ San Antonio	W 105–103	Bam Adebayo (30)	Adebayo, Ware (12)	Bam Adebayo (9)	Frost Bank Center; 18,354	24–23
48	February 4	@ Chicago	L 124–133	Adebayo, Herro (23)	Kel'el Ware (12)	Tyler Herro (9)	United Center; 19,389	24–24
49	February 5	@ Philadelphia	W 108–101	Tyler Herro (30)	Adebayo, Ware (13)	Herro, Jović (7)	Wells Fargo Center; 19,770	25–24
50	February 7	@ Brooklyn	L 86–102	Terry Rozier (20)	Kel'el Ware (14)	Tyler Herro (6)	Barclays Center; 17,926	25–25
51	February 10	Boston	L 85–103	Bam Adebayo (22)	Bam Adebayo (12)	Robinson, Wiggins (5)	Kaseya Center; 19,961	25–26
52	February 12	@ Oklahoma City	L 101–115	Bam Adebayo (27)	Bam Adebayo (15)	Tyler Herro (6)	Paycom Center; 17,835	25–27
53	February 13	@ Dallas	L 113–118	Tyler Herro (40)	Kyle Anderson (10)	Burks, Mitchell, Robinson (4)	American Airlines Center; 19,935	25–28
All-Star Game
54	February 21	@ Toronto	W 120–111 (OT)	Tyler Herro (28)	Bam Adebayo (12)	Tyler Herro (7)	Scotiabank Arena; 19,584	26–28
55	February 23	@ Milwaukee	L 113–120	Tyler Herro (40)	Kel'el Ware (12)	Tyler Herro (11)	Fiserv Forum; 17,442	26–29
56	February 24	@ Atlanta	L 86–98	Andrew Wiggins (23)	Kel'el Ware (15)	Herro, Ware (3)	State Farm Arena; 16,189	26–30
57	February 26	Atlanta	W 131–109	Herro, Robinson (24)	Bam Adebayo (9)	Tyler Herro (10)	Kaseya Center; 19,600	27–30
58	February 28	Indiana	W 125–120	Tyler Herro (29)	Kel'el Ware (12)	Davion Mitchell (8)	Kaseya Center; 19,850	28–30

March: 6–11 (home: 4–8; road: 2–3)

Game	Date	Team	Score	High points	High rebounds	High assists	Location Attendance	Record
59	March 2	New York	L 112–116 (OT)	Bam Adebayo (30)	Kel'el Ware (8)	Tyler Herro (7)	Kaseya Center; 19,725	28–31
60	March 3	Washington	W 106–90	Bam Adebayo (19)	Bam Adebayo (15)	Tyler Herro (6)	Kaseya Center; 19,600	29–31
61	March 5	@ Cleveland	L 107–112	Bam Adebayo (34)	Bam Adebayo (12)	Anderson, Mitchell (7)	Rocket Arena; 19,432	29–32
62	March 7	Minnesota	L 104–106	Bam Adebayo (29)	Bam Adebayo (13)	Davion Mitchell (10)	Kaseya Center; 19,700	29–33
63	March 8	Chicago	L 109–114	Adebayo, Wiggins (22)	Kel'el Ware (12)	Davion Mitchell (8)	Kaseya Center; 19,700	29–34
64	March 10	Charlotte	L 102–105	Bam Adebayo (23)	Bam Adebayo (14)	Bam Adebayo (8)	Kaseya Center; 19,600	29–35
65	March 12	L.A. Clippers	L 104–119	Tyler Herro (31)	Adebayo, Ware (7)	Adebayo, Herro (7)	Kaseya Center; 19,700	29–36
66	March 14	Boston	L 91–103	Andrew Wiggins (23)	Adebayo, Mitchell (9)	Tyler Herro (6)	Kaseya Center; 19,719	29–37
67	March 15	@ Memphis	L 91–125	Kel'el Ware (19)	Kel'el Ware (11)	Tyler Herro (7)	FedExForum; 17,794	29–38
68	March 17	@ New York	L 95–116	Duncan Robinson (22)	Jaime Jaquez Jr. (11)	Jaime Jaquez Jr. (7)	Madison Square Garden; 19,812	29–39
69	March 19	Detroit	L 113–116	Bam Adebayo (30)	Kel'el Ware (12)	Bam Adebayo (8)	Kaseya Center; 19,600	29–40
70	March 21	Houston	L 98–102	Andrew Wiggins (30)	Kel'el Ware (14)	Bam Adebayo (6)	Kaseya Center; 19,700	29–41
71	March 23	Charlotte	W 122–105	Andrew Wiggins (42)	Kel'el Ware (8)	Davion Mitchell (7)	Kaseya Center; 19,700	30–41
72	March 25	Golden State	W 112–86	Bam Adebayo (27)	Kel'el Ware (10)	Herro, Mitchell (7)	Kaseya Center; 19,897	31–41
73	March 27	Atlanta	W 122–112	Tyler Herro (36)	Kel'el Ware (12)	Davion Mitchell (6)	Kaseya Center; 19,700	32–41
74	March 29	@ Philadelphia	W 118–95	Tyler Herro (30)	Kel'el Ware (14)	Davion Mitchell (8)	Wells Fargo Center; 20,079	33–41
75	March 31	@ Washington	W 120–94	Bam Adebayo (28)	Bam Adebayo (12)	Terry Rozier (6)	Capital One Arena; 16,901	34–41

April: 3–4 (home: 1–3; road: 2–1)

Game	Date	Team	Score	High points	High rebounds	High assists	Location Attendance	Record
76	April 2	@ Boston	W 124–103	Tyler Herro (25)	Tyler Herro (6)	Tyler Herro (9)	TD Garden; 19,156	35–41
77	April 3	Memphis	L 108–110	Tyler Herro (35)	Kel'el Ware (15)	Davion Mitchell (7)	Kaseya Center; 19,700	35–42
78	April 5	Milwaukee	L 115–121 (OT)	Bam Adebayo (31)	Kyle Anderson (14)	Adebayo, Mitchell (5)	Kaseya Center; 19,734	35–43
79	April 7	Philadelphia	W 117–105	Duncan Robinson (21)	Kel'el Ware (17)	Davion Mitchell (9)	Kaseya Center; 19,700	36–43
80	April 9	@ Chicago	L 111–119	Tyler Herro (30)	Haywood Highsmith (8)	Davion Mitchell (8)	United Center; 20,509	36–44
81	April 11	@ New Orleans	W 153–104	Bam Adebayo (23)	Bam Adebayo (12)	Kyle Anderson (6)	Smoothie King Center; 17,087	37–44
82	April 13	Washington	L 118–119	Jaime Jaquez Jr. (41)	Jaime Jaquez Jr. (10)	Davion Mitchell (8)	Kaseya Center; 19,968	37–45

2024–25 season schedule

=== Play-in ===
2025 play-in game log
Total: 2–0 (Home: 0–0; Road: 2–0)
Play-in: 2–0 (home: 0–0; road: 2–0)

Game	Date	Team	Score	High points	High rebounds	High assists	Location Attendance	Record
1	April 16	@ Chicago	W 109–90	Tyler Herro (38)	Bam Adebayo (12)	Davion Mitchell (9)	United Center; 21,380	1–0
2	April 18	@ Atlanta	W 123–114 (OT)	Tyler Herro (30)	Bam Adebayo (11)	Andrew Wiggins (8)	State Farm Arena; 17,690	2–0

2024–25 season schedule

=== Playoffs ===
2025 playoff game log
Total: 0–4 (home: 0–2; road: 0–2)
First Round: 0–4 (home: 0–2; road: 0–2)

Game	Date	Team	Score	High points	High rebounds	High assists	Location Attendance	Series
1	April 20	@ Cleveland	L 100–121	Bam Adebayo (24)	Bam Adebayo (9)	Davion Mitchell (9)	Rocket Arena; 19,432	0–1
2	April 23	@ Cleveland	L 112–121	Tyler Herro (33)	Bam Adebayo (14)	Bam Adebayo (9)	Rocket Arena; 19,432	0–2
3	April 26	Cleveland	L 87–124	Bam Adebayo (22)	Bam Adebayo (9)	Davion Mitchell (5)	Kaseya Center; 19,600	0–3
4	April 28	Cleveland	L 83–138	Nikola Jović (24)	Bam Adebayo (12)	Davion Mitchell (5)	Kaseya Center; 19,600	0–4

2025 playoff schedule

=== NBA Cup ===
The groups were revealed during the tournament announcement on July 12, 2024.

==== East Group B ====
Pos	Team	Pld	W	L	PF	PA	PD	Qualification
1	Milwaukee Bucks	4	4	0	462	412	+50	Advance to knockout stage
2	Detroit Pistons	4	3	1	447	440	+7	
3	Miami Heat	4	2	2	459	439	+20	
4	Toronto Raptors	4	1	3	413	430	−17	
5	Indiana Pacers	4	0	4	445	505	−60	

Source: NBA
Rules for classification: Tiebreakers

== Player statistics ==
=== Regular season ===
Player	POS	GP	GS	MP	REB	AST	STL	BLK	PTS	MPG	RPG	APG	SPG	BPG	PPG
Bam Adebayo	C	78	78	2,674	749	337	98	53	1,410	34.3	9.6	4.3	1.3	.7	18.1
Tyler Herro	SG	77	77	2,725	399	424	69	17	1,840	35.4	5.2	5.5	.9	.2	23.9
Haywood Highsmith	SF	74	42	1,818	252	112	68	37	478	24.6	3.4	1.5	.9	.5	6.5
Duncan Robinson	SF	74	37	1,785	167	176	40	6	817	24.1	2.3	2.4	.5	.1	11.0
Jaime Jaquez Jr.	SF	66	17	1,368	290	166	61	14	570	20.7	4.4	2.5	.9	.2	8.6
Terry Rozier	PG	64	23	1,658	238	167	37	14	679	25.9	3.7	2.6	.6	.2	10.6
Kel'el Ware	C	64	36	1,422	473	60	39	71	595	22.2	7.4	.9	.6	1.1	9.3
Pelle Larsson	SG	55	8	782	92	65	32	7	251	14.2	1.7	1.2	.6	.1	4.6
Alec Burks	SG	49	14	863	124	55	28	7	356	17.6	2.5	1.1	.6	.1	7.3
Nikola Jović	PF	46	10	1,156	180	131	38	13	494	25.1	3.9	2.8	.8	.3	10.7
Davion Mitchell^{†}	PG	30	15	947	82	160	41	8	309	31.6	2.7	5.3	1.4	.3	10.3
Kyle Anderson^{†}	SF	25	1	461	96	64	14	13	168	18.4	3.8	2.6	.6	.5	6.7
Jimmy Butler^{†}	PF	25	25	766	131	120	27	10	426	30.6	5.2	4.8	1.1	.4	17.0
Kevin Love	PF	23	9	251	94	22	15	4	122	10.9	4.1	1.0	.7	.2	5.3
Andrew Wiggins^{†}	SF	17	17	546	72	56	20	17	323	32.1	4.2	3.3	1.2	1.0	19.0
Keshad Johnson	SF	16	0	98	28	4	5	4	43	6.1	1.8	.3	.3	.3	2.7
Josh Christopher	SG	14	0	69	9	8	5	3	28	4.9	.6	.6	.4	.2	2.0
Dru Smith	SG	14	1	268	36	23	21	6	87	19.1	2.6	1.6	1.5	.4	6.2
Thomas Bryant^{†}	C	10	0	115	32	4	1	9	41	11.5	3.2	.4	.1	.9	4.1
Josh Richardson	SG	8	0	150	12	12	8	1	32	18.8	1.5	1.5	1.0	.1	4.0
Isaiah Stevens	PG	3	0	6	0	2	0	1	0	2.0	.7	.0	.3	.0	.0

- ^{†} Denotes player spent time with another team in the season. Stats reflect time with the Heat only.

=== Playoffs ===
Player	POS	GP	GS	MP	REB	AST	STL	BLK	PTS	MPG	RPG	APG	SPG	BPG	PPG
Bam Adebayo	C	4	4	153	44	17	4	1	70	38.3	11.0	4.3	1.0	.3	17.5
Tyler Herro	SG	4	4	144	14	11	2	0	71	36.0	3.5	2.8	.5	.0	17.8
Haywood Highsmith	SF	4	0	84	13	4	3	2	29	21.0	3.3	1.0	.8	.5	7.3
Nikola Jović	PF	4	0	75	16	6	3	1	38	18.8	4.0	1.5	.8	.3	9.5
Pelle Larsson	SG	4	0	52	9	4	1	0	20	13.0	2.3	1.0	.3	.0	5.0
Davion Mitchell	PG	4	3	142	9	25	3	1	60	35.5	2.3	6.3	.8	.3	15.0
Duncan Robinson	SF	4	0	59	4	1	0	0	17	14.8	1.0	.3	.0	.0	4.3
Kel'el Ware	C	4	4	73	19	4	1	2	19	18.3	4.8	1.0	.3	.5	4.8
Andrew Wiggins	SF	4	4	122	13	9	1	5	46	30.5	3.3	2.3	.3	1.3	11.5
Jaime Jaquez Jr.	SF	3	0	19	4	1	0	0	4	6.3	1.3	.3	.0	.0	1.3
Kyle Anderson	SF	2	0	14	1	1	0	0	0	7.0	.5	.5	.0	.0	.0
Keshad Johnson	SF	2	0	8	1	0	0	0	2	4.0	.5	.0	.0	.0	1.0
Alec Burks	SG	1	1	15	2	2	0	0	6	15.0	2.0	2.0	.0	.0	6.0

== Transactions ==
=== Trades ===
June 27, 2024	Three-team trade
June 27, 2024	To Miami Heat Draft rights to Pelle Larsson (No. 44) (from Houston); Cash considerations (from Atlanta)	To Atlanta Hawks *Draft rights to Nikola Djurišić (No. 43) (from Miami)
June 27, 2024	To Houston Rockets AJ Griffin (from Atlanta)

=== Free agency ===
==== Re-signed ====
Date	Player	Ref.
July 3	Thomas Bryant	
July 6	Kevin Love	
July 8	Haywood Highsmith	

==== Additions ====
Date	Player	Former team	Ref.
July 1	Keshad Johnson	Arizona Wildcats	
July 1	Zyon Pullin	Florida Gators	
July 1	Dru Smith	Miami Heat	
July 4	Alec Burks	New York Knicks	
July 6	Isaiah Stevens	Colorado State Rams	

==== Subtractions ====
Date	Player	Reason left	New team	Ref.
July 6	Caleb Martin	Free agent	Philadelphia 76ers	
July 7	Delon Wright	Free agent	Milwaukee Bucks	
July 7	Orlando Robinson	Waived	Sacramento Kings	
