= 2025–26 Boston Celtics season =

2025–26 NBA season by team

- Division champions
- Head coach: Joe Mazzulla
- President: Rich Gotham
- General manager: Brad Stevens
- Owners: Bill Chisholm
- Arena: TD Garden

Results
- Record: 56–26 (.683)
- Place: Division: 1st (Atlantic); Conference: 2nd (Eastern)
- Playoff finish: First round (lost to 76ers 3–4)
- Stats at Basketball Reference

Local media
- Television: NBC Sports Boston
- Radio: WBZ-FM

The 2025–26 Boston Celtics season was the franchise's 80th season in the National Basketball Association (NBA). This was the first season under the ownership of Bill Chisholm. For the first time since 2015, the Celtics did not play on Christmas Day amidst the extended absence of Jayson Tatum to rehabilitate his torn Achilles tendon. After missing the first 62 games of the season, Tatum returned on March 6, 2026 against the Dallas Mavericks. However, the Celtics failed to improve over their 61–21 record from the previous season with a loss to the San Antonio Spurs on March 10.

On March 29, 2026, the Celtics clinched their 12th consecutive playoff berth since 2015 following a win over the Charlotte Hornets, extending the longest consecutive streak for playoff appearances in the NBA. On April 10, the Celtics clinched their fifth straight division title with a win over the New Orleans Pelicans. Despite what was referred to as a "gap year" due to the expectations brought about by Tatum's injury, the Celtics finished the regular season with a 56–26 record, placing 2nd in the East. Head coach Joe Mazzulla was named the NBA Coach of the Year.

However, the Celtics were upset by the Philadelphia 76ers in the first round in seven games after squandering a 3–1 lead for the first time in franchise history, marking their first series loss to the rival 76ers since 1982, and also marking the first time they were eliminated in the first round since 2021, and the first time in a full season since 2016.

This was the last full season Jaylen Brown would spend with the Celtics before getting traded to the Philadelphia 76ers the following season.

== Draft ==
| Round | Pick | Player | Position | Nationality | College / Club |
|---|---|---|---|---|---|
| 1 | 28 | Hugo González | Small Forward | Spain | Real Madrid (Spain) |
| 2 | 32 | Noah Penda | Small Forward | France | Le Mans Sarthe (France) |

The Celtics entered the draft holding one late first-round pick and one early second-round pick, the latter of which was acquired from the Detroit Pistons in 2023 and originally belonged to the Washington Wizards. The second-round pick was conveyed to the team as the most favorable pick after Washington finished with a worse record than Detroit and the Golden State Warriors in the previous season. The Celtics had traded their original second-round pick in 2021 to the Orlando Magic, but reacquired it from Orlando via trade on draft night when the pick became Max Shulga in exchange for Noah Penda, whom the Celtics selected using the acquired second-round pick.

== Roster ==
2025–26 Boston Celtics roster
Players

| Pos. | No. | Player | Height | Weight | DOB | From |
|---|---|---|---|---|---|---|
| G/F | 45 | Dalano Banton | 6 ft 8 in (2.03 m) | 203 lb (92 kg) | 1999-11-07 | Nebraska |
| G/F | 7 | Jaylen Brown | 6 ft 6 in (1.98 m) | 223 lb (101 kg) | 1996-10-24 | California |
| C | 52 | Luka Garza | 6 ft 10 in (2.08 m) | 243 lb (110 kg) | 1998-12-27 | Iowa |
| G | 28 | Hugo González | 6 ft 6 in (1.98 m) | 200 lb (91 kg) | 2006-02-04 | Spain |
| G/F | 13 | Ron Harper Jr. | 6 ft 5 in (1.96 m) | 233 lb (106 kg) | 2000-04-12 | Rutgers |
| F | 30 | Sam Hauser | 6 ft 7 in (2.01 m) | 217 lb (98 kg) | 1997-12-08 | Virginia |
| G | 11 | Payton Pritchard | 6 ft 1 in (1.85 m) | 195 lb (88 kg) | 1998-01-28 | Oregon |
| C | 88 | Neemias Queta | 7 ft 0 in (2.13 m) | 248 lb (112 kg) | 1999-07-13 | Utah State |
| G | 55 | Baylor Scheierman | 6 ft 6 in (1.98 m) | 205 lb (93 kg) | 2000-09-26 | Creighton |
| G | 44 | Max Shulga | 6 ft 4 in (1.93 m) | 210 lb (95 kg) | 2002-06-25 | VCU |
| G/F | 0 | Jayson Tatum | 6 ft 8 in (2.03 m) | 210 lb (95 kg) | 1998-03-03 | Duke |
| G | 8 | John Tonje (TW) | 6 ft 4 in (1.93 m) | 218 lb (99 kg) | 2001-04-23 | Wisconsin |
| C | 4 | Nikola Vučević | 6 ft 9 in (2.06 m) | 265 lb (120 kg) | 1990-10-24 | USC |
| G | 27 | Jordan Walsh | 6 ft 6 in (1.98 m) | 205 lb (93 kg) | 2004-03-03 | Arkansas |
| G | 9 | Derrick White | 6 ft 4 in (1.93 m) | 190 lb (86 kg) | 1994-07-02 | Colorado |
| F/C | 77 | Amari Williams | 6 ft 11 in (2.11 m) | 250 lb (113 kg) | 2002-01-28 | Kentucky |

Coaches
Head coach
- Joe Mazzulla
Assistant(s)
- Sam Cassell
- Tony Dobbins
- Amile Jefferson
- Tyler Lashbrook
- Craig Luschenat
- D. J. MacLeay
- Ross McMains
- Matt Reynolds

Legend
- (DP) Unsigned draft pick
- (FA) Free agent
- (S) Suspended
- (GL) On assignment to G League affiliate
- (TW) Two-way affiliate player
- Injured

Roster
Updated: April 11, 2026

== Standings ==
=== Division ===
| Atlantic Division | W | L | PCT | GB | Home | Road | Div | GP |
|---|---|---|---|---|---|---|---|---|
| y – Boston Celtics | 56 | 26 | .683 | – | 30‍–‍11 | 26‍–‍15 | 10‍–‍6 | 82 |
| x – New York Knicks | 53 | 29 | .646 | 3.0 | 30‍–‍10 | 23‍–‍19 | 14‍–‍3 | 82 |
| x – Toronto Raptors | 46 | 36 | .561 | 10.0 | 24‍–‍17 | 22‍–‍19 | 5‍–‍12 | 82 |
| x – Philadelphia 76ers | 45 | 37 | .549 | 11.0 | 23‍–‍18 | 22‍–‍19 | 9‍–‍7 | 82 |
| Brooklyn Nets | 20 | 62 | .244 | 36.0 | 12‍–‍29 | 8‍–‍33 | 3‍–‍13 | 82 |

=== Conference ===
Eastern Conference
| # | Team | W | L | PCT | GB | GP |
|---|---|---|---|---|---|---|
| 1 | c – Detroit Pistons * | 60 | 22 | .732 | – | 82 |
| 2 | y – Boston Celtics * | 56 | 26 | .683 | 4.0 | 82 |
| 3 | x – New York Knicks | 53 | 29 | .646 | 7.0 | 82 |
| 4 | x – Cleveland Cavaliers | 52 | 30 | .634 | 8.0 | 82 |
| 5 | x – Toronto Raptors | 46 | 36 | .561 | 14.0 | 82 |
| 6 | y – Atlanta Hawks * | 46 | 36 | .561 | 14.0 | 82 |
| 7 | x – Philadelphia 76ers | 45 | 37 | .549 | 15.0 | 82 |
| 8 | x – Orlando Magic | 45 | 37 | .549 | 15.0 | 82 |
| 9 | pi – Charlotte Hornets | 44 | 38 | .537 | 16.0 | 82 |
| 10 | pi – Miami Heat | 43 | 39 | .524 | 17.0 | 82 |
| 11 | Milwaukee Bucks | 32 | 50 | .390 | 28.0 | 82 |
| 12 | Chicago Bulls | 31 | 51 | .378 | 29.0 | 82 |
| 13 | Brooklyn Nets | 20 | 62 | .244 | 40.0 | 82 |
| 14 | Indiana Pacers | 19 | 63 | .232 | 41.0 | 82 |
| 15 | Washington Wizards | 17 | 65 | .207 | 43.0 | 82 |

== Game log ==
=== Preseason ===
2025 preseason game log
Total: 3–1 (Home: 2–0; Road: 1–1)
Preseason: 3–1 (home: 2–0; road: 1–1)

| Game | Date | Team | Score | High points | High rebounds | High assists | Location Attendance | Record |
|---|---|---|---|---|---|---|---|---|
| 1 | October 8 | @ Memphis | W 121–103 | Jaylen Brown (21) | Luka Garza (10) | Derrick White (10) | FedExForum; 13,681 | 1–0 |
| 2 | October 10 | @ Toronto | L 105–107 | Boucher, Pritchard (19) | Chris Boucher (9) | Baylor Scheierman (6) | Scotiabank Arena; 16,282 | 1–1 |
| 3 | October 12 | Cleveland | W 138–107 | Anfernee Simons (21) | Derrick White (7) | Jaylen Brown (6) | TD Garden; 19,156 | 2–1 |
| 4 | October 15 | Toronto | W 110–108 | Derrick White (33) | Neemias Queta (12) | Payton Pritchard (10) | TD Garden; 19,156 | 3–1 |

2025–26 preseason schedule

=== Regular season ===
2025–26 game log
Total: 56–26 (Home: 30–11; Road: 26–15)
October: 3–3 (home: 1–1; road: 2–2)

| Game | Date | Team | Score | High points | High rebounds | High assists | Location Attendance | Record |
|---|---|---|---|---|---|---|---|---|
| 1 | October 22 | Philadelphia | L 116–117 | Brown, White (25) | Neemias Queta (8) | Brown, White (4) | TD Garden; 19,156 | 0−1 |
| 2 | October 24 | @ New York | L 95–105 | Jaylen Brown (23) | Neemias Queta (7) | Payton Pritchard (6) | Madison Square Garden; 19,812 | 0–2 |
| 3 | October 26 | @ Detroit | L 113–119 | Jaylen Brown (41) | Payton Pritchard (10) | Brown, Pritchard (4) | Little Caesars Arena; 20,062 | 0–3 |
| 4 | October 27 | @ New Orleans | W 122–90 | Anfernee Simons (25) | Neemias Queta (11) | Payton Pritchard (8) | Smoothie King Center; 16,787 | 1–3 |
| 5 | October 29 | Cleveland | W 125–105 | Jaylen Brown (30) | Josh Minott (14) | Payton Pritchard (10) | TD Garden; 19,156 | 2–3 |
| 6 | October 31 | @ Philadelphia | W 109–108 | Jaylen Brown (32) | Josh Minott (8) | Jaylen Brown (6) | Xfinity Mobile Arena; 19,746 | 3–3 |

November: 8–6 (home: 5–3; road: 3–3)

| Game | Date | Team | Score | High points | High rebounds | High assists | Location Attendance | Record |
|---|---|---|---|---|---|---|---|---|
| 7 | November 1 | Houston | L 101–128 | Baylor Scheierman (17) | Josh Minott (6) | Jaylen Brown (5) | TD Garden; 19,156 | 3–4 |
| 8 | November 3 | Utah | L 103–105 | Jaylen Brown (36) | Neemias Queta (8) | Derrick White (6) | TD Garden; 19,156 | 3–5 |
| 9 | November 5 | Washington | W 136–107 | Jaylen Brown (35) | Neemias Queta (12) | Derrick White (8) | TD Garden; 19,156 | 4–5 |
| 10 | November 7 | @ Orlando | L 110–123 | Jaylen Brown (32) | Jaylen Brown (9) | Derrick White (10) | Kia Center; 19,154 | 4–6 |
| 11 | November 9 | @ Orlando | W 111–107 | Jaylen Brown (27) | Luka Garza (8) | Pritchard, Walsh, White (4) | Kia Center; 18,096 | 5–6 |
| 12 | November 11 | @ Philadelphia | L 100–102 | Jaylen Brown (24) | Neemias Queta (10) | Derrick White (7) | Xfinity Mobile Arena; 19,746 | 5–7 |
| 13 | November 12 | Memphis | W 131–95 | Payton Pritchard (24) | Neemias Queta (8) | Payton Pritchard (9) | TD Garden; 19,156 | 6–7 |
| 14 | November 16 | L.A. Clippers | W 121–118 | Jaylen Brown (33) | Jaylen Brown (12) | Derrick White (9) | TD Garden; 19,156 | 7–7 |
| 15 | November 18 | @ Brooklyn | W 113–99 | Jaylen Brown (29) | Payton Pritchard (10) | Pritchard, Simons (5) | Barclays Center; 18,118 | 8–7 |
| 16 | November 21 | Brooklyn | L 105–113 | Jaylen Brown (26) | Neemias Queta (12) | Brown, Pritchard, Simons (4) | TD Garden; 19,156 | 8–8 |
| 17 | November 23 | Orlando | W 138–129 | Jaylen Brown (35) | Minott, White (7) | Brown, Pritchard (8) | TD Garden; 19,156 | 9–8 |
| 18 | November 26 | Detroit | W 117–114 | Jaylen Brown (33) | Jaylen Brown (10) | Jaylen Brown (5) | TD Garden; 19,156 | 10–8 |
| 19 | November 29 | @ Minnesota | L 115–119 | Jaylen Brown (41) | Neemias Queta (18) | Jaylen Brown (7) | Target Center; 17,344 | 10–9 |
| 20 | November 30 | @ Cleveland | W 117–115 | Payton Pritchard (42) | Jaylen Brown (12) | Jaylen Brown (11) | Rocket Arena; 19,432 | 11–9 |

December: 9–3 (home: 4–1; road: 5–2)

| Game | Date | Team | Score | High points | High rebounds | High assists | Location Attendance | Record |
|---|---|---|---|---|---|---|---|---|
| 21 | December 2 | New York | W 123–117 | Jaylen Brown (42) | Tied (6) | Derrick White (5) | TD Garden; 19,156 | 12–9 |
| 22 | December 4 | @ Washington | W 146–101 | Derrick White (30) | Walsh, White (7) | Derrick White (9) | Capital One Arena; 16,026 | 13–9 |
| 23 | December 5 | L.A. Lakers | W 126–105 | Jaylen Brown (30) | Jaylen Brown (8) | Jaylen Brown (8) | TD Garden; 19,156 | 14–9 |
| 24 | December 7 | @ Toronto | W 121–113 | Jaylen Brown (30) | Neemias Queta (11) | Payton Pritchard (6) | Scotiabank Arena; 18,492 | 15–9 |
| 25 | December 11 | @ Milwaukee | L 101–116 | Jaylen Brown (30) | Neemias Queta (10) | Payton Pritchard (7) | Fiserv Forum; 15,458 | 15–10 |
| 26 | December 15 | Detroit | L 105–112 | Jaylen Brown (34) | Jaylen Brown (8) | Jaylen Brown (7) | TD Garden; 19,156 | 15–11 |
| 27 | December 19 | Miami | W 129–116 | Derrick White (33) | Jaylen Brown (9) | Jaylen Brown (7) | TD Garden; 19,156 | 16–11 |
| 28 | December 20 | @ Toronto | W 112–96 | Payton Pritchard (33) | Garza, González (10) | Payton Pritchard (10) | Scotiabank Arena; 19,533 | 17–11 |
| 29 | December 22 | Indiana | W 103–95 | Jaylen Brown (31) | Hugo González (11) | Payton Pritchard (5) | TD Garden; 19,156 | 18–11 |
| 30 | December 26 | @ Indiana | W 140–122 | Jaylen Brown (30) | Payton Pritchard (9) | Derrick White (6) | Gainbridge Fieldhouse; 17,004 | 19–11 |
| 31 | December 28 | @ Portland | L 108–114 | Jaylen Brown (37) | Neemias Queta (8) | Pritchard, White (5) | Moda Center; 17,949 | 19–12 |
| 32 | December 30 | @ Utah | W 129–119 | Derrick White (27) | Derrick White (7) | Jaylen Brown (10) | Delta Center; 18,186 | 20–12 |

January: 10–6 (home: 5–3; road: 5–3)

| Game | Date | Team | Score | High points | High rebounds | High assists | Location Attendance | Record |
|---|---|---|---|---|---|---|---|---|
| 33 | January 1 | @ Sacramento | W 120–106 | Jaylen Brown (29) | Jaylen Brown (10) | Derrick White (7) | Golden 1 Center; 17,832 | 21–12 |
| 34 | January 3 | @ L.A. Clippers | W 146–115 | Jaylen Brown (50) | Jordan Walsh (13) | Payton Pritchard (8) | Intuit Dome; 17,927 | 22–12 |
| 35 | January 5 | Chicago | W 115–101 | Anfernee Simons (27) | Neemias Queta (13) | Derrick White (7) | TD Garden; 19,156 | 23–12 |
| 36 | January 7 | Denver | L 110–114 | Jaylen Brown (33) | Neemias Queta (20) | Brown, White (4) | TD Garden; 19,156 | 23–13 |
| 37 | January 9 | Toronto | W 125–117 | Payton Pritchard (27) | Jaylen Brown (8) | Payton Pritchard (8) | TD Garden; 19,156 | 24–13 |
| 38 | January 10 | San Antonio | L 95–100 | Derrick White (29) | Neemias Queta (13) | Jaylen Brown (7) | TD Garden; 19,156 | 24–14 |
| 39 | January 12 | @ Indiana | L 96–98 | Payton Pritchard (23) | Jordan Walsh (9) | Payton Pritchard (8) | Gainbridge Fieldhouse; 15,650 | 24–15 |
| 40 | January 15 | @ Miami | W 119–114 | Anfernee Simons (39) | Neemias Queta (9) | Payton Pritchard (8) | Kaseya Center; 19,700 | 25–15 |
| 41 | January 17 | @ Atlanta | W 132–106 | Jaylen Brown (41) | Hugo González (8) | Derrick White (12) | State Farm Arena; 17,489 | 26–15 |
| 42 | January 19 | @ Detroit | L 103–104 | Jaylen Brown (32) | Jaylen Brown (11) | Derrick White (5) | Little Caesars Arena; 19,996 | 26–16 |
| 43 | January 21 | Indiana | W 119–104 | Jaylen Brown (30) | Jaylen Brown (10) | Payton Pritchard (8) | TD Garden; 19,156 | 27–16 |
| 44 | January 23 | @ Brooklyn | W 130–126 | Payton Pritchard (32) | Jaylen Brown (10) | Jaylen Brown (12) | Barclays Center; 17,727 | 28–16 |
| 45 | January 24 | @ Chicago | L 111–114 | Jaylen Brown (33) | Jaylen Brown (8) | Pritchard, White (7) | United Center; 22,093 | 28–17 |
| 46 | January 26 | Portland | W 102–94 | Payton Pritchard (23) | Jaylen Brown (8) | Neemias Queta (6) | TD Garden; 19,156 | 29–17 |
| 47 | January 28 | Atlanta | L 106–117 | Jaylen Brown (21) | Tied (7) | Luka Garza (6) | TD Garden; 19,156 | 29–18 |
| 48 | January 30 | Sacramento | W 112–93 | Payton Pritchard (29) | Neemias Queta (15) | Derrick White (9) | TD Garden; 19,156 | 30–18 |

February: 9–2 (home: 4–1; road: 5–1)

| Game | Date | Team | Score | High points | High rebounds | High assists | Location Attendance | Record |
|---|---|---|---|---|---|---|---|---|
| 49 | February 1 | Milwaukee | W 107–79 | Jaylen Brown (30) | Jaylen Brown (13) | Derrick White (8) | TD Garden; 19,156 | 31–18 |
| 50 | February 3 | @ Dallas | W 110–100 | Jaylen Brown (33) | Jaylen Brown (11) | Derrick White (8) | American Airlines Center; 19,132 | 32–18 |
| 51 | February 4 | @ Houston | W 114–93 | Derrick White (28) | Neemias Queta (19) | Derrick White (8) | Toyota Center; 18,055 | 33–18 |
| 52 | February 6 | Miami | W 98–96 | Jaylen Brown (29) | Nikola Vučević (12) | Derrick White (5) | TD Garden; 19,156 | 34–18 |
| 53 | February 8 | New York | L 89–111 | Jaylen Brown (26) | Baylor Scheierman (13) | Payton Pritchard (7) | TD Garden; 19,156 | 34–19 |
| 54 | February 11 | Chicago | W 124–105 | Payton Pritchard (26) | Nikola Vučević (11) | Derrick White (9) | TD Garden; 19,156 | 35–19 |
All-Star Game
| 55 | February 19 | @ Golden State | W 121–110 | Payton Pritchard (26) | Jaylen Brown (15) | Jaylen Brown (13) | Chase Center; 18,064 | 36–19 |
| 56 | February 22 | @ L.A. Lakers | W 111–89 | Jaylen Brown (32) | Neemias Queta (12) | Pritchard, White (8) | Crypto.com Arena; 18,997 | 37–19 |
| 57 | February 24 | @ Phoenix | W 97–81 | Derrick White (22) | Neemias Queta (13) | Derrick White (8) | Mortgage Matchup Center; 17,071 | 38–19 |
| 58 | February 25 | @ Denver | L 84–103 | Jaylen Brown (23) | Jaylen Brown (11) | Payton Pritchard (4) | Ball Arena; 19,763 | 38–20 |
| 59 | February 27 | Brooklyn | W 148–111 | Brown, Vučević (28) | Nikola Vučević (11) | Jaylen Brown (9) | TD Garden; 19,156 | 39–20 |

March: 11–5 (home: 7–2; road: 4–3)

| Game | Date | Team | Score | High points | High rebounds | High assists | Location Attendance | Record |
|---|---|---|---|---|---|---|---|---|
| 60 | March 1 | Philadelphia | W 114–98 | Brown, Queta (27) | Neemias Queta (17) | Brown, White (8) | TD Garden; 19,156 | 40–20 |
| 61 | March 2 | @ Milwaukee | W 108–81 | Payton Pritchard (25) | Hugo González (16) | Pritchard, White (9) | Fiserv Forum; 15,992 | 41–20 |
| 62 | March 4 | Charlotte | L 89–118 | Derrick White (29) | Jaylen Brown (11) | Jaylen Brown (7) | TD Garden; 19,156 | 41–21 |
| 63 | March 6 | Dallas | W 120–100 | Jaylen Brown (24) | Neemias Queta (15) | Brown, Tatum (7) | TD Garden; 19,156 | 42–21 |
| 64 | March 8 | @ Cleveland | W 109–98 | Jaylen Brown (23) | Neemias Queta (11) | Jaylen Brown (8) | Rocket Arena; 19,432 | 43–21 |
| 65 | March 10 | @ San Antonio | L 116–125 | Derrick White (34) | Sam Hauser (7) | Brown, White (7) | Frost Bank Center; 19,080 | 43–22 |
| 66 | March 12 | @ Oklahoma City | L 102–104 | Jaylen Brown (34) | Neemias Queta (10) | Jaylen Brown (7) | Paycom Center; 18,203 | 43–23 |
| 67 | March 14 | Washington | W 111–100 | Neemias Queta (24) | Jayson Tatum (14) | Jayson Tatum (7) | TD Garden; 19,156 | 44–23 |
| 68 | March 16 | Phoenix | W 120–112 | Jaylen Brown (41) | Brown, Tatum (7) | Tied (6) | TD Garden; 19,156 | 45–23 |
| 69 | March 18 | Golden State | W 120–99 | Jaylen Brown (32) | Jayson Tatum (10) | Payton Pritchard (7) | TD Garden; 19,156 | 46–23 |
| 70 | March 20 | @ Memphis | W 117–112 | Jaylen Brown (30) | Neemias Queta (11) | Jaylen Brown (6) | FedExForum; 17,048 | 47–23 |
| 71 | March 22 | Minnesota | L 92–102 | Jaylen Brown (29) | Jayson Tatum (11) | Jaylen Brown (4) | TD Garden; 19,156 | 47–24 |
| 72 | March 25 | Oklahoma City | W 119–109 | Jaylen Brown (31) | Jayson Tatum (12) | Jaylen Brown (8) | TD Garden; 19,156 | 48–24 |
| 73 | March 27 | Atlanta | W 109–102 | Payton Pritchard (36) | Jayson Tatum (12) | Tied (5) | TD Garden; 19,156 | 49–24 |
| 74 | March 29 | @ Charlotte | W 114–99 | Jayson Tatum (32) | Neemias Queta (8) | Jayson Tatum (8) | Spectrum Center; 19,642 | 50–24 |
| 75 | March 30 | @ Atlanta | L 102–112 | Jaylen Brown (29) | Jaylen Brown (10) | Jaylen Brown (9) | State Farm Arena; 17,092 | 50–25 |

April: 6–1 (home: 4–0; road: 2–1)

| Game | Date | Team | Score | High points | High rebounds | High assists | Location Attendance | Record |
|---|---|---|---|---|---|---|---|---|
| 76 | April 1 | @ Miami | W 147–129 | Jaylen Brown (43) | Jayson Tatum (18) | Jayson Tatum (11) | Kaseya Center; 19,881 | 51–25 |
| 77 | April 3 | @ Milwaukee | W 133–101 | Jaylen Brown (26) | Jayson Tatum (11) | Jayson Tatum (9) | Fiserv Forum; 17,341 | 52–25 |
| 78 | April 5 | Toronto | W 115–101 | Jaylen Brown (26) | Jayson Tatum (13) | Jayson Tatum (7) | TD Garden; 19,156 | 53–25 |
| 79 | April 7 | Charlotte | W 113–102 | Jaylen Brown (35) | Jaylen Brown (9) | Jayson Tatum (4) | TD Garden; 19,156 | 54–25 |
| 80 | April 9 | @ New York | L 106–112 | Jayson Tatum (24) | Jayson Tatum (13) | Jayson Tatum (8) | Madison Square Garden; 19,812 | 54–26 |
| 81 | April 10 | New Orleans | W 144–118 | Sam Hauser (24) | Neemias Queta (10) | Payton Pritchard (10) | TD Garden; 19,156 | 55–26 |
| 82 | April 12 | Orlando | W 113–108 | Baylor Scheierman (30) | Luka Garza (12) | Banton, Scheierman (7) | TD Garden; 19,156 | 56–26 |

2025–26 season schedule

=== Playoffs ===
2026 playoff game log
Total: 3–4 (home: 1–3; road: 2–1)
First Round: 3–4 (home: 1–3; road: 2–1)

| Game | Date | Team | Score | High points | High rebounds | High assists | Location Attendance | Series |
|---|---|---|---|---|---|---|---|---|
| 1 | April 19 | Philadelphia | W 123–91 | Jaylen Brown (26) | Jayson Tatum (11) | Jayson Tatum (7) | TD Garden; 19,156 | 1–0 |
| 2 | April 21 | Philadelphia | L 97–111 | Jaylen Brown (36) | Jayson Tatum (14) | Jayson Tatum (9) | TD Garden; 19,156 | 1–1 |
| 3 | April 24 | @ Philadelphia | W 108–100 | Brown, Tatum (25) | Brown, Queta (7) | Jayson Tatum (7) | Xfinity Mobile Arena; 19,017 | 2–1 |
| 4 | April 26 | @ Philadelphia | W 128–96 | Payton Pritchard (32) | Neemias Queta (8) | Jayson Tatum (11) | Xfinity Mobile Arena; 19,746 | 3–1 |
| 5 | April 28 | Philadelphia | L 97–113 | Jayson Tatum (24) | Jayson Tatum (16) | Payton Pritchard (6) | TD Garden; 19,156 | 3–2 |
| 6 | April 30 | @ Philadelphia | L 93–106 | Jaylen Brown (18) | Tatum, Queta (11) | Payton Pritchard (5) | Xfinity Mobile Arena; 19,746 | 3–3 |
| 7 | May 2 | Philadelphia | L 100–109 | Jaylen Brown (33) | Neemias Queta (12) | Payton Pritchard (7) | TD Garden; 19,156 | 3–4 |

2026 playoff schedule

=== NBA Cup ===
==== East Group B ====
| Pos | Team | Pld | W | L | PF | PA | PD | Qualification |
|---|---|---|---|---|---|---|---|---|
| 1 | Orlando Magic | 4 | 4 | 0 | 484 | 420 | +64 | Advanced to knockout rounds |
| 2 | Boston Celtics | 4 | 2 | 2 | 441 | 458 | −17 | |
| 3 | Detroit Pistons | 4 | 2 | 2 | 462 | 441 | +21 | |
| 4 | Philadelphia 76ers | 4 | 1 | 3 | 431 | 470 | −39 | |
| 5 | Brooklyn Nets | 4 | 1 | 3 | 421 | 450 | −29 | |

Source: NBA

2024–25 game log
Total: 2–2 (Home: 1–1; Road: 1–1)
NBA Cup: 2–2 (home: 1–1; road: 1–1)

| Game | Date | Team | Score | High points | High rebounds | High assists | Location Attendance | Record |
|---|---|---|---|---|---|---|---|---|
| 1 | October 31 | @ Philadelphia | W 109–108 | Jaylen Brown (32) | Josh Minott (8) | Jaylen Brown (6) | Xfinity Mobile Arena; 19,746 | 1–0 |
| 2 | November 7 | @ Orlando | L 110–123 | Jaylen Brown (32) | Jaylen Brown (9) | Derrick White (10) | Kia Center; 19,154 | 1–1 |
| 3 | November 21 | Brooklyn | L 105–113 | Jaylen Brown (26) | Neemias Queta (12) | Brown, Pritchard, Simons (4) | TD Garden; 19,156 | 1–2 |
| 4 | November 26 | Detroit | W 117–114 | Jaylen Brown (33) | Jaylen Brown (10) | Jaylen Brown (5) | TD Garden; 19,156 | 2–2 |

2025–26 season schedule

== Player statistics ==
Legend
| GP | Games played | GS | Games started | MPG | Minutes per game |
| FG% | Field-goal percentage | 3P% | 3-point field-goal percentage | FT% | Free-throw percentage |
| RPG | Rebounds per game | APG | Assists per game | SPG | Steals per game |
| BPG | Blocks per game | PPG | Points per game |

=== Regular season ===
Boston Celtics statistics
| Player | GP | GS | MPG | FG% | 3P% | FT% | RPG | APG | SPG | BPG | PPG |
|---|---|---|---|---|---|---|---|---|---|---|---|
| Dalano Banton^{†} | 4 | 0 | 13.0 | .125 | .000 | 1.000 | 1.0 | 2.3 | .3 | 1.3 | 1.5 |
| Charles Bassey^{†} | 5 | 0 | 3.4 | .857 | | .500 | 1.2 | .0 | .2 | .4 | 2.8 |
| Chris Boucher | 9 | 0 | 10.4 | .320 | .133 | .750 | 2.0 | .3 | .6 | .8 | 2.3 |
| Jaylen Brown | 71 | 71 | 34.4 | .477 | .347 | .795 | 6.9 | 5.1 | 1.0 | .4 | 28.7 |
| Luka Garza | 69 | 6 | 16.2 | .577 | .433 | .769 | 4.1 | 1.0 | .4 | .4 | 8.1 |
| Hugo González | 74 | 3 | 14.6 | .476 | .362 | .500 | 3.3 | .5 | .6 | .3 | 3.9 |
| Ron Harper Jr. | 29 | 3 | 11.0 | .418 | .350 | .750 | 1.7 | .8 | .3 | .3 | 4.2 |
| Sam Hauser | 78 | 49 | 24.8 | .419 | .393 | .850 | 3.8 | 1.5 | .5 | .3 | 9.2 |
| Josh Minott^{†} | 33 | 10 | 15.9 | .507 | .442 | .769 | 3.6 | 1.0 | .7 | .4 | 5.8 |
| Payton Pritchard | 79 | 50 | 32.4 | .464 | .377 | .890 | 3.9 | 5.2 | .7 | .1 | 17.0 |
| Neemias Queta | 76 | 75 | 25.3 | .653 | .125 | .703 | 8.4 | 1.7 | .8 | 1.3 | 10.2 |
| Baylor Scheierman | 77 | 20 | 18.6 | .453 | .399 | .903 | 3.5 | 1.5 | .5 | .1 | 5.5 |
| Max Shulga | 11 | 1 | 3.3 | .250 | .250 | 1.000 | .5 | .2 | .1 | .0 | .6 |
| Anfernee Simons^{†} | 49 | 0 | 24.5 | .440 | .395 | .889 | 2.4 | 2.4 | .6 | .1 | 14.2 |
| Jayson Tatum | 16 | 16 | 32.6 | .411 | .329 | .823 | 10.0 | 5.3 | 1.4 | .2 | 21.8 |
| Xavier Tillman Sr.^{†} | 14 | 1 | 7.9 | .452 | .200 | | 1.8 | .4 | .4 | .1 | 2.2 |
| John Tonje | 6 | 0 | 7.0 | .286 | .300 | 1.000 | 1.0 | .3 | .3 | .0 | 2.5 |
| Nikola Vučević^{†} | 16 | 1 | 21.1 | .439 | .340 | .789 | 6.6 | 2.0 | .4 | .6 | 9.7 |
| Jordan Walsh | 68 | 25 | 17.8 | .509 | .384 | .772 | 4.0 | .8 | .7 | .5 | 5.4 |
| Derrick White | 77 | 77 | 34.1 | .394 | .327 | .902 | 4.4 | 5.4 | 1.1 | 1.3 | 16.5 |
| Amari Williams | 22 | 2 | 6.6 | .500 | | .714 | 1.8 | .5 | .1 | .5 | 1.4 |

=== Playoffs ===
Boston Celtics statistics
| Player | GP | GS | MPG | FG% | 3P% | FT% | RPG | APG | SPG | BPG | PPG |
|---|---|---|---|---|---|---|---|---|---|---|---|
| Dalano Banton | 2 | 0 | 2.0 | 1.000 | | | .0 | .0 | .0 | .0 | 1.0 |
| Jaylen Brown | 7 | 7 | 35.6 | .455 | .405 | .717 | 5.7 | 3.3 | .9 | 1.1 | 25.7 |
| Luka Garza | 7 | 1 | 8.4 | .500 | .308 | .875 | 1.7 | .9 | .0 | .1 | 4.4 |
| Hugo González | 4 | 0 | 4.8 | .000 | .000 | .000 | 1.0 | .5 | .0 | .3 | .0 |
| Ron Harper Jr. | 6 | 1 | 4.2 | .444 | .500 | | .7 | .2 | .5 | .0 | 1.8 |
| Sam Hauser | 7 | 6 | 23.4 | .413 | .421 | | 4.3 | .9 | .1 | .1 | 7.7 |
| Payton Pritchard | 7 | 0 | 33.0 | .424 | .309 | .875 | 3.7 | 5.1 | .4 | .0 | 14.6 |
| Neemias Queta | 7 | 6 | 21.7 | .735 | | .789 | 8.6 | .6 | .1 | .9 | 9.3 |
| Baylor Scheierman | 7 | 1 | 14.1 | .423 | .381 | | 2.9 | .6 | .9 | .1 | 4.3 |
| Max Shulga | 2 | 0 | 2.5 | .500 | .500 | | .0 | .0 | .0 | .0 | 1.5 |
| Jayson Tatum | 6 | 6 | 36.3 | .475 | .365 | .781 | 10.7 | 6.8 | 1.2 | .0 | 23.3 |
| Nikola Vučević | 6 | 0 | 19.0 | .378 | .292 | .500 | 4.3 | 2.3 | .2 | .5 | 6.2 |
| Jordan Walsh | 7 | 0 | 12.7 | .211 | .167 | .333 | 2.6 | 1.0 | .6 | .3 | 1.7 |
| Derrick White | 7 | 7 | 35.9 | .321 | .273 | .846 | 3.3 | 3.1 | .9 | 1.4 | 11.1 |
| Amari Williams | 1 | 0 | 2.0 | .000 | | .500 | 1.0 | .0 | .0 | .0 | 1.0 |

- ^{†} Denotes player spent time with another team in the season. Stats reflect time with the Celtics only.

== Transactions ==
=== Trades ===
| June 26, 2025 | To Boston Celtics Draft rights to (England) Amari Williams (No. 46); Draft rights to (Ukraine) Max Shulga (No. 57); 2026 second-round pick 2027 second-round pick | To Orlando Magic Draft rights to (France) Noah Penda (No. 32) |
| July 7, 2025 | Three-team trade |
| July 7, 2025 | To Atlanta Hawks (Latvia) Kristaps Porziņģis (from Boston); 2026 second-round pick (Note: Memphis has the right to swap the more favorable of the picks originally belonging to Indiana and Miami for Boston's own pick; Boston also owns the most favorable of the picks originally belonging to Minnesota, New Orleans, New York, and Portland. Atlanta will receive the less favorable of the two picks Boston holds after Memphis exercises or declines its swap right.) (from Boston) | To Boston Celtics (United States) Georges Niang (from Atlanta); 2031 Cleveland second-round pick (from Atlanta); Cash considerations (from Brooklyn) |
| July 7, 2025 | To Brooklyn Nets (United States) Terance Mann (from Atlanta); Draft rights to (United States) Drake Powell (No. 22) (from Atlanta) |
| July 7, 2025 | To Boston Celtics (United States) Anfernee Simons | To Portland Trail Blazers (United States) Jrue Holiday |
| August 6, 2025 | To Boston Celtics (United States) RJ Luis Jr. (two-way contract) | To Utah Jazz (United States) Georges Niang; 2027 second-round pick (Note: The more favorable of the picks originally belonging to Boston and Orlando.); 2031 second-round pick (Note: The more favorable of the picks originally belonging to Boston and Cleveland.) |
| February 5, 2026 | To Boston Celtics Cash considerations | To Brooklyn Nets (United States) Josh Minott |
| February 5, 2026 | To Boston Celtics 2030 second-round pick (Note: Boston will receive the pick if it's No. 56–60.) | To Charlotte Hornets (United States) Xavier Tillman; Cash considerations |
| February 5, 2026 | To Boston Celtics (Montenegro) Nikola Vučević; 2027 Denver second-round pick | To Chicago Bulls (United States) Anfernee Simons; 2026 second-round pick (Note: The most favorable of the picks originally belonging to Minnesota, New Orleans, New York, and Portland.) |
| February 5, 2026 | To Boston Celtics (United States) John Tonje (two-way contract) | To Utah Jazz (Canada) Chris Boucher; 2027 Denver second-round pick Cash considerations |

=== Free agency ===
==== Re-signed ====
| Date | Player | Ref. |

==== Additions ====
| Date | Player | Former Team | Ref. |
|---|---|---|---|
| March 15, 2026 | (Nigeria) Charles Bassey | Santa Cruz Warriors (NBA G League) | |
| March 25, 2026 | (Nigeria) Charles Bassey | Boston Celtics | |

==== Subtractions ====
| Date | Player | Reason | New Team | Ref. |
|---|---|---|---|---|
| October 1, 2025 | (Dominican Republic) Al Horford | Free agency | Golden State Warriors | |
