= Max Shulga =

Ukrainian basketball player (born 2002)

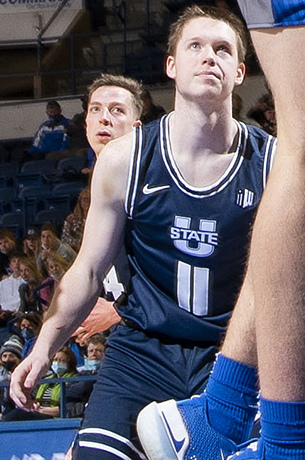
- Shulga in 2021

No. 2 – Real Madrid
- Position: Shooting guard
- League: Liga ACB; EuroLeague

Personal information
- Born: June 25, 2002 (age 24) Kyiv, Ukraine
- Listed height: 1.97 m (6 ft 6 in)
- Listed weight: 95 kg (209 lb)

Career information
- High school: Basketball School of Excellence (Torrelodones, Spain)
- College: Utah State (2020–2023); VCU (2023–2025)
- NBA draft: 2025: 2nd round, 57th overall pick
- Drafted by: Orlando Magic
- Playing career: 2025–present

Career history
- 2025–2026: Boston Celtics
- 2025–2026: →Maine Celtics
- 2026–present: Real Madrid

Career highlights
- EuroLeague SuperCup champion (2026); Atlantic 10 Player of the Year (2025); 2× First-team All-Atlantic 10 (2024, 2025)
- Stats at NBA.com
- Stats at Basketball Reference

Maksym Shulga (Ukrainian: Максим Шульга; born June 25, 2002) is a Ukrainian professional basketball player for Real Madrid of the Liga ACB and the EuroLeague. He played college basketball for the Utah State Aggies and the VCU Rams. In the 2025 NBA draft, he was selected with the 57th overall pick by the Orlando Magic, and traded to the Boston Celtics of the National Basketball Association (NBA), where he only played eleven games.

== Early life and education ==
Shulga was born and grew up in Kyiv, Ukraine. He moved to Spain at age 11 to study and play basketball in Colegio Leones in León. At age 14 he moved to Madrid to attend the Basketball School of Excellence in Torrelodones. Shulga committed to play college basketball in the United States at Utah State.

== College career ==
=== Utah State ===
Shulga began his college career at Utah State. He was named honorable mention All-Mountain West Conference as a junior after averaging 11.9 points, 4.5 rebounds, and four assists per game. After the season and the departure of Aggies' head coach Ryan Odom, he entered the NCAA transfer portal.

=== VCU ===
Shulga transferred to VCU, following Odom. He was named first-team All-Atlantic 10 Conference in his first season with the Rams after averaging 14 points, 4.6 rebounds, and 3.6 assists per game. Shulga re-entered the transfer portal at the end of the season and initially committed to transfer to Villanova, but ultimately decommitted and returned to VCU.

In his final year at VCU, Shulga averaged a career-high 15 points, 5.9 rebounds, and four assists per game. Shulga led the Rams to both the Atlantic 10 Conference regular season and Atlantic 10 tournament championships, winning the 2025 A-10 tournament title and the conference's automatic bid to the NCAA tournament. They won 18 of their final 20 games en route to a No. 11 seed in the NCAA tournament, where they lost to No. 6 seed BYU in the first round.

== Professional career ==
=== Boston Celtics (2025–2026) ===
Shulga was one of 75 players invited to the 2025 NBA draft combine in May 2025. He was selected with the 57th overall pick in the 2025 NBA draft by the Orlando Magic, and his rights were then traded to the Boston Celtics. On August 7, 2025, Boston signed Shulga to a two-way contract. He was assigned to the Celtics' NBA G League team the Maine Celtics to start the season. On February 4, 2026, Shulga logged about two minutes of playing time for the first time in his NBA career, in a 114–93 victory over the Houston Rockets. On March 15, he signed a two-year, standard contract with the Celtics.

=== Real Madrid (2026–present) ===
On July 2, 2026, Shulga joined the Golden State Warriors for the 2026 NBA Summer League. On August 14, Shulga signed a two-year contract with Real Madrid of the Liga ACB and the EuroLeague.

== Career statistics ==
Legend
| GP | Games played | GS | Games started | MPG | Minutes per game |
| FG% | Field goal percentage | 3P% | 3-point field goal percentage | FT% | Free throw percentage |
| RPG | Rebounds per game | APG | Assists per game | SPG | Steals per game |
| BPG | Blocks per game | PPG | Points per game | **Bold** | Career high |

=== NBA ===
==== Regular season ====
| Year | Team | GP | GS | MPG | FG% | 3P% | FT% | RPG | APG | SPG | BPG | PPG |
|---|---|---|---|---|---|---|---|---|---|---|---|---|
| 2025–26 | Boston | 11 | 1 | 3.3 | .250 | .250 | 1.000 | .5 | .2 | .1 | .0 | .6 |
| Career | | 11 | 1 | 3.3 | .250 | .250 | 1.000 | .5 | .2 | .1 | .0 | .6 |

==== Playoffs ====
| Year | Team | GP | GS | MPG | FG% | 3P% | FT% | RPG | APG | SPG | BPG | PPG |
|---|---|---|---|---|---|---|---|---|---|---|---|---|
| 2026 | Boston | 2 | 0 | 2.5 | .500 | .500 | – | .0 | .0 | .0 | .0 | 1.5 |
| Career | | 2 | 0 | 2.5 | .500 | .500 | – | .0 | .0 | .0 | .0 | 1.5 |

=== College ===
| Year | Team | GP | GS | MPG | FG% | 3P% | FT% | RPG | APG | SPG | BPG | PPG |
|---|---|---|---|---|---|---|---|---|---|---|---|---|
| 2020–21 | Utah State | 23 | 0 | 6.8 | .342 | .300 | .833 | 1.8 | .3 | .4 | .0 | 1.6 |
| 2021–22 | Utah State | 32 | 2 | 13.7 | **.512** | **.450** | .776 | 2.1 | 1.0 | .7 | .1 | 4.4 |
| 2022–23 | Utah State | 35 | 35 | 31.1 | .428 | .364 | .824 | 4.5 | **4.0** | .7 | **.3** | 11.9 |
| 2023–24 | VCU | **37** | **37** | **32.8** | .446 | .415 | **.876** | 4.6 | 3.6 | .9 | **.3** | 14.0 |
| 2024–25 | VCU | 35 | 35 | **32.8** | .435 | .387 | .783 | **5.9** | **4.0** | **1.8** | .1 | **15.0** |
| Career | | 162 | 109 | 25.0 | .439 | .392 | .821 | 4.0 | 2.8 | .9 | .2 | 10.1 |
