= Sam Hauser =

American basketball player (born 1997)

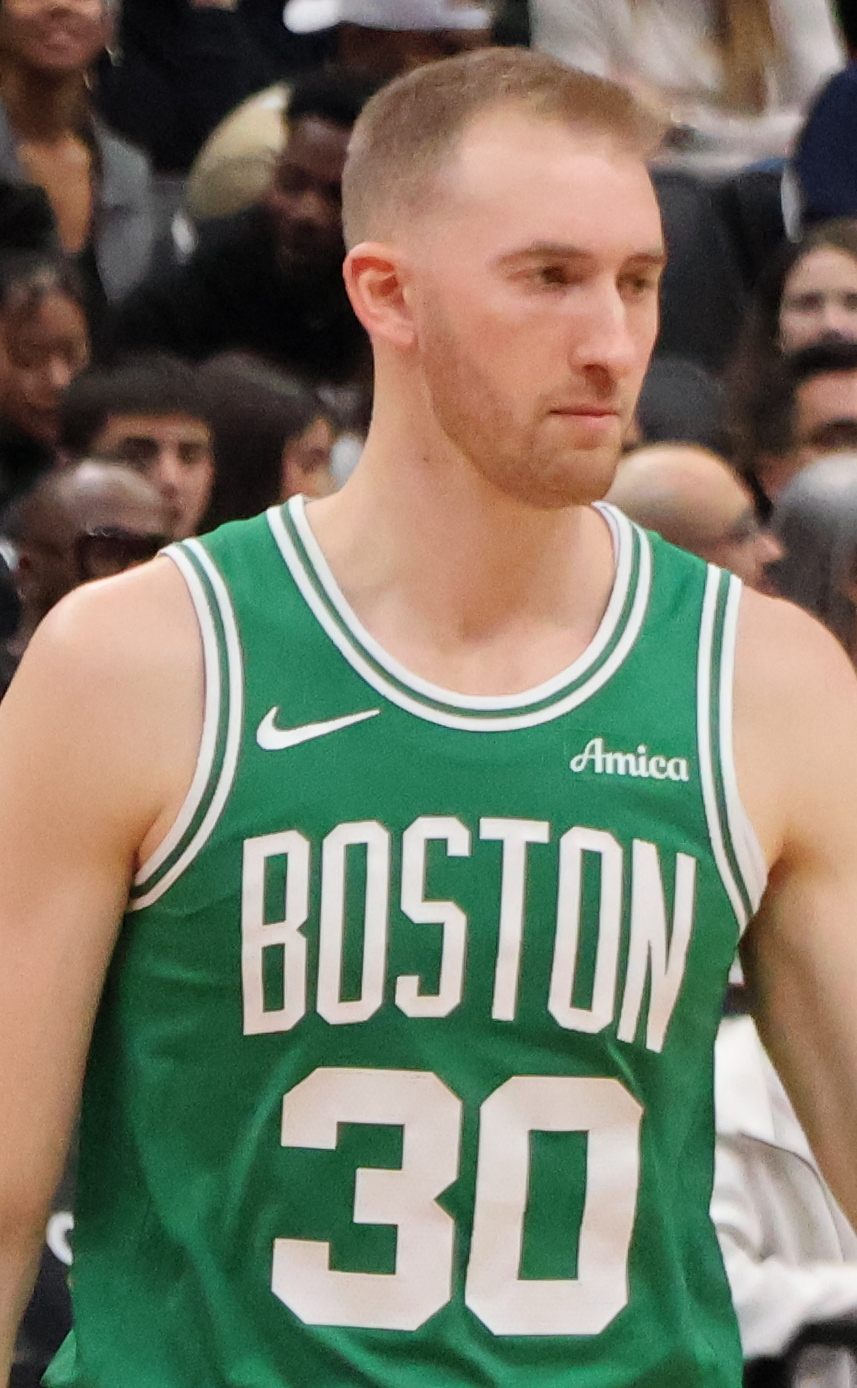
- Hauser with the Boston Celtics in 2024

No. 30 – Boston Celtics
- Position: Small forward
- League: NBA

Personal information
- Born: December 8, 1997 (age 28) Green Bay, Wisconsin, U.S.
- Listed height: 6 ft 7 in (2.01 m)
- Listed weight: 217 lb (98 kg)

Career information
- High school: Stevens Point Area (Stevens Point, Wisconsin)
- College: Marquette (2016–2019); Virginia (2020–2021)
- NBA draft: 2021: undrafted
- Playing career: 2021–present

Career history
- 2021–present: Boston Celtics
- 2021–2022: →Maine Celtics

Career highlights
- NBA champion (2024); First-team All-ACC (2021); Second-team All-Big East (2019); Co-Wisconsin Mr. Basketball (2016); Wisconsin Gatorade Player of the Year (2016)
- Stats at NBA.com
- Stats at Basketball Reference

Samuel David Hauser (/ˈhaʊzər/ HOW-zər; born December 8, 1997) is an American professional basketball player for the Boston Celtics of the National Basketball Association (NBA). He played college basketball for Marquette and, in his senior season, the Virginia Cavaliers, where he posted a stellar 50% FG, 42% 3FG, and 90% FT shooting season but came up just .004 short in free throw percentage from officially qualifying for the 50–40–90 club.

== High school career ==
Hauser played basketball, golf and football for Stevens Point Area Senior High School (SPASH) in Stevens Point, Wisconsin. His father, Dave, was an assistant basketball coach, and his younger brother, Joey, was one of his teammates for his final two years. In his junior season, Hauser averaged 18 points, 7.5 rebounds, and 3.3 assists per game and led the state with a 50.6 three-point percentage. He led his team to a 27–1 record and the Wisconsin Interscholastic Athletic Association Division 1 state championship, scoring 25 points in the title game against Germantown High School.

As a senior, Hauser helped SPASH achieve an undefeated season and win a second consecutive Division 1 state championship. He averaged 18.2 points, 6.7 rebounds, four assists and 3.1 blocks per game and was named Wisconsin Gatorade Player of the Year and shared Wisconsin Mr. Basketball honors with his teammate, Trevor Anderson. Hauser committed to playing college basketball for Marquette on May 17, 2015, over offers from Virginia, Iowa State and Creighton, among several other NCAA Division I programs.

== College career ==
Hauser made his debut for Marquette on November 11, 2016, scoring 14 points in 19 minutes off the bench in a 95–71 win over Vanderbilt. He was named Big East Conference Freshman of the Week. On December 4, Hauser recorded a season-high 19 points in an 89–79 victory over Georgia. He scored 19 points in his subsequent game, two days later, in an 84–81 win over Fresno State. On February 21, 2017, Hauser matched his season high again, contributing 19 points with 5 three-pointers, 8 rebounds and 4 steals in a 93–71 victory over St. John's. He also helped his team set a program record for three-pointers in a single season. As a freshman, Hauser averaged 8.8 points, five rebounds and 1.3 assists per game, shooting 45.3 percent from three-point range while leading his team in minutes and defensive rebounding.

On November 27, 2017, Hauser scored a sophomore season-high 30 points, along with nine rebounds and four assists, in an 86–83 overtime win over Eastern Illinois. On December 21, he hit a career-high 7 three-pointers in a 29-point effort to lead his team past American, 92–51. Hauser matched his career high in scoring on January 12, 2018, with 30 points and 6 rebounds in a 94–83 loss to Butler. As a sophomore, he averaged 14.1 points, 5.7 rebounds, and 2.9 assists per game.

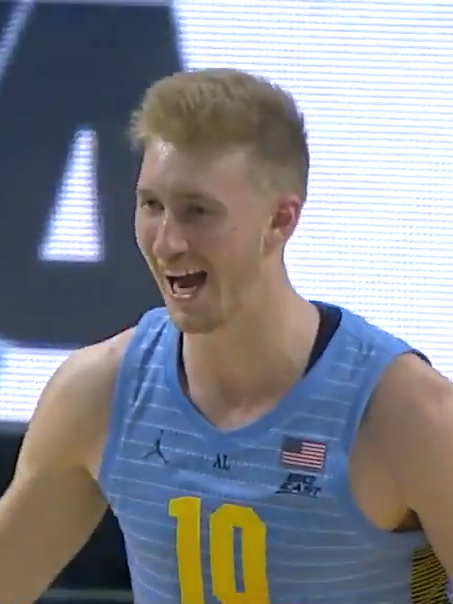
Hauser with Marquette in 2019

For his junior season, Hauser was joined at Marquette by his brother, Joey. On December 8, 2018, he recorded a career-high 14 rebounds, to go along with 13 points and four assists, in a 74–69 victory over Wisconsin. On January 15, 2019, Hauser scored a career-high 31 points to go with eight rebounds in a 74–71 win over Georgetown. In his following game, he recorded 25 points, seven rebounds and four assists in a 79–68 victory over Providence. Hauser was subsequently named Big East Player of the Week. After averaging 14.9 points, a team-high 7.2 rebounds, and 2.4 assists per game, Hauser was named to the All-Big East second team. Following the season, he announced that he would transfer from Marquette to try to find a "better fit."

On May 28, 2019, Hauser committed to continue his career at Virginia and sat out the next season due to National Collegiate Athletic Association (NCAA) transfer rules. In his debut for Virginia on November 25, 2020, he scored 19 points in an 89–54 win against Towson. As a senior, he averaged 16 points, 6.8 rebounds and 1.8 assists per game. On March 25, 2021, Hauser announced that he would declare for the 2021 NBA draft. With Virginia, he posted a 50% FG, 42% 3FG, and 90% FT shooting season but came up just .004 short in free throw percentage from officially joining the 50–40–90 club. As teammate Trey Murphy III qualified in the same season, it would have been the first time two teammates made the 50–40–90 club in the same year at the NCAA (or NBA) level of men's basketball competition.

== Professional career ==
=== Boston Celtics (2021–present) ===
After going undrafted in the 2021 NBA draft, Hauser signed a two-way contract with the Boston Celtics on August 13, 2021, splitting time with their G League affiliate, the Maine Celtics. On November 20, 2021, Hauser made his NBA debut in a 111–105 victory over the Oklahoma City Thunder. On February 11, 2022, his two-way contract was converted into a standard NBA contract. The Celtics reached the 2022 NBA Finals but lost to the Golden State Warriors in six games despite a 2–1 lead.

On July 3, 2022, Hauser re-signed with the Celtics on a three-year, $6 million deal. On February 14, 2023, against the Milwaukee Bucks, he hit a game-tying three-pointer with three seconds left in the game, eventually sending it to overtime, where the Celtics lost 131–125. On April 7, Hauser recorded a then career-high 26 points in a 121–102 victory over the Toronto Raptors.

During the 2023–24 regular season, Hauser contributed five dunks in eighteen games, earning him the nickname "Slam Hauser" after a 126–97 win over the Utah Jazz on January 5, 2024.

On March 17, 2024, Hauser put up a then career high of 30 points on a career-high 10 three-pointers made in a 130–104 victory over the Washington Wizards. Hauser helped the Celtics win the 2024 NBA Finals, where they defeated the Dallas Mavericks in 5 games, contributing a total of 11 three-pointers throughout the series.

On July 21, 2024, Hauser signed a four-year, $45 million contract extension with Boston.

On March 10, 2025, Hauser scored a career-high 33 points, including nine three-pointers, in a 114–108 victory against the Utah Jazz. By making seven threes in the third period, he set a Celtics franchise record for the most three-pointers made in a quarter. Hauser also became only the eighteenth player in NBA history to make seven or more three-pointers in a single quarter.

== Career statistics ==
Legend
GP	Games played	GS	Games started	MPG	Minutes per game
FG%	Field goal percentage	3P%	3-point field goal percentage	FT%	Free throw percentage
RPG	Rebounds per game	APG	Assists per game	SPG	Steals per game
BPG	Blocks per game	PPG	Points per game	**Bold**	Career high
†	Won an NBA championship

=== NBA ===
==== Regular season ====
Year	Team	GP	GS	MPG	FG%	3P%	FT%	RPG	APG	SPG	BPG	PPG
2021–22	Boston	26	0	6.1	**.460**	**.432**	—	1.1	.4	.0	.1	2.5
2022–23	Boston	**80**	8	16.1	.455	.418	.706	2.6	.9	.4	**.3**	6.4
2023–24†	Boston	79	13	22.0	.446	.424	.895	3.5	1.0	.5	**.3**	9.0
2024–25	Boston	71	19	21.7	.451	.416	**1.000**	3.2	.9	**.6**	.2	8.5
2025–26	Boston	78	**49**	**24.8**	.419	.393	.850	**3.8**	**1.5**	.5	**.3**	**9.2**
Career		334	89	20.0	.442	.412	.851	3.1	1.0	.4	.3	7.8

==== Playoffs ====
Year	Team	GP	GS	MPG	FG%	3P%	FT%	RPG	APG	SPG	BPG	PPG
2022	Boston	7	0	2.1	.250	.333	**1.000**	.1	.3	.0	.0	.7
2023	Boston	15	0	6.9	.345	.333	**1.000**	1.1	.3	.1	.1	2.0
2024†	Boston	**19**	0	14.9	**.429**	.380	**1.000**	2.2	.6	**.3**	**.2**	5.4
2025	Boston	8	0	13.5	.417	.333	**1.000**	1.5	.5	.1	.1	3.5
2026	Boston	7	**6**	**23.4**	.413	**.421**	–	**4.3**	**.9**	.1	.1	**7.7**
Career		56	6	12.0	.406	.376	1.000	1.8	.5	.1	.1	3.9

=== College ===
Year	Team	GP	GS	MPG	FG%	3P%	FT%	RPG	APG	SPG	BPG	PPG
2016–17	Marquette	32	28	26.5	.473	.453	.828	5.0	1.3	.8	**.6**	8.8
2017–18	Marquette	**35**	**35**	32.6	.499	**.487**	.836	5.7	**2.9**	**1.0**	.5	14.1
2018–19	Marquette	34	33	33.4	.459	.402	**.924**	**7.2**	2.4	.6	.5	14.9
2019–20	Virginia	Redshirt										
2020–21	Virginia	25	25	**34.2**	**.503**	.417	.896	6.8	1.8	.6	.4	**16.0**
Career		126	121	31.6	.483	.439	.880	6.1	2.1	.8	.5	13.3

== Personal life ==
Hauser's younger brother, Joey, was his basketball teammate in high school and collegiately at Marquette. His sister, Nicole Hauser, played volleyball at Southern Connecticut.

== See also ==
- List of National Basketball Association career 3-point field goal percentage leaders
- List of All-Atlantic Coast Conference men's basketball teams
