= 2024–25 Boston Celtics season =

2024–25 NBA season by team

- Division champions
- Head coach: Joe Mazzulla
- General manager: Brad Stevens
- Owners: Wyc Grousbeck
- Arena: TD Garden

Results
- Record: 61–21 (.744)
- Place: Division: 1st (Atlantic); Conference: 2nd (Eastern)
- Playoff finish: Conference semifinals (lost to Knicks 2–4)
- Stats at Basketball Reference

Local media
- Television: NBC Sports Boston; WNEU/WRDM-CD/WRIW-CD/WDMR-LD (2 games in Spanish)
- Radio: WBZ-FM

The 2024–25 Boston Celtics season was the franchise's 79th season in the National Basketball Association (NBA). The Celtics entered the season as defending champions after winning the 2024 NBA Finals against the Dallas Mavericks in five games during the previous season for their NBA-record 18th championship and attempted to qualify for back-to-back Finals appearances for the first time since 1986 and 1987, as well as win back-to-back championships for the first time since 1968 and 1969. On their first game of the season, the Celtics would tie the NBA record for the most three-pointers made in a game. On March 15, the Celtics clinched their 11th consecutive playoff berth in a row since 2015 with a 115–113 win over the Brooklyn Nets.

In the first round, the Celtics dispatched the Orlando Magic in five games to advance to the conference semifinals. However, despite being considered major favorites for championship contention, the Celtics were upset in the second round by the New York Knicks in six games following a devastating Achilles injury to star player Jayson Tatum, marking the seventh straight year without a repeat champion, and the sixth in which the defending champions had failed to advance beyond the conference semifinals. This was the first time the Celtics were eliminated before the conference finals since 2021.

The Boston Celtics drew an average home attendance of 19,158, the 8th-highest of all NBA teams.

== Draft ==
Round	Pick	Player	Position	Nationality	College
1	30	Baylor Scheierman	SG	United States	Creighton
2	54	Anton Watson	PF	United States	Gonzaga

The Celtics entered the 2024 NBA draft (two days long instead of just one day, like it previously was since the draft was shortened to two rounds back in 1989) with a first-round pick and a second-round pick; the latter was originally owned by the Dallas Mavericks and acquired via the Sacramento Kings. They had traded their original second-round selection alongside Gordon Hayward to the Charlotte Hornets in 2020 and the pick was eventually used by Dallas as the final selection of the draft.

To conclude the first day of the draft, the Boston Celtics used the final first round pick to select shooting guard Baylor Scheierman from Creighton University. Then, near the end of the second day of the draft, the Celtics would select power forward Anton Watson from Gonzaga University with the 54th pick of the draft.

== Roster ==
2024–25 Boston Celtics roster
Players

Pos.	No.	Player	Height	Weight	DOB	From
G/F	7	Jaylen Brown	6 ft 6 in (1.98 m)	223 lb (101 kg)	1996-10-24	California
F	12	Torrey Craig	6 ft 5 in (1.96 m)	221 lb (100 kg)	1990-12-19	USC Upstate
G	20	JD Davison	6 ft 1 in (1.85 m)	195 lb (88 kg)	2002-10-03	Alabama
F	30	Sam Hauser	6 ft 7 in (2.01 m)	217 lb (98 kg)	1997-12-08	Virginia
G	4	Jrue Holiday	6 ft 4 in (1.93 m)	205 lb (93 kg)	1990-06-12	UCLA
F/C	42	Al Horford	6 ft 9 in (2.06 m)	240 lb (109 kg)	1986-06-03	Florida
F/C	40	Luke Kornet	7 ft 1 in (2.16 m)	250 lb (113 kg)	1995-07-15	Vanderbilt
F	44	Miles Norris (TW)	6 ft 7 in (2.01 m)	220 lb (100 kg)	2000-04-15	UC Santa Barbara
F	13	Drew Peterson (TW)	6 ft 9 in (2.06 m)	205 lb (93 kg)	1999-11-09	USC
F/C	8	Kristaps Porziņģis	7 ft 2 in (2.18 m)	240 lb (109 kg)	1995-08-02	Latvia
G	11	Payton Pritchard	6 ft 1 in (1.85 m)	195 lb (88 kg)	1998-01-28	Oregon
C	88	Neemias Queta	7 ft 0 in (2.13 m)	248 lb (112 kg)	1999-07-13	Utah State
G/F	55	Baylor Scheierman	6 ft 6 in (1.98 m)	205 lb (93 kg)	2000-09-26	Creighton
F	0	Jayson Tatum (injured)	6 ft 8 in (2.03 m)	210 lb (95 kg)	1998-03-03	Duke
F	26	Xavier Tillman	6 ft 7 in (2.01 m)	245 lb (111 kg)	1999-01-12	Michigan State
G	27	Jordan Walsh	6 ft 6 in (1.98 m)	205 lb (93 kg)	2004-03-03	Arkansas
G	9	Derrick White	6 ft 4 in (1.93 m)	190 lb (86 kg)	1994-07-02	Colorado

Coaches
Head coach
- Joe Mazzulla
Assistant(s)
- Sam Cassell
- Tony Dobbins
- Amile Jefferson
- Craig Luschenat
- D. J. MacLeay
- Ross McMains
- Matt Reynolds

Legend
- (DP) Unsigned draft pick
- (FA) Free agent
- (S) Suspended
- (GL) On assignment to G League affiliate
- (TW) Two-way affiliate player
- Injured

Roster
Updated: March 4, 2025

== Standings ==
=== Division ===
Atlantic Division	W	L	PCT	GB	Home	Road	Div	GP
y – Boston Celtics	61	21	.744	–	28‍–‍13	33‍–‍8	14‍–‍2	82
x – New York Knicks	51	31	.622	10.0	27‍–‍14	24‍–‍17	12‍–‍4	82
Toronto Raptors	30	52	.366	31.0	18‍–‍23	12‍–‍29	8‍–‍8	82
Brooklyn Nets	26	56	.317	35.0	12‍–‍29	14‍–‍27	3‍–‍13	82
Philadelphia 76ers	24	58	.293	37.0	12‍–‍29	12‍–‍29	3‍–‍13	82

=== Conference ===
Eastern Conference
#	Team	W	L	PCT	GB	GP
1	c – Cleveland Cavaliers *	64	18	.780	–	82
2	y – Boston Celtics *	61	21	.744	3.0	82
3	x – New York Knicks	51	31	.622	13.0	82
4	x – Indiana Pacers	50	32	.610	14.0	82
5	x – Milwaukee Bucks	48	34	.585	16.0	82
6	x – Detroit Pistons	44	38	.537	20.0	82
7	y – Orlando Magic *	41	41	.500	23.0	82
8	pi – Atlanta Hawks	40	42	.488	24.0	82
9	pi – Chicago Bulls	39	43	.476	25.0	82
10	x – Miami Heat	37	45	.451	27.0	82
11	Toronto Raptors	30	52	.366	34.0	82
12	Brooklyn Nets	26	56	.317	38.0	82
13	Philadelphia 76ers	24	58	.293	40.0	82
14	Charlotte Hornets	19	63	.232	45.0	82
15	Washington Wizards	18	64	.220	46.0	82

== Game log ==
=== Preseason ===
2024 preseason game log
Total: 4–1 (home: 3–0; road: 1–1)
Preseason: 4–1 (home: 3–0; road: 1–1)

Game	Date	Team	Score	High points	High rebounds	High assists	Location Attendance	Record
1	October 4	@ Denver	W 107–103	Payton Pritchard (21)	Luke Kornet (11)	Payton Pritchard (6)	(United Arab Emirates) Etihad Arena; 12,002	1–0
2	October 6	Denver	W 130–104	Jaylen Brown (21)	Sam Hauser (8)	Derrick White (6)	(United Arab Emirates) Etihad Arena; 11,527	2–0
3	October 12	Philadelphia	W 139–89	Jaylen Brown (18)	Jayson Tatum (10)	Payton Pritchard (8)	TD Garden; 19,156	3–0
4	October 13	Toronto	W 115–111	Drew Peterson (23)	Neemias Queta (15)	Payton Pritchard (9)	TD Garden; 19,156	4–0
5	October 15	@ Toronto	L 118–119	Jayson Tatum (24)	Xavier Tillman (8)	Jayson Tatum (6)	Scotiabank Arena; 17,507	4–1

2024–25 preseason schedule

=== Regular season ===
2024–25 game log
Total: 61–21 (Home: 28–13; Road: 33–8)
October: 4–1 (home: 2–0; road: 2–1)

Game	Date	Team	Score	High points	High rebounds	High assists	Location Attendance	Record
1	October 22	New York	W 132–109	Jayson Tatum (37)	Brown, Tillman (7)	Jayson Tatum (10)	TD Garden; 19,156	1–0
2	October 24	@ Washington	W 122–102	Jaylen Brown (27)	Jayson Tatum (11)	Jayson Tatum (6)	Capital One Arena; 18,610	2–0
3	October 26	@ Detroit	W 124–118	Jayson Tatum (37)	Jaylen Brown (10)	Jaylen Brown (5)	Little Caesars Arena; 19,311	3–0
4	October 28	Milwaukee	W 119–108	Jaylen Brown (30)	Jayson Tatum (8)	Derrick White (8)	TD Garden; 19,156	4–0
5	October 30	@ Indiana	L 132–135 (OT)	Jayson Tatum (37)	Kornet, Queta (9)	Jaylen Brown (5)	Gainbridge Fieldhouse; 17,274	4–1

November: 12–2 (home: 5–2; road: 7–0)

Game	Date	Team	Score	High points	High rebounds	High assists	Location Attendance	Record
6	November 1	@ Charlotte	W 124–109	Jayson Tatum (32)	Jayson Tatum (11)	Brown, White (5)	Spectrum Center; 18,557	5–1
7	November 2	@ Charlotte	W 113–103	Jayson Tatum (29)	Derrick White (8)	Jrue Holiday (6)	Spectrum Center; 19,253	6–1
8	November 4	@ Atlanta	W 123–93	Jayson Tatum (28)	Kornet, Queta (7)	Jayson Tatum (9)	State Farm Arena; 15,031	7–1
9	November 6	Golden State	L 112–118	Jayson Tatum (32)	Jrue Holiday (9)	Jrue Holiday (8)	TD Garden; 19,156	7–2
10	November 8	Brooklyn	W 108–104 (OT)	Jayson Tatum (33)	Horford, Queta (10)	Tatum, White (6)	TD Garden; 19,156	8–2
11	November 10	@ Milwaukee	W 113–107	Jayson Tatum (31)	Jayson Tatum (12)	Tatum, White (6)	Fiserv Forum; 17,341	9–2
12	November 12	Atlanta	L 116–117	Jaylen Brown (37)	Tatum, White (6)	Jayson Tatum (8)	TD Garden; 19,156	9–3
13	November 13	@ Brooklyn	W 139–114	Jayson Tatum (36)	Jaylen Brown (12)	Jayson Tatum (10)	Barclays Center; 18,112	10–3
14	November 16	Toronto	W 126–123 (OT)	Jaylen Brown (27)	Jayson Tatum (11)	Jayson Tatum (9)	TD Garden; 19,156	11–3
15	November 19	Cleveland	W 120–117	Jayson Tatum (33)	Jayson Tatum (12)	Jaylen Brown (8)	TD Garden; 19,156	12–3
16	November 22	@ Washington	W 108–96	Jaylen Brown (31)	Jaylen Brown (11)	Jayson Tatum (8)	Capital One Arena; 20,385	13–3
17	November 24	Minnesota	W 107–105	Jaylen Brown (29)	Derrick White (9)	Derrick White (5)	TD Garden; 19,156	14–3
18	November 25	L.A. Clippers	W 126–94	Pritchard, Tatum (20)	Queta, Tatum (9)	Derrick White (7)	TD Garden; 19,156	15–3
19	November 29	@ Chicago	W 138–129	Jayson Tatum (35)	Jayson Tatum (14)	Jayson Tatum (5)	United Center; 19,798	16–3

December: 8–6 (home: 6–4; road: 2–2)

Game	Date	Team	Score	High points	High rebounds	High assists	Location Attendance	Record
20	December 1	@ Cleveland	L 111–115	Jayson Tatum (33)	Porziņģis, Tatum (8)	Jrue Holiday (5)	Rocket Mortgage FieldHouse; 19,432	16–4
21	December 2	Miami	W 108–89	Jaylen Brown (29)	Jayson Tatum (11)	Derrick White (8)	TD Garden; 19,156	17–4
22	December 4	Detroit	W 130–120	Jaylen Brown (28)	Kristaps Porziņģis (9)	Derrick White (11)	TD Garden; 19,156	18–4
23	December 6	Milwaukee	W 111–105	Jayson Tatum (34)	Jayson Tatum (10)	Derrick White (7)	TD Garden; 19,156	19–4
24	December 7	Memphis	L 121–127	Jrue Holiday (23)	Jayson Tatum (13)	Jayson Tatum (9)	TD Garden; 19,156	19–5
25	December 12	Detroit	W 123–99	Payton Pritchard (27)	Jaylen Brown (9)	Payton Pritchard (10)	TD Garden; 19,156	20–5
26	December 15	@ Washington	W 112–98	Jayson Tatum (28)	Jayson Tatum (12)	Payton Pritchard (6)	Capital One Arena; 16,227	21–5
27	December 19	Chicago	L 108–117	Jayson Tatum (31)	Jayson Tatum (10)	Brown, Holiday, Tatum, White (4)	TD Garden; 19,156	21–6
28	December 21	@ Chicago	W 123–98	Jayson Tatum (43)	Jayson Tatum (15)	Jayson Tatum (10)	United Center; 19,803	22–6
29	December 23	@ Orlando	L 104–108	Jaylen Brown (35)	Jaylen Brown (9)	Brown, White (4)	Kia Center; 18,846	22–7
30	December 25	Philadelphia	L 114–118	Jayson Tatum (32)	Jayson Tatum (15)	Payton Pritchard (5)	TD Garden; 19,156	22–8
31	December 27	Indiana	W 142–105	Jaylen Brown (44)	Jayson Tatum (13)	Payton Pritchard (10)	TD Garden; 19,156	23–8
32	December 29	Indiana	L 114–123	Jaylen Brown (31)	Kornet, Tatum (9)	Brown, Tatum (6)	TD Garden; 19,156	23–9
33	December 31	Toronto	W 125–71	Jayson Tatum (23)	Jaylen Brown (9)	Holiday, Horford, Pritchard (4)	TD Garden; 19,156	24–9

January: 10–6 (home: 3–3; road: 7–3)

Game	Date	Team	Score	High points	High rebounds	High assists	Location Attendance	Record
34	January 2	@ Minnesota	W 118–115	Jayson Tatum (33)	Jayson Tatum (8)	Jayson Tatum (9)	Target Center; 18,978	25–9
35	January 3	@ Houston	W 109–86	Derrick White (23)	Luke Kornet (10)	Jayson Tatum (5)	Toyota Center; 18,055	26–9
36	January 5	@ Oklahoma City	L 92–105	Jayson Tatum (26)	Jayson Tatum (10)	Jrue Holiday (6)	Paycom Center; 18,203	26–10
37	January 7	@ Denver	W 118–106	Jayson Tatum (29)	Kristaps Porziņģis (11)	Jaylen Brown (8)	Ball Arena; 19,904	27–10
38	January 10	Sacramento	L 97–114	Jaylen Brown (28)	Jayson Tatum (12)	Brown, Tatum (5)	TD Garden; 19,156	27–11
39	January 12	New Orleans	W 120–119	Jayson Tatum (38)	Porziņģis, Tatum (11)	Jaylen Brown (7)	TD Garden; 19,156	28–11
40	January 15	@ Toronto	L 97–110	Payton Pritchard (20)	Jayson Tatum (10)	Jayson Tatum (7)	Scotiabank Arena; 18,566	28–12
41	January 17	Orlando	W 121–94	Jayson Tatum (30)	Tatum, Brown, Holiday (6)	Jaylen Brown (6)	TD Garden; 19,156	29–12
42	January 18	Atlanta	L 115–119 (OT)	Jaylen Brown (24)	Jaylen Brown (11)	Jaylen Brown (8)	TD Garden; 19,156	29–13
43	January 20	@ Golden State	W 125–85	Jayson Tatum (22)	Jayson Tatum (9)	Payton Pritchard (9)	Chase Center; 18,064	30–13
44	January 22	@ L.A. Clippers	W 117–113 (OT)	Jaylen Brown (25)	Jayson Tatum (7)	Jayson Tatum (8)	Intuit Dome; 15,342	31–13
45	January 23	@ L.A. Lakers	L 96–117	Kristaps Porziņģis (22)	Jaylen Brown (8)	Jayson Tatum (5)	Crypto.com Arena; 18,997	31–14
46	January 25	@ Dallas	W 122–107	Jayson Tatum (24)	Luke Kornet (10)	Jaylen Brown (6)	American Airlines Center; 20,421	32–14
47	January 27	Houston	L 112–114	Jaylen Brown (28)	Kristaps Porziņģis (8)	Jayson Tatum (7)	TD Garden; 19,156	32–15
48	January 29	Chicago	W 122–100	Kristaps Porziņģis (34)	Kristaps Porziņģis (11)	Payton Pritchard (7)	TD Garden; 19,156	33–15
49	January 31	@ New Orleans	W 118–116	Jaylen Brown (28)	Brown, Tatum (6)	Jayson Tatum (10)	Smoothie King Center; 16,432	34–15

February: 8–3 (home: 2–2; road: 6–1)

Game	Date	Team	Score	High points	High rebounds	High assists	Location Attendance	Record
50	February 2	@ Philadelphia	W 118–110	Jayson Tatum (35)	Jaylen Brown (10)	Jayson Tatum (11)	Wells Fargo Center; 19,766	35–15
51	February 4	@ Cleveland	W 112–105	Jayson Tatum (22)	Al Horford (10)	Jayson Tatum (7)	Rocket Mortgage FieldHouse; 19,432	36–15
52	February 6	Dallas	L 120–127	Jaylen Brown (25)	Payton Pritchard (6)	Payton Pritchard (6)	TD Garden; 19,156	36–16
53	February 8	@ New York	W 131–104	Jayson Tatum (40)	Luke Kornet (12)	Jaylen Brown (5)	Madison Square Garden; 19,812	37–16
54	February 10	@ Miami	W 103–85	Jayson Tatum (33)	Horford, Pritchard (10)	Payton Pritchard (8)	Kaseya Center; 19,961	38–16
55	February 12	San Antonio	W 116–103	Jayson Tatum (32)	Jayson Tatum (14)	Derrick White (9)	TD Garden; 19,156	39–16
All-Star Break
56	February 20	@ Philadelphia	W 124–104	Payton Pritchard (28)	Jayson Tatum (11)	Jayson Tatum (10)	Wells Fargo Center; 19,752	40–16
57	February 23	New York	W 118–105	Jayson Tatum (25)	Jayson Tatum (10)	Jayson Tatum (9)	TD Garden; 19,156	41–16
58	February 25	@ Toronto	W 111–101	Jaylen Brown (24)	Payton Pritchard (7)	Jayson Tatum (11)	Scotiabank Arena; 18,134	42–16
59	February 26	@ Detroit	L 97–117	Jayson Tatum (27)	Al Horford (10)	Jrue Holiday (6)	Little Caesars Arena; 20,062	42–17
60	February 28	Cleveland	L 116–123	Jayson Tatum (46)	Jayson Tatum (16)	Jayson Tatum (9)	TD Garden; 19,156	42–18

March: 14–1 (home: 6–1; road: 8–0)

Game	Date	Team	Score	High points	High rebounds	High assists	Location Attendance	Record
61	March 2	Denver	W 110–103	Jaylen Brown (22)	Jayson Tatum (11)	Jaylen Brown (8)	TD Garden; 19,156	43–18
62	March 5	Portland	W 128–118	Payton Pritchard (43)	Payton Pritchard (10)	Jaylen Brown (8)	TD Garden; 19,156	44–18
63	March 6	Philadelphia	W 123–105	Jayson Tatum (35)	Neemias Queta (9)	Pritchard, White (6)	TD Garden; 19,156	45–18
64	March 8	L.A. Lakers	W 111–101	Jayson Tatum (40)	Jayson Tatum (12)	Jayson Tatum (8)	TD Garden; 19,156	46–18
65	March 10	Utah	W 114–108	Sam Hauser (33)	Brown, Kornet, Queta (8)	Derrick White (10)	TD Garden; 19,156	47–18
66	March 12	Oklahoma City	L 112–118	Jayson Tatum (33)	Al Horford (10)	Jayson Tatum (8)	TD Garden; 19,156	47–19
67	March 14	@ Miami	W 103–91	Jayson Tatum (28)	Al Horford (9)	Horford, Tatum (5)	Kaseya Center; 19,719	48–19
68	March 15	@ Brooklyn	W 115–113	Kristaps Porziņģis (24)	Kornet, Tatum (8)	Jrue Holiday (12)	Barclays Center; 18,016	49–19
69	March 18	Brooklyn	W 104–96	Kristaps Porziņģis (25)	Kristaps Porziņģis (13)	Jrue Holiday (8)	TD Garden; 19,156	50–19
70	March 21	@ Utah	W 121–99	Kristaps Porziņģis (27)	Kristaps Porziņģis (10)	Porziņģis, Tatum (6)	Delta Center; 18,175	51–19
71	March 23	@ Portland	W 129–116	Jayson Tatum (30)	Jayson Tatum (9)	Jayson Tatum (9)	Moda Center; 18,181	52–19
72	March 24	@ Sacramento	W 113–95	Jayson Tatum (25)	Porziņģis, Kornet (8)	Tatum, White (8)	Golden 1 Center; 15,855	53–19
73	March 26	@ Phoenix	W 132–102	Kristaps Porziņģis (30)	Al Horford (10)	Derrick White (7)	PHX Arena; 17,071	54–19
74	March 29	@ San Antonio	W 121–111	Jayson Tatum (29)	Luke Kornet (16)	Jayson Tatum (8)	Frost Bank Center; 18,674	55–19
75	March 31	@ Memphis	W 117–103	Al Horford (26)	Jayson Tatum (14)	Derrick White (10)	FedExForum; 16,867	56–19

April: 5–2 (home: 4–1; road: 1–1)

Game	Date	Team	Score	High points	High rebounds	High assists	Location Attendance	Record
76	April 2	Miami	L 103–124	Jaylen Brown (24)	Jaylen Brown (9)	Jayson Tatum (7)	TD Garden; 19,156	56–20
77	April 4	Phoenix	W 123–103	Jaylen Brown (31)	Derrick White (9)	Jayson Tatum (8)	TD Garden; 19,156	57–20
78	April 6	Washington	W 124–90	Payton Pritchard (20)	Luke Kornet (14)	Payton Pritchard (7)	TD Garden; 19,156	58–20
79	April 8	@ New York	W 119–117 (OT)	Kristaps Porziņģis (34)	Derrick White (8)	Derrick White (9)	Madison Square Garden; 19,812	59–20
80	April 9	@ Orlando	L 76–96	Pritchard, Scheierman (15)	Craig, Queta (7)	Payton Pritchard (10)	Kia Center; 19,128	59–21
81	April 11	Charlotte	W 130–94	Payton Pritchard (22)	Al Horford (11)	Jayson Tatum (8)	TD Garden; 19,156	60–21
82	April 13	Charlotte	W 93–86	Payton Pritchard (34)	Kornet, Walsh (8)	Payton Pritchard (7)	TD Garden; 19,156	61–21

2024–25 season schedule

=== Playoffs ===
2025 playoff game log
Total: 6–5 (home: 4–2; road: 2–3)
First Round: 4–1 (home: 3–0; road: 1–1)

Game	Date	Team	Score	High points	High rebounds	High assists	Location Attendance	Series
1	April 20	Orlando	W 103–86	Derrick White (30)	Jayson Tatum (14)	Jrue Holiday (5)	TD Garden; 19,156	1–0
2	April 23	Orlando	W 109–100	Jaylen Brown (36)	three players (10)	Jrue Holiday (6)	TD Garden; 19,156	2–0
3	April 25	@ Orlando	L 93–95	Jayson Tatum (36)	Jayson Tatum (9)	Derrick White (5)	Kia Center; 18,967	2–1
4	April 27	@ Orlando	W 107–98	Jayson Tatum (37)	Jayson Tatum (14)	Derrick White (7)	Kia Center; 19,073	3–1
5	April 29	Orlando	W 120–89	Jayson Tatum (35)	Jayson Tatum (8)	Jayson Tatum (10)	TD Garden; 19,156	4–1

Conference Semifinals: 2–4 (home: 1–2; road: 1–2)

Game	Date	Team	Score	High points	High rebounds	High assists	Location Attendance	Series
1	May 5	New York	L 105–108 (OT)	Brown, Tatum (23)	Jayson Tatum (16)	Jayson Tatum (6)	TD Garden; 19,156	0–1
2	May 7	New York	L 90–91	Brown, White (20)	Jayson Tatum (14)	three players (5)	TD Garden; 19,156	0–2
3	May 10	@ New York	W 115–93	Payton Pritchard (23)	Horford, Tatum (9)	Jayson Tatum (7)	Madison Square Garden; 19,812	1–2
4	May 12	@ New York	L 113–121	Jayson Tatum (42)	Jayson Tatum (8)	Horford, Tatum (4)	Madison Square Garden; 19,812	1–3
5	May 14	New York	W 127–102	Derrick White (34)	Luke Kornet (9)	Jaylen Brown (12)	TD Garden; 19,156	2–3
6	May 16	@ New York	L 81–119	Jaylen Brown (20)	Jaylen Brown (6)	Jaylen Brown (6)	Madison Square Garden; 19,812	2–4

2025 playoff schedule

=== NBA Cup ===
The groups were revealed during the tournament announcement on July 12, 2024.

==== East Group C ====
Pos	Team	Pld	W	L	PF	PA	PD	Qualification
1	Atlanta Hawks	4	3	1	485	470	+15	Advance to knockout stage
2	Boston Celtics	4	3	1	482	459	+23	
3	Cleveland Cavaliers	4	2	2	480	450	+30	
4	Chicago Bulls	4	2	2	518	512	+6	
5	Washington Wizards	4	0	4	408	482	−74	

Source: NBA
Rules for classification: Tiebreakers

2024–25 game log
Total: 3–1 (Home: 1–1; Road: 2–0)
NBA Cup: 3–1 (home: 1–1; road: 2–0)

Game	Date	Team	Score	High points	High rebounds	High assists	Location Attendance	Record
1	November 12	Atlanta	L 116–117	Jaylen Brown (37)	Tatum, White (6)	Jayson Tatum (8)	TD Garden; 19,156	0–1
2	November 19	Cleveland	W 120–117	Jayson Tatum (33)	Jayson Tatum (12)	Jaylen Brown (8)	TD Garden; 19,156	1–1
3	November 22	@ Washington	W 108–96	Jaylen Brown (31)	Jaylen Brown (11)	Jayson Tatum (8)	Capital One Arena; 20,385	2–1
4	November 29	@ Chicago	W 138–129	Jayson Tatum (35)	Jayson Tatum (14)	Jayson Tatum (5)	United Center; 19,798	3–1

2024–25 season schedule

== Player statistics ==
Legend
GP	Games played	GS	Games started	MPG	Minutes per game
FG%	Field-goal percentage	3P%	3-point field-goal percentage	FT%	Free-throw percentage
RPG	Rebounds per game	APG	Assists per game	SPG	Steals per game
BPG	Blocks per game	PPG	Points per game

=== Regular season ===
Boston Celtics statistics
Player	GP	GS	MPG	FG%	3P%	FT%	RPG	APG	SPG	BPG	PPG
Jaylen Brown	63	63	34.3	.463	.324	.764	5.8	4.5	1.2	.3	22.2
Torrey Craig^{†}	17	3	11.8	.356	.290	.635	2.8	.7	.4	.6	2.7
JD Davison	16	0	5.8	.353	.222	.714	.8	.8	.3	.1	2.1
Sam Hauser	71	19	21.7	.451	.416	1.000	3.2	.9	.6	.2	8.5
Jrue Holiday	62	62	30.6	.443	.353	.909	4.3	3.9	1.1	.4	11.1
Al Horford	60	42	27.6	.423	.363	.895	6.2	2.1	.6	.9	9.0
Luke Kornet	73	16	18.6	.668	.000	.691	5.3	1.6	.5	1.0	6.0
Miles Norris	3	0	11.6	.222	.286	.500	3.0	.0	.7	.3	2.3
Drew Peterson	25	1	7.4	.415	.394	.778	1.6	.5	.2	.1	2.2
Kristaps Porziņģis	42	42	28.8	.483	.412	.809	6.8	2.1	.7	1.5	19.5
Payton Pritchard	80	3	28.4	.472	.407	.845	3.8	3.5	.9	.2	14.3
Neemias Queta	62	6	13.9	.650	.000	.754	3.8	.7	.3	.7	5.0
Baylor Scheierman	31	2	12.4	.355	.317	.750	2.1	1.1	.5	.1	3.6
Jaden Springer^{†}	26	0	5.4	.353	.316	.714	.9	.4	.5	.0	1.7
Jayson Tatum	72	72	36.4	.452	.343	.814	8.7	6.0	1.1	.5	26.8
Xavier Tillman	33	2	7.0	.245	.156	.750	1.3	.2	.3	.2	1.0
Jordan Walsh	52	1	7.8	.361	.273	.583	1.3	.4	.2	.2	1.6
Derrick White	76	76	33.9	.442	.384	.839	4.5	4.8	.9	1.1	16.4

=== Playoffs ===
Boston Celtics statistics
Player	GP	GS	MPG	FG%	3P%	FT%	RPG	APG	SPG	BPG	PPG
Jaylen Brown	11	11	36.6	.441	.333	.758	7.1	3.9	1.0	.3	22.1
Torrey Craig	5	0	4.2	.500	.667		1.0	.6	.2	.0	1.2
JD Davison	4	0	3.3	.125	.500	.500	.8	.8	.0	.0	1.0
Sam Hauser	8	0	13.5	.417	.333	1.000	1.5	.5	.1	.1	3.5
Jrue Holiday	8	8	33.0	.483	.346	.692	4.1	4.0	.9	.1	9.5
Al Horford	11	9	31.6	.472	.400	.857	6.0	1.8	.6	1.3	8.0
Luke Kornet	11	1	16.4	.724		1.000	3.9	.5	.5	1.2	4.5
Kristaps Porziņģis	11	7	21.0	.316	.154	.689	4.6	.7	.9	.8	7.7
Payton Pritchard	11	0	27.4	.455	.403	.824	2.3	1.5	.5	.0	11.9
Neemias Queta	4	0	3.2	.833			.5	.5	.3	.0	2.5
Baylor Scheierman	4	0	5.6	.300	.400		1.0	.0	.0	.0	2.0
Jayson Tatum	8	8	40.2	.423	.372	.889	11.5	5.4	2.1	.8	28.1
Xavier Tillman	1	0	8.4	.250	.000		3.0	.0	.0	.0	2.0
Jordan Walsh	5	0	3.1	.000	.000		.2	.2	.0	.0	.0
Derrick White	11	11	37.8	.463	.385	.861	5.1	3.5	.6	1.1	18.8

- ^{†} Denotes player spent time with another team in the season. Stats reflect time with the Celtics only.

== Transactions ==
=== Trades ===
February 6, 2025	To Boston Celtics 2031 second-round pick	To Houston Rockets Jaden Springer; 2027 second-round pick 2030 second-round pick

=== Free agency ===
==== Re-signed ====
Date	Player	Ref.
July 2	Luke Kornet	
July 2	Xavier Tillman	
