= Neemias Queta =

Portuguese basketball player (born 1999)

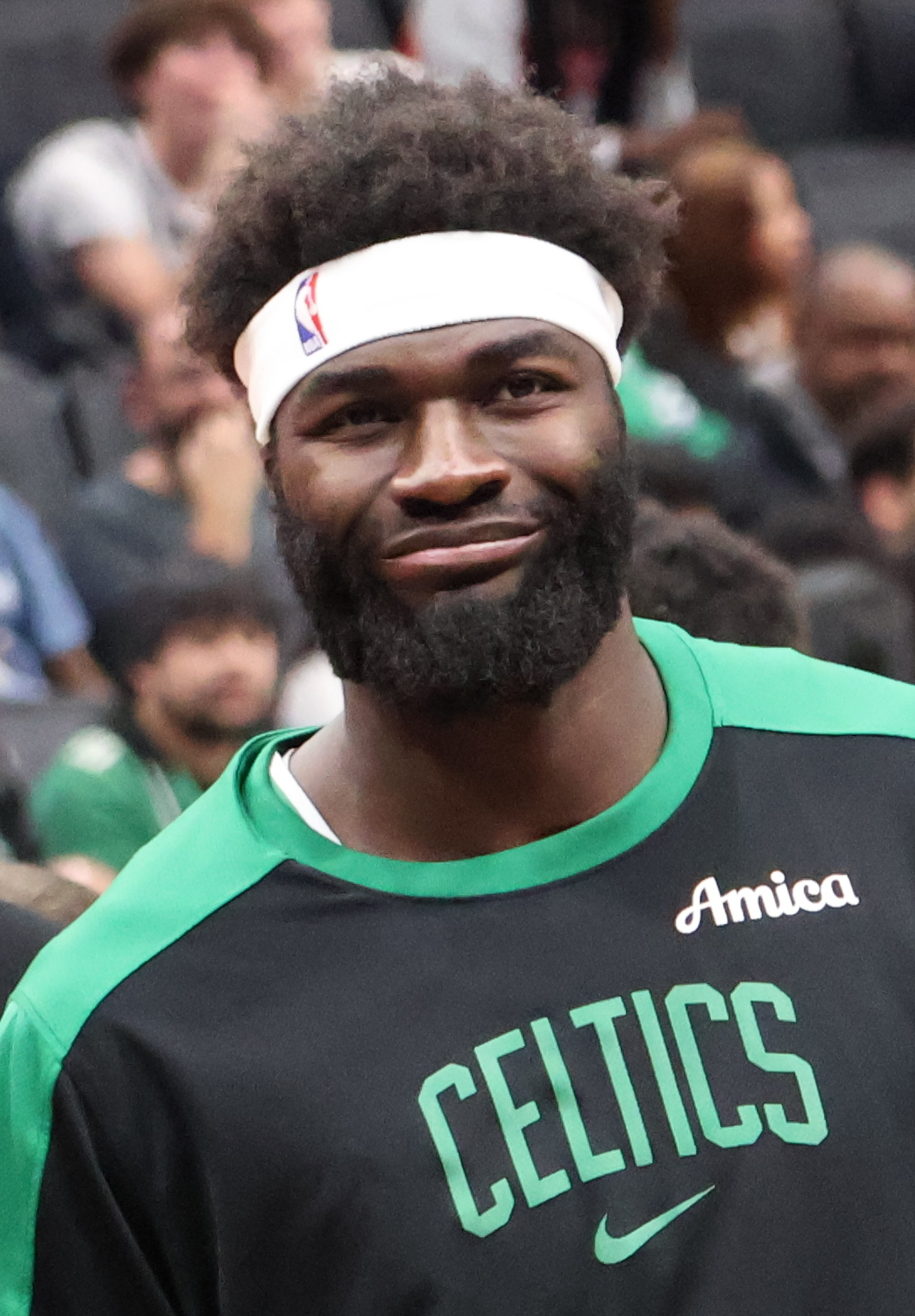
- Queta with the Boston Celtics in 2024

No. 88 – Boston Celtics
- Position: Center
- League: NBA

Personal information
- Born: 13 July 1999 (age 27) Lisbon, Portugal
- Listed height: 7 ft 0 in (2.13 m)
- Listed weight: 270 lb (122 kg)

Career information
- College: Utah State (2018–2021)
- NBA draft: 2021: 2nd round, 39th overall pick
- Drafted by: Sacramento Kings
- Playing career: 2017–2018; 2021–present

Career history
- 2009–2017: Barreirense
- 2017–2018: Benfica
- 2021–2023: Sacramento Kings
- 2021–2023: →Stockton Kings
- 2023–present: Boston Celtics
- 2023–2024: →Maine Celtics

Career highlights
- NBA champion (2024); All-NBA G League First Team (2023); NBA G League All-Defensive Team (2023); NBA G League Next Up Game (2023); First-team All-Mountain West (2021); 2× Second-team All-Mountain West (2019, 2020); 2× Mountain West Defensive Player of the Year (2019, 2021); 3× Mountain West All-Defensive Team (2019–2021); Mountain West Freshman of the Year (2019)
- Stats at NBA.com
- Stats at Basketball Reference
Medals
Men's basketball
Representing Portugal
FIBA U-20 European Championship Division B
Gold medal – first place	2019 Portugal	Team

Neemias Esdras Barbosa Queta (/nɪˈmiəs ˈkeɪtə/; European Portuguese: [nɨˈmiɐʃ ˈketɐ]; born 13 July 1999) is a Portuguese professional basketball player for the Boston Celtics of the National Basketball Association (NBA). He started playing basketball in 2009 for Barreirense and later played college basketball for the Utah State Aggies. A 7-foot-tall (2.1 m), 250-pound (110 kg) center, he was selected with the 39th overall pick in the 2021 NBA draft, being the first Portuguese player ever drafted. He became the first ever player from Portugal to play in the NBA on 17 December 2021. Queta won a championship as part of the 2023–24 Boston Celtics, who gave him the nickname "Neem the Dream".

== Early life and career ==
Queta was born in Lisbon, Portugal, to Bissau-Guinean parents Mica and Djaneuba Queta. His parents fled Guinea-Bissau because of a civil war and moved to Portugal which was a safe haven for displaced Bissau-Guineans. Queta's father worked as a businessman who regularly travelled to Europe for work and his mother worked as a chef. He was raised in Vale da Amoreira, in the municipality of Moita. He began playing youth basketball at age 10 with Barreirense after following his older sister to a tryout. He is the cousin of Wolverhampton Wanderers player Mateus Mané.

On 29 August 2018, Queta signed to play college basketball for the Utah State Aggies in the United States.

== College career ==
On 19 November 2018, Queta recorded 24 points, 9 rebounds and 5 blocks in an 80–63 win over Saint Mary's. As a freshman, he averaged 11.8 points, 8.9 rebounds and 2.4 blocks per game, earning Second-team All-Mountain West, Freshman of the Year and Defensive Player of the Year honors. He set the program single-season record with 84 blocks. He declared for the 2019 NBA draft before withdrawing and returning to college. Queta missed the first nine games of his sophomore season with a knee injury. As a sophomore, he averaged 13 points, 7.8 rebounds and 1.7 blocks per game, repeating on the Second-team All-Mountain West and All-Defensive Team.

On 17 February 2021, Queta posted a career-high 32 points and 10 rebounds in a 79–70 loss to Boise State. On 12 March, he tallied 18 points, 14 rebounds and a school-record nine blocks in a 62–50 win against Colorado State at the Mountain West tournament semifinals. In his junior season, Queta averaged 14.9 points, 10.1 rebounds, 3.3 blocks and 2.7 assists per game. He was named to the First-team All-Mountain West and Defensive Player of the Year. Queta was one of four finalists for the Naismith Defensive Player of the Year Award. He broke his own program blocks record, ranked third nationally in blocks per game, and left as Utah State's all-time leader in blocks. On 29 March, Queta declared for the 2021 NBA draft, forgoing his remaining college eligibility.

== Professional career ==
=== Benfica (2017–2018) ===
In the 2017–18 season, Queta played two professional games for Benfica in the Portuguese Basketball League. On 31 August 2018, he parted ways with Benfica.

=== Sacramento Kings (2021–2023) ===
Queta was selected in the second round of the 2021 NBA draft with the 39th pick by the Sacramento Kings, becoming the first Portuguese player to be drafted in the NBA. On 8 August 2021, he signed a two-way contract with Sacramento, splitting time with their NBA G League affiliate, the Stockton Kings. On 17 August 2021, the Sacramento Kings won the NBA Summer League, beating the Boston Celtics, 100–67. Queta was a regular presence in all the games of the Californian team, which had not won the Las Vegas tournament since 2014, the year in which they defeated the Houston Rockets. On 17 December 2021, Queta made his NBA debut against the Memphis Grizzlies, grabbing five rebounds and adding an assist and a block. He entered COVID-19 protocols on 21 December, but was cleared to return to the Kings on 30 December.

Queta made his return to the G League on 5 January 2022, recording 21 points and 12 rebounds for Stockton in a 103–80 win over the Birmingham Squadron. On 11 January 2022, Queta became the first Portuguese player to score points in the NBA, recording 11 points and 5 rebounds in a 109–108 loss to the Cleveland Cavaliers.

Queta was named to the G League's inaugural Next Up Game for the 2022–23 season.

Despite the fact that he was not a regular starter for the Sacramento Kings, Neemias Queta was the Californian team's most voted player for the 2022 NBA All-Star Game. He received 88,534 votes from the public and also had one vote from an NBA player.

On 8 August 2023, Queta signed a standard contract with Sacramento, but was waived on 12 September.

=== Boston Celtics (2023–present) ===
==== 2023–24 season: First NBA championship ====
On 19 September 2023, Queta signed a two-way contract with the Boston Celtics.

On 26 November 2023, Queta contributed with seven points and a personal record of 10 rebounds in the NBA to the Boston Celtics' home victory over the Atlanta Hawks (113–103). In the end, he was awarded a Tommy Award, an award that recognizes players who excel in their team's defense and who have an impact that cannot be translated into statistical data. On 19 December, in the Boston Celtics' 132–126 loss to the Golden State Warriors, Queta recorded his first double-double by notching 10 points and 10 rebounds in 21 minutes on the floor. He repeated the feat four days later against the Los Angeles Clippers, scoring 14 points with 10 rebounds.

With a positive highlight this season in the colors of the Celtics, Queta came in 49th place in the Eastern vote for power forwards and centers for the 2024 All-Star game, having collected 15,967 votes from fans, two from NBA players and none from journalists. On 8 April 2024, Queta signed a standard contract with the Boston Celtics. The commitment came after the positive performances of the Portuguese center in the campaign of the Maine Celtics, in the G League, during the playoffs, which culminated in a performance of 16 points and 19 rebounds in the triumph against the Long Island Nets in the final of the Eastern conference of that league and consequent qualification of the team for the final.

In the last game of the regular season on 14 April 2024, a 132–122 victory over the Washington Wizards, Queta scored 19 points and tallied nine rebounds, six blocks and one assist in just 19 minutes of playing time. On 7 May, Queta made his debut in the NBA playoffs with 2 points and 2 rebounds in just under 3 minutes of play, in the victory against the Cleveland Cavaliers (120–95). On 14 June, in his first NBA Finals game, he ended with 2 points and 1 block in almost 5 minutes of play during a loss against the Dallas Mavericks (84–122). Queta became an NBA champion on 17 June, after the Celtics defeated the Mavericks in five games.

==== 2024–25 season: Contract extension ====
On 6 July 2024, Queta signed a three-year, $7.2 million contract with the Celtics. On 4 November, Queta made his first career start, tallying 10 points and 7 rebounds in a 123–93 victory over the Atlanta Hawks. He also became the first Portuguese player to start an NBA game.

==== 2025–26 season: Transition to starter ====
The Celtics underwent considerable roster upheaval during the 2025 offseason, including major changes in the front court with the departures of Kristaps Porziņģis, Al Horford and Luke Kornet. Prior to the start of the 2025–26 NBA season, Queta was named the team's starting center. On November 29, 2025, he scored 19 points and recorded a career high 18 rebounds, including 8 offensive boards, in a 119–115 loss to the Minnesota Timberwolves. Factoring in his 2 blocks, Queta became the first Celtic to reach those statistical marks in a game since Robert Parish in 1989.

On 1 March 2026, Queta recorded a career-high 27 points to go along with 17 rebounds, 10 of which were offensive, and 3 blocks in a 114–98 victory over the Philadelphia 76ers. Queta made 76 appearances (including 75 starts) for Boston during the 2025–26 NBA season, recording averages of 10.2 points, 8.4 rebounds, 1.7 assists and 1.3 blocks (all of which were career highs). Following the season, Queta finished fourth in Most Improved Player voting.

On 3 July 2026, Queta signed a four-year, $56 million contract, keeping him in Boston through the 2030–31 season.

== National team career ==
Queta represented Portugal at the 2017 FIBA U18 European Championship Division B in Estonia, where he averaged 10.2 points, 8.6 rebounds and 1.2 blocks per game. He competed at the 2018 FIBA U20 European Championship Division B in Bulgaria, averaging 14.1 points, 10.3 rebounds and 2.9 blocks per game. At the 2019 FIBA U20 European Championship Division B in Portugal, Queta led the host nation to a gold medal. He averaged 14.3 points, 11 rebounds and two blocks per game, earning all-tournament team honors. In the semifinals, he suffered a left knee injury that sidelined him from the final.

Queta was chosen as the 2022 Personality of the Year for the Portuguese Basketball Federation, and for this reason his name was nominated by the FPB for the 26th Sports Gala, of the Portuguese Sports Confederation.

Queta led Portugal at EuroBasket 2025. On 27 August, Queta had a double-double of 23 points, 18 rebounds, four blocks, two steals and an efficiency rating of 39, leading Portugal to a 62–50 win over the Czech Republic. He was the first player to register at least 20 points and 15 rebounds in their EuroBasket debut since FIBA began tracking rebounding numbers. It was also Portugal's first EuroBasket win in 18 years. He led his team to the round of 16, where they were eliminated by Germany.

== Career statistics ==
Legend
GP	Games played	GS	Games started	MPG	Minutes per game
FG%	Field goal percentage	3P%	3-point field goal percentage	FT%	Free throw percentage
RPG	Rebounds per game	APG	Assists per game	SPG	Steals per game
BPG	Blocks per game	PPG	Points per game	**Bold**	Career high
†	Won an NBA championship	*	Led the league

=== NBA ===
==== Regular season ====
Year	Team	GP	GS	MPG	FG%	3P%	FT%	RPG	APG	SPG	BPG	PPG
2021–22	Sacramento	15	0	8.0	.447	—	.647	2.1	.4	.1	.5	3.0
2022–23	Sacramento	5	0	5.7	**.667**	—	.000	2.2	.2	.0	.4	2.4
2023–24†	Boston	28	0	11.9	.644	—	.714	4.4	.7	.5	.8	5.5
2024–25	Boston	62	6	13.9	.650	.000	**.754**	3.8	.7	.3	.7	5.0
2025–26	Boston	**76**	**75**	**25.3**	.653	**.125**	.703	**8.4**	**1.7**	**.8**	**1.3**	**10.2**
Career		186	81	17.6	.642	.091	.707	5.6	1.1	.5	.9	7.0

==== Playoffs ====
Year	Team	GP	GS	MPG	FG%	3P%	FT%	RPG	APG	SPG	BPG	PPG
2024†	Boston	3	0	4.5	.667	—	—	1.0	.0	.0	.3	1.3
2025	Boston	4	0	3.3	**.833**	—	—	.5	.5	**.3**	.0	2.5
2026	Boston	**7**	**6**	**21.7**	.735*	—	**.789**	**8.6**	**.6**	.1	**.9**	**9.3**
Career		14	6	12.7	.744	—	.789	4.6	.4	.1	.5	5.6

=== College ===
Year	Team	GP	GS	MPG	FG%	3P%	FT%	RPG	APG	SPG	BPG	PPG
2018–19	Utah State	**35**	**35**	27.1	.614	.400	.565	8.9	1.6	.7	2.4	11.8
2019–20	Utah State	22	20	26.7	**.624**	**1.000**	.670	7.8	1.9	.4	1.7	13.0
2020–21	Utah State	29	29	**30.0**	.559	.000	**.707**	**10.1**	**2.7**	**1.1**	**3.3**	**14.9**
Career		86	84	28.0	.594	.375	.646	9.0	2.0	.7	2.5	13.2
