= Jordan Walsh =

American basketball player (born 2004)

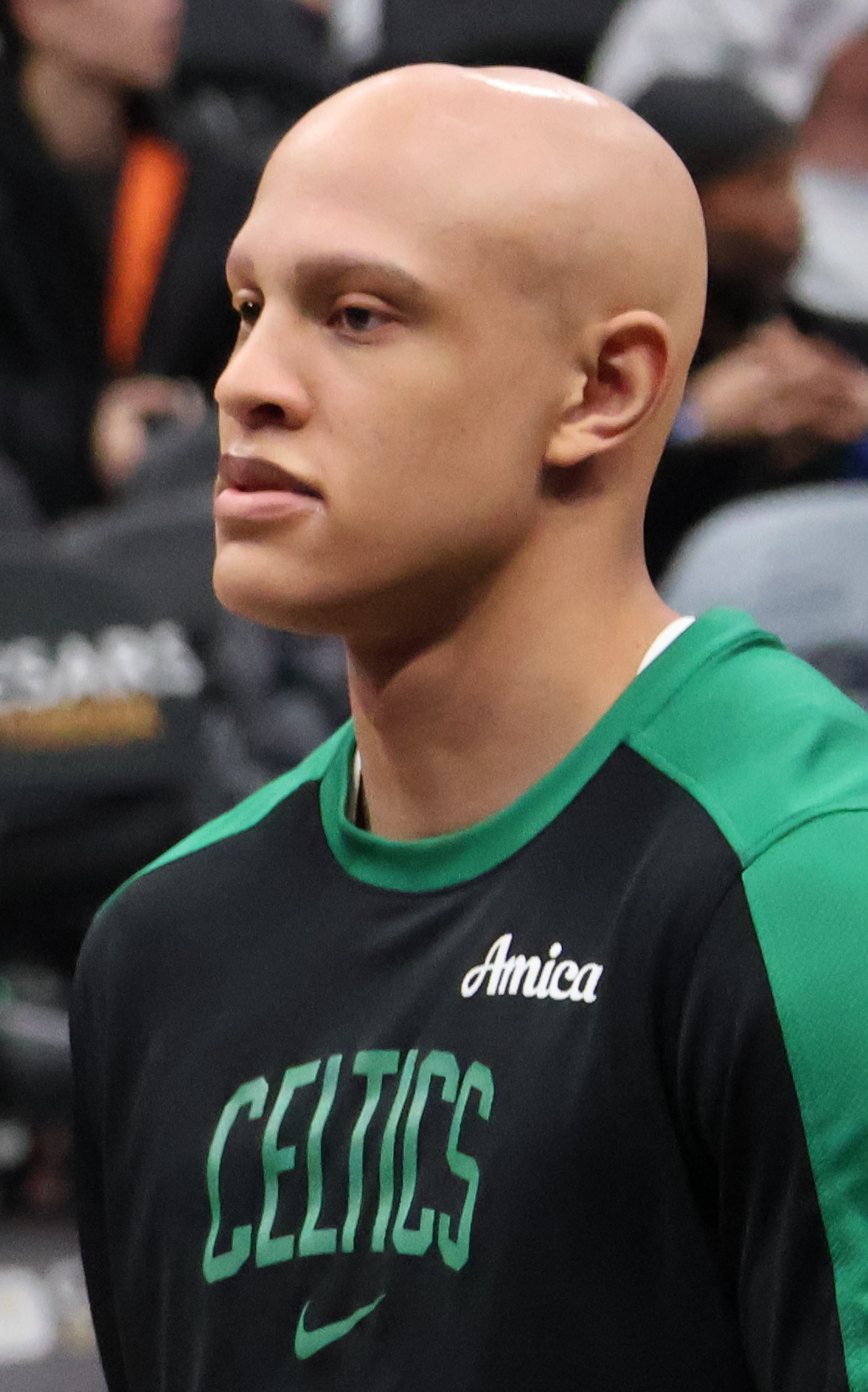
- Walsh with the Boston Celtics in 2024

No. 27 – Boston Celtics
- Position: Shooting guard
- League: NBA

Personal information
- Born: March 3, 2004 (age 22) DeSoto, Texas, U.S.
- Listed height: 6 ft 6 in (1.98 m)
- Listed weight: 210 lb (95 kg)

Career information
- High school: Faith Family Academy (Dallas, Texas); Link Academy (Branson, Missouri)
- College: Arkansas (2022–2023)
- NBA draft: 2023: 2nd round, 38th overall pick
- Drafted by: Sacramento Kings
- Playing career: 2023–present

Career history
- 2023–present: Boston Celtics
- 2023–2025: → Maine Celtics

Career highlights
- NBA champion (2024); McDonald's All-American (2022); Jordan Brand Classic (2022)
- Stats at NBA.com
- Stats at Basketball Reference

Jordan Walsh (born March 3, 2004) is an American professional basketball player for the Boston Celtics of the National Basketball Association (NBA). A guard–forward, he played one season of college basketball for the Arkansas Razorbacks after being a consensus five-star recruit and a McDonald's All-American. The Sacramento Kings selected him with the 38th overall pick in the 2023 NBA draft and traded his draft rights to Boston. Walsh was a member of the Celtics' 2024 NBA championship team.

== Early life and high school career ==
Walsh was born and raised in DeSoto, Texas. He attended Faith Family Academy in Dallas for his first three years of high school. As a freshman, he made the game-winning dunk in the 2019 Class 4A state championship game to give Faith Family its first state title. As a junior, Walsh averaged 18 points, 11 rebounds, five assists, 2.4 steals and 2.3 blocks per game and was named Class 4A All-State by the Texas Association of Basketball Coaches.

Walsh transferred to Link Academy in Branson, Missouri, before his senior year. He averaged 15.3 points, 7.2 rebounds and 3.1 assists per game and was named the 2022 MaxPreps Missouri Player of the Year. Link Academy finished as the runner-up at the 2022 GEICO Nationals. Walsh was selected for the 2022 McDonald's All-American Boys Game and the 2022 Jordan Brand Classic.

=== Recruiting ===
Walsh was a consensus five-star recruit and a consensus top-25 player in the 2022 class. ESPN analyst Paul Biancardi rated him as the best two-way player in the class. Walsh committed to Arkansas over offers from Texas, Memphis, Arizona State and Kansas.

College recruiting
| Name | Hometown | School | Height | Weight | Commit date |
|---|---|---|---|---|---|
| Jordan Walsh; SF | DeSoto, Texas | Link Academy (MO) | 6 ft 7 in (2.01 m) | 195 lb (88 kg) | Oct 14, 2021 |
| Jordan Walsh; SF | Recruit ratings: Rivals: 247Sports: ESPN: (92) | | | | |
Overall recruit ranking: Rivals: 25 247Sports: 20 ESPN: 11
Note: In many cases, Scout, Rivals, 247Sports, On3, and ESPN may conflict in their listings of height and weight.; In these cases, the average was taken. ESPN grades are on a 100-point scale.; Sources: "Arkansas 2022 Basketball Commitments". Rivals.; "2022 Arkansas Razorbacks Recruiting Class". ESPN.; "2022 Team Ranking". Rivals.

== College career ==
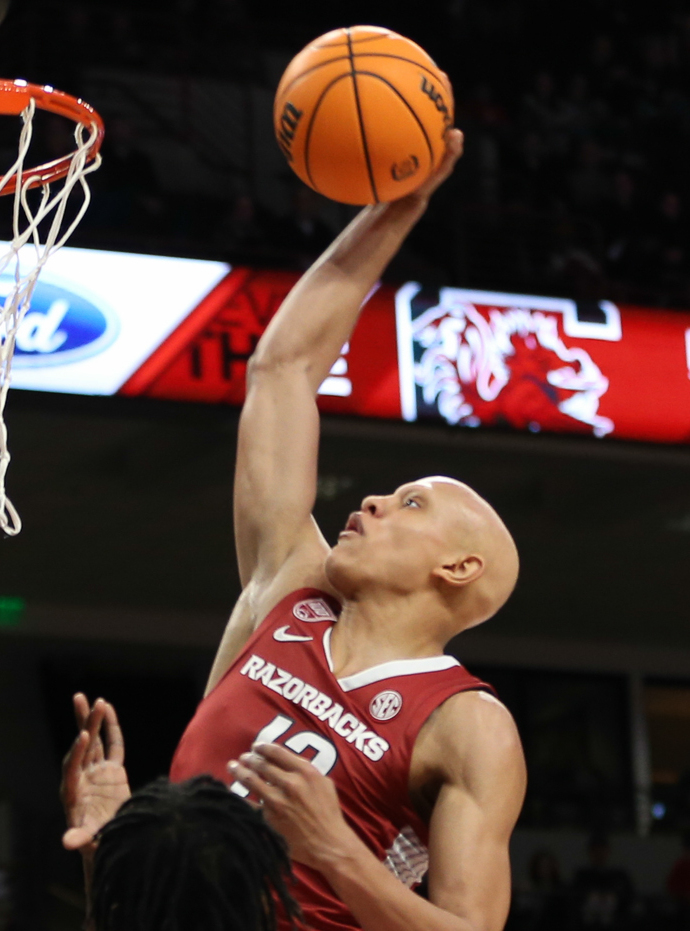
Walsh in 2023

Walsh began his freshman season at Arkansas in the starting lineup but moved to a reserve role during conference play. He appeared in all 36 games, made 22 starts and averaged 7.1 points, 3.9 rebounds and 1.1 steals per game as Arkansas reached the NCAA tournament Sweet 16. On April 19, 2023, Walsh declared for the 2023 NBA draft while maintaining his college eligibility. He announced on May 31 that he would remain in the draft and forgo his remaining college eligibility.

== Professional career ==
The Sacramento Kings selected Walsh with the 38th overall pick in the second round of the 2023 NBA draft. The Celtics acquired his draft rights and the Dallas Mavericks' 2024 second-round pick in exchange for the draft rights to Colby Jones, who had been selected 34th overall. Boston announced Walsh's signing on July 6, 2023. The contract was reported as a four-year, $7.6 million deal with a team option for the fourth season.

Walsh made his NBA debut on January 17, 2024, recording four rebounds in the final three minutes of a 117–98 win over the San Antonio Spurs. He scored his first NBA points on February 4 in a 131–91 win over the Memphis Grizzlies. During his rookie season, Walsh also played 27 regular-season games, all starts, for the Maine Celtics of the NBA G League, averaging 14.7 points and 7.5 rebounds per game. He appeared in five G League playoff games as Maine reached the NBA G League Finals. Walsh was a member of Boston's 2024 NBA championship team, appearing in three games during the Celtics' playoff run. He played three more games for Maine in 2024–25, including two postseason games.

Walsh's role increased during the 2025–26 season, when he appeared in 68 games and made 25 starts while averaging 5.4 points and 4.0 rebounds per game. On December 4, 2025, he scored a career-high 22 points on 8-of-8 shooting, along with seven rebounds, three assists, two steals and one block, in a 146–101 win over the Washington Wizards.

On June 29, 2026, Boston exercised its non-guaranteed $2.4 million team option on Walsh's contract for the 2026–27 season. On July 23, Walsh and the Celtics agreed to a three–year, $15 million contract extension.

== Career statistics ==
Legend
| GP | Games played | GS | Games started | MPG | Minutes per game |
| FG% | Field goal percentage | 3P% | 3-point field goal percentage | FT% | Free throw percentage |
| RPG | Rebounds per game | APG | Assists per game | SPG | Steals per game |
| BPG | Blocks per game | PPG | Points per game | **Bold** | Career high |
| † | Won an NBA championship |

=== NBA ===
==== Regular season ====
| Year | Team | GP | GS | MPG | FG% | 3P% | FT% | RPG | APG | SPG | BPG | PPG |
|---|---|---|---|---|---|---|---|---|---|---|---|---|
| 2023–24† | Boston | 9 | 1 | 9.2 | .400 | .222 | .500 | 2.2 | .6 | .6 | .1 | 1.7 |
| 2024–25 | Boston | 52 | 1 | 7.8 | .361 | .273 | .583 | 1.3 | .4 | .2 | .2 | 1.6 |
| 2025–26 | Boston | **68** | **25** | **17.8** | **.509** | **.384** | **.772** | **4.0** | **.8** | **.7** | **.5** | **5.4** |
| Career | | 129 | 27 | 13.2 | .471 | .344 | .732 | 2.8 | .6 | .5 | .3 | 3.6 |

==== Playoffs ====
| Year | Team | GP | GS | MPG | FG% | 3P% | FT% | RPG | APG | SPG | BPG | PPG |
|---|---|---|---|---|---|---|---|---|---|---|---|---|
| 2024† | Boston | 3 | 0 | 3.8 | **.333** | .000 | — | .7 | .0 | .0 | .0 | .7 |
| 2025 | Boston | 5 | 0 | 3.0 | .000 | .000 | — | .2 | .2 | .0 | .0 | .0 |
| 2026 | Boston | **7** | 0 | **12.7** | .211 | **.167** | **.333** | **2.6** | **1.0** | **.6** | **.3** | **1.7** |
| Career | | 15 | 0 | 7.7 | .217 | .143 | .333 | 1.4 | .5 | .3 | .1 | .9 |

=== College ===
| Year | Team | GP | GS | MPG | FG% | 3P% | FT% | RPG | APG | SPG | BPG | PPG |
|---|---|---|---|---|---|---|---|---|---|---|---|---|
| 2022–23 | Arkansas | 36 | 22 | 24.4 | .433 | .278 | .712 | 3.9 | .9 | 1.1 | .5 | 7.1 |

== Personal life ==
Walsh was diagnosed with alopecia, an autoimmune condition, as a child; it resulted in the complete loss of hair on his scalp and body.
