= Baylor Scheierman =

American basketball player (born 2000)

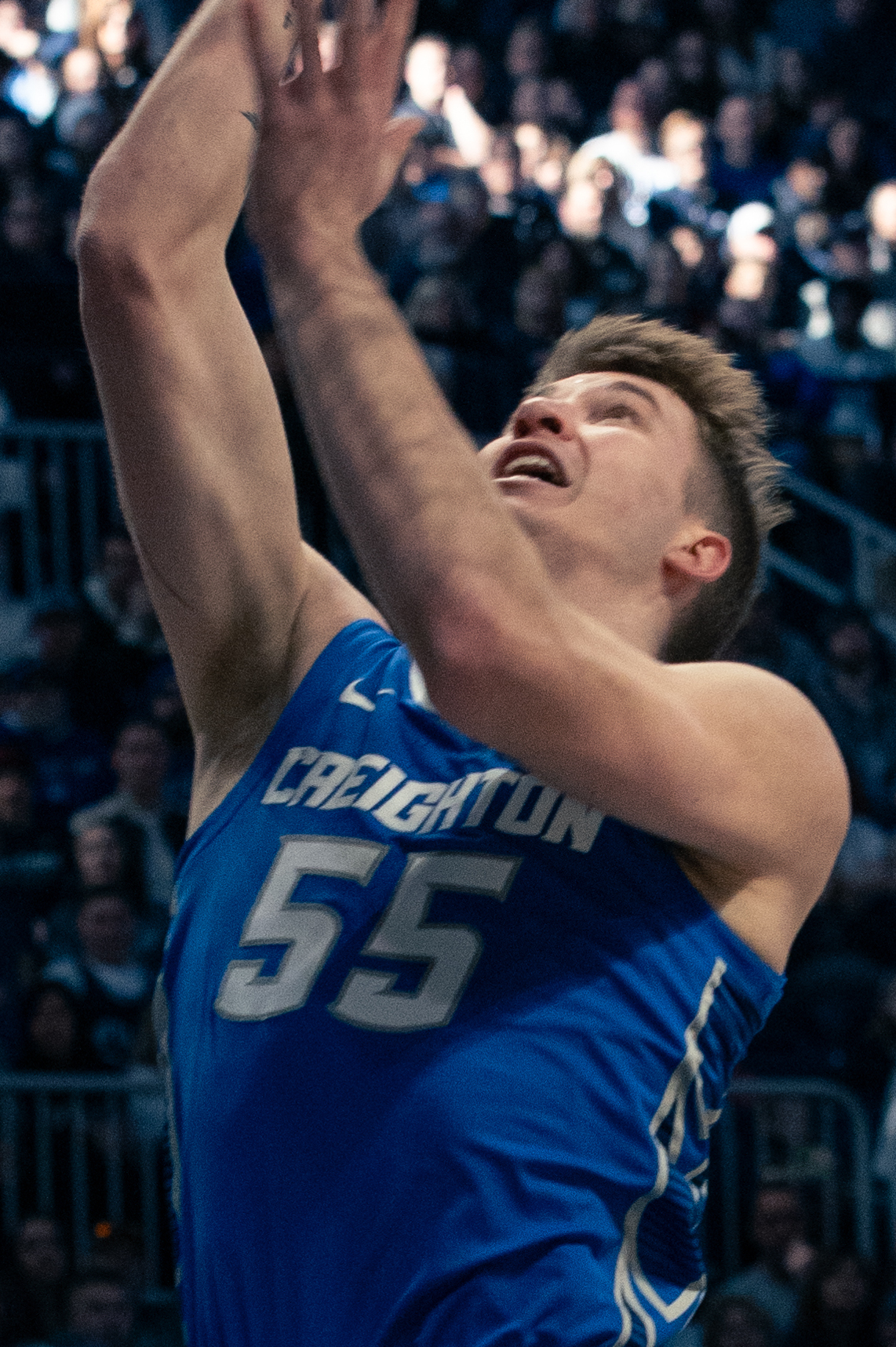
- Scheierman with Creighton in 2024

No. 55 – Boston Celtics
- Position: Shooting guard
- League: NBA

Personal information
- Born: September 26, 2000 (age 26) Hastings, Nebraska, U.S.
- Listed height: 6 ft 6 in (1.98 m)
- Listed weight: 213 lb (97 kg)

Career information
- High school: Aurora (Aurora, Nebraska)
- College: South Dakota State (2019–2022); Creighton (2022–2024)
- NBA draft: 2024: 1st round, 30th overall pick
- Drafted by: Boston Celtics
- Playing career: 2024–present

Career history
- 2024–present: Boston Celtics
- 2024–2025: → Maine Celtics

Career highlights
- Third-team All-American – AP, USBWA, NABC, SN (2024); First-team All-Big East (2024); Honorable mention All-Big East (2023); Summit League Player of the Year (2022); 2× First-team All-Summit League (2021, 2022)
- Stats at NBA.com
- Stats at Basketball Reference

Baylor Arthur Scheierman (born September 26, 2000) is an American professional basketball player for the Boston Celtics of the National Basketball Association (NBA). He played college basketball for the South Dakota State Jackrabbits and the Creighton Bluejays.

== High school career ==
Scheierman attended Aurora High School in Aurora, Nebraska, where he competed in basketball, football, baseball, and golf. As a junior, he averaged 16.1 points, six rebounds and six assists per game. He averaged 22.1 points, 9.8 rebounds and 6.5 assists per game as a senior and helped Aurora reach the state basketball tournament.

As Aurora's quarterback, Scheierman threw for 3,942 yards and a then-state-record 59 touchdowns during his senior season, leading the school to the Nebraska Class C-1 state championship. He committed to play college basketball for South Dakota State in November 2017.

== College career ==
As a freshman at South Dakota State, Scheierman averaged 6.0 points, 4.7 rebounds and 2.2 assists per game. He increased his averages to 15.4 points, 9.2 rebounds and 4.0 assists as a sophomore and was named first-team All-Summit League. During his junior season, he averaged 16.2 points, 7.8 rebounds and 4.5 assists per game, led the conference in both rebounds and assists, and was named the Summit League Player of the Year.

Following his junior season, Scheierman entered the NCAA transfer portal and declared for the 2022 NBA draft while maintaining his collegiate eligibility. On May 3, 2022, he committed to Creighton while remaining in the draft. He withdrew from the draft on May 24.

In his first season at Creighton, Scheierman averaged 12.8 points, 8.3 rebounds and 3.3 assists per game, received honorable-mention All-Big East recognition and helped the Bluejays reach the Elite Eight of the 2023 NCAA Division I men's basketball tournament. He returned for his final season of eligibility. During the 2023–24 season, Scheierman averaged 18.5 points, 9.0 rebounds and 3.9 assists per game. He became the first Creighton player to record a triple-double in points, rebounds and assists when he had 15 points, 11 rebounds and 11 assists against Georgetown, and he helped Creighton advance to the Sweet Sixteen of the 2024 NCAA Division I men's basketball tournament. He was a unanimous first-team All-Big East selection and received third-team All-America honors from the Associated Press, USBWA, NABC and The Sporting News.

== Professional career ==
Scheierman was selected by the Boston Celtics with the 30th overall pick in the 2024 NBA draft on June 26, 2024. He signed with the Celtics on July 6. Scheierman made his NBA debut against the Washington Wizards on October 24, scoring four points and recording one rebound in eight minutes. During his rookie season, Boston assigned him to its NBA G League affiliate, the Maine Celtics, eight times between November 5, 2024, and February 3, 2025.

On March 18, 2025, Scheierman scored a then-career-high 20 points and made six three-pointers in a 104–96 win over the Brooklyn Nets. He made his first NBA start on April 9 against the Orlando Magic. He finished his rookie season having appeared in 31 games, including two starts, and averaged 3.6 points per game.

On October 30, 2025, the Celtics exercised Scheierman's team option for the 2026–27 season. During his second NBA season, he appeared in 77 games, made 20 starts and averaged 5.5 points and 3.5 rebounds while shooting 39.9 percent from three-point range. On April 12, 2026, Scheierman scored a career-high 30 points and added seven rebounds and seven assists in a 113–108 victory over the Magic in Boston's final regular-season game.

== Career statistics ==
Legend
GP	Games played	GS	Games started	MPG	Minutes per game
FG%	Field goal percentage	3P%	3-point field goal percentage	FT%	Free throw percentage
RPG	Rebounds per game	APG	Assists per game	SPG	Steals per game
BPG	Blocks per game	PPG	Points per game	**Bold**	Career high

=== NBA ===
==== Regular season ====
Year	Team	GP	GS	MPG	FG%	3P%	FT%	RPG	APG	SPG	BPG	PPG
2024–25	Boston	31	2	12.4	.355	.317	.750	2.1	1.1	**.5**	**.1**	3.6
2025–26	Boston	**77**	**20**	**18.6**	**.453**	**.399**	**.903**	**3.5**	**1.5**	**.5**	**.1**	**5.5**
Career		108	22	16.8	.429	.378	.860	3.1	1.4	.5	.1	5.0

==== Playoffs ====
Year	Team	GP	GS	MPG	FG%	3P%	FT%	RPG	APG	SPG	BPG	PPG
2025	Boston	4	0	5.5	.300	**.400**	–	1.0	.0	.0	.0	2.0
2026	Boston	**7**	**1**	**14.1**	**.423**	.381	–	**2.9**	**.6**	**.9**	**.1**	**4.3**
Career		11	1	11.0	.389	.385	–	2.2	.4	.5	.1	3.5

=== College ===
Year	Team	GP	GS	MPG	FG%	3P%	FT%	RPG	APG	SPG	BPG	PPG
2019–20	South Dakota State	32	3	20.2	.427	.247	.667	4.7	2.2	.4	**.2**	6.0
2020–21	South Dakota State	23	23	35.2	.498	.438	.845	**9.2**	4.0	1.0	**.2**	15.4
2021–22	South Dakota State	35	35	33.3	**.508**	**.469**	.802	7.8	**4.5**	**1.3**	.1	16.2
2022–23	Creighton	**37**	**37**	32.7	.424	.364	.840	8.3	3.3	1.0	**.2**	12.8
2023–24	Creighton	35	35	**36.8**	.448	.381	**.876**	9.0	3.9	.9	.1	**18.5**
Career		162	133	31.6	.461	.390	.820	7.8	3.6	.9	.2	13.8

== Personal life ==
Scheierman's father, Scott, played basketball, and his mother, Shannon, played volleyball at Hastings College.

== See also ==
- List of NCAA Division I men's basketball players with 2,000 points and 1,000 rebounds
