= Amari Williams =

British basketball player (born 2002)

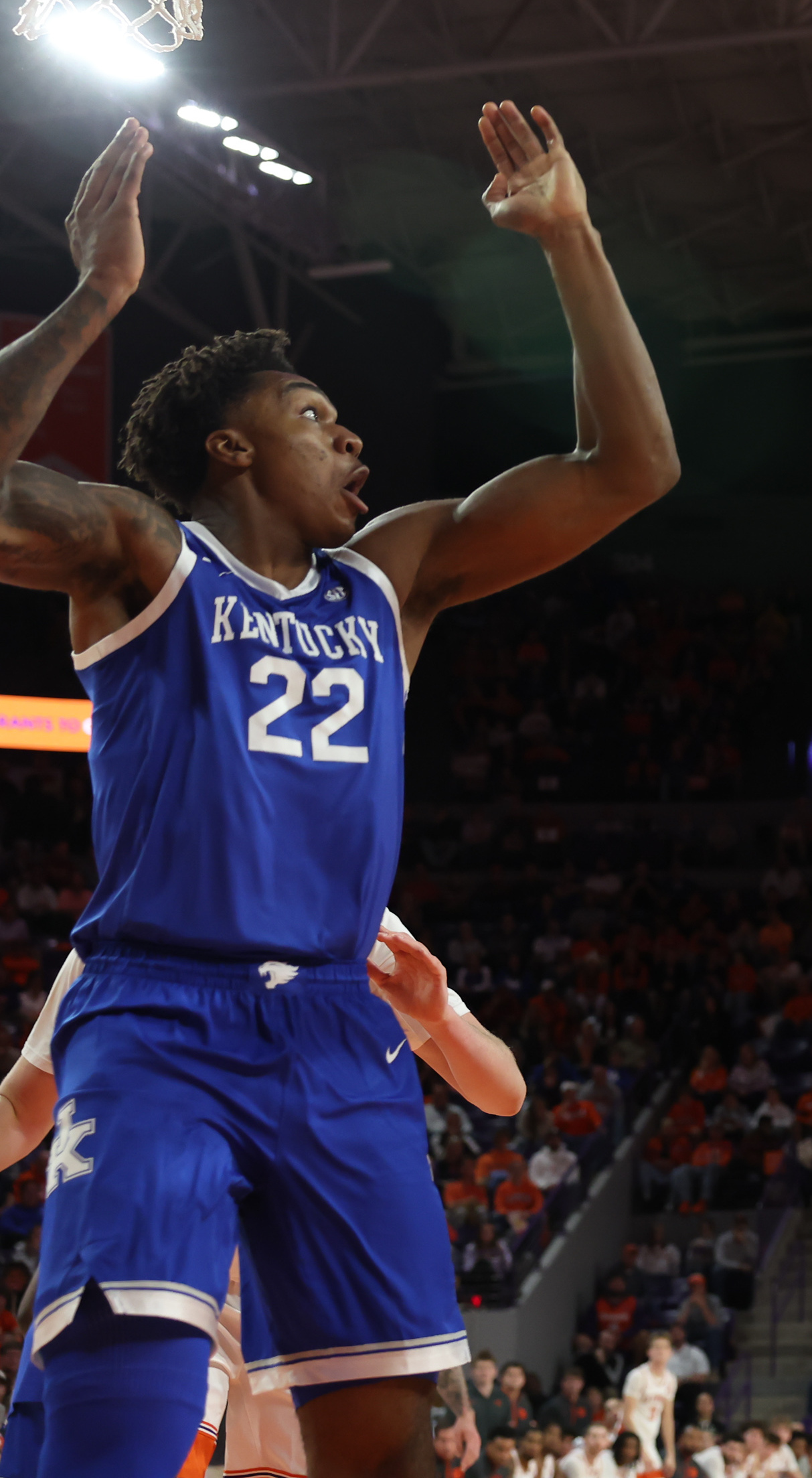
- Williams with Kentucky in 2024

No. 77 – Boston Celtics
- Position: Center
- League: NBA

Personal information
- Born: 28 January 2002 (age 24) Nottingham, England
- Listed height: 6 ft 11 in (2.11 m)
- Listed weight: 269 lb (122 kg)

Career information
- High school: Myerscough College (Preston, Lancashire)
- College: Drexel (2020–2024); Kentucky (2024–2025)
- NBA draft: 2025: 2nd round, 46th overall pick
- Drafted by: Orlando Magic
- Playing career: 2025–present

Career history
- 2025–present: Boston Celtics
- 2025–present: →Maine Celtics

Career highlights
- 3× CAA Defensive Player of the Year (2022–2024); 2× First-team All-CAA (2023, 2024); Third-team All-CAA (2022); 3× CAA All-Defensive Team (2022–2024)
- Stats at NBA.com
- Stats at Basketball Reference

Amari Williams (born 28 January 2002) is a British professional basketball player for the Boston Celtics of the National Basketball Association (NBA), on a two-way contract with the Maine Celtics of the NBA G League.

He played college basketball for the Drexel Dragons and the Kentucky Wildcats. Williams was selected by the Orlando Magic with the 46th overall pick in the second round of the 2025 NBA draft, but was immediately traded to the Celtics.

== Early life ==
Williams grew up in Nottingham, England and initially attended Trinity School, Nottingham. and played for his local team the Mansfield Giants. He transferred to Myerscough College when he was 16 years old. Williams primarily played football when growing up.

== College career ==
=== Drexel ===
Williams began his college career with the Drexel Dragons. He was named the Colonial Athletic Association (CAA) Defensive Player of the Year and third-team all-conference as a sophomore. Williams repeated as CAA Defensive Player of the Year and was named first-team all-conference while averaging 13.7 points, 8.8 rebounds, and 2.2 blocks per game. As a senior, Williams averaged 12.2 points, 7.8 rebounds, and 1.8 blocks per game and was named the CAA Defensive Player of the Year for a third straight season. After the end of the season, Williams decided to utilize the extra year of eligibility granted to college athletes who played in the 2020–2021 season due to the COVID-19 pandemic and entered the NCAA transfer portal.

=== Kentucky ===
Williams transferred to Kentucky. He averaged 10.9 points, 8.5 rebounds, 3.2 assists, and 1.2 blocks per game while starting in all 36 games he appeared in. In 2025, his Wildcats finished with a 24-12 record. Williams' collegiate career ended with Kentucky's 78-65 loss to Tennessee in the 2025 NCAA tournament Sweet 16.

== Professional career ==
=== Boston Celtics ===
Williams was selected in the second round of the 2025 NBA draft with the 46th pick by the Orlando Magic and traded to the Boston Celtics. He participated in the 2025 NBA Summer League for the Celtics.

On August 15, 2025, Boston Celtics announced that they had signed Williams to two-way contract. On February 5, 2026, Boston signed Williams to a two-year, $2.7 million standard contract. He made 22 appearances (including two starts) for Boston during the 2025–26 NBA season, recording averages of 1.4 points, 1.8 rebounds, and 0.5 assists.

On June 29, 2026, it was reported that Williams' standard contract team option was being declined by Boston. On July 2, the Celtics signed Williams to a new two-way contract. Williams participated in the 2026 NBA Summer League as a member of the Celtics.

== National team career ==
Williams has represented Great Britain in international competitions at the under-16, under-18, and under-20 levels.

== Career statistics ==
Legend
| GP | Games played | GS | Games started | MPG | Minutes per game |
| FG% | Field goal percentage | 3P% | 3-point field goal percentage | FT% | Free throw percentage |
| RPG | Rebounds per game | APG | Assists per game | SPG | Steals per game |
| BPG | Blocks per game | PPG | Points per game | **Bold** | Career high |

=== NBA ===
==== Regular season ====
| Year | Team | GP | GS | MPG | FG% | 3P% | FT% | RPG | APG | SPG | BPG | PPG |
|---|---|---|---|---|---|---|---|---|---|---|---|---|
| 2025–26 | Boston | 22 | 2 | 6.6 | .500 | – | .714 | 1.8 | .5 | .1 | .5 | 1.4 |
| Career | | 22 | 2 | 6.6 | .500 | – | .714 | 1.8 | .5 | .1 | .5 | 1.4 |

==== Playoffs ====
| Year | Team | GP | GS | MPG | FG% | 3P% | FT% | RPG | APG | SPG | BPG | PPG |
|---|---|---|---|---|---|---|---|---|---|---|---|---|
| 2026 | Boston | 1 | 0 | 2.0 | .000 | – | .500 | 1.0 | .0 | .0 | .0 | 1.0 |
| Career | | 1 | 0 | 2.0 | .000 | – | .500 | 1.0 | .0 | .0 | .0 | 1.0 |

=== College ===
| Year | Team | GP | GS | MPG | FG% | 3P% | FT% | RPG | APG | SPG | BPG | PPG |
|---|---|---|---|---|---|---|---|---|---|---|---|---|
| 2020–21 | Drexel | 15 | 0 | 4.0 | .429 | .000 | .571 | 1.0 | .6 | .1 | .3 | 1.1 |
| 2021–22 | Drexel | 28 | 17 | 20.6 | .521 | **.500** | .632 | 7.3 | 1.1 | .6 | 2.0 | 9.5 |
| 2022–23 | Drexel | 30 | 30 | **27.4** | .523 | .267 | .606 | **8.8** | 2.3 | **1.4** | **2.2** | **13.7** |
| 2023–24 | Drexel | 32 | 32 | 22.9 | .517 | .333 | **.655** | 7.8 | 1.9 | .8 | 1.8 | 12.2 |
| 2024–25 | Kentucky | **36** | **36** | 22.8 | **.561** | .250 | .623 | 8.5 | **3.2** | .6 | 1.2 | 10.9 |
| Career | | 141 | 115 | 21.4 | .529 | .300 | .628 | 7.4 | 2.0 | .8 | 1.6 | 10.4 |
