= Craig Luschenat =

American basketball player and coach

Boston Celtics
- Position: Assistant coach
- League: NBA

Personal information
- Born: June 30, 1993 (age 33) Boston, Massachusetts, U.S.
- Listed height: 6 ft 0 in (1.83 m)
- Listed weight: 175 lb (79 kg)

Career information
- High school: Andover (Andover, Massachusetts)
- College: Saint Joseph's (ME) (2012–2016)
- NBA draft: 2016: undrafted
- Coaching career: 2018–present

Career history

Coaching
- 2018–2022: Maine Red Claws (assistant)
- 2022–2024: Boston Celtics (player development coach)
- 2024–present: Boston Celtics (assistant)

Craig Jay Luschenat (born June 30, 1993) is an American professional basketball coach and former player who is an assistant coach for the Boston Celtics of the National Basketball Association (NBA).

== Playing career ==
Luschenat played college basketball for the Saint Joseph's College of Maine Monks for four years at the NCAA Division III level.

== Coaching career ==
=== Maine Red Claws (2018-2022) ===
Luschenat began his coaching career in 2018 as an assistant coach for the Maine Red Claws, the NBA G-League affiliate of the Boston Celtics.

=== Boston Celtics (2022-present) ===
In August 2022, Luschenat was hired by the Boston Celtics as a player development coach under head coach Ime Udoka.

From 2022 until 2024, Luschenat worked as a player enhancement coach for the Celtics under head coaches Ime Udoka and Joe Mazzulla. During his tenure as a player enhancement coach, Luschenat and the Celtics went to the NBA Finals in 2024 and won the 2024 NBA championship.

In 2024, Luschenat was promoted to the role of assistant coach under head coach Joe Mazzulla.

== Personal life ==
Luschenat was born in Boston, Massachusetts and attended Andover High School, Luschenat is an alum of Saint Joseph's College of Maine in Standish, Maine. Luschenat also holds a master's degree from Oxford Brookes University.
