= 2023 NBA playoffs =

Professional basketball tournament

Tournament details
- Dates: April 15 – June 12, 2023
- Season: 2022–23
- Teams: 16

Final positions
- Champions: Denver Nuggets (1st title)
- Runners-up: Miami Heat
- Semifinalists: Boston Celtics; Los Angeles Lakers

Tournament statistics
- Scoring leader(s): Nikola Jokić (Nuggets) (30.0 PPG)

Awards
- MVP: Nikola Jokić (Nuggets)

The 2023 NBA playoffs was the postseason tournament of the National Basketball Association's 2022–23 season. The playoffs began on April 15 and concluded on June 12 with the Denver Nuggets defeating the Miami Heat. It was the first title for the Nuggets in franchise history. The Heat became second eighth-seeded team to reach the NBA Finals, after the 1999 New York Knicks.

The Golden State Warriors were the defending champions, but lost to the Los Angeles Lakers in the conference semifinals.

Golden State's Stephen Curry and the Boston Celtics's Jayson Tatum were the first two players to score 50 points in a game seven, with the latter scoring a record 51 points in the conference semifinals against the Philadelphia 76ers. Miami's Jimmy Butler also set a career-high (regular season or playoffs) 56 points this postseason in game 4 of the first round against the Milwaukee Bucks.

== Overview ==
=== Updates to postseason appearances ===
- The Milwaukee Bucks entered the postseason for the seventh consecutive season and also clinched the best record in the NBA for the third time in the last five seasons, winning the inaugural Maurice Podoloff Trophy.
- The Denver Nuggets entered the postseason for the fifth consecutive season and also clinched the best record in the Western Conference for the first time in franchise history.
  - The Nuggets also advanced to the NBA Finals for the first time in franchise history.
- The Boston Celtics entered the postseason for the ninth consecutive season, currently the longest such streak in the NBA and the second-longest playoffs streak in major North American sports behind the MLB's Los Angeles Dodgers after the NHL's Pittsburgh Penguins missed the 2023 Stanley Cup Playoffs for the first time in 16 years.
- The Philadelphia 76ers entered the postseason for the sixth consecutive season.
- The Brooklyn Nets entered the postseason for the fifth consecutive season.
- The Miami Heat entered the postseason for the fourth consecutive season.
  - The Heat also entered the NBA Finals for the first time since 2020 and the seventh time in franchise history. Miami also became the first play-in team to win a playoff series since the play-in tournament was implemented in 2020, as well as the sixth eighth-seed in history, and first since the 2012 Philadelphia 76ers to advance past the first round.
- The Memphis Grizzlies, Phoenix Suns, and Atlanta Hawks entered the postseason for the third consecutive season.
- Both the Golden State Warriors and Minnesota Timberwolves entered the postseason for the second consecutive season.
- The New York Knicks, Los Angeles Clippers, and Los Angeles Lakers entered the postseason for the first time since 2021.
- The Cleveland Cavaliers entered the postseason for the first time since 2018, and the first time without LeBron James on their roster since 1998.
- The Sacramento Kings entered the postseason for the first time since 2006, snapping the longest postseason drought in NBA history.
- The Dallas Mavericks missed the postseason for the first time since 2019.
- The Utah Jazz missed the postseason for the first time since 2016.
- The Charlotte Hornets missed the postseason for the seventh consecutive season, the longest active postseason drought in the NBA.

=== Notable occurrences ===
- For the first time since the 2000–01 season, no team won at least 60 games in an 82-game regular season. (Note: Excluding the 2011–12 season, which was shortened due to the lockout, and the 2019–20 and 2020–21 seasons, both of which were shortened due to the COVID-19 pandemic.)
- This season marked the first time since the 2004–05 season that two of the league's top three scorers (Luka Dončić and Damian Lillard) failed to reach the playoffs.
- All three Texas teams (Dallas, Houston, and San Antonio) missed the playoffs in the same season for the first time since the Mavericks formed in 1980. This also marked the first time since 1976 that Texas did not appear in the playoffs.
- All four California teams (Golden State Warriors, Los Angeles Clippers, Los Angeles Lakers, and Sacramento Kings) made the playoffs in the same season for the first time since the Kings relocated to Sacramento in 1985.
- All five teams from the Pacific Division qualified for the playoffs, marking the third instance every team in a division qualified for the playoffs since the NBA adopted the current six division format in 2004–05. Previously, all five teams from the Central Division during the 2005–06 season and the Southwest Division during the 2014–15 season qualified for the playoffs.
- A No. 10 seed advanced to the second stage of the play-in tournament for the first time since the implementation of the Page–McIntyre system in 2021.
- The Miami Heat became the first team since the 2001 Indiana Pacers to drop from a No. 1 seed in the playoffs to a No. 8 seed the following year.

==== First round ====
- The Philadelphia 76ers swept the Brooklyn Nets, marking the 47th year in a row that a sweep occurred. The last time a sweep did not occur was in 1976. This was the 183rd series sweep in NBA playoffs history.
- Ja Morant scored 22 straight points for the Memphis Grizzlies in game 3 against the Los Angeles Lakers, becoming the first player to score at least 22 straight points for their team in a playoff game since Kobe Bryant in 2010.
- Jimmy Butler became the sixth player in NBA history to score 56 or more points in a playoff game, joining Michael Jordan (twice), Elgin Baylor, Donovan Mitchell, Charles Barkley, and Wilt Chamberlain.
- Devin Booker became the third player since 1997 to score at least 25 points in a quarter in a playoff game, joining Damian Lillard (25 in 2019) and Allen Iverson (26 in 2001).
- Devin Booker and Kevin Durant became the first duo in playoff history to each score 25-plus points in each of their first six games of a postseason.
- The New York Knicks won a playoff series for the first time since 2013.
- Giannis Antetokounmpo missed 13 free throws in game 5 against the Heat, marking the most free throw misses in a playoff game since DeAndre Jordan in 2015, and the most misses in any game (regular season or playoffs) since Ben Simmons in 2017.
- The Heat became the first play–in team in NBA history to win a playoff series.
- The eighth-seeded Heat defeated the top-seeded Milwaukee Bucks in five games, marking the sixth instance in NBA history of an 8th-seeded team defeating a 1st-seeded team in the first round, following previous instances in 1994, 1999, 2007, 2011, and 2012. Additionally, this was the fourth time such an upset occurred in a best-of-seven series, and the first to be completed in fewer than six games.
- The seventh-seeded Lakers defeated the second-seeded Grizzlies in six games, marking the sixth instance in NBA history of a 7th-seeded team defeating a 2nd-seeded team in the first round, following previous instances in 1987, 1989, 1991, 1998, and 2010. Additionally, this was only the second time such an upset occurred in a best-of-seven series.
- A seventh-seed (Lakers) and an eighth-seed (Heat) both advanced in the first round of the playoffs, marking the first time this happened since the 16-team format began in 1984. In all previous instances when a seventh or eighth seed advanced, only one or the other advanced (not both).
- The Kings–Warriors series was the first of the 2023 playoffs to have a game 7, making it the 24th consecutive NBA postseason to feature a game 7. The last time a game 7 did not occur in the playoffs was 1999. This was the 148th game 7 in NBA playoffs history.
- Stephen Curry's 50 points against the Kings was the first 50-point performance in a game 7 in NBA history.

==== Conference semifinals ====
- This was the first time in NBA history that every seed number from 1 through 8 made it to the second round across both conferences.
  - This also guaranteed that this would be the third straight season where all four teams competing in the conference finals were different seed numbers.
- The sixth-seeded Warriors had home-court advantage in the western semifinals, becoming the lowest seed to have home-court advantage since the sixth-seeded Houston Rockets in 1987.
- P. J. Tucker had zero field goal attempts and zero free throw attempts in 37 minutes played against the Boston Celtics, marking the most minutes played without a field goal or free throw attempt in a playoff game in the shot-clock era (since 1954–55).
- Devin Booker's 35.9 points per game were the most through a player's first ten games of a postseason since Michael Jordan in 1990.
- The Denver Nuggets' 81 first-half points in game 6 against the Phoenix Suns were the most in a first half by an away team in postseason history.
- Jalen Brunson became the fourth player in NBA history to make more field goals than the rest of the team combined in an elimination game, joining LeBron James (twice), Kobe Bryant, and Penny Hardaway.
- With the defending champion Warriors losing to the Los Angeles Lakers, the 2023 playoffs marked the fourth straight year where the defending champion was eliminated before the conference finals.
- The Warriors lost a playoff series to a Western Conference opponent for the first time in the Steve Kerr era (since 2014–15).
- With the Lakers' series win over the Warriors, LeBron James earned his 41st career playoff series win, setting a new NBA record for the most career playoff series wins and surpassing Derek Fisher's previous record of 40.
- After losing Game 5 in the Warriors series, LeBron James lost 3 consecutive games at the first chance of clinching a series. The streak included Game 5 losses to the Grizzlies in the previous round this year and to the Heat in the 2020 Finals. Before the current losing streak, James won 5 straight and 15 of his last 16, with the lone loss being in the first round to the Pacers in 2018
- Jayson Tatum's 51 points against the 76ers were the most in a game 7 in NBA history.
  - Additionally, his 51 points and zero turnovers set a playoff record for the most points in a game without any turnovers.
- There were four 50-point games this postseason, the most in a single postseason.
- Doc Rivers, as a coach, has now blown seven 3–2 series leads. Out of those seven, three of them were 3–1 series leads.

==== Conference finals ====
- The Heat became the second eight-seeded team to reach the conference finals, joining the 1999 New York Knicks.
  - The Heat also became the first eight-seeded team to reach the conference finals in a full 82-game season, as the 1998–99 season was shortened due to a lockout.
- The Lakers became the second seven-seeded team to reach the conference finals, joining the 1987 Seattle SuperSonics.
- All four teams in the conference finals from the 2020 Bubble returned to the 2023 conference finals.
  - Like the aforementioned season, the Heat and Celtics have both beaten the Bucks and 76ers, respectively. The Heat also had beaten the Celtics in the Eastern Conference finals.
- The Heat became the fifth team to win the series opener on the road in each of their first three playoff series, joining the 1981 Houston Rockets, 1989 Chicago Bulls, 1999 New York Knicks, and 2021 Atlanta Hawks.
- The Heat became the first eight-seeded team since the 1999 Knicks to go up 3–0 in a series.
- The Heat became the first eight-seeded team to win a playoff game by more than 25 points.
- The Celtics lost their 6th game 7 at home this year, with previous losses in 1973, 1982, 2005, 2009 and 2018, while no other team has lost more than three. Both the Heat (2000, 2005, 2022) and the Suns (1981, 1995, 2022) lost three games 7 at home.
- This was the second instance (following the 2015 playoffs) where both conference finals series had teams go up 3–0 in the series. However, the difference is that the Nuggets completed their sweep while the Celtics won three straight games but fell short.
- Nikola Jokić recorded his eighth triple-double of the 2023 playoffs in game 4 against the Lakers, breaking the record held by Wilt Chamberlain for the most triple-doubles in a single postseason.
- The Nuggets beat the Lakers 4–0 in the conference finals, marking their first playoff series sweep in franchise history.
  - The Nuggets also became the last of the four teams from the American Basketball Association to reach the NBA Finals.
  - The Nuggets also eliminated the Lakers in the playoffs for the first time in eight encounters, having been eliminated by the Lakers in 1979, 1985, 1987, 2008, 2009, 2012 and 2020.
- This marked the third time LeBron James was swept in a playoff series. The last two times he was swept were in the NBA Finals against the San Antonio Spurs in 2007 and the Golden State Warriors in 2018.
- Jokić became the second player to average a triple-double in multiple playoff series in a single postseason, joining Wilt Chamberlain in 1967.
- The Celtics became the fourth team ever to force a game 7 after trailing 0–3 in a series, and the first team to do so since 2003.
  - Additionally, the Celtics became the first team to host a game 7 after trailing 0–3.
- Derrick White became the second player in NBA history to hit a buzzer-beater with his team trailing and facing elimination, joining Michael Jordan's "The Shot" in 1989.
  - It was also the sixth game-winning buzzer-beater when facing elimination in NBA history, and the first since Kawhi Leonard in 2019. Coincidentally, Jimmy Butler has been on the losing side of three of those buzzer-beaters.
- Jaylen Brown became the fifth player with 8-plus turnovers in a game 7 since individual turnovers were tracked in 1978, joining Shawn Kemp, LeBron James, Donovan Mitchell, and Joel Embiid.

==== NBA Finals ====
- The Heat became the second eight-seeded team to reach the NBA Finals, joining the 1999 New York Knicks. Coincidentally, both the Knicks and the Heat beat each other during their respective run to the Finals.
  - The Heat also became the first eight-seeded team to reach the Finals in a full 82-game season, as the 1998–99 season was shortened due to a lockout.
  - For the first time, an NHL and NBA team from the same metro area made the final as the lowest seed in the same season. Ironically, both the Heat and the Florida Panthers would lose to the number 1 seed in the Western Conference in 5 games.
- The Heat became the first team to make the NBA Finals after making the playoffs via the Play-In tournament.
- The Heat became the third team in NBA history to finish last in PPG (points per game) during the regular season and reach the NBA Finals, joining the 1956 Fort Wayne Pistons and 1964 San Francisco Warriors.
- In game 1, the Heat had two free throw attempts, breaking the NBA record for the fewest free throw attempts in a playoff game. The previous playoff record was three, by the New Jersey Nets in 1993 and the previous Finals record was five, by the Los Angeles Lakers in 1983.
- The Heat collected their 13th win of the playoffs in game 2 against the Nuggets, breaking a tie with the 1999 Knicks for the most wins ever by a No. 8 seed in a single postseason.
- In game 3, Nikola Jokić and Jamal Murray became the first teammates to record a triple-double in the NBA Finals and the first teammates to both record 30-point triple-doubles in any game.
- Udonis Haslem, aged 42 years, 363 days, became the oldest player to play in the NBA Finals, coming off the bench in the last minute.
- Nikola Jokić became the first player in NBA history to put up at least 500 points, 250 rebounds, and 150 assists in a single postseason run.
- Nikola Jokić became the first player in NBA history to lead the league in points (600), rebounds (269), and assists (190) in a single postseason.
- Nikola Jokić was the lowest-selected player to be named NBA Finals MVP. Jokić was selected 41st overall in the 2014 NBA draft.
- The Nuggets became the first Western Conference team not located in California or Texas to win the NBA Finals since 1979.

== Format ==
Eight teams from each conference participated in the playoffs. The top six teams in each conference, based on winning percentage, directly qualified for the playoffs; the seeding order of those teams was also based on winning percentage. If two or more teams had the same record, standard NBA tiebreaker rules were used.

The NBA Board of Governors adopted a format starting in 2021 to have a play-in tournament involving the teams ranked 7th through 10th in each conference and made permanent starting this season. The 7th-place team and 8th-place team participated in a "double-chance" game, with the winner advancing to the playoffs as the 7-seed. The loser then played the winner of the elimination game between the 9th-place and 10th-place teams to determine the playoff's 8-seed. The NBA's regular playoff format then proceeded as normal. Furthermore, the winner of the match between the loser of the 7/8 game and the winner of the 9/10 game always plays on day 2 of the NBA playoffs to allow that team at least a day of rest

Each conference's bracket was fixed with no reseeding. All rounds were a best-of-seven series; a series ended when one team won four games, and that team advanced to the next round. All rounds, including the NBA Finals, were in a 2–2–1–1–1 format with regards to hosting. In the conference playoffs, home-court advantage went to the higher-seeded team (number one being the highest). For the NBA Finals, home-court advantage went to the team with the better regular season record, and, if needed, ties were broken based on head-to-head record, followed by intra-conference record.

== Playoff qualifying ==
On March 14, 2023, the Milwaukee Bucks became the first team to clinch a playoff spot. While noted in the below tables, division titles have no bearing on seeding.

Seeds 7 and 8 in each conference were determined via the first-stage play-in tournament, held April 11–14.

=== Eastern Conference ===
Seed	Team	Record	Clinched				
Seed	Team	Record	Play-in berth	Playoff berth	Division title	Best record in conference	Best record in NBA
1	Milwaukee Bucks	58–24	—	March 14	March 28	April 5	April 5
2	Boston Celtics	57–25	—	March 18	April 5	—	—
3	Philadelphia 76ers	54–28	—	March 21	—	—	—
4	Cleveland Cavaliers	51–31	—	March 26	—	—	—
5	New York Knicks	47–35	—	April 2	—	—	—
6	Brooklyn Nets	45–37	—	April 7	—	—	—
7	Atlanta Hawks	41–41	April 5	April 11	—	—	—
8	Miami Heat	44–38	April 7	April 14	April 6	—	—

Toronto (41–41) and Chicago (40–42) also secured play-in berths but did not advance to the playoffs.

=== Western Conference ===
Seed	Team	Record	Clinched				
Seed	Team	Record	Play-in berth	Playoff berth	Division title	Best record in conference	Best record in NBA
1	Denver Nuggets	53–29	—	March 16	March 16	April 5	—
2	Memphis Grizzlies	51–31	—	March 24	March 22	—	—
3	Sacramento Kings	48–34	—	March 29	April 4	—	—
4	Phoenix Suns	45–37	—	April 4	—	—	—
5	Los Angeles Clippers	44–38	—	April 9	—	—	—
6	Golden State Warriors	44–38	—	April 9	—	—	—
7	Los Angeles Lakers	43–39	April 9	April 11	—	—	—
8	Minnesota Timberwolves	42–40	April 8	April 14	—	—	—

New Orleans (42–40) and Oklahoma City (40–42) also secured play-in berths but did not advance to the playoffs.

=== Play-in tournament brackets ===
==== Eastern Conference ====
Play-in games
7	Miami	105
8	Atlanta	116
9	Toronto	105
10	Chicago	109

No. 8 seed game
7	Miami	102
10	Chicago	91

Final seeds
8	Atlanta	No. 7 seed
7	Miami	No. 8 seed

Bold Game winner
Italic Team with home-court advantage

==== Western Conference ====
Play-in games
7	LA Lakers	108 (OT)
8	Minnesota	102
9	New Orleans	118
10	Oklahoma City	123

No. 8 seed game
8	Minnesota	120
10	Oklahoma City	95

Final seeds
7	LA Lakers	No. 7 seed
8	Minnesota	No. 8 seed

Bold Game winner
Italic Team with home-court advantage

== Bracket ==
Teams in bold advanced to the next round. The numbers to the left of each team indicate the team's seeding in its conference, and the numbers to the right indicate the number of games the team won in that round. The division champions are marked by an asterisk. Teams with home-court advantage (i.e., the higher-seeded team) are shown in italics.

First round	Conference semifinals
E1	Milwaukee*	1
**E8**	**Miami***	**4**
**E8**	**Miami***	**4**
E5	New York	2
E4	Cleveland	1
**E5**	**New York**	**4**
**Eastern Conference**
**E3**	**Philadelphia**	**4**
E6	Brooklyn	0
E3	Philadelphia	3
**E2**	**Boston***	**4**
**E2**	**Boston***	**4**
E7	Atlanta	2
**W1**	**Denver***	**4**
W8	Minnesota	1
**W1**	**Denver***	**4**
W4	Phoenix	2
**W4**	**Phoenix**	**4**
W5	LA Clippers	1
**Western Conference**
W3	Sacramento*	3
**W6**	**Golden State**	**4**
W6	Golden State	2
**W7**	**LA Lakers**	**4**
W2	Memphis*	2
**W7**	**LA Lakers**	**4**

Conference finals
**E8**	**Miami***	**4**
E2	Boston*	3
**W1**	**Denver***	**4**
W7	LA Lakers	0

NBA Finals
E8	Miami*	1
**W1**	**Denver***	**4**

- * Division winner
- **Bold** Series winner
- Italic Team with home-court advantage

== First round ==
Note: Times are EDT (UTC−4) as listed by the NBA. If the venue is located in a different time zone, the local time is also given.

=== Eastern Conference first round ===
==== (1) Milwaukee Bucks vs. (8) Miami Heat ====
TNT

April 16
5:30 p.m. (4:30 p.m. CDT)

Recap

Miami Heat 130, Milwaukee Bucks 117
Scoring by quarter: 33–24, 35–31, 34–33, 28–29
Pts: Jimmy Butler 35; Rebs: Bam Adebayo 9 Asts: Jimmy Butler 11	Pts: Khris Middleton 33; Rebs: Khris Middleton 9 Asts: Jrue Holiday 16
Miami leads series, 1–0

Fiserv Forum, Milwaukee, WI
Attendance: 17,381
Referees: Tony Brothers, Tyler Ford, Michael Smith

The Heat took advantage of Giannis Antetokounmpo's early exit in the first half to secure a 1–0 series lead. Jimmy Butler led Miami with 35 points, while Bam Adebayo contributed 22 points, nine rebounds, and seven assists. However, the Heat also suffered a setback, as they lost Tyler Herro to a broken hand in the second quarter. Miami had built a 68–55 halftime lead before Herro's departure and maintained their advantage by shooting an impressive 60% from beyond the arc, their highest percentage of the season. Khris Middleton stepped up for the Bucks, finishing with 33 points and nine rebounds, but Milwaukee shooting 24.4% from the three-point line hindered any chance at a comeback.

NBA TV

April 19
9:00 p.m. (8:00 p.m. CDT)

Recap

Miami Heat 122, Milwaukee Bucks 138
Scoring by quarter: 28–35, 27–46, 30–37, 37–20
Pts: Jimmy Butler 25; Rebs: Cody Zeller 8 Asts: Caleb Martin 6	Pts: Brook Lopez 25; Rebs: Bobby Portis 15; Asts: Jrue Holiday 11
Series tied, 1–1

Fiserv Forum, Milwaukee, WI
Attendance: 17,576
Referees: John Goble, Brian Forte, Tre Maddox

After shooting 11-of-45 from three-point range in their Game 1 loss, the Bucks shot 25-of-49 from beyond the arc, tying the 2016 Cleveland Cavaliers for the most three-point makes by a team in a playoff game. Despite Giannis Antetokounmpo's absence, Milwaukee managed to dominate the Heat thanks to a team effort, as six Bucks players scored at least 16 points. Brook Lopez scored 25 points, Jrue Holiday added 24 points, and Pat Connaughton dropped a playoff career-high 22 points, shooting 6-of-10 from beyond the arc. Jimmy Butler scored 25 for Miami, but it was not enough to keep up with the hot shooting of the Bucks, as they led by as much as 36 points.

ESPN

April 22
7:30 p.m.

Recap

Milwaukee Bucks 99, Miami Heat 121
Scoring by quarter: 21–29, 32–37, 26–28, 20–27
Pts: Khris Middleton 23; Rebs: Bobby Portis 10; Asts: Khris Middleton 6	Pts: Jimmy Butler 30; Rebs: Adebayo, Martin 11 each Asts: Bam Adebayo 5
Miami leads series, 2–1

Kaseya Center, Miami, FL
Attendance: 19,734
Referees: Eric Lewis, Kevin Scott, Rodney Mott

The No. 8 seeded Heat retook their series lead with a 121–99 victory over the shorthanded Bucks. Jimmy Butler led the way for Miami with 30 points in 28 minutes on 12-of-19 shooting. After Milwaukee went 10-of-18 (56%) from deep in the first half, they cooled off after halftime, shooting only 5-of-21 (24%) from three-point range in the second half. Khris Middleton scored 23 points, while Jrue Holiday added 19 and Grayson Allen scored 14. Meanwhile, Miami's Duncan Robinson scored 20 points on his 29th birthday, while Kyle Lowry added 15 points as the Heat led by as much as 29 points. The win was bittersweet for Miami, as Victor Oladipo left the game with a season-ending knee injury in the fourth quarter.

TNT

April 24
7:30 p.m.

Recap

Milwaukee Bucks 114, Miami Heat 119
Scoring by quarter: 33–28, 24–22, 32–28, 25–41
Pts: Brook Lopez 36; Rebs: Brook Lopez 11; Asts: Giannis Antetokounmpo 13	Pts: Jimmy Butler 56; Rebs: Butler, Martin 9 each Asts: Gabe Vincent 8
Miami leads series, 3–1

Kaseya Center, Miami, FL
Attendance: 19,614
Referees: Marc Davis, Mark Lindsay, Jacyn Goble

Jimmy Butler scored a career-high 56 points, which included 21 in the fourth quarter to push the team with the best overall record on the verge of elimination. Down by 12 with under six minutes remaining, the Heat went on a pivotal 27–8 run, which included a 13–0 run to take their first lead of the night. Butler, who scored 22 of Miami's 28 first quarter points, finished 19-of-28 from the field, 15-of-18 from the foul line, and added nine rebounds. His 56 points also set a franchise playoff record for the Heat. Brook Lopez was the leading scorer for the Bucks, with 36 points and 11 rebounds. Giannis Antetokounmpo returned from a two-game absence with a bruised back and had a triple-double, with 26 points, ten rebounds, and 13 assists.

NBA TV

April 26
9:30 p.m. (8:30 p.m. CDT)

Recap

Miami Heat 128, Milwaukee Bucks 126 (OT)
Scoring by quarter: 36–33, 27–36, 23–33, 32–16, Overtime: 10–8
Pts: Jimmy Butler 42; Rebs: Kevin Love 12; Asts: Bam Adebayo 10	Pts: Giannis Antetokounmpo 38; Rebs: Giannis Antetokounmpo 20; Asts: Holiday, Middleton 6 each
Miami wins series, 4–1

Fiserv Forum, Milwaukee, WI
Attendance: 18,113
Referees: James Williams, Sean Wright, Pat Fraher

Two nights after outscoring Milwaukee 30–13 in the final six minutes of a 119–115 victory in Miami, the Heat came back from a 16-point fourth-quarter deficit and tied the game on Jimmy Butler's layup with half a second left in regulation. The Heat went on to win in overtime, becoming the sixth 8-seeded team to knock off a No. 1 seed and the first play-in team ever to win a playoff series. Butler, who averaged 37.6 points throughout the series, led Miami with 42 points, while Bam Adebayo dropped a 20-point triple-double. Khris Middleton scored 33 points for the Bucks, while Giannis Antetokounmpo had 38 points and 20 rebounds. However, he missed a career-high 13 free-throw attempts, the most misses by any player in a playoff game since 2015. Despite leading 102–86 heading into the fourth quarter, the Bucks crumbled under pressure, shooting just 5-of-25 from the floor in the final quarter and overtime.

The Heat's upset of the Bucks was seen as reminiscent of the series that occurred in the 2020 NBA Bubble, where the Heat also toppled the higher-seeded Bucks in five games.

Regular-season series
Tied 2–2 in the regular-season series

January 12, 2023

Recap

Milwaukee Bucks 102, Miami Heat 108

FTX Arena, Miami, FL

January 14, 2023

Recap

Milwaukee Bucks 95, Miami Heat 111

Miami-Dade Arena, Miami, FL

February 4, 2023

Recap

Miami Heat 115, Milwaukee Bucks 123

Fiserv Forum, Milwaukee, WI

February 24, 2023

Recap

Miami Heat 99, Milwaukee Bucks 128

Fiserv Forum, Milwaukee, WI

This was the fourth playoff meeting between these two teams, with the Heat winning two of the first three meetings.

Previous playoff series
Miami leads 2–1 in all-time playoff series

2013

Miami Heat 4, Milwaukee Bucks 0

2013 Eastern Conference First Round

2020

Milwaukee Bucks 1, Miami Heat 4

2020 Eastern Conference semifinals

2021

Milwaukee Bucks 4, Miami Heat 0

2021 Eastern Conference First Round

==== (2) Boston Celtics vs. (7) Atlanta Hawks ====
ESPN

April 15
3:30 p.m.

Recap

Atlanta Hawks 99, Boston Celtics 112
Scoring by quarter: 19–29, 25–45, 31–20, 24–18
Pts: Dejounte Murray 24; Rebs: Capela, Murray 8 each Asts: Trae Young 8	Pts: Jaylen Brown 29; Rebs: Jaylen Brown 12; Asts: Smart, White 7 each
Boston leads series, 1–0

TD Garden, Boston, MA
Attendance: 19,156
Referees: David Guthrie, Bill Kennedy, Ben Taylor

Jaylen Brown guided Boston to a 112–99 victory with 29 points and 12 rebounds, while Jayson Tatum added 25 points, 21 of which came in the first half as the Celtics built a 30-point lead at halftime. Derrick White also had a strong performance with 24 points and seven assists. The Hawks meanwhile struggled with their shooting, missing their first ten three-point attempts and shooting 5-of-29 from beyond the arc for the game. Despite a late push from Atlanta in the fourth quarter, the Celtics regained control and secured the victory, as they held Dejounte Murray and Trae Young to a combined 15-of-43 shooting.

NBA TV

April 18
7:00 p.m.

Recap

Atlanta Hawks 106, Boston Celtics 119
Scoring by quarter: 25–28, 24–33, 32–29, 25–29
Pts: Dejounte Murray 29; Rebs: De'Andre Hunter 12; Asts: Murray, Young 6 each	Pts: Jayson Tatum 29; Rebs: Jayson Tatum 10; Asts: Malcolm Brogdon 8
Boston leads series, 2–0

TD Garden, Boston, MA
Attendance: 19,156
Referees: Mark Lindsay, Karl Lane, James Williams

Jayson Tatum led the Celtics to a 2–0 series lead over the Hawks, finishing with 29 points and ten rebounds. The Hawks once again tried mounting a comeback, as they pulled within eight points with under eight minutes left in regulation. However, the Celtics responded with a 20–6 run to put the game out of reach. Derrick White contributed 26 points, seven rebounds, and three blocks for Boston, while Jaylen Brown added 18 points. Although Young and Dejounte Murray combined for 53 points, Atlanta could not keep up with Boston, who outscored them 64–40 in the paint.

ESPN

April 21
7:00 p.m.

Recap

Boston Celtics 122, Atlanta Hawks 130
Scoring by quarter: 37–33, 30–41, 26–26, 29–30
Pts: Jayson Tatum 29; Rebs: Jayson Tatum 10; Asts: Marcus Smart 8	Pts: Trae Young 32; Rebs: Clint Capela 11; Asts: Trae Young 9
Boston leads series, 2–1

State Farm Arena, Atlanta, GA
Attendance: 18,536
Referees: Scott Foster, Pat Fraher, Mitchell Ervin

In danger of falling behind 3–0 in the series, Trae Young scored 32 points and nine assists in his first 30-point game since the Hawks' Conference finals run two years ago as Atlanta put up their most points in a playoff game since 1986. Young was supported by his backcourt partner Dejounte Murray, who had 25 points, six rebounds, and five assists. The duo played their best when it mattered most, as they accounted for 22 of Atlanta's 30 points in the final quarter. Jayson Tatum scored 29 points, while Marcus Smart added 24, but Boston was forced to play catch-up the majority of the game, as they allowed Atlanta to knock down 30-of-46 shots (65%) in the first half.

TNT

April 23
7:00 p.m.

Recap

Boston Celtics 129, Atlanta Hawks 121
Scoring by quarter: 35–25, 30–28, 27–34, 37–34
Pts: Brown, Tatum 31 each Rebs: Robert Williams III 15; Asts: Al Horford 5	Pts: Trae Young 35; Rebs: Dejounte Murray 9 Asts: Trae Young 15
Boston leads series, 3–1

State Farm Arena, Atlanta, GA
Attendance: 19,144
Referees: Zach Zarba, Tyler Ford, Gediminas Petraitis

After starting off the game shooting 1-of-7, Jaylen Brown removed his protective mask in the second quarter as he went on to shoot 11-of-15 the rest of the way, moving Boston to the brink of advancing to the second round. Jayson Tatum also had 31 points for the Celtics, as both Brown and Tatum combined to score their team's final 16 points, thwarting any attempt by the Hawks to even the series. In addition to the duo's combined 62 points, Marcus Smart added 19 points and Derrick White had 18. Although Trae Young scored 35 points and 15 assists, and De'Andre Hunter and Dejounte Murray combined for 50 points, the Hawks were unable to gain a lead after the first quarter.

TNT

April 25
7:30 p.m.

Recap

Atlanta Hawks 119, Boston Celtics 117
Scoring by quarter: 30–27, 28–39, 24–26, 37–25
Pts: Trae Young 38; Rebs: Clint Capela 7 Asts: Trae Young 13	Pts: Jaylen Brown 35; Rebs: Jayson Tatum 8 Asts: Jayson Tatum 8
Boston leads series, 3–2

TD Garden, Boston, MA
Attendance: 19,156
Referees: Josh Tiven, Courtney Kirkland, Tre Maddox

Facing elimination, Trae Young scored 38 points and hit a deep three-pointer with less than two seconds left to give the Hawks the lead and ultimately force a Game 6 in Atlanta. Young also had 16 points in a frenetic fourth quarter, getting support from his teammates who knocked down a series-best 19 three-pointers. John Collins added 22 points for Atlanta, who played without Dejounte Murray, who was suspended for bumping an official in Game 4. Despite an impressive performance from Jaylen Brown, who scored 35 points, and Jayson Tatum, who added 19, the Celtics ultimately lost control of the game in the fourth quarter, allowing Atlanta to outscore them 23–8 in the final minutes, with 14 of those points coming from Young.

TNT

April 27
8:30 p.m.

Recap

Boston Celtics 128, Atlanta Hawks 120
Scoring by quarter: 35–34, 33–33, 30–33, 30–20
Pts: Jaylen Brown 32; Rebs: Jayson Tatum 14; Asts: Jayson Tatum 7	Pts: Trae Young 30; Rebs: Onyeka Okongwu 11; Asts: Dejounte Murray 11
Boston wins series, 4–2

State Farm Arena, Atlanta, GA
Attendance: 19,176
Referees: Marc Davis, Curtis Blair, Jacyn Goble

After collapsing late in Game 5, the Celtics responded by closing out Game 6 on an 18–7 run to advance to their sixth Eastern Semifinals appearance in seven years. Leading the way for the Celtics were Jaylen Brown with 32 points, Jayson Tatum with 30 points and 14 rebounds, Marcus Smart with 22 points, and Malcolm Brogdon with 17 points off the bench. Meanwhile, Trae Young, who finished with 30 points and ten assists, missed 12-of-13 shots in the second half and finished just 9-of-28 from the field. His backcourt partner Dejounte Murray also struggled, scoring zero points in the first half as the duo ultimately combined for a shooting percentage of 34% (14-of-41).

Regular-season series
Boston won 3–0 in the regular-season series

November 16, 2022

Recap

Boston Celtics 126, Atlanta Hawks 101

State Farm Arena, Atlanta, GA

March 11, 2023

Recap

Boston Celtics 134, Atlanta Hawks 125

State Farm Arena, Atlanta, GA

April 9, 2023

Recap

Atlanta Hawks 114, Boston Celtics 120

TD Garden, Boston, MA

This was the 13th playoff meeting between these two teams, and the ninth since the St. Louis Hawks relocated to Atlanta in 1968, with the Celtics winning ten of the first twelve meetings.

Previous playoff series
Boston leads 10–2 in all-time playoff series

1957

Boston Celtics 4, St. Louis Hawks 3

1957 NBA Finals

1958

Boston Celtics 2, St. Louis Hawks 4

1958 NBA Finals

1960

Boston Celtics 4, St. Louis Hawks 3

1960 NBA Finals

1961

Boston Celtics 4, St. Louis Hawks 1

1961 NBA Finals

1972

Boston Celtics 4, Atlanta Hawks 2

1972 Eastern Conference semifinals

1973

Boston Celtics 4, Atlanta Hawks 2

1973 Eastern Conference semifinals

1983

Boston Celtics 2, Atlanta Hawks 1

1983 Eastern Conference First Round

1986

Boston Celtics 4, Atlanta Hawks 1

1986 Eastern Conference semifinals

1988

Boston Celtics 4, Atlanta Hawks 3

1988 Eastern Conference semifinals

2008

Boston Celtics 4, Atlanta Hawks 3

2008 Eastern Conference First Round

2012

Boston Celtics 4, Atlanta Hawks 2

2012 Eastern Conference First Round

2016

Atlanta Hawks 4, Boston Celtics 2

2016 Eastern Conference First Round

==== (3) Philadelphia 76ers vs. (6) Brooklyn Nets ====
ESPN

April 15
1:00 p.m.

Recap

Brooklyn Nets 101, Philadelphia 76ers 121
Scoring by quarter: 25–30, 33–37, 23–26, 20–28
Pts: Mikal Bridges 30; Rebs: Nic Claxton 10; Asts: Spencer Dinwiddie 7	Pts: Joel Embiid 26; Rebs: P. J. Tucker 7 Asts: James Harden 13
Philadelphia leads series, 1–0

Wells Fargo Center, Philadelphia, PA
Attendance: 20,913
Referees: James Williams, Mark Lindsay, JB DeRosa

James Harden led the way for the 76ers with 23 points and 13 assists, including seven three-pointers as Philadelphia moved to 5–0 against the Nets this season. Joel Embiid contributed 26 points for Philadelphia, while Tobias Harris added 21 points. The 76ers also set a team record for playoff three-pointers, with 21 made shots from beyond the arc; with 13 of them coming in the first half. Mikal Bridges had a standout performance for the Nets, making 10-of-16 shots for 23 points in the first half and keeping Brooklyn within nine at halftime, but the Nets never led in the game.

TNT

April 17
7:30 p.m.

Recap

Brooklyn Nets 84, Philadelphia 76ers 96
Scoring by quarter: 25–25, 24–19, 14–24, 21–28
Pts: Cameron Johnson 28; Rebs: Dorian Finney-Smith 7 Asts: Mikal Bridges 7	Pts: Tyrese Maxey 33; Rebs: Joel Embiid 19; Asts: Embiid, Harden 7 each
Philadelphia leads series, 2–0

Wells Fargo Center, Philadelphia, PA
Attendance: 20,958
Referees: David Guthrie, Curtis Blair, Tre Maddox

Being heavily defended throughout the game, Joel Embiid showed increased trust in his teammates as Tyrese Maxey scored 33 points and Tobias Harris had 20 points and 12 rebounds, while Embiid contributed with 19 rebounds, seven assists, and three blocks as Philadelphia took a commanding 2–0 series lead. After a slow start, the 76ers rallied in the second half and held off the Nets, who shot 35% from the field in the second half. Cameron Johnson scored 22 of his 28 points in the first half, but Brooklyn was unable to get anything going in the second half, scoring just 35 points.

TNT

April 20
7:30 p.m.

Recap

Philadelphia 76ers 102, Brooklyn Nets 97
Scoring by quarter: 32–28, 26–19, 18–35, 26–15
Pts: Tyrese Maxey 25; Rebs: Joel Embiid 10; Asts: Harden, Tucker 4 each	Pts: Mikal Bridges 26; Rebs: Dorian Finney-Smith 9 Asts: Spencer Dinwiddie 7
Philadelphia leads series, 3–0

Barclays Center, Brooklyn, NY
Attendance: 17,910
Referees: Tony Brothers, Ben Taylor, Nick Buchert

With James Harden ejected in the third quarter and Joel Embiid struggling offensively, the 76ers rode Tyrese Maxey's team-high 25 points, including ten points in the final three minutes to give Philadelphia a 3–0 series lead. Although Joel Embiid was held to just 14 points on 5-of-13 shooting, he remained dominant on the defensive end and sealed the game by blocking a potential game-tying layup by Spencer Dinwiddie with just under ten seconds left. Mikal Bridges led the Nets with 26 points, but Brooklyn was held to just 15 points in the fourth quarter as the 76ers finished the game on an 11–1 run to hand the Nets their ninth consecutive playoff loss.

TNT

April 22
1:00 p.m.

Recap

Philadelphia 76ers 96, Brooklyn Nets 88
Scoring by quarter: 22–29, 18–19, 26–15, 30–25
Pts: Tobias Harris 25; Rebs: Paul Reed 15; Asts: James Harden 11	Pts: Spencer Dinwiddie 20; Rebs: Nic Claxton 12; Asts: Spencer Dinwiddie 6
Philadelphia wins series, 4–0

Barclays Center, Brooklyn, NY
Attendance: 18,037
Referees: John Goble, Sean Wright, Karl Lane

Without Joel Embiid, Tobias Harris led Philadelphia with 25 points and 12 rebounds, while James Harden contributed 17 points and 11 assists as the 76ers swept a playoff opponent for the first time since 1991. Paul Reed, who replaced Embiid in the starting lineup, contributed ten points and 15 rebounds, while De'Anthony Melton scored all 15 of his points in the fourth quarter. The 76ers' defense also limited the Nets to 40 points in the second half and outscored Brooklyn 21–4 during an eight-minute stretch in the third quarter. Despite Spencer Dinwiddie's 20 points and Nic Claxton's 19 points and 12 rebounds, the Nets lost their tenth consecutive playoff game. Additionally, they went 0–8 against Philadelphia this season.

Regular-season series
Philadelphia won 4–0 in the regular-season series

November 22, 2022

Recap

Brooklyn Nets 106, Philadelphia 76ers 115

Wells Fargo Center, Philadelphia, PA

January 25, 2023

Recap

Brooklyn Nets 133, Philadelphia 76ers 137

Wells Fargo Center, Philadelphia, PA

February 11, 2023

Recap

Philadelphia 76ers 101, Brooklyn Nets 98

Barclays Center, Brooklyn, NY

April 9, 2023

Recap

Philadelphia 76ers 134, Brooklyn Nets 105

Barclays Center, Brooklyn, NY

This was the fourth playoff meeting between these two teams, and the second since the New Jersey Nets relocated to Brooklyn in 2012, with the 76ers winning two of the first three meetings.

Previous playoff series
Philadelphia leads 2–1 in all-time playoff series

1979

Philadelphia 76ers 2, New Jersey Nets 0

1979 Eastern Conference First Round

1984

Philadelphia 76ers 2, New Jersey Nets 3

1984 Eastern Conference First Round

2019

Philadelphia 76ers 4, Brooklyn Nets 1

2019 Eastern Conference First Round

==== (4) Cleveland Cavaliers vs. (5) New York Knicks ====
ESPN

April 15
6:00 p.m.

Recap

New York Knicks 101, Cleveland Cavaliers 97
Scoring by quarter: 30–24, 20–21, 28–25, 23–27
Pts: Jalen Brunson 27; Rebs: Hart, Randle 10 each Asts: RJ Barrett 6	Pts: Donovan Mitchell 38; Rebs: Jarrett Allen 14; Asts: Donovan Mitchell 8
New York leads series, 1–0

Rocket Mortgage FieldHouse, Cleveland, OH
Attendance: 19,432
Referees: Zach Zarba, Curtis Blair, Sean Corbin

With the help of 27 points from Jalen Brunson, the Knicks stunned the Cavaliers in Cleveland. Julius Randle and Josh Hart each had ten rebounds, in addition to scoring 19 and 17 points, respectively. Donovan Mitchell led the way for Cleveland in the losing effort, logging 38 points, eight assists, and five rebounds in 44 minutes. Jarrett Allen finished with 14 points and 14 rebounds, and Darius Garland scored 17 points. Cleveland rallied from ten points behind early in the fourth quarter to lead by one with a little over two minutes left in the game, but the Knicks regained the lead on a three-pointer by Hart and an offensive rebound by Randle sealed the win for New York.

TNT

April 18
7:30 p.m.

Recap

New York Knicks 90, Cleveland Cavaliers 107
Scoring by quarter: 22–25, 17–34, 21–23, 30–25
Pts: Julius Randle 22; Rebs: Julius Randle 8 Asts: Jalen Brunson 6	Pts: Darius Garland 32; Rebs: Evan Mobley 13; Asts: Donovan Mitchell 13
Series tied, 1–1

Rocket Mortgage FieldHouse, Cleveland, OH
Attendance: 19,432
Referees: Tony Brothers, Ben Taylor, Brent Barnaky

After a lackluster playoff debut, Darius Garland bounced back with a dominant performance, scoring 26 of his 32 points in the first half to lead the Cavaliers to their first playoff victory without LeBron James on their roster since 1998. Caris LeVert scored 24 points off the bench for Cleveland and Donovan Mitchell added 17 points and a playoff career-high 13 assists. Cleveland capitalized on New York's mistakes, scoring 27 points off of 14 turnovers in the first half, the most by a team in a half since 2009. Although Julius Randle led the Knicks with 22 points, the team's starters shot just 33.3% from the field, making only 18 of their 54 attempted shots.

ABC

April 21
8:30 p.m.

Recap

Cleveland Cavaliers 79, New York Knicks 99
Scoring by quarter: 17–17, 15–28, 23–27, 24–27
Pts: Donovan Mitchell 22; Rebs: Evan Mobley 10; Asts: Donovan Mitchell 5	Pts: Jalen Brunson 21; Rebs: Barrett, Randle 8 each Asts: Jalen Brunson 6
New York leads series, 2–1

Madison Square Garden, New York, NY
Attendance: 19,812
Referees: Josh Tiven, Courtney Kirkland, Justin Van Duyne

In the Knicks' first sold-out home playoff game since 2013, they limited the Cavaliers to 79 points, the lowest point total by any team in a game this season. Jalen Brunson scored a team-high 21 points, while Josh Hart added 13 points off the bench. RJ Barrett, who was 6-of-25 in the first two games, shot 8-of-12 from the field and scored 14 of his 19 points in the first half. For Cleveland, Donovan Mitchell scored 22 points, but Darius Garland, who scored 32 points in Game 2, managed just ten points on 4-of-21 shooting. The Cavaliers struggled mightily with their offense, shooting 7-of-33 from beyond the arc, committing 20 turnovers, and scoring just 32 points in the first half.

ABC

April 23
1:00 p.m.

Recap

Cleveland Cavaliers 93, New York Knicks 102
Scoring by quarter: 23–30, 22–24, 26–19, 22–29
Pts: Darius Garland 23; Rebs: Caris LeVert 9 Asts: Darius Garland 10	Pts: Jalen Brunson 29; Rebs: Mitchell Robinson 11; Asts: Jalen Brunson 6
New York leads series, 3–1

Madison Square Garden, New York, NY
Attendance: 19,812
Referees: Scott Foster, Tre Maddox, Kevin Cutler

In a pivotal Game 4, Jalen Brunson led the way for the Knicks with 29 points, while RJ Barrett contributed 26 points and Josh Hart added 19 points and seven rebounds as the Knicks took a 3–1 series lead over the Cavaliers. Although Darius Garland rebounded with 23 points and ten assists after a poor showing in Game 3, Donovan Mitchell struggled mightily, finishing with just 11 points and six turnovers on 5-of-18 shooting, as he made just one field goal in the second half. Caris LeVert and Jarrett Allen each scored 14 points, but Allen was outrebounded by the Knicks' Mitchell Robinson, who finished with a double-double of 12 points and 11 rebounds as New York held Cleveland to under 100 points for the third time this series.

NBA TV

April 26
7:00 p.m.

Recap

New York Knicks 106, Cleveland Cavaliers 95
Scoring by quarter: 33–26, 28–25, 26–24, 19–20
Pts: Jalen Brunson 23; Rebs: Mitchell Robinson 18; Asts: Julius Randle 6	Pts: Donovan Mitchell 28; Rebs: Evan Mobley 9 Asts: Donovan Mitchell 5
New York wins series, 4–1

Rocket Mortgage FieldHouse, Cleveland, OH
Attendance: 19,432
Referees: John Goble, Kevin Scott, Mitchell Ervin

For the fourth time in five games, New York held Cleveland to under 100 points as the Knicks won a playoff series for just the second time in 23 years. The Knicks were once again led by Jalen Brunson, who scored 23 points, and RJ Barrett, who added 21. Brunson was consistent throughout the series for New York, averaging 24 points in the series and leading the team in scoring in all four wins. Mitchell Robinson anchored the Knicks' defense with 18 rebounds (11 of them offensive) as he outrebounded Cleveland's Jarrett Allen and Evan Mobley for the second straight game. Although Donovan Mitchell and Darius Garland both scored 20-plus points in the same game for the first time this series, the Cavaliers were never able to gain a lead.

Regular-season series
New York won 3–1 in the regular-season series

October 30, 2022

Recap

New York Knicks 108, Cleveland Cavaliers 121

Rocket Mortgage FieldHouse, Cleveland, OH

December 4, 2022

Recap

Cleveland Cavaliers 81, New York Knicks 92

Madison Square Garden, New York City, NY

January 24, 2023

Recap

Cleveland Cavaliers 103, New York Knicks 105

Madison Square Garden, New York City, NY

March 31, 2023

Recap

New York Knicks 130, Cleveland Cavaliers 116

Rocket Mortgage FieldHouse, Cleveland, OH

This was the fourth playoff meeting between these two teams, with the Knicks winning the first three meetings.

Previous playoff series
New York leads 3–0 in all-time playoff series

1978

Cleveland Cavaliers 0, New York Knicks 2

1978 Eastern Conference First Round

1995

New York Knicks 3, Cleveland Cavaliers 1

1995 Eastern Conference First Round

1996

Cleveland Cavaliers 0, New York Knicks 3

1996 Eastern Conference First Round

=== Western Conference first round ===
==== (1) Denver Nuggets vs. (8) Minnesota Timberwolves ====
TNT

April 16
10:30 p.m. (8:30 p.m. MDT)

Recap

Minnesota Timberwolves 80, Denver Nuggets 109
Scoring by quarter: 23–26, 21–29, 14–32, 22–22
Pts: Anthony Edwards 18; Rebs: Rudy Gobert 13; Asts: Anthony Edwards 5	Pts: Jamal Murray 24; Rebs: Nikola Jokić 14; Asts: Jamal Murray 8
Denver leads series, 1–0

Ball Arena, Denver, CO
Attendance: 19,628
Referees: Josh Tiven, Pat Fraher, Rodney Mott

The Nuggets thrashed the Timberwolves in the opening game of the series, holding Minnesota to 30-of-81 field goal shooting and 11-of-36 from beyond the arc. In his first playoff game since the 2020 NBA Bubble, Jamal Murray led the scoring for Denver, scoring 24 points. Nikola Jokić and Michael Porter Jr. both achieved double-doubles, the former having 13 points and 14 rebounds, while the latter finished with 18 points and grabbed 11 boards. Anthony Edwards scored 18 points in the losing effort, while Karl-Anthony Towns had 11 points and ten rebounds. Minnesota's 80 points were their lowest in a game since 2016 and tied for the fewest points scored by any team this season.

TNT

April 19
10:00 p.m. (8:00 p.m. MDT)

Recap

Minnesota Timberwolves 113, Denver Nuggets 122
Scoring by quarter: 22–31, 27–33, 40–23, 24–35
Pts: Anthony Edwards 41; Rebs: Karl-Anthony Towns 12; Asts: Mike Conley 7	Pts: Jamal Murray 40; Rebs: Aaron Gordon 10; Asts: Nikola Jokić 9
Denver leads series, 2–0

Ball Arena, Denver, CO
Attendance: 19,683
Referees: Marc Davis, Ed Malloy, Tyler Ford

Jamal Murray scored 40 points and Michael Porter Jr. had 13 of his 16 in the fourth quarter, powering the Nuggets past the Timberwolves to seize a 2–0 series lead. Nikola Jokić had another strong performance for the Nuggets, finishing with 27 points, nine assists, and nine rebounds as Denver built a 21-point lead in the first half. For Minnesota, Anthony Edwards scored a playoff career-high 41 points as the Wolves shot 17-of-21 (81%) in the third quarter to send Denver trailing entering the final quarter. However, the Nuggets regained their lead thanks to Porter Jr. scoring eight straight points to begin the fourth and a three-pointer with 6:25 left that permanently gave Denver the lead.

ESPN

April 21
9:30 p.m. (8:30 p.m. CDT)

Recap

Denver Nuggets 120, Minnesota Timberwolves 111
Scoring by quarter: 28–28, 33–27, 33–33, 26–23
Pts: Michael Porter Jr. 25; Rebs: Nikola Jokić 11; Asts: Nikola Jokić 12	Pts: Anthony Edwards 36; Rebs: Rudy Gobert 10; Asts: Kyle Anderson 6
Denver leads series, 3–0

Target Center, Minneapolis, MN
Attendance: 19,536
Referees: Zach Zarba, James Williams, Eric Dalen

The Nuggets delivered a disciplined performance to take a commanding 3–0 series lead, with two-time reigning MVP Nikola Jokić leading the team with his seventh career triple-double in the playoffs. Michael Porter Jr. added a team-high 25 points and nine rebounds, while Jamal Murray contributed 18 points and nine assists. Despite another impressive performance by Anthony Edwards, who scored 36 points, the Timberwolves struggled to keep up, as Denver had two 9–0 runs in the first half and started the second quarter by making 12 of their first 16 shots on their way to a 13-point lead. The Wolves' Karl-Anthony Towns had 27 points, while Rudy Gobert had 18 points and ten rebounds.

TNT

April 23
9:30 p.m. (8:30 p.m. CDT)

Recap

Denver Nuggets 108, Minnesota Timberwolves 114 (OT)
Scoring by quarter: 22–23, 30–25, 22–32, 22–16, Overtime: 12–18
Pts: Nikola Jokić 43; Rebs: Nikola Jokić 11; Asts: Nikola Jokić 6	Pts: Anthony Edwards 34; Rebs: Rudy Gobert 15; Asts: Mike Conley 8
Denver leads series, 3–1

Target Center, Minneapolis, MN
Attendance: 18,978
Referees: David Guthrie, Bill Kennedy, Ray Acosta

Down by 12 with under three minutes left in the fourth quarter, Denver went on a 12–0 run to tie it at 96–96, but the Timberwolves ultimately prevented a series sweep in overtime. Anthony Edwards again led the Timberwolves in scoring, logging 34 points in addition to six rebounds and five assists. Nikola Jokić scored 43 points, tying his playoff career-high, on 15-of-26 shooting, while also having 11 rebounds and six assists. Mike Conley contributed 19 points, Karl-Anthony Towns had 17 points and 11 rebounds, and Rudy Gobert produced 14 points and 15 rebounds in the victory. Jamal Murray scored 19, while Michael Porter Jr. had 15 points in the losing effort.

NBA TV

April 25
9:00 p.m. (7:00 p.m. MDT)

Recap

Minnesota Timberwolves 109, Denver Nuggets 112
Scoring by quarter: 29–22, 18–26, 30–29, 32–35
Pts: Anthony Edwards 29; Rebs: Rudy Gobert 15; Asts: Mike Conley 9	Pts: Jamal Murray 35; Rebs: Nikola Jokić 17; Asts: Nikola Jokić 12
Denver wins series, 4–1

Ball Arena, Denver, CO
Attendance: 19,691
Referees: Scott Foster, Curtis Blair, Brian Forte

After a sluggish start, Denver managed to rally and secure their fourth Western Semifinals appearance in five years behind the performances of Nikola Jokić and Jamal Murray. Down by 15 in the first half, the Nuggets came crawling back, as neither team led by more than six after the Nuggets made it 34–28 with 7:15 left in the second quarter. Jokić notched his second triple-double of the series, scoring 28 points despite missing 21-of-29 shots, while Murray scored a game-high 35 points. Anthony Edwards led the Wolves with 29 points, but missed a potential game-tying three-pointer as time expired. Karl-Anthony Towns and Rudy Gobert scored 26 and 16 points, respectively, but both centers fouled out in the fourth quarter.

Regular-season series
Tied 2–2 in the regular-season series

January 2, 2023

Recap

Denver Nuggets 111, Minnesota Timberwolves 124

Target Center, Minneapolis, MN

January 18, 2023

Recap

Minnesota Timberwolves 118, Denver Nuggets 122

Ball Arena, Denver, CO

February 5, 2023

Recap

Denver Nuggets 98, Minnesota Timberwolves 128

Target Center, Minneapolis, MN

February 7, 2023

Recap

Minnesota Timberwolves 112, Denver Nuggets 146

Ball Arena, Denver, CO

This was the second playoff meeting between these two teams, with the Timberwolves winning the first meeting.

Previous playoff series
Minnesota leads 1–0 in all-time playoff series

2004

Minnesota Timberwolves 4, Denver Nuggets 1

2004 Western Conference First Round

==== (2) Memphis Grizzlies vs. (7) Los Angeles Lakers ====
ABC

April 16
3:00 p.m. (2:00 p.m. CDT)

Recap

Los Angeles Lakers 128, Memphis Grizzlies 112
Scoring by quarter: 32–27, 27–38, 37–25, 32–22
Pts: Rui Hachimura 29; Rebs: Anthony Davis 12; Asts: D'Angelo Russell 7	Pts: Jaren Jackson Jr. 31; Rebs: Aldama, Morant 6 each Asts: Desmond Bane 6
LA Lakers lead series, 1–0

FedExForum, Memphis, TN
Attendance: 18,487
Referees: Scott Foster, Eric Lewis, Aaron Smith

The Lakers finished the game on a 15–0 run to seal a Game 1 victory in Memphis. Led by Rui Hachimura and Austin Reaves, the duo combined for 37 of the Lakers' 69 points in the second half, including nine straight points from Reaves in the closing minutes to put the game away. LeBron James contributed 21 points and 11 rebounds, while Anthony Davis added 22 points and seven blocks. Jaren Jackson Jr. led the Grizzlies with 31 points, and Desmond Bane scored 22. Ja Morant had 18 points but left the game in the fourth quarter with an injured right hand.

TNT

April 19
7:30 p.m. (6:30 p.m. CDT)

Recap

Los Angeles Lakers 93, Memphis Grizzlies 103
Scoring by quarter: 19–30, 25–29, 27–24, 22–20
Pts: LeBron James 28; Rebs: LeBron James 12; Asts: Reaves, Russell 4 each	Pts: Xavier Tillman 22; Rebs: Xavier Tillman 13; Asts: Tyus Jones 8
Series tied, 1–1

FedExForum, Memphis, TN
Attendance: 17,928
Referees: Josh Tiven, Courtney Kirkland, Justin Van Duyne

In danger of falling behind 2–0 in the series and without their All-Star Ja Morant, Xavier Tillman stepped up for Memphis, scoring a career-high 22 points and a season-high 13 rebounds. Newly named Defensive Player of the Year Jaren Jackson Jr. added 18 points and three blocks, while Desmond Bane and Tyus Jones had 17 and ten points, respectively. LeBron James led the Lakers with 28 points and 12 rebounds, and Rui Hachimura dropped 20 points off the bench, but starters Anthony Davis and D'Angelo Russell struggled, combining for just 18 points on a combined 6-of-25 from the field.

ESPN

April 22
10:00 p.m. (7:00 p.m. PDT)

Recap

Memphis Grizzlies 101, Los Angeles Lakers 111
Scoring by quarter: 9–35, 28–18, 31–35, 33–23
Pts: Ja Morant 45; Rebs: Xavier Tillman 12; Asts: Ja Morant 13	Pts: Anthony Davis 31; Rebs: Anthony Davis 17; Asts: D'Angelo Russell 7
LA Lakers lead series, 2–1

Crypto.com Arena, Los Angeles, CA
Attendance: 18,997
Referees: Marc Davis, Ed Malloy, Brian Forte

In their first sold-out playoff home game since 2013, the Lakers produced one of the greatest first quarters in team history, as they stormed out to a 35–9 lead, tying an NBA record by taking a 26-point lead into the second quarter. Anthony Davis dropped 31 points and 17 rebounds, LeBron James finished with 25 points, and Rui Hachimura scored 16 points off the bench. For Memphis, Dillon Brooks was ejected early in the second half for striking James in the groin. Ja Morant scored 45 points in his return from a one-game absence, scoring 22 consecutive points for Memphis during his 24-point fourth quarter. Morant also had 13 assists and nine rebounds, but Memphis could not fully recover from their slow start.

TNT

April 24
10:00 p.m. (7:00 p.m. PDT)

Recap

Memphis Grizzlies 111, Los Angeles Lakers 117 (OT)
Scoring by quarter: 23–29, 29–25, 31–27, 21–23, Overtime: 7–13
Pts: Desmond Bane 36; Rebs: Jaren Jackson Jr. 14; Asts: Ja Morant 7	Pts: Austin Reaves 23; Rebs: LeBron James 20; Asts: LeBron James 7
LA Lakers lead series, 3–1

Crypto.com Arena, Los Angeles, CA
Attendance: 18,997
Referees: John Goble, Sean Wright, Mitchell Ervin

In his 270th career playoff game, LeBron James made a game-tying layup with less than a second left in regulation and scored four of his 22 points in overtime to help the No. 7-seeded Lakers take a 3–1 series lead. James also grabbed a career-high 20 rebounds for the first 20–20 game of his 20-year career. Austin Reaves scored 23 points and Anthony Davis had five of his 12 points in overtime as Los Angeles surged back from a seven-point deficit with five minutes left in regulation with a rally that began when D'Angelo Russell hit three consecutive three-pointers. The Grizzlies' Desmond Bane scored 36 points, and Ja Morant scored 19 points with an injured right hand, but Davis blocked his jumper at the regulation buzzer.

TNT

April 26
7:30 p.m. (6:30 p.m. CDT)

Recap

Los Angeles Lakers 99, Memphis Grizzlies 116
Scoring by quarter: 24–38, 28–23, 24–33, 23–22
Pts: Anthony Davis 31; Rebs: Anthony Davis 19; Asts: D'Angelo Russell 10	Pts: Desmond Bane 33; Rebs: three players 10 each (Note: Bane, Jackson Jr., and Morant); Asts: Ja Morant 7
LA Lakers lead series, 3–2

FedExForum, Memphis, TN
Attendance: 18,117
Referees: David Guthrie, Bill Kennedy, Nick Buchert

The No. 2 seeded Grizzlies staved off elimination with a collaborative team effort. Desmond Bane had his second-straight 30-point game to go along with ten rebounds, while Ja Morant added 31 points and ten boards, and Jaren Jackson Jr. contributed 18 points and ten rebounds. LeBron James started off 1-of-7 shooting and ultimately finished with 15 points and ten rebounds, while Anthony Davis led the Lakers with 31 points and 19 boards. Although they trailed for most of the game, the Lakers pulled within one point with 4:36 left in the third quarter. However, Memphis responded with a 26–2 run that effectively put the game away. Los Angeles tried to rally with a 20–7 run in the fourth quarter, but could not get closer than 12 points.

ESPN

April 28
10:30 p.m. (7:30 p.m. PDT)

Recap

Memphis Grizzlies 85, Los Angeles Lakers 125
Scoring by quarter: 20–31, 22–28, 25–41, 18–25
Pts: Santi Aldama 16; Rebs: Roddy, Tillman 6 each Asts: Ja Morant 6	Pts: D'Angelo Russell 31; Rebs: Anthony Davis 14; Asts: Austin Reaves 8
LA Lakers win series, 4–2

Crypto.com Arena, Los Angeles, CA
Attendance: 18,997
Referees: Tony Brothers, Kevin Scott, Sean Corbin

Los Angeles dominated throughout the game, building a 20-point lead in the first half and a 36-point lead in the third quarter as the Lakers won a playoff series in their home arena for the first time since 2012. LeBron James led the way with 22 points on 9-of-13 shooting, while Anthony Davis put on a defensive clinic with 16 points, 14 rebounds, and five blocks. D'Angelo Russell had a career playoff-high 31 points, and Austin Reaves contributed 11 points, eight assists, and six rebounds. Ja Morant, who was playing with an injured right hand, struggled mightily, scoring just ten points on 3-of-16 shooting. Dillon Brooks, who gained notoriety throughout the series, scored just ten points and finished the series shooting 31% from the field.

Regular-season series
LA Lakers won 2–1 in the regular-season series

January 20, 2023

Recap

Memphis Grizzlies 121, Los Angeles Lakers 122

Crypto.com Arena, Los Angeles, CA

February 28, 2023

Recap

Los Angeles Lakers 109, Memphis Grizzlies 121

FedExForum, Memphis, TN

March 7, 2023

Recap

Memphis Grizzlies 103, Los Angeles Lakers 112

Crypto.com Arena, Los Angeles, CA

This was the first playoff meeting between these two teams.

==== (3) Sacramento Kings vs. (6) Golden State Warriors ====
ABC

April 15
8:30 p.m. (5:30 p.m. PDT)

Recap

Golden State Warriors 123, Sacramento Kings 126
Scoring by quarter: 29–29, 32–26, 29–36, 33–35
Pts: Stephen Curry 30; Rebs: D. Green, Looney 9 each Asts: Draymond Green 11	Pts: De'Aaron Fox 38; Rebs: Domantas Sabonis 16; Asts: De'Aaron Fox 5
Sacramento leads series, 1–0

Golden 1 Center, Sacramento, CA
Attendance: 18,253
Referees: John Goble, Ed Malloy, Sean Wright

In his playoff debut, De'Aaron Fox finished with 38 points, five assists, and three steals as he led Sacramento to their first playoff win in 17 years. Malik Monk, who was also making his playoff debut, came off the bench and scored 32 points on 8-of-13 shooting and 14-of-14 from the free throw line in 29 minutes of play. Domantas Sabonis, the league leader in double-doubles this season, came up with another, posting 12 points and 16 rebounds. Stephen Curry was the leading scorer for the Warriors in this game, scoring 30 points on 6-of-14 shooting from beyond the arc, but missed the potential game-tying three-pointer in the final seconds. Klay Thompson added 21 points, while Draymond Green had 11 assists and nine rebounds.

TNT

April 17
10:00 p.m. (7:00 p.m. PDT)

Recap

Golden State Warriors 106, Sacramento Kings 114
Scoring by quarter: 23–17, 29–41, 23–25, 31–31
Pts: Stephen Curry 28; Rebs: Kevon Looney 7 Asts: Stephen Curry 6	Pts: Fox, Sabonis 24 each Rebs: Domantas Sabonis 9 Asts: De'Aaron Fox 9
Sacramento leads series, 2–0

Golden 1 Center, Sacramento, CA
Attendance: 18,253
Referees: Zach Zarba, Courtney Kirkland, Gediminas Petraitis

Tied 95–95 late in the fourth quarter, The Kings went on a 17–8 run to become the first team to take a 2–0 series lead over the Warriors under Steve Kerr's tenure. De'Aaron Fox scored 24 points and hit a crucial three-pointer that helped seal the victory for Sacramento. Domantas Sabonis added 24 points, and Malik Monk scored 18 off the bench. Stephen Curry led the Warriors with 28 points, but went 3-for-13 from beyond the arc as the Warriors committed 20 turnovers and 26 personal fouls. The game got heated midway through the fourth quarter, as Draymond Green was ejected for stepping on Sabonis' chest after Sabonis fell down and grabbed Green's leg following a rebound attempt.

TNT

April 20
10:00 p.m. (7:00 p.m. PDT)

Recap

Sacramento Kings 97, Golden State Warriors 114
Scoring by quarter: 20–29, 21–24, 31–31, 25–30
Pts: De'Aaron Fox 26; Rebs: Domantas Sabonis 16; Asts: De'Aaron Fox 9	Pts: Stephen Curry 36; Rebs: Kevon Looney 20; Asts: Kevon Looney 9
Sacramento leads series, 2–1

Chase Center, San Francisco, CA
Attendance: 18,064
Referees: Eric Lewis, Kevin Scott, Sean Corbin

The Warriors entered Game 3 trailing 2–0 and missing two of their top defenders, including Draymond Green, who was suspended as a result of his actions the previous game. The Warriors responded to the challenge by dominating the Kings 114–97, as Sacramento never led in the game. Stephen Curry scored 36 points, Kevon Looney matched his career high with 20 rebounds to go with nine assists, and Andrew Wiggins added 20 points and seven rebounds. The Kings’ De'Aaron Fox scored 26 points, nine rebounds, and nine assists, while Domantas Sabonis added 15 points and 16 rebounds as the Kings missed a season-high 36 three-point attempts.

ABC

April 23
3:30 p.m. (12:30 p.m. PDT)

Recap

Sacramento Kings 125, Golden State Warriors 126
Scoring by quarter: 32–31, 37–34, 23–37, 33–24
Pts: De'Aaron Fox 38; Rebs: De'Aaron Fox 9 Asts: Domantas Sabonis 8	Pts: Stephen Curry 32; Rebs: Kevon Looney 14; Asts: Draymond Green 7
Series tied, 2–2

Chase Center, San Francisco, CA
Attendance: 18,064
Referees: Josh Tiven, James Williams, Pat Fraher

In a collaborative team effort, Stephen Curry scored 32 points, Klay Thompson added 26, and Jordan Poole dropped 22 points as the Warriors tied the series at two games apiece. Draymond Green returned from his one-game suspension and provided 12 points, ten rebounds, and seven assists, while Andrew Wiggins contributed 18 points. Despite the victory, the Warriors made a late blunder when Curry called a timeout that they did not have, giving the Kings a chance to win the game in the final seconds. However, Harrison Barnes missed a three-pointer at the buzzer, allowing the Warriors to hold on for the win. For the Kings, De'Aaron Fox put up 38 points and nine rebounds while Keegan Murray contributed 23 points.

TNT

April 26
10:00 p.m. (7:00 p.m. PDT)

Recap

Golden State Warriors 123, Sacramento Kings 116
Scoring by quarter: 33–36, 27–20, 39–34, 24–26
Pts: Stephen Curry 31; Rebs: Kevon Looney 22; Asts: Stephen Curry 8	Pts: De'Aaron Fox 24; Rebs: Domantas Sabonis 10; Asts: De'Aaron Fox 9
Golden State leads series, 3–2

Golden 1 Center, Sacramento, CA
Attendance: 18,253
Referees: Tony Brothers, Mark Lindsay, Tyler Ford

In spite of their 11–32 record on the road this season, the Warriors came away with a critical Game 5 victory as Golden State won a road game for the NBA-record 28th straight playoff series. Stephen Curry spearheaded the victory with 31 points, while Draymond Green had his highest scoring output since 2018 with 21 points on 8-of-10 shooting. Klay Thompson added 25 points and five three-pointers, Andrew Wiggins had 20 points, and Kevon Looney matched his career-high with 22 rebounds. Despite a broken index finger on his shooting hand, De'Aaron Fox scored 24 points for the Kings, while Malik Monk and Domantas Sabonis added 21 points apiece, but it was not enough to overcome the defending champions.

ESPN

April 28
8:00 p.m. (5:00 p.m. PDT)

Recap

Sacramento Kings 118, Golden State Warriors 99
Scoring by quarter: 23–25, 35–26, 32–29, 28–19
Pts: Malik Monk 28; Rebs: Keegan Murray 12; Asts: De'Aaron Fox 11	Pts: Stephen Curry 29; Rebs: Kevon Looney 13; Asts: Draymond Green 10
Series tied, 3–3

Chase Center, San Francisco, CA
Attendance: 18,064
Referees: David Guthrie, Bill Kennedy, Ben Taylor

The Kings, led by Malik Monk's 28 points, staved off elimination on the road and forced the first Game 7 of the 2023 playoffs. De'Aaron Fox added 26 points and 11 assists, and rookie Keegan Murray scored his first playoff double-double. For Golden State, Stephen Curry scored 29, Klay Thompson had 22, and Kevon Looney pulled down 13 rebounds. However, starters Andrew Wiggins and Jordan Poole combined for just 20 points on 29% shooting (7-of-24). Although Domantas Sabonis fouled out in the fourth quarter, the Kings controlled the game in the second half, never allowing the Warriors to get closer than seven points in the fourth quarter.

ABC

April 30
3:30 p.m. (12:30 p.m. PDT)

Recap

Golden State Warriors 120, Sacramento Kings 100
Scoring by quarter: 30–31, 26–27, 35–23, 29–19
Pts: Stephen Curry 50; Rebs: Kevon Looney 21; Asts: Draymond Green 8	Pts: Domantas Sabonis 22; Rebs: Huerter, Monk 9 each Asts: Domantas Sabonis 7
Golden State wins series, 4–3

Golden 1 Center, Sacramento, CA
Attendance: 18,253
Referees: Scott Foster, Kevin Scott, Curtis Blair

Stephen Curry scored a playoff career-high to help the Warriors advance to the Western Conference semifinals, becoming the first player ever to score 50 points in a game 7. While the rest of his team shot 37% from the field, Curry shot 20-of-38 (53%) with seven three-pointers to go along with eight rebounds and six assists, as no one else for Golden State scored more than 17 points. In addition to Curry's performance, Kevon Looney grabbed 21 rebounds, including ten offensive boards, to mark his third 20-rebound game of the series. For the Kings, Domantas Sabonis had 22 points, eight rebounds, and seven assists, but the Warriors held De'Aaron Fox in check as he scored 16 points on 5-of-19 shooting in his third game with a broken finger. Although they trailed at halftime, the Warriors opened the second half with a 22–8 run and held Sacramento to 42 points on 33% shooting after the break.

Regular-season series
Golden State won 3–1 in the regular-season series

October 23, 2022

Recap

Sacramento Kings 125, Golden State Warriors 130

Chase Center, San Francisco, CA

November 7, 2022

Recap

Sacramento Kings 113, Golden State Warriors 116

Chase Center, San Francisco, CA

November 13, 2022

Recap

Golden State Warriors 115, Sacramento Kings 122

Golden 1 Center, Sacramento, CA

April 7, 2023

Recap

Golden State Warriors 119, Sacramento Kings 97

Golden 1 Center, Sacramento, CA

This was the first playoff meeting between these two teams.

==== (4) Phoenix Suns vs. (5) Los Angeles Clippers ====
TNT

April 16
8:00 p.m. (5:00 p.m. MST)

Recap

Los Angeles Clippers 115, Phoenix Suns 110
Scoring by quarter: 30–18, 29–36, 22–27, 34–29
Pts: Kawhi Leonard 38; Rebs: Ivica Zubac 15; Asts: Russell Westbrook 8	Pts: Kevin Durant 27; Rebs: Chris Paul 11; Asts: Kevin Durant 11
LA Clippers lead series, 1–0

Footprint Center, Phoenix, AZ
Attendance: 17,071
Referees: Marc Davis, Kevin Scott, Brian Forte

In the absence of Paul George, Kawhi Leonard took charge for the Clippers, scoring 38 points and hitting two crucial three-pointers in the closing moments to secure the series opener. Despite a poor shooting performance from Russell Westbrook, who went 3-of-19 from the field, he added 11 rebounds, eight assists, and made two crucial free throws late in the game. He also blocked Devin Booker's layup attempt in the final minute to secure the win. For Phoenix, Kevin Durant scored 27 points to go along with nine rebounds and 11 assists, while Booker contributed 26 points, three blocks, and four steals. Notably, this marked Durant's first loss as a member of the Suns.

TNT

April 18
10:00 p.m. (7:00 p.m. MST)

Recap

Los Angeles Clippers 109, Phoenix Suns 123
Scoring by quarter: 29–24, 30–35, 28–33, 22–31
Pts: Kawhi Leonard 31; Rebs: Kawhi Leonard 8 Asts: Kawhi Leonard 7	Pts: Devin Booker 38; Rebs: Deandre Ayton 13; Asts: Devin Booker 9
Series tied, 1–1

Footprint Center, Phoenix, AZ
Attendance: 17,071
Referees: Scott Foster, Eric Lewis, JB DeRosa

The Suns overcame a slow start and a 13-point deficit midway through the second quarter to even the series at one game apiece. Devin Booker led the Suns with 38 points and nine assists on 14-of-22 shooting, while Kevin Durant added 25 points. Although the Clippers' bench outscored Phoenix's 30–13, The Suns' starters combined for 110 points on 45-of-74 (61%) from the field as Phoenix went on a 23–4 run during the middle two quarters to take control of the game. Kawhi Leonard led Los Angeles with 31 points, while Russell Westbrook added 28 points on an improved 9-of-16 shooting. Notably, Chris Paul had his 13-game playoff losing streak snapped when referee Scott Foster is on the floor.

NBA TV

April 20
10:30 p.m. (7:30 p.m. PDT)

Recap

Phoenix Suns 129, Los Angeles Clippers 124
Scoring by quarter: 27–27, 27–24, 40–34, 35–39
Pts: Devin Booker 45; Rebs: Deandre Ayton 11; Asts: Chris Paul 7	Pts: Norman Powell 42; Rebs: Westbrook, Zubac 8 each Asts: Russell Westbrook 12
Phoenix leads series, 2–1

Crypto.com Arena, Los Angeles, CA
Attendance: 19,068
Referees: David Guthrie, Bill Kennedy, Jacyn Goble

Devin Booker and Kevin Durant combined for 73 points to take a 2–1 series lead. Despite Kawhi Leonard's absence, the Clippers remained competitive in the first half, with neither team leading by more than eight points. The Suns pulled away in the third quarter, with Booker scoring eight points in a 17–8 run to give Phoenix its first double-digit lead of the game. Norman Powell stepped up for Los Angeles, scoring a career playoff-high 42 points on 15-of-23 shooting, while Russell Westbrook dropped 30 points and 12 assists. Bones Hyland (20 points) came off the bench and outscored the Phoenix bench (18 points), but it was not enough to overcome the Suns' starters, as they combined for 110-plus points for the second straight game.

TNT

April 22
3:30 p.m. (12:30 p.m. PDT)

Recap

Phoenix Suns 112, Los Angeles Clippers 100
Scoring by quarter: 23–30, 25–17, 35–31, 29–22
Pts: Kevin Durant 31; Rebs: Deandre Ayton 13; Asts: Chris Paul 9	Pts: Russell Westbrook 37; Rebs: Ivica Zubac 9 Asts: Mann, Westbrook 4 each
Phoenix leads series, 3–1

Crypto.com Arena, Los Angeles, CA
Attendance: 19,068
Referees: Tony Brothers, Curtis Blair, Nick Buchert

Kevin Durant scored 31 points, Devin Booker added 30, and Chris Paul finished with 19 points and nine assists as the Suns won their third straight game against Los Angeles. The Clippers were without Kawhi Leonard and Paul George, but Russell Westbrook carried the team in the fourth quarter, scoring 14 points, including nine in a row when they twice pulled within two points. However, Paul staved off the Clippers in the fourth quarter, scoring 12 points on 5-of-9 shooting against his former team. Westbrook finished with a game-high 37 points, while Norman Powell added 14 points and Terance Mann had 13 off the bench.

TNT

April 25
10:00 p.m. (7:00 p.m. MST)

Recap

Los Angeles Clippers 130, Phoenix Suns 136
Scoring by quarter: 30–32, 40–29, 24–50, 36–25
Pts: Norman Powell 27; Rebs: Plumlee, Zubac 10 each Asts: Russell Westbrook 8	Pts: Devin Booker 47; Rebs: Deandre Ayton 11; Asts: Devin Booker 10
Phoenix wins series, 4–1

Footprint Center, Phoenix, AZ
Attendance: 17,071
Referees: Zach Zarba, Ben Taylor, Karl Lane

Devin Booker led Phoenix past the Clippers with a 47-point performance, including 25 points in the third quarter, to advance to the Western Semifinals for the third straight season. The Clippers attempted to come back from a 20-point deficit in the fourth quarter, hitting four straight three-pointers to quickly close the gap, and had multiple chances to tie the game in the final three minutes but could never convert. Kevin Durant sealed the win for the Suns by making a layup to extend their lead to 134–130, and then made two free throws to put them up six with 31 seconds left. Durant finished with 31 points while Deandre Ayton had 21 points and 11 rebounds. Booker shot 19-of-27 from the field, including 4-of-7 from three-point range.

Regular-season series
Tied 2–2 in the regular-season series

October 23, 2022

Recap

Phoenix Suns 112, Los Angeles Clippers 95

Crypto.com Arena, Los Angeles, CA

December 15, 2022

Recap

Phoenix Suns 111, Los Angeles Clippers 95

Crypto.com Arena, Los Angeles, CA

February 16, 2023

Recap

Los Angeles Clippers 116, Phoenix Suns 107

Footprint Center, Phoenix, AZ

April 9, 2023

Recap

Los Angeles Clippers 119, Phoenix Suns 114

Footprint Center, Phoenix, AZ

This was the third playoff meeting between these two teams, with the Suns winning the first two meetings.

Previous playoff series
Phoenix leads 2–0 in all-time playoff series

2006

Phoenix Suns 4, Los Angeles Clippers 3

2006 Western Conference semifinals

2021

Phoenix Suns 4, Los Angeles Clippers 2

2021 Western Conference finals

== Conference semifinals ==
Note: Times are EDT (UTC−4) as listed by the NBA. If the venue is located in a different time zone, the local time is also given.

=== Eastern Conference semifinals ===
==== (2) Boston Celtics vs. (3) Philadelphia 76ers ====
TNT

May 1
7:30 p.m.

Recap

Philadelphia 76ers 119, Boston Celtics 115
Scoring by quarter: 31–38, 32–28, 24–21, 32–28
Pts: James Harden 45; Rebs: Paul Reed 13; Asts: James Harden 6	Pts: Jayson Tatum 39; Rebs: Jayson Tatum 11; Asts: Marcus Smart 7
Philadelphia leads series, 1–0

TD Garden, Boston, MA
Attendance: 19,156
Referees: David Guthrie, Courtney Kirkland, Karl Lane

Led by James Harden's 45 points, the 76ers rallied without Joel Embiid to beat the Celtics on the road to take a 1–0 series lead. Harden, who tied his playoff career-high, hit a go-ahead, step-back three-pointer over Al Horford with less than ten seconds left to help secure the victory. Tyrese Maxey added 26 points and Tobias Harris finished with 18 for Philadelphia, who made 17 three-pointers in the absence of MVP Embiid. Jayson Tatum led the Celtics with 39 points and 11 rebounds, while Jaylen Brown added 23 points and Malcolm Brogdon finished with 20 points. The Celtics had one final chance and got the ball to Tatum, but he lost the ball to Paul Reed, who later hit a pair of free throws to seal the win for Philadelphia.

TNT

May 3
8:00 p.m.

Recap

Philadelphia 76ers 87, Boston Celtics 121
Scoring by quarter: 22–28, 27–29, 16–35, 22–29
Pts: Tobias Harris 16; Rebs: James Harden 10; Asts: James Harden 4	Pts: Jaylen Brown 25; Rebs: three players 7 each (Note: Horford, Tatum, and Williams III); Asts: three players 4 each (Note: Brown, Williams, and Williams III)
Series tied, 1–1

TD Garden, Boston, MA
Attendance: 19,156
Referees: Zach Zarba, Kevin Scott, Rodney Mott

The Celtics bounced back from their series opening loss to rout the 76ers by 34 points and hand Philadelphia their first loss of the playoffs. Jaylen Brown scored a game-high 25 points, while Malcolm Brogdon added 23 points, connecting on six of Boston's 20 three-pointers. Derrick White and Marcus Smart scored 15 points apiece, while Jayson Tatum struggled with fouls and scored just seven points. The Celtics stepped up their defense and limited the 76ers, who made 17 threes in Game 1, to just 6-of-30 from beyond the arc. Joel Embiid returned from injury to score 15 points and notch five blocks, while James Harden struggled to find his rhythm, shooting just 2-of-14 from the field and missing all six of his three-point attempts.

ESPN

May 5
7:30 p.m.

Recap

Boston Celtics 114, Philadelphia 76ers 102
Scoring by quarter: 28–29, 29–21, 31–27, 26–25
Pts: Jayson Tatum 27; Rebs: Jayson Tatum 10; Asts: Malcolm Brogdon 6	Pts: Joel Embiid 30; Rebs: Joel Embiid 13; Asts: James Harden 11
Boston leads series, 2–1

Wells Fargo Center, Philadelphia, PA
Attendance: 21,290
Referees: Scott Foster, Ben Taylor, Mark Lindsay

With Joel Embiid receiving his MVP trophy in a pregame ceremony in front of his home floor, the duo of Jayson Tatum and Jaylen Brown spoiled the show for Philadelphia, combining for 50 points and giving the Celtics a 2–1 series advantage. Boston led the majority of the game thanks to a 14–4 run to start the game, with six Celtics players scoring in double figures. Although Philadelphia pulled within four points late in the final quarter, Boston hit timely three-pointers that prevented the 76ers from gaining any more ground. Despite Embiid's 30-point and 13-rebound performance on one good knee, James Harden and Tyrese Maxey's combined shooting of 7-for-30 (23%) left him with little offensive support.

ESPN

May 7
3:30 p.m.

Recap

Boston Celtics 115, Philadelphia 76ers 116 (OT)
Scoring by quarter: 19–27, 31–32, 33–33, 24–15, Overtime: 8–9
Pts: Jayson Tatum 24; Rebs: Jayson Tatum 18; Asts: Marcus Smart 7	Pts: James Harden 42; Rebs: Joel Embiid 13; Asts: James Harden 9
Series tied, 2–2

Wells Fargo Center, Philadelphia, PA
Attendance: 21,264
Referees: John Goble, James Williams, Gediminas Petraitis

After having the worst shooting stretch of his career over any two-game span in Games 2 and 3, James Harden bounced back in Game 4 by scoring 42 points on 16-of-23 shooting to help Philadelphia tie the series at two games apiece. After Boston rallied from a 16-point deficit to take a five-point lead with two minutes left in the fourth quarter, the 76ers responded with key baskets from Harden and P. J. Tucker, including a floater from Harden with 16 seconds left to force overtime. In overtime, Joel Embiid hit a pair of free-throws to give Philadelphia the lead, but Jayson Tatum hit a step-back three to put the Celtics ahead by two with less than a minute remaining. However, Harden answered back with his sixth three-pointer of the night, putting the 76ers back in front with 18 seconds to go. Although Marcus Smart had a chance to win it for Boston, his shot was ruled too late, securing the victory for Philadelphia.

TNT

May 9
7:30 p.m.

Recap

Philadelphia 76ers 115, Boston Celtics 103
Scoring by quarter: 33–26, 25–23, 30–23, 27–31
Pts: Joel Embiid 33; Rebs: Tobias Harris 11; Asts: James Harden 10	Pts: Jayson Tatum 36; Rebs: Jayson Tatum 10; Asts: Jayson Tatum 5
Philadelphia leads series, 3–2

TD Garden, Boston, MA
Attendance: 19,156
Referees: Marc Davis, Josh Tiven, Tyler Ford

With a commanding performance on the road, the 76ers moved to the brink of their first conference finals berth in 22 years. Joel Embiid recorded 33 points, seven rebounds, and four blocks as Philadelphia built an early 42–27 lead and never looked back, leading by as much as 21 points. Tyrese Maxey also stepped up for the 76ers, contributing 30 points and six three-pointers, while James Harden had 17 points, ten assists, and eight rebounds on 50% shooting. Jayson Tatum scored 36 points for Boston, but he struggled to shoot efficiently, going 11-of-27 from the field. Jaylen Brown contributed 24 points, but the Celtics struggled to find their shot throughout the game, shooting just 40% from the field and 31% from beyond the arc.

ESPN

May 11
7:30 p.m.

Recap

Boston Celtics 95, Philadelphia 76ers 86
Scoring by quarter: 29–22, 21–21, 21–30, 24–13
Pts: Marcus Smart 22; Rebs: Al Horford 11; Asts: Marcus Smart 7	Pts: Embiid, Maxey 26 each Rebs: Joel Embiid 10; Asts: James Harden 9
Series tied, 3–3

Wells Fargo Center, Philadelphia, PA
Attendance: 21,337
Referees: David Guthrie, Ed Malloy, Curtis Blair

Jayson Tatum struggled mightily in the first three quarters, scoring just three points on 1-of-13 shooting. However, he came alive during the final quarter, dropping 16 points and leading a crucial 14–1 run in the final five minutes to force a Game 7 back in Boston. Despite trailing by as much as 16 points in the first half, the 76ers rallied thanks to the efforts of Joel Embiid and Tyrese Maxey, who helped the team take the lead entering the fourth quarter. However, Philadelphia faltered down the stretch, missing all eight of their three-point attempts in the fourth and failing to make a single field goal over the last six minutes until garbage time. Embiid and Maxey scored 26 points each, while James Harden shot a poor 4-of-16 from the field.

ABC

May 14
3:30 p.m.

Recap

Philadelphia 76ers 88, Boston Celtics 112
Scoring by quarter: 29–23, 23–32, 10–33, 26–24
Pts: Tobias Harris 19; Rebs: Joel Embiid 8 Asts: James Harden 7	Pts: Jayson Tatum 51; Rebs: Jayson Tatum 13; Asts: Jayson Tatum 5
Boston wins series, 4–3

TD Garden, Boston, MA
Attendance: 19,156
Referees: Scott Foster, Eric Lewis, Bill Kennedy

In a historic performance, Jayson Tatum scored a playoff career-high 51 points, setting a new record for the most points ever scored in a game 7 as he led the Celtics to their fifth conference finals appearance in seven years. Tatum started off strong, scoring 25 points in a competitive first half and adding 17 more in Boston's 33–10 third quarter, which turned a three-point lead into a blowout victory. Tatum also finished with 13 rebounds, five assists, and zero turnovers, setting a playoff record for most points in a game with zero turnovers. Meanwhile, the 76ers lost in the conference semifinals for the fifth time in six years, with MVP Joel Embiid scoring just 15 points on 5-for-18 shooting, while James Harden scored nine points on 3-of-11 shooting. Additionally, 76ers head coach Doc Rivers has now lost a record 10 game sevens, with his teams going 4–13 in their last 17 chances to close out a playoff series.

- This marked the last playoff series between Boston & Philadelphia until 2026.

Regular-season series
Boston won 3–1 in the regular-season series

October 18, 2022

Recap

Philadelphia 76ers 117, Boston Celtics 126

TD Garden, Boston, MA

February 8, 2023

Recap

Philadelphia 76ers 99, Boston Celtics 106

TD Garden, Boston, MA

February 25, 2023

Recap

Boston Celtics 110, Philadelphia 76ers 107

Wells Fargo Center, Philadelphia, PA

April 4, 2023

Recap

Boston Celtics 101, Philadelphia 76ers 103

Wells Fargo Center, Philadelphia, PA

This was the 23rd playoff meeting between these two teams, and the 15th since the Syracuse Nationals relocated to Philadelphia in 1963, with the Celtics winning 14 of the first 22 meetings.

Previous playoffs series
Boston leads 14–8 in all-time playoff series

1953

Syracuse Nationals 0, Boston Celtics 2

1953 Eastern Division semifinals

1954

Boston Celtics 0, Syracuse Nationals 2

1954 Eastern Division Round Robin Semifinals

1954

Syracuse Nationals 2, Boston Celtics 0

1954 Eastern Division finals

1955

Syracuse Nationals 3, Boston Celtics 1

1955 Eastern Division finals

1956

Boston Celtics 1, Syracuse Nationals 2

1956 Eastern Division semifinals

1957

Boston Celtics 3, Syracuse Nationals 0

1957 Eastern Division finals

1959

Boston Celtics 4, Syracuse Nationals 3

1959 Eastern Division finals

1961

Boston Celtics 4, Syracuse Nationals 1

1961 Eastern Division finals

1965

Boston Celtics 4, Philadelphia 76ers 3

1965 Eastern Division finals

1966

Philadelphia 76ers 1, Boston Celtics 4

1966 Eastern Division finals

1967

Philadelphia 76ers 4, Boston Celtics 1

1967 Eastern Division finals

1968

Philadelphia 76ers 3, Boston Celtics 4

1968 Eastern Division finals

1969

Philadelphia 76ers 1, Boston Celtics 4

1969 Eastern Division semifinals

1977

Philadelphia 76ers 4, Boston Celtics 3

1977 Eastern Conference semifinals

1980

Boston Celtics 1, Philadelphia 76ers 4

1980 Eastern Conference finals

1981

Boston Celtics 4, Philadelphia 76ers 3

1981 Eastern Conference finals

1982

Boston Celtics 3, Philadelphia 76ers 4

1982 Eastern Conference finals

1985

Boston Celtics 4, Philadelphia 76ers 1

1985 Eastern Conference finals

2002

Boston Celtics 3, Philadelphia 76ers 2

2002 Eastern Conference First Round

2012

Boston Celtics 4, Philadelphia 76ers 3

2012 Eastern Conference semifinals

2018

Boston Celtics 4, Philadelphia 76ers 1

2018 Eastern Conference semifinals

2020

Boston Celtics 4, Philadelphia 76ers 0

2020 Eastern Conference First Round

==== (5) New York Knicks vs. (8) Miami Heat ====
ABC

April 30
1:00 p.m.

Recap

Miami Heat 108, New York Knicks 101
Scoring by quarter: 21–32, 29–23, 31–20, 27–26
Pts: Jimmy Butler 25; Rebs: Jimmy Butler 11; Asts: Kyle Lowry 6	Pts: RJ Barrett 26; Rebs: Mitchell Robinson 14; Asts: Barrett, Brunson 7 each
Miami leads series, 1–0

Madison Square Garden, New York, NY
Attendance: 19,812
Referees: Tony Brothers, Bill Kennedy, Tyler Ford

After the Knicks led the majority of the first half, the Heat pulled away in the third quarter with a 21–5 run highlighted by a Kevin Love three-pointer that gave Miami a lead they would not relinquish. Jimmy Butler led the way for the Heat with 25 points and 11 rebounds before rolling his ankle in the fourth quarter. Butler got help from his teammates, however, as Gabe Vincent, Kyle Lowry, and Bam Adebayo each scored 15-plus points as all three players made key plays down the stretch. The Heat's defense also held firm, as they limited New York to just 7-of-34 shooting from beyond the arc. The Knicks, who were without Julius Randle, were led by RJ Barrett and Jalen Brunson who scored 26 and 25 points, respectively.

TNT

May 2
7:30 p.m.

Recap

Miami Heat 105, New York Knicks 111
Scoring by quarter: 29–31, 25–20, 23–25, 28–35
Pts: Caleb Martin 22; Rebs: Adebayo, Martin 8 each Asts: Adebayo, Lowry 6 each	Pts: Jalen Brunson 30; Rebs: Julius Randle 12; Asts: Josh Hart 9
Series tied, 1–1

Madison Square Garden, New York, NY
Attendance: 19,812
Referees: Scott Foster, Curtis Blair, Mark Lindsay

After shooting 20% from deep in the series opener, New York bounced back, converting 40% of their three-point attempts as the Knicks evened up the series at one game apiece. Jalen Brunson atoned for his 0-for-7 three-point shooting in Game 1, as he shot 6-of-10 from beyond the arc, finishing with 30 points. Josh Hart finished an assist shy of a triple-double, as he scored ten of his 14 points in the final five minutes of the game. Julius Randle returned to the Knicks lineup and contributed 25 points and 12 rebounds, while RJ Barrett added 24 points. For the Heat, Caleb Martin stepped up in place of the injured Jimmy Butler, scoring 22 points, while Gabe Vincent and Max Strus combined for 38 points, all of whom were undrafted.

ABC

May 6
3:30 p.m.

Recap

New York Knicks 86, Miami Heat 105
Scoring by quarter: 21–29, 23–29, 26–29, 16–18
Pts: Jalen Brunson 20; Rebs: Julius Randle 14; Asts: Jalen Brunson 8	Pts: Jimmy Butler 28; Rebs: Bam Adebayo 12; Asts: three players 4 each (Note: Love, Lowry, and Vincent)
Miami leads series, 2–1

Kaseya Center, Miami, FL
Attendance: 19,927
Referees: Marc Davis, Josh Tiven, Brian Forte

The Heat improved to 3–0 at home this postseason, putting them just two wins away from becoming the second eighth seed ever to advance to the conference finals. Miami started the game by setting the tone on both ends of the court, as they made ten of their first 15 shots, while the Knicks missed 13 of their first 17. Jimmy Butler, who returned from his one-game absence, scored 28 points, Max Strus added 19 points, and Bam Adebayo had a double-double for the Heat, who never trailed. Meanwhile, New York struggled to find their rhythm, as their top three scorers from the regular season (Jalen Brunson, Julius Randle, and RJ Barrett) shot a combined 16-of-51 (31%) from the field, including 2-of-17 (12%) from beyond the arc.

TNT

May 8
7:30 p.m.

Recap

New York Knicks 101, Miami Heat 109
Scoring by quarter: 30–31, 18–25, 33–34, 20–19
Pts: Jalen Brunson 32; Rebs: Julius Randle 9 Asts: Jalen Brunson 11	Pts: Jimmy Butler 27; Rebs: Bam Adebayo 13; Asts: Jimmy Butler 10
Miami leads series, 3–1

Kaseya Center, Miami, FL
Attendance: 19,769
Referees: Zach Zarba, Courtney Kirkland, Ben Taylor

Led by Jimmy Butler and Bam Adebayo, the Heat moved one win away from their third trip to the conference finals in four years. Butler finished with 27 points and ten assists, while Adebayo contributed 23 points and 13 rebounds as Miami became the fourth No. 8 seed to win at least seven playoff games. Although the Heat struggled in the fourth quarter, as they missed 12 of their first 15 shots, the Knicks failed to take full advantage. After New York gave up six offensive rebounds in the first three quarters, they gave up seven more in the fourth quarter alone. Jalen Brunson led the Knicks with 32 points and 11 assists, while RJ Barrett had 24 points and Julius Randle scored 20 before fouling out in the final minutes.

TNT

May 10
7:30 p.m.

Recap

Miami Heat 103, New York Knicks 112
Scoring by quarter: 24–14, 23–36, 27–34, 29–28
Pts: Jimmy Butler 19; Rebs: Bam Adebayo 8 Asts: Jimmy Butler 9	Pts: Jalen Brunson 38; Rebs: Mitchell Robinson 11; Asts: Jalen Brunson 7
Miami leads series, 3–2

Madison Square Garden, New York, NY
Attendance: 19,812
Referees: John Goble, Eric Lewis, Karl Lane

Jalen Brunson played all 48 minutes and contributed 38 points, nine rebounds, and seven assists to help keep the Knicks' season alive. RJ Barrett scored 26 points, while Julius Randle added 24 as the trio combined for 88 of New York's 112 points. Although the Knicks built a 19-point lead in the third quarter, the Heat cut it down to two with under three minutes remaining in the game. However, New York closed the game out on a 9–2 run to force a Game 6 in Miami. Jimmy Butler led the Heat with 19 points, as he was held below 25 points for the first time this postseason. Bam Adebayo and Duncan Robinson also contributed with 18 and 17 points respectively, but Miami struggled from deep, missing 21 of their first 25 three-pointers.

ESPN

May 12
7:30 p.m.

Recap

New York Knicks 92, Miami Heat 96
Scoring by quarter: 31–24, 19–27, 21–23, 21–22
Pts: Jalen Brunson 41; Rebs: Randle, Robinson 11 each Asts: three players 3 each (Note: Brunson, Grimes, and Randle)	Pts: Jimmy Butler 24; Rebs: Bam Adebayo 9 Asts: Kyle Lowry 9
Miami wins series, 4–2

Kaseya Center, Miami, FL
Attendance: 19,737
Referees: Scott Foster, Kevin Scott, Tre Maddox

The Heat advanced to the conference finals for the seventh time in the last 13 seasons and became just the second No. 8 seed ever to reach the conference finals. Despite an early 14-point lead by the Knicks, Miami took the lead by halftime and held it throughout the second half. However, up by six with under a minute remaining, Gabe Vincent's flagrant foul on Jalen Brunson allowed New York to score four points in five seconds. After a Jimmy Butler miss, the Knicks had an opportunity to tie the game, but Kyle Lowry came up with a steal, and Butler made free throws with 14 seconds left to clinch the win for the Heat. Butler scored 24 points, Bam Adebayo added 23, and Lowry had nine assists. Meanwhile, Brunson scored 41 points, accounting for over half of the Knicks' 27 made field goals. But his teammates only scored 51 points, with Julius Randle and RJ Barrett combining for just 26 points on 4-of-24 shooting.

Regular-season series
New York won 3–1 in the regular-season series

February 2, 2023

Recap

Miami Heat 104, New York Knicks 106

Madison Square Garden, New York City, NY

March 3, 2023

Recap

New York Knicks 122, Miami Heat 120

Miami-Dade Arena, Miami, FL

March 22, 2023

Recap

New York Knicks 120, Miami Heat 127

Miami-Dade Arena, Miami, FL

March 29, 2023

Recap

Miami Heat 92, New York Knicks 101

Madison Square Garden, New York City, NY

This was the sixth playoff meeting between these two teams, with the Knicks winning three of the first five meetings.

Previous playoff series
New York leads 3–2 in all-time playoff series

1997

Miami Heat 4, New York Knicks 3

1997 Eastern Conference semifinals

1998

Miami Heat 2, New York Knicks 3

1998 Eastern Conference First Round

1999

Miami Heat 2, New York Knicks 3

1999 Eastern Conference First Round

2000

Miami Heat 3, New York Knicks 4

2000 Eastern Conference semifinals

2012

Miami Heat 4, New York Knicks 1

2012 Eastern Conference First Round

=== Western Conference semifinals ===
==== (1) Denver Nuggets vs. (4) Phoenix Suns ====
TNT

April 29
8:30 p.m. (6:30 p.m. MDT)

Recap

Phoenix Suns 107, Denver Nuggets 125
Scoring by quarter: 32–31, 19–37, 30–26, 26–31
Pts: Kevin Durant 29; Rebs: Kevin Durant 14; Asts: Devin Booker 8	Pts: Jamal Murray 34; Rebs: Nikola Jokić 19; Asts: Jamal Murray 9
Denver leads series, 1–0

Ball Arena, Denver, CO
Attendance: 19,762
Referees: Marc Davis, Josh Tiven, Tre Maddox

After missing their previous matchup in 2021 due to injury, Jamal Murray led the Nuggets' fast-paced offense with 34 points and six three-pointers as Denver snapped their seven-game playoff losing streak to the Suns. Nikola Jokić was productive as well, recording 24 points and 19 rebounds (8 of them offensive), while Aaron Gordon added 23 points on 9-of-13 shooting. For Phoenix, Kevin Durant scored 29 points and grabbed 14 rebounds for the Suns, while Devin Booker added 27 points and eight assists as the duo each scored 25-plus points for the sixth straight game. Although the Suns finished with a better field goal percentage, the Nuggets dominated the three-point line, outscoring Phoenix by a 48–21 margin and forcing 16 turnovers.

TNT

May 1
10:00 p.m. (8:00 p.m. MDT)

Recap

Phoenix Suns 87, Denver Nuggets 97
Scoring by quarter: 21–18, 21–22, 31–30, 14–27
Pts: Devin Booker 35; Rebs: Ayton, Durant 8 each Asts: Booker, Paul 6 each	Pts: Nikola Jokić 39; Rebs: Nikola Jokić 16; Asts: Jamal Murray 8
Denver leads series, 2–0

Ball Arena, Denver, CO
Attendance: 19,592
Referees: John Goble, Eric Lewis, Sean Wright

Nikola Jokić scored 26 of his 39 points in the second half and had 16 rebounds to lead the Nuggets to a 2–0 series advantage over the Suns. Jokic's performance was crucial for Denver, as Jamal Murray only scored ten points on 3-of-15 shooting, having scored 34 in the series opener. Aaron Gordon added 16 points and Kentavious Caldwell-Pope contributed 14 points, including back-to-back three-pointers that put the Nuggets ahead for good in the fourth quarter. Devin Booker led Phoenix with 35 points, but the team lost Chris Paul to a groin injury, and they struggled shooting in the fourth quarter, scoring 14 points on 28% shooting. Kevin Durant added 24 points, but went 10-of-27 shooting, including just 2-for-12 from beyond the arc.

ESPN

May 5
10:00 p.m. (7:00 p.m. MST)

Recap

Denver Nuggets 114, Phoenix Suns 121
Scoring by quarter: 31–29, 21–38, 36–23, 26–31
Pts: Jamal Murray 32; Rebs: Nikola Jokić 17; Asts: Nikola Jokić 17	Pts: Devin Booker 47; Rebs: three players 9 each (Note: Ayton, Durant, and Landale); Asts: Devin Booker 9
Denver leads series, 2–1

Footprint Center, Phoenix, AZ
Attendance: 17,071
Referees: Zach Zarba, James Williams, Sean Corbin

Without Chris Paul and down 2–0 in the series, Devin Booker shot 80% (20-of-25) from the field and tied his playoff career-high with 47 points, recording his third 45-point performance of the playoffs en route to cutting Denver's series lead to 2–1. Kevin Durant contributed 39 points as he and Booker accounted for 86 of Phoenix's 121 points, as no one else on the Suns scored more than seven points. For Denver, Nikola Jokić had a triple-double with 30 points, 17 assists, and 17 rebounds, Jamal Murray added 32 points, and Michael Porter Jr. chipped in 21 points and 12 rebounds. Despite a 15-point halftime lead, Phoenix trailed by three late in the third quarter. However, they rode a 14–0 run to give them a lead they would not relinquish.

TNT

May 7
8:00 p.m. (5:00 p.m. MST)

Recap

Denver Nuggets 124, Phoenix Suns 129
Scoring by quarter: 34–32, 27–31, 31–35, 32–31
Pts: Nikola Jokić 53; Rebs: Michael Porter Jr. 10; Asts: Nikola Jokić 11	Pts: Booker, Durant 36 each Rebs: Kevin Durant 11; Asts: Devin Booker 12
Series tied, 2–2

Footprint Center, Phoenix, AZ
Attendance: 17,071
Referees: Tony Brothers, Ed Malloy, Jacyn Goble

Despite a career-high 53 points from Nikola Jokić, the Suns were able to defend home court and tie the series at two games apiece, with Devin Booker and Kevin Durant each scoring 36 points. Booker shot 14-of-18 from the field, as he boosted his shooting percentage at home to 79% (34-of-43) for the series. The Suns were able to take a six-point lead into the fourth quarter after a scoring flurry from Booker, who had 17 points in the third quarter. Although Denver attempted to rally, backup guard Landry Shamet made four timely three-pointers to keep Phoenix ahead, as the Suns' bench outscored the Nuggets' bench 40–11. For Denver, Nikola Jokić shot 20-of-30 from the field, while Jamal Murray added 28 points and seven assists.

- With 2:36 remaining in the second quarter, Jokić got into an alteration with Suns owner Mat Ishbia, which resulted in Jokić shoving Ishbia during a dead ball. Jokić was fined $25,000 for the incident.

TNT

May 9
10:00 p.m. (8:00 p.m. MDT)

Recap

Phoenix Suns 102, Denver Nuggets 118
Scoring by quarter: 24–35, 25–17, 25–39, 28–27
Pts: Devin Booker 28; Rebs: Kevin Durant 11; Asts: Kevin Durant 7	Pts: Nikola Jokić 29; Rebs: Nikola Jokić 13; Asts: Nikola Jokić 12
Denver leads series, 3–2

Ball Arena, Denver, CO
Attendance: 19,773
Referees: David Guthrie, Bill Kennedy, Brian Forte

Nikola Jokić's tenth career playoff triple-double led the Nuggets to a pivotal Game 5 victory over the Suns, improving to 37–4 at home this season with Jokić on the floor. Jokić had a standout third quarter, as he made 7-of-8 shots for 17 points and helped the Nuggets turn a three-point halftime lead into a 91–74 advantage. Michael Porter Jr. scored 14 of his 19 points in the first quarter, Jamal Murray contributed 19 points and six assists, and Bruce Brown scored 25 of Denver's 34 bench points. Although Devin Booker and Kevin Durant each scored 25-plus points for the ninth time this postseason, the Suns were outrebounded 50–42 and outshot from beyond the arc 48% to 33%, as they trailed by as much as 24 points.

ESPN

May 11
10:00 p.m. (7:00 p.m. MST)

Recap

Denver Nuggets 125, Phoenix Suns 100
Scoring by quarter: 44–26, 37–25, 22–25, 22–24
Pts: Nikola Jokić 32; Rebs: Nikola Jokić 10; Asts: Nikola Jokić 12	Pts: Cameron Payne 31; Rebs: Payne, Shamet 6 each Asts: Devin Booker 8
Denver wins series, 4–2

Footprint Center, Phoenix, AZ
Attendance: 17,071
Referees: Marc Davis, Ben Taylor, Tyler Ford

The Nuggets secured a spot in the conference finals by defeating the shorthanded Suns by 25 points, the largest win margin by a road team this postseason. Denver dominated the game, using a 23–2 run in the latter part of the first quarter to establish a commanding 44–26 lead. Kentavious Caldwell-Pope, who had been averaging 9.5 points in the playoffs, scored 17 points in the first quarter, while Nikola Jokić contributed 14. Denver's offensive onslaught continued, as the lead had grown to 81–51 by halftime. Jokić finished the game with his third triple-double of the series, and Jamal Murray added 26 points. Cameron Payne led Phoenix, who were without Deandre Ayton and Chris Paul, with a career-high 31 points, hitting 7-of-9 three-pointers. Kevin Durant added 23 points, but missed nine of his first ten shots as the Suns fell behind by 30 points at halftime in an elimination game for the second straight year.

- Notably, this was Al McCoy's final game, concluding his 51-year career as the Suns' play-by-play radio announcer.

Regular-season series
Tied 2–2 in the regular-season series

December 25, 2022

Recap

Phoenix Suns 125, Denver Nuggets 128 (OT)

Ball Arena, Denver, CO

January 11, 2023

Recap

Phoenix Suns 97, Denver Nuggets 126

Ball Arena, Denver, CO

March 31, 2023

Recap

Denver Nuggets 93, Phoenix Suns 100

Footprint Center, Phoenix, AZ

April 6, 2023

Recap

Denver Nuggets 115, Phoenix Suns 119

Footprint Center, Phoenix, AZ

This was the fifth playoff meeting between these two teams, with the Suns winning three of the first four meetings.

Previous playoff series
Phoenix leads 3–1 in all-time playoff series

1982

Denver Nuggets 1, Phoenix Suns 2

1982 Western Conference First Round

1983

Phoenix Suns 1, Denver Nuggets 2

1983 Western Conference First Round

1989

Phoenix Suns 3, Denver Nuggets 0

1989 Western Conference First Round

2021

Phoenix Suns 4, Denver Nuggets 0

2021 Western Conference semifinals

==== (6) Golden State Warriors vs. (7) Los Angeles Lakers ====
TNT

May 2
10:00 p.m. (7:00 p.m. PDT)

Recap

Los Angeles Lakers 117, Golden State Warriors 112
Scoring by quarter: 29–31, 36–33, 31–24, 21–24
Pts: Anthony Davis 30; Rebs: Anthony Davis 23; Asts: D'Angelo Russell 6	Pts: Stephen Curry 27; Rebs: Kevon Looney 23; Asts: Draymond Green 7
LA Lakers lead series, 1–0

Chase Center, San Francisco, CA
Attendance: 18,064
Referees: Marc Davis, Ed Malloy, Nick Buchert

Anthony Davis put up 30 points, 23 rebounds, and four blocks, while LeBron James added 22 points and 11 boards as the Lakers held off a late push by Golden State to win Game 1 on the road. D'Angelo Russell had 19 points and six assists, while Dennis Schröder scored 19 points off the bench. The Warriors, who made 21 three-pointers, were led by Stephen Curry's 27 points, Klay Thompson's 25 points, and Kevon Looney's career-high 23 rebounds, marking his fourth 20-rebound game of the playoffs. Down 14 with under six minutes left, Golden State went on a 14–0 run to tie the game. The Lakers regained the lead, and the Warriors' late rally fell short as Jordan Poole missed a three to tie the game with under ten seconds left.

ESPN

May 4
9:00 p.m. (6:00 p.m. PDT)

Recap

Los Angeles Lakers 100, Golden State Warriors 127
Scoring by quarter: 33–26, 23–41, 24–43, 20–17
Pts: LeBron James 23; Rebs: Davis, James 7 each Asts: D'Angelo Russell 8	Pts: Klay Thompson 30; Rebs: Draymond Green 11; Asts: Stephen Curry 12
Series tied, 1–1

Chase Center, San Francisco, CA
Attendance: 18,064
Referees: Tony Brothers, Eric Lewis, Pat Fraher

After Los Angeles took a seven-point lead into the second quarter, the defending champions took control of the game, outscoring the Lakers 84–47 in the second and third quarters to even the series at 1–1. Klay Thompson scored 30 points with eight three-pointers, while Stephen Curry added 20 points and 12 assists as the Warriors made 21 more threes in Game 2, giving them an NBA-record 42 total in the series' first two games. JaMychal Green scored a playoff career-high 15 points in his first playoff start since 2019, while Draymond Green contributed 11 points, 11 boards, and nine assists. LeBron James scored 23 points for the Lakers, but Anthony Davis had a quiet night, finishing with 11 points on 5-of-11 shooting.

ABC

May 6
8:30 p.m. (5:30 p.m. PDT)

Recap

Golden State Warriors 97, Los Angeles Lakers 127
Scoring by quarter: 30–23, 18–36, 20–27, 29–41
Pts: Stephen Curry 23; Rebs: Andrew Wiggins 9 Asts: Jordan Poole 6	Pts: Anthony Davis 25; Rebs: Anthony Davis 13; Asts: LeBron James 8
LA Lakers lead series, 2–1

Crypto.com Arena, Los Angeles, CA
Attendance: 18,997
Referees: David Guthrie, Bill Kennedy, Mitchell Ervin

After Golden State took a seven-point lead into the second quarter, the seventh-seeded Lakers took control of the game, outscoring the Warriors 63–38 in the second and third quarters to regain the series lead. Anthony Davis led the way with 25 points and 13 rebounds on 7-of-10 shooting, while LeBron James finished the game with 21 points, eight assists, and eight rebounds. D'Angelo Russell also hit five three-pointers and scored 21 points for Los Angeles, who moved to 4–0 at home in the playoffs. Golden State meanwhile struggled offensively, committing 19 turnovers and shooting 40% from the field. Stephen Curry scored 23 points, while Andrew Wiggins had 16 for the Warriors, who trailed by as much as 34 points.

TNT

May 8
10:00 p.m. (7:00 p.m. PDT)

Recap

Golden State Warriors 101, Los Angeles Lakers 104
Scoring by quarter: 21–22, 31–27, 32–28, 17–27
Pts: Stephen Curry 31; Rebs: Curry, D. Green 10 each Asts: Stephen Curry 14	Pts: LeBron James 27; Rebs: Anthony Davis 15; Asts: LeBron James 6
LA Lakers lead series, 3–1

Crypto.com Arena, Los Angeles, CA
Attendance: 18,997
Referees: Scott Foster, Kevin Scott, Curtis Blair

Down by seven entering the final quarter, the Lakers rode a 15-point fourth-quarter performance from Lonnie Walker IV to take a 3–1 series lead over the defending champions. Walker, who made the same number of field goals as the entire Warriors team did in the fourth quarter, hit a go-ahead jumper with under two minutes left and made two crucial free throws with 15 seconds to play. LeBron James contributed 27 points and six assists, Austin Reaves scored 21 points, and Anthony Davis had 23 points and 15 rebounds for Los Angeles. For the Warriors, Stephen Curry had 31 points, ten rebounds, and 14 assists in his third career postseason triple-double, but he missed 11-of-14 three-point attempts and turned the ball over in the final seconds.

TNT

May 10
10:00 p.m. (7:00 p.m. PDT)

Recap

Los Angeles Lakers 106, Golden State Warriors 121
Scoring by quarter: 28–32, 31–38, 23–23, 24–28
Pts: LeBron James 25; Rebs: Davis, James 9 each Asts: Austin Reaves 5	Pts: Stephen Curry 27; Rebs: Draymond Green 10; Asts: Stephen Curry 8
LA Lakers lead series, 3–2

Chase Center, San Francisco, CA
Attendance: 18,064
Referees: Zach Zarba, James Williams, Gediminas Petraitis

In a must-win situation, the Warriors rallied behind Stephen Curry's 27 points and eight assists, along with Andrew Wiggins' 25 points and seven rebounds to avoid elimination. Draymond Green contributed 20 points and ten rebounds, while Gary Payton II scored 13 points. Golden State made seven of their 13 total three-pointers in the first quarter as they took an 11-point lead into halftime, with their 70 first-half points marking the most they've scored since 2019. Meanwhile, the Lakers struggled with rebounding, being outrebounded 48–38 overall, along with committing 14 turnovers that led to 20 Warriors points. LeBron James had 25 points and nine rebounds, while Anthony Davis added 23 points and nine boards for Los Angeles.

ESPN

May 12
10:00 p.m. (7:00 p.m. PDT)

Recap

Golden State Warriors 101, Los Angeles Lakers 122
Scoring by quarter: 26–31, 20–25, 31–35, 24–31
Pts: Stephen Curry 32; Rebs: Kevon Looney 18; Asts: Curry, Thompson 5 each	Pts: LeBron James 30; Rebs: Anthony Davis 20; Asts: LeBron James 9
LA Lakers win series, 4–2

Crypto.com Arena, Los Angeles, CA
Attendance: 18,997
Referees: John Goble, Courtney Kirkland, Mark Lindsay

After starting the season with a 2–10 record, the Lakers advanced to their second conference finals in four years and became just the second No. 7 seed to clinch a conference finals berth. LeBron James had 30 points, nine rebounds, and nine assists, while Anthony Davis contributed 17 points and 20 rebounds. Additionally, Austin Reaves scored 23 points, including a 54-foot shot from midcourt at the halftime buzzer, as Los Angeles never trailed in the game. Stephen Curry scored a game-high 32 points, but Donte DiVincenzo was his only teammate to finish in double figures. Klay Thompson missed ten of his 12 three-point attempts as the Splash Brothers went dry when it mattered most, with Thompson going 10-of-36 from deep in the final four games, while Curry was 14-of-49. This also marked the Warriors' first playoff series loss to a Western Conference opponent under Steve Kerr, having previously gone 19–0.

Regular-season series
LA Lakers won 3–1 in the regular-season series

October 18, 2022

Recap

Los Angeles Lakers 109, Golden State Warriors 123

Chase Center, San Francisco, CA

February 11, 2023

Recap

Los Angeles Lakers 109, Golden State Warriors 103

Chase Center, San Francisco, CA

February 23, 2023

Recap

Golden State Warriors 111, Los Angeles Lakers 124

Crypto.com Arena, Los Angeles, CA

March 5, 2023

Recap

Golden State Warriors 105, Los Angeles Lakers 113

Crypto.com Arena, Los Angeles, CA

This was the eighth playoff meeting between these two teams, with the Lakers winning six of the first seven meetings.

Previous playoff series
LA Lakers lead 6–1 in all-time playoff series

1967

San Francisco Warriors 3, Los Angeles Lakers 0

1967 Western Division semifinals

1968

Los Angeles Lakers 4, San Francisco Warriors 0

1968 Western Division finals

1969

Los Angeles Lakers 4, San Francisco Warriors 2

1969 Western Division semifinals

1973

Los Angeles Lakers 4, Golden State Warriors 1

1973 Western Conference finals

1977

Los Angeles Lakers 4, Golden State Warriors 3

1977 Western Conference semifinals

1987

Los Angeles Lakers 4, Golden State Warriors 1

1987 Western Conference semifinals

1991

Los Angeles Lakers 4, Golden State Warriors 1

1991 Western Conference semifinals

== Conference finals ==
Note: Times are EDT (UTC−4) as listed by the NBA. If the venue is located in a different time zone, the local time is also given.

=== Eastern Conference finals ===
==== (2) Boston Celtics vs. (8) Miami Heat ====
TNT

May 17
8:30 p.m.

Recap

Miami Heat 123, Boston Celtics 116
Scoring by quarter: 28–30, 29–36, 46–25, 20–25
Pts: Jimmy Butler 35; Rebs: Bam Adebayo 8 Asts: Jimmy Butler 7	Pts: Jayson Tatum 30; Rebs: Jaylen Brown 9 Asts: Marcus Smart 11
Miami leads series, 1–0

TD Garden, Boston, MA
Attendance: 19,156
Referees: Marc Davis, Ed Malloy, Rodney Mott

Jimmy Butler and the eight-seeded Heat rallied in the second half to win Game 1 on the road for the third straight series, becoming just the fifth team ever to do so. Trailing by nine at halftime, Miami scored a franchise playoff-record 46 points in the third quarter, as they were fueled by their success from beyond the arc, shooting over 50% from deep (16-of-31). Butler scored a game-high 35 points to go along with seven assists, six steals, and five rebounds. Bam Adebayo added 20 points, while Kyle Lowry, Caleb Martin, Gabe Vincent, and Max Strus each scored 15 points. Jayson Tatum led the Celtics with 30 points, but failed to attempt a shot in the fourth quarter. Jaylen Brown added 22 points and nine rebounds, while Malcolm Brogdon contributed 19 points. Although Boston narrowed the deficit to four points late in the fourth quarter, they ultimately fell short, dropping to 4–4 at home this postseason.

TNT

May 19
8:30 p.m.

Recap

Miami Heat 111, Boston Celtics 105
Scoring by quarter: 24–25, 30–25, 21–33, 36–22
Pts: Jimmy Butler 27; Rebs: Bam Adebayo 17; Asts: Bam Adebayo 9	Pts: Jayson Tatum 34; Rebs: Jayson Tatum 13; Asts: Jayson Tatum 8
Miami leads series, 2–0

TD Garden, Boston, MA
Attendance: 19,156
Referees: Zach Zarba, James Williams, Tyler Ford

Similar to how they defeated the Milwaukee Bucks and New York Knicks, the Heat overcame their sixth double-digit deficit of the playoffs to take a commanding 2–0 series lead back to Miami. Jimmy Butler scored 27 points, including nine points during an 18–4 run late in the fourth quarter that turned a nine-point deficit into a 105–100 lead. Bam Adebayo recorded 22 points, 17 rebounds, and nine assists, while Caleb Martin came off the bench and provided a season-high 25 points as the Heat became the first No. 8 seed to take a 2–0 series lead in the conference finals. Meanwhile, Jayson Tatum put up 34 points, 13 rebounds, and eight assists, but he failed to make a field goal in the fourth quarter for the second straight game. Jaylen Brown did not fare well either, as he converted just seven of his 23 shot attempts and went 1-of-5 from the field in the fourth, as Miami outscored Boston 36–22 in the final quarter.

TNT

May 21
8:30 p.m.

Recap

Boston Celtics 102, Miami Heat 128
Scoring by quarter: 22–30, 24–31, 17–32, 39–35
Pts: Jayson Tatum 14; Rebs: Jayson Tatum 10; Asts: Marcus Smart 8	Pts: Gabe Vincent 29; Rebs: Jimmy Butler 8 Asts: Jimmy Butler 6
Miami leads series, 3–0

Kaseya Center, Miami, FL
Attendance: 20,088
Referees: Tony Brothers, Kevin Scott, Curtis Blair

In a dominant team effort, the eight-seeded Heat improved to 6–0 at home this postseason and moved one win away from their sixth NBA Finals appearance in the last 13 seasons. Gabe Vincent scored a career-high 29 points on 11-of-14 shooting, Duncan Robinson scored 22, and Caleb Martin added 18 points, all of whom went undrafted. In addition, Jimmy Butler had 16 points and six assists, Bam Adebayo added 13, and Max Strus scored ten points for the Heat. For Boston, the All-NBA duo of Jayson Tatum and Jaylen Brown were a no-show, as they combined for just 26 points on 12-of-35 (34%) from the field and 1-of-14 (7%) from three-point range. The Celtics also lacked effort on defense, as they allowed Miami to shoot 57% from the field and 54% from beyond the arc, resulting in a substantial 33-point deficit in the third quarter that prompted head coach Joe Mazzulla to empty his bench for the final 12 minutes.

TNT

May 23
8:30 p.m.

Recap

Boston Celtics 116, Miami Heat 99
Scoring by quarter: 23–29, 27–27, 38–23, 28–20
Pts: Jayson Tatum 33; Rebs: Jayson Tatum 11; Asts: Jayson Tatum 7	Pts: Jimmy Butler 29; Rebs: Jimmy Butler 9 Asts: Kyle Lowry 6
Miami leads series, 3–1

Kaseya Center, Miami, FL
Attendance: 20,147
Referees: Scott Foster, John Goble, Courtney Kirkland

Led by Jayson Tatum's 33 points, 11 rebounds, and seven assists, the Celtics fought off elimination and forced the series back to Boston. The Heat initially held a nine-point lead in the second half, but a 48–22 scoring run by Boston in just 14 minutes turned the game in their favor, as Tatum scored 25 of his 33 points in the second half. Jaylen Brown contributed 17 points and Derrick White added 16 points, while Grant Williams, Al Horford, and Marcus Smart each scored in double figures. Jimmy Butler led the Heat's efforts with 29 points and nine rebounds, while Gabe Vincent and Caleb Martin added 17 and 16 points, respectively. The Heat struggled from beyond the arc, shooting 8-of-32 (25%) from deep, while the Celtics made 18-of-45 (40%) three-pointers, creating a significant 30-point difference in scoring from long range. Boston also capitalized on Miami's mistakes, as they scored 27 points off 16 turnovers.

TNT

May 25
8:30 p.m.

Recap

Miami Heat 97, Boston Celtics 110
Scoring by quarter: 20–35, 24–26, 28–29, 25–20
Pts: Duncan Robinson 18; Rebs: Bam Adebayo 8 Asts: Duncan Robinson 9	Pts: Derrick White 24; Rebs: Al Horford 11; Asts: Jayson Tatum 11
Miami leads series, 3–2

TD Garden, Boston, MA
Attendance: 19,156
Referees: Marc Davis, David Guthrie, Bill Kennedy

In front of their home crowd, the Celtics dominated the Heat from the jump, surging to a 23–7 lead that set the tone for the rest of the game as Boston moved two wins away from becoming the first NBA team ever to overcome a 3–0 series deficit. Derrick White scored 24 points and connected on six three-pointers, while Marcus Smart contributed 23 points and five steals. Jayson Tatum and Jaylen Brown each added 21 points as Boston improved to 4–0 in elimination games this postseason. With Gabe Vincent out with an ankle sprain, Miami struggled to find their offensive footing, as the Heat were forced into ten first-half turnovers that led to 17 Boston points. Duncan Robinson led Miami in scoring with 18 points, while Bam Adebayo contributed 16 points and eight rebounds. Jimmy Butler, who had been averaging 30 points this postseason, finished with an underwhelming 14 points as Miami never led.

TNT

May 27
8:30 p.m.

Recap

Boston Celtics 104, Miami Heat 103
Scoring by quarter: 34–29, 23–24, 22–19, 25–31
Pts: Jayson Tatum 31; Rebs: Jayson Tatum 12; Asts: Derrick White 6	Pts: Jimmy Butler 24; Rebs: Caleb Martin 15; Asts: Jimmy Butler 8
Series tied, 3–3

Kaseya Center, Miami, FL
Attendance: 20,201
Referees: Zach Zarba, Josh Tiven, James Williams

With just a mere tenth of a second remaining on the clock, Derrick White emerged as the hero, scoring a crucial putback to secure the win for the Celtics, joining Michael Jordan as the second player in NBA history to hit a buzzer-beater with his team trailing and facing elimination. In addition, Jayson Tatum scored 31 points, Jaylen Brown scored 26, and Marcus Smart added 21 for Boston, who became only the fourth team to erase a 0–3 deficit and force a decisive game 7. For the Heat, the duo of Jimmy Butler and Bam Adebayo went 5-of-30 from the field in the first three quarters, combining for just 18 points. However, trailing by ten with under four minutes to go, Butler scored 13 of his 24 points during a 15–4 run that gave Miami the lead with three seconds left. After a Celtics timeout, White inbounded the ball to Smart, who missed a three-pointer, but White crashed the boards and scored the game-winning tip shot.

TNT

May 29
8:30 p.m.

Recap

Miami Heat 103, Boston Celtics 84
Scoring by quarter: 22–15, 30–26, 24–25, 27–18
Pts: Jimmy Butler 28; Rebs: Adebayo, Martin 10 each Asts: Bam Adebayo 7	Pts: Jaylen Brown 19; Rebs: Jayson Tatum 11; Asts: Jaylen Brown 5
Miami wins series, 4–3

TD Garden, Boston, MA
Attendance: 19,156
Referees: Scott Foster, Tony Brothers, John Goble

Following their defeat in a decisive seventh game against the Celtics last year, the Heat overcame the setback of squandering a 3–0 series lead to secure their second NBA Finals appearance in four seasons. Caleb Martin, who averaged just 9.6 points in the regular season, scored a playoff career-high 26 points on 11-of-16 shooting, finishing the series averaging 19.3 points. Jimmy Butler scored a game-high 28 points, while Bam Adebayo recorded his seventh double-double of the playoffs as the Heat became the first No. 8 seed to reach the Finals in a full 82-game regular season. The Celtics meanwhile were discombobulated from the start, as they missed their first 12 three-point attempts and finished the game shooting 21% from deep. Derrick White scored 18 for Boston, and Jayson Tatum had 14 points with 11 rebounds after turning his ankle on the first play of the game. Jaylen Brown contributed 19 points and eight rebounds, but shot 1-of-9 from beyond the arc and committed a playoff-high eight turnovers as Boston lost their 12th playoff game at home over the last two postseasons.

- Butler was awarded the second annual Eastern Conference finals MVP, averaging 24.7 points, 7.6 rebounds, and 6.1 assists on 42% from the field, 35% from beyond the arc, and 83% from the free-throw line. Had the Celtics won the game, they would have become the first NBA team to overcome the 3–0 series deficit (and second basketball team overall, after the PBA's San Miguel Beermen in the 2015–16 PBA Philippine Cup Finals).

Regular-season series
Tied 2–2 in the regular-season series

October 21, 2022

Recap

Boston Celtics 111, Miami Heat 104

FTX Arena, Miami, FL

November 30, 2022

Recap

Miami Heat 121, Boston Celtics 134

TD Garden, Boston, MA

December 2, 2022

Recap

Miami Heat 120, Boston Celtics 116 (OT)

TD Garden, Boston, MA

January 24, 2023

Recap

Boston Celtics 95, Miami Heat 98

Miami-Dade Arena, Miami, FL

This was the sixth playoff meeting between the two teams, with the Heat winning three of the first five meetings.

Previous playoffs series
Miami leads 3–2 in all-time playoff series

2010

Boston Celtics 4, Miami Heat 1

2010 Eastern Conference First Round

2011

Miami Heat 4, Boston Celtics 1

2011 Eastern Conference semifinals

2012

Miami Heat 4, Boston Celtics 3

2012 Eastern Conference finals

2020

Boston Celtics 2, Miami Heat 4

2020 Eastern Conference finals

2022

Miami Heat 3, Boston Celtics 4

2022 Eastern Conference finals

=== Western Conference finals ===
==== (1) Denver Nuggets vs. (7) Los Angeles Lakers ====
ESPN

May 16
8:30 p.m. (6:30 p.m. MDT)

Recap

Los Angeles Lakers 126, Denver Nuggets 132
Scoring by quarter: 25–37, 29–35, 38–34, 34–26
Pts: Anthony Davis 40; Rebs: LeBron James 12; Asts: LeBron James 9	Pts: Nikola Jokić 34; Rebs: Nikola Jokić 21; Asts: Nikola Jokić 14
Denver leads series, 1–0

Ball Arena, Denver, CO
Attendance: 19,633
Referees: Zach Zarba, Eric Lewis, Ben Taylor

Looking to advance to their first NBA Finals in their 47th season, the Nuggets got off on the right track, as Nikola Jokić recorded his sixth triple-double of the playoffs to propel Denver to a 1–0 series lead. Jokić notched 34 points, 21 rebounds, and 14 assists on 12-of-17 shooting as he outrebounded the Lakers by himself in the first half, 16 to 13. Jokić's performance was backed by his teammates, as five other Denver players finished in double figures, with Jamal Murray scoring 31 points on 60% shooting. For the Lakers, Anthony Davis finished with 40 points, while LeBron James put up 26 points, 12 boards, and nine assists. Los Angeles trailed by as many as 21 but they pulled within three points multiple times in the fourth quarter, with Austin Reaves scoring 11 of his 23 points in the final quarter. However, the Lakers could not fully recover from their slow start, as the Nuggets improved to 7–0 at home this postseason.

ESPN

May 18
8:30 p.m. (6:30 p.m. MDT)

Recap

Los Angeles Lakers 103, Denver Nuggets 108
Scoring by quarter: 27–27, 26–21, 26–28, 24–32
Pts: James, Reaves 22 each Rebs: Anthony Davis 14; Asts: LeBron James 10	Pts: Jamal Murray 37; Rebs: Nikola Jokić 17; Asts: Nikola Jokić 12
Denver leads series, 2–0

Ball Arena, Denver, CO
Attendance: 19,742
Referees: Tony Brothers, David Guthrie, Brian Forte

Behind Jamal Murray's 23-point fourth quarter performance, the Nuggets took a commanding 2–0 series lead in the conference finals for the first time in franchise history. Although Murray was 5-of-17 from the field entering the fourth quarter, he shot 6-of-7 from the field and scored 23 of the Nuggets' 32 fourth quarter points. Murray's performance fueled a pivotal 15–1 run that gave Denver a lead they would not relinquish. Nikola Jokić also recorded his 13th playoff triple-double, contributing 23 points, 17 rebounds, and 12 assists as Denver moved to 39–4 at home this season with Jokić on the floor. Meanwhile, Rui Hachimura shot 7-for-7 in the first half and finished with 21 points for the Lakers, while Austin Reaves scored 22 points. However, the star duo of LeBron James and Anthony Davis shot a combined 13-of-34 from the floor, with James going 0-of-10 from beyond the arc in the first two games of the series.

ABC

May 20
8:30 p.m. (5:30 p.m. PDT)

Recap

Denver Nuggets 119, Los Angeles Lakers 108
Scoring by quarter: 32–20, 26–35, 26–27, 35–26
Pts: Jamal Murray 37; Rebs: Michael Porter Jr. 10; Asts: Nikola Jokić 8	Pts: Anthony Davis 28; Rebs: Anthony Davis 18; Asts: LeBron James 12
Denver leads series, 3–0

Crypto.com Arena, Los Angeles, CA
Attendance: 18,997
Referees: Scott Foster, Bill Kennedy, Mark Lindsay

After the Memphis Grizzlies and Golden State Warriors were both blown out in their first road game against the Lakers, the Nuggets flipped the script, as they handed the Lakers their first home loss since March 26 and moved to the brink of their first NBA Finals appearance. Trailing by one with under eight minutes remaining, the Nuggets orchestrated a decisive 13–0 run, capitalizing on a disciplined team performance that yielded 30 assists to just five turnovers. Jamal Murray picked up where he left off in Game 2, as he scored 30 of his 37 points in the first half, while Nikola Jokić scored 15 of his 24 points in the fourth quarter. Anthony Davis led the Lakers with 28 points and 18 rebounds, LeBron James contributed 23 points and 12 assists, and Austin Reaves contributed 23 points and seven rebounds. However, Los Angeles lacked scoring depth, as Rui Hachimura was the only other player to reach double figures.

ESPN

May 22
8:30 p.m. (5:30 p.m. PDT)

Recap

Denver Nuggets 113, Los Angeles Lakers 111
Scoring by quarter: 28–34, 30–39, 36–16, 19–22
Pts: Nikola Jokić 30; Rebs: Nikola Jokić 14; Asts: Nikola Jokić 13	Pts: LeBron James 40; Rebs: Anthony Davis 14; Asts: LeBron James 9
Denver wins series, 4–0

Crypto.com Arena, Los Angeles, CA
Attendance: 18,997
Referees: Marc Davis, Josh Tiven, Tre Maddox

The Nuggets exorcised their playoff demons against the Lakers and advanced to their first NBA Finals in their 47-year history. Denver faced a 15-point halftime deficit but opened the second half on a 36–14 run. Los Angeles tied the game in the closing minutes after erasing a seven-point deficit, but Nikola Jokić's 25-foot fallaway three-pointer and go-ahead layup sealed the Nuggets' first playoff series sweep in franchise history. Jokić broke an NBA playoff record with his eighth triple-double of the playoffs, recording 30 points, 14 rebounds, and 13 assists, while Jamal Murray and Aaron Gordon contributed 25 and 22 points, respectively. LeBron James matched his playoff career-high as a Laker with 40 points, ten boards, and nine assists, as his 31 points in the first half marked the highest-scoring playoff half of his career. However, James missed critical shots, including a potential game-tying shot that was blocked by Gordon in the final seconds. Anthony Davis contributed 21 points and 14 rebounds, and Austin Reaves scored 17 points as the Lakers were swept for the 11th time in team history.

- Jokić was awarded the second annual Western Conference finals MVP, averaging 27.8 points, 14.5 rebounds, and 11.8 assists on 51% from the field, 47% from beyond the arc, and 78% from the free-throw line.

Regular-season series
Tied 2–2 in the regular-season series

October 26, 2022

Recap

Los Angeles Lakers 99, Denver Nuggets 110

Ball Arena, Denver, CO

October 30, 2022

Recap

Denver Nuggets 110, Los Angeles Lakers 121

Crypto.com Arena, Los Angeles, CA

December 16, 2022

Recap

Denver Nuggets 108, Los Angeles Lakers 126

Crypto.com Arena, Los Angeles, CA

January 9, 2023

Recap

Los Angeles Lakers 109, Denver Nuggets 122

Ball Arena, Denver, CO

This was the eighth playoff meeting between these two teams, with the Lakers winning the first seven meetings.

Previous playoffs series
LA Lakers lead 7–0 in all-time playoff series

1979

Denver Nuggets 1, Los Angeles Lakers 2

1979 Western Conference First Round

1985

Los Angeles Lakers 4, Denver Nuggets 1

1985 Western Conference finals

1987

Los Angeles Lakers 3, Denver Nuggets 0

1987 Western Conference First Round

2008

Los Angeles Lakers 4, Denver Nuggets 0

2008 Western Conference First Round

2009

Los Angeles Lakers 4, Denver Nuggets 2

2009 Western Conference finals

2012

Los Angeles Lakers 4, Denver Nuggets 3

2012 Western Conference First Round

2020

Los Angeles Lakers 4, Denver Nuggets 1

2020 Western Conference finals

== NBA Finals: (W1) Denver Nuggets vs. (E8) Miami Heat ==
Note: Times are EDT (UTC−4) as listed by the NBA. If the venue is located in a different time zone, the local time is also given.

ABC

June 1
8:30 p.m. (6:30 p.m. MDT)

Recap

Miami Heat 93, Denver Nuggets 104
Scoring by quarter: 20–29, 22–30, 21–25, 30–20
Pts: Bam Adebayo 26; Rebs: Bam Adebayo 13; Asts: Jimmy Butler 7	Pts: Nikola Jokić 27; Rebs: Michael Porter Jr. 13; Asts: Nikola Jokić 14
Denver leads series, 1–0

Ball Arena, Denver, CO
Attendance: 19,528
Referees: Marc Davis, David Guthrie, Ed Malloy

ABC

June 4
8:00 p.m. (6:00 p.m. MDT)

Recap

Miami Heat 111, Denver Nuggets 108
Scoring by quarter: 26–23, 25–34, 24–26, 36–25
Pts: Gabe Vincent 23; Rebs: Kevin Love 10; Asts: Jimmy Butler 9	Pts: Nikola Jokić 41; Rebs: Nikola Jokić 11; Asts: Jamal Murray 10
Series tied, 1–1

Ball Arena, Denver, CO
Attendance: 19,537
Referees: Zach Zarba, John Goble, Courtney Kirkland

ABC

June 7
8:30 p.m.

Recap

Denver Nuggets 109, Miami Heat 94
Scoring by quarter: 24–24, 29–24, 29–20, 27–26
Pts: Jamal Murray 34; Rebs: Nikola Jokić 21; Asts: Jokić, Murray 10 each	Pts: Jimmy Butler 28; Rebs: Bam Adebayo 17; Asts: Lowry, Strus 5 each
Denver leads series, 2–1

Kaseya Center, Miami, FL
Attendance: 20,019
Referees: Tony Brothers, Josh Tiven, Kevin Scott

ABC

June 9
8:30 p.m.

Recap

Denver Nuggets 108, Miami Heat 95
Scoring by quarter: 20–21, 35–30, 31–22, 22–22
Pts: Aaron Gordon 27; Rebs: Nikola Jokić 12; Asts: Jamal Murray 12	Pts: Jimmy Butler 25; Rebs: Bam Adebayo 11; Asts: Butler, Lowry 7 each
Denver leads series, 3–1

Kaseya Center, Miami, FL
Attendance: 20,184
Referees: Scott Foster, James Williams, Bill Kennedy

ABC

June 12
8:30 p.m. (6:30 p.m. MDT)

Recap

Miami Heat 89, Denver Nuggets 94
Scoring by quarter: 24–22, 27–22, 20–26, 18–24
Pts: Jimmy Butler 21; Rebs: Bam Adebayo 12; Asts: Jimmy Butler 5	Pts: Nikola Jokić 28; Rebs: Nikola Jokić 16; Asts: Jamal Murray 8
Denver wins series, 4–1

Ball Arena, Denver, CO
Attendance: 19,537
Referees: Marc Davis, David Guthrie, Josh Tiven

Regular-season series
Denver won 2–0 in the regular-season series

December 30, 2022

Recap

Miami Heat 119, Denver Nuggets 124

Ball Arena, Denver, CO

February 13, 2023

Recap

Denver Nuggets 112, Miami Heat 108

Miami-Dade Arena, Miami, FL

This was the first playoff meeting between these two teams.

== Statistical leaders ==
Category	Game high			Average			
Category	Player	Team	High	Player	Team	Avg.	GP
Points	Jimmy Butler	Miami Heat	56	Devin Booker	Phoenix Suns	33.7	11
Rebounds	Kevon Looney; Anthony Davis	Golden State Warriors; Los Angeles Lakers	23	Anthony Davis	Los Angeles Lakers	14.1	16
Assists	Nikola Jokić	Denver Nuggets	17	Trae Young	Atlanta Hawks	10.2	6
Steals	Jimmy Butler	Miami Heat	6	De'Aaron Fox	Sacramento Kings	2.1	7
Blocks	Anthony Davis	Los Angeles Lakers	7	Anthony Davis	Los Angeles Lakers	3.1	16

=== Total leaders ===
Points

1. Nikola Jokić - 600
2. Jimmy Butler - 592
3. Jayson Tatum - 543
4. Jamal Murray - 522
5. Jaylen Brown - 453

Rebounds

1. Nikola Jokić - 269
2. Bam Adebayo - 227
3. Anthony Davis - 225
4. Jayson Tatum - 210
5. Kevon Looney - 170

Assists

1. Nikola Jokić - 190
2. Jamal Murray - 142
3. Jimmy Butler - 129
4. Jayson Tatum - 105
5. LeBron James - 104

Steals

1. Jimmy Butler - 40
2. Jamal Murray - 30
3. Kentavious Caldwell-Pope - 26
4. Marcus Smart - 25
5. Kyle Lowry - 24

Blocks

1. Anthony Davis - 50
2. Al Horford - 34
3. Robert Williams III - 25
4. Joel Embiid - 25
5. Jayson Tatum - 21

Minutes

1. Jimmy Butler - 874
2. Bam Adebayo - 850
3. Jamal Murray - 799
4. Jayson Tatum - 799
5. Nikola Jokić - 789

== Media coverage ==
In the United States, games aired nationally across ABC, ESPN, TNT, and NBA TV. Each team's regional broadcaster televised local coverage of first-round games, with the exception of weekend games on ABC. As per the alternating rotation, ESPN/ABC had exclusive coverage of the Western Conference finals while TNT had exclusive coverage of the Eastern Conference finals. ABC had exclusive coverage of the NBA Finals for the 21st straight year.

Select ESPN broadcasts received an alternate presentation similar to Manningcast, anchored by Stephen A. Smith on ESPN2 and streamed on ESPN+ as NBA in Stephen A's World.

NBA TV games were available on NBA League Pass as part of its normal streaming service for that channel.

For other games, live streams were only available for pay-TV subscribers via authenticated streaming on ESPN and TNT's respective apps. In Canada, coverage was split between Sportsnet and TSN, with both simulcasting the U.S. national feed.

=== Most viewed playoff games ===
Rank	Round	Date	Game	Away team	Score	Home team	Network	Viewers (millions)	TV rating
1	NBA Finals	June 12	Game 5	Heat	89–94	Nuggets	ABC	13.08	7.0
2	Eastern Conference Finals	May 29	Game 7	Heat	103–84	Celtics	TNT	12.00	5.8
3	NBA Finals	June 4	Game 2	Heat	111–108	Nuggets	ABC	11.91	6.0
4	NBA Finals	June 1	Game 1	Heat	93–104	Nuggets	ABC	11.58	6.0
5	NBA Finals	June 7	Game 3	Nuggets	109–94	Heat	ABC	11.24	6.0
6	NBA Finals	June 9	Game 4	Nuggets	108–95	Heat	ABC	10.41	5.4
7	Western Conference First Round	April 30	Game 7	Warriors	120–100	Kings	ABC	9.84	5.0
8	Eastern Conference Finals	May 27	Game 6	Celtics	104–103	Heat	TNT	8.71	4.0
9	Western Conference Semifinals	May 12	Game 6	Warriors	101–122	Lakers	ESPN	8.64	4.3
10	Eastern Conference Semifinals	May 14	Game 7	76ers	88–112	Celtics	ABC	8.44	3.9

== Sponsorship ==
For the second straight year, the playoffs were officially known as the "2023 NBA Playoffs presented by Google Pixel". During the multiyear agreement with Google Pixel, this sponsorship provided the logo branding inside the venues and in official digital properties on-court, as well as commercial inventory during ABC, ESPN, TNT, and NBA TV's telecasts of the playoff games.
