= Eric Lewis (basketball) =

American basketball referee (born 1971)

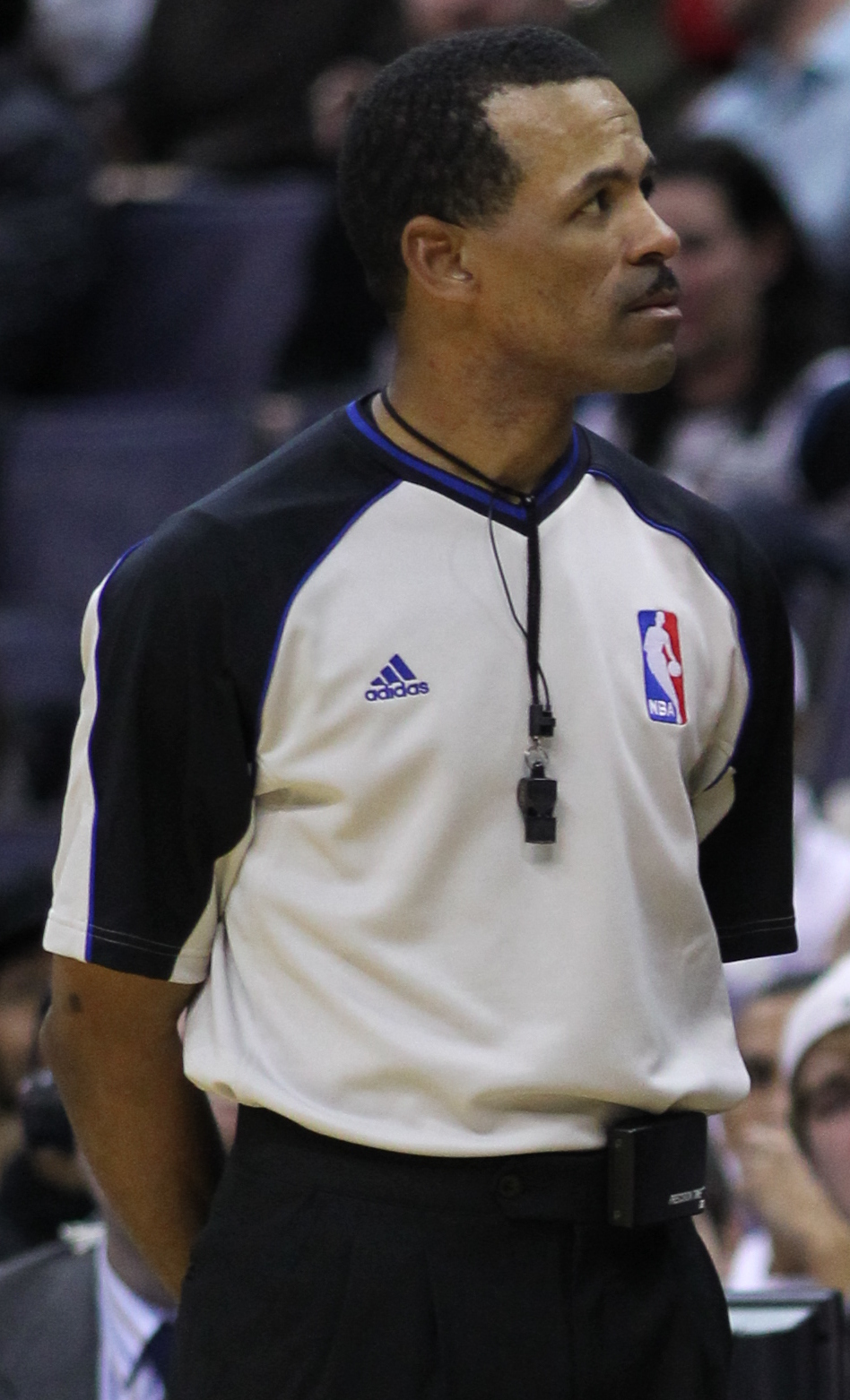
- Lewis in 2011
- Born: May 20, 1971 (age 55); Daytona Beach, Florida, U.S.
- Education: Bethune–Cookman University
- Basketball career
- Position: NBA referee
- Officiating career: 2005–Present

Eric Lewis (born May 20, 1971) is an American professional basketball referee who has worked in the National Basketball Association (NBA) for 19+ Seasons.

== Refereeing career ==
Lewis started his career officiating six years at the high school level, eight at the collegiate tier, two seasons in the United States Basketball League, and three years in the NBA G League, including the 2004 finals. He then became an NBA referee in 2005. Throughout his career, Lewis refereed 1,098 career games, with 82 playoff games, and six NBA Finals games.

Lewis came under controversy when on May 28, 2023, the NBA opened an investigation of Lewis for allegedly using a burner account on Twitter to defend himself and other NBA referees. On August 30, Lewis announced his immediate retirement, prompting the NBA to end its investigation into his social media activity.

During his two-year absence from the NBA's officiating program, Lewis worked as an NCAA men's basketball referee. On December 19, 2025, the NBA announced Lewis' reinstatement as a G League official.
