= Scott Foster (basketball) =

American basketball referee (born 1967)

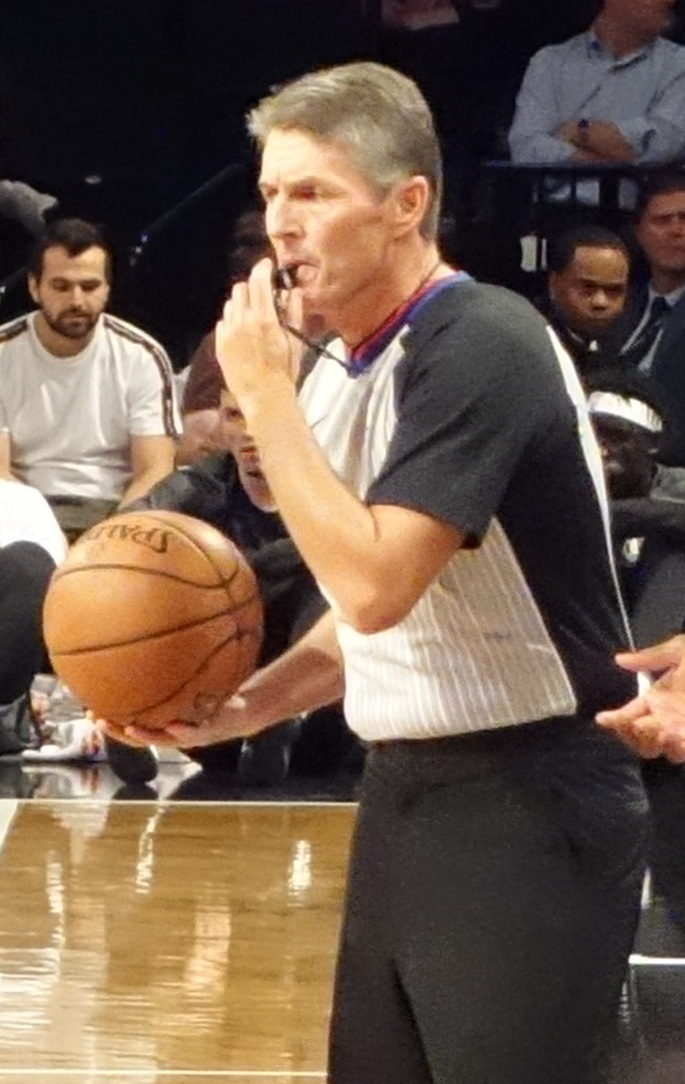
- Foster officiating a game in 2018
- Born: April 8, 1967 (age 59); Silver Spring, Maryland, U.S.
- Occupation: NBA referee
- Years active: 1992–present

Scott Foster (born April 8, 1967) is an American professional basketball referee for the National Basketball Association (NBA). He began officiating games for the NBA in the 1994–95 season and wears number 48.

Nicknamed "Agent 48" and "the Extender" by fans for seemingly lengthening playoff series, Foster has drawn much criticism from fans and players for his officiating. In an anonymized survey of nearly three dozen NBA players by the Los Angeles Times in 2016 and a separate anonymized survey of 108 NBA players by The Athletic in 2023, he was voted the worst referee in the NBA.

== Early life ==
Foster was born on April 8, 1967, in Silver Spring, Maryland. His father, Richard "Dicky" Foster, was a firefighter for Montgomery County, Maryland. Whenever Foster coached his younger brothers' basketball games at his local recreation center, he was required to officiate the following game, sparking his interest in becoming a referee.

While attending Magruder High School, Foster created the lawn mowing and trash disposal business Foster's Maintenance, which he passed onto his younger brother, David. While attending the University of Maryland, Foster would officiate high school basketball games in Washington, D.C.

== Officiating career ==
Before his career in the NBA, Foster worked as a referee for two years in the Continental Basketball Association and had officiated college and high school basketball games. In his second season of officiating NBA games, Foster was assigned to his first nationally televised game, an April 1996 match between the Los Angeles Lakers and Phoenix Suns. When the Lakers' point guard, Magic Johnson, bumped into Foster while contesting a call, Foster ejected Johnson, leading to the latter controversially receiving a three-game suspension and $10,000 fine.

As of the 2021–22 NBA season, Foster has officiated 1,617 regular-season games and 226 playoff games in 28 seasons. One of his most notable games was the deciding Game 7 of the 2010 NBA Finals between the Los Angeles Lakers and the Boston Celtics, which he officiated with Danny Crawford and Joey Crawford.

Critics of Foster have asserted that he issues technical fouls for seemingly arbitrary reasons, misses crucial foul calls, and favors certain teams. In February 2019, James Harden called Foster “rude and arrogant.” While serving as President of the National Basketball Players Association, Chris Paul often denounced Foster for favoring certain teams and players.
