= Quinten Post =

Dutch basketball player (born 2000)

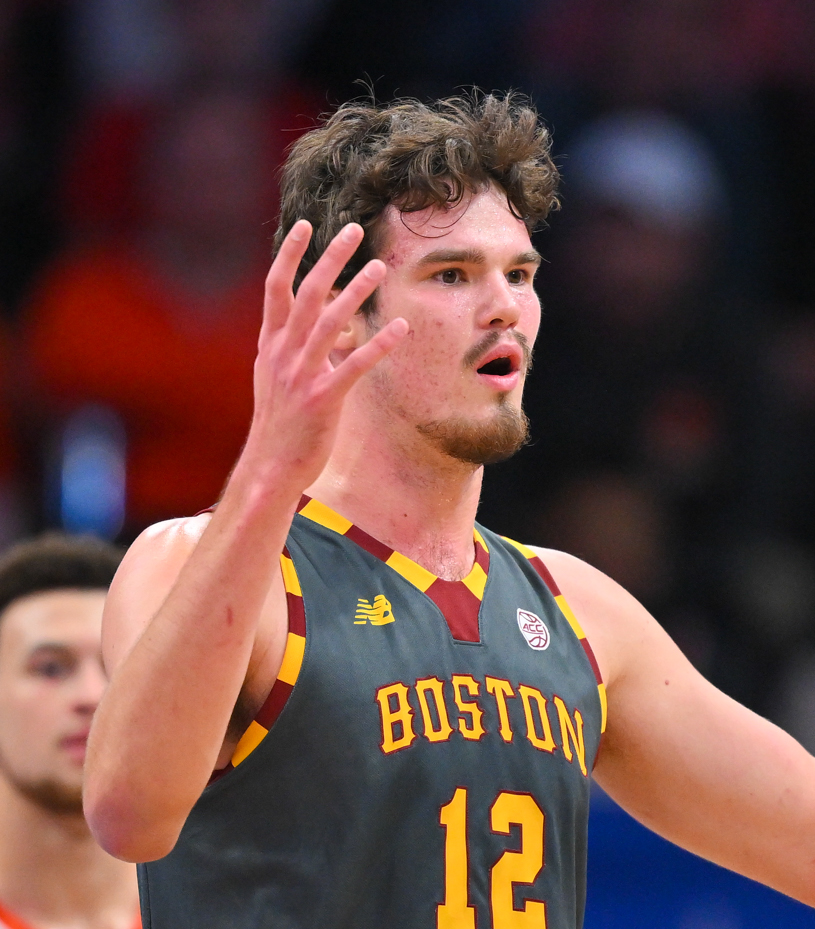
- Post with Boston College in 2024

No. 41 – Memphis Grizzlies
- Position: Center
- League: NBA

Personal information
- Born: 21 March 2000 (age 26) Amsterdam, Netherlands
- Listed height: 7 ft 0 in (2.13 m)
- Listed weight: 238 lb (108 kg)

Career information
- College: Mississippi State (2019–2021); Boston College (2021–2024)
- NBA draft: 2024: 2nd round, 52nd overall pick
- Drafted by: Golden State Warriors
- Playing career: 2024–present

Career history
- 2024–2026: Golden State Warriors
- 2024–2025: →Santa Cruz Warriors
- 2026–present: Memphis Grizzlies

Career highlights
- Second-team All-ACC (2024); ACC All-Defensive team (2024); ACC Most Improved Player (2023)
- Stats at NBA.com
- Stats at Basketball Reference

Quinten Post (born 21 March 2000) is a Dutch professional basketball player for the Memphis Grizzlies of the National Basketball Association (NBA). He played college basketball for the Mississippi State Bulldogs and the Boston College Eagles. Standing at 7 ft 0 in (2.13 m), he plays the power forward and center positions.

== Early career ==
Born in Amsterdam, Post played in the junior teams of Apollo Amsterdam at age 11. He had his growing spurt late, and before he was on the juniors' second or third teams in his age category. Post quit the sport for 1.5 year when he was in the under-16 team. He returned to play in the under-18 team, having grown to 2.04 m (6 ft 8 1/2 in), and began in the second team again. Post was promoted to the first team the next year and won the national under-18 championship in 2018 as the starting center. He attended the Cartesius Lyceum.

Post played together with Jesse Edwards while playing at Apollo Amsterdam.

== College career ==
Despite having offers to play for FC Barcelona Bàsquet B in Spain and KK Mega Basket in Serbia, Post opted to play college basketball in the United States. He committed to Mississippi State. Following limited playing time during his first two seasons at Mississippi State, Post transferred to Boston College for the 2021–22 season. In his final season, he was named Second Team All-ACC as well as the ACC All-Defensive Team.

== Professional career ==
=== Golden State Warriors (2024–2026) ===
On 27 June 2024, the Golden State Warriors selected Post with the 52nd overall pick in the 2024 NBA draft. He was the first Dutch player to be selected since Henk Norel in 2009. He was subsequently traded to the Portland Trail Blazers in a four-team-trade for Lindy Waters III, but then traded back to the Warriors for cash considerations. On a call with his parents, he cried tears of joy, but when they asked him where he was headed, he admitted he did not know. Weeks later he was presented by the Warriors and chose to wear the number 21.

On 26 September 2024, Post was signed to a two-way contract with the Warriors. In a 30 December game against the Cleveland Cavaliers, Post scored his first career NBA points on a putback following a Pat Spencer miss.

On 23 January 2025, Post scored a career-high 20 points for the Warriors in a 131–106 home game win over the Chicago Bulls. He also grabbed 5 rebounds and gave 3 assists. On January 29, Post made his first career start in a win against the Oklahoma City Thunder, 116–109.

On 7 February 2025, the Warriors announced that they had signed Post to standard NBA contract. The next day, Post started and scored 18 points with 3 rebounds in a 132–111 victory over the Chicago Bulls. On 29 June 2025, the Warriors exercised the team option for Post.

In February 2026, Post and fellow countryman Malevy Leons became the first pair of Dutch teammates in the NBA since 2009.

=== Memphis Grizzlies (2026–present) ===
On 6 July 2026, the Memphis Grizzlies signed Post to a three-year, $30 million offer sheet. The Warriors declined to match the offer sheet, and on 8 July, Post officially signed with the Grizzlies. On 21 October, he made his Grizzlies debut, scoring seven points in a 123–103 win over the Utah Jazz.

== National team career ==
Post was selected for the preliminary roster of the Netherlands senior team ahead of EuroBasket 2022.

== Career statistics ==
Legend
GP	Games played	GS	Games started	MPG	Minutes per game
FG%	Field goal percentage	3P%	3-point field goal percentage	FT%	Free throw percentage
RPG	Rebounds per game	APG	Assists per game	SPG	Steals per game
BPG	Blocks per game	PPG	Points per game	**Bold**	Career high

=== NBA ===
==== Regular season ====
Year	Team	GP	GS	MPG	FG%	3P%	FT%	RPG	APG	SPG	BPG	PPG
2024–25	Golden State	42	14	16.3	**.449**	**.408**	.778	3.5	1.3	.4	.4	**8.1**
2025–26	Golden State	**67**	**35**	**17.3**	.440	.336	**.791**	**4.0**	**1.4**	.4	**.5**	7.7
Career		109	49	16.9	.443	.364	.786	3.8	1.4	.4	.5	7.8

==== Playoffs ====
Year	Team	GP	GS	MPG	FG%	3P%	FT%	RPG	APG	SPG	BPG	PPG
2025	Golden State	12	2	12.2	.333	.313	.750	2.3	1.0	.3	.3	3.8
Career		12	2	12.2	.333	.313	.750	2.3	1.0	.3	.3	3.8

=== College ===
Year	Team	GP	GS	MPG	FG%	3P%	FT%	RPG	APG	SPG	BPG	PPG
2019–20	Mississippi State	8	0	2.6	.375	.333	**1.000**	1.5	.1	.0	.1	1.1
2020–21	Mississippi State	31	0	8.7	.415	.250	.571	2.1	.4	.3	.5	2.8
2021–22	Boston College	31	11	21.4	.502	.344	.721	5.4	.7	.6	1.0	9.4
2022–23	Boston College	19	13	25.7	**.539**	.426	.860	5.6	1.5	.2	.9	15.1
2023–24	Boston College	**35**	**35**	**31.9**	.514	**.431**	.821	**8.1**	**2.9**	**.9**	**1.7**	**17.0**
Career		124	59	20.6	.507	.388	.790	5.1	1.3	.5	1.0	10.2

== See also ==
- List of All-Atlantic Coast Conference men's basketball teams
