= 2024–25 Golden State Warriors season =

- Head coach: Steve Kerr
- General manager: Mike Dunleavy Jr.
- Owners: Joe Lacob; Peter Guber
- Arena: Chase Center

Results
- Record: 48–34 (.585)
- Place: Division: 3rd (Pacific); Conference: 7th (Western)
- Playoff finish: Conference semifinals (lost to Timberwolves 1–4)
- Stats at Basketball Reference

Local media
- Television: NBC Sports Bay Area
- Radio: 95.7 The Game

The 2024–25 Golden State Warriors season was the 79th season of the franchise in the National Basketball Association (NBA), their 63rd in the San Francisco Bay Area, and their sixth season at the Chase Center. This was the first time since the 2010–11 season that franchise mainstay Klay Thompson wasn't on the club's opening night roster, as he left to join the Dallas Mavericks over the off-season through a sign-and-trade deal. The team also hosted the 2025 NBA All-Star Game at the Chase Center.

The Warriors started the season hot, going 12–3 in their first 15 games. However, they suddenly had a collapse, losing 4 consecutive games to end November, plus 2 three-game losing skids to end December, only winning 4 out of their 13 games. Despite that, the Warriors advanced to the 2024 NBA Cup knockout stage as the winner of West Group C. They finished the group stage with a 3–1 record, winning the tiebreaker over the Dallas Mavericks by virtue of their head-to-head win on November 12. However, they were eliminated by the Houston Rockets in the quarterfinals of the knockout stage.

On February 5, the Warriors and the Miami Heat agreed on a five-team trade to acquire Jimmy Butler from Miami in exchange for Andrew Wiggins, Kyle Anderson and a first round pick, while Dennis Schröder and Lindy Waters III, along with a second round pick were sent to the Detroit Pistons. The Warriors managed to improve their record from the previous year on April 8 with a win over the Phoenix Suns, eventually finishing 7th in the West with a 48–34 record.

On April 13, the Warriors clinched their second consecutive play-in berth following a loss to the Los Angeles Clippers. On April 15, the Warriors clinched a playoff berth for the first time since 2023 following a win over the Memphis Grizzlies in the first stage of the play-in tournament. As the seventh seed, the Warriors faced off against the second-seeded Houston Rockets in the first round of the playoffs. The Warriors took an early 3–1 series lead, but the Rockets won the next two games to force a game 7. The Warriors won game 7, clinching an appearance in the conference semifinals where they lost Stephen Curry to an injury. They would win game one, but then lose to the sixth-seeded Minnesota Timberwolves in five games.

The Golden State Warriors drew an average home attendance of 18,061, the 15th-highest of all NBA teams.

== Draft ==
Round	Pick	Player	Position	Nationality	School / club team
2	52	Quinten Post	C	Netherlands	Boston College (Sr.)

The Warriors entered this draft (which was two days long instead of just one day long like it previously has been since the NBA draft was shortened down to two rounds in 1989) with just one second-round pick, which was originally owned by the Milwaukee Bucks. The second-round pick was acquired from the Indiana Pacers as the least favorable pick in a six-team hierarchy after Milwaukee finished the previous season with the best record among them. The team had previously traded its original first-round pick to the Memphis Grizzlies (conveyed to the Portland Trail Blazers as it landed outside the Top 4 following the draft lottery) as well as its original second-round pick to the Atlanta Hawks (conveyed to the Houston Rockets as it landed outside the 56th-to-60th range).

Near the end of the second day of the draft, the Warriors selected the Dutch-born center Quinten Post from Boston College.

== Roster ==
2024–25 Golden State Warriors roster
Players

Pos.	No.	Player	Height	Weight	DOB	From
G	1	Taran Armstrong (TW)	6 ft 5 in (1.96 m)	190 lb (86 kg)	2002-01-15	Cal Baptist
F	10	Jimmy Butler	6 ft 7 in (2.01 m)	230 lb (104 kg)	1989-09-14	Marquette
G	30	Stephen Curry	6 ft 2 in (1.88 m)	185 lb (84 kg)	1988-03-14	Davidson
F	23	Draymond Green	6 ft 6 in (1.98 m)	230 lb (104 kg)	1990-03-04	Michigan State
G	7	Buddy Hield	6 ft 4 in (1.93 m)	220 lb (100 kg)	1992-12-17	Oklahoma
F/C	32	Trayce Jackson-Davis	6 ft 9 in (2.06 m)	245 lb (111 kg)	2000-02-22	Indiana
F	12	Braxton Key	6 ft 8 in (2.03 m)	225 lb (102 kg)	1997-02-14	Virginia
F	31	Kevin Knox II	6 ft 8 in (2.03 m)	215 lb (98 kg)	1999-08-11	Kentucky
F	00	Jonathan Kuminga	6 ft 7 in (2.01 m)	225 lb (102 kg)	2002-10-06	The Patrick School (NJ)
F/C	5	Kevon Looney	6 ft 9 in (2.06 m)	222 lb (101 kg)	1996-02-06	UCLA
G	4	Moses Moody	6 ft 5 in (1.96 m)	211 lb (96 kg)	2002-05-31	Arkansas
G	0	Gary Payton II	6 ft 2 in (1.88 m)	195 lb (88 kg)	1992-12-01	Oregon State
G	2	Brandin Podziemski	6 ft 4 in (1.93 m)	205 lb (93 kg)	2003-02-25	Santa Clara
C	21	Quinten Post	7 ft 0 in (2.13 m)	238 lb (108 kg)	2000-03-21	Boston College
F	44	Jackson Rowe (TW)	6 ft 7 in (2.01 m)	210 lb (95 kg)	1997-01-04	Cal State Fullerton
G/F	15	Gui Santos	6 ft 6 in (1.98 m)	185 lb (84 kg)	2002-06-22	Brazil
G	61	Pat Spencer	6 ft 3 in (1.91 m)	205 lb (93 kg)	1996-07-04	Northwestern

Coaches
Head coach
- Steve Kerr
Assistant(s)
- Ron Adams
- Chris DeMarco
- Bruce Fraser
- Khalid Robinson
- Jacob Rubin
- Jerry Stackhouse
- Terry Stotts
- Anthony Vereen
- Kris Weems

Legend
- (DP) Unsigned draft pick
- (FA) Free agent
- (S) Suspended
- (GL) On assignment to G League affiliate
- (TW) Two-way affiliate player
- Injured

Roster
Updated: April 13, 2025

== Standings ==
=== Division ===
Pacific Division	W	L	PCT	GB	Home	Road	Div	GP
y – Los Angeles Lakers	50	32	.610	–	31‍–‍10	19‍–‍22	12‍–‍4	82
x – Los Angeles Clippers	50	32	.610	–	30‍–‍11	20‍–‍21	9‍–‍7	82
x – Golden State Warriors	48	34	.585	2.0	24‍–‍17	24‍–‍17	5‍–‍11	82
pi – Sacramento Kings	40	42	.488	10.0	20‍–‍21	20‍–‍21	5‍–‍11	82
Phoenix Suns	36	46	.439	14.0	24‍–‍17	12‍–‍29	9‍–‍7	82

=== Conference ===
Western Conference
#	Team	W	L	PCT	GB	GP
1	z – Oklahoma City Thunder *	68	14	.829	–	82
2	y – Houston Rockets *	52	30	.634	16.0	82
3	y – Los Angeles Lakers *	50	32	.610	18.0	82
4	x – Denver Nuggets	50	32	.610	18.0	82
5	x – Los Angeles Clippers	50	32	.610	18.0	82
6	x – Minnesota Timberwolves	49	33	.598	19.0	82
7	x – Golden State Warriors	48	34	.585	20.0	82
8	x – Memphis Grizzlies	48	34	.585	20.0	82
9	pi – Sacramento Kings	40	42	.488	28.0	82
10	pi – Dallas Mavericks	39	43	.476	29.0	82
11	Phoenix Suns	36	46	.439	32.0	82
12	Portland Trail Blazers	36	46	.439	32.0	82
13	San Antonio Spurs	34	48	.415	34.0	82
14	New Orleans Pelicans	21	61	.256	47.0	82
15	Utah Jazz	17	65	.207	51.0	82

== Game log ==
=== Preseason ===
2024 preseason game log
Total: 6–0 (Home: 3–0; Road: 3–0)
Preseason: 6–0 (home: 3–0; road: 3–0)

Game	Date	Team	Score	High points	High rebounds	High assists	Location Attendance	Record
1	October 5	@ L.A. Clippers	W 91–90	Lindy Waters III (15)	Jonathan Kuminga (7)	Brandin Podziemski (4)	Stan Sheriff Center; 10,300	1–0
2	October 9	@ Sacramento	W 122–112	Buddy Hield (22)	Trayce Jackson-Davis (6)	Brandin Podziemski (8)	Golden 1 Center; 17,889	2–0
3	October 11	Sacramento	W 109–106	Moses Moody (23)	Jonathan Kuminga (7)	Stephen Curry (4)	Chase Center; 18,064	3–0
4	October 13	Detroit	W 111–93	Moses Moody (14)	Trayce Jackson-Davis (10)	De'Anthony Melton (7)	Chase Center; 18,064	4–0
5	October 15	@ L.A. Lakers	W 111–97	Moses Moody (21)	Green, Jackson-Davis (10)	Curry, Looney (6)	T-Mobile Arena; 16,907	5–0
6	October 18	L.A. Lakers	W 132–74	Jonathan Kuminga (17)	Green, Hield, Kuminga, Moody, Podziemski (4)	Anderson, Green, Jackson-Davis, Melton (5)	Chase Center; 18,064	6–0

2024–25 season schedule

Notably, the Warriors were the only team to go undefeated in the 2024-25 preseason.

=== Regular season ===
2024–25 game log
Total: 48–34 (Home: 24–17; Road: 24–17)
October: 4–1 (home: 2–1; road: 2–0)

Game	Date	Team	Score	High points	High rebounds	High assists	Location Attendance	Record
1	October 23	@ Portland	W 140–104	Buddy Hield (22)	Stephen Curry (9)	Stephen Curry (10)	Moda Center; 19,480	1–0
2	October 25	@ Utah	W 127–86	Buddy Hield (27)	Andrew Wiggins (13)	Buddy Hield (6)	Delta Center; 18,175	2–0
3	October 27	L.A. Clippers	L 104–112	Andrew Wiggins (29)	Kevon Looney (11)	Stephen Curry (6)	Chase Center; 18,064	2–1
4	October 29	New Orleans	W 124–106	Buddy Hield (28)	Kevon Looney (9)	Draymond Green (7)	Chase Center; 18,064	3–1
5	October 30	New Orleans	W 104–89	Buddy Hield (21)	Trayce Jackson-Davis (9)	Brandin Podziemski (7)	Chase Center; 18,064	4–1

November: 8–6 (home: 3–2; road: 5–4)

Game	Date	Team	Score	High points	High rebounds	High assists	Location Attendance	Record
6	November 2	@ Houston	W 127–121 (OT)	Buddy Hield (27)	Draymond Green (11)	Brandin Podziemski (6)	Toyota Center; 18,055	5–1
7	November 4	@ Washington	W 125–112	Stephen Curry (24)	Kevon Looney (10)	Stephen Curry (6)	Capital One Arena; 15,674	6–1
8	November 6	@ Boston	W 118–112	Stephen Curry (27)	Kevon Looney (10)	Stephen Curry (9)	TD Garden; 19,156	7–1
9	November 8	@ Cleveland	L 117–136	Jonathan Kuminga (21)	Looney, Podziemski (7)	Draymond Green (6)	Rocket Mortgage FieldHouse; 19,432	7–2
10	November 10	@ Oklahoma City	W 127–116	Stephen Curry (36)	De'Anthony Melton (10)	Draymond Green (11)	Paycom Center; 18,203	8–2
11	November 12	Dallas	W 120–117	Stephen Curry (37)	Kevon Looney (11)	Stephen Curry (9)	Chase Center; 18,064	9–2
12	November 15	Memphis	W 123–118	Buddy Hield (18)	Curry, Green (8)	Draymond Green (7)	Chase Center; 18,064	10–2
13	November 18	@ L.A. Clippers	L 99–102	Stephen Curry (26)	Draymond Green (9)	Draymond Green (7)	Intuit Dome; 17,927	10–3
14	November 20	Atlanta	W 120–97	Andrew Wiggins (27)	Trayce Jackson-Davis (11)	Draymond Green (9)	Chase Center; 18,064	11–3
15	November 22	@ New Orleans	W 112–108	Andrew Wiggins (30)	Green, Jackson-Davis (8)	Stephen Curry (7)	Smoothie King Center; 16,820	12–3
16	November 23	@ San Antonio	L 94–104	Andrew Wiggins (20)	Trayce Jackson-Davis (8)	Draymond Green (8)	Frost Bank Center; 18,847	12–4
17	November 25	Brooklyn	L 120–128	Stephen Curry (28)	Gary Payton II (9)	Curry, Green (7)	Chase Center; 18,064	12–5
18	November 27	Oklahoma City	L 101–105	Jonathan Kuminga (19)	Draymond Green (14)	Draymond Green (6)	Chase Center; 18,064	12–6
19	November 30	@ Phoenix	L 105–113	Stephen Curry (23)	Curry, Podziemski (7)	Draymond Green (7)	Footprint Center; 17,071	12–7

December: 4–9 (home: 3–5; road: 1–4)

Game	Date	Team	Score	High points	High rebounds	High assists	Location Attendance	Record
20	December 3	@ Denver	L 115–119	Stephen Curry (24)	Kevon Looney (11)	Stephen Curry (11)	Ball Arena; 19,912	12–8
21	December 5	Houston	W 99–93	Jonathan Kuminga (33)	Looney, Podziemski (11)	Looney, Podziemski (3)	Chase Center; 18,064	13–8
22	December 6	Minnesota	L 90–107	Stephen Curry (23)	Draymond Green (9)	Draymond Green (6)	Chase Center; 18,064	13–9
23	December 8	Minnesota	W 114–106	Stephen Curry (30)	Kevon Looney (9)	Stephen Curry (8)	Chase Center; 18,064	14–9
24	December 11	@ Houston	L 90–91	Jonathan Kuminga (20)	Kuminga, Looney, Payton II (7)	Stephen Curry (5)	Toyota Center; 18,055	14–10
25	December 15	Dallas	L 133–143	Andrew Wiggins (29)	Draymond Green (7)	Stephen Curry (10)	Chase Center; 18,064	14–11
26	December 19	@ Memphis	L 93–144	Brandin Podziemski (21)	Trayce Jackson-Davis (7)	Brandin Podziemski (6)	FedExForum; 17,729	14–12
27	December 21	@ Minnesota	W 113–103	Stephen Curry (31)	Trayce Jackson-Davis (9)	Stephen Curry (10)	Target Center; 18,978	15–12
28	December 23	Indiana	L 105–111	Jonathan Kuminga (26)	Jackson-Davis, Kuminga (8)	Stephen Curry (7)	Chase Center; 18,064	15–13
29	December 25	L.A. Lakers	L 113–115	Stephen Curry (38)	Andrew Wiggins (12)	Curry, Green (6)	Chase Center; 18,064	15–14
30	December 27	@ L.A. Clippers	L 92–102	Jonathan Kuminga (34)	Jonathan Kuminga (10)	Kuminga, Podziemski, Schröder (5)	Intuit Dome; 17,927	15–15
31	December 28	Phoenix	W 109–105	Jonathan Kuminga (34)	Trayce Jackson-Davis (10)	Draymond Green (7)	Chase Center; 18,064	16–15
32	December 30	Cleveland	L 95–113	Moses Moody (19)	Trayce Jackson-Davis (16)	Draymond Green (5)	Chase Center; 18,064	16–16

January: 8–8 (home: 6–5; road: 2–3)

Game	Date	Team	Score	High points	High rebounds	High assists	Location Attendance	Record
33	January 2	Philadelphia	W 139–105	Stephen Curry (30)	Andrew Wiggins (7)	Stephen Curry (10)	Chase Center; 18,064	17–16
34	January 4	Memphis	W 121–113	Andrew Wiggins (24)	Trayce Jackson-Davis (9)	Dennis Schröder (9)	Chase Center; 18,064	18–16
35	January 5	Sacramento	L 99–129	Stephen Curry (26)	Stephen Curry (7)	Green, Spencer (4)	Chase Center; 18,064	18–17
36	January 7	Miami	L 98–114	Stephen Curry (31)	Draymond Green (10)	Draymond Green (10)	Chase Center; 18,064	18–18
37	January 9	@ Detroit	W 107–104	Buddy Hield (19)	Trayce Jackson-Davis (10)	Curry, Schröder (6)	Little Caesars Arena; 20,062	19–18
38	January 10	@ Indiana	L 96–108	Hield, Spencer (17)	Trayce Jackson-Davis (10)	Anderson, Hield (5)	Gainbridge Fieldhouse; 17,274	19–19
39	January 13	@ Toronto	L 101–104	Stephen Curry (26)	Looney, Waters III (9)	Stephen Curry (7)	Scotiabank Arena; 19,165	19–20
40	January 15	@ Minnesota	W 116–115	Stephen Curry (31)	Trayce Jackson-Davis (15)	Stephen Curry (8)	Target Center; 18,978	20–20
41	January 18	Washington	W 122–114	Andrew Wiggins (31)	Trayce Jackson-Davis (15)	Stephen Curry (6)	Chase Center; 18,064	21–20
42	January 20	Boston	L 85–125	Stephen Curry (18)	Kevon Looney (7)	Moses Moody (5)	Chase Center; 18,064	21–21
43	January 22	@ Sacramento	L 117–123	Andrew Wiggins (25)	Trayce Jackson-Davis (8)	Stephen Curry (12)	Golden 1 Center; 17,832	21–22
44	January 23	Chicago	W 131–106	Stephen Curry (21)	Kevon Looney (11)	Curry, Schröder (7)	Chase Center; 18,064	22–22
45	January 25	L.A. Lakers	L 108–118	Andrew Wiggins (20)	Jackson-Davis, Payton II, Wiggins (6)	Stephen Curry (9)	Chase Center; 18,064	22–23
46	January 28	Utah	W 114–103	Dennis Schröder (23)	Kevon Looney (11)	Brandin Podziemski (6)	Chase Center; 18,064	23–23
47	January 29	Oklahoma City	W 116–109	Andrew Wiggins (27)	Gary Payton II (9)	Dennis Schröder (7)	Chase Center; 18,064	24–23
48	January 31	Phoenix	L 105–130	Moody, Wiggins (17)	Post, Wiggins (8)	Andrew Wiggins (6)	Chase Center; 18,064	24–24

February: 8–3 (home: 3–0; road: 5–3)

Game	Date	Team	Score	High points	High rebounds	High assists	Location Attendance	Record
49	February 3	Orlando	W 104–99	Andrew Wiggins (25)	Kevon Looney (15)	Kevon Looney (6)	Chase Center; 18,064	25–24
50	February 5	@ Utah	L 128–131	Stephen Curry (32)	Kevon Looney (10)	Draymond Green (9)	Delta Center; 18,175	25–25
51	February 6	@ L.A. Lakers	L 112–120	Stephen Curry (37)	Brandin Podziemski (8)	Brandin Podziemski (7)	Crypto.com Arena; 18,997	25–26
52	February 8	@ Chicago	W 132–111	Stephen Curry (34)	Gui Santos (8)	Green, Podziemski (7)	United Center; 21,297	26–26
53	February 10	@ Milwaukee	W 125–111	Stephen Curry (38)	Butler III, Podziemski (9)	Jimmy Butler III (6)	Fiserv Forum; 17,341	27–26
54	February 12	@ Dallas	L 107–111	Stephen Curry (25)	Jimmy Butler III (9)	Stephen Curry (8)	American Airlines Center; 20,311	27–27
55	February 13	@ Houston	W 105–98	Stephen Curry (27)	Kevon Looney (9)	Draymond Green (8)	Toyota Center; 18,055	28–27
All-Star Game • Chase Center
56	February 21	@ Sacramento	W 132–108	Hield, Moody (22)	Draymond Green (8)	Draymond Green (9)	Golden 1 Center; 18,098	29–27
57	February 23	Dallas	W 126–102	Stephen Curry (30)	Brandin Podziemski (13)	Stephen Curry (7)	Chase Center; 18,064	30–27
58	February 25	Charlotte	W 128–92	Buddy Hield (16)	Jimmy Butler III (8)	Curry, Green, Santos (6)	Chase Center; 18,064	31–27
59	February 27	@ Orlando	W 121–115	Stephen Curry (56)	Draymond Green (10)	Butler III, Podziemski (7)	Kia Center; 18,846	32–27

March: 11–4 (home: 6–1; road: 5–3)

Game	Date	Team	Score	High points	High rebounds	High assists	Location Attendance	Record
60	March 1	@ Philadelphia	L 119–126	Stephen Curry (29)	Quinten Post (9)	Stephen Curry (13)	Wells Fargo Center; 20,159	32–28
61	March 3	@ Charlotte	W 119–101	Buddy Hield (22)	Draymond Green (12)	Stephen Curry (10)	Spectrum Center; 19,223	33–28
62	March 4	@ New York	W 114–102	Stephen Curry (28)	Draymond Green (9)	Stephen Curry (9)	Madison Square Garden; 19,812	34–28
63	March 6	@ Brooklyn	W 121–119	Stephen Curry (40)	Gary Payton II (9)	Draymond Green (10)	Barclays Center; 18,413	35–28
64	March 8	Detroit	W 115–110	Stephen Curry (32)	Butler III, Green (9)	Draymond Green (7)	Chase Center; 18,064	36–28
65	March 10	Portland	W 130–120	Gary Payton II (26)	Jimmy Butler III (10)	Jimmy Butler III (10)	Chase Center; 18,064	37–28
66	March 13	Sacramento	W 130–104	Draymond Green (23)	Kevon Looney (6)	Jimmy Butler III (7)	Chase Center; 18,064	38–28
67	March 15	New York	W 97–94	Stephen Curry (28)	Curry, Santos (7)	Jimmy Butler III (7)	Chase Center; 18,064	39–28
68	March 17	Denver	L 105–114	Jimmy Butler III (23)	Jimmy Butler III (8)	Stephen Curry (7)	Chase Center; 18,064	39–29
69	March 18	Milwaukee	W 104–93	Jimmy Butler III (24)	Draymond Green (10)	Jimmy Butler III (10)	Chase Center; 18,064	40–29
70	March 20	Toronto	W 117–114	Draymond Green (21)	Jimmy Butler III (11)	Jimmy Butler III (12)	Chase Center; 18,064	41–29
71	March 22	@ Atlanta	L 115–124	Jimmy Butler III (25)	Brandin Podziemski (8)	Jimmy Butler III (8)	State Farm Arena; 17,864	41–30
72	March 25	@ Miami	L 86–112	Brandin Podziemski (14)	Gary Payton II (7)	Brandin Podziemski (4)	Kaseya Center; 19,897	41–31
73	March 28	@ New Orleans	W 111–95	Stephen Curry (23)	Jimmy Butler III (10)	Curry, Green (6)	Smoothie King Center; 18,133	42–31
74	March 30	@ San Antonio	W 148–106	Brandin Podziemski (27)	Kevon Looney (7)	Jimmy Butler III (8)	Frost Bank Center; 18,558	43–31

April: 5–3 (home: 1–3; road: 4–0)

Game	Date	Team	Score	High points	High rebounds	High assists	Location Attendance	Record
75	April 1	@ Memphis	W 134–125	Stephen Curry (52)	Curry, Green (10)	Draymond Green (12)	FedExForum; 17,794	44–31
76	April 3	@ L.A. Lakers	W 123–116	Stephen Curry (37)	Draymond Green (11)	Curry, Podziemski (6)	Crypto.com Arena; 18,997	45–31
77	April 4	Denver	W 118–104	Stephen Curry (36)	Brandin Podziemski (8)	Brandin Podziemski (6)	Chase Center; 18,064	46–31
78	April 6	Houston	L 96–106	Buddy Hield (20)	Kevon Looney (11)	Stephen Curry (8)	Chase Center; 18,064	46–32
79	April 8	@ Phoenix	W 133–95	Stephen Curry (25)	Curry, Santos (9)	Stephen Curry (6)	PHX Arena; 17,071	47–32
80	April 9	San Antonio	L 111–114	Stephen Curry (30)	Draymond Green (9)	Draymond Green (8)	Chase Center; 18,064	47–33
81	April 11	@ Portland	W 103–86	Jimmy Butler III (24)	Green, Podziemski (7)	Jimmy Butler III (7)	Moda Center; 19,335	48–33
82	April 13	L.A. Clippers	L 119–124 (OT)	Stephen Curry (36)	Brandin Podziemski (7)	Jimmy Butler III (9)	Chase Center; 18,864	48–34

2024–25 season schedule

=== Play-in ===
2025 play-in game log
Total: 1–0 (Home: 1–0; Road: 0–0)
Play-in: 1–0 (home: 1–0; road: 0–0)

Game	Date	Team	Score	High points	High rebounds	High assists	Location Attendance	Record
1	April 15	Memphis	W 121–116	Jimmy Butler III (38)	Stephen Curry (8)	Draymond Green (10)	Chase Center; 18,064	1–0

2024–25 season schedule

=== Playoffs ===
2025 playoff game log
Total: 5–7 (home: 2–3; road: 3–4)
First Round: 4–3 (home: 2–1; road: 2–2)

Game	Date	Team	Score	High points	High rebounds	High assists	Location Attendance	Series
1	April 20	@ Houston	W 95–85	Stephen Curry (31)	Brandin Podziemski (8)	Jimmy Butler III (6)	Toyota Center; 18,055	1–0
2	April 23	@ Houston	L 94–109	Stephen Curry (20)	Curry, Green (5)	Stephen Curry (9)	Toyota Center; 18,055	1–1
3	April 26	Houston	W 104–93	Stephen Curry (36)	Quinten Post (12)	Stephen Curry (9)	Chase Center; 18,064	2–1
4	April 28	Houston	W 109–106	Jimmy Butler III (27)	Draymond Green (8)	Jimmy Butler III (6)	Chase Center; 18,064	3–1
5	April 30	@ Houston	L 116–131	Moses Moody (25)	Moses Moody (9)	Stephen Curry (7)	Toyota Center; 18,055	3–2
6	May 2	Houston	L 107–115	Stephen Curry (29)	Jimmy Butler III (9)	Jimmy Butler III (8)	Chase Center; 18,064	3–3
7	May 4	@ Houston	W 103–89	Buddy Hield (33)	Stephen Curry (10)	Butler III, Curry (7)	Toyota Center; 18,055	4–3

Conference Semifinals: 1–4 (home: 0–2; road: 1–2)

Game	Date	Team	Score	High points	High rebounds	High assists	Location Attendance	Series
1	May 6	@ Minnesota	W 99–88	Buddy Hield (24)	Jimmy Butler III (11)	Jimmy Butler III (8)	Target Center; 19,223	1–0
2	May 8	@ Minnesota	L 93–117	Jonathan Kuminga (18)	Jimmy Butler III (7)	Brandin Podziemski (6)	Target Center; 18,978	1–1
3	May 10	Minnesota	L 97–102	Jimmy Butler III (33)	Brandin Podziemski (8)	Jimmy Butler III (7)	Chase Center; 18,064	1–2
4	May 12	Minnesota	L 110–117	Jonathan Kuminga (23)	Kevon Looney (8)	Butler III, Moody (3)	Chase Center; 18,064	1–3
5	May 14	@ Minnesota	L 110–121	Brandin Podziemski (28)	three players (6)	Butler III, Green (6)	Target Center; 19,395	1–4

2025 playoff schedule

=== NBA Cup ===
The groups were revealed during the tournament announcement on July 12, 2024.

==== West Group C ====
Pos	Team	Pld	W	L	PF	PA	PD	Qualification
1	Golden State Warriors	4	3	1	470	462	+8	Advance to knockout stage
2	Dallas Mavericks	4	3	1	493	447	+46	Advance to knockout stage
3	Denver Nuggets	4	2	2	455	449	+6	
4	Memphis Grizzlies	4	1	3	464	475	−11	
5	New Orleans Pelicans	4	1	3	409	458	−49	

Source: NBA
Rules for classification: Tiebreakers

== Player statistics ==
Legend
GP	Games played	GS	Games started	MPG	Minutes per game
FG%	Field-goal percentage	3P%	3-point field-goal percentage	FT%	Free-throw percentage
RPG	Rebounds per game	APG	Assists per game	SPG	Steals per game
BPG	Blocks per game	PPG	Points per game

=== Regular season ===
Golden State Warriors statistics
Player	GP	GS	MPG	FG%	3P%	FT%	RPG	APG	SPG	BPG	PPG
Kyle Anderson^{†}	36	3	15.0	.450	.365	.667	3.1	2.3	.7	.6	5.3
Reece Beekman^{†}	2	0	2.0	1.000	–	–	.5	.5	.5	.0	1.0
Jimmy Butler III^{†}	30	30	32.7	.476	.279	.870	5.5	5.9	1.7	.3	17.9
Yuri Collins	2	0	8.0	.333	–	–	1.5	2.0	1.0	.0	1.0
Stephen Curry	70	70	32.2	.448	.397	.933	4.4	6.0	1.1	.4	24.5
Draymond Green	68	66	29.2	.424	.325	.687	6.1	5.6	1.5	1.0	9.0
Buddy Hield	82	22	22.7	.417	.370	.828	3.2	1.6	.8	.3	11.1
Trayce Jackson-Davis	62	37	15.6	.576	.000	.578	5.0	1.7	.4	.6	6.6
Braxton Key	3	0	3.7	.000	.000	.500	.7	.0	.7	.0	1.0
Kevin Knox II	14	0	6.0	.500	.267	.750	1.2	.4	.1	.3	3.3
Jonathan Kuminga	47	10	24.3	.454	.305	.668	4.6	2.2	.8	.4	15.3
Kevon Looney	76	6	15.0	.514	.400	.566	6.1	1.6	.6	.5	4.5
De'Anthony Melton	6	2	20.2	.407	.371	.625	3.3	2.8	1.2	.3	10.3
Moses Moody	74	34	22.3	.433	.374	.797	2.6	1.3	.8	.4	9.8
Gary Payton II	62	11	15.0	.574	.326	.711	3.0	1.3	.8	.3	6.5
Brandin Podziemski	64	33	26.8	.445	.372	.758	5.1	3.4	1.1	.2	11.7
Quinten Post	42	14	16.3	.449	.408	.778	3.5	1.3	.4	.4	8.1
Jackson Rowe	6	0	8.7	.471	.300	.500	1.8	.7	.7	.0	3.7
Gui Santos	56	2	13.6	.458	.330	.690	3.1	1.4	.4	.2	4.1
Dennis Schröder^{†}	24	18	26.2	.375	.322	.744	2.3	4.4	1.0	.1	10.6
Pat Spencer	39	0	6.4	.406	.227	.733	1.2	1.2	.4	.1	2.5
Lindy Waters III^{†}	38	9	17.2	.371	.331	.727	2.5	1.1	.6	.3	5.5
Andrew Wiggins^{†}	43	43	30.1	.444	.379	.777	4.6	2.4	.9	.8	17.6

- ^{†} Denotes player spent time with another team in the season. Stats reflect time with the Warriors only.

=== Playoffs ===
Golden State Warriors statistics
Player	GP	GS	MPG	FG%	3P%	FT%	RPG	APG	SPG	BPG	PPG
Jimmy Butler III^{†}	11	11	36.1	.447	.306	.800	6.6	5.2	1.3	.3	19.2
Stephen Curry	8	8	35.1	.477	.400	.893	5.3	5.1	1.0	.8	22.6
Draymond Green	12	12	32.4	.389	.267	.692	5.5	3.8	1.4	.9	9.1
Buddy Hield	12	9	27.3	.416	.429	.929	3.5	1.8	1.2	.4	12.5
Trayce Jackson-Davis	9	3	8.9	.889	–	.385	2.3	.2	.3	.2	4.1
Braxton Key	5	0	4.6	.125	.000	–	1.8	.2	.4	.4	.4
Kevin Knox II	5	0	7.6	.400	.167	.800	1.4	.8	.0	.2	4.2
Jonathan Kuminga	8	1	23.4	.484	.400	.710	2.5	1.3	.5	.5	15.3
Kevon Looney	12	0	10.0	.435	–	.750	3.6	.3	.4	.3	2.2
Moses Moody	12	2	16.1	.350	.333	.824	2.2	1.2	.5	.3	7.1
Gary Payton II	11	1	16.4	.447	.391	–	2.2	1.5	.9	.0	4.6
Brandin Podziemski	12	11	32.1	.364	.328	.708	5.0	3.1	1.3	.2	11.3
Quinten Post	12	2	12.2	.333	.313	.750	2.3	1.0	.3	.3	3.8
Gui Santos	10	0	7.2	.529	.400	.667	1.2	.8	.3	.1	2.6
Pat Spencer	8	0	7.9	.640	.333	1.000	1.4	.8	.4	.0	4.5

== Transactions ==
=== Trades ===
June 27, 2024
To Golden State Warriors

- (United States) Lindy Waters III
To Oklahoma City Thunder

- Draft rights to (Netherlands) Quinten Post (No. 52) (Note: Post was drafted by Golden State, which traded his rights to Oklahoma City, which traded them to Portland. Portland sold the rights back to Golden State after the July moratorium ended.)
July 6, 2024
To Golden State Warriors

- Draft rights to (Netherlands) Quinten Post (No. 52)
To Portland Trail Blazers

- Cash considerations
July 6, 2024
Six-team trade
To Golden State Warriors

- (China) Kyle Anderson (from Minnesota)
- (The Bahamas) Buddy Hield (from Philadelphia)
To Charlotte Hornets

- (Australia) Josh Green (from Dallas)
- (United States) Reggie Jackson (from Denver)
- 2029 DEN second-round pick (from Denver)
- 2030 DEN second-round pick (from Denver)
To Dallas Mavericks

- (United States) Klay Thompson (from Golden State)
- 2025 GSW second-round pick (Note: As part of the trade, Charlotte sent Philadelphia's pick to Denver, which then sent the more favorable of Philadelphia's pick and its own pick to Dallas and the less favorable of the two to Minnesota.) (from Golden State)
To Denver Nuggets

- Cash considerations (from Charlotte)
To Minnesota Timberwolves

- 2025 DEN second-round pick (from Golden State via Charlotte)
- 2031 second-round pick swap (from Golden State)
- Cash considerations (from Golden State)
To Philadelphia 76ers

- 2031 DAL second-round pick (from Golden State via Dallas)
December 15, 2024
To Brooklyn Nets

- (United States) Reece Beekman (two-way contract)
- (United States) De'Anthony Melton
- 2026 ATL second-round pick
- 2028 ATL second-round pick
- 2029 GSW second-round pick
To Golden State Warriors

- (Germany) Dennis Schröder
- 2025 MIA protected second-round pick (Note: Golden State will receive the pick if it's No. 38–60.)
February 6, 2025

Five-team trade
To Golden State Warriors

- (United States) Jimmy Butler (from Miami)
To Detroit Pistons

- (Germany) Dennis Schröder (from Golden State)
- (United States) Lindy Waters III (from Golden State)
- 2031 second-round pick (Note: Minnesota has the right to swap picks with Golden State, then Golden State will send the pick it has to Detroit.) (from Golden State)
To Miami Heat

- (China) Kyle Anderson (from Golden State)
- (United States) Davion Mitchell (from Toronto)
- (Canada) Andrew Wiggins (from Golden State)
- 2025 GSW protected first-round pick (Note: Miami will receive the pick if it's No. 11–30; if not conveyed it will roll ever to 2026 (No. 11–30) and 2027 (unprotected).) (from Golden State)
To Toronto Raptors

- (United States) P. J. Tucker (from Utah)
- 2026 LAL second-round pick (from Miami)
- Cash considerations (from Miami)
To Utah Jazz

- (United States) KJ Martin (from Detroit)
- (United States) Josh Richardson (from Miami)
- 2028 second-round pick (from Detroit)
- 2031 second-round pick (Note: The more favorable of the picks originally belonging to Indiana and Miami.) (from Miami)
- Cash considerations (from Miami)

=== Free agency ===
==== Additions ====
Date	Player	Signed	Former team	Ref.
July 3, 2024	(United States) Reece Beekman	Two-way contract	Virginia Cavaliers (Undrafted)	
July 8, 2024	(United States) De'Anthony Melton	1-year, $12.8 million	Philadelphia 76ers	
July 16, 2024	(United States) Daeqwon Plowden	Two-way contract	Osceola Magic (NBA G League)	
January 28, 2025	(Canada) Jackson Rowe	Two-way contract	Santa Cruz Warriors (NBA G League)	
February 19, 2025	(United States) Yuri Collins	10-day contract	Santa Cruz Warriors (NBA G League)	
February 19, 2025	(United States) Kevin Knox II	10-day contract	Santa Cruz Warriors (NBA G League)	
February 25, 2025	(Australia) Taran Armstrong	Two-way contract	Cairns Taipans (Australia)	
March 1, 2025	(United States) Kevin Knox II	Second 10-day contract	Golden State Warriors	
March 4, 2025	(United States) Pat Spencer	Standard contract (Previously on a two-way contract)	Golden State Warriors / Santa Cruz Warriors (NBA G League)	
March 4, 2025	(United States) Braxton Key	Two-way contract	San Diego Clippers (NBA G League)	
March 22, 2025	(United States) Kevin Knox II	Signed for the rest of the season	Golden State Warriors	
April 13, 2025	(United States) Braxton Key	Standard contract (Previously on a two-way contract)	Golden State Warriors / Santa Cruz Warriors (NBA G League)	

==== Subtractions ====
Date	Player	Reason	New team	Ref.
June 30, 2024	(United States) Chris Paul	Waived	San Antonio Spurs	
July 3, 2024	(United States) Jerome Robinson	Free agency	Saint-Quentin (France)	
July 12, 2024	(Croatia) Dario Šarić	Free agency	Denver Nuggets	
August 20, 2024	(Spain) Usman Garuba	Free agency	Real Madrid (Spain)	
September 26, 2024	(Dominican Republic) Lester Quiñones	Free agency	Philadelphia 76ers	
September 27, 2024	(United States) Daeqwon Plowden	Waived	Atlanta Hawks	
