= Gary Payton II =

American basketball player (born 1992)

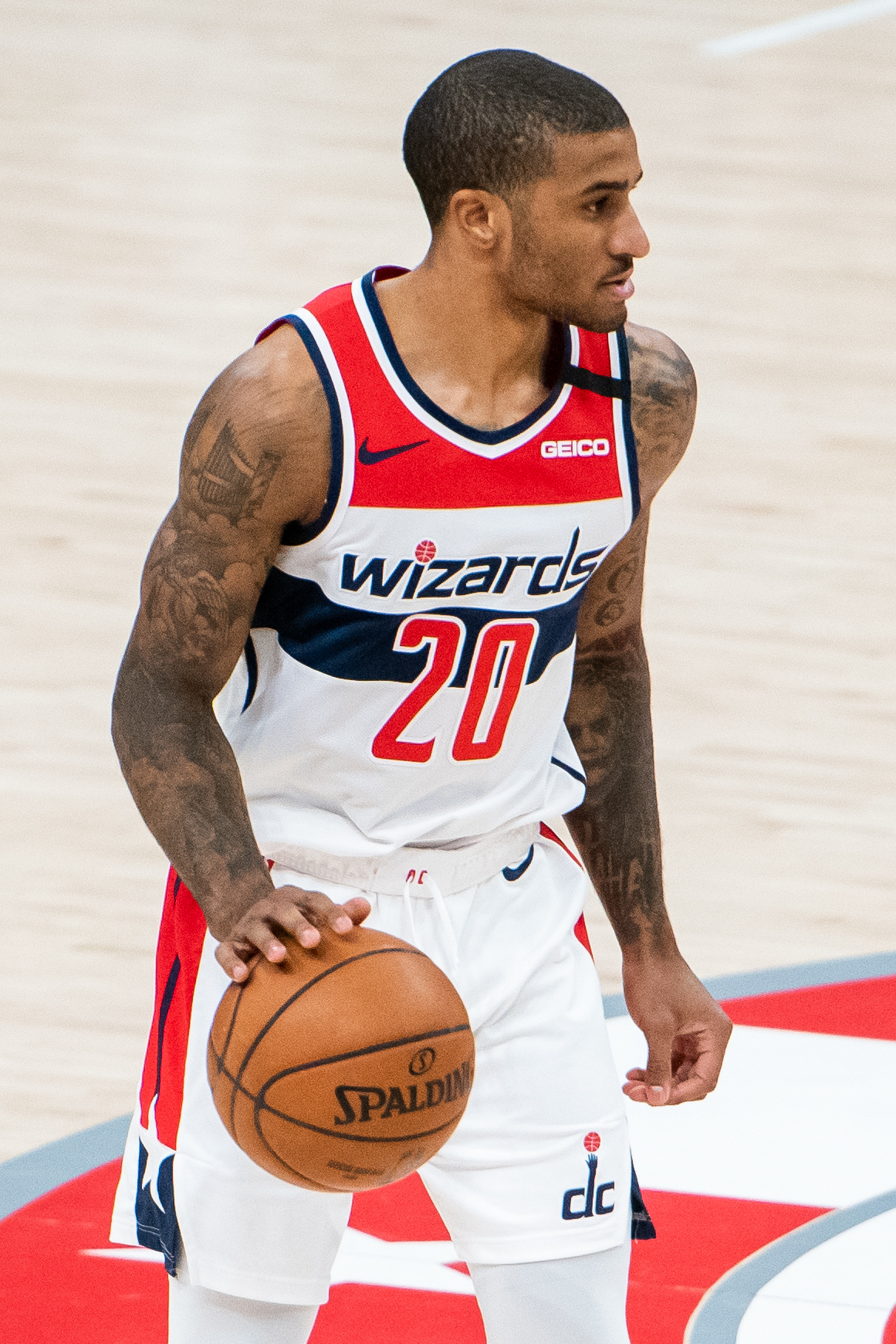
- Payton with the Washington Wizards in 2020

No. 0 – Golden State Warriors
- Position: Shooting guard
- League: NBA

Personal information
- Born: December 1, 1992 (age 33) Seattle, Washington, U.S.
- Listed height: 6 ft 2 in (1.88 m)
- Listed weight: 192 lb (87 kg)

Career information
- High school: Spring Valley (Las Vegas, Nevada); Westwind Prep (Phoenix, Arizona)
- College: Salt Lake CC (2012–2014); Oregon State (2014–2016)
- NBA draft: 2016: undrafted
- Playing career: 2016–present

Career history
- 2016–2017: Rio Grande Valley Vipers
- 2017: Milwaukee Bucks
- 2017: →Wisconsin Herd
- 2018: Los Angeles Lakers
- 2018: →South Bay Lakers
- 2018–2019: Rio Grande Valley Vipers
- 2019: Washington Wizards
- 2019: →Capital City Go-Go
- 2019: Rio Grande Valley Vipers
- 2019: South Bay Lakers
- 2019–2020: Washington Wizards
- 2021: Raptors 905
- 2021–2022: Golden State Warriors
- 2022–2023: Portland Trail Blazers
- 2023–present: Golden State Warriors

Career highlights
- NBA champion (2022); NBA G League champion (2019); NBA G League Defensive Player of the Year (2021); NBA G League All-Defensive Team (2021); NBA G League steals leader (2021); AP Honorable mention All-American (2016); 2× First-team All-Pac-12 (2015, 2016); 2× Pac-12 Defensive Player of the Year (2015, 2016); 2× Pac-12 All-Defensive Team (2015, 2016)
- Stats at NBA.com
- Stats at Basketball Reference

Gary Dwayne Payton II (born December 1, 1992) is an American professional basketball player for the Golden State Warriors of the National Basketball Association (NBA). As a junior and senior playing college basketball for the Oregon State Beavers, Payton was named first-team All-Pac-12 as well as Pac-12 Defensive Player of the Year. He won his first NBA championship with the Warriors in 2022.

Nicknamed "GP2" and "Young Glove", Payton is the son of Hall of Famer Gary Payton, known as "the Glove" in his playing days. He is also called "the Mitten", but personally prefers Young Glove.

== High school and college career ==
Payton was born in Seattle to Monique and Gary Payton, while his father was a member of the Seattle SuperSonics. He attended Spring Valley High School where he lettered two years in basketball and one year in swimming before graduating in 2011. He then enrolled at Westwind Preparatory Academy for the 2011–12 season.

=== Salt Lake Bruins ===
Payton played two seasons at Salt Lake Community College in Salt Lake City, Utah. He averaged 9.4 points, 6.2 rebounds, 3.7 assists, and 1.9 steals per game as a freshman (2012–13) and led the Bruins to a 29–5 overall record and 14–1 mark in the Scenic West Athletic Conference (SWAC), where they won the Region 18 Championship and outright SWAC title in 2013. Payton was named First Team All-SWAC and made Region 18 All-Tournament Team as a freshman. In his sophomore year, he averaged 14.1 points, 7.9 rebounds, 3.8 assists, and 1.9 steals per game, earning him Second Team NJCAA Division I All-American honors, and was voted 2014 Region 18 Co-Player of the Year and Region 18 Tournament Most Valuable Player. The Bruins finished with a 27–7 overall record and won their second consecutive Region 18 Championship.

=== Oregon State Beavers ===
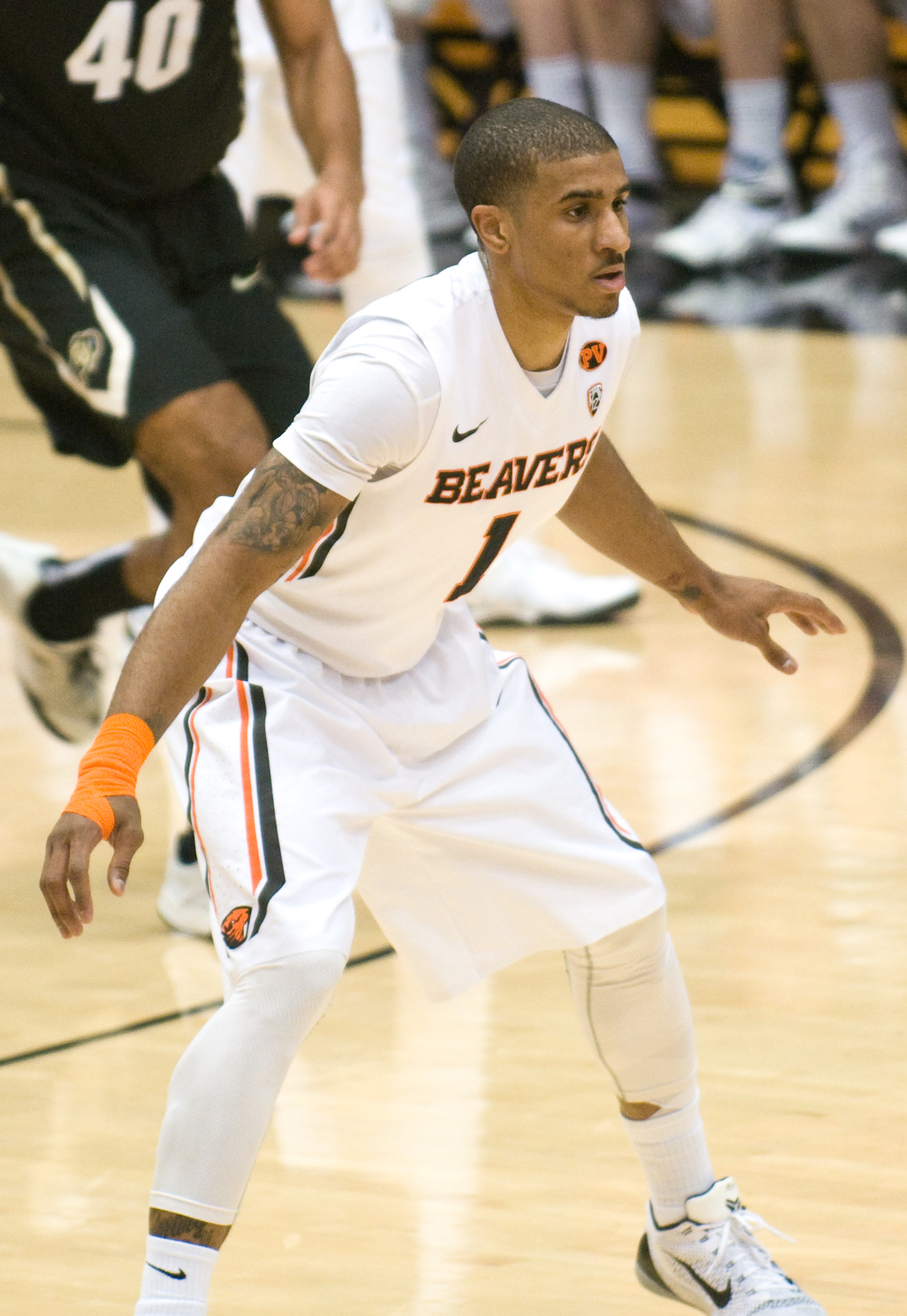
Payton with Oregon State in 2015

During Payton's sophomore season at Salt Lake CC he signed a letter of intent to play for his father's alma mater Oregon State under coach Craig Robinson. Robinson was fired before the start of the 2014–15 basketball season and was replaced by University of Montana head coach Wayne Tinkle. Having lost their top five scorers from the previous season, Pac-12 coaches picked Oregon State to finish 12th in the 2014–15 season. Instead, the up-tempo Beavers finished 7th with a 4–1 record against the conference's top three teams, Arizona, Oregon and Utah. In their game against Grambling State, Payton recorded 10 points, 12 rebounds and 10 assists, becoming only the second Beaver ever with a triple-double in a game. His father, Hall of Famer Gary Payton, is the other Beaver with a triple-double when he had 20 points, 14 rebounds and 11 assists against the University of Portland in 1988. Following a home sweep of the Los Angeles schools Payton was named the January 26, 2015 Pac-12 Conference Player of the Week. During his first season at Oregon State Payton led his team in multiple categories: scoring, rebounds, and steals. On March 9, 2015, Pac-12 coaches voted Payton to the All-Pac-12 First Team, All-Pac-12 Defensive Team and named him the Pac-12 Defensive Player of the Year.

On February 1, 2016, he was named one of 10 finalists for the Bob Cousy Award for top point guard of the year. He was named to the 35-man mid-season watchlist for the Naismith Player of the Year on February 11.

== Professional career ==
=== Rio Grande Valley Vipers (2016–2017) ===
After going undrafted in the 2016 NBA draft, Payton II joined the Houston Rockets for the 2016 NBA Summer League. On September 23, 2016, he signed with the Rockets, but was later waived on October 24 after appearing in six preseason games. On October 31, 2016, he was acquired by the Rio Grande Valley Vipers of the NBA Development League as an affiliate player of the Rockets. On December 3, 2016, he scored 51 points on 20-of-29 shooting to go with 11 rebounds in a 140–125 win over the Los Angeles D-Fenders.

=== Milwaukee Bucks (2017) ===
On April 2, 2017, Payton II signed with the Milwaukee Bucks. He made his debut for the Bucks that night, scoring five points in nine minutes off the bench in a 109–105 loss to the Dallas Mavericks. Payton II was waived on October 14 as one of the team's final 2017–18 preseason roster cuts. On October 17, 2017, Payton II was given a two-way contract with the Bucks via their NBA G League affiliate the Wisconsin Herd, meaning he would officially return to Milwaukee for the start of the season. Payton II would have his first start in the NBA on November 22, 2017, against the Phoenix Suns, playing as the starting small forward for the Bucks that night due to team injuries. While he would end the night early due to an injury of his own, the Bucks would win that night in overtime. On December 13, Payton II was waived from the Bucks in favor of Sean Kilpatrick.

=== Los Angeles Lakers (2018) ===
On January 15, 2018, the Los Angeles Lakers signed Payton II to a two-way contract. Throughout the rest of the season, he split his playing time between the Los Angeles Lakers and their NBA G League affiliate, the South Bay Lakers. On the final game of the season, Payton scored a career-high 25 points and also posted a career-high 12 rebounds against the Los Angeles Clippers. He was the last Laker to wear number #23 before LeBron James.

=== Return to the Vipers (2018–2019) ===
On September 4, 2018, Payton signed a training camp contract with the Portland Trail Blazers. On October 13, 2018, Payton was waived by the Trail Blazers.

On December 12, 2018, the Rio Grande Valley Vipers of the NBA G League announced via Twitter that they had re-acquired Payton.

=== Washington Wizards (2019) ===
On January 21, 2019, Payton signed with the Washington Wizards on a 10-day contract, and Payton made his debut for the Wizards on January 22 in a 101–87 win over the Detroit Pistons, but was not offered a second 10-day contract.

=== Third stint with the Vipers (2019) ===
On February 2, the Rio Grande Valley Vipers announced that they had reacquired Payton.

=== South Bay Lakers (2019) ===
On October 24, 2019, the Canton Charge acquired the returning right from Rio Grande Valley Vipers for Payton in exchange for Jaron Blossomgame. Two days later on October 26, 2019, Payton was traded to the South Bay Lakers for Sheldon Mac and Robert Heyer. Two days later on October 28, 2019, Payton was added to the training camp roster of the South Bay Lakers. On November 4, 2019, Payton was included in the opening night roster of the South Bay Lakers.

=== Return to Washington (2019–2020) ===
On December 23, 2019, Payton signed with the Washington Wizards. On July 9, 2020, he tested positive for COVID-19.

=== Raptors 905 (2021) ===
On January 11, 2021, Payton was selected 15th overall by the Raptors 905 in the NBA G League draft, where he averaged 10.8 points on 55.5 percent shooting from the field, 5.6 rebounds, 2.6 assists and 2.54 steals in 21.9 minutes per game. At the end of the shortened single-site season in Orlando, he was named the 2021 NBA G League Defensive Player of the Year.

=== Golden State Warriors (2021–2022) ===
On April 8, 2021, Payton signed a 10-day contract with the Golden State Warriors. On April 19, he signed a second 10-day contract and on May 16, he was signed for the rest of the season and the next season.

Payton was waived shortly before the start of the 2021–22 NBA season, but was re-signed by the Warriors on October 19 after he cleared waivers. Payton had a breakout season and started the first two games of the Western Conference semifinals against the Memphis Grizzlies. In Game 2, he fractured his left elbow when he went up for a fast-break layup but fell hard after the Grizzlies' Dillon Brooks chased him down and hit him in the head while he was in the air.

In Game 5 of the Finals, Payton posted 15 points, five rebounds and three steals in a 104–94 win over the Boston Celtics. The Warriors went on to win Game 6, where Payton played a major defensive role, and Payton won his first NBA championship. He and his father became the fifth father-son duo to win an NBA title, with one of the other pairs including Payton's teammate Klay Thompson and his father, Mychal.

=== Portland Trail Blazers (2022–2023) ===
On July 6, 2022, Payton signed a three-year, $28 million deal with the Portland Trail Blazers. He underwent offseason core muscle surgery, which sidelined him for months. On January 2, 2023, Payton made his Blazers debut, putting up seven points, four assists, two rebounds, and one steal in a 135–106 win over the Detroit Pistons.

=== Return to Golden State (2023–2026) ===
On February 9, 2023, Payton was traded back to the Golden State Warriors alongside two second-round picks in a four-team trade involving the Atlanta Hawks and Detroit Pistons, sending Kevin Knox II and five second-round picks to Portland, James Wiseman to Detroit and Saddiq Bey to Atlanta and made his debut on March 26, against the Minnesota Timberwolves. On March 6, 2024, Payton surpassed 1,000 career points against the Milwaukee Bucks in 125–90 victory.

On April 26, 2025, in the first round of the NBA playoffs, Payton scored a playoff career high of 16 points against the Houston Rockets, to help the Golden State Warriors take a 2-1 lead in the series.

On September 29, 2025, Payton re-signed with the Warriors.

On August 1, 2026, Payton re-signed with the Warriors.

== Personal life ==
On September 1, 2025, it was announced that Payton would be launching a professional skateboard league, with intentions to hold its inaugural season in 2026 in Big Bear, California.

== Career statistics ==
Legend
| GP | Games played | GS | Games started | MPG | Minutes per game |
| FG% | Field goal percentage | 3P% | 3-point field goal percentage | FT% | Free throw percentage |
| RPG | Rebounds per game | APG | Assists per game | SPG | Steals per game |
| BPG | Blocks per game | PPG | Points per game | **Bold** | Career high |
| † | Won an NBA championship |

=== NBA ===
==== Regular season ====
| Year | Team | GP | GS | MPG | FG% | 3P% | FT% | RPG | APG | SPG | BPG | PPG |
|---|---|---|---|---|---|---|---|---|---|---|---|---|
| 2016–17 | Milwaukee | 6 | 0 | 16.5 | .364 | .111 | .600 | 2.0 | **2.2** | .5 | **.7** | 3.3 |
| 2017–18 | Milwaukee | 12 | 6 | 8.8 | .394 | .167 | .667 | 1.4 | .8 | .3 | .1 | 2.5 |
| 2017–18 | L.A. Lakers | 11 | 0 | 10.5 | .415 | .308 | .167 | 2.5 | 1.1 | .4 | .2 | 3.5 |
| 2018–19 | Washington | 3 | 0 | 5.3 | .625 | .500 | — | .7 | 1.3 | 1.0 | .3 | 3.7 |
| 2019–20 | Washington | 29 | **17** | 14.9 | .414 | .283 | .500 | 2.8 | 1.7 | 1.1 | .2 | 3.9 |
| 2020–21 | Golden State | 10 | 0 | 4.0 | **.769** | .500 | .750 | 1.1 | .1 | .6 | .1 | 2.5 |
| 2021–22† | Golden State | 71 | 16 | **17.6** | .616 | .358 | .603 | 3.5 | .9 | **1.4** | .3 | 7.1 |
| 2022–23 | Portland | 15 | 1 | 17.0 | .585 | **.529** | **1.000** | 2.6 | 1.5 | 1.1 | .1 | 4.1 |
| 2022–23 | Golden State | 7 | 0 | 16.0 | .607 | .444 | .667 | **4.3** | 1.1 | .9 | .6 | 5.7 |
| 2023–24 | Golden State | 44 | 0 | 15.5 | .563 | .364 | .609 | 2.6 | 1.1 | .9 | .4 | 5.5 |
| 2024–25 | Golden State | 62 | 11 | 15.0 | .574 | .326 | .711 | 3.0 | 1.3 | .8 | .3 | 6.5 |
| 2025–26 | Golden State | **73** | 1 | 15.6 | .583 | .291 | .650 | 3.6 | 1.7 | .9 | .3 | **7.5** |
| Career | | 343 | 52 | 15.1 | .564 | .328 | .630 | 3.0 | 1.3 | 1.0 | .3 | 5.9 |

==== Playoffs ====
| Year | Team | GP | GS | MPG | FG% | 3P% | FT% | RPG | APG | SPG | BPG | PPG |
|---|---|---|---|---|---|---|---|---|---|---|---|---|
| 2022† | Golden State | **12** | 2 | **16.9** | .659 | **.533** | **.667** | 3.1 | 1.3 | **1.2** | **.6** | 6.5 |
| 2023 | Golden State | **12** | **3** | 16.0 | **.667** | .267 | **.667** | **3.7** | .8 | .7 | .5 | **6.8** |
| 2025 | Golden State | 11 | 1 | 16.4 | .447 | .391 | — | 2.2 | **1.5** | .9 | .0 | 4.6 |
| Career | | 35 | 6 | 16.4 | .593 | .396 | .667 | 3.0 | 1.2 | .9 | .4 | 6.0 |

=== College ===
| Year | Team | GP | GS | MPG | FG% | 3P% | FT% | RPG | APG | SPG | BPG | PPG |
|---|---|---|---|---|---|---|---|---|---|---|---|---|
| 2014–15 | Oregon State | 31 | 30 | **36.3** | .485 | .293 | **.663** | 7.5 | 3.2 | **3.1** | **1.2** | 13.4 |
| 2015–16 | Oregon State | **32** | **32** | 34.3 | **.486** | **.314** | .642 | **7.8** | **5.0** | 2.5 | .5 | **16.0** |
| Career | | 63 | 62 | 35.3 | .485 | .302 | .652 | 7.7 | 4.1 | 2.8 | .8 | 14.7 |

== Awards and honors ==
College

- 2× First-team All-Pac-12 (2015, 2016)
- 2x Pac-12 Defensive Player of the Year (2015, 2016)
- 2× Pac-12 All-Defensive Team (2015, 2016)
- Bob Cousy Award Finalist (2016)
- 2015 Pac-12 leader in steals per game (3.1)
- 2015 Pac-12 leader in total steals (95)
- 2016 Pac-12 leader in steals per game (2.5)
- 2016 Pac-12 leader in total steals (80)

NBA

- NBA champion (2022)
- NBA Community Assist Award (2021–22)

== See also ==
- List of second-generation National Basketball Association players
