= 2023–24 Golden State Warriors season =

- Head coach: Steve Kerr
- General manager: Mike Dunleavy Jr.
- Owners: Joe Lacob; Peter Guber
- Arena: Chase Center

Results
- Record: 46–36 (.561)
- Place: Division: 5th (Pacific); Conference: 10th (Western)
- Playoff finish: Did not qualify
- Stats at Basketball Reference

Local media
- Television: NBC Sports Bay Area
- Radio: 95.7 The Game

The 2023–24 Golden State Warriors season was the 78th season of the franchise in the National Basketball Association (NBA), their 62nd in the San Francisco Bay Area, and their fifth season at the Chase Center. This was the Warriors' tenth season with Steve Kerr as head coach and the first season since 2011–12 without general manager Bob Myers.

On November 14, against the Minnesota Timberwolves, an altercation broke out early in the game, which started between Klay Thompson and Jaden McDaniels. McDaniels grabbed Thompson, who eventually had his jersey ripped. In the ensuing scuffle, Draymond Green placed Rudy Gobert in a headlock. This resulted in Green, Thompson, and McDaniels all being ejected from the game. Green was suspended for five games and, along with Thompson, Gobert, and McDaniels, was fined for the incident. On December 12, Green struck Jusuf Nurkić in the face in a game against Phoenix Suns, which led to Green being suspended indefinitely the next day. While Green initially considered retirement at one point due to the suspension before being talked out of it by NBA commissioner Adam Silver, he was ultimately reinstated with the team on January 6, 2024, after he completed league-mandated counseling. However, he did not officially make his comeback to play with them until January 15, 2024, against the Memphis Grizzlies, making his suspension officially completed at 16 games.

On January 17, Dejan Milojević, an assistant coach for the Warriors who was also on the team during their most recent championship season at the time, died after suffering a heart attack during a team dinner meeting the previous day in Salt Lake City while preparing for an upcoming game against the Utah Jazz. Due to the sudden death, both the January 17 and 19 games against the Jazz and Dallas Mavericks were postponed and rescheduled for later in the season. Once the Warriors returned to action on January 24 at home against the Atlanta Hawks, they would honor Milojević with a ceremony honoring his legacy and life, as well as displaying "DM" patches on their jerseys and painting "DM" on their court for the remainder of the season.

The Warriors struggled as the season started, as after a 5–1 start they lost 7 of their next 8 games, including a 6-game losing skid and 14–23 in games between December and January, tumbling to a 19–24 record. The month of February saw a resurgence for the Warriors, as they went 11–3 and achieved a 32–27 record by March. Despite initial struggles, however, they ended March and started April going 9–1 in their next ten games and achieved a 44–35 record. On April 4, the Warriors secured their eleventh winning season in twelve seasons. On April 7, after the Warriors beat the Jazz, and the Rockets lost to the Mavericks, they secured a spot in the postseason, with the NBA play-in tournament for the first time since 2021. They improved upon their 44–38 record from last year after a win over the Portland Trail Blazers. Despite this, on April 16, the Warriors were eliminated in the first stage of postseason by the Sacramento Kings in the Play-In Tournament, losing 118–94. This would also become the final season that the Splash Brothers would play together, as Klay Thompson would leave the team in a sign-and-trade entering free agency on July 6.

The Golden State Warriors drew an average home attendance of 18,064 in 41 home games in the 2023-24 NBA season, the 17th highest in the league.

== Draft ==
| Round | Pick | Player | Position | Nationality | School / club team |
|---|---|---|---|---|---|
| 1 | 19 | Brandin Podziemski | SG | United States | Santa Clara (So.) |

The Warriors entered the draft with one first-round pick. The team traded their second-round pick to the New Orleans Pelicans in 2019; the pick was eventually used by the Cleveland Cavaliers in the draft.

Following the draft, they acquired the 57th pick from the Washington Wizards in exchange for cash considerations.

== Roster ==
2023–24 Golden State Warriors roster
Players

| Pos. | No. | Player | Height | Weight | DOB | From |
|---|---|---|---|---|---|---|
| G | 30 | Stephen Curry | 6 ft 2 in (1.88 m) | 185 lb (84 kg) | 1988-03-14 | Davidson |
| F/C | 12 | Usman Garuba | 6 ft 8 in (2.03 m) | 229 lb (104 kg) | 2002-03-09 | Spain |
| F | 23 | Draymond Green | 6 ft 6 in (1.98 m) | 230 lb (104 kg) | 1990-03-04 | Michigan State |
| F/C | 32 | Trayce Jackson-Davis | 6 ft 9 in (2.06 m) | 245 lb (111 kg) | 2000-02-22 | Indiana |
| F | 00 | Jonathan Kuminga | 6 ft 7 in (2.01 m) | 225 lb (102 kg) | 2002-10-06 | The Patrick School (NJ) |
| F/C | 5 | Kevon Looney | 6 ft 9 in (2.06 m) | 222 lb (101 kg) | 1996-02-06 | UCLA |
| G | 4 | Moses Moody | 6 ft 5 in (1.96 m) | 211 lb (96 kg) | 2002-05-31 | Arkansas |
| G | 3 | Chris Paul | 6 ft 0 in (1.83 m) | 175 lb (79 kg) | 1985-05-06 | Wake Forest |
| G/F | 0 | Gary II Payton (injured) | 6 ft 2 in (1.88 m) | 195 lb (88 kg) | 1992-12-01 | Oregon State |
| G | 2 | Brandin Podziemski | 6 ft 5 in (1.96 m) | 205 lb (93 kg) | 2003-02-25 | Santa Clara |
| G/F | 25 | Lester Quiñones | 6 ft 4 in (1.93 m) | 208 lb (94 kg) | 2000-11-16 | Memphis |
| G | 18 | Jerome Robinson (TW) | 6 ft 4 in (1.93 m) | 190 lb (86 kg) | 1997-02-22 | Boston College |
| G | 15 | Gui Santos | 6 ft 6 in (1.98 m) | 185 lb (84 kg) | 2002-06-22 | Brazil |
| F/C | 20 | Dario Šarić | 6 ft 10 in (2.08 m) | 225 lb (102 kg) | 1994-04-08 | Croatia |
| G | 61 | Pat Spencer (TW) | 6 ft 3 in (1.91 m) | 205 lb (93 kg) | 1996-07-04 | Northwestern |
| G/F | 11 | Klay Thompson | 6 ft 6 in (1.98 m) | 220 lb (100 kg) | 1990-02-08 | Washington State |
| F | 22 | Andrew Wiggins | 6 ft 7 in (2.01 m) | 197 lb (89 kg) | 1995-02-23 | Kansas |

Coaches
Head coach
- Steve Kerr
Assistant(s)
- Ron Adams
- Kenny Atkinson
- Chris DeMarco
- Bruce Fraser
- Kris Weems

Legend
- (DP) Unsigned draft pick
- (FA) Free agent
- (S) Suspended
- (GL) On assignment to G League affiliate
- (TW) Two-way affiliate player
- Injured

Roster
Updated: April 14, 2024

== Standings ==
=== Division ===
| Pacific Division | W | L | PCT | GB | Home | Road | Div | GP |
|---|---|---|---|---|---|---|---|---|
| y – Los Angeles Clippers | 51 | 31 | .622 | – | 25‍–‍16 | 26‍–‍15 | 9‍–‍7 | 82 |
| x – Phoenix Suns | 49 | 33 | .598 | 2.0 | 25‍–‍16 | 24‍–‍17 | 9‍–‍9 | 82 |
| x – Los Angeles Lakers | 47 | 35 | .573 | 4.0 | 28‍–‍14 | 19‍–‍21 | 7‍–‍10 | 82 |
| pi – Sacramento Kings | 46 | 36 | .561 | 5.0 | 24‍–‍17 | 22‍–‍19 | 10‍–‍7 | 82 |
| pi – Golden State Warriors | 46 | 36 | .561 | 5.0 | 21‍–‍20 | 25‍–‍16 | 7‍–‍9 | 82 |

=== Conference ===
Western Conference
| # | Team | W | L | PCT | GB | GP |
|---|---|---|---|---|---|---|
| 1 | c – Oklahoma City Thunder * | 57 | 25 | .695 | – | 82 |
| 2 | x – Denver Nuggets | 57 | 25 | .695 | – | 82 |
| 3 | x – Minnesota Timberwolves | 56 | 26 | .683 | 1.0 | 82 |
| 4 | y – Los Angeles Clippers * | 51 | 31 | .622 | 6.0 | 82 |
| 5 | y – Dallas Mavericks * | 50 | 32 | .610 | 7.0 | 82 |
| 6 | x – Phoenix Suns | 49 | 33 | .598 | 8.0 | 82 |
| 7 | x – New Orleans Pelicans | 49 | 33 | .598 | 8.0 | 82 |
| 8 | x – Los Angeles Lakers | 47 | 35 | .573 | 10.0 | 82 |
| 9 | pi – Sacramento Kings | 46 | 36 | .561 | 11.0 | 82 |
| 10 | pi – Golden State Warriors | 46 | 36 | .561 | 11.0 | 82 |
| 11 | Houston Rockets | 41 | 41 | .500 | 16.0 | 82 |
| 12 | Utah Jazz | 31 | 51 | .378 | 26.0 | 82 |
| 13 | Memphis Grizzlies | 27 | 55 | .329 | 30.0 | 82 |
| 14 | San Antonio Spurs | 22 | 60 | .268 | 35.0 | 82 |
| 15 | Portland Trail Blazers | 21 | 61 | .256 | 36.0 | 82 |

== Game log ==
=== Preseason ===
2023 preseason game log
Total: 4–1 (Home: 2–1; Road: 2–0)
Preseason: 4–1 (home: 2–1; road: 2–0)

| Game | Date | Team | Score | High points | High rebounds | High assists | Location Attendance | Record |
|---|---|---|---|---|---|---|---|---|
| 1 | October 7 | L.A. Lakers | W 125–108 | Jonathan Kuminga (24) | Jonathan Kuminga (8) | Chris Paul (5) | Chase Center; 18,064 | 1–0 |
| 2 | October 13 | @ L.A. Lakers | W 129–125 | Jonathan Kuminga (26) | Brandin Podziemski (6) | Brandin Podziemski (10) | Crypto.com Arena; 18,997 | 2–0 |
| 3 | October 15 | @ Sacramento | W 121–115 (OT) | Jonathan Kuminga (28) | Kevon Looney (14) | Podziemski, Quiñones (4) | Golden 1 Center; 17,884 | 3–0 |
| 4 | October 18 | Sacramento | W 116–115 | Stephen Curry (30) | Trayce Jackson-Davis (10) | Chris Paul (9) | Chase Center; 18,064 | 4–0 |
| 5 | October 20 | San Antonio | L 117–122 | Moses Moody (18) | Moses Moody (8) | Paul, Joseph, Kuminga (5) | Chase Center; 18,064 | 4–1 |

2023–24 season schedule

=== Regular season ===
2023–24 game log
Total: 46–36 (Home: 21–20; Road: 25–16)
October: 3–1 (home: 0–1; road: 3–0)

| Game | Date | Team | Score | High points | High rebounds | High assists | Location Attendance | Record |
|---|---|---|---|---|---|---|---|---|
| 1 | October 24 | Phoenix | L 104–108 | Stephen Curry (27) | Kevon Looney (11) | Chris Paul (9) | Chase Center; 18,064 | 0–1 |
| 2 | October 27 | @ Sacramento | W 122–114 | Stephen Curry (41) | Kevon Looney (12) | Chris Paul (12) | Golden 1 Center; 18,250 | 1–1 |
| 3 | October 29 | @ Houston | W 106–95 | Stephen Curry (24) | Kevon Looney (11) | Chris Paul (7) | Toyota Center; 18,055 | 2–1 |
| 4 | October 30 | @ New Orleans | W 130–102 | Stephen Curry (42) | Dario Šarić (10) | Draymond Green (7) | Smoothie King Center; 17,286 | 3–1 |

November: 6–9 (home: 4–5; road: 2–4)

| Game | Date | Team | Score | High points | High rebounds | High assists | Location Attendance | Record |
|---|---|---|---|---|---|---|---|---|
| 5 | November 1 | Sacramento | W 102–101 | Stephen Curry (21) | Kevon Looney (9) | Draymond Green (9) | Chase Center; 18,064 | 4–1 |
| 6 | November 3 | @ Oklahoma City | W 141–139 | Stephen Curry (30) | Stephen Curry (8) | Chris Paul (13) | Paycom Center; 16,827 | 5–1 |
| 7 | November 5 | @ Cleveland | L 104–115 | Stephen Curry (28) | Kevon Looney (11) | Draymond Green (8) | Rocket Mortgage FieldHouse; 19,432 | 5–2 |
| 8 | November 6 | @ Detroit | W 120–109 | Stephen Curry (34) | Draymond Green (9) | Draymond Green (8) | Little Caesars Arena; 20,062 | 6–2 |
| 9 | November 8 | @ Denver | L 105–108 | Stephen Curry (23) | Looney, Šarić (8) | Curry, Looney, Paul (4) | Ball Arena; 19,737 | 6–3 |
| 10 | November 11 | Cleveland | L 110–118 | Stephen Curry (30) | Kevon Looney (13) | Chris Paul (9) | Chase Center; 18,064 | 6–4 |
| 11 | November 12 | Minnesota | L 110–116 | Stephen Curry (38) | Dario Šarić (10) | Draymond Green (7) | Chase Center; 18,064 | 6–5 |
| 12 | November 14 | Minnesota | L 101–104 | Brandin Podziemski (23) | Kevon Looney (12) | Brandin Podziemski (5) | Chase Center; 18,064 | 6–6 |
| 13 | November 16 | Oklahoma City | L 109–128 | Jonathan Kuminga (21) | Kevon Looney (11) | Chris Paul (8) | Chase Center; 18,064 | 6–7 |
| 14 | November 18 | Oklahoma City | L 123–130 (OT) | Andrew Wiggins (31) | Kevon Looney (16) | Chris Paul (11) | Chase Center; 18,064 | 6–8 |
| 15 | November 20 | Houston | W 121–116 | Stephen Curry (32) | Andrew Wiggins (7) | Chris Paul (12) | Chase Center; 18,064 | 7–8 |
| 16 | November 22 | @ Phoenix | L 115–123 | Klay Thompson (23) | Moses Moody (9) | Curry, Paul (6) | Footprint Center; 17,071 | 7–9 |
| 17 | November 24 | San Antonio | W 118–112 | Stephen Curry (35) | Kevon Looney (8) | Chris Paul (10) | Chase Center; 18,064 | 8–9 |
| 18 | November 28 | @ Sacramento | L 123–124 | Curry, Wiggins (29) | Curry, Wiggins (10) | Stephen Curry (6) | Golden 1 Center; 18,039 | 8–10 |
| 19 | November 30 | L.A. Clippers | W 120–114 | Stephen Curry (26) | Brandin Podziemski (8) | Stephen Curry (8) | Chase Center; 18,064 | 9–10 |

December: 6–7 (home: 5–2; road: 1–5)

| Game | Date | Team | Score | High points | High rebounds | High assists | Location Attendance | Record |
|---|---|---|---|---|---|---|---|---|
| 20 | December 2 | @ L.A. Clippers | L 112–113 | Stephen Curry (22) | Draymond Green (9) | Stephen Curry (11) | Crypto.com Arena; 19,370 | 9–11 |
| 21 | December 6 | Portland | W 110–106 | Stephen Curry (31) | Draymond Green (10) | Draymond Green (9) | Chase Center; 18,064 | 10–11 |
| 22 | December 8 | @ Oklahoma City | L 136–138 (OT) | Stephen Curry (34) | Kuminga, Šarić (12) | Draymond Green (13) | Paycom Center; 17,112 | 10–12 |
| 23 | December 12 | @ Phoenix | L 116–119 | Stephen Curry (24) | Brandin Podziemski (11) | Chris Paul (11) | Footprint Center; 17,071 | 10–13 |
| 24 | December 14 | @ L.A. Clippers | L 113–121 | Klay Thompson (30) | Looney, Podziemski (7) | Looney, Thompson (5) | Crypto.com Arena; 19,370 | 10–14 |
| 25 | December 16 | Brooklyn | W 124–120 | Stephen Curry (37) | Kevon Looney (7) | Chris Paul (11) | Chase Center; 18,064 | 11–14 |
| 26 | December 17 | @ Portland | W 118–114 | Klay Thompson (28) | Trayce Jackson-Davis (8) | Curry, Paul (8) | Moda Center; 18,547 | 12–14 |
| 27 | December 19 | Boston | W 132–126 (OT) | Stephen Curry (33) | Trayce Jackson-Davis (13) | Chris Paul (12) | Chase Center; 18,064 | 13–14 |
| 28 | December 22 | Washington | W 129–118 | Stephen Curry (30) | Trayce Jackson-Davis (15) | Chris Paul (10) | Chase Center; 18,064 | 14–14 |
| 29 | December 23 | Portland | W 126–106 | Klay Thompson (28) | Kevon Looney (11) | Chris Paul (11) | Chase Center; 18,064 | 15–14 |
| 30 | December 25 | @ Denver | L 114–120 | Andrew Wiggins (22) | Brandin Podziemski (9) | Brandin Podziemski (6) | Ball Arena; 19,811 | 15–15 |
| 31 | December 28 | Miami | L 102–114 | Curry, Thompson (13) | Trayce Jackson-Davis (11) | Brandin Podziemski (6) | Chase Center; 18,064 | 15–16 |
| 32 | December 30 | Dallas | L 122–132 | Stephen Curry (25) | Kuminga, Podziemski, Šarić (9) | Stephen Curry (7) | Chase Center; 18,064 | 15–17 |

January: 5–7 (home: 4–5; road: 1–2)

| Game | Date | Team | Score | High points | High rebounds | High assists | Location Attendance | Record |
|---|---|---|---|---|---|---|---|---|
| 33 | January 2 | Orlando | W 121–115 | Stephen Curry (36) | Jonathan Kuminga (6) | Stephen Curry (6) | Chase Center; 18,064 | 16–17 |
| 34 | January 4 | Denver | L 127–130 | Stephen Curry (30) | Dario Šarić (7) | Curry, Paul, Šarić (6) | Chase Center; 18,064 | 16–18 |
| 35 | January 5 | Detroit | W 113–109 | Stephen Curry (26) | Trayce Jackson-Davis (9) | Brandin Podziemski (5) | Chase Center; 18,064 | 17–18 |
| 36 | January 7 | Toronto | L 118–133 | Klay Thompson (25) | Trayce Jackson-Davis (11) | Stephen Curry (6) | Chase Center; 18,064 | 17–19 |
| 37 | January 10 | New Orleans | L 105–141 | Moses Moody (21) | Brandin Podziemski (9) | Stephen Curry (6) | Chase Center; 18,064 | 17–20 |
| 38 | January 12 | @ Chicago | W 140–131 | Klay Thompson (30) | Jackson-Davis, Šarić (7) | Stephen Curry (9) | United Center; 21,153 | 18–20 |
| 39 | January 13 | @ Milwaukee | L 118–129 | Jonathan Kuminga (28) | Brandin Podziemski (10) | Dario Šarić (6) | Fiserv Forum; 18,009 | 18–21 |
| 40 | January 15 | @ Memphis | L 107–116 | Stephen Curry (26) | Jonathan Kuminga (11) | Stephen Curry (8) | FedExForum; 16,612 | 18–22 |
| – | January 17 | @ Utah | Postponed due to the death of Dejan Milojević; Makeup date February 15 | | | | | |
| – | January 19 | Dallas | Postponed due to the death of Dejan Milojević; Makeup date April 2 | | | | | |
| 41 | January 24 | Atlanta | W 134–112 | Curry, Kuminga (25) | Jonathan Kuminga (9) | Stephen Curry (8) | Chase Center; 18,064 | 19–22 |
| 42 | January 25 | Sacramento | L 133–134 | Stephen Curry (33) | Stephen Curry (6) | Draymond Green (11) | Chase Center; 18,064 | 19–23 |
| 43 | January 27 | L.A. Lakers | L 144–145 (2OT) | Stephen Curry (46) | Draymond Green (14) | Draymond Green (11) | Chase Center; 18,064 | 19–24 |
| 44 | January 30 | Philadelphia | W 119–107 | Stephen Curry (37) | Stephen Curry (8) | Curry, Šarić (7) | Chase Center; 18,064 | 20–24 |

February: 11–3 (home: 3–2; road: 8–1)

| Game | Date | Team | Score | High points | High rebounds | High assists | Location Attendance | Record |
|---|---|---|---|---|---|---|---|---|
| 45 | February 2 | @ Memphis | W 121–101 | Jonathan Kuminga (29) | Draymond Green (12) | Brandin Podziemski (14) | FedExForum; 17,794 | 21–24 |
| 46 | February 3 | @ Atlanta | L 134–141 (OT) | Stephen Curry (60) | Brandin Podziemski (11) | Draymond Green (8) | State Farm Arena; 17,600 | 21–25 |
| 47 | February 5 | @ Brooklyn | W 109–98 | Stephen Curry (29) | Brandin Podziemski (11) | Draymond Green (7) | Barclays Center; 17,919 | 22–25 |
| 48 | February 7 | @ Philadelphia | W 127–104 | Andrew Wiggins (21) | Andrew Wiggins (10) | Kuminga, Podziemski (5) | Wells Fargo Center; 19,780 | 23–25 |
| 49 | February 8 | @ Indiana | W 131–109 | Stephen Curry (42) | Green, Santos (8) | Brandin Podziemski (7) | Gainbridge Fieldhouse; 17,274 | 24–25 |
| 50 | February 10 | Phoenix | W 113–112 | Stephen Curry (30) | Stephen Curry (9) | Draymond Green (9) | Chase Center; 18,064 | 25–25 |
| 51 | February 12 | @ Utah | W 129–107 | Klay Thompson (26) | Draymond Green (9) | Stephen Curry (10) | Delta Center; 18,206 | 26–25 |
| 52 | February 14 | L.A. Clippers | L 125–130 | Stephen Curry (41) | Draymond Green (10) | Brandin Podziemski (8) | Chase Center; 18,064 | 26–26 |
| 53 | February 15 | @ Utah | W 140–137 | Klay Thompson (35) | Andrew Wiggins (7) | Stephen Curry (10) | Delta Center; 18,206 | 27–26 |
All-Star Game
| 54 | February 22 | L.A. Lakers | W 128–110 | Stephen Curry (32) | Brandin Podziemski (9) | Stephen Curry (8) | Chase Center; 18,064 | 28–26 |
| 55 | February 23 | Charlotte | W 97–84 | Stephen Curry (15) | Draymond Green (13) | Kuminga, Podziemski (6) | Chase Center; 18,064 | 29–26 |
| 56 | February 25 | Denver | L 103–119 | Klay Thompson (23) | Kuminga, Podziemski (6) | four players (4) | Chase Center; 18,604 | 29–27 |
| 57 | February 27 | @ Washington | W 123–112 | Klay Thompson (25) | Draymond Green (8) | Draymond Green (8) | Capital One Arena; 20,333 | 30–27 |
| 58 | February 29 | @ New York | W 110–99 | Stephen Curry (31) | Stephen Curry (11) | Green, Paul (6) | Madison Square Garden; 19,812 | 31–27 |

March: 9–7 (home: 2–4; road: 7–3)

| Game | Date | Team | Score | High points | High rebounds | High assists | Location Attendance | Record |
|---|---|---|---|---|---|---|---|---|
| 59 | March 1 | @ Toronto | W 120–105 | Stephen Curry (25) | Draymond Green (13) | Stephen Curry (6) | Scotiabank Arena; 19,800 | 32–27 |
| 60 | March 3 | @ Boston | L 88–140 | Lester Quiñones (17) | Gui Santos (9) | Chris Paul (7) | TD Garden; 19,156 | 32–28 |
| 61 | March 6 | Milwaukee | W 125–90 | Stephen Curry (29) | Stephen Curry (8) | Chris Paul (9) | Chase Center; 18,064 | 33–28 |
| 62 | March 7 | Chicago | L 122–125 | Klay Thompson (25) | Green, Kuminga (10) | Draymond Green (12) | Chase Center; 18,064 | 33–29 |
| 63 | March 9 | San Antonio | L 113–126 | Klay Thompson (27) | three players (6) | Chris Paul (9) | Chase Center; 18,064 | 33–30 |
| 64 | March 11 | @ San Antonio | W 112–102 | Jonathan Kuminga (22) | Trayce Jackson-Davis (11) | Chris Paul (8) | Frost Bank Center; 18,354 | 34–30 |
| 65 | March 13 | @ Dallas | L 99–109 | Jonathan Kuminga (27) | Trayce Jackson-Davis (9) | Brandin Podziemski (6) | American Airlines Center; 20,411 | 34–31 |
| 66 | March 16 | @ L.A. Lakers | W 128–121 | Stephen Curry (31) | Draymond Green (12) | Draymond Green (13) | Crypto.com Arena; 18,997 | 35–31 |
| 67 | March 18 | New York | L 112–119 | Stephen Curry (27) | Trayce Jackson-Davis (9) | Klay Thompson (8) | Chase Center; 18,064 | 35–32 |
| 68 | March 20 | Memphis | W 137–116 | Jonathan Kuminga (26) | Draymond Green (12) | Chris Paul (14) | Chase Center; 18,064 | 36–32 |
| 69 | March 22 | Indiana | L 111–123 | Stephen Curry (25) | Stephen Curry (11) | Draymond Green (6) | Chase Center; 18,064 | 36–33 |
| 70 | March 24 | @ Minnesota | L 110–114 | Stephen Curry (31) | Green, Payton II (8) | Gary Payton II (7) | Target Center; 18,024 | 36–34 |
| 71 | March 26 | @ Miami | W 113–92 | Klay Thompson (28) | Draymond Green (9) | Draymond Green (8) | Kaseya Center; 19,813 | 37–34 |
| 72 | March 27 | @ Orlando | W 101–93 | Andrew Wiggins (23) | Trayce Jackson-Davis (14) | Stephen Curry (10) | Kia Center; 19,210 | 38–34 |
| 73 | March 29 | @ Charlotte | W 115–97 | Stephen Curry (23) | three players (8) | Chris Paul (9) | Spectrum Center; 19,487 | 39–34 |
| 74 | March 31 | @ San Antonio | W 117–113 | Stephen Curry (33) | Jackson-Davis, Podziemski (7) | Draymond Green (11) | Frost Bank Center; 18,718 | 40–34 |

April: 6–2 (home: 3–1; road: 3–1)

| Game | Date | Team | Score | High points | High rebounds | High assists | Location Attendance | Record |
|---|---|---|---|---|---|---|---|---|
| 75 | April 2 | Dallas | W 104–100 | Andrew Wiggins (23) | Jackson-Davis, Podziemski (10) | Stephen Curry (7) | Chase Center; 18,064 | 41–34 |
| 76 | April 4 | @ Houston | W 133–110 | Curry, Thompson (29) | Draymond Green (8) | Stephen Curry (6) | Toyota Center; 18,055 | 42–34 |
| 77 | April 5 | @ Dallas | L 106–108 | Stephen Curry (28) | Trayce Jackson-Davis (8) | Chris Paul (8) | American Airlines Center; 20,425 | 42–35 |
| 78 | April 7 | Utah | W 118–110 | Klay Thompson (32) | Jonathan Kuminga (10) | Chris Paul (9) | Chase Center; 18,064 | 43–35 |
| 79 | April 9 | @ L.A. Lakers | W 134–120 | Klay Thompson (27) | Curry, Jackson-Davis (7) | Draymond Green (10) | Crypto.com Arena; 18,997 | 44–35 |
| 80 | April 11 | @ Portland | W 100–92 | Stephen Curry (22) | Kevon Looney (11) | Stephen Curry (8) | Moda Center; 19,335 | 45–35 |
| 81 | April 12 | New Orleans | L 109–114 | Stephen Curry (33) | Draymond Green (12) | Draymond Green (11) | Chase Center; 18,064 | 45–36 |
| 82 | April 14 | Utah | W 123–116 | Klay Thompson (25) | Brandin Podziemski (9) | Jonathan Kuminga (7) | Chase Center; 18,064 | 46–36 |

2023–24 season schedule

=== Play-in ===
2024 play-in game log
Total: 0–1 (Home: 0–0; Road: 0–1)
Play-in: 0–1 (home: 0–0; road: 0–1)

| Game | Date | Team | Score | High points | High rebounds | High assists | Location Attendance | Record |
|---|---|---|---|---|---|---|---|---|
| 1 | April 16 | @ Sacramento | L 94–118 | Stephen Curry (22) | Brandin Podziemski (8) | Draymond Green (6) | Golden 1 Center; 18,304 | 0–1 |

2023–24 season schedule

=== In-Season Tournament ===
This was the first regular season where all the NBA teams competed in a mid-season tournament setting due to the implementation of the 2023 NBA In-Season Tournament. During the in-season tournament period, the Warriors competed in Group C of the Western Conference, which included the Sacramento Kings, Minnesota Timberwolves, Oklahoma City Thunder, and San Antonio Spurs.

==== West group C ====
| Pos | Team | Pld | W | L | PF | PA | PD | Qualification | SAC | MIN | GSW | OKC | SAS |
|---|---|---|---|---|---|---|---|---|---|---|---|---|---|
| 1 | Sacramento Kings | 4 | 4 | 0 | 482 | 452 | +30 | Advance to knockout stage | — | 124–111 | 124–123 | 105–98 | 129–120 |
| 2 | Minnesota Timberwolves | 4 | 3 | 1 | 438 | 438 | 0 | | 111–124 | — | 104–101 | 106–103 | 117–110 |
| 3 | Golden State Warriors | 4 | 2 | 2 | 483 | 479 | +4 | | 123–124 | 101–104 | — | 141–139 | 118–112 |
| 4 | Oklahoma City Thunder | 4 | 1 | 3 | 463 | 439 | +24 | | 98–105 | 103–106 | 139–141 | — | 123–87 |
| 5 | San Antonio Spurs | 4 | 0 | 4 | 429 | 487 | −58 | | 120–129 | 110–117 | 112–118 | 87–123 | — |

Source: NBA
Rules for classification: Tiebreakers

== Player statistics ==
Legend
| GP | Games played | GS | Games started | MPG | Minutes per game |
| FG% | Field-goal percentage | 3P% | 3-point field-goal percentage | FT% | Free-throw percentage |
| RPG | Rebounds per game | APG | Assists per game | SPG | Steals per game |
| BPG | Blocks per game | PPG | Points per game |

=== Regular season ===
Golden State Warriors statistics
| Player | GP | GS | MPG | FG% | 3P% | FT% | RPG | APG | SPG | BPG | PPG |
|---|---|---|---|---|---|---|---|---|---|---|---|
| Stephen Curry | 74 | 74 | 32.7 | .450 | .408 | .923 | 4.5 | 5.1 | .7 | .4 | 26.4 |
| Usman Garuba | 6 | 0 | 3.0 | .167 | .000 | .500 | 1.2 | .2 | .2 | .5 | .5 |
| Draymond Green | 55 | 52 | 27.1 | .497 | .395 | .730 | 7.2 | 6.0 | 1.0 | .9 | 8.6 |
| Trayce Jackson-Davis | 68 | 16 | 16.6 | .702 | .000 | .561 | 5.0 | 1.2 | .4 | 1.1 | 7.9 |
| Cory Joseph | 26 | 0 | 11.4 | .359 | .310 | .571 | 1.2 | 1.6 | .2 | .1 | 2.4 |
| Jonathan Kuminga | 74 | 46 | 26.3 | .529 | .321 | .746 | 4.8 | 2.2 | .7 | .5 | 16.1 |
| Kevon Looney | 74 | 36 | 16.1 | .597 | .000 | .675 | 5.7 | 1.8 | .4 | .4 | 4.5 |
| Moses Moody | 66 | 9 | 17.5 | .462 | .360 | .785 | 3.0 | .9 | .6 | .4 | 8.1 |
| Chris Paul | 58 | 18 | 26.4 | .441 | .371 | .827 | 3.9 | 6.8 | 1.2 | .1 | 9.2 |
| Gary Payton II | 44 | 0 | 15.5 | .563 | .364 | .609 | 2.6 | 1.1 | .9 | .4 | 5.5 |
| Brandin Podziemski | 74 | 28 | 26.6 | .454 | .385 | .633 | 5.8 | 3.7 | .8 | .2 | 9.2 |
| Lester Quiñones | 37 | 0 | 10.6 | .397 | .364 | .690 | 1.9 | 1.0 | .2 | .1 | 4.4 |
| Jerome Robinson | 22 | 0 | 3.7 | .333 | .118 | .636 | .3 | .2 | .0 | .1 | 1.4 |
| Gui Santos | 23 | 0 | 8.3 | .509 | .370 | .941 | 2.1 | .6 | .2 | .1 | 3.6 |
| Dario Šarić | 64 | 9 | 17.2 | .466 | .376 | .849 | 4.4 | 2.3 | .5 | .2 | 8.0 |
| Pat Spencer | 6 | 0 | 4.3 | .500 | .000 | | .7 | .8 | .0 | .0 | .7 |
| Klay Thompson | 77 | 63 | 29.7 | .432 | .387 | .927 | 3.3 | 2.3 | .6 | .5 | 17.9 |
| Andrew Wiggins | 71 | 59 | 27.0 | .453 | .358 | .751 | 4.5 | 1.7 | .6 | .6 | 13.2 |

- ^{†} Denotes player spent time with another team in the season. Stats reflect time with the Warriors only.

== Transactions ==
=== Trades ===
| July 6, 2023 | To Golden State Warriors • (United States) Chris Paul • Draft rights to (United States) Trayce Jackson-Davis (No. 57) | To Washington Wizards • (United States) Jordan Poole • (United States) Ryan Rollins • (United States) Patrick Baldwin Jr. • 2027 GSW second-round pick • 2030 GSW protected first-round pick • Cash considerations |
| February 8, 2024 | To Golden State Warriors • 2024 second-round pick | To Indiana Pacers • (Canada) Cory Joseph • 2025 CHA protected second-round pick • Cash considerations |

=== Free agency ===
==== Re-signed ====
| Date | Player | Ref. |
|---|---|---|
| July 8, 2023 | (United States) Draymond Green | |
| July 24, 2023 | (Dominican Republic) Lester Quiñones | |

==== Additions ====
| Date | Player | Former team | Ref. |
|---|---|---|---|
| July 6, 2023 | (Canada) Cory Joseph | Detroit Pistons | |
| July 12, 2023 | (Croatia) Dario Šarić | Oklahoma City Thunder | |
| September 25, 2023 | (Spain) Usman Garuba | Houston Rockets | |
| September 29, 2023 | (United States) Jerome Robinson | Santa Cruz Warriors (NBA G League) | |
| November 7, 2023 | (Brazil) Gui Santos | Santa Cruz Warriors (NBA G League) | |

==== Subtractions ====
| Date | Player | New team | Ref. |
|---|---|---|---|
| July 6, 2023 | (United States) Ty Jerome | Cleveland Cavaliers | |
| July 8, 2023 | (United States) Donte DiVincenzo | New York Knicks | |
| October 10, 2023 | (United States) Anthony Lamb | New Zealand Breakers (Australia) | |
| October 20, 2023 | (United States) Andre Iguodala | NBA Retirement | |
