= NBA Community Assist Award =

National Basketball Association award

- Sport: Basketball
- League: National Basketball Association
- Awarded for: NBA player who best demonstrates passion for giving back to their communities.

The National Basketball Association awards the Bob Lanier Community Assist Award for community engagement, philanthropic activity, and charity work. It is a monthly award, but season and off-season awards have also been given. In some cases multiple awards have been given in the same month. In 2022, the season-long award was renamed in honor of late Naismith Memorial Basketball Hall of Famer and NBA Global Ambassador, Bob Lanier, following his death for his dedication to teaching NBA values and making a positive impact on communities across the globe. The award is sponsored by Kia Motors and is part of the NBA Cares program. In the 2012–13 NBA season the season long award was accompanied by a $25,000 donation from Kia and the NBA to a charity of the recipients choice.

== David Robinson Plaque ==
The winner of the award is presented a plaque dedicated to David Robinson. The plaque is inscribed. "Following the standard set by NBA Legend David Robinson, who improved the community piece by piece."

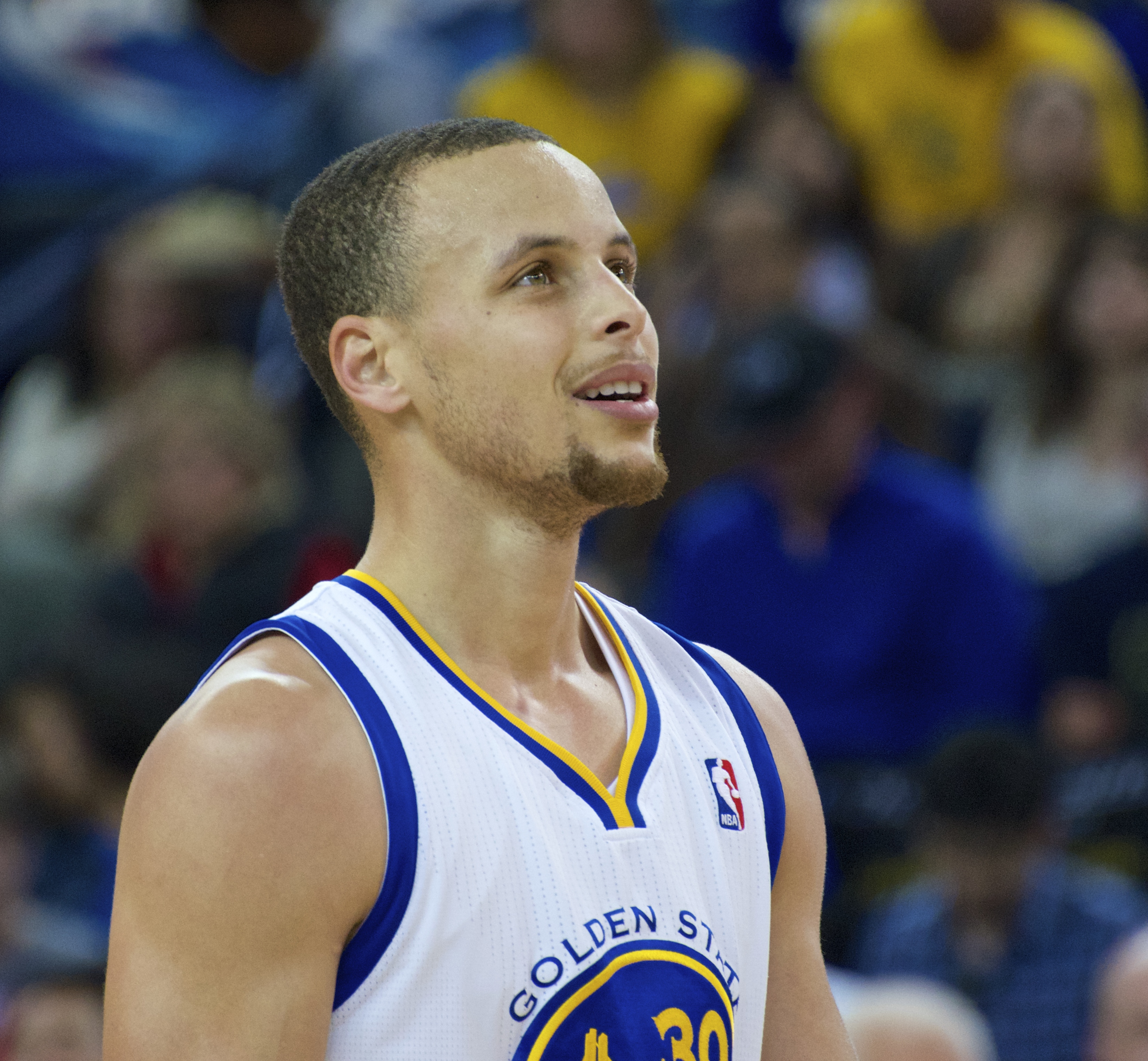
Stephen Curry won the season-long award in the 2013–14 season.

== Award winners ==
=== Monthly award winners ===
Season	October	November	December	January	February	March	April	May	June	July	August	September
2001–02	Jerry Stackhouse	Shareef Abdur-Rahim	Eric Snow	Adonal Foyle	Kevin Garnett	Desmond Mason	Shane Battier	Reggie Miller	Antoine Walker	Jason Terry	Shawn Marion	P. J. Brown
2002–03	Todd MacCulloch	Michael Finley	Michael Curry	Malik Rose	Chris Webber	Darrell Armstrong	Allan Houston	Jerry Stackhouse	Troy Hudson; Ervin Johnson; Mark Madsen; Cherokee Parks; Shawn Marion (Project Salute)	Antawn Jamison	Jalen Rose	Dikembe Mutombo
2003–04	Rashard Lewis	Aaron McKie & Marc Jackson	Jermaine O'Neal	Karl Malone	Dirk Nowitzki	Carlos Boozer	Derek Fisher	Lamar Odom	Kurt Thomas	Allen Iverson	Carmelo Anthony; Carlos Boozer; Tim Duncan; Allen Iverson; LeBron James; Richard Jefferson; Stephon Marbury; Shawn Marion; Lamar Odom; Emeka Okafor; Amar'e Stoudemire; Dwyane Wade (Team USA)	Adonal Foyle
2004–05	Damon Stoudamire	Steven Hunter & Marc Jackson	Shaquille O'Neal	Marcus Camby	Rasheed Wallace	Bruce Bowen	Derek Fisher	Jerome Williams	Chris Bosh	Vince Carter	Gilbert Arenas	NBA Players involved in Katrina efforts
2005–06	Drew Gooden	Kevin Garnett	Chris Webber	Bruce Bowen	Charlie Villanueva	Raja Bell	Rasheed Wallace	Theo Ratliff	LeBron James	Alonzo Mourning	Bo Outlaw	Chris Paul
2006–07	Eric Snow	Marcus Banks	Jermaine O'Neal	Rasual Butler	Greg Buckner	Al Harrington	Luol Deng	Mike Miller	Caron Butler	Dwight Howard	Dwyane Wade	Emeka Okafor
2007–08	Jamal Crawford	Chris Duhon	Dirk Nowitzki	Tracy McGrady	Al Horford	Stephen Jackson	Kevin Garnett	Mike Miller	LeBron James	Alonzo Mourning	Charlie Villanueva	Chris Paul
2008–09	Amar'e Stoudemire	Jason Terry	Peja Stojaković	Dwight Howard	Samuel Dalembert	Devin Harris	Leon Powe	Daequan Cook (off-season)				
2009–10	Dwight Howard	Shaquille O'Neal	Jason Kidd	Samuel Dalembert	Ronny Turiaf	Rudy Gay	Juwan Howard	Dwyane Wade (off-season)				
2010–11	Chris Paul	Deron Williams	Zach Randolph	Ray Allen	Brandon Jennings	Al Horford						
2011–12					Wesley Matthews	Gerald Henderson	Rudy Gay	Pau Gasol				
2012–13		Deron Williams	Kevin Love	Zach Randolph	Kenneth Faried	Damian Lillard	Chris Paul					
2013–14	George Hill	Zach Randolph	Rajon Rondo	Stephen Curry	Anthony Davis	Dwight Howard						
2014–15	Russell Westbrook	Klay Thompson	Ben McLemore	Anthony Davis	Joakim Noah	Tobias Harris	Chris Paul					
2015–16	John Wall	Carmelo Anthony	Victor Oladipo	Mike Conley	Andre Drummond	Anthony Davis	Zach LaVine					
2016–17	Tobias Harris	CJ McCollum	Isaiah Thomas	Zach Randolph	Elfrid Payton	Jrue Holiday	Jimmy Butler	DeMarcus Cousins (off-season)				
2017–18	JJ Barea	Ricky Rubio	LeBron James	Kevin Durant	CJ McCollum	Dwyane Wade	LeBron James (off-season)					
2018–19	Dwight Powell	Damian Lillard	Khris Middleton	Mike Conley	Pascal Siakam	Jarrett Allen	Gorgui Dieng (off-season)					
2019–20	Kevin Love	Devin Booker	DeAndre Jordan	Trae Young	Langston Galloway	Donovan Mitchell (off-season)						
2020–21				Jrue Holiday & Josh Richardson	Patty Mills	Joel Embiid	Damian Lillard	Devin Booker	Ricky Rubio (off-season)			
2021–22	Tobias Harris	Karl-Anthony Towns	Jaren Jackson Jr.	Gary Payton II	Trae Young	Bismack Biyombo	Pat Connaughton (off-season)					
2022–23	Marcus Smart	Tyrese Maxey	Cameron Payne	Alex Caruso	Keita Bates-Diop	Brook Lopez	Ayo Dosunmu (off-season)					
2023–24	CJ McCollum	Kyle Kuzma	Giannis Antetokounmpo	Julius Randle	Terance Mann	DeMar DeRozan	Luka Dončić	Tyrese Maxey (off-season)				
2024–25	Cole Anthony	Onyeka Okongwu	Jalen Brunson	Wendell Carter Jr.	Harrison Barnes	Anfernee Simons	Immanuel Quickley	Isaiah Hartenstein (off-season)				
2025–26	Tre Jones	Deandre Ayton	Bam Adebayo	Bobby Portis	Karl-Anthony Towns	Ryan Rollins	Duncan Robinson	Trae Young (off-season)				

=== Season-long award winners ===
- Pau Gasol (2011–12)
- Dwyane Wade (2012–13)
- Stephen Curry (2013–14)
- Russell Westbrook (2014–15)
- John Wall (2015–16)
- Isaiah Thomas (2016–17)
- Kevin Durant (2017–18)
- Bradley Beal (2018–19)
- Harrison Barnes, Jaylen Brown, George Hill, Chris Paul, Dwight Powell (2019–20)
- Devin Booker (2020–21)
- Gary Payton II (2021–22)
- Brook Lopez (2022–23)

== See also ==
- Walter Payton NFL Man of the Year Award (football)
- King Clancy Memorial Trophy (ice hockey)
- MLS Humanitarian of the Year Award (soccer)
- Allstate AFCA Good Works Team
- Bart Starr Award (football)
- J. Walter Kennedy Citizenship Award (basketball)
- List of NBA regular season records
