= Moses Moody =

American basketball player (born 2002)

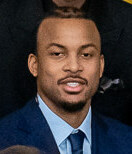
- Moody in 2023

No. 4 – Golden State Warriors
- Position: Shooting guard
- League: NBA

Personal information
- Born: May 31, 2002 (age 24) Little Rock, Arkansas, U.S.
- Listed height: 6 ft 5 in (1.96 m)
- Listed weight: 217 lb (98 kg)

Career information
- High school: Parkview (Little Rock, Arkansas); North Little Rock (North Little Rock, Arkansas); Montverde Academy (Montverde, Florida)
- College: Arkansas (2020–2021)
- NBA draft: 2021: 1st round, 14th overall pick
- Drafted by: Golden State Warriors
- Playing career: 2021–present

Career history
- 2021–present: Golden State Warriors
- 2021–2023: →Santa Cruz Warriors

Career highlights
- NBA champion (2022); AP honorable mention All-American (2021); First-team All-SEC (2021); SEC Freshman of the Year (2021); SEC All-Freshman Team (2021)
- Stats at NBA.com
- Stats at Basketball Reference

Moses Josiah Moody (born May 31, 2002) is an American professional basketball player for the Golden State Warriors of the National Basketball Association (NBA). He played college basketball for the Arkansas Razorbacks.

Moody was drafted 14th overall in the 2021 NBA draft by the Warriors. During his rookie season with the team, he won an NBA championship.

== Early life ==
Moody began playing high school basketball for Parkview Arts and Science Magnet High School in Little Rock, Arkansas, where he helped his team reach the state championship game in his freshman season. As a sophomore, he moved to North Little Rock High School in North Little Rock, Arkansas. Moody averaged 18.6 points, 7.2 rebounds, 3.1 assists, 2.1 steals and 1.4 blocks per game, leading his team to the Class 7A state title. He was named to the Arkansas Democrat-Gazette All-Underclassman Team and the Arkansas 7A All-State Team. For his junior year, Moody transferred to Montverde Academy in Montverde, Florida. He averaged 17.7 points, 3.9 rebounds, 1.5 assists and 1.6 steals per game for Bradley Beal Elite at the Nike Elite Youth Basketball League (EYBL) regular season and was named to the All-EYBL honorable mention. In his senior season, Moody averaged 11.6 points, 3.3 rebounds and 1.8 assists per game for Montverde, the consensus number one team in the nation, who he helped achieve a 25–0 regular season record.

Moody received several high major NCAA Division I scholarship offers as early as his sophomore season. He finished high school as a consensus four-star recruit in the 2020 class. On November 9, 2019, Moody committed to play college basketball for Arkansas over offers from Michigan and Virginia, among others. He became the highest-ranked player to commit to Arkansas since Bobby Portis of the 2013 class.

College recruiting
Name	Hometown	School	Height	Weight	Commit date
Moses Moody; SG	Little Rock, AR	Montverde Academy (FL)	6 ft 6 in (1.98 m)	185 lb (84 kg)	Nov 9, 2019
Moses Moody; SG	Recruit ratings: Rivals: 247Sports: ESPN: (87)				
Overall recruit ranking: Rivals: 55 247Sports: 39 ESPN: 45
Note: In many cases, Scout, Rivals, 247Sports, On3, and ESPN may conflict in their listings of height and weight.; In these cases, the average was taken. ESPN grades are on a 100-point scale.; Sources: "Arkansas 2020 Basketball Commitments". Rivals.; "2020 Arkansas Razorbacks Recruiting Class". ESPN.; "2020 Team Ranking". Rivals.

== College career ==
Moody recorded a career-high 28 points four times in the 2020–21 season for the Razorbacks. As a freshman, he averaged 16.8 points and 5.8 rebounds per game. Moody earned SEC Freshman of the Year and First Team All-SEC honors. After helping Arkansas to a 25–7 overall record, an Elite Eight appearance in the 2021 NCAA tournament, and a Top Ten finish in the polls, he declared for the 2021 NBA draft on April 9, 2021, forgoing his remaining college eligibility.

== Professional career ==
=== Golden State Warriors (2021–present) ===
Moody was selected with the 14th pick in the 2021 NBA draft by the Golden State Warriors. On August 5, 2021, Moody signed with the Warriors. On October 19, Moody made his debut in the NBA, coming off the bench with two points and two rebounds in a 121–114 win over the Los Angeles Lakers. On January 11, 2022, on assignment with the Santa Cruz Warriors of the NBA G League, Moody scored 37 points in a 132–130 overtime victory over the Memphis Hustle. On March 7, Moody scored a career-high 30 points in a 131–124 loss to the Denver Nuggets. On June 16, he won the 2022 NBA Finals with the Warriors.

On October 20, 2024, Moody signed a three-year, $39 million extension with the Warriors. He played in 74 games (34 starts) for Golden State during the 2024–25 NBA season, averaging 9.8 points, 2.6 rebounds, and 1.3 assists. On April 30, 2025, during the first round of the playoffs, Moody recorded 25 points, nine rebounds, two assists and two steals in a 131–116 Game 5 loss to the Houston Rockets. On May 22, Moody underwent surgery to repair a torn ulnar collateral ligament in his right thumb.

Moody made 60 appearances (49 starts) for Golden State during the 2025–26 NBA season, averaging career-highs in points (12.1), rebounds (3.3), assists (1.6), and steals (1.0). On March 23, 2026, in a game where the Warriors defeated the Dallas Mavericks 137–131 in overtime in Dallas, Moody suffered a non-contact injury late in the game. Medical evaluation confirmed that the wing player sustained a left patellar tendon tear, ending his season early.

== Personal life ==
Moody is the son of Kareem and Rona Moody. He has an older brother.

== Career statistics ==
Legend
GP	Games played	GS	Games started	MPG	Minutes per game
FG%	Field goal percentage	3P%	3-point field goal percentage	FT%	Free throw percentage
RPG	Rebounds per game	APG	Assists per game	SPG	Steals per game
BPG	Blocks per game	PPG	Points per game	**Bold**	Career high
†	Won an NBA championship

=== NBA ===
==== Regular season ====
Year	Team	GP	GS	MPG	FG%	3P%	FT%	RPG	APG	SPG	BPG	PPG
2021–22†	Golden State	52	11	11.7	.437	.364	.778	1.5	.4	.1	.2	4.4
2022–23	Golden State	63	3	13.0	**.476**	.363	.698	1.7	.8	.3	.1	4.8
2023–24	Golden State	66	9	17.5	.462	.360	.785	3.0	.9	.6	.4	8.1
2024–25	Golden State	**74**	34	22.3	.433	.374	**.797**	2.6	1.3	.8	.4	9.8
2025–26	Golden State	60	**49**	**25.7**	.440	**.401**	.770	**3.3**	**1.6**	**1.0**	**.6**	**12.1**
Career		315	106	18.3	.447	.378	.773	2.4	1.0	.6	.3	8.0

==== Playoffs ====
Year	Team	GP	GS	MPG	FG%	3P%	FT%	RPG	APG	SPG	BPG	PPG
2022†	Golden State	**13**	0	8.1	**.536**	.538	.667	.6	.3	.2	.2	3.2
2023	Golden State	12	0	13.4	.535	**.591**	**.917**	**2.6**	.7	.4	**.3**	5.8
2025	Golden State	12	**2**	**16.1**	.350	.333	.824	2.2	**1.2**	**.5**	**.3**	**7.1**
Career		37	2	12.4	.437	.438	.829	1.8	.7	.4	.3	5.3

=== College ===
Year	Team	GP	GS	MPG	FG%	3P%	FT%	RPG	APG	SPG	BPG	PPG
2020–21	Arkansas	32	32	33.8	.427	.358	.812	5.8	1.6	1.0	.7	16.8
