= Gui Santos =

Brazilian basketball player (born 2002)

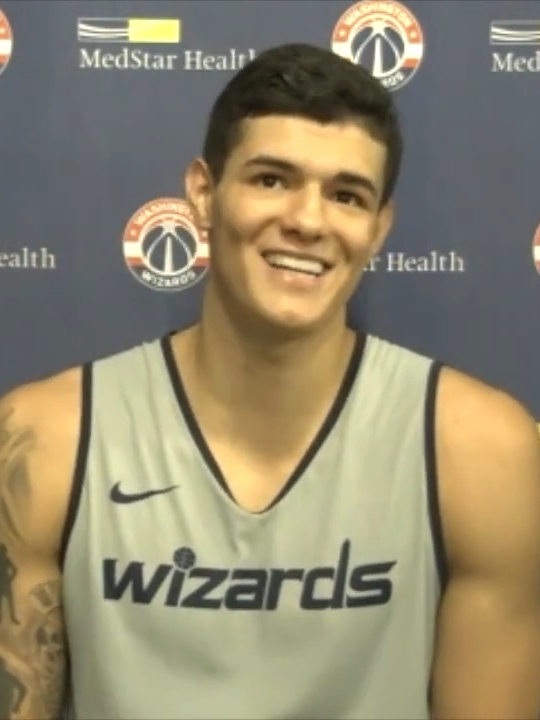
- Santos in 2021

No. 15 – Golden State Warriors
- Position: Small forward / power forward
- League: NBA

Personal information
- Born: 22 June 2002 (age 24) Brasília, Brazil
- Listed height: 6 ft 7 in (2.01 m)
- Listed weight: 225 lb (102 kg)

Career information
- NBA draft: 2022: 2nd round, 55th overall pick
- Drafted by: Golden State Warriors
- Playing career: 2018–present

Career history
- 2018–2022: Minas
- 2022–2023: Santa Cruz Warriors
- 2023–present: Golden State Warriors
- 2023–2025: →Santa Cruz Warriors

Career highlights
- NBA G League Next Up Game (2023); NBB Sixth Man of the Year (2022); Nike Hoop Summit (2021)
- Stats at NBA.com
- Stats at Basketball Reference
Medals
Men's basketball
Representing Brazil
FIBA South America U17 Championship
Gold medal – first place	2019 Chile	Team

Guilherme Carvalho dos Santos (born 22 June 2002) is a Brazilian professional basketball player for the Golden State Warriors of the National Basketball Association (NBA).

== Professional career ==
=== Minas (2018–2022) ===
Santos made his professional debut with Minas of the Novo Basquete Brasil (NBB) during the 2018–19 season. He averaged 6.7 points, 5.7 rebounds, 2.5 assists, 10.5 efficiency and 23.0 minutes on the court - at only 16 years of age. In the 2018–19 NBB season, because Santos was still in school and for several other reasons, he was unable to fully follow the adult team's routine.

In the 2019 Basketball Development League (LDB), he was the leader of the Minas team. At 17, his averages were 14.5 points, 6.4 rebounds and 2.6 assists in the U-20 championship. In 2019, Santos was already part of his club's senior cast. He entered the court in three Minas games in the 2018–19 NBB season—against Joinville, Vasco and Sesi Franca. In the 2019–20 NBB season, Minas' coach Léo Costa granted him a bigger role with the team.

In April 2021, Santos was named to the World Team for the Nike Hoop Summit. On April 21, he declared for the 2021 NBA draft. In the 2021–22 season, Santos was named the NBB Sixth Man of the Year after he averaged 10.1 points and 5.1 rebounds over the season.

On 3 September 2021, he scored a career-high 34 points for Minas' U20 team in a 72–77 away win over Flamengo U20.

=== Golden State / Santa Cruz Warriors (2022–present) ===
Santos was selected by the Golden State Warriors with the 55th overall pick in the 2022 NBA draft. He joined the Warriors for the 2022 NBA Summer League, and he later joined their NBA G League affiliate, the Santa Cruz Warriors. Santos was named to the G League's inaugural Next Up Game for the 2022–23 season.

On 7 November 2023, Golden State signed Santos to a three-year contract. Throughout the next two seasons, Santos was assigned several times to Santa Cruz. He made 23 appearances for the Warriors during his rookie campaign, averaging 3.6 points, 2.1 rebounds, and 0.6 assists.

On 15 January 2025, Santos made his first career start, tallying five points, three assists, and seven rebounds in a 116–115 victory over the Minnesota Timberwolves. He made 52 appearances (including two starts) for the Warriors during the 2024–25 NBA season, recording averages of 4.1 points, 3.1 rebounds, and 1.4 assists.

On 29 June 2025, the Warriors exercised the team option for Santos. On 28 February 2026, Santos signed a three-year, $15 million contract extension with the Warriors. On 7 March, he recorded a career-high 22 points and 11 rebounds in a 97–104 loss to the Oklahoma City Thunder. In a 109–106 victory over the Brooklyn Nets on 25 March, Santos increased his career-high to 31 points, also logging three rebounds, two steals, one assist, and one block.

== National team career ==
Santos helped Brazil win gold at the 2019 FIBA South America Under-17 Championship in Chile. He scored 27 points against Argentina in the final. Santos made his senior national team debut during 2022 FIBA AmeriCup qualification.

In February 2020, Santos was called up by Aleksandar Petrović for the Brazilian senior national team. He scored 11 points in the two games against Uruguay at the 2021 Copa America qualifiers.

== Career statistics ==
Legend
GP	Games played	GS	Games started	MPG	Minutes per game
FG%	Field goal percentage	3P%	3-point field goal percentage	FT%	Free throw percentage
RPG	Rebounds per game	APG	Assists per game	SPG	Steals per game
BPG	Blocks per game	PPG	Points per game	**Bold**	Career high

=== NBA ===
==== Regular season ====
Year	Team	GP	GS	MPG	FG%	3P%	FT%	RPG	APG	SPG	BPG	PPG
2023–24	Golden State	23	0	8.4	**.509**	**.370**	**.941**	2.1	.6	.2	.1	3.6
2024–25	Golden State	56	2	13.6	.458	.330	.690	3.1	1.4	.4	.2	4.1
2025–26	Golden State	**68**	**30**	**20.5**	.500	.351	.725	**3.9**	**2.3**	**.9**	**.3**	**9.2**
Career		147	32	16.0	.490	.347	.737	3.3	1.7	.6	.2	6.4

==== Playoffs ====
Year	Team	GP	GS	MPG	FG%	3P%	FT%	RPG	APG	SPG	BPG	PPG
2025	Golden State	10	0	7.2	.529	.400	.667	1.2	.8	.3	.1	2.6
Career		10	0	7.2	.529	.400	.667	1.2	.8	.3	.1	2.6

== Miscellaneous ==
Santos was one of the Brazilian representatives at Basketball Without Borders, a camp held by FIBA and the NBA that brought together 64 prospects from Latin America for training sessions in the city of Medellín (Colombia), and also at the FIBA Americas Youth Elite Camp, that happened in Campinas, Brazil at the end of 2018.

He recalls that especially the support of Minas teammates Alex Garcia and Leandro Barbosa, helped him shape his game and reach success.

== Personal life ==
Santos' father, Deivisson, is a former professional basketball player who played five seasons in the NBB. His mother, Lucineide, was also a basketball player.
