= Brandin Podziemski =

American basketball player (born 2003)

No. 2 – Golden State Warriors
- Position: Shooting guard
- League: NBA

Personal information
- Born: February 25, 2003 (age 23) Greenfield, Wisconsin, U.S.
- Listed height: 6 ft 4 in (1.93 m)
- Listed weight: 208 lb (94 kg)

Career information
- High school: St. John's Northwestern Military Academy (Delafield, Wisconsin)
- College: Illinois (2021–2022); Santa Clara (2022–2023)
- NBA draft: 2023: 1st round, 19th overall pick
- Drafted by: Golden State Warriors
- Playing career: 2023–present

Career history
- 2023–present: Golden State Warriors
- 2023: →Santa Cruz Warriors

Career highlights
- NBA All-Rookie First Team (2024); WCC co-Player of the Year (2023); First-team All-WCC (2023); WCC Newcomer of the Year (2023); Wisconsin Mr. Basketball (2021)
- Stats at NBA.com
- Stats at Basketball Reference

Brandin Thomas Podziemski (/pəˈdʒɛmski/ pə-JEM-skee; born February 25, 2003) is an American professional basketball player for the Golden State Warriors of the National Basketball Association (NBA). A guard, he played college basketball for the Illinois Fighting Illini and the Santa Clara Broncos. Podziemski was chosen by the Warriors with the 19th pick in the 2023 NBA draft. He is nicknamed "Podz" and "The Pythagorean Theorem".

== Early life and high school career ==
Podziemski grew up in Greenfield, Wisconsin and attended St. John's Northwestern Military Academy. He was named first-team All-State after averaging 22.5 points and 9.3 rebounds per game as a sophomore with St. John's Northwestern Military Academy after not playing on the varsity team as a freshman at Muskego High School. Podziemski averaged 27.6 points and 9.2 rebounds and repeated as a first-team All-State selection during his junior season. He was named Wisconsin Mr. Basketball as a senior after averaging 35.1 points, ten rebounds, 5.6 assists, and four steals per game. Podziemski was also named the boys basketball Gatorade Player of the Year for Wisconsin in 2021. Podziemski was rated a four-star recruit and committed to playing college basketball for Illinois over offers from Kentucky, Miami (FL), Vanderbilt, and Wake Forest.

== College career ==
Podziemski began his college basketball career with the Illinois Fighting Illini. He played in 16 games as a freshman, all off the bench, and averaged 1.4 points per game. After the end of the season, Podziemski entered the NCAA transfer portal.

Podziemski ultimately transferred to Santa Clara. He entered his first season with the Broncos as the team's starting shooting guard. After scoring only 22 points during his entire season at Illinois, Podziemski scored 30 points with 9 rebounds and 5 steals in Santa Clara's season opener against Eastern Washington as the Broncos won 84–72. He scored 34 points and grabbed 11 rebounds in the following game against Georgia Southern. NABC First Team, USBWA All-District, and All-WCC First Team. Podziemski also earned WCC Player of the Week honors a SCU record four times, his 636 points was the fourth most in a season in program history, and his SCU three-point percentage was fourth-best in SCU program history. Podziemski was one of only three NCAA Division 1 men's basketball players to average 19, 8, and 3 in the 2022–23 season and finished 5th in the nation in three-point field goal percentage (43.8%).

Podziemski declared for the 2023 NBA draft while maintaining his eligibility. After taking part in the NBA Draft Combine and receiving positive feedback, he decided to remain in the draft.

== Professional career ==
The Golden State Warriors selected Podziemski with the nineteenth overall pick in the 2023 NBA draft. On July 3, 2023, the Warriors signed him to a contract. Podziemski plays the guard position.

On December 12, 2023, against the Phoenix Suns, Podziemski became the first Golden State Warriors rookie to have 20 or more points, 10 or more rebounds (11), and five or more assists in a single game since two-time NBA MVP Stephen Curry did so in the 2009–10 season. On May 21, 2024, Podziemski was announced on the NBA all-rookie first team. Before the Olympic Games, he was drafted to the USA Select Team alongside his teammate Trayce Jackson-Davis.

On December 28, 2024, during the Warriors' 109–105 win over the Phoenix Suns, Podziemski suffered an abdominal injury in the second quarter. He missed 12 straight games due to the injury. Podziemski returned on January 23, 2025, recording 10 points and four rebounds in a blowout win against the Chicago Bulls. On February 5, 2025, Podziemski tallied a then career-high 29 points, along with six rebounds and four assists, in a 131–128 loss to the Utah Jazz. On February 8, the NBA announced that Podziemski would play in their Rising Stars game as an injury replacement player for Cason Wallace. On February 23, Podziemski recorded 17 points along with a then career-high 13 rebounds in a 126–102 win over the Dallas Mavericks, notching his first double-double of the season. On May 14, he scored a playoff career-high 28 points in a 121–110 closeout loss to the Minnesota Timberwolves in Game 5 of the Conference Semifinals.

On May 28, 2025, Podziemski underwent a successful left wrist debridement surgery. On June 12, Podziemski underwent an additional surgery to repair a core muscle injury. On April 10, 2026, Podziemski recorded a career-high 30 points in a 124–118 loss to the Sacramento Kings. He appeared in all 82 games (starting 44) for Golden State during the 2025–26 season, averaging 13.8 points, 5.1 rebounds, and 3.7 assists.

== Personal life ==
Podziemski is of Polish descent and has expressed interest in obtaining Polish citizenship in order to play for the Poland national team. He is being recruited to the team by member Jeremy Sochan.

== Career statistics ==
Legend
GP	Games played	GS	Games started	MPG	Minutes per game
FG%	Field goal percentage	3P%	3-point field goal percentage	FT%	Free throw percentage
RPG	Rebounds per game	APG	Assists per game	SPG	Steals per game
BPG	Blocks per game	PPG	Points per game	**Bold**	Career high
*	Led the league

=== NBA ===
==== Regular season ====
Year	Team	GP	GS	MPG	FG%	3P%	FT%	RPG	APG	SPG	BPG	PPG
2023–24	Golden State	74	28	26.6	.454	**.385**	.633	**5.8**	**3.7**	.8	**.2**	9.2
2024–25	Golden State	64	33	26.8	.445	.372	.758	5.1	3.4	**1.1**	**.2**	11.7
2025–26	Golden State	**82***	**43**	**28.5**	**.455**	.371	**.797**	5.1	**3.7**	**1.1**	**.2**	**13.8**
Career		220	104	27.4	.452	.375	.757	5.3	3.6	1.0	.2	11.6

==== Playoffs ====
Year	Team	GP	GS	MPG	FG%	3P%	FT%	RPG	APG	SPG	BPG	PPG
2025	Golden State	12	11	32.1	.364	.328	.708	5.0	3.1	1.3	.2	11.3
Career		12	11	32.1	.364	.328	.708	5.0	3.1	1.3	.2	11.3

=== College ===
Year	Team	GP	GS	MPG	FG%	3P%	FT%	RPG	APG	SPG	BPG	PPG
2021–22	Illinois	16	0	4.3	.421	.231	.750	.9	.3	.1	.0	1.4
2022–23	Santa Clara	**32**	**32**	**36.0**	**.483**	**.438**	**.771**	**8.8**	**3.7**	**1.8**	**.5**	**19.9**
Career		48	32	25.4	.480	.424	.770	6.1	2.5	1.2	.3	13.7
