= Pat Spencer =

American basketball player (born 1996)

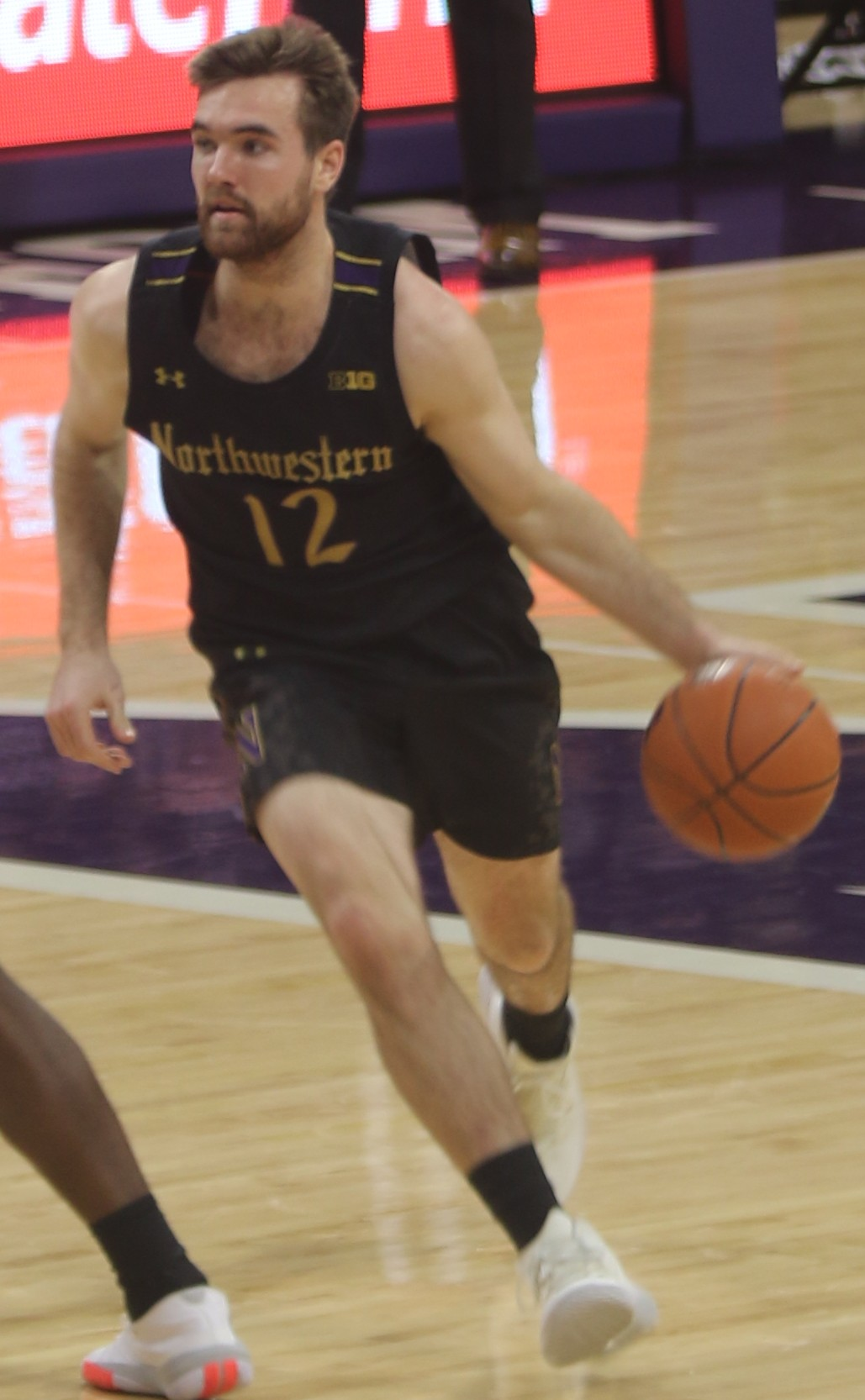
- Spencer with the Northwestern Wildcats in 2020

No. 61 – Phoenix Suns
- Position: Point guard / shooting guard
- League: NBA

Personal information
- Born: July 4, 1996 (age 30) Davidsonville, Maryland, U.S.
- Listed height: 6 ft 2 in (1.88 m)
- Listed weight: 205 lb (93 kg)

Career information
- High school: Boys' Latin School of Maryland (Baltimore, Maryland)
- College: Northwestern (2019–2020)
- NBA draft: 2020: undrafted
- Playing career: 2021–present

Career history
- 2021: Hamburg Towers
- 2021–2022: Capital City Go-Go
- 2022–2024: Santa Cruz Warriors
- 2024–2026: Golden State Warriors
- 2024–2025: →Santa Cruz Warriors
- 2026–present: Phoenix Suns
- 2026–present: →Valley Suns
- Stats at NBA.com
- Stats at Basketball Reference

Patrick Andrew Spencer (born July 4, 1996) is an American professional basketball player for the Phoenix Suns of the National Basketball Association (NBA), on a two-way contract with the Valley Suns of the NBA G League. He played college lacrosse for the Loyola Greyhounds, where he set the NCAA men's lacrosse record for career assists (231) and is considered one of the greatest college lacrosse players of all time. He also played one year of college basketball for the Northwestern Wildcats.

== High school career ==
Spencer is from Davidsonville, Maryland. Spencer attended Boys' Latin School of Maryland, where he played both lacrosse and basketball. He earned four varsity letters for basketball and lacrosse. He was a US Lacrosse High school All-American, and he played for the Under Armour Underclass All-American Team Baltimore in 2014. He scored 30 goals and had 30 assists as a junior, and 49 goals and 51 assists as a senior.. In basketball, as a senior, he averaged 14.3 points, 8.1 rebounds, 6.1 assists and 2.3 steals per game. Prior to his junior year, Spencer grew from 5-foot-6 to 6-foot-2.

== College career ==
=== Lacrosse ===
During Spencer's four years at Loyola, the team compiled a record of 49 wins and 19 losses, with the 2016 squad compiling a 14–4 record and reaching the NCAA Final Four.

Spencer holds the College Lacrosse record for career assists with 231 assists, as well as the Patriot League record for career points with 380. Spencer received the Lt. Raymond Enners Award as the USILA national player of the year and the Jack Turnbull Award as the nation's top attackman in 2019. Spencer also received the Tewaaraton Award, regarded as the Heisman Trophy for NCAA DI lacrosse, as a senior.

As a senior on attack he also ranked second on the all-time points list behind Lyle Thompson. He was a four-time All-American. At Loyola, his head coach was Charley Toomey. In his first two collegiate games he scored eight combined points in wins over Virginia and Johns Hopkins University. In 2016 he took league first-team honoree for rookie-of-the-year trophy. He graduated from Loyola with a Bachelor of Business Finance.

In an interview hosted by Paul Carcaterra, an ESPN lacrosse game analyst and sideline reporter, Carcaterra talked to Pat Spencer about college lacrosse and his background in basketball. Paul asks, "How big of an impact has hoops had on your lacrosse career". Pat responded, "Definitely a big impact, I think any time you play another sport a lot of it translates over". Later in the video, when Paul and Pat were shooting hoops, Spencer added, "Basketball and lacrosse are very similar, in terms of spacing and trying to draw a guy and find your open teammates".

Spencer was selected by the Archers Lacrosse Club as the first overall pick in the 2019 Premier Lacrosse League collegiate draft. He did not dress or practice with the team, opting instead to pursue a collegiate career in basketball upon graduating from Loyola.

=== Basketball ===
Spencer used his college graduate year eligibility to play basketball at Northwestern University in the 2019–20 season. He averaged 10.4 points, 4.1 rebounds, and 3.9 assists per game. The season was cut short due to the onset of the COVID-19 pandemic.

== Professional basketball career ==
=== Hamburg Towers (2021) ===
In April 2021, Spencer joined Hamburg Towers of the German Basketball Bundesliga for the rest of the 2020–21 season. In eight games, he averaged 7.0 points, 3.0 rebounds and 1.1 assists per game.

=== Capital City Go-Go (2021–2022) ===
In October 2021, Spencer joined the Capital City Go-Go of the NBA G League for the 2021–22 season. In 26 games, he averaged 6.0 points, 2.1 rebounds and 2.2 assists per game.

Spencer played for the Washington Wizards during the 2022 NBA Summer League.

=== Santa Cruz Warriors (2022–2024) ===
On July 25, 2022, Spencer signed an Exhibit 10 contract with the Golden State Warriors. He was later waived on October 15. He subsequently joined the Santa Cruz Warriors for the 2022–23 NBA G League season. He appeared in just nine games for Santa Cruz, averaging 10.8 points, 6.1 rebounds and 4.8 assists per game.

On November 29, 2023, Spencer rejoined Santa Cruz.

=== Golden State Warriors (2024–2026) ===
On February 22, 2024, Spencer signed a two-way contract with Golden State. He made his NBA debut three days later against the Denver Nuggets. He appeared in six games for Golden State to finish the 2023–24 season, averaging 0.7 points, 0.7 rebounds, and 0.8 assists. In 45 games for Santa Cruz during the 2023–24 NBA G League season, he averaged 13.0 points, 5.0 rebounds, 3.8 assists and 1.1 steals per game.

Spencer joined Golden State for the 2024 NBA Summer League. He continued with the Warriors for the 2024–25 season. On January 10, 2025, he scored a season-high 17 points in a 108–96 loss to the Indiana Pacers. On March 4, 2025, his two-way contract with the Warriors was converted into a standard NBA contract. In 47 games for Golden State in 2024–25, he averaged 2.9 points, 1.2 rebounds and 1.1 assists per game. He also appeared in six games for Santa Cruz, averaging 18.0 points, 6.5 rebounds, 6.0 assists and 2.2 steals per game.

On September 29, 2025, Spencer signed a new two-way contract with the Warriors, ahead of the 2025–26 season. In early December 2025, he received increased playing time due to injuries to key players, including Stephen Curry. He responded by averaging 15.2 points and 5.4 assists during a five-game span. On December 6, he made his first career NBA start, posting 19 points and seven assists in a 99–94 win against the Cleveland Cavaliers. Following the game, head coach Steve Kerr stated in response to questions related to his first start that "his coach realized that Pat is that motherfucker", referencing Spencer's own comments made about himself during a game against the Philadelphia 76ers two days earlier. On February 5, 2026, he scored a career-high 20 points in a 101–97 win over the Phoenix Suns. Two days later, Spencer's two-way contract was converted into a standard contract.

=== Phoenix Suns (2026–present) ===
On July 4, 2026, Spencer signed a two-way contract with the Phoenix Suns.

== Career statistics ==
=== NBA ===
Legend
GP	Games played	GS	Games started	MPG	Minutes per game
FG%	Field goal percentage	3P%	3-point field goal percentage	FT%	Free throw percentage
RPG	Rebounds per game	APG	Assists per game	SPG	Steals per game
BPG	Blocks per game	PPG	Points per game	**Bold**	Career high

==== Regular season ====
Year	Team	GP	GS	MPG	FG%	3P%	FT%	RPG	APG	SPG	BPG	PPG
2023–24	Golden State	6	0	4.3	**.500**	.000	—	.7	.8	.0	.0	.7
2024–25	Golden State	39	0	6.4	.406	.227	.733	1.2	1.2	.4	**.1**	2.5
2025–26	Golden State	**66**	**14**	**18.6**	.427	**.357**	**.772**	**2.4**	**3.5**	**.7**	**.1**	**7.2**
Career		111	14	13.6	.423	.339	.764	1.9	2.6	.6	.1	5.2

=== NBA G League ===
==== Showcase Cup ====
Year	Team	GP	GS	MPG	FG%	3P%	FT%	RPG	APG	SPG	BPG	PPG
2021–22	Capital City	**9**	0	11.8	.294	.250	.750	1.6	2.2	1.0	**.3**	3.1
2022–23	Santa Cruz	5	**5**	31.8	.441	.308	**1.000**	7.4	5.2	.4	.0	13.6
2023–24	Santa Cruz	**9**	0	14.8	**.595**	**.412**	.500	3.0	2.9	.7	.1	6.7
2024–25	Santa Cruz	3	3	**32.0**	.366	.353	.800	**7.7**	**6.0**	**2.0**	.0	**14.0**
Career		26	8	19.0	.432	.345	.800	3.9	3.5	.9	.2	7.6

==== Regular season ====
Year	Team	GP	GS	MPG	FG%	3P%	FT%	RPG	APG	SPG	BPG	PPG
2021–22	Capital City	15	0	14.5	**.592**	**.467**	.813	2.5	1.8	.9	**.4**	7.5
2022–23	Santa Cruz	4	0	21.8	.333	.200	.600	4.5	4.3	1.0	.0	7.3
2023–24	Santa Cruz	**34**	**3**	27.4	.449	.329	.911	**5.5**	3.9	1.2	**.4**	14.2
2024–25	Santa Cruz	3	3	**31.7**	.451	.400	**1.000**	5.3	**6.0**	**2.3**	.0	**22.0**
Career		56	6	23.8	.461	.343	.885	4.6	3.5	1.1	.3	12.4

==== Playoffs ====
Year	Team	GP	GS	MPG	FG%	3P%	FT%	RPG	APG	SPG	BPG	PPG
2022	Capital City	1	0	21.0	.400	.000	**1.000**	2.0	**8.0**	1.0	.0	12.0
2024	Santa Cruz	**2**	0	**30.5**	**.500**	**.600**	.667	**5.0**	5.0	**2.0**	.0	**20.0**
Career		3	0	27.3	.474	.462	.750	4.0	6.0	1.7	.0	17.3

==== Exhibition ====
Year	Team	GP	GS	MPG	FG%	3P%	FT%	RPG	APG	SPG	BPG	PPG
2022	Capital City	1	0	17.0	.250	–	–	1.0	2.0	0.0	.0	2.0

=== College ===
Year	Team	GP	GS	MPG	FG%	3P%	FT%	RPG	APG	SPG	BPG	PPG
2019–20	Northwestern	31	29	29.4	.436	.235	.815	4.1	3.9	.8	.2	10.4

=== Loyola University Lacrosse ===
Season	GP	G	A	Pts	PPG
2016	18	37	52	89	4.94
2017	16	28	55	83	5.19
2018	17	35	59	94	5.53
2019	17	49	65	114 ^{(a)}	6.71
Totals	61	149	231 ^{(b)}	380 ^{(c)}	5.18

^{(a)} 8th in Division I single-season points
^{(b)} 1st in Division I career assists
^{(c)} 4th in Division I career points

== Personal life ==
Spencer's younger brother, Cam, played college basketball for the Loyola Greyhounds, the Rutgers Scarlet Knights, and the UConn Huskies with whom he won the 2024 national championship. He was drafted with the 53rd pick of the 2024 NBA draft by the Detroit Pistons before his rights were traded to the Memphis Grizzlies.

== See also ==
- 2016 NCAA Division I Men's Lacrosse Championship
- Loyola Greyhounds men's lacrosse
