= NBA play-in tournament =

Professional basketball post-season games

- The logo used from 2020 to 2022. SoFi later took over sponsorship rights from AT&T.

Tournament information
- Sport: Basketball
- Established: 2020
- Format: Page playoff system
- Teams: 8 total; 4 per conference
- Broadcast: United States: Amazon Prime Video; Canada: TSN; Sportsnet

The NBA play-in tournament is the annual preliminary National Basketball Association (NBA) postseason tournament. It determines the final two playoff seeds in the Eastern Conference and Western Conference and is played immediately prior to the NBA playoffs, which is the main tournament of the postseason and regarded by the league as separate from the play-in tournament. Teams finishing the regular season in positions 7 through 10 in the standings for each conference compete to determine the number 7 and 8 seeds in each conference's bracket tournament.

== Format ==
=== Original format ===
On June 4, 2020, the NBA Board of Governors approved the first ever play-in game for the 2019–20 season. The game was part of the NBA's plans for a bubble as part of its return to play during the COVID-19 pandemic. If the 8 and 9 seeds in either conference were within four games of each other, the two seeds would play each other in up to two play-in games. If the 8 seed won the first game, it would advance to the playoffs. If the 9 seed won the first game, a second game would be played. The winner of the second game would advance to the playoffs.

=== Current format ===
On November 19, 2020, the NBA Board of Governors approved a format for the 2020–21 season to have a playoff play-in tournament involving the teams that ranked 7th through 10th in each conference. On July 22, 2022, the NBA Board of Governors made this format permanent.

The format is similar to the first two rounds of the Page–McIntyre system for a four-team playoff. The 9th-place team hosts the 10th-place team, with the loser being eliminated. The 7th place team hosts the 8th place team in the double-chance game, with the winner advancing as the new 7-seed. The loser of the 7/8 game hosts the winner of the 9/10 game, with the winner receiving the new 8-seed. The NBA's regular playoff format then proceeds as normal. Furthermore, the winner of the match between the loser of the 7/8 game and the winner of the 9/10 game always plays on day 2 of the NBA playoffs to allow that team at least a day of rest.

The current bracket structure in each conference is as follows:

Play-in games
7th	place team	Home
8th	place team	Away
9th	place team	Home
10th	place team	Away

No. 8 seed game
7/8	Loser of 7/8 game	Home
9/10	Winner of 9/10 game	Away

Final seeds
7/8	Winner of 7/8 game	No. 7 seed
7/8/9/10	Winner of No. 8 seed game	No. 8 seed

== Statistics ==
The Miami Heat have played seven play-in games, the most games played by a team in the play-in tournament, and also have the most wins, with four.

Due to the current structure of the NBA playoff system, one division winner is no longer guaranteed a playoff spot, let alone a top-four placing. To date, only two teams have qualified for the play-in tournament as division champions: the 2022–23 Miami Heat and the 2024–25 Orlando Magic, both from the Southeast Division. Both teams eventually qualified for the playoffs via the play-in tournament.

The 2022–23 Miami Heat had the best performance by any play-in team in the playoffs after reaching the 2023 NBA Finals.

Jayson Tatum set the record for most points in a single play-in tournament game by scoring 50 points against Washington on May 18, 2021.

Since the inception of the 7–10 seed Page–McIntyre play-in format in 2021, the 7 seed has always made it out of the play-in and into the playoffs, while only one 10th seed (the 2024–25 Miami Heat) has done so.

=== Results by position ===
The below table shows teams' results per their conference position entering the play-in tournament, since the NBA adopted the current format in 2021.

Regular season position	Record by game		Resulting playoff seed		
Regular season position	Play-in game	No. 8 seed game	7th seed	8th seed	Did not advance
7	9–3	3–0	9	3	0
8	3–9	5–4	3	5	4
9	7–5	3–4	—N/a	3	9
10	5–7	1–4	—N/a	1	11

Eastern Conference	Record by game		Resulting playoff seed		
Eastern Conference	Play-in game	No. 8 seed game	7th seed	8th seed	Did not advance
7	5–1	1–0	5	1	0
8	1–5	3–2	1	3	2
9	4–2	1–3	—N/a	1	5
10	2–4	1–1	—N/a	1	5

Western Conference	Record by game		Resulting playoff seed		
Western Conference	Play-in game	No. 8 seed game	7th seed	8th seed	Did not advance
7	4–2	2–0	4	2	0
8	2–4	2–2	2	2	2
9	3–3	2–1	—N/a	2	4
10	3–3	0–3	—N/a	0	6

== Results ==
Note: Times are EDT (UTC−4) as listed by NBA. If the venue is located in a different time zone, the local time is also given.

=== 2020 ===
The only play-in game was in the Western Conference, between ninth-place Memphis (34–39) and eighth-place Portland (35–39), who finished the season a half game ahead of Memphis. Because ninth-place Washington (25–47) finished 7 1/2 games behind eighth-place Orlando (33–40), there was no Eastern Conference play-in game.

ABC

August 15
2:30 PM

Recap

(9) Memphis Grizzlies 122, (8) Portland Trail Blazers 126
Scoring by quarter: 19–31, 33–27, 42–31, 28–37
Pts: Ja Morant 35; Rebs: Jonas Valančiūnas 17; Asts: Kyle Anderson 9	Pts: Damian Lillard 31; Rebs: Jusuf Nurkić 21; Asts: Damian Lillard 10

HP Field House, Bay Lake, FL
Referees: James Capers, Pat Fraher, Tony Brown

=== 2021 ===
Eastern Conference bracket

Play-in games
7	Boston	118
8	Washington	100
9	Indiana	144
10	Charlotte	117

No. 8 seed game
8	Washington	142
9	Indiana	115

Final seeds
7	Boston	No. 7 seed
8	Washington	No. 8 seed

Bold Game winner
Italic Team with home-court advantage

Western Conference bracket

Play-in games
7	LA Lakers	103
8	Golden State	100
9	Memphis	100
10	San Antonio	96

No. 8 seed game
8	Golden State	112
9	Memphis	117 (OT)

Final seeds
7	LA Lakers	No. 7 seed
9	Memphis	No. 8 seed

Bold Game winner
Italic Team with home-court advantage

May 18	(10) Charlotte Hornets	117–144	(9) Indiana Pacers	Bankers Life Fieldhouse, Indianapolis, IN
6:30 PM	Scoring by quarter: 24–40, 21–29, 33–39, 39–36
TNT	Pts: Miles Bridges 23; Rebs: Bridges, Rozier 8 each Asts: Terry Rozier 6	Recap	Pts: Oshae Brissett 23; Rebs: Domantas Sabonis 21; Asts: Domantas Sabonis 9	Referees: Tony Brothers, Eric Lewis, Curtis Blair, Derrick Collins

May 18	(8) Washington Wizards	100–118	(7) Boston Celtics	TD Garden, Boston, MA
9:00 PM	Scoring by quarter: 21–27, 33–25, 26–38, 20–28
TNT	Pts: Bradley Beal 22; Rebs: Russell Westbrook 14; Asts: Russell Westbrook 9	Recap	Pts: Jayson Tatum 50; Rebs: Tristan Thompson 12; Asts: Marcus Smart 6	Attendance: 4,789; Referees: Rodney Mott, Scott Foster, James Williams

May 19	(10) San Antonio Spurs	96–100	(9) Memphis Grizzlies	FedExForum, Memphis, TN
7:30 PM (6:30 PM CDT)	Scoring by quarter: 19–38, 30–18, 16–16, 31–28
ESPN	Pts: DeRozan, Gay 20 each Rebs: Dejounte Murray 13; Asts: Dejounte Murray 11	Recap	Pts: Dillon Brooks 24; Rebs: Jonas Valančiūnas 23; Asts: Ja Morant 9	Attendance: 7,019; Referees: Marc Davis, Mark Lindsay, Sean Wright, Karl Lane

May 19	(8) Golden State Warriors	100–103	(7) Los Angeles Lakers	Staples Center, Los Angeles, CA
10:00 PM (7:00 PM PDT)	Scoring by quarter: 28–22, 27–20, 24–35, 21–26
ESPN	Pts: Stephen Curry 37; Rebs: Kevon Looney 13; Asts: Draymond Green 8	Recap	Pts: Anthony Davis 25; Rebs: Anthony Davis 12; Asts: LeBron James 10	Attendance: 6,022; Referees: Josh Tiven, Brian Forte, John Goble, Tre Maddox

May 20	(9) Indiana Pacers	115–142	(8) Washington Wizards	Capital One Arena, Washington, D.C.
8:00 PM	Scoring by quarter: 29–30, 23–36, 31–48, 32–28
TNT	Pts: Malcolm Brogdon 24; Rebs: Domantas Sabonis 11; Asts: Domantas Sabonis 10	Recap	Pts: Bradley Beal 25; Rebs: Daniel Gafford 13; Asts: Russell Westbrook 15	Referees: Courtney Kirkland, David Guthrie, Ben Taylor, Michael Smith

May 21	(9) Memphis Grizzlies	117–112(OT)	(8) Golden State Warriors	Chase Center, San Francisco, CA
9:00 PM (6:00 PM PDT)	Scoring by quarter: 30–29, 32–20, 16–24, 21–26, Overtime: 18–13
ESPN	Pts: Ja Morant 35; Rebs: Jonas Valančiūnas 12; Asts: Anderson, Morant 6 each	Recap	Pts: Stephen Curry 39; Rebs: Draymond Green 16; Asts: Draymond Green 10	Attendance: 7,505; Referees: James Williams, Scott Foster, Karl Lane, Eric Lewis

=== 2022 ===
Eastern Conference bracket

Play-in games
7	Brooklyn	115
8	Cleveland	108
9	Atlanta	132
10	Charlotte	103

No. 8 seed game
8	Cleveland	101
9	Atlanta	107

Final seeds
7	Brooklyn	No. 7 seed
9	Atlanta	No. 8 seed

Bold Game winner
Italic Team with home-court advantage

Western Conference bracket

Play-in games
7	Minnesota	109
8	LA Clippers	104
9	New Orleans	113
10	San Antonio	103

No. 8 seed game
8	LA Clippers	101
9	New Orleans	105

Final seeds
7	Minnesota	No. 7 seed
9	New Orleans	No. 8 seed

Bold Game winner
Italic Team with home-court advantage

April 12	(8) Cleveland Cavaliers	108–115	(7) Brooklyn Nets	Barclays Center, Brooklyn, NY
7:00 PM	Scoring by quarter: 20–40, 23–17, 30–28, 35–30
TNT	Pts: Darius Garland 34; Rebs: Kevin Love 13; Asts: Rajon Rondo 9	Recap	Pts: Kyrie Irving 34; Rebs: Brown, Claxton 9 each Asts: Kyrie Irving 12	Attendance: 17,732; Referees: JB DeRosa, Curtis Blair, Kane Fitzgerald, Tyler Ford

April 12	(8) Los Angeles Clippers	122–126	(7) Minnesota Timberwolves	Target Center, Minneapolis, MN
9:30 PM (8:30 PM CDT)	Scoring by quarter: 26–20, 25–33, 33–25, 20–31
TNT	Pts: Paul George 34; Rebs: Ivica Zubac 9 Asts: George, Jackson 5 each	Recap	Pts: Anthony Edwards 30; Rebs: Patrick Beverley 11; Asts: Beverley, Towns 3 each	Attendance: 17,136; Referees: Scott Foster, Tom Washington, Ed Malloy, Justin Van Duyne

April 13	(10) Charlotte Hornets	103–132	(9) Atlanta Hawks	State Farm Arena, Atlanta, GA
7:00 PM	Scoring by quarter: 23–32, 29–28, 24–42, 27–30
ESPN	Pts: LaMelo Ball 26; Rebs: Martin, Washington 6 each Asts: LaMelo Ball 8	Recap	Pts: Trae Young 24; Rebs: Clint Capela 17; Asts: Trae Young 11	Attendance: 18,137; Referees: James Capers, James Williams, Jacyn Goble

April 13	(10) San Antonio Spurs	103–113	(9) New Orleans Pelicans	Smoothie King Center, New Orleans, LA
9:30 PM (8:30 PM CDT)	Scoring by quarter: 22–26, 28–35, 25–31, 28–21
ESPN	Pts: Devin Vassell 23; Rebs: Murray, Poeltl 9 each Asts: Dejounte Murray 5	Recap	Pts: CJ McCollum 32; Rebs: Jonas Valančiūnas 14; Asts: CJ McCollum 7	Attendance: 18,610; Referees: Bill Kennedy, David Guthrie, Sean Wright

April 15	(9) Atlanta Hawks	107–101	(8) Cleveland Cavaliers	Rocket Mortgage FieldHouse, Cleveland, OH
7:30 PM	Scoring by quarter: 25–36, 26–25, 33–23, 23–17
ESPN	Pts: Trae Young 38; Rebs: Onyeka Okongwu 9 Asts: Trae Young 9	Recap	Pts: Lauri Markkanen 26; Rebs: Markkanen, Mobley 8 each Asts: Darius Garland 9	Attendance: 19,432; Referees: Zach Zarba, Eric Lewis, Tre Maddox, Ben Taylor

April 15	(9) New Orleans Pelicans	105–101	(8) Los Angeles Clippers	Crypto.com Arena, Los Angeles, CA
10:00 PM (7:00 PM PDT)	Scoring by quarter: 30–22, 26–24, 18–38, 31–17
TNT	Pts: Brandon Ingram 30; Rebs: Larry Nance Jr. 16; Asts: Brandon Ingram 6	Recap	Pts: Markieff Morris 27; Rebs: Nicolas Batum 10; Asts: Reggie Jackson 6	Attendance: 19,068; Referees: Marc Davis, Brian Forte, Mark Lindsay, Josh Tiven

=== 2023 ===
Eastern Conference bracket

Play-in games
7	Miami	105
8	Atlanta	116
9	Toronto	105
10	Chicago	109

No. 8 seed game
7	Miami	102
10	Chicago	91

Final seeds
8	Atlanta	No. 7 seed
7	Miami	No. 8 seed

Bold Game winner
Italic Team with home-court advantage

Western Conference bracket

Play-in games
7	LA Lakers	108 (OT)
8	Minnesota	102
9	New Orleans	118
10	Oklahoma City	123

No. 8 seed game
8	Minnesota	120
10	Oklahoma City	95

Final seeds
7	LA Lakers	No. 7 seed
8	Minnesota	No. 8 seed

Bold Game winner
Italic Team with home-court advantage

April 11	(8) Atlanta Hawks	116–105	(7) Miami Heat	Kaseya Center, Miami, FL
7:30 PM	Scoring by quarter: 36–27, 29–23, 26–28, 25–27
TNT	Pts: Trae Young 25; Rebs: Clint Capela 21; Asts: Trae Young 7	Recap	Pts: Kyle Lowry 33; Rebs: Bam Adebayo 9 Asts: Jimmy Butler 9	Attendance: 19,662; Referees: JB DeRosa, Sean Wright, John Goble

April 11	(8) Minnesota Timberwolves	102–108(OT)	(7) Los Angeles Lakers	Crypto.com Arena, Los Angeles, CA
10:00 PM (7:00 PM PDT)	Scoring by quarter: 28–22, 32–27, 26–30, 12–19, Overtime: 4–10
TNT	Pts: Karl-Anthony Towns 24; Rebs: Karl-Anthony Towns 11; Asts: Kyle Anderson 13	Recap	Pts: LeBron James 30; Rebs: Anthony Davis 15; Asts: D'Angelo Russell 8	Attendance: 18,997; Referees: Michael Smith, David Guthrie, Tre Maddox, Tyler Ford

April 12	(10) Chicago Bulls	109–105	(9) Toronto Raptors	Scotiabank Arena, Toronto, ON
7:00 PM	Scoring by quarter: 23–28, 24–30, 25–23, 37–24
ESPN	Pts: Zach LaVine 39; Rebs: Nikola Vučević 13; Asts: Coby White 5	Recap	Pts: Pascal Siakam 32; Rebs: Fred VanVleet 12; Asts: Fred VanVleet 8	Attendance: 19,800; Referees: Kevin Scott, James Williams, Mitchell Ervin, Ray Acosta

April 12	(10) Oklahoma City Thunder	123–118	(9) New Orleans Pelicans	Smoothie King Center, New Orleans, LA
9:30 PM (8:30 PM CDT)	Scoring by quarter: 32–29, 25–34, 39–24, 27–31
ESPN	Pts: Shai Gilgeous-Alexander 32; Rebs: Josh Giddey 9 Asts: Josh Giddey 10	Recap	Pts: Brandon Ingram 30; Rebs: Jonas Valančiūnas 18; Asts: Brandon Ingram 7	Attendance: 18,715; Referees: Sean Corbin, Eric Lewis, Eric Dalen, Ben Taylor

April 14	(10) Chicago Bulls	91–102	(7) Miami Heat	Kaseya Center, Miami, FL
7:00 PM	Scoring by quarter: 21–29, 23–20, 24–18, 23–35
TNT	Pts: DeMar DeRozan 26; Rebs: Nikola Vučević 9 Asts: DeMar DeRozan 9	Recap	Pts: Butler, Strus 31 each Rebs: Bam Adebayo 17; Asts: Tyler Herro 7	Attendance: 19,678; Referees: Tony Brothers, Josh Tiven, Karl Lane

April 14	(10) Oklahoma City Thunder	95–120	(8) Minnesota Timberwolves	Target Center, Minneapolis, MN
9:30 PM (8:30 PM CDT)	Scoring by quarter: 23–24, 24–33, 31–38, 17–25
ESPN	Pts: Shai Gilgeous-Alexander 22; Rebs: Luguentz Dort 8 Asts: Jal. Williams 5	Recap	Pts: Karl-Anthony Towns 28; Rebs: Karl-Anthony Towns 11; Asts: Alexander-Walker, Edwards 6 each	Attendance: 19,304; Referees: Scott Foster, Courtney Kirkland, Brent Barnaky, Gediminas Petraitis

=== 2024 ===
Eastern Conference bracket

Play-in games
7	Philadelphia	105
8	Miami	104
9	Chicago	131
10	Atlanta	116

No. 8 seed game
8	Miami	112
9	Chicago	91

Final seeds
7	Philadelphia	No. 7 seed
8	Miami	No. 8 seed

Bold Game winner
Italic Team with home-court advantage

Western Conference bracket

Play-in games
7	New Orleans	106
8	LA Lakers	110
9	Sacramento	118
10	Golden State	94

No. 8 seed game
7	New Orleans	105
9	Sacramento	98

Final seeds
8	LA Lakers	No. 7 seed
7	New Orleans	No. 8 seed

Bold Game winner
Italic Team with home-court advantage

April 16	(8) Los Angeles Lakers	110–106	(7) New Orleans Pelicans	Smoothie King Center, New Orleans, LA
7:30 PM (6:30 PM CDT)	Scoring by quarter: 26–34, 34–16, 23–26, 27–30
TNT	Pts: LeBron James 23; Rebs: Anthony Davis 15; Asts: LeBron James 9	Recap	Pts: Zion Williamson 40; Rebs: Larry Nance Jr. 12; Asts: Jose Alvarado 7	Attendance: 18,591; Referees: Scott Foster, Curtis Blair, Eric Dalen, Gediminas Petraitis

April 16	(10) Golden State Warriors	94–118	(9) Sacramento Kings	Golden 1 Center, Sacramento, CA
10:00 PM (7:00 PM PDT)	Scoring by quarter: 22–31, 28–23, 26–37, 18–27
TNT	Pts: Stephen Curry 22; Rebs: Brandin Podziemski 8 Asts: Draymond Green 6	Recap	Pts: Keegan Murray 32; Rebs: Domantas Sabonis 12; Asts: Domantas Sabonis 7	Attendance: 18,304; Referees: Mark Lindsay, Marat Kogut, James Williams, Aaron Smith

April 17	(8) Miami Heat	104–105	(7) Philadelphia 76ers	Wells Fargo Center, Philadelphia, PA
7:00 PM	Scoring by quarter: 23–22, 28–17, 23–30, 30–36
ESPN	Pts: Tyler Herro 25; Rebs: Bam Adebayo 12; Asts: Tyler Herro 9	Recap	Pts: Joel Embiid 23; Rebs: Joel Embiid 15; Asts: Hield, Maxey 6 each	Attendance: 19,788; Referees: Tony Brothers, Bill Kennedy, Mitchell Ervin

April 17	(10) Atlanta Hawks	116–131	(9) Chicago Bulls	United Center, Chicago, IL
9:30 PM (8:30 PM CDT)	Scoring by quarter: 22–40, 45–33, 25–37, 24–21
ESPN	Pts: Dejounte Murray 30; Rebs: Clint Capela 17; Asts: Trae Young 10	Recap	Pts: Coby White 42; Rebs: Nikola Vučević 12; Asts: DeMar DeRozan 9	Attendance: 21,627; Referees: Sean Corbin, Marc Davis, Nick Buchert, Tyler Ford

April 19	(9) Chicago Bulls	91–112	(8) Miami Heat	Kaseya Center, Miami, FL
7:00 PM	Scoring by quarter: 17–34, 20–13, 23–35, 31–30
ESPN	Pts: DeMar DeRozan 22; Rebs: Nikola Vučević 14; Asts: Nikola Vučević 5	Recap	Pts: Tyler Herro 24; Rebs: Tyler Herro 10; Asts: Tyler Herro 9	Attendance: 19,600; Referees: Zach Zarba, Sean Wright, Justin Van Duyne

April 19	(9) Sacramento Kings	98–105	(7) New Orleans Pelicans	Smoothie King Center, New Orleans, LA
9:30 PM (8:30 PM CDT)	Scoring by quarter: 24–22, 21–32, 29–29, 24–22
TNT	Pts: De'Aaron Fox 35; Rebs: Domantas Sabonis 14; Asts: Domantas Sabonis 7	Recap	Pts: Brandon Ingram 24; Rebs: Jonas Valančiūnas 12; Asts: Ingram, Murphy III 6 each	Attendance: 18,656; Referees: Courtney Kirkland, Josh Tiven, Karl Lane, J. T. Orr

=== 2025 ===
Eastern Conference bracket

Play-in games
7	Orlando*	120
8	Atlanta	95
9	Chicago	90
10	Miami	109

No. 8 seed game
8	Atlanta	114
10	Miami	123 (OT)

Final seeds
7	Orlando*	No. 7 seed
10	Miami	No. 8 seed

Bold Game winner
Italic Team with home-court advantage
* Division winner

Western Conference bracket

Play-in games
7	Golden State	121
8	Memphis	116
9	Sacramento	106
10	Dallas	120

No. 8 seed game
8	Memphis	120
10	Dallas	106

Final seeds
7	Golden State	No. 7 seed
8	Memphis	No. 8 seed

Bold Game winner
Italic Team with home-court advantage

April 15	(8) Atlanta Hawks	95–120	(7) Orlando Magic	Kia Center, Orlando, FL
7:30 PM	Scoring by quarter: 17–32, 30–29, 26–18, 22–41
TNT	Pts: Trae Young 28; Rebs: Dyson Daniels 12; Asts: Dyson Daniels 7	Recap	Pts: Cole Anthony 26; Rebs: Franz Wagner 13; Asts: Paolo Banchero 7	Attendance: 18,846; Referees: Sean Corbin, Pat Fraher, Karl Lane, James Williams

April 15	(8) Memphis Grizzlies	116–121	(7) Golden State Warriors	Chase Center, San Francisco, CA
10:00 PM (7:00 PM PDT)	Scoring by quarter: 25–31, 30–36, 36–27, 25–27
TNT	Pts: Desmond Bane 30; Rebs: Zach Edey 17; Asts: Scotty Pippen Jr. 5	Recap	Pts: LeBron James 30; Rebs: Anthony Davis 15; Asts: D'Angelo Russell 8	Attendance: 18,064; Referees: Bill Kennedy, Josh Tiven, Nick Buchert

April 16	(10) Miami Heat	109–90	(9) Chicago Bulls	United Center, Chicago, IL
7:30 PM (6:30 PM CDT)	Scoring by quarter: 39–20, 32–19, 17–27, 21–16
ESPN	Pts: Tyler Herro 38; Rebs: Bam Adebayo 12; Asts: Davion Mitchell 9	Recap	Pts: Josh Giddey 25; Rebs: Josh Giddey 10; Asts: Coby White 5	Attendance: 21,380; Referees: Zach Zarba, Curtis Blair, Justin Van Duyne, Jacyn Goble

April 16	(10) Dallas Mavericks	120–106	(9) Sacramento Kings	Golden 1 Center, Sacramento, CA
10:00 PM (7:00 PM PDT)	Scoring by quarter: 27–29, 44–19, 28–33, 21–25
ESPN	Pts: Anthony Davis 27; Rebs: Davis, Washington 9 each Asts: Danté Exum 6	Recap	Pts: DeMar DeRozan 33; Rebs: Domantas Sabonis 13; Asts: Zach LaVine 9	Attendance: 17,939; Referees: JB DeRosa, Marc Davis, Brian Forte, Ben Taylor

April 18	(10) Miami Heat	123–114(OT)	(8) Atlanta Hawks	State Farm Arena, Atlanta, GA
7:00 PM	Scoring by quarter: 33–24, 29–29, 24–24, 20–29, Overtime: 17–8
TNT	Pts: Tyler Herro 30; Rebs: Bam Adebayo 11; Asts: Andrew Wiggins 8	Recap	Pts: Trae Young 29; Rebs: Onyeka Okongwu 12; Asts: Trae Young 11	Attendance: 17,690; Referees: James Capers, Ed Malloy, Mitchell Ervin

April 18	(10) Dallas Mavericks	106–120	(8) Memphis Grizzlies	FedExForum, Memphis, TN
9:30 PM (8:30 PM CDT)	Scoring by quarter: 24–39, 25-27, 29–30, 28–24
ESPN	Pts: Anthony Davis 40; Rebs: Anthony Davis 9 Asts: Brandon Williams 7	Recap	Pts: Jaren Jackson Jr. 24; Rebs: Zach Edey 11; Asts: Ja Morant 9	Attendance: 17,794; Referees: Courtney Kirkland, David Guthrie, Sean Wright, Ray Acosta

=== 2026 ===
Eastern Conference bracket

Play-in games
7	Philadelphia	109
8	Orlando	97
9	Charlotte	127 (OT)
10	Miami	126

No. 8 seed game
8	Orlando	121
9	Charlotte	90

Final seeds
7	Philadelphia	No. 7 seed
8	Orlando	No. 8 seed

Bold Game winner
Italic Team with home-court advantage

Western Conference bracket

Play-in games
7	Phoenix	110
8	Portland	114
9	LA Clippers	121
10	Golden State	126

No. 8 seed game
7	Phoenix	111
10	Golden State	96

Final seeds
8	Portland	No. 7 seed
7	Phoenix	No. 8 seed

Bold Game winner
Italic Team with home-court advantage

April 14	(10) Miami Heat	126–127(OT)	(9) Charlotte Hornets	Spectrum Center, Charlotte, NC
7:30 PM	Scoring by quarter: 24–26, 30–26, 29–37, 31–25, Overtime: 12–13
Prime	Pts: Davion Mitchell 28; Rebs: Kel'el Ware 19; Asts: Jaime Jaquez Jr. 8	Recap	Pts: LaMelo Ball 30; Rebs: Moussa Diabaté 15; Asts: LaMelo Ball 10	Attendance: 19,698; Referees: Zach Zarba, Curtis Blair, Gediminas Petraitis, Natalie Sago

April 14	(8) Portland Trail Blazers	114–110	(7) Phoenix Suns	Mortgage Matchup Center, Phoenix, AZ
10:00 PM (7:00 PM MST)	Scoring by quarter: 31–33, 34–29, 18–20, 31–28
Prime	Pts: Deni Avdija 41; Rebs: Donovan Clingan 11; Asts: Deni Avdija 12	Recap	Pts: Jalen Green 35; Rebs: Royce O'Neale 8 Asts: Oso Ighodaro 6	Attendance: 17,071; Referees: James Capers, Nick Buchert, Ray Acosta, Eric Dalen

April 15	(8) Orlando Magic	97–109	(7) Philadelphia 76ers	Xfinity Mobile Arena, Philadelphia, PA
7:30 PM	Scoring by quarter: 24–28, 31–31, 19–20, 23–30
Prime	Pts: Desmond Bane 34; Rebs: Wendell Carter Jr. 11; Asts: Banchero, Suggs 4 each	Recap	Pts: Tyrese Maxey 31; Rebs: V. J. Edgecombe 11; Asts: Tyrese Maxey 6	Attendance: 19,746; Referees: Tony Brothers, Tyler Ford, Andy Nagy

April 15	(10) Golden State Warriors	126–121	(9) Los Angeles Clippers	Intuit Dome, Inglewood, CA
10:00 PM (7:00 PM PDT)	Scoring by quarter: 22–31, 31–30, 30–28, 43–32
Prime	Pts: Stephen Curry 35; Rebs: Santos, Podziemski 7 each Asts: Draymond Green 9	Recap	Pts: Bennedict Mathurin 23; Rebs: John Collins 9 Asts: Kris Dunn 10	Attendance: 17,927; Referees: James Williams, Ben Taylor, Karl Lane, Sean Corbin

April 17	(9) Charlotte Hornets	90–121	(8) Orlando Magic	Kia Center, Orlando, FL
7:30 PM	Scoring by quarter: 16–38, 21–30, 34–34, 19–19
Prime	Pts: LaMelo Ball 23; Rebs: Moussa Diabaté 8 Asts: LaMelo Ball 5	Recap	Pts: Paolo Banchero 25; Rebs: Bane, Wagner 7 each Asts: Banchero, Suggs, Wagner 6 each	Attendance: 19,005; Referees: Marat Kogut, Marc Davis, Sean Wright, Justin Van Duyne

April 17	(10) Golden State Warriors	96–111	(7) Phoenix Suns	Mortgage Matchup Center, Phoenix, AZ
10:00 PM (7:00 PM MST)	Scoring by quarter: 15–33, 30–17, 24–28, 27–33
Prime	Pts: Brandin Podziemski 23; Rebs: Brandin Podziemski 10; Asts: Draymond Green 6	Recap	Pts: Jalen Green 36; Rebs: Jordan Goodwin 9 Asts: Devin Booker 8	Attendance: 17,071; Referees: Aaron Smith, Scott Foster, Mitchell Ervin, Tre Maddox

== Frequent matchups ==
(*) – Number of overtime periods played in the specific game.

=== Eastern Conference ===
Count	Matchup	Record	Years
3	Chicago Bulls vs. Miami Heat	Heat, 3–0	2023, 2024, 2025
2	Atlanta Hawks vs. Miami Heat	Tied, 1–1	2023, 2025*

=== Western Conference ===
Count	Matchup	Record	Years
2	Golden State Warriors vs. Memphis Grizzlies	Tied, 1–1	2021*, 2025

== All-time standings ==
In sortable table below, teams are ordered first by number of appearances, then by number of wins, winning percentage, and finally by year of first appearance. In the "Season(s)" column, bold years indicate seasons qualifying for the NBA playoffs through the play-in tournament.

Team	Appearances	Games played	Wins	Losses	Win–loss %	Season(s)
Miami Heat	4	7	4	3	.571	2023, 2024, 2025, 2026
Atlanta Hawks	4	6	3	3	.500	2022, 2023, 2024, 2025
Golden State Warriors	4	6	2	4	.333	2021, 2024, 2025, 2026
Los Angeles Lakers	3	3	3	0	1.000	2021, 2023, 2024
Memphis Grizzlies	3	5	3	2	.600	2020, 2021, 2025
New Orleans Pelicans	3	5	3	2	.600	2022, 2023, 2024
Chicago Bulls	3	5	2	3	.400	2023, 2024, 2025
Charlotte Hornets	3	4	1	3	.250	2021, 2022, 2026
Portland Trail Blazers	2	2	2	0	1.000	2020, 2026
Philadelphia 76ers	2	2	2	0	1.000	2024, 2026
Minnesota Timberwolves	2	3	2	1	.667	2022, 2023
Orlando Magic	2	3	2	1	.667	2025, 2026
Sacramento Kings	2	3	1	2	.333	2024, 2025
San Antonio Spurs	2	2	0	2	.000	2021, 2022
Los Angeles Clippers	2	3	0	3	.000	2022, 2026
Boston Celtics	1	1	1	0	1.000	2021
Brooklyn Nets	1	1	1	0	1.000	2022
Indiana Pacers	1	2	1	1	.500	2021
Washington Wizards	1	2	1	1	.500	2021
Oklahoma City Thunder	1	2	1	1	.500	2023
Dallas Mavericks	1	2	1	1	.500	2025
Phoenix Suns	1	2	1	1	.500	2026
Cleveland Cavaliers	1	2	0	2	.000	2022
Toronto Raptors	1	1	0	1	.000	2023
Denver Nuggets	0	0	0	0	–	
Detroit Pistons	0	0	0	0	–	
Houston Rockets	0	0	0	0	–	
Milwaukee Bucks	0	0	0	0	–	
New York Knicks	0	0	0	0	–	
Utah Jazz	0	0	0	0	–	

== Media coverage ==
In 2020, ABC aired the only play-in game.

From 2021 to 2025, the tournament rights were split between TNT and ESPN. In 2021 and 2024, televised games were determined by which conference finals each network was airing. In 2022, 2023 and 2025, TNT aired both 7–8 games, and ESPN aired both 9–10 games, but the rights for the final seed game was still determined by which conference finals each network was airing.

As part of the new 11-year media deals that began in the 2025–26 season, Amazon Prime Video will broadcast all NBA play-in tournament games beginning in 2026.

In Canada, the home market of the Toronto Raptors, coverage is split approximately equally between the Sportsnet and TSN. Under their rights, the two broadcasters are allowed to produce their own feeds of Raptors games, otherwise they generally simulcast the U.S. broadcaster's feed.
