= 2022–23 Atlanta Hawks season =

- Head coach: Nate McMillan (fired); Joe Prunty (interim); Quin Snyder
- President: Travis Schlenk
- General manager: Landry Fields
- Owner: Tony Ressler
- Arena: State Farm Arena

Results
- Record: 41–41 (.500)
- Place: Division: 2nd (Southeast); Conference: 8th (Eastern)
- Playoff finish: First round (lost to Celtics 2–4)
- Stats at Basketball Reference

Local media
- Television: Bally Sports South; Bally Sports Southeast
- Radio: 92.9 FM "The Game"

The 2022–23 Atlanta Hawks season was the 74th season of the franchise in the National Basketball Association (NBA) and 55th in Atlanta. On February 21, 2023, the Hawks fired Nate McMillan, who spent three seasons with the team. Joe Prunty was named the interim head coach until Quin Snyder was hired.

The team clinched the seventh seed in the 2023 NBA playoffs on April 11, 2023, in the NBA play-in tournament, following a win over the Miami Heat, who finished 7th in the regular season. However, they lost in the First Round to the Boston Celtics in six games. This season marked the last time the Hawks made the playoffs until 2026.

== Draft ==
Round	Pick	Player	Position	Nationality	School/Club team
1	16	AJ Griffin	Small forward	United States	Duke
2	44	Ryan Rollins	Shooting guard	United States	Toledo

The Hawks entered the draft holding one first round pick and one second round pick. On draft night they traded the 44th pick (Ryan Rollins) to the Golden State Warriors in exchange for the 51st pick (Tyrese Martin) and cash considerations ($2,000,000).

== Roster ==
2022–23 Atlanta Hawks roster
Players

Pos.	No.	Player	Height	Weight	DOB	From
F	41	Saddiq Bey	6 ft 7 in (2.01 m)	215 lb (98 kg)	1999-04-09	Villanova
G	13	Bogdan Bogdanović	6 ft 5 in (1.96 m)	225 lb (102 kg)	1992-08-18	Serbia
C	15	Clint Capela	6 ft 10 in (2.08 m)	256 lb (116 kg)	1994-05-18	Switzerland
F	20	John Collins	6 ft 9 in (2.06 m)	226 lb (103 kg)	1997-09-23	Wake Forest
F/C	24	Bruno Fernando	6 ft 10 in (2.08 m)	240 lb (109 kg)	1998-08-15	Maryland
G	2	Trent Forrest (TW)	6 ft 4 in (1.93 m)	210 lb (95 kg)	1998-06-12	Florida State
F	14	AJ Griffin	6 ft 6 in (1.98 m)	222 lb (101 kg)	2003-08-25	Duke
G	3	Aaron Holiday	6 ft 0 in (1.83 m)	185 lb (84 kg)	1996-09-30	UCLA
G/F	12	De'Andre Hunter	6 ft 8 in (2.03 m)	221 lb (100 kg)	1997-12-02	Virginia
F	1	Jalen Johnson	6 ft 8 in (2.03 m)	219 lb (99 kg)	2001-12-18	Duke
G	27	Vít Krejčí	6 ft 8 in (2.03 m)	195 lb (88 kg)	2000-06-19	Czech Republic
G	25	Garrison Mathews	6 ft 6 in (1.98 m)	215 lb (98 kg)	1996-10-24	Lipscomb
G/F	22	Tyrese Martin	6 ft 6 in (1.98 m)	215 lb (98 kg)	1999-03-07	Connecticut
G	5	Dejounte Murray	6 ft 5 in (1.96 m)	180 lb (82 kg)	1996-09-19	Washington
F/C	17	Onyeka Okongwu	6 ft 10 in (2.08 m)	240 lb (109 kg)	2000-12-11	USC
G	4	Donovan Williams (TW)	6 ft 6 in (1.98 m)	190 lb (86 kg)	2001-09-06	UNLV
G	11	Trae Young	6 ft 1 in (1.85 m)	164 lb (74 kg)	1998-09-19	Oklahoma

Coaches
Head coach
- Quin Snyder
Assistant(s)
- Matt Hill
- Mike Longabardi
- Jamelle McMillan
- Dipesh Mistry
- Joe Prunty
- Nick Van Exel

Legend
- (DP) Unsigned draft pick
- (FA) Free agent
- (S) Suspended
- (GL) On assignment to G League affiliate
- (TW) Two-way affiliate player
- Injured

Roster
Updated: February 26, 2023

== Standings ==
=== Division ===
Southeast Division	W	L	PCT	GB	Home	Road	Div	GP
y – Miami Heat	44	38	.537	–	27‍–‍14	17‍–‍24	10–6	82
x – Atlanta Hawks	41	41	.500	3.0	24‍–‍17	17‍–‍24	8–8	82
Washington Wizards	35	47	.427	9.0	19‍–‍22	16‍–‍25	8–8	82
Orlando Magic	34	48	.415	10.0	20‍–‍21	14‍–‍27	7–9	82
Charlotte Hornets	27	55	.329	17.0	13‍–‍28	14‍–‍27	7–9	82

=== Conference ===
Eastern Conference
#	Team	W	L	PCT	GB	GP
1	z – Milwaukee Bucks *	58	24	.707	–	82
2	y – Boston Celtics *	57	25	.695	1.0	82
3	x – Philadelphia 76ers	54	28	.659	4.0	82
4	x – Cleveland Cavaliers	51	31	.622	7.0	82
5	x – New York Knicks	47	35	.573	11.0	82
6	x – Brooklyn Nets	45	37	.549	13.0	82
7	y – Miami Heat *	44	38	.537	14.0	82
8	x – Atlanta Hawks	41	41	.500	17.0	82
9	pi – Toronto Raptors	41	41	.500	17.0	82
10	pi – Chicago Bulls	40	42	.488	18.0	82
11	Indiana Pacers	35	47	.427	23.0	82
12	Washington Wizards	35	47	.427	23.0	82
13	Orlando Magic	34	48	.415	24.0	82
14	Charlotte Hornets	27	55	.329	31.0	82
15	Detroit Pistons	17	65	.207	41.0	82

== Game log ==
=== Preseason ===
2022 preseason game log
Total: 2–2 (home: 1–0; road: 1–2)
Preseason: 2–2 (home: 1–0; road: 1–2)

Game	Date	Team	Score	High points	High rebounds	High assists	Location Attendance	Record
1	October 6	Milwaukee	W 123–113	Dejounte Murray (25)	Dejounte Murray (8)	Dejounte Murray (9)	Etihad Arena; 11,449	1–0
2	October 8	@ Milwaukee	W 118–109	Trae Young (31)	Clint Capela (8)	Trae Young (6)	Etihad Arena; 11,563	2–0
3	October 12	@ Cleveland	L 99–105	Dejounte Murray (17)	Clint Capela (15)	Trae Young (6)	Rocket Mortgage FieldHouse; 13,072	2–1
4	October 14	@ New Orleans	L 111–120	Dejounte Murray (18)	Jalen Johnson (9)	Trae Young (7)	Legacy Arena; 12,787	2–2

2022–23 preseason schedule

=== Regular season ===
2022–23 game log
Total: 41–41 (home: 24–17; road: 17–24)
October: 4–3 (home: 2–1; road: 2–2)

Game	Date	Team	Score	High points	High rebounds	High assists	Location Attendance	Record
1	October 19	Houston	W 117–107	John Collins (21)	Onyeka Okongwu (9)	Trae Young (13)	State Farm Arena; 17,878	1–0
2	October 21	Orlando	W 108–98	Trae Young (25)	John Collins (13)	Trae Young (13)	State Farm Arena; 17,822	2–0
3	October 23	Charlotte	L 109–126	Trae Young (28)	Capela, Collins (10)	Trae Young (9)	State Farm Arena; 17,383	2–1
4	October 26	@ Detroit	W 118–113	Trae Young (35)	John Collins (11)	Dejounte Murray (8)	Little Caesars Arena; 17,987	3–1
5	October 28	@ Detroit	W 136–112	Trae Young (36)	Clint Capela (11)	Trae Young (12)	Little Caesars Arena; 18,923	4–1
6	October 29	@ Milwaukee	L 115–123	Trae Young (42)	Clint Capela (10)	Dejounte Murray (6)	Fiserv Forum; 17,341	4–2
7	October 31	@ Toronto	L 109–139	Dejounte Murray (20)	John Collins (12)	Trae Young (10)	Scotiabank Arena; 19,800	4–3

November : 8–7 (home: 5–3; road: 3–4)

Game	Date	Team	Score	High points	High rebounds	High assists	Location Attendance	Record
8	November 2	@ New York	W 112–99	Dejounte Murray (36)	John Collins (13)	Dejounte Murray (9)	Madison Square Garden; 19,812	5–3
9	November 5	New Orleans	W 124–121 (OT)	Trae Young (34)	Clint Capela (19)	Dejounte Murray (11)	State Farm Arena; 17,654	6–3
10	November 7	Milwaukee	W 117–98	Dejounte Murray (25)	Clint Capela (12)	Dejounte Murray (11)	State Farm Arena; 17,494	7–3
11	November 9	Utah	L 119–125	Dejounte Murray (26)	Clint Capela (19)	Trae Young (9)	State Farm Arena; 15,845	7–4
12	November 10	Philadelphia	W 104–95	Trae Young (26)	Clint Capela (20)	Dejounte Murray (8)	State Farm Arena; 16,066	8–4
13	November 12	@ Philadelphia	L 109–121	Trae Young (27)	Clint Capela (15)	Trae Young (11)	Wells Fargo Center; 20,245	8–5
14	November 14	@ Milwaukee	W 121–106	De'Andre Hunter (24)	Clint Capela (10)	Trae Young (9)	Fiserv Forum; 17,341	9–5
15	November 16	Boston	L 101–126	Trae Young (27)	Onyeka Okongwu (9)	Trae Young (9)	State Farm Arena; 18,165	9–6
16	November 19	Toronto	W 124–122 (OT)	Trae Young (33)	Clint Capela (14)	Trae Young (12)	State Farm Arena; 18,051	10–6
17	November 21	@ Cleveland	L 102–114	Trae Young (25)	Clint Capela (12)	Trae Young (10)	Rocket Mortgage FieldHouse; 19,432	10–7
18	November 23	Sacramento	W 115–106	Trae Young (35)	Clint Capela (14)	Trae Young (7)	State Farm Arena; 18,173	11–7
19	November 25	@ Houston	L 122–128	Trae Young (44)	Onyeka Okongwu (11)	Trae Young (5)	Toyota Center; 16,669	11–8
20	November 27	Miami	L 98–106	John Collins (23)	John Collins (14)	Trae Young (14)	State Farm Arena; 17,268	11–9
21	November 28	@ Philadelphia	L 101–104	Hunter, Young (18)	Clint Capela (16)	Trae Young (10)	Wells Fargo Center; 19,778	11–10
22	November 30	@ Orlando	W 125–108	Trae Young (30)	Capela, Culver (12)	Trae Young (14)	Amway Center; 15,344	12–10

December: 5–9 (home: 4–4; road: 1–5)

Game	Date	Team	Score	High points	High rebounds	High assists	Location Attendance	Record
23	December 2	Denver	W 117–109	Dejounte Murray (34)	Clint Capela (11)	Dejounte Murray (8)	State Farm Arena; 16,974	13–10
24	December 5	Oklahoma City	L 114–121	Dejounte Murray (24)	Clint Capela (16)	Trae Young (10)	State Farm Arena; 16,301	13–11
25	December 7	@ New York	L 89–113	Trae Young (19)	Clint Capela (11)	Trae Young (6)	Madison Square Garden; 18,091	13–12
26	December 9	@ Brooklyn	L 116–120	Trae Young (33)	Clint Capela (11)	Trae Young (9)	Barclays Center; 18,072	13–13
27	December 11	Chicago	W 123–122 (OT)	Bogdan Bogdanović (28)	Clint Capela (14)	Trae Young (14)	State Farm Arena; 17,227	14–13
28	December 12	@ Memphis	L 103–128	De'Andre Hunter (19)	Onyeka Okongwu (10)	Aaron Holiday (6)	FedExForum; 16,544	14–14
29	December 14	@ Orlando	L 124–135	De'Andre Hunter (25)	Onyeka Okongwu (11)	Trae Young (16)	Amway Center; 16,002	14–15
30	December 16	@ Charlotte	W 125–106	Trae Young (31)	Bogdan Bogdanović (9)	Trae Young (9)	Spectrum Center; 17,772	15–15
31	December 19	Orlando	W 126–125	Trae Young (37)	Onyeka Okongwu (8)	Trae Young (13)	State Farm Arena; 17,809	16–15
32	December 21	Chicago	L 108–110	Trae Young (34)	Onyeka Okongwu (11)	Dejounte Murray (10)	State Farm Arena; 17,226	16–16
33	December 23	Detroit	W 130–105	Murray, Young (26)	John Collins (12)	Trae Young (13)	State Farm Arena; 17,028	17–16
34	December 27	@ Indiana	L 114–129	John Collins (26)	John Collins (10)	Trae Young (10)	Gainbridge Fieldhouse; 17,028	17–17
35	December 28	Brooklyn	L 107–108	Dejounte Murray (24)	Onyeka Okongwu (13)	Dejounte Murray (8)	State Farm Arena; 18,030	17–18
36	December 30	L.A. Lakers	L 121–130	Trae Young (29)	John Collins (9)	Dejounte Murray (9)	State Farm Arena; 17,984	17–19

January: 8–6 (home: 2–3; road: 6–3)

Game	Date	Team	Score	High points	High rebounds	High assists	Location Attendance	Record
37	January 2	@ Golden State	L 141–143 (2OT)	Trae Young (30)	John Collins (13)	Trae Young (14)	Chase Center; 18,064	17–20
38	January 4	@ Sacramento	W 120–117	Collins, Hunter (22)	John Collins (12)	Trae Young (6)	Golden 1 Center; 17,611	18–20
39	January 6	@ L.A. Lakers	L 114–130	Trae Young (32)	Collins, Hunter (8)	Trae Young (9)	Crypto.com Arena; 18,997	18–21
40	January 8	@ L.A. Clippers	W 112–108	Trae Young (30)	Collins, Okongwu (9)	Trae Young (8)	Crypto.com Arena; 19,068	19–21
41	January 11	Milwaukee	L 105–114	Bogdan Bogdanović (22)	Hunter, Okongwu (9)	Bogdanović, Murray, Okongwu (5)	State Farm Arena; 17,154	19–22
42	January 13	@ Indiana	W 113–111	Trae Young (26)	Onyeka Okongwu (20)	Trae Young (11)	Gainbridge Fieldhouse; 16,071	20–22
43	January 14	@ Toronto	W 114–103	Trae Young (29)	Onyeka Okongwu (13)	Trae Young (9)	Scotiabank Arena; 19,800	21–22
44	January 16	Miami	W 121–113	Dejounte Murray (28)	Clint Capela (6)	Trae Young (8)	State Farm Arena; 18,007	22–22
45	January 18	@ Dallas	W 130–122	Dejounte Murray (30)	Dejounte Murray (7)	Trae Young (12)	American Airlines Center; 20,125	23–22
46	January 20	New York	W 139–124	Dejounte Murray (29)	Capela, Collins (9)	Dejounte Murray (12)	State Farm Arena; 17,711	24–22
47	January 21	@ Charlotte	L 118–122	Dejounte Murray (26)	Clint Capela (9)	Trae Young (12)	State Farm Arena; 17,928	24–23
48	January 23	@ Chicago	L 100–111	Trae Young (21)	Clint Capela (12)	Trae Young (12)	United Center; 20,938	24–24
49	January 25	@ Oklahoma City	W 137–132	Trae Young (33)	Capela, Collins (10)	Trae Young (11)	Paycom Center; 15,079	25–24
50	January 28	L.A. Clippers	L 113–120	Trae Young (31)	Clint Capela (13)	Trae Young (10)	State Farm Arena; 18,448	25–25
51	January 30	@ Portland	W 125–119	Dejounte Murray (40)	Clint Capela (15)	Bogdanović, Murray (7)	Paycom Center; 15,079	25–26

February : 6–5 (home: 4–1; road: 2–4)

Game	Date	Team	Score	High points	High rebounds	High assists	Location Attendance	Record
52	February 1	@ Phoenix	W 132–100	Dejounte Murray (21)	Jalen Johnson (11)	Trae Young (12)	Footprint Center; 17,071	26–26
53	February 3	@ Utah	W 115–108	Trae Young (27)	Clint Capela (13)	Dejounte Murray (8)	Vivint Arena; 18,206	27–26
54	February 4	@ Denver	L 108–128	Dejounte Murray (28)	Clint Capela (11)	Dejounte Murray (10)	Ball Arena; 19,630	27–27
55	February 7	@ New Orleans	L 107–116	Bogdan Bogdanović (22)	Clint Capela (8)	Trae Young (16)	Smoothie King Center; 16,669	27–28
56	February 9	Phoenix	W 116–107	Trae Young (36)	Clint Capela (17)	Trae Young (12)	State Farm Arena; 17,003	28–28
57	February 11	San Antonio	W 125–106	Hunter, Young (24)	Clint Capela (12)	Trae Young (17)	State Farm Arena; 17,875	29–28
58	February 13	@ Charlotte	L 138–144	Trae Young (25)	Capela, Hunter, Okongwu (7)	Trae Young (14)	Spectrum Center; 14,078	29–29
59	February 15	New York	L 101–122	De'Andre Hunter (20)	Clint Capela (8)	Trae Young (11)	State Farm Arena; 17,771	29–30
60	February 24	Cleveland	W 136–119	Trae Young (34)	Onyeka Okongwu (11)	Trae Young (9)	State Farm Arena; 18,065	30–30
61	February 26	Brooklyn	W 129–127	Trae Young (34)	Clint Capela (12)	Trae Young (8)	State Farm Arena; 16,983	31–30
62	February 28	Washington	L 116–119	Trae Young (31)	Clint Capela (15)	Trae Young (7)	State Farm Arena; 17,395	31–31

March : 7–8 (home: 5–3; road: 2–5)

Game	Date	Team	Score	High points	High rebounds	High assists	Location Attendance	Record
63	March 3	Portland	W 129–111	Dejounte Murray (41)	Clint Capela (12)	Trae Young (11)	State Farm Arena; 17,521	32–31
64	March 4	@ Miami	L 109–117	Saddiq Bey (22)	Clint Capela (13)	Trae Young (10)	Miami-Dade Arena; 19,600	32–32
65	March 6	@ Miami	L 128–130	Trae Young (25)	Clint Capela (10)	Dejounte Murray (8)	Miami-Dade Arena; 19,600	32–33
66	March 8	@ Washington	W 122–120	Trae Young (28)	Bogdan Bogdanović (8)	Trae Young (10)	Capital One Arena; 15,087	33–33
67	March 10	@ Washington	W 114–107	Trae Young (28)	Clint Capela (10)	Trae Young (9)	Capital One Arena; 18,161	34–33
68	March 11	Boston	L 125–134	Trae Young (35)	Capela, Collins (9)	Trae Young (13)	State Farm Arena; 17,884	34–34
69	March 13	Minnesota	L 115–136	Trae Young (41)	Onyeka Okongwu (14)	Trae Young (7)	State Farm Arena; 17,799	34–35
70	March 17	Golden State	W 127–119	Trae Young (25)	Clint Capela (9)	Trae Young (12)	State Farm Arena; 18,201	35–35
71	March 19	@ San Antonio	L 118–126	Dejounte Murray (22)	Clint Capela (12)	Dejounte Murray (8)	AT&T Center; 16,311	35–36
72	March 21	Detroit	W 129–107	Trae Young (30)	Clint Capela (16)	Trae Young (12)	State Farm Arena; 17,129	36–36
73	March 22	@ Minnesota	L 124–125	Trae Young (29)	Clint Capela (8)	Trae Young (8)	Target Center; 17,136	36–37
74	March 25	Indiana	W 143–130	John Collins (21)	Clint Capela (17)	Dejounte Murray (12)	State Farm Arena; 17,699	37–37
75	March 26	Memphis	L 119–123	Trae Young (28)	Clint Capela (16)	Trae Young (10)	State Farm Arena; 18,056	37–38
76	March 28	Cleveland	W 120–118	Dejounte Murray (29)	Bey, Capela (10)	Trae Young (10)	State Farm Arena; 17,748	38–38
77	March 31	@ Brooklyn	L 107–124	Dejounte Murray (21)	Jalen Johnson (8)	Trae Young (6)	Barclays Center; 17,849	38–39

April : 3–2 (home: 2–1; road: 1–1)

Game	Date	Team	Score	High points	High rebounds	High assists	Location Attendance	Record
78	April 2	Dallas	W 132–130 (OT)	Dejounte Murray (25)	Clint Capela (11)	Trae Young (12)	State Farm Arena; 17,678	39–39
79	April 4	@ Chicago	W 123–105	Bogdan Bogdanović (26)	Clint Capela (14)	Dejounte Murray (9)	United Center; 21,717	40–39
80	April 5	Washington	W 134–116	Trae Young (25)	Capela, Johnson (8)	Trae Young (16)	State Farm Arena; 17,727	41–39
81	April 7	Philadelphia	L 131–136	Trae Young (27)	Collins, Okongwu (8)	Trae Young (20)	State Farm Arena; 17,627	41–40
82	April 9	@ Boston	L 114–120	Fernando, Mathews (19)	Bruno Fernando (10)	Aaron Holiday (6)	TD Garden; 19,156	41–41

2022–23 season schedule

=== Play-in ===
2023 play-in game log
Total: 1–0 (home: 0–0; road: 1–0)
Play-in: 1–0 (home: 0–0; road: 1–0)

Game	Date	Team	Score	High points	High rebounds	High assists	Location Attendance	Record
1	April 11	@ Miami	W 116–105	Trae Young (25)	Clint Capela (21)	Trae Young (7)	Kaseya Center; 19,662	1–0

2022–23 season schedule

=== Playoffs ===
2023 playoff game log
Total: 2–4 (home: 1–2; road: 1–2)
First Round: 2–4 (home: 1–2; road: 1–2)

Game	Date	Team	Score	High points	High rebounds	High assists	Location Attendance	Series
1	April 15	@ Boston	L 99–112	Dejounte Murray (24)	Capela, Murray (8)	Trae Young (8)	TD Garden; 19,156	0–1
2	April 18	@ Boston	L 106–119	Dejounte Murray (29)	De'Andre Hunter (12)	Murray, Young (6)	TD Garden; 19,156	0–2
3	April 21	Boston	W 130–122	Trae Young (32)	Clint Capela (11)	Trae Young (9)	State Farm Arena; 18,536	1–2
4	April 23	Boston	L 121–129	Trae Young (35)	Dejounte Murray (9)	Trae Young (15)	State Farm Arena; 19,144	1–3
5	April 25	@ Boston	W 119–117	Trae Young (38)	Clint Capela (7)	Trae Young (13)	TD Garden; 19,156	2–3
6	April 27	Boston	L 120–128	Trae Young (30)	Onyeka Okongwu (11)	Dejounte Murray (11)	State Farm Arena; 19,176	2–4

2023 playoff schedule

== Player statistics ==
Legend
GP	Games played	GS	Games started	MPG	Minutes per game
FG%	Field-goal percentage	3P%	3-point field-goal percentage	FT%	Free-throw percentage
RPG	Rebounds per game	APG	Assists per game	SPG	Steals per game
BPG	Blocks per game	PPG	Points per game

=== Regular season ===
Player	GP	GS	MPG	FG%	3P%	FT%	RPG	APG	SPG	BPG	PPG
Onyeka Okongwu	80	18	23.1	.638	.308	.781	7.2	1.0	.7	1.3	9.9
Dejounte Murray	74	74	36.4	.464	.344	.832	5.3	6.1	1.5	.3	20.5
Trae Young	73	73	34.8	.429	.335	.886	3.0	10.2	1.1	.1	26.2
AJ Griffin	72	12	19.5	.465	.390	.894	2.1	1.0	.6	.2	8.9
John Collins	71	71	30.0	.508	.292	.803	6.5	1.2	.6	1.0	13.1
Jalen Johnson	70	6	14.9	.491	.288	.628	4.0	1.2	.5	.5	5.6
De'Andre Hunter	67	67	31.7	.461	.350	.826	4.2	1.4	.5	.3	15.4
Clint Capela	65	63	26.6	.653	.000	.603	11.0	.9	.7	1.2	12.0
Aaron Holiday	63	6	13.4	.418	.409	.844	1.2	1.4	.6	.2	3.9
Bogdan Bogdanović	54	9	27.9	.447	.406	.831	3.1	2.8	.8	.3	14.0
Vít Krejčí	29	0	5.7	.405	.238	.500	.9	.6	.2	.0	1.2
Justin Holiday^{†}	28	0	14.7	.384	.345		.8	.9	.2	.4	4.5
Frank Kaminsky^{†}	26	0	6.8	.568	.478	.833	1.4	.8	.2	.0	2.7
Saddiq Bey^{†}	25	7	25.2	.470	.400	.862	4.8	1.4	.8	.0	11.6
Trent Forrest	23	3	12.0	.417	.000	.667	1.6	1.7	.3	.1	2.3
Tyrese Martin	16	0	4.1	.391	.143	1.000	.8	.1	.1	.0	1.3
Jarrett Culver	10	1	13.7	.395	.083	.692	3.8	.6	.6	.2	4.4
Garrison Mathews^{†}	9	0	9.3	.419	.400	.875	1.2	.3	.1	.1	4.8
Bruno Fernando^{†}	8	0	5.1	.579	.000	.833	1.9	.1	.0	.4	3.4
Donovan Williams	2	0	2.0	.400	.000		1.0	.0	.0	.0	2.0

=== Playoffs ===
Player	GP	GS	MPG	FG%	3P%	FT%	RPG	APG	SPG	BPG	PPG
Trae Young	6	6	38.3	.403	.333	.860	3.7	10.2	1.7	.7	29.2
De'Andre Hunter	6	6	37.3	.459	.368	.800	5.7	1.2	.7	.3	16.7
John Collins	6	6	27.3	.433	.344	.833	4.3	.8	.3	1.0	11.3
Clint Capela	6	6	25.2	.605		.667	8.3	.5	1.0	.5	8.3
Bogdan Bogdanović	6	1	26.2	.556	.455	.714	3.0	2.5	1.0	.8	13.3
Saddiq Bey	6	0	22.2	.375	.389	.889	4.0	1.0	.5	.0	7.5
Onyeka Okongwu	6	0	21.8	.600	1.000	.500	6.3	1.2	.3	1.3	6.0
Jalen Johnson	6	0	9.3	.417	.364	1.000	2.5	1.3	.5	.0	4.3
Dejounte Murray	5	5	38.0	.447	.378	1.000	7.2	6.8	2.0	.2	23.0
Aaron Holiday	1	0	4.0				.0	1.0	.0	.0	.0

- ^{†} Denotes player spent time with another team in the season. Stats reflect time with the Hawks only.

== Transactions ==
=== Trades ===
June 23, 2022	To Atlanta Hawks Draft rights to Tyrese Martin (No. 51); Cash considerations	To Golden State Warriors Draft rights to Ryan Rollins (No. 44)
June 30, 2022	To Atlanta Hawks Dejounte Murray; Jock Landale	To San Antonio Spurs Danilo Gallinari; 2023 CHA protected first-round pick 2025 ATL first-round pick 2026 right to swap first-round picks 2027 ATL first-round pick
July 6, 2022	To Atlanta Hawks Cash considerations	To Phoenix Suns Jock Landale
July 6, 2022	To Atlanta Hawks Maurice Harkless; Justin Holiday; 2024 SAC protected first-round pick	To Sacramento Kings Kevin Huerter
February 9, 2023	Four-team trade
February 9, 2023	To Atlanta Hawks Saddiq Bey	To Golden State Warriors Gary Payton II; 2 future ATL second-round picks
February 9, 2023	To Detroit Pistons James Wiseman	To Portland Trail Blazers Kevin Knox II; 5 future second-round picks

=== Free agents ===
==== Additions ====
Player	Signed	Former team
Aaron Holiday	July 6, 2022	Phoenix Suns
Frank Kaminsky	July 12, 2022	Phoenix Suns

==== Subtractions ====
Player	Date	New team
Delon Wright	July 6, 2022	Washington Wizards
