= Quin Snyder =

American basketball coach (born 1966)

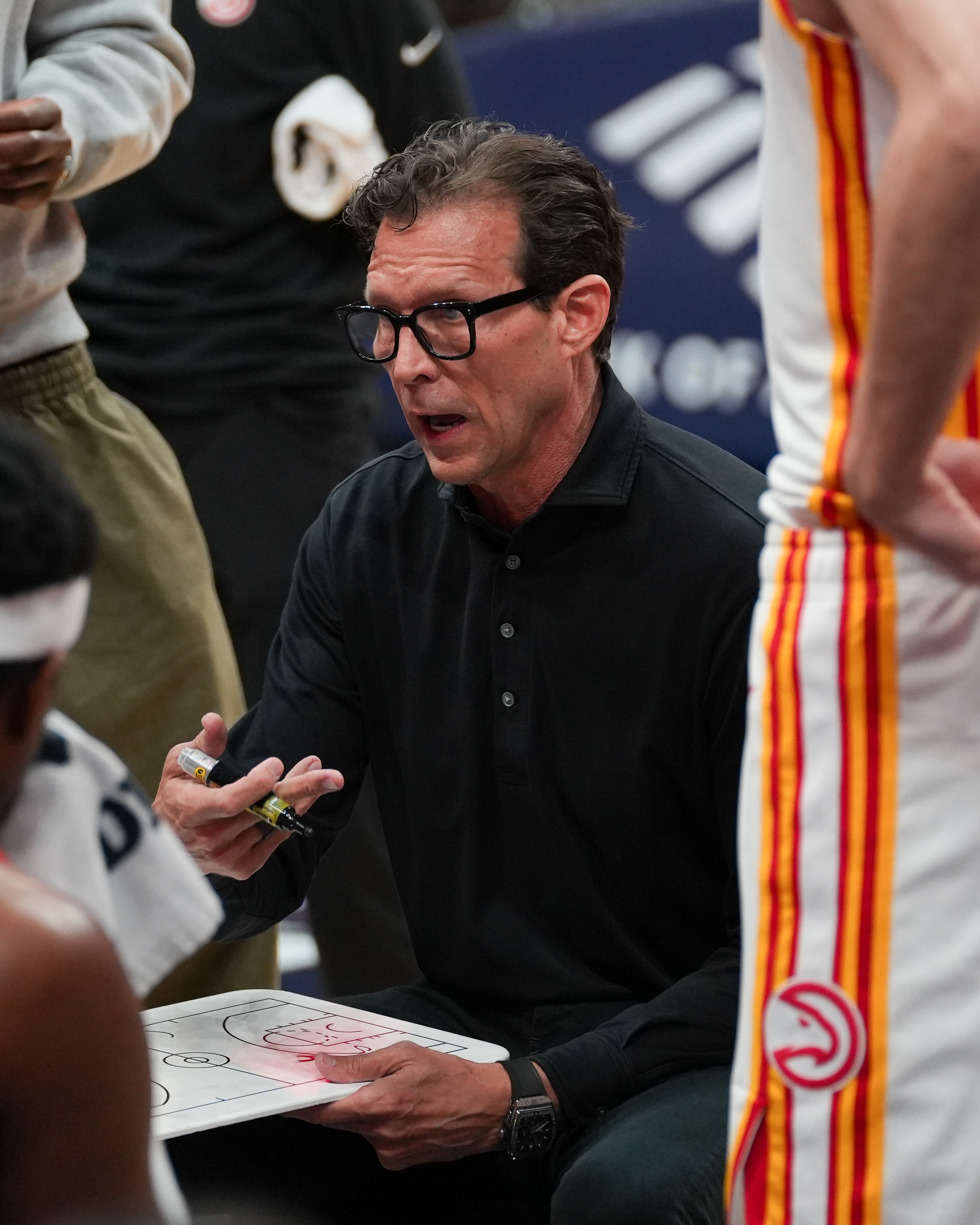
- Snyder coaching the Atlanta Hawks

Atlanta Hawks
- Position: Head coach
- League: NBA

Personal information
- Born: October 30, 1966 (age 60) Mercer Island, Washington, U.S.
- Listed height: 6 ft 3 in (1.91 m)
- Listed weight: 180 lb (82 kg)

Career information
- High school: Mercer Island (Mercer Island, Washington)
- College: Duke (1985–1989)
- NBA draft: 1989: undrafted
- Coaching career: 1992–present

Career highlights
- As player: McDonald's All-American (1985); As head coach: NBA All-Star Game head coach (2021); NBA D-League Coach of the Year (2009)

Quin Price Snyder (born October 30, 1966) is an American professional basketball coach who is the head coach for the Atlanta Hawks of the National Basketball Association (NBA). After being named a McDonald's All American as a high school player in Washington, he played college basketball for the Duke Blue Devils. He previously served as the head coach of the Utah Jazz for eight seasons.

== Early life ==
Snyder was born in Mercer Island, Washington, and graduated from Mercer Island High School in 1985. A two-time state basketball player of the year, Snyder led the team to the 1985 state championship. During this time Mercer Island achieved a No. 1 ranking in USA Today's high school polls. Snyder was named a McDonald's All American, the first player chosen from Washington.

== College career ==
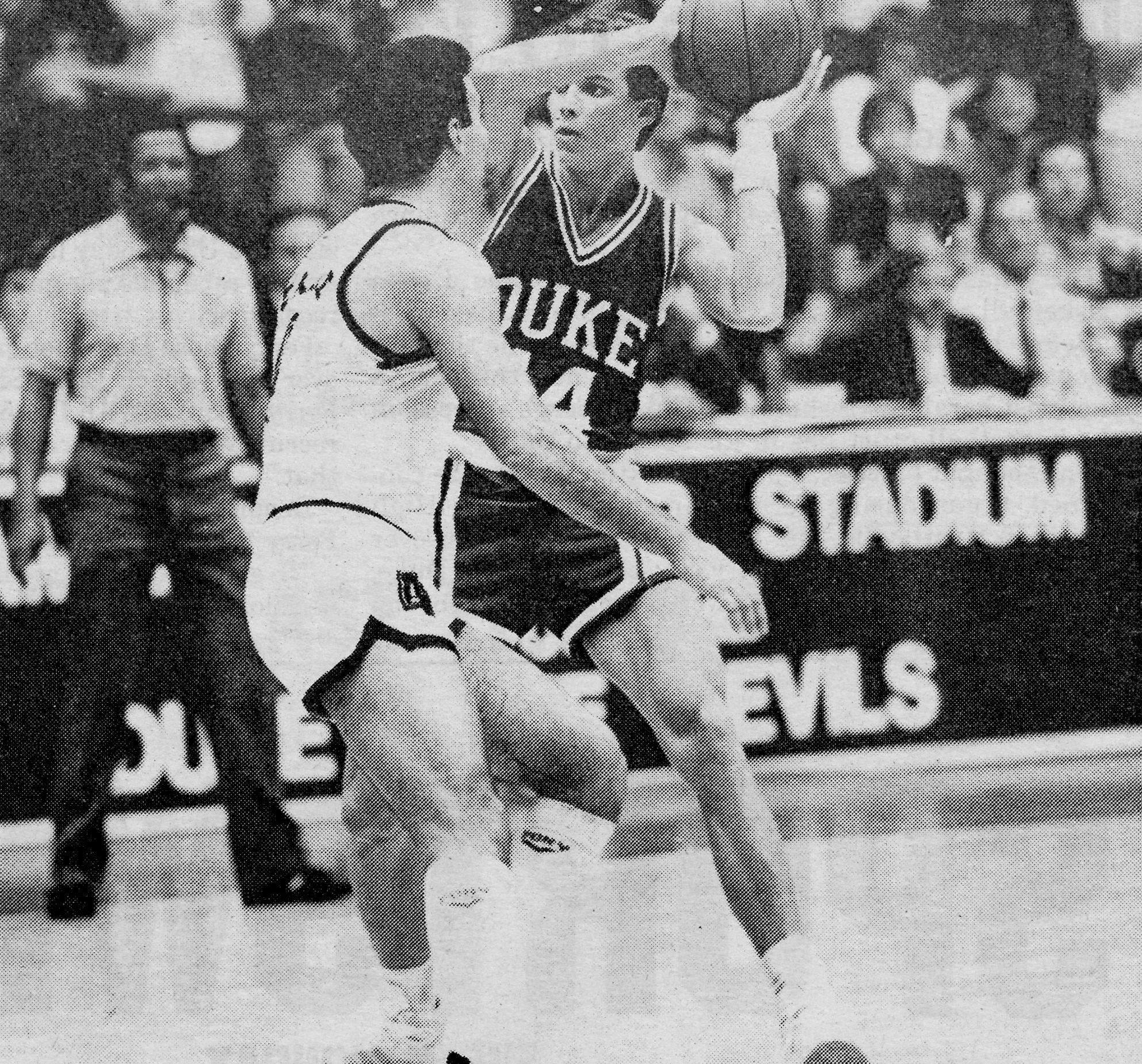
Snyder as a freshman at Duke

At Duke University, Snyder was a point guard for the Blue Devils from 1985 to 1989, and his team played in the Final Four in 1986, 1988, and 1989. He became a starter in his second season (1987) and started almost all games the remainder of his career. He was elected a team captain and honored as an Academic All-American during his senior season.

He graduated from Duke in 1989 with a double major in philosophy and political science, and, later received a J.D. degree from Duke Law School in 1995 and an M.B.A. degree from the Duke Fuqua School of Business in 1995.

== Coaching career ==
=== Los Angeles Clippers (1992–1993) ===
In the middle of his graduate work, Snyder spent the 1992–93 NBA season as an assistant coach for the Los Angeles Clippers.

=== Duke (1993–1999) ===
From 1993 to 1995, Snyder served as an administrative assistant to men's basketball coach Mike Krzyzewski while Snyder completed his MBA and JD at Duke. After completing both degrees in 1995, Snyder became a full-time assistant coach under Krzyzewski. In 1997, Duke promoted Snyder to associate head coach. During Snyder's time as a Duke assistant coach, Duke made the 1994 and 1999 NCAA tournament championship rounds and the Elite Eight round in 1998. Duke also won the ACC tournament in 1999.

=== Missouri (1999–2006) ===
In 1999, Snyder accepted the head coaching position for the University of Missouri Tigers men's basketball team, succeeding longtime coach Norm Stewart. He eventually led the Tigers to four consecutive NCAA tournament berths, including the Elite Eight in 2002, matching the deepest run ever made by a Missouri team in the NCAA Tournament.

His first team knocked off a ranked Illinois team and then defeated Kansas in Snyder's first game against Mizzou's archrival. Snyder's second season was punctuated by similar success. He once again toppled a ranked Kansas team and led the Tigers to their first NCAA victory since 1995. The eventual 2001 NCAA National Champion Duke ended the Tigers' season in the NCAA Tournament. He was named Rookie Coach of the Year by the Basketball Times after the season.

In the summer of 2003, Snyder was an assistant coach for United States at the Pan American Games. In May 2004, Snyder was named in 17 allegations as a part of an NCAA investigation over recruiting violations, centering on improper gifts to guard Ricky Clemons. The program was placed on a three-year probation that November after the NCAA infractions committee ruled that an assistant bought meals, provided transportation and illegally contacted recruits. The committee rejected claims by the school that the rule violations were inadvertent, although it also dismissed charges of major violations, including the Clemons' claim that assistant coaches paid players cash. Snyder later admitted to having players at his house for "an occasional meal" and giving Clemons clothing.

Snyder resigned as coach on February 10, 2006, following a 26-point loss to Baylor that extended a losing streak to six and dropped the Tigers to a 10–11 record overall, 3–7 in the Big 12. He finished with a 126–91 record over seven years, reaching the NCAA tournament in each of his first four seasons but posting only a 42–42 record since. After his resignation, Snyder accused Missouri athletic director Mike Alden of sending Gary Link, a basketball analyst and assistant to Alden, to inform him that he would be fired after the season.

=== Austin Toros (2007–2010) ===
Following his departure from Missouri in 2006, Snyder initially gave up on coaching for good. But in May 2007, he accepted the head coaching position of the Austin Toros in the NBADL

In the first season, Snyder's team won the Southwest Division championship and reached the D-League Finals. In his second season, Snyder led the Toros to a 32-win season; coached in the 2009 NBA D-League All-Star Game in Phoenix; received the Dennis Johnson Coach of the Year award; and reached the D-League Semi-Finals. In his final season with the team, the Toros compiled another 32-win season – this time with more rookies than any other team in the D-League – and again reached the Semi-Finals. During his three-year tenure in Austin, Snyder compiled more wins and guided more players to the NBA than any other coach in the D-League.

=== Philadelphia 76ers (2010–2011) ===
Snyder became a player development coach for the Philadelphia 76ers of the NBA on June 11, 2010, working under Doug Collins. Soon afterward, Snyder began training draft prospects in workouts preceding the 2010 NBA draft, including future 76ers player Evan Turner. The 76ers finished 41–41 in the 2010–11 season.

=== Los Angeles Lakers (2011–2012) ===
On July 1, 2011, NBA team Los Angeles Lakers hired Snyder as an assistant under coach Mike Brown. In a season shortened by a lockout, the Lakers finished the 2011–12 season in first place in the Pacific Division with a 41–25 record. The Lakers advanced to the Western Conference semi-finals.

=== CSKA Moscow (2012–2013) ===
On July 8, 2012, the Russian Professional Basketball League team CSKA Moscow hired Snyder as the head assistant coach under Ettore Messina. CSKA reached the Euroleague Final Four this season, but lost to eventual champion Olympiacos in the semi-final round.

=== Atlanta Hawks (2013–2014) ===
On June 10, 2013, the Atlanta Hawks hired Snyder as the head assistant coach.

=== Utah Jazz (2014–2022) ===
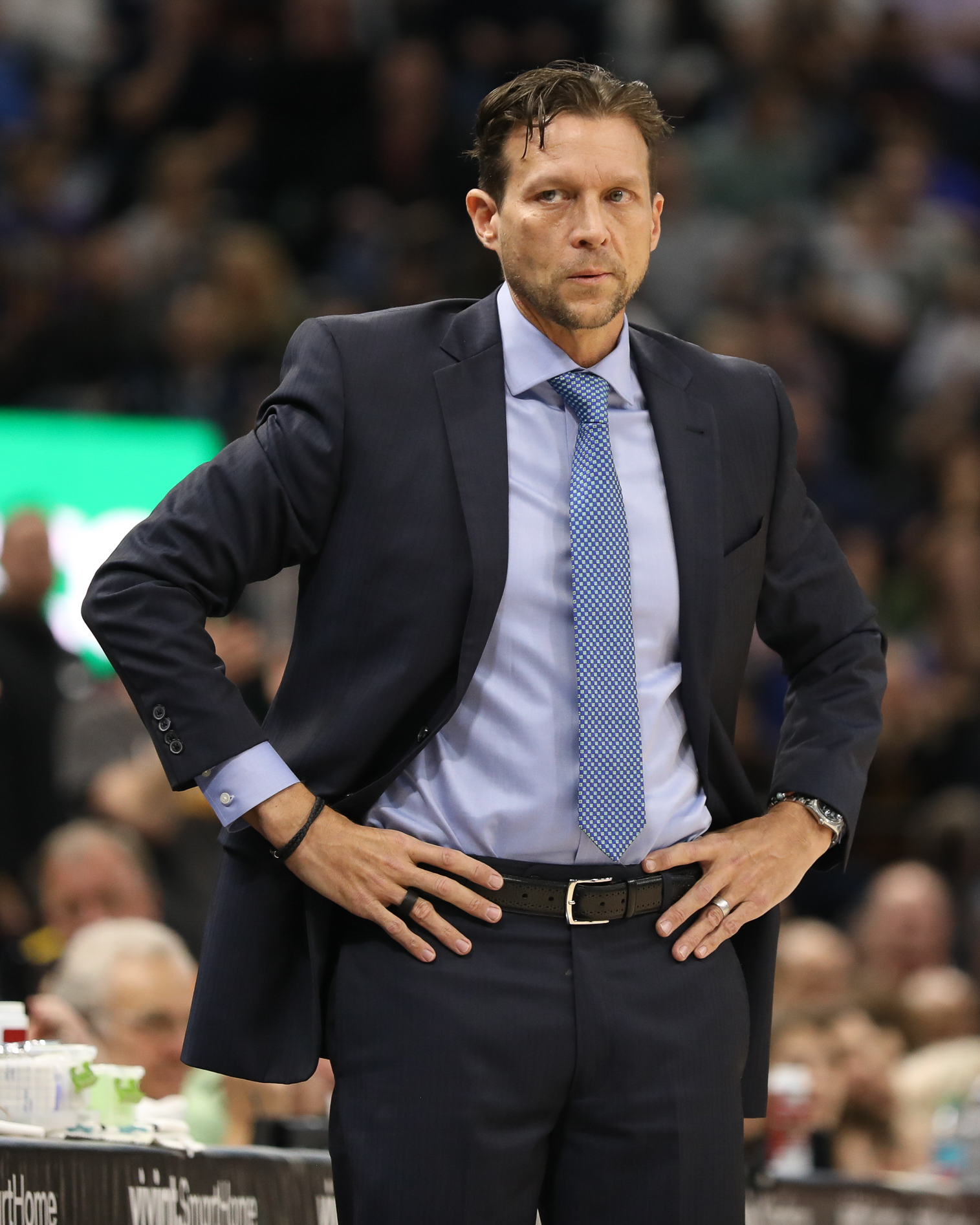
Coach Snyder coaching the Utah Jazz in 2017

On June 6, 2014, Snyder was hired by the Utah Jazz to be the team's head coach. He reportedly signed a three-year deal with a team option for a fourth season. Snyder previously worked with Jazz general manager Dennis Lindsey from 2007 to 2010 when Lindsey was an assistant general manager with the San Antonio Spurs and Snyder coached the Toros, the Spurs' D-League affiliate. On May 6, 2016, the Jazz announced a long-term contract extension for Snyder. In June 2018, Snyder was named a finalist for NBA Coach of the Year. On October 19, 2019, the Jazz signed Snyder to a new contract extension.

On February 18, 2021, Snyder was named as the Western Conference head coach for the 2021 NBA All-Star Game as a result of his team's NBA-best 23–5 record.

On June 5, 2022, Snyder resigned as head coach of the Jazz after eight seasons with a 372–264 (.585) regular season record.

=== Return to Atlanta (2023–present) ===
On February 26, 2023, the Atlanta Hawks hired Snyder as head coach.

On June 8, 2026, Snyder and the Hawks agreed to a multiyear contract extension.

== Head coaching record ==
=== College ===
Record table
Season	Team	Overall	Conference	Standing	Postseason
Missouri Tigers (Big 12 Conference) (1999–2006)
1999–00	Missouri	18–13	10–6	6th	NCAA Division I First Round
2000–01	Missouri	20–13	9–7	6th	NCAA Division I Second Round
2001–02	Missouri	24–12	9–7	6th	NCAA Division I Elite Eight
2002–03	Missouri	22–11	9–7	T–5th	NCAA Division I Second Round
2003–04	Missouri	16–14	9–7	T–5th	NIT First Round
2004–05	Missouri	16–17	7–9	T–8th	NIT First Round
2005–06	Missouri	10–11*	3–7*		
Missouri:		126–91	56–50		
Total:		126–91			

*Resigned before the season ended; Melvin Watkins became interim coach afterward, and Missouri finished the 2005–06 season 12–16 (5–11 Big 12) and 11th in the Big 12.

=== NBA ===
Legend
Regular season	G	Games coached	W	Games won	L	Games lost	W–L %	Win–loss %
Playoffs	PG	Playoff games	PW	Playoff wins	PL	Playoff losses	PW–L %	Playoff win–loss %

Team	Year	G	W	L	W–L%	Finish	PG	PW	PL	PW–L%	Result
Utah	2014–15	82	38	44	.463	3rd in Northwest	—	—	—	—	Missed playoffs
Utah	2015–16	82	40	42	.488	3rd in Northwest	—	—	—	—	Missed playoffs
Utah	2016–17	82	51	31	.622	1st in Northwest	11	4	7	.364	Lost in conference semifinals
Utah	2017–18	82	48	34	.585	3rd in Northwest	11	5	6	.455	Lost in conference semifinals
Utah	2018–19	82	50	32	.610	3rd in Northwest	5	1	4	.200	Lost in first round
Utah	2019–20	72	44	28	.611	3rd in Northwest	7	3	4	.429	Lost in first round
Utah	2020–21	72	52	20	.722	1st in Northwest	11	6	5	.545	Lost in conference semifinals
Utah	2021–22	82	49	33	.598	1st in Northwest	6	2	4	.333	Lost in first round
Atlanta	2022–23	21	10	11	.476	2nd in Southeast	6	2	4	.333	Lost in first round
Atlanta	2023–24	82	36	46	.439	3rd in Southeast	—	—	—	—	Missed playoffs
Atlanta	2024–25	82	40	42	.488	3rd in Southeast	—	—	—	—	Missed playoffs
Atlanta	2025–26	82	46	36	.561	1st in Southeast	6	2	4	.333	Lost in first round
Career		903	504	397	.559		63	25	38	.397	
