= Onyeka Okongwu =

American basketball player (born 2000)

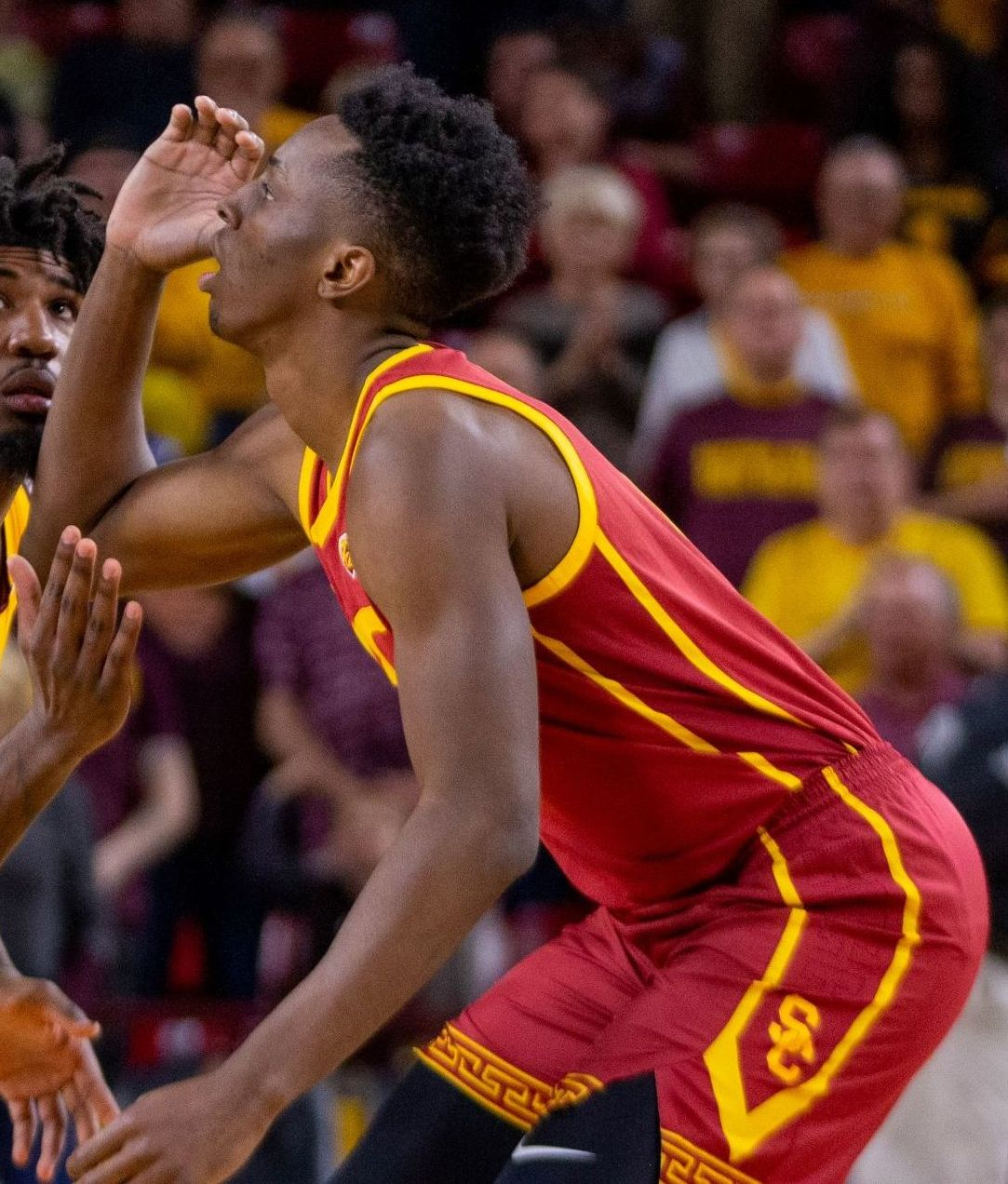
- Okongwu with USC in 2020

No. 17 – Atlanta Hawks
- Position: Center / power forward
- League: NBA

Personal information
- Born: December 11, 2000 (age 25) Los Angeles, California, U.S.
- Listed height: 6 ft 10 in (2.08 m)
- Listed weight: 240 lb (109 kg)

Career information
- High school: Chino Hills (Chino Hills, California)
- College: USC (2019–2020)
- NBA draft: 2020: 1st round, 6th overall pick
- Drafted by: Atlanta Hawks
- Playing career: 2020–present

Career history
- 2020–present: Atlanta Hawks

Career highlights
- First-team All-Pac-12 (2020); 2× California Mr. Basketball (2018, 2019)
- Stats at NBA.com
- Stats at Basketball Reference

Onyeka Okongwu (born December 11, 2000) is an American professional basketball player for the Atlanta Hawks of the National Basketball Association (NBA). He played college basketball for the USC Trojans.

Okongwu was a four-year starter at Chino Hills High School in California, playing alongside the Ball brothers, Lonzo, LiAngelo, and LaMelo Ball for his first two years. As a freshman, he helped his team win the state championship and achieve national success, while being named MaxPreps co-National Freshman of the Year. In his junior and senior seasons, Okongwu led Chino Hills to two more state titles, earning back-to-back California Mr. Basketball honors. He was considered a five-star recruit by ESPN and Rivals. In his only college season, Okongwu played for USC and was named to the first-team All-Pac-12.

== Early life ==
Highly influenced by his older brother, Nnamdi, Onyeka grew a passion for basketball. Onyeka initially started playing around the age of 8 for Edge Basketball, a club program. At age 11, Onyeka began playing for another program, RC Rebels, until he attended high school.

While attending high school, Okongwu played alongside Jaylen Hands on the Compton Magic.

== High school career ==
Okongwu attended Chino Hills High School in Chino Hills, California, and started on the varsity basketball team since his freshman season. In his first year, he was teammates with brothers Lonzo, LiAngelo, and LaMelo Ball, who helped elevate the team into the national spotlight. His team ranked number one in the country with a 35–0 record and captured the California Interscholastic Federation (CIF) Open Division state title. Okongwu shared MaxPreps National Freshman of the Year honors with his teammate, LaMelo Ball, after averaging 7.9 points, 7.2 rebounds, and 3.1 blocks per game.

As a sophomore, Okongwu helped Chino Hills reach the CIF Southern Section Open Division semifinals and the CIF State Southern Regional semifinals. In his junior season, he led his team to CIF Southern Section Division I and CIF Division I championships. He averaged 28 points, 14 rebounds, and four blocks per game, earning California Mr. Basketball and USA Today All-USA California first team honors. As a senior, Okongwu led Chino Hills to a runner-up finish at the CIF Southern Section Division I tournament and its second consecutive CIF Division I state title. After averaging 27 points, 11 rebounds, 4.3 blocks, and four assists per game, he repeated as California Mr. Basketball, becoming the fifth player to ever do so, and received USA Today All-USA California first team distinction.

=== Recruiting ===
Okongwu finished his freshman season with offers to play college basketball for UCLA and USC. On May 14, 2018, he committed to USC over UCLA and Arizona State. He was drawn to the program because of its proximity and coaching staff. Okongwu left high school as a five-star recruit on ESPN and Rivals and as a four-star recruit on 247Sports.

College recruiting
Name	Hometown	School	Height	Weight	Commit date
Onyeka Okongwu; PF	Chino Hills, CA	Chino Hills (CA)	6 ft 8 in (2.03 m)	225 lb (102 kg)	May 14, 2018
Onyeka Okongwu; PF	Recruit ratings: Rivals: 247Sports: ESPN: (93)				
Overall recruit ranking: Rivals: 30 247Sports: 27 ESPN: 20
Note: In many cases, Scout, Rivals, 247Sports, On3, and ESPN may conflict in their listings of height and weight.; In these cases, the average was taken. ESPN grades are on a 100-point scale.; Sources: "USC 2019 Basketball Commitments". Rivals.; "2019 USC Trojans Recruiting Class". ESPN.; "2019 Team Ranking". Rivals.

== College career ==
Okongwu immediately established himself as USC's best player. In his collegiate debut on November 5, 2019, he recorded 20 points, 13 rebounds and a school-record eight blocks to lead the Trojans to a 77–48 victory over Florida A&M. He became the first USC player to post a double-double in his debut since Taj Gibson in 2006. On November 19, he scored a career-high 33 points, including 17 free throws, in a 91–84 win over Pepperdine. The performance helped him claim Pac-12 Conference player and freshman of the week honors on November 25. On December 1, Okongwu recorded 27 points on 12-of-14 shooting, 14 rebounds and three blocks in a 77–62 victory over Harvard at the Orlando Invitational. He scored 28 points, 24 of which came in the second half, and grabbed 12 rebounds in a December 15 win over Long Beach State. One day later, Okongwu was named Pac-12 freshman of the week for his second time.

Okongwu continued his consistency into the Pac-12 season. On January 2, 2020, he had another strong performance, with 27 points on 12-of-14 shooting and 12 rebounds in a 65–56 win over Washington State. On January 24, he tallied 23 points, 14 rebounds and six blocks in a 79–70 double-overtime loss to Oregon. At the conclusion of the regular season, Okongwu was named to the first team All-Pac-12 and the Pac-12 All-Freshman Team. He led USC with 16.2 points, 8.6 rebounds and 2.7 blocks per game. The Pac-12 tournament and the NCAA tournament were canceled due to concerns over the COVID-19 pandemic. On March 25, 2020, Okongwu announced that he would enter the 2020 NBA draft and forgo his final three years of college basketball eligibility. Analysts regarded him as one of the best prospects in the draft.

== Professional career ==
=== Atlanta Hawks (2020–present) ===
Okongwu was selected with the sixth overall pick in the 2020 NBA draft by the Atlanta Hawks. On November 24, 2020, the Hawks announced that they had signed Okongwu.

On July 21, 2021, the Atlanta Hawks announced that Okongwu had undergone surgery to repair a torn labrum in his right shoulder and Okongwu would be expected to be sidelined for about six months.

On January 13, 2023, Okongwu put up a career-high 20 rebounds alongside 18 points in a 113–111 win over the Indiana Pacers.

On October 23, 2023, Okongwu signed a four-year, $62 million extension with the Hawks.

On January 14, 2025, Okongwu put up 22 points and 21 rebounds in a 122–117 win over the Phoenix Suns. He became the first player to record at least 20 points and 20 rebounds in a game off the bench in Hawks franchise history. On January 21, Okongwu was moved into the starting lineup in place of Clint Capela.

On November 13, 2025, Okongwu recorded 32 points, 11 rebounds, 2 steals and 3 blocks, including 8 three pointers in the Atlanta Hawks’ 132–122 win over the Utah Jazz. The performance marked a career high in points and made three pointers. Okongwu became the third player in NBA history to record at least 30 points, 10 rebounds, 2 steals, 2 blocks, and 8 three pointers in a single game, joining LeBron James and James Harden.

== Career statistics ==
Legend
GP	Games played	GS	Games started	MPG	Minutes per game
FG%	Field goal percentage	3P%	3-point field goal percentage	FT%	Free throw percentage
RPG	Rebounds per game	APG	Assists per game	SPG	Steals per game
BPG	Blocks per game	PPG	Points per game	**Bold**	Career high

=== NBA ===
==== Regular season ====
Year	Team	GP	GS	MPG	FG%	3P%	FT%	RPG	APG	SPG	BPG	PPG
2020–21	Atlanta	50	4	12.0	.644	.000	.632	3.3	.4	.5	.7	4.6
2021–22	Atlanta	48	6	20.7	**.690**	—	.727	5.9	1.1	.6	**1.3**	8.2
2022–23	Atlanta	**80**	18	23.1	.638	.308	.781	7.2	1.0	.7	**1.3**	9.9
2023–24	Atlanta	55	8	25.5	.611	.333	**.793**	6.8	1.3	.5	1.1	10.2
2024–25	Atlanta	74	40	27.9	.567	.324	.759	**8.9**	2.3	.9	.9	13.4
2025–26	Atlanta	74	**63**	**31.0**	.480	**.376**	.757	7.6	**3.1**	**1.1**	1.1	**15.2**
Career		381	139	24.2	.573	.356	.756	6.9	1.6	.8	1.1	10.7

==== Playoffs ====
Year	Team	GP	GS	MPG	FG%	3P%	FT%	RPG	APG	SPG	BPG	PPG
2021	Atlanta	**18**	0	9.2	.548	.000	.667	2.7	.1	.3	.7	2.7
2022	Atlanta	5	1	21.6	.563	—	**.800**	5.4	.4	.8	.8	5.2
2023	Atlanta	6	0	21.9	**.600**	**1.000**	.500	6.3	1.2	.3	**1.3**	6.0
2026	Atlanta	6	**6**	**33.2**	.583	.455	.750	**6.7**	**2.3**	**1.2**	.8	**12.5**
Career		35	7	17.3	.575	.458	.679	4.4	.7	.5	.9	5.3

=== College ===
Year	Team	GP	GS	MPG	FG%	3P%	FT%	RPG	APG	SPG	BPG	PPG
2019–20	USC	28	28	30.6	.616	.250	.720	8.6	1.1	1.2	2.7	16.2

== Personal life ==
Onyeka Okongwu was born to Nigerian immigrants, Mike, and Kate Okongwu in Los Angeles on 11 December 2000. Onyeka and his siblings were raised in Chino. His mother works as a registered nurse. Highly influenced by his older brother, Nnamdi, Onyeka's passion for basketball began to grow. Okongwu's older brother, Nnamdi, also played basketball for Chino Hills High School. In 2014, Nnamdi sustained a brain injury in a skateboarding accident and later died after spending three days on life support. Okongwu wore the number 21 in honor of his brother, who had worn the same number while playing basketball. In January 2020, Chino Hills High School retired the number in honor of his late brother. Upon his arrival in Atlanta, he switched numbers due to the team retiring the number 21 in honor of Dominique Wilkins. Again honoring his late brother, Okongwu began wearing the number 17 - the age Nnamdi was when he passed. He also has a younger brother, Chukwuemeka (Also attended Chino Hills High School), and a younger sister, Chinemya.

Okongwu's father died in 2021.
