= 2024–25 Atlanta Hawks season =

- Head coach: Quin Snyder
- General manager: Landry Fields
- Owner: Tony Ressler
- Arena: State Farm Arena

Results
- Record: 40–42 (.488)
- Place: Division: 2nd (Southeast); Conference: 8th (Eastern)
- Playoff finish: Did not qualify
- Stats at Basketball Reference

Local media
- Television: FanDuel Sports Network South; FanDuel Sports Network Southeast; WPCH-TV & Peachtree Sports Network (5 games)
- Radio: 92.9 FM "The Game"

The 2024–25 Atlanta Hawks season was the 76th season of the franchise in the National Basketball Association (NBA) and 57th in Atlanta. It was the second full season under head coach Quin Snyder. The Hawks won the draft lottery, becoming the first play-in tournament team to do without any trades involved, and selected Zaccharie Risacher with the first overall pick.

The Hawks advanced to the knockout stage of the 2024 NBA Cup after winning East Group C with a 3–1 group stage record, earning the berth over the defending NBA champions Boston Celtics by virtue of their head-to-head win on November 12. They defeated the New York Knicks in the quarterfinals but were eliminated in the semifinals by the eventual Cup champions Milwaukee Bucks.

On April 5, the Hawks would gain their fourth consecutive play-in berth following their loss to the New York Knicks. With a win against the Utah Jazz the next day, the Hawks improved from their 36-win 2023–24 season. They finished eighth in the East with a 40–42 record. However, they fell to the Orlando Magic in the first game of the play-in and were subsequently eliminated from playoff contention after a loss to the Miami Heat in the second game.

== Draft ==
Round	Pick	Player	Position	Nationality	School/Club team
1	1	Zaccharie Risacher	SF	France	LDLC ASVEL Basket

The Hawks entered the draft (which was two days instead of one for the first time since the NBA draft was shortened to two rounds back in 1989) holding only one first round pick. Despite only having a 3% chance, Atlanta won the draft lottery on May 12, awarding them with the first overall pick for the first time since 1975. This became the first time in NBA history that a play-in tournament team would win the NBA draft lottery without relying on a trade to do so since the Hawks were one of four teams eliminated from playoff contention via the tournament the previous season.

On the first night of the draft, the Hawks decided to select French small forward Zaccharie Risacher from the LDLC ASVEL Basket in the recently rebranded French LNB Élite as the #1 pick with their only selection. Atlanta wouldn't do anything during the second day as they had traded their second-round selection to the Portland Trail Blazers in 2023, though a trade made the day after the draft concluded officially had the Hawks trade for Nikola Đurišić from Serbia with the Miami Heat in a three-team deal that included the Houston Rockets.

== Roster ==
2024–25 Atlanta Hawks roster
Players

Pos.	No.	Player	Height	Weight	DOB	From
F	0	Dominick Barlow	6 ft 8 in (2.03 m)	215 lb (98 kg)	2003-05-26	Dumont HS (NJ)
G	4	Kobe Bufkin (injured)	6 ft 4 in (1.93 m)	195 lb (88 kg)	2003-09-21	Michigan
C	15	Clint Capela	6 ft 10 in (2.08 m)	256 lb (116 kg)	1994-05-18	Switzerland
G	5	Dyson Daniels	6 ft 7 in (2.01 m)	199 lb (90 kg)	2003-03-17	Australia
F	18	Mouhamed Gueye	6 ft 10 in (2.08 m)	210 lb (95 kg)	2002-11-09	Washington State
F	1	Jalen Johnson (injured)	6 ft 8 in (2.03 m)	219 lb (99 kg)	2001-12-18	Duke
G	27	Vít Krejčí	6 ft 8 in (2.03 m)	195 lb (88 kg)	2000-06-19	Czech Republic
G/F	3	Caris LeVert	6 ft 6 in (1.98 m)	205 lb (93 kg)	1994-08-25	Michigan
G/F	14	Terance Mann	6 ft 5 in (1.96 m)	215 lb (98 kg)	1996-10-18	Florida State
G	24	Garrison Mathews	6 ft 6 in (1.98 m)	215 lb (98 kg)	1996-10-2	Lipscomb
F	22	Larry Nance Jr.	6 ft 8 in (2.03 m)	245 lb (111 kg)	1993-01-01	Wyoming
F	20	Georges Niang	6 ft 7 in (2.01 m)	230 lb (104 kg)	1993-06-17	Iowa State
F/C	17	Onyeka Okongwu	6 ft 10 in (2.08 m)	240 lb (109 kg)	2000-12-11	USC
G/F	29	Daeqwon Plowden (TW)	6 ft 6 in (1.98 m)	215 lb (98 kg)	1998-08-29	Bowling Green
F	10	Zaccharie Risacher	6 ft 8 in (2.03 m)	200 lb (91 kg)	2005-04-08	France
F	00	Jacob Toppin (TW)	6 ft 8 in (2.03 m)	200 lb (91 kg)	2000-05-08	Kentucky
G	2	Keaton Wallace (TW)	6 ft 3 in (1.91 m)	185 lb (84 kg)	1999-02-26	UTSA
G	11	Trae Young	6 ft 1 in (1.85 m)	164 lb (74 kg)	1998-09-19	Oklahoma

Coaches
Head coach
- Quin Snyder
Assistant(s)
- Bryan Bailey
- Mike Brey
- Brittni Donaldson
- Steve Klei
- Igor Kokoškov
- Antonio Lang
- Sanjay Lumpkin
- Ronald Nored
- Reggis Onwukamuche
- Ryan Schmidt
- Ekpe Udoh
- Jett Watkinson

Legend
- (DP) Unsigned draft pick
- (FA) Free agent
- (S) Suspended
- (GL) On assignment to G League affiliate
- (TW) Two-way affiliate player
- Injured

Roster
Updated: February 7, 2025

== Standings ==
=== Division ===
Southeast Division	W	L	PCT	GB	Home	Road	Div	GP
y – Orlando Magic	41	41	.500	–	22‍–‍19	19‍–‍22	12‍–‍4	82
pi – Atlanta Hawks	40	42	.488	1.0	21‍–‍19	19‍–‍23	10‍–‍6	82
x – Miami Heat	37	45	.451	4.0	19‍–‍22	18‍–‍23	10‍–‍6	82
Charlotte Hornets	19	63	.232	22.0	12‍–‍29	7‍–‍34	1‍–‍15	82
Washington Wizards	18	64	.220	23.0	8‍–‍33	10‍–‍31	7‍–‍9	82

=== Conference ===
Eastern Conference
#	Team	W	L	PCT	GB	GP
1	c – Cleveland Cavaliers *	64	18	.780	–	82
2	y – Boston Celtics *	61	21	.744	3.0	82
3	x – New York Knicks	51	31	.622	13.0	82
4	x – Indiana Pacers	50	32	.610	14.0	82
5	x – Milwaukee Bucks	48	34	.585	16.0	82
6	x – Detroit Pistons	44	38	.537	20.0	82
7	y – Orlando Magic *	41	41	.500	23.0	82
8	pi – Atlanta Hawks	40	42	.488	24.0	82
9	pi – Chicago Bulls	39	43	.476	25.0	82
10	x – Miami Heat	37	45	.451	27.0	82
11	Toronto Raptors	30	52	.366	34.0	82
12	Brooklyn Nets	26	56	.317	38.0	82
13	Philadelphia 76ers	24	58	.293	40.0	82
14	Charlotte Hornets	19	63	.232	45.0	82
15	Washington Wizards	18	64	.220	46.0	82

== Game log ==
=== Preseason ===
During the preseason, the Hawks would play their final games under what was previously named Bally Sports South and Bally Sports Southeast. Bally Sports would rebrand itself to the FanDuel Sports Network before the start of the regular season.

2024 preseason game log
Total: 1–3 (Home: 1–1; Road: 0–2)
Preseason: 1–3 (home: 1–1; road: 0–2)

Game	Date	Team	Score	High points	High rebounds	High assists	Location Attendance	Record
1	October 8	Indiana	W 131–130	Jalen Johnson (19)	Jalen Johnson (10)	Krejčí, Young (6)	State Farm Arena; 10,378	1–0
–	October 10	@ Miami	Postponed due to Hurricane Milton; Makeup date October 16					
2	October 14	Philadelphia	L 89–104	Zaccharie Risacher (14)	Larry Nance Jr. (10)	Trae Young (9)	State Farm Arena; 13,203	1–1
3	October 16	@ Miami	L 111–120	Jalen Johnson (21)	Daniels, Johnson (5)	Trae Young (7)	Kaseya Center; 19,600	1–2
4	October 17	@ Oklahoma City	L 99–104	Kobe Bufkin (31)	David Roddy (12)	Bufkin, Daniels, Krejčí, Roddy (4)	Paycom Center	1–3

2024–25 preseason schedule

=== Regular season ===
2024–25 game log
Total: 40–42 (Home: 21–19; Road: 19–23)
October: 2–3 (home: 2–1; road: 0–2)

Game	Date	Team	Score	High points	High rebounds	High assists	Location Attendance	Record
1	October 23	Brooklyn	W 120–116	Trae Young (30)	Jalen Johnson (10)	Trae Young (12)	State Farm Arena; 17,548	1–0
2	October 25	Charlotte	W 125–120	Trae Young (38)	Okongwu, Young (8)	Trae Young (10)	State Farm Arena; 14,433	2–0
3	October 27	@ Oklahoma City	L 104–128	Trae Young (24)	Clint Capela (10)	Trae Young (8)	Paycom Center; 18,203	2–1
4	October 28	Washington	L 119–121	Jalen Johnson (29)	Jalen Johnson (12)	Trae Young (13)	State Farm Arena; 14,566	2–2
5	October 30	@ Washington	L 120–133	Trae Young (35)	Jalen Johnson (17)	Trae Young (15)	Capital One Arena; 14,255	2–3

November: 8–8 (home: 3–4; road: 5–4)

Game	Date	Team	Score	High points	High rebounds	High assists	Location Attendance	Record
6	November 1	Sacramento	L 115–123	Trae Young (25)	Clint Capela (10)	Trae Young (12)	State Farm Arena; 15,156	2–4
7	November 3	@ New Orleans	W 126–111	Jalen Johnson (29)	Jalen Johnson (9)	Trae Young (12)	Smoothie King Center; 15,505	3–4
8	November 4	Boston	L 93–123	Jalen Johnson (20)	Jalen Johnson (11)	Trae Young (6)	State Farm Arena; 15,031	3–5
9	November 6	New York	W 121–116	Zaccharie Risacher (33)	Jalen Johnson (15)	Trae Young (10)	State Farm Arena; 16,072	4–5
10	November 8	@ Detroit	L 121–122	Trae Young (35)	Clint Capela (12)	Trae Young (13)	Little Caesars Arena; 17,913	4–6
11	November 9	Chicago	L 113–125	Capela, Johnson (20)	Clint Capela (9)	Trae Young (16)	State Farm Arena; 17,826	4–7
12	November 12	@ Boston	W 117–116	Dyson Daniels (28)	Jalen Johnson (13)	Jalen Johnson (10)	TD Garden; 19,156	5–7
13	November 15	Washington	W 129–117	Dyson Daniels (25)	Capela, Johnson, Okongwu (13)	Trae Young (9)	State Farm Arena; 16,038	6–7
14	November 17	@ Portland	L 107–114	Trae Young (29)	Onyeka Okongwu (11)	Trae Young (8)	Moda Center; 17,384	6–8
15	November 18	@ Sacramento	W 109–108	De'Andre Hunter (24)	Clint Capela (14)	Trae Young (19)	Golden 1 Center; 16,333	7–8
16	November 20	@ Golden State	L 97–120	Jalen Johnson (15)	Jalen Johnson (14)	Trae Young (11)	Chase Center; 18,064	7–9
17	November 22	@ Chicago	L 122–136	Johnson, Young (25)	Jalen Johnson (13)	Trae Young (13)	United Center; 19,979	7–10
18	November 25	Dallas	L 119–129	Jalen Johnson (28)	Jalen Johnson (11)	Trae Young (16)	State Farm Arena; 17,186	7–11
19	November 27	@ Cleveland	W 135–124	De'Andre Hunter (26)	Dyson Daniels (10)	Trae Young (22)	Rocket Mortgage FieldHouse; 19,432	8–11
20	November 29	Cleveland	W 117–101	De'Andre Hunter (23)	Clint Capela (13)	Trae Young (11)	State Farm Arena; 17,881	9–11
21	November 30	@ Charlotte	W 107–104	Jalen Johnson (20)	Clint Capela (14)	Jalen Johnson (9)	Spectrum Center; 17,969	10–11

December: 8–4 (home: 5–2; road: 3–2)

Game	Date	Team	Score	High points	High rebounds	High assists	Location Attendance	Record
22	December 2	New Orleans	W 124–112	De'Andre Hunter (22)	Clint Capela (17)	Trae Young (15)	State Farm Arena; 15,034	11–11
23	December 4	@ Milwaukee	W 119–104	Jalen Johnson (23)	Clint Capela (17)	Trae Young (7)	Fiserv Forum; 17,341	12–11
24	December 6	L.A. Lakers	W 134–132 (OT)	Trae Young (31)	Jalen Johnson (10)	Trae Young (20)	State Farm Arena; 18,040	13–11
25	December 8	Denver	L 111–141	De'Andre Hunter (20)	Clint Capela (10)	Trae Young (10)	State Farm Arena; 16,137	13–12
26	December 11	@ New York	W 108–100	De'Andre Hunter (24)	Jalen Johnson (15)	Trae Young (11)	Madison Square Garden; 19,812	14–12
27	December 14	@ Milwaukee	L 102–110	Trae Young (35)	Jalen Johnson (10)	Trae Young (10)	T-Mobile Arena; 17,113	14–13
28	December 19	@ San Antonio	L 126–133 (OT)	De'Andre Hunter (27)	Larry Nance Jr. (13)	Trae Young (16)	Frost Bank Center; 17,852	14–14
29	December 21	Memphis	L 112–128	De'Andre Hunter (26)	Jalen Johnson (11)	Jalen Johnson (8)	State Farm Arena; 16,909	14–15
30	December 23	Minnesota	W 117–104	Trae Young (29)	Jalen Johnson (11)	Johnson, Young (7)	State Farm Arena; 17,051	15–15
31	December 26	Chicago	W 141–133	Jalen Johnson (30)	Jalen Johnson (15)	Trae Young (13)	State Farm Arena; 17,760	16–15
32	December 28	Miami	W 120–110	Jalen Johnson (28)	Jalen Johnson (13)	Trae Young (15)	State Farm Arena; 17,856	17–15
33	December 29	@ Toronto	W 136–107	Trae Young (34)	Clint Capela (12)	Trae Young (10)	Scotiabank Arena; 19,359	18–15

January: 4–11 (home: 1–4; road: 3–7)

Game	Date	Team	Score	High points	High rebounds	High assists	Location Attendance	Record
34	January 1	@ Denver	L 120–139	Trae Young (30)	Capela, Okongwu (7)	Trae Young (9)	Ball Arena; 19,902	18–16
35	January 3	@ L.A. Lakers	L 102–119	Trae Young (33)	Onyeka Okongwu (11)	Trae Young (9)	Crypto.com Arena; 18,997	18–17
36	January 4	@ L.A. Clippers	L 105–131	Trae Young (20)	Mathews, Okongwu (8)	Trae Young (14)	Intuit Dome; 17,927	18–18
37	January 7	@ Utah	W 124–121	Trae Young (24)	Onyeka Okongwu (9)	Trae Young (20)	Delta Center; 18,175	19–18
38	January 9	@ Phoenix	L 115–123	Trae Young (21)	Clint Capela (11)	Trae Young (7)	Footprint Center; 17,071	19–19
—	January 11	Houston	Postponed due to a winter storm, rescheduled to January 28					
39	January 14	Phoenix	W 122–117	Trae Young (43)	Onyeka Okongwu (21)	Vít Krejčí (6)	State Farm Arena; 16,221	20–19
40	January 15	@ Chicago	W 110–94	Keaton Wallace (27)	Onyeka Okongwu (13)	Onyeka Okongwu (7)	United Center; 17,692	21–19
41	January 18	@ Boston	W 119–115 (OT)	Trae Young (28)	Johnson, Okongwu (13)	Trae Young (11)	TD Garden; 19,156	22–19
42	January 20	@ New York	L 110–119	Trae Young (27)	Jalen Johnson (12)	Trae Young (6)	Madison Square Garden; 19,812	22–20
43	January 22	Detroit	L 104–114	Dyson Daniels (20)	Capela, Daniels, Okongwu (10)	Trae Young (9)	State Farm Arena; 13,983	22–21
44	January 23	Toronto	L 119–122	Bogdan Bogdanović (23)	Onyeka Okongwu (12)	Trae Young (13)	State Farm Arena; 14,662	22–22
45	January 25	Toronto	L 94–117	Vít Krejčí (20)	Onyeka Okongwu (8)	Vít Krejčí (7)	State Farm Arena; 17,868	22–23
46	January 27	@ Minnesota	L 92–100	De'Andre Hunter (35)	Clint Capela (15)	Keaton Wallace (7)	Target Center; 18,978	22–24
47	January 28	Houston	L 96–100	Trae Young (21)	Dyson Daniels (10)	Trae Young (9)	State Farm Arena; 15,553	22–25
48	January 30	@ Cleveland	L 115–137	Zaccharie Risacher (30)	Daniels, Okongwu (7)	Trae Young (10)	Rocket Mortgage FieldHouse; 19,432	22–26

February: 5–7 (home: 2–4; road: 3–3)

Game	Date	Team	Score	High points	High rebounds	High assists	Location Attendance	Record
49	February 1	@ Indiana	L 127–132	Trae Young (34)	Onyeka Okongwu (11)	Trae Young (17)	Gainbridge Fieldhouse; 17,274	22–27
50	February 3	@ Detroit	W 132–130	Trae Young (34)	Larry Nance Jr. (10)	Trae Young (9)	Little Caesars Arena; 15,988	23–27
51	February 5	San Antonio	L 125–126	Trae Young (32)	Onyeka Okongwu (12)	Trae Young (12)	State Farm Arena; 17,191	23–28
52	February 7	Milwaukee	W 115–110	Trae Young (24)	Okongwu, Gueye (12)	Dyson Daniels (10)	State Farm Arena; 16,378	24–28
53	February 8	@ Washington	W 125–111	Trae Young (35)	Dyson Daniels (9)	Trae Young (14)	Capital One Arena; 16,835	25–28
54	February 10	@ Orlando	W 112–106	Trae Young (19)	Caris LeVert (8)	Trae Young (8)	Kia Center; 18,055	26–28
55	February 12	@ New York	L 148–149 (OT)	Trae Young (38)	Onyeka Okongwu (14)	Trae Young (19)	Madison Square Garden; 19,812	26–29
All-Star Game
56	February 20	Orlando	L 108–114	Trae Young (38)	Zaccharie Risacher (12)	Trae Young (6)	State Farm Arena; 16,436	26–30
57	February 23	Detroit	L 143–148	Trae Young (38)	Onyeka Okongwu (9)	Trae Young (13)	State Farm Arena; 17,051	26–31
58	February 24	Miami	W 98–86	Onyeka Okongwu (17)	Capela, Daniels (11)	Trae Young (14)	State Farm Arena; 16,189	27–31
59	February 26	@ Miami	L 109–131	Dyson Daniels (18)	Onyeka Okongwu (9)	Trae Young (8)	Kaseya Center; 19,600	27–32
60	February 28	Oklahoma City	L 119–135	LeVert, Okongwu (23)	Onyeka Okongwu (13)	Trae Young (12)	State Farm Arena; 17,712	27–33

March: 9–5 (home: 6–2; road: 3–3)

Game	Date	Team	Score	High points	High rebounds	High assists	Location Attendance	Record
61	March 3	@ Memphis	W 132–130	Zaccharie Risacher (27)	Onyeka Okongwu (12)	Trae Young (15)	FedExForum; 15,719	28–33
62	March 4	Milwaukee	L 121–127	Trae Young (28)	Daniels, Okongwu (9)	Trae Young (13)	State Farm Arena; 16,008	28–34
63	March 6	Indiana	W 124–118	Georges Niang (24)	Onyeka Okongwu (13)	Trae Young (16)	State Farm Arena; 15,656	29–34
64	March 8	Indiana	W 120–118	Trae Young (36)	Onyeka Okongwu (16)	Trae Young (8)	State Farm Arena; 17,057	30–34
65	March 10	Philadelphia	W 132–123	Dyson Daniels (25)	Clint Capela (9)	Dyson Daniels (9)	State Farm Arena; 15,269	31–34
66	March 12	Charlotte	W 123–110	Trae Young (35)	Onyeka Okongwu (10)	Trae Young (12)	State Farm Arena; 15,901	32–34
67	March 14	L.A. Clippers	L 98–121	Onyeka Okongwu (18)	Onyeka Okongwu (10)	Trae Young (7)	State Farm Arena; 16,561	32–35
68	March 16	@ Brooklyn	L 114–122	Trae Young (28)	Onyeka Okongwu (15)	Trae Young (12)	Barclays Center; 17,926	32–36
69	March 18	@ Charlotte	W 134–102	Trae Young (31)	Onyeka Okongwu (10)	Trae Young (8)	Spectrum Center; 15,341	33–36
70	March 22	Golden State	W 124–115	Trae Young (25)	Onyeka Okongwu (12)	Trae Young (10)	State Farm Arena; 17,864	34–36
71	March 23	Philadelphia	W 132–119	Trae Young (28)	Dominick Barlow (10)	Trae Young (12)	State Farm Arena; 16,161	35–36
72	March 25	@ Houston	L 114–121	Daniels, Young (19)	Onyeka Okongwu (15)	Trae Young (12)	Toyota Center; 16,817	35–37
73	March 27	@ Miami	L 112–122	Trae Young (29)	Onyeka Okongwu (9)	Trae Young (12)	Kaseya Center; 19,700	35–38
74	March 30	@ Milwaukee	W 145–124	Zaccharie Risacher (36)	Onyeka Okongwu (10)	Trae Young (19)	Fiserv Forum; 17,341	36–38

April: 4–4 (home: 2–2; road: 2–2)

Game	Date	Team	Score	High points	High rebounds	High assists	Location Attendance	Record
75	April 1	Portland	L 113–127	Trae Young (29)	Dyson Daniels (10)	Trae Young (15)	State Farm Arena; 17,124	36–39
76	April 2	@ Dallas	L 118–120	Trae Young (25)	Onyeka Okongwu (14)	Trae Young (12)	American Airlines Center; 19,977	36–40
77	April 5	New York	L 105–121	Trae Young (16)	Terance Mann (6)	Trae Young (9)	State Farm Arena; 16,199	36–41
78	April 6	Utah	W 147–134	Onyeka Okongwu (27)	Onyeka Okongwu (12)	Trae Young (15)	State Farm Arena; 16,331	37–41
79	April 8	@ Orlando	L 112–119	Onyeka Okongwu (30)	Onyeka Okongwu (14)	Trae Young (10)	Kia Center; 18,846	37–42
80	April 10	@ Brooklyn	W 133–109	Zaccharie Risacher (38)	Onyeka Okongwu (15)	Trae Young (12)	Barclays Center; 17,926	38–42
81	April 11	@ Philadelphia	W 124–110	Trae Young (36)	Mouhamed Gueye (18)	Trae Young (11)	Wells Fargo Center; 19,752	39–42
82	April 13	Orlando	W 117–105	Terance Mann (19)	Keaton Wallace (11)	Keaton Wallace (15)	State Farm Arena; 17,714	40–42

2024–25 season schedule

=== Play-in ===
2025 play-in game log
Total: 0–2 (Home: 0–1; Road: 0–1)
Play-in: 0–2 (home: 0–1; road: 0–1)

Game	Date	Team	Score	High points	High rebounds	High assists	Location Attendance	Record
1	April 15	@ Orlando	L 95–120	Trae Young (28)	Dyson Daniels (12)	Dyson Daniels (7)	Kia Center; 18,846	0–1
2	April 18	Miami	L 114–123 (OT)	Trae Young (29)	Onyeka Okongwu (12)	Trae Young (11)	State Farm Arena; 17,690	0–2

2024–25 season schedule

=== NBA Cup ===
The groups were revealed during the tournament announcement on July 12, 2024.

==== East Group C ====
Pos	Team	Pld	W	L	PF	PA	PD	Qualification
1	Atlanta Hawks	4	3	1	485	470	+15	Advance to knockout stage
2	Boston Celtics	4	3	1	482	459	+23	
3	Cleveland Cavaliers	4	2	2	480	450	+30	
4	Chicago Bulls	4	2	2	518	512	+6	
5	Washington Wizards	4	0	4	408	482	−74	

Source: NBA
Rules for classification: Tiebreakers

2024–25 game log
Total: 4–2 (Home: 2–0; Road: 2–1; Neutral: 0–1)
NBA Cup

Game	Date	Team	Score	High points	High rebounds	High assists	Location Attendance	Record
1	November 12	@ Boston	W 117–116	Dyson Daniels (28)	Jalen Johnson (13)	Jalen Johnson (10)	TD Garden; 19,156	1–0
2	November 15	Washington	W 129–117	Dyson Daniels (25)	Capela, Johnson, Okongwu (13)	Trae Young (9)	State Farm Arena; 16,038	2–0
3	November 22	@ Chicago	L 122–136	Johnson, Young (25)	Jalen Johnson (13)	Trae Young (13)	United Center; 19,979	2–1
4	November 29	Cleveland	W 117–101	De'Andre Hunter (23)	Clint Capela (13)	Trae Young (11)	State Farm Arena; 17,881	3–1
QF	December 11	@ New York	W 108–100	De'Andre Hunter (24)	Jalen Johnson (15)	Trae Young (11)	Madison Square Garden; 19,812	4–1
SF	December 14	Milwaukee	L 102–110	Trae Young (35)	Jalen Johnson (10)	Trae Young (10)	T-Mobile Arena; 17,113	4–2

== Player statistics ==
Legend
GP	Games played	GS	Games started	MPG	Minutes per game
FG%	Field-goal percentage	3P%	3-point field-goal percentage	FT%	Free-throw percentage
RPG	Rebounds per game	APG	Assists per game	SPG	Steals per game
BPG	Blocks per game	PPG	Points per game

=== Regular season ===
Player	GP	GS	MPG	FG%	3P%	FT%	RPG	APG	SPG	BPG	PPG
Dominick Barlow	35	4	10.7	.531	.259	.636	2.4	0.5	0.3	0.5	4.2
Bogdan Bogdanović^{‡}	24	0	24.9	.371	.301	.882	2.8	2.0	0.8	0.3	10.0
Kobe Bufkin	10	0	12.4	.383	.211	.722	2.1	1.7	0.3	0.2	5.3
Clint Capela	55	41	21.4	.559	.000	.536	8.5	1.1	0.6	1.0	8.9
Dyson Daniels	76	76	33.8	.493	.340	.593	5.9	4.4	3.0	0.7	14.1
Mouhamed Gueye	33	28	16.1	.421	.259	.762	4.2	0.8	0.8	1.0	6.0
De'Andre Hunter^{‡}	37	4	28.7	.461	.393	.858	3.9	1.5	0.8	0.1	19.0
Jalen Johnson	36	36	35.7	.500	.312	.746	10.0	5.0	1.6	1.0	18.9
Vít Krejčí	57	16	20.2	.497	.437	.711	2.7	2.6	0.6	0.5	7.2
Caris LeVert^{≠}	26	0	26.6	.482	.338	.722	3.7	2.9	0.9	0.5	14.9
Terance Mann^{≠}	30	1	22.7	.541	.386	.667	3.1	2.1	0.6	0.1	9.8
Garrison Mathews	47	2	17.7	.397	.390	.821	1.9	1.3	0.6	0.3	7.5
Larry Nance Jr.	24	3	19.3	.516	.447	.692	4.3	1.6	0.8	0.5	8.5
Georges Niang^{≠}	28	2	23.0	.441	.413	.793	3.0	1.6	0.4	0.3	12.1
Onyeka Okongwu	74	40	27.9	.567	.324	.759	8.9	2.3	0.9	0.9	13.4
Daeqwon Plowden	6	0	11.9	.640	.529	1.000	1.8	0.3	0.0	0.0	7.2
Zaccharie Risacher	75	73	24.6	.458	.355	.711	3.6	1.2	0.7	0.5	12.6
David Roddy^{~}	27	3	12.8	.473	.372	.818	2.6	1.1	0.4	0.3	4.5
Jacob Toppin^{≠}	1	0	27.0	.500	.625	—	4.0	2.0	0.0	0.0	17.0
Keaton Wallace	31	5	16.2	.401	.329	1.000	1.6	2.6	0.9	0.3	5.4
Trae Young	76	76	36.0	.411	.340	.875	3.1	11.6	1.2	0.2	24.2

^{‡}Traded during the season
^{≠}Acquired during the season
^{~}Waived during the season
^{10}Signed 10-day contract

== Transactions ==
=== Contract Extensions ===
Date	Player	Signed	Ref.
June 29, 2024	Garrison Matthews	1 Year, $2.2 Million	
October 21, 2024	Jalen Johnson	5 Year, $150 Million	
March 3, 2025	Dominick Barlow	2 Year, $2.7 Million	

=== Trades ===
June 27,2024
June 27,2024	To Atlanta Hawks Draft rights to Nikola Djurišić (No. 43) (from Miami)	To Houston Rockets AJ Griffin (from Atlanta)
June 27,2024	To Miami Heat Draft rights to Pelle Larsson (No. 44) (from Houston); Cash considerations (from Atlanta)
June 28, 2024	To Atlanta Hawks Larry Nance Jr. Dyson Daniels; E. J. Liddell; Cody Zeller (sign-and-trade); 2025 LAL first-round pick 2027 first-round pick (Note: The less favorable of the picks originally belonging to Milwaukee Bucks and New Orleans.)	To New Orleans Pelicans Dejounte Murray
July 29, 2024	To Atlanta Hawks David Roddy	To Phoenix Suns E. J. Liddell
February 6, 2025	To Atlanta Hawks Draft rights to Alpha Kaba (2017 No. 60)	To Houston Rockets Cody Zeller; 2028 HOU second-round pick (Note: The team's own pick, which it previously traded away.)
February 6, 2025	To Atlanta Hawks Caris LeVert; Georges Niang; 2026 right to swap first-round picks 2027 DEN second-round pick 2028 right to swap first-round picks (Note: Atlanta will be able to swap its own pick for the less favorable of the picks originally belonging to Cleveland and Utah.); 2029 CLE second-round pick 2031 CLE second-round pick	To Cleveland Cavaliers De'Andre Hunter
February 6, 2025	To Atlanta Hawks Bones Hyland; Terance Mann	To Los Angeles Clippers Bogdan Bogdanović; 2025 MIN second-round pick 2026 MEM protected second-round pick (Note: The Clippers will receive the pick if it's No. 31–42.); 2027 LAC second-round pick

=== Free agency ===
==== Re-signed ====
Date	Player	Signed	Ref.
July 9, 2024	Seth Lundy	Two-Way Contract	
July 12, 2024	Vít Krejčí	4 Years, $10 Million	

==== Additions ====
Date	Player	Signed	Former team	Ref.
July 15, 2024	Keaton Wallace	Two-Way Contract	College Park Skyhawks	
July 30, 2024	Dominick Barlow	Two-Way Contract	San Antonio Spurs	
December 27, 2024	Daeqwon Plowden	Two-Way Contract	College Park Skyhawks	
March 1, 2025	Kevon Harris	10 Day Contract	College Park Skyhawks	
March 3, 2025	Jacob Toppin	Two-Way Contract	New York Knicks	

=== Subtractions ===
Date	Player	Reason	New team	Ref.
June 30, 2024	Wesley Matthews	Free Agent		
July 12, 2024	Saddiq Bey	Free Agent	Washington Wizards	
July 30, 2024	Bruno Fernando	Waived	Toronto Raptors	
August 8, 2024	Trent Forrest	Free Agent	(Spain) Saski Baskonia	
August 23, 2024	Dylan Windler	Free Agent	(Australia) Perth Wildcats	
December 18, 2024	Seth Lundy	Waived	Los Angeles Clippers	
February 7, 2025	David Roddy	Waived	Philadelphia 76ers	
February 8, 2025	Bones Hyland	Waived	Minnesota Timberwolves	
March 3, 2025	Kevon Harris	Waived	College Park Skyhawks	
