= Clint Capela =

Swiss basketball player (born 1994)

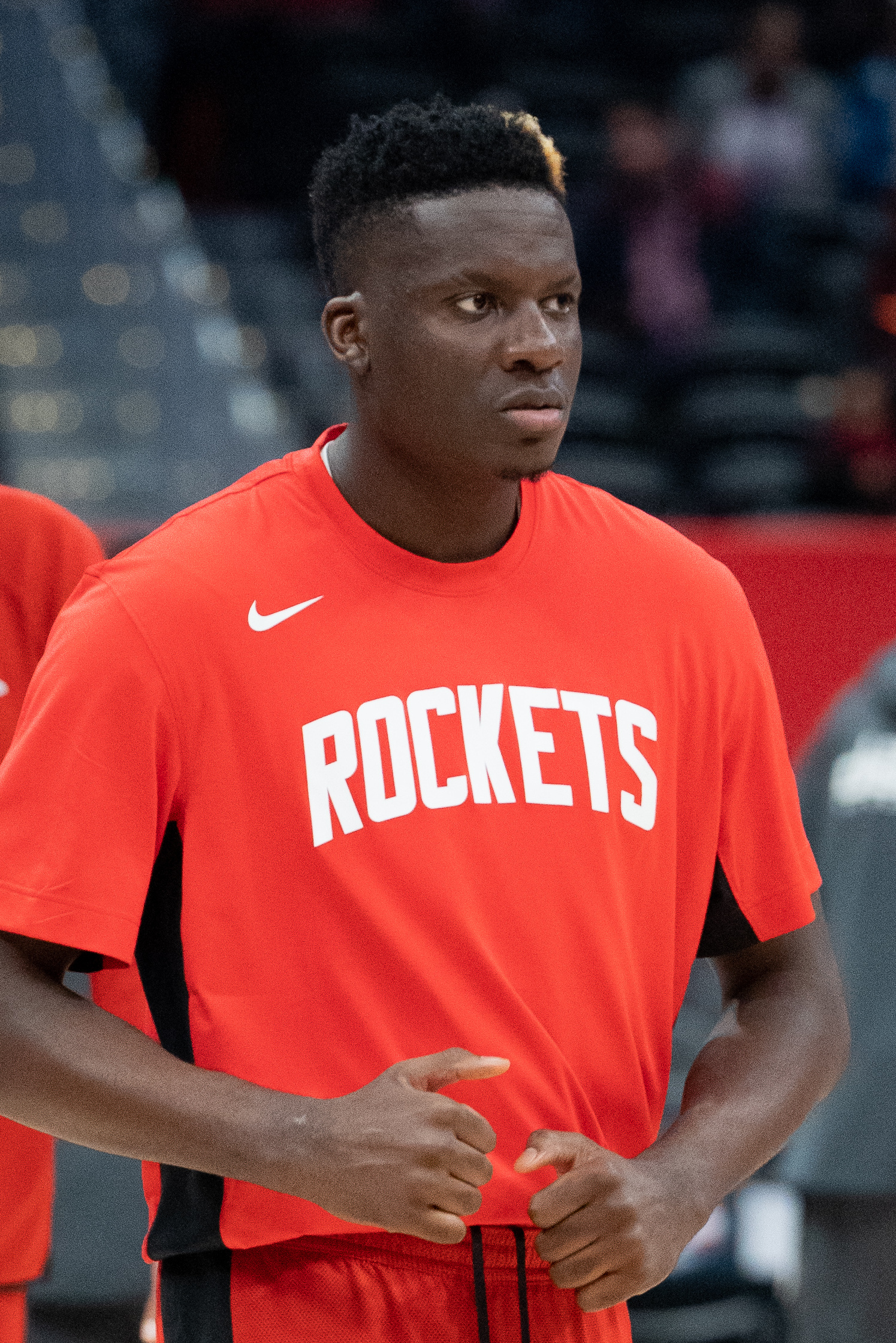
- Capela with the Houston Rockets in 2019

No. 30 – Houston Rockets
- Position: Center
- League: NBA

Personal information
- Born: May 18, 1994 (age 32) Geneva, Switzerland
- Listed height: 6 ft 10 in (2.08 m)
- Listed weight: 256 lb (116 kg)

Career information
- High school: INSEP (Paris, France)
- NBA draft: 2014: 1st round, 25th overall pick
- Drafted by: Houston Rockets
- Playing career: 2012–present

Career history
- 2012–2014: Élan Chalon
- 2014–2020: Houston Rockets
- 2014–2015: →Rio Grande Valley Vipers
- 2020–2025: Atlanta Hawks
- 2025–present: Houston Rockets

Career highlights
- NBA rebounding leader (2021); NBA D-League All-Defensive First Team (2015); Pro A Best Young Player (2014); Pro A Most Improved Player (2014)
- Stats at NBA.com
- Stats at Basketball Reference

Clint N'Dumba Capela (born May 18, 1994) is a Swiss professional basketball player for the Houston Rockets of the National Basketball Association (NBA). Known for his rebounding and shot-blocking abilities, he was selected with the 25th overall pick in the 2014 NBA draft by the Rockets. He is the highest-earning team athlete in Switzerland's history.

Capela began his professional career in 2012 with Élan Chalon of the LNB Pro A, where he played for two seasons and was honored as both the Pro A Best Young Player and Most Improved Player before declaring for the NBA draft in 2014. His breakout season came in 2016–17 with the Rockets, as he saw a substantial increase in his role as a center and a key defensive player. He achieved the league's highest field goal percentage during the 2017–18 season, his 62.1% career field goal accuracy is the fourth highest in NBA history, and has remained among the top players in rebounds and blocks, leading the NBA in rebounding during the 2020–21 season as a member of the Atlanta Hawks. He has represented the Swiss national team.

== Early years ==
Capela was born in Geneva, Switzerland, to an Angolan father and Congolese mother. His parents separated a few months after his birth, leaving his mother to raise him and his brothers by herself. He was raised partly in foster care. As a child, at first he liked soccer. Because he was 1.90 m (6 ft 3 in) as a 13-year-old, his brother suggested he switch sports. After meeting Swiss basketball icon Thabo Sefolosha, Capela became more and more fascinated with basketball. At 15 years old, he was spotted at the European Junior Championships with the Swiss team, and joined the Chalon-sur-Saône training center, INSEP, in France.

== Professional career ==
=== Élan Chalon (2012–2014) ===
In 2012, Capela joined the senior Élan Chalon team of the LNB Pro A.

On April 12, 2014, Capela represented the World Team at the 2014 Nike Hoop Summit. Later that month, he declared for the 2014 NBA draft. In May 2014, he was named the Best Young Player and Most Improved Player of the 2013–14 LNB Pro A season.

=== Houston Rockets (2014–2020) ===
On June 26, 2014, Capela was selected with the 25th overall pick in the 2014 NBA draft by the Houston Rockets. On July 25, 2014, he signed with the Rockets. On March 30, 2015, Capela scored his first NBA points, finishing the game with eight points and nine rebounds in a 99–96 loss to the Toronto Raptors. On April 13, he had a season-best game for the Rockets with 10 points and five rebounds in a win over the Charlotte Hornets. During his rookie season, he had multiple assignments with the Rio Grande Valley Vipers of the NBA Development League. Capela took a step forward in the postseason, when he saw minutes in place of the injured Donatas Motiejūnas. He appeared in more playoff games (17) than regular-season contests in 2014–15 and averaged 3.4 points in 7.5 minutes per postseason game.

In his second season, on November 6, 2015, Capela recorded his first career double-double with then-career highs of 13 points and 12 rebounds as a starter in a 116–110 win over the Sacramento Kings. On November 29, in an overtime win over the New York Knicks, Capela recorded his third double-double over a span of four games, including a career-high 18 points. During the 2016 NBA All-Star Weekend, Capela competed for the World Team in the Rising Stars Challenge. On April 13, in the Rockets' season finale, Capela recorded a career-high 17 rebounds in a 116–81 win over Sacramento.

On November 19, 2016, Capela scored a career-high 20 points in a 111–102 win over the Utah Jazz. On November 27, 2016, he set a new career high with 21 points against the Portland Trail Blazers. On December 19, 2016, he was ruled out for six weeks after suffering a broken fibula. He returned to action on January 17, 2017, against the Miami Heat after missing 15 games; he started the game against Miami but was scoreless in nine minutes.

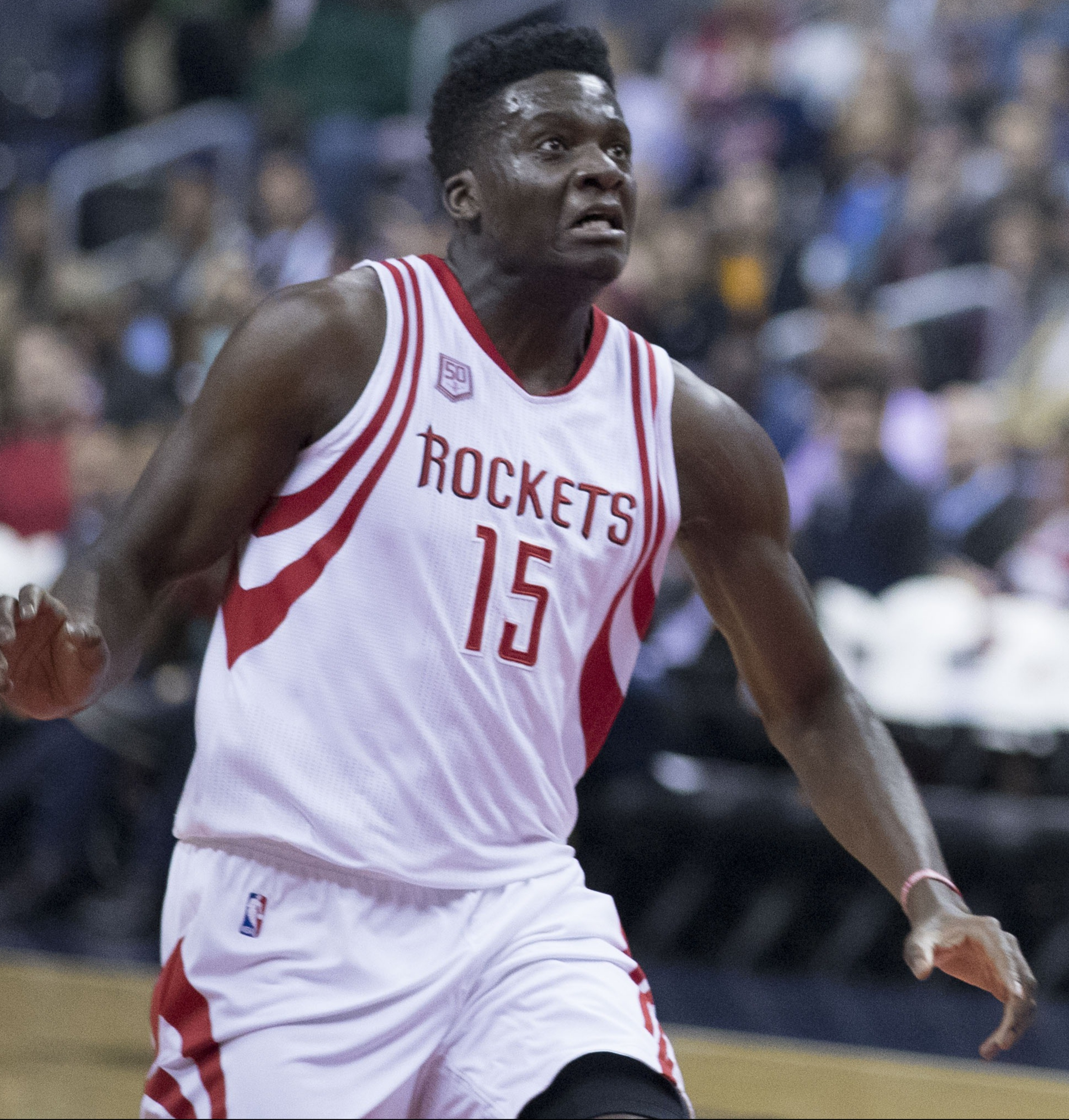
Capela with the Houston Rockets in 2016

On October 18, 2017, Capela had 22 points and matched his career high with 17 rebounds in a 105–100 win over the Sacramento Kings. On December 11, 2017, he had a career-high 28 points in a 130–123 win over the New Orleans Pelicans. By Christmas, Capela had accumulated 16 double-doubles in 28 games and ranked first in the NBA in field goal percentage. On February 9, 2018, he recorded 23 points and a career-high 25 rebounds in a 130–104 win over the Denver Nuggets, earning his first 20-point, 20-rebound game of his career. He became the youngest Rocket to have at least 23 points and 25 rebounds in a game since Hakeem Olajuwon had 30 points and 25 rebounds against the Knicks on February 14, 1985. Capela was runner-up for the NBA Most Improved Player Award in 2017–18 after averaging career highs of 13.9 points, 10.8 rebounds and 1.85 blocks. He led the league in field goal percentage (.653) and dunks (213) while ranking eighth in rebounding and second in blocks. In game 5 of the Rockets' first-round playoff series against the Minnesota Timberwolves, Capela had 26 points and 15 rebounds in a 122–104 series-clinching win.

After the 2017–18 season, Capela became a restricted free agent. On July 27, 2018, he signed a five-year, $90 million extension with the Rockets. On November 5, in a 98–94 win over the Indiana Pacers, Capela had 18 points and 10 rebounds for his sixth consecutive double-double, a career best. On December 22, he had 21 points and a season-high 23 rebounds in a 108–101 win over the San Antonio Spurs. On December 25, he had 16 points and tied a season high with 23 rebounds in a 113–109 win over the Oklahoma City Thunder. On January 7, he scored a career-high 31 points in a 125–113 win over the Denver Nuggets. On January 14, he was ruled out for four to six weeks with a right thumb injury that he suffered the previous night against the Orlando Magic. He returned to action on February 21 against the Los Angeles Lakers after missing 15 games. In March 2019, he had a career-best streak (12) of games with at least 10 rebounds.

=== Atlanta Hawks (2020–2025) ===
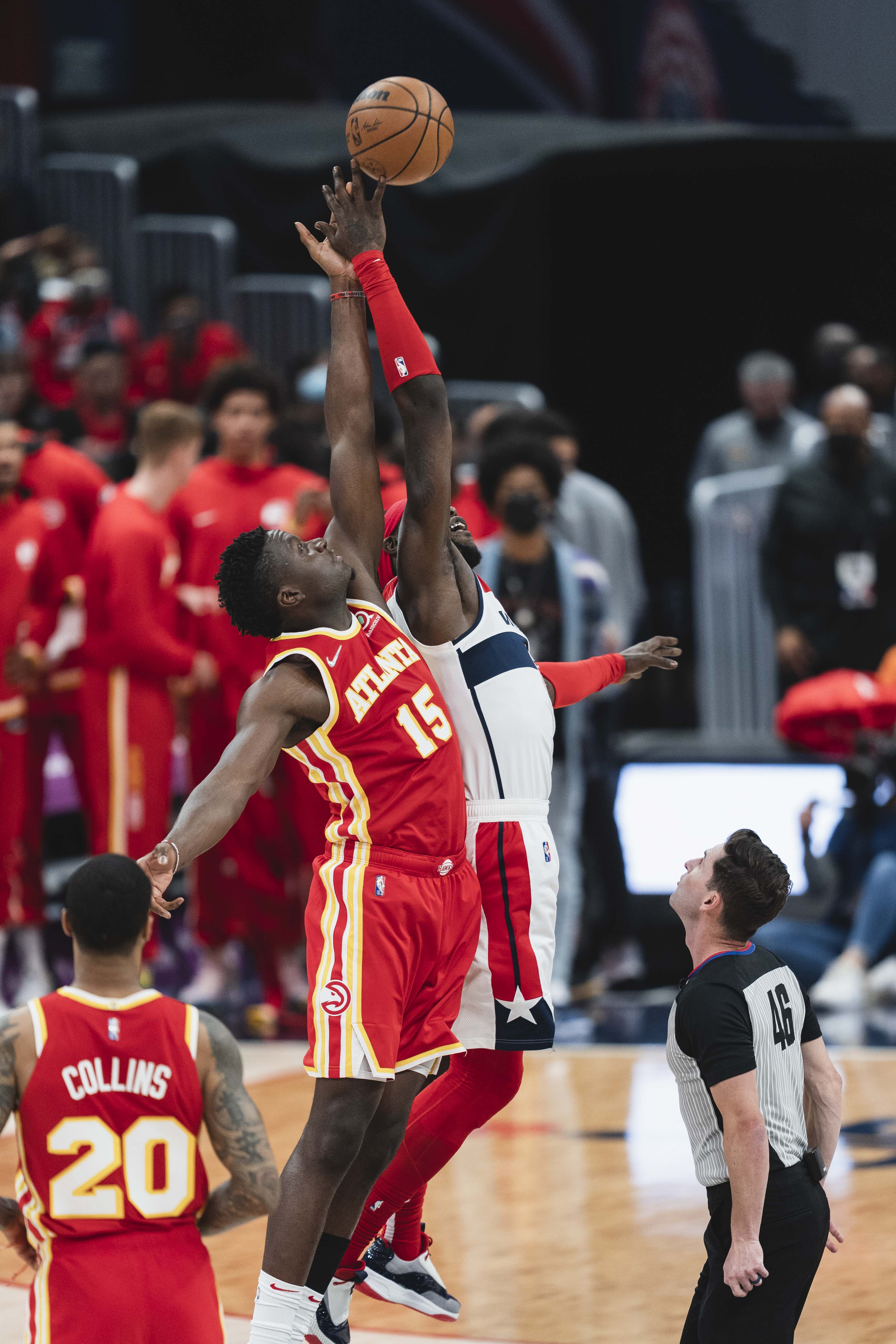
Clint Capela with the Atlanta Hawks in 2021

On February 5, 2020, Houston traded Capela and Nenê to the Atlanta Hawks and received Robert Covington and Jordan Bell in a four-team, 12-player trade.

On December 28, 2020, Capela made his Hawks debut, putting up seven points, nine rebounds and two blocks in a 128–120 win against the Detroit Pistons. On January 22, 2021, Capela recorded his first career triple-double with 13 points, 19 rebounds and a career-high 10 blocks in a 116–98 win over the Minnesota Timberwolves. During the 2021 NBA playoffs, Capela helped the Hawks reach the Conference Finals. On June 23, Capela scored 12 points, including the go-ahead score with 29.8 seconds left, and grabbed 19 rebounds during a 116–113 game 1 win over the Milwaukee Bucks. The Hawks would eventually lose the series in six games. Following the season, Capela signed a two-year, $46 million extension through the 2024–25 season.

On December 31, 2021, Capela grabbed a season-high 23 rebounds and scored 18 points during a 121–118 win over the Cleveland Cavaliers.

On April 11, 2023, during the Hawks' play-in tournament game against the Miami Heat, Capela grabbed 21 rebounds, alongside four points and two blocks, in a 116–105 win that secured the seventh seed in the playoffs for the Hawks.

=== Second stint with Rockets (2025–present) ===
On July 6, 2025, Capela signed a three-year, $21.5 million contract with the Houston Rockets as part of a sign-and-trade involving seven teams.

On April 12, 2026, in his 826th career game, Capela hit his first career three-pointer as part of a 132–102 victory over the Memphis Grizzlies.

== National team career ==
In August 2013, Capela debuted for the Swiss national basketball team at the FIBA EuroBasket 2015 qualification rounds.

== Career statistics ==
Legend
GP	Games played	GS	Games started	MPG	Minutes per game
FG%	Field-goal percentage	3P%	3-point field-goal percentage	FT%	Free-throw percentage
RPG	Rebounds per game	APG	Assists per game	SPG	Steals per game
BPG	Blocks per game	PPG	Points per game	PIR	Performance index rating
**Bold**	Career high

*	Led the league

=== NBA ===
==== Regular season ====
Year	Team	GP	GS	MPG	FG%	3P%	FT%	RPG	APG	SPG	BPG	PPG
2014–15	Houston	12	0	7.5	.483	—	.174	3.0	.2	.1	.8	2.7
2015–16	Houston	**77**	35	19.1	.582	.000	.379	6.4	.6	**.8**	1.2	7.0
2016–17	Houston	65	59	23.9	.643	—	.531	8.1	1.0	.5	1.2	12.6
2017–18	Houston	74	**74**	27.5	.652*	.000	.560	10.8	.9	**.8**	1.9	13.9
2018–19	Houston	67	67	**33.6**	.648	—	**.636**	12.7	**1.4**	.7	1.5	**16.6**
2019–20	Houston	39	39	32.8	.629	—	.529	13.8	1.2	**.8**	1.8	13.9
2020–21	Atlanta	63	63	30.1	.594	—	.573	**14.3***	.8	.7	**2.0**	15.2
2021–22	Atlanta	74	73	27.6	.613	.000	.473	11.9	1.2	.7	1.3	11.1
2022–23	Atlanta	65	63	26.6	**.653**	.000	.603	11.0	.9	.7	1.2	12.0
2023–24	Atlanta	73	73	25.8	.571	.000	.631	10.6	1.2	.6	1.5	11.5
2024–25	Atlanta	55	41	21.4	.559	.000	.536	8.5	1.1	.6	1.0	8.9
2025–26	Houston	75	3	12.3	.520	**.500**	.577	4.6	.7	.5	.8	3.8
Career		739	599	24.8	.613	.125	.546	9.9	1.0	.7	1.4	11.1

==== Playoffs ====
Year	Team	GP	GS	MPG	FG%	3P%	FT%	RPG	APG	SPG	BPG	PPG
2015	Houston	17	0	7.5	**.677**	—	.517	2.5	.3	.2	.5	3.4
2016	Houston	5	0	8.6	.333	—	.400	4.0	.4	.6	.4	1.6
2017	Houston	11	11	26.0	.561	.000	**.615**	8.7	1.1	.7	**2.5**	10.5
2018	Houston	17	17	30.6	.660	—	.473	**11.6**	1.3	.8	2.1	**12.7**
2019	Houston	11	11	30.1	.561	—	.429	10.3	**1.5**	.3	1.1	9.7
2021	Atlanta	**18**	**18**	**31.6**	.603	—	.436	11.2	.9	.7	1.1	10.1
2022	Atlanta	2	2	20.0	.333	—	—	7.5	.0	.5	.5	2.0
2023	Atlanta	6	6	25.2	.605	—	.667	8.3	.5	**1.0**	.5	8.3
2026	Houston	4	0	5.5	.375	—	—	1.8	.3	.0	.3	1.5
Career		91	65	23.0	.599	.000	.495	8.1	.9	.5	1.2	8.2

=== EuroLeague ===
Year	Team	GP	GS	MPG	FG%	3P%	FT%	RPG	APG	SPG	BPG	PPG	PIR
2012–13	Élan Chalon	7	0	8.0	.636	.000	1.000	3.0	.3	.4	.7	2.3	4.9
Career		7	0	8.0	.636	.000	1.000	3.0	.3	.4	.7	2.3	4.9

== See also ==
- List of NBA career field goal percentage leaders
