= New Orleans Pelicans draft history =

National Basketball Association team draft history

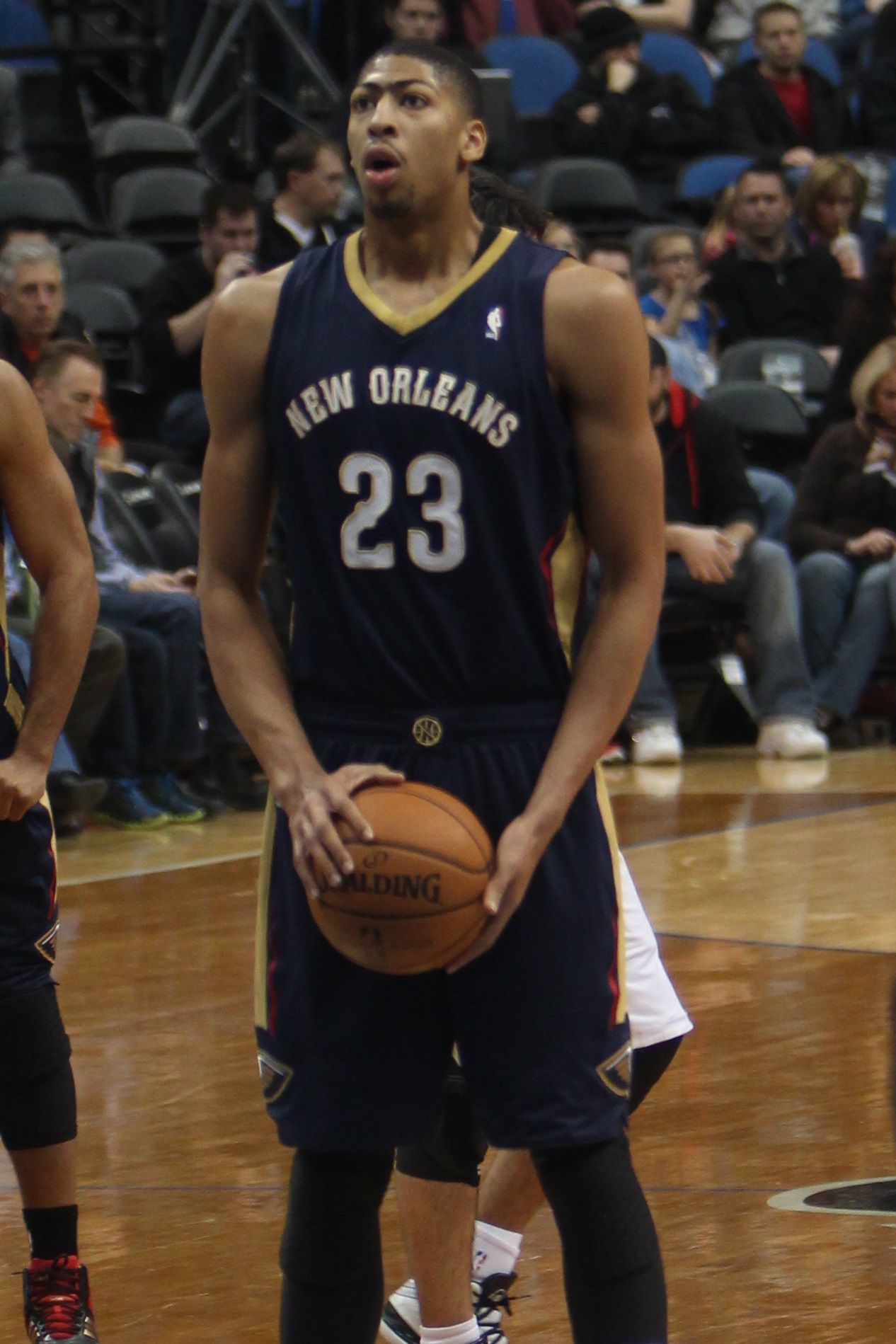
Anthony Davis was the Pelicans' first overall pick in 2012.

The New Orleans Pelicans are an American professional basketball team based in New Orleans, Louisiana. They play in the Southwest Division of the Western Conference of the National Basketball Association (NBA). The Pelicans were established as the New Orleans Hornets in the 2002–03 season when then-owner of the Charlotte Hornets, George Shinn, relocated the franchise to New Orleans. During the 2005–07 period, the Hornets played 71 games in Oklahoma City due to the damage caused by Hurricane Katrina. The team officially changed its name to the New Orleans Pelicans on April 18, 2013.

== Key ==
Abbreviation	Meaning	Abbreviation	Meaning
Nat	Nationality	Pos	Position
G	Guard	PG	Point guard
SG	Shooting guard	F	Forward
SF	Small forward	PF	Power forward
C	Center		

Naismith Basketball Hall of Famer	First overall NBA draft pick	Selected for an NBA All-Star Game

== Selections ==
Year	Round	Pick	Player	Nat	Pos	From
2003	1	18	David West	USA	PF	Xavier
2003	2	48	James Lang	USA	PF/C	Central Park Christian (H.S.)
2004	1	18	J. R. Smith	USA	SG	St. Benedict's (H.S.)
2004	2	44	Tim Pickett	USA	SG	Florida State
2005	1	4	Chris Paul	USA	PG	Wake Forest
2005	2	33	Brandon Bass	USA	PF	LSU
2006	1	12	Hilton Armstrong	USA	PF/C	Connecticut
2006	1	15	Cedric Simmons (from Milwaukee)^{[i]}	USA	PF	North Carolina State
2006	2	43	Marcus Vinicius	BRA	SF	Objetivo São Carlos (Brazil)
2007	1	13	Julian Wright	USA	SF	Kansas
2007	2	43	Adam Haluska	USA	SG	Iowa
2008	1	27	Darrell Arthur (traded to Memphis via Portland)^{[j]}	USA	PF	Kansas
2009	1	21	Darren Collison	USA	PG	UCLA
2010	1	11	Cole Aldrich (traded to Oklahoma City)	USA	C	Kansas
2011	2	45	Josh Harrellson (traded to New York)	USA	PF/C	Kentucky
2012	1	1	Anthony Davis	USA	PF/C	Kentucky
2012	1	10	Austin Rivers (from Minnesota via L.A. Clippers)	USA	PG	Duke
2012	2	46	Darius Miller (from Dallas via Washington)	USA	SF	Kentucky
2013	1	6	Nerlens Noel (traded to Philadelphia)	USA	PF/C	Kentucky
2015	2	56	Branden Dawson (from Memphis, traded to L.A. Clippers)	USA	SF	Michigan State
2016	1	6	Buddy Hield	BAH	SG	Oklahoma
2016	2	39	David Michineau (from Denver via Philadelphia, traded to L.A. Clippers)	FRA	PG	Élan Chalon (France)
2016	2	40	Diamond Stone (from Sacramento, traded to L.A. Clippers)	USA	PF/C	Maryland
2017	2	40	Dwayne Bacon (traded to Charlotte)	USA	SG	Florida State
2017	2	52	Edmond Sumner (from Washington. traded to Indiana)	USA	PG	Xavier
2018	2	51	Tony Carr (previously from Chicago via New Orleans, Miami, and New Orleans)	USA	PG	Penn State
2019	1	1	Zion Williamson	USA	PF	Duke
2019	2	39	Alen Smailagić (traded to Golden State)	SRB	C	Santa Cruz Warriors (NBA G League)
2019	2	57	Jordan Bone (from Denver via Milwaukee, traded to Detroit via Atlanta and Philadelphia)	USA	PG	Tennessee
2020	1	13	Kira Lewis Jr.	USA	PG	Alabama
2020	2	39	Elijah Hughes (from Washington via Milwaukee, traded to Utah)	USA	SF	Syracuse
2020	2	42	Nick Richards (traded to Charlotte)	JAM	C	Kentucky
2020	2	60	Sam Merrill (from Milwaukee, traded to Milwaukee)	USA	SG	Utah State
2021	1	10	Ziaire Williams (traded to Memphis)	USA	SF	Stanford
2022	1	8	Dyson Daniels (from L.A. Lakers)	AUS	PG/SG	G League Ignite (NBA G League)
2022	2	41	E.J. Liddell	USA	PF	Ohio State
2022	2	52	Karlo Matković (from Utah)	CRO	C	Mega Mozzart (Serbia)
2023	1	14	Jordan Hawkins	USA	SG	UConn
2024	1	21	Yves Missi (from Milwaukee)	CMR	C	Baylor

== Footnotes ==
- ^{h} On July 12, 2006, the Hornets traded the draft rights to Andrew Betts to the Indiana Pacers for Peja Stojaković and cash considerations.
- ^{i} On October 26, 2005, the Hornets traded Jamaal Magloire to the Milwaukee Bucks for Desmond Mason, a 2006 first-round pick (#15 overall pick), and cash considerations.
- ^{j} On June 27, 2008, the Hornets traded the draft rights to Darrell Arthur to Portland Trail Blazers for cash considerations.
