= Larry Nance Jr. =

American basketball player (born 1993)

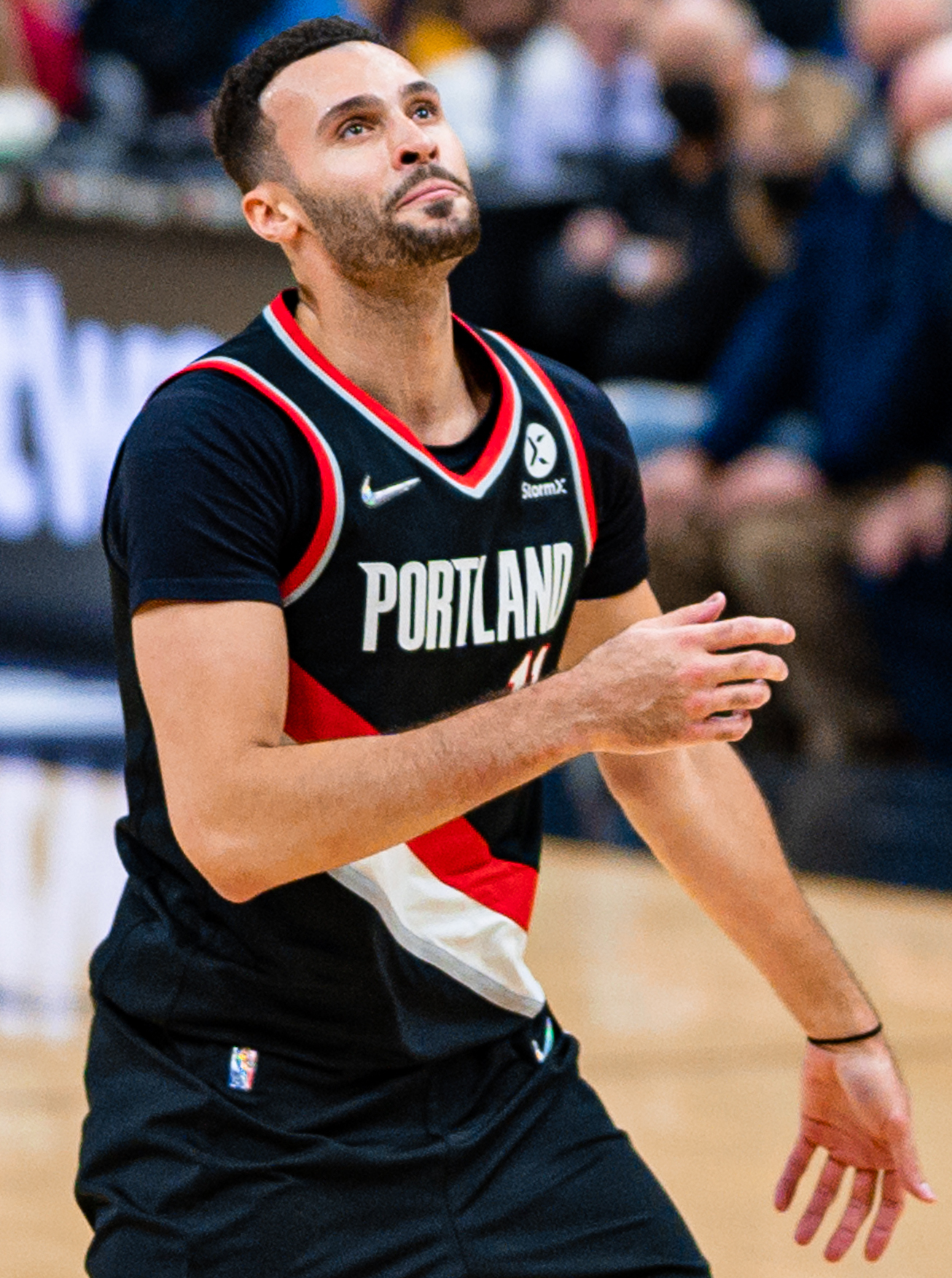
- Nance with the Portland Trail Blazers in 2021

No. 22 – Indiana Pacers
- Position: Power forward / center
- League: NBA

Personal information
- Born: January 1, 1993 (age 33) Akron, Ohio, U.S.
- Listed height: 6 ft 8 in (2.03 m)
- Listed weight: 245 lb (111 kg)

Career information
- High school: Revere (Richfield, Ohio)
- College: Wyoming (2011–2015)
- NBA draft: 2015: 1st round, 27th overall pick
- Drafted by: Los Angeles Lakers
- Playing career: 2015–present

Career history
- 2015–2018: Los Angeles Lakers
- 2018–2021: Cleveland Cavaliers
- 2021–2022: Portland Trail Blazers
- 2022–2024: New Orleans Pelicans
- 2024–2025: Atlanta Hawks
- 2025–2026: Cleveland Cavaliers
- 2026–present: Indiana Pacers

Career highlights
- 2× First-team All-MWC (2014, 2015); MWC Defensive Player of the Year (2015); 2× MWC All-Defensive Team (2014, 2015)
- Stats at NBA.com
- Stats at Basketball Reference

Larry Donnell Nance Jr. (born January 1, 1993) is an American professional basketball player for the Indiana Pacers of the National Basketball Association (NBA). Considered by many as one of the best big men ever to play in the Mountain West Conference, he played college basketball for the Wyoming Cowboys before being drafted 27th overall in the 2015 NBA draft by the Los Angeles Lakers. Nance has also played for the Cleveland Cavaliers, Portland Trail Blazers, New Orleans Pelicans, and Atlanta Hawks.

== High school and college career ==
Nance attended Revere High School near Akron, Ohio, growing to 6 ft 7 in (2.01 m) by his senior year after playing point guard for the freshman team standing at 5 ft 11 in (1.80 m). He averaged 18.2 points, 9.5 rebounds and 3.0 blocks per game as a senior for the Minutemen.

In his four-year college career at Wyoming, Nance averaged 11.3 points, 6.6 rebounds, 1.4 assists, 1.1 steals, and 1.1 blocks in 123 games.

== Professional career ==
=== Los Angeles Lakers (2015–2018) ===
==== 2015–16 season ====
On June 25, 2015, Nance was selected with the 27th overall pick in the 2015 NBA draft by the Los Angeles Lakers. Shortly after the draft selection was announced, an old tweet from 2012 by Nance resurfaced, in which he referenced then-teammate Kobe Bryant's infamous 2003 rape incident. Nance deleted the tweet shortly after, and Bryant spoke on the tweet, calling the controversy surrounding it "water under the bridge". On July 10, Nance signed his rookie scale contract with the Lakers. He made his NBA debut on November 6 against the Brooklyn Nets, recording six points and five rebounds in a 104–98 win. On December 7, he made his first start for the Lakers after replacing Julius Randle at the starting power forward spot against the Toronto Raptors. On December 27, he recorded his first career double-double with a season-high 17 points and 11 rebounds in a 112–96 loss to the Memphis Grizzlies. On January 1, 2016, Nance logged a season-high 14 rebounds, along with eight points, in a 93–84 win over the Philadelphia 76ers. He matched this total during his next game, which was two days later on January 3, along with fifteen points and a steal in a 97–77 loss to the Phoenix Suns. On January 14, Nance grabbed a season-high six steals in a 116–98 loss to the Golden State Warriors.

==== 2016–17 season ====
On October 26, 2016, Nance made his season debut for the Lakers, recording five points, five rebounds and two assists in a 120–114 win over the Houston Rockets. On November 1, he recorded a season-high six steals in a 108–115 loss to the Indiana Pacers. On November 20, he scored a career-high 18 points in a 118–110 loss to the Chicago Bulls. On December 25, Nance was ruled out for four weeks after suffering an injury to his left knee. He returned to action on January 22, 2017, where he logged four points and a rebound in a 73–122 blowout loss to the Dallas Mavericks. Nance matched his career-high of 18 points on February 3, where he also grabbed 11 rebounds and four assists in a 107–113 loss to the Boston Celtics. On April 2, he recorded a season-high 14 rebounds, along with 12 points and three steals, in a 108–103 win over the Memphis Grizzlies. On April 9, Nance logged a season-high six assists, along with ten points and ten rebounds, in a 110–109 win over the Minnesota Timberwolves.

==== 2017–18 season ====
On October 19, 2017, Nance made his season debut for the Lakers, where he recorded a double-double of 14 points and 12 rebounds in a 92–108 loss to the Los Angeles Clippers. On November 3, he was ruled out for four to six weeks after fracturing the second metacarpal on his left hand the previous night against the Portland Trail Blazers. He missed 11 games as a result. Nance returned to action on November 27, where he logged nine points, eight rebounds and four steals in a 115–120 loss to the Clippers. On November 29, he also dished out a season-high five assists in a 123–127 loss to the Golden State Warriors. On February 6, 2018, two days before he was traded, Nance played his last game as a Laker, where he recorded six points, ten rebounds and a steal in a 112–93 win over the Phoenix Suns.

=== Cleveland Cavaliers (2018–2021) ===
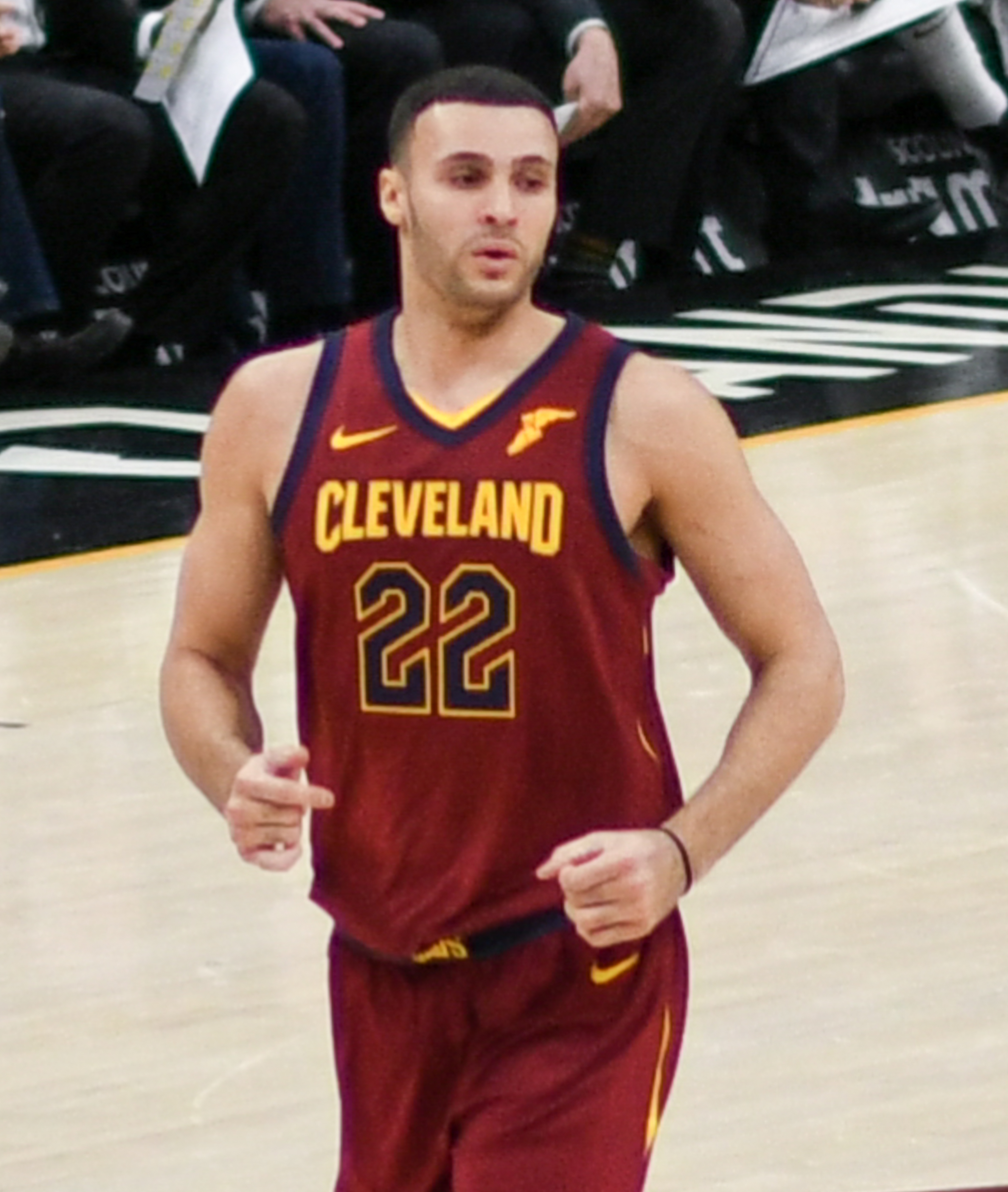
Nance in 2018

On February 8, 2018, Nance was traded, along with Jordan Clarkson, to his hometown team the Cleveland Cavaliers in exchange for Isaiah Thomas, Channing Frye and a 2018 first-round draft pick. After playing his first two games as a Cavalier with No. 24, he switched to No. 22 permanently on February 22 after the NBA allowed him to wear his father's retired No. 22 jersey. On March 5, 2018, he posted career highs with 22 points and 15 rebounds in his first start for Cleveland, as the Cavaliers defeated the Detroit Pistons 112–90. On March 13, 2018, in a 129–107 win over the Phoenix Suns, Nance had only four points, ending his career-best string of seven consecutive double-digit scoring games. Nance helped the Cavaliers reach the NBA Finals in 2018, where they lost 4–0 to the Golden State Warriors.

On October 15, 2018, Nance signed a four-year, $44.8 million contract extension with the Cavaliers. On December 18, 2018, he had 15 points, a career-high 16 rebounds, six assists and the first game-winning shot of his pro career to give the Cavaliers a 92–91 win over the Indiana Pacers. On January 8, 2019, against the Pacers, he suffered a right knee MCL sprain. He subsequently missed eight games. On February 8, he recorded a career-high 19 rebounds in a 119–106 loss to the Washington Wizards.

On February 12, 2020, Nance scored a career-high 23 points, alongside twelve rebounds, two assists, three steals and two blocks, in a 127–105 win over the Atlanta Hawks. On February 26, he grabbed a season-high 15 rebounds, alongside 13 points and three assists, in a 108–94 win over the Philadelphia 76ers. On March 4, Nance grabbed 15 rebounds, alongside 19 points, four assists and four steals, in a 112–106 loss to the Boston Celtics. During the 2019–20 season, Nance averaged a career-high 10.1 points per game.

On January 7, 2021, Nance scored a season-high 18 points, alongside three rebounds, four assists and three steals, in a 94–90 win over the Memphis Grizzlies. On January 31, he grabbed a season-high 16 rebounds, alongside two points and four assists, in a 109–104 loss to the Minnesota Timberwolves. On March 17, Nance scored 18 points, alongside ten rebounds, four assists and two steals in a 117–110 win over the Boston Celtics.

=== Portland Trail Blazers (2021–2022) ===
On August 28, 2021, Nance was acquired by the Portland Trail Blazers in a three-team sign-and-trade involving the Chicago Bulls. He made his Trail Blazers debut on October 20, recording two points, three rebounds and two assists in a 124–121 loss to the Sacramento Kings.

=== New Orleans Pelicans (2022–2024) ===
On February 8, 2022, Portland traded Nance, CJ McCollum, and Tony Snell to the New Orleans Pelicans in exchange for Josh Hart, Nickeil Alexander-Walker, Tomáš Satoranský, Didi Louzada, a protected 2022 first-round draft pick, the better of New Orleans' and Portland's 2026 second-round draft picks and New Orleans' 2027 second-round draft pick. Three days later, Nance underwent arthroscopic right knee surgery.

On October 1, 2022, Nance signed a two-year, $21.6 million contract extension with the Pelicans.

=== Atlanta Hawks (2024–2025) ===
On July 6, 2024, Nance, E. J. Liddell, Dyson Daniels, Cody Zeller (via sign-and-trade), a 2025 first-round pick (via Lakers), and a conditional 2027 first-round pick were traded to the Atlanta Hawks in exchange for Dejounte Murray. In 24 appearances (3 starts) for Atlanta during the 2024–25 NBA season, he averaged 8.5 points, 4.3 rebounds, and 1.6 assists. On March 26, 2025, Nance was ruled out for the remainder of the season due to a lingering right medial femoral condyle fracture.

=== Return to Cleveland (2025–2026) ===
On July 6, 2025, Nance signed with the Cleveland Cavaliers on a minimum deal. Nance made 35 appearances (including three starts) for the Cavaliers during the 2025–26 NBA season, recording averages of 3.7 points, 2.7 rebounds, and 1.0 assist.

=== Indiana Pacers (2026–present) ===
On July 9, 2026, Nance signed a one-year, $3.88 million contract with the Indiana Pacers.

== Career statistics ==
Legend
GP	Games played	GS	Games started	MPG	Minutes per game
FG%	Field goal percentage	3P%	3-point field goal percentage	FT%	Free throw percentage
RPG	Rebounds per game	APG	Assists per game	SPG	Steals per game
BPG	Blocks per game	PPG	Points per game	**Bold**	Career high

=== NBA ===
==== Regular season ====
Year	Team	GP	GS	MPG	FG%	3P%	FT%	RPG	APG	SPG	BPG	PPG
2015–16	L.A. Lakers	63	22	20.1	.527	.100	.681	5.0	.7	.9	.4	5.5
2016–17	L.A. Lakers	63	7	22.9	.526	.278	.738	5.9	1.5	1.3	.6	7.1
2017–18	L.A. Lakers	42	17	21.9	.601	.250	.632	6.8	1.4	1.4	.5	8.6
2017–18	Cleveland	24	9	20.8	.550	.125	.720	7.0	1.0	1.2	**.8**	8.9
2018–19	Cleveland	**67**	**30**	26.8	.520	.337	.716	**8.2**	**3.2**	1.5	.6	9.4
2019–20	Cleveland	56	10	26.3	.531	.352	.676	7.3	2.2	1.0	.4	**10.1**
2020–21	Cleveland	35	27	**31.2**	.471	.360	.612	6.7	3.1	**1.7**	.5	9.3
2021–22	Portland	37	11	23.2	.515	.306	.653	5.6	2.0	1.0	.4	6.9
2021–22	New Orleans	9	0	20.2	.551	**.500**	**1.000**	4.3	.9	.6	**.8**	7.3
2022–23	New Orleans	65	1	21.2	**.610**	.333	.696	5.4	1.8	.9	.6	6.8
2023–24	New Orleans	61	0	19.9	.573	.415	.770	5.0	1.9	1.0	.3	5.7
2024–25	Atlanta	24	3	19.3	.516	.447	.692	4.3	1.6	.8	.5	8.5
2025–26	Cleveland	35	3	12.8	.419	.333	.462	2.7	1.0	.6	.2	3.7
Career		581	140	22.4	.535	.352	.692	5.9	1.8	1.1	.5	7.5

==== Playoffs ====
Year	Team	GP	GS	MPG	FG%	3P%	FT%	RPG	APG	SPG	BPG	PPG
2018	Cleveland	**20**	0	15.4	**.683**	.000	.452	4.5	.9	**.8**	**.7**	4.8
2022	New Orleans	6	0	**21.6**	.564	.222	**.818**	5.8	**1.8**	.5	.3	**9.2**
2024	New Orleans	4	0	21.1	.588	**.250**	.667	**8.3**	**1.8**	.5	.0	6.3
2026	Cleveland	2	0	2.5	—	—	—	.0	.0	.0	.0	.0
Career		32	0	16.4	.629	.214	.563	4.9	1.1	.7	.5	5.5

=== College ===
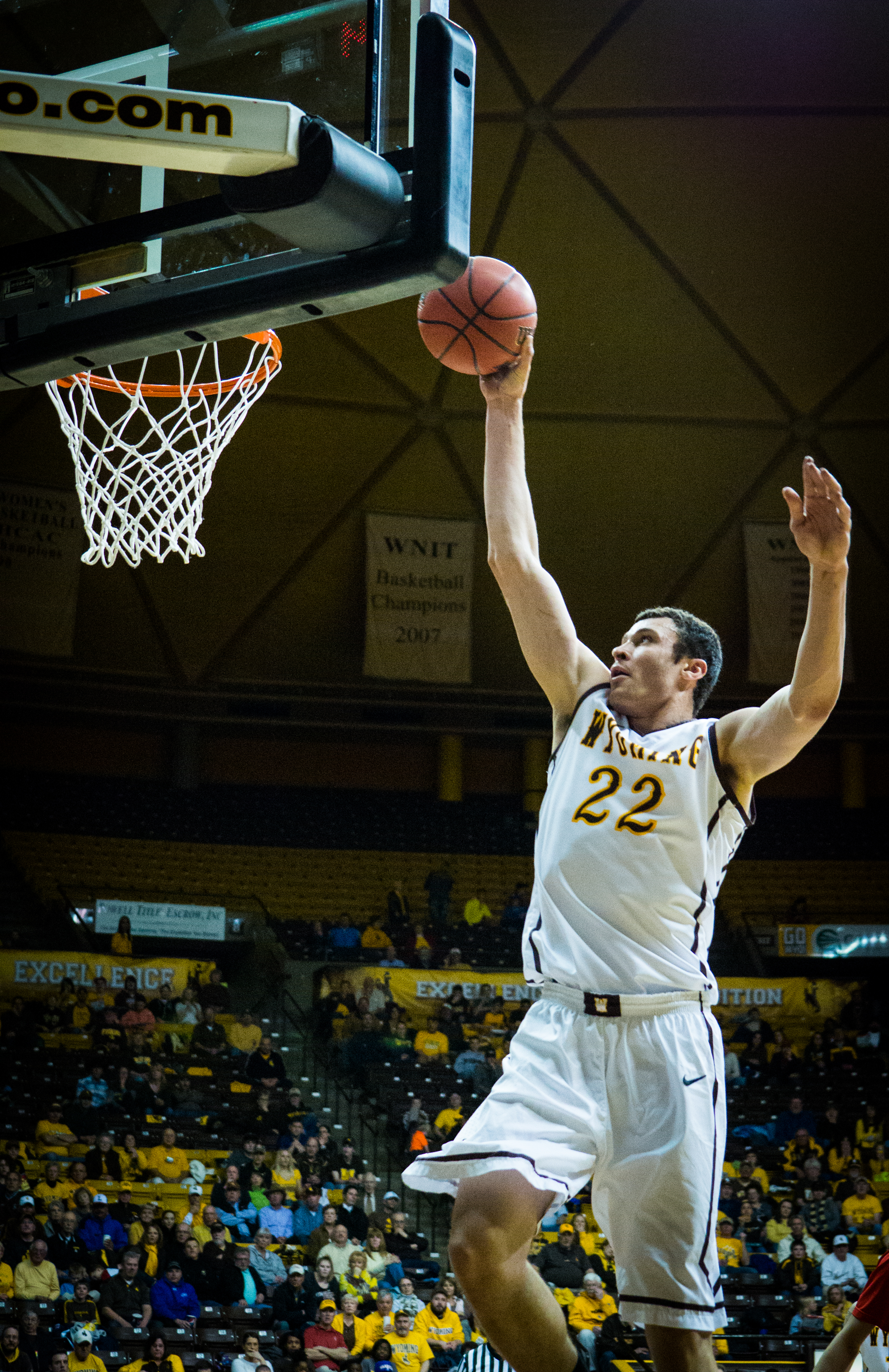
Nance going up for a dunk in 2014

Year	Team	GP	GS	MPG	FG%	3P%	FT%	RPG	APG	SPG	BPG	PPG
2011–12	Wyoming	**33**	0	17.9	.462	.333	**.814**	4.0	.4	.8	.6	4.1
2012–13	Wyoming	**33**	**33**	32.0	.533	**.345**	.750	6.9	1.2	1.3	.7	10.7
2013–14	Wyoming	26	26	34.7	**.544**	.243	.758	**8.6**	1.6	**1.4**	**2.1**	15.4
2014–15	Wyoming	31	31	**34.9**	.514	.333	.786	7.2	**2.5**	1.2	1.2	**16.1**
Career		123	90	29.5	.521	.308	.771	6.6	1.4	1.1	1.1	11.3

== Personal life ==
Nance is the son of Larry Nance, Sr., a former professional basketball player for the Cleveland Cavaliers and Phoenix Suns. Nance Sr. was a three-time NBA All-Star and won the league's first Slam Dunk Contest. Nance Jr. was a participant in the 2018 Slam Dunk Contest, coming in second. One of the younger Nance's dunks was a tribute to his father, as he wore a retro 1984 Phoenix Suns uniform and performed a cradle dunk as his father had done that year to win the inaugural dunk contest. Larry Sr. and Jr. later teamed up for an alley-oop dunk, with the elder Nance throwing the ball up to his son, who slammed it through the hoop.

At the age of 16, Nance Jr. was diagnosed with Crohn's disease.

Nance Jr.'s older sister, Casey, played basketball at Revere High School and for the NCAA Division I Dayton Flyers for four years. Nance Jr.'s younger brother, Pete also played basketball at Revere High School, and spent his college playing basketball at Northwestern. In June 2022, Pete Nance decided to transfer to the North Carolina Tar Heels men's basketball program with his extra year of Covid eligibility.

Outside of the NBA, Nance supports the soccer club Leeds United F.C. and became part owner in 2023 as a member of the 49ers Enterprises, the investment arm of the San Francisco 49ers.

In 2018, Nance Jr. married his longtime girlfriend, Hailey Pince.

== See also ==
- List of second-generation NBA players
