= Dejounte Murray =

American basketball player (born 1996)

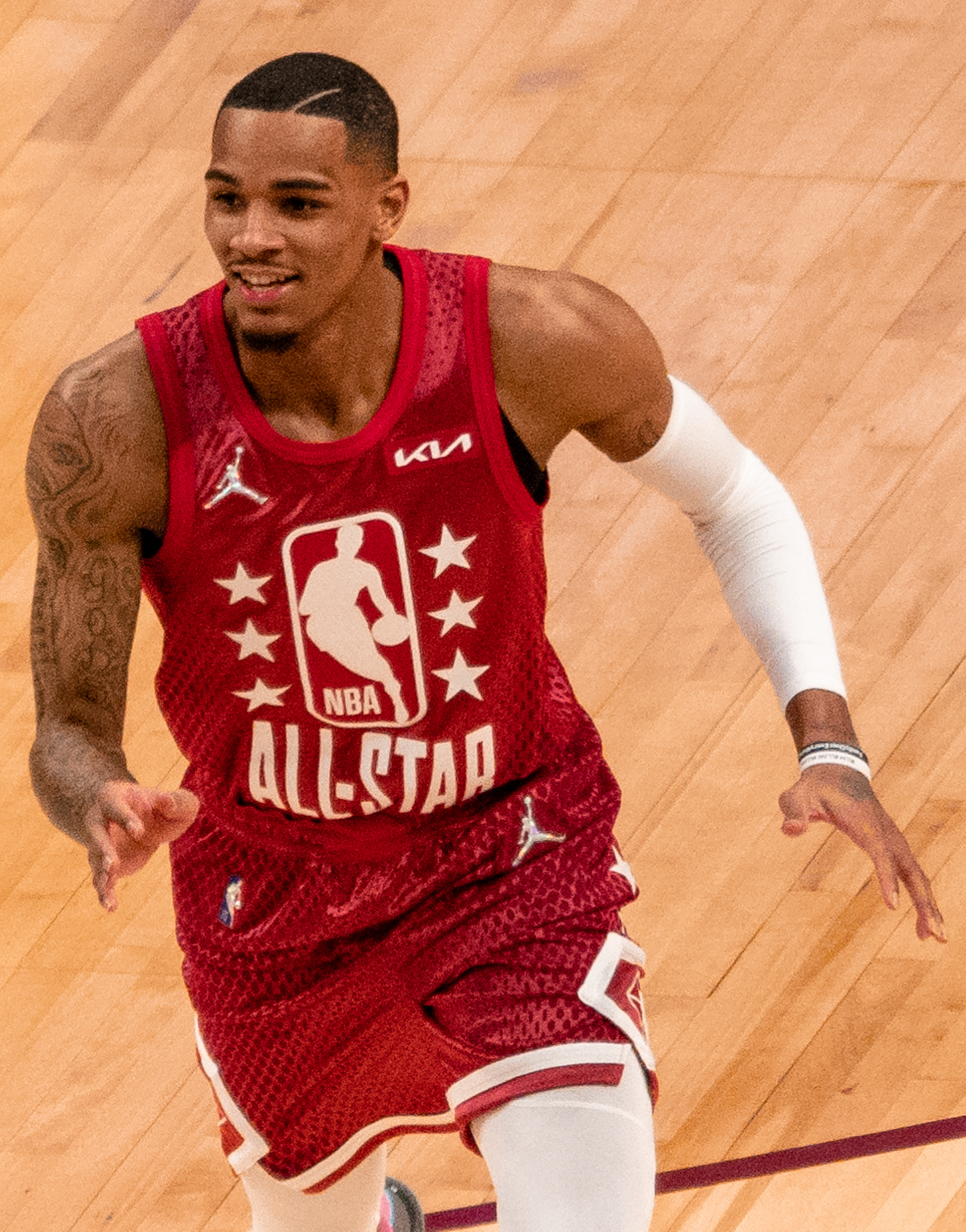
- Murray at the 2022 NBA All-Star Game

No. 5 – New Orleans Pelicans
- Position: Point guard
- League: NBA

Personal information
- Born: September 19, 1996 (age 30) Seattle, Washington, U.S.
- Listed height: 6 ft 4 in (1.93 m)
- Listed weight: 188 lb (85 kg)

Career information
- High school: Rainier Beach (Seattle, Washington)
- College: Washington (2015–2016)
- NBA draft: 2016: 1st round, 29th overall pick
- Drafted by: San Antonio Spurs
- Playing career: 2016–present

Career history
- 2016–2022: San Antonio Spurs
- 2022–2024: Atlanta Hawks
- 2024–present: New Orleans Pelicans

Career highlights
- NBA All-Star (2022); NBA All-Defensive Second Team (2018); NBA steals leader (2022); Second-team All-Pac-12 (2016); First-team Parade All-American (2015); Washington Mr. Basketball (2015)
- Stats at NBA.com
- Stats at Basketball Reference

Dejounte Dashaun Murray (/dəˈdʒɒnteɪ/ də-JHOHN-tay; born September 19, 1996) is an American professional basketball player for the New Orleans Pelicans of the National Basketball Association (NBA). He played one season of college basketball for the Washington Huskies, where he earned second-team all-conference honors in the Pac-12 as a freshman in 2015–16. He was selected by the San Antonio Spurs in the first round of the 2016 NBA draft with the 29th overall pick. In 2022, Murray was named to his first NBA All-Star Game and led the league in steals. He is the Spurs' franchise leader in career triple-doubles. He has also played for the Atlanta Hawks.

== Early life ==
Murray grew up in the impoverished South End area of Seattle, Washington. Throughout his upbringing, he was exposed to gun and drug violence, homelessness, and parental incarceration. Prior to high school, Murray spent time in juvenile detention.

== High school career ==
Murray attended Rainier Beach High School in Seattle, Washington. The school is a basketball powerhouse, having produced such NBA talents as Jamal Crawford, Doug Christie, Terrence Williams, Nate Robinson, and Kevin Porter Jr. Crawford encouraged Murray to take basketball seriously. Murray led the Vikings to three Class 3A state championships titles.

Among other honors that he received, Murray was named Washington Mr. Basketball by the Washington Interscholastic Basketball Coaches Association as well as The Seattle Times State Player of the Year.

== College career ==
As a freshman at the University of Washington in 2015–16, Murray was named second-team All-Pac-12 and Pac-12 All-Freshman Team after averaging 16.1 points, 5.9 rebounds, 4.4 assists and 1.8 steals in 33.5 minutes while starting all 34 games.

On March 23, 2016, Murray declared for the NBA draft, forgoing his final three years of college eligibility.

== Professional career ==
=== San Antonio Spurs (2016–2022) ===
On June 23, 2016, Murray was selected by the San Antonio Spurs with the 29th overall pick in the 2016 NBA draft. He joined the Spurs for the 2016 NBA Summer League, and on July 14, he signed his rookie-scale contract with the team. On October 29, 2016, in the Spurs' third game of the 2016–17 season, Murray made his NBA debut. In just under nine minutes off the bench, he recorded two rebounds and one assist in a 98–79 win over the New Orleans Pelicans. On January 12, 2017, he scored a season-high 10 points in a 134–94 win over the Los Angeles Lakers. He surpassed that on January 19, scoring 24 points in a 118–104 win over the Denver Nuggets. During his rookie season, he had multiple assignments with the Austin Spurs of the NBA Development League.

On May 5, 2017, with Tony Parker out for the rest of the playoffs with a leg injury, the Spurs started Murray at point guard in Game 3 of their second-round series against the Houston Rockets. He scored two points in 15 minutes, as the Spurs took a 2–1 lead in the series with a 103–92 win. He helped the Spurs clinch the series against the Rockets with 11 points, 10 rebounds, and five assists in a Game 6 win. He became just the fourth rookie in Spurs history to record a point/rebound double-double in a playoff game, joining David Robinson, Tim Duncan, and Kawhi Leonard. The Spurs went on to lose to the Golden State Warriors in the Western Conference Finals.

In the Spurs' season opener on October 18, 2017, Murray had 16 points, five rebounds, and two assists while starting in place of Parker in a 107–99 win over the Minnesota Timberwolves. On December 9, 2017, he tied his career high with 14 rebounds in a 104–101 win over the Phoenix Suns. On February 3, 2018, in a 120–111 loss to the Utah Jazz, Murray became the first player since Kawhi Leonard with 500 points and 300 rebounds in his first 100 games with the Spurs. On March 19, 2018, in an 89–75 win over the Warriors, Murray had eight rebounds to set the franchise record for rebounds in a season by a point guard. Murray reached 385 rebounds in 1,436 minutes, surpassing Johnny Moore's 378 in 2,689 minutes. In Game 4 of the Spurs' first-round playoff series against the Warriors, Murray was 3-for-3 on three-pointers in the first half, the most three-pointers made in the playoffs without a miss by a Spurs player since Steve Kerr (2003) and Patty Mills (2014) were 4-for-4 in a half. At the season's end, he earned NBA All-Defensive Second Team honors, becoming the then-youngest player in NBA history to be named All-Defense, which would be broken by another Spur, Victor Wembanyama, in 2024.

On October 7, 2018, Murray suffered a torn right anterior cruciate ligament injury in a preseason game against the Rockets. He missed the entire 2018–19 season.

In October 2019, the Spurs and Murray agreed to a four-year, $64 million contract, taking the contract to $70 million with incentives.

On December 26, 2020, Murray recorded his first career triple-double with 11 points, 10 rebounds, and 10 assists in the Spurs' 119–114 win against the Toronto Raptors. On February 8, 2021, he recorded 27 points, 10 rebounds, and a career-high eight steals in the Spurs' 105–100 win against the Warriors.

On February 7, 2022, Murray was named to his first NBA All-Star team as an injury replacement for Draymond Green. On February 13, in a 124–114 win over the Pelicans, Murray became the first player in NBA history to record at least 30 points, 10 rebounds, and no more than one turnover in consecutive games since individual turnovers were first tracked in 1977–78. He finished second, behind Ja Morant, in voting for the Most Improved Player award.

=== Atlanta Hawks (2022–2024) ===
On June 30, 2022, Murray was traded with Jock Landale to the Atlanta Hawks for Danilo Gallinari and multiple future first-round picks. On October 19, Murray made his Hawks debut, putting up 20 points, 11 assists, five rebounds, and five steals in a 117–107 win over the Houston Rockets. On November 2, Murray recorded a then-career-high 36 points, along with four rebounds, nine assists, and six steals in a 112–99 win against the New York Knicks. On November 5, Murray recorded his first career triple-double with the Hawks, putting up 22 points, 10 rebounds, 11 assists, and three steals in a 124–121 overtime win against the New Orleans Pelicans. On November 25, Murray recorded a then-career-high 39 points on eight three-pointers made in a 122–128 loss against the Houston Rockets.

On January 20, 2023, Murray led the Hawks to a 129–124 win over the New York Knicks with 29 points and a season-high 12 assists. On January 30, Murray scored a then career-high 40 points, along with eight rebounds, seven assists, two steals, and zero turnovers in a 129–125 loss against the Portland Trail Blazers. On March 3, Murray scored a then career-high 41 points on 17-of-22 shooting, 5-of-5 from three, and 2-of-2 from the free throw line in a 129–111 win over the Portland Trail Blazers. In Game 3 of the Hawks' first round playoff series against the Boston Celtics, Murray put up 25 points, six rebounds, five assists, and one steal in a 130–122 win. He joined Trae Young as the first pair of Hawks teammates to each put up at least 25 points, five rebounds, and five assists in a playoff game since Lenny Wilkens and Bill Bridges in 1966. On July 9, 2023, Murray signed a four-year, $120 million extension through 2027–28.

On October 30, 2023, Murray tied his then career-high 41 points while also putting up seven rebounds, five assists, and two steals in a 127–113 win over the Minnesota Timberwolves. On November 9, Murray made a game-winning three-pointer in a 116–115 win over the Orlando Magic.

On January 17, 2024, Murray put up 26 points, five assists, five rebounds, and a buzzer-beating, game-winning shot in a 106–104 win over the Orlando Magic. On January 19, in the Hawks’ next game, Murray had 22 points, 11 assists, and another game-winning shot in a 109–108 win over the Miami Heat. On March 28, Murray scored a career-high 44 points, including a game-winning mid-range jumpshot in a 123–122 overtime win over the Boston Celtics.

=== New Orleans Pelicans (2024–present) ===
On July 6, 2024, Murray was traded to the New Orleans Pelicans in exchange for Dyson Daniels, E.J. Liddell, Larry Nance Jr., Cody Zeller (via sign-and-trade), and two future first-round draft picks. He made 31 starts for the Pelicans during the 2024–25 NBA season, averaging 17.5 points, 6.5 rebounds, and 7.4 assists. On January 31, 2025, Murray sustained a non-contact leg injury in the first quarter against the Boston Celtics and was helped to the locker room before it would be revealed to be a torn right Achilles tendon, putting an abrupt end to his season.

On February 24, 2026, Murray made his return from injury, putting up 13 points, three assists, and two rebounds in a 113–109 win over the Golden State Warriors. On March 13, Murray compiled 35 points, seven rebounds, four assists, and one steal in a 105–107 loss to the Houston Rockets.

After a 4-8 start to the 2026–27 NBA season, Murray publicly criticized the Pelicans on X before the posts were deleted and called his time with the team "my worst experience in the NBA". On November 13, 2026, the Pelicans announced that Murray had requested a trade and both sides would work together to find a resolution.

== Career statistics ==
Legend
GP	Games played	GS	Games started	MPG	Minutes per game
FG%	Field goal percentage	3P%	3-point field goal percentage	FT%	Free throw percentage
RPG	Rebounds per game	APG	Assists per game	SPG	Steals per game
BPG	Blocks per game	PPG	Points per game	**Bold**	Career high
*	Led the league

=== NBA ===
==== Regular season ====
Year	Team	GP	GS	MPG	FG%	3P%	FT%	RPG	APG	SPG	BPG	PPG
2016–17	San Antonio	38	8	8.5	.431	**.391**	.700	1.1	1.3	.2	.2	3.4
2017–18	San Antonio	**81**	48	21.5	.443	.265	.709	5.7	2.9	1.2	**.4**	8.1
2019–20	San Antonio	66	58	25.6	.462	.369	.798	5.8	4.1	1.7	.3	10.9
2020–21	San Antonio	67	67	31.9	.453	.317	.791	7.1	5.4	1.5	.1	15.7
2021–22	San Antonio	68	68	34.8	.462	.327	.794	**8.3**	**9.2**	**2.0***	.3	21.1
2022–23	Atlanta	74	74	**36.4**	.464	.344	.832	5.3	6.1	1.5	.3	20.5
2023–24	Atlanta	78	**78**	35.7	.459	.363	.794	5.3	6.4	1.4	.3	**22.5**
2024–25	New Orleans	31	31	32.6	.393	.299	.823	6.5	7.4	**2.0**	**.4**	17.5
2025–26	New Orleans	14	14	27.8	**.484**	.306	**.867**	5.4	6.4	1.6	.2	16.7
Career		517	446	29.3	.454	.339	.793	5.8	5.4	1.5	.3	15.5
All-Star		1	0	27.0	.636	.333	1.000	5.0	5.0	.0	1.0	17.0

==== Playoffs ====
Year	Team	GP	GS	MPG	FG%	3P%	FT%	RPG	APG	SPG	BPG	PPG
2017	San Antonio	**11**	2	15.3	.377	.000	.680	2.5	2.5	1.5	.1	5.7
2018	San Antonio	5	**5**	19.2	**.452**	**.667**	.778	4.2	1.8	1.0	**.4**	7.8
2023	Atlanta	5	**5**	**38.1**	.447	.378	**1.000**	**7.2**	**6.8**	**2.0**	.2	**23.0**
Career		21	12	21.6	.426	.391	.767	4.0	3.3	1.5	.2	10.3

=== College ===
Year	Team	GP	GS	MPG	FG%	3P%	FT%	RPG	APG	SPG	BPG	PPG
2015–16	Washington	34	34	33.5	.416	.288	.663	6.0	4.4	1.8	.3	16.1

== Personal life ==
Murray has two daughters: Riley (born in 2019) and Icelynn (born in 2023).
