= Cody Zeller =

American basketball player (born 1992)

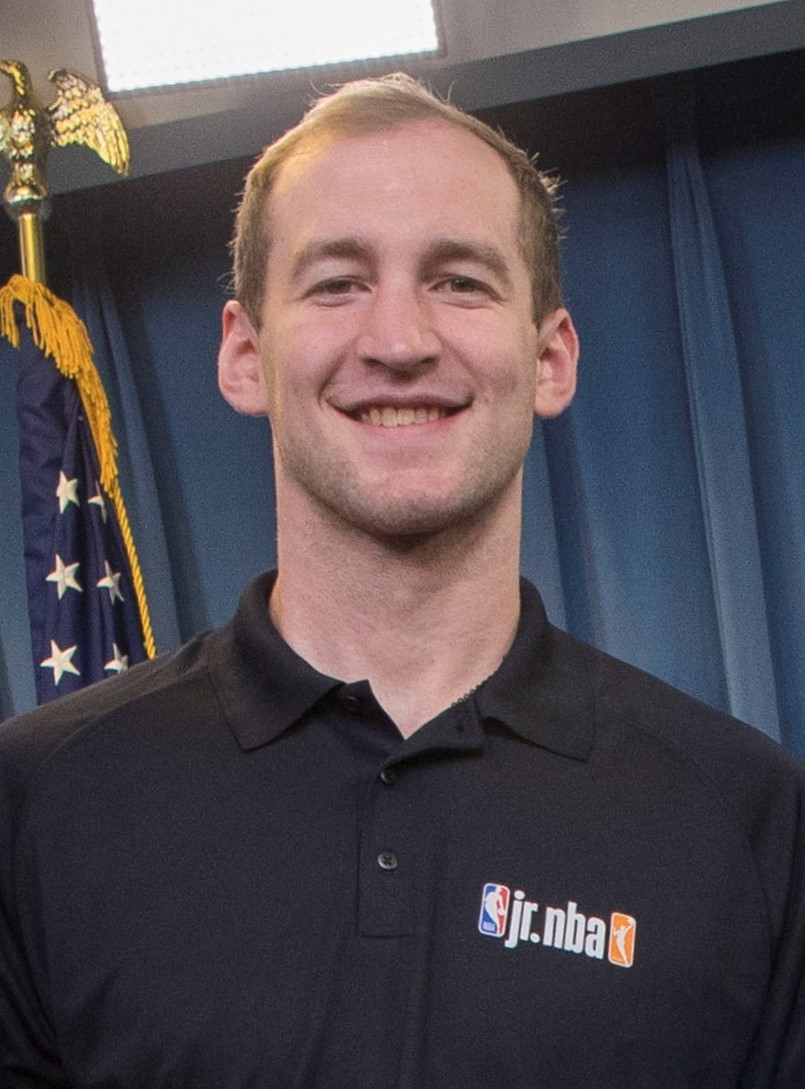
- Zeller in 2019

Personal information
- Born: October 5, 1992 (age 34) Washington, Indiana, U.S.
- Listed height: 6 ft 11 in (2.11 m)
- Listed weight: 240 lb (109 kg)

Career information
- High school: Washington (Washington, Indiana)
- College: Indiana (2011–2013)
- NBA draft: 2013: 1st round, 4th overall pick
- Drafted by: Charlotte Bobcats
- Playing career: 2013–2025
- Position: Center
- Number: 40, 44

Career history
- 2013–2021: Charlotte Bobcats / Hornets
- 2021–2022: Portland Trail Blazers
- 2023: Miami Heat
- 2023–2024: New Orleans Pelicans

Career highlights
- NBA All-Rookie Second Team (2014); Consensus second-team All-American (2013); First-team All-Big Ten (2013); Second-team All-Big Ten (2012); Big Ten Freshman of the Year (2012); Big Ten All-Freshman team (2012); McDonald's All-American (2011); Second-team Parade All-American (2011); Indiana Mr. Basketball (2011)
- Stats at NBA.com
- Stats at Basketball Reference

Cody Allen Zeller (born October 5, 1992) is an American former professional basketball player. He played high school basketball at Washington High School in Washington, Indiana, where he was named Indiana Mr. Basketball as a senior in 2011.

Zeller played two seasons of college basketball for the Indiana Hoosiers from 2011 to 2013. During his freshman season, he was named Big Ten Freshman of the Year and part of the All-Big Ten second team. In his sophomore season, he was named as a second-team All-American and part of the All-Big Ten first team.

Zeller was selected fourth overall in the 2013 NBA draft by the Charlotte Bobcats, who rebranded to the Hornets a year later. As a rookie, he was named to the NBA All-Rookie Second Team. Following eight seasons with the Hornets, he signed with the Portland Trail Blazers in August 2021, whom he spent one season with. Zeller joined the Miami Heat in February 2023, with whom he reached the 2023 NBA Finals. He then signed with the New Orleans Pelicans in July 2023.

== High school career ==
Following the end of his senior season, Zeller was named Indiana Mr. Basketball, the state's highest honor for high school players and an award both of his elder brothers also won. Zeller became the 26th Mr. Basketball from the state of Indiana to play for the Hoosiers. Other honors Zeller won in his high school career include first-team All-State honors from the Indiana Basketball Coaches Association, the Gatorade Player of the Year accolades in Indiana, and a second-team Parade All-American. According to ESPN Zeller was the 13th best overall recruit in 2011. Scout.com had him rated 12th nationally and third at his position, while Rivals.com had him slotted 15th in the country and fourth at his position.

== College career ==
On November 12, 2010, Zeller committed to play for Indiana University, turning down offers from North Carolina and Butler. Upon his commitment he was labeled "the savior of Indiana basketball." Zeller was nicknamed "The Big Handsome" during his time at IU.

=== Freshman season ===
In Zeller's first year as a Hoosier during the 2011–12 season he led the team with 15.6 points and 6.6 rebounds per game while shooting 62.3 percent (200-of-321) from the field and 75.5 percent (163-of-216) from the free-throw line. He ranked fourth in the country in field goal percentage, led the Big Ten Conference and posted the second-highest percentage in school history. His offensive rating of 126.8 ranked him 14th nationwide. Zeller was the Big Ten's Freshman of the Year, as voted on by the coaches, after earning Big Ten Freshman of the Week seven times. He was also Second Team All-Big Ten and a First Team Freshman All-American. He was a finalist for the Wayman Tisdale Award (USBWA National Freshman of the Year) and was a candidate for the John Wooden Award and Oscar Robertson Trophy.

=== Sophomore season ===
Although projected to be a top ten pick in the 2012 NBA draft, Zeller decided to return for his sophomore season at Indiana, along with teammate Christian Watford. In a statement issued by the Indiana Athletic Department, he said, "I grew up hoping that one day I would get the opportunity to play in the NBA, but at this point, I'm not ready for my college experience to be over...My college experience at IU this year has exceeded my expectations, on and off the court."

Due in part to Zeller's leadership, the Indiana Hoosiers finished the 2012–13 season as the outright Big Ten champions. He finished the regular season as the conference's third-highest scorer (16.8 points) and second highest rebounder (8.2), along with second in the league in shooting at 57% while only trailing teammate Victor Oladipo in the Big Ten.

Zeller accumulated numerous post-season awards. He was named a 2013 All-American by the USBWA (2nd Team) and Sporting News (3rd Team). He was also named First Team All-Big Ten by both the coaches and media, as well as a First Team Academic All-American.

At the end of his sophomore season, Zeller decided to enter the 2013 NBA draft, along with teammate Victor Oladipo.

== Professional career ==
=== Charlotte Bobcats / Hornets (2013–2021) ===
==== 2013–16: All-Rookie honors and later years ====
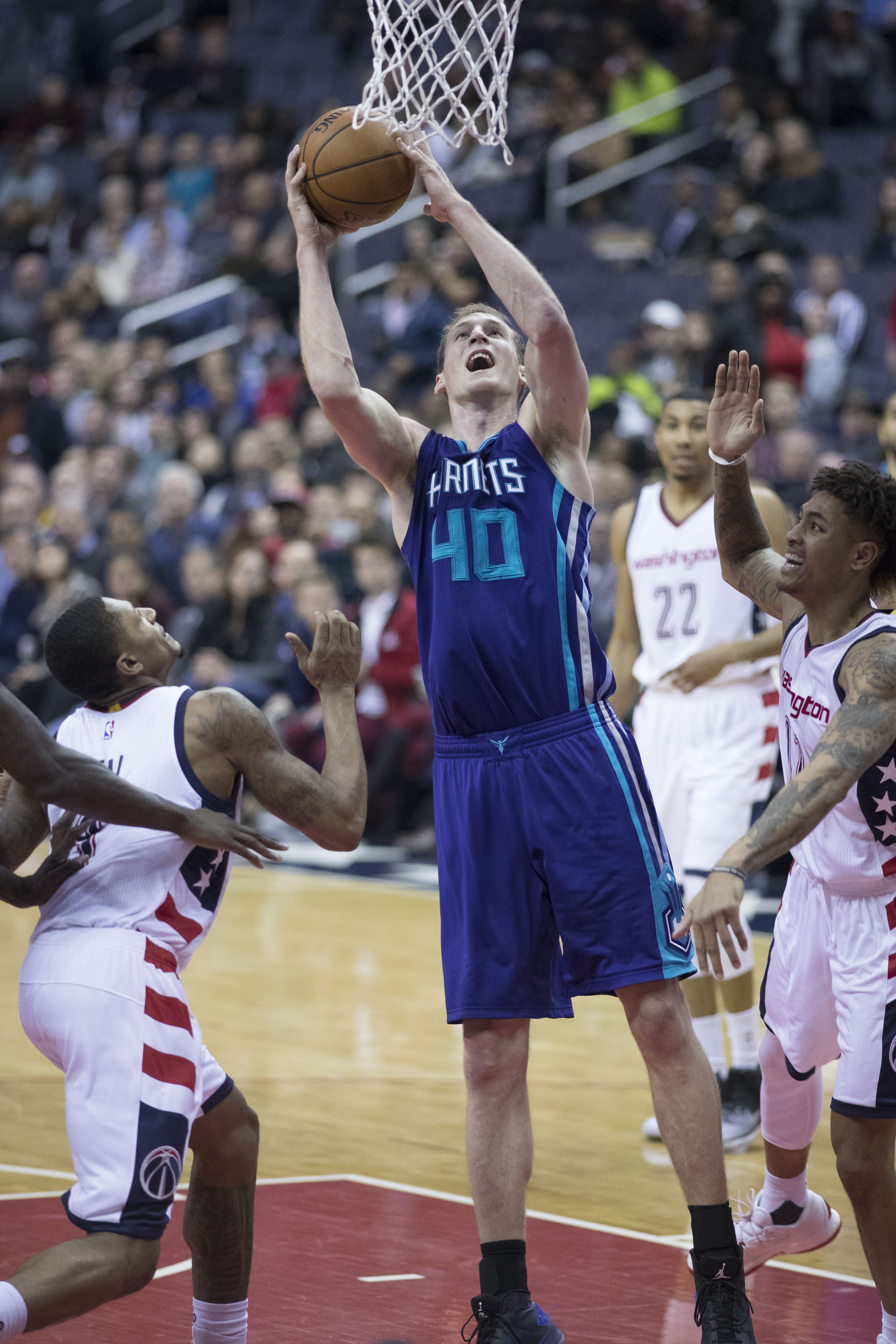
Zeller with the Hornets in December 2016

Zeller was selected with the fourth overall pick in the 2013 NBA draft by the Charlotte Bobcats. On July 10, 2013, he signed his rookie scale contract with the Bobcats.

On March 31, 2014, he scored a season-high 15 points against the Washington Wizards. On April 5, 2014, he recorded his first career double-double with 12 points and 11 rebounds against the Cleveland Cavaliers. He appeared in all 82 regular season games and all four of Charlotte's playoff games. At the season's end, he was named to the NBA All-Rookie Second Team.

On November 28, 2014, Zeller recorded 15 points and 14 rebounds against the Golden State Warriors. On January 31, 2015, he scored a season-high 21 points in a 104–86 win over the Denver Nuggets.

On February 19, 2016, Zeller scored a career-high 23 points in a 98–95 win over the Milwaukee Bucks. He had five double-doubles during the season.

==== 2016–21: Double-digit streaks and career-highs ====
Despite missing the entire preseason because of a right knee injury, Zeller played in the Hornets' season opener on October 26, 2016, going 5 of 6 from the field for 15 points in 14 minutes in a 107–96 win over the Bucks. Five days later, he signed a four-year, $56 million contract extension with the Hornets. On November 18, 2016, he tied his career high with 23 points in a 100–96 win over the Atlanta Hawks. He averaged career highs in 2016–17 with 10.3 points and 6.5 rebounds.

Zeller played in the Hornets' season opener then missed the next four games. On December 6, 2017, in a 101–87 loss to the Warriors, Zeller suffered a torn medial meniscus in his left knee with 49 seconds left in the third quarter. He missed 27 games as a result, returning to action on February 2 against the Indiana Pacers. He missed games on February 28 and March 2 with a sore left knee. He later missed the final 16 games of the season with knee soreness. Due to injury, he appeared in a career-low 33 games in 2017–18.

On November 28, 2018, Zeller scored a then season-high 19 points in a 108–94 win over the Hawks. On December 14, in a 126–124 overtime loss to the New York Knicks, Zeller had season highs in points (21) and rebounds (13) to record the first 20-point, 10-rebound game of his career and tally his first double-double of the season. It also marked his third-straight double-digit scoring performance. On December 31, Zeller suffered a broken right hand against the Orlando Magic. He was subsequently ruled out for four to six weeks after undergoing surgery. He returned to action on February 5 against the Los Angeles Clippers after missing 16 games. On February 25, he made 13 of 14 shots from the field and finished with a career-high 28 points in a 121–110 loss to the Warriors.

=== Portland Trail Blazers (2021–2022) ===
On August 4, 2021, Zeller signed with the Portland Trail Blazers. He was waived on February 8, 2022, to make room for players acquired in the CJ McCollum trade.

On September 25, 2022, Zeller signed with the Utah Jazz. On October 15, he was waived.

=== Miami Heat (2023) ===
On February 20, 2023, Zeller signed with the Miami Heat. The eighth-seeded Heat would embark on a Cinderella run through the playoffs, culminating in an Eastern Conference championship. In his tenth season, Zeller reached the NBA Finals for the first time in his career. The Heat would ultimately fall to the Denver Nuggets in five games.

=== New Orleans Pelicans (2023–2024) ===
On July 6, 2023, Zeller signed with the New Orleans Pelicans.

On July 6, 2024, Zeller, Larry Nance Jr., E. J. Liddell, Dyson Daniels, a 2025 first-round pick (via Lakers), and a conditional 2027 first-round pick were traded to the Atlanta Hawks in exchange for Dejounte Murray. Zeller was acquired via a sign-and-trade deal.

On February 6, 2025, Zeller and a 2028 second-round pick were traded to the Houston Rockets in exchange for the draft rights to Alpha Kaba.

On March 2, 2025, Cody Zeller was waived by the Houston Rockets to create roster space for guard Nate Williams.

== Career statistics ==
Legend
GP	Games played	GS	Games started	MPG	Minutes per game
FG%	Field goal percentage	3P%	3-point field goal percentage	FT%	Free throw percentage
RPG	Rebounds per game	APG	Assists per game	SPG	Steals per game
BPG	Blocks per game	PPG	Points per game	**Bold**	Career high

=== NBA ===
==== Regular season ====
Year	Team	GP	GS	MPG	FG%	3P%	FT%	RPG	APG	SPG	BPG	PPG
2013–14	Charlotte	**82**	3	17.3	.426	.000	.730	4.3	1.1	.5	.5	6.0
2014–15	Charlotte	62	45	24.0	.461	**1.000**	.774	5.8	1.6	.5	.8	7.6
2015–16	Charlotte	73	**60**	24.3	.529	.100	.754	6.2	1.0	.8	.9	8.7
2016–17	Charlotte	62	58	**27.8**	.571	.000	.679	6.5	1.6	**1.0**	**1.0**	10.3
2017–18	Charlotte	33	0	19.0	.545	.667	.718	5.4	.9	.4	.6	7.1
2018–19	Charlotte	49	47	25.4	.551	.273	**.787**	6.8	**2.1**	.8	.8	10.1
2019–20	Charlotte	58	39	23.1	.524	.240	.682	**7.1**	1.5	.7	.4	**11.1**
2020–21	Charlotte	48	21	20.9	.559	.143	.714	6.8	1.8	.6	.4	9.4
2021–22	Portland	27	0	13.1	.567	.000	.776	4.6	.8	.3	.2	5.2
2022–23	Miami	15	2	14.4	**.627**	.000	.686	4.3	.7	.2	.3	6.5
2023–24	New Orleans	43	0	7.4	.419	.333	.605	2.6	.9	.2	.1	1.8
Career		552	275	20.9	.520	.220	.727	5.7	1.3	.6	.6	7.9

==== Playoffs ====
Year	Team	GP	GS	MPG	FG%	3P%	FT%	RPG	APG	SPG	BPG	PPG
2014	Charlotte	4	0	13.3	.333	–	.500	2.3	**.5**	.0	**.8**	2.0
2016	Charlotte	7	**2**	**19.6**	.553	–	**.810**	**5.3**	.3	**.1**	.4	**8.4**
2023	Miami	**21**	0	8.3	**.571**	–	.400	2.3	.3	**.1**	.2	2.2
Career		32	2	11.4	.537	–	.625	2.9	.3	.1	.3	3.5

=== College ===
Year	Team	GP	GS	MPG	FG%	3P%	FT%	RPG	APG	SPG	BPG	PPG
2011–12	Indiana	**36**	**36**	28.5	**.623**	–	.755	6.6	**1.3**	**1.4**	1.2	15.6
2012–13	Indiana	**36**	**36**	**29.5**	.564	.000	**.757**	**8.0**	**1.3**	1.0	**1.3**	**16.5**
Career		72	72	29.0	.592	.000	.756	7.3	1.3	1.2	1.2	16.1

== Player profile ==
In college, analysts described Zeller's "mobility, scoring instincts, and aggressiveness" as particularly noteworthy. Zeller is also known for a "high basketball IQ" and unselfish play.

== Personal life ==
Zeller is from Washington, Indiana and the nephew of former NBA player Al Eberhard. He is the youngest brother of former North Carolina and NBA center Tyler Zeller and former Notre Dame and Phoenix Suns forward-center Luke Zeller. Despite pressures brought on by unusually high expectations, commentators have noted his humility and work ethic, along with "dry wit and prankster's mirth." In May 2017, Zeller earned his bachelor's degree when he graduated from Indiana University's Kelley School of Business.

He married Contemporary Christian recording artist, Leanna Crawford, in 2023.
