= 2023–24 New Orleans Pelicans season =

- Head coach: Willie Green
- General manager: Trajan Langdon
- Owner: Gayle Benson
- Arena: Smoothie King Center

Results
- Record: 49–33 (.598)
- Place: Division: 2nd (Southwest); Conference: 7th (Western)
- Playoff finish: First round (lost to Thunder 0–4)
- Stats at Basketball Reference

Local media
- Television: Bally Sports New Orleans; Gray Television (Note: Affiliates include: WVUE-DT (New Orleans, Louisiana); WAFB (Baton Rouge, Louisiana); KADN-TV (Lafayette, Louisiana); KSLA (Shreveport, Louisiana); KPLC (Lake Charles, Louisiana); KNOE-TV (Monroe, Louisiana); KALB-TV (Alexandria, Louisiana); WLOX (Biloxi, Mississippi); WLBT (Jackson, Mississippi); WDAM-TV (Laurel, Mississippi); WTOK-TV (Meridian, Mississippi); WALA-TV (Mobile, Alabama)) (10 games)
- Radio: WRNO-FM

The 2023–24 New Orleans Pelicans season was the 22nd season of the New Orleans Pelicans franchise in the National Basketball Association (NBA).

The Pelicans won the West Group B of the 2023 NBA In-Season Tournament after going 3–1 in the group stage. They defeated the Sacramento Kings in the quarterfinals, but were later eliminated by the eventual inaugural tournament champions Los Angeles Lakers in the semifinals.

The Pelicans finished the regular season with a 49–33 record, finishing 7th in the West and qualified for the NBA play-in tournament. Despite losing to the Los Angeles Lakers in the first stage of the play-in, they defeated the Sacramento Kings in the second game, returning to the playoffs after a one-year absence. However, they were swept in the first round by the top-seeded Oklahoma City Thunder.

The New Orleans Pelicans drew an average home attendance of 17,301 in 40 home games in the 2023-24 NBA season, the 24th highest in the league. The total attendance was 692,054.

== Draft ==
Round	Pick	Player	Position	Nationality	College / Club
1	14	Jordan Hawkins	SG	United States	UConn (So.)

The Pelicans had one first-round pick entering the draft. Their second-round pick was conveyed to the Atlanta Hawks because it fell outside the Top 45, having been included as part of a trade in 2019.

== Roster ==
2023–24 New Orleans Pelicans roster
Players

Pos.	No.	Player	Height	Weight	DOB	From
G	15	Jose Alvarado	6 ft 0 in (1.83 m)	179 lb (81 kg)	1998-04-12	Georgia Tech
G	11	Dyson Daniels	6 ft 7 in (2.01 m)	199 lb (90 kg)	2003-03-17	Australia
G	24	Jordan Hawkins	6 ft 5 in (1.96 m)	190 lb (86 kg)	2002-04-29	Connecticut
F	33	Malcolm Hill (TW)	6 ft 6 in (1.98 m)	220 lb (100 kg)	1995-10-26	Illinois
F	14	Brandon Ingram	6 ft 8 in (2.03 m)	190 lb (86 kg)	1997-09-02	Duke
F	5	Herbert Jones	6 ft 7 in (2.01 m)	206 lb (93 kg)	1998-10-06	Alabama
F	32	E. J. Liddell	6 ft 7 in (2.01 m)	240 lb (109 kg)	2000-12-18	Ohio State
F	8	Naji Marshall	6 ft 7 in (2.01 m)	220 lb (100 kg)	1998-01-24	Xavier
G	3	CJ McCollum	6 ft 3 in (1.91 m)	190 lb (86 kg)	1991-09-19	Lehigh
F	25	Trey III Murphy	6 ft 8 in (2.03 m)	206 lb (93 kg)	2000-06-18	Virginia
F/C	22	Larry Jr. Nance	6 ft 8 in (2.03 m)	245 lb (111 kg)	1993-01-01	Wyoming
F/C	50	Jeremiah Robinson-Earl	6 ft 8 in (2.03 m)	240 lb (109 kg)	2000-11-03	Villanova
F	37	Matt Ryan	6 ft 6 in (1.98 m)	215 lb (98 kg)	1997-04-17	Chattanooga
G	0	Dereon Seabron (TW)	6 ft 5 in (1.96 m)	180 lb (82 kg)	2000-05-26	NC State
C	17	Jonas Valančiūnas	6 ft 11 in (2.11 m)	265 lb (120 kg)	1992-05-06	Lithuania
F	1	Zion Williamson (injured)	6 ft 7 in (2.01 m)	284 lb (129 kg)	2000-07-06	Duke
C	40	Cody Zeller	7 ft 0 in (2.13 m)	240 lb (109 kg)	1992-10-05	Indiana

Coaches
Head coach
- Willie Green
Assistant(s)
- James Borrego (associate HC)
- Jarron Collins
- Casey Hill
- Aaron Miles
- Fred Vinson

Legend
- (DP) Unsigned draft pick
- (FA) Free agent
- (S) Suspended
- (GL) On assignment to G League
- (TW) Two-way affiliate player
- Injured

Roster
Updated: April 13, 2024

== Standings ==
=== Division ===
Southwest Division	W	L	PCT	GB	Home	Road	Div	GP
y – Dallas Mavericks	50	32	.610	–	25‍–‍16	25‍–‍16	11‍–‍5	82
x – New Orleans Pelicans	49	33	.598	1.0	21‍–‍19	28‍–‍14	9‍–‍7	82
Houston Rockets	41	41	.500	9.0	27‍–‍14	14‍–‍27	9‍–‍7	82
Memphis Grizzlies	27	55	.329	23.0	9‍–‍32	18‍–‍23	8‍–‍8	82
San Antonio Spurs	22	60	.268	28.0	12‍–‍29	10‍–‍31	3‍–‍13	82

=== Conference ===
Western Conference
#	Team	W	L	PCT	GB	GP
1	c – Oklahoma City Thunder *	57	25	.695	–	82
2	x – Denver Nuggets	57	25	.695	–	82
3	x – Minnesota Timberwolves	56	26	.683	1.0	82
4	y – Los Angeles Clippers *	51	31	.622	6.0	82
5	y – Dallas Mavericks *	50	32	.610	7.0	82
6	x – Phoenix Suns	49	33	.598	8.0	82
7	x – New Orleans Pelicans	49	33	.598	8.0	82
8	x – Los Angeles Lakers	47	35	.573	10.0	82
9	pi – Sacramento Kings	46	36	.561	11.0	82
10	pi – Golden State Warriors	46	36	.561	11.0	82
11	Houston Rockets	41	41	.500	16.0	82
12	Utah Jazz	31	51	.378	26.0	82
13	Memphis Grizzlies	27	55	.329	30.0	82
14	San Antonio Spurs	22	60	.268	35.0	82
15	Portland Trail Blazers	21	61	.256	36.0	82

== Game log ==
=== Preseason ===
2023 preseason game log
Total: 1–3 (Home: 0–2; Road: 1–1)
Preseason: 1–3 (home: 0–2; road: 1–1)

Game	Date	Team	Score	High points	High rebounds	High assists	Location Attendance	Record
1	October 10	Orlando	L 105–122	Brandon Ingram (14)	Jonas Valančiūnas (11)	Zion Williamson (5)	Smoothie King Center; 16,058	0–1
2	October 12	Houston	L 87–120	CJ McCollum (17)	Daniels, Ingram (5)	Ingram, Lewis Jr., Valančiūnas (3)	Legacy Arena; 11,589	0–2
3	October 14	@ Atlanta	L 105–110	Jordan Hawkins (17)	Trey Jemison (9)	Daniels, Williamson (5)	Gateway Center Arena; 3,051	0–3
4	October 17	@ Orlando	W 104–92	Brandon Ingram (18)	Trey Jemison (9)	Brandon Ingram (6)	Amway Center; 17,622	1–3

2023–24 preseason schedule

=== Regular season ===
2023–24 game log
Total: 49–33 (Home: 21–19; Road: 28–14)
October: 2–1 (home: 1–1; road: 1–0)

Game	Date	Team	Score	High points	High rebounds	High assists	Location Attendance	Record
1	October 25	@ Memphis	W 111–104	CJ McCollum (24)	Jonas Valančiūnas (12)	Ingram, McCollum (6)	FedExForum; 17,798	1–0
2	October 28	New York	W 96–87	Brandon Ingram (26)	Brandon Ingram (7)	CJ McCollum (7)	Smoothie King Center; 16,331	2–0
3	October 30	Golden State	L 102–130	McCollum, Williamson (19)	McCollum, Valančiūnas (6)	CJ McCollum (5)	Smoothie King Center; 17,286	2–1

November: 8–8 (home: 6–3; road: 2–5)

Game	Date	Team	Score	High points	High rebounds	High assists	Location Attendance	Record
4	November 1	@ Oklahoma City	W 110–106	CJ McCollum (29)	CJ McCollum (11)	Zion Williamson (8)	Paycom Center; 15,764	3–1
5	November 2	Detroit	W 125–116	CJ McCollum (33)	Jonas Valančiūnas (13)	Dyson Daniels (6)	Smoothie King Center; 15,884	4–1
6	November 4	Atlanta	L 105–123	Zion Williamson (25)	Ingram, Valančiūnas (7)	CJ McCollum (6)	Smoothie King Center; 17,237	4–2
7	November 6	@ Denver	L 116–134	Jordan Hawkins (31)	Jonas Valančiūnas (11)	Zion Williamson (9)	Ball Arena; 19,544	4–3
8	November 8	@ Minnesota	L 101–122	Brandon Ingram (24)	Jeremiah Robinson-Earl (9)	Ingram, Zeller (6)	Target Center; 18,024	4–4
9	November 10	@ Houston	L 101–104	Brandon Ingram (31)	Dyson Daniels (10)	Brandon Ingram (5)	Toyota Center; 16,236	4–5
10	November 12	Dallas	L 124–136	Brandon Ingram (20)	Jonas Valančiūnas (10)	Brandon Ingram (5)	Smoothie King Center; 16,302	4–6
11	November 14	Dallas	W 131–110	Hawkins, Ingram (25)	Brandon Ingram (9)	Brandon Ingram (7)	Smoothie King Center; 16,354	5–6
12	November 17	Denver	W 115–110	Zion Williamson (26)	Daniels, Valančiūnas (8)	Brandon Ingram (8)	Smoothie King Center; 15,278	6–6
13	November 18	Minnesota	L 120–121	Brandon Ingram (30)	Jonas Valančiūnas (11)	Herbert Jones (8)	Smoothie King Center; 15,536	6–7
14	November 20	Sacramento	W 129–93	Brandon Ingram (31)	Jonas Valančiūnas (13)	Jonas Valančiūnas (7)	Smoothie King Center; 16,004	7–7
15	November 22	Sacramento	W 117–112	Zion Williamson (25)	Jonas Valančiūnas (11)	Zion Williamson (6)	Smoothie King Center; 16,012	8–7
16	November 24	@ L.A. Clippers	W 116–106	Zion Williamson (32)	Daniels, Marshall, Valančiūnas (8)	Daniels, Ingram, Williamson (5)	Crypto.com Arena; 19,370	9–7
17	November 25	@ Utah	L 100–105	Brandon Ingram (26)	Jonas Valančiūnas (7)	Brandon Ingram (8)	Delta Center; 18,206	9–8
18	November 27	@ Utah	L 112–114	Zion Williamson (26)	Jonas Valančiūnas (13)	Zion Williamson (7)	Delta Center; 18,206	9–9
19	November 29	Philadelphia	W 124–114	Zion Williamson (33)	Zion Williamson (8)	Ingram, Jones, Williamson (6)	Smoothie King Center; 16,009	10–9

December: 9–5 (home: 4–3; road: 5–2)

Game	Date	Team	Score	High points	High rebounds	High assists	Location Attendance	Record
20	December 1	San Antonio	W 121–106	Jonas Valančiūnas (24)	Jonas Valančiūnas (12)	CJ McCollum (8)	Smoothie King Center; 17,028	11–9
21	December 2	@ Chicago	L 118–124	Zion Williamson (27)	Jonas Valančiūnas (10)	Brandon Ingram (6)	United Center; 20,511	11–10
22	December 4	@ Sacramento	W 127–117	Brandon Ingram (30)	Jonas Valančiūnas (11)	CJ McCollum (7)	Golden 1 Center; 18,048	12–10
23	December 7	@ L.A. Lakers	L 89–133	Trey Murphy III (14)	Dyson Daniels (8)	Brandon Ingram (7)	T-Mobile Arena; 18,017	12–11
24	December 11	Minnesota	W 121–107	Zion Williamson (36)	Jonas Valančiūnas (13)	Ingram, Jones (5)	Smoothie King Center; 16,487	13–11
25	December 13	@ Washington	W 142–122	Brandon Ingram (40)	Jonas Valančiūnas (18)	Naji Marshall (7)	Capital One Arena; 14,080	14–11
26	December 15	@ Charlotte	W 112–107	Jonas Valančiūnas (29)	Jonas Valančiūnas (13)	Brandon Ingram (7)	Spectrum Center; 16,080	15–11
27	December 17	@ San Antonio	W 146–110	CJ McCollum (29)	Jonas Valančiūnas (15)	Naji Marshall (7)	Frost Bank Center; 18,354	16–11
28	December 19	Memphis	L 113–115	Brandon Ingram (34)	Jonas Valančiūnas (14)	Ingram, McCollum (6)	Smoothie King Center; 18,355	16–12
29	December 21	@ Cleveland	W 123–104	Trey Murphy III (28)	Ingram, Valančiūnas (7)	Brandon Ingram (6)	Rocket Mortgage FieldHouse; 19,432	17–12
30	December 23	Houston	L 104–106	Zion Williamson (28)	Jonas Valančiūnas (11)	Ingram, Valančiūnas (5)	Smoothie King Center; 17,399	17–13
31	December 26	Memphis	L 115–116 (OT)	Brandon Ingram (24)	Jonas Valančiūnas (13)	Brandon Ingram (7)	Smoothie King Center; 18,538	17–14
32	December 28	Utah	W 112–105	Brandon Ingram (26)	Zion Williamson (10)	Zion Williamson (8)	Smoothie King Center; 17,753	18–14
33	December 31	L.A. Lakers	W 129–109	Ingram, Williamson (26)	Larry Nance Jr. (10)	CJ McCollum (9)	Smoothie King Center; 18,434	19–14

January: 8–7 (home: 3–3; road: 5–4)

Game	Date	Team	Score	High points	High rebounds	High assists	Location Attendance	Record
34	January 2	Brooklyn	W 112–85	CJ McCollum (16)	Jonas Valančiūnas (12)	Ingram, McCollum, Williamson (5)	Smoothie King Center; 16,253	20–14
35	January 3	@ Minnesota	W 117–106	Zion Williamson (27)	Larry Nance Jr. (9)	Brandon Ingram (7)	Target Center; 18,024	21–14
36	January 5	L.A. Clippers	L 95–111	Hawkins, Valančiūnas (13)	Jonas Valančiūnas (11)	Brandon Ingram (4)	Smoothie King Center; 18,329	21–15
37	January 7	@ Sacramento	W 133–100	CJ McCollum (30)	Jonas Valančiūnas (12)	Brandon Ingram (8)	Golden 1 Center; 17,832	22–15
38	January 10	@ Golden State	W 141–105	Jonas Valančiūnas (21)	Jonas Valančiūnas (9)	CJ McCollum (8)	Chase Center; 18,064	23–15
39	January 12	@ Denver	L 113–125	Zion Williamson (30)	Valančiūnas, Williamson (6)	CJ McCollum (7)	Ball Arena; 19,638	23–16
40	January 13	@ Dallas	W 118–108	Jordan Hawkins (34)	Jonas Valančiūnas (12)	Daniels, Valančiūnas (7)	American Airlines Center; 20,155	24–16
41	January 15	@ Dallas	L 120–125	Zion Williamson (30)	Larry Nance Jr. (8)	Brandon Ingram (5)	American Airlines Center; 20,010	24–17
42	January 17	Charlotte	W 132–112	Brandon Ingram (28)	Brandon Ingram (10)	Brandon Ingram (10)	Smoothie King Center; 16,093	25–17
43	January 19	Phoenix	L 109–123	Zion Williamson (24)	Jonas Valančiūnas (11)	Brandon Ingram (11)	Smoothie King Center; 18,686	25–18
44	January 23	Utah	W 153–124	CJ McCollum (33)	Jonas Valančiūnas (12)	Zion Williamson (11)	Smoothie King Center; 16,032	26–18
45	January 26	Oklahoma City	L 83–107	Jones, Valančiūnas (14)	Jonas Valančiūnas (9)	Brandon Ingram (9)	Smoothie King Center; 18,624	26–19
46	January 27	@ Milwaukee	L 117–141	Brandon Ingram (26)	Jonas Valančiūnas (10)	Jonas Valančiūnas (6)	Fiserv Forum; 17,940	26–20
47	January 29	@ Boston	L 112–118	Brandon Ingram (28)	Ingram, Valančiūnas (7)	Brandon Ingram (6)	TD Garden; 19,156	26–21
48	January 31	@ Houston	W 110–99	Jonas Valančiūnas (25)	Jonas Valančiūnas (14)	Brandon Ingram (4)	Toyota Center; 18,055	27–21

February: 8–4 (home: 3–2; road: 5–2)

Game	Date	Team	Score	High points	High rebounds	High assists	Location Attendance	Record
49	February 2	@ San Antonio	W 114–113	Zion Williamson (33)	Jonas Valančiūnas (9)	Brandon Ingram (6)	Frost Bank Center; 17,207	28–21
50	February 5	Toronto	W 138–100	Brandon Ingram (41)	Jonas Valančiūnas (12)	Brandon Ingram (9)	Smoothie King Center; 17,429	29–21
51	February 7	@ L.A. Clippers	W 117–106	CJ McCollum (25)	Brandon Ingram (8)	Zion Williamson (10)	Crypto.com Arena; 19,370	30–21
52	February 9	@ L.A. Lakers	L 122–139	Zion Williamson (30)	Jonas Valančiūnas (10)	Brandon Ingram (7)	Crypto.com Arena; 18,997	30–22
53	February 10	@ Portland	W 93–84	Trey Murphy III (24)	Jonas Valančiūnas (9)	Brandon Ingram (9)	Moda Center; 18,226	31–22
54	February 12	@ Memphis	W 96–87	Herbert Jones (17)	Jones, Nance Jr. (9)	Brandon Ingram (6)	FedExForum; 15,823	32–22
55	February 14	Washington	W 133–126	Zion Williamson (36)	Jones, Nance Jr., Williamson (6)	Ingram, Williamson (8)	Smoothie King Center; 18,316	33–22
All-Star Game
56	February 22	Houston	W 127–105	CJ McCollum (28)	Jonas Valančiūnas (14)	Zion Williamson (10)	Smoothie King Center; 17,421	34–22
57	February 23	Miami	L 95–106	Zion Williamson (23)	Jonas Valančiūnas (10)	Zion Williamson (7)	Smoothie King Center; 18,658	34–23
58	February 25	Chicago	L 106–114	Brandon Ingram (22)	Jonas Valančiūnas (17)	Zion Williamson (11)	Smoothie King Center; 18,684	34–24
59	February 27	@ New York	W 115–92	Trey Murphy III (26)	Jonas Valančiūnas (9)	Brandon Ingram (5)	Madison Square Garden; 19,812	35–24
60	February 28	@ Indiana	L 114–123	Brandon Ingram (30)	Naji Marshall (8)	Trey Murphy III (7)	Gainbridge Fieldhouse; 16,010	35–25

March: 10–4 (home: 4–3; road: 6–1)

Game	Date	Team	Score	High points	High rebounds	High assists	Location Attendance	Record
61	March 1	Indiana	W 129–102	Brandon Ingram (34)	Jonas Valančiūnas (9)	Zion Williamson (7)	Smoothie King Center; 17,898	36–25
62	March 5	@ Toronto	W 139–98	Trey Murphy III (34)	Jonas Valančiūnas (10)	Zion Williamson (9)	Scotiabank Arena; 18,864	37–25
63	March 8	@ Philadelphia	W 103–95	Zion Williamson (23)	Zion Williamson (12)	Brandon Ingram (5)	Wells Fargo Center; 19,777	38–25
64	March 10	@ Atlanta	W 116–103	Trey Murphy III (28)	Jonas Valančiūnas (9)	Brandon Ingram (10)	State Farm Arena; 17,695	39–25
65	March 13	Cleveland	L 95–116	Zion Williamson (33)	Zion Williamson (9)	Brandon Ingram (5)	Smoothie King Center; 17,727	39–26
66	March 15	L.A. Clippers	W 112–104	Zion Williamson (34)	Zion Williamson (7)	Brandon Ingram (7)	Smoothie King Center; 18,865	40–26
67	March 16	Portland	W 126–107	CJ McCollum (30)	Zion Williamson (10)	CJ McCollum (8)	Smoothie King Center; 17,725	41–26
68	March 19	@ Brooklyn	W 104–91	Zion Williamson (28)	Larry Nance Jr. (10)	Brandon Ingram (6)	Barclays Center; 17,732	42–26
69	March 21	@ Orlando	L 106–121	Trey Murphy III (21)	Zion Williamson (7)	Herbert Jones (5)	Kia Center; 17,094	42–27
70	March 22	@ Miami	W 111–88	CJ McCollum (30)	Jonas Valančiūnas (10)	CJ McCollum (7)	Kaseya Center; 19,727	43–27
71	March 24	@ Detroit	W 114–101	Zion Williamson (36)	Marshall, Murphy III (8)	CJ McCollum (7)	Little Caesars Arena; 19,922	44–27
72	March 26	Oklahoma City	L 112–119	Zion Williamson (29)	McCollum, Murphy III, Valančiūnas (6)	Zion Williamson (10)	Smoothie King Center; 17,436	44–28
73	March 28	Milwaukee	W 107–100	Zion Williamson (28)	Trey Murphy III (11)	CJ McCollum (7)	Smoothie King Center; 17,484	45–28
74	March 30	Boston	L 92–104	Zion Williamson (25)	Williamson, Murphy III (9)	CJ McCollum (5)	Smoothie King Center; 17,932	45–29

April: 4–4 (home: 0–4; road: 4–0)

Game	Date	Team	Score	High points	High rebounds	High assists	Location Attendance	Record
75	April 1	Phoenix	L 111–124	Zion Williamson (30)	Daniels, Nance Jr., Valančiūnas (7)	CJ McCollum (9)	Smoothie King Center; 17,753	45–30
76	April 3	Orlando	L 108–117	CJ McCollum (36)	CJ McCollum (10)	Zion Williamson (5)	Smoothie King Center; 16,427	45–31
77	April 5	San Antonio	L 109–111	CJ McCollum (31)	Trey Murphy III (8)	Jonas Valančiūnas (7)	Smoothie King Center; 17,422	45–32
78	April 7	@ Phoenix	W 113–105	CJ McCollum (31)	Zion Williamson (10)	Nance Jr., Williamson (7)	Footprint Center; 17,071	46–32
79	April 9	@ Portland	W 110–100	Trey Murphy III (31)	Murphy III, Valančiūnas (8)	Daniels, Valančiūnas (5)	Moda Center; 18,341	47–32
80	April 11	@ Sacramento	W 135–123	McCollum, Williamson (31)	Jonas Valančiūnas (10)	CJ McCollum (7)	Golden 1 Center; 17,832	48–32
81	April 12	@ Golden State	W 114–109	CJ McCollum (28)	Daniels, Murphy III (8)	Dyson Daniels (7)	Chase Center; 18,064	49–32
82	April 14	L.A. Lakers	L 108–124	CJ McCollum (25)	Zion Williamson (8)	Zion Williamson (8)	Smoothie King Center; 18,633	49–33

2023–24 season schedule

=== Play-in ===
2024 play-in game log
Total: 1–1 (home: 1–1; road: 0–0)
Play-in: 1–1 (home: 1–1; road: 0–0)

Game	Date	Team	Score	High points	High rebounds	High assists	Location Attendance	Record
1	April 16	L.A. Lakers	L 106–110	Zion Williamson (40)	Larry Nance Jr. (12)	Jose Alvarado (7)	Smoothie King Center; 18,591	0–1
2	April 19	Sacramento	W 105–98	Brandon Ingram (24)	Jonas Valančiūnas (12)	Ingram, Murphy III (6)	Smoothie King Center; 18,656	1–1

2023–24 season schedule

=== Playoffs ===
2024 playoff game log
Total: 0–4 (home: 0–2; road: 0–2)
First Round: 0–4 (home: 0–2; road: 0–2)

Game	Date	Team	Score	High points	High rebounds	High assists	Location Attendance	Series
1	April 21	@ Oklahoma City	L 92–94	Trey Murphy III (21)	Jonas Valančiūnas (20)	CJ McCollum (6)	Paycom Center; 18,203	0–1
2	April 24	@ Oklahoma City	L 92–124	Jonas Valančiūnas (19)	Jonas Valančiūnas (7)	CJ McCollum (4)	Paycom Center; 18,203	0–2
3	April 27	Oklahoma City	L 85–106	Brandon Ingram (19)	Larry Nance Jr. (13)	CJ McCollum (7)	Smoothie King Center; 18,659	0–3
4	April 29	Oklahoma City	L 89–97	CJ McCollum (20)	Jonas Valančiūnas (13)	Brandon Ingram (6)	Smoothie King Center; 18,487	0–4

2024 playoff schedule

=== In-Season Tournament ===
This was the first regular season where all the NBA teams competed in a mid-season tournament setting due to the implementation of the 2023 NBA In-Season Tournament. During the in-season tournament period, the Pelicans competed in Group B of the Western Conference, which included the defending champion Denver Nuggets, the Los Angeles Clippers, the Dallas Mavericks, and the Houston Rockets. Despite having a couple of scares by not only losing to the Houston Rockets and barely not scoring enough points to overtake the Phoenix Suns for the wild card spot had it been deemed necessary, the Pelicans ultimately managed to secure Group B's top seed for the in-season tournament. In the first knockout round, the Pelicans beat the winners of Group C, the Sacramento Kings, by a final score of 127–117 on the road. Tragically, during that night, a 34-year-old Kings fan named Gregorio "Greg" Florez Breedlove had a medical emergency during the first quarter of that game and died 20 minutes after emergency medical services arrived to try and help him out. For their semifinal game that also counted as their 82nd game of the regular season, their opponent was the Los Angeles Lakers, who were considered the home team in the neutral site of the T-Mobile Arena in Las Vegas, Nevada due to their record in the In-Season Tournament. The Pelicans would suffer a brutal, crushing defeat to the Lakers in their December 7 match-up, with the Lakers winning 133-89 that night.

==== West group B ====
Pos	Team	Pld	W	L	PF	PA	PD	Qualification	NOP	HOU	DAL	DEN	LAC
1	New Orleans Pelicans	4	3	1	463	430	+33	Advance to knockout stage	—	101–104	131–110	115–110	116–106
2	Houston Rockets	4	2 (Note: Tied on head-to-head results. Overall point difference is used as the tiebreaker.)	2	424	414	+10		104–101	—	115–121	105–86	100–106
3	Dallas Mavericks	4	2	2	489	497	−8		110–131	121–115	—	114–125	144–126
4	Denver Nuggets	4	2	2	432	442	−10		110–115	86–105	125–114	—	111–108
5	Los Angeles Clippers	4	1	3	446	471	−25		106–116	106–100	126–144	108–111	—

Source: NBA
Rules for classification: Tiebreakers

== Player statistics ==
Legend
GP	Games played	GS	Games started	MPG	Minutes per game
FG%	Field-goal percentage	3P%	3-point field-goal percentage	FT%	Free-throw percentage
RPG	Rebounds per game	APG	Assists per game	SPG	Steals per game
BPG	Blocks per game	PPG	Points per game

=== Regular season ===
New Orleans Pelicans statistics
Player	GP	GS	MPG	FG%	3P%	FT%	RPG	APG	SPG	BPG	PPG
Jose Alvarado	56	0	18.4	.412	.377	.673	2.3	2.1	1.1	.3	7.1
Izaiah Brockington	1	0	3.0	.400	.000		2.0	.0	.0	.0	4.0
Jalen Crutcher	1	0	3.0	.000			.0	.0	.0	.0	.0
Dyson Daniels	61	16	22.3	.447	.311	.642	3.9	2.7	1.4	.4	5.8
Kaiser Gates	1	0	7.0	.000	.000		1.0	.0	.0	.0	.0
Jordan Hawkins	67	10	17.3	.382	.366	.838	2.2	1.0	.3	.1	7.8
Brandon Ingram	64	64	32.9	.492	.355	.801	5.1	5.7	.8	.6	20.8
Herbert Jones	76	76	30.5	.498	.418	.867	3.6	2.6	1.4	.8	11.0
Kira Lewis Jr.^{†}	15	0	9.6	.308	.100	.909	.9	1.2	.3	.1	2.9
E. J. Liddell	8	0	2.9	.167	.000	1.000	.6	.1	.3	.3	.5
Naji Marshall	66	1	19.0	.463	.387	.791	3.6	1.9	.7	.2	7.1
CJ McCollum	66	66	32.7	.459	.429	.827	4.3	4.6	.9	.6	20.0
Trey Murphy III	57	23	29.6	.443	.380	.815	4.9	2.2	.9	.5	14.8
Larry Nance Jr.	61	0	19.9	.573	.415	.770	5.0	1.9	1.0	.3	5.7
Jeremiah Robinson-Earl	39	1	8.6	.474	.333	.750	1.9	.5	.3	.1	2.9
Matt Ryan	28	1	13.9	.434	.451	.929	1.4	.6	.2	.0	5.4
Dereon Seabron	6	0	9.2	.308	.500	.833	1.2	.8	.3	.2	2.3
Jonas Valančiūnas	82	82	23.5	.559	.308	.785	8.8	2.1	.4	.8	12.2
Zion Williamson	70	70	31.5	.570	.333	.702	5.8	5.0	1.1	.7	22.9
Cody Zeller	43	0	7.4	.419	.333	.605	2.6	.9	.2	.1	1.8

=== Playoffs ===
New Orleans Pelicans statistics
Player	GP	GS	MPG	FG%	3P%	FT%	RPG	APG	SPG	BPG	PPG
Jose Alvarado	4	0	15.5	.150	.071		1.0	2.3	1.3	.3	1.8
Dyson Daniels	3	0	5.7	.333	.000		.7	.0	.7	.0	1.3
Jordan Hawkins	3	0	4.0	.000	.000		.7	.0	.0	.0	.0
Brandon Ingram	4	4	36.3	.345	.250	.895	4.5	3.3	1.0	1.3	14.3
Herbert Jones	4	4	35.3	.390	.333	1.000	5.0	2.5	1.3	.3	13.0
E. J. Liddell	1	0	3.0				1.0	.0	.0	.0	.0
Naji Marshall	4	0	21.0	.429	.400	1.000	2.8	1.3	.5	.5	9.0
CJ McCollum	4	4	37.0	.419	.241	1.000	4.8	4.8	1.8	.8	17.8
Trey Murphy III	4	4	42.0	.375	.333		6.5	2.3	1.3	1.5	11.5
Larry Nance Jr.	4	0	21.0	.588	.250	.667	8.3	1.8	.5	.0	6.3
Jeremiah Robinson-Earl	1	0	5.0	.500		.000	1.0	1.0	.0	.0	2.0
Matt Ryan	1	0	3.0	.000	.000		1.0	.0	1.0	.0	.0
Jonas Valančiūnas	4	4	22.5	.524	.000	.824	11.0	1.3	.5	.0	14.5

- ^{†} Denotes player spent time with another team in the season. Stats reflect time with the Pelicans only.

== Transactions ==
=== Free agency ===
==== Subtractions ====
Player	Reason	New Team	Ref.
Josh Richardson	Free agent	Miami Heat	
Garrett Temple	Waived	Toronto Raptors	
