= Dyson Daniels =

Australian basketball player (born 2003)

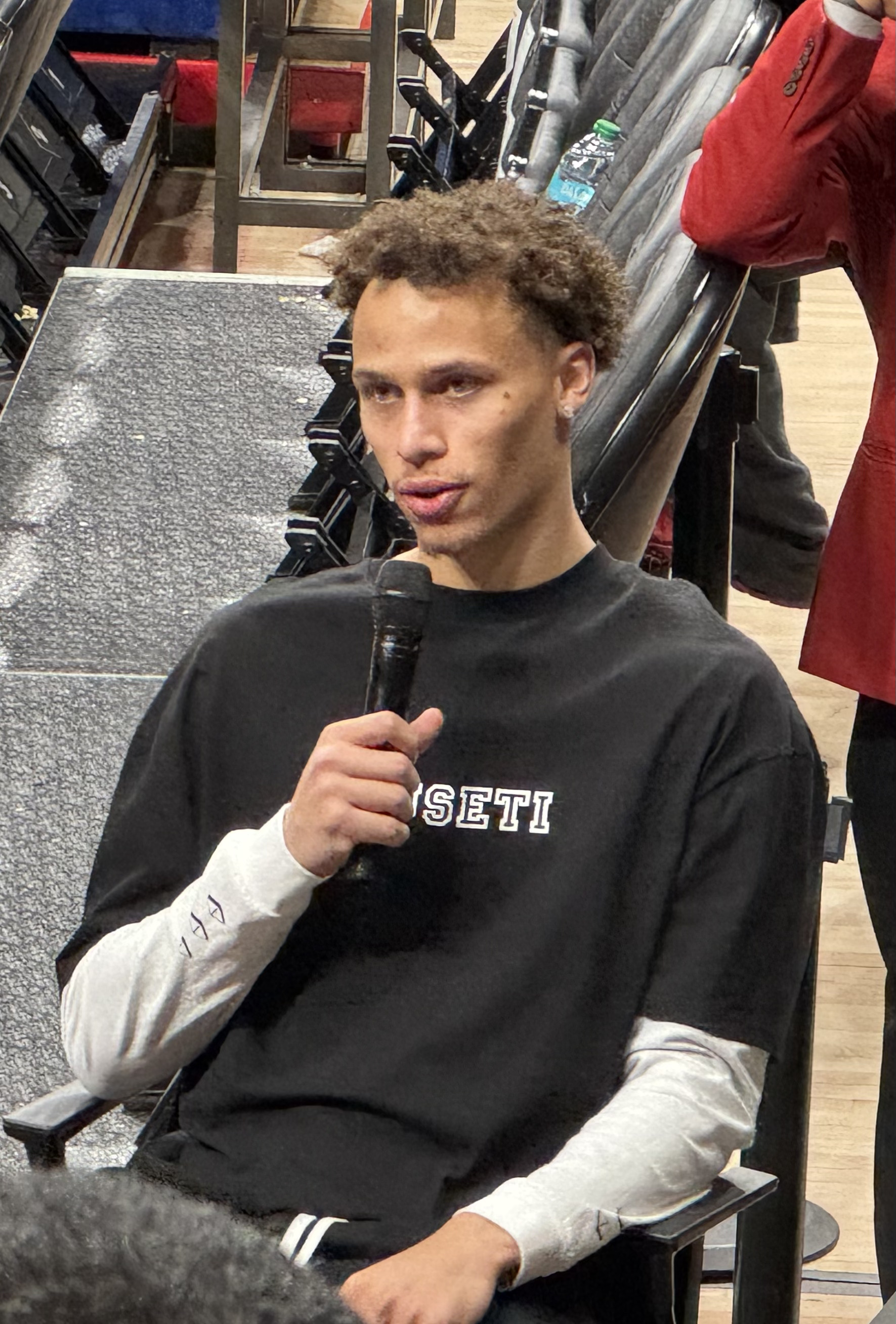
- Daniels in 2025

No. 5 – Atlanta Hawks
- Position: Point guard / shooting guard
- League: NBA

Personal information
- Born: 17 March 2003 (age 23) Bendigo, Victoria, Australia
- Listed height: 6 ft 7 in (2.01 m)
- Listed weight: 199 lb (90 kg)

Career information
- High school: Bendigo South East College (Bendigo, Australia)
- NBA draft: 2022: 1st round, 8th overall pick
- Drafted by: New Orleans Pelicans
- Playing career: 2019–present

Career history
- 2019: Bendigo Braves
- 2021–2022: NBA G League Ignite
- 2022–2024: New Orleans Pelicans
- 2024: →Birmingham Squadron
- 2024–present: Atlanta Hawks

Career highlights
- NBA All-Defensive First Team (2025); NBA All-Defensive Second Team (2026); NBA steals leader (2025); NBA Most Improved Player (2025)
- Stats at NBA.com
- Stats at Basketball Reference
Medals
Men's basketball
Representing Australia
FIBA Oceania U15 Championship
Gold medal – first place	2018 Papua New Guinea

Dyson James Daniels (born 17 March 2003) is an Australian professional basketball player for the Atlanta Hawks of the National Basketball Association (NBA). Nicknamed "the Great Barrier Thief" for his defensive and stealing abilities, he was selected eighth overall by the New Orleans Pelicans in the first round of the 2022 NBA draft. In 2025, Daniels became the first Australian to win the NBA Most Improved Player award.

== Early life and career ==
Daniels was born on March 17, 2003, in Bendigo, Victoria, and started playing basketball at age seven. He attended Bendigo South East College.

Daniels signed with the Bendigo Braves, his father's former team, of the NBL1 for the 2019 season. Later that year, Daniels joined the NBA Global Academy, a training center at the Australian Institute of Sport in Canberra. He helped Victoria win a silver medal at the 2021 Australian Under-20 Championships. Along with basketball, Daniels was a talented Australian rules footballer in his younger years and represented his home state of Victoria at several national football championships before giving up the sport to focus solely on basketball.

== Professional career ==
=== NBA G League Ignite (2021–2022) ===
On 21 June 2021, Daniels signed with the NBA G League Ignite, a developmental team affiliated with the NBA G League. He turned down offers from several college programs and the National Basketball League Next Stars program. Daniels competed in the Rising Stars Challenge at 2022 NBA All-Star Weekend and helped his team win the title. In 26 games in the G League, he averaged 12 points, 7.1 rebounds, 5.1 assists and two steals per game. On 16 April 2022, Daniels declared for the 2022 NBA draft.

=== New Orleans Pelicans (2022–2024) ===
Daniels was selected with the eighth overall pick in the 2022 NBA draft by the New Orleans Pelicans. Daniels joined the Pelicans' 2022 NBA Summer League roster. However, Daniels suffered a right-ankle sprain in the second quarter in the Pelicans' Summer League opener against the Portland Trail Blazers, forcing Daniels to be ruled as out for the rest of the Summer League. On 9 July 2022, Daniels signed a rookie-scale contract with the Pelicans.

=== Atlanta Hawks (2024–present) ===
==== 2024–25 season ====
On 6 July 2024, Daniels, E. J. Liddell, Larry Nance Jr., and Cody Zeller (via sign-and-trade), a 2025 first-round pick (via Lakers), and a conditional 2027 first-round pick were traded to the Atlanta Hawks in exchange for Dejounte Murray.

On 8 November, Daniels put up seven steals in a 122–121 loss to the Detroit Pistons. On 15 November, Daniels became the first player since Michael Jordan in the 1989–90 season to record 15-plus points and five-plus steals in four consecutive NBA games and the first player since Alvin Robertson to record at least six steals in four consecutive NBA games. On 23 December, Daniels recorded a career-high eight steals against the Minnesota Timberwolves.

Daniels finished the 2024–25 season leading the NBA with an average of 3.01 steals per game, totaling 202 steals. This achievement made him the youngest player in NBA history to record 200 steals in a single season, surpassing Magic Johnson's previous record by 236 days. Daniels' defensive impact extended beyond steals; he also led the NBA in deflections (366) and ranked among the top players in combined steals and blocks ("stocks") with 229.

On 30 April, 2025, Daniels became the first Australian to win the NBA Most Improved Player award, after becoming the first player since Alvin Robertson in 1990–91 to average three steals per game. Daniels also finished as the runner-up in the 2025 NBA Defensive Player of the Year voting, earning 25 first-place votes and 197 total points. He was edged out by Cleveland Cavaliers forward-center Evan Mobley, who received 35 first-place votes and 285 total points.

==== 2025–26 season ====
On October 20, 2025, Daniels and the Hawks agreed to a four-year, $100 million contract extension. The Hawks finished the season with a 46–36 record, clinching the sixth seed in the Eastern Conference and a playoff berth. Daniels was named to the NBA All-Defensive Second Team.

On January 9, 2026, Daniels recorded his first career triple-double with 17 points, 11 rebounds, and 10 assists in a 110–87 win over the Denver Nuggets. On April 11, Daniels recorded his second career triple-double with 13 points, 12 assists, and 10 rebounds in a 124–102 win over the Cleveland Cavaliers.

The Hawks faced the New York Knicks during their first-round playoff series. On April 18, Daniels made his playoff debut for the Hawks, recording four points, nine rebounds, 11 assists, and three steals in a 113–102 Game 1 loss. On April 28, he scored a playoff career-high 17 points, alongside five assists, in a 126–97 Game 5 loss. The Hawks wound up losing the series in six games.

== National team career ==
Daniels represented Australia at the 2018 FIBA Oceania Under-15 Championship in Papua New Guinea. He averaged 8.3 points, 3.7 rebounds and 2.7 assists per game, helping his team win the gold medal. On 20 February 2021, a 17-year-old Daniels made his debut for the Australian senior national team at FIBA Asia Cup qualification. He recorded 23 points, six steals and four assists in an 81–52 win over New Zealand. He helped Australia to beat France in a preparation game for the 2024 Olympic Games, scoring a reverse layup on the buzzer to win the game.

== Career statistics ==
Legend
GP	Games played	GS	Games started	MPG	Minutes per game
FG%	Field goal percentage	3P%	3-point field goal percentage	FT%	Free throw percentage
RPG	Rebounds per game	APG	Assists per game	SPG	Steals per game
BPG	Blocks per game	PPG	Points per game	**Bold**	Career high
*	Led the league

=== NBA ===
==== Regular season ====
Year	Team	GP	GS	MPG	FG%	3P%	FT%	RPG	APG	SPG	BPG	PPG
2022–23	New Orleans	59	11	17.7	.418	.314	**.650**	3.2	2.3	.7	.2	3.8
2023–24	New Orleans	61	16	22.3	.447	.311	.642	3.9	2.7	1.4	.4	5.8
2024–25	Atlanta	**76**	**76**	**33.8**	.493	**.340**	.593	5.9	4.4	**3.0***	**.7**	**14.1**
2025–26	Atlanta	**76**	**76**	33.2	**.517**	.188	.615	**6.8**	**5.9**	2.0	.4	11.9
Career		272	179	27.5	.488	.298	.614	5.1	4.0	1.9	.4	9.4

==== Playoffs ====
Year	Team	GP	GS	MPG	FG%	3P%	FT%	RPG	APG	SPG	BPG	PPG
2024	New Orleans	3	0	5.7	.333	.000	–	.7	.0	.7	.0	1.3
2026	Atlanta	**6**	**6**	**27.7**	**.439**	**.286**	**.667**	**6.2**	**5.0**	**1.8**	**.3**	**7.3**
Career		9	6	20.3	.426	.250	.667	4.3	3.3	1.4	.2	5.3

== Personal life ==
Daniels' father, Ricky Daniels, is from the United States and played college basketball for the NC State Wolfpack before embarking on a professional career. He was a two-time South East Australian Basketball League MVP with the Bendigo Braves, and his number was retired by the team. Daniels' older brother, Kai, plays college basketball at Regis University. His younger brother, Dash, is an NBL Next Star player with South East Melbourne Phoenix. Daniels has been nicknamed "The Great Barrier Thief" by former Atlanta Hawks teammate Larry Nance Jr.

== See also ==
- List of NBA annual steals leaders
- List of NBA single-season steals per game leaders
