= Kira Lewis Jr. =

American basketball player (born 2001)

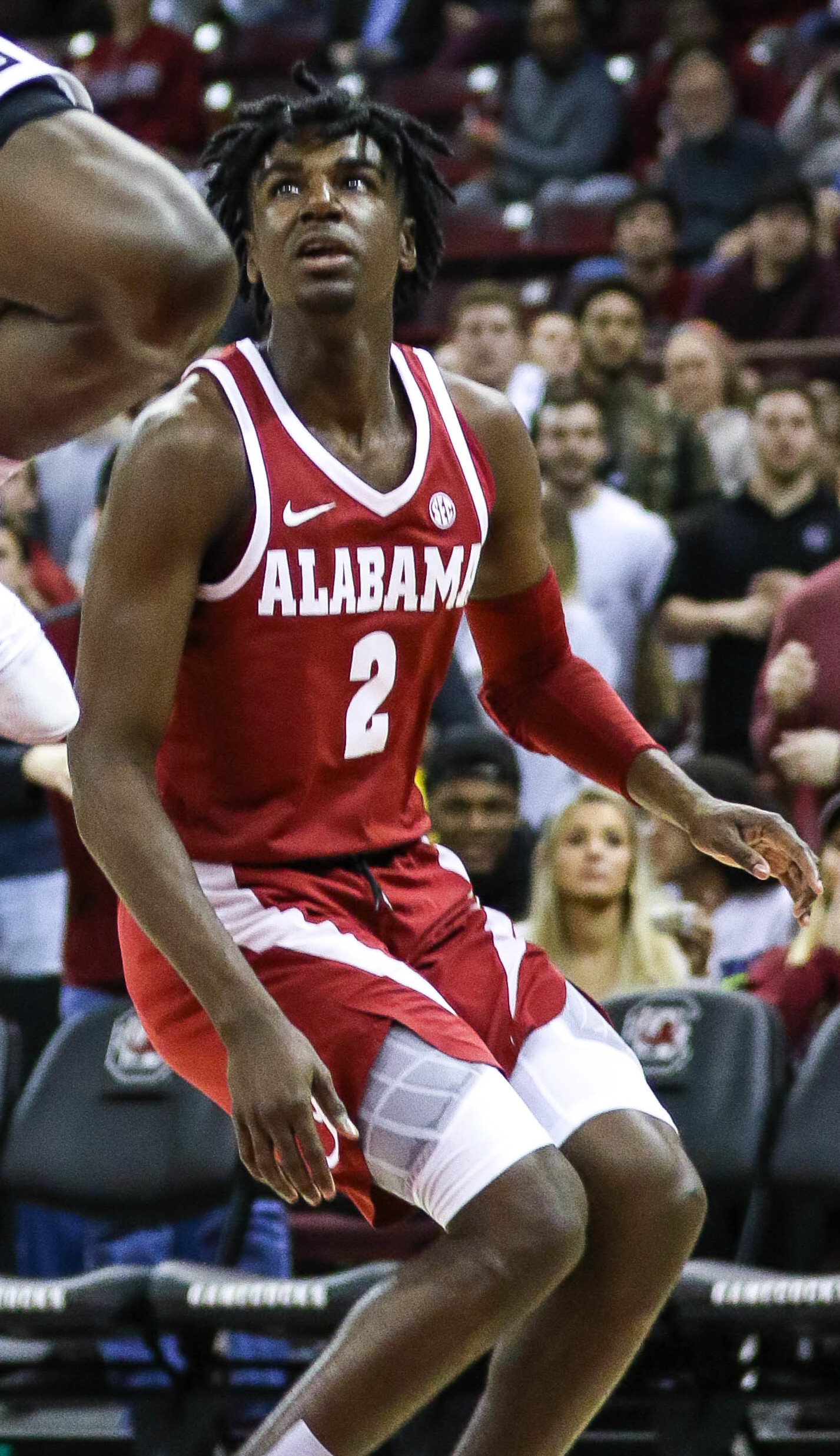
- Lewis with Alabama in 2019

No. 3 – Memphis Hustle
- Position: Point guard
- League: NBA G League

Personal information
- Born: April 6, 2001 (age 25) Meridianville, Alabama, U.S.
- Listed height: 6 ft 1 in (1.85 m)
- Listed weight: 170 lb (77 kg)

Career information
- High school: Hazel Green (Hazel Green, Alabama)
- College: Alabama (2018–2020)
- NBA draft: 2020: 1st round, 13th overall pick
- Drafted by: New Orleans Pelicans
- Playing career: 2020–present

Career history
- 2020–2024: New Orleans Pelicans
- 2022–2024: →Birmingham Squadron
- 2024: Toronto Raptors
- 2024: →Raptors 905
- 2024: Utah Jazz
- 2024–2025: Capital City Go-Go
- 2025–2026: Wisconsin Herd
- 2026–present: Memphis Hustle

Career highlights
- First-team All-SEC (2020); SEC All-Freshman Team (2019)
- Stats at NBA.com
- Stats at Basketball Reference
Medals
Men's basketball
Representing United States
FIBA Under-19 World Cup
Gold medal – first place	2019 Greece	Team

Kira Aundrea Lewis Jr. (/ˈkaɪrə/ KY-rə; born April 6, 2001) is an American professional basketball player for the Memphis Hustle of the NBA G League. He played college basketball for the Alabama Crimson Tide and was drafted by the New Orleans Pelicans in the first round of the 2020 NBA draft.

== High school career ==
Lewis played basketball for Hazel Green High School in Hazel Green, Alabama for three years. As a junior, he averaged 28.5 points, 5.9 rebounds, 4.5 assists, and 3.9 steals per game and led his team to the Alabama Class 6A semifinals. Lewis earned first-team All-State honors for his second consecutive season, was a finalist for Alabama Mr. Basketball, and was named Huntsville Region Player of the Year and Alabama Class 6A Player of the Year. He was originally in the 2019 class but graduated early from high school and reclassified to 2018. On August 10, 2018, Lewis committed to Alabama over several major NCAA Division I offers, including from Indiana and Kansas. He was considered a four-star recruit by ESPN and 247Sports.

== College career ==
In his freshman season with Alabama, Lewis, at age 17, was the second-youngest player in NCAA Division I basketball behind Everett Perrot of Pepperdine and was the youngest player to appear in a game. Lewis scored six points in his first career game versus Southern. The following game, he had 21 points against Appalachian State and followed that up with a season-high 24 points against Wichita State. He tied his season high of 24 points against Georgia in February 2019. Lewis averaged 13.5 points, 2.9 assists, and 2.6 rebounds per game and was named to the SEC All-Freshman Team. However, Alabama struggled and finished 18–16, losing in the first round of the NIT. Lewis entered the transfer portal before new coach Nate Oats convinced him to return.

In his sophomore season opener, Lewis scored a then-career-high 30 points in an 81–80 loss to Penn. He scored a career-high 37 points on February 8, 2020, in a 105–102 overtime win against Georgia. On February 12, Lewis became the first Alabama player since 1996 to record a triple-double, posting 10 points, 10 rebounds and 13 assists in a 95–91 overtime loss to Auburn. He became the second player in school history to reach this accomplishment. On February 25, Lewis contributed 29 points, seven rebounds, and four assists in an 80–73 loss to Mississippi State. At the conclusion of the regular season, Lewis was named to the First Team All-SEC. As a sophomore, Lewis averaged 18.5 points, 4.8 rebounds, and 5.2 assists per game. After the season, Lewis declared for the 2020 NBA draft.

== Professional career ==
=== New Orleans Pelicans (2020–2024) ===
Lewis was selected with the 13th pick in the 2020 NBA draft by the New Orleans Pelicans. On November 30, 2020, he signed with the Pelicans. Lewis was a rotational player to start the year. His first career game with double-digit scoring came January 13, 2021 against the Los Angeles Clippers. He had 10 points that game. He registered a career-high 16 points and 6 assists on March 23 against the Los Angeles Lakers.

On December 8, 2021, Lewis tore his ACL and sprained his MCL during a 114–120 overtime loss to the Denver Nuggets, ending his season.

=== Toronto Raptors (2024) ===
On January 17, 2024, Lewis and a 2024 second-round pick were traded by the Pelicans to the Indiana Pacers in exchange for cash considerations, before being traded to the Toronto Raptors, along with Bruce Brown, Jordan Nwora and three first-round picks in exchange for Pascal Siakam. On January 19, 2024, the Raptors assigned Lewis to the Raptors 905 of the NBA G League.

=== Utah Jazz (2024) ===
After playing only two minutes in one game with the Raptors, Lewis was traded to the Utah Jazz alongside Otto Porter Jr. and a 2024 first-round pick in exchange for Kelly Olynyk and Ochai Agbaji.

=== Capital City Go-Go (2024–2025) ===
Lewis joined the Houston Rockets for the 2024 NBA Summer League. On September 29, 2024, Lewis signed with the Washington Wizards, but was waived on October 12. On October 28, he joined the Capital City Go-Go.

Lewis joined the Miami Heat for the 2025 NBA Summer League.

=== Wisconsin Herd (2025–2026) ===
On November 7, 2025, Lewis was named to the Wisconsin Herd opening night roster.

=== Memphis Hustle (2026–present) ===
On September 29, 2026, the Memphis Hustle acquired the returning player rights to Lewis.

== National team career ==
Lewis played for the United States at the 2019 FIBA Under-19 World Cup in Heraklion, Greece. He averaged four points and 1.6 assists per game and helped his team win a gold medal.

== Career statistics ==
Legend
GP	Games played	GS	Games started	MPG	Minutes per game
FG%	Field goal percentage	3P%	3-point field goal percentage	FT%	Free throw percentage
RPG	Rebounds per game	APG	Assists per game	SPG	Steals per game
BPG	Blocks per game	PPG	Points per game	**Bold**	Career high

=== NBA ===
==== Regular season ====
Year	Team	GP	GS	MPG	FG%	3P%	FT%	RPG	APG	SPG	BPG	PPG
2020–21	New Orleans	**54**	0	**16.7**	.386	.333	.843	1.3	**2.3**	**.7**	**.2**	**6.4**
2021–22	New Orleans	24	0	14.2	.404	.224	.833	**1.6**	2.0	.5	.0	5.9
2022–23	New Orleans	25	0	9.4	**.455**	**.441**	.864	1.3	.9	.4	.1	4.6
2023–24	New Orleans	15	0	9.6	.308	.100	**.909**	.9	1.2	.3	.1	2.9
2023–24	Toronto	1	0	1.6	—	—	—	.0	.0	.0	.0	.0
2023–24	Utah	12	0	9.9	.450	.154	.778	1.0	1.6	.3	.1	3.8
Career		131	0	13.3	.397	.294	.848	1.3	1.8	.5	.1	5.2

=== College ===
Year	Team	GP	GS	MPG	FG%	3P%	FT%	RPG	APG	SPG	BPG	PPG
2018–19	Alabama	**34**	**34**	31.6	.433	.358	.783	2.6	2.9	.8	.3	13.5
2019–20	Alabama	31	31	**37.6**	**.459**	**.366**	**.802**	**4.8**	**5.2**	**1.8**	**.6**	**18.5**
Career		65	65	34.5	.447	.362	.793	3.6	4.0	1.3	.4	15.9
