= E. J. Liddell =

American basketball player (born 2000)

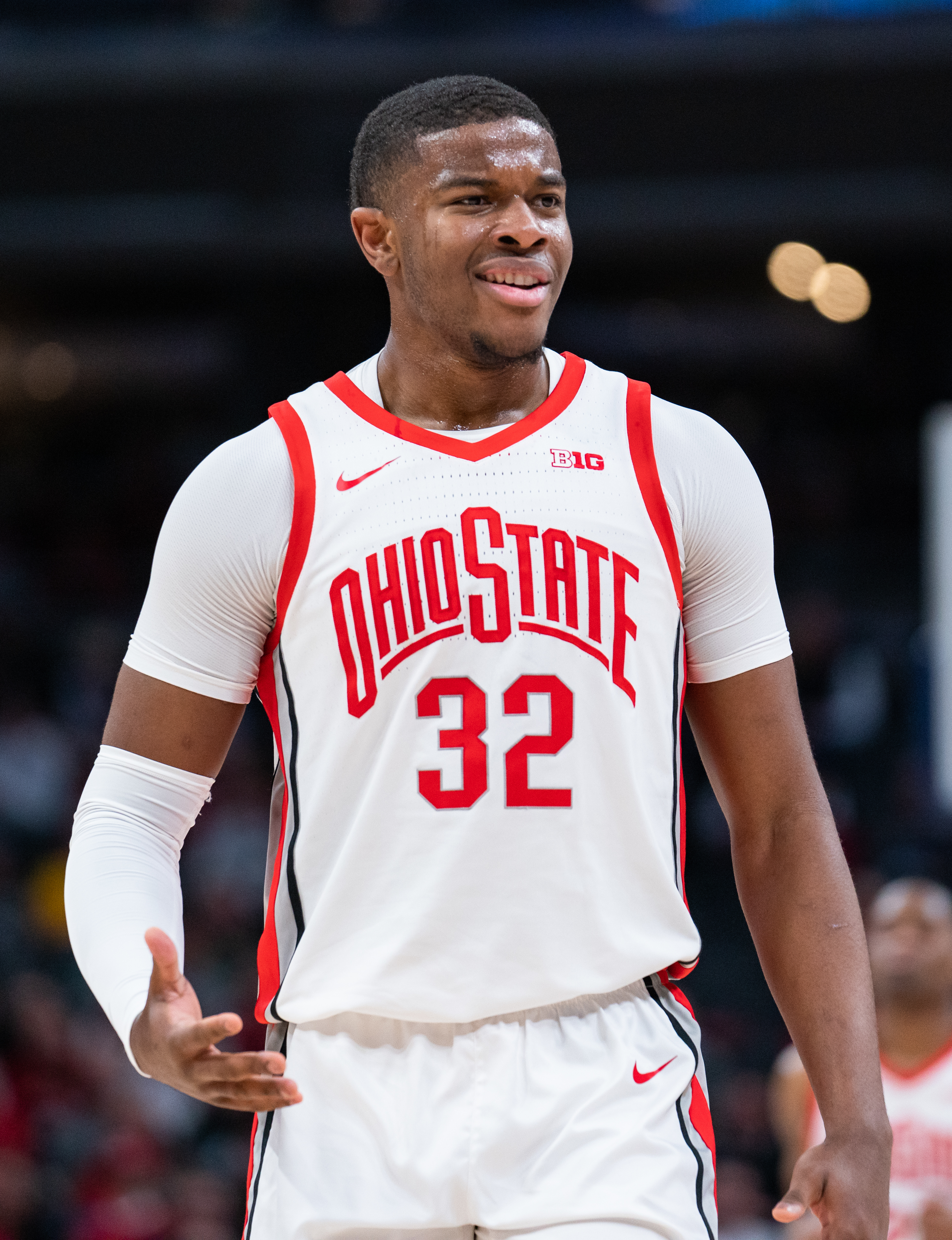
- Liddell with Ohio State in 2022

No. 32 – Aris Thessaloniki
- Position: Power forward / small forward
- League: GBL; EuroCup

Personal information
- Born: December 18, 2000 (age 25) Belleville, Illinois, U.S.
- Listed height: 6 ft 6 in (1.98 m)
- Listed weight: 240 lb (109 kg)

Career information
- High school: Belleville West (Belleville, Illinois)
- College: Ohio State (2019–2022)
- NBA draft: 2022: 2nd round, 41st overall pick
- Drafted by: New Orleans Pelicans
- Playing career: 2022–present

Career history
- 2022–2024: New Orleans Pelicans
- 2023–2024: →Birmingham Squadron
- 2024–2025: Chicago Bulls
- 2024–2025: →Windy City Bulls
- 2025–2026: Brooklyn Nets
- 2025–2026: →Long Island Nets
- 2026–present: Aris Thessaloniki

Career highlights
- Third-team All-American – AP, USBWA, NABC, SN (2022); First-team All-Big Ten – Media (2022); 2× First-team All-Big Ten – Coaches (2021, 2022); Big Ten All-Defensive Team (2022); Second-team All-Big Ten – Media (2021); 2× Illinois Mr. Basketball (2018, 2019)
- Stats at NBA.com
- Stats at Basketball Reference

Eric "E. J." Liddell Jr. (/lɪˈdɛl/ lih-DEL); born December 18, 2000) is an American professional basketball player for Aris Thessaloniki of the Greek Basketball League (GBL) and the EuroCup. He played college basketball for the Ohio State Buckeyes.

== Early life ==
Liddell was raised in Belleville, Illinois, and went to high school at Belleville High School-West. He averaged 20.8 points and 8.2 rebounds per game as a junior, won the 2018 Illinois Mr. Basketball award, shared the 2018 St. Louis Post Dispatch Player of the Year with Courtney Ramey, and won the Illinois 4A class state championship. As a senior, he averaged 20.2 points, 9.3 rebounds and 3.8 blocks per game. For the second year in a row, he won Illinois Mr. Basketball, the St. Louis Post Dispatch Player of the Year, and the Illinois 4A class state championship.

Liddell was a consensus four-star recruit and ranked the best player in the state of Illinois. On October 1, 2018, Liddell committed to playing college basketball for Ohio State over scholarship offers from teams such as Illinois, Missouri, and Wisconsin.

College recruiting
Name	Hometown	School	Height	Weight	Commit date
E. J. Liddell; PF	Belleville, IL	Belleville West (IL)	6 ft 7 in (2.01 m)	220 lb (100 kg)	Oct 1, 2018
E. J. Liddell; PF	Recruit ratings: Rivals: 247Sports: ESPN: (89)				
Overall recruit ranking: Rivals: 41 247Sports: 60 ESPN: 38
Note: In many cases, Scout, Rivals, 247Sports, On3, and ESPN may conflict in their listings of height and weight.; In these cases, the average was taken. ESPN grades are on a 100-point scale.; Sources: "Ohio State 2019 Basketball Commitments". Rivals.; "2019 Ohio State Buckeyes Recruiting Class". ESPN.; "2019 Team Ranking". Rivals.

== College career ==
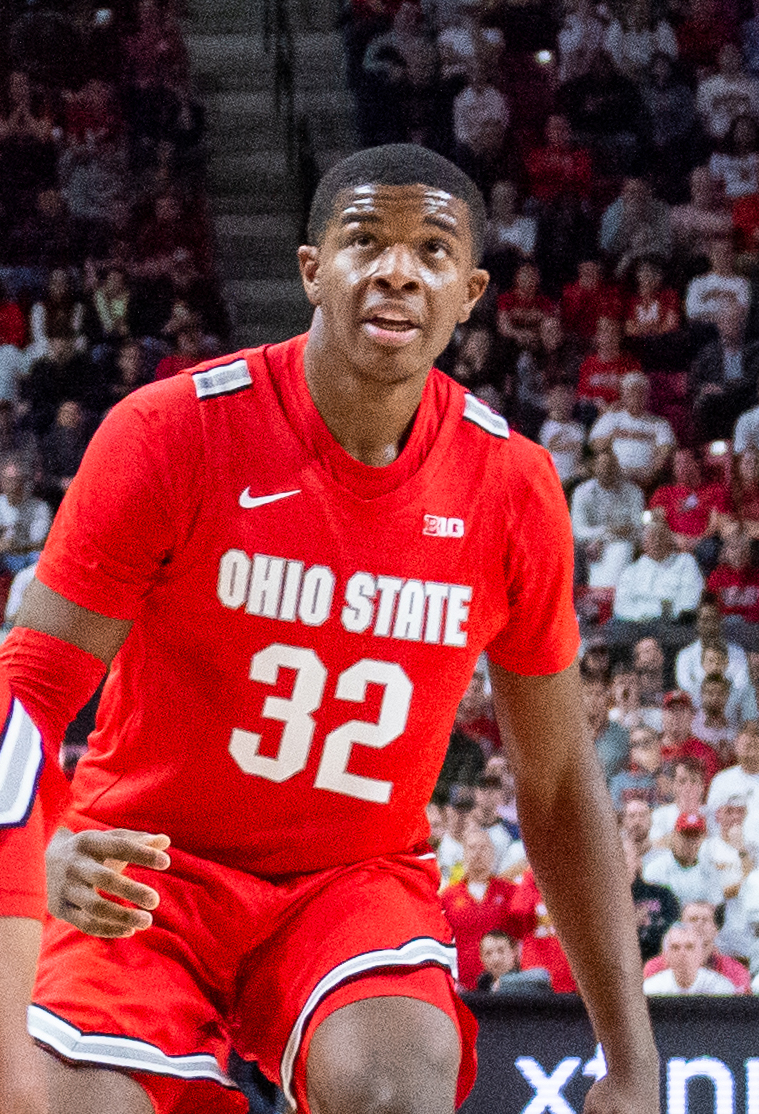
Liddell with Ohio State in 2020

Liddell came off the bench during his freshman year, averaging 6.7 points and 3.8 rebounds per game. He played in all 31 games and was second on the team with 29 blocks. He had a double-double in a win against Illinois.

During the early parts of his sophomore season, he contracted mononucleosis, which led to Liddell being out for several games. He had another good game against Illinois during his sophomore year, scoring a season-high 26 points in a win. Liddell averaged 16.2 points, 6.7 rebounds, and 1.1 blocks per game during his sophomore season. After Ohio State's Round of 64 loss to Oral Roberts, Liddell received threats from basketball fans via social media. After he posted screenshots of the threats on Twitter, Ohio State reached out to law enforcement regarding the threats.

On March 31, 2021, Liddell declared for the 2021 NBA draft while maintaining his college eligibility. He later withdrew from the draft and announced that would return to Ohio State for his junior season. On January 9, 2022, Liddell scored a career-high 34 points in a 95–87 win against Northwestern. He was named first-team All-Big Ten. As a junior, he averaged 19.4 points, 7.9 rebounds, 2.5 assists and 2.6 blocks per game. On March 25, 2022, Liddell declared for the 2022 NBA draft, forgoing his remaining college eligibility.

== Professional career ==
=== New Orleans Pelicans / Birmingham Squadron (2022–2024) ===
Liddell was drafted in the second round of the 2022 NBA draft by the New Orleans Pelicans. During an NBA Summer League game against the Atlanta Hawks on July 11, 2022, Liddell suffered a torn ACL. On October 16, he signed a two-way contract with the Pelicans.

On July 6, 2023, Liddell signed a multi-year deal with the New Orleans Pelicans.

On July 6, 2024, Liddell, Dyson Daniels, Larry Nance Jr., Cody Zeller (via sign-and-trade), a 2025 first-round pick (via Lakers), and a conditional 2027 first-round pick were traded to the Atlanta Hawks in exchange for Dejounte Murray. On July 29, he was subsequently traded to the Phoenix Suns in exchange for David Roddy and on August 27, he was waived by Phoenix.

=== Chicago / Windy City Bulls (2024–2025) ===
On September 7, 2024, Liddell signed with the Chicago Bulls, with the Bulls later converting his deal to a two-way contract on October 19. Liddell made 12 total appearances for Chicago during the 2024–25 NBA season, recording averages of 1.8 points, 0.8 rebounds, and 0.3 assists.

=== Brooklyn / Long Island Nets (2025–2026) ===
On September 3, 2025, the Brooklyn Nets signed Liddell to a two-way contract. On April 7, 2026, Liddell recorded a career-high 21 points on 7-of-9 shooting during a 96–90 victory over the Milwaukee Bucks. In 26 appearances (including nine starts) for Brooklyn during the 2025–26 season, he averaged 5.7 points, 2.7 rebounds, and 0.9 assists.

=== Aris Thessaloniki (2026–present) ===
On June 17, 2026, Liddell signed with Aris Thessaloniki of the Greek Basketball League (GBL) and the EuroCup.

== Career statistics ==
Legend
GP	Games played	GS	Games started	MPG	Minutes per game
FG%	Field goal percentage	3P%	3-point field goal percentage	FT%	Free throw percentage
RPG	Rebounds per game	APG	Assists per game	SPG	Steals per game
BPG	Blocks per game	PPG	Points per game	**Bold**	Career high

=== NBA ===
==== Regular season ====
Year	Team	GP	GS	MPG	FG%	3P%	FT%	RPG	APG	SPG	BPG	PPG
2023–24	New Orleans	8	0	2.9	.167	.000	**1.000**	.6	.1	**.3**	.3	.5
2024–25	Chicago	12	0	4.4	**.533**	.300	**1.000**	.8	.3	.1	.1	1.8
2025–26	Brooklyn	**26**	**5**	**13.4**	.486	**.346**	.808	**2.7**	**.9**	.2	**.4**	**5.7**
Career		46	5	9.2	.477	.313	.833	1.8	.6	.2	.3	3.7

==== Playoffs ====
Year	Team	GP	GS	MPG	FG%	3P%	FT%	RPG	APG	SPG	BPG	PPG
2024	New Orleans	1	0	2.5	—	—	—	1.0	.0	.0	.0	.0
Career		1	0	2.5	—	—	—	1.0	.0	.0	.0	.0

=== College ===
Year	Team	GP	GS	MPG	FG%	3P%	FT%	RPG	APG	SPG	BPG	PPG
2019–20	Ohio State	31	0	16.6	.464	.192	.718	3.8	.5	.4	.9	6.7
2020–21	Ohio State	29	29	29.4	.474	.338	.746	6.7	1.8	**.7**	1.1	16.2
2021–22	Ohio State	**32**	**32**	**33.2**	**.490**	**.374**	**.765**	**7.9**	**2.5**	.6	**2.6**	**19.4**
Career		92	61	26.4	.480	.341	.749	6.1	1.6	.5	1.6	14.1
