= 2024–25 Houston Rockets season =

- Division champions
- Head coach: Ime Udoka
- President: Gretchen Sheirr
- General manager: Rafael Stone
- Owner: Tilman Fertitta
- Arena: Toyota Center

Results
- Record: 52–30 (.634)
- Place: Division: 1st (Southwest); Conference: 2nd (Western)
- Playoff finish: First round (lost to Warriors 3–4)
- Stats at Basketball Reference

Local media
- Television: Space City Home Network
- Radio: Sportstalk 790

The 2024–25 Houston Rockets season was the 58th season of the franchise in the National Basketball Association (NBA), and 54th season in the city of Houston. After starting the regular season out 3–3, the Rockets would start to showcase serious improvements in their production to the point of becoming one of the best teams in the Western Conference throughout the season.

The Rockets also won West Group A in the 2024 NBA Cup with a 3–1 record and advanced to the knockout stage. They defeated the Golden State Warriors in the quarterfinals, but were eliminated by the Oklahoma City Thunder in the semifinals.

On April 2, 2025, the Rockets clinched their first playoff berth and Southwest Division title since 2020. They finished the regular season with a 52–30 record, placing 2nd in the West. This marked an 11-game improvement over the previous season. In the first round of the playoffs, the Rockets faced the 7th-seeded Golden State Warriors. Despite going down 3–1 in the series, they ended up winning the next two games to force a Game 7. Despite mounting a near-comeback, they could not keep their momentum and got blown out in Game 7 by a final score of 103-89, ending their season.

The Houston Rockets drew an average home attendance of 17,482, the 19th-highest of all NBA teams.

== Draft ==
Round	Pick	Player	Position	Nationality	College / Club
1	3	Reed Sheppard	SG	United States	Kentucky
2	44	Pelle Larsson	SG	Sweden	Arizona

The Rockets entered the draft (which was two days long instead of one day like it previously had been since the NBA draft was shortened down to two rounds in 1989) with a first-round pick and a second-round pick, both acquired through previous trades. The Rockets had traded their original selections to the Oklahoma City Thunder in separate trades; the original second-round pick was eventually held by the Charlotte Hornets on draft night.

== Roster ==
2024–25 Houston Rockets roster
Players

Pos.	No.	Player	Height	Weight	DOB	From
C	12	Steven Adams	6 ft 11 in (2.11 m)	265 lb (120 kg)	1993-07-20	Pittsburgh
G/F	9	Dillon Brooks	6 ft 6 in (1.98 m)	225 lb (102 kg)	1996-01-22	Oregon
C	3	N'Faly Dante (TW)	6 ft 11 in (2.11 m)	230 lb (104 kg)	2001-10-19	Oregon
F	17	Tari Eason	6 ft 8 in (2.03 m)	215 lb (98 kg)	2001-05-10	LSU
G	4	Jalen Green	6 ft 4 in (1.93 m)	186 lb (84 kg)	2002-02-09	Prolific Prep (CA)
F	32	Jeff Green	6 ft 8 in (2.03 m)	235 lb (107 kg)	1986-08-28	Georgetown
G	0	Aaron Holiday	6 ft 0 in (1.83 m)	185 lb (84 kg)	1996-09-30	UCLA
C	2	Jock Landale (injured)	6 ft 11 in (2.11 m)	255 lb (116 kg)	1995-10-25	Saint Mary's
F	58	Jack McVeigh (TW)	6 ft 8 in (2.03 m)	215 lb (98 kg)	1996-06-27	Nebraska
F	21	David Roddy (TW)	6 ft 4 in (1.93 m)	255 lb (116 kg)	2001-03-27	Colorado State
C	28	Alperen Şengün	6 ft 11 in (2.11 m)	243 lb (110 kg)	2002-07-25	Turkey
G	15	Reed Sheppard	6 ft 2 in (1.88 m)	185 lb (84 kg)	2004-06-24	Kentucky
F	10	Jabari Smith Jr.	6 ft 10 in (2.08 m)	220 lb (100 kg)	2003-05-13	Auburn
F	8	Jae'Sean Tate (injured)	6 ft 4 in (1.93 m)	230 lb (104 kg)	1995-10-28	Ohio State
G/F	1	Amen Thompson	6 ft 7 in (2.01 m)	200 lb (91 kg)	2003-01-30	Pine Crest (FL)
G	5	Fred VanVleet	6 ft 0 in (1.83 m)	197 lb (89 kg)	1994-02-25	Wichita State
F	7	Cam Whitmore	6 ft 7 in (2.01 m)	230 lb (104 kg)	2004-07-08	Villanova
G/F	19	Nate Williams	6 ft 5 in (1.96 m)	205 lb (93 kg)	1999-02-12	Buffalo

Coaches
Head coach
- Ime Udoka
Assistant(s)
- Will Dunn
- Cam Hodges
- Royal Ivey
- Garrett Jackson
- Mike Moser
- Ben Sullivan

Legend
- (DP) Unsigned draft pick
- (FA) Free agent
- (S) Suspended
- (GL) On assignment to G League affiliate
- (TW) Two-way affiliate player
- Injured

Roster
Updated: May 1, 2025

== Standings ==
=== Division ===
Southwest Division	W	L	PCT	GB	Home	Road	Div	GP
y – Houston Rockets	52	30	.634	–	29‍–‍12	23‍–‍18	13‍–‍3	82
x – Memphis Grizzlies	48	34	.585	4.0	26‍–‍15	22‍–‍19	11‍–‍5	82
pi – Dallas Mavericks	39	43	.476	13.0	22‍–‍18	17‍–‍25	8‍–‍8	82
San Antonio Spurs	34	48	.415	18.0	20‍–‍21	14‍–‍27	5‍–‍11	82
New Orleans Pelicans	21	61	.256	31.0	14‍–‍27	7‍–‍34	3‍–‍13	82

=== Conference ===
Western Conference
#	Team	W	L	PCT	GB	GP
1	z – Oklahoma City Thunder *	68	14	.829	–	82
2	y – Houston Rockets *	52	30	.634	16.0	82
3	y – Los Angeles Lakers *	50	32	.610	18.0	82
4	x – Denver Nuggets	50	32	.610	18.0	82
5	x – Los Angeles Clippers	50	32	.610	18.0	82
6	x – Minnesota Timberwolves	49	33	.598	19.0	82
7	x – Golden State Warriors	48	34	.585	20.0	82
8	x – Memphis Grizzlies	48	34	.585	20.0	82
9	pi – Sacramento Kings	40	42	.488	28.0	82
10	pi – Dallas Mavericks	39	43	.476	29.0	82
11	Phoenix Suns	36	46	.439	32.0	82
12	Portland Trail Blazers	36	46	.439	32.0	82
13	San Antonio Spurs	34	48	.415	34.0	82
14	New Orleans Pelicans	21	61	.256	47.0	82
15	Utah Jazz	17	65	.207	51.0	82

== Game log ==
=== Preseason ===
2024 preseason game log
Total: 3–1 (Home: 2–0; Road: 1–1)
Preseason: 3–1 (home: 2–0; road: 1–1)

Game	Date	Team	Score	High points	High rebounds	High assists	Location Attendance	Record
1	October 7	@ Utah	L 113–122	Jalen Green (21)	Jabari Smith Jr. (5)	Fred VanVleet (8)	Delta Center; 14,288	0–1
2	October 9	@ Oklahoma City	W 122–113 (OT)	Alperen Şengün (17)	Alperen Şengün (9)	Cam Whitmore (4)	Paycom Center	1–1
3	October 15	New Orleans	W 118–98	Jalen Green (19)	Steven Adams (11)	Fred VanVleet (9)	Toyota Center; 15,528	2–1
4	October 17	San Antonio	W 129–107	Jalen Green (30)	Alperen Şengün (10)	Fred VanVleet (5)	Toyota Center; 16,424	3–1

2024–25 preseason schedule

=== Regular season ===
2024–25 game log
Total: 52–30 (Home: 29–12; Road: 23–18)
October: 3–2 (home: 1–1; road: 2–1)

Game	Date	Team	Score	High points	High rebounds	High assists	Location Attendance	Record
1	October 23	Charlotte	L 105–110	Jalen Green (28)	Alperen Şengün (18)	Fred VanVleet (6)	Toyota Center; 18,055	0–1
2	October 25	Memphis	W 128–108	Jalen Green (22)	Jabari Smith Jr. (16)	Ja. Green, Smith Jr. (4)	Toyota Center; 18,055	1–1
3	October 26	@ San Antonio	L 106–109	Jalen Green (29)	Jabari Smith Jr. (7)	Fred VanVleet (7)	Frost Bank Center; 18,715	1–2
4	October 28	@ San Antonio	W 106–101	Jalen Green (36)	Alperen Şengün (12)	Fred VanVleet (9)	Frost Bank Center; 17,519	2–2
5	October 31	@ Dallas	W 108–102	Jalen Green (23)	Ja. Green, Şengün (12)	Ja. Green, Şengün, VanVleet (4)	American Airlines Center; 20,011	3–2

November : 11–4 (home: 7–2; road: 4–2)

Game	Date	Team	Score	High points	High rebounds	High assists	Location Attendance	Record
6	November 2	Golden State	L 121–127 (OT)	Tari Eason (27)	Amen Thompson (11)	Fred VanVleet (5)	Toyota Center; 18,055	3–3
7	November 4	New York	W 109–97	Alperen Şengün (25)	Alperen Şengün (14)	Şengün, VanVleet (5)	Toyota Center; 16,417	4–3
8	November 6	San Antonio	W 127–100	Ja. Green, VanVleet (21)	Fred VanVleet (7)	Fred VanVleet (10)	Toyota Center; 16,208	5–3
9	November 8	@ Oklahoma City	L 107–126	Dillon Brooks (17)	Alperen Şengün (9)	Alperen Şengün (6)	Paycom Center; 18,203	5–4
10	November 10	@ Detroit	W 101–99	Alperen Şengün (27)	Alperen Şengün (10)	Fred VanVleet (7)	Little Caesars Arena; 18,744	6–4
11	November 11	Washington	W 107–92	Alperen Şengün (27)	Alperen Şengün (17)	Brooks, Şengün (3)	Toyota Center; 15,998	7–4
12	November 13	L.A. Clippers	W 111–103	Jalen Green (21)	Şengün, Thompson (11)	Alperen Şengün (6)	Toyota Center; 16,493	8–4
13	November 15	L.A. Clippers	W 125–104	Jabari Smith Jr. (28)	Jabari Smith Jr. (11)	Şengün, VanVleet (10)	Toyota Center; 18,055	9–4
14	November 17	@ Chicago	W 143–107	Fred VanVleet (28)	Şengün, Thompson (11)	Alperen Şengün (11)	United Center; 20,667	10–4
15	November 18	@ Milwaukee	L 100–101	Fred VanVleet (26)	Tari Eason (14)	Şengün, VanVleet (5)	Fiserv Forum; 17,341	10–5
16	November 20	Indiana	W 130–113	Alperen Şengün (31)	Alperen Şengün (12)	Fred VanVleet (6)	Toyota Center; 16,087	11–5
17	November 22	Portland	W 116–88	Dillon Brooks (28)	Amen Thompson (11)	Fred VanVleet (8)	Toyota Center; 15,546	12–5
18	November 23	Portland	L 98–104	Alperen Şengün (22)	Jabari Smith Jr. (8)	Şengün, VanVleet (5)	Toyota Center; 16,102	12–6
19	November 26	@ Minnesota	W 117–111 (OT)	Fred VanVleet (27)	Alperen Şengün (10)	Şengün, VanVleet (11)	Target Center; 18,978	13–6
20	November 27	@ Philadelphia	W 122–115 (OT)	Jalen Green (41)	Alperen Şengün (14)	Alperen Şengün (7)	Wells Fargo Center; 19,765	14–6

December : 7–5 (home: 3–2; road: 4–3)

Game	Date	Team	Score	High points	High rebounds	High assists	Location Attendance	Record
21	December 1	Oklahoma City	W 119–116	Fred VanVleet (38)	Şengün, Smith Jr. (14)	Alperen Şengün (9)	Toyota Center; 18,055	15–6
22	December 3	@ Sacramento	L 111–120	Jalen Green (28)	Tari Eason (12)	Alperen Şengün (6)	Golden 1 Center; 15,019	15–7
23	December 5	@ Golden State	L 93–99	Alperen Şengün (16)	Şengün, Thompson (8)	Şengün, VanVleet (5)	Chase Center; 18,064	15–8
24	December 8	@ L.A. Clippers	W 117–106	Jalen Green (31)	Jabari Smith Jr. (12)	Alperen Şengün (6)	Intuit Dome; 14,782	16–8
25	December 11	Golden State	W 91–90	Alperen Şengün (26)	Alperen Şengün (11)	Fred VanVleet (7)	Toyota Center; 18,055	17–8
26	December 14	@ Oklahoma City	L 96–111	Amen Thompson (19)	Alperen Şengün (11)	Fred VanVleet (7)	T-Mobile Arena; 17,937	17–9
27	December 19	New Orleans	W 133–113	Jalen Green (34)	Alperen Şengün (9)	Fred VanVleet (9)	Toyota Center; 18,055	18–9
28	December 22	@ Toronto	W 114–110	Dillon Brooks (27)	Alperen Şengün (10)	Şengün, VanVleet (5)	Scotiabank Arena; 19,305	19–9
29	December 23	@ Charlotte	W 114–101	Jabari Smith Jr. (21)	Smith Jr., Thompson (11)	Fred VanVleet (6)	Spectrum Center; 19,134	20–9
30	December 26	@ New Orleans	W 128–111	Jalen Green (30)	Alperen Şengün (13)	Alperen Şengün (6)	Smoothie King Center; 16,052	21–9
31	December 27	Minnesota	L 112–113	Alperen Şengün (38)	Alperen Şengün (12)	Fred VanVleet (7)	Toyota Center; 18,055	21–10
32	December 29	Miami	L 100–104	Dillon Brooks (22)	Alperen Şengün (18)	Şengün, VanVleet (6)	Toyota Center; 18,055	21–11

January : 11–4 (home: 4–2; road: 7–2)

Game	Date	Team	Score	High points	High rebounds	High assists	Location Attendance	Record
33	January 1	Dallas	W 110–99	Alperen Şengün (23)	Brooks, Şengün (6)	Fred VanVleet (7)	Toyota Center; 18,055	22–11
34	January 3	Boston	L 86–109	Jalen Green (27)	Alperen Şengün (7)	Şengün, VanVleet (3)	Toyota Center; 18,055	22–12
35	January 5	L.A. Lakers	W 119–115	Jalen Green (33)	Amen Thompson (16)	Ja. Green, Şengün (4)	Toyota Center; 18,055	23–12
36	January 7	@ Washington	W 135–112	Jalen Green (29)	Amen Thompson (15)	Fred VanVleet (12)	Capital One Arena; 12,930	24–12
37	January 9	@ Memphis	W 119–115	Alperen Şengün (32)	Alperen Şengün (14)	Şengün, Thompson (5)	FedExForum; 16,298	25–12
—	January 11	@ Atlanta	Postponed due to a winter storm, rescheduled to January 28.					
38	January 13	Memphis	W 120–118	Jalen Green (42)	Amen Thompson (13)	Fred VanVleet (9)	Toyota Center; 18,055	26–12
39	January 15	@ Denver	W 128–108	Jalen Green (34)	Şengün, Thompson, Whitmore (9)	Şengün, VanVleet (8)	Ball Arena; 19,837	27–12
40	January 16	@ Sacramento	L 127–132	Jalen Green (28)	Şengün, Thompson (10)	Amen Thompson (5)	Golden 1 Center; 18,227	27–13
41	January 18	@ Portland	W 125–103	Jalen Green (26)	Alperen Şengün (15)	Alperen Şengün (6)	Moda Center; 17,077	28–13
42	January 20	Detroit	L 96–107	Fred VanVleet (20)	Alperen Şengün (8)	Şengün, Thompson (5)	Toyota Center; 18,055	28–14
43	January 22	Cleveland	W 109–108	Fred VanVleet (26)	Amen Thompson (16)	Ja. Green, VanVleet (5)	Toyota Center; 16,719	29–14
44	January 25	@ Cleveland	W 135–131	Ja. Green, Şengün (26)	Amen Thompson (15)	Amen Thompson (10)	Rocket Mortgage FieldHouse; 19,432	30–14
45	January 27	@ Boston	W 114–112	Dillon Brooks (36)	Şengün, Thompson (9)	Alperen Şengün (9)	TD Garden; 19,156	31–14
46	January 28	@ Atlanta	W 100–96	Jalen Green (25)	Alperen Şengün (10)	Fred VanVleet (6)	State Farm Arena; 15,553	32–14
47	January 30	@ Memphis	L 119–120	Jalen Green (25)	Tari Eason (12)	Ja. Green, VanVleet (5)	FedExForum; 16,257	32–15

February: 5–7 (home: 5–2; road: 0–5)

Game	Date	Team	Score	High points	High rebounds	High assists	Location Attendance	Record
48	February 1	Brooklyn	L 98–110	Jalen Green (29)	Amen Thompson (10)	Amen Thompson (7)	Toyota Center; 18,055	32–16
49	February 3	@ New York	L 118–124	Amen Thompson (25)	Steven Adams (13)	Amen Thompson (11)	Madison Square Garden; 19,812	32–17
50	February 4	@ Brooklyn	L 97–99	Alperen Şengün (24)	Alperen Şengün (20)	Amen Thompson (8)	Barclays Center; 16,564	32–18
51	February 6	@ Minnesota	L 114–127	Jalen Green (28)	Alperen Şengün (10)	Alperen Şengün (7)	Target Center; 18,978	32–19
52	February 8	@ Dallas	L 105–116	Alperen Şengün (30)	Steven Adams (12)	Jalen Green (6)	American Airlines Center; 20,303	32–20
53	February 9	Toronto	W 94–87	Dillon Brooks (19)	Thompson, Landale (10)	Amen Thompson (5)	Toyota Center; 16,829	33–20
54	February 12	Phoenix	W 119–111	Tari Eason (25)	Alperen Şengün (13)	Amen Thompson (11)	Toyota Center; 16,227	34–20
55	February 13	Golden State	L 98–105	Aaron Holiday (25)	Alperen Şengün (13)	Amen Thompson (5)	Toyota Center; 18,055	34–21
All-Star Game
56	February 21	Minnesota	W 121–115	Jalen Green (35)	Alperen Şengün (13)	Amen Thompson (6)	Toyota Center; 18,055	35–21
57	February 22	@ Utah	L 115–124	Alperen Șengün (27)	Alperen Şengün (12)	Jalen Green (10)	Delta Center; 18,175	35–22
58	February 25	Milwaukee	W 100–97	Jalen Green (25)	Alperen Şengün (11)	Amen Thompson (6)	Toyota Center; 18,055	36–22
59	February 26	San Antonio	W 118–106	Amen Thompson (25)	Alperen Şengün (11)	Adams, Thompson (5)	Toyota Center; 18,055	37–22

March : 12–5 (home: 7–2; road: 5–3)

Game	Date	Team	Score	High points	High rebounds	High assists	Location Attendance	Record
60	March 1	Sacramento	L 103–113	Alperen Şengün (30)	Amen Thompson (11)	Şengün, VanVleet (5)	Toyota Center; 18,055	37–23
61	March 3	@ Oklahoma City	L 128–137	Cam Whitmore (27)	Cam Whitmore (11)	Reed Sheppard (5)	Paycom Center; 17,714	37–24
62	March 4	@ Indiana	L 102–115	Alperen Şengün (25)	Tari Eason (14)	Alperen Şengün (7)	Gainbridge Fieldhouse; 15,513	37–25
63	March 6	@ New Orleans	W 109–97	Alperen Şengün (22)	Amen Thompson (11)	Green, Şengün (8)	Smoothie King Center; 17,636	38–25
64	March 8	New Orleans	W 146–117	Dillon Brooks (27)	Amen Thompson (9)	Amen Thompson (11)	Toyota Center; 18,055	39–25
65	March 10	Orlando	W 97–84	Jabari Smith Jr. (20)	Steven Adams (17)	Jalen Green (8)	Toyota Center; 16,665	40–25
66	March 12	Phoenix	W 111–104	Jalen Green (29)	Tari Eason (10)	Alperen Şengün (7)	Toyota Center; 18,055	41–25
67	March 14	Dallas	W 133–96	Tari Eason (30)	Alperen Şengün (15)	Jalen Green (5)	Toyota Center; 16,612	42–25
68	March 15	Chicago	W 117–114	Jalen Green (28)	Alperen Şengün (15)	Fred VanVleet (7)	Toyota Center; 18,055	43–25
69	March 17	Philadelphia	W 144–137 (OT)	Green, Smith Jr. (30)	Alperen Şengün (11)	Jalen Green (13)	Toyota Center; 16,648	44–25
70	March 19	@ Orlando	W 116–108	Jalen Green (26)	Alperen Şengün (12)	Eason, Şengün (4)	Kia Center; 19,609	45–25
71	March 21	@ Miami	W 102–98	Fred VanVleet (37)	Alperen Şengün (10)	Amen Thompson (5)	Kaseya Center; 19,700	46–25
72	March 23	Denver	L 111–116	Jalen Green (30)	Alperen Şengün (14)	Alperen Şengün (10)	Toyota Center; 18,055	46–26
73	March 25	Atlanta	W 121–114	Jalen Green (32)	Tari Eason (14)	Alperen Şengün (5)	Toyota Center; 16,817	47–26
74	March 27	@ Utah	W 121–110	Alperen Şengün (33)	Şengün, Thompson (10)	Green, VanVleet (6)	Delta Center; 18,175	48–26
75	March 30	@ Phoenix	W 148–109	Jalen Green (33)	Amen Thompson (10)	Amen Thompson (9)	PHX Arena; 17,071	49–26
76	March 31	@ L.A. Lakers	L 98–104	Amen Thompson (20)	Alperen Şengün (7)	Fred VanVleet (9)	Crypto.com Arena; 18,997	49–27

April: 3–3 (home: 2–1; road: 1–2)

Game	Date	Team	Score	High points	High rebounds	High assists	Location Attendance	Record
77	April 2	Utah	W 143–105	Jalen Green (22)	Şengün, Smith Jr. (14)	Alperen Şengün (9)	Toyota Center; 18,055	50–27
78	April 4	Oklahoma City	W 125–111	Jalen Green (34)	Jabari Smith Jr. (17)	Thompson, VanVleet (6)	Toyota Center; 18,055	51–27
79	April 6	@ Golden State	W 106–96	Dillon Brooks (24)	Alperen Şengün (14)	Amen Thompson (6)	Chase Center; 18,064	52–27
80	April 9	@ L.A. Clippers	L 117–134	Reed Sheppard (20)	Jock Landale (9)	Jock Landale (5)	Intuit Dome; 17,927	52–28
81	April 11	@ L.A. Lakers	L 109–140	Cam Whitmore (34)	Cam Whitmore (8)	Jeff Green, Sheppard (5)	Crypto.com Arena; 18,997	52–29
82	April 13	Denver	L 111–126	Thompson, VanVleet (15)	Tari Eason (7)	Reed Sheppard (7)	Toyota Center; 18,055	52–30

2024–25 season schedule

=== Playoffs ===
2025 playoff game log
Total: 3–4 (home: 2–2; road: 1–2)
First Round: 3–4 (home: 2–2; road: 1–2)

Game	Date	Team	Score	High points	High rebounds	High assists	Location Attendance	Series
1	April 20	Golden State	L 85–95	Alperen Şengün (26)	Şengün, Thompson (9)	Fred VanVleet (7)	Toyota Center; 18,055	0–1
2	April 23	Golden State	W 109–94	Jalen Green (38)	Alperen Şengün (16)	Alperen Şengün (7)	Toyota Center; 18,055	1–1
3	April 26	@ Golden State	L 93–104	Fred VanVleet (17)	Alperen Şengün (11)	Jalen Green (5)	Chase Center; 18,064	1–2
4	April 28	@ Golden State	L 106–109	Alperen Şengün (31)	Alperen Şengün (10)	Fred VanVleet (6)	Chase Center; 18,064	1–3
5	April 30	Golden State	W 131–116	Fred VanVleet (26)	Alperen Şengün (9)	Alperen Şengün (9)	Toyota Center; 18,055	2–3
6	May 2	@ Golden State	W 115–107	Fred VanVleet (29)	Alperen Şengün (14)	Fred VanVleet (8)	Chase Center; 18,064	3–3
7	May 4	Golden State	L 89–103	Amen Thompson (24)	Alperen Şengün (14)	Alperen Şengün (5)	Toyota Center; 18,055	3–4

2025 playoff schedule

=== NBA Cup ===
The groups were revealed during the tournament announcement on July 12, 2024.

==== West Group A ====
Pos	Team	Pld	W	L	PF	PA	PD	Qualification
1	Houston Rockets	4	3	1	454	414	+40	Advance to knockout stage
2	Los Angeles Clippers	4	2	2	427	411	+16	
3	Minnesota Timberwolves	4	2	2	418	431	−13	
4	Portland Trail Blazers	4	2	2	430	457	−27	
5	Sacramento Kings	4	1	3	429	445	−16	

Source: NBA
Rules for classification: Tiebreakers

== Player statistics ==
Legend
GP	Games played	GS	Games started	MPG	Minutes per game
FG%	Field-goal percentage	3P%	3-point field-goal percentage	FT%	Free-throw percentage
RPG	Rebounds per game	APG	Assists per game	SPG	Steals per game
BPG	Blocks per game	PPG	Points per game

=== Regular season ===
Houston Rockets statistics
Player	GP	GS	MPG	FG%	3P%	FT%	RPG	APG	SPG	BPG	PPG
Steven Adams	58	3	13.7	.545	.000	.462	5.6	1.1	.4	.5	3.9
Dillon Brooks	75	75	31.8	.429	.397	.818	3.7	1.7	.8	.2	14.0
N'Faly Dante	4	0	12.8	.769		.800	5.3	.5	.3	1.3	6.0
Tari Eason	57	16	24.9	.487	.342	.760	6.4	1.5	1.7	.9	12.0
Jalen Green	82	82	32.9	.423	.354	.813	4.6	3.4	.9	.3	21.0
Jeff Green	32	3	12.4	.456	.331	.819	2.3	.9	.2	.4	6.5
Aaron Holiday	62	3	12.8	.437	.398	.829	1.3	1.3	.3	.2	5.5
Jock Landale	42	3	11.9	.533	.423	.675	3.3	.9	.3	.2	4.8
Jack McVeigh	9	0	4.8	.294	.308		.6	.1	.0	.2	1.6
David Roddy^{†}	3	0	11.6	.385	.143	.500	1.7	.7	.0	.3	4.3
Alperen Şengün	76	76	31.5	.496	.233	.692	10.3	4.9	1.1	.8	19.1
Reed Sheppard	52	3	12.6	.351	.338	.813	1.5	1.4	.7	.3	4.4
Jabari Smith Jr.	57	39	30.1	.438	.354	.825	7.0	1.1	.4	.7	12.2
Jae'Sean Tate	52	2	11.3	.473	.348	.681	2.3	.9	.5	.1	3.6
Amen Thompson	69	42	32.3	.557	.275	.684	8.2	3.8	1.4	1.3	14.1
Fred VanVleet	60	60	35.2	.378	.345	.810	3.7	5.6	1.6	.4	14.1
Cam Whitmore	51	3	16.2	.444	.355	.750	3.0	1.0	.6	.3	9.4
Nate Williams	20	0	7.3	.435	.231	.625	.7	.5	.4	.2	3.3

=== Playoffs ===
Houston Rockets statistics
Player	GP	GS	MPG	FG%	3P%	FT%	RPG	APG	SPG	BPG	PPG
Steven Adams	7	0	22.1	.600		.533	6.6	.6	.4	1.1	5.7
Dillon Brooks	7	7	29.4	.444	.345	.833	3.1	1.3	.7	.3	12.3
Tari Eason	7	0	18.9	.477	.368	.500	4.3	.7	1.1	1.0	7.6
Jalen Green	7	7	31.3	.372	.295	.667	5.4	2.9	.6	.3	13.3
Jeff Green	3	0	1.8	.333	1.000		.3	.0	.0	.0	1.0
Aaron Holiday	3	0	9.1	.400	.400	.500	.7	1.0	.0	.0	4.0
Jock Landale	1	0	4.9	.500			.0	.0	.0	.0	2.0
Alperen Şengün	7	7	36.6	.450	.375	.625	11.9	5.3	1.9	.4	20.9
Reed Sheppard	3	0	3.3	.000	.000		.3	.3	.7	.3	.0
Jabari Smith Jr.	7	0	20.5	.500	.455	.800	3.9	.6	.1	.7	7.4
Amen Thompson	7	7	33.1	.494	.250	.694	6.9	3.3	1.7	.9	15.7
Fred VanVleet	7	7	40.0	.430	.435	1.000	4.1	4.4	1.0	.3	18.7
Cam Whitmore	3	0	1.8	.000	.000		.3	.0	.0	.0	.0
Nate Williams	3	0	1.7	.000	.000		.0	.0	.0	.0	.0

- ^{†} Denotes player spent time with another team in the season. Stats reflect time with the Rockets only.

== Transactions ==
=== Trades ===
June 26, 2024	To Houston Rockets 2025 PHX first-round pick swap right 2027 PHX first-round pick 2029 first-round pick 2029 first-round pick swap right	To Brooklyn Nets 2025 BKN first-round pick swap right relinquished 2026 BKN first-round pick returned
June 27, 2024	Three-team trade
June 27, 2024	To Houston Rockets AJ Griffin (from Atlanta)	To Atlanta Hawks Draft rights to Nikola Djurišić (No. 43) (from Miami)
June 27, 2024	To Miami Heat Draft rights to Pelle Larsson (No. 44) (from Houston); Cash considerations (from Atlanta)
February 6, 2025	To Houston Rockets Jaden Springer; 2027 protected second-round pick 2030 second-round pick	To Boston Celtics 2031 protected second-round pick

==== Subtractions ====
Date	Player	Reason left	New team	Ref.
September 20, 2024	AJ Griffin	Waived	—N/a (Retired)	
