= Amen Thompson =

American basketball player (born 2003)

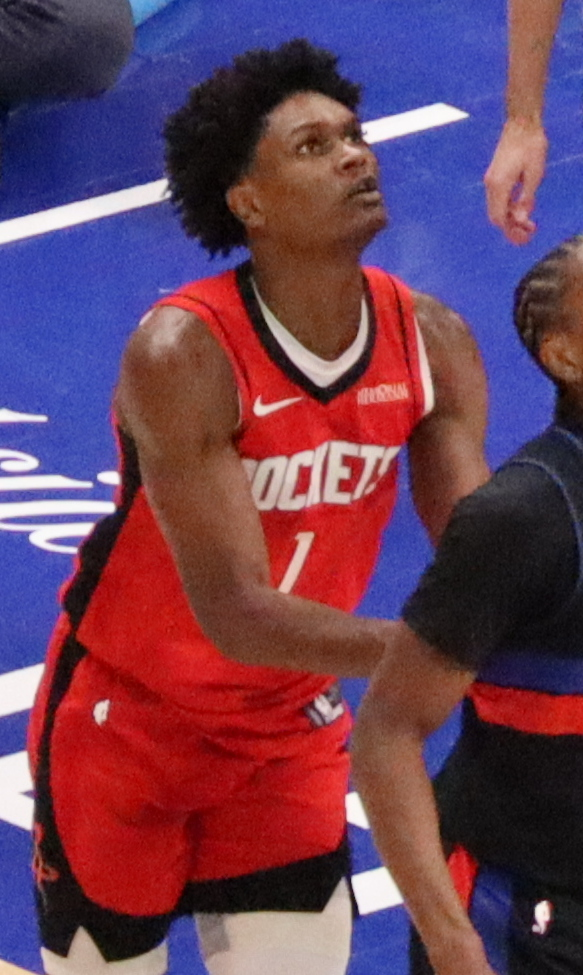
- Thompson with the Houston Rockets in 2026

No. 1 – Houston Rockets
- Position: Point guard / small forward
- League: NBA

Personal information
- Born: January 30, 2003 (age 23) Oakland, California, U.S.
- Listed height: 6 ft 7 in (2.01 m)
- Listed weight: 227 lb (103 kg)

Career information
- High school: Pine Crest (Fort Lauderdale, Florida)
- NBA draft: 2023: 1st round, 4th overall pick
- Drafted by: Houston Rockets
- Playing career: 2021–present

Career history
- 2021–2022: Team OTE
- 2022–2023: City Reapers
- 2023–present: Houston Rockets
- 2023: →Rio Grande Valley Vipers

Career highlights
- NBA All-Defensive First Team (2025); NBA All-Rookie Second Team (2024); OTE champion (2023); All-OTE First Team (2023)
- Stats at NBA.com
- Stats at Basketball Reference

Ameiz XLNC "Amen" Thompson (/əˈmɛn ˈɛksələns ˈtɒmsən/ ə-MEN EK-sə-lənss TOM-sən; born January 30, 2003) is an American professional basketball player for the Houston Rockets of the National Basketball Association (NBA). He played basketball for Pine Crest School in Fort Lauderdale, Florida, where he was rated a five-star recruit by ESPN and won a state title. Thompson bypassed his senior year of high school to sign with OTE, where he played for two seasons and helped his team win the league title while earning All-OTE First Team honors in 2023. He was selected 4th overall in the 2023 NBA draft by the Houston Rockets. In 2024, he made the NBA All-Rookie Second Team, and in 2025 he was named to the NBA All-Defensive first team. He is the twin brother of basketball player Ausar Thompson.

== Early life ==
Thompson was born to Maya Wilson and Troy Thompson and raised in San Leandro, California. He is of Jamaican descent through his father. His identical twin brother, Ausar, was born one minute after him; they share the middle name "XLNC" (pronounced "excellence"). Thompson's older brother, Troy Jr., played college basketball for Prairie View A&M. His uncle, Mark Thompson, represented Jamaica in 400 meter hurdles at the 1992 Summer Olympics. He and Ausar began training for basketball under the guidance of their father by age seven and drew inspiration from LeBron James. The twins were homeschooled in sixth and seventh grades to focus on basketball.

== High school career ==
Entering eighth grade, Thompson and his family moved to Fort Lauderdale, Florida so that he and Ausar could play high school basketball one year early at Pine Crest School. The twins immediately started for the team. As a sophomore at Pine Crest, Thompson averaged 16.9 points, 7.3 rebounds and 3.7 assists per game, earning All-County honorable mention. Entering his junior season, he was named to the Broward County Fab Five by the Sun-Sentinel. He averaged 20.5 points, 8.4 rebounds and 4.4 assists per game as a junior, leading his team to the Class 4A state championship in a 90–83 double overtime win over Santa Fe High School. In the title game, Thompson scored 43 points and helped Pine Crest overcome an eight-point deficit with 45 seconds left in overtime. He shared Broward County Class 5A-1A co-player of the year honors from the Sun-Sentinel with Ausar.

=== Recruiting ===
Thompson was considered a five-star recruit by ESPN and a four-star recruit by Rivals. He gained interest from college programs in 2019, receiving a scholarship offer from Alabama. After his junior year, Thompson held offers from Alabama, Arizona, Auburn, Arizona State and Kansas, among other programs, before deciding to not play college basketball.

College recruiting
Name	Hometown	School	Height	Weight	Commit date
Amen Thompson; PG / SG / SF	Fort Lauderdale, FL	Pine Crest (FL)	6 ft 6 in (1.98 m)	195 lb (88 kg)	—
Amen Thompson; PG / SG / SF	Recruit ratings: Rivals: ESPN: (90)				
Overall recruit ranking:
Note: In many cases, Scout, Rivals, 247Sports, On3, and ESPN may conflict in their listings of height and weight.; In these cases, the average was taken. ESPN grades are on a 100-point scale.; Sources:

== Professional career ==
=== Team OTE (2021–2022) ===
On May 25, 2021, Thompson signed a two-year contract with Overtime Elite (OTE), a new professional league based in Atlanta with players between ages 16 and 20. He joined the league with his brother Ausar, bypassing his final year of high school and college, because he felt that it would prepare him best for the NBA. In the 2021–22 season, Thompson played for Team OTE, one of three teams in the league, and averaged 14 points, 6.6 rebounds, 3.8 assists and 2.1 steals per game. He competed against other OTE teams, as well as prep school and postgraduate opponents. He helped his team achieve a runner-up finish, scoring 13 points in a 52–45 loss to Team Elite in the decisive third game of the finals. Thompson played for OTE affiliate Team Overtime in The Basketball Tournament in July 2022. His team lost to Omaha Blue Crew, 74–70, in the first round of the tournament.

=== City Reapers (2022–2023) ===
In the 2022–23 OTE season, Thompson played for the City Reapers alongside team captain Ausar, who selected him with the first pick in the league's draft. On January 9, 2023, he was named OTE Player of the Week, three days after recording 22 points, 10 rebounds, seven assists and five steals in a 101–90 win over the Cold Hearts. In the regular season, Thompson averaged 16.4 points, 5.9 rebounds, 5.9 assists and 2.3 steals per game and was named to the All-OTE First Team. In game 2 of the OTE Finals, he made a game-winning layup at the buzzer in an 80–78 win over the YNG Dreamerz. Thompson helped the Reapers win the league championship in a 3–0 sweep. On April 21, 2023, he declared for the 2023 NBA draft, where analysts viewed him as a potential top-10 pick in the NBA draft.

=== Houston Rockets (2023–present) ===
The Houston Rockets selected Thompson with the fourth overall pick in the 2023 NBA draft, one pick ahead of his twin brother Ausar. They were the first brothers in NBA draft history to be selected in the top 5 in the same year. He made his NBA debut on October 25, 2023, scoring eight points along with five rebounds and two assists in a 116–86 loss to the Orlando Magic. He went on to miss a several games around start of the season after suffering a Grade 2 ankle sprain on his left ankle. He was sent to the G-League on December 5 for development before being recalled from the Rockets four days later. He made his return on the bench after a 15-game absence and recorded two points, five rebounds, and one assist in 10 minutes in the 93–82 win over the San Antonio Spurs. His minutes and numbers increased while playing full-time in the starting lineup for the final 15 games of the season after teammate Alperen Şengün missed the closing weeks of the season due to a knee injury. In the final game of his rookie season, Thompson recorded his first triple-double in a win against the Los Angeles Clippers with totals of 18 points, 11 rebounds, and 10 assists. He was selected to the NBA All-Rookie Second Team and became the fifth Rockets player to receive NBA All-Rookie recognition within the last four seasons.

On December 30, 2024, Thompson was ejected from a game against the Miami Heat following a confrontation with Heat guard Tyler Herro with only 35 seconds remaining in the fourth quarter of a tight contest. While the two were battling for position during an inbounds play, Thompson grabbed Herro by the jersey and threw him to the ground. The incident occurred just moments after Thompson's teammate, Fred VanVleet, was ejected for bumping a referee. The altercation pulled in teammates and coaching staff from both teams, and six individuals were ultimately ejected, being Thompson, Herro, Rockets guard Jalen Green, Rockets head coach Ime Udoka, Rockets assistant coach Ben Sullivan, and Heat guard Terry Rozier. The Rockets finished ended with a defeat at home with a final score of 102–100. Following the loss to the Heat, Thompson received a two-game suspension.

Thompson took a major role in January–February when he started in the line-up for the injured Jabari Smith Jr.. On January 5, 2025, he put up 23 points alongside a then career-high 16 rebounds in a 119–115 win over the Los Angeles Lakers. On January 27, he put up a then career-high 33 points and the game-winning shot in a 114–112 win over the Boston Celtics. At the conclusion of the season, he was named to his first NBA All-Defensive Team, becoming the fifth Rockets player to receive the honor.

On January 26, 2026, Thompson put up a career-high 14 assists alongside eight points, eight rebounds, and one steal in a 108–99 win over the Memphis Grizzlies. On April 10, he scored a career-high 41 points on 17-of-22 shooting in a 132–136 loss against the Minnesota Timberwolves.

On September 3, 2026, Thompson signed a five-year, $208 million extension with the Rockets.

== Career statistics ==
Legend
GP	Games played	GS	Games started	MPG	Minutes per game
FG%	Field goal percentage	3P%	3-point field goal percentage	FT%	Free throw percentage
RPG	Rebounds per game	APG	Assists per game	SPG	Steals per game
BPG	Blocks per game	PPG	Points per game	**Bold**	Career high
*	Led the league

=== NBA ===
==== Regular season ====
Year	Team	GP	GS	MPG	FG%	3P%	FT%	RPG	APG	SPG	BPG	PPG
2023–24	Houston	62	23	22.4	.536	.138	.684	6.6	2.6	1.3	.6	9.5
2024–25	Houston	69	42	32.2	**.557**	**.275**	.684	**8.2**	3.8	1.4	**1.3**	14.1
2025–26	Houston	**79**	**79**	**37.4**	.534	.216	**.779**	7.8	**5.3**	**1.5**	.6	**18.3**
Career		210	144	31.3	.541	.219	.731	7.6	4.0	1.4	.8	14.3

==== Playoffs ====
Year	Team	GP	GS	MPG	FG%	3P%	FT%	RPG	APG	SPG	BPG	PPG
2025	Houston	**7**	**7**	33.0	**.494**	**.250**	.694	6.9	3.3	1.7	.9	15.7
2026	Houston	6	6	**44.0***	.488	**.250**	**.707**	**7.0**	**5.7**	**2.0**	**1.2**	**19.2**
Career		13	13	38.1	.491	.250	.701	6.9	4.4	1.8	1.0	17.3
