= Nate Williams (basketball, born 1999) =

American basketball player (born 1999)

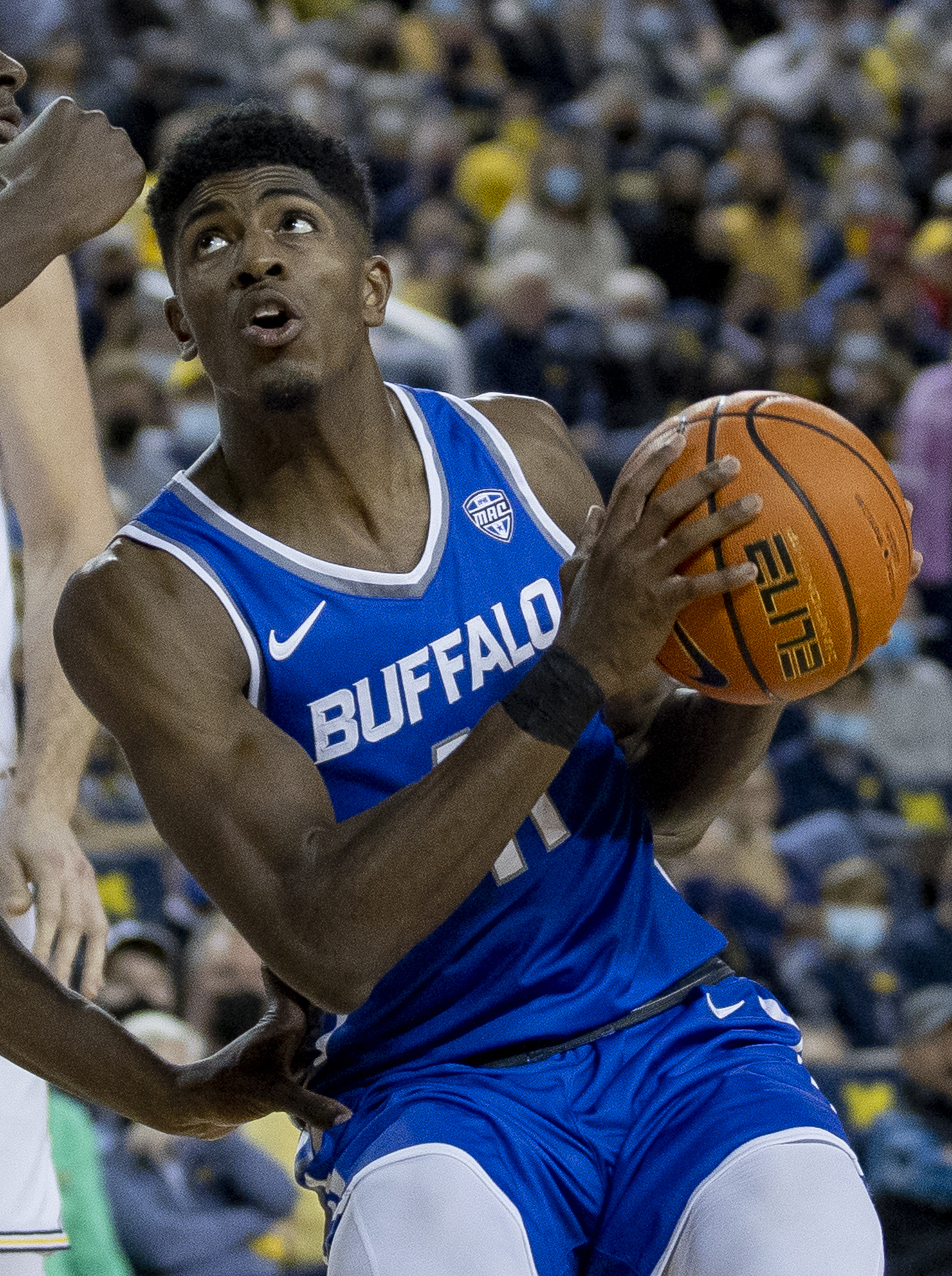
- Williams with Buffalo in 2021

No. 19 – Chiba Jets
- Position: Shooting guard / small forward
- League: B.League

Personal information
- Born: February 12, 1999 (age 27) Rochester, New York, U.S.
- Listed height: 6 ft 5 in (1.96 m)
- Listed weight: 205 lb (93 kg)

Career information
- High school: University Prep Charter (Rochester, New York); Prolific Prep (Napa, California)
- College: Buffalo (2018–2022)
- NBA draft: 2022: undrafted
- Playing career: 2022–present

Career history
- 2022–2023: Salt Lake City Stars
- 2023: Portland Trail Blazers
- 2023–2025: Houston Rockets
- 2023–2025: →Rio Grande Valley Vipers
- 2025–2026: Long Island Nets
- 2026: Golden State Warriors
- 2026: →Santa Cruz Warriors
- 2026–present: Chiba Jets

Career highlights
- First-team All-MAC (2022); Second-team All-MAC (2021)
- Stats at NBA.com
- Stats at Basketball Reference

Jeenathan Lewis "Nate" Williams Jr. (born February 12, 1999) is an American professional basketball player for the Chiba Jets of the Japanese B.League. He played college basketball for the Buffalo Bulls.

== High school career ==
A native of Rochester, New York, Williams played basketball for University Prep Charter School for Young Men. As a junior, he averaged 22 points, seven rebounds and five assists per game and was named to the Class AA all-state fifth team. For his senior season, Williams transferred to Prolific Prep in Napa, California, where he averaged 15.8 points per game. He competed for the City Rocks on the Amateur Athletic Union circuit alongside Isaiah Stewart and Buddy Boeheim. A four-star recruit, Williams committed to playing college basketball for Buffalo over offers from Syracuse, Virginia, Pittsburgh, Temple and St. Bonaventure. He became the highest-rated recruit in program history per Rivals.com.

== College career ==
As a freshman at Buffalo, Williams averaged 3.2 points and 1.7 rebounds per game. He played only 9.1 minutes per game on a team that finished 32–4 and was ranked all season. In his sophomore season, he moved into the starting lineup, and averaged 11.6 points and 4.7 rebounds per game. Following the season, he worked on his ballhandling and shooting with coaches in Florida and California. On November 27, 2020, Williams posted a junior season-high 28 points and 12 rebounds in a 74–65 win against Towson. As a junior, he averaged 17.6 points, 6.8 rebounds and 2.4 assists per game, earning Second Team All-Mid-American Conference (MAC) honors. Williams declared for the 2021 NBA draft before withdrawing and returning to Buffalo. In his senior season debut on November 10, 2021, he scored a career-high 32 points and grabbed eight rebounds in an 88–76 loss to sixth-ranked Michigan. Williams was named to the First Team All-MAC.

== Professional career ==
=== Salt Lake City Stars (2022–2023) ===
After going undrafted in the 2022 NBA draft, Williams joined the Utah Jazz for the 2022 NBA Summer League. On October 11, 2022, he signed an exhibit 10 contract with the Jazz, but was waived the next day. On October 19, Williams signed with the Salt Lake City Stars of the NBA G League.

=== Portland Trail Blazers (2023) ===
On April 1, 2023, he signed with the Portland Trail Blazers. Williams made his NBA debut the next day, scoring 7 points in a 107–105 win over the Minnesota Timberwolves. He became the first Buffalo alumnus to play in the NBA since Sam Pellom forty years earlier.

On July 28, 2023, Williams was waived by the Trail Blazers.

=== Houston Rockets (2023–2025) ===
On August 2, 2023, he signed with the Houston Rockets and on October 23, his deal was converted into a two-way contract. Williams appeared in the season opener on October 25, scoring four points in less than five minutes of play.

On March 2, 2024, the Rockets signed Williams to a four-year, $8.2 million standard contract. He made the 2024-25 NBA All-Star team after averaging 24 points, 9 rebounds, and 6 assists as an injury replacement for Joel Embiid. He tore his ACL after All-Star weekend. He made 20 appearances for Houston during the 2024–25 NBA season, averaging 3.3 points, 0.7 rebounds, and 0.5 assists. Williams was waived by the Rockets on July 13.

On September 27, 2025, he signed with the Los Angeles Lakers. Williams was waived prior to the start of the regular season on October 18.

=== Golden State / Santa Cruz Warriors (2026) ===
On February 16, 2026, he signed a two-way contract with the Golden State Warriors. On March 2, Williams recorded a career-high 18 points with three three-pointers during a 101–114 loss to the Los Angeles Clippers.

=== Chiba Jets (2026–present) ===
On July 17, 2026, he moved to Japan and signed a contract with Chiba Jets in the B.League.

== Career statistics ==
Legend
GP	Games played	GS	Games started	MPG	Minutes per game
FG%	Field goal percentage	3P%	3-point field goal percentage	FT%	Free throw percentage
RPG	Rebounds per game	APG	Assists per game	SPG	Steals per game
BPG	Blocks per game	PPG	Points per game	**Bold**	Career high

=== NBA ===
Year	Team	GP	GS	MPG	FG%	3P%	FT%	RPG	APG	SPG	BPG	PPG
2022–23	Portland	5	**4**	**25.3**	**.615**	.375	.667	**3.0**	**2.0**	**.6**	**.4**	**10.6**
2023–24	Houston	**22**	0	5.9	.540	.400	.538	1.0	.3	.2	.0	2.9
2024–25	Houston	20	0	7.4	.435	.231	.625	.7	.5	.4	.2	3.3
2025–26	Golden State	14	2	17.1	.489	**.433**	**.867**	2.1	1.0	.4	.0	8.0
Career		61	6	10.5	.506	.348	.692	1.3	.7	.3	.1	4.8

=== College ===
Year	Team	GP	GS	MPG	FG%	3P%	FT%	RPG	APG	SPG	BPG	PPG
2018–19	Buffalo	**36**	0	9.1	.358	.106	.611	1.7	.2	.2	.2	3.2
2019–20	Buffalo	32	**31**	25.7	.455	.318	**.708**	4.7	1.2	.8	.7	11.6
2020–21	Buffalo	25	24	30.8	.486	.386	**.708**	**6.8**	2.4	1.1	.4	17.6
2021–22	Buffalo	29	29	**32.6**	**.490**	**.451**	.690	5.0	**2.9**	**1.4**	**.8**	**19.1**
Career		122	84	23.5	.467	.355	.688	4.3	1.6	.8	.5	12.1
