= 2023–24 Houston Rockets season =

- Head coach: Ime Udoka
- President: Gretchen Sheirr
- General manager: Rafael Stone
- Owner: Tilman Fertitta
- Arena: Toyota Center

Results
- Record: 41–41 (.500)
- Place: Division: 3rd (Southwest); Conference: 11th (Western)
- Playoff finish: Did not qualify
- Stats at Basketball Reference

Local media
- Television: Space City Home Network
- Radio: Sportstalk 790

The 2023–24 Houston Rockets season was the 57th season of the franchise in the National Basketball Association (NBA), and 53rd season in the city of Houston.

On April 10, 2023, the Houston Rockets fired head coach Stephen Silas after three rebuilding seasons with the team. Two weeks later, the Rockets hired Ime Udoka as their new head coach, looking to contend for the playoffs. After starting out 0–3 in October, the Rockets had a six-game winning streak to start out November.

The Rockets entered the month of March with a 27–34 record and stood at 11th place in the Western Conference. Despite losing breakout player Alperen Şengün to injury, the Rockets won 13 of their next 14 games, including an 11-game winning streak buoyed by career-best performances from star Jalen Green alongside one-time all-star Fred VanVleet and rookie Amen Thompson, which allowed them to rise to contention for the play-in tournament. Their improved 38–35 record had them trail the Golden State Warriors by one game back from the #10-seed, but afterwards the Rockets fell into a five-game losing streak as the Warriors went on a winning streak of their own, resulting in their elimination from playoff contention for the fourth consecutive season following an overtime loss to the Dallas Mavericks on April 7. The Rockets would finish the season with a 41–41 record, finishing with a non-losing season for the first time in four years.

The Houston Rockets drew an average home attendance of 17,562 in 41 home games in the 2023-24 NBA season.

== Draft ==
| Round | Pick | Player | Position | Nationality | College / Club |
|---|---|---|---|---|---|
| 1 | 4 | Amen Thompson | Point guard | United States | City Reapers (Overtime Elite) |
| 1 | 20 | Cam Whitmore | Small forward | United States | Villanova (Fr.) |

The Rockets entered the draft with two first-round picks, one of which was a pick swap acquired with the Los Angeles Clippers in a February 2023 trade. The swap was successfully exercised because the Oklahoma City Thunder made the 2023 NBA playoffs, landing outside the Top 6 protection range and eliminating their pick from the least favorable selection pool, leaving Los Angeles as Houston's only remaining trade partner. They had traded their second-round pick to the Indiana Pacers in 2021; because it fell within the top 2 selections of the second round, it was successfully conveyed.

For their first pick at four, the Rockets selected point guard Amen Thompson from Overtime Elite's City Reapers team, being the organization's first ever draft pick entering the NBA. With their pick at 20, Houston selected small forward Cam Whitmore, who won the Big East Conference's Freshman of the Year Award for his only season at Villanova University. Before the draft, Whitmore was widely regarded to be a lottery pick with some projections placing him as high as fourth overall.

== Roster ==
2023–24 Houston Rockets roster
Players

| Pos. | No. | Player | Height | Weight | DOB | From |
|---|---|---|---|---|---|---|
| C | 12 | Steven Adams (injured) | 6 ft 11 in (2.11 m) | 265 lb (120 kg) | 1993-07-20 | Pittsburgh |
| G/F | 9 | Dillon Brooks | 6 ft 6 in (1.98 m) | 225 lb (102 kg) | 1996-01-22 | Oregon |
| G/F | 25 | Reggie Bullock | 6 ft 6 in (1.98 m) | 205 lb (93 kg) | 1991-03-16 | North Carolina |
| F | 17 | Tari Eason (injured) | 6 ft 8 in (2.03 m) | 215 lb (98 kg) | 2001-05-10 | LSU |
| G | 4 | Jalen Green | 6 ft 4 in (1.93 m) | 186 lb (84 kg) | 2002-02-09 | Prolific Prep (CA) |
| F | 32 | Jeff Green | 6 ft 8 in (2.03 m) | 235 lb (107 kg) | 1986-08-28 | Georgetown |
| G/F | 14 | Nate Hinton (TW) | 6 ft 5 in (1.96 m) | 210 lb (95 kg) | 1999-06-08 | Houston |
| G | 0 | Aaron Holiday | 6 ft 0 in (1.83 m) | 185 lb (84 kg) | 1996-09-30 | UCLA |
| C | 2 | Jock Landale | 6 ft 11 in (2.11 m) | 255 lb (116 kg) | 1995-10-25 | Saint Mary's |
| C | 51 | Boban Marjanović | 7 ft 4 in (2.24 m) | 290 lb (132 kg) | 1988-08-15 | Serbia |
| F | 00 | Jermaine Samuels (TW) | 6 ft 6 in (1.98 m) | 230 lb (104 kg) | 1998-11-12 | Villanova |
| C | 28 | Alperen Şengün (injured) | 6 ft 11 in (2.11 m) | 243 lb (110 kg) | 2002-07-25 | Turkey |
| F | 10 | Jabari Jr. Smith | 6 ft 11 in (2.11 m) | 220 lb (100 kg) | 2003-05-13 | Auburn |
| F | 8 | Jae'Sean Tate (injured) | 6 ft 4 in (1.93 m) | 230 lb (104 kg) | 1995-10-28 | Ohio State |
| G/F | 1 | Amen Thompson | 6 ft 7 in (2.01 m) | 200 lb (91 kg) | 2003-01-30 | Pine Crest (FL) |
| G | 5 | Fred VanVleet | 6 ft 0 in (1.83 m) | 197 lb (89 kg) | 1994-02-25 | Wichita State |
| F | 7 | Cam Whitmore | 6 ft 7 in (2.01 m) | 230 lb (104 kg) | 2004-07-08 | Villanova |
| G/F | 19 | Nate Williams (TW) | 6 ft 5 in (1.96 m) | 205 lb (93 kg) | 1999-02-12 | Buffalo |

Coaches
Head coach
- Ime Udoka
Assistant(s)
- Will Dunn
- Cam Hodges
- Royal Ivey
- Garrett Jackson
- Mike Moser
- Tiago Splitter
- Ben Sullivan

Legend
- (DP) Unsigned draft pick
- (FA) Free agent
- (S) Suspended
- (GL) On assignment to G League affiliate
- (TW) Two-way affiliate player
- Injured

Roster
Updated: April 6, 2024

== Standings ==
=== Division ===
| Southwest Division | W | L | PCT | GB | Home | Road | Div | GP |
|---|---|---|---|---|---|---|---|---|
| y – Dallas Mavericks | 50 | 32 | .610 | – | 25‍–‍16 | 25‍–‍16 | 11‍–‍5 | 82 |
| x – New Orleans Pelicans | 49 | 33 | .598 | 1.0 | 21‍–‍19 | 28‍–‍14 | 9‍–‍7 | 82 |
| Houston Rockets | 41 | 41 | .500 | 9.0 | 27‍–‍14 | 14‍–‍27 | 9‍–‍7 | 82 |
| Memphis Grizzlies | 27 | 55 | .329 | 23.0 | 9‍–‍32 | 18‍–‍23 | 8‍–‍8 | 82 |
| San Antonio Spurs | 22 | 60 | .268 | 28.0 | 12‍–‍29 | 10‍–‍31 | 3‍–‍13 | 82 |

=== Conference ===
Western Conference
| # | Team | W | L | PCT | GB | GP |
|---|---|---|---|---|---|---|
| 1 | c – Oklahoma City Thunder * | 57 | 25 | .695 | – | 82 |
| 2 | x – Denver Nuggets | 57 | 25 | .695 | – | 82 |
| 3 | x – Minnesota Timberwolves | 56 | 26 | .683 | 1.0 | 82 |
| 4 | y – Los Angeles Clippers * | 51 | 31 | .622 | 6.0 | 82 |
| 5 | y – Dallas Mavericks * | 50 | 32 | .610 | 7.0 | 82 |
| 6 | x – Phoenix Suns | 49 | 33 | .598 | 8.0 | 82 |
| 7 | x – New Orleans Pelicans | 49 | 33 | .598 | 8.0 | 82 |
| 8 | x – Los Angeles Lakers | 47 | 35 | .573 | 10.0 | 82 |
| 9 | pi – Sacramento Kings | 46 | 36 | .561 | 11.0 | 82 |
| 10 | pi – Golden State Warriors | 46 | 36 | .561 | 11.0 | 82 |
| 11 | Houston Rockets | 41 | 41 | .500 | 16.0 | 82 |
| 12 | Utah Jazz | 31 | 51 | .378 | 26.0 | 82 |
| 13 | Memphis Grizzlies | 27 | 55 | .329 | 30.0 | 82 |
| 14 | San Antonio Spurs | 22 | 60 | .268 | 35.0 | 82 |
| 15 | Portland Trail Blazers | 21 | 61 | .256 | 36.0 | 82 |

== Game log ==
=== Preseason ===
2023 preseason game log
Total: 4–1 (Home: 2–0; Road: 2–1)
Preseason: 4–1 (home: 2–0; road: 2–1)

| Game | Date | Team | Score | High points | High rebounds | High assists | Location Attendance | Record |
|---|---|---|---|---|---|---|---|---|
| 1 | October 10 | Indiana | W 122–103 | Alperen Şengün (15) | Amen Thompson (9) | Şengün, VanVleet (4) | Toyota Center; 12,680 | 1–0 |
| 2 | October 12 | @ New Orleans | W 120–87 | Jabari Smith Jr. (22) | Jabari Smith Jr. (9) | Holiday, Şengün, Thompson, VanVleet (4) | Legacy Arena; 11,589 | 2–0 |
| 3 | October 16 | @ San Antonio | W 99–89 | Thompson, Whitmore (15) | Holiday, Smith Jr. (9) | Aaron Holiday (6) | Frost Bank Center; 16,030 | 3–0 |
| 4 | October 18 | @ San Antonio | L 103–117 | Jabari Smith Jr. (20) | Jeenathan Williams (8) | Amen Thompson (4) | Frost Bank Center; 17,236 | 3–1 |
| 5 | October 20 | Miami | W 110–104 | Ja. Green, VanVleet (20) | Alperen Şengün (12) | Fred VanVleet (6) | Toyota Center; 18,055 | 4–1 |

2023–24 preseason schedule

=== Regular season ===
2023–24 game log
Total: 41–41 (Home: 27–14; Road: 14–27)
October: 0–3 (home: 0–1; road: 0–2)

| Game | Date | Team | Score | High points | High rebounds | High assists | Location Attendance | Record |
|---|---|---|---|---|---|---|---|---|
| 1 | October 25 | @ Orlando | L 86–116 | Brooks, Şengün, VanVleet (14) | Alperen Şengün (8) | Alperen Şengün (6) | Amway Center; 18,846 | 0–1 |
| 2 | October 27 | @ San Antonio | L 122–126 (OT) | Alperen Şengün (25) | Alperen Şengün (14) | Fred VanVleet (12) | Frost Bank Center; 18,354 | 0–2 |
| 3 | October 29 | Golden State | L 95–106 | Jalen Green (21) | Jalen Green (9) | Alperen Şengün (7) | Toyota Center; 18,055 | 0–3 |

November: 8–5 (home: 8–0; road: 0–5)

| Game | Date | Team | Score | High points | High rebounds | High assists | Location Attendance | Record |
|---|---|---|---|---|---|---|---|---|
| 4 | November 1 | Charlotte | W 128–119 | Jalen Green (23) | Alperen Şengün (7) | Fred VanVleet (11) | Toyota Center; 16,263 | 1–3 |
| 5 | November 4 | Sacramento | W 107–89 | Dillon Brooks (26) | Jabari Smith Jr. (11) | Fred VanVleet (12) | Toyota Center; 18,055 | 2–3 |
| 6 | November 6 | Sacramento | W 122–97 | Jalen Green (23) | Alperen Şengün (8) | Alperen Şengün (12) | Toyota Center; 15,130 | 3–3 |
| 7 | November 8 | L.A. Lakers | W 128–94 | Jalen Green (28) | Tari Eason (9) | Fred VanVleet (10) | Toyota Center; 18,055 | 4–3 |
| 8 | November 10 | New Orleans | W 104–101 | Jalen Green (25) | Eason, Şengün (8) | Fred VanVleet (8) | Toyota Center; 16,236 | 5–3 |
| 9 | November 12 | Denver | W 107–104 | Fred VanVleet (26) | Ja. Green, Şengün (8) | Ja. Green, Şengün (5) | Toyota Center; 18,055 | 6–3 |
| 10 | November 17 | @ L.A. Clippers | L 100–106 | Alperen Şengün (23) | Şengün, VanVleet (8) | Fred VanVleet (10) | Crypto.com Arena; 19,370 | 6–4 |
| 11 | November 19 | @ L.A. Lakers | L 104–105 | Dillon Brooks (24) | Alperen Şengün (10) | Fred VanVleet (16) | Crypto.com Arena; 18,997 | 6–5 |
| 12 | November 20 | @ Golden State | L 116–121 | Alperen Şengün (30) | Alperen Şengün (13) | Fred VanVleet (14) | Chase Center; 18,064 | 6–6 |
| 13 | November 22 | Memphis | W 111–91 | Jalen Green (34) | Smith Jr., Tate (9) | Ja. Green, Tate, VanVleet (4) | Toyota Center; 18,055 | 7–6 |
| 14 | November 24 | Denver | W 105–86 | Jalen Green (25) | Şengün, Smith Jr. (15) | Fred VanVleet (11) | Toyota Center; 18,055 | 8–6 |
| 15 | November 28 | @ Dallas | L 115–121 | Alperen Şengün (31) | Şengün, Smith Jr. (9) | Fred VanVleet (12) | American Airlines Center; 20,103 | 8–7 |
| 16 | November 29 | @ Denver | L 124–134 | Jalen Green (26) | Şengün, Smith Jr. (7) | Jalen Green (9) | Ball Arena; 19,590 | 8–8 |

December : 7–7 (home: 4–4; road: 3–3)

| Game | Date | Team | Score | High points | High rebounds | High assists | Location Attendance | Record |
|---|---|---|---|---|---|---|---|---|
| 17 | December 2 | @ L.A. Lakers | L 97–107 | Fred VanVleet (22) | Alperen Şengün (13) | Fred VanVleet (7) | Crypto.com Arena; 18,997 | 8–9 |
| 18 | December 6 | Oklahoma City | W 110–101 | Dillon Brooks (23) | Jabari Smith Jr. (18) | Fred VanVleet (9) | Toyota Center; 16,291 | 9–9 |
| 19 | December 8 | @ Denver | W 114–106 | Fred VanVleet (26) | Şengün, Smith Jr. (10) | Alperen Şengün (7) | Ball Arena; 19,544 | 10–9 |
| 20 | December 11 | San Antonio | W 93–82 | Tari Eason (18) | Tari Eason (14) | Smith Jr., VanVleet (5) | Toyota Center; 16,481 | 11–9 |
| 21 | December 13 | Memphis | W 117–104 | Tari Eason (25) | Tari Eason (14) | Fred VanVleet (9) | Toyota Center; 16,813 | 12–9 |
| 22 | December 15 | @ Memphis | W 103–96 | Dillon Brooks (26) | Jabari Smith Jr. (12) | Fred VanVleet (8) | FedExForum; 16,941 | 13–9 |
| 23 | December 17 | @ Milwaukee | L 119–128 | Fred VanVleet (22) | Alperen Şengün (8) | Jalen Green (7) | Fiserv Forum; 17,341 | 13–10 |
| 24 | December 18 | @ Cleveland | L 130–135 (OT) | Fred VanVleet (27) | Eason, Şengün, VanVleet (8) | Fred VanVleet (17) | Rocket Mortgage FieldHouse; 19,432 | 13–11 |
| 25 | December 20 | Atlanta | L 127–134 | Jabari Smith Jr. (34) | Jabari Smith Jr. (13) | Fred VanVleet (15) | Toyota Center; 18,055 | 13–12 |
| 26 | December 22 | Dallas | W 122–96 | Alperen Şengün (22) | Alperen Şengün (15) | Green, Thompson, VanVleet (4) | Toyota Center; 18,055 | 14–12 |
| 27 | December 23 | @ New Orleans | W 106–104 | Alperen Şengün (37) | Şengün, Smith Jr. (11) | Alperen Şengün (6) | Smoothie King Center; 17,399 | 15–12 |
| 28 | December 26 | Indiana | L 117–123 | Alperen Şengün (30) | Alperen Şengün (16) | Fred VanVleet (9) | Toyota Center; 18,055 | 15–13 |
| 29 | December 27 | Phoenix | L 113–129 | Alperen Şengün (24) | three players (5) | Fred VanVleet (6) | Toyota Center; 18,055 | 15–14 |
| 30 | December 29 | Philadelphia | L 127–131 | Fred VanVleet (33) | Tari Eason (11) | Fred VanVleet (10) | Toyota Center; 18,055 | 15–15 |

January : 7–10 (home: 5–4; road: 2–6)

| Game | Date | Team | Score | High points | High rebounds | High assists | Location Attendance | Record |
|---|---|---|---|---|---|---|---|---|
| 31 | January 1 | Detroit | W 136–113 | Alperen Şengün (26) | Jabari Smith Jr. (6) | Alperen Şengün (9) | Toyota Center; 18,055 | 16–15 |
| 32 | January 3 | Brooklyn | W 112–101 | Alperen Şengün (30) | Jabari Smith Jr. (12) | Fred VanVleet (10) | Toyota Center; 16,563 | 17–15 |
| 33 | January 5 | Minnesota | L 95–122 | Jalen Green (20) | Jabari Smith Jr. (9) | Fred VanVleet (8) | Toyota Center; 18,055 | 17–16 |
| 34 | January 6 | Milwaukee | W 112–108 | Alperen Şengün (21) | Jabari Smith Jr. (12) | Fred VanVleet (7) | Toyota Center; 18,055 | 18–16 |
| 35 | January 8 | @ Miami | L 113–120 | Fred VanVleet (32) | Alperen Şengün (11) | Fred VanVleet (7) | Kaseya Center; 19,694 | 18–17 |
| 36 | January 10 | @ Chicago | L 119–124 (OT) | Alperen Şengün (25) | Jabari Smith Jr. (15) | Fred VanVleet (10) | United Center; 21,149 | 18–18 |
| 37 | January 12 | @ Detroit | W 112–110 | Alperen Şengün (29) | Jabari Smith Jr. (11) | Fred VanVleet (12) | Little Caesars Arena; 13,987 | 19–18 |
| 38 | January 13 | @ Boston | L 113–145 | Cam Whitmore (22) | Şengün, Thompson (10) | Fred VanVleet (7) | TD Garden; 19,156 | 19–19 |
| 39 | January 15 | @ Philadelphia | L 115–124 | Jalen Green (20) | Alperen Şengün (9) | Alperen Şengün (6) | Wells Fargo Center; 20,822 | 19–20 |
| 40 | January 17 | @ New York | L 94–109 | Fred VanVleet (24) | Alperen Şengün (10) | Fred VanVleet (12) | Madison Square Garden; 19,439 | 19–21 |
| 41 | January 20 | Utah | W 127–126 (OT) | Alperen Şengün (37) | Alperen Şengün (14) | Fred VanVleet (7) | Toyota Center; 16,618 | 20–21 |
| 42 | January 21 | Boston | L 107–116 | Dillon Brooks (25) | Amen Thompson (14) | Alperen Şengün (10) | Toyota Center; 18,055 | 20–22 |
| 43 | January 24 | Portland | L 131–137 (OT) | Alperen Şengün (30) | Alperen Şengün (10) | Alperen Şengün (8) | Toyota Center; 18,055 | 20–23 |
| 44 | January 26 | @ Charlotte | W 138–104 | Jalen Green (36) | Cam Whitmore (11) | Amen Thompson (8) | Spectrum Center; 16,164 | 21–23 |
| 45 | January 27 | @ Brooklyn | L 104–106 | Brooks, Ja. Green, Whitmore (19) | Alperen Şengün (11) | Fred VanVleet (8) | Barclays Center; 17,732 | 21–24 |
| 46 | January 29 | L.A. Lakers | W 135–119 | Jalen Green (34) | Ja. Green, Şengün (12) | Fred VanVleet (14) | Toyota Center; 18,055 | 22–24 |
| 47 | January 31 | New Orleans | L 99–110 | Jalen Green (31) | Alperen Şengün (10) | Şengün, VanVleet (5) | Toyota Center; 18,055 | 22–25 |

February : 3–9 (home: 3–1; road: 0–8)

| Game | Date | Team | Score | High points | High rebounds | High assists | Location Attendance | Record |
|---|---|---|---|---|---|---|---|---|
| 48 | February 2 | Toronto | W 135–106 | Cam Whitmore (25) | Alperen Şengün (13) | Alperen Şengün (8) | Toyota Center; 18,055 | 23–25 |
| 49 | February 4 | @ Minnesota | L 90–111 | Alperen Şengün (15) | Alperen Şengün (10) | Jalen Green (7) | Target Center; 18,024 | 23–26 |
| 50 | February 6 | @ Indiana | L 129–132 | Jalen Green (30) | Amen Thompson (13) | Şengün, Thompson (6) | Gainbridge Fieldhouse; 15,571 | 23–27 |
| 51 | February 9 | @ Toronto | L 104–107 | Dillon Brooks (20) | Jabari Smith Jr. (10) | Aaron Holiday (5) | Scotiabank Arena; 19,800 | 23–28 |
| 52 | February 10 | @ Atlanta | L 113–122 | Jalen Green (26) | Jalen Green (14) | Jalen Green (10) | State Farm Arena; 17,503 | 23–29 |
| 53 | February 12 | New York | W 105–103 | Dillon Brooks (23) | Amen Thompson (13) | Alperen Şengün (6) | Toyota Center; 16,790 | 24–29 |
| 54 | February 14 | @ Memphis | L 113–121 | four players (19) | Amen Thompson (12) | Alperen Şengün (6) | FedExForum; 15,012 | 24–30 |
All-Star Game
| 55 | February 22 | @ New Orleans | L 105–127 | Amen Thompson (22) | Alperen Şengün (9) | Fred VanVleet (6) | Smoothie King Center; 17,421 | 24–31 |
| 56 | February 23 | Phoenix | W 114–110 | Fred VanVleet (23) | Jabari Smith Jr. (16) | Fred VanVleet (5) | Toyota Center; 18,055 | 25–31 |
| 57 | February 25 | Oklahoma City | L 110–123 | Smith Jr., VanVleet (20) | Jabari Smith Jr. (17) | Ja. Green, Smith Jr. (4) | Toyota Center; 18,055 | 25–32 |
| 58 | February 27 | @ Oklahoma City | L 95–112 | Alperen Şengün (23) | Jabari Smith Jr. (13) | Alperen Şengün (6) | Paycom Center; 17,164 | 25–33 |
| 59 | February 29 | @ Phoenix | L 105–110 | Jalen Green (34) | Jabari Smith Jr. (16) | Fred VanVleet (5) | Footprint Center; 17,071 | 25–34 |

March : 13–2 (home: 6–2; road: 7–0)

| Game | Date | Team | Score | High points | High rebounds | High assists | Location Attendance | Record |
|---|---|---|---|---|---|---|---|---|
| 60 | March 2 | @ Phoenix | W 118–109 | Jalen Green (34) | Alperen Şengün (10) | Fred VanVleet (11) | Footprint Center; 17,071 | 26–34 |
| 61 | March 5 | San Antonio | W 114–101 | Alperen Şengün (45) | Alperen Şengün (16) | Fred VanVleet (10) | Toyota Center; 16,734 | 27–34 |
| 62 | March 6 | L.A. Clippers | L 116–122 | Alperen Şengün (23) | Alperen Şengün (19) | Alperen Şengün (14) | Toyota Center; 17,033 | 27–35 |
| 63 | March 8 | @ Portland | W 123–107 | Jalen Green (27) | Şengün, Smith Jr. (9) | Fred VanVleet (10) | Moda Center; 18,139 | 28–35 |
| 64 | March 10 | @ Sacramento | W 112–104 | Fred VanVleet (22) | Jabari Smith Jr. (11) | Fred VanVleet (9) | Golden 1 Center; 18,022 | 29–35 |
| 65 | March 12 | @ San Antonio | W 103–101 | Fred VanVleet (21) | Jabari Smith Jr. (9) | Fred VanVleet (7) | Frost Bank Center; 18,751 | 30–35 |
| 66 | March 14 | Washington | W 135–119 | Jalen Green (37) | Amen Thompson (10) | Fred VanVleet (9) | Toyota Center; 18,055 | 31–35 |
| 67 | March 16 | Cleveland | W 117–103 | Jalen Green (26) | Jalen Green (11) | Fred VanVleet (16) | Toyota Center; 18,055 | 32–35 |
| 68 | March 19 | @ Washington | W 137–114 | Jalen Green (42) | Jabari Smith Jr. (14) | Fred VanVleet (11) | Capital One Arena; 14,137 | 33–35 |
| 69 | March 21 | Chicago | W 127–117 | Jalen Green (26) | Jock Landale (12) | Fred VanVleet (12) | Toyota Center; 17,016 | 34–35 |
| 70 | March 23 | Utah | W 147–119 | Jalen Green (41) | Amen Thompson (10) | Fred VanVleet (7) | Toyota Center; 18,055 | 35–35 |
| 71 | March 25 | Portland | W 110–92 | Jalen Green (27) | Landale, Thompson (9) | Holiday, VanVleet (4) | Toyota Center; 16,537 | 36–35 |
| 72 | March 27 | @ Oklahoma City | W 132–126 (OT) | Jalen Green (37) | Amen Thompson (15) | Jalen Green (7) | Paycom Center; 17,438 | 37–35 |
| 73 | March 29 | @ Utah | W 101–100 | Jalen Green (34) | Amen Thompson (14) | Green, VanVleet (6) | Delta Center; 18,206 | 38–35 |
| 74 | March 31 | Dallas | L 107–125 | Jabari Smith Jr. (28) | Smith Jr., Thompson (7) | Fred VanVleet (7) | Toyota Center; 18,055 | 38–36 |

April: 3–5 (home: 1–2; road: 2–3)

| Game | Date | Team | Score | High points | High rebounds | High assists | Location Attendance | Record |
|---|---|---|---|---|---|---|---|---|
| 75 | April 2 | @ Minnesota | L 106–113 | Jalen Green (26) | Amen Thompson (9) | Jalen Green (6) | Target Center; 18,024 | 38–37 |
| 76 | April 4 | Golden State | L 110–133 | Jabari Smith Jr. (24) | Jock Landale (6) | Fred VanVleet (9) | Toyota Center; 18,055 | 38–38 |
| 77 | April 5 | Miami | L 104–119 | Jalen Green (21) | Jabari Smith Jr. (8) | Fred VanVleet (8) | Toyota Center; 18,055 | 38–39 |
| 78 | April 7 | @ Dallas | L 136–147 (OT) | Dillon Brooks (29) | Jabari Smith Jr. (9) | Fred VanVleet (12) | American Airlines Center; 20,317 | 38–40 |
| 79 | April 9 | Orlando | W 118–106 | Fred VanVleet (37) | Thompson, VanVleet (8) | Fred VanVleet (6) | Toyota Center; 18,055 | 39–40 |
| 80 | April 11 | @ Utah | L 121–124 | Fred VanVleet (42) | Amen Thompson (10) | Fred VanVleet (7) | Delta Center; 18,206 | 39–41 |
| 81 | April 12 | @ Portland | W 116–107 | Jalen Green (26) | Amen Thompson (15) | Amen Thompson (6) | Moda Center; 18,630 | 40–41 |
| 82 | April 14 | @ L.A. Clippers | W 116–105 | Cam Whitmore (21) | Amen Thompson (11) | Amen Thompson (10) | Crypto.com Arena; 19,370 | 41–41 |

2023–24 season schedule

=== In-Season Tournament ===
This was the first regular season where all the NBA teams competed in a mid-season tournament setting due to the implementation of the 2023 NBA In-Season Tournament. During the in-season tournament period, the Rockets competed in Group B of the Western Conference, which included the Denver Nuggets, the Los Angeles Clippers, the New Orleans Pelicans, and the Dallas Mavericks.

==== West group B ====
| Pos | Team | Pld | W | L | PF | PA | PD | Qualification | NOP | HOU | DAL | DEN | LAC |
|---|---|---|---|---|---|---|---|---|---|---|---|---|---|
| 1 | New Orleans Pelicans | 4 | 3 | 1 | 463 | 430 | +33 | Advance to knockout stage | — | 101–104 | 131–110 | 115–110 | 116–106 |
| 2 | Houston Rockets | 4 | 2 (Note: Tied on head-to-head results. Overall point difference is used as the tiebreaker.) | 2 | 424 | 414 | +10 | | 104–101 | — | 115–121 | 105–86 | 100–106 |
| 3 | Dallas Mavericks | 4 | 2 | 2 | 489 | 497 | −8 | | 110–131 | 121–115 | — | 114–125 | 144–126 |
| 4 | Denver Nuggets | 4 | 2 | 2 | 432 | 442 | −10 | | 110–115 | 86–105 | 125–114 | — | 111–108 |
| 5 | Los Angeles Clippers | 4 | 1 | 3 | 446 | 471 | −25 | | 106–116 | 106–100 | 126–144 | 108–111 | — |

Source: NBA
Rules for classification: Tiebreakers

== Player statistics ==
Legend
| GP | Games played | GS | Games started | MPG | Minutes per game |
| FG% | Field-goal percentage | 3P% | 3-point field-goal percentage | FT% | Free-throw percentage |
| RPG | Rebounds per game | APG | Assists per game | SPG | Steals per game |
| BPG | Blocks per game | PPG | Points per game |

=== Regular season ===
Houston Rockets statistics
| Player | GP | GS | MPG | FG% | 3P% | FT% | RPG | APG | SPG | BPG | PPG |
|---|---|---|---|---|---|---|---|---|---|---|---|
| Dillon Brooks | 72 | 72 | 30.9 | .428 | .359 | .844 | 3.4 | 1.7 | .9 | .1 | 12.7 |
| Reggie Bullock | 44 | 0 | 9.5 | .415 | .403 | 1.000 | 1.7 | .3 | .3 | .1 | 2.2 |
| Tari Eason | 22 | 0 | 21.8 | .466 | .360 | .636 | 7.0 | 1.2 | 1.4 | .9 | 9.8 |
| Jalen Green | 82 | 82 | 31.7 | .423 | .332 | .804 | 5.2 | 3.5 | .8 | .3 | 19.6 |
| Jeff Green | 78 | 6 | 16.8 | .456 | .331 | .819 | 2.3 | .9 | .2 | .4 | 6.5 |
| Nate Hinton | 15 | 0 | 5.0 | .423 | .500 | .800 | 1.5 | .7 | .2 | .1 | 2.2 |
| Aaron Holiday | 78 | 1 | 16.3 | .446 | .387 | .921 | 1.6 | 1.8 | .5 | .1 | 6.6 |
| Jock Landale | 56 | 3 | 13.6 | .515 | .250 | .800 | 3.1 | 1.2 | .4 | .6 | 4.9 |
| Boban Marjanović | 14 | 0 | 5.1 | .529 | .000 | .643 | 2.3 | .4 | .1 | .1 | 3.2 |
| Jermaine Samuels | 14 | 0 | 4.3 | .643 | .000 | 1.000 | .9 | .2 | .1 | .1 | 1.4 |
| Alperen Şengün | 63 | 63 | 32.5 | .537 | .297 | .693 | 9.3 | 5.0 | 1.2 | .7 | 21.1 |
| Jabari Smith Jr. | 76 | 76 | 31.9 | .454 | .363 | .811 | 8.1 | 1.6 | .7 | .8 | 13.7 |
| Jae'Sean Tate | 65 | 9 | 15.9 | .472 | .299 | .667 | 3.0 | 1.0 | .6 | .2 | 4.1 |
| Amen Thompson | 62 | 23 | 22.4 | .536 | .138 | .684 | 6.6 | 2.6 | 1.3 | .6 | 9.5 |
| Fred VanVleet | 73 | 73 | 36.8 | .416 | .387 | .860 | 3.8 | 8.1 | 1.4 | .8 | 17.4 |
| Cam Whitmore | 47 | 2 | 18.7 | .454 | .359 | .679 | 3.8 | .7 | .6 | .4 | 12.3 |
| Nate Williams | 22 | 0 | 5.9 | .540 | .400 | .538 | 1.0 | .3 | .2 | .0 | 2.9 |

== Transactions ==
=== Free agency ===
==== Re-signed ====
| Player | Signed | Ref. |

==== Additions ====
| Date | Player | Former team | Ref. |
|---|---|---|---|
| July 6 | Jock Landale | Phoenix Suns | |
| July 7 | Fred VanVleet | Toronto Raptors | |
| July 7 | Jeff Green | Denver Nuggets | |
| July 10 | Aaron Holiday | Atlanta Hawks | |

==== Subtractions ====
| Date | Player | Reason left | New team | Ref. |
