= 2023–24 Los Angeles Clippers season =

- Division champions
- Head coach: Tyronn Lue
- General manager: Trent Redden
- Owner: Steve Ballmer
- Arena: Crypto.com Arena

Results
- Record: 51–31 (.622)
- Place: Division: 1st (Pacific); Conference: 4th (Western)
- Playoff finish: First round (lost to Mavericks 2–4)
- Stats at Basketball Reference

Local media
- Television: Bally Sports West; Bally Sports SoCal; KTLA
- Radio: KLAC

The 2023–24 Los Angeles Clippers season was the 54th season of the franchise in the National Basketball Association (NBA), their 46th season in Southern California and their 40th season in Los Angeles. This was also the Clippers' final season at the Crypto.com Arena, as the team moved to the new Intuit Dome in Inglewood, California starting in the 2024–25 season.

Into the start of the 2023–24 season, the Clippers acquired 10-time NBA All-Star and 2018 League MVP James Harden in a blockbuster trade on November 1, 2023. The acquisition reunited him with former Oklahoma City Thunder and Houston Rockets teammate Russell Westbrook in addition to Harden being added along to perennial All-Stars Kawhi Leonard and Paul George to form a new superteam in the West. The trade also set a new aggregate All-Star milestone spanning 32 All-Star appearances totaled between that of George, Harden, Leonard and Westbrook. In the ensuing aftermath of the transaction, the Clippers were heavily criticized for refusing to deal Terance Mann as part of the agreement in a do-or-die season where they were at risk of losing all their All-Stars to free agency prior to the move to the new arena next season. What was initially expected to commence of as a highly promising start into the 2023–24 season in October that saw Clippers attain a 3–1 record, the team suffered a regrettable succession of six consecutive losses. As the series of unfortunate streak of defeats between November 1 to November 14 unfolded following a favorable beginning to the season in October, the Clippers finally managed to break their unfortunate string of ill-fated losses by securing a triumphant win over the Houston Rockets on November 17, 2023.

Since December, the Clippers emerged as a formidable force in the league, commencing with a remarkable 9-game winning streak characterized by several lopsided victories. Their ascent led them to establish themselves as one of the top teams in the Western Conference. Securing their 2nd consecutive playoff berth, the Clippers also clinched their first division title for the first time since 2014 while also achieving a milestone of 50 wins for the first time since 2017. Despite the team's strong performance in the regular season, the Clippers witnessed a disheartening premature First Round exit from the playoffs for the second consecutive year, this time falling to the Luka Dončić and Kyrie Irving-led Dallas Mavericks in a six-game series.

The Los Angeles Clippers drew an average home attendance of 18,945 in 41 home games in the 2023-24 NBA season.

== Draft ==
2023–24 Los Angeles Clippers season draft picks
Round	Pick	Player	Position	Nationality	College / Club
1	30	Kobe Brown	SG/SF	United States	Missouri (Sr.)
2	48	Jordan Miller	SF	United States	Miami (FL)

The Clippers entered this draft with a first round pick and a second round pick, the former of which was originally owned by the Milwaukee Bucks and acquired via pick swap with the Houston Rockets in 2023. Such pick swap was successfully exercised because the Oklahoma City Thunder made the 2023 NBA playoffs, landing their draft pick outside of the Top 6 protection range and eliminating them from the least favorable selection process.

== Roster ==
2023–24 Los Angeles Clippers roster
Players

Pos.	No.	Player	Height	Weight	DOB	From
G	4	Brandon Boston Jr.	6 ft 6 in (1.98 m)	188 lb (85 kg)	2001-11-28	Kentucky
F	21	Kobe Brown	6 ft 8 in (2.03 m)	250 lb (113 kg)	2000-01-01	Missouri
G/F	7	Amir Coffey	6 ft 7 in (2.01 m)	210 lb (95 kg)	1997-06-17	Minnesota
C	25	Moussa Diabaté (TW)	6 ft 11 in (2.11 m)	210 lb (95 kg)	2002-01-21	Michigan
F	13	Paul George	6 ft 8 in (2.03 m)	220 lb (100 kg)	1990-05-02	Fresno State
G	1	James Harden	6 ft 5 in (1.96 m)	220 lb (100 kg)	1989-08-26	Arizona State
G	5	Bones Hyland	6 ft 2 in (1.88 m)	173 lb (78 kg)	2000-09-14	VCU
F/C	23	Kai Jones	6 ft 11 in (2.11 m)	221 lb (100 kg)	2001-01-19	Texas
F	2	Kawhi Leonard	6 ft 7 in (2.01 m)	225 lb (102 kg)	1991-06-29	San Diego State
G/F	14	Terance Mann	6 ft 5 in (1.96 m)	215 lb (98 kg)	1996-10-18	Florida State
F	11	Jordan Miller (TW)	6 ft 7 in (2.01 m)	195 lb (88 kg)	2000-01-23	Miami (FL)
G	22	Xavier Moon (TW)	6 ft 2 in (1.88 m)	165 lb (75 kg)	1995-01-02	Morehead State
F/C	44	Mason Plumlee	7 ft 0 in (2.13 m)	254 lb (115 kg)	1990-03-05	Duke
G	24	Norman Powell	6 ft 4 in (1.93 m)	215 lb (98 kg)	1993-05-25	UCLA
F/C	10	Daniel Theis	6 ft 8 in (2.03 m)	245 lb (111 kg)	1992-04-04	Germany
F	17	P. J. Tucker	6 ft 5 in (1.96 m)	245 lb (111 kg)	1985-05-05	Texas
G	0	Russell Westbrook	6 ft 4 in (1.93 m)	200 lb (91 kg)	1988-11-12	UCLA
C	40	Ivica Zubac	7 ft 0 in (2.13 m)	240 lb (109 kg)	1997-03-18	Croatia

Coaches
Head coach
- Tyronn Lue
Assistant(s)
- Jeremy Castleberry
- Dan Craig (associate HC)
- Larry Drew
- Shaun Fein
- Dahntay Jones
- Jay Larranaga
- Brendan O'Connor
- Brian Shaw

Legend
- (DP) Unsigned draft pick
- (FA) Free agent
- (S) Suspended
- (GL) On assignment to G League affiliate
- (TW) Two-way affiliate player
- Injured

Roster
Updated: April 13, 2024

== Standings ==
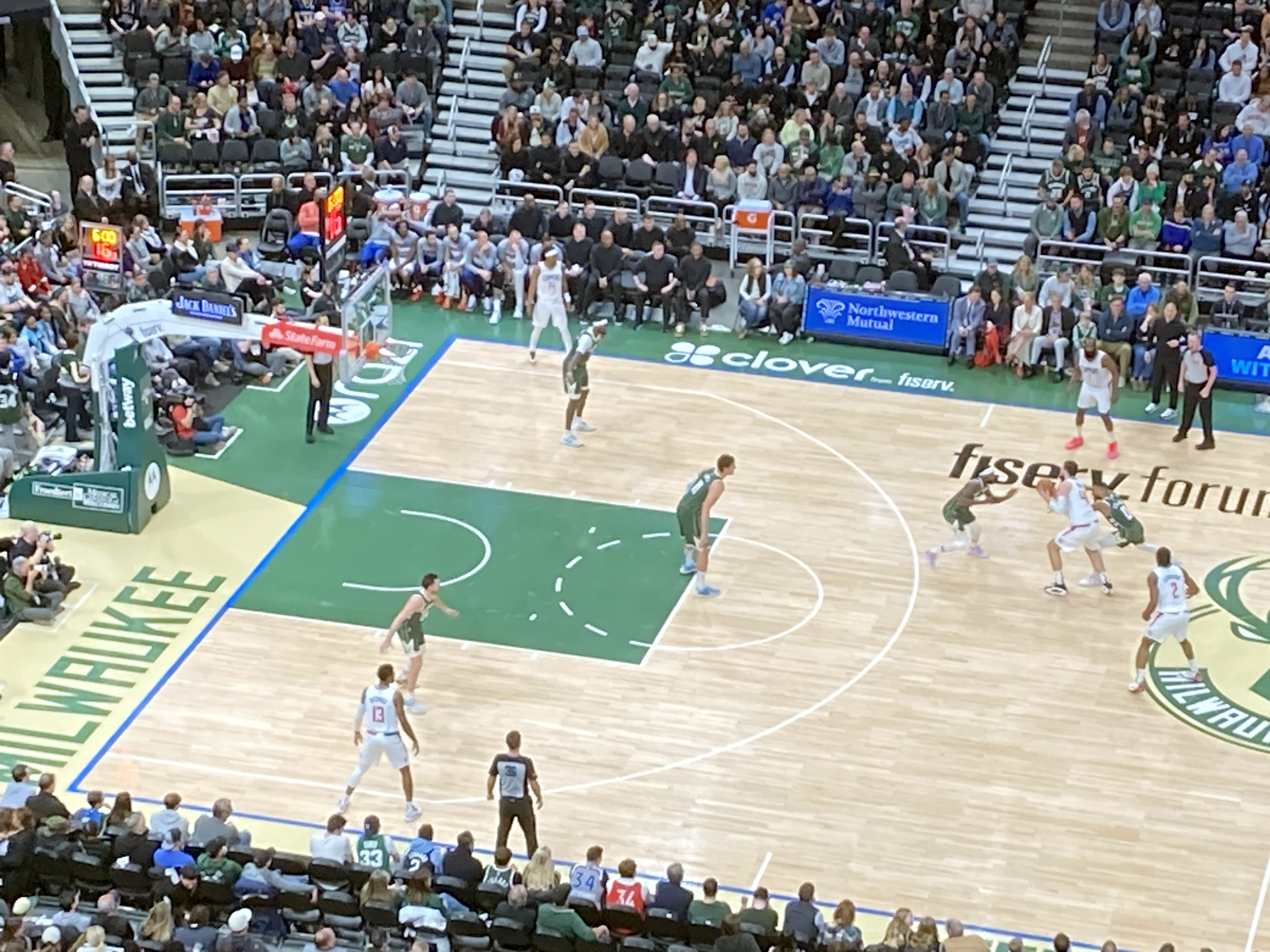
The Clippers playing against the Milwaukee Bucks

=== Division ===
Pacific Division	W	L	PCT	GB	Home	Road	Div	GP
y – Los Angeles Clippers	51	31	.622	–	25‍–‍16	26‍–‍15	9‍–‍7	82
x – Phoenix Suns	49	33	.598	2.0	25‍–‍16	24‍–‍17	9‍–‍9	82
x – Los Angeles Lakers	47	35	.573	4.0	28‍–‍14	19‍–‍21	7‍–‍10	82
pi – Sacramento Kings	46	36	.561	5.0	24‍–‍17	22‍–‍19	10‍–‍7	82
pi – Golden State Warriors	46	36	.561	5.0	21‍–‍20	25‍–‍16	7‍–‍9	82

=== Conference ===
Western Conference
#	Team	W	L	PCT	GB	GP
1	c – Oklahoma City Thunder *	57	25	.695	–	82
2	x – Denver Nuggets	57	25	.695	–	82
3	x – Minnesota Timberwolves	56	26	.683	1.0	82
4	y – Los Angeles Clippers *	51	31	.622	6.0	82
5	y – Dallas Mavericks *	50	32	.610	7.0	82
6	x – Phoenix Suns	49	33	.598	8.0	82
7	x – New Orleans Pelicans	49	33	.598	8.0	82
8	x – Los Angeles Lakers	47	35	.573	10.0	82
9	pi – Sacramento Kings	46	36	.561	11.0	82
10	pi – Golden State Warriors	46	36	.561	11.0	82
11	Houston Rockets	41	41	.500	16.0	82
12	Utah Jazz	31	51	.378	26.0	82
13	Memphis Grizzlies	27	55	.329	30.0	82
14	San Antonio Spurs	22	60	.268	35.0	82
15	Portland Trail Blazers	21	61	.256	36.0	82

== Game log ==
=== Preseason ===
2023 preseason game log
Total: 2–2 (Home: 2–2; Road: 0–0)
Preseason: 2–2 (home: 2–2; road: 0–0)

Game	Date	Team	Score	High points	High rebounds	High assists	Location Attendance	Record
1	October 8	Utah	L 96–101	Bones Hyland (18)	Diabaté, Martin Jr. (8)	Hyland, Moon (4)	Stan Sheriff Center; 10,263	0–1
2	October 10	Utah	W 103–98	Kawhi Leonard (16)	Moussa Diabaté (6)	Paul George (5)	Climate Pledge Arena; 18,100	1–1
3	October 17	Denver	W 116–103	Paul George (23)	Ivica Zubac (8)	Russell Westbrook (7)	Crypto.com Arena; 16,182	2–1
4	October 19	Denver	L 90–103	Bones Hyland (25)	Ivica Zubac (10)	Bones Hyland (6)	Crypto.com Arena; 15,007	2–2

2023–24 preseason schedule

=== Regular season ===
2023–24 game log
Total: 51–31 (Home: 25–16; Road: 26–15)
October: 3–1 (home: 3–0; road: 0–1)

Game	Date	Team	Score	High points	High rebounds	High assists	Location Attendance	Record
1	October 25	Portland	W 123–111	Paul George (27)	Ivica Zubac (12)	Russell Westbrook (13)	Crypto.com Arena; 19,370	1–0
2	October 27	@ Utah	L 118–120	Paul George (36)	Leonard, Westbrook (9)	Kawhi Leonard (5)	Delta Center; 18,206	1–1
3	October 29	San Antonio	W 123–83	Kawhi Leonard (21)	Westbrook, Zubac (8)	Paul George (5)	Crypto.com Arena; 19,370	2–1
4	October 31	Orlando	W 118–102	Paul George (27)	Ivica Zubac (9)	George, Westbrook (7)	Crypto.com Arena; 14,014	3–1

November: 5–9 (home: 2–3; road: 3–6)

Game	Date	Team	Score	High points	High rebounds	High assists	Location Attendance	Record
5	November 1	@ L.A. Lakers	L 125–130 (OT)	Kawhi Leonard (38)	Russell Westbrook (11)	Russell Westbrook (8)	Crypto.com Arena; 18,997	3–2
6	November 6	@ New York	L 97–111	Kawhi Leonard (18)	George, Zubac (7)	James Harden (6)	Madison Square Garden; 19,812	3–3
7	November 8	@ Brooklyn	L 93–100	Paul George (24)	Ivica Zubac (10)	Russell Westbrook (8)	Barclays Center; 17,933	3–4
8	November 10	@ Dallas	L 126–144	Kawhi Leonard (26)	Moussa Diabaté (10)	Bones Hyland (6)	American Airlines Center; 20,377	3–5
9	November 12	Memphis	L 101–105	Paul George (26)	Russell Westbrook (9)	Paul George (7)	Crypto.com Arena; 17,220	3–6
10	November 14	@ Denver	L 108–111	Paul George (35)	Ivica Zubac (13)	Terance Mann (5)	Ball Arena; 19,661	3–7
11	November 17	Houston	W 106–100	Kawhi Leonard (26)	James Harden (9)	James Harden (7)	Crypto.com Arena; 19,370	4–7
12	November 20	@ San Antonio	W 124–99	Paul George (28)	Ivica Zubac (11)	James Harden (10)	Frost Bank Center; 18,354	5–7
13	November 22	@ San Antonio	W 109–102	Kawhi Leonard (26)	Daniel Theis (11)	James Harden (9)	Frost Bank Center; 18,354	6–7
14	November 24	New Orleans	L 106–116	Paul George (34)	George, Leonard (8)	James Harden (10)	Crypto.com Arena; 19,370	6–8
15	November 25	Dallas	W 107–88	Paul George (25)	Ivica Zubac (14)	Harden, Westbrook (7)	Crypto.com Arena; 19,370	7–8
16	November 27	Denver	L 104–113	Kawhi Leonard (31)	Ivica Zubac (14)	George, Harden (4)	Crypto.com Arena; 17,071	7–9
17	November 29	@ Sacramento	W 131–117	Kawhi Leonard (34)	Kawhi Leonard (9)	Russell Westbrook (8)	Golden 1 Center; 17,829	8–9
18	November 30	@ Golden State	L 114–120	Kawhi Leonard (23)	Ivica Zubac (13)	Paul George (10)	Chase Center; 18,064	8–10

December : 11–2 (home: 8–1; road: 3–1)

Game	Date	Team	Score	High points	High rebounds	High assists	Location Attendance	Record
19	December 2	Golden State	W 113–112	Paul George (25)	Kawhi Leonard (8)	James Harden (9)	Crypto.com Arena; 19,370	9–10
20	December 6	Denver	W 111–102	Paul George (25)	Daniel Theis (11)	James Harden (11)	Crypto.com Arena; 16,365	10–10
21	December 8	@ Utah	W 117–103	Kawhi Leonard (41)	Ivica Zubac (12)	James Harden (8)	Delta Center; 18,206	11–10
22	December 11	Portland	W 132–127	Kawhi Leonard (34)	Paul George (8)	Paul George (8)	Crypto.com Arena; 17,102	12–10
23	December 12	Sacramento	W 119–99	Kawhi Leonard (31)	Ivica Zubac (9)	James Harden (7)	Crypto.com Arena; 17,060	13–10
24	December 14	Golden State	W 121–113	James Harden (28)	Leonard, Zubac (8)	James Harden (15)	Crypto.com Arena; 19,370	14–10
25	December 16	New York	W 144–122	Kawhi Leonard (36)	Ivica Zubac (11)	James Harden (12)	Crypto.com Arena; 19,370	15–10
26	December 18	@ Indiana	W 151–127	James Harden (35)	Ivica Zubac (16)	James Harden (9)	Gainbridge Fieldhouse; 16,665	16–10
27	December 20	@ Dallas	W 120–111	Kawhi Leonard (30)	Kawhi Leonard (10)	James Harden (11)	American Airlines Center; 20,310	17–10
28	December 21	@ Oklahoma City	L 115–134	James Harden (23)	Russell Westbrook (13)	James Harden (6)	Paycom Center; 18,203	17–11
29	December 23	Boston	L 108–145	Paul George (21)	Ivica Zubac (10)	James Harden (9)	Crypto.com Arena; 19,370	17–12
30	December 26	Charlotte	W 113–104	James Harden (29)	Ivica Zubac (14)	James Harden (8)	Crypto.com Arena; 19,370	18–12
31	December 29	Memphis	W 117–106	Paul George (23)	Ivica Zubac (20)	James Harden (13)	Crypto.com Arena; 19,370	19–12

January: 12–3 (home: 6–0; road: 6–3)

Game	Date	Team	Score	High points	High rebounds	High assists	Location Attendance	Record
32	January 1	Miami	W 121–104	Kawhi Leonard (24)	Ivica Zubac (12)	James Harden (10)	Crypto.com Arena; 19,370	20–12
33	January 3	@ Phoenix	W 131–122	Paul George (33)	Kawhi Leonard (8)	James Harden (11)	Footprint Center; 17,071	21–12
34	January 5	@ New Orleans	W 111–95	Paul George (24)	Kawhi Leonard (9)	James Harden (13)	Smoothie King Center; 18,329	22–12
35	January 7	@ L.A. Lakers	L 103–106	George, Zubac (22)	Ivica Zubac (19)	James Harden (9)	Crypto.com Arena; 18,997	22–13
36	January 8	Phoenix	W 138–111	Paul George (25)	Ivica Zubac (8)	James Harden (10)	Crypto.com Arena; 19,370	23–13
37	January 10	Toronto	W 126–120	George, Leonard (29)	Ivica Zubac (11)	James Harden (11)	Crypto.com Arena; 19,370	24–13
38	January 12	@ Memphis	W 128–119	Paul George (37)	Ivica Zubac (11)	James Harden (9)	FedExForum; 16,617	25–13
39	January 14	@ Minnesota	L 105–109	Kawhi Leonard (26)	Kawhi Leonard (9)	Russell Westbrook (13)	Target Center; 18,024	25–14
40	January 16	Oklahoma City	W 128–117	Paul George (38)	Daniel Theis (8)	James Harden (8)	Crypto.com Arena; 19,370	26–14
41	January 21	Brooklyn	W 125–114	James Harden (24)	Russell Westbrook (9)	James Harden (10)	Crypto.com Arena; 19,370	27–14
42	January 23	L.A. Lakers	W 127–116	Kawhi Leonard (25)	Kawhi Leonard (11)	Harden, Leonard (10)	Crypto.com Arena; 19,370	28–14
43	January 26	@ Toronto	W 127–107	James Harden (22)	Mason Plumlee (12)	James Harden (13)	Scotiabank Arena; 16,988	29–14
44	January 27	@ Boston	W 115–96	Kawhi Leonard (26)	James Harden (8)	James Harden (7)	TD Garden; 18,500	30–14
45	January 29	@ Cleveland	L 108–118	Kawhi Leonard (30)	Kawhi Leonard (8)	James Harden (10)	Rocket Mortgage FieldHouse; 19,432	30–15
46	January 31	@ Washington	W 125–109	Kawhi Leonard (31)	Mason Plumlee (11)	Russell Westbrook (7)	Capital One Arena; 17,201	31–15

February: 6–5 (home: 1–4; road: 5–1)

Game	Date	Team	Score	High points	High rebounds	High assists	Location Attendance	Record
47	February 2	@ Detroit	W 136–125	Kawhi Leonard (33)	Mason Plumlee (9)	Russell Westbrook (9)	Little Caesars Arena; 18,993	32–15
48	February 4	@ Miami	W 103–95	Kawhi Leonard (25)	Kawhi Leonard (11)	James Harden (11)	Kaseya Center; 19,855	33–15
49	February 5	@ Atlanta	W 149–144	Kawhi Leonard (36)	Mason Plumlee (9)	James Harden (10)	State Farm Arena; 18,850	34–15
50	February 7	New Orleans	L 106–117	James Harden (19)	Harden, Zubac (8)	James Harden (5)	Crypto.com Arena; 19,370	34–16
51	February 10	Detroit	W 112–106	Paul George (33)	James Harden (6)	James Harden (8)	Crypto.com Arena; 19,370	35–16
52	February 12	Minnesota	L 100–121	George, Leonard (18)	Ivica Zubac (11)	James Harden (6)	Crypto.com Arena; 19,370	35–17
53	February 14	@ Golden State	W 130–125	James Harden (26)	Ivica Zubac (8)	James Harden (7)	Chase Center; 18,990	36–17
All-Star Game
54	February 22	@ Oklahoma City	L 107–129	Kawhi Leonard (20)	Ivica Zubac (12)	George, Mann (6)	Paycom Center; 18,203	36–18
55	February 23	@ Memphis	W 101–95	Kawhi Leonard (24)	Terance Mann (12)	James Harden (8)	FedExForum; 17,255	37–18
56	February 25	Sacramento	L 107–123	Norman Powell (21)	Kawhi Leonard (8)	James Harden (8)	Crypto.com Arena; 19,370	37–19
57	February 28	L.A. Lakers	L 112–116	Kawhi Leonard (26)	Kawhi Leonard (7)	James Harden (9)	Crypto.com Arena; 19,370	37–20

March : 10–7 (home: 2–5; road: 8–2)

Game	Date	Team	Score	High points	High rebounds	High assists	Location Attendance	Record
58	March 1	Washington	W 140–115	James Harden (28)	Mason Plumlee (10)	James Harden (8)	Crypto.com Arena; 19,370	38–20
59	March 3	@ Minnesota	W 89–88	Kawhi Leonard (32)	Daniel Theis (13)	James Harden (10)	Target Center; 18,024	39–20
60	March 4	@ Milwaukee	L 106–113	George, Harden (29)	Ivica Zubac (11)	James Harden (8)	Fiserv Forum; 17,875	39–21
61	March 6	@ Houston	W 122–116	Kawhi Leonard (28)	Mason Plumlee (11)	Harden, Leonard (7)	Toyota Center; 17,033	40–21
62	March 9	Chicago	W 112–102	Paul George (22)	James Harden (11)	James Harden (10)	Crypto.com Arena; 19,370	41–21
63	March 10	Milwaukee	L 117–124	Norman Powell (26)	Amir Coffey (10)	James Harden (11)	Crypto.com Arena; 19,370	41–22
64	March 12	Minnesota	L 100–118	Paul George (22)	Ivica Zubac (8)	James Harden (7)	Crypto.com Arena; 19,370	41–23
65	March 14	@ Chicago	W 126–111	Paul George (28)	Ivica Zubac (8)	Bones Hyland (11)	United Center; 21,219	42–23
66	March 15	@ New Orleans	L 104–112	Paul George (26)	Ivica Zubac (11)	Paul George (6)	Smoothie King Center; 18,865	42–24
67	March 17	Atlanta	L 93–110	Kawhi Leonard (28)	George, Harden, Zubac (6)	James Harden (9)	Crypto.com Arena; 19,370	42–25
68	March 20	@ Portland	W 116–103	Paul George (27)	Ivica Zubac (9)	James Harden (14)	Moda Center; 17,504	43–25
69	March 22	@ Portland	W 125–117	Paul George (31)	Ivica Zubac (8)	James Harden (10)	Moda Center; 18,660	44–25
70	March 24	Philadelphia	L 107–121	Leonard, Powell (20)	Ivica Zubac (10)	James Harden (14)	Crypto.com Arena; 19,370	44–26
71	March 25	Indiana	L 116–133	George, Leonard (26)	Ivica Zubac (11)	Westbrook, Harden (7)	Crypto.com Arena; 19,370	44–27
72	March 27	@ Philadelphia	W 108–107	Paul George (22)	Paul George (10)	James Harden (14)	Wells Fargo Center; 21,022	45–27
73	March 29	@ Orlando	W 100–97	Kawhi Leonard (29)	Kawhi Leonard (11)	Leonard, Westbrook (5)	Kia Center; 19,452	46–27
74	March 31	@ Charlotte	W 130–118	Paul George (41)	Ivica Zubac (12)	James Harden (10)	Spectrum Center; 15,941	47–27

April: 4–4 (home: 3–3; road: 1–1)

Game	Date	Team	Score	High points	High rebounds	High assists	Location Attendance	Record
75	April 2	@ Sacramento	L 95–109	Russell Westbrook (20)	Ivica Zubac (11)	James Harden (8)	Golden 1 Center; 17,832	47–28
76	April 4	Denver	W 102–100	Paul George (28)	Ivica Zubac (15)	James Harden (8)	Crypto.com Arena; 19,370	48–28
77	April 5	Utah	W 131–102	Terance Mann (19)	Harden, Zubac (10)	James Harden (15)	Crypto.com Arena; 19,370	49–28
78	April 7	Cleveland	W 120–118	Paul George (39)	George, Zubac (11)	Paul George (7)	Crypto.com Arena; 19,370	50–28
79	April 9	@ Phoenix	W 105–92	Paul George (23)	Russell Westbrook (15)	Russell Westbrook (15)	Footprint Center; 17,071	51–28
80	April 10	Phoenix	L 108–124	Bones Hyland (37)	Mason Plumlee (12)	Bones Hyland (9)	Crypto.com Arena; 19,370	51–29
81	April 12	Utah	L 109–110	Bones Hyland (20)	Daniel Theis (7)	Bones Hyland (6)	Crypto.com Arena; 19,370	51–30
82	April 14	Houston	L 105–116	Terance Mann (24)	Mason Plumlee (13)	Xavier Moon (6)	Crypto.com Arena; 19,370	51–31

2023–24 season schedule

=== Postseason ===
2024 playoff game log
Total: 2–4 (home: 1–2; road: 1–2)
First round: 2–4 (home: 1–2; road: 1–2)

Game	Date	Team	Score	High points	High rebounds	High assists	Location Attendance	Series
1	April 21	Dallas	W 109–97	James Harden (28)	Ivica Zubac (15)	James Harden (8)	Crypto.com Arena; 19,370	1–0
2	April 23	Dallas	L 93–96	George, Harden (22)	Ivica Zubac (12)	James Harden (8)	Crypto.com Arena; 19,370	1–1
3	April 26	@ Dallas	L 90–101	Harden, Powell (21)	Kawhi Leonard (9)	George, Harden (5)	American Airlines Center; 20,402	1–2
4	April 28	@ Dallas	W 116–111	George, Harden (33)	George, Harden (6)	Paul George (8)	American Airlines Center; 20,411	2–2
5	May 1	Dallas	L 93–123	George, Zubac (15)	Paul George (11)	James Harden (7)	Crypto.com Arena; 19,370	2–3
6	May 3	@ Dallas	L 101–114	Norman Powell (20)	George, Zubac (11)	James Harden (13)	American Airlines Center; 20,625	2–4

2024 playoff schedule

=== In-Season Tournament ===
This was the first regular season where all the NBA teams competed in a mid-season tournament setting due to the implementation of the 2023 NBA In-Season Tournament. During the in-season tournament period, the Clippers competed in Group B of the Western Conference, which included the defending champion Denver Nuggets, the New Orleans Pelicans, the Dallas Mavericks, and the Houston Rockets.

==== West group B ====
Pos	Team	Pld	W	L	PF	PA	PD	Qualification	NOP	HOU	DAL	DEN	LAC
1	New Orleans Pelicans	4	3	1	463	430	+33	Advance to knockout stage	—	101–104	131–110	115–110	116–106
2	Houston Rockets	4	2 (Note: Tied on head-to-head results. Overall point difference is used as the tiebreaker.)	2	424	414	+10		104–101	—	115–121	105–86	100–106
3	Dallas Mavericks	4	2	2	489	497	−8		110–131	121–115	—	114–125	144–126
4	Denver Nuggets	4	2	2	432	442	−10		110–115	86–105	125–114	—	111–108
5	Los Angeles Clippers	4	1	3	446	471	−25		106–116	106–100	126–144	108–111	—

Source: NBA
Rules for classification: Tiebreakers

== Player statistics ==
Legend
GP	Games played	GS	Games started	MPG	Minutes per game
FG%	Field-goal percentage	3P%	3-point field-goal percentage	FT%	Free-throw percentage
RPG	Rebounds per game	APG	Assists per game	SPG	Steals per game
BPG	Blocks per game	PPG	Points per game

=== Regular season ===
Player	GP	GS	MPG	FG%	3P%	FT%	RPG	APG	SPG	BPG	PPG
Nicolas Batum^{†}	3	0	18.0	.375	.286		2.3	1.7	1.0	1.3	2.7
Brandon Boston Jr.	32	0	10.8	.404	.269	.697	1.6	.4	.3	.3	5.2
Kobe Brown	44	0	9.0	.411	.292	.500	1.4	.6	.3	.1	2.0
Amir Coffey	70	13	20.9	.472	.380	.859	2.1	1.1	.6	.2	6.6
Robert Covington^{†}	3	3	23.0	.333	.250	.500	2.7	2.3	2.0	.7	3.0
Moussa Diabaté	11	0	5.8	.526		.643	2.2	.4	.5	.1	2.6
Paul George	74	74	33.8	.471	.413	.907	5.2	3.5	1.5	.5	22.6
James Harden	72	72	34.3	.428	.381	.878	5.1	8.5	1.1	.8	16.6
Bones Hyland	37	5	14.6	.386	.326	.783	1.5	2.5	.7	.1	6.9
Kawhi Leonard	68	68	34.3	.525	.417	.885	6.1	3.6	1.6	.9	23.7
Terance Mann	75	71	25.0	.515	.348	.832	3.4	1.6	.6	.2	8.8
Kenyon Martin Jr.^{†}	2	0	15.5	.400	.200	.500	1.5	.5	1.0	.5	5.0
Jordan Miller	8	0	3.5	.556	.500	1.000	.6	.0	.0	.0	1.6
Xavier Moon	14	1	8.5	.326	.118	.500	1.3	1.5	.2	.2	2.4
Mason Plumlee	46	11	14.7	.569	.000	.707	5.1	1.2	.3	.4	5.3
Norman Powell	76	3	26.2	.486	.435	.831	2.6	1.1	.6	.3	13.9
Joshua Primo	2	0	5.0	.333	.000		.5	.0	.0	.5	1.0
Daniel Theis^{†}	59	3	17.1	.536	.371	.760	4.1	1.0	.4	.9	6.3
P. J. Tucker^{†}	28	7	15.0	.356	.367	1.000	2.5	.6	.5	.2	1.6
Russell Westbrook	68	11	22.5	.454	.273	.688	5.0	4.5	1.1	.3	11.1
Ivica Zubac	68	68	26.4	.649		.723	9.2	1.4	.3	1.2	11.7

=== Playoffs ===
Player	GP	GS	MPG	FG%	3P%	FT%	RPG	APG	SPG	BPG	PPG
Brandon Boston Jr.	3	0	3.3	.500		.500	.7	.3	.0	.0	1.7
Kobe Brown	3	0	3.3				.7	.0	.0	.0	.0
Amir Coffey	6	3	18.7	.318	.273		1.7	.3	.3	.2	2.8
Paul George	6	6	37.0	.411	.367	.840	6.8	4.8	1.2	.5	19.5
James Harden	6	6	40.3	.449	.383	.906	4.5	8.0	1.0	1.0	21.2
Bones Hyland	3	0	4.0	.429	.200	1.000	.7	1.3	.0	.0	3.7
Kawhi Leonard	2	2	29.5	.458	.000	.667	8.0	2.0	2.0	.5	12.0
Terance Mann	6	6	31.2	.413	.455	1.000	5.0	1.8	.0	.0	9.3
Mason Plumlee	6	0	11.0	.389		.625	3.3	.7	.5	.3	3.2
Norman Powell	6	0	29.8	.426	.448	.800	2.8	.3	.5	.0	12.8
Daniel Theis	1	0	4.0	1.000	1.000		1.0	.0	.0	.0	3.0
P. J. Tucker	2	1	15.5	.667	.750		1.5	.0	.0	.0	5.5
Russell Westbrook	6	0	19.0	.260	.235	.615	4.2	1.7	1.2	.5	6.3
Ivica Zubac	6	6	32.0	.600		.650	9.3	1.0	.8	.5	16.2

- ^{†} Denotes player spent time with another team in the season. Stats reflect time with the Clippers only.

== Transactions ==
=== Trades ===
2023–24 Los Angeles Clippers season trades
July 8
To Los Angeles Clippers

Kenyon Martin Jr. (from Houston)
2026 right to swap second-round picks (from Houston)

To Houston Rockets

2026 LAC second-round pick
2027 MEM second-round pick
Dillon Brooks (sign-and-trade) (from Memphis)
Draft rights to Alpha Kaba (2017 No. 60) (from Atlanta)

To Memphis Grizzlies

Josh Christopher (from Houston)
Draft rights to Vanja Marinković (2019 No. 60) (from Los Angeles)

To Atlanta Hawks

Usman Garuba (from Houston)
TyTy Washington Jr. (from Houston)
2025 MIN second-round pick (from Houston)
2028 HOU second-round pick (from Houston)
Cash considerations (from Oklahoma City)

To Oklahoma City Thunder

Patty Mills (from Houston)
2024 HOU second-round pick (from Houston)
2029 HOU second-round pick (from Houston)
2030 HOU second-round pick (from Houston)

November 1
To Los Angeles Clippers

James Harden (from Philadelphia)
P.J. Tucker (from Philadelphia)
Filip Petrušev (from Philadelphia)

To Philadelphia 76ers

Nicolas Batum (from L.A. Clippers)
Robert Covington (from L.A. Clippers)
Marcus Morris (from L.A. Clippers)
Kenyon Martin Jr. (from L.A. Clippers)
2024 second-round pick (Note: The most favorable of the picks originally belonging to Cleveland, Indiana, Toronto, and Utah, unless the most favorable pick is that from Cleveland or Utah, in which case Philadelphia will receive the second-most favorable pick.)(from L.A. Clippers)
2026 first-round pick (Note: The least favorable of the first-round picks originally belonging to Houston (if No. 5–30), the Clippers and Oklahoma City.) (from Oklahoma City)
2028 LAC first-round pick (from L.A. Clippers)
2029 protected right to swap first-round picks (Note: Philadelphia may swap for the Clippers' pick if that pick is No. 4–30.) (from L.A. Clippers)
2029 LAC second-round pick (from L.A. Clippers)
Cash considerations (from L.A. Clippers)

To Oklahoma City Thunder

2027 first-round pick swap (Note: Oklahoma City can swap for Denver's pick (if No. 6–30) or the Clippers' pick.) (from L.A. Clippers)
Cash considerations (from L.A. Clippers)
November 1
To Los Angeles Clippers

Draft rights to Luka Mitrović
To Sacramento Kings

Filip Petrušev
Cash considerations

=== Free agency ===
==== Re-signed ====
Free agents resigned in the 2023–24 Los Angeles Clippers season
Date	Player	Ref.
July 7	Russell Westbrook	
July 7	Mason Plumlee	
October 2 October 21 (waived); November 7	Xavier Moon	

==== Additions ====
Free agents added in the 2023–24 Los Angeles Clippers season
Date	Player	Former team	Ref.
September 29	Joshua Primo	San Antonio Spurs	
November 17	Daniel Theis	Indiana Pacers	
April 13	Kai Jones	Delaware Blue Coats	

==== Subtractions ====
Free agent subtractions in the 2023–24 Los Angeles Clippers season
Date	Player	Reason left	New team(s)	Ref.
July 6	Eric Gordon	Free agency	Phoenix Suns	
October 1	Jason Preston	Waived	Memphis Grizzlies	
April 13	Joshua Primo	Waived	Chicago Bulls	
