= Jabari Smith Jr. =

American basketball player (born 2003)

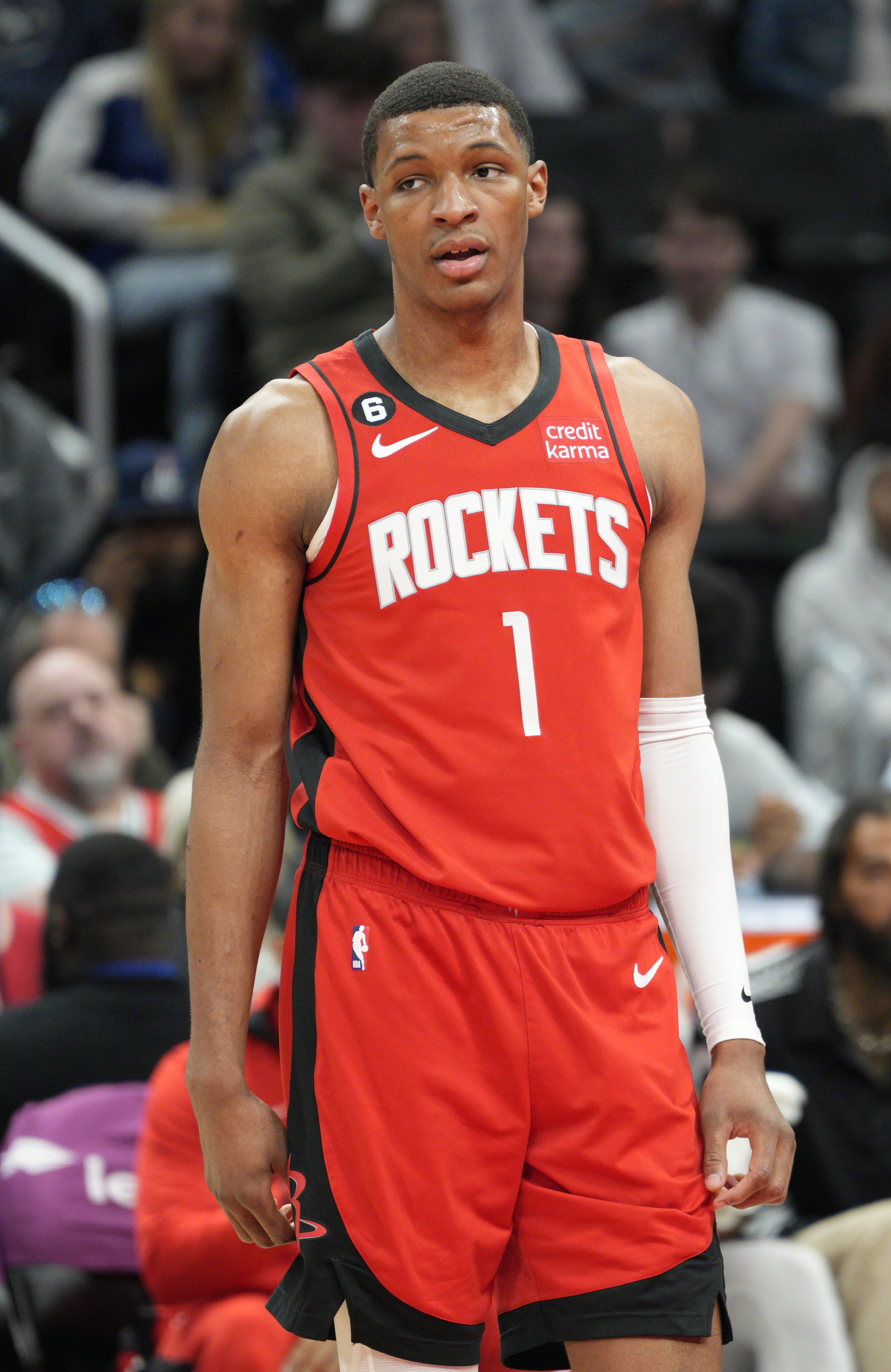
- Smith with the Houston Rockets in 2023

No. 10 – Houston Rockets
- Position: Power forward
- League: NBA

Personal information
- Born: May 13, 2003 (age 23) Fayetteville, Georgia, U.S.
- Listed height: 6 ft 11 in (2.11 m)
- Listed weight: 231 lb (105 kg)

Career information
- High school: Sandy Creek (Tyrone, Georgia)
- College: Auburn (2021–2022)
- NBA draft: 2022: 1st round, 3rd overall pick
- Drafted by: Houston Rockets
- Playing career: 2022–present

Career history
- 2022–present: Houston Rockets

Career highlights
- NBA All-Rookie Second Team (2023); Consensus second-team All-American (2022); Wayman Tisdale Award (2022); NABC Freshman of the Year (2022); First-team All-SEC (2022); SEC Freshman of the Year (2022); SEC All-Freshman Team (2022); McDonald's All-American (2021); Nike Hoop Summit (2021); Mr. Georgia Basketball (2021)
- Stats at NBA.com
- Stats at Basketball Reference
Medals
Men's basketball
Representing the United States
FIBA Americas Under-16 Championship
Gold medal – first place	2019 Brazil	Team

Jabari Montsho Smith Jr. (born May 13, 2003) is an American professional basketball player for the Houston Rockets of the National Basketball Association (NBA). He played college basketball for the Auburn Tigers.

Born in Fayetteville, Georgia, to former professional basketball player Jabari Smith Sr., Smith began playing basketball at a young age under his father's mentorship. Smith attended Sandy Creek High School, where in his senior year the team made a state championship appearance. In high school, Smith was named a McDonald's All-American and Mr. Georgia Basketball. A five star prospect ranked the nation's number seven overall recruit, he committed to Auburn University to play college basketball. As a freshman at Auburn, Smith helped the team achieve their first ever AP poll number one ranking and an Southeastern Conference (SEC) regular season championship. At the conclusion of his freshman year, Smith was named an All-American, and won the USBWA National Freshman of the Year Award. Following his freshman season, Smith would declare for the 2022 NBA draft and was selected by the Houston Rockets with the third overall pick. He is also a distant cousin of NBA player Kwame Brown.

== Early life ==
Smith was born on May 13, 2003, in Fayetteville, Georgia, to Jabari Smith Sr. and Taneskia Purnell. His father played college basketball at LSU, and had a four-year career in the National Basketball Association (NBA) for the Sacramento Kings, Philadelphia 76ers and New Jersey Nets, before playing overseas in Spain, Turkey, Iran and Puerto Rico. Smith began playing basketball when he was five, and was trained by his father. His father while in the NBA had noticed the arrival of tall international players with strong shooting, and decided to mold Smith as a player that despite his tall height, would win with shooting rather than with size. At the age of 15, Smith would join the Atlanta Celtics on the Amateur Athletic Union circuit, coached by the father of star Auburn point guard Jared Harper.

Smith started playing varsity basketball as a sophomore at Sandy Creek High School in Tyrone, Georgia. As a junior, he averaged 24.5 points, 10.8 rebounds, and 2.8 blocks per game. In his senior season, Smith averaged 24 points, 10 rebounds, three steals, and three blocks per game, leading his team to a Class 3A state runner-up finish. He was named Mr. Georgia Basketball, Georgia Gatorade Player of the Year and The Atlanta Journal-Constitution All-Classification Player of the Year. Smith was selected to the rosters for the McDonald's All-American Game, Jordan Brand Classic and Nike Hoop Summit and finished as a runner up for Mr. Basketball USA.

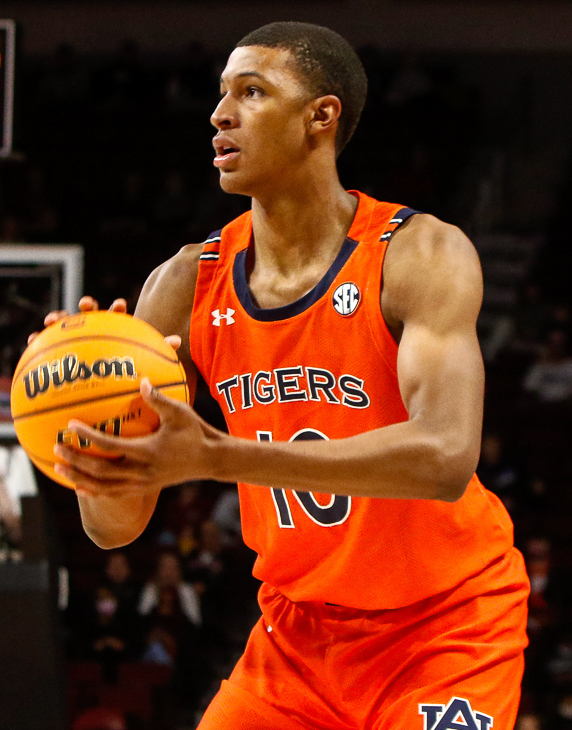
Smith with the Auburn Tigers in 2022

Smith was a consensus five-star recruit and one of the top players in the 2021 class. On October 9, 2020, he announced his commitment to play college basketball for Auburn University over offers from Tennessee, Georgia, LSU, Georgia Tech and North Carolina. Upon his commitment he became the highest ranked player to commit to Auburn in the modern recruiting era. Smith has said that he committed to Auburn due to his fit within the teams play style under head coach Bruce Pearl, the school's relatively close proximity to his hometown and because the school could provide him a more traditional college experience than he would get elsewhere.

College recruiting
Name	Hometown	School	Height	Weight	Commit date
Jabari Smith Jr. PF	Fayetteville, GA	Sandy Creek (GA)	6 ft 10 in (2.08 m)	210 lb (95 kg)	Oct 9, 2020
Jabari Smith Jr. PF	Recruit ratings: Rivals: 247Sports: ESPN: (97)				
Overall recruit ranking: Rivals: 7 247Sports: 7 ESPN: 6
Note: In many cases, Scout, Rivals, 247Sports, On3, and ESPN may conflict in their listings of height and weight.; In these cases, the average was taken. ESPN grades are on a 100-point scale.; Sources: "Auburn 2021 Basketball Commitments". Rivals.; "2021 Auburn Tigers Recruiting Class". ESPN.; "2021 Team Ranking". Rivals.

== College career ==
Smith entered his freshman season with high expectations due to his recruiting ranking. Smith emerged as a leader in preseason practice with coach Bruce Pearl describing him as "the hardest working player on the team." He made his college debut against Morehead State in a 77–54 victory for the Tigers. On January 11, 2022, on the road against fierce rival Alabama Smith scored a then career-high 25 points to help the Tigers avoid an upset in an 81–77 victory. On February 16, 2022, Smith recorded a career-high 31 points on just 16 shots in a 94–80 victory over Vanderbilt. As a freshman, he averaged 16.9 points, 7.4 rebounds, and two assists per game while helping lead the Tigers to an SEC regular season championship and the programs first ever #1 ranking in the AP poll. In his NCAA Tournament debut against Jacksonville State, Smith recorded his 6th double-double of the season scoring 20 points and grabbing 14 rebounds. In the second round of the tournament Smith would record another double-double but would also have his worst shooting performance of the season going 3-of-16 from the field as the #2 seeded Tigers were upset by #10 seeded Miami 79–62, ending the Tigers season. At the conclusion of his freshman season, Smith was awarded many honors including being named the USBWA Freshman of the Year, a member of the All-SEC first team and a second-team All American, the Tigers first All American selection since Chris Porter in 1999. On April 5, 2022, Smith declared for the 2022 NBA draft, forgoing his remaining college eligibility. Smith was projected as a top-three selection in the 2022 NBA draft and the potential first pick.

== Professional career ==
=== Houston Rockets (2022–present) ===
==== 2022–23 season: Rookie season ====
Prior to the 2022 NBA draft, Smith was believed by many analysts and insiders to be the number one overall pick, with Smith even saying that he would be surprised not to be picked number one by the Orlando Magic with ESPN's Adrian Wojnarowski on the morning off the draft on Orlando plan's to finalize selecting Smith first overall . However the Magic ended up selecting Paolo Banchero and Smith ending up being selected with third overall pick by the Houston Rockets, making him the highest drafted player to ever come out of Auburn, surpassing Chris Morris and Chuck Person who were drafted 4th overall. The Oklahoma City Thunder promised if he was available Smith would be selected 2nd overall but they instead selected Chet Holmgren.

He made his summer league debut with 10 points, seven rebounds, three assists, and a steal in a 91–77 loss against the Orlando Magic. On October 2, 2022, Smith made his preseason debut, scoring 21 points with 5-of-8 shooting from three along with eight rebounds and two assists in a 134–96 win against the San Antonio Spurs. On October 19, Smith made his regular season debut, scoring 17 points along with seven rebounds and an assist in a 117–107 loss to the Atlanta Hawks. On October 24, Smith recorded his first 20+ point game with free 21 points by shooting 6-to-10 from the field with nine rebounds in a 114–106 victory over the Utah Jazz, the Rockets first victory of the season. On December 2, Smith scored 17 points with six rebounds, one steal, and one blocked shot in a 122–121 victory against the Phoenix Suns. He finished by shooting 7-of-12 from the field, including 3-of-5 from three-point range. The outing was the sixth straight game in which Smith made at least three 3-pointers, the second-longest streak in history by a rookie. On December 23, he recorded his sixth double-double with 24 points by shooting 58.8% from the field and 3-of-8 from three with 10 rebounds in a loss against the Dallas Mavericks.

On January 13, 2023, Smith scored a then career-high 27 points with three blocks and eight rebounds in a game loss against the Sacramento Kings. During a game against the Los Angeles Lakers on January 16, a mic’d up Smith informed LeBron James that “You played against my dad, your first NBA game ever... Sacramento.” On March 9, Smith grabbed 12 rebounds and set a then career-high 30 points in a 134–125 overtime loss to the Indiana Pacers. On March 14, Smith scored 24 points by shooting 83.8 percent from the field with 5 threes made and 11 rebounds in a game win against the Boston Celtics. In doing so, he became the first player in Rockets franchise to average 20-plus points and 10-plus rebounds in three straight games since Hakeem Olajuwon in 1985. On March 17, Smith made a game-winning three-pointer in a 114–112 win over the New Orleans Pelicans. At the conclusion of his rookie season he was voted to the All-Rookie second team.

==== 2023–24 season ====
On December 11, 2023, Smith scored a career high 34 points along with 13 rebounds in a 134–127 loss to the Atlanta Hawks. On March 24, 2024, Smith was suspended one game after being involved in an altercation with Utah Jazz guard Kris Dunn.

==== 2024–25 season ====
On January 3, 2025, Smith suffered a fractured hand during Houston's practice prior to their game against the Boston Celtics. He was subsequently ruled out for four-to-six weeks. Smith made 57 appearances (39 starts) for Houston during the 2024–25 NBA season, averaging 12.2 points, 7.0 rebounds, and 1.1 assists.

==== 2025–26 season ====
On June 30, 2025, Smith and the Rockets agreed to a five-year, $122 million contract extension.

== Player profile ==
Standing at 6 feet and 11 inches (2.11 meters) with a 7'1" feet (2.16 meters) wingspan and weighing 220 pounds (100 kilograms), Smith predominately plays the power forward position. Smith's length makes him a versatile player on both offense and defense. He often utilizes jab-steps to help create space for his jump shot and has range out to the three-point line, shooting 42% from three-point range in college. On defense, he is mobile on the perimeter and physical inside, making him a candidate to defend big men but also switch comfortably onto guards. Smith was noted for his defensive instincts and quick hands, averaging a block and a steal per game in college. Many sources and scouts have compared his play making style to other big men such as Rashard Lewis, Chris Bosh, Michael Porter Jr. and Kevin Durant.

Scouts noted that Smith's main weakness on offense entering the draft is his ball handling, as he oftentimes struggles to generate offense off of the dribble.

== National team career ==
Smith played for the United States at the 2019 FIBA Under-16 Americas Championship in Belém, Brazil. He averaged 13.8 points and 6.2 rebounds per game and helped the United States win the gold medal.

== Career statistics ==
Legend
GP	Games played	GS	Games started	MPG	Minutes per game
FG%	Field goal percentage	3P%	3-point field goal percentage	FT%	Free throw percentage
RPG	Rebounds per game	APG	Assists per game	SPG	Steals per game
BPG	Blocks per game	PPG	Points per game	**Bold**	Career high

=== NBA ===
==== Regular season ====
Year	Team	GP	GS	MPG	FG%	3P%	FT%	RPG	APG	SPG	BPG	PPG
2022–23	Houston	**79**	**79**	31.0	.408	.307	.786	7.2	1.3	.5	**.9**	12.8
2023–24	Houston	76	76	31.9	**.454**	**.363**	.811	**8.1**	1.6	**.7**	.8	13.7
2024–25	Houston	57	39	30.1	.438	.354	**.825**	7.0	1.1	.4	.7	12.2
2025–26	Houston	77	77	**35.1**	.450	**.363**	.775	6.9	**1.9**	**.7**	**.9**	**15.8**
Career		289	271	32.2	.437	.347	.796	7.3	1.5	.6	.9	13.7

==== Playoffs ====
Year	Team	GP	GS	MPG	FG%	3P%	FT%	RPG	APG	SPG	BPG	PPG
2025	Houston	**7**	0	20.4	**.500**	**.455**	**.800**	3.9	.6	.1	**.7**	7.4
2026	Houston	6	**6**	**42.0**	.388	.373	.769	**8.5**	**1.8**	**1.0**	**.7**	**17.5**
Career		13	6	30.4	.420	.397	.778	6.0	1.2	.5	.7	12.1

=== College ===
All statistics per Sports Reference.

Year	Team	GP	GS	MPG	FG%	3P%	FT%	RPG	APG	SPG	BPG	PPG
2021–22	Auburn	34	34	28.8	.429	.420	.799	7.4	2.0	1.1	1.0	16.9

== Personal life ==
Smith's father, Jabari, played in the NBA for four seasons and competed professionally overseas. He has one older brother, named A.J. Smith's distant cousin, Kwame Brown, was the first overall pick in the 2001 NBA draft and played in the NBA for 13 seasons.
