= Ben Sullivan (basketball) =

American basketball coach (born 1984)

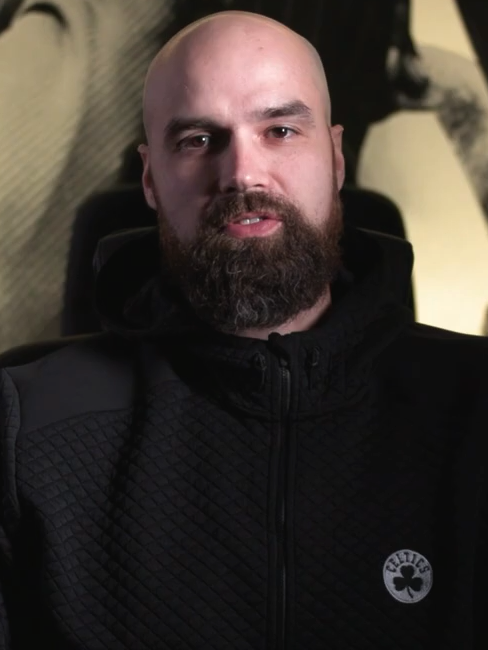
- Sullivan in 2021

Houston Rockets
- Title: Assistant coach
- League: NBA

Personal information
- Born: March 19, 1984 (age 42) Boston, Massachusetts, U.S.
- Listed height: 6 ft 10 in (2.08 m)
- Listed weight: 240 lb (109 kg)

Career information
- High school: Lake Oswego (Lake Oswego, Oregon)
- College: Cal State Northridge (2002–2003); Portland (2004–2007)
- NBA draft: 2007: undrafted
- Playing career: 2007–2009
- Position: Center
- Coaching career: 2009–present

Career history

Playing
- 2007–2008: MLP Academics Heidelberg

Coaching
- 2011–2012: Lewis & Clark (assistant)
- 2014–2018: Atlanta Hawks (assistant)
- 2018–2021: Milwaukee Bucks (assistant)
- 2021–2023: Boston Celtics (assistant)
- 2023–present: Houston Rockets (assistant)

Career highlights
- As assistant coach: NBA champion (2021)

Ben Sullivan (born March 19, 1984) is an American basketball coach and former player who is currently an assistant coach for the Houston Rockets of the National Basketball Association (NBA). He was previously an assistant coach with the Atlanta Hawks and the Milwaukee Bucks of the NBA. A former center at Cal State Northridge and the University of Portland, Sullivan has primarily served as a shooting coach during his NBA coaching career.

== Coaching career ==
Sullivan retired from playing basketball and joined his alma mater Portland as their director of basketball technology before becoming an assistant coach at Lewis & Clark College, during which he was also an office manager at a construction firm in Vancouver, Washington.

=== San Antonio Spurs ===
Sullivan joined the San Antonio Spurs front office in 2012 as a video intern on the recommendation of then-Spurs assistant Ime Udoka. With the Spurs, he worked his way to a position in player development, where he was tasked with everything from scouting reports to analytics, as well as one-on-one workouts with players. He also worked under Spurs assistant Chip Engelland, considered to be one of the top shooting coaches in the NBA.

=== Atlanta Hawks ===
Sullivan was named an assistant coach on former Spurs assistant Mike Budenholzer's coaching staff for the Atlanta Hawks on August 20, 2014.

=== Milwaukee Bucks ===
Sullivan was one of a number of assistants who joined Budenholzer when the latter was hired as head coach of the Milwaukee Bucks before the 2018–19 NBA season. While in Milwaukee, Sullivan has worked with NBA Most Valuable Player Giannis Antetokounmpo in developing his shooting ability, which has been considered as the main weakness in the Bucks star's basketball game. Sullivan won his first NBA championship when the Bucks defeated the Phoenix Suns four games to two in the 2021 NBA Finals.

=== Boston Celtics ===
Before the 2021–22 NBA season, Sullivan was hired as an assistant coach by the Boston Celtics.

=== Houston Rockets ===
On July 3, 2023, Sullivan was hired by the Houston Rockets as an assistant coach.
