= Garrett Jackson =

American basketball player and coach (born 1991)

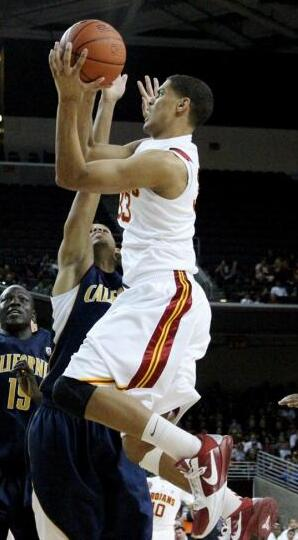
- Jackson with the USC Trojans in 2011

Houston Rockets
- Title: Assistant coach
- League: NBA

Personal information
- Born: October 27, 1991 (age 35) Portland, Oregon, U.S.
- Listed height: 6 ft 7 in (2.01 m)
- Listed weight: 215 lb (98 kg)

Career information
- High school: Westview (Beaverton, Oregon)
- College: USC (2010–2012); Saint Mary's (2013–2015)
- NBA draft: 2015: undrafted
- Playing career: 2015–2018
- Position: Small forward / power forward
- Coaching career: 2021–present

Career history

Playing
- 2015–2016: North-West Tasmania Thunder
- 2015: Melbourne United
- 2016–2017: Sydney Kings
- 2017: Dandenong Rangers
- 2017–2018: TG s.Oliver Wuerzburg

Coaching
- 2021–2023: Boston Celtics (assistant)
- 2023–present: Houston Rockets (assistant)

Career highlights
- All-SEABL Team (2016)

Garrett David-Alex Jackson (born October 27, 1991) is an American professional basketball coach and former player who is an assistant coach for the Houston Rockets of the National Basketball Association (NBA). He played college basketball for USC and Saint Mary's before playing professionally in Australia and Germany.

== High school career ==
Jackson attended Westview High School in the Portland, Oregon area, where he was a two-time Metro League Player of the Year and a two-time first-team selection on The Oregonian Class 6A All-State Team. As a junior in 2008–09, he averaged 19.3 points, 8.7 rebounds, 2.4 assists, 1.8 steals and 1.0 blocks per game.

In November 2009, Jackson signed a National Letter of Intent to play college basketball for the University of Southern California.

As a senior at Westview in 2009–10, Jackson averaged 18.6 points, 8.8 rebounds, 2.3 assists, 1.7 steals and made 52.2 percent of his shots to lead his team to the championship game of the Oregon Class 6A division. He was selected as the Gatorade Oregon Boys Basketball Player of the Year and to the Long Beach Press Telegram's Best in the West second team. He was also a McDonald's All-American nominee for the 2009–10 season.

== College career ==
=== USC ===
As a freshman at USC in 2010–11, Jackson came off the bench in 33 of the Trojans' 34 games and averaged 3.2 points and 1.7 rebounds per game. On November 20, 2010, he scored a season-high 12 points against Bradley.

As a sophomore in 2011–12, Jackson appeared in all 32 games with 14 starts, averaging 6.9 points and 3.1 rebounds in 22.2 minutes per game. He earned the Bill Sharman Award as the team's top free throw shooter, hitting 68.2% of his free throws on the season (30-of-44). His best game as a Trojan came on January 28, 2012, when he scored 16 points against Utah.

=== Saint Mary's ===
In April 2012, Jackson transferred to Saint Mary's and subsequently redshirted the 2012–13 season due to NCAA transfer regulations. At Saint Mary's, he teamed up with childhood friend and high school rival Stephen Holt, as well as future NBA player Matthew Dellavedova.

As a junior playing for the Gaels in 2013–14, Jackson appeared in 24 games and started one, averaging 3.9 points and 3.6 rebounds per game. He missed nine games from December 25 to January 30 with a knee injury. On February 20, he scored a season-high 13 points against San Francisco.

As a senior in 2014–15, Jackson appeared in all 31 games and started 20 during the season, averaging 8.5 points and 4.4 rebounds in 21.9 minutes per game. He registered 12 double-figure scoring games, and was third on the team in field goal percentage, making .521 of his attempts. On February 26, he scored a career-high 26 points against San Francisco, going 10-of-13 from the field and 4-of-5 from three-point range.

=== College statistics ===
Year	Team	GP	GS	MPG	FG%	3P%	FT%	RPG	APG	SPG	BPG	PPG
2010–11	USC	33	0	10.8	.556	.450	.444	1.7	.3	.3	.2	3.2
2011–12	USC	32	14	22.2	.406	.222	.682	3.1	.5	.7	.6	6.9
2013–14	Saint Mary's	24	1	12.1	.376	.278	.704	3.6	.5	.4	.3	3.9
2014–15	Saint Mary's	31	20	21.9	.521	.467	.719	4.4	1.3	.5	.4	8.5
Career		120	35	17.0	.460	.336	.673	3.1	.7	.5	.4	5.7

== Professional career ==
=== NW Tasmania Thunder and Melbourne United (2015–2016) ===
On June 4, 2015, Jackson signed with the North-West Tasmania Thunder for the rest of the 2015 SEABL season. He had just one training session to get to know his teammates and coaching staff before suiting up for the Thunder on June 12 against the Brisbane Spartans. In his debut game, he had 10 points and seven rebounds. He followed that up with a 24-point, 12-rebound performance against the Sandringham Sabres two days later. He was named Player of the Week for Round 10 after recording 30 points and 13 rebounds against the Albury Wodonga Bandits on June 20. He was also named Player of the Week for Round 11 after recording a season-high 37 points and 12 rebounds against the Canberra Gunners on June 27. In 16 games for the Thunder in 2015, he averaged 20.6 points, 9.4 rebounds and 3.3 assists per game.

In September 2015, Jackson began training with Melbourne United of the National Basketball League (NBL). On October 29, 2015, he signed with United as a short-term injury replacement for Hakim Warrick, reuniting him with former Saint Mary's teammate Stephen Holt. He made his NBL debut later that night, scoring three points in just under eight minutes of action, as United defeated the Perth Wildcats 75–73. On November 5, 2015, he had a season-best game with 14 points and five rebounds in just under 18 minutes of action off the bench, helping United defeat the Sydney Kings 105–94 to start the season with an 8–0 record. The next day, he re-signed with the Thunder for the 2016 SEABL season. Jackson's final game for United came on November 20, 2015, as Warrick returned from injury two days later. In six games for United, he averaged 5.2 points and 2.2 rebounds per game.

On April 2, 2016, in the Thunder's season opener, Jackson recorded game highs of 33 points and 14 rebounds in an 83–73 win over the Sandringham Sabres. He subsequently earned SEABL Player of the Week honors for Round 1. On April 16, 2016, he recorded a career-high 40 points and 11 rebounds while playing in all 40 minutes of the Thunder's 101–100 win over the Albury Wodonga Bandits. On May 28, 2016, he had a 39-point, 16-rebound effort in a 94–88 win over the Brisbane Spartans. In 23 games for the Thunder in 2016, he averaged 22.9 points, 8.7 rebounds and 3.0 assists per game. He subsequently earned All-SEABL Team honors.

=== Sydney Kings (2016–2017) ===
On December 22, 2016, Jackson signed with the Sydney Kings for the rest of the 2016–17 NBL season. He trained with the team for a number of sessions as the Kings considered filling their vacant third import slot created by the departure of Steve Blake. Jackson impressed the coaching staff with his athleticism, versatility and, crucially, the ease with which he fit into the existing playing group. He made his debut for the Kings the following day, recording six points and a team-high eight rebounds in 18½ minutes off the bench in an 87–75 loss to the Illawarra Hawks. In six games for the Kings, he averaged 3.8 points and 3.5 rebounds per game.

=== Dandenong Rangers (2017) ===
Jackson joined the Dandenong Rangers midway through the 2017 SEABL season. He made his debut for the Rangers on July 1 against the Bendigo Braves, recording 18 points, seven rebounds, three assists, four steals and one block. He helped the Rangers win the SEABL South Conference title before losing in the SEABL Grand Final to the Mount Gambier Pioneers. In 12 games, he averaged 16.6 points, 7.6 rebounds, 1.6 assists and 1.3 steals per game.

=== s.Oliver Würzburg (2017–2018) ===
On October 28, 2017, Jackson signed with TG s.Oliver Wuerzburg of the German ProB. In 17 games, he averaged 18.7 points, 7.6 rebounds, 2.1 assists and 1.2 steals per game.

== Post-playing career ==
For the 2018–19 season, Jackson joined the Hawaii Rainbow Warriors college basketball staff as a graduate manager. He assisted with video breakdown, scouting, recruiting, practice preparation, and player development.

In April 2019, Jackson was selected for an internship with the San Antonio Spurs' video department. He served in that role until the end of the 2020–21 NBA season.

In September 2021, Jackson was hired as an assistant coach by the Boston Celtics as part of the player enhancement staff.

In June 2023, Jackson joined the Houston Rockets as an assistant coach.

In July 2025, Jackson joined the Australian Boomers coaching staff with responsibilities in training and preparation.
