= Wendell Carter Jr. =

American basketball player (born 1999)

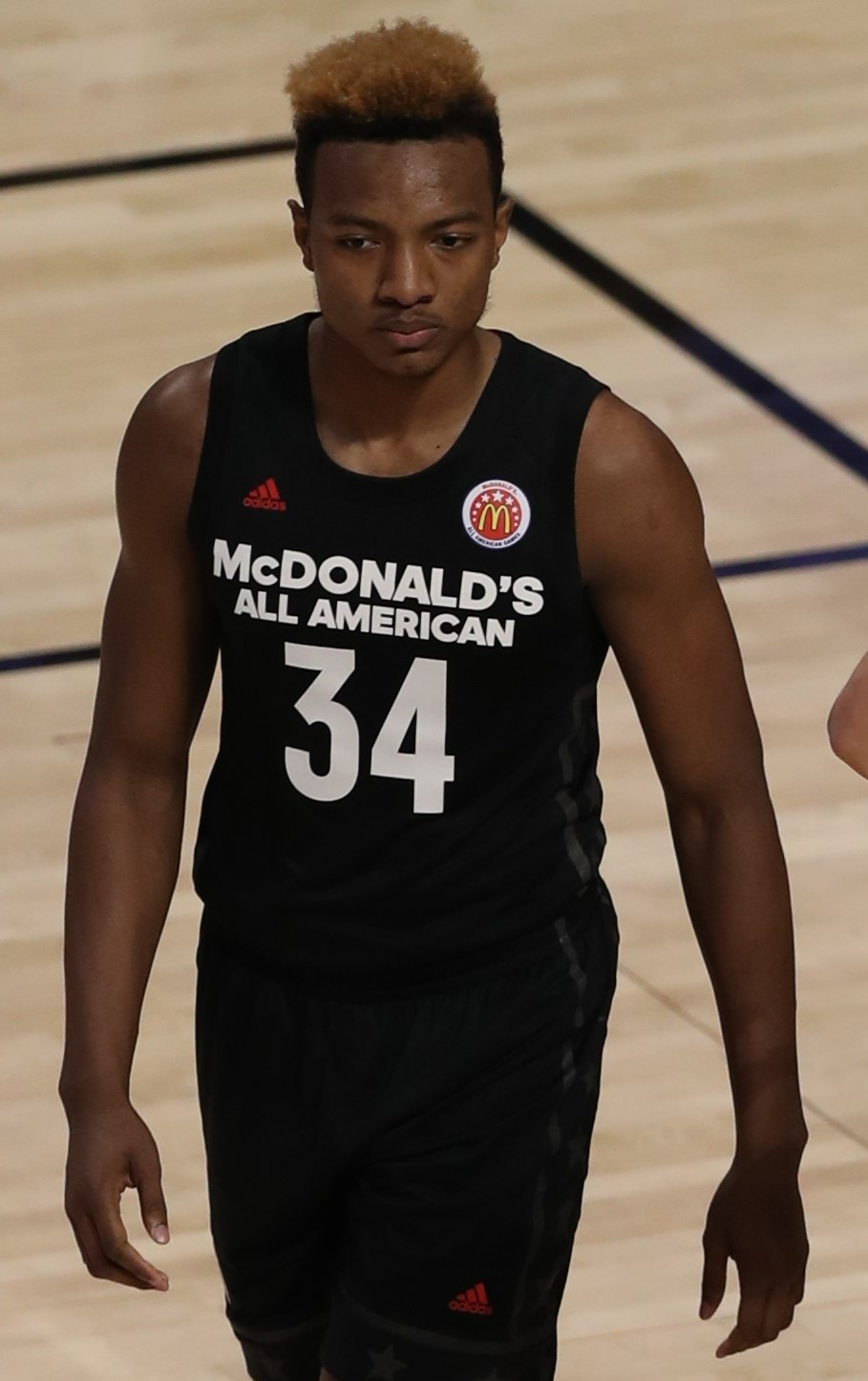
- Carter at the 2017 McDonald's All-American Game

No. 34 – Orlando Magic
- Position: Center / power forward
- League: NBA

Personal information
- Born: April 16, 1999 (age 27) Atlanta, Georgia, U.S.
- Listed height: 6 ft 10 in (2.08 m)
- Listed weight: 262 lb (119 kg)

Career information
- High school: Pace Academy (Atlanta, Georgia)
- College: Duke (2017–2018)
- NBA draft: 2018: 1st round, 7th overall pick
- Drafted by: Chicago Bulls
- Playing career: 2018–present

Career history
- 2018–2021: Chicago Bulls
- 2021–present: Orlando Magic

Career highlights
- Second-team All-ACC (2018); ACC All-Freshman Team (2018); Morgan Wootten National Player of the Year (2017); McDonald's All-American (2017)
- Stats at NBA.com
- Stats at Basketball Reference
Medals
Men's basketball
Representing the United States
FIBA U17 World Cup
Gold medal – first place	2016 Spain	National team

Wendell Andre Carter Jr. (/wɛnˈdɛl/ wen-DEL; born April 16, 1999) is an American professional basketball player for the Orlando Magic of the National Basketball Association (NBA). He played college basketball for the Duke Blue Devils.

== High school career ==
Carter attended Pace Academy in Atlanta, Georgia. As a sophomore, he averaged 21.3 points per game, 12.3 rebounds per game, and 4.1 blocks while leading the Knights to a (27–3) record and a Georgia 6AA regional title. Carter would continue to develop his game during the summer of 2015 where he led his AAU team, Georgia Stars, to a Nike Elite Youth Basketball League (EYBL) Peach Jam championship and was named Co-MVP alongside Jared Harper. after his sophomore season, Carter also earned the Georgia Region 6 AA Player of the Year and second-team Atlanta Tipoff Club All Metro-honors.

In his junior season in 2015–16, he averaged 21.6 points per game and 13.6 rebounds per game. In the state finals game, Carter scored 30 points and recorded 20 rebounds to lead Pace Academy to win the 2016 Georgia class AA state Championship. He was named an honorable mention All-American by the Naismith Trophy, a first-team Junior All-American by MaxPreps, the Georgia Class AA Player of the year, the Atlanta/South Fulton Player of the Year, and a first-team all-state selection as a junior. In the spring and summer of 2016, Carter competed for the AAU team, Team CP3 sponsored by San Antonio Spurs point guard Chris Paul. He averaged 16.8 points per game and 10.2 rebounds per game on the Nike EYBL Circuit, earning second-team All-EYBL honoree.

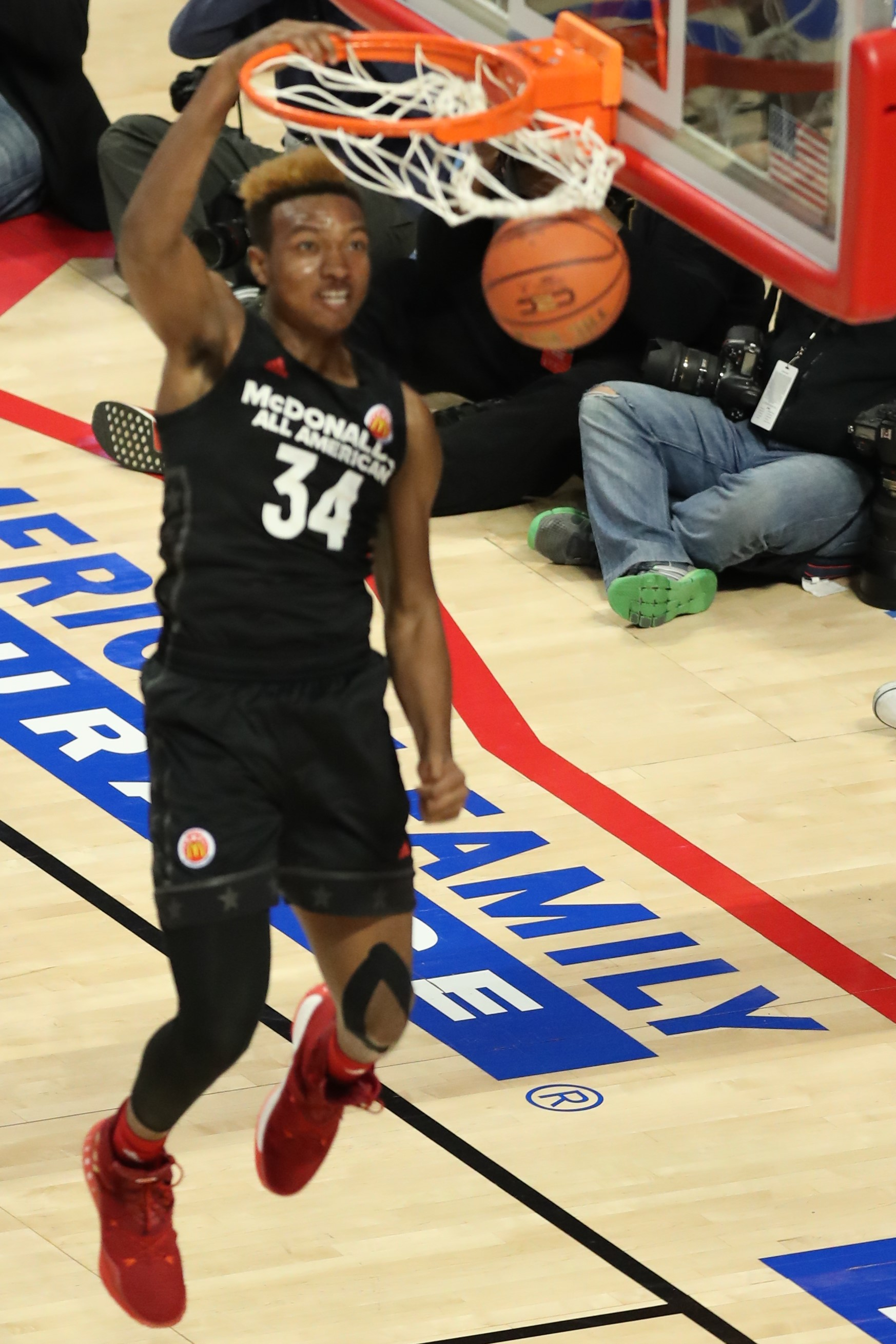
Carter finishing a dunk at the 2017 McDonald's All-American Game

As a senior, he averaged 22.7 points, 15.5 rebounds, and 5.8 blocks while leading the Knights to a Georgia class 3A state championship on March 9, 2017. Carter was named Georgia All-Classification Player of the Year, Gatorade Georgia Player of the Year, first-team All-America honors from the Naismith Trophy, second-team accolades from USA Today, and third-team recognition from MaxPreps. Carter played in the Jordan Brand Classic, Nike Hoop Summit, and the McDonald's All-American Game, where he finished with 10 points, 5 rebounds, and 3 assists.

Off of the court, Carter was named the Morgan Wootten National Player of the Year, which goes to student-athletes who exemplify outstanding character, leadership, and academics. He earned a 3.8 GPA in high school and won his school's Lance and Shield Award as a top scholar-athlete.

Carter was rated as a five-star recruit and the No. 4 overall recruit and No. 1 power forward in the 2017 high school class. Following high school, he was named to the All-Tournament Team of the 2016 FIBA Under-17 World Championship in July 2017. Carter ultimately chose to play at Duke University despite considering the opportunity to enroll and play at Harvard.

== College career ==
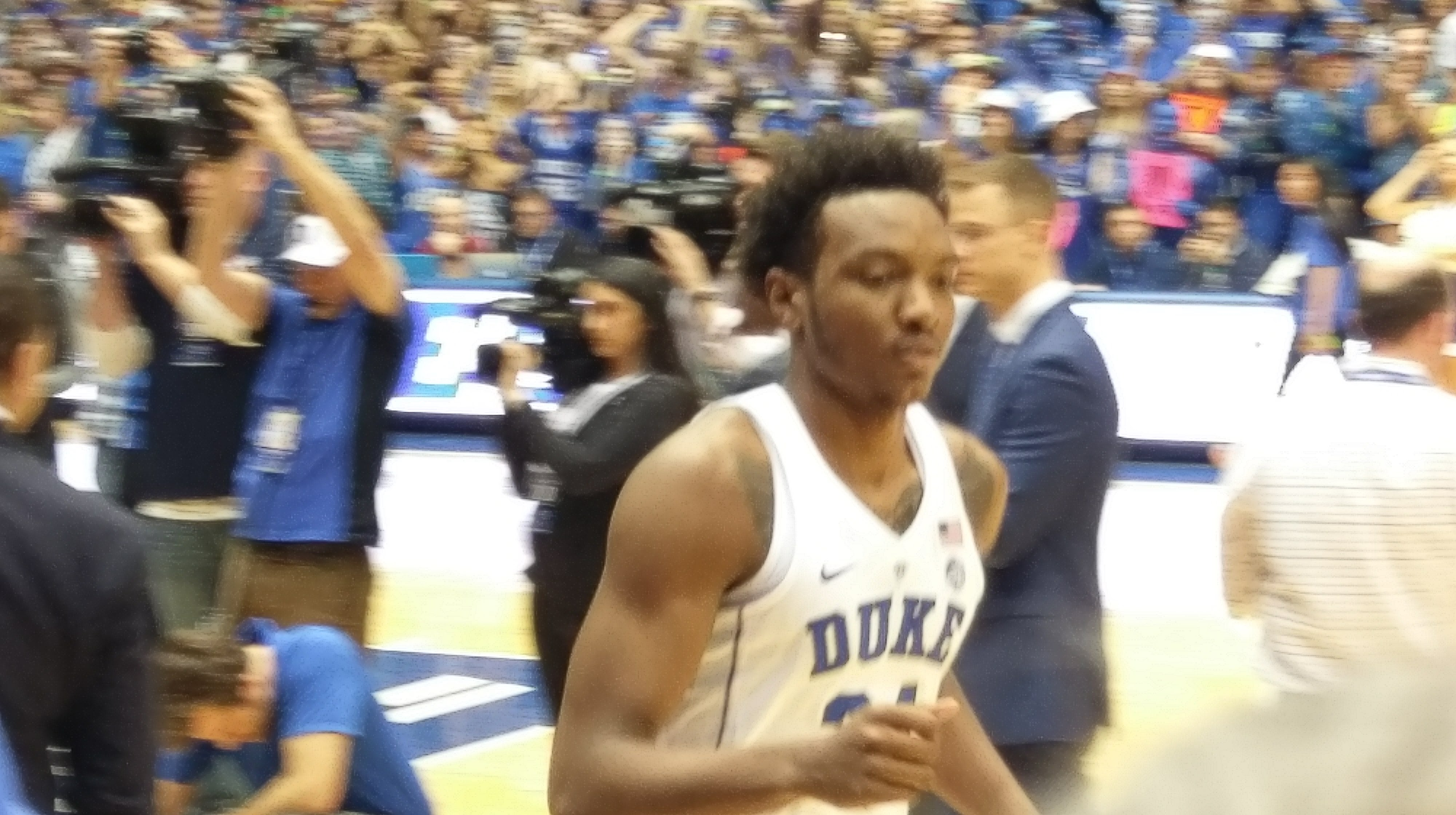
Carter with Duke in 2018

Before the start of his freshman season, Carter was projected to start at power forward for the 2017-18 Blue Devils forming a frontcourt tandem with Marvin Bagley III. Carter was also named to Naismith, Robertson, and Malone preseason watch lists. On November 18, Carter scored 20 points and 11 rebounds in a 78–61 victory over Southern. On November 20, Carter was named ACC rookie of the week. Against the Indiana Hoosiers, he had a double-double with 18 points and 12 rebounds despite being in foul trouble to lift Duke in a 91–81 win. On December 20, 2017, Carter scored a career-high 27 points in a 104–40 blowout win against Evansville. On December 26, 2017, Carter earned his second ACC rookie of the week honor. On January 20, 2018, Carter tallied 21 points in an 81–54 victory against Pittsburgh. On January 24, 2018, Carter scored 23 points and 12 rebounds in an 84–70 win over Wake Forest. On January 29, 2018, Carter added 17 points and 7 rebounds in an 88–66 victory over Notre Dame. On February 11, 2018, Carter scored 19 points and 10 rebounds in an 80–69 victory over Georgia Tech. On February 18, 2018, Carter provided 15 points and 10 rebounds in a 66–57 win against Clemson. On February 21, 2018, Carter scored 18 points and 6 assist in an 82–56 win over Louisville. On February 24, 2018, Carter scored 16 points and 10 rebounds in a 60–44 win against Syracuse. On the season, Carter averaged 13.1 points and 9.1 rebounds per game. Carter had one of the best freshman seasons for a power forward/center in Duke history where he would finish second all-time for Duke freshman with (335) rebounds, (76) blocked shots and (16) career double-doubles.

Following Duke's loss in the 2018 NCAA men's basketball tournament, Carter announced his intention to forgo his final three seasons of collegiate eligibility and declare for the 2018 NBA draft. Carter was subsequently named both Second team All-ACC and ACC All-Freshman teams.

== Professional career ==
=== Chicago Bulls (2018–2021) ===
On June 21, 2018, Carter was selected with the seventh overall pick by the Chicago Bulls. On July 3, 2018, Carter officially signed with the Bulls. On October 18, he made his NBA debut, scoring eight points and recording three rebounds, three assists and a block against the Philadelphia 76ers, Four days later, Carter recorded career-highs in rebounds (9) and assists (4) against the Dallas Mavericks. On October 31, 2018, Carter scored a season high 25 points with eight rebounds, five assists, three blocks and three steals in a 107–108 overtime loss to the Denver Nuggets. He would break that amount on November 30 with 28 points scored in a loss to the Detroit Pistons. On March 24, 2019, Carter was ruled out for the remainder of the season with left thumb surgery.

=== Orlando Magic (2021–present) ===
On March 25, 2021, Carter and Otto Porter were traded to the Orlando Magic in exchange for Nikola Vučević and Al-Farouq Aminu. Orlando also received two future first-round draft picks.

On October 16, 2021, Carter signed a four-year, $50 million rookie scale extension with the Magic. On March 20, 2022, Carter scored a career-high 30 points in a 90–85 win against the Oklahoma City Thunder.

Carter matched his career-high of 30 points in a 116–108 loss on November 1, 2022, against the Oklahoma City Thunder. On December 11, Carter scored a double-double of 20 points and 10 rebounds in a 114–97 win against the Phoenix Suns. On December 18, Carter scored 21 points and 8 rebounds in a 108–107 victory over the Chicago Bulls. On December 29, he was suspended by the NBA for one game without pay due to coming off the bench during an altercation in a game against the Detroit Pistons the day before.

On October 7, 2024, Carter and the Magic agreed to a three–year, $58.7 million contract extension.

== National team career ==
Carter played with the United States U17 team at the FIBA Under-17 Basketball World Cup, where he won gold. As well, he was named to the All-Tournament Team, along with teammate Collin Sexton.

== Career statistics ==
Legend
GP	Games played	GS	Games started	MPG	Minutes per game
FG%	Field goal percentage	3P%	3-point field goal percentage	FT%	Free throw percentage
RPG	Rebounds per game	APG	Assists per game	SPG	Steals per game
BPG	Blocks per game	PPG	Points per game	**Bold**	Career high

=== NBA ===
==== Regular season ====
Year	Team	GP	GS	MPG	FG%	3P%	FT%	RPG	APG	SPG	BPG	PPG
2018–19	Chicago	44	44	25.2	.485	.188	**.795**	7.0	1.8	.6	**1.3**	10.3
2019–20	Chicago	43	43	29.2	**.534**	.207	.737	9.4	1.2	**.8**	.8	11.3
2020–21	Chicago	32	25	24.7	.512	.364	.739	7.8	2.2	.6	.8	10.9
2020–21	Orlando	22	19	26.5	.493	.241	.721	8.8	1.6	**.8**	.8	11.7
2021–22	Orlando	62	61	**29.9**	.525	.327	.691	**10.5**	**2.8**	.6	.7	15.0
2022–23	Orlando	57	54	29.6	.525	.356	.738	8.7	2.3	.5	.6	**15.2**
2023–24	Orlando	55	48	25.6	.525	**.374**	.694	6.9	1.7	.6	.5	11.0
2024–25	Orlando	68	51	25.9	.460	.234	.737	7.2	2.0	**.8**	.6	9.1
2025–26	Orlando	**78**	**78**	29.3	.512	.319	.792	7.4	2.0	**.8**	.6	11.8
Career		461	423	27.6	.510	.316	.740	8.1	2.0	.7	.7	11.9

==== Playoffs ====
Year	Team	GP	GS	MPG	FG%	3P%	FT%	RPG	APG	SPG	BPG	PPG
2024	Orlando	**7**	5	26.4	.404	**.280**	**.727**	6.3	1.3	**.7**	.6	7.6
2025	Orlando	5	5	32.4	**.525**	.273	.600	**10.8**	1.2	.4	.4	10.2
2026	Orlando	**7**	**7**	**33.9**	.521	.278	.710	7.0	**2.9**	.6	**1.7**	**11.0**
Career		19	19	30.7	.481	.278	.692	7.7	1.8	.6	.9	9.5

=== College ===
Year	Team	GP	GS	MPG	FG%	3P%	FT%	RPG	APG	SPG	BPG	PPG
2017–18	Duke	37	37	26.8	.561	.413	.738	9.1	2.0	.8	2.1	13.5

== Personal life ==
Wendell's father, Wendell Sr., played professional basketball in the Dominican Republic after playing college basketball at Delta State University. His mother, Kylia Carter, played basketball at the University of Mississippi.

On February 23, 2018, Carter was 1 of 25 college players identified in an FBI investigation as having received impermissible benefits as a college athlete as a result of his mother allegedly having had her lunch paid for by an agent nine months before he signed to play for Duke.

Carter is currently in a relationship with WNBA player Angel Reese, after first being spotted together in May 2025, which Carter confirmed later that year.
