= 2023–24 Atlanta Hawks season =

- Head coach: Quin Snyder
- General manager: Landry Fields
- Owner: Tony Ressler
- Arena: State Farm Arena

Results
- Record: 36–46 (.439)
- Place: Division: 3rd (Southeast); Conference: 10th (Eastern)
- Playoff finish: Did not qualify
- Stats at Basketball Reference

Local media
- Television: Bally Sports South; Bally Sports Southeast; WPCH-TV & Peachtree Sports Network (for 10 games)
- Radio: 92.9 FM "The Game"

The 2023–24 Atlanta Hawks season was the 75th season of the franchise in the National Basketball Association (NBA) and 56th in Atlanta. It is the first full season under new head coach Quin Snyder.

The Hawks made it to their fourth straight postseason appearance and third straight play-in berth, as the No. 10 seed. Their season ended with a loss in the East 9/10 game to the Chicago Bulls, 131–116. They became the first team to qualify for postseason and win the NBA Draft Lottery without a trade, as NBA rules state that the four teams eliminated in the first stage of postseason (play-in) participate in the Draft Lottery.

The Atlanta Hawks drew an average home attendance of 16,985 in 41 home games in the 2023-24 NBA season.

== Draft ==
Round	Pick	Player	Position	Nationality	School/Club team
1	15	Kobe Bufkin	SG	United States	Michigan (So.)
2	46	Seth Lundy	SF	United States	Penn State (Sr.)

The Hawks entered the draft holding one first round pick and one second round pick, which was conveyed from the New Orleans Pelicans when it fell outside the Top 45. Their original second-round pick was conveyed to the Portland Trail Blazers as the second most favorable selection when the Hawks finished the previous season between the Charlotte Hornets and the Brooklyn Nets.

== Roster ==
2023–24 Atlanta Hawks roster
Players

Pos.	No.	Player	Height	Weight	DOB	From
F	41	Saddiq Bey	6 ft 7 in (2.01 m)	215 lb (98 kg)	1999-04-09	Villanova
G	13	Bogdan Bogdanović	6 ft 5 in (1.96 m)	225 lb (102 kg)	1992-08-18	Serbia
G	4	Kobe Bufkin	6 ft 5 in (1.96 m)	195 lb (88 kg)	2003-09-21	Michigan
C	15	Clint Capela	6 ft 10 in (2.08 m)	256 lb (116 kg)	1994-05-18	Switzerland
F/C	24	Bruno Fernando	6 ft 9 in (2.06 m)	240 lb (109 kg)	1998-08-15	Maryland
G	2	Trent Forrest	6 ft 4 in (1.93 m)	210 lb (95 kg)	1998-06-12	Florida State
F	14	AJ Griffin	6 ft 6 in (1.98 m)	222 lb (101 kg)	2003-08-25	Duke
F	18	Mouhamed Gueye	6 ft 10 in (2.08 m)	210 lb (95 kg)	2002-11-09	Washington State
G/F	12	De'Andre Hunter	6 ft 8 in (2.03 m)	221 lb (100 kg)	1997-12-02	Virginia
F	1	Jalen Johnson	6 ft 8 in (2.03 m)	219 lb (99 kg)	2001-12-18	Duke
G	27	Vít Krejčí (TW)	6 ft 8 in (2.03 m)	195 lb (88 kg)	2000-06-19	Czech Republic
F	3	Seth Lundy (TW)	6 ft 4 in (1.93 m)	220 lb (100 kg)	2000-04-02	Penn State
G	25	Garrison Mathews	6 ft 6 in (1.98 m)	215 lb (98 kg)	1996-10-24	Lipscomb
G/F	32	Wesley Matthews	6 ft 5 in (1.96 m)	220 lb (100 kg)	1986-10-14	Marquette
G	5	Dejounte Murray	6 ft 5 in (1.96 m)	180 lb (82 kg)	1996-09-19	Washington
F/C	17	Onyeka Okongwu	6 ft 10 in (2.08 m)	240 lb (109 kg)	2000-12-11	USC
G/F	20	Dylan Windler (TW)	6 ft 6 in (1.98 m)	196 lb (89 kg)	1996-09-22	Belmont
G	11	Trae Young	6 ft 1 in (1.85 m)	164 lb (74 kg)	1998-09-19	Oklahoma

Coaches
Head coach
- Quin Snyder
Assistant(s)
- Bryan Bailey
- Mike Brey
- Brittni Donaldson
- Steve Klei
- Igor Kokoškov
- Antonio Lang
- Sanjay Lumpkin
- Ronald Nored
- Ryan Schmidt
- Ekpe Udoh
- Jett Watkinson

Legend
- (DP) Unsigned draft pick
- (FA) Free agent
- (S) Suspended
- (GL) On assignment to G League affiliate
- (TW) Two-way affiliate player
- Injured

Roster
Updated: March 16, 2024

== Standings ==
=== Division ===
Southeast Division	W	L	PCT	GB	Home	Road	Div	GP
y – Orlando Magic	47	35	.573	–	29‍–‍12	18‍–‍23	9‍–‍7	82
x – Miami Heat	46	36	.561	1.0	22‍–‍19	24‍–‍17	13‍–‍3	82
pi – Atlanta Hawks	36	46	.439	11.0	21‍–‍20	15‍–‍26	8‍–‍8	82
Charlotte Hornets	21	61	.256	26.0	11‍–‍30	10‍–‍31	6‍–‍10	82
Washington Wizards	15	67	.183	32.0	7‍–‍34	8‍–‍33	4‍–‍12	82

=== Conference ===
Eastern Conference
#	Team	W	L	PCT	GB	GP
1	z – Boston Celtics *	64	18	.780	–	82
2	x – New York Knicks	50	32	.610	14.0	82
3	y – Milwaukee Bucks *	49	33	.598	15.0	82
4	x – Cleveland Cavaliers	48	34	.585	16.0	82
5	y – Orlando Magic *	47	35	.573	17.0	82
6	x – Indiana Pacers	47	35	.573	17.0	82
7	x – Philadelphia 76ers	47	35	.573	17.0	82
8	x – Miami Heat	46	36	.561	18.0	82
9	pi – Chicago Bulls	39	43	.476	25.0	82
10	pi – Atlanta Hawks	36	46	.439	28.0	82
11	Brooklyn Nets	32	50	.390	32.0	82
12	Toronto Raptors	25	57	.305	39.0	82
13	Charlotte Hornets	21	61	.256	43.0	82
14	Washington Wizards	15	67	.183	49.0	82
15	Detroit Pistons	14	68	.171	50.0	82

== Game log ==
=== Preseason ===
2023 preseason game log
Total: 3–2 (Home: 3–0; Road: 0–2)
Preseason: 3–2 (home: 3–0; road: 0–2)

Game	Date	Team	Score	High points	High rebounds	High assists	Location Attendance	Record
1	October 10	Cleveland	W 108–107	Trent Forrest (13)	Clint Capela (10)	Trae Young (5)	State Farm Arena; 11,659	1–0
2	October 12	Memphis	W 103–102	Trae Young (20)	Bufkin, Fernando, Gueye (6)	Bruno Fernando (4)	State Farm Arena; 12,437	2–0
3	October 14	New Orleans	W 110–105	Onyeka Okongwu (18)	Bogdanović, Murray (7)	Jalen Johnson (7)	Gateway Center Arena; 3,051	3–0
4	October 16	@ Indiana	L 112–116	Saddiq Bey (21)	Saddiq Bey (10)	Trent Forrest (4)	Gainbridge Fieldhouse; 8,976	3–1
5	October 20	@ Philadelphia	L 106–120	Trae Young (19)	De'Andre Hunter (8)	Trae Young (10)	Wells Fargo Center	3–2

2023–24 preseason schedule

=== Regular season ===
2023–24 game log
Total: 36–46 (Home: 21–20; Road: 15–26)
October: 2–2 (home: 1–1; road: 1–1)

Game	Date	Team	Score	High points	High rebounds	High assists	Location Attendance	Record
1	October 25	@ Charlotte	L 110–116	Trae Young (23)	Clint Capela (13)	Trae Young (9)	Spectrum Center; 16,128	0–1
2	October 27	New York	L 120–126	De'Andre Hunter (27)	Clint Capela (13)	Trae Young (12)	State Farm Arena; 17,692	0–2
3	October 29	@ Milwaukee	W 127–110	Trae Young (20)	Clint Capela (12)	Trae Young (11)	Fiserv Forum; 17,341	1–2
4	October 30	Minnesota	W 127–113	Dejounte Murray (41)	Murray, Okongwu (7)	Trae Young (8)	State Farm Arena; 15,504	2–2

November: 7–7 (home: 2–4; road: 5–3)

Game	Date	Team	Score	High points	High rebounds	High assists	Location Attendance	Record
5	November 1	Washington	W 130–121	Dejounte Murray (24)	Capela, Johnson, Okongwu (11)	Trae Young (10)	State Farm Arena; 15,925	3–2
6	November 4	@ New Orleans	W 123–105	Trae Young (22)	Jalen Johnson (11)	Trae Young (12)	Smoothie King Center; 17,237	4–2
7	November 6	@ Oklahoma City	L 117–126	Dejounte Murray (29)	Onyeka Okongwu (14)	Trae Young (11)	Paycom Center; 16,486	4–3
8	November 9	@ Orlando	W 120–119	Trae Young (41)	Clint Capela (11)	Trae Young (8)	Mexico City Arena; 19,986	5–3
9	November 11	Miami	L 109–117	Trae Young (27)	Clint Capela (12)	Trae Young (11)	State Farm Arena; 17,722	5–4
10	November 14	@ Detroit	W 126–120	Dejounte Murray (32)	Onyeka Okongwu (9)	Dejounte Murray (9)	Little Caesars Arena; 16,963	6–4
11	November 15	New York	L 114–116	Bogdan Bogdanović (28)	Onyeka Okongwu (6)	Trae Young (17)	State Farm Arena; 17,060	6–5
12	November 17	Philadelphia	L 116–126	Trae Young (22)	Clint Capela (11)	Trae Young (13)	State Farm Arena; 17,067	6–6
13	November 21	Indiana	L 152–157	Trae Young (38)	Saddiq Bey (10)	Trae Young (8)	State Farm Arena; 17,162	6–7
14	November 22	Brooklyn	W 147–145 (OT)	Trae Young (43)	Clint Capela (15)	Trae Young (9)	State Farm Arena; 17,340	7–7
15	November 25	@ Washington	W 136–108	Trae Young (26)	Clint Capela (11)	Murray, Young (10)	Capital One Arena; 16,276	8–7
16	November 26	@ Boston	L 103–113	Trae Young (33)	Bey, Capela (8)	Trae Young (7)	TD Garden; 19,156	8–8
17	November 28	@ Cleveland	L 105–128	Bogdanović, Hunter (18)	Capela, Okongwu (9)	Trae Young (10)	Rocket Mortgage FieldHouse; 19,432	8–9
18	November 30	@ San Antonio	W 137–135	Trae Young (45)	Clint Capela (9)	Trae Young (14)	Frost Bank Center; 17,646	9–9

December: 4–10 (home: 1–4; road: 3–6)

Game	Date	Team	Score	High points	High rebounds	High assists	Location Attendance	Record
19	December 2	@ Milwaukee	L 121–132	Trae Young (32)	Clint Capela (17)	Trae Young (12)	Fiserv Forum; 17,866	9–10
20	December 6	Brooklyn	L 113–114	Trae Young (30)	Clint Capela (12)	Murray, Young (9)	State Farm Arena; 15,906	9–11
21	December 8	@ Philadelphia	L 114–125	De'Andre Hunter (24)	Clint Capela (16)	Dejounte Murray (9)	Wells Fargo Center; 19,746	9–12
22	December 11	Denver	L 122–129	Bogdan Bogdanović (40)	Clint Capela (8)	Trae Young (9)	State Farm Arena; 17,531	9–13
23	December 13	@ Toronto	L 128–135	Trae Young (35)	Bey, Capela (10)	Trae Young (17)	Scotiabank Arena; 19,423	9–14
24	December 15	@ Toronto	W 125–104	Trae Young (38)	Clint Capela (15)	Trae Young (11)	Scotiabank Arena; 19,800	10–14
25	December 16	@ Cleveland	L 119–127	Trae Young (35)	Bruno Fernando (8)	Trae Young (10)	Rocket Mortgage FieldHouse; 19,432	10–15
26	December 18	Detroit	W 130–124	Trae Young (31)	Clint Capela (15)	Trae Young (15)	State Farm Arena; 17,664	11–15
27	December 20	@ Houston	W 134–127	Trae Young (30)	Onyeka Okongwu (11)	Trae Young (14)	Toyota Center; 18,055	12–15
28	December 22	@ Miami	L 113–122	Trae Young (30)	Bey, Capela (10)	Trae Young (13)	Kaseya Center; 20,029	12–16
29	December 23	Memphis	L 119–125	Trae Young (30)	Clint Capela (12)	Trae Young (13)	State Farm Arena; 17,632	12–17
30	December 26	@ Chicago	L 113–118	Bogdan Bogdanović (22)	Jalen Johnson (9)	Trae Young (13)	United Center; 21,420	12–18
31	December 29	Sacramento	L 110–117	Trae Young (24)	Jalen Johnson (15)	Trae Young (9)	State Farm Arena; 18,305	12–19
32	December 31	@ Washington	W 130–126	Trae Young (40)	Clint Capela (17)	Trae Young (13)	Capital One Arena; 17,042	13–19

January : 7–8 (home: 6–4; road: 1–4)

Game	Date	Team	Score	High points	High rebounds	High assists	Location Attendance	Record
33	January 3	Oklahoma City	W 141–138	Jalen Johnson (28)	Clint Capela (14)	Trae Young (11)	State Farm Arena; 17,770	14–19
34	January 5	@ Indiana	L 116–150	Dejounte Murray (30)	Jalen Johnson (8)	Trae Young (6)	Gainbridge Fieldhouse; 17,274	14–20
35	January 7	@ Orlando	L 110–117 (OT)	Trae Young (31)	Clint Capela (12)	Trae Young (9)	Kia Center; 19,349	14–21
36	January 10	Philadelphia	W 139–132 (OT)	Trae Young (28)	Jalen Johnson (16)	Trae Young (11)	State Farm Arena; 16,089	15–21
37	January 12	Indiana	L 108–126	Dejounte Murray (29)	Bogdanović, Capela (5)	Forrest, Young (6)	State Farm Arena; 15,596	15–22
38	January 13	Washington	L 99–127	Trae Young (21)	Onyeka Okongwu (10)	Trae Young (10)	State Farm Arena; 17,108	15–23
39	January 15	San Antonio	W 109–99	Trae Young (36)	Dejounte Murray (13)	Trae Young (13)	State Farm Arena; 17,447	16–23
40	January 17	Orlando	W 106–104	Dejounte Murray (26)	Johnson, Okongwu (9)	Trae Young (12)	State Farm Arena; 14,541	17–23
41	January 19	@ Miami	W 109–108	Dejounte Murray (22)	Clint Capela (11)	Dejounte Murray (11)	Kaseya Center; 20,040	18–23
42	January 20	Cleveland	L 95–116	Dejounte Murray (24)	Capela, Murray (9)	Murray, Young (5)	State Farm Arena; 17,047	18–24
43	January 22	@ Sacramento	L 107–122	Dejounte Murray (35)	Clint Capela (12)	Dejounte Murray (6)	Golden 1 Center; 17,832	18–25
44	January 24	@ Golden State	L 112–134	Dejounte Murray (23)	Clint Capela (11)	Dejounte Murray (7)	Chase Center; 18,064	18–26
45	January 26	Dallas	L 143–148	Trae Young (30)	Clint Capela (8)	Trae Young (11)	State Farm Arena; 16,149	18–27
46	January 28	Toronto	W 126–125	Trae Young (30)	Clint Capela (14)	Trae Young (12)	State Farm Arena; 15,658	19–27
47	January 30	L.A. Lakers	W 138–122	Trae Young (26)	Clint Capela (12)	Trae Young (13)	State Farm Arena; 17,871	20–27

February: 6–6 (home: 5–3; road: 1–3)

Game	Date	Team	Score	High points	High rebounds	High assists	Location Attendance	Record
48	February 2	Phoenix	W 129–120	Trae Young (32)	Clint Capela (10)	Trae Young (15)	State Farm Arena; 16,536	21–27
49	February 3	Golden State	W 141–134 (OT)	Trae Young (35)	Onyeka Okongwu (16)	Jalen Johnson (8)	State Farm Arena; 17,600	22–27
50	February 5	L.A. Clippers	L 144–149	De'Andre Hunter (27)	Hunter, Johnson (7)	Trae Young (12)	State Farm Arena; 17,093	22–28
51	February 7	@ Boston	L 117–125	Saddiq Bey (25)	Jalen Johnson (15)	Trae Young (10)	TD Garden; 19,156	22–29
52	February 9	@ Philadelphia	W 127–121	Trae Young (37)	Bey, Johnson (11)	Trae Young (12)	Wells Fargo Center; 19,758	23–29
53	February 10	Houston	W 122–113	Dejounte Murray (34)	Bogdanović, Okongwu (7)	Trae Young (8)	State Farm Arena; 17,503	24–29
54	February 12	Chicago	L 126–136	Bogdan Bogdanović (28)	Onyeka Okongwu (12)	Trae Young (14)	State Farm Arena; 16,524	24–30
55	February 14	@ Charlotte	L 99–122	De'Andre Hunter (21)	Fernando, Johnson (12)	Trae Young (12)	Spectrum Center; 14,336	24–31
All-Star Game
56	February 23	Toronto	L 121–123	Dejounte Murray (24)	Jalen Johnson (12)	Murray, Young (7)	State Farm Arena; 17,625	24–32
57	February 25	Orlando	W 109–92	Dejounte Murray (25)	Jalen Johnson (10)	Dejounte Murray (11)	State Farm Arena; 17,173	25–32
58	February 27	Utah	W 124–97	Jalen Johnson (22)	Capela, Johnson (13)	Dejounte Murray (11)	State Farm Arena; 17,129	26–32
59	February 29	@ Brooklyn	L 97–124	Dejounte Murray (28)	Capela, Murray (6)	Dejounte Murray (5)	Barclays Center; 17,284	26–33

March : 8–7 (home: 5–2; road: 3–5)

Game	Date	Team	Score	High points	High rebounds	High assists	Location Attendance	Record
60	March 2	@ Brooklyn	L 102–114	Saddiq Bey (23)	Clint Capela (10)	Dejounte Murray (11)	Barclays Center; 18,075	26–34
61	March 5	@ New York	W 116–100	Jalen Johnson (26)	four players (9)	Jalen Johnson (7)	Madison Square Garden; 19,812	27–34
62	March 6	Cleveland	W 112–101	Bogdanović, Bey (23)	Bruno Fernando (10)	Dejounte Murray (9)	State Farm Arena; 15,841	28–34
63	March 8	@ Memphis	W 99–92	Dejounte Murray (41)	Clint Capela (11)	Dejounte Murray (6)	FedExForum; 16,667	29–34
64	March 10	New Orleans	L 103–116	Bogdan Bogdanović (25)	Clint Capela (14)	Dejounte Murray (11)	State Farm Arena; 17,695	29–35
65	March 13	@ Portland	L 102–106	Dejounte Murray (40)	Clint Capela (14)	Bogdan Bogdanović (8)	Moda Center; 18,064	29–36
66	March 15	@ Utah	L 122–124	Dejounte Murray (33)	Clint Capela (15)	Dejounte Murray (9)	Delta Center	29–37
67	March 17	@ L.A. Clippers	W 110–93	Dejounte Murray (21)	Clinta Capela (13)	Dejounte Murray (10)	Crypto.com Arena; 19,370	30–37
68	March 18	@ L.A. Lakers	L 105–136	Jalen Johnson (25)	Capela, Johnson (9)	Dejounte Murray (10)	Crypto.com Arena; 18,997	30–38
69	March 21	@ Phoenix	L 115–128	Dejounte Murray (29)	Clint Capela (10)	Dejounte Murray (10)	Footprint Center; 17,071	30–39
70	March 23	Charlotte	W 132–91	Dejounte Murray (28)	Clint Capela (10)	Dejounte Murray (12)	State Farm Arena; 17,900	31–39
71	March 25	Boston	W 120–118	De'Andre Hunter (24)	Clint Capela (12)	Dejounte Murray (15)	State Farm Arena; 17,405	32–39
72	March 27	Portland	W 120–106	Dejounte Murray (30)	Clint Capela (10)	Dejounte Murray (7)	State Farm Arena; 16,059	33–39
73	March 28	Boston	W 123–122 (OT)	Dejounte Murray (44)	Capela, Hunter (13)	Dejounte Murray (7)	State Farm Arena; 17,743	34–39
74	March 30	Milwaukee	L 113–122	Bogdan Bogdanović (38)	Bogdan Bogdanvoić (10)	Dejounte Murray (12)	State Farm Arena; 17,700	34–40

April: 2–6 (home: 1–2; road: 1–4)

Game	Date	Team	Score	High points	High rebounds	High assists	Location Attendance	Record
75	April 1	@ Chicago	W 113–101	Bogdan Bogdanović (20)	Clint Capela (11)	Bogdanović, Murray (6)	United Center; 21,114	35–40
76	April 3	Detroit	W 121–113	Jalen Johnson (28)	Clint Capela (16)	Johnson, Murray (11)	State Farm Arena; 17,899	36–40
77	April 4	@ Dallas	L 95–109	Bogdan Bogdanović (17)	Jalen Johnson (16)	Johnson, Murray (6)	American Airlines Center; 20,211	36–41
78	April 6	@ Denver	L 110–142	Clint Capela (19)	Clint Capela (12)	Dejounte Murray (12)	Ball Arena; 19,639	36–42
79	April 9	Miami	L 111–117 (2OT)	Dejounte Murray (29)	Dejounte Murray (13)	Dejounte Murray (13)	State Farm Arena; 17,049	36–43
80	April 10	Charlotte	L 114–115	Bogdanović, Krejčí (19)	Mouhamed Gueye (7)	Trae Young (11)	State Farm Arena; 16,158	36–44
81	April 12	@ Minnesota	L 106–109	Trae Young (19)	Clint Capela (11)	Trae Young (7)	Target Center; 18,024	36–45
82	April 14	@ Indiana	L 115–157	Dejounte Murray (32)	Mouhamed Gueye (9)	Trae Young (12)	Gainbridge Fieldhouse; 17,274	36–46

2023–24 season schedule

=== Play-in ===
The Hawks qualified into the play-in tournament.

2024 play-in game log
Total: 0–1 (Home: 0–0; Road: 0–1)
Play-in: 0–1 (home: 0–0; road: 0–1)

Game	Date	Team	Score	High points	High rebounds	High assists	Location Attendance	Record
1	April 17	@ Chicago	L 116–131	Dejounte Murray (30)	Clint Capela (17)	Trae Young (10)	United Center; 21,627	0–1

2023–24 season schedule

=== In-Season Tournament ===
This was the first regular season where all the NBA teams competed in a mid-season tournament setting due to the implementation of the 2023 NBA In-Season Tournament. During the in-season tournament period, the Hawks competed in Group A of the Eastern Conference, which included the Philadelphia 76ers, Cleveland Cavaliers, Indiana Pacers, and Detroit Pistons.

==== East group A ====
Pos	Team	Pld	W	L	PF	PA	PD	Qualification	IND	CLE	PHI	ATL	DET
1	Indiana Pacers	4	4	0	546	507	+39	Advance to knockout stage	—	121–116	132–126	157–152	136–113
2	Cleveland Cavaliers	4	3	1	474	445	+29		116–121	—	122–119 (OT)	128–105	108–100
3	Philadelphia 76ers	4	2	2	485	476	+9		126–132	119–122 (OT)	—	126–116	114–106
4	Atlanta Hawks	4	1	3	499	531	−32		152–157	105–128	116–126	—	126–120
5	Detroit Pistons	4	0	4	439	484	−45		113–136	100–108	106–114	120–126	—

Source: NBA
Rules for classification: Tiebreakers

2023–24 game log
Total: 1–3 (Home: 0–2; Road: 1–1)
In-Season Tournament: 1–3 (home: 0–2; road: 1–1)

Game	Date	Team	Score	High points	High rebounds	High assists	Location Attendance	Record
1	November 14	@ Detroit	W 126–120	Dejounte Murray (32)	Onyeka Okongwu (9)	Dejounte Murray (9)	Little Caesars Arena; 16,963	1–0
2	November 17	Philadelphia	L 116–126	Trae Young (22)	Clint Capela (11)	Trae Young (13)	State Farm Arena; 17,067	1–1
3	November 21	Indiana	L 152–157	Trae Young (38)	Saddiq Bey (10)	Trae Young (8)	State Farm Arena; 17,162	1–2
4	November 28	@ Cleveland	L 105–128	Bogdanović, Hunter (18)	Capela, Okongwu (9)	Trae Young (10)	Rocket Mortgage FieldHouse; 19,432	1–3

2023–24 season schedule

== Player statistics ==
Legend
GP	Games played	GS	Games started	MPG	Minutes per game
FG%	Field-goal percentage	3P%	3-point field-goal percentage	FT%	Free-throw percentage
RPG	Rebounds per game	APG	Assists per game	SPG	Steals per game
BPG	Blocks per game	PPG	Points per game

=== Regular season ===
As of April 15, 2024

Player	GP	GS	MPG	FG%	3P%	FT%	RPG	APG	SPG	BPG	PPG
Saddiq Bey	63	51	32.7	.416	.316	.837	6.5	1.5	0.8	0.2	13.7
Bogdan Bogdanović	79	33	30.4	.428	.374	.921	3.4	3.1	1.2	0.3	16.9
Kobe Bufkin	17	0	11.5	.370	.225	.500	1.9	1.6	0.4	0.3	4.8
Clint Capela	73	73	25.8	.571	.000	.631	10.6	1.2	0.6	1.5	11.5
Bruno Fernando	45	2	15.2	.583	.000	.667	4.3	1.0	0.6	0.6	6.3
Trent Forrest	38	0	10.9	.378	.200	.765	1.3	2.4	0.3	0.1	2.2
AJ Griffin	20	0	8.6	.290	.256	1.000	0.9	0.3	0.1	0.1	2.4
Mouhamed Gueye	6	0	12.2	.348	.333	.833	3.7	0.7	0.8	0.7	4.0
De'Andre Hunter	57	37	29.5	.459	.385	.847	3.9	1.5	0.7	0.3	15.6
Jalen Johnson	56	52	33.7	.511	.355	.728	8.7	3.6	1.2	0.8	16.0
Vít Krejčí^{≠}	22	14	24.6	.490	.412	.833	2.4	2.3	0.6	0.3	6.1
Seth Lundy	9	0	5.8	.235	.231	.750	0.8	0.0	0.0	0.0	1.6
Garrison Mathews	66	5	15.0	.456	.440	.810	1.4	0.6	0.3	0.1	4.9
Wesley Matthews	36	3	11.5	.351	.348	.750	1.5	0.6	0.4	0.3	3.1
Patty Mills^{~}	19	0	10.6	.373	.382	.000	1.1	0.7	0.5	0.1	2.7
Dejounte Murray	78	78	35.7	.459	.363	.794	5.3	6.4	1.4	0.3	22.5
Onyeka Okongwu	55	8	25.5	.611	.333	.793	6.8	1.3	0.5	1.1	10.2
Dylan Windler^{≠}	6	0	12.2	.526	.471	.000	2.0	0.5	0.3	0.0	4.7
Trae Young	54	54	36.0	.430	.373	.855	2.8	10.8	1.3	0.2	25.7

^{‡}Traded during the season
^{≠}Acquired during the season
^{~}Waived during the season
^{10}Signed 10-day contract

== Transactions ==
=== Contract Extensions ===
Date	Player	Signed	Ref.
July 6, 2023	Dejounte Murray	4 Year, $120 Million	
July 10, 2023	Bruno Fernando	1 Year, $2.6 Million	
October 22, 2023	Jalen Johnson	2 Year, $7.4 Million	
October 22, 2023	AJ Griffin	1 Year, $3.9 Million	
October 23, 2023	Onyeka Okongwu	4 Year, $62 Million	
February 29, 2024	Trent Forrest	1 Year, $0.5 Million	

=== Trades ===
June 26, 2022	To Atlanta Hawks Draft rights to Mouhamed Gueye (No. 39)	To Boston Celtics 2027 ATL second-round pick
July 7, 2023	To Atlanta Hawks Rudy Gay; 2026 MEM protected second-round pick	To Utah Jazz John Collins
July 8, 2023	To Atlanta Hawks Usman Garuba; TyTy Washington Jr. 2025 MIN second-round pick 2028 HOU second-round pick Cash considerations	To Houston Rockets Draft rights to Alpha Kaba (2017 No. 60)
July 12, 2023	To Atlanta Hawks Patty Mills	To Oklahoma City Thunder TyTy Washington Jr. Usman Garuba; Rudy Gay; 2026 MEM protected second-round pick

=== Free agency ===
==== Re-signed ====
Date	Player	Signed	Ref.
September 12, 2023	Trent Forrest	Two-Way Contract	

==== Additions ====
Date	Player	Signed	Former team	Ref.
July 6, 2023	Miles Norris	Two-Way Contract	UC Santa Barbara (Undrafted in 2023)	
July 21, 2023	Wesley Matthews	1 Year, $3.2M	Milwaukee Bucks	
December 22, 2023	Vít Krejčí	Two-Way Contract	Iowa Wolves	
March 4, 2024	Dylan Windler	Two-Way Contract	Los Angeles Lakers	

=== Subtractions ===
Date	Player	Reason	New team	Ref.
June 26, 2023	Donovan Williams	Waived	Santa Cruz Warriors	
July 6, 2023	Aaron Holiday	Free Agent	Houston Rockets	
July 21, 2023	Tyrese Martin	Waived	Iowa Wolves	
August 17, 2023	Vít Krejčí	Waived	Iowa Wolves	
December 22, 2023	Miles Norris	Waived	College Park Skyhawks	
February 29, 2024	Patty Mills	Waived	Miami Heat	
