= 2023–24 Cleveland Cavaliers season =

2023–24 NBA season by team

- Head coach: J. B. Bickerstaff
- President: Koby Altman
- General manager: Mike Gansey
- Owner: Dan Gilbert
- Arena: Rocket Mortgage FieldHouse

Results
- Record: 48–34 (.585)
- Place: Division: 2nd (Central); Conference: 4th (Eastern)
- Playoff finish: Conference semifinals (lost to Celtics 1–4)
- Stats at Basketball Reference

Local media
- Television: Bally Sports Ohio; Gray Television (Note: Affiliates include: WUAB (Cleveland); WXIX-TV/WXIX-DT3 (Cincinnati); WBNS-TV/WCMH-TV (Columbus); WBDT/WHIO-DT2 (Dayton); WTRF-DT2 (Steubenville/Wheeling); WYTV-DT2 (Youngstown); WPKD/WPNT (Pittsburgh)) (5 games)
- Radio: WTAM · WMMS

The 2023–24 Cleveland Cavaliers season was the 54th season for the franchise in the National Basketball Association (NBA). They entered the season coming off a championship win in the NBA Summer League. The Cavaliers clinched a playoff berth on April 12, following a 129–120 win over the Indiana Pacers. In the playoffs, they beat the Orlando Magic in seven games in the first round, advancing to the semifinals for the first time without LeBron James since drafting him. However, they were eliminated by the eventual NBA champion Boston Celtics in five games in the second round.

The Cleveland Cavaliers drew an average home attendance of 19,345 in 41 home games in the 2023-24 NBA season.

== Draft ==
Round	Pick	Player	Position(s)	Nationality	College / Club
2	49	Emoni Bates	G/F	United States	Eastern Michigan (So.)

The Cavaliers entered the draft with one second-round pick. Their first-round pick was conveyed to the Indiana Pacers as part of the 2022 Caris LeVert trade, as it fell outside the top-14 protection when Cleveland qualified for the 2023 NBA playoffs.

With their only pick, they selected Emoni Bates from Eastern Michigan.

== Roster ==
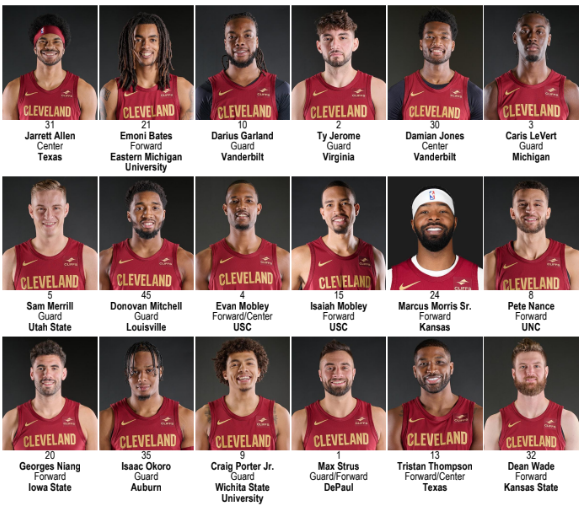

2023–24 Cleveland Cavaliers roster
Players

Pos.	No.	Player	Height	Weight	DOB	From
C	31	Jarrett Allen (injured)	6 ft 11 in (2.11 m)	243 lb (110 kg)	1998-04-21	Texas
F	21	Emoni Bates (TW)	6 ft 9 in (2.06 m)	190 lb (86 kg)	2004-01-28	Eastern Michigan
G	10	Darius Garland	6 ft 1 in (1.85 m)	192 lb (87 kg)	2000-01-26	Vanderbilt
G	2	Ty Jerome (injured)	6 ft 5 in (1.96 m)	195 lb (88 kg)	1997-07-08	Virginia
C	30	Damian Jones	6 ft 10 in (2.08 m)	245 lb (111 kg)	1995-06-30	Vanderbilt
G/F	3	Caris LeVert (injured)	6 ft 6 in (1.98 m)	205 lb (93 kg)	1994-08-25	Michigan
G	5	Sam Merrill	6 ft 4 in (1.93 m)	205 lb (93 kg)	1996-05-15	Utah State
G	45	Donovan Mitchell (injured)	6 ft 1 in (1.85 m)	215 lb (98 kg)	1996-09-07	Louisville
F/C	4	Evan Mobley	6 ft 11 in (2.11 m)	215 lb (98 kg)	2001-06-18	USC
F	15	Isaiah Mobley (TW)	6 ft 8 in (2.03 m)	238 lb (108 kg)	1999-09-24	USC
F	24	Marcus Morris Sr.	6 ft 8 in (2.03 m)	218 lb (99 kg)	1989-09-02	Kansas
F	8	Pete Nance (TW)	6 ft 10 in (2.08 m)	225 lb (102 kg)	2000-02-19	North Carolina
F	20	Georges Niang	6 ft 7 in (2.01 m)	230 lb (104 kg)	1993-06-17	Iowa State
G/F	35	Isaac Okoro	6 ft 5 in (1.96 m)	225 lb (102 kg)	2001-01-26	Auburn
G	9	Craig Porter Jr. (injured)	6 ft 2 in (1.88 m)	186 lb (84 kg)	2000-02-26	Wichita State
G/F	1	Max Strus	6 ft 5 in (1.96 m)	215 lb (98 kg)	1996-03-28	DePaul
F/C	13	Tristan Thompson	6 ft 9 in (2.06 m)	254 lb (115 kg)	1991-03-13	Texas
F/C	32	Dean Wade	6 ft 9 in (2.06 m)	228 lb (103 kg)	1996-11-20	Kansas State

Coaches
Head coach
- J. B. Bickerstaff
Assistant(s)
- Greg Buckner (associate HC)
- Omar Cook
- Dan Geriot
- Sidney Lowe
- J. J. Outlaw
- Nate Reinking
- Luke Walton

Legend
- (DP) Unsigned draft pick
- (FA) Free agent
- (S) Suspended
- (GL) On assignment to G League affiliate
- (TW) Two-way affiliate player
- (L) On personal leave
- Injured

Roster
Updated: March 29, 2024

== Standings ==
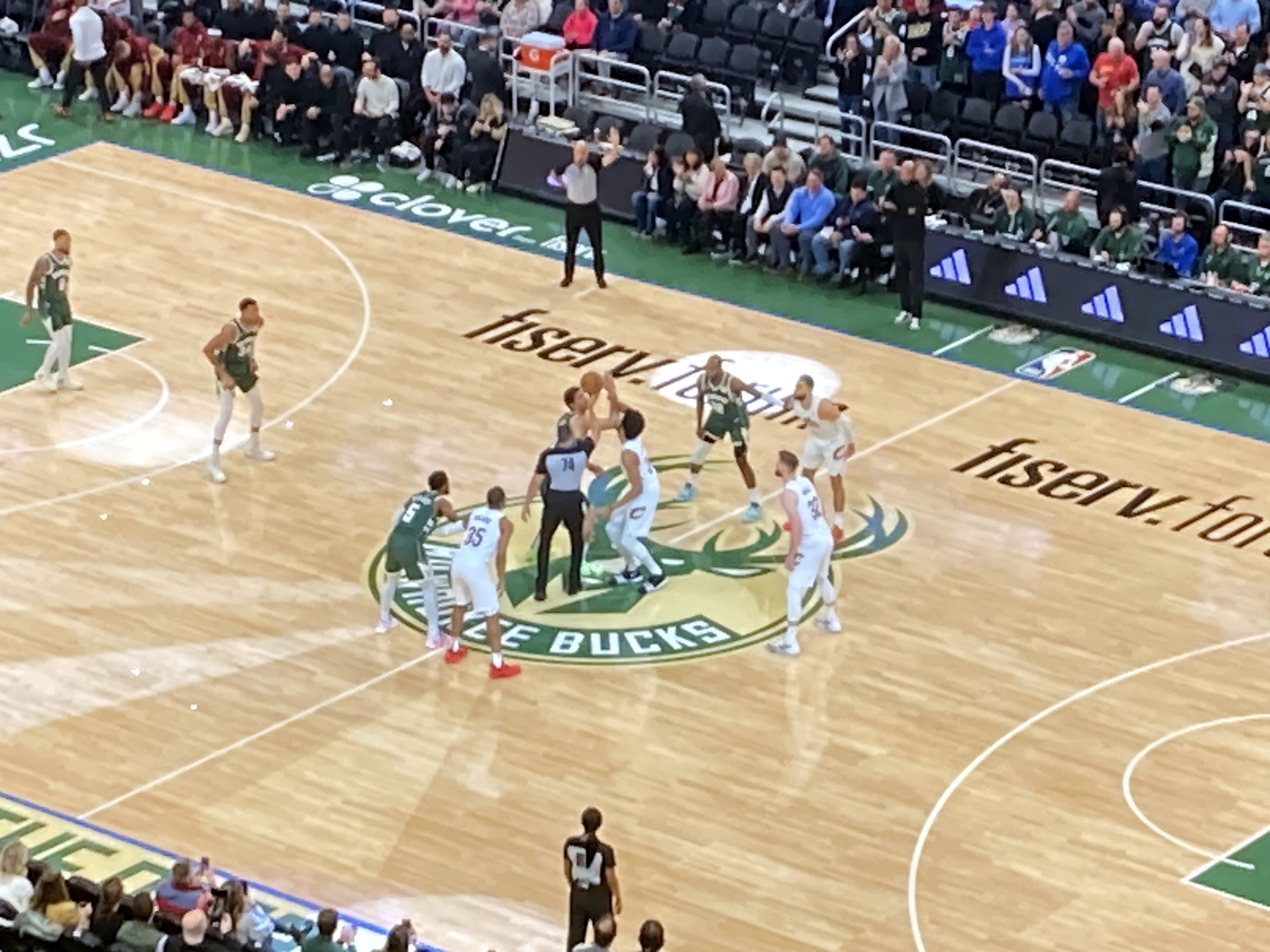
The Cavaliers playing at Milwaukee

=== Division ===
Central Division	W	L	PCT	GB	Home	Road	Div	GP
y – Milwaukee Bucks	49	33	.598	–	31‍–‍11	18‍–‍22	10‍–‍7	82
x – Cleveland Cavaliers	48	34	.585	1.0	26‍–‍15	22‍–‍19	11‍–‍5	82
x – Indiana Pacers	47	35	.573	2.0	26‍–‍15	21‍–‍20	11‍–‍6	82
pi – Chicago Bulls	39	43	.476	10.0	20‍–‍21	19‍–‍22	7‍–‍9	82
Detroit Pistons	14	68	.171	35.0	7‍–‍33	7‍–‍35	2‍–‍14	82

=== Conference ===
Eastern Conference
#	Team	W	L	PCT	GB	GP
1	z – Boston Celtics *	64	18	.780	–	82
2	x – New York Knicks	50	32	.610	14.0	82
3	y – Milwaukee Bucks *	49	33	.598	15.0	82
4	x – Cleveland Cavaliers	48	34	.585	16.0	82
5	y – Orlando Magic *	47	35	.573	17.0	82
6	x – Indiana Pacers	47	35	.573	17.0	82
7	x – Philadelphia 76ers	47	35	.573	17.0	82
8	x – Miami Heat	46	36	.561	18.0	82
9	pi – Chicago Bulls	39	43	.476	25.0	82
10	pi – Atlanta Hawks	36	46	.439	28.0	82
11	Brooklyn Nets	32	50	.390	32.0	82
12	Toronto Raptors	25	57	.305	39.0	82
13	Charlotte Hornets	21	61	.256	43.0	82
14	Washington Wizards	15	67	.183	49.0	82
15	Detroit Pistons	14	68	.171	50.0	82

== Game log ==
=== Preseason ===
2023 preseason game log
Total: 1–3 (Home: 1–1; Road: 0–2)
Preseason: 1–3 (home: 1–1; road: 0–2)

Game	Date	Team	Score	High points	High rebounds	High assists	Location Attendance	Record
1	October 10	@ Atlanta	L 107–108	Isaac Okoro (19)	Evan Mobley (9)	Sharife Cooper (6)	State Farm Arena; 11,659	0–1
2	October 12	Orlando	L 105–108	Darius Garland (19)	Strus, Wade (6)	Ty Jerome (6)	Rocket Mortgage FieldHouse; 9,265	0–2
3	October 16	Maccabi Ra'anana	W 120–89	Emoni Bates (16)	Dean Wade (8)	Jerome, Porter Jr. (6)	Rocket Mortgage FieldHouse; 13,377	1–2
4	October 20	@ Indiana	L 104–109	Donovan Mitchell (28)	Evan Mobley (8)	Ty Jerome (5)	Gainbridge Fieldhouse; 10,470	1–3

2023–24 preseason schedule

=== Regular season ===
2023–24 game log
Total: 48–34 (Home: 26–15; Road: 22–19)
October: 1–3 (home: 0–3; road: 1–0)

Game	Date	Team	Score	High points	High rebounds	High assists	Location Attendance	Record
1	October 25	@ Brooklyn	W 114–113	Mitchell, Strus (27)	Max Strus (12)	Donovan Mitchell (6)	Barclays Center; 17,931	1–0
2	October 27	Oklahoma City	L 105–108	Donovan Mitchell (43)	Evan Mobley (15)	Donovan Mitchell (5)	Rocket Mortgage FieldHouse; 19,432	1–1
3	October 28	Indiana	L 113–125	Evan Mobley (33)	Evan Mobley (14)	Caris LeVert (8)	Rocket Mortgage FieldHouse; 19,432	1–2
4	October 31	New York	L 91–109	Donovan Mitchell (26)	Evan Mobley (12)	Evan Mobley (5)	Rocket Mortgage FieldHouse; 19,432	1–3

November: 9–6 (home: 5–3; road: 4–3)

Game	Date	Team	Score	High points	High rebounds	High assists	Location Attendance	Record
5	November 1	@ New York	W 95–89	Donovan Mitchell (30)	Georges Niang (10)	LeVert, Mobley (5)	Madison Square Garden; 19,812	2–3
6	November 3	@ Indiana	L 116–121	Donovan Mitchell (38)	Evan Mobley (10)	Donovan Mitchell (9)	Gainbridge Fieldhouse; 16,744	2–4
7	November 5	Golden State	W 115–104	Donovan Mitchell (31)	Evan Mobley (16)	Garland, Mitchell (7)	Rocket Mortgage FieldHouse; 19,432	3–4
8	November 8	@ Oklahoma City	L 120–128	Caris LeVert (29)	Max Strus (7)	Darius Garland (9)	Paycom Center; 16,314	3–5
9	November 11	@ Golden State	W 118–110	Caris LeVert (22)	Max Strus (8)	Donovan Mitchell (5)	Chase Center; 18,064	4–5
10	November 13	@ Sacramento	L 120–132	Donovan Mitchell (22)	Evan Mobley (12)	Darius Garland (6)	Golden 1 Center; 17,829	4–6
11	November 15	@ Portland	W 109–95	Donovan Mitchell (34)	Evan Mobley (12)	Max Strus (7)	Moda Center; 18,137	5–6
12	November 17	Detroit	W 108–100	Darius Garland (28)	Evan Mobley (10)	Mobley, Porter Jr. (5)	Rocket Mortgage FieldHouse; 19,432	6–6
13	November 19	Denver	W 121–109	Darius Garland (26)	Mobley, Wade (10)	Darius Garland (6)	Rocket Mortgage FieldHouse; 19,432	7–6
14	November 21	@ Philadelphia	W 122–119 (OT)	Darius Garland (32)	Jarrett Allen (13)	Craig Porter Jr. (9)	Wells Fargo Center; 20,565	8–6
15	November 22	Miami	L 96–129	Craig Porter Jr. (16)	Evan Mobley (10)	Craig Porter Jr. (5)	Rocket Mortgage FieldHouse; 19,432	8–7
16	November 25	L.A. Lakers	L 115–121	Donovan Mitchell (22)	Jarrett Allen (14)	Caris LeVert (8)	Rocket Mortgage FieldHouse; 19,432	8–8
17	November 26	Toronto	W 105–102	Darius Garland (24)	Evan Mobley (14)	Darius Garland (8)	Rocket Mortgage FieldHouse; 19,432	9–8
18	November 28	Atlanta	W 128–105	Donovan Mitchell (40)	Evan Mobley (19)	Darius Garland (8)	Rocket Mortgage FieldHouse; 19,432	10–8
19	November 30	Portland	L 95–103	Donovan Mitchell (23)	Jarrett Allen (10)	Darius Garland (7)	Rocket Mortgage FieldHouse; 19,432	10–9

December: 8–5 (home: 4–2; road: 4–3)

Game	Date	Team	Score	High points	High rebounds	High assists	Location Attendance	Record
20	December 2	@ Detroit	W 110–101	Garland, Strus (22)	Allen, Mobley (11)	Garland, Strus (5)	Little Caesars Arena; 18,924	11–9
21	December 6	Orlando	W 121–111	Donovan Mitchell (35)	Jarrett Allen (11)	Darius Garland (9)	Rocket Mortgage FieldHouse; 19,432	12–9
22	December 8	@ Miami	W 111–99	Donovan Mitchell (27)	Donovan Mitchell (13)	Garland, Mitchell (6)	Kaseya Center; 19,600	13–9
23	December 11	@ Orlando	L 94–104	Darius Garland (36)	Tristan Thompson (13)	Darius Garland (5)	Amway Center; 19,032	13–10
24	December 12	@ Boston	L 113–120	Donovan Mitchell (29)	Max Strus (9)	Darius Garland (7)	TD Garden; 19,156	13–11
25	December 14	@ Boston	L 107–116	Donovan Mitchell (31)	Jarrett Allen (10)	Donovan Mitchell (6)	TD Garden; 19,156	13–12
26	December 16	Atlanta	W 127–119	Jarrett Allen (25)	Jarrett Allen (14)	Donovan Mitchell (13)	Rocket Mortgage FieldHouse; 19,432	14–12
27	December 18	Houston	W 135–130 (OT)	Donovan Mitchell (37)	LeVert, Okoro (7)	Mitchell, Okoro (6)	Rocket Mortgage FieldHouse; 19,432	15–12
28	December 20	Utah	W 124–116	Sam Merrill (27)	Jarrett Allen (8)	Caris LeVert (7)	Rocket Mortgage FieldHouse; 19,432	16–12
29	December 21	New Orleans	L 104–123	Dean Wade (20)	Dean Wade (9)	Craig Porter Jr. (11)	Rocket Mortgage FieldHouse; 19,432	16–13
30	December 23	@ Chicago	W 109–95	Max Strus (26)	Jarrett Allen (17)	Craig Porter Jr. (8)	United Center; 19.583	17–13
31	December 27	@ Dallas	W 113–110	Caris LeVert (29)	Jarrett Allen (23)	LeVert, Porter Jr. (7)	American Airlines Center; 20,377	18–13
32	December 29	Milwaukee	L 111–119	Donovan Mitchell (34)	Jarrett Allen (12)	Donovan Mitchell (9)	Rocket Mortgage FieldHouse; 19,432	18–14

January: 11–2 (home: 8–0; road: 3–2)

Game	Date	Team	Score	High points	High rebounds	High assists	Location Attendance	Record
33	January 1	@ Toronto	L 121–124	Caris LeVert (31)	Jarrett Allen (11)	Donovan Mitchell (7)	Scotiabank Arena; 19,800	18–15
34	January 3	Washington	W 140–101	Max Strus (24)	Jarrett Allen (19)	Jarrett Allen (7)	Rocket Mortgage FieldHouse; 19,432	19–15
35	January 5	Washington	W 114–90	Donovan Mitchell (26)	Jarrett Allen (12)	Caris LeVert (11)	Rocket Mortgage FieldHouse; 19,432	20–15
36	January 7	San Antonio	W 117–115	Jarrett Allen (29)	Jarrett Allen (16)	Donovan Mitchell (9)	Rocket Mortgage FieldHouse; 19,432	21–15
37	January 11	Brooklyn	W 111–102	Donovan Mitchell (45)	Allen, Mitchell (12)	Donovan Mitchell (6)	(France) Accor Arena; 15,887	22–15
38	January 15	Chicago	W 109–91	Donovan Mitchell (34)	Jarrett Allen (14)	LeVert, Mitchell (7)	Rocket Mortgage FieldHouse; 19,432	23–15
39	January 17	Milwaukee	W 135–95	Georges Niang (33)	Jarrett Allen (13)	Mitchell, Okoro (7)	Rocket Mortgage FieldHouse; 19,432	24–15
40	January 20	@ Atlanta	W 116–95	Merrill, Mitchell (18)	Jarrett Allen (11)	Donovan Mitchell (8)	State Farm Arena; 17,047	25–15
41	January 22	@ Orlando	W 126–99	Sam Merrill (26)	Jarrett Allen (11)	Donovan Mitchell (13)	Kia Center; 19,301	26–15
42	January 24	@ Milwaukee	L 116–126	Donovan Mitchell (23)	Jarrett Allen (12)	Donovan Mitchell (8)	Fiserv Forum; 17,510	26–16
43	January 26	@ Milwaukee	W 112–100	Donovan Mitchell (32)	Jarrett Allen (14)	Donovan Mitchell (6)	Fiserv Forum; 17,510	27–16
44	January 29	L.A. Clippers	W 118–108	Donovan Mitchell (28)	Jarrett Allen (17)	Donovan Mitchell (12)	Rocket Mortgage FieldHouse; 19,432	28–16
45	January 31	Detroit	W 128–121	Donovan Mitchell (45)	Jarrett Allen (11)	Donovan Mitchell (8)	Rocket Mortgage FieldHouse; 19,432	29–16

February: 9–4 (home: 3–2; road: 6–2)

Game	Date	Team	Score	High points	High rebounds	High assists	Location Attendance	Record
46	February 1	@ Memphis	W 108–101	Donovan Mitchell (25)	Max Strus (10)	Garland, Mitchell (7)	FedExForum; 15,505	30–16
47	February 3	@ San Antonio	W 117–101	Donovan Mitchell (31)	Jarrett Allen (16)	Donovan Mitchell (7)	Frost Bank Center; 18,354	31–16
48	February 5	Sacramento	W 136–110	Donovan Mitchell (29)	Evan Mobley (14)	LeVert, Mobley (7)	Rocket Mortgage FieldHouse; 19,432	32–16
49	February 7	@ Washington	W 114–106	Donovan Mitchell (40)	Jarrett Allen (9)	LeVert, Mitchell (5)	Capital One Arena; 15,860	33–16
50	February 8	@ Brooklyn	W 118–95	Donovan Mitchell (27)	Evan Mobley (12)	Darius Garland (7)	Barclays Center; 17,304	34–16
51	February 10	@ Toronto	W 119–95	Jarrett Allen (18)	Jarrett Allen (15)	Darius Garland (8)	Scotiabank Arena; 19,800	35–16
52	February 12	Philadelphia	L 121–123	Donovan Mitchell (36)	Allen, Mobley (10)	Darius Garland (9)	Rocket Mortgage FieldHouse; 19,432	35–17
53	February 14	Chicago	W 108–105	Donovan Mitchell (30)	Jarrett Allen (10)	Caris LeVert (9)	Rocket Mortgage FieldHouse; 19,432	36–17
All-Star Game
54	February 22	Orlando	L 109–116	Allen, Garland, Strus (18)	Jarrett Allen (10)	Darius Garland (10)	Rocket Mortgage FieldHouse; 19,432	36–18
55	February 23	@ Philadelphia	L 97–104	Jarrett Allen (24)	Evan Mobley (10)	Darius Garland (9)	Wells Fargo Center; 19,938	36–19
56	February 25	@ Washington	W 114–105	Jarrett Allen (22)	Allen, LeVert (12)	Caris LeVert (8)	Capital One Arena; 17,895	37–19
57	February 27	Dallas	W 121–119	Donovan Mitchell (31)	Allen, Mobley (9)	Garland, Mobley (7)	Rocket Mortgage FieldHouse; 19,432	38–19
58	February 28	@ Chicago	L 123–132 (2OT)	Evan Mobley (25)	Evan Mobley (13)	Caris LeVert (15)	United Center; 21,700	38–20

March : 7–10 (home: 4–4; road: 3–6)

Game	Date	Team	Score	High points	High rebounds	High assists	Location Attendance	Record
59	March 1	@ Detroit	W 110–100	Darius Garland (29)	Evan Mobley (17)	Evan Mobley (7)	Little Caesars Arena; 19,299	39–20
60	March 3	New York	L 98–107	Sam Merrill (21)	Evan Mobley (13)	Allen, Mobley (6)	Rocket Mortgage FieldHouse; 19,432	39–21
61	March 5	Boston	W 105–104	Dean Wade (23)	Jarrett Allen (12)	Darius Garland (11)	Rocket Mortgage FieldHouse; 19,432	40–21
62	March 6	@ Atlanta	L 101–112	Jarrett Allen (18)	Jarrett Allen (19)	Garland, LeVert (7)	State Farm Arena; 15,841	40–22
63	March 8	Minnesota	W 113–104 (OT)	Darius Garland (34)	Jarrett Allen (18)	Garland, LeVert (8)	Rocket Mortgage FieldHouse; 19,432	41–22
64	March 10	Brooklyn	L 101–120	Georges Niang (20)	Jarrett Allen (9)	Caris LeVert (7)	Rocket Mortgage FieldHouse; 19,432	41–23
65	March 11	Phoenix	L 111–117	Darius Garland (30)	Jarrett Allen (10)	Caris LeVert (11)	Rocket Mortgage FieldHouse; 19,432	41–24
66	March 13	@ New Orleans	W 116–95	Darius Garland (27)	Jarrett Allen (10)	Darius Garland (11)	Smoothie King Center; 17,727	42–24
67	March 16	@ Houston	L 103–117	Caris LeVert (21)	Sam Merrill (8)	Caris LeVert (7)	Toyota Center; 18,055	42–25
68	March 18	@ Indiana	W 108–103	Allen, LeVert (23)	Jarrett Allen (9)	Caris LeVert (11)	Gainbridge Fieldhouse; 17,274	43–25
69	March 20	Miami	L 104–107	Jarrett Allen (25)	Jarrett Allen (20)	Caris LeVert (12)	Rocket Mortgage FieldHouse; 19,432	43–26
70	March 22	@ Minnesota	L 91–104	Darius Garland (19)	Jarrett Allen (13)	Caris LeVert (6)	Target Center; 18,024	43–27
71	March 24	@ Miami	L 84–121	Evan Mobley (15)	four players (4)	Sam Merrill (6)	Kaseya Center; 19,645	43–28
72	March 25	Charlotte	W 115–92	Allen, Mobley, Niang (17)	Jarrett Allen (13)	Darius Garland (10)	Rocket Mortgage FieldHouse; 19,432	44–28
73	March 27	@ Charlotte	L 111–118	Jarrett Allen (24)	Jarrett Allen (8)	Darius Garland (12)	Spectrum Center; 15,303	44–29
74	March 29	Philadelphia	W 117–114	Georges Niang (25)	Allen, Mobley (11)	Darius Garland (12)	Rocket Mortgage FieldHouse; 19,432	45–29
75	March 31	@ Denver	L 101–130	Evan Mobley (23)	Caris LeVert (6)	Darius Garland (7)	Ball Arena; 19,621	45–30

April: 3–4 (home: 2–1; road: 1–3)

Game	Date	Team	Score	High points	High rebounds	High assists	Location Attendance	Record
76	April 2	@ Utah	W 129–113	Caris LeVert (26)	Jarrett Allen (12)	Darius Garland (8)	Delta Center; 18,206	46–30
77	April 3	@ Phoenix	L 101–122	Donovan Mitchell (24)	Max Strus (12)	Garland, Strus (8)	Footprint Center; 17,071	46–31
78	April 6	@ L.A. Lakers	L 97–116	Darius Garland (26)	Jarrett Allen (12)	Donovan Mitchell (7)	Crypto.com Arena; 18,997	46–32
79	April 7	@ L.A. Clippers	L 118–120	Darius Garland (28)	Jarrett Allen (10)	Max Strus (9)	Crypto.com Arena; 19,370	46–33
80	April 10	Memphis	W 110–98	Donovan Mitchell (29)	Evan Mobley (12)	Darius Garland (9)	Rocket Mortgage FieldHouse; 19,432	47–33
81	April 12	Indiana	W 129–120	Donovan Mitchell (33)	Jarrett Allen (13)	Max Strus (9)	Rocket Mortgage FieldHouse; 19,432	48–33
82	April 14	Charlotte	L 110–120	Georges Niang (16)	Max Strus (10)	Max Strus (11)	Rocket Mortgage FieldHouse; 19,432	48–34

2023–24 season schedule

=== Playoffs ===
2024 playoff game log
Total: 5–7 (home: 4–2; road: 1–5)
First round: 4–3 (home: 4–0; road: 0–3)

Game	Date	Team	Score	High points	High rebounds	High assists	Location Attendance	Series
1	April 20	Orlando	W 97–83	Donovan Mitchell (30)	Jarrett Allen (18)	Darius Garland (8)	Rocket Mortgage FieldHouse; 19,432	1–0
2	April 22	Orlando	W 96–86	Donovan Mitchell (23)	Jarrett Allen (20)	Garland, Mitchell, Strus (4)	Rocket Mortgage FieldHouse; 19,432	2–0
3	April 25	@ Orlando	L 83–121	Allen, LeVert (15)	Jarrett Allen (8)	Donovan Mitchell (7)	Kia Center; 18,846	2–1
4	April 27	@ Orlando	L 89–112	Jarrett Allen (21)	Allen, Mobley (9)	Garland, Mitchell (6)	Kia Center; 18,933	2–2
5	April 30	Orlando	W 104–103	Donovan Mitchell (28)	Evan Mobley (13)	Garland, Strus (5)	Rocket Mortgage FieldHouse; 19,432	3–2
6	May 3	@ Orlando	L 96–103	Donovan Mitchell (50)	Morris Sr., Strus (8)	Darius Garland (5)	Kia Center; 19,193	3–3
7	May 5	Orlando	W 106–94	Donovan Mitchell (39)	Evan Mobley (16)	Donovan Mitchell (5)	Rocket Mortgage FieldHouse; 19,432	4–3

Conference semifinals: 1–4 (home: 0–2; road: 1–2)

Game	Date	Team	Score	High points	High rebounds	High assists	Location Attendance	Series
1	May 7	@ Boston	L 95–120	Donovan Mitchell (33)	Evan Mobley (13)	Garland, Mitchell (5)	TD Garden; 19,156	0–1
2	May 9	@ Boston	W 118–94	Donovan Mitchell (29)	Evan Mobley (10)	Donovan Mitchell (8)	TD Garden; 19,156	1–1
3	May 11	Boston	L 93–106	Donovan Mitchell (33)	Evan Mobley (8)	Darius Garland (6)	Rocket Mortgage FieldHouse; 19,432	1–2
4	May 13	Boston	L 102–109	Darius Garland (30)	Evan Mobley (9)	Garland, Strus (7)	Rocket Mortgage FieldHouse; 19,432	1–3
5	May 15	@ Boston	L 98–113	Evan Mobley (33)	Mobley, Strus (7)	Garland, Strus (9)	TD Garden; 19,156	1–4

2024 playoff schedule

=== In-Season Tournament ===
This was the first regular season where all the NBA teams competed in a mid-season tournament setting due to the implementation of the 2023 NBA In-Season Tournament. During the in-season tournament period, the Cavaliers competed in Group A of the Eastern Conference, which included the Philadelphia 76ers, Atlanta Hawks, Indiana Pacers, and Detroit Pistons.

==== East group A ====
Pos	Team	Pld	W	L	PF	PA	PD	Qualification	IND	CLE	PHI	ATL	DET
1	Indiana Pacers	4	4	0	546	507	+39	Advance to knockout stage	—	121–116	132–126	157–152	136–113
2	Cleveland Cavaliers	4	3	1	474	445	+29		116–121	—	122–119 (OT)	128–105	108–100
3	Philadelphia 76ers	4	2	2	485	476	+9		126–132	119–122 (OT)	—	126–116	114–106
4	Atlanta Hawks	4	1	3	499	531	−32		152–157	105–128	116–126	—	126–120
5	Detroit Pistons	4	0	4	439	484	−45		113–136	100–108	106–114	120–126	—

Source: NBA
Rules for classification: Tiebreakers

== Player statistics ==
Legend
GP	Games played	GS	Games started	MPG	Minutes per game
FG%	Field-goal percentage	3P%	3-point field-goal percentage	FT%	Free-throw percentage
RPG	Rebounds per game	APG	Assists per game	SPG	Steals per game
BPG	Blocks per game	PPG	Points per game

=== Regular season ===
Cleveland Cavaliers statistics
Player	GP	GS	MPG	FG%	3P%	FT%	RPG	APG	SPG	BPG	PPG
Jarrett Allen	77	77	31.7	.634	.000	.742	10.5	2.7	.7	1.1	16.5
Emoni Bates	15	0	8.9	.306	.303	.250	.9	.7	.1	.1	2.7
Darius Garland	57	57	33.4	.446	.371	.834	2.7	6.5	1.3	.1	18.0
Ty Jerome	2	0	7.5	.500	.000		.5	1.5	.0	.0	2.0
Damian Jones	39	0	6.9	.597	.214	.857	1.6	.4	.2	.3	2.7
Caris LeVert	68	10	28.8	.421	.325	.766	4.1	5.1	1.1	.5	14.0
Sam Merrill	61	1	17.5	.402	.404	.929	2.0	1.8	.3	.1	8.0
Donovan Mitchell	55	55	35.3	.462	.368	.865	5.1	6.1	1.8	.5	26.6
Evan Mobley	50	50	30.6	.580	.373	.719	9.4	3.2	.9	1.4	15.7
Isaiah Mobley	10	0	7.2	.417	.300	.000	1.0	.6	.2	.0	2.3
Marcus Morris Sr.^{†}	12	0	15.0	.441	.414	.625	2.1	.8	.2	.2	5.8
Pete Nance	8	0	3.4	.167	1.000	.000	.4	.0	.1	.0	.4
Georges Niang	82	10	22.3	.449	.376	.850	3.4	1.2	.4	.2	9.4
Isaac Okoro	69	42	27.3	.490	.391	.679	3.0	1.9	.8	.5	9.4
Craig Porter Jr.	51	6	12.7	.509	.353	.732	2.1	2.3	.4	.3	5.6
Max Strus	70	70	32.0	.418	.351	.794	4.8	4.0	.9	.4	12.2
Tristan Thompson	49	0	11.2	.608	.000	.288	3.6	1.0	.2	.3	3.3
Dean Wade	54	32	20.5	.414	.391	.769	4.0	.8	.7	.5	5.4

=== Playoffs ===
Cleveland Cavaliers statistics
Player	GP	GS	MPG	FG%	3P%	FT%	RPG	APG	SPG	BPG	PPG
Jarrett Allen	4	4	31.8	.676		.692	13.8	1.3	1.3	1.0	17.0
Darius Garland	12	12	36.0	.427	.352	.810	3.6	5.8	1.1	.2	15.7
Damian Jones	2	0	4.5				1.0	1.0	.0	.5	.0
Caris LeVert	11	1	25.3	.431	.182	.654	3.6	2.3	.8	.5	10.1
Sam Merrill	10	0	12.5	.345	.370	1.000	1.2	.9	.0	.0	3.3
Donovan Mitchell	10	10	38.2	.476	.354	.815	5.4	4.7	1.3	.3	29.6
Evan Mobley	12	12	35.2	.555	.278	.694	9.3	2.3	.8	2.2	16.0
Marcus Morris Sr.	9	1	15.3	.458	.391	.667	2.8	.3	.4	.0	6.1
Georges Niang	10	0	12.1	.220	.130	.875	1.2	.4	.4	.2	2.8
Isaac Okoro	12	7	21.9	.357	.257	.778	1.8	1.1	.9	.3	5.5
Max Strus	12	12	36.2	.408	.347	1.000	5.3	2.9	.8	.0	9.5
Tristan Thompson	10	0	8.7	.438		.500	2.0	1.0	.1	.5	1.5
Dean Wade	3	1	21.0	.308	.300		2.0	1.7	.3	.7	3.7

- ^{†} Denotes player spent time with another team in the season. Stats reflect time with the Cavaliers only.

== Transactions ==
=== Trades ===
July 1, 2023
To Cleveland Cavaliers

Max Strus (sign-and-trade) (from Miami)

To Miami Heat

2026 LAL second-round pick (from Cleveland)
2027 second-round pick (from San Antonio) (Note: The worst of the picks originally belonging to Houston, Indiana, Miami, Oklahoma and San Antonio.)

To San Antonio Spurs

Cedi Osman (from Cleveland)
Lamar Stevens (from Cleveland)
2026 LAL second-round pick (from Miami) (Note: The worst of the picks originally belonging to Dallas, Oklahoma and Philadelphia.)
2030 second-round pick (from Cleveland)
Cash considerations (from Cleveland)

July 8, 2023
To Cleveland Cavaliers

Damian Jones
To Utah Jazz

Cash considerations

=== Free agency ===
==== Re-signed ====
Date	Player	Ref.
June 23, 2023	Lamar Stevens	
June 30, 2023	Caris LeVert	
July 7, 2023	Isaiah Mobley	

==== Additions ====
Date	Player	Former team	Ref.
June 23, 2023	Craig Porter Jr.	Wichita State Shockers (NCAA)	
June 24, 2023	Pete Nance	North Carolina Tar Heels (NCAA)	
June 25, 2023	Mike Bothwell	Furman Paladins (NCAA)	
July 6, 2023	Georges Niang	Philadelphia 76ers	
July 6, 2023	Ty Jerome	Golden State Warriors	

==== Subtractions ====
Date	Player	Reason left	New team	Ref.
July 7, 2023	Robin Lopez	Free agency	Milwaukee Bucks	
July 23, 2023	Raul Neto	Free agency	(Turkey) Fenerbahçe S.K.	
July 27, 2023	Dylan Windler	Free agency	New York Knicks	
January 4, 2024	Ricky Rubio	Retired	(Spain) FC Barcelona Bàsquet	
