= Dean Wade =

American basketball player (born 1996)

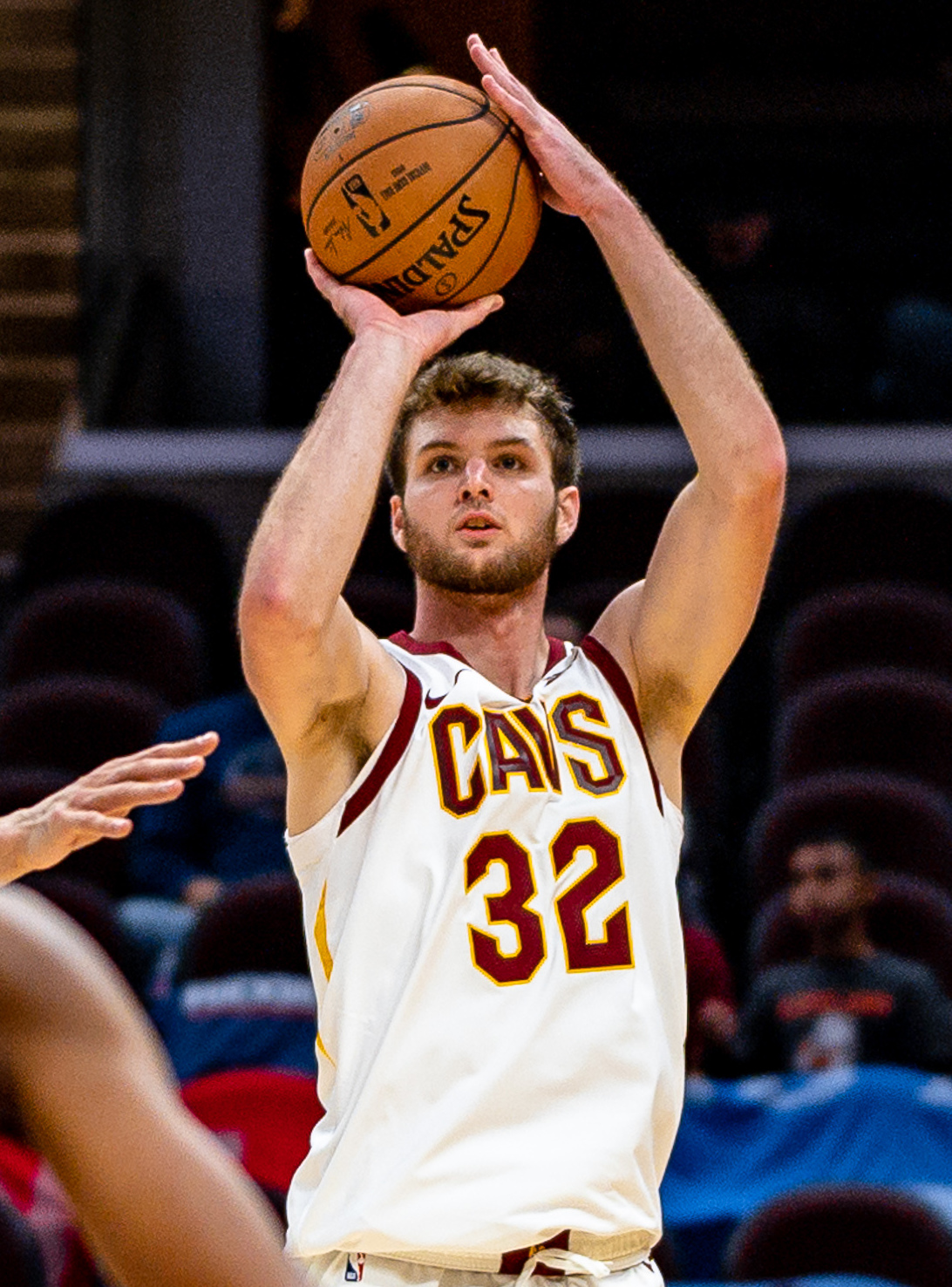
- Wade with the Cleveland Cavaliers in 2019

No. 45 – Philadelphia 76ers
- Position: Power forward / center
- League: NBA

Personal information
- Born: November 20, 1996 (age 29) Wichita, Kansas, U.S.
- Listed height: 6 ft 9 in (2.06 m)
- Listed weight: 228 lb (103 kg)

Career information
- High school: St. John (St. John, Kansas)
- College: Kansas State (2015–2019)
- NBA draft: 2019: undrafted
- Playing career: 2019–present

Career history
- 2019–2026: Cleveland Cavaliers
- 2019–2020: →Canton Charge
- 2026–present: Philadelphia 76ers

Career highlights
- 2× First-team All-Big 12 (2018, 2019); First-team Parade All-American (2015); Mr. Kansas Basketball (2015)
- Stats at NBA.com
- Stats at Basketball Reference

Dean Jackson Wade (born November 20, 1996) is an American professional basketball player for the Philadelphia 76ers of the National Basketball Association (NBA). He played college basketball for the Kansas State Wildcats.

== Early life ==
Wade was born in Wichita, Kansas, to Jay and Trish Wade. He lived in Inman, Kansas, briefly before moving to St. John at a young age. His mother is a track and volleyball coach at St. John High School in St. John, Kansas, where she led the volleyball team to three state championships. His father was briefly a member of the football team at Kansas State University.

== High school career ==
Wade played four years of varsity basketball at St. John High School in St. John, Kansas, earning All-State honors for multiple seasons and winning three state championships. As a senior, he was named Parade All-American, along with 29 other players in his class. He was also selected as Mr. Kansas Basketball by the Kansas Basketball Coaches Association (KBCA).

== College career ==
Wade was named to the Big 12 All-Newcomer Team at the conclusion of his freshman season at Kansas State. As a sophomore, he averaged 9.3 points, 4.5 rebounds and 1.8 assists per game. After a breakout junior season, Wade earned first-team All-Big 12 accolades. Wade averaged 16.2 points and 6.2 rebounds per game as a junior. As a senior, Wade averaged 12.9 points and a team-high 6.2 rebounds per game and was named to the first-team All-Big 12. His season was cut short by a foot injury.

== Professional career ==
=== Cleveland Cavaliers (2019–2026) ===
==== 2019–20 season ====
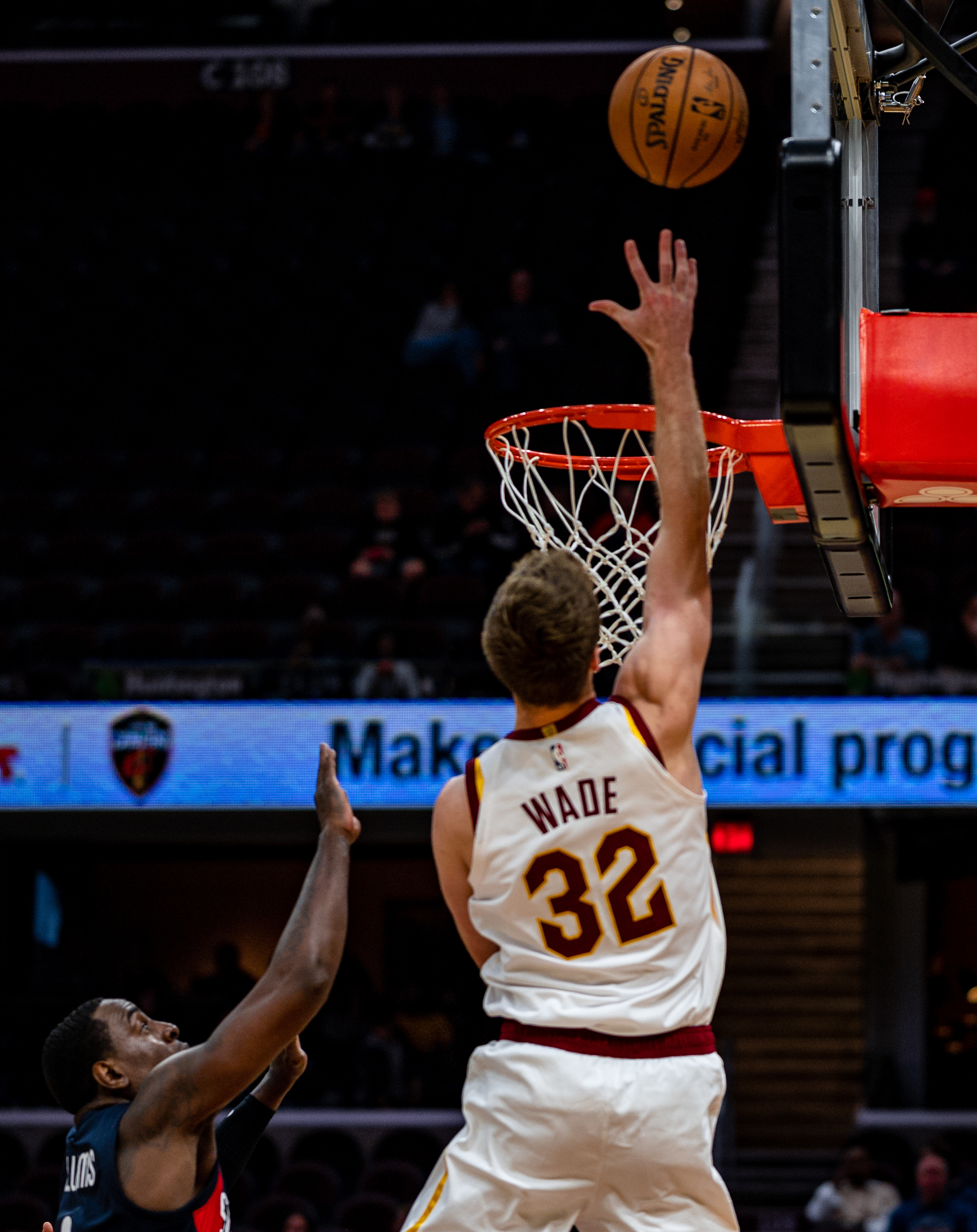
Wade attempts a shot in an October 2019 exhibition game.

On July 9, 2019, Wade signed a two-way contract with the Cleveland Cavaliers after going undrafted in the 2019 NBA draft. On November 18, Wade made his NBA debut against the New York Knicks, he went scoreless but logged one steal in eight minutes of action. Wade only played 12 games with the Cavaliers during his rookie season, averaging 1.7 points and 1.6 rebounds in six minutes of play. He spent most of the season with the Cavaliers' G League affiliate, the Canton Charge. In the G League, Wade started in 29 of 30 games, averaging 14.2 points, 7.6 rebounds, 2.3 assists and 1.4 blocks in 31.1 minutes while shooting 46.1% from the field and 39.9% from three-point range.

==== 2020–21 season ====
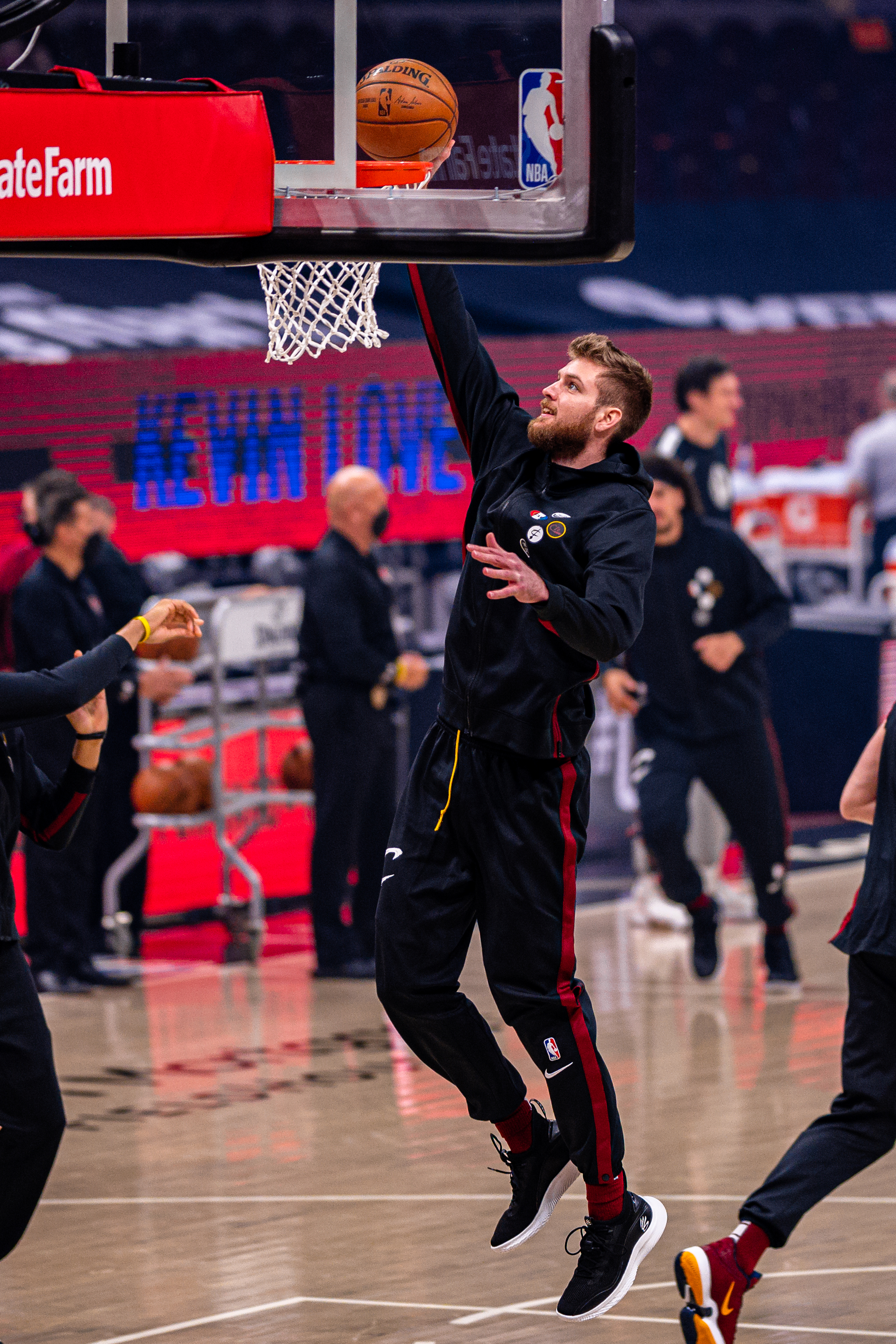
Wade during warm-ups in a May 2021 game

On July 2, 2020, Wade signed a multi-year deal with the Cavaliers.

On February 23, 2021, Wade made his first NBA career start, logging five points, two rebounds and two assists across 20 minutes in a 112–111 win over the Atlanta Hawks. Four days later, Wade scored six points and grabbed a career-high 12 rebounds in 27 minutes of action in a 112–109 victory against the Philadelphia 76ers. On March 3, Wade scored a then-career-high 17 points, knocking down five 3-pointers to go along with six rebounds, two assists and one steal across 31 minutes of play in a 114–111 loss to the Indiana Pacers. On April 11, Wade scored a career-high 21 points on 8-of-12 field goal shooting and 5 of 8 from three, in addition to six rebounds, two assists and a game-high three steals in 31 minutes of action in a 116–109 loss to the New Orleans Pelicans. On May 10, Wade logged his first career double-double with 19 points and a career-high-tying 12 rebounds in a 111–102 loss to the Indiana Pacers.

==== 2021–22 season ====
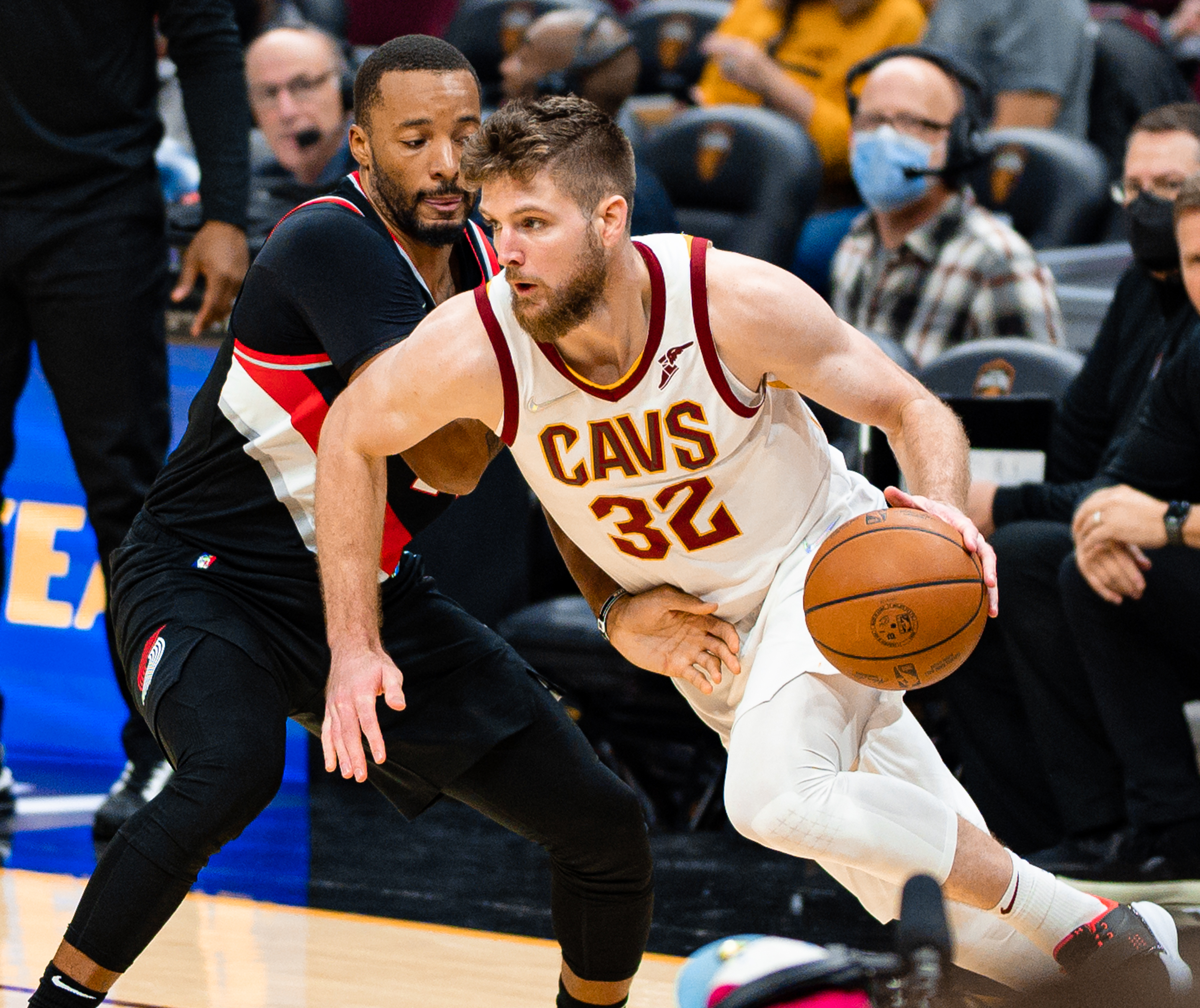
Wade driving towards the basket as Norman Powell guards him in November 2021

After Lauri Markkanen entered the NBA's COVID-19 health and safety protocols, Wade became the starter at the small forward position. On November 18, 2021, Wade logged 17 points on 7-of-13 shooting from the field and 3 of 6 from three, along with nine rebounds and a career-high five assists across a career-high 40 minutes of play in a 104–89 loss to the Golden State Warriors. On December 15, Wade posted his second career double-double with 16 points and 10 rebounds in a 124–89 win over the Houston Rockets. With Markkanen being sidelined due to a sprained ankle he sustained in a game against the Oklahoma City Thunder on January 22, 2022, Wade returned to the starting lineup. On March 28, he was ruled out for the remainder of the season after undergoing surgery on a torn meniscus in his right knee which he sustained on March 12 in a game in Chicago.

==== 2022–23 season ====
On June 22, 2022, the Cavaliers announced they exercised their fourth-year team option on Wade, keeping him with the team for another season. On September 26, Wade signed a three-year, $18.5 million contract extension with the team. On October 30, 2022, Wade scored a career high of 22 points shooting 6 of 8 from three versus the New York Knicks. That night, Wade, Kevin Love and Donovan Mitchell set the NBA record for most three-pointers made by three different teammates in a single game, scoring a total of 22 threes.

==== 2023–24 season ====
On March 5, 2024, Wade scored a career-high 23 points, with 20 of them coming in the fourth quarter, spearheading a 22-point comeback win over the Boston Celtics—the largest fourth-quarter comeback in Cavaliers franchise history.

==== 2024–25 season ====
During the 2024-25 NBA season, Wade appeared in 59 games (30 starts) for the Cavaliers, averaging 5.4 points, 4.2 rebounds and 1.3 assists.

==== 2025–26 season ====
During the 2025–26 NBA season, Wade appeared in 59 games (38 starts) for the Cavaliers, averaging 5.8 points, 4.2 rebounds and 1.5 assists.

=== Philadelphia 76ers (2026–present) ===
On July 6, 2026, Wade signed a four–year, $39 million contract with the Philadelphia 76ers.

== Career statistics ==
Legend
GP	Games played	GS	Games started	MPG	Minutes per game
FG%	Field goal percentage	3P%	3-point field goal percentage	FT%	Free throw percentage
RPG	Rebounds per game	APG	Assists per game	SPG	Steals per game
BPG	Blocks per game	PPG	Points per game	**Bold**	Career high

=== NBA ===
==== Regular season ====
Year	Team	GP	GS	MPG	FG%	3P%	FT%	RPG	APG	SPG	BPG	PPG
2019–20	Cleveland	12	0	6.0	**.692**	**.500**	.000	1.6	.2	.2	.3	1.7
2020–21	Cleveland	**63**	19	19.2	.431	.366	**.769**	3.4	1.2	.6	.3	**6.0**
2021–22	Cleveland	51	28	19.2	.456	.359	.667	2.9	1.0	.6	.1	5.3
2022–23	Cleveland	44	13	20.3	.412	.354	.652	3.4	.8	.6	**.5**	4.7
2023–24	Cleveland	54	32	20.5	.414	.391	**.769**	4.0	.8	**.7**	**.5**	5.4
2024–25	Cleveland	59	30	21.2	.413	.360	.533	**4.2**	1.3	**.7**	.3	5.4
2025–26	Cleveland	59	**38**	**22.3**	.439	.362	.711	**4.2**	**1.5**	**.7**	.4	5.8
Career		342	160	20.0	.430	.367	.684	3.6	1.1	.6	.4	5.3

==== Playoffs ====
Year	Team	GP	GS	MPG	FG%	3P%	FT%	RPG	APG	SPG	BPG	PPG
2023	Cleveland	2	0	5.6	.000	.000	1.000	1.5	.0	.0	.0	1.0
2024	Cleveland	3	1	21.0	.308	.300	—	2.0	**1.7**	.3	**.7**	3.7
2025	Cleveland	9	1	15.8	.333	.214	—	**4.2**	.7	.3	.1	1.7
2026	Cleveland	**18**	**14**	**22.6**	**.462**	**.375**	.333	3.9	.8	**.7**	.1	**4.4**
Career		32	16	19.5	.412	.329	.600	3.7	.8	.5	.1	3.3

=== College ===
Year	Team	GP	GS	MPG	FG%	3P%	FT%	RPG	APG	SPG	BPG	PPG
2015–16	Kansas State	33	31	26.4	.434	.292	.656	5.1	1.1	.6	.5	9.9
2016–17	Kansas State	**35**	**35**	28.0	.496	.402	.663	4.5	1.8	.7	.7	9.3
2017–18	Kansas State	33	32	**32.8**	**.550**	**.440**	.752	**6.2**	2.7	**1.5**	**.8**	**16.2**
2018–19	Kansas State	25	25	30.4	.492	.418	**.789**	**6.2**	**2.8**	.8	.5	12.9
Career		126	123	29.3	.498	.386	.711	5.4	2.1	.9	.6	12.0

== Personal life ==
Wade graduated with a bachelor's degree in social science.
