= 2023–24 Orlando Magic season =

- Division champions
- Head coach: Jamahl Mosley
- General manager: Anthony Parker
- Owners: RDV Sports, Inc.
- Arena: Kia Center (Note: Formerly known as the Amway Center until December 20, 2023)

Results
- Record: 47–35 (.573)
- Place: Division: 1st (Southeast); Conference: 5th (Eastern)
- Playoff finish: First round (lost to Cavaliers 3–4)
- Stats at Basketball Reference

Local media
- Television: Bally Sports Florida
- Radio: 96.9 The Game

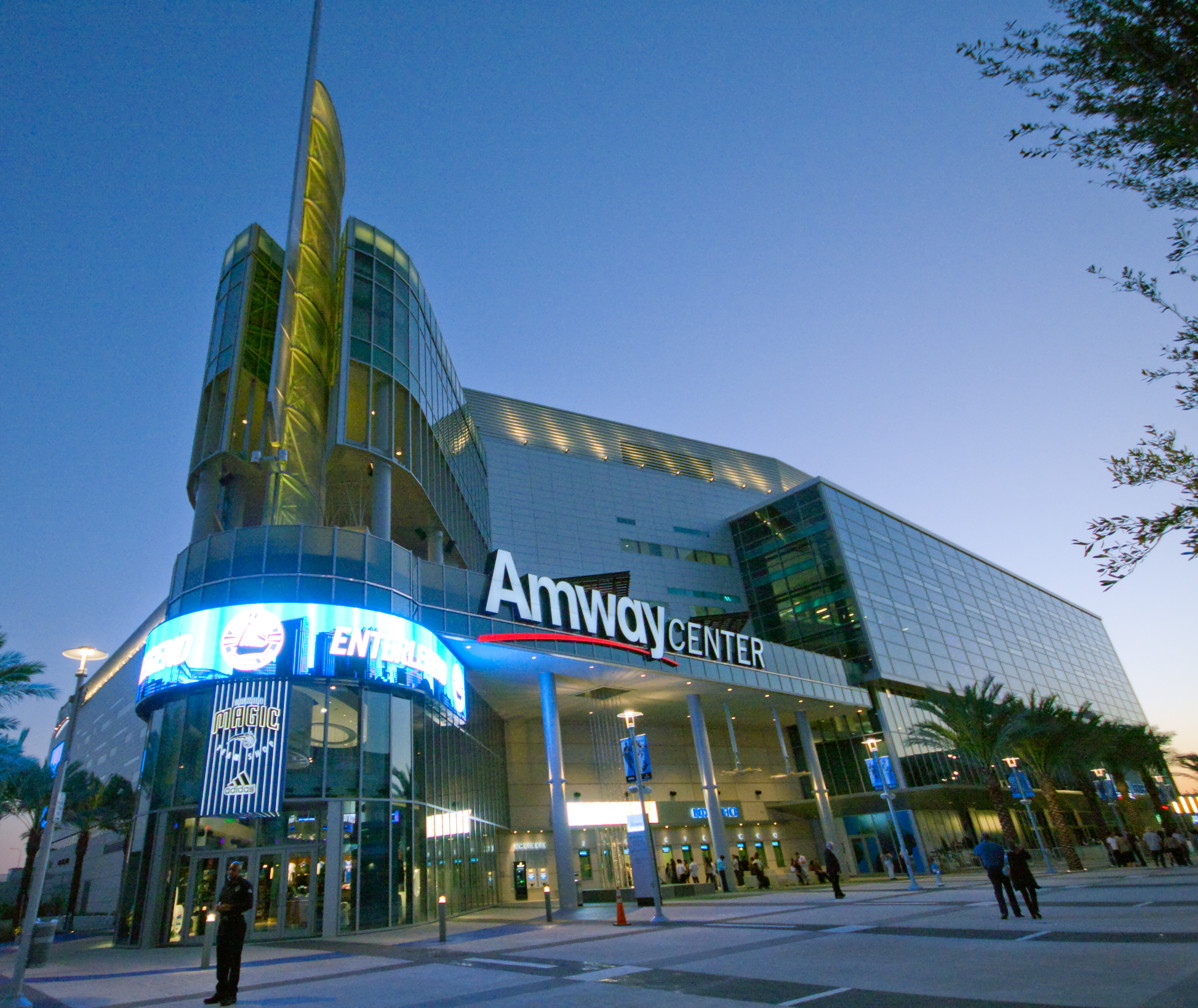
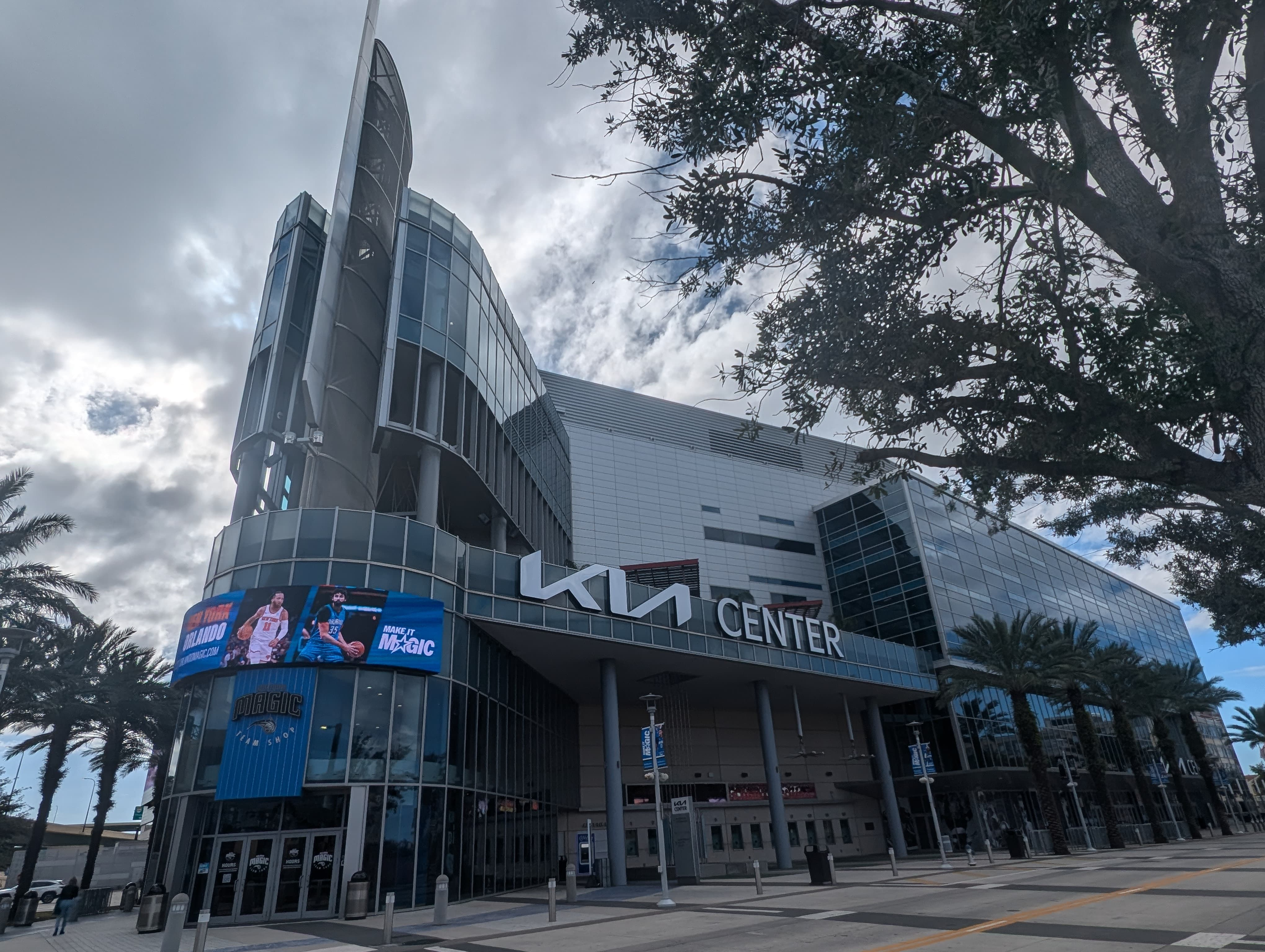
The Orlando Magic's home arena, the Amway Center, was renamed the Kia Center on December 20, 2023.

The 2023–24 Orlando Magic season was the 35th season for the franchise in the National Basketball Association. This is Orlando's third season with Jamahl Mosley as head coach. With a win over the Detroit Pistons on March 3, the Magic would collect their 35th win on the season and improve on their win total from their previous season.

The Magic started out their season hot by having a record of 13–5 in the month of November, but after struggles in the months of December and January, their record dropped to 25–23, but then they rebounded going 22–12 in their next three months, helping their record improve to 47–35, making them improve from their 34–48 record from last season by 13 wins, and giving them a winning season for the first time in five seasons. Their 47 wins was the most the Magic have had in a season since 2010–11.

Paolo Banchero was named to the 2024 NBA All-Star team making him the 9th player in Orlando Magic history to be given the honors, and the first since Nikola Vucevic in 2021.

On the last day of the NBA's regular season, the Magic would clinch their first playoff berth since the bubble-shortened 2019–20 season and would win the Southeast division for the first time since the 2018–19 season. The Magic faced the Cleveland Cavaliers in the first round, where they lost in seven games.

The Orlando Magic drew an average home attendance of 18,876 in 41 home games in the 2023-24 NBA season, the 12th highest in the league.

== Draft ==
Round	Pick	Player	Position	Nationality	College / Team
1	6	Anthony Black	SG/PG	United States	Arkansas (Fr.)
1	11	Jett Howard	SF	United States	Michigan (Fr.)
2	36	Andre Jackson Jr.	PG/SG	United States	UConn (Jr.)

The Magic held both the 6th and the 11th overall picks in the 2023 NBA draft, along with one second-round pick entering the draft. The 11th pick was conveyed to the team from the Chicago Bulls as part of the 2021 Nikola Vučević trade when it fell outside the Top 4.

== Roster ==
2023–24 Orlando Magic roster
Players

Pos.	No.	Player	Height	Weight	DOB	From
G	50	Cole Anthony	6 ft 2 in (1.88 m)	185 lb (84 kg)	2000-05-15	North Carolina
F	5	Paolo Banchero	6 ft 10 in (2.08 m)	250 lb (113 kg)	2002-11-12	Duke
C	35	Goga Bitadze	6 ft 11 in (2.11 m)	250 lb (113 kg)	1999-07-20	Georgia
G	0	Anthony Black	6 ft 7 in (2.01 m)	200 lb (91 kg)	2004-01-24	Arkansas
C	34	Wendell Jr. Carter	6 ft 10 in (2.08 m)	270 lb (122 kg)	1999-04-16	Duke
G	20	Markelle Fultz	6 ft 4 in (1.93 m)	209 lb (95 kg)	1998-05-29	Washington
G	14	Gary Harris	6 ft 4 in (1.93 m)	210 lb (95 kg)	1994-09-14	Michigan State
G	8	Kevon Harris (TW)	6 ft 5 in (1.96 m)	216 lb (98 kg)	1997-06-24	Stephen F. Austin
F	2	Caleb Houstan	6 ft 8 in (2.03 m)	205 lb (93 kg)	2003-01-09	Michigan
F	13	Jett Howard	6 ft 6 in (1.98 m)	215 lb (98 kg)	2003-09-14	Michigan
G/F	7	Joe Ingles	6 ft 9 in (2.06 m)	220 lb (100 kg)	1987-10-02	Australia
F	1	Jonathan Isaac	6 ft 10 in (2.08 m)	230 lb (104 kg)	1997-10-03	Florida State
F	3	Chuma Okeke	6 ft 7 in (2.01 m)	229 lb (104 kg)	1998-08-18	Auburn
G	12	Trevelin Queen (TW)	6 ft 5 in (1.96 m)	190 lb (86 kg)	1997-02-25	New Mexico State
F	25	Admiral Schofield (TW)	6 ft 5 in (1.96 m)	241 lb (109 kg)	1997-03-30	Tennessee
G	4	Jalen Suggs	6 ft 5 in (1.96 m)	205 lb (93 kg)	2001-06-03	Gonzaga
F	22	Franz Wagner	6 ft 10 in (2.08 m)	220 lb (100 kg)	2001-08-27	Michigan
F/C	21	Moritz Wagner	6 ft 11 in (2.11 m)	245 lb (111 kg)	1997-04-26	Michigan

Coaches
Head coach
- Jamahl Mosley
Assistant(s)
- Bret Brielmaier
- Lionel Chalmers
- Jesse Mermuys
- Dale Osbourne

Legend
- (DP) Unsigned draft pick
- (FA) Free agent
- (S) Suspended
- (GL) On assignment to G League affiliate
- (TW) Two-way affiliate player
- Injured

Roster
Updated: April 6, 2024

== Standings ==
=== Division ===
Southeast Division	W	L	PCT	GB	Home	Road	Div	GP
y – Orlando Magic	47	35	.573	–	29‍–‍12	18‍–‍23	9‍–‍7	82
x – Miami Heat	46	36	.561	1.0	22‍–‍19	24‍–‍17	13‍–‍3	82
pi – Atlanta Hawks	36	46	.439	11.0	21‍–‍20	15‍–‍26	8‍–‍8	82
Charlotte Hornets	21	61	.256	26.0	11‍–‍30	10‍–‍31	6‍–‍10	82
Washington Wizards	15	67	.183	32.0	7‍–‍34	8‍–‍33	4‍–‍12	82

=== Conference ===
Eastern Conference
#	Team	W	L	PCT	GB	GP
1	z – Boston Celtics *	64	18	.780	–	82
2	x – New York Knicks	50	32	.610	14.0	82
3	y – Milwaukee Bucks *	49	33	.598	15.0	82
4	x – Cleveland Cavaliers	48	34	.585	16.0	82
5	y – Orlando Magic *	47	35	.573	17.0	82
6	x – Indiana Pacers	47	35	.573	17.0	82
7	x – Philadelphia 76ers	47	35	.573	17.0	82
8	x – Miami Heat	46	36	.561	18.0	82
9	pi – Chicago Bulls	39	43	.476	25.0	82
10	pi – Atlanta Hawks	36	46	.439	28.0	82
11	Brooklyn Nets	32	50	.390	32.0	82
12	Toronto Raptors	25	57	.305	39.0	82
13	Charlotte Hornets	21	61	.256	43.0	82
14	Washington Wizards	15	67	.183	49.0	82
15	Detroit Pistons	14	68	.171	50.0	82

== Game log ==
=== Preseason ===
2023 preseason game log
Total: 3–1 (Home: 1–1; Road: 2–0)
Preseason: 3–1 (home: 1–1; road: 2–0)

Game	Date	Team	Score	High points	High rebounds	High assists	Location Attendance	Record
1	October 10	@ New Orleans	W 122–105	Wendell Carter Jr. (18)	Paolo Banchero (6)	Markelle Fultz (5)	Smoothie King Center; 16,058	1–0
2	October 12	@ Cleveland	W 108–105	Franz Wagner (18)	Wendell Carter Jr. (6)	Paolo Banchero (6)	Rocket Mortgage FieldHouse; 9,265	2–0
3	October 17	New Orleans	L 92–104	Franz Wagner (19)	Wendell Carter Jr. (6)	Markelle Fultz (6)	Amway Center; 17,622	2–1
4	October 20	Flamengo	W 109–76	Trevelin Queen (24)	Admiral Schofield (9)	Anthony Black (5)	Amway Center; 16,624	3–1

2023–24 preseason schedule

=== Regular season ===
2023–24 game log
Total: 47–35 (Home: 29–12; Road: 18–23)
October: 2–2 (home: 1–0; road: 1–2)

Game	Date	Team	Score	High points	High rebounds	High assists	Location Attendance	Record
1	October 25	Houston	W 116–86	Cole Anthony (20)	Anthony, Carter Jr. (8)	Banchero, Ingles (5)	Amway Center; 18,846	1–0
2	October 27	@ Portland	W 102–97	Franz Wagner (23)	Carter Jr., M. Wagner (9)	Markelle Fultz (6)	Moda Center; 19,464	2–0
3	October 30	@ L.A. Lakers	L 103–106	Gary Harris (17)	Carter Jr., Suggs, F. Wagner (8)	Markelle Fultz (8)	Crypto.com Arena; 18,997	2–1
4	October 31	@ L.A. Clippers	L 102–118	Paolo Banchero (15)	Carter Jr., F. Wagner (8)	Paolo Banchero (4)	Crypto.com Arena; 14,014	2–2

November: 11–3 (home: 7–2; road: 4–1)

Game	Date	Team	Score	High points	High rebounds	High assists	Location Attendance	Record
5	November 2	@ Utah	W 115–113	Paolo Banchero (30)	Wendell Carter Jr. (10)	Cole Anthony (7)	Delta Center; 18,206	3–2
6	November 4	L.A. Lakers	W 120–101	Franz Wagner (26)	Goga Bitadze (10)	Paolo Banchero (10)	Amway Center; 18,846	4–2
7	November 6	Dallas	L 102–117	Paolo Banchero (22)	Goga Bitadze (6)	Jalen Suggs (7)	Amway Center; 19,409	4–3
8	November 9	Atlanta	L 119–120	Jalen Suggs (21)	Paolo Banchero (8)	Joe Ingles (5)	Mexico City Arena; 19,986	4–4
9	November 11	Milwaukee	W 112–97	Paolo Banchero (26)	Paolo Banchero (12)	Banchero, Ingles (5)	Amway Center; 19,354	5–4
10	November 14	@ Brooklyn	L 104–124	Franz Wagner (21)	Franz Wagner (8)	Franz Wagner (5)	Barclays Center; 17,361	5–5
11	November 15	@ Chicago	W 96–94	Paolo Banchero (17)	Goga Bitadze (11)	Jalen Suggs (5)	United Center; 19,092	6–5
12	November 17	@ Chicago	W 103–97	Franz Wagner (21)	Jonathan Isaac (9)	Cole Anthony (7)	United Center; 20,235	7–5
13	November 19	@ Indiana	W 128–116	Paolo Banchero (24)	Goga Bitadze (8)	Joe Ingles (6)	Gainbridge Fieldhouse; 17,276	8–5
14	November 21	Toronto	W 126–107	Paolo Banchero (25)	Goga Bitadze (7)	Cole Anthony (10)	Amway Center; 18,846	9–5
15	November 22	Denver	W 124–119	Franz Wagner (27)	Goga Bitadze (12)	Joe Ingles (7)	Amway Center; 18,237	10–5
16	November 24	Boston	W 113–96	Moritz Wagner (27)	Franz Wagner (8)	Anthony, F. Wagner (6)	Amway Center; 18,846	11–5
17	November 26	Charlotte	W 130–117	Anthony, F. Wagner (30)	Anthony, Banchero, Bitadze, F. Wagner, M. Wagner (7)	Paolo Banchero (8)	Amway Center; 18,846	12–5
18	November 29	Washington	W 139–120	Franz Wagner (31)	Goga Bitadze (7)	Joe Ingles (6)	Amway Center; 17,109	13–5

December: 6–8 (home: 4–2; road: 2–6)

Game	Date	Team	Score	High points	High rebounds	High assists	Location Attendance	Record
19	December 1	Washington	W 130–125	Franz Wagner (31)	Paolo Banchero (13)	Franz Wagner (8)	Amway Center; 18,846	14–5
20	December 2	@ Brooklyn	L 101–129	Anthony, F. Wagner (20)	Paolo Banchero (10)	Paolo Banchero (8)	Barclays Center; 17,966	14–6
21	December 6	@ Cleveland	L 111–121	Paolo Banchero (42)	Cole Anthony (7)	Franz Wagner (9)	Rocket Mortgage FieldHouse; 19,432	14–7
22	December 8	Detroit	W 123–91	Franz Wagner (27)	Goga Bitadze (8)	Cole Anthony (6)	Amway Center; 18,655	15–7
23	December 11	Cleveland	W 104–94	Paolo Banchero (20)	Paolo Banchero (10)	Anthony, Banchero, F. Wagner (4)	Amway Center; 19,032	16–7
24	December 15	@ Boston	L 111–128	Jalen Suggs (19)	Goga Bitadze (11)	Banchero, F. Wagner (5)	TD Garden; 19,156	16–8
25	December 17	@ Boston	L 97–114	Paolo Banchero (36)	Paolo Banchero (10)	Franz Wagner (6)	TD Garden; 19,156	16–9
26	December 20	Miami	L 106–115	Cole Anthony (20)	Paolo Banchero (8)	Paolo Banchero (8)	Kia Center; 19,129	16–10
27	December 21	@ Milwaukee	L 114–118	Franz Wagner (29)	Cole Anthony (11)	Anthony, F. Wagner (6)	Fiserv Forum; 17,928	16–11
28	December 23	@ Indiana	W 117–111	Paolo Banchero (34)	Wendell Carter Jr. (8)	Banchero, Carter Jr. (4)	Gainbridge Fieldhouse; 17,274	17–11
29	December 26	@ Washington	W 127–119	Franz Wagner (28)	Franz Wagner (8)	Franz Wagner (9)	Capital One Arena; 16,293	18–11
30	December 27	Philadelphia	L 92–112	Franz Wagner (24)	Paolo Banchero (9)	Banchero, Black (4)	Kia Center; 19,179	18–12
31	December 29	New York	W 117–108	Franz Wagner (32)	Moritz Wagner (11)	Jalen Suggs (6)	Kia Center; 19,587	19–12
32	December 31	@ Phoenix	L 107–112	Paolo Banchero (28)	Paolo Banchero (9)	Paolo Banchero (7)	Footprint Center; 17,071	19–13

January: 6–10 (home: 3–3; road: 3–7)

Game	Date	Team	Score	High points	High rebounds	High assists	Location Attendance	Record
33	January 2	@ Golden State	L 115–121	Paolo Banchero (27)	Paolo Banchero (12)	Paolo Banchero (6)	Chase Center; 18,064	19–14
34	January 3	@ Sacramento	L 135–138 (2OT)	Paolo Banchero (43)	Okeke, Carter Jr. (7)	Trevelin Queen (6)	Golden 1 Center; 17,832	19–15
35	January 5	@ Denver	W 122–120	Paolo Banchero (32)	Moritz Wagner (11)	Paolo Banchero (11)	Ball Arena; 19,659	20–15
36	January 7	Atlanta	W 117–110 (OT)	Paolo Banchero (35)	Goga Bitadze (14)	Cole Anthony (5)	Kia Center; 19,349	21–15
37	January 9	Minnesota	L 92–113	Moritz Wagner (21)	Chuma Okeke (10)	Anthony Black (4)	Kia Center; 19,223	21–16
38	January 12	@ Miami	L 96–99	Paolo Banchero (25)	Goga Bitadze (9)	Banchero, Ingles (6)	Kaseya Center; 19,650	21–17
39	January 13	@ Oklahoma City	L 100–112	Paolo Banchero (20)	Banchero, Bitadze (9)	Paolo Banchero (8)	Paycom Center; 18,203	21–18
40	January 15	@ New York	W 98–94	Paolo Banchero (20)	Goga Bitadze (11)	Markelle Fultz (7)	Madison Square Garden; 19,812	22–18
41	January 17	@ Atlanta	L 104–106	Paolo Banchero (26)	Goga Bitadze (10)	Paolo Banchero (4)	State Farm Arena; 14,541	22–19
42	January 19	Philadelphia	L 109–124	Wendell Carter Jr. (25)	Wendell Carter Jr. (11)	Paolo Banchero (6)	Kia Center; 19,063	22–20
43	January 21	Miami	W 105–87	Paolo Banchero (20)	Paolo Banchero (10)	Franz Wagner (5)	Kia Center; 18,102	23–20
44	January 22	Cleveland	L 99–126	Paolo Banchero (18)	Wendell Carter Jr. (9)	Paolo Banchero (6)	Kia Center; 19,301	23–21
45	January 26	@ Memphis	L 106–107	Paolo Banchero (27)	Wendell Carter Jr. (9)	Paolo Banchero (6)	FedExForum; 16,823	23–22
46	January 28	Phoenix	W 113–98	Paolo Banchero (26)	Moritz Wagner (12)	Banchero, F. Wagner (7)	Kia Center; 18,823	24–22
47	January 29	@ Dallas	L 129–131	Paolo Banchero (36)	Paolo Banchero (9)	Cole Anthony (9)	American Airlines Center; 20,020	24–23
48	January 31	@ San Antonio	W 108–98	Paolo Banchero (25)	Paolo Banchero (9)	Paolo Banchero (7)	Frost Bank Center; 17,081	25–23

February: 9–3 (home: 5–1; road: 4–2)

Game	Date	Team	Score	High points	High rebounds	High assists	Location Attendance	Record
49	February 2	@ Minnesota	W 108–106	Paolo Banchero (23)	Wendell Carter Jr. (12)	Paolo Banchero (6)	Target Center; 18,024	26–23
50	February 4	@ Detroit	W 111–99	Franz Wagner (38)	Banchero, Isaac (6)	Paolo Banchero (7)	Little Caesars Arena; 17,982	27–23
51	February 6	@ Miami	L 95–121	Paolo Banchero (23)	Paolo Banchero (9)	Paolo Banchero (7)	Kaseya Center; 19,600	27–24
52	February 8	San Antonio	W 127–111	Franz Wagner (34)	Franz Wagner (7)	Franz Wagner (7)	Kia Center; 19,074	28–24
53	February 10	Chicago	W 114–108 (OT)	Franz Wagner (36)	Jonathan Isaac (12)	Paolo Banchero (8)	Kia Center; 19,459	29–24
54	February 13	Oklahoma City	L 113–127	Paolo Banchero (23)	Fultz, Suggs, F. Wagner (7)	Paolo Banchero (10)	Kia Center; 19,301	29–25
55	February 14	New York	W 118–100	Paolo Banchero (36)	Banchero, Carter Jr. (6)	Franz Wagner (6)	Kia Center; 19,259	30–25
All-Star Game
56	February 22	@ Cleveland	W 116–109	Moritz Wagner (22)	Isaac, M. Wagner (7)	Cole Anthony (6)	Rocket Mortgage FieldHouse; 19,432	31–25
57	February 24	@ Detroit	W 112–109	Paolo Banchero (15)	Wendell Carter Jr. (10)	Cole Anthony (7)	Little Caesars Arena; 19,388	32–25
58	February 25	@ Atlanta	L 92–109	Franz Wagner (19)	Wendell Carter Jr. (10)	Jalen Suggs (6)	State Farm Arena; 17,173	32–26
59	February 27	Brooklyn	W 108–81	Franz Wagner (21)	Wendell Carter Jr. (7)	Franz Wagner (5)	Kia Center; 17,708	33–26
60	February 29	Utah	W 115–107	Paolo Banchero (29)	Moritz Wagner (10)	Banchero, F. Wagner (6)	Kia Center; 17,848	34–26

March: 9–5 (home: 6–4; road: 3–1)

Game	Date	Team	Score	High points	High rebounds	High assists	Location Attendance	Record
61	March 3	Detroit	W 113–91	Paolo Banchero (29)	Banchero, Carter Jr., F. Wagner (8)	Paolo Banchero (5)	Kia Center; 19,459	35–26
62	March 5	@ Charlotte	W 101–89	Paolo Banchero (22)	Wendell Carter Jr. (9)	Joe Ingles (8)	Spectrum Center; 15,928	36–26
63	March 6	@ Washington	W 119–109	Franz Wagner (28)	Goga Bitadze (8)	Paolo Banchero (10)	Capital One Arena; 16,018	37–26
64	March 8	@ New York	L 74–98	Paolo Banchero (23)	Banchero, Carter Jr. (9)	Cole Anthony (5)	Madison Square Garden; 19,812	37–27
65	March 10	Indiana	L 97–111	Paolo Banchero (19)	Wendell Carter Jr. (15)	Paolo Banchero (5)	Kia Center; 19,481	37–28
66	March 13	Brooklyn	W 114–106	Paolo Banchero (21)	Carter Jr., Fultz (8)	Paolo Banchero (9)	Kia Center; 18,846	38–28
67	March 15	@ Toronto	W 113–103	Franz Wagner (19)	Paolo Banchero (9)	Paolo Banchero (8)	Scotiabank Arena; 19,800	39–28
68	March 17	Toronto	W 111–97	Paolo Banchero (29)	Franz Wagner (9)	Paolo Banchero (5)	Kia Center; 18,846	40–28
69	March 19	Charlotte	W 112–92	Cole Anthony (21)	Wendell Carter Jr. (8)	Jalen Suggs (6)	Kia Center; 18,846	41–28
70	March 21	New Orleans	W 121–106	Jalen Suggs (22)	Paolo Banchero (10)	Paolo Banchero (11)	Kia Center; 17,094	42–28
71	March 23	Sacramento	L 107–109	Jonathan Isaac (25)	Wendell Carter Jr. (11)	Cole Anthony (6)	Kia Center; 18,307	42–29
72	March 27	Golden State	L 93–101	Cole Anthony (26)	Paolo Banchero (8)	Moritz Wagner (7)	Kia Center; 19,210	42–30
73	March 29	L.A. Clippers	L 97–100	Paolo Banchero (23)	Moritz Wagner (9)	Jalen Suggs (5)	Kia Center; 19,452	42–31
74	March 30	Memphis	W 118–88	Anthony, Carter Jr., Suggs (15)	Wendell Carter Jr. (13)	Paolo Banchero (7)	Kia Center; 18,009	43–31

April: 4–4 (home: 3–0; road: 1–4)

Game	Date	Team	Score	High points	High rebounds	High assists	Location Attendance	Record
75	April 1	Portland	W 104–103	Franz Wagner (20)	Wendell Carter Jr. (13)	Jalen Suggs (7)	Kia Center; 19,004	44–31
76	April 3	@ New Orleans	W 117–108	Paolo Banchero (32)	Wendell Carter Jr. (11)	Cole Anthony (6)	Smoothie King Center; 16,427	45–31
77	April 5	@ Charlotte	L 115–124	Paolo Banchero (32)	Paolo Banchero (8)	Paolo Banchero (8)	Spectrum Center; 16,374	45–32
78	April 7	Chicago	W 113–98	Paolo Banchero (24)	Wendell Carter Jr. (8)	Banchero, Ingles, Suggs (5)	Kia Center; 19,276	46–32
79	April 9	@ Houston	L 106–118	Banchero, Suggs (21)	Jonathan Isaac (8)	Paolo Banchero (6)	Toyota Center; 18,055	46–33
80	April 10	@ Milwaukee	L 99–117	Cole Anthony (23)	Paolo Banchero (6)	Paolo Banchero (6)	Fiserv Forum; 17,563	46–34
81	April 12	@ Philadelphia	L 113–125	Franz Wagner (24)	Paolo Banchero (15)	Paolo Banchero (7)	Wells Fargo Center; 20,149	46–35
82	April 14	Milwaukee	W 113–88	Paolo Banchero (26)	Paolo Banchero (11)	Paolo Banchero (7)	Kia Center; 18,846	47–35

2023–24 season schedule

=== Playoffs ===
2024 playoff game log
Total: 3–4 (home: 3–0; road: 0–4)
First Round: 3–4 (home: 3–0; road: 0–4)

Game	Date	Team	Score	High points	High rebounds	High assists	Location Attendance	Series
1	April 20	@ Cleveland	L 83–97	Paolo Banchero (24)	Banchero, F. Wagner (7)	Paolo Banchero (5)	Rocket Mortgage FieldHouse; 19,432	0–1
2	April 22	@ Cleveland	L 86–96	Paolo Banchero (21)	Franz Wagner (7)	Jalen Suggs (5)	Rocket Mortgage FieldHouse; 19,432	0–2
3	April 25	Cleveland	W 121–83	Paolo Banchero (31)	Paolo Banchero (14)	Franz Wagner (8)	Kia Center; 18,846	1–2
4	April 27	Cleveland	W 112–89	Franz Wagner (34)	Franz Wagner (13)	Paolo Banchero (5)	Kia Center; 18,933	2–2
5	April 30	@ Cleveland	L 103–104	Paolo Banchero (39)	Wendell Carter Jr. (11)	Franz Wagner (6)	Rocket Mortgage FieldHouse; 19,432	2–3
6	May 3	Cleveland	W 103–96	Paolo Banchero (27)	Carter Jr., Isaac (9)	Banchero, Suggs, Fultz (4)	Kia Center; 19,193	3–3
7	May 5	@ Cleveland	L 94–106	Paolo Banchero (38)	Paolo Banchero (16)	Franz Wagner (6)	Rocket Mortgage FieldHouse; 19,432	3–4

2024 playoff schedule

=== In-Season Tournament ===
This was the first regular season where all the NBA teams competed in an in-season tournament due to the implementation of the 2023 NBA In-Season Tournament. During the in-season tournament period, the Magic competed in Group C of the Eastern Conference, which included the Boston Celtics, Brooklyn Nets, Toronto Raptors, and Chicago Bulls.

==== East group C ====
Pos	Team	Pld	W	L	PF	PA	PD	Qualification	BOS	ORL	BKN	TOR	CHI
1	Boston Celtics	4	3 (Note: Tied on head-to-head results. Overall point difference is used as the tiebreaker.)	1	449	422	+27	Advance to knockout stage	—	96–113	121–107	108–105	124–97
2	Orlando Magic	4	3	1	446	424	+22		113–96	—	104–124	126–107	103–97
3	Brooklyn Nets	4	3	1	455	435	+20		107–121	124–104	—	115–103	109–107
4	Toronto Raptors	4	1	3	436	457	−21		105–108	107–126	103–115	—	121–108
5	Chicago Bulls	4	0	4	409	457	−48		97–124	97–103	107–109	108–121	—

Source: NBA
Rules for classification: Tiebreakers

== Player statistics ==
=== Regular season ===
Player	POS	GP	GS	MP	REB	AST	STL	BLK	PTS	MPG	RPG	APG	SPG	BPG	PPG
Cole Anthony	PG	81	0	1,817	311	236	64	37	937	22.4	3.8	2.9	.8	.5	11.6
Paolo Banchero	PF	80	80	2,799	554	431	71	47	1,804	35.0	6.9	5.4	.9	.6	22.6
Moritz Wagner	C	80	1	1,415	347	96	39	21	868	17.7	4.3	1.2	.5	.3	10.9
Jalen Suggs	SG	75	75	2,025	229	205	106	47	943	27.0	3.1	2.7	1.4	.6	12.6
Franz Wagner	SF	72	72	2,337	381	269	76	28	1,421	32.5	5.3	3.7	1.1	.4	19.7
Anthony Black	PG	69	33	1,164	139	91	35	21	316	16.9	2.0	1.3	.5	.3	4.6
Joe Ingles	SF	68	0	1,169	142	203	43	5	296	17.2	2.1	3.0	.6	.1	4.4
Goga Bitadze	C	62	33	957	286	79	32	72	311	15.4	4.6	1.3	.5	1.2	5.0
Caleb Houstan	SF	59	13	815	84	29	15	4	253	13.8	1.4	.5	.3	.1	4.3
Jonathan Isaac	PF	58	2	914	260	30	43	70	393	15.8	4.5	.5	.7	1.2	6.8
Wendell Carter Jr.	C	55	48	1,406	381	95	35	28	603	25.6	6.9	1.7	.6	.5	11.0
Gary Harris	SG	54	27	1,297	91	87	49	14	372	24.0	1.7	1.6	.9	.3	6.9
Chuma Okeke	SF	47	8	432	80	20	9	7	107	9.2	1.7	.4	.2	.1	2.3
Markelle Fultz	PG	43	18	910	138	120	42	15	335	21.2	3.2	2.8	1.0	.3	7.8
Admiral Schofield	PF	23	0	84	17	7	1	0	26	3.7	.7	.3	.0	.0	1.1
Jett Howard	SF	18	0	67	7	6	2	2	29	3.7	.4	.3	.1	.1	1.6
Trevelin Queen	SG	14	0	165	20	18	7	5	40	11.8	1.4	1.3	.5	.4	2.9
Kevon Harris	SG	2	0	6	2	1	0	0	4	3.0	1.0	.5	.0	.0	2.0

=== Playoffs ===
Player	POS	GP	GS	MP	REB	AST	STL	BLK	PTS	MPG	RPG	APG	SPG	BPG	PPG
Paolo Banchero	PF	7	7	262	60	28	8	4	189	37.4	8.6	4.0	1.1	.6	27.0
Franz Wagner	SF	7	7	259	48	31	5	9	132	37.0	6.9	4.4	.7	1.3	18.9
Jalen Suggs	SG	7	7	232	36	23	9	3	103	33.1	5.1	3.3	1.3	.4	14.7
Wendell Carter Jr.	C	7	5	185	44	9	5	4	53	26.4	6.3	1.3	.7	.6	7.6
Jonathan Isaac	PF	7	3	147	34	3	5	9	44	21.0	4.9	.4	.7	1.3	6.3
Markelle Fultz	PG	7	0	106	14	8	3	0	45	15.1	2.0	1.1	.4	.0	6.4
Moritz Wagner	C	7	0	105	31	2	6	3	44	15.0	4.4	.3	.9	.4	6.3
Cole Anthony	PG	7	0	103	15	9	4	1	36	14.7	2.1	1.3	.6	.1	5.1
Joe Ingles	SF	7	0	68	13	12	3	0	11	9.7	1.9	1.7	.4	.0	1.6
Gary Harris	SG	6	6	159	12	4	7	3	25	26.5	2.0	.7	1.2	.5	4.2
Caleb Houstan	SF	3	0	14	2	0	0	0	3	4.7	.7	.0	.0	.0	1.0
Anthony Black	PG	2	0	11	2	2	1	0	6	5.5	1.0	1.0	.5	.0	3.0
Chuma Okeke	SF	2	0	10	0	1	0	0	6	5.0	.0	.5	.0	.0	3.0
Jett Howard	SF	2	0	10	1	1	0	0	5	5.0	.5	.5	.0	.0	2.5
Goga Bitadze	C	2	0	10	3	2	0	0	0	5.0	1.5	1.0	.0	.0	.0

- ^{†} Denotes player spent time with another team in the season. Stats reflect time with the Magic only.

== Transactions ==
=== Trades ===
June 23, 2023	To Orlando Magic 2030 second-round pick Cash considerations	To Milwaukee Bucks Draft rights to Andre Jackson Jr. (No. 36)

=== Free agency ===
==== Subtractions ====
Date	Player	Reason left	New team	Ref.
July 4	Bol Bol	Waived	Phoenix Suns	
