= 2023–24 Utah Jazz season =

- Head coach: Will Hardy
- General manager: Justin Zanik
- Owner: Ryan Smith
- Arena: Delta Center

Results
- Record: 31–51 (.378)
- Place: Division: 4th (Northwest); Conference: 12th (Western)
- Playoff finish: Did not qualify
- Stats at Basketball Reference

Local media
- Television: KJZZ-TV; KUTV; Kiswe (Jazz+); Root Sports Northwest
- Radio: 1280; 97.5 The Zone

The 2023–24 Utah Jazz season was the 50th season for the franchise in the National Basketball Association (NBA) and their 45th season in Utah. This also became their first season where they would begin to air their games on KJZZ-TV and KUTV alongside the Kiswe owned streaming service called Jazz+ instead of working with AT&T SportsNet Rocky Mountain (later known as SportsNet Rocky Mountain before shutting down by the end of 2023). During their first season under this change, the Jazz would see a 39% increase in viewership by comparison to the previous season under AT&T SportsNet Rocky Mountain. They failed to improve upon their 37–45 record from the previous year, suffering a second consecutive losing record, at 31–51.

Utah's January 17, 2024 matchup against the Golden State Warriors was postponed due to the death of Dejan Milojević, an assistant coach to Golden State. The game was later made up on February 15, 2024. On March 27, 2024, the Jazz were eliminated from playoff contention for the second straight season following a loss to the San Antonio Spurs and wins by the Golden State Warriors (over the Orlando Magic) and Houston Rockets (over the Oklahoma City Thunder).

The Utah Jazz drew an average home attendance of 18,206 in 41 home games in the 2023-24 NBA season. The total attendance was 746,446.

== Draft ==
Round	Pick	Player	Position	Nationality	College
1	9	Taylor Hendricks	PF	United States	UCF
1	16	Keyonte George	SG	United States	Baylor
1	28	Brice Sensabaugh	SF	United States	Ohio State

The Jazz entered the draft with three first-round picks, two of which were acquired through trades. Their second-round pick had been traded away to the New York Knicks and was ultimately held by the Charlotte Hornets.

== Roster ==
2023–24 Utah Jazz roster
Players

Pos.	No.	Player	Height	Weight	DOB	From
F	21	Darius Bazley	6 ft 9 in (2.06 m)	216 lb (98 kg)	2000-06-12	Princeton HS (OH)
G	00	Jordan Clarkson	6 ft 3 in (1.91 m)	194 lb (88 kg)	1992-06-07	Missouri
F	20	John Collins	6 ft 9 in (2.06 m)	235 lb (107 kg)	1997-09-23	Wake Forest
G	11	Kris Dunn	6 ft 3 in (1.91 m)	205 lb (93 kg)	1994-03-18	Providence
G	3	Keyonte George	6 ft 4 in (1.93 m)	185 lb (84 kg)	2003-11-08	Baylor
F	0	Taylor Hendricks	6 ft 10 in (2.08 m)	215 lb (98 kg)	2003-11-22	Central Florida
G	5	Talen Horton-Tucker	6 ft 4 in (1.93 m)	234 lb (106 kg)	2000-11-25	Iowa State
G	33	Johnny Juzang (TW)	6 ft 5 in (1.96 m)	209 lb (95 kg)	2001-03-17	UCLA
C	24	Walker Kessler	7 ft 1 in (2.16 m)	245 lb (111 kg)	2001-07-26	Auburn
G	13	Kira Jr. Lewis	6 ft 1 in (1.85 m)	170 lb (77 kg)	2001-04-06	Alabama
F	34	Kenneth Jr. Lofton	6 ft 6 in (1.98 m)	275 lb (125 kg)	2002-08-14	Louisiana Tech
F	23	Lauri Markkanen	7 ft 0 in (2.13 m)	240 lb (109 kg)	1997-05-22	Arizona
F/C	25	Micah Potter (TW)	6 ft 10 in (2.08 m)	248 lb (112 kg)	1998-04-06	Wisconsin
G	17	Jason Preston (TW)	6 ft 3 in (1.91 m)	181 lb (82 kg)	1999-08-10	Ohio
F	19	Luka Šamanić	6 ft 10 in (2.08 m)	227 lb (103 kg)	2000-01-09	Croatia
F	8	Brice Sensabaugh	6 ft 6 in (1.98 m)	235 lb (107 kg)	2003-10-30	Ohio State
G	2	Collin Sexton	6 ft 3 in (1.91 m)	190 lb (86 kg)	1999-01-04	Alabama
C	77	Ömer Yurtseven	6 ft 11 in (2.11 m)	275 lb (125 kg)	1998-06-19	Georgetown

Coaches
Head coach
- Will Hardy
Assistant(s)
- Evan Bradds
- Chad Forcier
- Rick Higgins
- Chris Jones
- Scott Morrison
- Sean Sheldon
- Lamar Skeeter
- Jason Terry
- Mike Williams

Legend
- (DP) Unsigned draft pick
- (FA) Free agent
- (S) Suspended
- (GL) On assignment to G League affiliate
- (TW) Two-way affiliate player
- Injured

Roster
Updated: April 3, 2024

== Standings ==
=== Division ===
Northwest Division	W	L	PCT	GB	Home	Road	Div	GP
c – Oklahoma City Thunder	57	25	.695	–	33‍–‍8	24‍–‍17	12‍–‍4	82
x – Denver Nuggets	57	25	.695	–	33‍–‍8	24‍–‍17	10‍–‍6	82
x – Minnesota Timberwolves	56	26	.683	1.0	30‍–‍11	26‍–‍15	12‍–‍4	82
Utah Jazz	31	51	.378	26.0	21‍–‍20	10‍–‍31	5‍–‍11	82
Portland Trail Blazers	21	61	.256	36.0	11‍–‍30	10‍–‍31	1‍–‍15	82

=== Conference ===
Western Conference
#	Team	W	L	PCT	GB	GP
1	c – Oklahoma City Thunder *	57	25	.695	–	82
2	x – Denver Nuggets	57	25	.695	–	82
3	x – Minnesota Timberwolves	56	26	.683	1.0	82
4	y – Los Angeles Clippers *	51	31	.622	6.0	82
5	y – Dallas Mavericks *	50	32	.610	7.0	82
6	x – Phoenix Suns	49	33	.598	8.0	82
7	x – New Orleans Pelicans	49	33	.598	8.0	82
8	x – Los Angeles Lakers	47	35	.573	10.0	82
9	pi – Sacramento Kings	46	36	.561	11.0	82
10	pi – Golden State Warriors	46	36	.561	11.0	82
11	Houston Rockets	41	41	.500	16.0	82
12	Utah Jazz	31	51	.378	26.0	82
13	Memphis Grizzlies	27	55	.329	30.0	82
14	San Antonio Spurs	22	60	.268	35.0	82
15	Portland Trail Blazers	21	61	.256	36.0	82

== Game log ==
=== Preseason ===
2023 preseason game log
Total: 3–2 (Home: 2–0; Road: 1–2)
Preseason: 3–2 (home: 2–0; road: 1–2)

Game	Date	Team	Score	High points	High rebounds	High assists	Location Attendance	Record
1	October 8	@ L.A. Clippers	W 101–96	Kris Dunn (15)	Lauri Markkanen (8)	Dunn, George, Sexton (5)	Stan Sheriff Center; 10,263	1–0
2	October 10	@ L.A. Clippers	L 98–103	Talen Horton-Tucker (24)	Lauri Markkanen (8)	Talen Horton-Tucker (7)	Climate Pledge Arena; 18,100	1–1
3	October 14	Portland	W 138–133	Lauri Markkanen (26)	Lauri Markkanen (9)	Clarkson, Horton-Tucker, Sexton (6)	Delta Center; 14,746	2–1
4	October 16	New Zealand	W 114–94	Lauri Markkanen (15)	Lauri Markkanen (7)	Johnny Juzang (4)	Delta Center; 14,190	3–1
5	October 19	@ Sacramento	L 113–116	Talen Horton-Tucker (26)	Walker Kessler (15)	Talen Horton-Tucker (8)	Golden 1 Center; 15,726	3–2

2023–24 preseason schedule

=== Regular season ===
This became the first regular season where all the NBA teams competed in a mid-season tournament setting due to the implementation of the 2023 NBA In-Season Tournament.

2023–24 game log
Total: 31–51 (Home: 21–20; Road: 10–31)
October: 1–3 (home: 1–1; road: 0–2)

Game	Date	Team	Score	High points	High rebounds	High assists	Location Attendance	Record
1	October 25	Sacramento	L 114–130	Jordan Clarkson (24)	John Collins (11)	Jordan Clarkson (6)	Delta Center; 18,206	0–1
2	October 27	L.A. Clippers	W 120–118	Lauri Markkanen (35)	Collins, Markkanen (12)	Talen Horton-Tucker (8)	Delta Center; 18,206	1–1
3	October 28	@ Phoenix	L 104–126	Lauri Markkanen (19)	John Collins (10)	George, Sexton (6)	Footprint Center; 17,071	1–2
4	October 30	@ Denver	L 102–110	Lauri Markkanen (27)	Lauri Markkanen (14)	Talen Horton-Tucker (8)	Ball Arena; 19,671	1–3

November: 5–10 (home: 4–3; road: 1–7)

Game	Date	Team	Score	High points	High rebounds	High assists	Location Attendance	Record
5	November 1	Memphis	W 133–109	Collin Sexton (23)	Lauri Markkanen (11)	Talen Horton-Tucker (7)	Delta Center; 18,206	2–3
6	November 2	Orlando	L 113–115	Lauri Markkanen (22)	Collins, Kessler (10)	Talen Horton-Tucker (8)	Delta Center; 18,206	2–4
7	November 4	@ Minnesota	L 95–123	Lauri Markkanen (22)	Lauri Markkanen (8)	Talen Horton-Tucker (5)	Target Center; 18,024	2–5
8	November 6	@ Chicago	L 113–130	Lauri Markkanen (29)	Walker Kessler (15)	Kelly Olynyk (8)	United Center; 18,031	2–6
9	November 8	@ Indiana	L 118–134	Jordan Clarkson (33)	Collins, Markkanen (9)	Keyonte George (9)	Gainbridge Fieldhouse; 14,509	2–7
10	November 10	@ Memphis	W 127–121	Clarkson, Markkanen (26)	Kelly Olynyk (8)	Keyonte George (11)	FedExForum; 16,977	3–7
11	November 14	Portland	W 115–99	Jordan Clarkson (30)	Kelly Olynyk (12)	George, Sexton (7)	Delta Center; 18,206	4–7
12	November 17	Phoenix	L 128–131	Jordan Clarkson (37)	John Collins (14)	Kelly Olynyk (7)	Delta Center; 18,206	4–8
13	November 19	Phoenix	L 137–140 (2OT)	Lauri Markkanen (38)	Lauri Markkanen (17)	Keyonte George (11)	Delta Center; 18,206	4–9
14	November 21	@ L.A. Lakers	L 99–131	Ömer Yurtseven (18)	Lauri Markkanen (8)	Talen Horton-Tucker (7)	Crypto.com Arena; 18,997	4–10
15	November 22	@ Portland	L 105–121	Lauri Markkanen (24)	John Collins (11)	Keyonte George (7)	Moda Center; 17,819	4–11
16	November 25	New Orleans	W 105–100	Collin Sexton (16)	Walker Kessler (11)	Collin Sexton (6)	Delta Center; 18,206	5–11
17	November 27	New Orleans	W 114–112	Keyonte George (19)	Ömer Yurtseven (10)	Jordan Clarkson (10)	Delta Center; 18,206	6–11
18	November 29	@ Memphis	L 91–105	John Collins (17)	Walker Kessler (8)	Jordan Clarkson (5)	FedExForum; 15,327	6–12
19	November 30	@ Minnesota	L 90–101	Simone Fontecchio (16)	John Collins (12)	Simone Fontecchio (5)	Target Center; 18,024	6–13

December: 8–6 (home: 4–1; road: 4–5)

Game	Date	Team	Score	High points	High rebounds	High assists	Location Attendance	Record
20	December 2	Portland	W 118–113 (OT)	Collin Sexton (25)	Ömer Yurtseven (15)	Keyonte George (6)	Delta Center; 18,206	7–13
21	December 6	@ Dallas	L 97–147	Ochai Agbaji (21)	Ömer Yurtseven (9)	Keyonte George (11)	American Airlines Center; 19,877	7–14
22	December 8	L.A. Clippers	L 103–117	John Collins (20)	John Collins (13)	Clarkson, Horton-Tucker (5)	Delta Center; 18,206	7–15
23	December 11	@ Oklahoma City	L 120–134	Keyonte George (30)	Luka Šamanić (7)	Dunn, George (7)	Paycom Center; 16,631	7–16
24	December 13	New York	W 117–113	Collin Sexton (26)	Kelly Olynyk (10)	Kelly Olynyk (8)	Delta Center; 18,206	8–16
25	December 14	@ Portland	W 122–114	Collin Sexton (27)	Kessler, Olynyk (10)	Kelly Olynyk (7)	Moda Center; 17,842	9–16
26	December 16	@ Sacramento	L 104–125	Collin Sexton (28)	Lauri Markkanen (6)	Kelly Olynyk (13)	Golden 1 Center; 17,794	9–17
27	December 18	Brooklyn	W 125–108	Horton-Tucker, Sexton (27)	Walker Kessler (14)	Horton-Tucker, Sexton (6)	Delta Center; 18,206	10–17
28	December 20	@ Cleveland	L 116–124	Lauri Markkanen (26)	Lauri Markkanen (10)	Talen Horton-Tucker (11)	Rocket Mortgage FieldHouse; 19,432	10–18
29	December 21	@ Detroit	W 119–111	Kelly Olynyk (27)	Walker Kessler (10)	Kris Dunn (10)	Little Caesars Arena; 18,122	11–18
30	December 23	@ Toronto	W 126–119	Clarkson, Markkanen (30)	Lauri Markkanen (9)	Kris Dunn (13)	Scotiabank Arena; 19,420	12–18
31	December 26	@ San Antonio	W 130–118	Lauri Markkanen (31)	Lauri Markkanen (12)	Jordan Clarkson (8)	Frost Bank Center; 18,579	13–18
32	December 28	@ New Orleans	L 105–112	Collin Sexton (26)	John Collins (12)	Jordan Clarkson (6)	Smoothie King Center; 17,753	13–19
33	December 30	Miami	W 117–109	Collin Sexton (22)	Walker Kessler (8)	Kelly Olynyk (10)	Delta Center; 18,206	14–19

January: 10–6 (home: 6–1; road: 4–5)

Game	Date	Team	Score	High points	High rebounds	High assists	Location Attendance	Record
34	January 1	Dallas	W 127–90	Simone Fontecchio (24)	Clarkson, Kessler (10)	Jordan Clarkson (11)	Delta Center; 18,206	15–19
35	January 3	Detroit	W 154–148 (OT)	Jordan Clarkson (36)	Walker Kessler (8)	Collin Sexton (5)	Delta Center; 18,206	16–19
36	January 5	@ Boston	L 97–126	Lauri Markkanen (17)	John Collins (11)	Dunn, Markkanen (5)	TD Garden; 19,156	16–20
37	January 6	@ Philadelphia	W 120–109	Lauri Markkanen (33)	Lauri Markkanen (13)	Collin Sexton (10)	Wells Fargo Center; 20,278	17–20
38	January 8	@ Milwaukee	W 132–116	Clarkson, Markkanen (21)	Lauri Markkanen (14)	Kris Dunn (13)	Fiserv Forum; 17,341	18–20
39	January 10	Denver	W 124–111	Jordan Clarkson (27)	Lauri Markkanen (12)	Jordan Clarkson (9)	Delta Center; 18,206	19–20
40	January 12	Toronto	W 145–113	Lauri Markkanen (22)	Kelly Olynyk (10)	Keyonte George (6)	Delta Center; 18,206	20–20
41	January 13	L.A. Lakers	W 132–125	Lauri Markkanen (29)	John Collins (13)	Markkanen, Sexton (5)	Delta Center; 18,206	21–20
42	January 15	Indiana	W 132–105	Lauri Markkanen (32)	Lauri Markkanen (10)	Kris Dunn (6)	Delta Center; 18,206	22–20
–	January 17	Golden State	Postponed due to the death of GSW assistant coach Dejan Milojević; Makeup date February 15					
43	January 18	Oklahoma City	L 129–134	Collin Sexton (31)	Walker Kessler (11)	Collin Sexton (7)	Delta Center; 18,206	22–21
44	January 20	@ Houston	L 126–127 (OT)	Jordan Clarkson (33)	Jordan Clarkson (12)	Kris Dunn (7)	Toyota Center; 16,618	22–22
45	January 23	@ New Orleans	L 124–153	Collin Sexton (22)	John Collins (9)	Collin Sexton (7)	Smoothie King Center; 16,032	22–23
46	January 25	@ Washington	W 123–108	Lauri Markkanen (29)	John Collins (16)	Jordan Clarkson (8)	Capital One Arena; 14,027	23–23
47	January 27	@ Charlotte	W 134–122	Lauri Markkanen (33)	Lauri Markkanen (12)	Collin Sexton (13)	Spectrum Center; 17,633	24–23
48	January 29	@ Brooklyn	L 114–147	Keyonte George (21)	Lauri Markkanen (9)	Colin Sexton (7)	Barclays Center; 16,054	24–24
49	January 30	@ New York	L 103–118	Collin Sexton (22)	John Collins (11)	Collin Sexton (7)	Madison Square Garden; 19,133	24–25

February: 3–8 (home: 3–5; road: 0–3)

Game	Date	Team	Score	High points	High rebounds	High assists	Location Attendance	Record
50	February 1	Philadelphia	L 124–127	Lauri Markkanen (28)	Lauri Markkanen (10)	Jordan Clarkson (10)	Delta Center; 18,206	24–26
51	February 4	Milwaukee	W 123–108	Lauri Markkanen (21)	Collins, George (10)	Dunn, Olynyk (6)	Delta Center; 18,206	25–26
52	February 6	Oklahoma City	W 124–117	Lauri Markkanen (33)	Lauri Markkanen (11)	Kelly Olynyk (7)	Delta Center; 18,206	26–26
53	February 8	@ Phoenix	L 115–129	Lauri Markkanen (22)	John Collins (14)	Collin Sexton (8)	Footprint Center; 17,071	26–27
54	February 12	Golden State	L 107–129	Clarkson, Sexton (22)	Walker Kessler (9)	Collins, Sexton (5)	Delta Center; 18,206	26–28
55	February 14	L.A. Lakers	L 122–138	Collin Sexton (18)	John Collins (10)	Keyonte George (7)	Delta Center; 18,206	26–29
56	February 15	Golden State	L 137–140	Collin Sexton (35)	Lauri Markkanen (14)	Clarkson, Sexton (9)	Delta Center; 18,206	26–30
All-Star Game
57	February 22	Charlotte	L 107–115	Lauri Markkanen (21)	John Collins (18)	Lauri Markkanen (6)	Delta Center; 18,206	26–31
58	February 25	San Antonio	W 128–109	Lauri Markkanen (26)	John Collins (8)	Clarkson, Sexton (10)	Delta Center; 18,206	27–31
59	February 27	@ Atlanta	L 97–124	Collin Sexton (22)	Walker Kessler (12)	Jordan Clarkson (8)	State Farm Arena; 17,129	27–32
60	February 29	@ Orlando	L 107–115	Collins, Sexton, George (19)	John Collins (10)	Keyonte George (9)	Kia Center; 17,848	27–33

March: 2–13 (home: 2–7; road: 0–6)

Game	Date	Team	Score	High points	High rebounds	High assists	Location Attendance	Record
61	March 2	@ Miami	L 120–126	Keyonte George (31)	Taylor Hendricks (13)	Lauri Markkanen (6)	Kaseya Center; 19,858	27–34
62	March 4	Washington	W 127–115	Jordan Clarkson (38)	John Collins (15)	Sexton, Clarkson (7)	Delta Center; 18,206	28–34
63	March 6	Chicago	L 117–119	John Collins (25)	John Collins (13)	Collin Sexton (7)	Delta Center; 18,206	28–35
64	March 9	@ Denver	L 121–142	Keyonte George (29)	Walker Kessler (11)	Keyonte George (6)	Ball Arena; 19,632	28–36
65	March 12	Boston	L 107–123	Keyonte George (26)	Walker Kessler (8)	Keyonte George (6)	Delta Center; 18,206	28–37
66	March 15	Atlanta	W 124–122	Keyonte George (25)	John Collins (11)	Collin Sexton (6)	Delta Center	29–37
67	March 16	Minnesota	L 100–119	Collin Sexton (22)	Hendricks, Kessler (10)	Collin Sexton (10)	Delta Center; 18,206	29–38
68	March 18	Minnesota	L 104–114	Collin Sexton (24)	Walker Kessler (14)	Keyonte George (8)	Delta Center; 18,206	29–39
69	March 20	@ Oklahoma City	L 107–119	Collin Sexton (25)	Walker Kessler (8)	Collin Sexton (7)	Paycom Center; 18,203	29–40
70	March 21	@ Dallas	L 97–113	Lauri Markkanen (21)	Walker Kessler (9)	Dunn, George, Sensabaugh, Sexton (5)	American Airlines Center; 20,277	29–41
71	March 23	@ Houston	L 119–147	John Collins (25)	Walker Kessler (9)	Collin Sexton (8)	Toyota Center; 18,055	29–42
72	March 25	Dallas	L 105–115	Lauri Markkanen (34)	John Collins (11)	Jordan Clarkson (8)	Delta Center; 18,206	29–43
73	March 27	San Antonio	L 111–118	Collin Sexton (26)	Taylor Hendricks (8)	Collin Sexton (9)	Delta Center; 18,206	29–44
74	March 29	Houston	L 100–101	John Collins (30)	John Collins (11)	Keyonte George (6)	Delta Center; 18,206	29–45
75	March 31	@ Sacramento	L 106–127	Sensabaugh, Sexton (22)	Walker Kessler (8)	Kris Dunn (7)	Golden 1 Center; 18,332	29–46

April: 2–5 (home: 1–2; road: 1–3)

Game	Date	Team	Score	High points	High rebounds	High assists	Location Attendance	Record
76	April 2	Cleveland	L 113–129	Brice Sensabaugh (22)	Brice Sensabaugh (7)	Collin Sexton (7)	Delta Center; 18,206	29–47
77	April 5	@ L.A. Clippers	L 102–131	Talen Horton-Tucker (17)	Juzang, Yurtseven (7)	Jason Preston (6)	Crypto.com Arena; 19,370	29–48
78	April 7	@ Golden State	L 110–118	Johnny Juzang (27)	Ömer Yurtseven (7)	Collin Sexton (7)	Chase Center; 18,064	29–49
79	April 9	Denver	L 95–111	Talen Horton-Tucker (24)	Ömer Yurtseven (7)	Keyonte George (5)	Delta Center; 18,206	29–50
80	April 11	Houston	W 124–121	Luka Šamanić (22)	Kenneth Lofton Jr. (9)	George, Horton-Tucker, Lofton Jr. (5)	Delta Center; 18,206	30–50
81	April 12	@ L.A. Clippers	W 110–109	Kenneth Lofton Jr. (27)	Ömer Yurtseven (10)	Kenneth Lofton Jr. (8)	Crypto.com Arena; 19,370	31–50
82	April 14	@ Golden State	L 116–123	Keyonte George (21)	Ömer Yurtseven (18)	Kenneth Lofton Jr. (6)	Chase Center; 18,064	31–51

2023–24 season schedule

=== In-Season Tournament ===
This was the first regular season where all the NBA teams competed in a mid-season tournament setting due to the implementation of the 2023 NBA In-Season Tournament. During the in-season tournament period, the Jazz competed in Group A of the Western Conference, which included the Memphis Grizzlies, the Phoenix Suns, the Los Angeles Lakers, and the Portland Trail Blazers. While the Jazz got off to a promising start as underdog contenders for Group A following their wins over the Grizzlies and Trail Blazers, a close loss to the Suns and a blowout loss to the Lakers mathematically eliminated the Jazz from In-Season Tournament contention.

==== West group A ====
Pos	Team	Pld	W	L	PF	PA	PD	Qualification	LAL	PHX	UTA	POR	MEM
1	Los Angeles Lakers	4	4	0	494	420	+74	Advance to knockout stage	—	122–119	131–99	107–95	134–107
2	Phoenix Suns	4	3	1	480	446	+34	Advance to knockout stage	119–122	—	131–128	120–107	110–89
3	Utah Jazz	4	2	2	469	482	−13		99–131	128–131	—	115–99	127–121
4	Portland Trail Blazers	4	1	3	416	455	−39		95–107	107–120	99–115	—	115–113 (OT)
5	Memphis Grizzlies	4	0	4	430	486	−56		107–134	89–110	121–127	113–115 (OT)	—

Source: NBA
Rules for classification: Tiebreakers

== Player statistics ==
Legend
GP	Games played	GS	Games started	MPG	Minutes per game
FG%	Field-goal percentage	3P%	3-point field-goal percentage	FT%	Free-throw percentage
RPG	Rebounds per game	APG	Assists per game	SPG	Steals per game
BPG	Blocks per game	PPG	Points per game

=== Regular season ===
Player	GP	GS	MPG	FG%	3P%	FT%	RPG	APG	SPG	BPG	PPG
Ochai Agbaji^{†}	51	10	19.7	.426	.331	.750	2.5	.9	.5	.6	5.4
Darius Bazley^{†}	6	0	23.7	.621	.250	.833	4.5	.8	1.0	1.2	8.0
Jordan Clarkson	55	19	30.6	.413	.294	.881	3.4	5.0	.6	.1	17.1
John Collins	68	66	28.0	.532	.371	.795	8.5	1.1	.6	.9	15.1
Kris Dunn	66	32	18.9	.470	.369	.688	2.9	3.8	1.0	.4	5.4
Simone Fontecchio^{†}	50	34	23.2	.450	.391	.800	3.5	1.5	.6	.4	8.9
Keyonte George	75	44	27.0	.391	.334	.848	2.8	4.4	.5	.1	13.0
Taylor Hendricks	40	23	21.4	.450	.379	.793	4.6	.8	.7	.8	7.3
Talen Horton-Tucker	51	11	19.8	.396	.330	.807	2.4	3.5	.9	.4	10.1
Johnny Juzang	20	5	18.6	.464	.416	.714	1.8	1.2	.2	.1	7.2
Walker Kessler	64	22	23.3	.654	.211	.602	7.5	.9	.5	2.4	8.1
Kira Lewis Jr.^{†}	12	0	9.9	.450	.154	.778	1.0	1.6	.3	.1	3.8
Kenneth Lofton Jr.^{†}	4	0	22.8	.600	.333	.818	5.0	4.8	.8	.5	13.8
Lauri Markkanen	55	55	33.1	.480	.399	.899	8.2	2.0	.9	.5	23.2
Kelly Olynyk^{†}	50	8	20.4	.562	.429	.842	5.1	4.4	.7	.2	8.1
Micah Potter	16	0	11.6	.475	.429	.750	2.7	.4	.3	.4	3.3
Jason Preston	7	0	10.1	.316	.000		2.4	2.3	.3	.1	1.7
Luka Šamanić	43	7	9.4	.380	.203	.786	2.4	.4	.1	.2	4.1
Brice Sensabaugh	32	11	18.3	.390	.296	.902	3.2	1.7	.4	.2	7.5
Collin Sexton	78	51	26.6	.487	.394	.859	2.6	4.9	.8	.2	18.7
Ömer Yurtseven	48	12	11.4	.538	.208	.679	4.3	.6	.2	.4	4.6

- ^{†} Denotes player spent time with another team in the season. Stats reflect time with the Jazz only.

== Transactions ==
=== Trades ===
July 7
To Atlanta Hawks

- Rudy Gay
- 2026 MEM protected second-round pick
To Utah Jazz

- John Collins

July 8
To Cleveland Cavaliers

- Damian Jones
To Utah Jazz

- Cash considerations

February 8
To Detroit Pistons

- Simone Fontecchio
To Utah Jazz

- Kevin Knox II
- Draft rights to Gabriele Procida (2022 No. 36)
- 2024 second-round pick

To Toronto Raptors

- Ochai Agbaji
- Kelly Olynyk
To Utah Jazz

- Kira Lewis Jr.
- Otto Porter Jr.
- 2024 first-round pick

=== Free agency ===
==== Re-signed ====
Player	Signed	Ref.

==== Additions ====
Player	Signed	Former Team	Ref.

==== Subtractions ====
Player	Reason	New Team	Ref.
