= 2023–24 Chicago Bulls season =

2023–24 NBA season by team

- Head coach: Billy Donovan
- President: Michael Reinsdorf
- General manager: Marc Eversley
- Owner: Jerry Reinsdorf
- Arena: United Center

Results
- Record: 39–43 (.476)
- Place: Division: 4th (Central); Conference: 9th (Eastern)
- Playoff finish: Did not qualify
- Stats at Basketball Reference

Local media
- Television: NBC Sports Chicago
- Radio: WLS; WSCR

The 2023–24 Chicago Bulls season was the 58th season for the franchise in the National Basketball Association (NBA). They failed to improve on their 40–42 record from the 2022–23 season, finishing 39–43 to give them a second straight losing record.

The team started the season with a 5–14 record through the first 19 games; however, they went 34–29 in their last 63 games. This run was led by Coby White and Ayo Dosunmu having breakout seasons with White finishing second in NBA Most Improved Player voting. The team also led the league in clutch wins at 27. This was mostly due to veteran player DeMar DeRozan leading the league in minutes played and scoring the second-most clutch points in the regular season. DeRozan was also runner-up for NBA Clutch Player of the Year, narrowly losing to Golden State Warriors guard Steph Curry.

On April 1, 2024, despite losing to the Atlanta Hawks, due to having a 2–1 record against them in the regular season, the Bulls were able to secure their second consecutive postseason with a play-in berth. The team finished 39–43 and was the 9th seed in the Eastern Conference. In the play-in tournament, they defeated the Hawks in the first stage but fell to the 8th-seeded Miami Heat in the second stage for the second consecutive time to end their season.

The Chicago Bulls drew an average home attendance of 20,624 in 41 home games in the 2023-24 NBA season, the highest in the league.

== Draft ==
The Bulls entered this draft with no draft picks. Their original first-round selection was traded to the Orlando Magic as part of a 2021 deal for Nikola Vučević after falling outside its top-4 protection following the draft lottery, while their second-round pick was traded to the Washington Wizards in 2019. Meanwhile, a second-round pick acquired from the Cleveland Cavaliers and originally owned by the Denver Nuggets was forfeited due to free agency tampering violations on their acquisition of Lonzo Ball in 2021.

== Roster ==
2023–24 Chicago Bulls roster
Players

Pos.	No.	Player	Height	Weight	DOB	From
G	2	Lonzo Ball (injured)	6 ft 6 in (1.98 m)	190 lb (86 kg)	1997-10-27	UCLA
F	17	Onuralp Bitim	6 ft 6 in (1.98 m)	215 lb (98 kg)	1999-03-31	Huntington Prep (WV)
G	5	Jevon Carter	6 ft 1 in (1.85 m)	200 lb (91 kg)	1995-09-14	West Virginia
G	6	Alex Caruso	6 ft 5 in (1.96 m)	186 lb (84 kg)	1994-02-28	Texas A&M
F	13	Torrey Craig	6 ft 5 in (1.96 m)	221 lb (100 kg)	1990-12-19	USC Upstate
G/F	11	DeMar DeRozan	6 ft 6 in (1.98 m)	220 lb (100 kg)	1989-08-07	USC
G	12	Ayo Dosunmu	6 ft 5 in (1.96 m)	200 lb (91 kg)	2000-01-17	Illinois
F	77	Henri Drell (TW)	6 ft 9 in (2.06 m)	220 lb (100 kg)	2000-04-25	Estonia
C	3	Andre Drummond	6 ft 11 in (2.11 m)	279 lb (127 kg)	1993-08-10	Connecticut
G	30	Andrew Funk (TW)	6 ft 5 in (1.96 m)	200 lb (91 kg)	1999-09-21	Penn State
G/F	24	Javonte Green	6 ft 5 in (1.96 m)	205 lb (93 kg)	1993-07-23	Radford
G	8	Zach LaVine (injured)	6 ft 5 in (1.96 m)	200 lb (91 kg)	1995-03-10	UCLA
F	15	Julian Phillips	6 ft 8 in (2.03 m)	198 lb (90 kg)	2003-11-05	Tennessee
F	21	Adama Sanogo (TW)	6 ft 9 in (2.06 m)	245 lb (111 kg)	2002-02-12	Connecticut
F	25	Dalen Terry	6 ft 7 in (2.01 m)	195 lb (88 kg)	2002-07-12	Arizona
C	9	Nikola Vučević	6 ft 10 in (2.08 m)	260 lb (118 kg)	1990-10-24	USC
G	0	Coby White	6 ft 5 in (1.96 m)	195 lb (88 kg)	2000-02-16	North Carolina
F	44	Patrick Williams (injured)	6 ft 7 in (2.01 m)	215 lb (98 kg)	2001-08-26	Florida State

Coaches
Head coach
- Billy Donovan
Assistant(s)
- John Bryant
- Maurice Cheeks
- Damian Cotter
- Chris Fleming
- Josh Longstaff
- Billy Schmidt
- Peter J. Patton

Legend
- (DP) Unsigned draft pick
- (FA) Free agent
- (S) Suspended
- (GL) On assignment to G League affiliate
- (TW) Two-way affiliate player
- Injured

Roster
Updated: April 4, 2024

== Standings ==
=== Division ===
Central Division	W	L	PCT	GB	Home	Road	Div	GP
y – Milwaukee Bucks	49	33	.598	–	31‍–‍11	18‍–‍22	10‍–‍7	82
x – Cleveland Cavaliers	48	34	.585	1.0	26‍–‍15	22‍–‍19	11‍–‍5	82
x – Indiana Pacers	47	35	.573	2.0	26‍–‍15	21‍–‍20	11‍–‍6	82
pi – Chicago Bulls	39	43	.476	10.0	20‍–‍21	19‍–‍22	7‍–‍9	82
Detroit Pistons	14	68	.171	35.0	7‍–‍33	7‍–‍35	2‍–‍14	82

=== Conference ===
Eastern Conference
#	Team	W	L	PCT	GB	GP
1	z – Boston Celtics *	64	18	.780	–	82
2	x – New York Knicks	50	32	.610	14.0	82
3	y – Milwaukee Bucks *	49	33	.598	15.0	82
4	x – Cleveland Cavaliers	48	34	.585	16.0	82
5	y – Orlando Magic *	47	35	.573	17.0	82
6	x – Indiana Pacers	47	35	.573	17.0	82
7	x – Philadelphia 76ers	47	35	.573	17.0	82
8	x – Miami Heat	46	36	.561	18.0	82
9	pi – Chicago Bulls	39	43	.476	25.0	82
10	pi – Atlanta Hawks	36	46	.439	28.0	82
11	Brooklyn Nets	32	50	.390	32.0	82
12	Toronto Raptors	25	57	.305	39.0	82
13	Charlotte Hornets	21	61	.256	43.0	82
14	Washington Wizards	15	67	.183	49.0	82
15	Detroit Pistons	14	68	.171	50.0	82

== Game log ==
=== Preseason ===
2023 preseason game log
Total: 1–4 (Home: 1–2; Road: 0–2)
Preseason: 1–4 (home: 1–2; road: 0–2)

Game	Date	Team	Score	High points	High rebounds	High assists	Location Attendance	Record
1	October 8	@ Milwaukee	L 102–105	Coby White (14)	Andre Drummond (9)	Coby White (6)	Fiserv Forum; 15,433	0–1
2	October 12	Denver	W 133–124 (2OT)	DeMar DeRozan (19)	Andre Drummond (13)	Carter, Taylor, White (4)	United Center; 19,975	1–1
3	October 15	@ Denver	L 102–116	White, Williams (20)	Andre Drummond (10)	Ayo Dosunmu (7)	Ball Arena; 17,286	1–2
4	October 17	Toronto	L 102–106	Zach LaVine (25)	Andre Drummond (13)	DeMar DeRozan (5)	United Center; 15,815	1–3
5	October 19	Minnesota	L 105–114	Nikola Vučević (21)	Nikola Vučević (10)	Caruso, DeRozan, Vučević (4)	United Center; 18,754	1–4

2023–24 preseason schedule

=== Regular season ===
2023–24 game log
Total: 39–43 (Home: 20–21; Road: 19–22)
October: 2–2 (home: 1–1; road: 1–1)

Game	Date	Team	Score	High points	High rebounds	High assists	Location Attendance	Record
1	October 25	Oklahoma City	L 104–124	DeMar DeRozan (20)	Nikola Vučević (9)	Vučević, White, Williams (4)	United Center; 21,369	0–1
2	October 27	Toronto	W 104–103 (OT)	DeMar DeRozan (33)	Alex Caruso (13)	Coby White (8)	United Center; 19,555	1–1
3	October 28	@ Detroit	L 102–118	Zach LaVine (51)	Caruso, Drummond (5)	Caruso, DeRozan (4)	Little Caesars Arena; 20,062	1–2
4	October 30	@ Indiana	W 112–105	Nikola Vučević (24)	Nikola Vučević (17)	DeMar DeRozan (4)	Gainbridge Fieldhouse; 15,021	2–2

November: 4–12 (home: 4–5; road: 0–7)

Game	Date	Team	Score	High points	High rebounds	High assists	Location Attendance	Record
5	November 1	@ Dallas	L 105–114	Zach LaVine (22)	Nikola Vučević (20)	DeMar DeRozan (7)	American Airlines Center; 20,103	2–3
6	November 3	Brooklyn	L 107–109	DeRozan, LaVine (24)	Nikola Vučević (13)	Zach LaVine (5)	United Center; 20,645	2–4
7	November 4	@ Denver	L 101–123	Nikola Vučević (19)	Andre Drummond (11)	DeMar DeRozan (6)	Ball Arena; 19,610	2–5
8	November 6	Utah	W 130–113	Zach LaVine (24)	Nikola Vučević (8)	Coby White (7)	United Center; 18,031	3–5
9	November 8	Phoenix	L 115–116 (OT)	Nikola Vučević (26)	Zach LaVine (8)	Zach LaVine (8)	United Center; 18,220	3–6
10	November 12	Detroit	W 119–108	DeMar DeRozan (29)	Andre Drummond (13)	Coby White (7)	United Center; 19,088	4–6
11	November 13	@ Milwaukee	L 109–118	Nikola Vučević (26)	Craig, Vučević (12)	DeMar DeRozan (7)	Fiserv Forum; 17,865	4–7
12	November 15	Orlando	L 94–96	Zach LaVine (19)	Andre Drummond (14)	Caruso, LaVine, Vučević (3)	United Center; 19,092	4–8
13	November 17	Orlando	L 97–103	Zach LaVine (34)	Nikola Vučević (10)	Nikola Vučević (6)	United Center; 20,235	4–9
14	November 18	Miami	W 102–97	DeMar DeRozan (23)	Andre Drummond (9)	Zach LaVine (6)	United Center; 18,063	5–9
15	November 20	Miami	L 100–118	Coby White (20)	Nikola Vučević (7)	DeRozan, LaVine (5)	United Center; 19,258	5–10
16	November 22	@ Oklahoma City	L 102–116	DeMar DeRozan (25)	Nikola Vučević (12)	DeMar DeRozan (6)	Paycom Center; 18,203	5–11
17	November 24	@ Toronto	L 108–121	Zach LaVine (36)	Nikola Vučević (8)	Nikola Vučević (5)	Scotiabank Arena; 19,800	5–12
18	November 26	@ Brooklyn	L 109–118	DeMar DeRozan (27)	Nikola Vučević (9)	DeMar DeRozan (6)	Barclays Center; 16,687	5–13
19	November 28	@ Boston	L 97–124	DeRozan, White (19)	Nikola Vučević (8)	DeMar DeRozan (6)	TD Garden; 19,156	5–14
20	November 30	Milwaukee	W 120–113 (OT)	Nikola Vučević (29)	Andre Drummond (14)	Coby White (7)	United Center; 19,838	6–14

December: 9–5 (home: 6–3; road: 3–2)

Game	Date	Team	Score	High points	High rebounds	High assists	Location Attendance	Record
21	December 2	New Orleans	W 124–118	Coby White (31)	Coby White (9)	DeMar DeRozan (10)	United Center; 20,511	7–14
22	December 6	Charlotte	W 111–100	DeMar DeRozan (29)	Nikola Vučević (12)	Coby White (5)	United Center; 17,689	8–14
23	December 8	@ San Antonio	W 121–112	Coby White (24)	Nikola Vučević (16)	DeMar DeRozan (10)	Frost Bank Center; 18,074	9–14
24	December 11	@ Milwaukee	L 129–133 (OT)	DeMar DeRozan (41)	Andre Drummond (16)	DeMar DeRozan (11)	Fiserv Forum; 17,440	9–15
25	December 12	Denver	L 106–114	Coby White (27)	Nikola Vučević (16)	Coby White (8)	United Center; 20,775	9–16
26	December 14	@ Miami	W 124–116	Coby White (26)	Nikola Vučević (12)	Coby White (11)	Kaseya Center; 19,653	10–16
27	December 16	@ Miami	L 116–118	DeMar DeRozan (27)	Nikola Vučević (11)	DeRozan, White (5)	Kaseya Center; 19,815	10–17
28	December 18	@ Philadelphia	W 108–104	Coby White (24)	Drummond, Vučević, White (8)	Coby White (9)	Wells Fargo Center; 19,773	11–17
29	December 20	L.A. Lakers	W 124–108	DeMar DeRozan (27)	Nikola Vučević (10)	DeMar DeRozan (9)	United Center; 21,234	12–17
30	December 21	San Antonio	W 114–95	Coby White (22)	Andre Drummond (8)	DeRozan, White (5)	United Center; 20,697	13–17
31	December 23	Cleveland	L 95–109	DeMar DeRozan (21)	Nikola Vučević (12)	DeMar DeRozan (8)	United Center; 19,583	13–18
32	December 26	Atlanta	W 118–113	DeMar DeRozan (25)	Andre Drummond (25)	DeMar DeRozan (6)	United Center; 21,420	14–18
33	December 28	Indiana	L 104–120	Patrick Williams (22)	Andre Drummond (16)	DeMar DeRozan (5)	United Center; 21,568	14–19
34	December 30	Philadelphia	W 105–92	DeMar DeRozan (24)	Andre Drummond (23)	Caruso, DeRozan (5)	United Center; 21,648	15–19

January: 8–7 (home: 3–2; road: 5–5)

Game	Date	Team	Score	High points	High rebounds	High assists	Location Attendance	Record
35	January 2	@ Philadelphia	L 97–110	DeMar DeRozan (16)	Andre Drummond (17)	Dalen Terry (7)	Wells Fargo Center; 19,772	15–20
36	January 3	@ New York	L 100–116	DeMar DeRozan (28)	Andre Drummond (16)	Coby White (8)	Madison Square Garden; 19,812	15–21
37	January 5	Charlotte	W 104–91	Coby White (22)	Drummond, White (10)	DeRozan, White (6)	United Center; 21,345	16–21
38	January 8	@ Charlotte	W 119–112 (OT)	Coby White (27)	Andre Drummond (15)	DeMar DeRozan (7)	Spectrum Center; 14,418	17–21
39	January 10	Houston	W 124–119 (OT)	Coby White (30)	Nikola Vučević (15)	Coby White (8)	United Center; 21,149	18–21
40	January 12	Golden State	L 131–140	DeMar DeRozan (39)	Zach LaVine (8)	LaVine, White, Williams (7)	United Center; 21,153	18–22
41	January 13	@ San Antonio	W 122–116	Nikola Vučević (24)	Nikola Vučević (16)	Zach LaVine (7)	Frost Bank Center; 18,354	19–22
42	January 15	@ Cleveland	L 91–109	Coby White (18)	Drummond, Vučević (10)	LaVine, Vučević (4)	Rocket Mortgage FieldHouse; 19,432	19–23
43	January 18	@ Toronto	W 116–110	DeRozan, Vučević (24)	Nikola Vučević (13)	Nikola Vučević (7)	Scotiabank Arena; 19,312	20–23
44	January 20	Memphis	W 125–96	Ayo Dosunmu (20)	Nikola Vučević (11)	DeMar DeRozan (8)	United Center; 21,441	21–23
45	January 22	@ Phoenix	L 113–115	Coby White (26)	Nikola Vučević (17)	Coby White (9)	Footprint Center; 17,071	21–24
46	January 25	@ L.A. Lakers	L 132–141	DeMar DeRozan (32)	Andre Drummond (9)	DeMar DeRozan (10)	Crypto.com Arena; 18,997	21–25
47	January 28	@ Portland	W 104–96	DeMar DeRozan (20)	DeRozan, Drummond, Vučević (7)	Coby White (9)	Moda Center; 17,899	22–25
48	January 30	Toronto	L 107–118	DeMar DeRozan (25)	Nikola Vučević (9)	Coby White (6)	United Center; 21,259	22–26
49	January 31	@ Charlotte	W 117–110	Coby White (35)	Nikola Vučević (12)	Coby White (9)	Spectrum Center; 13,712	23–26

February: 5–5 (home: 2–3; road: 3–2)

Game	Date	Team	Score	High points	High rebounds	High assists	Location Attendance	Record
50	February 3	Sacramento	L 115–123	Coby White (26)	Nikola Vučević (12)	Caruso, DeRozan (6)	United Center; 21,579	23–27
51	February 6	Minnesota	W 129–123 (OT)	DeRozan, White (33)	Andre Drummond (16)	Coby White (7)	United Center; 20,949	24–27
52	February 8	@ Memphis	W 118–110	DeMar DeRozan (30)	Andre Drummond (13)	Coby White (8)	FedExForum; 16,285	25–27
53	February 10	@ Orlando	L 108–114 (OT)	DeMar DeRozan (28)	Nikola Vučević (17)	Coby White (7)	Kia Center; 19,459	25–28
54	February 12	@ Atlanta	W 136–126	DeRozan, Dosunmu (29)	Drummond, Vučević (11)	Dosunmu, White (7)	State Farm Arena; 16,524	26–28
55	February 14	@ Cleveland	L 105–108	Coby White (32)	Andre Drummond (15)	DeMar DeRozan (6)	Rocket Mortgage FieldHouse; 19,432	26–29
56	February 22	Boston	L 112–129	Nikola Vučević (22)	Nikola Vučević (14)	Ayo Dosunmu (8)	United Center; 20,313	26–30
57	February 25	@ New Orleans	W 114–106	DeMar DeRozan (24)	Nikola Vučević (13)	Ayo Dosunmu (8)	Smoothie King Center; 18,684	27–30
58	February 27	Detroit	L 95–105	DeRozan, Vučević (25)	Andre Drummond (11)	Dosunmu, White (6)	United Center; 21,089	27–31
59	February 28	Cleveland	W 132–123 (2OT)	DeMar DeRozan (35)	Andre Drummond (26)	Coby White (12)	United Center; 21,700	28–31

March: 8–8 (home: 3–5; road: 5–3)

Game	Date	Team	Score	High points	High rebounds	High assists	Location Attendance	Record
60	March 1	Milwaukee	L 97–113	Coby White (22)	Andre Drummond (10)	DeMar DeRozan (9)	United Center; 21,249	28–32
61	March 4	@ Sacramento	W 113–109	Coby White (37)	Nikola Vučević (13)	Caruso, White (7)	Golden 1 Center; 17,832	29–32
62	March 6	@ Utah	W 119–117	DeMar DeRozan (29)	Nikola Vučević (12)	Ayo Dosunmu (9)	Delta Center; 18,206	30–32
63	March 7	@ Golden State	W 125–122	DeRozan, Vučević (33)	Nikola Vučević (11)	Coby White (7)	Chase Center; 18,064	31–32
64	March 9	@ L.A. Clippers	L 102–112	DeMar DeRozan (24)	Nikola Vučević (11)	DeMar DeRozan (10)	Crypto.com Arena; 19,370	31–33
65	March 11	Dallas	L 92–127	Onuralp Bitim (17)	Andre Drummond (10)	Ayo Dosunmu (6)	United Center; 21,363	31–34
66	March 13	@ Indiana	W 132–129 (OT)	DeMar DeRozan (46)	Nikola Vučević (12)	Alex Caruso (7)	Gainbridge Fieldhouse; 17,274	32–34
67	March 14	L.A. Clippers	L 111–126	DeMar DeRozan (21)	Andre Drummond (7)	Alex Caruso (6)	United Center; 21,219	32–35
68	March 16	Washington	W 127–98	Ayo Dosunmu (34)	Nikola Vučević (13)	Ayo Dosunmu (9)	United Center; 21,697	33–35
69	March 18	Portland	W 110–107	DeMar DeRozan (28)	Andre Drummond (11)	Ayo Dosunmu (10)	United Center; 20,293	34–35
70	March 21	@ Houston	L 117–127	Ayo Dosunmu (35)	Nikola Vučević (14)	Nikola Vučević (6)	Toyota Center; 17,016	34–36
71	March 23	Boston	L 113–124	DeMar DeRozan (28)	DeRozan, Drummond (6)	Coby White (10)	United Center; 21,198	34–37
72	March 25	Washington	L 105–107	DeMar DeRozan (27)	Nikola Vučević (16)	DeMar DeRozan (6)	United Center; 21,726	34–38
73	March 27	Indiana	W 125–99	DeMar DeRozan (27)	Nikola Vučević (12)	Alex Caruso (7)	United Center; 22,018	35–38
74	March 29	@ Brooklyn	L 108–125	DeMar DeRozan (31)	Andre Drummond (11)	Coby White (9)	Barclays Center; 17,894	35–39
75	March 31	@ Minnesota	W 109–101	DeMar DeRozan (27)	Andre Drummond (9)	DeMar DeRozan (8)	Target Center; 18,024	36–39

April: 3–4 (home: 1–2; road: 2–2)

Game	Date	Team	Score	High points	High rebounds	High assists	Location Attendance	Record
76	April 1	Atlanta	L 101–113	DeMar DeRozan (31)	Andre Drummond (18)	DeMar DeRozan (5)	United Center; 21,114	36–40
77	April 5	New York	W 108–100	Javonte Green (25)	Andre Drummond (16)	DeMar DeRozan (10)	United Center; 21,599	37–40
78	April 7	@ Orlando	L 98–113	DeMar DeRozan (30)	Andre Drummond (10)	Coby White (6)	Kia Center; 19,276	37–41
79	April 9	New York	L 117–128	DeMar DeRozan (34)	Javonte Green (12)	Caruso, DeRozan, White (6)	United Center; 21,648	37–42
80	April 11	@ Detroit	W 127–105	DeMar DeRozan (39)	Nikola Vučević (11)	Alex Caruso (10)	Little Caesars Arena; 20,013	38–42
81	April 12	@ Washington	W 129–127	Javonte Green (24)	Adama Sanogo (20)	Jevon Carter (12)	Capital One Arena; 20,333	39–42
82	April 14	@ New York	L 119–120 (OT)	DeMar DeRozan (30)	Nikola Vučević (11)	Alex Caruso (8)	Madison Square Garden; 19,812	39–43

2023–24 season schedule

=== Play-in ===
2024 play-in game log
Total: 1–1 (Home: 1–0; Road: 0–1)
Play-in: 1–1 (home: 1–0; road: 0–1)

Game	Date	Team	Score	High points	High rebounds	High assists	Location Attendance	Record
1	April 17	Atlanta	W 131–116	Coby White (42)	Nikola Vučević (12)	DeMar DeRozan (9)	United Center; 21,627	1–0
2	April 19	@ Miami	L 91–112	DeMar DeRozan (22)	Nikola Vučević (14)	Nikola Vučević (5)	Kaseya Center; 19,600	1–1

2023–24 season schedule

=== In-Season Tournament ===
This was the first regular season where all the NBA teams competed in a mid-season tournament setting due to the implementation of the 2023 NBA In-Season Tournament. During the in-season tournament period, the Bulls competed in Group C of the Eastern Conference, which included the Boston Celtics, Brooklyn Nets, Toronto Raptors, and Orlando Magic.

==== East group C ====
Pos	Team	Pld	W	L	PF	PA	PD	Qualification	BOS	ORL	BKN	TOR	CHI
1	Boston Celtics	4	3 (Note: Tied on head-to-head results. Overall point difference is used as the tiebreaker.)	1	449	422	+27	Advance to knockout stage	—	96–113	121–107	108–105	124–97
2	Orlando Magic	4	3	1	446	424	+22		113–96	—	104–124	126–107	103–97
3	Brooklyn Nets	4	3	1	455	435	+20		107–121	124–104	—	115–103	109–107
4	Toronto Raptors	4	1	3	436	457	−21		105–108	107–126	103–115	—	121–108
5	Chicago Bulls	4	0	4	409	457	−48		97–124	97–103	107–109	108–121	—

Source: NBA
Rules for classification: Tiebreakers

== Player statistics ==
Player	Pos.	GP	GS	MP	Reb.	Ast.	Stl.	Blk.	Pts.
Onuralp Bitim	SG	23	1	268	32	13	3	2	80
Jevon Carter	PG	72	0	1,004	60	94	37	16	357
Alex Caruso	PG	71	57	2,040	273	247	120	70	715
Torrey Craig	F	53	14	1,049	217	58	30	21	303
DeMar DeRozan	SF	79	79	2,989	340	421	90	45	1,897
Ayo Dosunmu	G	76	37	2,212	216	242	68	36	924
Henri Drell	SF	4	0	30	4	4	2	1	11
Andre Drummond	C	79	10	1,351	708	37	73	48	663
Andrew Funk	SG	5	0	13	0	0	1	1	0
Javonte Green^{≠}	SF/SG	9	5	230	67	5	10	8	110
Zach LaVine	SG	25	23	872	129	98	21	8	487
Julian Phillips	SF	40	0	323	36	13	7	7	89
Adama Sanogo	PF	9	0	66	36	0	1	0	36
Terry Taylor^{‡}	PF	31	0	188	37	10	5	2	46
Dalen Terry	G	59	2	681	113	81	27	18	180
Nikola Vučević	C	76	74	2,610	801	254	50	60	1,370
Coby White	PG	79	78	2,881	358	405	53	18	1,509
Patrick Williams	PF	43	30	1,174	166	66	40	33	429

After all games.
^{‡}Waived during the season
^{†}Traded during the season
^{≠}Acquired during the season

== Transactions ==
=== Trades ===
June 28, 2023	To Chicago Bulls Draft rights to Julian Phillips (No. 35)	To Washington Wizards 2026 CHI second-round pick 2027 CHI second-round pick

=== Free agency ===
==== Re-signed ====
Date	Player	Ref.
June 28	Nikola Vučević	
June 30	Coby White	
July 21	Ayo Dosunmu	

==== Additions ====
Date	Player	Former team	Ref.
June 26	Adama Sanogo	UConn Huskies	
June 30	Jevon Carter	Milwaukee Bucks	
July 3	Torrey Craig	Phoenix Suns	
July 21	Onuralp Bitim	Frutti Extra Bursaspor	

==== Subtractions ====
Date	Player	Reason	New team	Ref.
July 1	Patrick Beverley	Free agency	Philadelphia 76ers	
July 6	Marko Simonović	Waived	Crvena zvezda	
