= 2023–24 Toronto Raptors season =

- Head coach: Darko Rajaković
- President: Masai Ujiri
- General manager: Bobby Webster
- Owners: Maple Leaf Sports & Entertainment
- Arena: Scotiabank Arena

Results
- Record: 25–57 (.305)
- Place: Division: 5th (Atlantic); Conference: 12th (Eastern)
- Playoff finish: Did not qualify
- Stats at Basketball Reference

Local media
- Television: TSN; Sportsnet

The 2023–24 Toronto Raptors season was the 29th season for the franchise in the National Basketball Association (NBA). On April 21, 2023, the Raptors fired head coach Nick Nurse after five seasons with the team. On June 13, 2023, the Raptors hired Darko Rajaković as their head coach. On July 7, 2023, Fred VanVleet signed a three-year contract worth $130 million with the Houston Rockets in free agency, leaving the team after seven seasons. Near the end of the 2023 calendar year, on December 30, the Toronto Raptors not only agreed to trade OG Anunoby, Precious Achiuwa, and Malachi Flynn to the New York Knicks for RJ Barrett, Immanuel Quickley, and a 2024 second round pick from the Detroit Pistons, but also ended up being the team to end the Pistons' record-holding 28-game losing streak for the regular season with a 129–127 loss on the road. On January 17, 2024, the Raptors traded star player Pascal Siakam to the Indiana Pacers for Bruce Brown, Jordan Nwora, Kira Lewis Jr. and 3 first-round picks. Following a loss to the Denver Nuggets on March 11, 2024, the Raptors failed to improve on their 41–41 record from the previous season during which they failed to make the playoffs after being eliminated in a play-in game by the Bulls. They sealed their 2nd losing season in the last decade and first in a full 82-game season since the 2012–13 season. After a loss to the New York Knicks and an Atlanta Hawks win over the Portland Trail Blazers on March 27, the Toronto Raptors were eliminated from playoff contention for the 2nd consecutive season.

Near the end of the Raptors' season, two-way contract player Jontay Porter would be investigated by the NBA directly on betting irregulates involved between January and March 2024. The games in question specifically revolved around losses with the Raptors on January 26 against the Los Angeles Clippers and March 20 against the Sacramento Kings, both of which had Porter leaving early due to complaints of injury or illness coming about (with both games coincidentally having Toronto losing by at least 20 points, if not more than that), though at least 11 more games were also bet upon as well. After the Raptors' season officially ended, the NBA would ban Porter from the NBA and the NBA G League development league for life on April 17 (three days after the Toronto Raptors' season concluded) following their own conclusive evidence they picked up. Porter would become the first NBA player to be banned for life for gambling purposes since Jack Molinas back in 1954, as well as the first player to be banned for life without a way to return to the NBA since Richard Dumas in 1996. He would also later face federal charges in relation to his case while playing in Toronto alongside four other co-conspirators, with those charges being faced both in the United States and in Canada due to his case involving both nations. Porter would later admit his guilt to said charges in relation to his case out in the U.S.A. while playing with the Raptors alongside the four other co-conspirators.

The Toronto Raptors drew an average home attendance of 19,515 in 41 home games in the 2023-24 NBA season. The total attendance was 800,129.

== Draft ==
Round	Pick	Player	Position(s)	Nationality	College / Club
1	13	Gradey Dick	SG	United States	Kansas

The Raptors entered this draft with a first-round pick. They had traded their second-round pick to the San Antonio Spurs as part of a February 2023 trade that brought Jakob Pöltl back to Toronto.

== Roster ==
2023–24 Toronto Raptors roster
Players

Pos.	No.	Player	Height	Weight	DOB	From
G	30	Ochai Agbaji (injured)	6 ft 5 in (1.96 m)	215 lb (98 kg)	2000-04-20	Kansas
G/F	4	Scottie Barnes (injured)	6 ft 7 in (2.01 m)	237 lb (108 kg)	2001-08-01	Florida State
G/F	9	RJ Barrett (injured)	6 ft 6 in (1.98 m)	214 lb (97 kg)	2000-06-14	Duke
F	25	Chris Boucher (injured)	6 ft 9 in (2.06 m)	200 lb (91 kg)	1993-01-11	Oregon
G/F	11	Bruce Brown	6 ft 4 in (1.93 m)	202 lb (92 kg)	1996-08-15	Miami (FL)
G	3	D. J. Carton (injured) (TW)	6 ft 3 in (1.91 m)	200 lb (91 kg)	2000-08-05	Marquette
G/F	1	Gradey Dick	6 ft 6 in (1.98 m)	200 lb (91 kg)	2003-11-20	Kansas
G	0	Javon Freeman-Liberty	6 ft 3 in (1.91 m)	190 lb (86 kg)	1999-10-20	DePaul
F	16	Mouhamadou Gueye (TW)	6 ft 9 in (2.06 m)	210 lb (95 kg)	1998-07-06	Pittsburgh
F	2	Jalen McDaniels	6 ft 9 in (2.06 m)	190 lb (86 kg)	1998-01-31	San Diego State
F	13	Jordan Nwora	6 ft 8 in (2.03 m)	225 lb (102 kg)	1998-09-09	Louisville
F/C	41	Kelly Olynyk (injured)	6 ft 11 in (2.11 m)	240 lb (109 kg)	1991-04-19	Gonzaga
F/C	34	Jontay Porter (TW)	6 ft 11 in (2.11 m)	240 lb (109 kg)	1999-11-15	Missouri
C	19	Jakob Pöltl (injured)	7 ft 0 in (2.13 m)	260 lb (118 kg)	1995-10-15	Utah
G	5	Immanuel Quickley	6 ft 2 in (1.88 m)	190 lb (86 kg)	1999-06-17	Kentucky
G/F	17	Garrett Temple	6 ft 5 in (1.96 m)	195 lb (88 kg)	1986-05-08	LSU
G	33	Gary Jr. Trent	6 ft 4 in (1.93 m)	205 lb (93 kg)	1999-01-18	Duke
F/C	35	Malik Williams	6 ft 11 in (2.11 m)	250 lb (113 kg)	1998-08-26	Louisville

Coaches
Head coach
- Darko Rajaković
Assistant(s)
- Mery Andrade
- Michael Batiste
- Vin Bhavnani
- Pat Delany
- Drew Jones
- Jama Mahlalela
- Jim Sann
- Ivo Simović
- James Wade

Legend
- (DP) Unsigned draft pick
- (FA) Free agent
- (S) Suspended
- (GL) On assignment to G League affiliate
- (TW) Two-way affiliate player
- Injured

Roster
Updated: April 14, 2024

== Standings ==
=== Division ===
Atlantic Division	W	L	PCT	GB	Home	Road	Div	GP
z – Boston Celtics	64	18	.780	–	37‍–‍4	27‍–‍14	15‍–‍2	82
x – New York Knicks	50	32	.610	14.0	27‍–‍14	23‍–‍18	12‍–‍5	82
x – Philadelphia 76ers	47	35	.573	17.0	25‍–‍16	22‍–‍19	8‍–‍8	82
Brooklyn Nets	32	50	.390	32.0	20‍–‍21	12‍–‍29	5‍–‍11	82
Toronto Raptors	25	57	.305	39.0	14‍–‍27	11‍–‍30	1‍–‍15	82

=== Conference ===
Eastern Conference
#	Team	W	L	PCT	GB	GP
1	z – Boston Celtics *	64	18	.780	–	82
2	x – New York Knicks	50	32	.610	14.0	82
3	y – Milwaukee Bucks *	49	33	.598	15.0	82
4	x – Cleveland Cavaliers	48	34	.585	16.0	82
5	y – Orlando Magic *	47	35	.573	17.0	82
6	x – Indiana Pacers	47	35	.573	17.0	82
7	x – Philadelphia 76ers	47	35	.573	17.0	82
8	x – Miami Heat	46	36	.561	18.0	82
9	pi – Chicago Bulls	39	43	.476	25.0	82
10	pi – Atlanta Hawks	36	46	.439	28.0	82
11	Brooklyn Nets	32	50	.390	32.0	82
12	Toronto Raptors	25	57	.305	39.0	82
13	Charlotte Hornets	21	61	.256	43.0	82
14	Washington Wizards	15	67	.183	49.0	82
15	Detroit Pistons	14	68	.171	50.0	82

Notes

- z – Clinched home court advantage for the entire playoffs
- c – Clinched home court advantage for the conference playoffs
- y – Clinched division title
- x – Clinched playoff spot
- pi – Clinched play-in tournament spot
- * – Division leader
- o – Eliminated from postseason contention

== Game log ==
=== Preseason ===
2023 preseason game log
Total: 4–0 (Home: 3–0; Road: 1–0)
Preseason: 4–0 (home: 3–0; road: 1–0)

Game	Date	Team	Score	High points	High rebounds	High assists	Location Attendance	Record
1	October 8	Sacramento	W 112–99	Gary Trent Jr. (22)	Scottie Barnes (7)	Flynn, Schröder (5)	(Canada) Rogers Arena; 18,654	1–0
2	October 15	Cairns	W 134–93	Javon Freeman-Liberty (15)	Chris Boucher (8)	Pascal Siakam (5)	Scotiabank Arena; 18,141	2–0
3	October 17	@ Chicago	W 106–102	Pascal Siakam (22)	Malachi Flynn (7)	Schröder, Trent Jr. (4)	United Center; 15,815	3–0
4	October 20	Washington	W 134–98	Scottie Barnes (23)	Jakob Pöltl (9)	Dennis Schröder (11)	Scotiabank Arena; 18,426	4–0

2023–24 preseason schedule

=== Regular season ===
2023–24 game log
Total: 25–57 (Home: 14–27; Road: 11–30)
October: 1–3 (home: 1–2; road: 0–1)

Game	Date	Team	Score	High points	High rebounds	High assists	Location Attendance	Record
1	October 25	Minnesota	W 97–94	Dennis Schröder (22)	Jakob Pöltl (11)	Dennis Schröder (7)	Scotiabank Arena; 19,800	1–0
2	October 27	@ Chicago	L 103–104 (OT)	Scottie Barnes (22)	Scottie Barnes (10)	Barnes, Schröder (10)	United Center; 19,555	1–1
3	October 28	Philadelphia	L 107–114	Scottie Barnes (24)	Scottie Barnes (8)	Dennis Schröder (10)	Scotiabank Arena; 19,800	1–2
4	October 30	Portland	L 91–99	Barnes, Siakam (20)	Scottie Barnes (12)	Dennis Schröder (8)	Scotiabank Arena; 19,266	1–3

November: 8–7 (home: 5–2; road: 3–5)

Game	Date	Team	Score	High points	High rebounds	High assists	Location Attendance	Record
5	November 1	Milwaukee	W 130–111	Pascal Siakam (26)	Scottie Barnes (12)	Dennis Schröder (11)	Scotiabank Arena; 19,800	2–3
6	November 2	@ Philadelphia	L 99–114	Scottie Barnes (24)	Jakob Pöltl (9)	Dennis Schröder (10)	Wells Fargo Center; 19,773	2–4
7	November 5	@ San Antonio	W 123–116	Scottie Barnes (30)	Scottie Barnes (11)	Barnes, Schröder (6)	Frost Bank Center; 18,354	3–4
8	November 8	@ Dallas	W 127–116	Pascal Siakam (31)	Scottie Barnes (14)	Scottie Barnes (7)	American Airlines Center; 20,063	4–4
9	November 11	@ Boston	L 94–117	Pascal Siakam (17)	Pascal Siakam (7)	Precious Achiuwa (5)	TD Garden; 19,156	4–5
10	November 13	Washington	W 111–107	Pascal Siakam (39)	Pascal Siakam (11)	Pascal Siakam (7)	Scotiabank Arena; 19,800	5–5
11	November 15	Milwaukee	L 112–128	Scottie Barnes (29)	Jakob Pöltl (11)	Scottie Barnes (7)	Scotiabank Arena; 19,800	5–6
12	November 17	Boston	L 105–108	Schröder, Siakam (23)	Precious Achiuwa (9)	Barnes, Schröder (6)	Scotiabank Arena; 19,800	5–7
13	November 19	Detroit	W 142–113	Pascal Siakam (23)	Jakob Pöltl (10)	Scottie Barnes (9)	Scotiabank Arena; 19,182	6–7
14	November 21	@ Orlando	L 107–126	Dennis Schröder (24)	Jakob Pöltl (10)	Pascal Siakam (8)	Amway Center; 18,846	6–8
15	November 22	@ Indiana	W 132–131	Pascal Siakam (36)	Scottie Barnes (12)	Jakob Pöltl (6)	Gainbridge Fieldhouse; 17,091	7–8
16	November 24	Chicago	W 121–108	OG Anunoby (26)	Barnes, Pöltl (10)	Pascal Siakam (8)	Scotiabank Arena; 19,800	8–8
17	November 26	@ Cleveland	L 102–105	Pöltl, Siakam (18)	Jakob Pöltl (13)	Pascal Siakam (6)	Rocket Mortgage FieldHouse; 19,432	8–9
18	November 28	@ Brooklyn	L 103–115	Barnes, Siakam (17)	Scottie Barnes (11)	Dennis Schröder (9)	Barclays Center; 15,844	8–10
19	November 29	Phoenix	W 112–105	Scottie Barnes (23)	Precious Achiuwa (10)	Dennis Schröder (12)	Scotiabank Arena; 19,800	9–10

December: 3–10 (home: 2–5; road: 1–5)

Game	Date	Team	Score	High points	High rebounds	High assists	Location Attendance	Record
20	December 1	New York	L 106–119	Scottie Barnes (29)	Jakob Pöltl (12)	Dennis Schröder (9)	Scotiabank Arena; 19,800	9–11
21	December 6	Miami	L 103–112	Pascal Siakam (30)	Scottie Barnes (11)	Anunoby, Siakam (6)	Scotiabank Arena; 19,084	9–12
22	December 8	@ Charlotte	L 116–119	Scottie Barnes (31)	Achiuwa, Barnes (10)	Scottie Barnes (10)	Spectrum Center; 11,526	9–13
23	December 11	@ New York	L 130–136	OG Anunoby (29)	Jakob Pöltl (8)	Dennis Schröder (10)	Madison Square Garden; 19,812	9–14
24	December 13	Atlanta	W 135–128	Pascal Siakam (33)	Jakob Pöltl (13)	Malachi Flynn (8)	Scotiabank Arena; 19,423	10–14
25	December 15	Atlanta	L 104–125	Scottie Barnes (23)	Jakob Pöltl (8)	Scottie Barnes (8)	Scotiabank Arena; 19,800	10–15
26	December 18	Charlotte	W 114–99	Pascal Siakam (27)	Scottie Barnes (17)	Pascal Siakam (8)	Scotiabank Arena; 19,288	11–15
27	December 20	Denver	L 104–113	Scottie Barnes (30)	Scottie Barnes (10)	Dennis Schröder (7)	Scotiabank Arena; 19,800	11–16
28	December 22	@ Philadelphia	L 111–121	Pascal Siakam (31)	Jakob Pöltl (8)	Scottie Barnes (8)	Wells Fargo Center; 20,230	11–17
29	December 23	Utah	L 119–126	Scottie Barnes (32)	Scottie Barnes (14)	Barnes, Schröder (7)	Scotiabank Arena; 19,420	11–18
30	December 27	@ Washington	W 132–102	OG Anunoby (26)	Scottie Barnes (12)	Pascal Siakam (11)	Capital One Arena; 15,437	12–18
31	December 29	@ Boston	L 118–120	Scottie Barnes (30)	Barnes, Pöltl (10)	Dennis Schröder (9)	TD Garden; 19,156	12–19
32	December 30	@ Detroit	L 127–129	Pascal Siakam (35)	Jakob Pöltl (14)	Dennis Schröder (9)	Little Caesars Arena; 18,411	12–20

January : 5–10 (home: 2–4; road: 3–6)

Game	Date	Team	Score	High points	High rebounds	High assists	Location Attendance	Record
33	January 1	Cleveland	W 124–121	Pascal Siakam (36)	Jakob Pöltl (11)	Dennis Schröder (8)	Scotiabank Arena; 19,800	13–20
34	January 3	@ Memphis	W 116–111	Immanuel Quickley (26)	Boucher, Pöltl (8)	Scottie Barnes (8)	FedExForum; 16,385	14–20
35	January 5	@ Sacramento	L 130–135	Barnes, Quickley (20)	Chris Boucher (9)	Pascal Siakam (9)	Golden 1 Center; 17,941	14–21
36	January 7	@ Golden State	W 133–118	RJ Barrett (37)	Jakob Pöltl (11)	Immanuel Quickley (10)	Chase Center; 18,064	15–21
37	January 9	@ L.A. Lakers	L 131–132	Scottie Barnes (26)	RJ Barrett (10)	Barnes, Schröder (6)	Crypto.com Arena; 18,997	15–22
38	January 10	@ L.A. Clippers	L 120–126	Immanuel Quickley (25)	Barnes, J. Porter (7)	Barnes, Quickley (6)	Crypto.com Arena; 19,370	15–23
39	January 12	@ Utah	L 113–145	Pascal Siakam (27)	RJ Barrett (7)	Jontay Porter (6)	Delta Center; 18,206	15–24
40	January 15	Boston	L 96–105	RJ Barrett (24)	Scottie Barnes (13)	Thaddeus Young (7)	Scotiabank Arena; 19,278	15–25
41	January 17	Miami	W 121–97	Gary Trent Jr. (28)	three players (8)	Immanuel Quickley (9)	Scotiabank Arena; 19,631	16–25
42	January 18	Chicago	L 110–116	Scottie Barnes (31)	Chris Boucher (9)	Barnes, Barrett (6)	Scotiabank Arena; 19,312	16–26
43	January 20	@ New York	L 100–126	RJ Barrett (20)	RJ Barrett (8)	Immanuel Quickley (11)	Madison Square Garden; 19,812	16–27
44	January 22	Memphis	L 100–108	RJ Barrett (29)	Scottie Barnes (12)	Immanuel Quickley (10)	Scotiabank Arena; 18,577	16–28
45	January 26	L.A. Clippers	L 107–127	Scottie Barnes (23)	Bruce Brown (9)	Dennis Schröder (5)	Scotiabank Arena; 19,800	16–29
46	January 28	@ Atlanta	L 125–126	Barnes, Nwora (24)	Brown, Nwora (9)	Scottie Barnes (8)	State Farm Arena; 15,658	16–30
47	January 30	@ Chicago	W 118–107	Gary Trent Jr. (24)	Bruce Brown (7)	Dennis Schröder (10)	United Center; 21,259	17–30

February: 5–7 (home: 2–4; road: 3–3)

Game	Date	Team	Score	High points	High rebounds	High assists	Location Attendance	Record
48	February 2	@ Houston	L 106–135	Scottie Barnes (28)	Barnes, Dick (7)	Immanuel Quickley (6)	Toyota Center; 18,055	17–31
49	February 4	@ Oklahoma City	L 127–135 (2OT)	RJ Barrett (23)	Jakob Pöltl (12)	Immanuel Quickley (11)	Paycom Center; 17,059	17–32
50	February 5	@ New Orleans	L 100–138	Gradey Dick (22)	Jakob Pöltl (9)	Immanuel Quickley (6)	Smoothie King Center; 17,429	17–33
51	February 7	@ Charlotte	W 123–117	RJ Barrett (23)	Jakob Pöltl (12)	Barnes, Barrett, Schröder (5)	Spectrum Center; 11,720	18–33
52	February 9	Houston	W 107–104	Immanuel Quickley (25)	Jakob Pöltl (13)	Scottie Barnes (8)	Scotiabank Arena; 19,800	19–33
53	February 10	Cleveland	L 95–119	Scottie Barnes (24)	Scottie Barnes (10)	Scottie Barnes (10)	Scotiabank Arena; 19,800	19–34
54	February 12	San Antonio	L 99–122	Gradey Dick (18)	Scottie Barnes (9)	Scottie Barnes (9)	Scotiabank Arena; 19,800	19–35
55	February 14	Indiana	L 125–127	Scottie Barnes (29)	Scottie Barnes (12)	Scottie Barnes (8)	Scotiabank Arena; 19,800	19–36
All-Star Game
56	February 22	Brooklyn	W 121–93	Gary Trent Jr. (25)	Scottie Barnes (12)	RJ Barrett (7)	Scotiabank Arena; 19,800	20–36
57	February 23	@ Atlanta	W 123–121	Immanuel Quickley (24)	Jakob Pöltl (13)	Scottie Barnes (10)	State Farm Arena; 17,625	21–36
58	February 26	@ Indiana	W 130–122	RJ Barrett (24)	Scottie Barnes (12)	Scottie Barnes (12)	Gainbridge Fieldhouse; 16,026	22–36
59	February 28	Dallas	L 125–136	Immanuel Quickley (28)	Scottie Barnes (11)	Immanuel Quickley (9)	Scotiabank Arena; 19,800	22–37

March : 1–14 (home: 1–8; road: 0–6)

Game	Date	Team	Score	High points	High rebounds	High assists	Location Attendance	Record
60	March 1	Golden State	L 105–120	RJ Barrett (23)	Jakob Pöltl (14)	Immanuel Quickley (11)	Scotiabank Arena; 19,800	22–38
61	March 3	Charlotte	W 111–106	RJ Barrett (23)	Ochai Agbaji (9)	Immanuel Quickley (11)	Scotiabank Arena; 19,512	23–38
62	March 5	New Orleans	L 98–139	Immanuel Quickley (17)	Immanuel Quickley (7)	Quickley, Olynyk (7)	Scotiabank Arena; 18,864	23–39
63	March 7	@ Phoenix	L 113–120	Gary Trent Jr. (30)	Boucher, Quickley (9)	Immanuel Quickley (18)	Footprint Center; 17,071	23–40
64	March 9	@ Portland	L 118–128 (OT)	Immanuel Quickley (29)	Jalen McDaniels (10)	Kelly Olynyk (8)	Moda Center; 18,117	23–41
65	March 11	@ Denver	L 119–125	RJ Barrett (26)	Bruce Brown (10)	RJ Barrett (9)	Ball Arena; 19,652	23–42
66	March 13	@ Detroit	L 104–113	Immanuel Quickley (25)	Jahmi'us Ramsey (7)	Olynyk, Quickley (8)	Little Caesars Arena; 19,313	23–43
67	March 15	Orlando	L 103–113	Gary Trent Jr. (31)	Kelly Olynyk (9)	Immanuel Quickley (10)	Scotiabank Arena; 19,800	23–44
68	March 17	@ Orlando	L 96–111	Jordan Nwora (18)	four players (7)	Immanuel Quickley (5)	Kia Center; 18,846	23–45
69	March 20	Sacramento	L 89–123	Gary Trent Jr. (18)	Gary Trent Jr. (6)	Bruce Brown (6)	Scotiabank Arena; 18,641	23–46
70	March 22	Oklahoma City	L 103–123	Gradey Dick (21)	Ochai Agbaji (7)	Jontay Porter (8)	Scotiabank Arena; 19,601	23–47
71	March 23	@ Washington	L 109–112	Gary Trent Jr. (31)	Ochai Agbaji (9)	Kelly Olynyk (10)	Capital One Arena; 15,746	23–48
72	March 25	Brooklyn	L 88–96	Gary Trent Jr. (18)	Ochai Agbaji (5)	Kelly Olynyk (9)	Scotiabank Arena; 18,376	23–49
73	March 27	New York	L 101–145	Gradey Dick (23)	Kelly Olynyk (7)	Kelly Olynyk (8)	Scotiabank Arena; 19,133	23–50
74	March 31	Philadelphia	L 120–135	Gary Trent Jr. (23)	Javon Freeman-Liberty (7)	Kelly Olynyk (11)	Scotiabank Arena; 19,114	23–51

April: 2–6 (home: 1–2; road: 1–4)

Game	Date	Team	Score	High points	High rebounds	High assists	Location Attendance	Record
75	April 2	L.A. Lakers	L 111–128	RJ Barrett (28)	Kelly Olynyk (7)	Barrett, Quickley (6)	Scotiabank Arena; 19,800	23–52
76	April 3	@ Minnesota	L 85–133	Dick, Freeman-Liberty, Quickley (16)	Jordan Nwora (13)	Javon Freeman-Liberty (6)	Target Center; 18,024	23–53
77	April 5	@ Milwaukee	W 117–111	Gary Trent Jr. (31)	Immanuel Quickley (11)	Immanuel Quickley (9)	Fiserv Forum; 17,750	24–53
78	April 7	Washington	W 130–122	Immanuel Quickley (31)	Kelly Olynyk (9)	Immanuel Quickley (13)	Scotiabank Arena; 19,502	25–53
79	April 9	Indiana	L 123–140	RJ Barrett (23)	Malik Williams (9)	Bruce Brown (5)	Scotiabank Arena; 19,325	25–54
80	April 10	@ Brooklyn	L 102–106	Immanuel Quickley (32)	Malik Williams (14)	Immanuel Quickley (9)	Barclays Center; 17,732	25–55
81	April 12	@ Miami	L 103–125	RJ Barrett (35)	Barrett, Olynyk (11)	Olynyk (6)	Kaseya Center; 19,600	25–56
82	April 14	@ Miami	L 103–118	Gary Trent Jr (18)	Jordan Nwora (11)	Freeman-Liberty, Temple (7)	Kaseya Center; 19,600	25–57

2023–24 season schedule

=== In-Season Tournament ===
This was the first regular season where all the NBA teams competed in a mid-season tournament setting due to the implementation of the 2023 NBA In-Season Tournament. During the in-season tournament period, the Raptors competed in Group C of the Eastern Conference, which included the Boston Celtics, Brooklyn Nets, Chicago Bulls, and Orlando Magic.

==== East group C ====
Pos	Team	Pld	W	L	PF	PA	PD	Qualification	BOS	ORL	BKN	TOR	CHI
1	Boston Celtics	4	3 (Note: Tied on head-to-head results. Overall point difference is used as the tiebreaker.)	1	449	422	+27	Advance to knockout stage	—	96–113	121–107	108–105	124–97
2	Orlando Magic	4	3	1	446	424	+22		113–96	—	104–124	126–107	103–97
3	Brooklyn Nets	4	3	1	455	435	+20		107–121	124–104	—	115–103	109–107
4	Toronto Raptors	4	1	3	436	457	−21		105–108	107–126	103–115	—	121–108
5	Chicago Bulls	4	0	4	409	457	−48		97–124	97–103	107–109	108–121	—

Source: NBA
Rules for classification: Tiebreakers

== Player statistics ==
=== Regular season ===
Player	POS	GP	GS	MP	REB	AST	STL	BLK	PTS	MPG	RPG	APG	SPG	BPG	PPG
Gary Trent Jr.	SG	71	41	1,994	188	119	77	10	974	28.1	2.6	1.7	1.1	.1	13.7
Scottie Barnes	SG	60	60	2,094	494	363	75	88	1,191	34.9	8.2	6.1	1.3	1.5	19.9
Gradey Dick	SG	60	17	1,268	132	68	34	2	510	21.1	2.2	1.1	.6	.0	8.5
Dennis Schröder^{†}	PG	51	33	1,559	140	313	46	8	698	30.6	2.7	6.1	.9	.2	13.7
Jakob Pöltl	C	50	50	1,319	429	127	35	76	555	26.4	8.6	2.5	.7	1.5	11.1
Jalen McDaniels	SF	50	1	538	79	37	19	6	169	10.8	1.6	.7	.4	.1	3.4
Chris Boucher	PF	50	0	705	207	23	14	24	322	14.1	4.1	.5	.3	.5	6.4
Pascal Siakam^{†}	PF	39	39	1,354	246	190	32	10	865	34.7	6.3	4.9	.8	.3	22.2
Immanuel Quickley^{†}	PG	38	38	1,265	182	257	34	7	706	33.3	4.8	6.8	.9	.2	18.6
Bruce Brown^{†}	PG	34	11	885	130	92	24	9	328	26.0	3.8	2.7	.7	.3	9.6
Jordan Nwora^{†}	SF	34	1	529	116	44	20	12	270	15.6	3.4	1.3	.6	.4	7.9
RJ Barrett^{†}	SG	32	32	1,072	204	130	19	13	696	33.5	6.4	4.1	.6	.4	21.8
Malachi Flynn^{†}	PG	31	0	474	65	73	18	6	157	15.3	2.1	2.4	.6	.2	5.1
Kelly Olynyk^{†}	C	28	19	740	157	128	37	18	356	26.4	5.6	4.6	1.3	.6	12.7
OG Anunoby^{†}	SF	27	27	900	106	72	28	13	408	33.3	3.9	2.7	1.0	.5	15.1
Ochai Agbaji^{†}	SG	27	18	638	90	36	20	15	181	23.6	3.3	1.3	.7	.6	6.7
Garrett Temple	SG	27	2	289	45	28	12	3	88	10.7	1.7	1.0	.4	.1	3.3
Jontay Porter	PF	26	5	360	82	60	20	20	115	13.8	3.2	2.3	.8	.8	4.4
Precious Achiuwa^{†}	C	25	0	437	136	44	16	12	193	17.5	5.4	1.8	.6	.5	7.7
Thaddeus Young^{†}	PF	23	6	350	75	50	18	3	114	15.2	3.3	2.2	.8	.1	5.0
Javon Freeman-Liberty	PG	22	6	403	70	40	10	4	153	18.3	3.2	1.8	.5	.2	7.0
Otto Porter Jr.	SF	15	1	174	29	8	5	5	39	11.6	1.9	.5	.3	.3	2.6
Mouhamadou Gueye	PF	11	0	120	23	5	3	18	26	10.9	2.1	.5	.3	1.6	2.4
Malik Williams	C	7	2	107	38	2	3	4	19	15.3	5.4	.3	.4	.6	2.7
Jahmi'us Ramsey	SG	7	1	121	22	8	7	0	47	17.3	3.1	1.1	1.0	.0	6.7
Kobi Simmons	PG	4	0	67	7	12	6	2	20	16.8	1.8	3.0	1.5	.5	5.0
D. J. Carton	SG	4	0	36	4	3	1	0	11	9.0	1.0	.8	.3	.0	2.8
Markquis Nowell	SG	1	0	4	2	2	1	0	2	4.0	2.0	2.0	1.0	.0	2.0
Ron Harper Jr.	PF	1	0	4	0	1	0	0	0	4.0	.0	1.0	.0	.0	.0
Kira Lewis Jr.^{†}	PG	1	0	2	0	0	0	0	0	2.0	.0	.0	.0	.0	.0

- ^{†} Denotes player spent time with another team in the season. Stats reflect time with the Raptors only.

== Transactions ==
=== Trades ===
December 30, 2023	To Toronto Raptors RJ Barrett; Immanuel Quickley; 2024 second-round pick (via Detroit)	To New York Knicks Precious Achiuwa; O.G. Anunoby; Malachi Flynn
January 17, 2024	To Toronto Raptors Bruce Brown; Kira Lewis Jr. Jordan Nwora; 2024 two first-round picks 2026 conditional first-round pick	To Indiana Pacers Pascal Siakam
February 8, 2024	To Toronto Raptors Ochai Agbaji; Kelly Olynyk	To Utah Jazz Kira Lewis Jr. Otto Porter Jr. 2024 first-round pick
February 8, 2024	To Toronto Raptors Spencer Dinwiddie	To Brooklyn Nets Dennis Schröder; Thaddeus Young

=== Free agency ===
==== Re-signed ====
Date	Player	Ref.
July 6	Jakob Pöltl	

==== Additions ====
Date	Player	Former team	Ref.
July 3	Markquis Nowell	Kansas State Wildcats	
July 6	Jalen McDaniels	Philadelphia 76ers	
July 12	Dennis Schröder	Los Angeles Lakers	
July 22	Javon Freeman-Liberty	Windy City Bulls	
August 1	Garrett Temple	New Orleans Pelicans	
December 9	Jontay Porter	Motor City Cruise	

==== Subtractions ====
Date	Player	Reason left	New team	Ref.
July 7	Fred VanVleet	Free agency	Houston Rockets	
July 16	Dalano Banton	Free agency	Boston Celtics	
October 20	Jeff Dowtin	Waived	Delaware Blue Coats	
December 20	Ron Harper Jr.	Waived	Boston Celtics	
March 4	Markquis Nowell	Waived	Raptors 905	
