= 2023–24 Sacramento Kings season =

- Head coach: Mike Brown
- President: John Rinehart
- General manager: Monte McNair
- Owner: Vivek Ranadivé
- Arena: Golden 1 Center

Results
- Record: 46–36 (.561)
- Place: Division: 4th (Pacific); Conference: 9th (Western)
- Playoff finish: Did not qualify
- Stats at Basketball Reference

Local media
- Television: NBC Sports California; CBS 13
- Radio: KHTK Sports 1140

The 2023–24 Sacramento Kings season was the 79th season for the franchise in the National Basketball Association (NBA), and 40th season in the city of Sacramento.

The Kings won the West Group B in the inaugural 2023 NBA In-Season Tournament by going undefeated at 4–0 in the group stage. However, they were eliminated in the quarterfinals by the New Orleans Pelicans.

The team failed to improve on their 48–34 record from the previous season, finishing 46-36 and as the 9th seed in the Western Conference. They advanced to the play-in tournament, defeating the 10th-seeded Golden State in the first stage of the Play-In Tournament, but fell to the 8th-seeded New Orleans Pelicans in the second stage to end their season.

The Sacramento Kings drew an average home attendance of 17,927 in 41 home games in the 2023-24 NBA season.

== Draft picks ==
| Round | Pick | Player | Position | Nationality | College / Club |
|---|---|---|---|---|---|
| 1 | 24 | Olivier-Maxence Prosper | SF/PF | Canada | Marquette (Jr.) |
| 2 | 38 | Jordan Walsh | SF | United States | Arkansas (Fr.) |
| 2 | 54 | Jalen Slawson | SF | United States | Furman (Sr.) |

The Kings had one first-round pick and two second-round picks entering the draft. All picks are the Kings' own, except the 38th pick, which was conveyed from the Indiana Pacers as part of the 2022 Tyrese Haliburton-for-Domantas Sabonis trade after falling outside its protected 56th-to-60th range.

== Roster ==
2023–24 Sacramento Kings roster
Players

| Pos. | No. | Player | Height | Weight | DOB | From |
|---|---|---|---|---|---|---|
| F | 40 | Harrison Barnes | 6 ft 8 in (2.03 m) | 225 lb (102 kg) | 1992-05-30 | North Carolina |
| G | 3 | Chris Duarte | 6 ft 5 in (1.96 m) | 190 lb (86 kg) | 1997-06-13 | Oregon |
| F | 17 | Kessler Edwards | 6 ft 7 in (2.01 m) | 203 lb (92 kg) | 2000-08-09 | Pepperdine |
| G | 23 | Keon Ellis | 6 ft 3 in (1.91 m) | 167 lb (76 kg) | 2000-01-08 | Alabama |
| G | 31 | Jordan Ford (TW) | 6 ft 1 in (1.85 m) | 175 lb (79 kg) | 1998-05-26 | Saint Mary's |
| G | 5 | De'Aaron Fox | 6 ft 3 in (1.91 m) | 185 lb (84 kg) | 1997-12-20 | Kentucky |
| G/F | 9 | Kevin Huerter (injured) | 6 ft 7 in (2.01 m) | 198 lb (90 kg) | 1998-08-27 | Maryland |
| G | 20 | Colby Jones | 6 ft 6 in (1.98 m) | 207 lb (94 kg) | 2002-05-28 | Xavier |
| G | 8 | Mason Jones (TW) | 6 ft 4 in (1.93 m) | 200 lb (91 kg) | 1998-07-21 | Arkansas |
| C | 25 | Alex Len | 7 ft 0 in (2.13 m) | 250 lb (113 kg) | 1993-06-16 | Maryland |
| F | 41 | Trey Lyles | 6 ft 9 in (2.06 m) | 234 lb (106 kg) | 1995-11-05 | Kentucky |
| C | 00 | JaVale McGee | 7 ft 0 in (2.13 m) | 270 lb (122 kg) | 1988-01-19 | Nevada |
| G | 15 | Davion Mitchell | 6 ft 0 in (1.83 m) | 202 lb (92 kg) | 1998-09-05 | Baylor |
| G | 0 | Malik Monk (injured) | 6 ft 3 in (1.91 m) | 200 lb (91 kg) | 1998-02-04 | Kentucky |
| F | 13 | Keegan Murray | 6 ft 8 in (2.03 m) | 215 lb (98 kg) | 2000-08-19 | Iowa |
| F/C | 10 | Domantas Sabonis | 6 ft 10 in (2.08 m) | 240 lb (109 kg) | 1996-05-03 | Gonzaga |
| F | 18 | Jalen Slawson (TW) | 6 ft 7 in (2.01 m) | 215 lb (98 kg) | 1999-10-22 | Furman |
| F | 7 | Sasha Vezenkov | 6 ft 9 in (2.06 m) | 225 lb (102 kg) | 1995-08-06 | Bulgaria |

Coaches
Head coach
- Mike Brown
Assistant(s)
- Leandro Barbosa
- Doug Christie
- Deividas Dulkys
- Jordi Fernández (associate HC)
- Dutch Gaitley
- Luke Loucks
- Jay Triano

Legend
- (DP) Unsigned draft pick
- (FA) Free agent
- (S) Suspended
- (GL) On assignment to G League affiliate
- (TW) Two-way affiliate player
- Injured

Roster
Updated: April 22, 2024

== Standings ==
=== Division ===
| Pacific Division | W | L | PCT | GB | Home | Road | Div | GP |
|---|---|---|---|---|---|---|---|---|
| y – Los Angeles Clippers | 51 | 31 | .622 | – | 25‍–‍16 | 26‍–‍15 | 9‍–‍7 | 82 |
| x – Phoenix Suns | 49 | 33 | .598 | 2.0 | 25‍–‍16 | 24‍–‍17 | 9‍–‍9 | 82 |
| x – Los Angeles Lakers | 47 | 35 | .573 | 4.0 | 28‍–‍14 | 19‍–‍21 | 7‍–‍10 | 82 |
| pi – Sacramento Kings | 46 | 36 | .561 | 5.0 | 24‍–‍17 | 22‍–‍19 | 10‍–‍7 | 82 |
| pi – Golden State Warriors | 46 | 36 | .561 | 5.0 | 21‍–‍20 | 25‍–‍16 | 7‍–‍9 | 82 |

=== Conference ===
Western Conference
| # | Team | W | L | PCT | GB | GP |
|---|---|---|---|---|---|---|
| 1 | c – Oklahoma City Thunder * | 57 | 25 | .695 | – | 82 |
| 2 | x – Denver Nuggets | 57 | 25 | .695 | – | 82 |
| 3 | x – Minnesota Timberwolves | 56 | 26 | .683 | 1.0 | 82 |
| 4 | y – Los Angeles Clippers * | 51 | 31 | .622 | 6.0 | 82 |
| 5 | y – Dallas Mavericks * | 50 | 32 | .610 | 7.0 | 82 |
| 6 | x – Phoenix Suns | 49 | 33 | .598 | 8.0 | 82 |
| 7 | x – New Orleans Pelicans | 49 | 33 | .598 | 8.0 | 82 |
| 8 | x – Los Angeles Lakers | 47 | 35 | .573 | 10.0 | 82 |
| 9 | pi – Sacramento Kings | 46 | 36 | .561 | 11.0 | 82 |
| 10 | pi – Golden State Warriors | 46 | 36 | .561 | 11.0 | 82 |
| 11 | Houston Rockets | 41 | 41 | .500 | 16.0 | 82 |
| 12 | Utah Jazz | 31 | 51 | .378 | 26.0 | 82 |
| 13 | Memphis Grizzlies | 27 | 55 | .329 | 30.0 | 82 |
| 14 | San Antonio Spurs | 22 | 60 | .268 | 35.0 | 82 |
| 15 | Portland Trail Blazers | 21 | 61 | .256 | 36.0 | 82 |

== Game log ==
=== Preseason ===
2023 preseason game log
Total: 1–4 (Home: 1–1; Road: 0–3)
Preseason: 1–4 (home: 1–1; road: 0–3)

| Game | Date | Team | Score | High points | High rebounds | High assists | Location Attendance | Record |
|---|---|---|---|---|---|---|---|---|
| 1 | October 8 | @ Toronto | L 99–112 | Sasha Vezenkov (12) | Domantas Sabonis (6) | Domantas Sabonis (6) | (Canada) Rogers Arena; 18,654 | 0–1 |
| 2 | October 11 | @ L.A. Lakers | L 101–109 | De'Aaron Fox (18) | Domantas Sabonis (16) | Fox, Sabonis (5) | Honda Center; 10,830 | 0–2 |
| 3 | October 15 | Golden State | L 115–121 (OT) | Domantas Sabonis (19) | Domantas Sabonis (11) | De'Aaron Fox (6) | Golden 1 Center; 17,884 | 0–3 |
| 4 | October 18 | @ Golden State | L 115–116 | De'Aaron Fox (25) | Domantas Sabonis (10) | Domantas Sabonis (8) | Chase Center; 18,064 | 0–4 |
| 5 | October 19 | Utah | W 116–113 | Malik Monk (23) | Kessler Edwards (8) | Malik Monk (8) | Golden 1 Center; 15,726 | 1–4 |

2023–24 preseason schedule

=== Regular season ===
2023–24 game log
Total: 46–36 (Home: 24–17; Road: 22–19)
October: 2–1 (home: 1–1; road: 1–0)

| Game | Date | Team | Score | High points | High rebounds | High assists | Location Attendance | Record |
|---|---|---|---|---|---|---|---|---|
| 1 | October 25 | @ Utah | W 130–114 | Harrison Barnes (33) | Domantas Sabonis (12) | Malik Monk (7) | Delta Center; 18,206 | 1–0 |
| 2 | October 27 | Golden State | L 114–122 | De'Aaron Fox (39) | Domantas Sabonis (18) | Domantas Sabonis (7) | Golden 1 Center; 18,250 | 1–1 |
| 3 | October 29 | L.A. Lakers | W 132–127 (OT) | De'Aaron Fox (37) | Domantas Sabonis (15) | De'Aaron Fox (8) | Golden 1 Center; 18,198 | 2–1 |

November: 8–6 (home: 4–1; road: 4–5)

| Game | Date | Team | Score | High points | High rebounds | High assists | Location Attendance | Record |
|---|---|---|---|---|---|---|---|---|
| 4 | November 1 | @ Golden State | L 101–102 | Domantas Sabonis (23) | Domantas Sabonis (11) | Domantas Sabonis (8) | Chase Center; 18,064 | 2–2 |
| 5 | November 4 | @ Houston | L 89–107 | Malik Monk (18) | Domantas Sabonis (15) | Malik Monk (7) | Toyota Center; 18,055 | 2–3 |
| 6 | November 6 | @ Houston | L 97–122 | Keon Ellis (15) | Domantas Sabonis (8) | Domantas Sabonis (5) | Toyota Center; 15,130 | 2–4 |
| 7 | November 8 | Portland | W 121–118 (OT) | Domantas Sabonis (27) | Domantas Sabonis (11) | Malik Monk (10) | Golden 1 Center; 17,829 | 3–4 |
| 8 | November 10 | Oklahoma City | W 105–98 | Kevin Huerter (28) | Domantas Sabonis (13) | Domantas Sabonis (13) | Golden 1 Center; 18,097 | 4–4 |
| 9 | November 13 | Cleveland | W 132–120 | De'Aaron Fox (28) | Domantas Sabonis (9) | Domantas Sabonis (10) | Golden 1 Center; 17,829 | 5–4 |
| 10 | November 15 | @ L.A. Lakers | W 125–110 | Domantas Sabonis (29) | Domantas Sabonis (16) | Huerter, Sabonis (7) | Crypto.com Arena; 18,687 | 6–4 |
| 11 | November 17 | @ San Antonio | W 129–120 | De'Aaron Fox (43) | Domantas Sabonis (14) | Malik Monk (8) | Frost Bank Center; 18,354 | 7–4 |
| 12 | November 19 | @ Dallas | W 129–113 | Domantas Sabonis (32) | Domantas Sabonis (13) | De'Aaron Fox (7) | American Airlines Center; 20,211 | 8–4 |
| 13 | November 20 | @ New Orleans | L 93–129 | Harrison Barnes (16) | Domantas Sabonis (10) | Mitchell, Sabonis (8) | Smoothie King Center; 16,004 | 8–5 |
| 14 | November 22 | @ New Orleans | L 112–117 | De'Aaron Fox (26) | Domantas Sabonis (9) | Domantas Sabonis (6) | Smoothie King Center; 16,012 | 8–6 |
| 15 | November 24 | @ Minnesota | W 124–111 | De'Aaron Fox (36) | Domantas Sabonis (11) | De'Aaron Fox (12) | Target Center; 18,024 | 9–6 |
| 16 | November 28 | Golden State | W 124–123 | De'Aaron Fox (29) | Fox, Huerter (9) | Domantas Sabonis (10) | Golden 1 Center; 18,039 | 10–6 |
| 17 | November 29 | L.A. Clippers | L 117–131 | De'Aaron Fox (40) | seven players (5) | Kevin Huerter (5) | Golden 1 Center; 17,829 | 10–7 |

December: 9–5 (home: 6–3; road: 3–2)

| Game | Date | Team | Score | High points | High rebounds | High assists | Location Attendance | Record |
|---|---|---|---|---|---|---|---|---|
| 18 | December 2 | Denver | W 123–117 | Fox, Monk (26) | Domantas Sabonis (15) | De'Aaron Fox (16) | Golden 1 Center; 17,829 | 11–7 |
| 19 | December 4 | New Orleans | L 117–127 | De'Aaron Fox (30) | Domantas Sabonis (13) | Domantas Sabonis (10) | Golden 1 Center; 18,048 | 11–8 |
| 20 | December 8 | @ Phoenix | W 114–106 | De'Aaron Fox (34) | Domantas Sabonis (17) | De'Aaron Fox (7) | Footprint Center; 17,071 | 12–8 |
| 21 | December 11 | Brooklyn | W 131–118 | De'Aaron Fox (29) | Domantas Sabonis (16) | Monk, Sabonis (9) | Golden 1 Center; 17,794 | 13–8 |
| 22 | December 12 | @ L.A. Clippers | L 99–119 | Keegan Murray (17) | Domantas Sabonis (10) | Malik Monk (5) | Crypto.com Arena; 17,060 | 13–9 |
| 23 | December 14 | Oklahoma City | W 128–123 | De'Aaron Fox (41) | Domantas Sabonis (16) | Malik Monk (9) | Golden 1 Center; 17,794 | 14–9 |
| 24 | December 16 | Utah | W 125–104 | Keegan Murray (47) | Domantas Sabonis (10) | Monk, Sabonis (8) | Golden 1 Center; 17,794 | 15–9 |
| 25 | December 18 | Washington | W 143–131 | De'Aaron Fox (30) | Domantas Sabonis (13) | Domantas Sabonis (12) | Golden 1 Center; 17,794 | 16–9 |
| 26 | December 20 | Boston | L 119–144 | De'Aaron Fox (29) | Domantas Sabonis (10) | Domantas Sabonis (8) | Golden 1 Center; 17,874 | 16–10 |
| 27 | December 22 | Phoenix | W 120–105 | Domantas Sabonis (28) | Domantas Sabonis (11) | Domantas Sabonis (12) | Golden 1 Center; 17,794 | 17–10 |
| 28 | December 23 | Minnesota | L 98–110 | De'Aaron Fox (27) | Domantas Sabonis (10) | Domantas Sabonis (10) | Golden 1 Center; 17,983 | 17–11 |
| 29 | December 26 | @ Portland | L 113–130 | De'Aaron Fox (43) | Domantas Sabonis (12) | Domantas Sabonis (5) | Moda Center; 18,585 | 17–12 |
| 30 | December 29 | @ Atlanta | W 117–110 | De'Aaron Fox (31) | Domantas Sabonis (10) | Fox, Monk (8) | State Farm Arena; 18,305 | 18–12 |
| 31 | December 31 | @ Memphis | W 123–92 | Malik Monk (27) | Domantas Sabonis (21) | Domantas Sabonis (12) | FedExForum; 17,794 | 19–12 |

January: 8–7 (home: 3–3; road: 5–4)

| Game | Date | Team | Score | High points | High rebounds | High assists | Location Attendance | Record |
|---|---|---|---|---|---|---|---|---|
| 32 | January 2 | Charlotte | L 104–111 | De'Aaron Fox (30) | Domantas Sabonis (19) | De'Aaron Fox (6) | Golden 1 Center; 17,983 | 19–13 |
| 33 | January 3 | Orlando | W 138–135 (2OT) | Malik Monk (37) | Domantas Sabonis (23) | Domantas Sabonis (12) | Golden 1 Center; 17,832 | 20–13 |
| 34 | January 5 | Toronto | W 135–130 | Fox, Sabonis (24) | Domantas Sabonis (15) | Domantas Sabonis (11) | Golden 1 Center; 17,941 | 21–13 |
| 35 | January 7 | New Orleans | L 100–133 | Huerter, Sabonis (17) | Domantas Sabonis (10) | Domantas Sabonis (6) | Golden 1 Center; 17,832 | 21–14 |
| 36 | January 9 | @ Detroit | W 131–110 | Domantas Sabonis (37) | Domantas Sabonis (10) | Domantas Sabonis (13) | Little Caesars Arena; 13,992 | 22–14 |
| 37 | January 10 | @ Charlotte | W 123–98 | Keegan Murray (25) | Sabonis, Len (10) | Domantas Sabonis (7) | Spectrum Center; 14,173 | 23–14 |
| 38 | January 12 | @ Philadelphia | L 93–112 | De'Aaron Fox (21) | Domantas Sabonis (12) | Domantas Sabonis (5) | Wells Fargo Center; 19,766 | 23–15 |
| 39 | January 14 | @ Milwaukee | L 142–143 (OT) | De'Aaron Fox (32) | Domantas Sabonis (13) | Domantas Sabonis (15) | Fiserv Forum; 17,612 | 23–16 |
| 40 | January 16 | @ Phoenix | L 117–119 | De'Aaron Fox (33) | Domantas Sabonis (12) | Domantas Sabonis (11) | Footprint Center; 17,071 | 23–17 |
| 41 | January 18 | Indiana | L 121–126 | Kevin Huerter (31) | Domantas Sabonis (11) | Domantas Sabonis (10) | Golden 1 Center; 17,832 | 23–18 |
| 42 | January 22 | Atlanta | W 122–107 | Harrison Barnes (32) | Domantas Sabonis (21) | Malik Monk (8) | Golden 1 Center; 17,832 | 24–18 |
| 43 | January 25 | @ Golden State | W 134–133 | Harrison Barnes (39) | Kevin Huerter (10) | Domantas Sabonis (13) | Chase Center; 18,064 | 25–18 |
| 44 | January 27 | @ Dallas | W 120–115 | De'Aaron Fox (34) | Domantas Sabonis (11) | Malik Monk (6) | American Airlines Center; 20,373 | 26–18 |
| 45 | January 29 | @ Memphis | W 103–94 | De'Aaron Fox (23) | Domantas Sabonis (26) | Monk, Sabonis (5) | FedExForum; 15,333 | 27–18 |
| 46 | January 31 | @ Miami | L 106–115 | Keegan Murray (33) | Domantas Sabonis (17) | Domantas Sabonis (13) | Kaseya Center; 19,600 | 27–19 |

February: 6–6 (home: 2–2; road: 4–4)

| Game | Date | Team | Score | High points | High rebounds | High assists | Location Attendance | Record |
|---|---|---|---|---|---|---|---|---|
| 47 | February 2 | @ Indiana | W 133–122 | Domantas Sabonis (26) | Domantas Sabonis (11) | Domantas Sabonis (7) | Gainbridge Fieldhouse; 17,274 | 28–19 |
| 48 | February 3 | @ Chicago | W 123–115 | De'Aaron Fox (41) | Domantas Sabonis (14) | Domantas Sabonis (10) | United Center; 21,579 | 29–19 |
| 49 | February 5 | @ Cleveland | L 110–136 | Harrison Barnes (22) | Domantas Sabonis (19) | Domantas Sabonis (15) | Rocket Mortgage FieldHouse; 19,432 | 29–20 |
| 50 | February 7 | Detroit | L 120–133 | Domantas Sabonis (30) | Domantas Sabonis (12) | Malik Monk (10) | Golden 1 Center; 17,832 | 29–21 |
| 51 | February 9 | Denver | W 135–106 | Malik Monk (23) | Domantas Sabonis (17) | Fox, Sabonis (10) | Golden 1 Center; 17,832 | 30–21 |
| 52 | February 11 | @ Oklahoma City | L 113–127 | Malik Monk (26) | Domantas Sabonis (11) | Domantas Sabonis (14) | Paycom Center; 17,092 | 30–22 |
| 53 | February 13 | @ Phoenix | L 125–130 | De'Aaron Fox (40) | Domantas Sabonis (18) | Domantas Sabonis (12) | Footprint Center; 17,071 | 30–23 |
| 54 | February 14 | @ Denver | W 102–98 | De'Aaron Fox (30) | Domantas Sabonis (13) | De'Aaron Fox (8) | Ball Arena; 19,617 | 31–23 |
All-Star Game
| 55 | February 22 | San Antonio | W 127–122 | De'Aaron Fox (28) | Domantas Sabonis (11) | Domantas Sabonis (11) | Golden 1 Center; 18,153 | 32–23 |
| 56 | February 25 | @ L.A. Clippers | W 123–107 | De'Aaron Fox (33) | Domantas Sabonis (15) | Domantas Sabonis (12) | Crypto.com Arena; 19,370 | 33–23 |
| 57 | February 26 | Miami | L 110–121 | Keegan Murray (28) | Domantas Sabonis (14) | Domantas Sabonis (10) | Golden 1 Center; 17,832 | 33–24 |
| 58 | February 28 | @ Denver | L 96–117 | Keegan Murray (21) | Domantas Sabonis (10) | Domantas Sabonis (7) | Ball Arena; 19,628 | 33–25 |

March: 10–6 (home: 6–5; road: 4–1)

| Game | Date | Team | Score | High points | High rebounds | High assists | Location Attendance | Record |
|---|---|---|---|---|---|---|---|---|
| 59 | March 1 | @ Minnesota | W 124–120 (OT) | Malik Monk (39) | Domantas Sabonis (15) | Domantas Sabonis (8) | Target Center; 18,024 | 34–25 |
| 60 | March 4 | Chicago | L 109–113 | De'Aaron Fox (20) | Domantas Sabonis (21) | De'Aaron Fox (10) | Golden 1 Center; 17,832 | 34–26 |
| 61 | March 6 | @ L.A. Lakers | W 130–120 | De'Aaron Fox (44) | Domantas Sabonis (20) | Domantas Sabonis (12) | Crypto.com Arena; 18,498 | 35–26 |
| 62 | March 7 | San Antonio | W 131–129 | De'Aaron Fox (33) | Domantas Sabonis (17) | Sabonis, Monk (9) | Golden 1 Center; 17,968 | 36–26 |
| 63 | March 10 | Houston | L 104–112 | Domantas Sabonis (25) | Domantas Sabonis (15) | Domantas Sabonis (8) | Golden 1 Center; 18,022 | 36–27 |
| 64 | March 12 | Milwaukee | W 129–94 | De'Aaron Fox (29) | Domantas Sabonis (11) | Domantas Sabonis (8) | Golden 1 Center; 17,832 | 37–27 |
| 65 | March 13 | L.A. Lakers | W 120–107 | Harrison Barnes (23) | Domantas Sabonis (19) | Domantas Sabonis (10) | Golden 1 Center; 18,332 | 38–27 |
| 66 | March 16 | New York | L 91–98 | Domantas Sabonis (21) | Domantas Sabonis (14) | De'Aaron Fox (9) | Golden 1 Center; 18,311 | 38–28 |
| 67 | March 18 | Memphis | W 121–111 (OT) | Malik Monk (28) | Domantas Sabonis (18) | De'Aaron Fox (10) | Golden 1 Center; 17,832 | 39–28 |
| 68 | March 20 | @ Toronto | W 123–89 | De'Aaron Fox (20) | Domantas Sabonis (17) | Domantas Sabonis (10) | Scotiabank Arena; 18,641 | 40–28 |
| 69 | March 21 | @ Washington | L 102–109 | De'Aaron Fox (25) | Domantas Sabonis (14) | Domantas Sabonis (6) | Capital One Arena; 14,495 | 40–29 |
| 70 | March 23 | @ Orlando | W 109–107 | De'Aaron Fox (31) | Domantas Sabonis (14) | Domantas Sabonis (8) | Kia Center; 18,307 | 41–29 |
| 71 | March 25 | Philadelphia | W 108–96 | Murray, Fox (23) | Domantas Sabonis (13) | Domantas Sabonis (10) | Golden 1 Center; 17,832 | 42–29 |
| 72 | March 26 | Dallas | L 96–132 | De'Aaron Fox (18) | Domantas Sabonis (11) | Domantas Sabonis (9) | Golden 1 Center; 17,832 | 42–30 |
| 73 | March 29 | Dallas | L 103–107 | De'Aaron Fox (23) | Domantas Sabonis (12) | Domantas Sabonis (10) | Golden 1 Center; 17,832 | 42–31 |
| 74 | March 31 | Utah | W 127–106 | Keegan Murray (25) | Domantas Sabonis (11) | De'Aaron Fox (12) | Golden 1 Center; 18,332 | 43–31 |

April: 3–5 (home: 2–2; road: 1–3)

| Game | Date | Team | Score | High points | High rebounds | High assists | Location Attendance | Record |
|---|---|---|---|---|---|---|---|---|
| 75 | April 2 | L.A. Clippers | W 109–95 | Domantas Sabonis (22) | Domantas Sabonis (20) | Domantas Sabonis (9) | Golden 1 Center; 17,832 | 44–31 |
| 76 | April 4 | @ New York | L 109–120 | De'Aaron Fox (29) | Domantas Sabonis (11) | Fox, Sabonis (7) | Madison Square Garden; 19,812 | 44–32 |
| 77 | April 5 | @ Boston | L 100–101 | De'Aaron Fox (40) | Domantas Sabonis (16) | Domantas Sabonis (6) | TD Garden; 19,156 | 44–33 |
| 78 | April 7 | @ Brooklyn | W 107–77 | De'Aaron Fox (20) | Domantas Sabonis (20) | Domantas Sabonis (9) | Barclays Center; 17,732 | 45–33 |
| 79 | April 9 | @ Oklahoma City | L 105–112 | De'Aaron Fox (33) | Domantas Sabonis (13) | De'Aaron Fox (6) | Paycom Center; 17,509 | 45–34 |
| 80 | April 11 | New Orleans | L 123–135 | De'Aaron Fox (33) | Domantas Sabonis (10) | De'Aaron Fox (8) | Golden 1 Center; 17,832 | 45–35 |
| 81 | April 12 | Phoenix | L 107–108 | Domantas Sabonis (25) | Domantas Sabonis (12) | Domantas Sabonis (9) | Golden 1 Center; 17,832 | 45–36 |
| 82 | April 14 | Portland | W 121–82 | De'Aaron Fox (24) | Domantas Sabonis (11) | Domantas Sabonis (9) | Golden 1 Center; 18,037 | 46–36 |

2023–24 season schedule

=== Play-in ===
2024 play-in game log
Total: 1–1 (Home: 1–0; Road: 0–1)
Play-in: 1–1 (home: 1–0; road: 0–1)

| Game | Date | Team | Score | High points | High rebounds | High assists | Location Attendance | Record |
|---|---|---|---|---|---|---|---|---|
| 1 | April 16 | Golden State | W 118–94 | Keegan Murray (32) | Domantas Sabonis (12) | Domantas Sabonis (7) | Golden 1 Center; 18,304 | 1–0 |
| 2 | April 19 | @ New Orleans | L 98–105 | De'Aaron Fox (35) | Domantas Sabonis (14) | Domantas Sabonis (7) | Smoothie King Center; 18,656 | 1–1 |

2023–24 season schedule

=== In-Season Tournament ===
This was the first regular season where all the NBA teams competed in a mid-season tournament setting due to the implementation of the 2023 NBA In-Season Tournament. During the in-season tournament period, the Kings competed in Group C of the Western Conference, which included the Golden State Warriors, Minnesota Timberwolves, Oklahoma City Thunder, and San Antonio Spurs. The Kings advanced to the knockout round of the In-Season Tournament following their victories over the Thunder, Spurs, Timberwolves (who held the best record of the entire Western Conference at the time), and Warriors (who won by one with a Malik Monk game-winner after coming back from a 24-point deficit during that match). However, when entering the knockout round section of the In-Season Tournament on December 4, the Kings lost to the winners of Group B (which were the New Orleans Pelicans, who finished 3–1 in their group at the time) by a final score of 127-117 due to New Orleans winning the rest of the quarters that night after losing the first quarter by 1 point. Tragically, during that night, a 34-year-old Kings fan named Gregorio "Greg" Florez Breedlove had a medical emergency during the first quarter of that game and died 20 minutes after emergency medical services arrived to try and help him out.

==== West group C ====
| Pos | Team | Pld | W | L | PF | PA | PD | Qualification | SAC | MIN | GSW | OKC | SAS |
|---|---|---|---|---|---|---|---|---|---|---|---|---|---|
| 1 | Sacramento Kings | 4 | 4 | 0 | 482 | 452 | +30 | Advance to knockout stage | — | 124–111 | 124–123 | 105–98 | 129–120 |
| 2 | Minnesota Timberwolves | 4 | 3 | 1 | 438 | 438 | 0 | | 111–124 | — | 104–101 | 106–103 | 117–110 |
| 3 | Golden State Warriors | 4 | 2 | 2 | 483 | 479 | +4 | | 123–124 | 101–104 | — | 141–139 | 118–112 |
| 4 | Oklahoma City Thunder | 4 | 1 | 3 | 463 | 439 | +24 | | 98–105 | 103–106 | 139–141 | — | 123–87 |
| 5 | San Antonio Spurs | 4 | 0 | 4 | 429 | 487 | −58 | | 120–129 | 110–117 | 112–118 | 87–123 | — |

Source: NBA
Rules for classification: Tiebreakers

== Player statistics ==
Legend
| GP | Games played | GS | Games started | MPG | Minutes per game |
| FG% | Field-goal percentage | 3P% | 3-point field-goal percentage | FT% | Free-throw percentage |
| RPG | Rebounds per game | APG | Assists per game | SPG | Steals per game |
| BPG | Blocks per game | PPG | Points per game |

=== Regular season ===
Sacramento Kings statistics
| Player | GP | GS | MPG | FG% | 3P% | FT% | RPG | APG | SPG | BPG | PPG |
|---|---|---|---|---|---|---|---|---|---|---|---|
| Harrison Barnes | 82 | 82 | 29.0 | .474 | .387 | .801 | 3.0 | 1.2 | .7 | .1 | 12.2 |
| Chris Duarte | 59 | 11 | 12.2 | .381 | .346 | .788 | 1.8 | .7 | .5 | .1 | 3.9 |
| Kessler Edwards | 54 | 0 | 5.1 | .415 | .385 | .556 | .8 | .3 | .2 | .1 | 1.7 |
| Keon Ellis | 57 | 21 | 17.2 | .461 | .417 | .743 | 2.2 | 1.5 | .9 | .5 | 5.4 |
| Jordan Ford | 6 | 0 | 3.7 | .571 | .667 | 1.000 | .3 | .3 | .0 | .0 | 2.0 |
| De'Aaron Fox | 74 | 74 | 35.9 | .465 | .369 | .738 | 4.6 | 5.6 | 2.0 | .4 | 26.6 |
| Kevin Huerter | 64 | 59 | 24.4 | .443 | .361 | .766 | 3.5 | 2.6 | .7 | .4 | 10.2 |
| Colby Jones | 30 | 0 | 6.4 | .394 | .091 | .545 | 1.3 | .7 | .2 | .2 | 2.1 |
| Mason Jones | 5 | 0 | 5.6 | .250 | .286 | .500 | 1.0 | 1.0 | .2 | .0 | 1.4 |
| Alex Len | 48 | 0 | 9.3 | .617 | .000 | .588 | 2.7 | 1.0 | .2 | .7 | 2.5 |
| Trey Lyles | 58 | 0 | 20.0 | .445 | .384 | .700 | 4.4 | 1.2 | .3 | .3 | 7.2 |
| JaVale McGee | 46 | 0 | 7.4 | .598 | .143 | .578 | 2.7 | .4 | .3 | .4 | 4.0 |
| Davion Mitchell | 72 | 4 | 15.3 | .452 | .361 | .714 | 1.3 | 1.9 | .2 | .0 | 5.3 |
| Malik Monk | 72 | 0 | 26.0 | .443 | .350 | .829 | 2.9 | 5.1 | .6 | .5 | 15.4 |
| Keegan Murray | 77 | 77 | 33.6 | .454 | .358 | .831 | 5.5 | 1.7 | 1.0 | .8 | 15.2 |
| Filip Petrušev^{†} | 2 | 0 | 3.5 | .500 | | .500 | .0 | .0 | .0 | .0 | 1.5 |
| Domantas Sabonis | 82 | 82 | 35.7 | .594 | .379 | .704 | 13.7 | 8.2 | .9 | .6 | 19.4 |
| Jalen Slawson | 12 | 0 | 3.1 | .667 | .000 | | .6 | .2 | .1 | .1 | .7 |
| Juan Toscano-Anderson | 11 | 0 | 4.8 | .250 | .250 | | 1.3 | .4 | .1 | .1 | .6 |
| Aleksandar Vezenkov | 42 | 0 | 12.2 | .440 | .375 | .800 | 2.3 | .5 | .5 | .2 | 5.4 |

- ^{†} Denotes player spent time with another team in the season. Stats reflect time with the Kings only.

== Transactions ==
=== Trades ===
| June 28, 2023 | To Sacramento Kings Draft rights to Colby Jones (No. 34) | To Boston Celtics Draft rights to Jordan Walsh (No. 38); 2024 DAL second-round pick |
| July 6, 2023 | To Sacramento Kings Chris Duarte | To Indiana Pacers 2028 DAL second round pick 2030 SAC second round pick |
| July 6, 2023 | To Sacramento Kings Cash considerations | To Dallas Mavericks Richaun Holmes; Draft rights to Olivier-Maxence Prosper (No. 24) |

=== Free agency ===
==== Re-signed ====
| Date | Player | Ref. |
|---|---|---|
| June 29 | Harrison Barnes | |
| June 30 | Trey Lyles | |
| July 2 | Domantas Sabonis | |
| July 2 | Alex Len | |

==== Additions ====
| Date | Player | Former Team | Ref. |
|---|---|---|---|
| July 1 | Sasha Vezenkov | Olympiacos | |

==== Subtractions ====
| Player | Reason | New Team | Ref. |
|---|---|---|---|
| Chimezie Metu | Free agency | Phoenix Suns | |
