= 2023–24 Brooklyn Nets season =

- Head coach: Jacque Vaughn (fired); Kevin Ollie (interim)
- General manager: Sean Marks
- Owner: Joseph Tsai
- Arena: Barclays Center

Results
- Record: 32–50 (.390)
- Place: Division: 4th (Atlantic); Conference: 11th (Eastern)
- Playoff finish: Did not qualify
- Stats at Basketball Reference

Local media
- Television: YES Network; WWOR-TV (4 games)
- Radio: WFAN-AM • WFAN-FM

The 2023–24 Brooklyn Nets season was the 48th season of the franchise in the National Basketball Association (NBA), 57th season overall, and its 12th season playing in the New York City borough of Brooklyn.

The Nets fired head coach Jacque Vaughn on February 19 after two seasons with the team, days after the team suffered a 50-point loss to the Boston Celtics. The Nets were eliminated from postseason contention for the first time since 2018 on April 3, following the Atlanta Hawks' win over the Detroit Pistons.

The Brooklyn Nets drew an average home attendance of 17,568 in 41 home games in the 2023-24 NBA season. The total attendance was 720,291.

== Draft ==
Round	Pick	Player	Position(s)	Nationality	College / Club
1	21	Noah Clowney	F	United States	Alabama
1	22	Dariq Whitehead	G	United States	Duke
2	51	Jalen Wilson	F	United States	Kansas

The Nets had two first round picks and one second round pick in this draft. Their 21st selection came from the Phoenix Suns as a result of the Kevin Durant trade during the 2022–23 season.

== Roster ==
Brooklyn Nets roster
Players

Pos.	No.	Player	Height	Weight	DOB	From
F	13	Keita Bates-Diop (injured)	6 ft 8 in (2.03 m)	229 lb (104 kg)	1996-01-23	Ohio State
G/F	1	Mikal Bridges	6 ft 6 in (1.98 m)	209 lb (95 kg)	1996-08-30	Villanova
F/C	33	Nic Claxton	6 ft 11 in (2.11 m)	215 lb (98 kg)	1999-04-17	Georgia
F	21	Noah Clowney	6 ft 10 in (2.08 m)	210 lb (95 kg)	2004-07-14	Alabama
F	28	Dorian Finney-Smith (injured)	6 ft 7 in (2.01 m)	220 lb (100 kg)	1993-05-04	Florida
G	14	Jacob Gilyard (TW)	5 ft 8 in (1.73 m)	160 lb (73 kg)	1998-07-14	Richmond
F	2	Cameron Johnson	6 ft 8 in (2.03 m)	210 lb (95 kg)	1996-03-03	North Carolina
G	45	Keon Johnson (TW)	6 ft 5 in (1.96 m)	185 lb (84 kg)	2002-03-10	Tennessee
F	16	Jaylen Martin (TW)	6 ft 5 in (1.96 m)	216 lb (98 kg)	2004-01-28	FSUS (FL)
G	17	Dennis Schröder	6 ft 3 in (1.91 m)	175 lb (79 kg)	1993-09-15	Germany
C	20	Day'Ron Sharpe	6 ft 10 in (2.08 m)	265 lb (120 kg)	2001-11-06	North Carolina
G/F	10	Ben Simmons (injured)	6 ft 10 in (2.08 m)	240 lb (109 kg)	1996-07-20	LSU
G	4	Dennis Smith Jr.	6 ft 2 in (1.88 m)	205 lb (93 kg)	1997-11-25	NC State
G	24	Cam Thomas	6 ft 3 in (1.91 m)	210 lb (95 kg)	2001-10-13	LSU
G	8	Lonnie Walker IV	6 ft 4 in (1.93 m)	204 lb (93 kg)	1998-12-14	Miami (FL)
F	9	Trendon Watford	6 ft 8 in (2.03 m)	237 lb (108 kg)	2000-11-09	LSU
F	0	Dariq Whitehead (injured)	6 ft 7 in (2.01 m)	220 lb (100 kg)	2004-08-01	Duke
F	22	Jalen Wilson	6 ft 8 in (2.03 m)	225 lb (102 kg)	2000-11-04	Kansas

Coaches
Head coach
- Kevin Ollie (interim)
Assistant(s)
- Ronnie Burrell
- Adam Caporn
- Ryan Forehan-Kelly
- Trevor Hendry
- Jay Hernandez
- Corey Vinson
- Will Weaver

Legend
- (DP) Unsigned draft pick
- (FA) Free agent
- (S) Suspended
- (GL) On assignment to G League affiliate
- (TW) Two-way affiliate player
- Injured

Roster
Updated: April 22, 2024

== Standings ==
=== Division ===
Atlantic Division	W	L	PCT	GB	Home	Road	Div	GP
z – Boston Celtics	64	18	.780	–	37‍–‍4	27‍–‍14	15‍–‍2	82
x – New York Knicks	50	32	.610	14.0	27‍–‍14	23‍–‍18	12‍–‍5	82
x – Philadelphia 76ers	47	35	.573	17.0	25‍–‍16	22‍–‍19	8‍–‍8	82
Brooklyn Nets	32	50	.390	32.0	20‍–‍21	12‍–‍29	5‍–‍11	82
Toronto Raptors	25	57	.305	39.0	14‍–‍27	11‍–‍30	1‍–‍15	82

=== Conference ===
Eastern Conference
#	Team	W	L	PCT	GB	GP
1	z – Boston Celtics *	64	18	.780	–	82
2	x – New York Knicks	50	32	.610	14.0	82
3	y – Milwaukee Bucks *	49	33	.598	15.0	82
4	x – Cleveland Cavaliers	48	34	.585	16.0	82
5	y – Orlando Magic *	47	35	.573	17.0	82
6	x – Indiana Pacers	47	35	.573	17.0	82
7	x – Philadelphia 76ers	47	35	.573	17.0	82
8	x – Miami Heat	46	36	.561	18.0	82
9	pi – Chicago Bulls	39	43	.476	25.0	82
10	pi – Atlanta Hawks	36	46	.439	28.0	82
11	Brooklyn Nets	32	50	.390	32.0	82
12	Toronto Raptors	25	57	.305	39.0	82
13	Charlotte Hornets	21	61	.256	43.0	82
14	Washington Wizards	15	67	.183	49.0	82
15	Detroit Pistons	14	68	.171	50.0	82

== Game log ==
=== Preseason ===
2023 preseason game log
Total: 2–2 (Home: 1–1; Road: 1–1)
Preseason: 2–2 (home: 1–1; road: 1–1)

Game	Date	Team	Score	High points	High rebounds	High assists	Location Attendance	Record
1	October 9	@ L.A. Lakers	L 126–129	Cam Thomas (26)	Noah Clowney (8)	Ben Simmons (3)	T-Mobile Arena	0–1
2	October 12	Maccabi Ra'anana	W 135–103	Mikal Bridges (23)	Darius Bazley (14)	Ben Simmons (9)	Barclays Center; 12,346	1–1
3	October 16	Philadelphia	L 119–127	Cam Thomas (18)	Day'Ron Sharpe (10)	Ben Simmons (9)	Barclays Center; 14,966	1–2
4	October 18	@ Miami	W 107–104	Lonnie Walker IV (22)	Day'Ron Sharpe (11)	Ben Simmons (7)	Kaseya Center; 19,600	2–2

2023–24 preseason schedule

=== Regular season ===
2023–24 game log
Total: 32–50 (Home: 20–21; Road: 12–29)
October: 1–2 (home: 0–1; road: 1–1)

Game	Date	Team	Score	High points	High rebounds	High assists	Location Attendance	Record
1	October 25	Cleveland	L 113–114	Cam Thomas (36)	Ben Simmons (10)	Ben Simmons (9)	Barclays Center; 17,931	0–1
2	October 27	@ Dallas	L 120–125	Cam Thomas (30)	O'Neale, Simmons (10)	Dinwiddie, Simmons (8)	American Airlines Center; 20,238	0–2
3	October 30	@ Charlotte	W 133–121	Cam Thomas (33)	Ben Simmons (10)	Ben Simmons (8)	Spectrum Center; 14,491	1–2

November: 8–7 (home: 6–4; road: 2–3)

Game	Date	Team	Score	High points	High rebounds	High assists	Location Attendance	Record
4	November 1	@ Miami	W 109–105	Mikal Bridges (21)	Ben Simmons (11)	Bridges, O'Neale, Simmons (5)	Kaseya Center; 19,600	2–2
5	November 3	@ Chicago	W 109–107	Dorian Finney-Smith (21)	Day'Ron Sharpe (10)	Spencer Dinwiddie (9)	United Center; 20,645	3–2
6	November 4	Boston	L 114–124	Cam Thomas (27)	Dorian Finney-Smith (8)	Spencer Dinwiddie (6)	Barclays Center; 17,983	3–3
7	November 6	Milwaukee	L 125–129	Cam Thomas (45)	Ben Simmons (15)	Bridges, Simmons (4)	Barclays Center; 17,935	3–4
8	November 8	L.A. Clippers	W 100–93	Lonnie Walker IV (21)	O'Neale, Sharpe (10)	Mikal Bridges (7)	Barclays Center; 17,933	4–4
9	November 10	@ Boston	L 107–121	Lonnie Walker IV (20)	Walker IV, Watford (7)	Dennis Smith Jr. (7)	TD Garden; 19,156	4–5
10	November 12	Washington	W 102–94	Mikal Bridges (27)	Bridges, Claxton (13)	Dennis Smith Jr. (6)	Barclays Center; 17,732	5–5
11	November 14	Orlando	W 124–104	Spencer Dinwiddie (29)	Day'Ron Sharpe (10)	Spencer Dinwiddie (9)	Barclays Center; 17,361	6–5
12	November 16	@ Miami	L 115–122	Bridges, Walker IV (23)	Mikal Bridges (7)	Spencer Dinwiddie (7)	Kaseya Center; 19,866	6–6
13	November 19	Philadelphia	L 99–121	Lonnie Walker IV (26)	Nic Claxton (9)	Spencer Dinwiddie (5)	Barclays Center; 17,934	6–7
14	November 22	@ Atlanta	L 145–147 (OT)	Mikal Bridges (45)	Nic Claxton (11)	Spencer Dinwiddie (12)	State Farm Arena; 17,340	6–8
15	November 25	Miami	W 112–97	Mikal Bridges (24)	Cameron Johnson (10)	Spencer Dinwiddie (11)	Barclays Center; 17,817	7–8
16	November 26	Chicago	W 118–109	Spencer Dinwiddie (24)	O'Neale, Sharpe (9)	Spencer Dinwiddie (7)	Barclays Center; 16,687	8–8
17	November 28	Toronto	W 115–103	Spencer Dinwiddie (23)	Mikal Bridges (10)	Spencer Dinwiddie (8)	Barclays Center; 15,844	9–8
18	November 30	Charlotte	L 128–129	Cam Thomas (26)	Nic Claxton (14)	Spencer Dinwiddie (8)	Barclays Center; 16,072	9–9

December: 6–9 (home: 3–3; road: 3–6)

Game	Date	Team	Score	High points	High rebounds	High assists	Location Attendance	Record
19	December 2	Orlando	W 129–101	Mikal Bridges (42)	Dennis Smith Jr. (11)	Royce O'Neale (7)	Barclays Center; 17,966	10–9
20	December 6	@ Atlanta	W 114–113	Mikal Bridges (32)	Claxton, Sharpe (10)	Mikal Bridges (6)	State Farm Arena; 15,906	11–9
21	December 8	Washington	W 124–97	Mikal Bridges (21)	Nic Claxton (15)	Spencer Dinwiddie (9)	Barclays Center; 16,587	12–9
22	December 11	@ Sacramento	L 118–131	Mikal Bridges (22)	Nic Claxton (10)	Spencer Dinwiddie (8)	Golden 1 Center; 17,794	12–10
23	December 13	@ Phoenix	W 116–112	Cam Thomas (24)	Spencer Dinwiddie (8)	Spencer Dinwiddie (7)	Footprint Center; 17,071	13–10
24	December 14	@ Denver	L 101–124	Spencer Dinwiddie (17)	Day'Ron Sharpe (13)	Spencer Dinwiddie (8)	Ball Arena; 19,636	13–11
25	December 16	@ Golden State	L 120–124	Cam Thomas (41)	Nic Claxton (12)	Spencer Dinwiddie (14)	Chase Center; 18,064	13–12
26	December 18	@ Utah	L 108–125	Cam Thomas (32)	Spencer Dinwiddie (8)	Spencer Dinwiddie (11)	Delta Center; 18,206	13–13
27	December 20	New York	L 102–121	Johnson, Thomas (20)	Day'Ron Sharpe (15)	Royce O'Neale (6)	Barclays Center; 18,071	13–14
28	December 22	Denver	L 117–122	Cam Thomas (23)	Nic Claxton (16)	Bridges, Claxton (6)	Barclays Center; 17,732	13–15
29	December 23	Detroit	W 126–115	Mikal Bridges (29)	Nic Claxton (7)	Bridges, Dinwiddie (7)	Barclays Center; 17,732	14–15
30	December 26	@ Detroit	W 118–112	Cameron Johnson (24)	Claxton, Sharpe (11)	Spencer Dinwiddie (6)	Little Caesars Arena; 19,811	15–15
31	December 27	Milwaukee	L 122–144	Jalen Wilson (21)	Jalen Wilson (10)	Dennis Smith Jr. (8)	Barclays Center; 18,199	15–16
32	December 29	@ Washington	L 104–110	Mikal Bridges (19)	Nic Claxton (12)	Spencer Dinwiddie (6)	Capital One Arena; 16,825	15–17
33	December 31	@ Oklahoma City	L 108–124	Mikal Bridges (22)	Nic Claxton (16)	Mikal Bridges (7)	Paycom Center; 18,203	15–18

January: 4–10 (home: 3–5; road: 1–5)

Game	Date	Team	Score	High points	High rebounds	High assists	Location Attendance	Record
34	January 2	@ New Orleans	L 85–112	Cameron Johnson (17)	Day'Ron Sharpe (9)	Dinwiddie, O'Neale (5)	Smoothie King Center; 16,253	15–19
35	January 3	@ Houston	L 101–112	Bridges, Johnson (15)	Nic Claxton (13)	three players (5)	Toyota Center; 16,563	15–20
36	January 5	Oklahoma City	W 124–115	Claxton, Dinwiddie (23)	Nic Claxton (13)	Dennis Smith Jr. (7)	Barclays Center; 18,147	16–20
37	January 7	Portland	L 127–134 (OT)	Mikal Bridges (42)	Nic Claxton (11)	Dennis Smith Jr. (10)	Barclays Center; 17,732	16–21
38	January 11	@ Cleveland	L 102–111	Bridges, Thomas (26)	Nic Claxton (11)	Dennis Smith Jr. (5)	(France) Accor Arena; 15,887	16–22
39	January 15	Miami	L 95–96 (OT)	Mikal Bridges (26)	Nic Claxton (13)	Mikal Bridges (6)	Barclays Center; 17,893	16–23
40	January 17	@ Portland	L 103–105	Mikal Bridges (21)	Nic Claxton (12)	Spencer Dinwiddie (7)	Moda Center; 17,021	16–24
41	January 19	@ L.A. Lakers	W 130–112	Cam Thomas (33)	Nic Claxton (14)	three players (5)	Crypto.com Arena; 18,997	17–24
42	January 21	@ L.A. Clippers	L 114–125	Mikal Bridges (26)	Dorian Finney-Smith (9)	Spencer Dinwiddie (7)	Crypto.com Arena; 19,370	17–25
43	January 23	New York	L 103–108	Mikal Bridges (36)	Nic Claxton (17)	Dorian Finney-Smith (7)	Barclays Center; 17,732	17–26
44	January 25	Minnesota	L 94–96	Cam Thomas (25)	Nic Claxton (11)	Nic Claxton (4)	Barclays Center; 17,732	17–27
45	January 27	Houston	W 106–104	Cam Thomas (37)	Nic Claxton (13)	Spencer Dinwiddie (9)	Barclays Center; 17,732	18–27
46	January 29	Utah	W 147–114	Mikal Bridges (33)	Nic Claxton (10)	Ben Simmons (11)	Barclays Center; 16,054	19–27
47	January 31	Phoenix	L 120–136	Cam Thomas (25)	Nic Claxton (9)	Lonnie Walker IV (7)	Barclays Center; 17,732	19–28

February: 4–8 (home: 2–4; road: 2–4)

Game	Date	Team	Score	High points	High rebounds	High assists	Location Attendance	Record
48	February 3	@ Philadelphia	W 136–121	Cam Thomas (40)	Nic Claxton (15)	Spencer Dinwiddie (6)	Wells Fargo Center; 20,673	20–28
49	February 5	Golden State	L 98–109	Cam Thomas (18)	Johnson, Smith Jr. (8)	Dinwiddie, Smith Jr. (5)	Barclays Center; 17,919	20–29
50	February 6	Dallas	L 107–119	Mikal Bridges (28)	Nic Claxton (11)	Cam Thomas (8)	Barclays Center; 17,732	20–30
51	February 8	Cleveland	L 95–118	Mikal Bridges (26)	Nic Claxton (7)	Dennis Smith Jr. (7)	Barclays Center; 17,304	20–31
52	February 10	San Antonio	W 123–103	Cam Thomas (25)	Nic Claxton (11)	Dennis Schröder (12)	Barclays Center; 18,005	21–31
53	February 13	Boston	L 110–118	Mikal Bridges (27)	Nic Claxton (8)	Ben Simmons (8)	Barclays Center; 18,053	21–32
54	February 14	@ Boston	L 86–136	Trendon Watford (15)	Nic Claxton (8)	Dennis Smith Jr. (5)	TD Garden; 19,156	21–33
All-Star Game
55	February 22	@ Toronto	L 93–121	Mikal Bridges (21)	Nic Claxton (10)	Simmons, Thomas (4)	Scotiabank Arena; 19,800	21–34
56	February 24	@ Minnesota	L 86–101	Cam Thomas (18)	Dorian Finney-Smith (9)	Mikal Bridges (8)	Target Center; 18,024	21–35
57	February 26	@ Memphis	W 111–86	Dennis Schröder (18)	Dorian Finney-Smith (9)	Schröder, Thomas (5)	FedExForum; 15,417	22–35
58	February 27	@ Orlando	L 81–108	Dennis Schröder (15)	Trendon Watford (7)	Dennis Smith Jr. (5)	Kia Center; 17,708	22–36
59	February 29	Atlanta	W 124–97	Cameron Johnson (29)	Claxton, Schröder, Sharpe (8)	Dennis Schröder (7)	Barclays Center; 17,284	23–36

March: 6–10 (home: 3–3; road: 3–7)

Game	Date	Team	Score	High points	High rebounds	High assists	Location Attendance	Record
60	March 2	Atlanta	W 114–102	Mikal Bridges (38)	Nic Claxton (13)	Dennis Schröder (8)	Barclays Center; 18,075	24–36
61	March 4	Memphis	L 102–106	Nic Claxton (21)	Nic Claxton (6)	Dennis Schröder (9)	Barclays Center; 15,847	24–37
62	March 5	Philadelphia	W 112–107	Finney-Smith, Schröder (20)	Nic Claxton (10)	Dennis Schröder (8)	Barclays Center; 17,086	25–37
63	March 7	@ Detroit	L 112–118	Dennis Schröder (31)	Nic Claxton (10)	Dennis Schröder (8)	Little Caesars Arena; 19,011	25–38
64	March 9	@ Charlotte	L 99–110	Cam Thomas (31)	Nic Claxton (10)	Dennis Schröder (7)	Spectrum Center; 19,090	25–39
65	March 10	@ Cleveland	W 120–101	Cam Thomas (29)	Nic Claxton (10)	Dennis Schröder (8)	Rocket Mortgage FieldHouse; 19,432	26–39
66	March 13	@ Orlando	L 106–114	Cam Thomas (21)	Cam Thomas (8)	Nic Claxton (5)	Kia Center; 18,846	26–40
67	March 16	@ Indiana	L 100–121	Cam Thomas (22)	Nic Claxton (10)	Dennis Schröder (5)	Gainbridge Fieldhouse; 17,009	26–41
68	March 17	@ San Antonio	L 115–122 (OT)	Cam Thomas (31)	Nic Claxton (14)	Dennis Schröder (7)	Moody Center; 16,057	26–42
69	March 19	New Orleans	L 91–104	Cam Thomas (25)	Day'Ron Sharpe (17)	Dennis Schröder (5)	Barclays Center; 17,732	26–43
70	March 21	@ Milwaukee	L 108–115	Mikal Bridges (24)	Nic Claxton (9)	Dennis Schröder (9)	Fiserv Forum; 17,341	26–44
71	March 23	@ New York	L 93–105	Cam Thomas (19)	Nic Claxton (9)	Cam Thomas (6)	Madison Square Garden; 19,812	26–45
72	March 25	@ Toronto	W 96–88	Schröder, Watford (19)	Nic Claxton (16)	Dennis Schröder (7)	Scotiabank Arena; 18,375	27–45
73	March 27	@ Washington	W 122–119 (OT)	Cam Thomas (38)	Nic Claxton (13)	Dennis Schröder (8)	Capital One Arena; 15,159	28–45
74	March 29	Chicago	W 125–108	Cam Thomas (28)	Nic Claxton (13)	Dennis Schröder (7)	Barclays Center; 17,894	29–45
75	March 31	L.A. Lakers	L 104–116	Cam Thomas (30)	Trendon Watford (8)	Cam Thomas (6)	Barclays Center; 18,162	29–46

April: 3–4 (home: 3–1; road: 0–3)

Game	Date	Team	Score	High points	High rebounds	High assists	Location Attendance	Record
76	April 1	@ Indiana	L 111–133	Cam Thomas (22)	Claxton, Sharpe (11)	Mikal Bridges (6)	Gainbridge Fieldhouse; 16,522	29–47
77	April 3	Indiana	W 115–111	Cam Thomas (27)	Nic Claxton (13)	Dennis Schröder (11)	Barclays Center; 17,732	30–47
78	April 6	Detroit	W 113–103	Cam Thomas (32)	Nic Claxton (9)	Dennis Schröder (6)	Barclays Center; 17,732	31–47
79	April 7	Sacramento	L 77–107	Cam Thomas (21)	Noah Clowney (10)	Dennis Schröder (6)	Barclays Center; 17,732	31–48
80	April 10	Toronto	W 106–102	Cam Thomas (23)	Nic Claxton (11)	Dennis Schröder (9)	Barclays Center; 17,732	32–48
81	April 12	@ New York	L 107–111	Cam Thomas (41)	Trendon Watford (13)	Cam Thomas (6)	Madison Square Garden; 19,812	32–49
82	April 14	@ Philadelphia	L 86–107	Cam Thomas (18)	Jalen Wilson (9)	Walker IV, Watford (5)	Wells Fargo Center; 20,246	32–50

2023–24 season schedule

=== In-Season Tournament ===
This was the first regular season where all the NBA teams competed in a mid-season tournament setting due to the implementation of the 2023 NBA In-Season Tournament. During the in-season tournament period, the Nets competed in Group C of the Eastern Conference, which included the Boston Celtics, Toronto Raptors, Chicago Bulls, and Orlando Magic.

==== East group C ====
Pos	Team	Pld	W	L	PF	PA	PD	Qualification	BOS	ORL	BKN	TOR	CHI
1	Boston Celtics	4	3 (Note: Tied on head-to-head results. Overall point difference is used as the tiebreaker.)	1	449	422	+27	Advance to knockout stage	—	96–113	121–107	108–105	124–97
2	Orlando Magic	4	3	1	446	424	+22		113–96	—	104–124	126–107	103–97
3	Brooklyn Nets	4	3	1	455	435	+20		107–121	124–104	—	115–103	109–107
4	Toronto Raptors	4	1	3	436	457	−21		105–108	107–126	103–115	—	121–108
5	Chicago Bulls	4	0	4	409	457	−48		97–124	97–103	107–109	108–121	—

Source: NBA
Rules for classification: Tiebreakers

== Player statistics ==
Legend
GP	Games played	GS	Games started	MPG	Minutes per game
FG%	Field-goal percentage	3P%	3-point field-goal percentage	FT%	Free-throw percentage
RPG	Rebounds per game	APG	Assists per game	SPG	Steals per game
BPG	Blocks per game	PPG	Points per game

=== Regular season ===
Brooklyn Nets statistics
Player	GP	GS	MPG	FG%	3P%	FT%	RPG	APG	SPG	BPG	PPG
Keita Bates-Diop^{†}	14	0	4.9	.500	.200	1.000	.6	.3	.2	.1	1.6
Mikal Bridges	82	82	34.8	.436	.372	.814	4.5	3.6	1.0	.4	19.6
Armoni Brooks	10	0	10.4	.326	.344	.500	1.8	.5	.1	.1	4.2
Nic Claxton	71	71	29.8	.629	.200	.551	9.9	2.1	.6	2.1	11.8
Noah Clowney	23	4	16.1	.538	.364	.700	3.5	.8	.3	.7	5.8
Spencer Dinwiddie^{†}	48	48	30.7	.391	.320	.781	3.3	6.0	.8	.2	12.6
Dorian Finney-Smith	68	56	28.4	.421	.348	.717	4.7	1.6	.8	.6	8.5
Harry Giles III^{†}	16	0	5.1	.500	.273	.538	1.6	.4	.1	.2	3.4
Jacob Gilyard^{†}	4	0	11.3	.000	.000		.8	1.5	1.5	.0	.0
Cameron Johnson	58	47	27.6	.446	.391	.789	4.3	2.4	.8	.3	13.4
Keon Johnson	5	0	12.2	.381	.400	.917	1.4	.6	.6	.2	6.2
Dariq Whitehead	2	0	12.0	.200	.000	.500	2.0	1.5	.0	.5	1.5
Royce O'Neale^{†}	49	6	24.5	.388	.366	.682	4.5	2.8	.7	.6	7.4
Dennis Schröder^{†}	29	25	32.0	.424	.412	.797	3.5	6.0	.6	.3	14.6
Day'Ron Sharpe	61	1	15.1	.571	.267	.610	6.4	1.4	.4	.7	6.8
Ben Simmons	15	12	23.9	.581		.400	7.9	5.7	.8	.6	6.1
Dennis Smith Jr.	56	2	18.9	.435	.294	.741	2.9	3.6	1.2	.2	6.6
Cam Thomas	66	51	31.4	.442	.364	.856	3.2	2.9	.7	.2	22.5
Lonnie Walker IV	58	0	17.4	.423	.384	.763	2.2	1.3	.6	.3	9.7
Trendon Watford	63	2	13.6	.527	.397	.794	3.1	1.3	.4	.3	6.9
Jalen Wilson	43	3	15.4	.425	.324	.826	3.0	1.0	.3	.1	5.0

- ^{†} Denotes player spent time with another team in the season. Stats reflect time with the Nets only.

== Transactions ==
=== Trades ===
July 6, 2023	To Brooklyn Nets Future draft considerations	To Houston Rockets Patty Mills 2028 second round pick (from Milwaukee)
July 6, 2023	To Brooklyn Nets Cash considerations	To Detroit Pistons Joe Harris 2027 second round pick (from Dallas) 2029 second round pick (from Milwaukee)

=== Free agency ===
==== Re-signed ====
Date	Player	Ref.
July 6	Cameron Johnson	

==== Additions ====
Date	Player	Former team	Ref.
July 8	Dennis Smith Jr.	Charlotte Hornets	
July 10	Lonnie Walker IV	Los Angeles Lakers	

==== Subtractions ====
Date	Player	Reason left	New team	Ref.
July 4	Yuta Watanabe	Free agency	Phoenix Suns	
July 14	Seth Curry	Free agency	Dallas Mavericks	
July 15	Edmond Sumner	Waived	Charlotte Hornets	
