= Rocky River High School =

Rocky River High School may refer to:

- Rocky River High School (North Carolina) in Mint Hill, North Carolina
- Rocky River High School (Ohio) in Rocky River, Ohio
