= 2023–24 Milwaukee Bucks season =

2023–24 NBA season by team

- Division champions
- Head coach: Adrian Griffin (fired Jan. 23, 30–13 record); Joe Prunty (interim, 2–1 record); Doc Rivers (17–19 record)
- General manager: Jon Horst
- Owners: Wesley Edens; Jimmy Haslam
- Arena: Fiserv Forum

Results
- Record: 49–33 (.598)
- Place: Division: 1st (Central); Conference: 3rd (Eastern)
- Playoff finish: First round (lost to Pacers 2–4)
- Stats at Basketball Reference

Local media
- Television: Bally Sports Wisconsin; Weigel Broadcasting (Note: Affiliates include: WDJT-TV (Milwaukee); WBAY-TV (Green Bay); WISC-TV (Madison); WEAU/WECX (La Crosse); WSAW-TV/WYOW (Wausau); WQAD-DT3 (Quad Cities)) (10 games)
- Radio: WTMJ

The 2023–24 Milwaukee Bucks season was the 56th season for the franchise in the National Basketball Association (NBA). On May 4, 2023, the Bucks fired head coach Mike Budenholzer after five seasons with the team, including winning the 2021 NBA Finals as head coach, after a disappointing first round exit last season to the eight–seeded and eventual Eastern Conference champion Miami Heat. On June 5, 2023, the Bucks hired Adrian Griffin as their head coach. On September 27, 2023, 7-time NBA All-Star point guard Damian Lillard was traded to Milwaukee as part of a three-team trade that sent Jrue Holiday, Deandre Ayton, Toumani Camara, and a 2029 first-round draft pick to the Portland Trail Blazers, and Grayson Allen, Jusuf Nurkić, Nassir Little, and Keon Johnson to the Phoenix Suns.

The Bucks won the East Group B of the 2023 NBA In-Season Tournament after going undefeated at 4–0 in the group stage. They defeated the New York Knicks in the quarterfinals. However, they were later eliminated from the tournament with a loss to the Indiana Pacers in the semifinals.

On January 23, 2024, the Bucks dismissed head coach Adrian Griffin from his position despite having the second-best record in both the Eastern Conference and the NBA at the time with a 30–13 record. Three days later, Doc Rivers was hired as the Bucks' head coach.

On April 7, 2024, despite Milwaukee losing to the New York Knicks 122–109, the Bucks clinched their eighth straight playoff berth following the Miami Heat losing to the Indiana Pacers and the Orlando Magic defeating the Chicago Bulls. However, Bucks star Giannis Antetokounmpo suffered a calf injury at the end of the season, causing him to miss the first round matchup against the Pacers in the playoffs. Lillard also missed postseason games due to injury, leaving the short-handed Bucks to be eliminated by the Pacers in six games, suffering a first round upset for the second straight year.

The Milwaukee Bucks drew an average home attendance of 17,640 in 42 home games in the 2023-24 NBA season.

== Draft ==
Round	Pick	Player	Position(s)	Nationality	College / Club
2	58	Chris Livingston	SF/PF	United States	Kentucky (Fr.)

The Bucks entered this draft with a second-round pick. They had traded their first-round pick to the Houston Rockets, who then swapped it with the Los Angeles Clippers when the Oklahoma City Thunder qualified for the 2023 NBA playoffs and thus fell outside the top-6 protection, removing the necessity of the initial least-favorable selection process between Los Angeles and Oklahoma City.

== Roster ==
2023–24 Milwaukee Bucks roster
Players

Pos.	No.	Player	Height	Weight	DOB	From
F	34	Giannis Antetokounmpo	6 ft 11 in (2.11 m)	243 lb (110 kg)	1994-12-06	Greece
F	43	Thanasis Antetokounmpo	6 ft 7 in (2.01 m)	220 lb (100 kg)	1992-07-18	Greece
G	5	Malik Beasley	6 ft 4 in (1.93 m)	187 lb (85 kg)	1996-11-26	Florida State
F	3	MarJon Beauchamp	6 ft 7 in (2.01 m)	199 lb (90 kg)	2000-10-12	Yakima Valley
G	21	Patrick Beverley	6 ft 1 in (1.85 m)	180 lb (82 kg)	1988-07-12	Arkansas
G	24	Pat Connaughton	6 ft 5 in (1.96 m)	210 lb (95 kg)	1993-01-06	Notre Dame
F	99	Jae Crowder	6 ft 6 in (1.98 m)	235 lb (107 kg)	1990-07-06	Marquette
F	12	Danilo Gallinari	6 ft 10 in (2.08 m)	236 lb (107 kg)	1988-08-08	Italy
F	00	Jaylin Galloway (TW)	6 ft 7 in (2.01 m)	190 lb (86 kg)	2002-12-21	Sprayberry HS (GA)
G	20	A. J. Green	6 ft 4 in (1.93 m)	190 lb (86 kg)	1999-09-27	Northern Iowa
G	44	Andre Jr. Jackson	6 ft 6 in (1.98 m)	209 lb (95 kg)	2001-11-13	Connecticut
G	0	Damian Lillard	6 ft 2 in (1.88 m)	195 lb (88 kg)	1990-07-15	Weber State
F	7	Chris Livingston	6 ft 6 in (1.98 m)	220 lb (100 kg)	2003-10-15	Kentucky
C	11	Brook Lopez	7 ft 1 in (2.16 m)	282 lb (128 kg)	1988-04-01	Stanford
F	22	Khris Middleton	6 ft 7 in (2.01 m)	225 lb (102 kg)	1991-08-12	Texas A&M
F/C	9	Bobby Jr. Portis	6 ft 10 in (2.08 m)	250 lb (113 kg)	1995-02-10	Arkansas
G	55	Ryan Rollins (TW)	6 ft 3 in (1.91 m)	180 lb (82 kg)	2002-07-03	Toledo
G	23	TyTy Jr. Washington (TW)	6 ft 3 in (1.91 m)	195 lb (88 kg)	2001-11-15	Kentucky

Coaches
Head coach
- Doc Rivers
Assistant(s)
- Vin Baker
- DJ Bakker
- Sidney Dobner
- Trevor Gleeson
- Dave Joerger
- Rex Kalamian
- Nate Mitchell
- Patrick Mutombo
- Josh Oppenheimer
- Joe Prunty

Legend
- (DP) Unsigned draft pick
- (FA) Free agent
- (S) Suspended
- (GL) On assignment to G League affiliate
- (TW) Two-way affiliate player
- Injured

Roster
Updated: March 30, 2024

== Standings ==
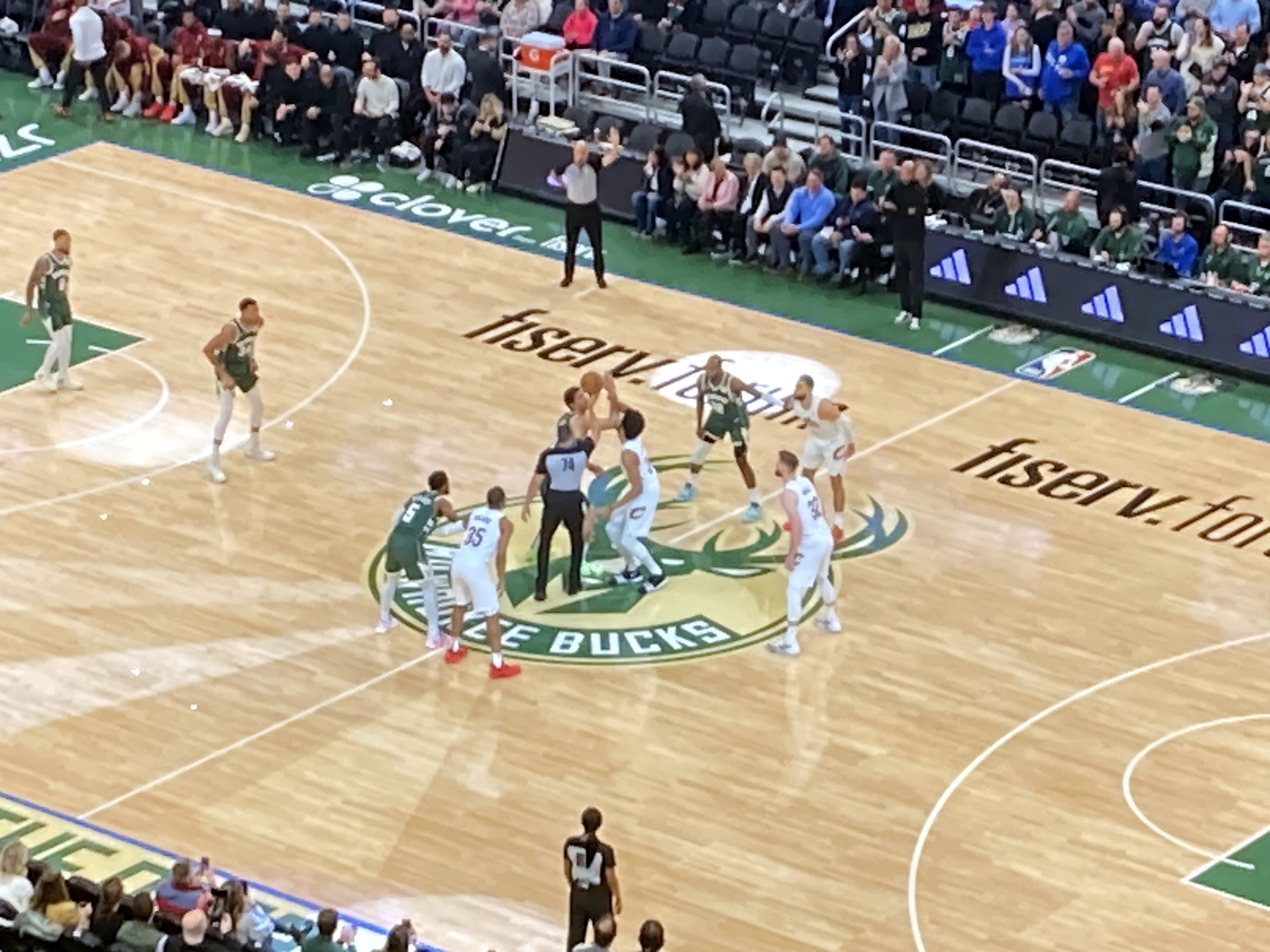
The Bucks hosting Cleveland

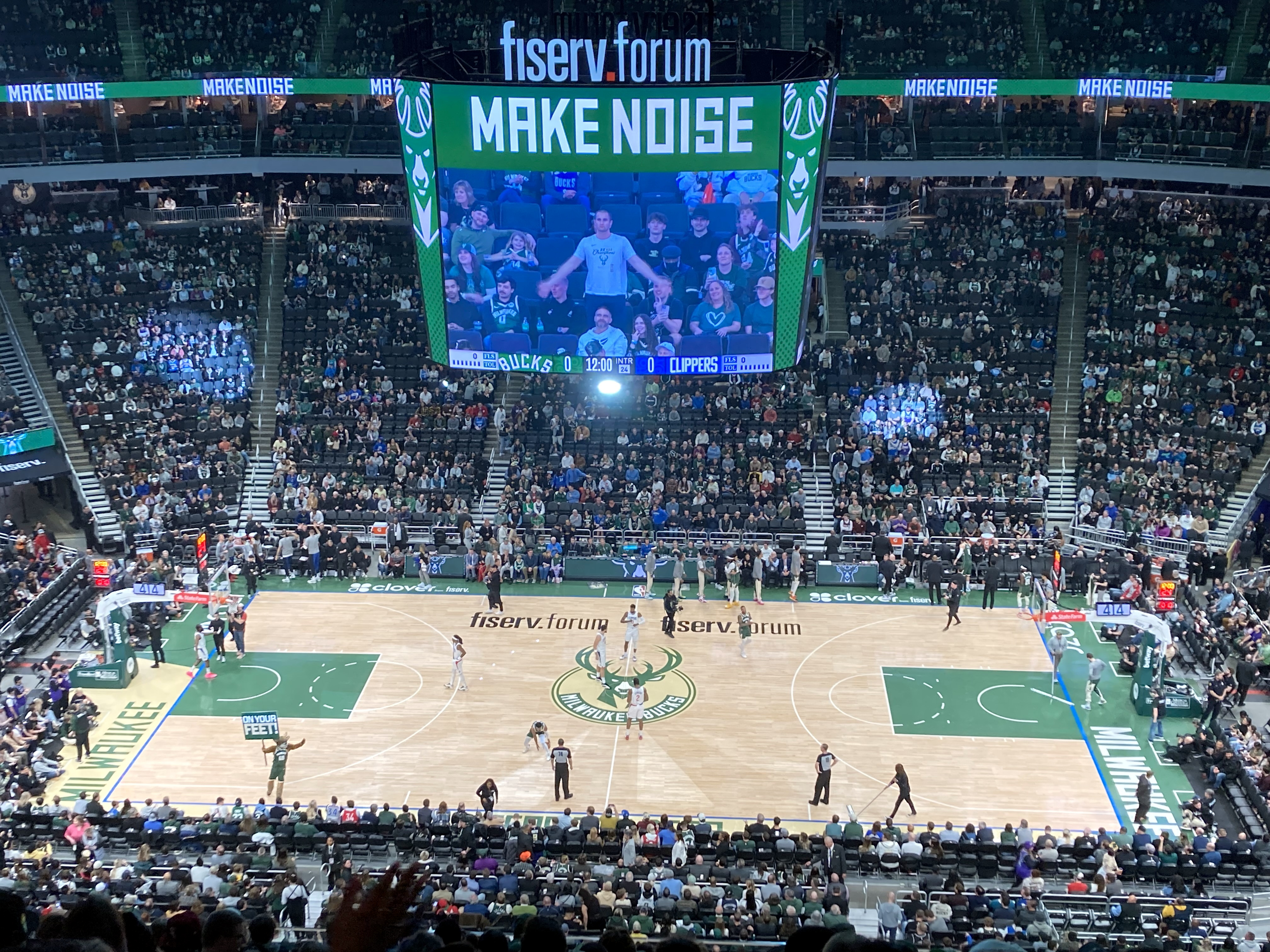
The Bucks hosting the Los Angeles Clippers

=== Division ===
Central Division	W	L	PCT	GB	Home	Road	Div	GP
y – Milwaukee Bucks	49	33	.598	–	31‍–‍11	18‍–‍22	10‍–‍7	82
x – Cleveland Cavaliers	48	34	.585	1.0	26‍–‍15	22‍–‍19	11‍–‍5	82
x – Indiana Pacers	47	35	.573	2.0	26‍–‍15	21‍–‍20	11‍–‍6	82
pi – Chicago Bulls	39	43	.476	10.0	20‍–‍21	19‍–‍22	7‍–‍9	82
Detroit Pistons	14	68	.171	35.0	7‍–‍33	7‍–‍35	2‍–‍14	82

=== Conference ===
Eastern Conference
#	Team	W	L	PCT	GB	GP
1	z – Boston Celtics *	64	18	.780	–	82
2	x – New York Knicks	50	32	.610	14.0	82
3	y – Milwaukee Bucks *	49	33	.598	15.0	82
4	x – Cleveland Cavaliers	48	34	.585	16.0	82
5	y – Orlando Magic *	47	35	.573	17.0	82
6	x – Indiana Pacers	47	35	.573	17.0	82
7	x – Philadelphia 76ers	47	35	.573	17.0	82
8	x – Miami Heat	46	36	.561	18.0	82
9	pi – Chicago Bulls	39	43	.476	25.0	82
10	pi – Atlanta Hawks	36	46	.439	28.0	82
11	Brooklyn Nets	32	50	.390	32.0	82
12	Toronto Raptors	25	57	.305	39.0	82
13	Charlotte Hornets	21	61	.256	43.0	82
14	Washington Wizards	15	67	.183	49.0	82
15	Detroit Pistons	14	68	.171	50.0	82

== Game log ==
=== Preseason ===
2023 preseason game log
Total: 3–2 (Home: 2–0; Road: 1–2)
Preseason: 3–2 (home: 2–0; road: 1–2)

Game	Date	Team	Score	High points	High rebounds	High assists	Location Attendance	Record
1	October 8	Chicago	W 105–102	MarJon Beauchamp (18)	MarJon Beauchamp (9)	TyTy Washington Jr. (7)	Fiserv Forum; 15,433	1–0
2	October 10	@ Memphis	L 102–108	Jae Crowder (14)	Beauchamp, Portis (8)	Cameron Payne (5)	FedExForum; 14,797	1–1
3	October 15	@ L.A. Lakers	W 108–97	Giannis Antetokounmpo (16)	G. Antetokounmpo, Connaughton, Portis (8)	Cameron Payne (7)	Crypto.com Arena; 18,997	2–1
4	October 17	@ Oklahoma City	L 101–124	Malik Beasley (20)	Giannis Antetokounmpo (10)	Pat Connaughton (5)	Paycom Center	2–2
5	October 20	Memphis	W 124–116	Giannis Antetokounmpo (26)	Jae Crowder (10)	Middleton, Washington Jr. (5)	Fiserv Forum; 15,993	3–2

2023–24 preseason schedule

=== Regular season ===
2023–24 game log
Total: 49–33 (Home: 31–11; Road: 18–22)
October: 2–1 (home: 2–1; road: 0–0)

Game	Date	Team	Score	High points	High rebounds	High assists	Location Attendance	Record
1	October 26	Philadelphia	W 118–117	Damian Lillard (39)	Giannis Antetokounmpo (13)	Lillard, Middleton (4)	Fiserv Forum; 17,783	1–0
2	October 29	Atlanta	L 110–127	Giannis Antetokounmpo (26)	Giannis Antetokounmpo (11)	Damian Lillard (5)	Fiserv Forum; 17,341	1–1
3	October 30	Miami	W 122–114	Giannis Antetokounmpo (33)	Bobby Portis (8)	Khris Middleton (5)	Fiserv Forum; 17,341	2–1

November: 11–5 (home: 6–0; road: 5–5)

Game	Date	Team	Score	High points	High rebounds	High assists	Location Attendance	Record
4	November 1	@ Toronto	L 111–130	Malik Beasley (20)	Bobby Portis (6)	Damian Lillard (6)	Scotiabank Arena; 19,800	2–2
5	November 3	New York	W 110–105	Damian Lillard (30)	Khris Middleton (9)	Giannis Antetokounmpo (6)	Fiserv Forum; 17,717	3–2
6	November 6	@ Brooklyn	W 129–125	Giannis Antetokounmpo (36)	Giannis Antetokounmpo (12)	Damian Lillard (7)	Barclays Center; 17,935	4–2
7	November 8	Detroit	W 120–118	Damian Lillard (34)	Giannis Antetokounmpo (9)	Giannis Antetokounmpo (5)	Fiserv Forum; 17,341	5–2
8	November 9	@ Indiana	L 124–126	Giannis Antetokounmpo (54)	Giannis Antetokounmpo (12)	Cameron Payne (5)	Gainbridge Fieldhouse; 14,648	5–3
9	November 11	@ Orlando	L 97–112	Giannis Antetokounmpo (35)	Giannis Antetokounmpo (10)	G. Antetokounmpo, Middleton (7)	Amway Center; 19,354	5–4
10	November 13	Chicago	W 118–109	Giannis Antetokounmpo (35)	Giannis Antetokounmpo (11)	Connaughton, Lillard, Payne (5)	Fiserv Forum; 17,865	6–4
11	November 15	@ Toronto	W 128–112	Damian Lillard (37)	Brook Lopez (8)	Damian Lillard (13)	Scotiabank Arena; 19,800	7–4
12	November 17	@ Charlotte	W 130–99	Damian Lillard (27)	Giannis Antetokounmpo (8)	Giannis Antetokounmpo (9)	Spectrum Center; 19,258	8–4
13	November 18	Dallas	W 132–125	Giannis Antetokounmpo (40)	Giannis Antetokounmpo (15)	Damian Lillard (12)	Fiserv Forum; 18,128	9–4
14	November 20	@ Washington	W 142–129	Giannis Antetokounmpo (42)	Giannis Antetokounmpo (13)	Giannis Antetokounmpo (8)	Capital One Arena; 17,746	10–4
15	November 22	@ Boston	L 116–119	Brook Lopez (28)	Giannis Antetokounmpo (13)	Khris Middleton (7)	TD Garden; 19,156	10–5
16	November 24	Washington	W 131–128	Brook Lopez (39)	Malik Beasley (11)	Damian Lillard (10)	Fiserv Forum; 17,880	11–5
17	November 26	Portland	W 108–102	Giannis Antetokounmpo (33)	Giannis Antetokounmpo (16)	Giannis Antetokounmpo (6)	Fiserv Forum; 17,602	12–5
18	November 28	@ Miami	W 131–124	Giannis Antetokounmpo (33)	G. Antetokounmpo, Beasley (10)	Damian Lillard (9)	Kaseya Center; 19,691	13–5
19	November 30	@ Chicago	L 113–120 (OT)	Giannis Antetokounmpo (26)	Giannis Antetokounmpo (14)	Damian Lillard (13)	United Center; 19,838	13–6

December: 11–2 (home: 8–1; road: 3–1)

Game	Date	Team	Score	High points	High rebounds	High assists	Location Attendance	Record
20	December 2	Atlanta	W 132–121	Giannis Antetokounmpo (32)	G. Antetokounmpo, Portis (11)	Giannis Antetokounmpo (10)	Fiserv Forum; 17,866	14–6
21	December 5	New York	W 146–122	Giannis Antetokounmpo (35)	G. Antetokounmpo, Lopez (8)	Giannis Antetokounmpo (10)	Fiserv Forum; 17,448	15–6
22	December 7	Indiana	L 119–128	Giannis Antetokounmpo (37)	Giannis Antetokounmpo (10)	Damian Lillard (7)	T-Mobile Arena; 16,837	15–7
23	December 11	Chicago	W 133–129 (OT)	Giannis Antetokounmpo (32)	Khris Middleton (13)	Damian Lillard (9)	Fiserv Forum; 17,440	16–7
24	December 13	Indiana	W 140–126	Giannis Antetokounmpo (64)	Giannis Antetokounmpo (14)	Khris Middleton (7)	Fiserv Forum; 17,431	17–7
25	December 16	Detroit	W 146–114	Damian Lillard (33)	Bobby Portis (12)	Giannis Antetokounmpo (6)	Fiserv Forum; 17,666	18–7
26	December 17	Houston	W 128–119	Damian Lillard (39)	Giannis Antetokounmpo (17)	Damian Lillard (11)	Fiserv Forum; 17,341	19–7
27	December 19	San Antonio	W 132–119	Damian Lillard (40)	Giannis Antetokounmpo (14)	Giannis Antetokounmpo (16)	Fiserv Forum; 17,729	20–7
28	December 21	Orlando	W 118–114	Giannis Antetokounmpo (37)	Giannis Antetokounmpo (10)	Damian Lillard (8)	Fiserv Forum; 17,928	21–7
29	December 23	@ New York	W 130–111	Giannis Antetokounmpo (28)	Bobby Portis (11)	G. Antetokounmpo, Lillard (7)	Madison Square Garden; 19,812	22–7
30	December 25	@ New York	L 122–129	G. Antetokounmpo, Lillard (32)	Giannis Antetokounmpo (13)	Damian Lillard (8)	Madison Square Garden; 19,812	22–8
31	December 27	@ Brooklyn	W 144–122	Giannis Antetokounmpo (32)	Giannis Antetokounmpo (10)	Khris Middleton (10)	Barclays Center; 18,199	23–8
32	December 29	@ Cleveland	W 119–111	Giannis Antetokounmpo (34)	Giannis Antetokounmpo (16)	Khris Middleton (11)	Rocket Mortgage FieldHouse; 19,432	24–8

January: 8–8 (home: 5–3; road: 3–5)

Game	Date	Team	Score	High points	High rebounds	High assists	Location Attendance	Record
33	January 1	Indiana	L 113–122	Giannis Antetokounmpo (30)	Giannis Antetokounmpo (18)	Giannis Antetokounmpo (11)	Fiserv Forum; 17,922	24–9
34	January 3	@ Indiana	L 130–142	Giannis Antetokounmpo (26)	Giannis Antetokounmpo (11)	Giannis Antetokounmpo (8)	Gainbridge Fieldhouse; 17,274	24–10
35	January 4	@ San Antonio	W 125–121	Giannis Antetokounmpo (44)	Giannis Antetokounmpo (14)	Damian Lillard (10)	Frost Bank Center; 19,082	25–10
36	January 6	@ Houston	L 108–112	Giannis Antetokounmpo (48)	Giannis Antetokounmpo (17)	Damian Lillard (8)	Toyota Center; 18,055	25–11
37	January 8	Utah	L 116–132	Giannis Antetokounmpo (25)	Giannis Antetokounmpo (10)	Giannis Antetokounmpo (11)	Fiserv Forum; 17,341	25–12
38	January 11	Boston	W 135–102	Bobby Portis (28)	G. Antetokounmpo, Portis (12)	Khris Middleton (7)	Fiserv Forum; 17,781	26–12
39	January 13	Golden State	W 129–118	Giannis Antetokounmpo (33)	Andre Jackson Jr. (10)	Khris Middleton (10)	Fiserv Forum; 18,009	27–12
40	January 14	Sacramento	W 143–142 (OT)	Damian Lillard (29)	G. Antetokounmpo, Portis (10)	Giannis Antetokounmpo (10)	Fiserv Forum; 17,612	28–12
41	January 17	@ Cleveland	L 95–135	Damian Lillard (17)	Andre Jackson Jr. (8)	Damian Lillard (5)	Rocket Mortgage FieldHouse; 19,432	28–13
42	January 20	@ Detroit	W 141–135	Damian Lillard (45)	G. Antetokounmpo, Lopez (10)	Damian Lillard (11)	Little Caesars Arena; 19,996	29–13
43	January 22	@ Detroit	W 122–113	Giannis Antetokounmpo (31)	Giannis Antetokounmpo (17)	Giannis Antetokounmpo (10)	Little Caesars Arena; 17,201	30–13
44	January 24	Cleveland	W 126–116	Giannis Antetokounmpo (35)	Giannis Antetokounmpo (18)	Giannis Antetokounmpo (10)	Fiserv Forum; 17,510	31–13
45	January 26	Cleveland	L 100–112	G. Antetokounmpo, Lillard (22)	Brook Lopez (12)	Giannis Antetokounmpo (9)	Fiserv Forum; 17,855	31–14
46	January 27	New Orleans	W 141–117	Giannis Antetokounmpo (30)	Giannis Antetokounmpo (12)	Damian Lillard (9)	Fiserv Forum; 17,940	32–14
47	January 29	@ Denver	L 107–113	Giannis Antetokounmpo (29)	G. Antetokounmpo, Portis (12)	Damian Lillard (5)	Ball Arena; 19,801	32–15
48	January 31	@ Portland	L 116–119	Giannis Antetokounmpo (27)	Giannis Antetokounmpo (8)	Khris Middleton (8)	Moda Center; 19,335	32–16

February: 7–5 (home: 3–2; road: 4–3)

Game	Date	Team	Score	High points	High rebounds	High assists	Location Attendance	Record
49	February 3	@ Dallas	W 129–117	Giannis Antetokounmpo (48)	Bobby Portis (10)	Giannis Antetokounmpo (10)	American Airlines Center; 20,377	33–16
50	February 4	@ Utah	L 108–123	Giannis Antetokounmpo (33)	G. Antetokounmpo, Portis (7)	Giannis Antetokounmpo (13)	Delta Center; 18,206	33–17
51	February 6	@ Phoenix	L 106–114	Giannis Antetokounmpo (34)	Giannis Antetokounmpo (10)	G. Antetokounmpo, Connaughton (6)	Footprint Center; 17,071	33–18
52	February 8	Minnesota	L 105–129	A. J. Green (27)	Bobby Portis (9)	Pat Connaughton (9)	Fiserv Forum; 17,577	33–19
53	February 9	Charlotte	W 120–84	Damian Lillard (26)	Giannis Antetokounmpo (14)	Damian Lillard (8)	Fiserv Forum; 17,690	34–19
54	February 12	Denver	W 112–95	Giannis Antetokounmpo (36)	Giannis Antetokounmpo (18)	G. Antetokounmpo, Connaughton, Lillard (5)	Fiserv Forum; 17,444	35–19
55	February 13	Miami	L 97–123	Giannis Antetokounmpo (23)	Giannis Antetokounmpo (11)	Giannis Antetokounmpo (8)	Fiserv Forum; 17,520	35–20
56	February 15	@ Memphis	L 110–113	Giannis Antetokounmpo (35)	Brook Lopez (11)	Giannis Antetokounmpo (12)	FedExForum; 16,544	35–21
57	February 23	@ Minnesota	W 112–107	Giannis Antetokounmpo (33)	Giannis Antetokounmpo (13)	Damian Lillard (10)	Target Center; 18,024	36–21
58	February 25	@ Philadelphia	W 119–98	Giannis Antetokounmpo (30)	Giannis Antetokounmpo (12)	G. Antetokounmpo, Lillard (9)	Wells Fargo Center; 19,831	37–21
59	February 27	Charlotte	W 123–85	Giannis Antetokounmpo (24)	Damian Lillard (9)	Damian Lillard (7)	Fiserv Forum; 17,607	38–21
60	February 29	@ Charlotte	W 111–99	Giannis Antetokounmpo (24)	G. Antetokounmpo, Portis (10)	Giannis Antetokounmpo (5)	Spectrum Center; 18,463	39–21

March: 8–6 (home: 5–1; road: 3–5)

Game	Date	Team	Score	High points	High rebounds	High assists	Location Attendance	Record
61	March 1	@ Chicago	W 113–97	Giannis Antetokounmpo (46)	Giannis Antetokounmpo (16)	Damian Lillard (7)	United Center; 21,249	40–21
62	March 4	L.A. Clippers	W 113–106	Damian Lillard (41)	Bobby Portis (16)	Damian Lillard (4)	Fiserv Forum; 17,875	41–21
63	March 6	@ Golden State	L 90–125	Giannis Antetokounmpo (23)	Giannis Antetokounmpo (7)	G. Antetokounmpo, Lillard (6)	Chase Center; 18,064	41–22
64	March 8	@ L.A. Lakers	L 122–123	Giannis Antetokounmpo (34)	Giannis Antetokounmpo (14)	G. Antetokounmpo, Lillard (12)	Crypto.com Arena; 18,997	41–23
65	March 10	@ L.A. Clippers	W 124–117	Damian Lillard (35)	Bobby Portis (8)	Damian Lillard (11)	Crypto.com Arena; 19,370	42–23
66	March 12	@ Sacramento	L 94–129	Giannis Antetokounmpo (30)	Giannis Antetokounmpo (13)	Damian Lillard (6)	Golden 1 Center; 17,832	42–24
67	March 14	Philadelphia	W 114–105	Giannis Antetokounmpo (32)	Giannis Antetokounmpo (11)	Damian Lillard (9)	Fiserv Forum; 17,635	43–24
68	March 17	Phoenix	W 140–129	Lillard, Portis (31)	Bobby Portis (10)	Damian Lillard (16)	Fiserv Forum; 17,783	44–24
69	March 20	@ Boston	L 119–122	Damian Lillard (32)	Bobby Portis (15)	Middleton, Lillard (6)	TD Garden; 19,156	44–25
70	March 21	Brooklyn	W 115–108	Damian Lillard (30)	G. Antetokounmpo, Portis (9)	Damian Lillard (12)	Fiserv Forum; 17,341	45–25
71	March 24	Oklahoma City	W 118–93	Giannis Antetokounmpo (30)	Giannis Antetokounmpo (19)	Khris Middleton (10)	Fiserv Forum; 17,877	46–25
72	March 26	L.A. Lakers	L 124–128 (2OT)	Giannis Antetokounmpo (29)	Giannis Antetokounmpo (21)	Giannis Antetokounmpo (11)	Fiserv Forum; 18,085	46–26
73	March 28	@ New Orleans	L 100–107	Giannis Antetokounmpo (35)	Giannis Antetokounmpo (14)	Damian Lillard (7)	Smoothie King Center; 17,484	46–27
74	March 30	@ Atlanta	W 122–113	Giannis Antetokounmpo (36)	Giannis Antetokounmpo (16)	Giannis Antetokounmpo (8)	State Farm Arena; 17,700	47–27

April: 2–6 (home: 2–3; road: 0–3)

Game	Date	Team	Score	High points	High rebounds	High assists	Location Attendance	Record
75	April 2	@ Washington	L 113–117	Giannis Antetokounmpo (35)	Giannis Antetokounmpo (15)	Giannis Antetokounmpo (10)	Capital One Arena; 16,492	47–28
76	April 3	Memphis	L 101–111	Brook Lopez (25)	Brook Lopez (10)	G. Antetokounmpo, Connaughton (8)	Fiserv Forum; 17,420	47–29
77	April 5	Toronto	L 111–117	Damian Lillard (36)	Bobby Portis (10)	Lillard, Middleton (6)	Fiserv Forum; 17,750	47–30
78	April 7	New York	L 109–122	Giannis Antetokounmpo (28)	Giannis Antetokounmpo (15)	Giannis Antetokounmpo (8)	Fiserv Forum; 17,536	47–31
79	April 9	Boston	W 104–91	Patrick Beverley (20)	Beverley, Lopez (10)	Khris Middleton (9)	Fiserv Forum; 17,493	48–31
80	April 10	Orlando	W 117–99	Bobby Portis (30)	Bobby Portis (9)	Damian Lillard (9)	Fiserv Forum; 17,563	49–31
81	April 12	@ Oklahoma City	L 107–125	Lopez, Middleton (18)	Bobby Portis (8)	Patrick Beverley (7)	Paycom Center; 18,203	49–32
82	April 14	@ Orlando	L 88–113	Middleton, Portis (17)	Bobby Portis (10)	Khris Middleton (5)	Kia Center; 18,846	49–33

2023–24 season schedule

=== Playoffs ===
2024 playoff game log
Total: 2–4 (home: 2–1; road: 0–3)
First Round: 2–4 (home: 2–1; road: 0–3)

Game	Date	Team	Score	High points	High rebounds	High assists	Location Attendance	Series
1	April 21	Indiana	W 109–94	Damian Lillard (35)	Bobby Portis (11)	Patrick Beverley (8)	Fiserv Forum; 17,341	1–0
2	April 23	Indiana	L 108–125	Damian Lillard (34)	Bobby Portis (11)	Khris Middleton (6)	Fiserv Forum; 17,683	1–1
3	April 26	@ Indiana	L 118–121 (OT)	Khris Middleton (42)	Bobby Portis (18)	Damian Lillard (8)	Gainbridge Fieldhouse; 17,274	1–2
4	April 28	@ Indiana	L 113–126	Brook Lopez (27)	Khris Middleton (10)	Andre Jackson Jr. (7)	Gainbridge Fieldhouse; 17,274	1–3
5	April 30	Indiana	W 115–92	Middleton, Portis (29)	Khris Middleton (12)	Patrick Beverley (12)	Fiserv Forum; 17,341	2–3
6	May 2	@ Indiana	L 98–120	Damian Lillard (28)	Bobby Portis (15)	Patrick Beverley (5)	Gainbridge Fieldhouse; 17,274	2–4

2024 playoff schedule

=== In-Season Tournament ===
This was the first regular season where all the NBA teams competed in a mid-season tournament setting due to the implementation of the 2023 NBA In-Season Tournament. During the in-season tournament period, the Bucks competed in Group B of the Eastern Conference, which included the New York Knicks, Miami Heat, Washington Wizards, and Charlotte Hornets. The Bucks compiled a 4–0 record in the qualifying stage and earned the 1 seed through a higher point differential than the Pacers. After beating the Knicks 146–122 in the quarterfinals, the Bucks saw their in season tournament hopes dashed in an 128–119 loss to the Pacers.

==== East group B ====
Pos	Team	Pld	W	L	PF	PA	PD	Qualification	MIL	NYK	MIA	CHA	WAS
1	Milwaukee Bucks	4	4	0	502	456	+46	Advance to knockout stage	—	110–105	131–124	130–99	131–128
2	New York Knicks	4	3	1	440	398	+42	Advance to knockout stage	105–110	—	100–98	115–91	120–99
3	Miami Heat	4	2	2	454	450	+4		124–131	98–100	—	111–105	121–114
4	Charlotte Hornets	4	1	3	419	473	−54		99–130	91–115	105–111	—	124–117
5	Washington Wizards	4	0	4	458	496	−38		128–131	99–120	114–121	117–124	—

Source: NBA
Rules for classification: Tiebreakers

== Player statistics ==
Legend
GP	Games played	GS	Games started	MPG	Minutes per game
FG%	Field-goal percentage	3P%	3-point field-goal percentage	FT%	Free-throw percentage
RPG	Rebounds per game	APG	Assists per game	SPG	Steals per game
BPG	Blocks per game	PPG	Points per game

=== Regular season ===
Milwaukee Bucks statistics
Player	GP	GS	MPG	FG%	3P%	FT%	RPG	APG	SPG	BPG	PPG
Giannis Antetokounmpo	73	73	35.2	.611	.274	.657	11.5	6.5	1.2	1.1	30.4
Thanasis Antetokounmpo	34	0	4.6	.533	.000	.000	.4	.5	.2	.1	.9
Malik Beasley	79	77	29.6	.443	.413	.714	3.7	1.4	.7	.1	11.3
MarJon Beauchamp	48	1	12.7	.488	.400	.679	2.1	.6	.3	.1	4.4
Patrick Beverley^{†}	26	8	20.9	.391	.361	.852	3.6	2.6	.7	.5	6.0
Marques Bolden^{†}	2	0	1.5				1.0	.0	.0	.0	.0
Pat Connaughton	76	3	22.1	.435	.345	.759	3.1	2.1	.5	.3	5.6
Jae Crowder	50	25	23.1	.422	.349	.722	3.2	1.3	.8	.2	6.2
Danilo Gallinari^{†}	17	0	9.1	.378	.176	.889	1.1	.7	.4	.1	2.8
A. J. Green	56	0	11.0	.423	.408	.895	1.1	.5	.2	.1	4.5
Andre Jackson Jr.	57	8	10.0	.500	.370	.727	2.0	.9	.3	.1	2.2
Damian Lillard	73	73	35.3	.424	.354	.920	4.4	7.0	1.0	.2	24.3
Chris Livingston	21	0	4.3	.500	.200	.750	1.0	.2	.1	.0	1.2
Brook Lopez	79	79	30.5	.485	.366	.821	5.2	1.6	.5	2.4	12.5
Robin Lopez	16	2	4.1	.368	.250	1.000	.3	.3	.1	.2	1.1
Khris Middleton	55	55	27.0	.493	.381	.833	4.7	5.3	.9	.3	15.1
Cameron Payne^{†}	47	2	14.9	.455	.397	.841	1.3	2.3	.5	.1	6.2
Bobby Portis	82	4	24.5	.508	.407	.790	7.4	1.3	.8	.4	13.8
Ryan Rollins^{†}	3	0	4.0	.500	1.000		.7	1.0	.7	.0	1.0
TyTy Washington Jr.	11	0	5.1	.300	.333		.5	.5	.3	.0	1.3
Lindell Wigginton	3	0	2.7	.400	.000	1.000	.0	.0	.0	.0	2.0

=== Playoffs ===
Milwaukee Bucks statistics
Player	GP	GS	MPG	FG%	3P%	FT%	RPG	APG	SPG	BPG	PPG
Thanasis Antetokounmpo	2	0	2.5				.0	.0	.5	.5	.0
Malik Beasley	6	2	21.8	.512	.440		2.5	.7	.7	.0	8.8
MarJon Beauchamp	4	0	2.5	.250	.000	.500	.3	.5	.0	.0	.8
Patrick Beverley	6	6	35.0	.410	.364	.867	3.3	5.5	1.0	.7	8.2
Pat Connaughton	6	0	20.7	.440	.273	1.000	3.8	2.2	1.0	.2	4.5
Jae Crowder	4	0	10.5	.250	.143	1.000	1.5	.5	.0	.5	2.3
Danilo Gallinari	3	0	12.3	.500	.000	.750	3.0	.7	.0	.0	3.7
A. J. Green	6	0	11.2	.375	.182	1.000	1.5	.3	.0	.0	2.8
Andre Jackson Jr.	5	0	12.0	.455	.333		2.2	2.0	1.0	.2	2.4
Damian Lillard	4	4	39.0	.420	.417	.974	3.3	5.0	1.0	.0	31.3
Chris Livingston	2	0	3.0	1.000		.000	.0	.0	.0	.0	1.0
Brook Lopez	6	6	33.3	.587	.435	.533	4.3	1.8	.0	1.3	17.7
Khris Middleton	6	6	38.3	.482	.355	.900	9.2	4.7	.5	.2	24.7
Bobby Portis	6	6	31.2	.484	.250	.615	11.3	1.0	.5	.2	16.5

- ^{†} Denotes player spent time with another team in the season. Stats reflect time with the Bucks only.

== Transactions ==
=== Free agency ===
==== Re-signed ====
Date	Player	Contract terms	Ref.
July 1	Khris Middleton	3 years $102M	
July 1	Brook Lopez	2 years $48M	
July 3	Jae Crowder	1 year minimum	

==== Additions ====
Date	Player	Contract terms	Former team	Ref.
June 23	Drew Timme	Two-way contract	Gonzaga Bulldogs	
June 23	Omari Moore	Two-way contract	San Jose State Spartans	
July 3	Malik Beasley	1 year $2.7M	Los Angeles Lakers	

==== Subtractions ====
Date	Player	Reason left	New team	Ref.
July 1	Joe Ingles	Free agency	Orlando Magic	
July 3	Jevon Carter	Free agency	Chicago Bulls	
