= 2023–24 Boston Celtics season =

2023–24 NBA season by team

- NBA champions
- Conference champions
- Division champions
- Head coach: Joe Mazzulla
- General manager: Brad Stevens
- Owners: Wyc Grousbeck
- Arena: TD Garden

Results
- Record: 64–18 (.780)
- Place: Division: 1st (Atlantic); Conference: 1st (Eastern)
- Playoff finish: NBA champions (defeated Mavericks 4–1)
- Stats at Basketball Reference

Local media
- Television: NBC Sports Boston
- Radio: WBZ-FM

The 2023–24 Boston Celtics season was the franchise's 78th season in the National Basketball Association (NBA).

The Celtics won the East Group C in the inaugural 2023 NBA In-Season Tournament by going 3–1 in the group stage and winning a three-way tiebreaker via point differential. However, they were eliminated from the tournament with a loss to the Indiana Pacers in the quarterfinals.

The Celtics had the best record (64–18) in the NBA and proceeded through the playoffs in dominant fashion. They defeated the Dallas Mavericks in five games during the NBA Finals, winning the franchise's first championship since 2008, and 18th championship in team history, breaking a tie with the Los Angeles Lakers to hold the NBA record for most championships. The result was the most dominant Celtics championship run since 1965, with only three losses in the playoffs and a season total of 80 wins, the second-best mark in franchise history.

Following their championship victory, multiple commentators considered the 2023–24 Celtics to be among the greatest teams in NBA history. With a playoff record of 16–3, the Celtics were second only to the 2016–17 Golden State Warriors for the best postseason record since all four NBA playoff rounds became best-of-seven contests in 2003. This record, however, would only be matched two years later by the New York Knicks.

The Celtics drew an average home attendance of 19,156 in 41 home games in the 2023–24 NBA season.

== Season summary ==
This was the Celtics' first season without veteran Celtic and point guard Marcus Smart since 2014. In June 2023, he was traded to the Memphis Grizzlies in a three-team trade to acquire forward Kristaps Porziņģis of the Washington Wizards. On October 1, 2023, the Celtics sent guard Malcolm Brogdon, center/forward Robert Williams III, a protected 2024 first-round pick (acquired from the Golden State Warriors), and an unprotected 2029 first-round pick to the Portland Trail Blazers in exchange for two-time All-Star guard Jrue Holiday. On March 14, 2024, the Celtics became the first team to clinch a playoff berth with their 117–107 victory over the Phoenix Suns and the Philadelphia 76ers' 114–105 loss to the Milwaukee Bucks. Six days later, the Celtics won the Atlantic Division championship for the third consecutive season, following a 122–119 victory over the Bucks during a 7-game winning streak. On March 23, the Celtics clinched the #1-seed in the Eastern Conference for the first time since 2017 after they beat the Chicago Bulls.

On April 3, 2024, the Celtics defeated the Oklahoma City Thunder with a 135–100 victory, clinching the best record in the NBA and securing a home-court advantage throughout the entire playoffs for the first time since 2008. It was also the first time the Celtics won 60 or more regular season games since 2009. The Celtics finished the season with a 64–18 record, 14 games higher than the second-place team in the Atlantic Division and the entire Eastern Conference, the New York Knicks.

In the playoffs, the Celtics dispatched the Miami Heat and Cleveland Cavaliers in five games each, and swept the Indiana Pacers to reach their second NBA Finals in three years, where the Celtics faced the Dallas Mavericks. Upon reaching the Finals, Porziņģis returned to action after missing nearly the entire playoffs up until that point. However, he suffered what was described as a "rare" ankle injury in Game 2 and missed the next two games. The Celtics raced out to a second consecutive 3–0 series lead. After a 122–84 blowout loss in Game 4, they returned to Boston and won Game 5 to win their first title since 2008. The Celtics are the first team to have the best regular-season record and win the title since the Golden State Warriors in 2017.

== Draft ==
Round	Pick	Player	Position	Nationality	College
2	35	Julian Phillips	Small forward	United States	Tennessee (Fr.)

The Celtics had a second-round pick in the 2023 NBA draft; the pick originally belonged to the Portland Trail Blazers and acquired from the Atlanta Hawks in 2021. The team traded their first-round pick to the Indiana Pacers as part of a deal to acquire Malcolm Brogdon, as the pick lost its top-12 protection when Boston made the 2023 NBA playoffs.

The Celtics used their only pick to select Julian Phillips, subsequently trading his rights to the Washington Wizards as part of the three-team trade for Kristaps Porziņģis. Phillips was then traded again on draft night to the Chicago Bulls.

== Roster ==
2023–24 Boston Celtics roster
Players

Pos.	No.	Player	Height	Weight	DOB	From
F	12	Oshae Brissett	6 ft 7 in (2.01 m)	210 lb (95 kg)	1998-06-20	Syracuse
G/F	7	Jaylen Brown	6 ft 6 in (1.98 m)	223 lb (101 kg)	1996-10-24	California
G	20	JD Davison (TW)	6 ft 1 in (1.85 m)	195 lb (88 kg)	2002-10-03	Alabama
F	30	Sam Hauser	6 ft 7 in (2.01 m)	217 lb (98 kg)	1997-12-08	Virginia
G	4	Jrue Holiday	6 ft 4 in (1.93 m)	205 lb (93 kg)	1990-06-12	UCLA
F/C	42	Al Horford	6 ft 9 in (2.06 m)	240 lb (109 kg)	1986-06-03	Florida
C	40	Luke Kornet	7 ft 2 in (2.18 m)	250 lb (113 kg)	1995-07-15	Vanderbilt
G/F	50	Sviatoslav Mykhailiuk	6 ft 7 in (2.01 m)	205 lb (93 kg)	1997-06-10	Kansas
F	13	Drew Peterson (TW)	6 ft 9 in (2.06 m)	205 lb (93 kg)	1999-11-09	USC
F/C	8	Kristaps Porziņģis	7 ft 3 in (2.21 m)	240 lb (109 kg)	1995-08-02	Latvia
G	11	Payton Pritchard	6 ft 1 in (1.85 m)	195 lb (88 kg)	1998-01-28	Oregon
C	88	Neemias Queta	7 ft 0 in (2.13 m)	248 lb (112 kg)	1999-07-13	Utah State
G	44	Jaden Springer	6 ft 4 in (1.93 m)	202 lb (92 kg)	2002-09-25	Tennessee
F	0	Jayson Tatum	6 ft 8 in (2.03 m)	210 lb (95 kg)	1998-03-03	Duke
F/C	26	Xavier Tillman	6 ft 7 in (2.01 m)	245 lb (111 kg)	1999-01-12	Michigan State
G/F	27	Jordan Walsh	6 ft 6 in (1.98 m)	205 lb (93 kg)	2004-03-03	Arkansas
G	9	Derrick White	6 ft 4 in (1.93 m)	190 lb (86 kg)	1994-07-02	Colorado

Coaches
Head coach
- Joe Mazzulla
Assistant(s)
- Sam Cassell
- Tony Dobbins
- Amile Jefferson
- Charles Lee
- D. J. MacLeay
- Matt Reynolds

Legend
- (DP) Unsigned draft pick
- (FA) Free agent
- (S) Suspended
- (GL) On assignment to G League affiliate
- (TW) Two-way affiliate player
- Injured

Roster
Updated: April 16, 2024

== Standings ==
=== Division ===
Atlantic Division	W	L	PCT	GB	Home	Road	Div	GP
z – Boston Celtics	64	18	.780	–	37‍–‍4	27‍–‍14	15‍–‍2	82
x – New York Knicks	50	32	.610	14.0	27‍–‍14	23‍–‍18	12‍–‍5	82
x – Philadelphia 76ers	47	35	.573	17.0	25‍–‍16	22‍–‍19	8‍–‍8	82
Brooklyn Nets	32	50	.390	32.0	20‍–‍21	12‍–‍29	5‍–‍11	82
Toronto Raptors	25	57	.305	39.0	14‍–‍27	11‍–‍30	1‍–‍15	82

=== Conference ===
Eastern Conference
#	Team	W	L	PCT	GB	GP
1	z – Boston Celtics *	64	18	.780	–	82
2	x – New York Knicks	50	32	.610	14.0	82
3	y – Milwaukee Bucks *	49	33	.598	15.0	82
4	x – Cleveland Cavaliers	48	34	.585	16.0	82
5	y – Orlando Magic *	47	35	.573	17.0	82
6	x – Indiana Pacers	47	35	.573	17.0	82
7	x – Philadelphia 76ers	47	35	.573	17.0	82
8	x – Miami Heat	46	36	.561	18.0	82
9	pi – Chicago Bulls	39	43	.476	25.0	82
10	pi – Atlanta Hawks	36	46	.439	28.0	82
11	Brooklyn Nets	32	50	.390	32.0	82
12	Toronto Raptors	25	57	.305	39.0	82
13	Charlotte Hornets	21	61	.256	43.0	82
14	Washington Wizards	15	67	.183	49.0	82
15	Detroit Pistons	14	68	.171	50.0	82

== Game log ==
=== Preseason ===
2023 preseason game log
Total: 4–1 (home: 2–0; road: 2–1)
Preseason: 4–1 (home: 2–0; road: 2–1)

Game	Date	Team	Score	High points	High rebounds	High assists	Location Attendance	Record
1	October 8	Philadelphia	W 114–106	Payton Pritchard (26)	Jayson Tatum (10)	Jayson Tatum (5)	TD Garden; 19,156	1–0
2	October 9	@ New York	L 107–114	Payton Pritchard (21)	Hauser, Stevens (8)	Payton Pritchard (5)	Madison Square Garden; 19,512	1–1
3	October 11	@ Philadelphia	W 112–101	Payton Pritchard (17)	Brissett, Mykhailiuk (6)	Derrick White (4)	Wells Fargo Center; 20,497	2–1
4	October 17	New York	W 123–110	Jayson Tatum (28)	Porziņģis, Tatum (8)	Jaylen Brown (6)	TD Garden; 19,156	3–1
5	October 19	@ Charlotte	W 127–99	Jaylen Brown (20)	Kristaps Porziņģis (12)	Payton Pritchard (8)	Spectrum Center; 12,590	4–1

2023–24 preseason schedule

=== Regular season ===
This became the first regular season where all the NBA teams competed in a mid-season tournament setting due to the implementation of the 2023 NBA In-Season Tournament.

2023–24 game log
Total: 64–18 (Home: 37–4; Road: 27–14)
October: 3–0 (home: 1–0; road: 2–0)

Game	Date	Team	Score	High points	High rebounds	High assists	Location Attendance	Record
1	October 25	@ New York	W 108–104	Jayson Tatum (34)	Jayson Tatum (11)	Jaylen Brown (5)	Madison Square Garden; 19,812	1–0
2	October 27	Miami	W 119–111	Derrick White (28)	Holiday, Horford (10)	Jrue Holiday (7)	TD Garden; 19,156	2–0
3	October 30	@ Washington	W 126–107	Jaylen Brown (36)	Sam Hauser (8)	Derrick White (8)	Capital One Arena; 17,898	3–0

November: 11–4 (home: 7–0; road: 4–4)

Game	Date	Team	Score	High points	High rebounds	High assists	Location Attendance	Record
4	November 1	Indiana	W 155–104	Jayson Tatum (30)	Jayson Tatum (12)	Payton Pritchard (9)	TD Garden; 19,156	4–0
5	November 4	@ Brooklyn	W 124–114	Jayson Tatum (32)	Jayson Tatum (11)	Jrue Holiday (10)	Barclays Center; 17,983	5–0
6	November 6	@ Minnesota	L 109–114 (OT)	Jayson Tatum (32)	Jrue Holiday (11)	Jrue Holiday (6)	Target Center; 18,024	5–1
7	November 8	@ Philadelphia	L 103–106	Kristaps Porziņģis (29)	Jayson Tatum (15)	Jayson Tatum (6)	Wells Fargo Center; 19,953	5–2
8	November 10	Brooklyn	W 121–107	Jaylen Brown (28)	Jrue Holiday (12)	Jrue Holiday (9)	TD Garden; 19,156	6–2
9	November 11	Toronto	W 114–97	Jaylen Brown (29)	Horford, Porziņģis (7)	Jrue Holiday (7)	TD Garden; 19,156	7–2
10	November 13	New York	W 114–98	Jayson Tatum (35)	Jrue Holiday (7)	Jayson Tatum (7)	TD Garden; 19,156	8–2
11	November 15	@ Philadelphia	W 117–107	Jayson Tatum (29)	Jrue Holiday (10)	Jayson Tatum (6)	Wells Fargo Center; 19,773	9–2
12	November 17	@ Toronto	W 108–105	Jaylen Brown (23)	Kristaps Porziņģis (12)	Holiday, Porziņģis, White (5)	Scotiabank Arena; 19,800	10–2
13	November 19	@ Memphis	W 102–100	Kristaps Porzinģis (26)	Jayson Tatum (9)	Jayson Tatum (5)	FedExForum; 17,798	11–2
14	November 20	@ Charlotte	L 118–121 (OT)	Jayson Tatum (45)	Jayson Tatum (13)	Jayson Tatum (6)	Spectrum Center; 19,134	11–3
15	November 22	Milwaukee	W 119–116	Jaylen Brown (26)	Jayson Tatum (11)	Jaylen Brown (8)	TD Garden; 19,156	12–3
16	November 24	@ Orlando	L 96–113	Jayson Tatum (26)	Luke Kornet (6)	Derrick White (4)	Amway Center; 18,846	12–4
17	November 26	Atlanta	W 113–103	Jayson Tatum (34)	Al Horford (15)	Derrick White (11)	TD Garden; 19,156	13–4
18	November 28	Chicago	W 124–97	Jaylen Brown (30)	Sam Hauser (10)	Jrue Holiday (9)	TD Garden; 19,156	14–4

December: 12–2 (home: 8–0; road: 4–2)

Game	Date	Team	Score	High points	High rebounds	High assists	Location Attendance	Record
19	December 1	Philadelphia	W 125–119	Tatum, White (21)	Jayson Tatum (7)	Jrue Holiday (6)	TD Garden; 19,156	15–4
20	December 4	@ Indiana	L 112–122	Jayson Tatum (32)	Jayson Tatum (12)	Derrick White (8)	Gainbridge Fieldhouse; 16,693	15–5
21	December 8	New York	W 133–123	Derrick White (30)	Al Horford (10)	Holiday, Tatum (5)	TD Garden; 19,156	16–5
22	December 12	Cleveland	W 120–113	Brown, Tatum (25)	Tatum, Porziņģis (10)	Jayson Tatum (5)	TD Garden; 19,156	17–5
23	December 14	Cleveland	W 116–107	Jayson Tatum (27)	Jayson Tatum (11)	Jaylen Brown (5)	TD Garden; 19,156	18–5
24	December 15	Orlando	W 128–111	Jayson Tatum (30)	Sam Hauser (7)	Derrick White (8)	TD Garden; 19,156	19–5
25	December 17	Orlando	W 114–97	Jaylen Brown (31)	Kristaps Porziņģis (10)	Jaylen Brown (6)	TD Garden; 19,156	20–5
26	December 19	@ Golden State	L 126–132 (OT)	Derrick White (30)	Al Horford (12)	Brown, Tatum (7)	Chase Center; 18,064	20–6
27	December 20	@ Sacramento	W 144–119	Brown, White (28)	Kristaps Porziņģis (9)	Jrue Holiday (10)	Golden 1 Center; 17,874	21–6
28	December 23	@ L.A. Clippers	W 145–108	Jayson Tatum (30)	Neemias Queta (12)	Jrue Holiday (7)	Crypto.com Arena; 19,370	22–6
29	December 25	@ L.A. Lakers	W 126–115	Kristaps Porziņģis (28)	Kristaps Porziņģis (11)	Derrick White (11)	Crypto.com Arena; 18,997	23–6
30	December 28	Detroit	W 128–122 (OT)	Kristaps Porziņģis (35)	Jrue Holiday (9)	Jayson Tatum (10)	TD Garden; 19,156	24–6
31	December 29	Toronto	W 120–118	Jaylen Brown (31)	Jaylen Brown (10)	Derrick White (7)	TD Garden; 19,156	25–6
32	December 31	@ San Antonio	W 134–101	Jayson Tatum (25)	Kristaps Porziņģis (9)	Payton Pritchard (7)	Frost Bank Center; 18,886	26–6

January: 11–5 (home: 6–2; road: 5–3)

Game	Date	Team	Score	High points	High rebounds	High assists	Location Attendance	Record
33	January 2	@ Oklahoma City	L 123–127	Kristaps Porziņģis (34)	Jayson Tatum (13)	Jayson Tatum (8)	Paycom Center; 18,203	26–7
34	January 5	Utah	W 126–97	Jayson Tatum (30)	Jayson Tatum (9)	Brown, Tatum (5)	TD Garden; 19,156	27–7
35	January 6	@ Indiana	W 118–101	Jayson Tatum (38)	Jayson Tatum (13)	Al Horford (8)	Gainbridge Fieldhouse; 16,693	28–7
36	January 8	@ Indiana	L 131–133	Jaylen Brown (40)	Payton Pritchard (7)	Kristaps Porziņģis (7)	Gainbridge Fieldhouse; 16,009	28–8
37	January 10	Minnesota	W 127–120 (OT)	Jayson Tatum (45)	Jaylen Brown (11)	Derrick White (6)	TD Garden; 19,156	29–8
38	January 11	@ Milwaukee	L 102–135	Payton Pritchard (21)	five players (4)	Porziņģis, Pritchard (4)	Fiserv Forum; 17,781	29–9
39	January 13	Houston	W 145–113	Jaylen Brown (32)	Jayson Tatum (8)	three players (5)	TD Garden; 19,156	30–9
40	January 15	@ Toronto	W 105–96	Holiday, White (22)	Jayson Tatum (14)	Jrue Holiday (7)	Scotiabank Arena; 19,278	31–9
41	January 17	San Antonio	W 117–98	Jayson Tatum (24)	Luke Kornet (9)	Jaylen Brown (5)	TD Garden; 19,156	32–9
42	January 19	Denver	L 100–102	Derrick White (24)	Al Horford (10)	Tatum, White (5)	TD Garden; 19,156	32–10
43	January 21	@ Houston	W 116–107	Kristaps Porziņģis (32)	Brown, White (11)	Jaylen Brown (10)	Toyota Center; 18,055	33–10
44	January 22	@ Dallas	W 119–110	Jayson Tatum (39)	Jayson Tatum (11)	Holiday, Pritchard (6)	American Airlines Center; 20,277	34–10
45	January 25	@ Miami	W 143–110	Jayson Tatum (26)	Jayson Tatum (8)	Horford, White (6)	Kaseya Center; 20,074	35–10
46	January 27	L.A. Clippers	L 96–115	Jayson Tatum (21)	Jayson Tatum (11)	Jrue Holiday (4)	TD Garden; 19,156	35–11
47	January 29	New Orleans	W 118–112	Jayson Tatum (28)	Jaylen Brown (11)	Jayson Tatum (8)	TD Garden; 19,156	36–11
48	January 30	Indiana	W 129–124	Jayson Tatum (30)	Kristaps Porziņģis (12)	Jayson Tatum (7)	TD Garden; 19,156	37–11

February: 9–1 (home: 5–1; road: 4–0)

Game	Date	Team	Score	High points	High rebounds	High assists	Location Attendance	Record
49	February 1	L.A. Lakers	L 105–114	Jayson Tatum (23)	Al Horford (9)	Brown, Holiday (7)	TD Garden; 19,156	37–12
50	February 4	Memphis	W 131–91	Jayson Tatum (34)	four players (8)	Jayson Tatum (7)	TD Garden; 19,156	38–12
51	February 7	Atlanta	W 125–117	Kristaps Porziņģis (31)	Jayson Tatum (9)	Al Horford (8)	TD Garden; 19,156	39–12
52	February 9	Washington	W 133–129	Jayson Tatum (35)	Kristaps Porziņģis (11)	Jayson Tatum (8)	TD Garden; 19,156	40–12
53	February 11	@ Miami	W 110–106	Jayson Tatum (26)	Jayson Tatum (10)	Jayson Tatum (9)	Kaseya Center; 20,049	41–12
54	February 13	@ Brooklyn	W 118–110	Jayson Tatum (41)	Jayson Tatum (14)	Jrue Holiday (12)	Barclays Center; 18,053	42–12
55	February 14	Brooklyn	W 136–86	Payton Pritchard (28)	Luke Kornet (8)	Jayson Tatum (9)	TD Garden; 19,156	43–12
All-Star Break
56	February 22	@ Chicago	W 129–112	Derrick White (28)	Jayson Tatum (7)	Jrue Holiday (6)	United Center; 20,313	44–12
57	February 24	@ New York	W 116–102	Jaylen Brown (30)	Jaylen Brown (8)	three players (6)	Madison Square Garden; 19,812	45–12
58	February 27	Philadelphia	W 117–99	Jaylen Brown (31)	Kristaps Porziņģis (12)	Jayson Tatum (8)	TD Garden; 19,156	46–12

March: 12–4 (home: 5–0; road: 7–4)

Game	Date	Team	Score	High points	High rebounds	High assists	Location Attendance	Record
59	March 1	Dallas	W 138–110	Jayson Tatum (32)	Horford, Tatum (8)	Derrick White (8)	TD Garden; 19,156	47–12
60	March 3	Golden State	W 140–88	Jaylen Brown (29)	Oshae Brissett (8)	Derrick White (8)	TD Garden; 19,156	48–12
61	March 5	@ Cleveland	L 104–105	Jayson Tatum (26)	Jayson Tatum (13)	Derrick White (7)	Rocket Mortgage FieldHouse; 19,432	48–13
62	March 7	@ Denver	L 109–115	Jaylen Brown (41)	Jaylen Brown (14)	Jayson Tatum (8)	Ball Arena; 19,855	48–14
63	March 9	@ Phoenix	W 117–107	Jayson Tatum (29)	Al Horford (12)	Derrick White (9)	Footprint Center; 17,071	49–14
64	March 11	@ Portland	W 121–99	Jaylen Brown (27)	Payton Pritchard (8)	Tatum, Pritchard (8)	Moda Center; 18,480	50–14
65	March 12	@ Utah	W 123–107	Jayson Tatum (38)	Luke Kornet (9)	Jrue Holiday (8)	Delta Center; 18,206	51–14
66	March 14	Phoenix	W 127–112	Jaylen Brown (37)	Derrick White (8)	Jrue Holiday (10)	TD Garden; 19,156	52–14
67	March 17	@ Washington	W 130–104	Hauser, Tatum (30)	Hauser, Kornet, Tatum (6)	Payton Pritchard (13)	Capital One Arena; 20,333	53–14
68	March 18	Detroit	W 119–94	Jaylen Brown (31)	Kornet, White (10)	Derrick White (10)	TD Garden; 19,156	54–14
69	March 20	Milwaukee	W 122–119	Jayson Tatum (31)	Brown, Tatum (8)	Derrick White (8)	TD Garden; 19,156	55–14
70	March 22	@ Detroit	W 129–102	Jaylen Brown (33)	Derrick White (8)	Derrick White (11)	Little Caesars Arena; 19,994	56–14
71	March 23	@ Chicago	W 124–113	Jayson Tatum (26)	Luke Kornet (13)	Payton Pritchard (8)	United Center; 21,198	57–14
72	March 25	@ Atlanta	L 118–120	Jayson Tatum (37)	Al Horford (9)	Payton Pritchard (6)	State Farm Arena; 17,405	57–15
73	March 28	@ Atlanta	L 122–123 (OT)	Jayson Tatum (31)	Jayson Tatum (13)	Jayson Tatum (6)	State Farm Arena; 17,743	57–16
74	March 30	@ New Orleans	W 104–92	Jayson Tatum (23)	Kristaps Porziņģis (10)	Jrue Holiday (7)	Smoothie King Center; 17,932	58–16

April: 6–2 (home: 5–1; road: 1–1)

Game	Date	Team	Score	High points	High rebounds	High assists	Location Attendance	Record
75	April 1	@ Charlotte	W 118–104	Hauser, Tatum (25)	Jayson Tatum (10)	Porziņģis, Pritchard, White (5)	Spectrum Center; 19,238	59–16
76	April 3	Oklahoma City	W 135–100	Kristaps Porziņģis (27)	Kristaps Porziņģis (12)	Payton Pritchard (8)	TD Garden; 19,156	60–16
77	April 5	Sacramento	W 101–100	Payton Pritchard (21)	Kristaps Porziņģis (11)	Jrue Holiday (7)	TD Garden	61–16
78	April 7	Portland	W 124–107	Jaylen Brown (26)	Kristaps Porziņģis (10)	Derrick White (9)	TD Garden; 19,156	62–16
79	April 9	@ Milwaukee	L 91–104	Jayson Tatum (22)	Jaylen Brown (10)	Jayson Tatum (6)	Fiserv Forum; 17,493	62–17
80	April 11	New York	L 109–118	Jayson Tatum (18)	Kristaps Porziņģis (8)	Jayson Tatum (7)	TD Garden; 19,156	62–18
81	April 12	Charlotte	W 131–98	Payton Pritchard (31)	Oshae Brissett (11)	Payton Pritchard (11)	TD Garden; 19,156	63–18
82	April 14	Washington	W 132–122	Payton Pritchard (38)	Pritchard, Queta (9)	Payton Pritchard (12)	TD Garden; 19,156	64–18

2023–24 season schedule

=== Playoffs ===
2024 playoff game log
Total: 16–3 (home: 9–2; road: 7–1)
First Round: 4–1 (home: 2–1; road: 2–0)

Game	Date	Team	Score	High points	High rebounds	High assists	Location Attendance	Series
1	April 21	Miami	W 114–94	Jayson Tatum (23)	Jayson Tatum (10)	Jayson Tatum (10)	TD Garden; 19,156	1–0
2	April 24	Miami	L 101–111	Jaylen Brown (33)	four players (8)	White, Porziņģis (4)	TD Garden; 19,156	1–1
3	April 27	@ Miami	W 104–84	Brown, Tatum (22)	Jayson Tatum (11)	Tatum, Holiday (6)	Kaseya Center; 20,092	2–1
4	April 29	@ Miami	W 102–88	Derrick White (38)	Jayson Tatum (11)	Jrue Holiday (6)	Kaseya Center; 19,600	3–1
5	May 1	Miami	W 118–84	Brown, White (25)	Jayson Tatum (12)	Jrue Holiday (5)	TD Garden; 19,156	4–1

Conference Semifinals: 4–1 (home: 2–1; road: 2–0)

Game	Date	Team	Score	High points	High rebounds	High assists	Location Attendance	Series
1	May 7	Cleveland	W 120–95	Jaylen Brown (32)	Jayson Tatum (11)	Tatum, White (5)	TD Garden; 19,156	1–0
2	May 9	Cleveland	L 94–118	Jayson Tatum (25)	Jayson Tatum (7)	Jayson Tatum (6)	TD Garden; 19,156	1–1
3	May 11	@ Cleveland	W 106–93	Jayson Tatum (33)	Jayson Tatum (13)	Jayson Tatum (6)	Rocket Mortgage FieldHouse; 19,432	2–1
4	May 13	@ Cleveland	W 109–102	Jayson Tatum (33)	Jayson Tatum (11)	Holiday, Tatum (5)	Rocket Mortgage FieldHouse; 19,432	3–1
5	May 15	Cleveland	W 113–98	Jayson Tatum (25)	Al Horford (15)	Jayson Tatum (9)	TD Garden; 19,156	4–1

Conference Finals: 4–0 (home: 2–0; road: 2–0)

Game	Date	Team	Score	High points	High rebounds	High assists	Location Attendance	Series
1	May 21	Indiana	W 133–128 (OT)	Jayson Tatum (36)	Jayson Tatum (12)	Derrick White (9)	TD Garden; 19,156	1–0
2	May 23	Indiana	W 126–110	Jaylen Brown (40)	Al Horford (10)	Jrue Holiday (10)	TD Garden; 19,156	2–0
3	May 25	@ Indiana	W 114–111	Jayson Tatum (36)	Jayson Tatum (10)	Jayson Tatum (8)	Gainbridge Fieldhouse; 17,274	3–0
4	May 27	@ Indiana	W 105–102	Jaylen Brown (29)	Jayson Tatum (13)	Jayson Tatum (8)	Gainbridge Fieldhouse; 17,274	4–0

NBA Finals: 4–1 (home: 3–0; road: 1–1)

Game	Date	Team	Score	High points	High rebounds	High assists	Location Attendance	Series
1	June 6	Dallas	W 107–89	Jaylen Brown (22)	Jayson Tatum (11)	Holiday, Tatum, White (5)	TD Garden; 19,156	1–0
2	June 9	Dallas	W 105–98	Jrue Holiday (26)	Jrue Holiday (11)	Jayson Tatum (12)	TD Garden; 19,156	2–0
3	June 12	@ Dallas	W 106–99	Jayson Tatum (31)	Jaylen Brown (8)	Jaylen Brown (8)	American Airlines Center; 20,311	3–0
4	June 14	@ Dallas	L 84–122	Jayson Tatum (15)	Jayson Tatum (5)	Al Horford (4)	American Airlines Center; 20,277	3–1
5	June 17	Dallas	W 106–88	Jayson Tatum (31)	Jrue Holiday (11)	Jayson Tatum (11)	TD Garden; 19,156	4–1

2024 playoff schedule

=== In-Season Tournament ===
This was the first regular season where all NBA teams competed in a mid-season tournament setting with the implementation of the 2023 NBA In-Season Tournament. During the in-season tournament period, the Celtics played in Group C of the Eastern Conference with the Brooklyn Nets, Toronto Raptors, Chicago Bulls, and Orlando Magic.

==== East group C ====
Pos	Team	Pld	W	L	PF	PA	PD	Qualification	BOS	ORL	BKN	TOR	CHI
1	Boston Celtics	4	3 (Note: Tied on head-to-head results. Overall point difference is used as the tiebreaker.)	1	449	422	+27	Advance to knockout stage	—	96–113	121–107	108–105	124–97
2	Orlando Magic	4	3	1	446	424	+22		113–96	—	104–124	126–107	103–97
3	Brooklyn Nets	4	3	1	455	435	+20		107–121	124–104	—	115–103	109–107
4	Toronto Raptors	4	1	3	436	457	−21		105–108	107–126	103–115	—	121–108
5	Chicago Bulls	4	0	4	409	457	−48		97–124	97–103	107–109	108–121	—

Source: NBA
Rules for classification: Tiebreakers
Notes:

2023–24 game log
Total: 3–2 (Home: 2–0; Road: 1–2)
In-Season Tournament: 3–2 (home: 2–0; road: 1–2)

Game	Date	Team	Score	High points	High rebounds	High assists	Location Attendance	Record
1	November 10	Brooklyn	W 121–107	Jaylen Brown (28)	Jrue Holiday (12)	Jrue Holiday (9)	TD Garden; 19,156	1–0
2	November 17	@ Toronto	W 108–105	Jaylen Brown (23)	Kristaps Porziņģis (12)	Holiday, Porziņģis, White (5)	Scotiabank Arena; 19,800	2–0
3	November 24	@ Orlando	L 96–113	Jayson Tatum (26)	Luke Kornet (6)	Derrick White (4)	Amway Center; 18,846	2–1
4	November 28	Chicago	W 124–97	Jaylen Brown (30)	Sam Hauser (10)	Jrue Holiday (9)	TD Garden; 19,156	3–1
5	December 4	@ Indiana	L 112–122	Jayson Tatum (32)	Jayson Tatum (12)	Derrick White (8)	Gainbridge Fieldhouse; 16,693	3–2

== Player statistics ==
Legend
GP	Games played	GS	Games started	MPG	Minutes per game
FG%	Field-goal percentage	3P%	3-point field-goal percentage	FT%	Free-throw percentage
RPG	Rebounds per game	APG	Assists per game	SPG	Steals per game
BPG	Blocks per game	PPG	Points per game

=== Regular season ===
Boston Celtics statistics
Player	GP	GS	MPG	FG%	3P%	FT%	RPG	APG	SPG	BPG	PPG
Dalano Banton^{†}	24	1	7.1	.373	.125	.800	1.5	.8	.2	.1	2.3
Oshae Brissett	55	1	11.5	.444	.273	.602	2.9	.8	.3	.1	3.7
Jaylen Brown	70	70	33.5	.499	.354	.703	5.5	3.6	1.2	.5	23.0
JD Davison	8	0	4.9	.417	.429	.750	1.3	1.3	.1	.1	2.0
Sam Hauser	79	13	22.0	.446	.424	.895	3.5	1.0	.5	.3	9.0
Jrue Holiday	69	69	32.8	.480	.429	.833	5.4	4.8	.9	.8	12.5
Al Horford	65	33	26.8	.511	.419	.867	6.4	2.6	.6	1.0	8.6
Luke Kornet	63	7	15.6	.700	1.000	.907	4.1	1.1	.4	1.0	5.3
Sviatoslav Mykhailiuk	41	2	10.1	.416	.389	.667	1.2	.9	.3	.0	4.0
Drew Peterson	3	0	7.7	.667	.600		.3	.3	.7	.0	3.7
Kristaps Porziņģis	57	57	29.6	.516	.375	.858	7.2	2.0	.7	1.9	20.1
Payton Pritchard	82	5	22.3	.468	.385	.821	3.2	3.4	.5	.1	9.6
Neemias Queta	28	0	11.9	.644		.714	4.4	.7	.5	.8	5.5
Jaden Springer^{†}	17	1	7.6	.433	.182	.875	1.2	.5	.6	.2	2.1
Lamar Stevens^{†}	19	1	6.4	.467	.375	.727	1.6	.4	.3	.3	2.8
Jayson Tatum	74	74	35.7	.471	.376	.833	8.1	4.9	1.0	.6	26.9
Xavier Tillman^{†}	20	2	13.7	.515	.286	.571	2.7	1.0	.5	.5	4.0
Jordan Walsh	9	1	9.2	.400	.222	.500	2.2	.6	.6	.1	1.7
Derrick White	73	73	32.6	.461	.396	.901	4.2	5.2	1.0	1.2	15.2

=== Playoffs ===
Boston Celtics statistics
Player	GP	GS	MPG	FG%	3P%	FT%	RPG	APG	SPG	BPG	PPG
Oshae Brissett	10	0	5.5	.545	1.000	.500	1.4	.0	.3	.2	1.6
Jaylen Brown	19	19	37.2	.516	.327	.660	5.9	3.3	1.2	.6	23.9
Sam Hauser	19	0	14.9	.429	.380	1.000	2.2	.6	.3	.2	5.4
Jrue Holiday	19	19	37.9	.503	.402	.955	6.1	4.4	1.1	.6	13.2
Al Horford	19	15	30.3	.478	.368	.636	7.0	2.1	.8	.8	9.2
Luke Kornet	13	0	10.2	.667		.846	3.2	.5	.1	.4	3.0
Sviatoslav Mykhailiuk	8	0	4.0	.250	.222		.6	.1	.1	.0	1.0
Kristaps Porziņģis	7	4	23.6	.467	.345	.909	4.4	1.1	.7	1.6	12.3
Payton Pritchard	19	0	18.7	.419	.383	.917	1.9	2.1	.2	.0	6.4
Neemias Queta	3	0	4.3	.667			1.0	.0	.0	.3	1.3
Jaden Springer	4	0	5.5	.667			.8	.3	.0	.3	1.0
Jayson Tatum	19	19	40.4	.427	.283	.861	9.7	6.3	1.1	.7	25.0
Xavier Tillman	8	0	8.6	.625	1.000	1.000	1.8	.4	.4	.4	1.5
Jordan Walsh	3	0	3.7	.333	.000		.7	.0	.0	.0	.7
Derrick White	19	19	35.6	.452	.404	.921	4.3	4.1	.9	1.2	16.7

- ^{†} Denotes player spent time with another team in the season. Stats reflect time with the Celtics only.

== Transactions ==
=== Trades ===
June 22, 2023	To Boston Celtics Kristaps Porziņģis (from Washington); Draft rights to Marcus Sasser (No. 25) (from Memphis); 2024 GSW first-round pick (from Memphis)	To Memphis Grizzlies Marcus Smart (from Boston)
June 22, 2023	To Washington Wizards Tyus Jones (from Memphis); Danilo Gallinari (from Boston); Mike Muscala (from Boston); Draft rights to Julian Phillips (No. 35) (from Boston)

June 22, 2023	To Boston Celtics Draft rights to James Nnaji (No. 31); 2025 second round pick (Note: The most favorable of the picks originally belonging to Detroit, Golden State and Washington.); 2027 second-round pick (Note: The most favorable of the picks originally belonging to Portland, New York, New Orleans and Minnesota.)	To Detroit Pistons Draft rights to Marcus Sasser (No. 25)

June 22, 2023
To Boston Celtics

Draft rights to Colby Jones (No. 34)

Draft rights to Mouhamed Gueye (No. 39)

To Charlotte Hornets

Draft rights to James Nnaji (No. 31)

June 22, 2023
To Boston Celtics

Draft rights to Jordan Walsh (No. 38)

2024 DAL second-round-pick

To Sacramento Kings

Draft rights to Colby Jones (No. 34)

June 22, 2023	To Boston Celtics 2027 ATL second-round-pick	To Atlanta Hawks Draft rights to Mouhamed Gueye (No. 39)

July 5, 2023
To Boston Celtics

2024 second-round pick (from San Antonio) (Note: The more favorable of the picks originally belonging to Chicago and New Orleans.)

2025 DAL second-round pick swap (from Dallas)

2030 DAL second-round pick (from Dallas)

To Dallas Mavericks

Grant Williams (from Boston)

2025 TOR second-round pick (From San Antonio)

2028 MIA second-round pick (From San Antonio)

To San Antonio Spurs

Reggie Bullock (from Dallas)

2030 DAL first-round pick swap (from Dallas)

October 1, 2023	To Boston Celtics Jrue Holiday	To Portland Trail Blazers Malcolm Brogdon; Robert Williams III; 2024 GSW first-round pick 2029 BOS first-round pick

February 7, 2024
To Boston Celtics

Xavier Tillman

To Memphis Grizzlies

Lamar Stevens
2027 ATL second-round pick
2030 DAL second-round pick

February 8, 2024
To Boston Celtics

Jaden Springer

To Philadelphia 76ers

2024 second-round pick

February 8, 2024
To Boston Celtics

2027 protected second-round pick (Note: The less favorable of the picks originally belonging to New Orleans and Portland, if No. 56–60.)

To Portland Trail Blazers

Dalano Banton

=== Free agency ===
==== Re-signed ====
Player	Signed
JD Davison	July 9

==== Additions ====
Player	Signed	Former Team
Oshae Brissett	June 30	Indiana Pacers
Sviatoslav Mykhailiuk	August 31	Charlotte Hornets
Neemias Queta	September 19	Sacramento Kings
Drew Peterson	December 13	Sioux Falls Skyforce

==== Subtractions ====
Player	Reason	New Team
Nathan Knight	Waived	Motor City Cruise
Wenyen Gabriel	Waived	Wisconsin Herd
Dalano Banton	Traded	Portland Trail Blazers
Lamar Stevens	Traded	Memphis Grizzlies
