= Terquavion Smith =

American basketball player (born 2002)

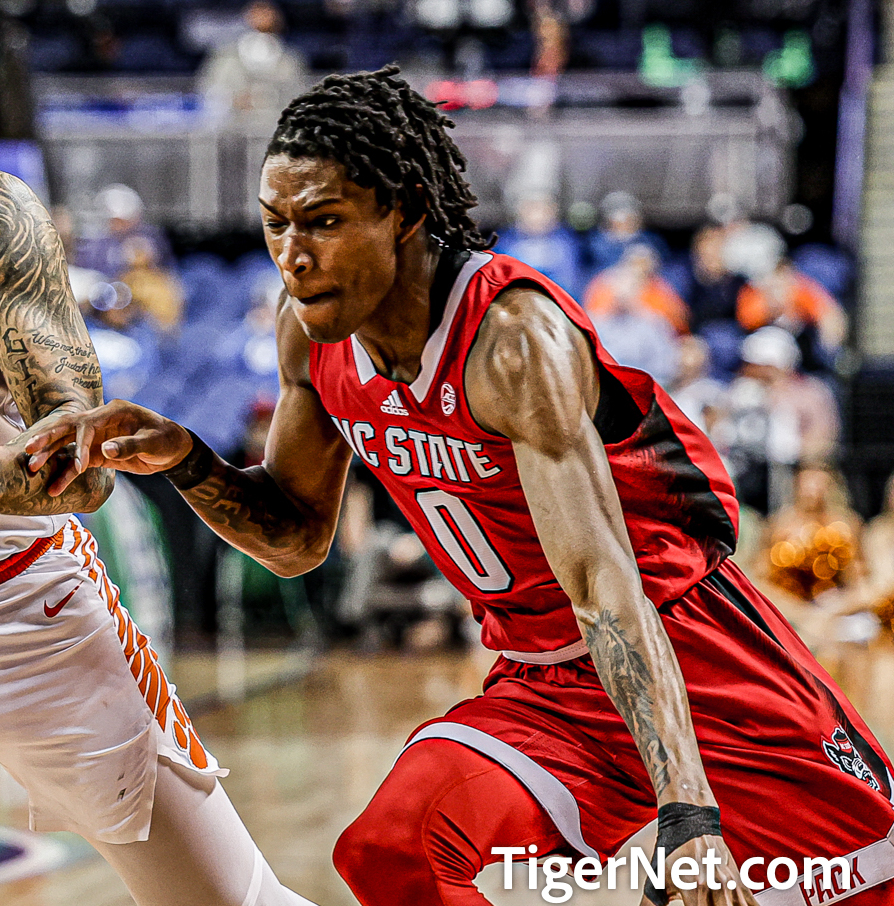
- Smith with NC State in 2023

No. 77 – Shenzhen Leopards
- Position: Shooting guard / point guard
- League: CBA

Personal information
- Born: December 31, 2002 (age 23) Greenville, North Carolina, U.S.
- Listed height: 6 ft 4 in (1.93 m)
- Listed weight: 160 lb (73 kg)

Career information
- High school: Farmville Central (Farmville, North Carolina)
- College: NC State (2021–2023)
- NBA draft: 2023: undrafted
- Playing career: 2023–present

Career history
- 2023–2024: Philadelphia 76ers
- 2023–2024: →Delaware Blue Coats
- 2024: Jiangsu Dragons
- 2025: Darüşşafaka
- 2025: Rip City Remix
- 2025: Scarborough Shooting Stars
- 2025–present: Shenzhen Leopards

Career highlights
- CBA scoring champion (2026); NBA G League All-Rookie Team (2024); Second-team All-ACC (2023); ACC All-Rookie Team (2022); North Carolina Mr. Basketball (2021)
- Stats at NBA.com
- Stats at Basketball Reference

Terquavion Lamont Smith (/tərˈkweɪviɒn/ tər-KWAY-vee-on; born December 31, 2002) is an American professional basketball player for the Shenzhen Leopards of the Chinese Basketball Association (CBA). A 6-foot-4-inch (1.93 m) combo guard, he played college basketball for the NC State Wolfpack, receiving all-Atlantic Coast Conference (ACC) honors in 2023. He was signed as an undrafted free agent on June 23, 2023.

== High school career ==
Smith attended Farmville Central High School in Farmville, North Carolina. As a senior, he averaged 25.6 points, six rebounds, 5.8 assists and 3.2 steals per game to lead Farmville Central to a perfect record. He was named the Gatorade Basketball Player of the Year for North Carolina. He committed to NC State University to play college basketball.

== College career ==
As a freshman at NC State, Smith started 25 of 32 games and averaged 16.3 points, 4.1 rebounds, and 2.1 assists per game. He hit 96 three-pointers which were the fourth most by a freshman in ACC history. He originally entered the 2022 NBA draft; however, he withdrew his name and returned to NC State for his sophomore year.

== Professional career ==
=== Philadelphia 76ers / Delaware Blue Coats (2023–2024) ===
After going undrafted in the 2023 NBA draft, Smith signed a two-way contract with the Philadelphia 76ers on July 1, 2023. On February 3, 2024, Smith scored 17 points in a game vs the Brooklyn Nets. Smith made 16 total appearances for the 76ers during the 2023–24 NBA season, recording averages of 3.3 points, 0.3 rebounds, and 0.8 assists.

=== Jiangsu Dragons (2024) ===
On September 15, 2024, Smith signed with the Jiangsu Dragons of the Chinese Basketball Association.

=== Darüşşafaka (2025) ===
On January 7, 2025, Smith signed with Darüşşafaka of the Basketbol Süper Ligi (BSL).

=== Rip City Remix (2025) ===
On March 21, 2025, Smith was claimed off waivers by the Rip City Remix.

=== Shenzhen Leopards (2025–present) ===
On December 1, 2025, Smith signed with the Shenzhen Leopards of the Chinese Basketball Association (CBA).

On October 22, 2026, Smith tested positive for cannabinoids in an in-competition test. The Chinese Basketball Association announced that Smith was suspended from competition provisionally.

== Career statistics ==
Legend
GP	Games played	GS	Games started	MPG	Minutes per game
FG%	Field goal percentage	3P%	3-point field goal percentage	FT%	Free throw percentage
RPG	Rebounds per game	APG	Assists per game	SPG	Steals per game
BPG	Blocks per game	PPG	Points per game	**Bold**	Career high

=== NBA ===
Year	Team	GP	GS	MPG	FG%	3P%	FT%	RPG	APG	SPG	BPG	PPG
2023–24	Philadelphia	16	0	5.3	.391	.371	.600	.3	.8	.5	.0	3.3
Career		16	0	5.3	.391	.371	.600	.3	.8	.5	.0	3.3

=== College ===
Year	Team	GP	GS	MPG	FG%	3P%	FT%	RPG	APG	SPG	BPG	PPG
2021–22	NC State	32	25	31.6	**.398**	**.369**	.698	**4.1**	2.1	1.3	**.5**	16.3
2022–23	NC State	**34**	**34**	**33.6**	.380	.336	**.701**	3.6	**4.1**	**1.4**	.4	**17.9**
Career		66	59	32.6	.388	.352	.700	3.8	3.1	1.4	.4	17.1
