= Jaden Springer =

American basketball player (born 2002)

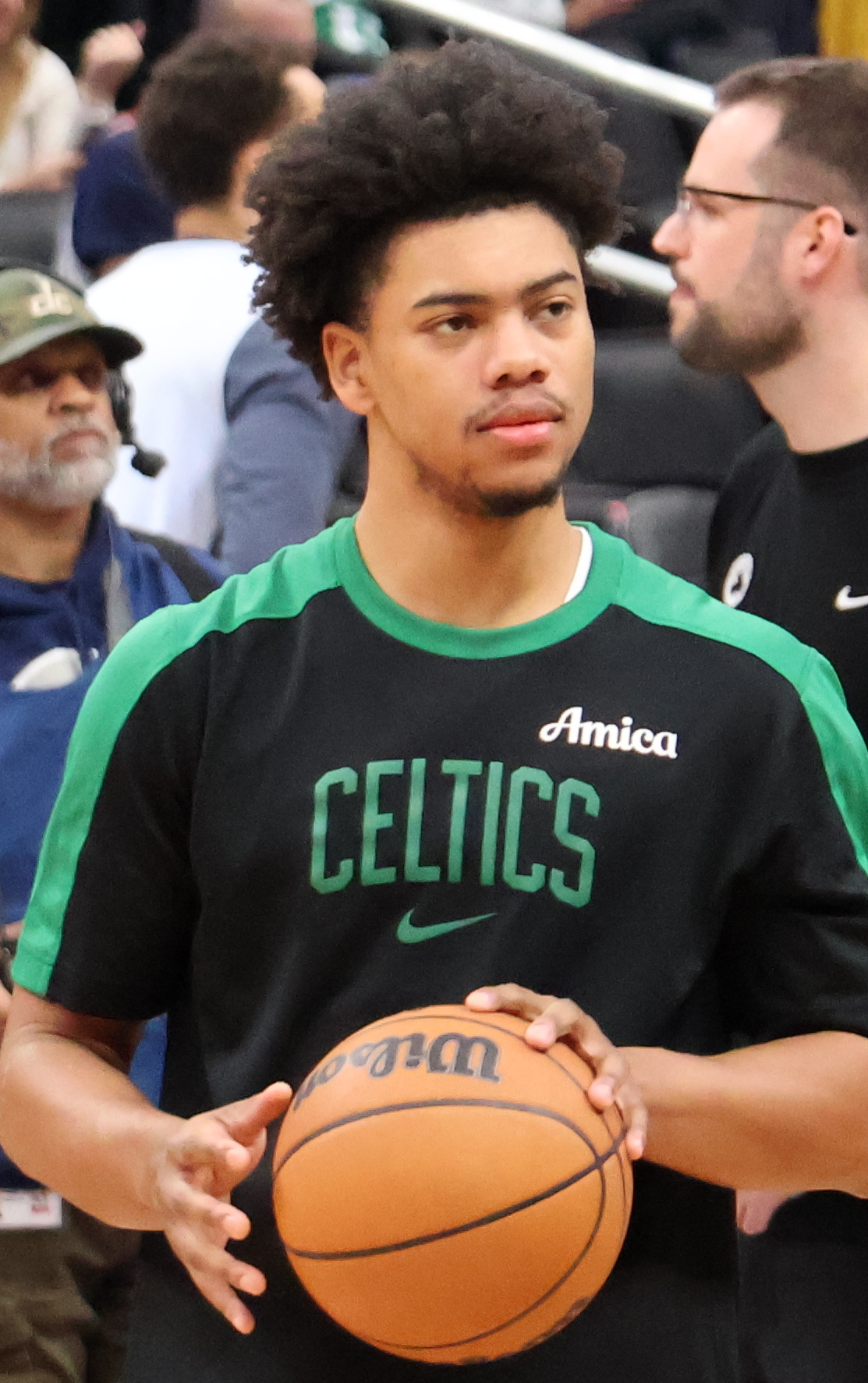
- Springer with the Boston Celtics in 2024

Free agent
- Position: Shooting guard / point guard

Personal information
- Born: September 25, 2002 (age 24) Charlotte, North Carolina, U.S.
- Listed height: 6 ft 4 in (1.93 m)
- Listed weight: 202 lb (92 kg)

Career information
- High school: Rocky River (Mint Hill, North Carolina); IMG Academy (Bradenton, Florida)
- College: Tennessee (2020–2021)
- NBA draft: 2021: 1st round, 28th overall pick
- Drafted by: Philadelphia 76ers
- Playing career: 2021–present

Career history
- 2021–2024: Philadelphia 76ers
- 2021–2023: →Delaware Blue Coats
- 2024–2025: Boston Celtics
- 2024: →Maine Celtics
- 2025: Utah Jazz
- 2025–2026: Birmingham Squadron

Career highlights
- NBA champion (2024); NBA G League champion (2023); NBA G League Finals MVP (2023); NBA G League steals leader (2023); SEC All-Freshman Team (2021); McDonald's All-American (2020)
- Stats at NBA.com
- Stats at Basketball Reference

Jaden Tyree Springer (born September 25, 2002) is an American professional basketball player who last played for the Birmingham Squadron of the NBA G League. He played college basketball for the Tennessee Volunteers. Springer was drafted by the Philadelphia 76ers in 2021. As a reserve with the 2023–24 Boston Celtics, Springer won an NBA championship.

== Early life ==
While in eighth grade, Springer played varsity basketball for Lighthouse Christian School in Antioch, Tennessee, averaging a team-high 19 points and 3.5 rebounds per game. In his first two years of high school, he played for Rocky River High School in Mint Hill, North Carolina, being drawn by head basketball coach Jermaine Walker despite academic and disciplinary concerns about the school. In his freshman season, Springer averaged 21.8 points, 9.4 rebounds and five assists per game and led his team to its first state tournament appearance. As a sophomore, he averaged 24.7 points, 10.2 rebounds, 2.4 steals and 2.4 blocks per game, helping Rocky River reach the Class 4A state semifinals. He was named Southwestern 4A Player of the Year.

Entering his junior and senior seasons, Springer transferred to IMG Academy in Bradenton, Florida. He joined one of the best teams in the country and became teammates with top recruits Armando Bacot, Josh Green and Jeremiah Robinson-Earl. As a junior, Springer averaged 15.6 points, four rebounds and four assists, helping his team win GEICO High School Nationals. He scored 26 points in a 74–73 semifinal win over Montverde Academy. In his senior season, Springer averaged 17.4 points, 5.5 rebounds and 5.1 assists per game for IMG. He played through an ankle injury throughout the season and was in turn sidelined from some games. Springer was selected to play in the McDonald's All-American Game, which was canceled due to the COVID-19 pandemic.

=== Recruiting ===
Springer began receiving scholarship offers from NCAA Division I basketball programs during his freshman season in high school. As a sophomore, he emerged as one of the best players in the 2020 class. On October 23, 2019, he committed to play college basketball for Tennessee over offers from Memphis and Michigan, among others.

College recruiting
Name	Hometown	School	Height	Weight	Commit date
Jaden Springer; SG	Charlotte, NC	IMG Academy (FL)	6 ft 5 in (1.96 m)	190 lb (86 kg)	Oct 23, 2019
Jaden Springer; SG	Recruit ratings: Rivals: 247Sports: ESPN: (94)				
Overall recruit ranking: Rivals: 16 247Sports: 16 ESPN: 17
Note: In many cases, Scout, Rivals, 247Sports, On3, and ESPN may conflict in their listings of height and weight.; In these cases, the average was taken. ESPN grades are on a 100-point scale.; Sources: "Tennessee 2020 Basketball Commitments". Rivals.; "2020 Tennessee Volunteers Recruiting Class". ESPN.; "2020 Team Ranking". Rivals.

== College career ==
On December 18, 2020, Springer recorded 21 points, six rebounds and six assists in a 103–49 win against Tennessee Tech. On February 10, 2021, he scored a career-high 30 points in an 89–81 win over Georgia. As a freshman, Springer averaged 12.5 points, 3.5 rebounds and 2.9 assists per game, earning Southeastern Conference (SEC) All-Freshman Team honors. Following the season, he declared for the 2021 NBA draft and signed with an agent.

== Professional career ==
=== Philadelphia 76ers (2021–2024) ===
Springer was selected with the 28th pick in the 2021 NBA draft by the Philadelphia 76ers. On August 4, 2021, Springer was signed by the Sixers. On October 24, 2021, Springer was assigned to the Sixers G League affiliate, the Delaware Blue Coats. Springer would spend the majority of his rookie year with the Blue Coats, playing only two regular season games for the 76ers.

In his sophomore season, Springer won the NBA G League title with the Blue Coats and was named the championship game's most valuable player.

=== Boston Celtics (2024–2025) ===
On February 8, 2024, Springer was traded to the Boston Celtics in exchange for a second-round pick. Springer became an NBA champion when the Celtics defeated the Dallas Mavericks in five games in the NBA Finals.

Springer played for Boston in the 2024 NBA Summer League, leading the Celtics with 23 points in their first game against the Miami Heat before being shut down. On Jan. 22, 2025, Springer scored 8 points and had 4 steals (tying his career high) in a 117–113 regular-season, overtime win against the Los Angeles Clippers. Though Springer had logged only 76 minutes coming into the game, Celtics coach Joe Mazzulla brought him off the bench for 20 of the final 21 minutes. Springer made a three-pointer to put the Celtics ahead 115–110 with 34 seconds left in the game.

=== Utah Jazz (2025) ===
On February 6, 2025, Springer, along with a 2030 second-round pick and a protected second-round pick in 2027, was traded to the Houston Rockets in exchange for a protected 2031 second-round pick. Later that day, Springer was waived by the Rockets. On February 20, 2025, Springer signed a 10-day contract with the Utah Jazz. On March 2, 2025, the Jazz signed Springer to a three-year deal. On July 24, 2025, Springer was waived by the Jazz.

=== Birmingham Squadron (2025–2026) ===
On July 31, 2025, Springer signed with the New Orleans Pelicans. On October 23, he was waived, after not playing in their season opener a day prior. On October 27, 2025, he joined the Birmingham Squadron of the NBA G League.

== Career statistics ==
Legend
GP	Games played	GS	Games started	MPG	Minutes per game
FG%	Field goal percentage	3P%	3-point field goal percentage	FT%	Free throw percentage
RPG	Rebounds per game	APG	Assists per game	SPG	Steals per game
BPG	Blocks per game	PPG	Points per game	**Bold**	Career high
†	Won an NBA championship

=== NBA ===
==== Regular season ====
Year	Team	GP	GS	MPG	FG%	3P%	FT%	RPG	APG	SPG	BPG	PPG
2021–22	Philadelphia	2	0	2.8	**1.000**	—	—	1.0	.0	.0	**1.0**	1.0
2022–23	Philadelphia	16	**2**	5.6	.486	**.400**	.750	.9	.5	.4	.2	2.6
2023–24†	Philadelphia	**32**	1	11.8	.390	.216	.824	1.8	1.1	**.8**	.3	**4.0**
2023–24†	Boston	17	1	7.6	.433	.182	**.875**	1.2	.5	.6	.2	2.1
2024–25	Boston	26	0	5.4	.353	.316	.714	.9	.4	.5	.0	1.7
2024–25	Utah	17	**2**	**13.2**	.411	.207	.706	**2.0**	**1.4**	.7	.2	3.8
Career		110	6	8.8	.409	.238	.773	1.4	.8	.6	.2	2.9

==== Playoffs ====
Year	Team	GP	GS	MPG	FG%	3P%	FT%	RPG	APG	SPG	BPG	PPG
2022	Philadelphia	**5**	0	2.6	.500	.000	—	**.8**	**.4**	.0	.0	1.2
2023	Philadelphia	4	0	4.2	**1.000**	—	.500	.0	.0	**.3**	.0	**2.3**
2024†	Boston	4	0	**5.5**	.667	—	—	**.8**	.3	.0	**.3**	1.0
Career		13	0	4.0	.692	.000	.500	.5	.2	.1	.1	1.5

=== College ===
Year	Team	GP	GS	MPG	FG%	3P%	FT%	RPG	APG	SPG	BPG	PPG
2020–21	Tennessee	25	15	25.9	.467	.435	.810	3.5	2.9	1.2	.4	12.5

== Personal life ==
Springer's father, Gary, was a McDonald's All-American basketball player and played college basketball for Iona. Gary was a sixth-round selection in the 1984 NBA draft by the Philadelphia 76ers but did not play professionally due to a lingering knee injury. Both of Springer's older brothers played college basketball: Gary Jr. for Iona and Jordan for Army. His cousin is former NBA player DeAndre' Bembry.
