= 2023–24 Philadelphia 76ers season =

- Head coach: Nick Nurse
- President: Daryl Morey
- General manager: Elton Brand
- Owner: Josh Harris
- Arena: Wells Fargo Center

Results
- Record: 47–35 (.573)
- Place: Division: 3rd (Atlantic); Conference: 7th (Eastern)
- Playoff finish: First round (lost to Knicks 2–4)
- Stats at Basketball Reference

Local media
- Television: NBCSPHI, NBCSPHI+, 6ABC
- Radio: WPEN

The 2023–24 Philadelphia 76ers season was the 75th season for the franchise in the National Basketball Association (NBA). On May 16, 2023, the 76ers fired head coach Doc Rivers after three seasons with the team. On June 1, 2023, the 76ers hired Nick Nurse as their head coach.

Despite starting the season with a 29–13 record and within a half game of the 2nd seed of the Eastern Conference, Joel Embiid tore his lateral meniscus in a game against the Warriors on January 30, after already missing a few games due to an unrelated injury. The 76ers struggled during his absence, going 11–22 in that span and dropping to the 8th seed; Embiid returned on April 2 in a 109–105 win over the Oklahoma City Thunder. Despite winning their final 8 games, the 76ers were unable to climb higher than the 7th seed, but clinched a playoff spot with a win over the Miami Heat in the play-in tournament on April 17. However, they were eliminated in the first round by the New York Knicks, 4–2, marking the first time the 76ers failed to make it into the second round since they got swept by the Celtics in the 2020 NBA playoffs.

The Philadelphia 76ers drew an average home attendance of 20,041 in 41 home games in the 2023-24 NBA season, the 3rd highest in the league.

== Draft ==
The 76ers entered this draft with no draft pick. They initially had a second-round pick, but it was forfeited alongside their 2024 second-round pick due to tampering violations with respect to free agency. Their first-round pick, originally given to the Brooklyn Nets as an option alongside their 2022 pick in the James Harden trade, was conveyed to the Utah Jazz after Brooklyn chose to defer the asset to 2023, fulfilling a condition to deliver the least favorable selection when Philadelphia finished with a better 2022–23 regular season record than Brooklyn and the Houston Rockets.

== Roster ==
2023–24 Philadelphia 76ers roster
Players

Pos.	No.	Player	Height	Weight	DOB	From
C	5	Mo Bamba	7 ft 0 in (2.13 m)	231 lb (105 kg)	1998-05-12	Texas
F	40	Nicolas Batum	6 ft 8 in (2.03 m)	230 lb (104 kg)	1988-12-14	France
G	16	Ricky IV Council	6 ft 6 in (1.98 m)	205 lb (93 kg)	2001-08-03	Arkansas
F	33	Robert Covington (injured)	6 ft 7 in (2.01 m)	209 lb (95 kg)	1990-12-14	Tennessee State
G	11	Jeff Dowtin	6 ft 3 in (1.91 m)	177 lb (80 kg)	1997-05-10	Rhode Island
C	21	Joel Embiid (C)	7 ft 0 in (2.13 m)	280 lb (127 kg)	1994-03-16	Kansas
F	12	Tobias Harris	6 ft 9 in (2.06 m)	226 lb (103 kg)	1992-07-15	Tennessee
G	17	Buddy Hield	6 ft 4 in (1.93 m)	220 lb (100 kg)	1992-12-17	Oklahoma
G	7	Kyle Lowry	6 ft 0 in (1.83 m)	196 lb (89 kg)	1986-03-25	Villanova
F	1	Kenyon Jr. Martin	6 ft 6 in (1.98 m)	215 lb (98 kg)	2001-01-06	IMG Academy (FL)
G	0	Tyrese Maxey	6 ft 2 in (1.88 m)	200 lb (91 kg)	2000-10-04	Kentucky
G	8	De'Anthony Melton (injured)	6 ft 3 in (1.91 m)	200 lb (91 kg)	1998-05-28	USC
G/F	9	Kelly Jr. Oubre	6 ft 7 in (2.01 m)	203 lb (92 kg)	1995-12-09	Kansas
G	22	Cameron Payne	6 ft 3 in (1.91 m)	183 lb (83 kg)	1994-08-08	Murray State
F/C	44	Paul Reed	6 ft 9 in (2.06 m)	210 lb (95 kg)	1999-06-26	DePaul
G	23	Terquavion Smith (TW)	6 ft 4 in (1.93 m)	195 lb (88 kg)	2002-12-31	NC State

Coaches
Head coach
- Nick Nurse
Assistant(s)
- Matt Brase
- John Corbacio
- Fabulous Flournoy
- Bryan Gates
- Rico Hines
- Bobby Jackson
- Coby Karl
- Mike Longabardi
- Jason Love
- Doug West

Legend
- (DP) Unsigned draft pick
- (FA) Free agent
- (S) Suspended
- (GL) On assignment to G League affiliate
- (TW) Two-way affiliate player
- Injured

Roster
Updated: April 13, 2024

== Standings ==
=== Division ===
Atlantic Division	W	L	PCT	GB	Home	Road	Div	GP
z – Boston Celtics	64	18	.780	–	37‍–‍4	27‍–‍14	15‍–‍2	82
x – New York Knicks	50	32	.610	14.0	27‍–‍14	23‍–‍18	12‍–‍5	82
x – Philadelphia 76ers	47	35	.573	17.0	25‍–‍16	22‍–‍19	8‍–‍8	82
Brooklyn Nets	32	50	.390	32.0	20‍–‍21	12‍–‍29	5‍–‍11	82
Toronto Raptors	25	57	.305	39.0	14‍–‍27	11‍–‍30	1‍–‍15	82

=== Conference ===
Eastern Conference
#	Team	W	L	PCT	GB	GP
1	z – Boston Celtics *	64	18	.780	–	82
2	x – New York Knicks	50	32	.610	14.0	82
3	y – Milwaukee Bucks *	49	33	.598	15.0	82
4	x – Cleveland Cavaliers	48	34	.585	16.0	82
5	y – Orlando Magic *	47	35	.573	17.0	82
6	x – Indiana Pacers	47	35	.573	17.0	82
7	x – Philadelphia 76ers	47	35	.573	17.0	82
8	x – Miami Heat	46	36	.561	18.0	82
9	pi – Chicago Bulls	39	43	.476	25.0	82
10	pi – Atlanta Hawks	36	46	.439	28.0	82
11	Brooklyn Nets	32	50	.390	32.0	82
12	Toronto Raptors	25	57	.305	39.0	82
13	Charlotte Hornets	21	61	.256	43.0	82
14	Washington Wizards	15	67	.183	49.0	82
15	Detroit Pistons	14	68	.171	50.0	82

== Game log ==
=== Preseason ===
2023 preseason game log
Total: 2–2 (Home: 1–1; Road: 1–1)
Preseason: 2–2 (home: 1–1; road: 1–1)

Game	Date	Team	Score	High points	High rebounds	High assists	Location Attendance	Record
1	October 8	@ Boston	L 106–114	Tyrese Maxey (24)	Tobias Harris (7)	Tyrese Maxey (4)	TD Garden; 19,156	0–1
2	October 11	Boston	L 101–112	Kelly Oubre Jr. (18)	Paul Reed (7)	Paul Reed (5)	Wells Fargo Center; 20,497	0–2
3	October 16	@ Brooklyn	W 127–119	Kelly Oubre Jr. (21)	Tobias Harris (9)	De'Anthony Melton (10)	Barclays Center; 14,966	1–2
4	October 20	Atlanta	W 120–106	De'Anthony Melton (29)	Paul Reed (8)	Tyrese Maxey (12)	Wells Fargo Center; 20,728	2–2

2023–24 preseason schedule

=== Regular season ===
2023–24 game log
Total: 47–35 (Home: 25–16; Road: 22–19)
October: 2–1 (home: 1–0; road: 1–1)

Game	Date	Team	Score	High points	High rebounds	High assists	Location Attendance	Record
1	October 26	@ Milwaukee	L 117–118	Tyrese Maxey (31)	Embiid, Harris, Tucker (7)	Tyrese Maxey (8)	Fiserv Forum; 17,783	0–1
2	October 28	@ Toronto	W 114–107	Embiid, Maxey (34)	Joel Embiid (9)	Joel Embiid (8)	Scotiabank Arena; 19,800	1–1
3	October 29	Portland	W 126–98	Joel Embiid (35)	Joel Embiid (15)	De'Anthony Melton (8)	Wells Fargo Center; 19,768	2–1

November: 10–5 (home: 6–3; road: 4–2)

Game	Date	Team	Score	High points	High rebounds	High assists	Location Attendance	Record
4	November 2	Toronto	W 114–99	Joel Embiid (28)	Joel Embiid (13)	Joel Embiid (7)	Wells Fargo Center; 19,773	3–1
5	November 4	Phoenix	W 112–100	Joel Embiid (26)	Joel Embiid (11)	Tyrese Maxey (10)	Wells Fargo Center; 19,796	4–1
6	November 6	Washington	W 146–128	Joel Embiid (48)	Joel Embiid (11)	Tyrese Maxey (11)	Wells Fargo Center; 19,765	5–1
7	November 8	Boston	W 106–103	Joel Embiid (27)	Joel Embiid (10)	Tyrese Maxey (5)	Wells Fargo Center; 19,953	6–1
8	November 10	@ Detroit	W 114–106	Joel Embiid (33)	Joel Embiid (16)	Tyrese Maxey (11)	Little Caesars Arena; 18,902	7–1
9	November 12	Indiana	W 137–126	Tyrese Maxey (50)	Joel Embiid (13)	Joel Embiid (7)	Wells Fargo Center; 19,758	8–1
10	November 14	Indiana	L 126–132	Joel Embiid (39)	Joel Embiid (12)	Joel Embiid (6)	Wells Fargo Center; 19,774	8–2
11	November 15	Boston	L 107–117	Embiid, Maxey (20)	Joel Embiid (9)	Joel Embiid (7)	Wells Fargo Center; 19,773	8–3
12	November 17	@ Atlanta	W 126–116	Joel Embiid (32)	Tobias Harris (10)	Embiid, Maxey (8)	State Farm Arena; 17,067	9–3
13	November 19	@ Brooklyn	W 121–99	Joel Embiid (32)	Joel Embiid (12)	Tyrese Maxey (10)	Barclays Center; 17,934	10–3
14	November 21	Cleveland	L 119–122 (OT)	Joel Embiid (32)	Joel Embiid (13)	Tyrese Maxey (6)	Wells Fargo Center; 20,565	10–4
15	November 22	@ Minnesota	L 99–112	Maxey, Melton, Morris Sr. (16)	Paul Reed (9)	Tyrese Maxey (8)	Target Center; 18,024	10–5
16	November 25	@ Oklahoma City	W 127–123	Joel Embiid (35)	Joel Embiid (11)	Joel Embiid (9)	Paycom Center; 17,125	11–5
17	November 27	L.A. Lakers	W 138–94	Tyrese Maxey (31)	Joel Embiid (11)	Joel Embiid (11)	Wells Fargo Center; 19,907	12–5
18	November 29	@ New Orleans	L 114–124	Tyrese Maxey (33)	Robert Covington (7)	Patrick Beverley (7)	Smoothie King Center; 16,009	12–6

December: 10–4 (home: 5–1; road: 5–3)

Game	Date	Team	Score	High points	High rebounds	High assists	Location Attendance	Record
19	December 1	@ Boston	L 119–125	Patrick Beverley (26)	Patrick Beverley (8)	Patrick Beverley (7)	TD Garden; 19,156	12–7
20	December 6	@ Washington	W 131–126	Joel Embiid (50)	Joel Embiid (13)	Embiid, Maxey (7)	Capital One Arena; 15,568	13–7
21	December 8	Atlanta	W 125–114	Joel Embiid (38)	Joel Embiid (14)	Tyrese Maxey (7)	Wells Fargo Center; 19,746	14–7
22	December 11	Washington	W 146–101	Joel Embiid (34)	Joel Embiid (11)	Embiid, Harris, Maxey (6)	Wells Fargo Center; 19,762	15–7
23	December 13	@ Detroit	W 129–111	Joel Embiid (41)	Joel Embiid (11)	Tyrese Maxey (9)	Little Caesars Arena; 16,749	16–7
24	December 15	Detroit	W 124–92	Joel Embiid (35)	Joel Embiid (13)	Batum, Maxey (4)	Wells Fargo Center; 19,761	17–7
25	December 16	@ Charlotte	W 135–82	Joel Embiid (42)	Joel Embiid (15)	Tyrese Maxey (7)	Spectrum Center; 17,829	18–7
26	December 18	Chicago	L 104–108	Joel Embiid (40)	Joel Embiid (14)	Tyrese Maxey (8)	Wells Fargo Center; 19,773	18–8
27	December 20	Minnesota	W 127–113	Joel Embiid (51)	Joel Embiid (12)	Tyrese Maxey (5)	Wells Fargo Center; 20,365	19–8
28	December 22	Toronto	W 121–111	Harris, Maxey (33)	Joel Embiid (10)	Tyrese Maxey (10)	Wells Fargo Center; 20,230	20–8
29	December 25	@ Miami	L 113–119	Tobias Harris (27)	three players (7)	Tobias Harris (6)	Kaseya Center; 20,162	20–9
30	December 27	@ Orlando	W 112–92	Tyrese Maxey (23)	Paul Reed (10)	Paul Reed (3)	Kia Center; 19,179	21–9
31	December 29	@ Houston	W 131–127	Tyrese Maxey (42)	Marcus Morris Sr. (5)	Tobias Harris (7)	Toyota Center; 18,055	22–9
32	December 30	@ Chicago	L 92–105	Tyrese Maxey (20)	Harris, Reed (7)	Tyrese Maxey (7)	United Center; 21,648	22–10

January: 7–7 (home: 5–2; road: 2–5)

Game	Date	Team	Score	High points	High rebounds	High assists	Location Attendance	Record
33	January 2	Chicago	W 110–97	Joel Embiid (31)	Joel Embiid (15)	Joel Embiid (10)	Wells Fargo Center; 19,772	23–10
34	January 5	New York	L 92–128	Joel Embiid (30)	Joel Embiid (10)	Tyrese Maxey (9)	Wells Fargo Center; 20,461	23–11
35	January 6	Utah	L 109–120	Tyrese Maxey (25)	Morris Sr., Reed (6)	Tyrese Maxey (9)	Wells Fargo Center; 20,278	23–12
36	January 10	@ Atlanta	L 132–139 (OT)	Tyrese Maxey (35)	Tobias Harris (10)	Tyrese Maxey (9)	State Farm Arena; 16,089	23–13
37	January 12	Sacramento	W 112–93	Tobias Harris (37)	Patrick Beverley (9)	Patrick Beverley (7)	Wells Fargo Center; 19,766	24–13
38	January 15	Houston	W 124–115	Joel Embiid (41)	Joel Embiid (10)	Tyrese Maxey (7)	Wells Fargo Center; 20,822	25–13
39	January 16	Denver	W 126–121	Joel Embiid (41)	Joel Embiid (7)	Joel Embiid (10)	Wells Fargo Center; 19,775	26–13
40	January 19	@ Orlando	W 124–109	Joel Embiid (36)	Marcus Morris Sr. (9)	Batum, Maxey (5)	Kia Center; 19,063	27–13
41	January 20	@ Charlotte	W 97–89	Joel Embiid (33)	Joel Embiid (10)	Tyrese Maxey (8)	Spectrum Center; 18,261	28–13
42	January 22	San Antonio	W 133–123	Joel Embiid (70)	Joel Embiid (18)	Tyrese Maxey (8)	Wells Fargo Center; 20,511	29–13
43	January 25	@ Indiana	L 122–134	Joel Embiid (31)	Joel Embiid (7)	Beverley, Smith (5)	Gainbridge Fieldhouse; 15,699	29–14
44	January 27	@ Denver	L 105–111	Paul Reed (30)	Paul Reed (13)	Patrick Beverley (11)	Ball Arena; 19,805	29–15
45	January 29	@ Portland	L 104–130	Kelly Oubre Jr. (25)	Oubre Jr., Reed (6)	Patrick Beverley (5)	Moda Center; 17,128	29–16
46	January 30	@ Golden State	L 107–119	Tobias Harris (26)	Tobias Harris (10)	Furkan Korkmaz (3)	Chase Center; 18,064	29–17

February: 4–8 (home: 1–7; road: 3–1)

Game	Date	Team	Score	High points	High rebounds	High assists	Location Attendance	Record
47	February 1	@ Utah	W 127–124	Tyrese Maxey (51)	Paul Reed (10)	Tobias Harris (7)	Delta Center; 18,206	30–17
48	February 3	Brooklyn	L 121–136	Tyrese Maxey (23)	Mo Bamba (6)	Patrick Beverley (9)	Wells Fargo Center; 20,673	30–18
49	February 5	Dallas	L 102–118	Kelly Oubre Jr. (19)	Mo Bamba (10)	Tyrese Maxey (7)	Wells Fargo Center; 19,764	30–19
50	February 7	Golden State	L 104–127	Ricky Council IV (17)	Paul Reed (8)	Patrick Beverley (5)	Wells Fargo Center; 19,780	30–20
51	February 9	Atlanta	L 121–127	Kelly Oubre Jr. (28)	Paul Reed (13)	Tobias Harris (7)	Wells Fargo Center; 19,758	30–21
52	February 10	@ Washington	W 119–113	Tyrese Maxey (28)	Ricky Council IV (10)	Tyrese Maxey (7)	Capital One Arena; 20,333	31–21
53	February 12	@ Cleveland	W 123–121	Hield, Oubre Jr. (24)	Bamba, Reed, Martin (8)	Tyrese Maxey (9)	Rocket Mortgage FieldHouse; 19,432	32–21
54	February 14	Miami	L 104–109	Tyrese Maxey (30)	Paul Reed (12)	Buddy Hield (10)	Wells Fargo Center; 20,015	32–22
All-Star Game
55	February 22	New York	L 96–110	Tyrese Maxey (35)	KJ Martin (7)	Buddy Hield (6)	Wells Fargo Center; 21,094	32–23
56	February 23	Cleveland	W 104–97	Tyrese Maxey (24)	Paul Reed (12)	Tyrese Maxey (5)	Wells Fargo Center; 19,938	33–23
57	February 25	Milwaukee	L 98–119	Tyrese Maxey (24)	Kelly Oubre Jr. (9)	Tyrese Maxey (7)	Wells Fargo Center; 19,831	33–24
58	February 27	@ Boston	L 99–117	Tyrese Maxey (32)	Mo Bamba (6)	Tyrese Maxey (5)	TD Garden; 19,156	33–25

March : 7–10 (home: 3–3; road: 4–7)

Game	Date	Team	Score	High points	High rebounds	High assists	Location Attendance	Record
59	March 1	Charlotte	W 121–114	Tyrese Maxey (33)	Tobias Harris (12)	Kyle Lowry (10)	Wells Fargo Center; 19,788	34–25
60	March 3	@ Dallas	W 120–116	Tobias Harris (28)	Nicolas Batum (11)	Kyle Lowry (7)	American Airlines Center; 20,277	35–25
61	March 5	@ Brooklyn	L 107–112	Kelly Oubre Jr. (30)	Tobias Harris (9)	Kyle Lowry (5)	Barclays Center; 17,086	35–26
62	March 6	Memphis	L 109–115	Kelly Oubre Jr. (25)	Paul Reed (11)	Jeff Dowtin Jr. (6)	Wells Fargo Center; 19,757	35–27
63	March 8	New Orleans	L 95–103	Tobias Harris (21)	Paul Reed (11)	Kyle Lowry (7)	Wells Fargo Center; 19,777	35–28
64	March 10	@ New York	W 79–73	Kelly Oubre Jr. (18)	Tobias Harris (12)	Cameron Payne (5)	Madison Square Garden; 19,812	36–28
65	March 12	@ New York	L 79–106	Kelly Oubre Jr. (19)	Paul Reed (8)	Kyle Lowry (6)	Madison Square Garden; 19,812	36–29
66	March 14	@ Milwaukee	L 105–114	Tyrese Maxey (30)	Paul Reed (7)	Tyrese Maxey (4)	Fiserv Forum; 17,635	36–30
67	March 16	Charlotte	W 109–98	Tyrese Maxey (30)	Bamba, Batum, Reed (8)	Kyle Lowry (7)	Wells Fargo Center; 19,957	37–30
68	March 18	Miami	W 98–91	Tyrese Maxey (30)	Kelly Oubre Jr. (11)	Tyrese Maxey (10)	Wells Fargo Center; 19,782	38–30
69	March 20	@ Phoenix	L 102–115	Kelly Oubre Jr. (18)	KJ Martin (13)	Lowry, Maxey (7)	Footprint Center; 17,071	38–31
70	March 22	@ L.A. Lakers	L 94–101	Tyrese Maxey (27)	Tobias Harris (13)	Tobias Harris (4)	Crypto.com Arena; 18,997	38–32
71	March 24	@ L.A. Clippers	W 121–107	Harris, Maxey (24)	Paul Reed (8)	Maxey, Oubre Jr. (6)	Crypto.com Arena; 19,370	39–32
72	March 25	@ Sacramento	L 96–108	Tyrese Maxey (29)	Harris, Reed (8)	Cameron Payne (6)	Golden 1 Center; 17,832	39–33
73	March 27	L.A. Clippers	L 107–108	Tyrese Maxey (26)	Bamba, Oubre Jr. (11)	Tyrese Maxey (8)	Wells Fargo Center; 21,022	39–34
74	March 29	@ Cleveland	L 114–117	Kyle Lowry (23)	Nicolas Batum (8)	Tyrese Maxey (11)	Rocket Mortgage FieldHouse; 19,432	39–35
75	March 31	@ Toronto	W 135–120	Kelly Oubre Jr. (32)	Tobias Harris (9)	Kyle Lowry (10)	Scotiabank Arena; 19,114	40–35

April: 7–0 (home: 4–0; road: 3–0)

Game	Date	Team	Score	High points	High rebounds	High assists	Location Attendance	Record
76	April 2	Oklahoma City	W 109–105	Kelly Oubre Jr. (25)	Cameron Payne (10)	Joel Embiid (7)	Wells Fargo Center; 20,733	41–35
77	April 4	@ Miami	W 109–105	Tyrese Maxey (37)	Tyrese Maxey (9)	Tyrese Maxey (11)	Kaseya Center; 19,719	42–35
78	April 6	@ Memphis	W 116–96	Joel Embiid (30)	Joel Embiid (12)	Maxey, Oubre Jr., Reed (5)	FedExForum; 17,794	43–35
79	April 7	@ San Antonio	W 133–126 (2OT)	Tyrese Maxey (52)	Paul Reed (10)	Tyrese Maxey (7)	Frost Bank Center; 18,718	44–35
80	April 9	Detroit	W 120–102	Joel Embiid (37)	Tobias Harris (12)	Joel Embiid (8)	Wells Fargo Center; 19,796	45–35
81	April 12	Orlando	W 125–113	Joel Embiid (32)	Joel Embiid (13)	Joel Embiid (7)	Wells Fargo Center; 20,149	46–35
82	April 14	Brooklyn	W 107–86	Tyrese Maxey (26)	Paul Reed (12)	Kyle Lowry (8)	Wells Fargo Center; 20,246	47–35

2023–24 season schedule

=== Play-in ===
2024 play-in game log
Total: 1–0 (Home: 1–0; Road: 0–0)
Play-in: 1–0 (home: 1–0; road: 0–0)

Game	Date	Team	Score	High points	High rebounds	High assists	Location Attendance	Record
1	April 17	Miami	W 105–104	Joel Embiid (23)	Joel Embiid (15)	Hield, Maxey (6)	Wells Fargo Center; 19,788	1–0

2023–24 season schedule

=== Playoffs ===
2024 playoff game log
Total: 2–4 (Home: 1–2; Road: 1–2)
First round: 2–4 (home: 1–2; road: 1–2)

Game	Date	Team	Score	High points	High rebounds	High assists	Location Attendance	Series
1	April 20	@ New York	L 104–111	Tyrese Maxey (33)	Tobias Harris (9)	Joel Embiid (6)	Madison Square Garden; 19,812	0–1
2	April 22	@ New York	L 101–104	Tyrese Maxey (35)	Joel Embiid (10)	Tyrese Maxey (10)	Madison Square Garden; 19,812	0–2
3	April 25	New York	W 125–114	Joel Embiid (50)	Joel Embiid (8)	Tyrese Maxey (7)	Wells Fargo Center; 21,116	1–2
4	April 28	New York	L 92–97	Joel Embiid (27)	Joel Embiid (10)	Kyle Lowry (7)	Wells Fargo Center; 21,048	1–3
5	April 30	@ New York	W 112–106 (OT)	Tyrese Maxey (46)	Joel Embiid (16)	Joel Embiid (10)	Madison Square Garden; 19,812	2–3
6	May 2	New York	L 115–118	Joel Embiid (39)	Joel Embiid (13)	Tyrese Maxey (5)	Wells Fargo Center; 21,093	2–4

2024 playoff schedule

=== In-Season Tournament ===
This was the first regular season where all the NBA teams competed in a mid-season tournament setting due to the implementation of the 2023 NBA In-Season Tournament. During the in-season tournament period, the 76ers competed in Group A of the Eastern Conference, which included the Cleveland Cavaliers, Atlanta Hawks, Indiana Pacers, and Detroit Pistons.

==== East group A ====
Pos	Team	Pld	W	L	PF	PA	PD	Qualification	IND	CLE	PHI	ATL	DET
1	Indiana Pacers	4	4	0	546	507	+39	Advance to knockout stage	—	121–116	132–126	157–152	136–113
2	Cleveland Cavaliers	4	3	1	474	445	+29		116–121	—	122–119 (OT)	128–105	108–100
3	Philadelphia 76ers	4	2	2	485	476	+9		126–132	119–122 (OT)	—	126–116	114–106
4	Atlanta Hawks	4	1	3	499	531	−32		152–157	105–128	116–126	—	126–120
5	Detroit Pistons	4	0	4	439	484	−45		113–136	100–108	106–114	120–126	—

Source: NBA
Rules for classification: Tiebreakers

== Player statistics ==
Legend
GP	Games played	GS	Games started	MPG	Minutes per game
FG%	Field-goal percentage	3P%	3-point field-goal percentage	FT%	Free-throw percentage
RPG	Rebounds per game	APG	Assists per game	SPG	Steals per game
BPG	Blocks per game	PPG	Points per game

=== Regular season ===
Philadelphia 76ers statistics
Player	GP	GS	MPG	FG%	3P%	FT%	RPG	APG	SPG	BPG	PPG
Mo Bamba	57	17	13.0	.490	.391	.680	4.2	.7	.4	1.1	4.4
Nicolas Batum^{†}	57	38	25.9	.456	.399	.714	4.2	2.2	.8	.6	5.5
Darius Bazley^{†}	3	0	3.3	.000			.3	.7	.0	.0	.0
Patrick Beverley^{†}	47	5	19.6	.432	.321	.810	3.1	3.1	.5	.4	6.3
Ricky Council IV	32	0	9.0	.482	.375	.746	1.4	.5	.3	.0	5.4
Robert Covington^{†}	26	3	16.1	.449	.354	.875	3.4	.7	1.3	.6	4.5
Jeff Dowtin	12	0	11.8	.556	.474	.750	1.7	2.3	.6	.1	4.3
Joel Embiid	39	39	33.6	.529	.388	.883	11.0	5.6	1.2	1.7	34.7
Danny Green	2	0	9.0	.000	.000		1.0	.5	.5	.0	.0
Tobias Harris	70	70	33.8	.487	.353	.878	6.5	3.1	1.0	.7	17.2
Buddy Hield^{†}	32	14	25.8	.426	.389	.923	3.2	3.0	.8	.3	12.2
Danuel House Jr.	34	4	15.0	.448	.300	.761	1.7	.8	.4	.1	4.2
Furkan Korkmaz	35	0	8.6	.395	.350	.700	.9	.7	.4	.1	2.5
Kenneth Lofton Jr.^{†}	2	0	4.5	.167	.000		1.5	.0	.0	.0	1.0
Kyle Lowry^{†}	23	20	28.4	.444	.404	.848	2.8	4.6	.9	.3	8.0
Kenyon Martin Jr.^{†}	58	2	12.3	.544	.304	.538	2.2	.9	.3	.2	3.7
Tyrese Maxey	70	70	37.5	.450	.373	.868	3.7	6.2	1.0	.5	25.9
De'Anthony Melton	38	33	26.9	.386	.360	.835	3.7	3.0	1.6	.4	11.1
Marcus Morris Sr.^{†}	37	7	17.2	.439	.400	.861	2.9	.7	.4	.3	6.7
Kelly Oubre Jr.	68	52	30.2	.441	.311	.750	5.0	1.5	1.1	.7	15.4
Cameron Payne^{†}	31	8	19.4	.413	.382	.913	1.8	3.1	.6	.3	9.3
Filip Petrušev^{†}	1	0	3.0				1.0	.0	.0	.0	.0
Paul Reed	82	24	19.4	.540	.368	.718	6.0	1.3	.8	1.0	7.3
Javonte Smart	1	0	1.0				.0	.0	.0	.0	.0
Terquavion Smith	16	0	5.3	.391	.371	.600	.3	.8	.5	.0	3.3
Jaden Springer^{†}	32	1	11.8	.390	.216	.824	1.8	1.1	.8	.3	4.0
P. J. Tucker^{†}	3	3	22.0	.400	.400		4.7	.0	1.0	.7	2.0
D. J. Wilson	2	0	7.5	.667	1.000		1.0	1.0	.0	1.0	5.0

=== Playoffs ===
Philadelphia 76ers statistics
Player	GP	GS	MPG	FG%	3P%	FT%	RPG	APG	SPG	BPG	PPG
Nicolas Batum	6	0	28.3	.414	.409	.625	5.8	1.3	.2	.8	6.3
Joel Embiid	6	6	41.3	.444	.333	.859	10.8	5.7	1.2	1.5	33.0
Tobias Harris	6	6	36.3	.431	.333	1.000	7.2	1.5	.2	.5	9.0
Buddy Hield	4	0	12.8	.412	.462	1.000	1.3	.5	.0	.3	5.5
Kyle Lowry	6	6	29.2	.344	.333	.800	3.5	4.0	1.0	.7	7.0
Tyrese Maxey	6	6	44.5	.478	.400	.893	5.2	6.8	.8	.3	29.8
De'Anthony Melton	1	0	7.0	.000	.000		1.0	1.0	.0	.0	.0
Kelly Oubre Jr.	6	6	37.3	.484	.391	.727	4.0	1.7	1.8	1.2	13.2
Cameron Payne	5	0	12.2	.400	.444		1.2	1.4	.2	.8	5.6
Paul Reed	6	0	7.2	.444		.500	2.7	.3	.2	.5	1.5

- ^{†} Denotes player spent time with another team in the season. Stats reflect time with the 76ers only.

== Transactions ==
=== Trades ===
November 1, 2023
To Philadelphia 76ers

Nicolas Batum (from L.A. Clippers)
Robert Covington (from L.A. Clippers)
Marcus Morris (from L.A. Clippers)
Kenyon Martin Jr. (from L.A. Clippers)
2024 second-round pick (from L.A. Clippers)
2026 first-round pick (from Oklahoma City)
2028 LAC first-round pick (from L.A. Clippers)
2029 protected right to swap first-round picks (from L.A. Clippers)
2029 LAC second-round pick (from L.A. Clippers)
Cash considerations (from L.A. Clippers)

To Los Angeles Clippers

James Harden (from Philadelphia)
P.J. Tucker (from Philadelphia)
Filip Petrušev (from Philadelphia)

To Oklahoma City Thunder

2027 first-round pick swap (from L.A. Clippers)
Cash considerations (from L.A. Clippers)
February 8, 2024
To Philadelphia 76ers

Buddy Hield (from Indiana)
To Indiana Pacers

Furkan Korkmaz (from Philadelphia)
Doug McDermott (from San Antonio)
2024 TOR second-round pick (from Philadelphia)
2029 POR second-round pick (from Philadelphia)
To San Antonio Spurs

Marcus Morris (from Philadelphia)
2029 LAC second-round pick (from Philadelphia)
Cash considerations (from Philadelphia)
February 8, 2024
To Philadelphia 76ers

2028 second-round pick
To Detroit Pistons

Danuel House Jr.
2024 second-round pick
Cash considerations
February 8, 2024
To Philadelphia 76ers

Cameron Payne
2027 second-round pick
To Milwaukee Bucks

Patrick Beverley
February 8, 2024
To Philadelphia 76ers

2024 second-round pick
To Boston Celtics

Jaden Springer

=== Free agency ===
==== Re-signed ====
Date	Player	Ref.
July 7	Montrezl Harrell	
July 9	Paul Reed	

==== Additions ====
Date	Player	Former team	Ref.
June 22	Ąžuolas Tubelis	Arizona	
June 23	Ricky Council IV	Arkansas	
June 23	Terquavion Smith	NC State	
July 1	Patrick Beverley	Chicago Bulls	
July 5	Mo Bamba	Los Angeles Lakers	
July 17	Filip Petrušev	Crvena Zvezda	
October 21	Javonte Smart	Birmingham Squadron	
December 23	Kenneth Lofton Jr.	Memphis Grizzlies	
February 13	Kyle Lowry	Miami Heat	

==== Subtractions ====
Date	Player	Reason left	New team	Ref.
June 30	Georges Niang	Free agency	Cleveland Cavaliers	
July 9	Shake Milton	Free agency	Minnesota Timberwolves	
November 1	Danny Green	Waived		
December 23	Javonte Smart	Waived	Crvena Zvezda	
