= Rocky River High School (North Carolina) =

American public school in North Carolina

Location
- 10505 Clear Creek Commerce Dr. Mint Hill, North Carolina 28227; United States; 35°12′50″N 80°38′24″W

Information
- Type: Public
- Motto: Learners Today, Leaders Tomorrow
- Established: 2010 (16 years ago)
- School district: Mecklenburg
- CEEB code: 342640
- Principal: David Legrand
- Teaching staff: 89.51 (FTE)
- Grades: 9–12
- Gender: Co-education
- Enrollment: 1,562 (2024-2025)
- Student to teacher ratio: 17.45
- Campus type: Suburban
- Colors: Black and orange
- Athletics: NCHSAA 7A
- Athletics conference: Southwestern 7A/8A
- Mascot: Raven
- Nickname: The Rock
- Rival: Independence High School and Butler High School
- Affiliation: Charlotte-Mecklenburg Schools
- Website: rockyriverhs.cmsk12.org

Rocky River High School is a high school in Mint Hill, a suburb of Charlotte, North Carolina, United States. The school opened its doors to students in 2010.

== Notable alumni ==
- Jaire Alexander, NFL cornerback, 2x Pro Bowl selection
- DeAndre' Bembry, NBA player
- Jaden Springer, NBA player, 2024 NBA champion with the Boston Celtics
