= 2026 NBA playoffs =

Professional basketball tournament

Tournament details
- Dates: April 18 – June 13, 2026
- Season: 2025–26
- Teams: 16

Final positions
- Champions: New York Knicks (3rd title)
- Runners-up: San Antonio Spurs
- Semifinalists: Oklahoma City Thunder; Cleveland Cavaliers

Tournament statistics
- Scoring leader(s): Jalen Brunson (Knicks) (28.4 PPG)

Awards
- MVP: Jalen Brunson (Knicks)

The 2026 NBA playoffs was the postseason tournament of the National Basketball Association's 2025–26 season. The playoffs began on April 18 and ended on June 13 with the New York Knicks defeating the San Antonio Spurs in five games at the 2026 NBA Finals. The Knicks won their first title since 1973, and became the first team to win an NBA Cup championship and an NBA championship in the same season.

The Oklahoma City Thunder were the defending champions, but lost in the Western Conference finals to the Spurs in seven games. The Thunder's loss ensured a unique champion for the eighth consecutive year, the longest stretch in NBA history.

== Overview ==
=== Updates to postseason appearances ===
- The Oklahoma City Thunder made the playoffs for the third consecutive season as the Western Conference's number one seed. They also won the Maurice Podoloff Trophy for clinching the best record in the NBA for the second straight year, becoming the first team to do so.
- The Boston Celtics made the playoffs for the twelfth consecutive season, the longest such streak in the NBA.
- The Denver Nuggets made the playoffs for the eighth consecutive season.
- The Minnesota Timberwolves made the playoffs for the fifth consecutive season.
- The New York Knicks, Los Angeles Lakers, and Cleveland Cavaliers made the playoffs for the fourth consecutive season.
- The Orlando Magic made the playoffs for the third consecutive season.
- The Detroit Pistons and Houston Rockets made the playoffs for the second consecutive season.
- The Philadelphia 76ers and Phoenix Suns returned to the playoffs after missing the postseason the previous year.
- The Atlanta Hawks made the playoffs for the first time since 2023.
- The Toronto Raptors made the playoffs for the first time since 2022.
- The Portland Trail Blazers made the playoffs for the first time since 2021.
- The San Antonio Spurs made the playoffs for the first time since 2019.
- The Memphis Grizzlies and Golden State Warriors missed the playoffs after making the postseason the previous year.
- The Indiana Pacers missed the playoffs for the first time since 2023. They were the defending Eastern Conference champions from 2025.
- The Los Angeles Clippers missed the playoffs for the first time since 2022.
- The Miami Heat missed the playoffs for the first time since 2019.
- The Milwaukee Bucks missed the playoffs for the first time since 2016.
- The New Orleans Pelicans and Dallas Mavericks missed the playoffs for the second consecutive season.
- The Brooklyn Nets and Sacramento Kings missed the playoffs for the third consecutive season.
- The Utah Jazz and Chicago Bulls missed the playoffs for the fourth consecutive season.
- The Washington Wizards missed the playoffs for the fifth consecutive season.
- The Charlotte Hornets missed the playoffs for the tenth consecutive season, currently the longest active playoff drought in the NBA.

==== Play-in tournament ====
- The Miami Heat took part in the play-in tournament for the fourth consecutive season.
- The Golden State Warriors took part in the play-in tournament for the third consecutive season.
- The Orlando Magic took part in the play-in tournament for the second consecutive season.
- The Philadelphia 76ers took part in the play-in tournament for the first time since 2024.
- The Los Angeles Clippers and Charlotte Hornets took part in the play-in tournament for the first time since 2022.
- The Portland Trail Blazers took part in the play-in tournament for the first time since 2020.
- The Phoenix Suns took part in the play-in tournament for the first time in franchise history.

=== Notable occurrences ===
==== First round ====
- With a Game 2 win against the Orlando Magic, the Detroit Pistons ended their 11-game postseason losing streak at home, the longest in NBA history, which began in 2008.
- With a Game 2 win against the Toronto Raptors, the Cleveland Cavaliers tied the record for the most consecutive playoff wins against a single opponent, with 12. The record is also held by the Cavaliers against both the Atlanta Hawks and the Detroit Pistons, as well as the Los Angeles Lakers against the Seattle SuperSonics. The streak ended in Game 3.
- In Game 3, LeBron James lobbed an alley-oop to his son Bronny James for a reverse layup, which was the first father–son assist in NBA playoff history.
- The Rockets were the second team since the play-by-play era (29 years) to blow a 6-plus point lead in the final 30 seconds of regulation in the playoffs, joining the 2024 New York Knicks.
- In their Game 4 win against Portland, San Antonio Spurs became the first team to win a playoff game by 15 or more points after trailing by 15 or more points.
- With the Thunder sweeping the Suns in the first round, this was the 50th straight playoffs with a series sweep. The last playoffs without a sweep was in 1976.
- Cade Cunningham and Paolo Banchero became the second set of players on opposing teams to score 45-plus points in the same game in the playoffs, joining Donovan Mitchell and Jamal Murray in 2020.
- Prior to their Game 5 loss to the Rockets, the Lakers held an all-time franchise record of 40–1 when leading a playoff series 3–1. Their only previous loss in that situation came back in 2006 against the Phoenix Suns.
- The New York Knicks set an NBA playoff record with a 47-point halftime lead over the Atlanta Hawks in Game 6. The previous record of 41 points was held by the 2017 Cleveland Cavaliers and the 2025 Indiana Pacers. With their win against the Hawks, they became the first NBA Cup champion to reach the Conference Semifinals in the playoffs.
- With the Celtics–76ers series going the full seven games, this was the 27th straight playoffs to have a series go to a Game 7. 1999 was the last time no series went to a Game 7.
- The Minnesota Timberwolves became the first team to advance to the conference semifinals as the 6th seed in consecutive seasons.
  - As such, this also marks the fourth straight playoffs where a 6th seed advances to the second round.
- In Game 6 against Atlanta, Karl-Anthony Towns made 1 field goal while achieving a triple-double, tying the NBA record and setting the postseason record.
- The Pistons set a record for the largest playoff comeback by a team facing elimination on the road, trailing 24 points against the Magic in Game 6. The Magic only scored 19 points in the second half of that game, which is the fewest points scored in a half in playoff history.
- The first round featured three game sevens, the most since 2014, with five.
- The Philadelphia 76ers became the 14th team in NBA history to overcome a 3–1 series deficit. (Note: The 2020 Denver Nuggets overcame a 3–1 deficit twice in the same playoffs. The 76ers were the 13th different team overall to come back from a 3–1 series deficit.) They were also the first team since the 2016 Cleveland Cavaliers in the NBA Finals to do so while winning Game 7 on the road. (Note: In 2020, the Denver Nuggets overcame a 3–1 deficit against the Los Angeles Clippers in the second round and clinched the series win as the road team, but this series was played at a neutral site due to the COVID-19 pandemic.)
- The seventh-seeded 76ers defeated the second-seeded Celtics in seven games, marking the eighth instance in NBA history of a 7th-seeded team defeating a 2nd-seeded team in the first round, following previous instances in 1987, 1989, 1991, 1998, 2010, 2023, and 2025. Additionally, this was only the fourth time and the third time in four seasons that such an upset occurred in a best-of-seven series, as well as the second time it occurred in a full seven game series.
- The Detroit Pistons became the 15th team in NBA history to overcome a 3–1 series deficit. (Note: The 2020 Denver Nuggets overcame a 3–1 deficit twice in the same playoffs. The Pistons were the 14th different team overall to come back from a 3–1 series deficit.) They were also the first team to do so against the same team (Orlando Magic) twice, having done so in 2003, and the first 1-seeded team since the 2016 Golden State Warriors in the Western Conference Finals to overcome a 3–1 deficit and win Game 7 at home.
  - With this feat, this was the second time two teams overcame a 3–1 series deficit in the same postseason, after 2016. This was also the first time this happened in a single round.
- In the Cavaliers–Raptors series, the home team won all seven games in the series; this was the first time this happened since the Cavaliers–Magic first-round series in 2024, and the 17th time this has been recorded in a 2–2–1–1–1 format.

==== Conference semifinals ====
- In Game 1, Victor Wembanyama set the playoff record for blocks in a game with 12. The previous record of 10 was held by Mark Eaton, Hakeem Olajuwon, and Andrew Bynum.
- The New York Knicks became the first team to win three consecutive playoff games by 25 points with a 137–98 win in Game 1 against the Philadelphia 76ers.
- In Game 1, the Pistons ended their 12-game postseason losing streak to the Cavaliers, which dated back to the 2007 Eastern Conference Finals.
- Game 2 of the Knicks–76ers series had 25 lead changes, the most in a playoff game since Game 7 of the Los Angeles Clippers–San Antonio Spurs in the first round in 2015 (31).
- In Game 4, the Knicks tied the NBA playoff record for most 3-pointers made in a playoff game with 25.
  - The Knicks won their seventh consecutive playoff game for the first time in franchise history, surpassing a six-game streak in 1999.
- The Knicks outscored the 76ers by 89 points across a four game sweep, making it the third most lopsided non-first-round series in NBA history.
- Donovan Mitchell tied Sleepy Floyd for most points in a second half of a playoff game with 39 points in Game 4 against the Pistons.
- With a sweep of the Los Angeles Lakers, the Thunder were the 11th team to start the NBA playoffs 8–0. This marked the fourth time LeBron James was swept in a postseason series.
- A moment of silence was held before Game 5 of the Spurs–Timberwolves series on May 12 in memory of Memphis Grizzlies player Brandon Clarke and former player Jason Collins. Clarke died of a drug overdose on May 11, and Collins died of glioblastoma on May 12. Similar tributes were also done before Game 5 of the Cavaliers–Pistons series on May 13.
- With the Cavaliers–Pistons going seven games, this marked the first time since 2016 that two teams who played a game 7 in the first round will play such game in the Semifinals against each other. The last two teams that accomplished this feat was the Heat–Raptors, in which the Raptors prevailed.
- The Pistons lost their first Game 7 at home, as they had been 5–0 previously. Prior, they accumulated their undefeated record across three different home venues (The Pontiac Silverdome, Palace of Auburn Hills, and Little Caesars Arena).
- The Cavaliers overcame a 2–0 series deficit for the fourth time in franchise history, after:
  - 2007 Eastern Conference Finals, against the Detroit Pistons
  - 2016 NBA Finals, against the Golden State Warriors (also a 3–1 comeback)
  - 2018 Eastern Conference Finals, against the Boston Celtics

==== Conference finals ====
- This was the sixth straight season where all four teams competing in the conference finals were different seed numbers (1, 2, 3, 4).
- The Knicks became the first NBA Cup champion to advance to the conference finals.
- The Thunder became the first defending champion since the 2019 Golden State Warriors to advance to the conference finals.
- For the first time in NBA playoffs history, both NBA Cup finalists reached the conference finals in the same postseason.
- The Spurs–Thunder series was the first playoff match-up to feature 62 or more win teams since the 1998 NBA Finals.
- Game 1 of the Spurs and Thunder series went to double overtime, which was the first such game in the NBA playoffs since 2021. Additionally, a Western Conference Finals game had not gone to double overtime in 50 years, since Game 4 of the Suns and Warriors from 1976.
- For the first time in NBA playoff history, Game 1 of both Conference Finals series went to overtime.
- The Cavaliers blew a 22-point lead with 7:52 left in Game 1. This was the second largest blown fourth quarter lead in NBA playoff history (behind the Grizzlies' 24-point blown lead against the Clippers in 2012) and the biggest comeback win in New York Knicks' playoff history.
- The Thunder's 76 bench points against the Spurs in Game 3 was the fifth most in an NBA playoff game by a collective bench and the most in the Thunder's franchise history.
- With a Game 3 win over the Cavaliers, the Knicks were the tenth team to win ten straight games in a single playoff. The last team to achieve this feat was the 2024 Boston Celtics.
- The Knicks completed the sweep against the Cavaliers, thus winning 11 straight games in the process. They were just the fourth team to win 11 consecutive postseason games, joining the:
  - 2017 Golden State Warriors (won 15 straight)
  - 2001 Los Angeles Lakers (won 11 straight)
  - 1999 San Antonio Spurs (won 12 straight)
  - 1989 Los Angeles Lakers (won 11 straight and the only team not to win the Finals)
- For the first time since 2018, the Western Conference Finals went to a seventh game.
  - This is the fifth Game 7 of the 2026 playoffs, tying the record for most in a single postseason (1994, 2014, 2016).
  - In addition, it was the first Game 7 to feature teams with 62 regular season wins or more since the 1981 Eastern Conference Finals between the 76ers and Celtics, and the first with the two teams with the best record since the 2002 Western Conference Finals between the Kings and Lakers.
- With the Thunder's series loss, it guaranteed a new champion for the eighth straight season, extending an NBA record.
- The Spurs were the fifth team to overcome a 3–2 series deficit versus a reigning champion.

==== NBA Finals ====
- The Knicks advanced to the NBA Finals for the first time since 1999. They were also the first team to win the NBA Cup and make an NBA Finals in the same season.
- The Knicks' plus-271 point differential across 14 playoff games is the highest scoring margin by any team entering the Finals in NBA history.
- For the first time since the inception of the NBA Cup, both teams playing in the NBA Cup championship would face again in the NBA Finals.
- The Spurs were the second-youngest team to ever reach the NBA Finals (25.15 years old), trailing only the 1976–77 Trail Blazers (25.02) and surpassing the Thunder's mark (25.71) they set last Finals.
- Victor Wembanyama joined LeBron James and Max Zaslofsky as the only players to make an All-NBA First Team and NBA Finals by age 22.
- For the eighth time in NBA Finals history, one team has won its Conference Finals 4–0, while the other has won 4–3. This happened with the Eastern Conference team doing the sweep twice (1996 and 2026), while the Western Conference team did it six times (1982, 1987, 1998, 2001, 2013, 2023).
- By winning Game 1, the Knicks were just the third team in NBA history to have a 12-game winning streak in a single-postseason, joining the 1999 Spurs and 2017 Warriors.
  - Jalen Brunson's 31 shots were the most shots in a Finals debut since Allen Iverson 41-shot performance in Game 1 of the 2001 Finals.
- The Knicks 105–104 Game 2 win was their 13th straight playoff game, now the second-longest streak by any team in NBA playoff history. Their eight straight road wins in the playoffs tied the 2001 Los Angeles Lakers for most in NBA history.
  - The Knicks became the third team in the history of the NBA Finals to win the first two games on the road, after the 1993 Chicago Bulls and the 1995 Houston Rockets.
- The Knicks' 13-game playoff win streak ended with a 115–111 Spurs win in Game 3. It was the Knicks' first loss since Game 3 of their series with the Hawks in the first round on April 23, a span of 46 days.
- For the second time in NBA Finals history, the road team won each of the first three games. The last time this happened was in 1993.
- The Knicks 107–106 win against the Spurs in Game 4 marked the largest comeback in a game in NBA Finals history (29 points), surpassing the 24 points comeback by the Boston Celtics against the Los Angeles Lakers in Game 4 of the 2008 NBA Finals.
  - San Antonio's 19-point first quarter lead in Game 4 was the largest first quarter lead by a road team in NBA Finals history.
  - OG Anunoby's putback tip-in was the third-latest game-winner in Finals history in the play-by-play era (since 1997), behind Michael Jordan's game-winner in 1997 and Tyrese Haliburton's in 2025.
  - The Knicks led for just 53.8 seconds, the second-least amount of time leading in a Finals win since the 1976–77 merger, behind the 0.3 seconds the Indiana Pacers led in Game 1 of the 2025 Finals against the Oklahoma City Thunder.

==== Post Finals ====
- The Knicks ended their 53-year title drought, while also becoming the eighth consecutive unique champion and the first team to win an NBA Finals and NBA Cup in the same season.
  - The Knicks now hold the record for the longest period between two titles at 53 years with their last win in 1973. This beats the Milwaukee Bucks record of 50 years back in 2021 when they won their previous title back in 1971.
- The 2026 Spurs became the first franchise since the 1993 Phoenix Suns to lose all of their home games despite homecourt advantage, dropping Games 1, 2, and 5 at the Frost Bank Center.
- The Knicks were the first team to win an NBA championship while trailing by double-digits in each four of their wins. They trailed by as much as 14 in Game 1, 12 in Game 2, 29 in Game 4, and 16 in Game 5.
- Karl-Anthony Towns established the NBA single-postseason record for total plus–minus with a +258, surpassing Steph Curry (+245, 2017).
- The New York Knicks averaged an NBA playoff record +14.9 margin of victory, surpassing the 1970–71 Milwaukee Bucks (14.5).
- The New York Knicks accumulated a +283 point differential, surpassing the previous NBA playoff recorded by the 2016–17 Golden State Warriors (+230).
- The New York Knicks tied a record with 12 double digit wins.
- OG Anunoby established an NBA single-postseason record 67.2% effective field goal percentage (min 150 attempts).
- Since play-by-play data began in the 1996–97 NBA season, the Knicks 6–2 record in games in which they trailed by at least 10 points is an NBA record.
- As of 2026, Brunson established an NBA record with a career playoff scoring average 6.8 points above his career regular season scoring average (min 50 playoff games).
- Brunson became the eighth player to win the NBA Finals MVP after winning an NCAA Division I men's basketball tournament and fourth of those to have also won state high school championship, joining Kareem Abdul-Jabbar, Bill Walton, and Magic Johnson.
- Jalen and Rick Brunson became the first father-son duo to win an NBA championship together on the same team with one as a player and the other on the coaching staff.

== Format ==
Eight teams from each conference participated in the playoffs. The top six teams in each conference, based on winning percentage, directly qualified for the playoffs; the seeding order of those teams was also based on winning percentage. If two or more teams had the same record, standard NBA tiebreaker rules were used.

The NBA Board of Governors adopted a format starting in 2021 (later permanently in 2023) to have a play-in tournament involving the teams ranked 7th through 10th in each conference. The 7th place team and 8th place team participated in a "double-chance" game, with the winner advancing to the playoffs as the 7-seed. The loser then played the winner of the elimination game between the 9th place and 10th place teams to determine the playoff's 8-seed. The NBA's regular playoff format then proceeded as normal. Furthermore, the winner of the match between the loser of the 7/8 game and the winner of the 9/10 game always plays on day 2 of the NBA playoffs to allow that team at least a day of rest.

Each conference's bracket was fixed with no reseeding. All rounds were a best-of-seven series; a series ended when one team won four games, and that team advanced to the next round. All rounds, including the NBA Finals, were in a 2–2–1–1–1 format with regards to hosting. In the conference playoffs, home-court advantage went to the higher-seeded team (number one being the highest). For the NBA Finals, home-court advantage went to the team with the better regular season record, and, if needed, ties were broken based on head-to-head record, followed by intra-conference record.

== Playoff qualifying ==
On March 17, 2026, the Oklahoma City Thunder became the first team to clinch a playoff spot. While noted in the below tables, division titles have no bearing on seeding.

=== Eastern Conference ===
Seed	Team	Record	Clinched				
Seed	Team	Record	Play-in berth	Playoff berth	Division title	Best record in conference	Best record in NBA
1	Detroit Pistons	60–22	—	March 20	March 31	April 4	—
2	Boston Celtics	56–26	—	March 29	April 10	—	—
3	New York Knicks	53–29	—	March 30	—	—	—
4	Cleveland Cavaliers	52–30	—	April 2	—	—	—
5	Toronto Raptors	46–36	—	April 12	—	—	—
6	Atlanta Hawks	46–36	—	April 10	April 10	—	—
7	Philadelphia 76ers	45–37	April 12	April 15	—	—	—
8	Orlando Magic	45–37	April 12	April 17	—	—	—

Charlotte (44–38) and Miami (43–39) also secured play-in berths but did not advance to the playoffs.

=== Western Conference ===
Seed	Team	Record	Clinched				
Seed	Team	Record	Play-in berth	Playoff berth	Division title	Best record in conference	Best record in NBA
1	Oklahoma City Thunder	64–18	—	March 17	March 18	April 8	April 8
2	San Antonio Spurs	62–20	—	March 19	March 23	—	—
3	Denver Nuggets	54–28	—	March 31	—	—	—
4	Los Angeles Lakers	53–29	—	March 31	March 31	—	—
5	Houston Rockets	52–30	—	April 2	—	—	—
6	Minnesota Timberwolves	49–33	—	April 7	—	—	—
7	Portland Trail Blazers	42–40	March 29	April 14	—	—	—
8	Phoenix Suns	45–37	April 7	April 17	—	—	—

The L.A. Clippers (42–40) and Golden State (37–45) also secured play-in berths but did not advance to the playoffs.

=== Play-in tournament brackets ===
==== Eastern Conference ====
Play-in games
7	Philadelphia	109
8	Orlando	97
9	Charlotte	127 (OT)
10	Miami	126

No. 8 seed game
8	Orlando	121
9	Charlotte	90

Final seeds
7	Philadelphia	No. 7 seed
8	Orlando	No. 8 seed

Bold Game winner
Italic Team with home-court advantage

==== Western Conference ====
Play-in games
7	Phoenix	110
8	Portland	114
9	LA Clippers	121
10	Golden State	126

No. 8 seed game
7	Phoenix	111
10	Golden State	96

Final seeds
8	Portland	No. 7 seed
7	Phoenix	No. 8 seed

Bold Game winner
Italic Team with home-court advantage

== Bracket ==
Teams in bold advanced to the next round. The numbers to the left of each team indicate the team's seeding in its conference, and the numbers to the right indicate the number of games the team won in that round. The division champions are marked by an asterisk. Teams with home court advantage, the higher seeded team, are shown in italics.

First round	Conference semifinals
**E1**	**Detroit***	**4**
E8	Orlando	3
E1	Detroit*	3
**E4**	**Cleveland**	**4**
**E4**	**Cleveland**	**4**
E5	Toronto	3
**Eastern Conference**
**E3**	**New York**	**4**
E6	Atlanta*	2
**E3**	**New York**	**4**
E7	Philadelphia	0
E2	Boston*	3
**E7**	**Philadelphia**	**4**
**W1**	**Oklahoma City***	**4**
W8	Phoenix	0
**W1**	**Oklahoma City***	**4**
W4	LA Lakers*	0
**W4**	**LA Lakers***	**4**
W5	Houston	2
**Western Conference**
W3	Denver	2
**W6**	**Minnesota**	**4**
W6	Minnesota	2
**W2**	**San Antonio***	**4**
**W2**	**San Antonio***	**4**
W7	Portland	1

Conference finals
E4	Cleveland	0
**E3**	**New York**	**4**
W1	Oklahoma City*	3
**W2**	**San Antonio***	**4**

NBA Finals
E3	**New York**	**4**
W2	San Antonio*	1

- * Division winner
- **Bold** Series winner
- Italic Team with home-court advantage

== First round ==
Note: Times are EDT (UTC−4) as listed by NBA. If the venue is located in a different time zone, the local time is also given.

=== Eastern Conference first round ===
==== (1) Detroit Pistons vs. (8) Orlando Magic ====
NBC/Peacock

April 19
6:30 p.m.

Recap

Orlando Magic 112, Detroit Pistons 101
Scoring by quarter: 35–27, 20–24, 26–23, 31–27
Pts: Paolo Banchero 23; Rebs: Paolo Banchero 9 Asts: Bane, Carter Jr. 5 each	Pts: Cade Cunningham 39; Rebs: Duren, Thompson 7 each Asts: Cunningham, Robinson 4 each
Orlando leads series, 1–0

Little Caesars Arena, Detroit, MI
Attendance: 20,062
Referees: James Williams, Kevin Scott, Brian Forte

Coming off their play-in victory against the Charlotte Hornets, the Magic won in a Game 1 upset at Little Caesars Arena, building up an early 13-point lead and never trailing throughout the game. All 5 starters for Orlando scored in double figures, with the Magic holding off every comeback attempt. For Detroit, Cade Cunningham finished with 39 points, but the All-Star point guard was held to four assists and three turnovers; Tobias Harris added 17 points. No other Pistons player reached double figures as Detroit's postseason losing streak at home extended to 11 games.

ESPN

April 22
7:00 p.m.

Recap

Orlando Magic 83, Detroit Pistons 98
Scoring by quarter: 21–25, 25–21, 16–38, 21–14
Pts: Jalen Suggs 19; Rebs: Franz Wagner 7 Asts: Paolo Banchero 8	Pts: Cade Cunningham 27; Rebs: Tobias Harris 11; Asts: Cade Cunningham 11
Series tied, 1–1

Little Caesars Arena, Detroit, MI
Attendance: 20,062
Referees: James Capers, Tyler Ford, Ed Malloy

After a tightly contested first half that ended in a 46–46 tie, Detroit went on a 30–3 run to start the third quarter to pull ahead and even the series at 1–1. Cade Cunningham once again led the scoring for the Pistons, finishing with 27 points and 11 assists; Tobias Harris also recorded a double-double with 16 points and 11 rebounds. None of Orlando's players scored more than 20: Jalen Suggs had 19 points and 6 rebounds, while Paolo Banchero logged 18 points, 6 rebounds and 8 assists. Both teams struggled on the offensive end this game, going a combined 65 of 165 on field goals, 14 of 58 on 3-pointers, and 37 of 56 on free throws. However, the Pistons held a significant advantage in paint points, outscoring the Magic 54–34, contributing to their victory. The win ended their home playoff losing streak at 11, which was the longest in NBA history.

Peacock/NBCSN

April 25
1:00 p.m.

Recap

Detroit Pistons 105, Orlando Magic 113
Scoring by quarter: 26–26, 28–35, 25–26, 26–26
Pts: Cade Cunningham 27; Rebs: Jalen Duren 9 Asts: Cade Cunningham 9	Pts: Banchero, Bane 25 each Rebs: Wendell Carter Jr. 17; Asts: Paolo Banchero 9
Orlando leads series, 2–1

Kia Center, Orlando, FL
Attendance: 18,846
Referees: Tony Brothers, Mitchell Ervin, Nick Buchert

The Magic wrestled back control of the series to defeat the Pistons, 113–105, at the Kia Center in a matinee tip. Paolo Banchero and Desmond Bane each scored 25 points; Banchero also added 12 rebounds and 9 assists. Orlando's three other starters (Franz Wagner, Jalen Suggs and Wendell Carter Jr.) all scored in double figures, with Carter Jr. having a playoff career-best 17 rebounds. Cade Cunningham scored 27 for Detroit. The Pistons trailed 96–79 with 8:34 left, then outscored the Magic 26–8 over the next six minutes to grab a short-lived one point lead. But they could not hang on in the last 2:30 of the game, as they only scored one point during that span. Tobias Harris added 23 points, while All-Star center Jalen Duren continued to struggle with just 8 points on 3-for-10 shooting. The Magic are just the 13th eighth-seed to hold a 2–1 series lead over a first-seed in NBA history.

NBC/Peacock

April 27
8:00 p.m.

Recap

Detroit Pistons 88, Orlando Magic 94
Scoring by quarter: 27–26, 25–28, 17–21, 19–19
Pts: Cade Cunningham 25; Rebs: Cunningham, Thompson 9 each Asts: Cade Cunningham 6	Pts: Desmond Bane 22; Rebs: Wendell Carter Jr. 11; Asts: Banchero, Carter Jr. 4 each
Orlando leads series, 3–1

Kia Center, Orlando, FL
Attendance: 19,040
Referees: Scott Foster, Gediminas Petraitis, Eric Dalen

The Magic put the top-seeded Pistons on the edge of elimination with a 94–88 win at the Kia Center in Game 5. The two teams were locked in a defensive battle in the final quarter, when Desmond Bane launched a successful 3-point shot from 29-feet away with 1:33 remaining to put Orlando up six points. Bane led the team with 22 points on 5 for 10 from 3-point range. Reserve Jamal Cain had the highlight of the game with his poster dunk on Pistons center Jalen Duren, which was nicknamed the "Raising Cain" dunk after the food chain with the same name. Cade Cunningham had a near triple-double with 25–9–6, but continued to struggle with turning the ball over, as he had eight turnovers in total (his 24 turnovers in a three-game span was an NBA playoff record and is now averaging 6.8 per game so far in the series). In the final minutes of the game, Duren was benched for Isaiah Stewart, who had a career-high eight blocks in just 17 minutes. The Pistons look to join the 2002–03 Pistons as the only teams in franchise history to comeback from a 3–1 deficit, which coincidentally, also came against Orlando.

Prime

April 29
7:00 p.m.

Recap

Orlando Magic 109, Detroit Pistons 116
Scoring by quarter: 26–38, 34–28, 19–23, 30–27
Pts: Paolo Banchero 45; Rebs: Paolo Banchero 9 Asts: Paolo Banchero 7	Pts: Cade Cunningham 45; Rebs: Ausar Thompson 15; Asts: Ausar Thompson 6
Orlando leads series, 3–2

Little Caesars Arena, Detroit, MI
Attendance: 20,062
Referees: John Goble, Curtis Blair, Kevin Cutler

Cade Cunningham, 45 points on 13-of-23 shooting, out-dueled Paolo Banchero, 45 points on 17-of-31 shooting, as the Pistons never trailed and won Game 5 to stay alive in the series. Cunningham and Banchero became just the second set of players with dueling 45-point performances in NBA playoff history. The former also shot 5-of-8 from three, added 4 rebounds and 5 assists, but still struggled with turnovers with 6. The latter had 9 rebounds, 6 assists, and also finished with 6 turnovers. Cunningham's 45 points was a Pistons playoff record. Orlando was without Franz Wagner, who strained his left calf in Game 4. The Magic fell to 0–10 in franchise history on the road in a Game 5.

Prime

May 1
7:00 p.m.

Recap

Detroit Pistons 93, Orlando Magic 79
Scoring by quarter: 26–25, 12–35, 24–11, 31–8
Pts: Cade Cunningham 32; Rebs: Cunningham, Harris, Thompson 10 each Asts: Ausar Thompson 6	Pts: Banchero, Bane 17 each Rebs: Paolo Banchero 10; Asts: Jalen Suggs 7
Series tied, 3–3

Kia Center, Orlando, FL
Attendance: 19,040
Referees: Zach Zarba, Sean Wright, Jacyn Goble

As with 2003, the Pistons forced a Game 7 after trailing 3–1 against the Magic. After a tightly contested first quarter, Orlando dominated the second quarter, outscoring Detroit 35–12 and taking a 22-point halftime lead, with their lead growing to as much as 24 early in the third quarter. However, the Pistons would cut the lead to 9 by the end of the third, and ultimately took over the game entirely in the fourth quarter, as the Magic scored a total of 19 points in the second half, with just 8 in the fourth quarter. In addition, Orlando missed an NBA playoff record 23 consecutive field goals and went 1 of 20 from the field in the fourth quarter, with their only basket being an open dunk from Paolo Banchero with Detroit already having seized the lead. This comeback by the Pistons marked the greatest comeback for a team facing elimination on the road in the playoffs, where they would force a Game 7 back at Little Caesars Arena. It marked a 38-point turnaround as they won the game 93–79, with fans in the Kia Center booing the team's abysmal offense and ultimate collapse. The Magic's blown 24-point lead was the second most for a team with a chance to close out the series, only under the Utah Jazz in the 2018 NBA playoffs, where they blew a 25-point lead in a Game 5 loss to the Oklahoma City Thunder. Cade Cunningham lead the team with 32 points, whereas Duncan Robinson made four of the team's nine 3-pointers, and Ausar Thompson contributed 10 rebounds, 6 assists and 4 blocks despite scoring just 4 points, with his interior paint presence anchoring Detroit's defense in the second half.

ABC

May 3
3:30 p.m.

Recap

Orlando Magic 94, Detroit Pistons 116
Scoring by quarter: 22–20, 27–40, 15–23, 30–33
Pts: Paolo Banchero 38; Rebs: Paolo Banchero 9 Asts: Paolo Banchero 6	Pts: Cade Cunningham 32; Rebs: Jalen Duren 15; Asts: Cade Cunningham 12
Detroit wins series, 4–3

Little Caesars Arena, Detroit, MI
Attendance: 20,062
Referees: Tony Brothers, Josh Tiven, Mitchell Ervin

As with 2003, the Pistons won Game 7 to overcome a 3–1 series deficit against the Magic in the first round, becoming the 15th team to overcome a 3–1 series deficit. Cade Cunningham had 32 points and 12 assists with a team high plus-29 and Tobias Harris added 30 points on 5 of 7 from 3-point range. Paolo Banchero continued to excel in the series, as he scored 38 of Orlando's 94 points on 14-of-25 shooting, as well as leading the team in points, assist and rebounds, but the team around him struggled and did not have Franz Wagner available for a third straight game. The Pistons improved to 5–0 lifetime in Game 7s, with none of their opponents breaking the 100-point barrier. This was their first playoff series win since 2008, which also came against the Magic. Orlando scored just 113 points in the final six quarters of the series. A day after the loss, the Magic fired head coach Jamahl Mosley.

Regular-season series
Tied 2–2 in the regular-season series

October 29, 2025

Recap

Orlando Magic 116, Detroit Pistons 135

Little Caesars Arena, Detroit, MI

November 18, 2025

Recap

Orlando Magic 112, Detroit Pistons 109

Little Caesars Arena, Detroit, MI

March 1, 2026

Recap

Detroit Pistons 106, Orlando Magic 92

Kia Center, Orlando, FL

April 6, 2026

Recap

Detroit Pistons 107, Orlando Magic 123

Kia Center, Orlando, FL

This was the fifth playoff meeting between these two teams, with the Pistons winning three of the first four meetings.

Previous playoff series
Detroit leads 3–1 in all-time playoff series

1996

Orlando Magic 3, Detroit Pistons 0

1996 Eastern Conference First Round

2003

Detroit Pistons 4, Orlando Magic 3

2003 Eastern Conference First Round

2007

Detroit Pistons 4, Orlando Magic 0

2007 Eastern Conference First Round

2008

Detroit Pistons 4, Orlando Magic 1

2008 Eastern Conference Semifinals

==== (2) Boston Celtics vs. (7) Philadelphia 76ers ====
ABC

April 19
1:00 p.m.

Recap

Philadelphia 76ers 91, Boston Celtics 123
Scoring by quarter: 18–33, 28–31, 25–31, 20–28
Pts: Tyrese Maxey 21; Rebs: Kelly Oubre Jr. 7 Asts: Tyrese Maxey 8	Pts: Jaylen Brown 26; Rebs: Jayson Tatum 11; Asts: Jayson Tatum 7
Boston leads series, 1–0

TD Garden, Boston, MA
Attendance: 19,156
Referees: Scott Foster, Pat Fraher, Tre Maddox

Coming off his first playoff game following an Achilles tendon rupture, Jayson Tatum finished with 25 points, 11 rebounds and 7 assists, while Jaylen Brown led the team in scoring with 26 points as the Celtics took a comfortable 123–91 victory over the short-handed 76ers, who were missing Joel Embiid following appendicitis surgery with an indefinite timeline for return. Tyrese Maxey scored 21 points, a team high for Philadelphia, and dished out 8 assists. Boston's defense held strong against the 76ers, limiting them to just 18 points in the first quarter, and an abysmal 17 percent shooting from 3-point range, with Philadelphia going just 4–23 from beyond the arc. This would mark the 24th playoff series between the two teams, the most in NBA history.

Peacock/NBCSN

April 21
7:00 p.m.

Recap

Philadelphia 76ers 111, Boston Celtics 97
Scoring by quarter: 25–28, 37–26, 22–23, 27–20
Pts: V. J. Edgecombe 30; Rebs: V. J. Edgecombe 10; Asts: Tyrese Maxey 9	Pts: Jaylen Brown 36; Rebs: Jayson Tatum 14; Asts: Jayson Tatum 9
Series tied, 1–1

TD Garden, Boston, MA
Attendance: 19,156
Referees: Marc Davis, Sean Wright, Marat Kogut

Midway through the second quarter, the 76ers took the lead and never relinquished it for the remainder of the game, as they tied the series with a 111–97 win. Rookie V. J. Edgecombe made six of Philadelphia's 19 3-pointers and scored 30 points overall on 12-for-20 shooting, to go along with 10 rebounds. Starting backcourt teammate, Tyrese Maxey, added 29 points, and Paul George chipped in with 19. The Celtics got within two points in the fourth quarter before an 11–0 run put the 76ers back in front by 13 with just over four minutes to play. Jaylen Brown led Boston with 36 points. Jayson Tatum had 19 points on 19 shot attempts, 14 rebounds and nine assists. The Celtics shot just 26 percent from three.

Prime

April 24
7:00 p.m.

Recap

Boston Celtics 108, Philadelphia 76ers 100
Scoring by quarter: 29–24, 25–23, 25–27, 29–26
Pts: Brown, Tatum 25 each Rebs: Brown, Queta 7 each Asts: Jayson Tatum 7	Pts: Tyrese Maxey 31; Rebs: V. J. Edgecombe 10; Asts: Tyrese Maxey 6
Boston leads series, 2–1

Xfinity Mobile Arena, Philadelphia, PA
Attendance: 19,017
Referees: John Goble, Brent Barnaky, Andy Nagy

Following a late surge by Philadelphia, Jayson Tatum hit two massive 3-pointers to silence the home crowd, including the dagger with 25 seconds remaining to officially seal the win for Boston. Jaylen Brown continued his strong form, scoring 25 points which matched a team high with Tatum. The 76ers were missing Joel Embiid for the 3rd straight game due to appendicitis. Tyrese Maxey led Philadelphia with 31 points, while Paul George added 18. Coming off his outstanding performance in Game 2, rookie V. J. Edgecombe finished with 10 points and 10 rebounds, but shot 5 of 17 from the field and 0 of 7 from 3-point range.

NBC/Peacock

April 26
7:00 p.m.

Recap

Boston Celtics 128, Philadelphia 76ers 96
Scoring by quarter: 34–18, 22–20, 39–36, 33–22
Pts: Payton Pritchard 32; Rebs: Neemias Queta 8 Asts: Jayson Tatum 11	Pts: Joel Embiid 26; Rebs: Joel Embiid 10; Asts: Embiid, Grimes, Maxey 6 each
Boston leads series, 3–1

Xfinity Mobile Arena, Philadelphia, PA
Attendance: 19,746
Referees: Josh Tiven, Ed Malloy, Mark Lindsay

The return of Joel Embiid provided futile for Philadelphia, as the Celtics blew out the 76ers 128–96 to take a 3–1 series lead. Payton Pritchard shined off the bench, scoring 32 points on 12-for-21 shooting and 6 of 12 from 3-point range, including a first quarter buzzer-beater to put Boston up 34–18. Jayson Tatum continued his strong showing in the series, scoring 30 points, along with 7 rebounds and 11 assists to lead all starters. Tatum, Jaylen Brown who finished with 20 points, and Pritchard scored all of the Celtics' 39 points in the third quarter to push their lead to 31 entering the fourth. Embiid finished with 26 points in his first game back, and Tyrese Maxey had 22. Boston dominated Philadelphia on the boards 51–30, while shooting 45% from 3-point range on 53 attempts, whereas the 76ers went just 9–30.

ESPN

April 28
7:00 p.m.

Recap

Philadelphia 76ers 113, Boston Celtics 97
Scoring by quarter: 21–23, 29–34, 35–29, 28–11
Pts: Joel Embiid 33; Rebs: Tyrese Maxey 10; Asts: Joel Embiid 8	Pts: Jayson Tatum 24; Rebs: Jayson Tatum 16; Asts: Payton Pritchard 6
Boston leads series, 3–2

TD Garden, Boston, MA
Attendance: 19,156
Referees: James Williams, Kevin Scott, Brian Forte

The 76ers kept their season alive behind a 33-point, 8-assist effort from Joel Embiid. Helping Embiid out was Tyrese Maxey, who added 25 points on 10-for-18 shooting. The Celtics led by 11 in the second quarter and held a 13-point lead early in the third, but the 76ers rallied with a 15–3 run in the middle of the period to get back in the game. From there, Philadelphia outscored Boston 28–11 in the fourth quarter, with the Celtics shooting 3 of 22 in the quarter.

Peacock/NBCSN

April 30
8:00 p.m.

Recap

Boston Celtics 93, Philadelphia 76ers 106
Scoring by quarter: 23–20, 26–38, 14–24, 30–24
Pts: Jaylen Brown 18; Rebs: Queta, Tatum 11 each Asts: Payton Pritchard 5	Pts: Tyrese Maxey 30; Rebs: Joel Embiid 10; Asts: Joel Embiid 8
Series tied, 3–3

Xfinity Mobile Arena, Philadelphia, PA
Attendance: 19,746
Referees: Marc Davis, Nick Buchert, Ray Acosta

With momentum still on their side, the 76ers defeated the Celtics at Xfinity Mobile Arena to even the series at 3 apiece. Tyrese Maxey scored 30 points and Paul George had 23 points for the 76ers. Jayson Tatum, who had 17 points and 11 rebounds, suffered a left calf injury in the game and did not return. Game 7 will be the ninth such game in the 76ers–Celtics history.

NBC/Peacock

May 2
7:30 p.m.

Recap

Philadelphia 76ers 109, Boston Celtics 100
Scoring by quarter: 32–19, 23–31, 33–25, 21–25
Pts: Joel Embiid 34; Rebs: Joel Embiid 12; Asts: Tyrese Maxey 7	Pts: Jaylen Brown 33; Rebs: Neemias Queta 12; Asts: Payton Pritchard 7
Philadelphia wins series, 4–3

TD Garden, Boston, MA
Attendance: 19,156
Referees: James Capers, Tyler Ford, Gediminas Petraitis

The 76ers picked up their first playoff series win over the Celtics since 1982 (which was also a Game 7 in Boston) and their first Game 7 win since 2001, with a 109–100 road victory. The duo of Joel Embiid and Tyrese Maxey led the way for Philadelphia, as they held off a fourth quarter rally by Jaylen Brown and Boston. Embiid, in his first Game 7 win of his career after going 0–3 previously, had 34 points, 11 rebounds and 6 assists. Maxey took over in the final minutes of a close game, scoring 8 of his 30 points in the last two minutes, and turning a one-point lead into an eventual nine-point win. Also in the final few minutes, the Celtics had six possessions where they trailed by one-point, but could not score to take the lead. Brown led the team with 33 points and had 9 rebounds. They struggled once again from 3-point range, shooting 27 percent as a team. They were also without Jayson Tatum due to a calf and knee injury he sustained in Game 6.

This was the first 3–1 series comeback in 76ers' playoff history, after it being done to them twice, coincidentally by the Celtics in 1968 and 1981, and the first in the NBA since the Denver Nuggets accomplished this feat twice in the 2020 NBA bubble. This was also the first time the Celtics lost a series after being up 3–1.

Regular-season series
Tied 2–2 in the regular-season series

October 22, 2025

Recap

Philadelphia 76ers 117, Boston Celtics 116

TD Garden, Boston, MA

October 31, 2025

Recap

Boston Celtics 109, Philadelphia 76ers 108

Xfinity Mobile Arena, Philadelphia, PA

November 11, 2025

Recap

Boston Celtics 100, Philadelphia 76ers 102

Xfinity Mobile Arena, Philadelphia, PA

March 1, 2026

Recap

Philadelphia 76ers 98, Boston Celtics 114

TD Garden, Boston, MA

This was the 24th playoff meeting between these two teams, and the 16th since the Syracuse Nationals relocated to Philadelphia in 1963, with the Celtics winning 15 of the first 23 meetings.

Previous playoffs series
Boston leads 15–8 in all-time playoff series

1953

Syracuse Nationals 0, Boston Celtics 2

1953 Eastern Division Semifinals

1954

Boston Celtics 0, Syracuse Nationals 2

1954 Eastern Division Round Robin Semifinals

1954

Syracuse Nationals 2, Boston Celtics 0

1954 Eastern Division Finals

1955

Syracuse Nationals 3, Boston Celtics 1

1955 Eastern Division Finals

1956

Boston Celtics 1, Syracuse Nationals 2

1956 Eastern Division Semifinals

1957

Boston Celtics 3, Syracuse Nationals 0

1957 Eastern Division Finals

1959

Boston Celtics 4, Syracuse Nationals 3

1959 Eastern Division Finals

1961

Boston Celtics 4, Syracuse Nationals 1

1961 Eastern Division Finals

1965

Boston Celtics 4, Philadelphia 76ers 3

1965 Eastern Division Finals

1966

Philadelphia 76ers 1, Boston Celtics 4

1966 Eastern Division Finals

1967

Philadelphia 76ers 4, Boston Celtics 1

1967 Eastern Division Finals

1968

Philadelphia 76ers 3, Boston Celtics 4

1968 Eastern Division Finals

1969

Philadelphia 76ers 1, Boston Celtics 4

1969 Eastern Division Semifinals

1977

Philadelphia 76ers 4, Boston Celtics 3

1977 Eastern Conference Semifinals

1980

Boston Celtics 1, Philadelphia 76ers 4

1980 Eastern Conference Finals

1981

Boston Celtics 4, Philadelphia 76ers 3

1981 Eastern Conference Finals

1982

Boston Celtics 3, Philadelphia 76ers 4

1982 Eastern Conference Finals

1985

Boston Celtics 4, Philadelphia 76ers 1

1985 Eastern Conference Finals

2002

Boston Celtics 3, Philadelphia 76ers 2

2002 Eastern Conference First Round

2012

Boston Celtics 4, Philadelphia 76ers 3

2012 Eastern Conference Semifinals

2018

Boston Celtics 4, Philadelphia 76ers 1

2018 Eastern Conference Semifinals

2020

Boston Celtics 4, Philadelphia 76ers 0

2020 Eastern Conference First Round

2023

Boston Celtics 4, Philadelphia 76ers 3

2023 Eastern Conference Semifinals

==== (3) New York Knicks vs. (6) Atlanta Hawks ====
Prime

April 18
6:00 p.m.

Recap

Atlanta Hawks 102, New York Knicks 113
Scoring by quarter: 24–30, 31–27, 19–26, 28–30
Pts: CJ McCollum 26; Rebs: Dyson Daniels 9 Asts: Dyson Daniels 11	Pts: Jalen Brunson 28; Rebs: Josh Hart 14; Asts: Jalen Brunson 7
New York leads series, 1–0

Madison Square Garden, New York, NY
Attendance: 19,812
Referees: John Goble, Curtis Blair, Ray Acosta

Jalen Brunson made his mark early in the game, scoring 19 points in the 1st quarter alone and finishing with 28 points on the night. A two point game at halftime, the Knicks' lead grew to as much as 19 in the fourth quarter. Despite a late 11–0 run by Atlanta late in the 4th to cut the lead to 8, New York quickly responded and manage to take a comfortable 113–102 victory, leading for the majority of the game. Karl-Anthony Towns added an all-around performance of 25 points, 8 rebounds and 3 blocks, as all 5 Knicks starters finished in double figures. For the Hawks, CJ McCollum led the team in scoring with 26 points, whereas Jalen Johnson added 23.

NBC/Peacock

April 20
8:00 p.m.

Recap

Atlanta Hawks 107, New York Knicks 106
Scoring by quarter: 23–32, 31–29, 25–30, 28–15
Pts: CJ McCollum 32; Rebs: Johnson, Okongwu 8 each Asts: Alexander-Walker, McCollum 6 each	Pts: Jalen Brunson 29; Rebs: Josh Hart 13; Asts: Jalen Brunson 7
Series tied, 1–1

Madison Square Garden, New York, NY
Attendance: 19,812
Referees: Zach Zarba, Karl Lane, John Butler

CJ McCollum became the latest Madison Square Garden villain, as he jawed former teammate Jose Alvarado and Knicks fans while leading a late fourth quarter surge to even the series at 1 apiece. The Hawks had trailed the whole second half and were down 12 after three quarters but outscored the Knicks 28–15 in the final quarter. McCollum scored 32 points on 12-for-22 shooting. Off the bench, Jonathan Kuminga added 19 points on 7-for-12 shooting. For New York, Jalen Brunson had 29 points on 10-for-26 shooting and 7 assists.

McCollum had missed two free throws, as the Hawks led by one with 5.6 seconds remaining, but Mikal Bridges missed a contested jump shot that would have given the Knicks the win. During this period, NBC's broadcast erroneously displayed New York having one timeout remaining, despite it already being used with 10.2 seconds remaining.

Prime

April 23
7:00 p.m.

Recap

New York Knicks 108, Atlanta Hawks 109
Scoring by quarter: 21–33, 29–25, 30–30, 28–21
Pts: OG Anunoby 29; Rebs: Karl-Anthony Towns 17; Asts: Josh Hart 6	Pts: Jalen Johnson 24; Rebs: Dyson Daniels 13; Asts: Jalen Johnson 8
Atlanta leads series, 2–1

State Farm Arena, Atlanta, GA
Attendance: 18,452
Referees: Marc Davis, Nick Buchert, Natalie Sago

In their first home playoff game since 2023, the Hawks took control early in the first quarter, building a 33–21 lead which later expanded to as much as 18 points. However, the Knicks were able to cut the lead to just 8 points at halftime and managed to retake the lead with just over a minute remaining in the 4th quarter following Jalen Brunson's 3-point play. However, Atlanta was able to score on their next possession, while forcing Brunson into a shot clock turnover on the other end of the floor. CJ McCollum, who earned villain chants back in Madison Square Garden, drilled the go-ahead mid-range jumper with 12 seconds remaining to give the Hawks the eventual win. The Knicks still had a chance to win the game, but Brunson had his pass pickpocketed by Jonathan Kuminga, allowing Atlanta to stave off what would be a furious comeback for New York as they took a 2–1 series lead. OG Anunoby led New York with a game-high 29 points, while Brunson had 26 and Karl-Anthony Towns collected a double-double of 21 points and 17 rebounds. However, Josh Hart and Mikal Bridges both struggled, going a combined 1 of 12 from the field alongside 6 turnovers. Jalen Johnson scored a team-high 24 for Atlanta, whereas McCollum added 23.

NBC/Peacock

April 25
6:00 p.m.

Recap

New York Knicks 114, Atlanta Hawks 98
Scoring by quarter: 27–20, 31–24, 28–21, 28–33
Pts: OG Anunoby 22; Rebs: Anunoby, Towns 10 each Asts: Karl-Anthony Towns 10	Pts: CJ McCollum 17; Rebs: Dyson Daniels 9 Asts: Dyson Daniels 6
Series tied, 2–2

State Farm Arena, Atlanta, GA
Attendance: 18,763
Referees: Scott Foster, Gediminas Petraitis, Sean Corbin

Facing a potential 3–1 series deficit on the road, the Knicks took the lead in the first quarter and never relinquished it, with a comfortable 14-point lead at halftime en route to a 114–98 victory to even the series at 2 apiece. Karl-Anthony Towns became the third Knicks player to record a playoff triple-double, finishing with 20 points, 10 rebounds and 10 assists, joining Walt Frazier and Josh Hart as the only players to do so. OG Anunoby once again led New York in scoring with 22 points, and Jalen Brunson added 19 despite committing 6 turnovers. CJ McCollum led Atlanta in scoring with 17 points, whereas the newly named Most Improved Player Nickeil Alexander-Walker finished with 15. The Hawks' offense struggled greatly throughout the night, committing 18 turnovers and shooting just 10 of 41 (24%) from 3-point range.

NBC/Peacock

April 28
8:00 p.m.

Recap

Atlanta Hawks 97, New York Knicks 126
Scoring by quarter: 22–35, 26–29, 24–26, 25–36
Pts: Jalen Johnson 18; Rebs: Jalen Johnson 10; Asts: Jalen Johnson 6	Pts: Jalen Brunson 39; Rebs: Karl-Anthony Towns 14; Asts: Jalen Brunson 8
New York leads series, 3–2

Madison Square Garden, New York, NY
Attendance: 19,812
Referees: Josh Tiven, Courtney Kirkland, Justin Van Duyne

Jalen Brunson (39 points) just missed extending his franchise record for 40-point playoff games, as the Knicks routed the Hawks, 126–97, to take a 3–2 series lead. OG Anunoby added 17 points and 10 rebounds for New York, while Karl-Anthony Towns had 16 points, 14 rebounds and six assists. CJ McCollum had his worst game of the series with just 6 points. Atlanta had a balanced effort with Jalen Johnson, Dyson Daniels, Nickeil Alexander-Walker and Onyeka Okongwu all scoring within 16–18 points, but the Knicks dominated the glass, outrebounding the Hawks, 48–27.

ESPN

April 30
7:00 p.m.

Recap

New York Knicks 140, Atlanta Hawks 89
Scoring by quarter: 40–15, 43–21, 34–28, 23–25
Pts: OG Anunoby 29; Rebs: Karl-Anthony Towns 11; Asts: Karl-Anthony Towns 10	Pts: Jalen Johnson 21; Rebs: Jalen Johnson 8 Asts: Jalen Johnson 6
New York wins series, 4–2

State Farm Arena, Atlanta, GA
Attendance: 17,685
Referees: James Williams, Kevin Scott, Brent Barnaky

New York easily dispatched Atlanta and clinched their first-round series win on the road for the third straight postseason. They led by as many as 61 points before winning the game by a 51-point margin. Their 47-point lead at halftime also broke a record previously set by both the 2017 Cleveland Cavaliers (Game 2, East Finals) and the 2025 Indiana Pacers (Game 4, East Semifinals). OG Anunoby led his team with 29 points as the Knicks had the largest playoff victory in franchise history. They almost never trailed the entire game, as the Hawks led 11–9 in the first quarter before they were outscored by 49 points entering halftime, only scoring 36 points in the first half and committing 14 turnovers. The Knicks also became the first NBA Cup champion to win a playoff series.

Regular-season series
New York won 2–1 in the regular-season series

December 27, 2025

Recap

New York Knicks 128, Atlanta Hawks 125

State Farm Arena, Atlanta, GA

January 2, 2026

Recap

Atlanta Hawks 111, New York Knicks 99

Madison Square Garden, New York, NY

April 6, 2026

Recap

New York Knicks 108, Atlanta Hawks 105

State Farm Arena, Atlanta, GA

This was the fourth playoff meeting between these two teams, with the Knicks winning two of the first three meetings.

Previous playoff series
New York leads 2–1 in all-time playoff series

1971

New York Knicks 4, Atlanta Hawks 1

1971 Eastern Conference semifinals

1999

Atlanta Hawks 0, New York Knicks 4

1999 Eastern Conference semifinals

2021

New York Knicks 1, Atlanta Hawks 4

2021 Eastern Conference first round

==== (4) Cleveland Cavaliers vs. (5) Toronto Raptors ====
Prime, SN1

April 18
1:00 p.m.

Recap

Toronto Raptors 113, Cleveland Cavaliers 126
Scoring by quarter: 31–35, 23–26, 22–36, 37–29
Pts: RJ Barrett 24; Rebs: Sandro Mamukelashvili 8 Asts: Scottie Barnes 7	Pts: Donovan Mitchell 32; Rebs: Allen, Mobley 7 each Asts: James Harden 10
Cleveland leads series, 1–0

Rocket Arena, Cleveland, OH
Attendance: 19,432
Referees: Tony Brothers, Karl Lane, Brent Barnaky

The Raptors were without starting point guard Immanuel Quickley due to a mild hamstring strain that occurred on the last day of the regular season.

In their first playoff game together, the star duo of James Harden and Donovan Mitchell led the Cavaliers to a 126–113 win over the Raptors in Game 1. Harden, Cleveland's mid-season trade acquisition, had 22 points on 8-for-18 shooting and 10 assists and Mitchell scored 32 points on 11-for-20 shooting. Evan Mobley added 17 points and 7 rebounds, center Jarrett Allen scored 10 points with 7 rebounds, and Max Strus scored 24 points off the bench on 8-for-10 shooting (4 of 6 from three). At halftime the score was 61–54 in favor of the Cavs, but the Raptors' poor third quarter saw them outscored in the quarter 36–22, as Cleveland's lead grew to as much as 24. Mitchell scored at least 30 points in an NBA-record nine straight series openers. Toronto fell to 2–12 lifetime in Game 1s.

Peacock/NBCSN, TSN

April 20
7:00 p.m.

Recap

Toronto Raptors 105, Cleveland Cavaliers 115
Scoring by quarter: 19–26, 29–28, 29–30, 28–31
Pts: Scottie Barnes 26; Rebs: Sandro Mamukelashvili 10; Asts: Barnes, Barrett 5 each	Pts: Donovan Mitchell 30; Rebs: Evan Mobley 8 Asts: Donovan Mitchell 5
Cleveland leads series, 2–0

Rocket Arena, Cleveland, OH
Attendance: 19,432
Referees: James Capers, Nick Buchert, Kevin Cutler

The trio of Donovan Mitchell (30 points on 13-for-23 shooting and 7 rebounds), James Harden (29 points on 9-for-14 shooting and 5 steals) and Evan Mobley (25 points on 11-for-13 shooting and 8 rebounds) led the Cavaliers to a 10-point Game 2 win over the Raptors. This was Cleveland's 12th straight postseason win over Toronto. Raptors forwards Scottie Barnes (26 points on 11-of-19 shooting) and RJ Barrett (22 points on 11-for-13 shooting and 9 rebounds) led the team in scoring. Toronto's other starting forward, Brandon Ingram, struggled mightily, scoring just 7 points on 3-for-15 shooting. Mitchell has now scored 30 points or more in 33 of 65 playoff games in his career.

Prime, SN1

April 23
8:00 p.m.

Recap

Cleveland Cavaliers 104, Toronto Raptors 126
Scoring by quarter: 25–31, 29–23, 27–29, 23–43
Pts: James Harden 18; Rebs: Mobley, Strus 6 each Asts: Evan Mobley 7	Pts: Barnes, Barrett 33 each Rebs: Collin Murray-Boyles 8 Asts: Scottie Barnes 11
Cleveland leads series, 2–1

Scotiabank Arena, Toronto, ON
Attendance: 19,800
Referees: Josh Tiven, Courtney Kirkland, Pat Fraher

Following a closely contested first three quarters, the Raptors blew the game open in the 4th, outscoring the Cavaliers 43–23 and subsequently preventing themselves from falling into a dreaded 3–0 deficit. Scottie Barnes proved invaluable in the victory, with 33 points, 11 assists and 11-of-17 shooting from the field, whereas his teammate RJ Barrett also scored 33, with the two players shooting a combined 9 of 13 from 3-point range. James Harden led Cleveland with 18 points, as no other Cavalier reached over 15 points. In addition, they shot 14 of 45 from 3-point range, compared to 14 of 23 by the Raptors. With this loss, this also denied the Cavaliers a chance to set an NBA playoff record for most consecutive playoff wins over an opponent, with this mark previously being tied at 12, dating back to LeBron James' second tenure with the team. This would be Toronto's third straight game without Immanuel Quickley due to a hamstring injury.

ESPN, TSN

April 26
1:00 p.m.

Recap

Cleveland Cavaliers 89, Toronto Raptors 93
Scoring by quarter: 17–14, 19–24, 22–22, 31–33
Pts: Donovan Mitchell 20; Rebs: Jarrett Allen 15; Asts: James Harden 8	Pts: Barnes, Ingram 23 each Rebs: Collin Murray-Boyles 10; Asts: Scottie Barnes 6
Series tied, 2–2

Scotiabank Arena, Toronto, ON
Attendance: 19,800
Referees: John Goble, Curtis Blair, Ray Acosta

The Raptors were able to tie the series against the Cavaliers at two apiece after a tightly contested game, which was notable for poor efficiency on both sides (63 combined field goals were made of 184 attempts). Toronto were 0 of 11 on three-pointers in the first quarter – the worst playoff quarter in team history in this metric – and finished with 4–30. Despite that, Brandon Ingram hit a buzzer-beater from beyond the arc to elevate the Raptors to a 38–36 halftime lead. They closed out with a 17–5 scoring run in the final 5 minutes. Ingram and Scottie Barnes led the score sheet for Toronto by scoring 23 points each, while rookie Collin Murray-Boyles recorded a double-double by scoring 15 points and 10 rebounds. Ja'Kobe Walter, however, notched a career high in minutes played without scoring (27). For Cleveland's starters, only star guards Donovan Mitchell and James Harden finished in double figures with 20 and 19 points, respectively, but also combined for 11 turnovers, while Jarrett Allen recorded the most rebounds (15) in the entire game.

ESPN, SN1

April 29
7:30 p.m.

Recap

Toronto Raptors 120, Cleveland Cavaliers 125
Scoring by quarter: 34–38, 40–29, 29–33, 17–25
Pts: RJ Barrett 25; Rebs: RJ Barrett 12; Asts: Scottie Barnes 11	Pts: Harden, Mobley 23 each Rebs: Harden, Mobley 9 each Asts: James Harden 5
Cleveland leads series, 3–2

Rocket Arena, Cleveland, OH
Attendance: 19,432
Referees: Scott Foster, Sean Wright, Gediminas Petraitis

Journeyman backup point guard Dennis Schröder scored 11 of his 19 points in the fourth quarter and Evan Mobley hit a pair of big 3-pointers to give the Cavaliers a narrow 125–120 win back at home. The Raptors led 74–67 at halftime and extended their lead by scoring the first five points in the third quarter; however, Cleveland rallied back to cut Toronto's lead to 103–100 entering the fourth. In the final quarter, the Raptors missed their first 11 shots. James Harden chipped in with 23 points, but his 6 turnovers now gave him 30 for the series. RJ Barrett led the Raptors with 25 points, with Ja'Kobe Walter adding 20 and Jamal Shead scoring 18 off the bench. Brandon Ingram exited the game in the second quarter with right heel inflammation and did not return.

Prime, TSN

May 1
7:30 p.m.

Recap

Cleveland Cavaliers 110, Toronto Raptors 112 (OT)
Scoring by quarter: 32–32, 19–29, 30–31, 23–12, Overtime: 6–8
Pts: Evan Mobley 26; Rebs: Evan Mobley 14; Asts: James Harden 9	Pts: Scottie Barnes 25; Rebs: RJ Barrett 9 Asts: Scottie Barnes 14
Series tied, 3–3

Scotiabank Arena, Toronto, ON
Attendance: 19,919
Referees: Tony Brothers, Mitchell Ervin, Justin Van Duyne

RJ Barrett's game-winning 3-pointer in overtime gave the Raptors the Game 6 win and tied the series at 3–3. Barrett's three, which was similar to Kawhi Leonard's game and series winning shot against the Philadelphia 76ers in the 2019 Eastern Conference Semifinals, hit the rim, bounced high in the air, and fell in with 1.2 seconds left. On the Cavaliers' final possession, Evan Mobley, who scored a team-high 26 points, missed a three at the top of the key that would have given the team the walk-off series win. Scottie Barnes led Toronto with 25 points and 14 assists, Barrett chipped in with 24 points, and Ja'Kobe Walter scored 23 in a career-high 43 minutes, as the team was without All-Star Brandon Ingram due to a heel injury. Donovan Mitchell had 24 points for Cleveland but took 26 shots. Game 7 will be the Raptors first such game since the 2020 Eastern Conference Semifinals against the Celtics. The Cavaliers last played a Game 7 against the Orlando Magic in the first round in 2024.

NBC/Peacock, SN1

May 3
7:30 p.m.

Recap

Toronto Raptors 102, Cleveland Cavaliers 114
Scoring by quarter: 26–24, 23–25, 19–38, 34–27
Pts: Scottie Barnes 24; Rebs: Scottie Barnes 9 Asts: Jamal Shead 7	Pts: Allen, Mitchell 22 each Rebs: Jarrett Allen 19; Asts: Max Strus 5
Cleveland wins series, 4–3

Rocket Arena, Cleveland, OH
Attendance: 19,432
Referees: Zach Zarba, Curtis Blair, Nick Buchert

Jarrett Allen tied a playoff career high with 22 points and grabbed 19 rebounds as the Cavaliers advanced to their third consecutive Eastern Conference Semifinals in a 114–102 win in Game 7. Donovan Mitchell led the team with 22 points and James Harden added 18. The Raptors, who were again without starters Brandon Ingram and Immanuel Quickley, led for most of the first half and had a 10-point lead midway through the second quarter before Cleveland began their comeback. Scottie Barnes led Toronto in points (24) and rebounds (9). The home team won every game in the series for the first time since the Magic–Cavs first round series from 2024.

Regular-season series
Toronto won 3–0 in the regular-season series

October 31, 2025

Recap

Toronto Raptors 112, Cleveland Cavaliers 101

Rocket Arena, Cleveland, OH

November 13, 2025

Recap

Toronto Raptors 126, Cleveland Cavaliers 113

Rocket Arena, Cleveland, OH

November 24, 2025

Recap

Cleveland Cavaliers 99, Toronto Raptors 110

Scotiabank Arena, Toronto, ON

This was the fourth playoff meeting between these two teams, with the Cavaliers winning the first three meetings.

Previous playoff series
Cleveland leads 3–0 in all-time playoff series

2016

Cleveland Cavaliers 4, Toronto Raptors 2

2016 Eastern Conference Finals

2017

Cleveland Cavaliers 4, Toronto Raptors 0

2017 Eastern Conference Semifinals

2018

Toronto Raptors 0, Cleveland Cavaliers 4

2018 Eastern Conference Semifinals

=== Western Conference first round ===
==== (1) Oklahoma City Thunder vs. (8) Phoenix Suns ====
ABC

April 19
3:30 p.m. (2:30 p.m. CDT)

Recap

Phoenix Suns 84, Oklahoma City Thunder 119
Scoring by quarter: 20–35, 24–30, 22–32, 18–22
Pts: Devin Booker 23; Rebs: Oso Ighodaro 9 Asts: Ighodaro, O'Neale 3 each	Pts: Shai Gilgeous-Alexander 25; Rebs: Isaiah Hartenstein 8 Asts: Shai Gilgeous-Alexander 7
Oklahoma City leads series, 1–0

Paycom Center, Oklahoma City, OK
Attendance: 18,203
Referees: Marc Davis, Sean Wright, Mark Lindsay

The Thunder began their title defense with a 119–84 rout of the Suns. The Suns had an early first quarter lead at 12–9 in the opening minutes, but the Thunder proceeded to outscore them the rest of the game 110–72. Shai Gilgeous-Alexander scored 25 points but made just 5–18 field goals (he did go 15 of 17 from the free throw line); Jalen Williams scored 22 points and Chet Holmgren added 16, with both having 7 rebounds. Devin Booker scored 23 points for Phoenix, while Dillon Brooks and Jalen Green both shot the ball poorly, with both scoring 18 and 17 points, respectively.

ESPN

April 22
9:30 p.m. (8:30 p.m. CDT)

Recap

Phoenix Suns 107, Oklahoma City Thunder 120
Scoring by quarter: 29–30, 28–35, 20–35, 30–20
Pts: Dillon Brooks 30; Rebs: Royce O'Neale 9 Asts: Collin Gillespie 6	Pts: Shai Gilgeous-Alexander 37; Rebs: Isaiah Hartenstein 10; Asts: Shai Gilgeous-Alexander 9
Oklahoma City leads series, 2–0

Paycom Center, Oklahoma City, OK
Attendance: 18,203
Referees: James Williams, JB DeRosa, Jason Goldenberg

Following a tightly contested first quarter, the Thunder opened up a 26-point lead at the start of the fourth quarter, albeit losing Jalen Williams for the night due to a left hamstring injury. However, the Suns would rally back late in the fourth, cutting the deficit to 110–100 late in the game. Even so, Oklahoma City's lead was comfortable enough to hold the Phoenix off, and the latter never got a chance to cut the lead down to single digits. They were led by 30 points from Dillon Brooks on much improved efficiency, whereas Devin Booker contributed 22 points. Oklahoma City was led by the newly awarded Clutch Player of the Year Shai Gilgeous-Alexander, who finished with 37 points on much improved efficiency from Game 1. Jalen Green had 21 points on the night for the Suns but shot 1 of 8 from 3-point range and had 7 turnovers, as the Thunder took a comfortable 2–0 series lead with the series heading to Phoenix.

NBC/Peacock

April 25
3:30 p.m. (12:30 p.m. MST)

Recap

Oklahoma City Thunder 121, Phoenix Suns 109
Scoring by quarter: 33–28, 29–25, 25–26, 34–30
Pts: Shai Gilgeous-Alexander 42; Rebs: Chet Holmgren 7 Asts: Shai Gilgeous-Alexander 8	Pts: Dillon Brooks 33; Rebs: Collin Gillespie 10; Asts: Devin Booker 7
Oklahoma City leads series, 3–0

Mortgage Matchup Center, Phoenix, AZ
Attendance: 17,071
Referees: James Capers, Tyler Ford, Kevin Cutler

Shai Gilgeous-Alexander dominated, scoring 42 points on 15-for-18 shooting, as the Thunder moved to within a game of advancing to the Western Conference Semifinals. Dillon Brooks led the Suns with 33 points on 11-of-21 shooting while Jalen Green added 26. This was the Suns' ninth straight playoff loss.

Peacock/NBCSN

April 27
9:30 p.m. (6:30 p.m. MST)

Recap

Oklahoma City Thunder 131, Phoenix Suns 122
Scoring by quarter: 37–33, 38–34, 31–31, 25–24
Pts: Shai Gilgeous-Alexander 31; Rebs: Hartenstein, Holmgren 12 each Asts: Shai Gilgeous-Alexander 8	Pts: Devin Booker 24; Rebs: Oso Ighodaro 8 Asts: Devin Booker 6
Oklahoma City wins series, 4–0

Mortgage Matchup Center, Phoenix, AZ
Attendance: 17,071
Referees: Tony Brothers, Mitchell Ervin, Jacyn Goble

The Thunder capped off their third consecutive first round sweep in as many years with a 131–122 score in Phoenix. Oklahoma City, who was in control for the whole game, received another big performance from Shai Gilgeous-Alexander, as he scored 31 points on 10–17 shooting and had 8 assists. The front court duo of Chet Holmgren and Isaiah Hartenstein scored 24 and 18 points, respectively, with both hauling down 12 rebounds. Devin Booker, Dillon Brooks, Collin Gillespie and Jalen Green each had 20 or more points in the Suns' best offensive effort of the series, but they could not stop the Thunder on the other end, who shot 54 percent from the field and 50 percent from three. The defeat marked Phoenix's tenth straight playoff loss.

Regular-season series
Oklahoma City won 3–2 in the regular-season series

November 28, 2025

Recap

Phoenix Suns 119, Oklahoma City Thunder 123

Paycom Center, Oklahoma City, OK

December 10, 2025

Recap

Phoenix Suns 89, Oklahoma City Thunder 138

Paycom Center, Oklahoma City, OK

January 4, 2026

Recap

Oklahoma City Thunder 105, Phoenix Suns 108

Mortgage Matchup Center, Phoenix, AZ

February 11, 2026

Recap

Oklahoma City Thunder 136, Phoenix Suns 109

Mortgage Matchup Center, Phoenix, AZ

April 12, 2026

Recap

Phoenix Suns 135, Oklahoma City Thunder 103

Paycom Center, Oklahoma City, OK

This was the fifth playoff meeting between these two teams, with both teams winning two of the first four meetings. All four prior meetings took place when the Thunder played as the Seattle SuperSonics.

Previous playoff series
Tied 2–2 in all-time playoff series

1976

Seattle SuperSonics 2, Phoenix Suns 4

1976 Western Conference Semifinals

1979

Seattle SuperSonics 4, Phoenix Suns 3

1979 Western Conference Finals

1993

Phoenix Suns 4, Seattle SuperSonics 3

1993 Western Conference Finals

1997

Seattle SuperSonics 3, Phoenix Suns 2

1997 Western Conference First Round

==== (2) San Antonio Spurs vs. (7) Portland Trail Blazers ====
NBC/Peacock

April 19
9:00 p.m. (8:00 p.m. CDT)

Recap

Portland Trail Blazers 98, San Antonio Spurs 111
Scoring by quarter: 21–30, 28–29, 23–28, 26–24
Pts: Deni Avdija 30; Rebs: Deni Avdija 10; Asts: Jrue Holiday 11	Pts: Victor Wembanyama 35; Rebs: Castle, Johnson 7 each Asts: De'Aaron Fox 8
San Antonio leads series, 1–0

Frost Bank Center, San Antonio, TX
Attendance: 19,372
Referees: Josh Tiven, Courtney Kirkland, JB DeRosa

In the playoff debut of Spurs superstar Victor Wembanyama, San Antonio easily dispatched Portland, with Wembanyama setting a franchise record with 35 points in Game 1. Guards De'Aaron Fox and Stephon Castle each added 17 points for the Spurs, while posting a combined 15 assists. Deni Avdija led the way for the Trail Blazers, with 30 points and 10 rebounds. The San Antonio defense held Portland in check, with the Blazers shooting just 10-for-38 from three-point range while being out-rebounded 45 to 38.

NBC/Peacock

April 21
8:00 p.m. (7:00 p.m. CDT)

Recap

Portland Trail Blazers 106, San Antonio Spurs 103
Scoring by quarter: 27–28, 30–29, 22–23, 27–23
Pts: Scoot Henderson 31; Rebs: Donovan Clingan 10; Asts: Jrue Holiday 9	Pts: Stephon Castle 18; Rebs: Devin Vassell 12; Asts: Stephon Castle 5
Series tied, 1–1

Frost Bank Center, San Antonio, TX
Attendance: 19,338
Referees: John Goble, Curtis Blair, Brent Barnaky

Scoot Henderson scored 31 points and the Trail Blazers took advantage after an injury to Spurs star Victor Wembanyama forced him out early in the game to win a pivotal Game 2, thus tying the series at 1 apiece. Even without Wembanyama, the Spurs built up a 14-point lead early in the fourth quarter, but Portland defense stepped up, holding San Antonio without a field goal the final 3:37 of the game. Guards Stephon Castle and De'Aaron Fox led the Spurs with 18 and 17 points, respectively. Devin Vassell, who finished with 16 points and 12 rebounds, missed a 3-pointer with two seconds remaining that would have tied the game and sent it to overtime. After the game, it was revealed Wembanyama was diagnosed with a concussion.

Prime

April 24
10:30 p.m. (7:30 p.m. PDT)

Recap

San Antonio Spurs 120, Portland Trail Blazers 108
Scoring by quarter: 27–29, 32–36, 29–22, 32–21
Pts: Stephon Castle 33; Rebs: Harper, Kornet 10 each Asts: De'Aaron Fox 6	Pts: Jrue Holiday 29; Rebs: Donovan Clingan 11; Asts: Deni Avdija 9
San Antonio leads series, 2–1

Moda Center, Portland, OR
Attendance: 20,438
Referees: James Williams, Kevin Scott, Brian Forte

Entering Game 3 on the road without Victor Wembanyama, the Spurs faced a 15-point deficit in the second half before rallying to win 120–108 behind big time performances from sophomore Stephon Castle and Dylan Harper off the bench, as the two guards combined for 60 points. Castle finished with 33 points, whereas Harper scored a career-high 27 points off the bench, becoming the second youngest player to score 20-plus points in a playoff game off the bench, only behind an 18-year-old Kobe Bryant. Jrue Holiday led Portland with 29 points and 4 steals, and Scoot Henderson added 21. Most Improved Player finalist and first-time All-Star Deni Avdija went 12 of 16 from the free throw line but made just 3 of his 15 field goal attempts in his playoff home debut. The Spurs outscored the Blazers 61–43 in the second half, which included a 21–7 run in the third quarter to cut the deficit to 1 in the fourth quarter, before being able to pull away with the victory.

ESPN

April 26
3:30 p.m. (12:30 p.m. PDT)

Recap

San Antonio Spurs 114, Portland Trail Blazers 93
Scoring by quarter: 23–25, 18–33, 33–16, 40–19
Pts: De'Aaron Fox 28; Rebs: Victor Wembanyama 12; Asts: Stephon Castle 8	Pts: Deni Avdija 26; Rebs: Deni Avdija 7 Asts: Jrue Holiday 4
San Antonio leads series, 3–1

Moda Center, Portland, OR
Attendance: 19,717
Referees: Zach Zarba, Justin Van Duyne, Andy Nagy

San Antonio pulled off a 38-point turnaround, as they took a commanding 3–1 series lead in Game 4 in Portland. Victor Wembayana returned and had 27 points, 7 blocks and 11 rebounds (he was just the second player in the history of the NBA playoffs to accomplish this stat line following Shaquille O'Neal in 2004) in his first playoff road game and De'Aaron Fox scored 28 points on 11–17 shooting. Deni Avdija led the Trail Blazers with 26 points on 8-for-14 shooting; Jrue Holiday chipped in with 20 points and Jerami Grant had his best game thus far in the series with 17 points. The Spurs were the first team in NBA playoff history to trail by 15-plus at halftime and win the game by 15-plus.

ESPN

April 28
9:30 p.m. (8:30 p.m. CDT)

Recap

Portland Trail Blazers 95, San Antonio Spurs 114
Scoring by quarter: 24–36, 21–29, 20–21, 30–28
Pts: Deni Avdija 22; Rebs: Toumani Camara 8 Asts: Jrue Holiday 7	Pts: De'Aaron Fox 21; Rebs: Victor Wembanyama 14; Asts: De'Aaron Fox 9
San Antonio wins series, 4–1

Frost Bank Center, San Antonio, TX
Attendance: 19,063
Referees: Marc Davis, Nick Buchert, Ray Acosta

Guided by the veteran leadership of De'Aaron Fox, who scored 16 of his 21 points in the second half, the Spurs withstood a late Trail Blazers rally to win their first playoff series since 2017. Star center Victor Wembanyama took just seven shots but had 14 rebounds and 6 blocks. Julian Champagnie continued his sharpshooting going 5-for-7 from three-point range, while rookie Dylan Harper added 17 points off the bench on 6-for-9 shooting. Deni Avdija led the Blazers with 22 points but committed four turnovers.

Regular-season series
San Antonio won 2–1 in the regular-season series

November 26, 2025

Recap

San Antonio Spurs 115, Portland Trail Blazers 102

Moda Center, Portland, OR

January 3, 2026

Recap

Portland Trail Blazers 115, San Antonio Spurs 110

Frost Bank Center, San Antonio, TX

April 8, 2026

Recap

Portland Trail Blazers 101, San Antonio Spurs 112

Frost Bank Center, San Antonio, TX

This was the fifth playoff meeting between these two teams, with the Spurs winning three of the first four meetings.

Previous playoff series
San Antonio leads 3–1 in all-time playoff series

1990

Portland Trail Blazers 4, San Antonio Spurs 3

1990 Western Conference Semifinals

1993

Portland Trail Blazers 1, San Antonio Spurs 3

1993 Western Conference First Round

1999

San Antonio Spurs 4, Portland Trail Blazers 0

1999 Western Conference Finals

2014

San Antonio Spurs 4, Portland Trail Blazers 1

2014 Western Conference Semifinals

==== (3) Denver Nuggets vs. (6) Minnesota Timberwolves ====
Prime

April 18
3:30 p.m. (1:30 p.m. MDT)

Recap

Minnesota Timberwolves 105, Denver Nuggets 116
Scoring by quarter: 33–23, 29–39, 17–29, 26–25
Pts: Anthony Edwards 22; Rebs: Rudy Gobert 10; Asts: Anthony Edwards 7	Pts: Jamal Murray 30; Rebs: Nikola Jokić 13; Asts: Nikola Jokić 11
Denver leads series, 1–0

Ball Arena, Denver, CO
Attendance: 19,796
Referees: Zach Zarba, Jacyn Goble, Eric Dalen

Game 1 between the Nuggets and Timberwolves was a tale of two halves. The teams were tied at halftime after a competitive first half, but Denver pulled away in the third quarter, leading by as much as 15 points. While Minnesota pulled within two points, the Nuggets did not relinquish their lead. Jamal Murray led his team in scoring with 30 points (16 of which came from the free throw line). Nikola Jokić had a triple-double with 25 points, 13 rebounds and 11 assists. Aaron Gordon overcame three fouls in the first quarter to add 17 points and 8 rebounds. In the losing effort, Anthony Edwards finished with 22 points, 9 rebounds and 7 assists; Donte DiVincenzo scored 12 points on 4 3-pointers. Both teams struggled from beyond the arc, going a combined 21-for-70 (30 percent) on 3-pointers.

NBC/Peacock

April 20
10:30 p.m. (8:30 p.m. MDT)

Recap

Minnesota Timberwolves 119, Denver Nuggets 114
Scoring by quarter: 25–39, 39–25, 26–29, 29–21
Pts: Anthony Edwards 30; Rebs: Anthony Edwards 10; Asts: DiVincenzo, Randle 6 each	Pts: Jamal Murray 30; Rebs: Nikola Jokić 15; Asts: Nikola Jokić 8
Series tied, 1–1

Ball Arena, Denver, CO
Attendance: 19,692
Referees: Tony Brothers, Mitchell Ervin, Gediminas Petraitis

After a 14-point lead after the first quarter, the Timberwolves took a 39–22 run in the second quarter before Jamal Murray launched a half-court buzzer-beater to tie the score at halftime. Despite scoring just 2 points, Rudy Gobert made his presence felt in the fourth quarter, getting key stops on Murray and Nikola Jokić, while Donte DiVincenzo's late 3-pointer sealed the victory for Minnesota, as they tied the series at one apiece. Anthony Edwards led the team with 30 points and 10 rebounds despite a near-costly travel with 35 seconds remaining. Murray finished with 30 points, whereas Jokić finished with 24–15–8, although both stars struggled in the fourth quarter. Aside from Murray, Denver's starters combined to shoot 4 of 20 from 3-point range, contributing to the continuous shooting woes for the Nuggets.

Prime

April 23
9:30 p.m. (8:30 p.m. CDT)

Recap

Denver Nuggets 96, Minnesota Timberwolves 113
Scoring by quarter: 11–25, 28–36, 29–27, 28–25
Pts: Nikola Jokić 27; Rebs: Nikola Jokić 15; Asts: Jamal Murray 4	Pts: Ayo Dosunmu 25; Rebs: Rudy Gobert 12; Asts: Ayo Dosunmu 9
Minnesota leads series, 2–1

Target Center, Minneapolis, MN
Attendance: 18,978
Referees: Scott Foster, Justin Van Duyne, Sean Corbin

With an all-out defensive effort, the Timberwolves never trailed and led by as many as 27 points, as they won Game 3 by a score of 113–96. The first quarter saw the Nuggets record their third-fewest point total in a playoff quarter in team history: 11 points. They would be without Aaron Gordon, who was ruled out prior to the game due to a calf strain. Until the 10-minute mark of the second quarter, both teams shot a combined 2 of 21 (9.52 percent) on 3-pointers and finished a combined 17 of 66 at the end of the game. With a hampered Anthony Edwards, Ayo Dosunmu came off the bench and led the charge for Minnesota, scoring 25 points and dishing out 9 assists. Rudy Gobert was spectacular on the defensive end, holding three time MVP Nikola Jokić to a playoff-worst 7 of 26 shooting from the field, despite 27 points and 15 rebounds. Prior to his injury, Edwards finished with 17 points but reached 5 fouls at the point of the third quarter. Even though he went to the locker room initially, he returned but did not play the rest of the game, with the Timberwolves holding a lead that was safe enough to guide them to a 2–1 series lead.

ABC

April 25
8:30 p.m. (7:30 p.m. CDT)

Recap

Denver Nuggets 96, Minnesota Timberwolves 112
Scoring by quarter: 23–22, 31–28, 24–32, 18–30
Pts: Jamal Murray 30; Rebs: Nikola Jokić 15; Asts: Nikola Jokić 9	Pts: Ayo Dosunmu 43; Rebs: Rudy Gobert 15; Asts: Bones Hyland 7
Minnesota leads series, 3–1

Target Center, Minneapolis, MN
Attendance: 18,978
Referees: Marc Davis, Sean Wright, Pat Fraher

In the opening minutes of the first quarter, Donte DiVincenzo suffered an Achilles tendon rupture following an awkward landing, ending his season and playoff run. To make matters worse for Minnesota, Anthony Edwards suffered a hyperextended knee late in the second quarter and would not return. Denver took advantage of Edwards' absence, leading 54–50 at halftime. However, in what ABC announcer Mike Breen referred to as the "Ayo Dosunmu Game", Dosunmu came off the bench and scored 43 points, just the fourth time in NBA playoff history that a player ever scored 40-plus off the bench. He finished the night with spectacular efficiency, on 13-of-17 shooting from the field, and a perfect 5 of 5 from 3-point range and 12 of 12 from the free throw line. Including Dosunmu, the Timberwolves' bench outscored the Nuggets' a whopping 76–16, as the former forced 9 of the latter's 10 turnovers in the second half to swing the game in their favor. Jamal Murray led Denver with 30 points, whereas Nikola Jokić finished with 24 points, but shot 8 of 22 from the field and committed 4 turnovers despite a near triple-double. This would mark the Nuggets' third straight loss for just the second time all season.

With 1.2 seconds remaining, Jaden McDaniels ran down the court and scored a layup, after which Jokić physically attacked him for breaking an unwritten rule that the winning team should not score during the final seconds of a game when the outcome has already been decided. This immediately sparked an altercation between both teams' benches, resulting in Jokić and Julius Randle being ejected from the game.

The game, which originally aired on ABC, was moved to ESPN in the second half after live breaking news coverage of the 2026 White House Correspondents' Dinner shooting.

NBC/Peacock

April 27
10:30 p.m. (8:30 p.m. MDT)

Recap

Minnesota Timberwolves 113, Denver Nuggets 125
Scoring by quarter: 29–34, 22–26, 24–37, 38–28
Pts: Julius Randle 27; Rebs: Julius Randle 9 Asts: Anderson, Randle 6 each	Pts: Nikola Jokić 27; Rebs: Nikola Jokić 12; Asts: Nikola Jokić 16
Minnesota leads series, 3–2

Ball Arena, Denver, CO
Attendance: 19,907
Referees: James Capers, Tyler Ford, Brent Barnaky

Nikola Jokić had a triple-double and Spencer Jones provided a key spark, with the Nuggets staving off elimination in a 125–113 win at the Ball Arena. Jokić's full stat line was 27 points, 16 assists and 12 rebounds, good enough for his 23rd career triple-double. The Timberwolves, who are short-handed for the remainder of the series without Anthony Edwards and Donte DiVincenzo, trailed by as much as 27 points before cutting the margin to 10 in the fourth quarter. Julius Randle led Minnesota with 27 points and Ayo Dosunmu had 18. Naz Reid twisted his ankle but returned later in the game.

ESPN

April 30
9:30 p.m. (8:30 p.m. CDT)

Recap

Denver Nuggets 98, Minnesota Timberwolves 110
Scoring by quarter: 30–29, 20–28, 24–25, 24–28
Pts: Nikola Jokić 28; Rebs: Nikola Jokić 9 Asts: Nikola Jokić 10	Pts: Jaden McDaniels 32; Rebs: Rudy Gobert 13; Asts: Rudy Gobert 8
Minnesota wins series, 4–2

Target Center, Minneapolis, MN
Attendance: 18,978
Referees: Josh Tiven, Courtney Kirkland, JB DeRosa

The Timberwolves eliminated the Nuggets for the second time in three years with a Game 6 victory at home. With Ayo Dosunmu (calf soreness) joining Anthony Edwards and Donte DiVincenzo on the inactive list, Minnesota went big with Rudy Gobert, Julius Randle and Naz Reid fueling a 64–40 advantage in points in the paint and a 50–33 edge in rebounding. Jaden McDaniels led the Wolves with 32 points and 10 rebounds and Terrence Shannon Jr. scored 24 points in a rare start. Nikola Jokić had 28 points, 10 assists and nine rebounds to lead the Nuggets, but Jamal Murray struggled and finished with just 12 points on 4-for-17 shooting. Cameron Johnson scored 27 points for Denver.

Regular-season series
Denver won 3–1 in the regular-season series

October 27, 2025

Recap

Denver Nuggets 127, Minnesota Timberwolves 114

Target Center, Minneapolis, MN

November 15, 2025

Recap

Denver Nuggets 123, Minnesota Timberwolves 112

Target Center, Minneapolis, MN

December 25, 2025

Recap

Minnesota Timberwolves 138, Denver Nuggets 142 (OT)

Ball Arena, Denver, CO

March 1, 2026

Recap

Minnesota Timberwolves 117, Denver Nuggets 108

Ball Arena, Denver, CO

This was the fourth playoff meeting between these two teams, with the Timberwolves winning two of the first three meetings.

Previous playoff series
Minnesota leads 2–1 in all-time playoff series

2004

Minnesota Timberwolves 4, Denver Nuggets 1

2004 Western Conference First Round

2023

Denver Nuggets 4, Minnesota Timberwolves 1

2023 Western Conference First Round

2024

Denver Nuggets 3, Minnesota Timberwolves 4

2024 Western Conference Semifinals

==== (4) Los Angeles Lakers vs. (5) Houston Rockets ====
ABC

April 18
8:30 p.m. (5:30 p.m. PDT)

Recap

Houston Rockets 98, Los Angeles Lakers 107
Scoring by quarter: 29–33, 19–17, 18–25, 32–32
Pts: Alperen Şengün 19; Rebs: Jabari Smith Jr. 12; Asts: Reed Sheppard 8	Pts: Luke Kennard 27; Rebs: Deandre Ayton 11; Asts: LeBron James 13
LA Lakers lead series, 1–0

Crypto.com Arena, Los Angeles, CA
Attendance: 19,057
Referees: James Capers, Tyler Ford, Ed Malloy

In a game with stars Kevin Durant, Luka Dončić, and Austin Reaves all sidelined due to injury, the Lakers were able to win the short-handed duel 107–98, which marked their first Game 1 victory in the playoffs since the 2023 Western Conference Semifinals. Los Angeles never trailed since early in the 1st quarter, where LeBron James dished out eight assists in the quarter alone and ten in a half (both career highs), finishing with 13 on the night. Luke Kennard led the Lakers in scoring with 27 points, whereas Deandre Ayton notched a double-double. For Houston, Alperen Şengün led the team with 19 points but shot just 6 of 19 from the field. The entire Rockets team struggled shooting as a whole, on just 38 percent (35 of 93) from the field and 33 percent from 3-point range, while the Lakers' offense flourished, shooting 61 percent from the field and a remarkable 53 percent from three despite 18 turnovers.

NBC/Peacock

April 21
10:30 p.m. (7:30 p.m. PDT)

Recap

Houston Rockets 94, Los Angeles Lakers 101
Scoring by quarter: 26–33, 25–21, 17–21, 26–26
Pts: Kevin Durant 23; Rebs: Alperen Şengün 11; Asts: Amen Thompson 9	Pts: LeBron James 28; Rebs: LeBron James 8 Asts: James, Smart 7 each
LA Lakers lead series, 2–0

Crypto.com Arena, Los Angeles, CA
Attendance: 19,057
Referees: Josh Tiven, Courtney Kirkland, Justin Van Duyne

Kevin Durant's return from injury proved inconsequential for the Rockets as they once again experienced defeat. LeBron James led the way for the victorious Lakers with 28 points, 8 rebounds and 7 assists. Marcus Smart and Luke Kennard added 25 and 23 points, respectively. For Houston, Durant scored 23 points, while teammate Alperen Şengün logged a double-double with 20 points and 11 rebounds, along with 5 assists, 4 steals, and 2 blocks. As a team, the Lakers were 13-for-28 on 3-pointers overall, while the Rockets went 7-for-29.

Prime

April 24
8:00 p.m. (7:00 p.m. CDT)

Recap

Los Angeles Lakers 112, Houston Rockets 108 (OT)
Scoring by quarter: 39–32, 24–20, 17–23, 21–26, Overtime: 11–7
Pts: LeBron James 29; Rebs: LeBron James 13; Asts: Marcus Smart 10	Pts: Alperen Şengün 33; Rebs: Alperen Şengün 16; Asts: Reed Sheppard 7
LA Lakers lead series, 3–0

Toyota Center, Houston, TX
Attendance: 18,055
Referees: Zach Zarba, Ray Acosta, Tre Maddox

Prior to the game, it was announced that Kevin Durant would sit out his second game of the series after an ankle sprain suffered in Game 2. Even without Luka Dončić and Austin Reaves for the third straight game, the Lakers started hot with an 11-point lead at halftime, and at one point a 15-point lead in the 2nd half. Even so, the Rockets managed to claw their way back to take the lead, holding a 6-point advantage with 31 seconds remaining. However, after a costly foul on a 3-point shot by Jae'Sean Tate on Marcus Smart and a turnover which led to a game-tying 3-pointer by LeBron James near the end of regulation, the game went into overtime following a missed shot by Alperen Şengün and a 3-pointer by James that rimmed out. Los Angeles took control in overtime, becoming the first team in the playoffs to take a commanding 3–0 series lead, while Houston lost their 3rd consecutive game for just the 2nd time all season long. Despite eight turnovers, James led the Lakers with 29 points, 13 rebounds, and 6 assists, while Smart added 21 points and 10 assists. For the Rockets, Şengün scored a game-high 33 points and had 16 rebounds, whereas Amen Thompson had 26 points and 11 rebounds. However, the bench output was the difference maker between both teams, with Los Angeles' bench outscoring Houston's 24–3.

NBC/Peacock

April 26
9:30 p.m. (8:30 p.m. CDT)

Recap

Los Angeles Lakers 96, Houston Rockets 115
Scoring by quarter: 21–26, 26–30, 18–34, 31–25
Pts: Deandre Ayton 19; Rebs: Deandre Ayton 10; Asts: LeBron James 9	Pts: Amen Thompson 23; Rebs: Eason, Smith Jr. 8 each Asts: Amen Thompson 7
LA Lakers lead series, 3–1

Toyota Center, Houston, TX
Attendance: 18,055
Referees: James Williams, Kevin Scott, JB DeRosa

After a heartbreaking overtime loss in Game 3, the Rockets avoided a series sweep with a blowout win over the Lakers. Still in the absence of star player Kevin Durant, Amen Thompson led his team with 23 points. All of the Houston starters reached double-figures; Tari Eason scored 20, Alperen Şengün scored 19, Reed Sheppard scored 17, and Jabari Smith Jr. scored 16. Deandre Ayton led Los Angeles with 19 points and 10 rebounds but was ejected with over 5 minutes remaining in the third quarter due to a flagrant foul on Şengün. LeBron James was also held to 10 points throughout this game.

ESPN

April 29
10:00 p.m. (7:00 p.m. PDT)

Recap

Houston Rockets 99, Los Angeles Lakers 93
Scoring by quarter: 21–28, 30–19, 25–20, 23–26
Pts: Jabari Smith Jr. 22; Rebs: Alperen Şengün 9 Asts: Alperen Şengün 8	Pts: LeBron James 25; Rebs: Deandre Ayton 17; Asts: LeBron James 7
LA Lakers leads series, 3–2

Crypto.com Arena, Los Angeles, CA
Attendance: 19,057
Referees: Tony Brothers, Mitchell Ervin, Pat Fraher

A balanced team effort helped the Rockets continue their postseason, as they defeated the Lakers on the road. Each one of Houston's starters was in double figures in scoring, with Jabari Smith Jr. leading the way at 22 points. Austin Reaves played in his first game in nearly a month and scored 22 points but shot 4 of 16 from the field. He was involved in a crucial play late where he originally took a charge foul by Tari Eason, but the Rockets challenged the call, and the referees determined Reaves was not in legal guarding position, thus calling it a blocking foul instead. At that point, the Lakers were in a late surge to try to take advantage of another Houston collapse, similar to Game 3. However, Reed Sheppard hit a mid-range jump shot and stripped LeBron James of the ball in the final minutes to give the Rockets a comfortable lead. James scored 17 of his 25 points in the second half. He lost a closeout game at home for the first time since Game 5 of the first-round series against the Washington Wizards in 2008. Additionally, the Lakers held an all-time franchise record of 40–1 when leading a playoff series 3–1. Their only previous loss before this game in that situation came back in 2006 against the Phoenix Suns, losing three straight games after Kobe Bryant's overtime game-winner in Game 4.

Prime

May 1
9:30 p.m. (8:30 p.m. CDT)

Recap

Los Angeles Lakers 98, Houston Rockets 78
Scoring by quarter: 23–18, 26–13, 22–24, 27–23
Pts: LeBron James 28; Rebs: Deandre Ayton 16; Asts: LeBron James 8	Pts: Amen Thompson 18; Rebs: Jabari Smith Jr. 12; Asts: Smith Jr., Thompson 3 each
LA Lakers wins series, 4–2

Toyota Center, Houston, TX
Attendance: 18,055
Referees: Scott Foster, Curtis Blair, Karl Lane

The Lakers finished off the Rockets in Game 6 behind a 28-point effort from LeBron James. They used a dominant 27–3 run in parts of the first and second quarter to lead by 18 points at halftime. In the third quarter, they led by as much as 22 points. Rui Hachimura added 21 points with five 3-pointers and Deandre Ayton pulled down 16 rebounds. The Rockets shot poorly throughout the game, shooting just 35% from the field and making just 5-of-28 3-pointers; in particular, Reed Sheppard went 1-for-10 from three. This is the Lakers' first time advancing to the West Semifinals since 2023.

Regular-season series
LA Lakers won 2–1 in the regular-season series

December 25, 2025

Recap

Houston Rockets 119, Los Angeles Lakers 96

Crypto.com Arena, Los Angeles, CA

March 16, 2026

Recap

Los Angeles Lakers 100, Houston Rockets 92

Toyota Center, Houston, TX

March 18, 2026

Recap

Los Angeles Lakers 124, Houston Rockets 116

Toyota Center, Houston, TX

This was the tenth playoff meeting between these two teams, with the Lakers winning six of the first nine meetings.

Previous playoff series
LA Lakers leads 6–3 in all-time playoff series

1981

Los Angeles Lakers 1, Houston Rockets 2

1981 Western Conference First Round

1986

Los Angeles Lakers 1, Houston Rockets 4

1986 Western Conference Finals

1990

Los Angeles Lakers 3, Houston Rockets 1

1990 Western Conference First Round

1991

Los Angeles Lakers 3, Houston Rockets 0

1991 Western Conference First Round

1996

Los Angeles Lakers 1, Houston Rockets 3

1996 Western Conference First Round

1999

Los Angeles Lakers 3, Houston Rockets 1

1999 Western Conference Frst Round

2004

Los Angeles Lakers 4, Houston Rockets 1

2004 Western Conference First Round

2009

Los Angeles Lakers 4, Houston Rockets 3

2009 Western Conference Semifinals

2020

Los Angeles Lakers 4, Houston Rockets 1

2020 Western Conference Semifinals

== Conference semifinals ==
Note: Times are EDT (UTC−4) as listed by NBA. If the venue is located in a different time zone, the local time is also given.

=== Eastern Conference semifinals ===
==== (1) Detroit Pistons vs. (4) Cleveland Cavaliers ====
Peacock/NBCSN

May 5
7:00 p.m.

Recap

Cleveland Cavaliers 101, Detroit Pistons 111
Scoring by quarter: 21–37, 25–22, 30–24, 25–28
Pts: Donovan Mitchell 23; Rebs: Evan Mobley 9 Asts: James Harden 7	Pts: Cade Cunningham 23; Rebs: Jalen Duren 12; Asts: Cade Cunningham 7
Detroit leads series, 1–0

Little Caesars Arena, Detroit, MI
Attendance: 20,062
Referees: James Capers, Ben Taylor, JB DeRosa

With the Game 1 victory, Detroit ended a record-tying 12-game postseason losing streak against Cleveland, a drought that dated back to the 2007 Eastern Conference Finals. Cade Cunningham scored 23 points, Tobias Harris had 20, Duncan Robinson added 19 points on 5-of-8 from three, and Jalen Duren pulled down 12 rebounds. Donovan Mitchell led the Cavaliers in scoring with 23 points. Like in the first round against Toronto, James Harden struggled with turning the ball over with 7 in the game (the Cavs had 20 turnovers overall as a team), to go along with 22 points. Cleveland big man Jarrett Allen had just 2 points and 3 rebounds after a 22-point, 19-rebound performance in Game 7 of the first round against the Raptors.

Prime

May 7
7:00 p.m.

Recap

Cleveland Cavaliers 97, Detroit Pistons 107
Scoring by quarter: 18–25, 25–29, 32–25, 22–28
Pts: Donovan Mitchell 31; Rebs: Jarrett Allen 7 Asts: Dennis Schröder 5	Pts: Cade Cunningham 25; Rebs: Jalen Duren 10; Asts: Cade Cunningham 10
Detroit leads series, 2–0

Little Caesars Arena, Detroit, MI
Attendance: 20,062
Referees: Zach Zarba, Curtis Blair, Karl Lane

Cade Cunningham had 25 points and 10 assists and Tobias Harris scored 21 points, as the Pistons defended their home-court advantage to take a 2–0 series lead in Game 2. They have won five straight games since being down 3–1 to the Magic in the first round. Donovan Mitchell scored 31 points, leading the Cavaliers, and Jarrett Allen rebounded from his poor Game 1 with 22 points and 7 rebounds. However, James Harden struggled, missing 10-of-13 shots and committing four turnovers, including one that came when the Cavs were down six with 33 seconds. Thus far in the series, Harden has more turnovers (11) than field goal makes (10).

NBC/Peacock

May 9
3:00 p.m.

Recap

Detroit Pistons 109, Cleveland Cavaliers 116
Scoring by quarter: 30–32, 18–32, 33–19, 28–33
Pts: Cade Cunningham 27; Rebs: Cade Cunningham 10; Asts: Cade Cunningham 10	Pts: Donovan Mitchell 35; Rebs: Donovan Mitchell 10; Asts: James Harden 7
Detroit leads series, 2–1

Rocket Arena, Cleveland, OH
Attendance: 19,432
Referees: Scott Foster, Courtney Kirkland, Pat Fraher

The Cavaliers stayed perfect in the 2026 playoffs at home with a 116–109 win in Game 2. Donovan Mitchell scored 35 points on 13-of-24 shooting and 10 rebounds, and James Harden added 19 points on 8-of-14 shooting, which included multiple clutch baskets in the closing minutes of the game to seal the win. Cleveland blew a 17-point third quarter lead, but recovered in the fourth quarter, outscoring Detroit 33–28. Cade Cunningham led the Pistons with 27 points and 10 assists but had 8 turnovers. For the eighth consecutive game, Tobias Harris scored 20-points or more, as he finished with 21 points on 7-of-14 shooting.

NBC/Peacock

May 11
8:00 p.m.

Recap

Detroit Pistons 103, Cleveland Cavaliers 112
Scoring by quarter: 24–21, 32–31, 21–38, 26–22
Pts: Caris LeVert 24; Rebs: Tobias Harris 8 Asts: Cade Cunningham 6	Pts: Donovan Mitchell 43; Rebs: Evan Mobley 8 Asts: James Harden 11
Series tied, 2–2

Rocket Arena, Cleveland, OH
Attendance: 19,432
Referees: Marc Davis, Josh Tiven, Mitchell Ervin

The Cavaliers turned a four-point halftime deficit into a dominant victory behind a historic performance from Donovan Mitchell. Mitchell scored 39 of his 43 points in the second half and spearheaded a 24–0 run early in the second half. James Harden had a double-double of 24 points and 11 assists, while Evan Mobley had 17 points. Mitchell tied Sleepy Floyd (1987) for the most second half points scored in a playoff game. While neither starter on the Pistons side scored more than 20 points, Caris LeVert came off the bench and led with 24 points, while also holding off Cade Cunningham under 20 points for the first time this season.

ESPN

May 13
8:00 p.m.

Recap

Cleveland Cavaliers 117, Detroit Pistons 113 (OT)
Scoring by quarter: 27–29, 25–31, 32–20, 19–23, Overtime: 14–10
Pts: James Harden 30; Rebs: Jarrett Allen 10; Asts: Evan Mobley 8	Pts: Cade Cunningham 39; Rebs: Paul Reed 8 Asts: Cade Cunningham 9
Cleveland leads series, 3–2

Little Caesars Arena, Detroit, MI
Attendance: 20,062
Referees: Tony Brothers, Tyler Ford, Gediminas Petraitis

The Cavaliers stunned the Pistons to erase a 103–94 with two-plus minutes left, and win 117–113 in overtime, taking a 3–2 series lead back home. Detroit also led by 15-points at various moments in the first half, but they went cold at the end of the game, with Cleveland on a 13–0 run for a five-minute stretch in between the fourth quarter and overtime. James Harden led the Cavs with 30 points in his best playoff game with the team in his first season. There was some controversy at the end of regulation with the score tied when Jarrett Allen seemingly tripped Ausar Thompson on a scramble to a loose ball, but no call was made. Cade Cunningham had 39 points and 9 assists, but 6 turnovers. Detroit will look to improve to 4–0 thus far this playoffs in elimination games after winning three straight against the Orlando Magic in the first round.

Prime

May 15
7:00 p.m.

Recap

Detroit Pistons 115, Cleveland Cavaliers 94
Scoring by quarter: 27–25, 27–26, 30–19, 31–24
Pts: Cade Cunningham 21; Rebs: Jalen Duren 11; Asts: Cade Cunningham 8	Pts: James Harden 23; Rebs: Allen, Strus 8 each Asts: James Harden 4
Series tied, 3–3

Rocket Arena, Cleveland, OH
Attendance: 19,432
Referees: Zach Zarba, James Williams, Nick Buchert

The Pistons staved off elimination with a balanced effort in a 115–94 road win against the Cavaliers. Cade Cunningham led Detroit with 21 points, but had more of a struggle with his efficiency, only shooting 7-of-19 and turning the ball over 7 times. He was picked up by his teammates such as Jalen Duren, who broke out of his slump this playoffs, with 15 points and 11 rebounds. Daniss Jenkins also had 15 points, and Paul Reed chipped in with 17 while Duncan Robinson had 14 off the bench. Ausar Thompson was effective on both sides of the ball with 10 points, 9 rebounds, and 4 steals. For Cleveland, Donovan Mitchell scored 18 points on 6-of-20 shooting while being guarded mostly by Thompson. James Harden had 23 points, but for much of the playoffs so far, struggled holding on to the ball, as he had 8 turnovers. This is the Cavaliers' and Pistons' second Game 7 this playoffs, as both played in one in the first round. Cleveland lost their first home game of this playoffs, falling to 6–1.

Prime

May 17
8:00 p.m.

Recap

Cleveland Cavaliers 125, Detroit Pistons 94
Scoring by quarter: 31–22, 33–25, 35–26, 26–21
Pts: Donovan Mitchell 26; Rebs: Evan Mobley 12; Asts: Donovan Mitchell 8	Pts: Daniss Jenkins 17; Rebs: Jalen Duren 9 Asts: Cunningham, Jenkins 5 each
Cleveland wins series, 4–3

Little Caesars Arena, Detroit, MI
Attendance: 20,062
Referees: Marc Davis, Ben Taylor, Kevin Scott

Entering the game, the Pistons were 4–0 when facing elimination this postseason, while the Cavaliers have posted a road record of 1–5.

Cleveland completed the upset over top-seeded Detroit with a dominant 31-point victory. The Cavaliers reached their first Eastern Conference Finals appearance without LeBron James on the roster since 1992, and first overall since 2018. In their 6 previous appearances, they were 5–1, including four consecutive finals wins from 2015–2018, with their only loss in 2009 to the Orlando Magic. With the win, star guard Donovan Mitchell, who had 26 points and 8 rebounds in the game, made his first conference finals in his ninth season. This was the Pistons' first Game 7 loss at home, going 5–0 in their previous such games.

Regular-season series
Tied 2–2 in the regular-season series

October 27, 2025

Recap

Cleveland Cavaliers 116, Detroit Pistons 95

Little Caesars Arena, Detroit, MI

January 4, 2026

Recap

Detroit Pistons 114, Cleveland Cavaliers 110

Rocket Arena, Cleveland, OH

February 27, 2026

Recap

Cleveland Cavaliers 119, Detroit Pistons 122 (OT)

Little Caesars Arena, Detroit, MI

March 3, 2026

Recap

Detroit Pistons 109, Cleveland Cavaliers 113

Rocket Arena, Cleveland, OH

This was the fifth playoff meeting between these two teams, with the Cavaliers winning three of the first four meetings.

Previous playoff series
Cleveland leads 3–1 in all-time playoff series

2006

Detroit Pistons 4, Cleveland Cavaliers 3

2006 Eastern Conference Semifinals

2007

Detroit Pistons 2, Cleveland Cavaliers 4

2007 Eastern Conference Finals

2009

Cleveland Cavaliers 4, Detroit Pistons 0

2009 Eastern Conference First Round

2016

Cleveland Cavaliers 4, Detroit Pistons 0

2016 Eastern Conference First Round

==== (3) New York Knicks vs. (7) Philadelphia 76ers ====
NBC/Peacock

May 4
8:00 p.m.

Recap

Philadelphia 76ers 98, New York Knicks 137
Scoring by quarter: 25–33, 26–41, 27–35, 20–28
Pts: Paul George 17; Rebs: Kelly Oubre Jr. 5 Asts: Quentin Grimes 4	Pts: Jalen Brunson 35; Rebs: Ariel Hukporti 9 Asts: Hart, Towns 6 each
New York leads series, 1–0

Madison Square Garden, New York, NY
Attendance: 19,812
Referees: Scott Foster, Courtney Kirkland, Kevin Cutler

The Knicks decimated the 76ers in Game 1, as Jalen Brunson scored 27 of his 35 points in the 1st half to give New York a 23-point halftime lead. The game was never close since the 1st quarter, with New York outscoring Philadelphia 104–73 since. With this victory, it marked the first time in NBA history a playoff team had won 3 consecutive playoff games by 25 points or more, with the Knicks having won their games by 29, 51 and 39 points respectively, nearly 40 points on average. In the 76ers' first playoff road loss since Game 1 against the Boston Celtics in round one, Paul George led the team with 17 points, with Joel Embiid and Tyrese Maxey shooting a combined 6 of 20 from the field, despite both finishing in double figures. Backup center Adem Bona notably recorded 5 fouls and 3 turnovers in 4 minutes of play, going scoreless in this span.

ESPN

May 6
7:00 p.m.

Recap

Philadelphia 76ers 102, New York Knicks 108
Scoring by quarter: 33–31, 29–30, 28–28, 12–19
Pts: Tyrese Maxey 26; Rebs: Andre Drummond 8 Asts: Tyrese Maxey 6	Pts: Jalen Brunson 26; Rebs: Karl-Anthony Towns 10; Asts: Karl-Anthony Towns 7
New York leads series, 2–0

Madison Square Garden, New York, NY
Attendance: 19,812
Referees: Tony Brothers, Tyler Ford, Brian Forte

The Knicks won a hard-fought Game 2 to take a commanding 2–0 series lead. The contest featured 25 lead changes, which was the most in a playoff game in 11 years, and 14 ties. Neither the 76ers nor Knicks led by more than seven points the entire 60 minutes. Prior to the game Joel Embiid was ruled out with a right hip and ankle injury. Guard Tyrese Maxey stepped up scoring 26 points for Philadelphia, but was matched by Jalen Brunson, who also scored 26, and made multiple clutch baskets down the stretch for New York. OG Anunoby added 24 points and Karl-Anthony Towns had 20 points, 10 rebounds and 7 assists. Anunoby left the game late, seemingly with a hamstring injury, and did not return. Due to the absence of star Embiid, Maxey and Paul George played 46 and 42 minutes, respectively, and struggled shooting the ball in the fourth quarter.

Prime

May 8
7:00 p.m.

Recap

New York Knicks 108, Philadelphia 76ers 94
Scoring by quarter: 27–31, 33–21, 25–24, 23–18
Pts: Jalen Brunson 33; Rebs: Karl-Anthony Towns 12; Asts: Jalen Brunson 9	Pts: Kelly Oubre Jr. 22; Rebs: Kelly Oubre Jr. 8 Asts: Tyrese Maxey 7
New York leads series, 3–0

Xfinity Mobile Arena, Philadelphia, PA
Attendance: 19,746
Referees: Marc Davis, Josh Tiven, Ray Acosta

After an early 12-point lead for Philadelphia, New York slowly clawed their way back into the game and captured the lead in the second quarter, never seizing it and taking a 3–0 series lead, which also marked their sixth straight playoff victory, and seventh consecutive victory at Xfinity Mobile Arena dating back to the 2024 NBA playoffs. Despite OG Anunoby being ruled out for the game due to a hamstring injury, the Knicks never wavered in his absence, with Jalen Brunson having a spectacular performance once again, finishing with 33 points, 5 rebounds and 9 assists, and Mikal Bridges added 23 points in a dominant win for New York. The 76ers were out-rebounded 49–33 despite a rough shooting night from beyond the arc for the Knicks (33%, 9–27), with Tyrese Maxey playing 44 minutes but only scoring 17 points, and Paul George finished with all 15 of his points in the first quarter, going 0–9 since.

ABC

May 10
3:30 p.m.

Recap

New York Knicks 144, Philadelphia 76ers 114
Scoring by quarter: 43–24, 38–33, 41–26, 22–31
Pts: Miles McBride 25; Rebs: Josh Hart 9 Asts: Karl-Anthony Towns 10	Pts: Joel Embiid 24; Rebs: V. J. Edgecombe 6 Asts: V. J. Edgecombe 7
New York wins series, 4–0

Xfinity Mobile Arena, Philadelphia, PA
Attendance: 19,746
Referees: John Goble, Sean Wright, Nick Buchert

In a dominant effort, the Knicks completed just the third ever playoff series sweep in franchise history in emphatic fashion, while clinching their second straight Eastern Conference Finals berth. Miles McBride started off the game 4 of 4 from 3-point range, ultimately finishing with 25 points and 7 made 3-pointers, a team high for New York. In the opening quarter, the Knicks made 11 3-pointers and built up a 19-point lead at the end of the quarter, with the former being an NBA playoff record. They ultimately tied the NBA playoff record for most 3-pointers made in a playoff game with 25, while taking their 2nd 30-plus point victory over Philadelphia in the series, and extended their postseason winning streak to 7 games. This also marked the 8th straight win for the Knicks over the 76ers at Xfinity Mobile Arena. In a "home game" for the Knicks due to the massive number of New York fans, cheers heard from Philadelphia fans were extremely limited, and a dismal team performance facing a sweep did not make things any better. Joel Embiid scored 24 points on 8 of 8 shooting from the field, but his teammates failed to deliver, with Paul George, V. J. Edgecombe and Tyrese Maxey scoring a combined 32 points on 13 of 37 shooting. In addition, the Knicks dominated the glass 47–30, with New York having more defensive rebounds (32) than Philadelphia had collectively as a team (30).

Regular-season series
Tied 2–2 in the regular-season series

December 19, 2025

Recap

Philadelphia 76ers 116, New York Knicks 107

Madison Square Garden, New York, NY

January 3, 2026

Recap

Philadelphia 76ers 130, New York Knicks 119

Madison Square Garden, New York, NY

January 24, 2026

Recap

New York Knicks 112, Philadelphia 76ers 109

Xfinity Mobile Arena, Philadelphia, PA

February 11, 2026

Recap

New York Knicks 138, Philadelphia 76ers 89

Xfinity Mobile Arena, Philadelphia, PA

This was the eleventh playoff meeting between these two teams, and the sixth since the Syracuse Nationals relocated to Philadelphia in 1963, with the 76ers winning six of the first ten meetings.

Previous playoff series
Philadelphia leads 6–4 in all-time playoff series

1950

Syracuse Nationals 2, New York Knicks 1

1950 Eastern Division Finals

1951

New York Knicks 3, Syracuse Nationals 2

1951 Eastern Division Finals

1952

Syracuse Nationals 1, New York Knicks 3

1952 Eastern Division Finals

1954

New York Knicks 0, Syracuse Nationals 2

1954 Eastern Division Round Robin Semifinals

1959

New York Knicks 0, Syracuse Nationals 2

1959 Eastern Division Semifinals

1968

Philadelphia 76ers 4, New York Knicks 2

1968 Eastern Division Semifinals

1978

Philadelphia 76ers 4, New York Knicks 0

1978 Eastern Conference Semifinals

1983

Philadelphia 76ers 4, New York Knicks 0

1983 Eastern Conference Semifinals

1989

New York Knicks 3, Philadelphia 76ers 0

1989 Eastern Conference First Round

2024

New York Knicks 4, Philadelphia 76ers 2

2024 Eastern Conference First Round

=== Western Conference semifinals ===
==== (1) Oklahoma City Thunder vs. (4) Los Angeles Lakers ====
NBC/Peacock

May 5
8:30 p.m. (7:30 p.m. CDT)

Recap

Los Angeles Lakers 90, Oklahoma City Thunder 108
Scoring by quarter: 26–31, 27–30, 19–23, 18–24
Pts: LeBron James 27; Rebs: Deandre Ayton 12; Asts: Marcus Smart 7	Pts: Chet Holmgren 24; Rebs: Chet Holmgren 12; Asts: Shai Gilgeous-Alexander 6
Oklahoma City leads series, 1–0

Paycom Center, Oklahoma City, OK
Attendance: 18,203
Referees: Zach Zarba, James Williams, Nick Buchert

Chet Holmgren led the way with 24 points and 12 rebounds, as the Thunder stayed undefeated in the 2026 postseason in Game 1. The Lakers stayed close for most of the game, but Oklahoma City pulled ahead by double-digits thanks to an end of the third quarter surge. Playing the #1 defense in the league, Los Angeles struggled without Luka Dončić, shooting 41% from the field and 33% from three. Most notably, Austin Reaves was 3-of-16 and scored just 8 points, which was the fewest makes ever by a Lakers' player in the playoffs with 15 or more shot attempts.

Prime

May 7
9:30 p.m. (8:30 p.m. CDT)

Recap

Los Angeles Lakers 107, Oklahoma City Thunder 125
Scoring by quarter: 23–27, 35–30, 22–36, 27–32
Pts: Austin Reaves 31; Rebs: Deandre Ayton 10; Asts: James, Reaves 6 each	Pts: Gilgeous-Alexander, Holmgren 22 each Rebs: Hartenstein, Holmgren 9 each Asts: Ajay Mitchell 6
Oklahoma City leads series, 2–0

Paycom Center, Oklahoma City, OK
Attendance: 18,203
Referees: John Goble, Ben Taylor, Mark Lindsay

With star Shai Gilgeous-Alexander in foul trouble early, Chet Holmgren (22 points), Ajay Mitchell (20), and Jared McCain (18 points, 4-of-5 from three) stepped up as the Thunder took a 2–0 series with a 125–107 win in Game 2. Gilgeous-Alexander still tied Holmgren to lead his team in scoring but picked up four fouls early in the third quarter and was double-teamed all game, forcing open looks for his teammates. The game was similar to Game 1, in that the Lakers stuck with the Thunder for much of the game (even leading by five in the third quarter), until Oklahoma City surged ahead and never surrendered the lead from the middle of the third quarter onwards. Austin Reaves had his best game thus far in the playoffs, leading Los Angeles with a playoff-career-high 31 points, though he had 5 turnovers against 6 assists. LeBron James added 23 and Rui Hachimura had 16. The game was chippy throughout, leading to a small confrontation between Reaves and referee John Goble after the game and prompting head coach JJ Redick to criticize the officials in the post-game press conference.

ABC

May 9
8:30 p.m. (5:30 p.m. PDT)

Recap

Oklahoma City Thunder 131, Los Angeles Lakers 108
Scoring by quarter: 31–25, 26–34, 33–20, 41–29
Pts: Ajay Mitchell 24; Rebs: Hartenstein, Holmgren 9 each Asts: Ajay Mitchell 10	Pts: Rui Hachimura 21; Rebs: Adou Thiero 8 Asts: Austin Reaves 9
Oklahoma City leads series, 3–0

Crypto.com Arena, Los Angeles, CA
Attendance: 19,057
Referees: James Capers, Curtis Blair, Ed Malloy

Ajay Mitchell continued to stellar series in place of injured forward Jalen Williams, scoring a playoff career-high 24 points and dishing out 10 assists, as the Thunder took a commanding 3–0 series lead in Game 3 in Los Angeles. Shai Gilgeous-Alexander added 23 points and 9 assists and Chet Holmgren scored 18 points and had 9 rebounds for Oklahoma City, who moved to 7–0 in the playoffs. Game 3 was similar to the first two games as Los Angeles made it a game for a half. However, the Thunder outscored the Lakers in the third quarter 33–20 and continued with a 41-point fourth quarter. LeBron James and Austin Reaves combined to shoot 12 for 32 from the field. Rui Hachimura led the Lakers with 21 points.

Prime

May 11
10:30 p.m. (7:30 p.m. PDT)

Recap

Oklahoma City Thunder 115, Los Angeles Lakers 110
Scoring by quarter: 21–26, 28–19, 31–39, 35–26
Pts: Shai Gilgeous-Alexander 35; Rebs: Isaiah Hartenstein 10; Asts: Shai Gilgeous-Alexander 8	Pts: Austin Reaves 27; Rebs: LeBron James 12; Asts: Austin Reaves 6
Oklahoma City wins series, 4–0

Crypto.com Arena, Los Angeles, CA
Attendance: 19,057
Referees: Tony Brothers, Kevin Scott, Justin Van Duyne

The Thunder capped off their undefeated record versus the Lakers in both the regular season and the playoffs with a 115–110 win to advanced to their second straight Conference Finals. Los Angeles trailed by 4 points at halftime and led by 4 points entering the 4th quarter. However, they were outscored 26–35 in the final quarter. Chet Holmgren made a go-ahead dunk to break the 110–110 tie with 32.5 seconds remaining. Oklahoma City were led by Shai Gilgeous-Alexander who scored 35 points. Ajay Mitchell scored a playoff career-high 28 points, 10 of which were in the 4th quarter. In a losing effort, Austin Reaves scored 27 points but missed a game-tying three-pointer in the closing seconds as the Lakers were swept out of the playoffs for the first time since the 2023 Western Conference Finals against the eventual champion Denver Nuggets. Rui Hachimura scored 25 points, including a key four-point play in the closing minutes, and LeBron James had 24 points and 12 rebounds.

With the win, the Thunder, remaining undefeated, became the fourth defending champion to start the playoffs 8–0, as well as the first since the 2017 Cleveland Cavaliers. They were also the first defending champion since the 2019 Golden State Warriors (who eventually lost to the Toronto Raptors in the NBA Finals) to advance to the conference finals.

Regular-season series
Oklahoma City won 4–0 in the regular-season series

November 12, 2025

Recap

Los Angeles Lakers 92, Oklahoma City Thunder 121

Paycom Center, Oklahoma City, OK

February 9, 2026

Recap

Oklahoma City Thunder 119, Los Angeles Lakers 110

Crypto.com Arena, Los Angeles, CA

April 2, 2026

Recap

Los Angeles Lakers 96, Oklahoma City Thunder 139

Paycom Center, Oklahoma City, OK

April 7, 2026

Recap

Oklahoma City Thunder 123, Los Angeles Lakers 87

Crypto.com Arena, Los Angeles, CA

This was the tenth playoff meeting between these two teams, with the Lakers winning six of the first nine meetings. The first seven meetings took place when the Thunder played as the Seattle SuperSonics.

Previous playoff series
Los Angeles leads 6–3 in all-time playoff series

1978

Seattle SuperSonics 2, Los Angeles Lakers 1

1978 Western Conference First Round

1979

Seattle SuperSonics 4, Los Angeles Lakers 1

1979 Western Conference Semifinals

1980

Los Angeles Lakers 4, Seattle SuperSonics 1

1980 Western Conference Finals

1987

Los Angeles Lakers 4, Seattle SuperSonics 0

1987 Western Conference Finals

1989

Los Angeles Lakers 4, Seattle SuperSonics 0

1989 Western Conference Semifinals

1995

Seattle SuperSonics 1, Los Angeles Lakers 3

1995 Western Conference First Round

1998

Seattle SuperSonics 1, Los Angeles Lakers 4

1998 Western Conference Semifinals

2010

Los Angeles Lakers 4, Oklahoma City Thunder 2

2010 Western Conference First Round

2012

Oklahoma City Thunder 4, Los Angeles Lakers 1

2012 Western Conference Semifinals

==== (2) San Antonio Spurs vs. (6) Minnesota Timberwolves ====
Peacock/NBCSN

May 4
9:30 p.m. (8:30 p.m. CDT)

Recap

Minnesota Timberwolves 104, San Antonio Spurs 102
Scoring by quarter: 24–23, 21–22, 24–27, 35–30
Pts: Julius Randle 21; Rebs: Gobert, Randle 10 each Asts: Mike Conley 6	Pts: Dylan Harper 18; Rebs: Victor Wembanyama 15; Asts: De'Aaron Fox 6
Minnesota leads series, 1–0

Frost Bank Center, San Antonio, TX
Attendance: 18,827
Referees: Marc Davis, Kevin Scott, Gediminas Petraitis

Victor Wembanyama set a new NBA playoff record for blocks in a single game (12), finishing with 11 points and 15 rebounds. However, he struggled on the offensive end, going 5 of 17 from the field and alongside De'Aaron Fox; both stars shot a combined 0 of 12 from 3-point range. Minnesota built up a late 9-point lead, led by Julius Randle and Anthony Edwards, with the latter coming off the bench in his return from an injury in the previous round. The Spurs staged a late rally to cut the Timberwolves' 9-point advantage to 2, but Julian Champagnie's potential game-winning 3-pointer fell short at the rim, as the Wolves stole Game 1 and took a 1–0 series lead. Randle was the only player to reach over 20 points for the game, despite 12 other players finishing in double figures.

ESPN

May 6
9:30 p.m. (8:30 p.m. CDT)

Recap

Minnesota Timberwolves 95, San Antonio Spurs 133
Scoring by quarter: 17–24, 18–35, 28–39, 32–35
Pts: Edwards, McDaniels, Randle, Shannon Jr. 12 each Rebs: Rudy Gobert 10; Asts: Anderson, McDaniels 4 each	Pts: Stephon Castle 21; Rebs: Victor Wembanyama 15; Asts: Dylan Harper 5
Series tied, 1–1

Frost Bank Center, San Antonio, TX
Attendance: 19,185
Referees: Scott Foster, Sean Wright, Mitchell Ervin

San Antonio routed Minnesota, 133–95, to even the series at 1 apiece. After a close 1st quarter, the Spurs took a 24-point halftime lead and maintained control from there, with each of their starters scoring in double figures, including Stephon Castle's 21 points and Victor Wembanyama's 19 points and 15 rebounds. No Timberwolves player eclipsed 12 points, in an all-out defensive effort by San Antonio. This was their largest playoff loss in franchise history.

Prime

May 8
9:30 p.m. (8:30 p.m. CDT)

Recap

San Antonio Spurs 115, Minnesota Timberwolves 108
Scoring by quarter: 23–22, 28–29, 35–28, 29–29
Pts: Victor Wembanyama 39; Rebs: Victor Wembanyama 15; Asts: Stephon Castle 12	Pts: Anthony Edwards 32; Rebs: Anthony Edwards 14; Asts: Anthony Edwards 6
San Antonio leads series, 2–1

Target Center, Minneapolis, MN
Attendance: 18,978
Referees: Tony Brothers, Tyler Ford, Jacyn Goble

In just his second road playoff game, Victor Wembanyama took the spotlight with 39 points, 15 rebounds and 5 blocks, becoming only the fourth NBA player to achieve this feat in the playoffs. The Spurs began the game on a 14–1 run, seemingly taking early control before the Timberwolves made a late rally to keep it a close game, with the score being tied at halftime. After San Antonio took a 7-point lead headed into the fourth quarter, Minnesota made multiple comeback attempts but fell short each time, as the Spurs ended an 8-game losing streak at Target Center and took a 2–1 series lead. Anthony Edwards started the game coming off his knee injury, getting back into form with 32 points, 14 rebounds and 6 assists, but no other Timberwolves player reached over 20 points, as Jaden McDaniels and Julius Randle combined to shoot 8 of 34 from the field.

NBC/Peacock

May 10
7:30 p.m. (6:30 p.m. CDT)

Recap

San Antonio Spurs 109, Minnesota Timberwolves 114
Scoring by quarter: 30–34, 26–26, 28–20, 25–34
Pts: Fox, Harper 24 each Rebs: Luke Kornet 9 Asts: Stephon Castle 4	Pts: Anthony Edwards 36; Rebs: Rudy Gobert 13; Asts: Gobert, Reid 4 each
Series tied, 2–2

Target Center, Minneapolis, MN
Attendance: 18,978
Referees: Zach Zarba, James Williams, Brent Barnaky

Behind Anthony Edwards' 36 points (16 in the fourth quarter), the Timberwolves avoided a 3–1 deficit and rallied past the Spurs to tie the series 2–2. Neither team led by double digits. After Victor Wembanyama got ejected in the second quarter due to a flagrant foul 2 on Naz Reid, San Antonio took an 8-point lead entering the fourth quarter, but could not help but struggle against the surging Edwards. De'Aaron Fox and Dylan Harper each scored 24 points in a losing effort.

NBC/Peacock

May 12
8:00 p.m. (7:00 p.m. CDT)

Recap

Minnesota Timberwolves 97, San Antonio Spurs 126
Scoring by quarter: 30–34, 17–25, 26–32, 24–35
Pts: Anthony Edwards 20; Rebs: Julius Randle 10; Asts: Dosunmu, Shannon Jr. 4 each	Pts: Victor Wembanyama 27; Rebs: Victor Wembanyama 17; Asts: Stephon Castle 6
San Antonio leads series, 3–2

Frost Bank Center, San Antonio, TX
Attendance: 19,345
Referees: John Goble, Ben Taylor, Karl Lane

Victor Wembanyama returned with fury, finishing with 27 points (18 in the first quarter), 17 rebounds and five assists, to help push the Spurs pass the Timberwolves and take a 3–2 series lead. Keldon Johnson added 21 points, the best game in the playoffs thus far for the Sixth Man of the Year, while De'Aaron Fox scored 18 and Stephon Castle had 17. Minnesota made it a game in the third quarter, but each time they would get within striking distance, San Antonio answered with rallies themselves.

Prime

May 15
9:30 p.m. (8:30 p.m. CDT)

Recap

San Antonio Spurs 139, Minnesota Timberwolves 109
Scoring by quarter: 36–27, 38–34, 36–23, 29–25
Pts: Stephon Castle 32; Rebs: Stephon Castle 11; Asts: De'Aaron Fox 9	Pts: Anthony Edwards 24; Rebs: Randle, Reid 7 each Asts: Ayo Dosunmu 9
San Antonio wins series, 4–2

Target Center, Minneapolis, MN
Attendance: 18,978
Referees: James Capers, Josh Tiven, Justin Van Duyne

In a closeout game on the road, the Spurs never flinched and took a dominant 139–109 victory over the Timberwolves to advance to the Western Conference Finals for the first time since the 2016–17 season, and their second conference finals appearance since Tim Duncan's retirement. Stephon Castle led the way for San Antonio, finishing with 32 points on 11-for-16 shooting from the field and 5 of 7 from 3-point range, whereas De'Aaron Fox added 21 points and 9 assists. The Spurs set the tone early with a 29-point lead, as they never trailed throughout the game and led by as many as 37; despite a Minnesota rally late in the second quarter that cut the initial 29-point advantage to 12, San Antonio held off any other answer and put the game away in the second half. Despite committing only five turnovers, the Timberwolves were out-rebounded 60–29 and shot only 38% from the field, with their starters shooting a combined 18 of 59 from the field (30.5%). Notably, Julius Randle recorded just three points in a disastrous showing, while Rudy Gobert finished the game scoreless. Conversely, every San Antonio starter finished the game in double figures with a total of 101 points, just 8 points removed from Minnesota's entire game total.

This was the third straight Timberwolves season that ended in a non-competitive blowout. They trailed by 33 points at halftime in a 30-point loss at Oklahoma City in the Game 5 of the Western Conference finals last year and were down by 29 points at halftime to Dallas in the Western Conference finals in 2024 in a 21-point loss in Game 5. The Timberwolves also lost a second round series for the first time in franchise history.

Regular-season series
Minnesota won 2–1 in the regular-season series

November 30, 2025

Recap

San Antonio Spurs 112, Minnesota Timberwolves 125

Target Center, Minneapolis, MN

January 11, 2026

Recap

San Antonio Spurs 103, Minnesota Timberwolves 104

Target Center, Minneapolis, MN

January 17, 2026

Recap

Minnesota Timberwolves 123, San Antonio Spurs 126

Frost Bank Center, San Antonio, TX

This was the third playoff meeting between these two teams, with the Spurs winning both previous meetings.

Previous playoff series
San Antonio leads 2–0 in all-time playoff series

1999

San Antonio Spurs 3, Minnesota Timberwolves 1

1999 Western Conference First Round

2001

San Antonio Spurs 3, Minnesota Timberwolves 1

2001 Western Conference First Round

== Conference finals ==
Note: Times are EDT (UTC−4) as listed by NBA. If the venue is located in a different time zone, the local time is also given.

=== Eastern Conference finals ===
==== (3) New York Knicks vs. (4) Cleveland Cavaliers ====
ESPN

May 19
8:00 p.m.

Recap

Cleveland Cavaliers 104, New York Knicks 115 (OT)
Scoring by quarter: 16–23, 32–23, 35–23, 18–32, Overtime: 3–14
Pts: Donovan Mitchell 29; Rebs: Evan Mobley 14; Asts: Dennis Schröder 5	Pts: Jalen Brunson 38; Rebs: Karl-Anthony Towns 13; Asts: Jalen Brunson 6
New York leads series, 1–0

Madison Square Garden, New York, NY
Attendance: 19,812
Referees: Scott Foster, James Capers, JB DeRosa

Nearly five months after a come-from-behind victory at Madison Square Garden on Christmas Day, the Knicks orchestrated another comeback win over the Cavaliers, spoiling Donovan Mitchell's Conference Finals debut. Cleveland built a 22-point lead in the fourth quarter, but New York outscored them 30–8 to finish regulation. Sam Merrill missed a game-winning three-pointer, sending the game to overtime.

Landry Shamet, who came on strong down the stretch after Knicks coach Mike Brown benched Josh Hart in favor of him, scored the game-tying three-pointer to force overtime. Jalen Brunson led all New York scorers with 38 points, 17 of them in the fourth quarter and overtime. In a losing effort, Mitchell led Cleveland with 29 points, and Evan Mobley had a double-double with 15 points and 14 rebounds. James Harden, playing in his first Conference Finals since 2018, had 15 points, but was 1–8 on three-pointers and had 6 turnovers. He was also hunted on the defense, as Brunson scored 11 consecutive baskets during their comeback, with Harden as the primary defender. According to ESPN, the Cavaliers had a 99.9% chance of winning with 7:49 left in the fourth quarter. Since that point, the Knicks outscored them 44–11. Their 22-point fourth quarter comeback after trailing 93–71 was the second-largest in NBA playoff history, after the Los Angeles Clippers in Game 1 of their first round series against the Memphis Grizzlies, and the largest in Knicks franchise history. New York's winning streak for this playoffs was extended to eight games, dating back to Game 4 of the first-round series over the Atlanta Hawks.

ESPN

May 21
8:00 p.m.

Recap

Cleveland Cavaliers 93, New York Knicks 109
Scoring by quarter: 27–24, 22–29, 21–32, 23–24
Pts: Donovan Mitchell 26; Rebs: Jarrett Allen 10; Asts: Mobley, Schröder, Strus, Wade 3 each	Pts: Josh Hart 26; Rebs: Karl-Anthony Towns 13; Asts: Jalen Brunson 14
New York leads series, 2–0

Madison Square Garden, New York, NY
Attendance: 19,812
Referees: Zach Zarba, James Williams, Sean Wright

The Knicks cruised to a 109–93 victory to take a 2–0 series lead over the Cavaliers. Josh Hart scored a playoff career-high 26 points and backcourt teammate Jalen Brunson had 19 points and 14 assists. Mikal Bridges added 19 points and Karl-Anthony Towns had 18 points and 13 rebounds for New York in a balanced team effort. Donovan Mitchell led Cleveland with 26 points. This was the Knicks' ninth straight win.

ABC

May 23
8:00 p.m.

Recap

New York Knicks 121, Cleveland Cavaliers 108
Scoring by quarter: 37–27, 23–27, 31–28, 30–26
Pts: Jalen Brunson 30; Rebs: Josh Hart 9 Asts: Karl-Anthony Towns 7	Pts: Evan Mobley 24; Rebs: Allen, Strus 7 each Asts: Max Strus 6
New York leads series, 3–0

Rocket Arena, Cleveland, OH
Attendance: 19,432
Referees: Tony Brothers, Tyler Ford, Gediminas Petraitis

The Knicks continued their offensive groove in the playoffs, winning their 11th playoff game in 33 days and extending their postseason winning streak to 10 games. The Cavaliers, who entered Game 3 with a 6–1 record at home, never led in the game and lost 3 consecutive games for the first time since December 2025. Jalen Brunson recorded 30 points, the fifth time this postseason he had eclipsed 30 points or more, while Mikal Bridges continued his spectacular performance on both ends of the floor, finishing with 22 points on 11–15 shooting, while collecting 3 steals and 2 blocks. Landry Shamet came off the bench and went 4–5 from beyond the arc, including 3 big shots in the 4th quarter to hold off Cleveland from making a rally. Donovan Mitchell, James Harden and Evan Mobley combined for 66 points but shot a collective 5–23 from 3-point range and had 16 of 17 Cavaliers turnovers, most of them occurring in the third quarter. With this victory, the Knicks are now just one win away from advancing to the NBA Finals, looking to clinch their first appearance since 1999.

ESPN

May 25
8:00 p.m.

Recap

New York Knicks 130, Cleveland Cavaliers 93
Scoring by quarter: 38–26, 30–23, 30–22, 32–22
Pts: Karl-Anthony Towns 19; Rebs: Karl-Anthony Towns 14; Asts: Josh Hart 6	Pts: Donovan Mitchell 31; Rebs: Evan Mobley 7 Asts: Evan Mobley 4
New York wins series, 4–0

Rocket Arena, Cleveland, OH
Attendance: 19,432
Referees: Marc Davis, Josh Tiven, Kevin Scott

The Knicks finished their dominant Eastern Conference playoff run with a 130–93 win over the Cavaliers to punch their ticket to the NBA Finals for the first time since 1999. They joined the 2017 Warriors, 2001 Lakers, 1999 Spurs, and 1989 Lakers as the only teams to win 11 consecutive games in a single-postseason. Starting with their Game 5 win against the Atlanta Hawks in Round 1, the Knicks have played the most dominant 10-game stretch in NBA history (regular season or playoffs), with a plus-206 point differential. With the loss, despite making it to the Conference Finals, the Cavs finished their playoff run with an 8–10 record.

Regular-season series
New York won 2–1 in the regular-season series

October 22, 2025

Recap

Cleveland Cavaliers 111, New York Knicks 119

Madison Square Garden, New York, NY

December 25, 2025

Recap

Cleveland Cavaliers 124, New York Knicks 126

Madison Square Garden, New York, NY

February 24, 2026

Recap

New York Knicks 94, Cleveland Cavaliers 109

Rocket Arena, Cleveland, OH

This was the fifth playoff meeting between these two teams, with the Knicks winning all of the first four meetings.

Previous playoff series
New York leads 4–0 in all-time playoff series

1978

Cleveland Cavaliers 0, New York Knicks 2

1978 Eastern Conference First Round

1995

New York Knicks 3, Cleveland Cavaliers 1

1995 Eastern Conference First Round

1996

Cleveland Cavaliers 0, New York Knicks 3

1996 Eastern Conference First Round

2023

Cleveland Cavaliers 1, New York Knicks 4

2023 Eastern Conference First Round

=== Western Conference finals ===
==== (1) Oklahoma City Thunder vs. (2) San Antonio Spurs ====
NBC/Peacock

May 18
8:30 p.m. (7:30 p.m. CDT)

Recap

San Antonio Spurs 122, Oklahoma City Thunder 115 (2OT)
Scoring by quarter: 27–27, 24–17, 29–29, 21–28, Overtime: 7–7, 14–7
Pts: Victor Wembanyama 41; Rebs: Victor Wembanyama 24; Asts: Stephon Castle 11	Pts: Alex Caruso 31; Rebs: Chet Holmgren 8 Asts: Shai Gilgeous-Alexander 12
San Antonio leads series, 1–0

Paycom Center, Oklahoma City, OK
Attendance: 18,203
Referees: Zach Zarba, John Goble, Mitchell Ervin

Victor Wembanyama propelled the Spurs to a thrilling double-overtime victory over the Thunder on the road, posting 41 points and 24 rebounds. He was the youngest player to record at least 40 points and 20 rebounds in a playoff game. Alex Caruso scored 31 points, one short of his career-high of 32 in 2019. Shai Gilgeous-Alexander, who was recently named the NBA MVP for the second straight year, finished with a double-double of 24 points and 12 assists. De'Aaron Fox (ankle) did not play, while Jalen Williams returned from a 6-game absence and contributed to 26 points. Chet Holmgren blocked a potential Wembanyama game winner at the end of regulation to force overtime.

This was Oklahoma City's third double-overtime game of the season (including the playoffs), after their first two games against the Houston Rockets and the Indiana Pacers, respectively, both of which ended in a Thunder win. The Thunder's nine-game postseason winning streak dating back to Game 7 of the 2025 NBA Finals came to an end.

NBC/Peacock

May 20
8:30 p.m. (7:30 p.m. CDT)

Recap

San Antonio Spurs 113, Oklahoma City Thunder 122
Scoring by quarter: 31–31, 20–31, 37–34, 25–26
Pts: Stephon Castle 25; Rebs: Victor Wembanyama 17; Asts: Stephon Castle 8	Pts: Shai Gilgeous-Alexander 30; Rebs: Isaiah Hartenstein 13; Asts: Shai Gilgeous-Alexander 9
Series tied, 1–1

Paycom Center, Oklahoma City, OK
Attendance: 18,203
Referees: Tony Brothers, Josh Tiven, Karl Lane

Behind a 30-point, 9-assist performance from MVP Shai Gilgeous-Alexander, the Thunder evened up the series at 1 apiece with another tightly contested game against the Spurs. Isaiah Hartenstein scored just 10 points, but had 13 rebounds, including 8 offensive, and Alex Caruso added 17 off the bench, as the team lost forward Jalen Williams in the first half due to a recurring hamstring strain. San Antonio were without All-Star De'Aaron Fox and rookie Dylan Harper themselves, the latter of whom came out of the game after an awkward fall in the third quarter. Stephon Castle led the Spurs with 25 points but had primary point guard duties with Fox and Harper out, and turned the ball over nine times, now committing 20 turnovers in the first two games. San Antonio received 22 points from Devin Vassell and Victor Wembanyama had 21 points, 17 rebounds, 6 assists, 4 blocks after his historic Game 1 performance.

NBC/Peacock

May 22
8:30 p.m. (7:30 p.m. CDT)

Recap

Oklahoma City Thunder 123, San Antonio Spurs 108
Scoring by quarter: 26–31, 32–20, 37–33, 28–24
Pts: Shai Gilgeous-Alexander 26; Rebs: Isaiah Hartenstein 8 Asts: Shai Gilgeous-Alexander 12	Pts: Victor Wembanyama 26; Rebs: Fox, Vassell 7 each Asts: Stephon Castle 7
Oklahoma City leads series, 2–1

Frost Bank Center, San Antonio, TX
Attendance: 19,034
Referees: Marc Davis, Courtney Kirkland, Justin Van Duyne

26 points from Shai Gilgeous-Alexander and 76 bench points from the Thunder was more than enough for Oklahoma City to take a 2–1 series lead in a 123–108 Game 3 win in San Antonio. The bench was led by Jared McCain 24 points in 27 minutes. Backup big man Jaylin Williams added 18 points on five three-point shots and Alex Caruso added 15 on three 3-pointers. The Spurs, who started 15–0 to begin the game, had De'Aaron Fox and Dylan Harper activated for the game, but their shot from the field (43 percent) was worse than the Thunder's three-point shot rate (45 percent). Victor Wembanyama had 24 points but had just 4 rebounds and was outrebounded by Isaiah Hartenstein. Devin Vassell added 20 points and Fox scored 15 in his first game of the series.

NBC/Peacock

May 24
8:00 p.m. (7:00 p.m. CDT)

Recap

Oklahoma City Thunder 82, San Antonio Spurs 103
Scoring by quarter: 19–28, 19–22, 22–28, 22–25
Pts: Shai Gilgeous-Alexander 19; Rebs: Chet Holmgren 9 Asts: Shai Gilgeous-Alexander 7	Pts: Victor Wembanyama 33; Rebs: De'Aaron Fox 10; Asts: Stephon Castle 6
Series tied, 2–2

Frost Bank Center, San Antonio, TX
Attendance: 19,405
Referees: Scott Foster, Curtis Blair, Nick Buchert

Playing with a sense of urgency to avoid going down 3–1 in the series, the Spurs held the Thunder to their second-lowest postseason total, beating them 103–82 in Game 4. Victor Wembanyama had another effective all-around effort with 33 points (including a half-court shot as the clock expired before halftime), 8 rebounds, 5 assists and 3 blocks. Oklahoma City's bench was still effective, scoring 34 points, but well below their historic 76 points in Game 3. Overall for the team, it was a struggle as they shot just 33 percent and 18 percent from 3-point range, to go with 17 turnovers against 22 assists.

NBC/Peacock

May 26
8:30 p.m. (7:30 p.m. CDT)

Recap

San Antonio Spurs 114, Oklahoma City Thunder 127
Scoring by quarter: 27–29, 31–40, 33–32, 23–26
Pts: Stephon Castle 24; Rebs: Julian Champagnie 8 Asts: De'Aaron Fox 8	Pts: Shai Gilgeous-Alexander 32; Rebs: Isaiah Hartenstein 15; Asts: Shai Gilgeous-Alexander 9
Oklahoma City leads series, 3–2

Paycom Center, Oklahoma City, OK
Attendance: 18,203
Referees: Tony Brothers, James Capers, Sean Wright

The Oklahoma City offense returned in Game 5 with a pivotal 127–114 win to go ahead in the series 3–2. The Thunder, who were held to 82 points in a Game 4 loss two days earlier, had 82 points less than four minutes into the third quarter. Shai Gilgeous-Alexander had 32 points on 16–17 shooting from the free throw line. Alex Caruso led the bench with another big performance with 22 points and 4-for-8 from the 3 point line. Isaiah Hartenstein led the team in plus-minus (plus-24) with a double-double effort of 12 points on 6–8 shooting and 15 rebounds, while his backcourt teammate Chet Holmgren had his best game of the series with 16 points on 6–9 shooting and 11 rebounds. Stephon Castle scored 24 points for San Antonio, who got 22 points from Julian Champagnie and 20 from Victor Wembanyama — who was held to 4-of-15 shooting in his worst game of the series. The Spurs missed 29 of their 41 3-point tries. There was 70 free-throws attempted in the game. Postgame, the referees were a topic of discussion for the game and series, who after letting the two teams play in Game 1, have called the series tight since. Many also accused the Thunder, specifically NBA's MVP Gilgeous-Alexander, of flopping.

NBC/Peacock

May 28
8:30 p.m. (7:30 p.m. CDT)

Recap

Oklahoma City Thunder 91, San Antonio Spurs 118
Scoring by quarter: 22–35, 31–25, 13–32, 25–26
Pts: Shai Gilgeous-Alexander 15; Rebs: Chet Holmgren 11; Asts: Jared McCain 6	Pts: Victor Wembanyama 28; Rebs: Victor Wembanyama 10; Asts: Stephon Castle 9
Series tied, 3–3

Frost Bank Center, San Antonio, TX
Attendance: 19,066
Referees: Zach Zarba, James Williams, Tyler Ford

The Spurs forced the 160th Game 7 in NBA history and the first in the Western Conference Finals since 2018, with a 118–91 rout in Game 6. Victor Wembanyama led the charge with 28 points, 10 rebounds and three blocks, while rookie Dylan Harper scored 18 points off the bench and Stephon Castle finished with 17 points and 9 assists. San Antonio effectively iced the game in the third quarter with a 20–0 run. Shai Gilgeous-Alexander was limited to 15 points on 6-for-18 shooting. Jalen Williams returned for Oklahoma City but had just one point in a 10-minute role off the bench.

Game 7 was the Spurs' first since losing to the Denver Nuggets in the first round of the 2019 playoffs; no players on the 2019 team are still on San Antonio's active roster. The last time the Thunder played in a Game 7, they clinched the NBA championship last season.

NBC/Peacock

May 30
8:00 p.m. (7:00 p.m. CDT)

Recap

San Antonio Spurs 111, Oklahoma City Thunder 103
Scoring by quarter: 32–25, 24–28, 24–24, 31–26
Pts: Victor Wembanyama 22; Rebs: Harper, Wembanyama 7 each Asts: Stephon Castle 6	Pts: Shai Gilgeous-Alexander 35; Rebs: Jaylin Williams 10; Asts: Shai Gilgeous-Alexander 9
San Antonio wins series, 4–3

Paycom Center, Oklahoma City, OK
Attendance: 18,203
Referees: Marc Davis, John Goble, Josh Tiven

Before the game, it was announced that Jalen Williams (hamstring) and Ajay Mitchell (right soleus) would not play.

The Spurs dethroned the defending champion Thunder in a 111–103 victory to advance to their first NBA Finals since 2014. The score was Spurs 80, Thunder 77 entering the fourth quarter, as the game was a back-and-forth contest where the Spurs led by as many as 14 in the first half and then by as many as 11 in the third, only to see the Thunder come roaring back both times. The Spurs pulled ahead by 12 again in midway through the fourth, but the Thunder stormed back again. There were many huge plays in the game, but perhaps the biggest came midway through the fourth during a Thunder momentum swing run, when San Antonio’s back-up big Luke Kornet blocked Isaiah Hartenstein at the rim, denying a fast-break score that would have gotten the Thunder within four.

Despite foul trouble in the fourth, Victor Wembanyama scored 22 points and had 7 rebounds in 42 minutes played. Julian Champagnie got 18 of his 20 off of 3-pointers and Stephon Castle had a 16 points, 6 rebounds, and 6 assists (against 6 turnovers). De'Aaron Fox chipped in with 15 points and rookie guard Dylan Harper had 12 points and 7 rebounds. Shai Gilgeous-Alexander had his best game of the series, scoring 35 points on 12–21 shooting and 9 assists. But he received little help outside of Cason Wallace's 17 points on 6–10 shooting. All-NBA Third Team forward/center Chet Holmgren had just 4 points and only took two shots, making his 4 points the second-lowest scoring output by an All-NBA player in a Game 7 in NBA history.

Over the course of the season, San Antonio gave Oklahoma City eight of their 22 losses. The Thunder finished the regular season 64–18 and the playoffs 11–4, or 75–22 overall, going 1–4 against the Spurs in the regular season and 3–4 against the Spurs in the playoffs, while going 63–14 in the regular season and 8–0 in the playoffs against the rest of the league, or 71–14 overall against the rest of the league versus a record of 4–8 overall against the Spurs.

Regular-season series
San Antonio won 4–1 in the regular-season series

December 13, 2025

Recap

San Antonio Spurs 111, Oklahoma City Thunder 109

T-Mobile Arena, Las Vegas, NV

December 23, 2025

Recap

Oklahoma City Thunder 110, San Antonio Spurs 130

Frost Bank Center, San Antonio, TX

December 25, 2025

Recap

San Antonio Spurs 117, Oklahoma City Thunder 102

Paycom Center, Oklahoma City, OK

January 13, 2026

Recap

San Antonio Spurs 98, Oklahoma City Thunder 119

Paycom Center, Oklahoma City, OK

February 4, 2026

Recap

Oklahoma City Thunder 106, San Antonio Spurs 116

Frost Bank Center, San Antonio, TX

This was the seventh playoff meeting between these two teams, with the Spurs winning four of the first six meetings. The first three meetings took place when the Thunder played as the Seattle SuperSonics.

Previous playoff series
San Antonio leads 4–2 in all-time playoff series

1982

San Antonio Spurs 4, Seattle SuperSonics 1

1982 Western Conference Semifinals

2002

San Antonio Spurs 3, Seattle SuperSonics 2

2002 Western Conference First Round

2005

San Antonio Spurs 4, Seattle SuperSonics 2

2005 Western Conference Semifinals

2012

San Antonio Spurs 2, Oklahoma City Thunder 4

2012 Western Conference Finals

2014

San Antonio Spurs 4, Oklahoma City Thunder 2

2014 Western Conference Finals

2016

San Antonio Spurs 2, Oklahoma City Thunder 4

2016 Western Conference Semifinals

== NBA Finals: (W2) San Antonio Spurs vs. (E3) New York Knicks ==
Note: Times are EDT (UTC−4) as listed by NBA. If the venue is located in a different time zone, the local time is also given.

ABC

June 3
8:30 p.m. (7:30 p.m. CDT)

Recap

New York Knicks 105, San Antonio Spurs 95
Scoring by quarter: 19–27, 29–28, 28–21, 29–19
Pts: Jalen Brunson 30; Rebs: Josh Hart 15; Asts: Josh Hart 6	Pts: Victor Wembanyama 26; Rebs: Victor Wembanyama 12; Asts: De'Aaron Fox 5
New York leads series, 1–0

Frost Bank Center, San Antonio, TX
Attendance: 18,835
Referees: Scott Foster, James Capers, Sean Wright

ABC

June 5
8:30 p.m. (7:30 p.m. CDT)

Recap

New York Knicks 105, San Antonio Spurs 104
Scoring by quarter: 25–34, 31–18, 28–23, 21–29
Pts: Karl-Anthony Towns 21; Rebs: Karl-Anthony Towns 13; Asts: Bridges, Brunson 6 each	Pts: Victor Wembanyama 29; Rebs: Vassell, Wembanyama 9 each Asts: Fox, Vassell 5 each
New York leads series, 2–0

Frost Bank Center, San Antonio, TX
Attendance: 19,014
Referees: Tony Brothers, Josh Tiven, Tyler Ford

ABC

June 8
8:30 p.m.

Recap

San Antonio Spurs 115, New York Knicks 111
Scoring by quarter: 33–22, 24–42, 35–27, 23–20
Pts: Victor Wembanyama 32; Rebs: Dylan Harper 9 Asts: De'Aaron Fox 8	Pts: Jalen Brunson 32; Rebs: Josh Hart 9 Asts: Brunson, Hart 5 each
New York leads series, 2–1

Madison Square Garden, New York, NY
Attendance: 19,812
Referees: Marc Davis, John Goble, Curtis Blair

ABC

June 10
8:30 p.m.

Recap

San Antonio Spurs 106, New York Knicks 107
Scoring by quarter: 41–22, 35–27, 14–26, 16–32
Pts: Victor Wembanyama 24; Rebs: Victor Wembanyama 13; Asts: De'Aaron Fox 7	Pts: Jalen Brunson 36; Rebs: Karl-Anthony Towns 10; Asts: Jalen Brunson 7
New York leads series, 3–1

Madison Square Garden, New York, NY
Attendance: 19,812
Referees: Zach Zarba, James Williams, Courtney Kirkland

ABC

June 13
8:30 p.m. (7:30 p.m. CDT)

Recap

New York Knicks 94, San Antonio Spurs 90
Scoring by quarter: 13–23, 24–19, 28–30, 29–18
Pts: Jalen Brunson 45; Rebs: Josh Hart 11; Asts: Mikal Bridges 4	Pts: Dylan Harper 25; Rebs: Victor Wembanyama 14; Asts: De'Aaron Fox 5
New York wins series, 4–1

Frost Bank Center, San Antonio, Texas
Attendance: 18,984
Referees: Scott Foster, James Capers, Tyler Ford

Regular-season series
Tied 1–1 in the regular-season series (Note: The 2025 NBA Cup championship, which New York won 124–113, does not count in the regular season standings.)

December 31, 2025

Recap

New York Knicks 132, San Antonio Spurs 134

Frost Bank Center, San Antonio, TX

March 1, 2026

Recap

San Antonio Spurs 89, New York Knicks 114

Madison Square Garden, New York, NY

This was the second playoff meeting between these two teams, with the Spurs winning the previous meeting in the 1999 NBA Finals.

Previous playoff series
San Antonio leads 1–0 in all-time playoff series

1999

San Antonio Spurs 4, New York Knicks 1

1999 NBA Finals

== Statistical leaders ==
Category	Game high			Average			
Category	Player	Team	High	Player	Team	Avg.	GP
Points	Cade Cunningham; Paolo Banchero; Jalen Brunson	Detroit Pistons; Orlando Magic; New York Knicks	45	Jalen Brunson	New York Knicks	28.4	19
Rebounds	Victor Wembanyama	San Antonio Spurs	24	Nikola Jokić	Denver Nuggets	13.2	6
Assists	Nikola Jokić	Denver Nuggets	16	Nikola Jokić	Denver Nuggets	9.5	6
Steals	Dylan Harper	San Antonio Spurs	7	Franz Wagner	Orlando Magic	2.8	4
Blocks	Victor Wembanyama	San Antonio Spurs	12	Victor Wembanyama	San Antonio Spurs	3.5	22

== Media coverage ==
This was the first postseason of new 11-year U.S. media deals with the ESPN family of networks, NBC Sports and Amazon Prime Video. These deals marked the first time that all first-round playoff games in the U.S. were exclusive national games, and regional broadcasters could no longer produce their own local feeds. The agreement with Prime Video also resulted in this year being the first time that selected playoffs games would only be available in the U.S on a streaming service.

ESPN and ABC had approximately 18 games in the first two rounds, with those games also streaming on ESPN DTC. NBC Sports produced at least 15 games in the first round, and at least seven games in the second round; at least seven first round and four second round games aired over-the-air on NBC, with the remaining games on Peacock and NBCSN. Peacock also simulcast all games that air on the main NBC broadcast network. Amazon Prime Video streamed at least nine first-round playoff games and at least five second-round playoff games.

During the first two rounds, Saturday afternoon games were split among Prime Video and NBC Sports. The rest of the first week generally resembled coverage during the regular season with ABC airing games on Saturday nights and Sunday afternoons, NBC Sports producing games on Sunday through Tuesday nights, ESPN on Wednesdays, and Prime Video on Thursdays and Fridays. The broadcasting assignments of the second week were then adjusted to ensure each broadcaster met their required number of games in the round. Game 7 of the Cleveland Cavaliers–Detroit Pistons conference semifinal was thus assigned to Prime Video, marking the first time an NBA Game 7 was only available in the U.S on a streaming service.

As per the alternating rotation, NBC and Peacock had the Western Conference Finals this season, while ABC and ESPN had the Eastern Conference Finals. ABC will have the NBA Finals for the 24th straight year, along with it also being streamed on ESPN DTC.

In Canada, the home market of the Toronto Raptors, English national broadcast rights were split approximately equally between the Sportsnet and TSN groups of channels. Under those rights, the two broadcasters were allowed to produce separate Canadian feeds for all games involving the Raptors regardless of round or U.S. broadcaster. Sportsnet and TSN simulcast the U.S.-based feed for all other series.

All games airing on Sportsnet are also simulcast on Sportsnet+.

Awful Announcing criticized NBC Sports' decision during both the Monday and Tuesday of first week of the conference semifinals to have overlapping games at 8 and 9:30 p.m. ET, with one on over-the-air NBC and the other on NBCSN (with both available on Peacock), instead of the standard weeknight doubleheaders at 7 and 9:30 p.m. ET, when on May 4 (Monday), Game 1 of the Philadelphia 76ers–New York Knicks series on NBC became a 137–98 Knicks blowout while Game 1 of the Minnesota Timberwolves–San Antonio Spurs series on NBCSN ended with a 104–102 Timberwolves win at the buzzer.

=== Viewership ===
Playoff viewership during the first round on April 26 indicated it was their highest since 1993, with an average of 3.84 million viewers per game across ESPN, ABC, NBC, Peacock and Prime Video. The increase in national viewership was attributed to the elimination of first-round regional broadcasts, as well as over-the-air broadcaster NBC taking over a portion of the coverage that was previously held by cable channel TNT.

Game 7 of Spurs–Thunder Western Conference Finals (15.9 million viewers) on NBC was the highest rated non-NBA Finals playoff game since the Thunder–Warriors on TNT in 2016 (16.0 million).

The NBA Finals was the most-watched since 1998, with an average of 20.6 million viewers.

Most viewed playoff games
Rank	Round	Date	Game	Away team	Score	Home team	Network	Viewers (millions)
1	NBA Finals	June 13	Game 5	Knicks	94–90	Spurs	ABC	24.5
2	NBA Finals	June 8	Game 3	Spurs	115–111	Knicks	ABC	23.8
3	NBA Finals	June 10	Game 4	Spurs	106–107	Knicks	ABC	20.9
4	NBA Finals	June 3	Game 1	Knicks	105–95	Spurs	ABC	16.9
5	NBA Finals	June 5	Game 2	Knicks	105–104	Spurs	ABC	16.4
6	Western Conference Finals	May 30	Game 7	Spurs	111–103	Thunder	NBC	15.9
7	Western Conference Finals	May 28	Game 6	Thunder	91–118	Spurs	NBC	11.6
8	Eastern Conference First Round	May 2	Game 7	76ers	109–100	Celtics	NBC	10.99
9	Western Conference Finals	May 24	Game 4	Thunder	82–103	Spurs	NBC	10.4
10	Western Conference Finals	May 26	Game 5	Spurs	114–127	Thunder	NBC	10.3

== Sponsorship ==
For the fifth straight year, the playoffs is officially known as the "2026 NBA Playoffs presented by Google". During the expanded sponsorship agreement with Google where it expanded the sponsorship from the "Google Pixel" brand in favor of the general Google branding, this sponsorship provides the logo branding inside the venues and in official digital properties on-court, as well as commercial inventory during ESPN, ABC, NBC and Amazon Prime Video telecasts of the playoff games. In Canada, the NBA Playoffs are presented by MyRocky, a Canadian telehealth partner. NewPath Sports & Entertainment Inc. secured the Canadian rights.
