= 2025 NBA playoffs =

Professional basketball tournament

Tournament details
- Dates: April 19 – June 22, 2025
- Season: 2024–25
- Teams: 16

Final positions
- Champions: Oklahoma City Thunder (2nd title)
- Runners-up: Indiana Pacers
- Semifinalists: Minnesota Timberwolves; New York Knicks

Tournament statistics
- Scoring leader(s): Shai Gilgeous-Alexander (Thunder) (29.9 PPG)

Awards
- MVP: Shai Gilgeous-Alexander (Thunder)

The 2025 NBA playoffs was the postseason tournament of the National Basketball Association's (NBA) 2024–25 season. The Oklahoma City Thunder, led by the reigning MVP and scoring leader Shai Gilgeous-Alexander, finished the season with a league-best 68–14 record, giving them the first seed in the Western Conference. The Eastern Conference's best record was held by the Cleveland Cavaliers, who finished with a 64–18 record under their star Donovan Mitchell. Both teams, along with the Boston Celtics who entered the postseason as the defending champions, were seen as the championship contenders.

The reigning runner-up Dallas Mavericks lost to the Memphis Grizzlies in the play-in tournament, while the Celtics unexpectedly lost to their rival New York Knicks with star guard Jalen Brunson in six games. The Knicks advanced to the conference finals for the first time in 25 years, but lost to the Tyrese Haliburton-led Indiana Pacers in another upset after six games, as the latter defeated both the Milwaukee Bucks and Cavaliers in five games, with the Bucks eliminated in the first round for the third consecutive year. The Pacers advanced to the Finals for the first time since 2000.

In the Western Conference, the Lakers lost in the first round to the Minnesota Timberwolves, in which star guard Luka Dončić appeared in his first playoff series with the Lakers since his unexpected trade from the Mavericks earlier that year. The Thunder swept the Grizzlies and defeated the Nikola Jokić-led Denver Nuggets on their way to the Western Conference finals, defeating the Timberwolves in five games and advancing to the NBA Finals for the first time since 2012. With the Thunder and Pacers competing against each other in the Finals, the NBA saw its seventh consecutive unique champion, the longest streak in history.

The Thunder, who had won 18 more games than the Pacers, were heavily favored in the 2025 NBA Finals, but the series went to a decisive game seven, the first in the Finals since 2016. The Thunder won the game 103–91 after Haliburton tore his Achilles tendon in the first quarter. Gilgeous-Alexander was named Finals MVP after averaging 30 points per game during the playoffs. The Thunder's championship was their first since 1979, when they were known as the Seattle SuperSonics. The Pacers' postseason run, which included five 15-point comebacks and four game-tying or game-winning shots by Haliburton, is considered one of the most surprising in NBA history.

== Overview ==
=== Updates to postseason appearances ===
- The Oklahoma City Thunder entered the playoffs with the best record in the Western Conference for the second consecutive season and also finished with their best regular-season record in franchise history. They also won the Maurice Podoloff Trophy for clinching the best record in the NBA for the first time in franchise history.
- The Cleveland Cavaliers entered the playoffs for the third consecutive season and also clinched the number one seed in the Eastern Conference for the first time since 2016, and the first time without LeBron James on their roster.
- The Boston Celtics entered the playoffs for the eleventh consecutive season, the longest such streak in the NBA.
- The Milwaukee Bucks entered the playoffs for the ninth consecutive season.
- The Denver Nuggets entered the playoffs for the seventh consecutive season.
- The Miami Heat entered the playoffs for the sixth consecutive season. They also became the first 10-seed to advance from the play-in tournament into the playoffs.
- The Minnesota Timberwolves entered the playoffs for the fourth consecutive season.
- The New York Knicks, Los Angeles Lakers, and Los Angeles Clippers entered the playoffs for the third consecutive season.
- The Indiana Pacers and Orlando Magic entered the playoffs for the second consecutive season.
- The Golden State Warriors returned to the playoffs after losing in the play-in tournament the previous year.
- The Memphis Grizzlies returned to the playoffs after missing the postseason the previous year.
- The Houston Rockets entered the playoffs for the first time since 2020.
- The Detroit Pistons entered the playoffs for the first time since 2019.
- The New Orleans Pelicans and Dallas Mavericks missed the playoffs after making the postseason the previous year.
- The Phoenix Suns missed the playoffs for the first time since 2020.
- The Philadelphia 76ers missed the playoffs for the first time since 2017.
- The Brooklyn Nets, Sacramento Kings, and Atlanta Hawks missed the playoffs for the second consecutive season.
- The Utah Jazz, Toronto Raptors, and Chicago Bulls missed the playoffs for the third consecutive season.
- The Washington Wizards and Portland Trail Blazers missed the playoffs for the fourth consecutive season.
- The San Antonio Spurs missed the playoffs for the sixth consecutive season.
- The Charlotte Hornets missed the playoffs for the ninth consecutive season, currently the longest active playoff drought in the NBA.

==== Play-in tournament ====
- The Atlanta Hawks competed in the play-in tournament for the fourth consecutive season.
- The Chicago Bulls and Miami Heat competed in the play-in tournament for the third consecutive season.
- The Sacramento Kings and Golden State Warriors competed in the play-in tournament for the second consecutive season.
- The Memphis Grizzlies competed in the play-in tournament for the first time since 2021.
- The Orlando Magic and Dallas Mavericks competed in the play-in tournament for the first time in franchise history.

=== Notable occurrences ===
- With their overtime road victory over the Atlanta Hawks in the No. 8 seed game, the Miami Heat became the first-ever 10-seed to advance from the play-in to the playoffs.
- The Dallas Mavericks became the first team since the 2019–20 Golden State Warriors to miss the playoffs after reaching the NBA Finals the previous season.

=== First round ===
- The Thunder's 51-point victory against the Grizzlies was the largest margin of victory in a Game 1 in NBA history.
- The Pistons' Game 2 victory over the Knicks was their first playoff win since 2008, ending a 15-game postseason losing streak, the longest in NBA history. The Pistons, however, now own the record for the most consecutive home defeats in playoffs history at 10 straight with their three home losses in the first round.
- The Cavaliers made 11 three-pointers in the second quarter of their Game 2 victory over the Heat, setting a postseason record.
- The Thunder overcame a 26-point halftime deficit in their Game 3 victory over the Grizzlies, the largest such comeback in NBA postseason history.
- With the Thunder sweeping the Grizzlies, this marks the 49th straight playoffs where a sweep occurred; the last time this did not happen was in 1976.
- The Cavaliers' 55-point victory over the Heat in Game 4 was the largest series-clinching win in NBA history.
- The Cavaliers' 122-point differential in their series against the Heat was the largest in NBA history.
- Aaron Gordon's Game 4 game-winner was first known game-winning buzzer-beater putback dunk in NBA playoff history.
- By defeating the Lakers, the Timberwolves won a playoff series in consecutive seasons for the first time in franchise history.
- After losing to the Timberwolves, the Lakers were eliminated in the first round as a third seed or higher for the first time in franchise history.
- The Knicks–Pistons series was the second playoff series in NBA history to feature four consecutive games decided by 3 or fewer points.
- The Nuggets–Clippers series was the first of the 2025 playoffs to have a Game 7, making it the 26th consecutive NBA postseason to feature a Game 7. The last time a Game 7 did not occur in the playoffs was 1999. This was the 154th game 7 in NBA playoffs history.
- With the Rockets forcing a Game 7 against the Warriors, this is the first playoffs since 2020 to feature two Game 7's in the first round.
- This is the third postseason where LeBron James was eliminated in the first round.
- The seventh-seeded Warriors defeated the second-seeded Houston in seven games, marking the seventh instance in NBA history of a 7th-seeded team defeating a 2nd-seeded team in the first round, following previous instances in 1987, 1989, 1991, 1998, 2010, and 2023. Additionally, this was only the third time and the second time in three seasons that such an upset occurred in a best-of-seven series, as well as the first time it occurred in seven games and the second time it occurred within the maximum number of games (1998).
- The Warriors became the first team to defeat the second-seed team three times as the seventh-seeded team, following previous instances in 1989 and 1991.

=== Conference semifinals ===
- In the Eastern Conference, the same teams from the previous playoffs represent the final four teams this year. However, the match-ups are different, with the Cavaliers playing the Pacers and the Celtics facing the Knicks. Last year it was the Celtics facing the Cavaliers and the Knicks versus the Pacers.
- The Western Conference Semifinals match-up between Oklahoma City and Denver features the top two MVP favorites in Shai Gilgeous-Alexander and Nikola Jokić. The last time this occurred was in the 2017 first round when James Harden's Rockets defeated Russell Westbrook's Thunder in five games. Westbrook won the MVP that season, while Harden finished a close second.
- This is just the third time in NBA history a sixth seed is facing a seventh seed in the Conference Semifinals. The other times this occurred were in the 1987 WCSF between the Rockets (6) vs SuperSonics (7) and the 2023 WCSF between the Warriors (6) vs Lakers (7).
- In Game 1 against the Knicks, the Celtics set the NBA playoff record for most missed 3-point shots in a game (45).
- With his Game 1 game-winner, Aaron Gordon became the first player in the play-by-play era (since 1996–97) to hit a game-winning shot in the final five seconds of a game on the road multiple times in a single playoff run.
- All four Game 1's of the Conference Semifinals were won by the road team, the first time this has happened in NBA history.
- In Game 1 and 2 in their series vs. the Celtics, the Knicks were the first team to comeback from 20 points or more in back-to-back playoff games in NBA history. In addition, the Celtics were the first team to blow back-to-back 20 point leads in the playoffs.
- The Cavaliers and the Celtics became the first teams since the 1992–93 Phoenix Suns to trail 0–2 before the conference finals as a 60-win team.
- The Thunder scored 87 points in the first half of Game 2 against the Nuggets, setting an NBA playoff record for most points scored in a first half, and tying the NBA playoff record for points in a half set by the Milwaukee Bucks in the 1978 WCSF.
- The Pacers led by 41 points at halftime of Game 4 against the Cavaliers, tying the playoff record set by Cleveland in Game 2 of the 2017 Eastern Conference Finals.
- The Cavaliers were the first Eastern Conference team to win 62 games or more and not make the Eastern Conference Finals.
- With the Cavaliers and Celtics both eliminated, this marked the first time since 2007 that two 60-win teams failed to reach the conference finals.
- The elimination of the Boston Celtics guarantees that there would be a 7th different NBA champion in the last 7 years, the first time this has happened in NBA history.
- The Nuggets-Thunder series was the second-most lopsided series to go seven games in NBA history, following the Celtics-Hawks first round series in 2008.

=== Conference finals ===
- This was the fifth straight season where all four teams competing in the conference finals were different seed numbers (1, 3, 4, 6).
- With the Boston Celtics losing to the New York Knicks in the preceding conference semifinals, this was the sixth straight conference finals without the defending NBA champions.
- Neither the first-seeded team nor the second-seeded team made the Eastern Conference finals for the first time since 2021.
- The conference finals featured teams that had a chance to win their first championship or hadn't won a championship in over four decades:

- The New York Knicks last won the NBA championship in 1973.
- The Oklahoma City Thunder last won the NBA championship in 1979 when they were still known as the Seattle SuperSonics.
- The Indiana Pacers have never won an NBA championship since joining the league in the ABA-NBA merger in 1976.
- The Minnesota Timberwolves have never won an NBA championship or advanced to the NBA Finals since joining the league as an expansion team in 1989.

- This is the first Western Conference Finals since 1996 to not feature a team from California or Texas.
- In Game 1 against the Knicks, the Pacers became the first team since play-by-play records began in 1998 to win after trailing by 9+ points in the final minute of a playoff game. Also in the game, Aaron Nesmith became the first player in NBA history to make six 3-pointers in the fourth quarter of a playoff game.
- Oklahoma City surpassed the 2019 Toronto Raptors' +79 turnover differential for largest in a single-playoff in NBA postseason history. It took Toronto 24 games to accomplish this feat, while Oklahoma City surpassed this mark in their 12th game.
- In Game 4, Tyrese Haliburton became the first player in NBA playoff history to record 30 points, 15 assists and 10 rebounds with no turnovers in a game.
- For the first time since 2015, both the Eastern Conference champions and the Western Conference champions clinched their NBA Finals berth on their home court. (Note: The 2020 NBA playoffs are not counted as all games were played at a neutral site.)

=== NBA Finals ===
- The Thunder are the youngest team to make the NBA Finals since the 1977 Portland Trail Blazers.
- This is the first NBA Finals without a luxury tax team since the salary cap era began in 2002.
- The 18 game difference in wins between the Thunder and Pacers is the largest among NBA Finals participants since the 1981 Finals between the 62-win Celtics and 40-win Rockets.
- The Pacers in Game 1 joined the 1999 Spurs in Game 2 of the Western Conference Finals and the 2002 Lakers in Game 4 of the Western Conference Finals as teams to win a playoff game despite leading for only 20 seconds or less.
  - Indiana also tied the 1992 Chicago Bulls in Game 6 and the 2011 Dallas Mavericks in Game 2 for the largest NBA Finals fourth quarter comeback.
  - Tyrese Haliburton's go-ahead shot with 0.3 seconds left marked the latest game winner in an NBA Finals game since Michael Jordan's buzzer-beating shot in Game 1 of the 1997 Finals.
- Shai Gilgeous-Alexander (72 points) surpassed Allen Iverson (71 points, 2001) for the most combined points scored in a player's first two Finals games.
- In Game 5, Jalen Williams became the third-youngest player since the ABA–NBA merger to score at least 40 points in a Finals game.
  - Jalen Williams and Shai Gilgeous-Alexander joined LeBron James and Kyrie Irving as the only teammates since 1980 to finish a Finals game with 40+ points for one and 30+ points for the other.
- In Game 6, the Pacers became the first team in NBA history with eight players to score at least 200 points in a single playoffs.
- This featured the first NBA Finals Game 7 since 2016.
  - Oklahoma City was the first team to score 100 points or more in an NBA Finals Game 7 since the Los Angeles Lakers and Detroit Pistons scored over the century mark in the 1988 NBA Finals.
  - The Thunder moved to 19–2 after a defeat in both the regular season and playoffs, surpassing the 1986–87 Lakers for the best winning percentage in NBA history after loss in a season.
  - Shai Gilgeous-Alexander became the fourth player to win the league scoring title along with regular season and Finals MVPs in one season, and the first since Shaquille O'Neal of the Los Angeles Lakers in 2000. (Note: The other players were Michael Jordan (four times) and Kareem Abdul-Jabbar (1971).) He was also the first player since LeBron James in 2013 to win a regular season MVP and Finals MVP in the same season.

== Format ==
Eight teams from each conference participate in the playoffs. The top six teams in each conference, based on winning percentage, directly qualify for the playoffs; the seeding order of those teams is also based on winning percentage. If two or more teams had the same record, standard NBA tiebreaker rules are used.

The NBA Board of Governors adopted a trial format in 2021 and permanently starting in 2023 to have a play-in tournament involving the teams ranked 7th through 10th in each conference. The 7th-place team and 8th-place team participate in a "double-chance" game, with the winner advancing to the playoffs as the 7-seed. The loser then plays the winner of the elimination game between the 9th-place and 10th-place teams to determine the playoff's 8-seed. The NBA's regular playoff format then proceeds as normal.

Each conference's bracket is fixed with no reseeding. All rounds are a best-of-seven series; a series ends when one team wins four games, and that team advances to the next round. All rounds, including the NBA Finals, are in a 2–2–1–1–1 format with regards to hosting: the higher-seeded team hosts games 1, 2, 5, and 7; while the lower-seeded team hosts games 3, 4, and 6. In the conference playoffs, home-court advantage goes to the higher-seeded team (number one being the highest). For the NBA Finals, home-court advantage goes to the team with the better regular season record, and, if needed, ties are broken based on head-to-head record, followed by inter-conference record.

== Playoff qualifying ==
On March 5, 2025, the Cleveland Cavaliers became the first team to clinch a playoff spot. While noted in the below tables, division titles have no bearing on seeding.

Seeds 7 and 8 in each conference were determined via the first-stage play-in tournament, held April 15–18.

=== Eastern Conference ===
Seed	Team	Record	Clinched				
Seed	Team	Record	Play-in berth	Playoff berth	Division title	Best record in conference	Best record in NBA
1	Cleveland Cavaliers	64–18	—	March 5	March 11	April 8	—
2	Boston Celtics	61–21	—	March 14	March 29	—	—
3	New York Knicks	51–31	—	March 27	—	—	—
4	Indiana Pacers	50–32	—	April 1	—	—	—
5	Milwaukee Bucks	48–34	—	April 5	—	—	—
6	Detroit Pistons	44–38	—	April 4	—	—	—
7	Orlando Magic	41–41	April 4	April 15	April 9	—	—
8	Miami Heat	37–45	April 3	April 18	—	—	—

Atlanta (40–42) and Chicago (39–43) also secured play-in berths but did not advance to the playoffs.

=== Western Conference ===
Seed	Team	Record	Clinched				
Seed	Team	Record	Play-in berth	Playoff berth	Division title	Best record in conference	Best record in NBA
1	Oklahoma City Thunder	68–14	—	March 12	March 19	March 20	April 9
2	Houston Rockets	52–30	—	April 2	April 2	—	—
3	Los Angeles Lakers	50–32	—	April 9	April 11	—	—
4	Denver Nuggets	50–32	—	April 13	—	—	—
5	Los Angeles Clippers	50–32	—	April 13	—	—	—
6	Minnesota Timberwolves	49–33	—	April 13	—	—	—
7	Golden State Warriors	48–34	April 13	April 15	—	—	—
8	Memphis Grizzlies	48–34	April 11	April 18	—	—	—

Sacramento (40–42) and Dallas (39–43) also secured play-in berths but did not advance to the playoffs.

=== Play-in tournament brackets ===
==== Eastern Conference ====
Play-in games
7	Orlando*	120
8	Atlanta	95
9	Chicago	90
10	Miami	109

No. 8 seed game
8	Atlanta	114
10	Miami	123 (OT)

Final seeds
7	Orlando*	No. 7 seed
10	Miami	No. 8 seed

Bold Game winner
Italic Team with home-court advantage
* Division winner

==== Western Conference ====
Play-in games
7	Golden State	121
8	Memphis	116
9	Sacramento	106
10	Dallas	120

No. 8 seed game
8	Memphis	120
10	Dallas	106

Final seeds
7	Golden State	No. 7 seed
8	Memphis	No. 8 seed

Bold Game winner
Italic Team with home-court advantage

== Bracket ==
Teams in bold advanced to the next round. The numbers to the left of each team indicate the team's seeding in its conference, and the numbers to the right indicate the number of games the team won in that round. The division champions are marked by an asterisk. Teams with home court advantage, the higher seeded team, are shown in italics.

First round	Conference semifinals
**E1**	**Cleveland***	**4**
E8	Miami	0
E1	Cleveland*	1
**E4**	**Indiana**	**4**
**E4**	**Indiana**	**4**
E5	Milwaukee	1
**Eastern Conference**
**E3**	**New York**	**4**
E6	Detroit	2
**E3**	**New York**	**4**
E2	Boston*	2
**E2**	**Boston***	**4**
E7	Orlando*	1
**W1**	**Oklahoma City***	**4**
W8	Memphis	0
**W1**	**Oklahoma City***	**4**
W4	Denver	3
**W4**	**Denver**	**4**
W5	LA Clippers	3
**Western Conference**
W3	LA Lakers*	1
**W6**	**Minnesota**	**4**
**W6**	**Minnesota**	**4**
W7	Golden State	1
W2	Houston*	3
**W7**	**Golden State**	**4**

Conference finals
**E4**	**Indiana**	**4**
E3	New York	2
**W1**	**Oklahoma City***	**4**
W6	Minnesota	1

NBA Finals
E4	Indiana	3
**W1**	**Oklahoma City***	**4**

== First round ==
Note: Times are EDT (UTC−4) as listed by the NBA. If the venue is located in a different time zone, the local time is also given.

=== Eastern Conference first round ===
==== (1) Cleveland Cavaliers vs. (8) Miami Heat ====
TNT/TruTV

April 20
7:00 p.m.

Recap

Miami Heat 100, Cleveland Cavaliers 121
Scoring by quarter: 24–31, 30–31, 25–25, 21–34
Pts: Bam Adebayo 24; Rebs: Bam Adebayo 9 Asts: Davion Mitchell 9	Pts: Donovan Mitchell 30; Rebs: Jarrett Allen 11; Asts: Darius Garland 5
Cleveland leads series, 1–0

Rocket Arena, Cleveland, OH
Attendance: 19,432
Referees: David Guthrie, Courtney Kirkland, Eric Dalen

Donovan Mitchell scored 30 points as the top-seeded Cavaliers cruised to a 121–100 victory in the series opener. Mitchell also tallied four steals, Darius Garland finished with 27 points, and Jarrett Allen notched a double-double for Cleveland. Although the Heat tried to rally in the second half, Cavaliers guard Ty Jerome came off the bench and scored 28 points in his playoff debut, including 16 points (6-of-7 shooting) in the fourth quarter to keep Miami at bay. Bam Adebayo and Tyler Herro both finished with over 20 points for the Heat, while reserve guard Davion Mitchell shot 8-of-12 and dished out a game-high nine assists.

NBA TV

April 23
7:30 p.m.

Recap

Miami Heat 112, Cleveland Cavaliers 121
Scoring by quarter: 24–25, 27–43, 29–25, 32–28
Pts: Tyler Herro 33; Rebs: Bam Adebayo 14; Asts: Bam Adebayo 9	Pts: Donovan Mitchell 30; Rebs: Jarrett Allen 8 Asts: Darius Garland 9
Cleveland leads series, 2–0

Rocket Arena, Cleveland, OH
Attendance: 19,432
Referees: Tony Brothers, Pat Fraher, John Goble

Cleveland fought off a late Miami rally, securing victory and establishing a 2–0 series advantage. Donovan Mitchell had another 30-point performance, including 7 3-pointers, while also logging 6 rebounds and 6 assists. Darius Garland added 21 points and 9 assists, whereas Evan Mobley contributed 20 points and 6 rebounds. Tyler Herro carried the Heat on scoring, notching 33 points and dishing out 5 assists. Bam Adebayo tallied 11 points, 14 rebounds and 9 assists, finishing one assist shy of a triple-double. Haywood Highsmith came off the bench and shot 5-of-6 from beyond the arc en route to 17 points, as the Heat conceded 121 points for the second game in a row.

TNT

April 26
1:00 p.m.

Recap

Cleveland Cavaliers 124, Miami Heat 87
Scoring by quarter: 33–20, 29–22, 26–22, 36–23
Pts: Jarrett Allen 22; Rebs: Jarrett Allen 10; Asts: Ty Jerome 11	Pts: Bam Adebayo 22; Rebs: Bam Adebayo 9 Asts: Davion Mitchell 5
Cleveland leads series, 3–0

Kaseya Center, Miami, FL
Attendance: 19,600
Referees: John Goble, Bill Kennedy, Rodney Mott

Cleveland rolled to a 124–87 victory to take a commanding 3–0 series lead. It was a balanced team effort for the Cavaliers — Jarrett Allen scored 22 points, De'Andre Hunter added 21 points, defensive player of the year Evan Mobley added 19 points, and Max Strus contributed 18 points. Ty Jerome had 13 points and 11 assists in 22 minutes and was a team-high +33. This was the Heat's worst playoff loss in franchise history, which only lasted one game after Game 4's blowout loss. The Cavs took control with a 33–5 run early, out-rebounded Miami 46–29, and outscored the Heat 60–30 in the paint.

TNT/TruTV

April 28
7:30 p.m.

Recap

Cleveland Cavaliers 138, Miami Heat 83
Scoring by quarter: 43–17, 29–16, 39–30, 27–20
Pts: Donovan Mitchell 22; Rebs: Jarrett Allen 12; Asts: Jerome, Mitchell 5 each	Pts: Nikola Jović 24; Rebs: Bam Adebayo 12; Asts: Davion Mitchell 5
Cleveland wins series, 4–0

Kaseya Center, Miami, FL
Attendance: 19,600
Referees: James Williams, Kevin Scott, JB DeRosa

Cleveland advanced to the Eastern Conference semifinals for the second straight season after a 55-point victory, the fourth-biggest playoff win ever. Cleveland won the series by a combined 122 points, one more than the previous record for series margin set by Denver over New Orleans in 2009. Miami was also the first team ever to lose by 30+ points in the playoffs in back-to-back games. All-star point guard Darius Garland missed the final two games of the series for the Cavs with a toe injury.

The series also marked the Cavaliers' first-ever playoff series sweep in franchise history without LeBron James on the roster.

Regular-season series
Cleveland won 2–1 in the regular-season series

December 8, 2024

Recap

Cleveland Cavaliers 113, Miami Heat 122

Kaseya Center, Miami, FL

January 29, 2025

Recap

Cleveland Cavaliers 126, Miami Heat 106

Kaseya Center, Miami, FL

March 5, 2025

Recap

Miami Heat 107, Cleveland Cavaliers 112

Rocket Arena, Cleveland, OH

This was the first playoff meeting between these two teams.

==== (2) Boston Celtics vs. (7) Orlando Magic ====
ABC

April 20
3:30 p.m.

Recap

Orlando Magic 86, Boston Celtics 103
Scoring by quarter: 18–26, 31–22, 18–30, 19–25
Pts: Paolo Banchero 36; Rebs: Wendell Carter Jr. 13; Asts: Franz Wagner 5	Pts: Derrick White 30; Rebs: Jayson Tatum 14; Asts: Jrue Holiday 5
Boston leads series, 1–0

TD Garden, Boston, MA
Attendance: 19,156
Referees: Zach Zarba, Mitchell Ervin, Jacyn Goble

After Orlando held a slim 1-point lead at halftime, Boston dominated the second half, winning 103–86 at TD Garden in Game 1. Derrick White was the main contributor for the Celtics on offense, knocking down 7 3-pointers en route to 30 points. Jayson Tatum notched a double-double with 17 points and 14 rebounds, albeit going 1-of-8 from beyond the arc. Payton Pritchard added 19 points on 75 percent field goal percentage as a substitute. For the Magic, Paolo Banchero scored a game-high 36 points, while also logging 11 rebounds. Franz Wagner finished with 25 points and 5 assists, while Wendell Carter Jr. grabbed 13 boards.

TNT/TruTV

April 23
7:00 p.m.

Recap

Orlando Magic 100, Boston Celtics 109
Scoring by quarter: 21–23, 26–27, 24–31, 29–28
Pts: Paolo Banchero 32; Rebs: Paolo Banchero 9 Asts: Paolo Banchero 7	Pts: Jaylen Brown 36; Rebs: three players 10 each (Note: Brown, Holiday, and Horford); Asts: Jrue Holiday 6
Boston leads series, 2–0

TD Garden, Boston, MA
Attendance: 19,156
Referees: James Williams, Ed Malloy, Brent Barnaky

The defending champions secured 2–0 series lead with a 109–100 victory in Game 2. Jaylen Brown led the way for the Celtics, logging 36 points, 10 rebounds and 5 assists. Kristaps Porziņģis (who had to shortly leave the game after an accidental elbow to the forehead by Goga Bitadze in the last seconds of the third quarter) notched 20 points and 10 rebounds. Al Horford also grabbed 10 boards, as the Celtics outrebounded their opponents 46–34. The Magic were again reliant on Paolo Banchero and Franz Wagner, with the former contributing 32 points, 9 rebounds and 7 assists, while the latter scored 25 points. Wendell Carter Jr. added 16 points and 8 rebounds, as Orlando were limited to no more than 100 points for the second consecutive game. Boston's star forward Jayson Tatum did not play in the game due to a wrist injury suffered in Game 1; it was the first playoff game he missed in his career.

ESPN

April 25
7:00 p.m.

Recap

Boston Celtics 93, Orlando Magic 95
Scoring by quarter: 27–31, 32–18, 11–24, 23–22
Pts: Jayson Tatum 36; Rebs: Jayson Tatum 9 Asts: Derrick White 5	Pts: Franz Wagner 32; Rebs: Wendell Carter Jr. 12; Asts: Franz Wagner 8
Boston leads series, 2–1

Kia Center, Orlando, FL
Attendance: 18,967
Referees: David Guthrie, Courtney Kirkland, Tre Maddox

Franz Wagner (32 points on 11-of-27 shooting, 7 rebounds, 8 assists) and Paolo Banchero (29 points on 10-of-25 shooting) efforts were enough for the Magic to outlast the Celtics in a close Game 3 victory. A returning Jayson Tatum scored 36 points and had 9 rebounds, but committed 7 turnovers, while co-star Jaylen Brown also had 6 turnovers. Altogether, the Celtics committed 20 turnovers in the game. After a stellar Game 2, Kristaps Porziņģis (with his head bandaged after the elbow to the forehead in Game 2) scored just 7 points on 3-of-10 shooting, with a team-worst -16 plus-minus. In the fourth quarter, the duo of Wagner and Banchero scored 18 of the Magic's 22 points.

TNT

April 27
7:00 p.m.

Recap

Boston Celtics 107, Orlando Magic 98
Scoring by quarter: 32–29, 21–19, 26–27, 28–23
Pts: Jayson Tatum 37; Rebs: Jayson Tatum 14; Asts: Derrick White 7	Pts: Paolo Banchero 31; Rebs: Wendell Carter Jr. 11; Asts: Franz Wagner 7
Boston leads series, 3–1

Kia Center, Orlando, FL
Attendance: 19,073
Referees: Marc Davis, Tyler Ford, Andy Nagy

Jayson Tatum scored 37 points and pulled down 14 rebounds and Jaylen Brown added 21 points and 11 rebounds, as the Boston Celtics took a 3–1 lead over the Orlando Magic in Game 4. Kristaps Porziņģis scored 19 points, including a dunk of his own missed layup that put Boston ahead for good with 3:58 left. Paolo Banchero led Orlando with 31 points.

NBA TV

April 29
8:30 p.m.

Recap

Orlando Magic 89, Boston Celtics 120
Scoring by quarter: 27–23, 22–24, 13–36, 27–37
Pts: Franz Wagner 25; Rebs: Wendell Carter Jr. 11; Asts: Paolo Banchero 6	Pts: Jayson Tatum 35; Rebs: Jayson Tatum 8 Asts: Jayson Tatum 10
Boston wins series, 4–1

TD Garden, Boston, MA
Attendance: 19,156
Referees: Tony Brothers, Mark Lindsay, Gediminas Petraitis

The Celtics advanced to the Eastern Conference semifinals behind Jayson Tatum's 35-points, 10-assists, and 8-rebounds effort. The game was tied at 53 when Magic star Paolo Banchero went to the bench with five fouls early in the third quarter. When he came back into the game at the start of the fourth quarter, the Celtics were up 83–62 and they never looked back, cruising to a 120–89 win.

Regular-season series
Orlando won 2–1 in the regular-season series

December 23, 2024

Recap

Boston Celtics 104, Orlando Magic 108

Kia Center, Orlando, FL

January 17, 2025

Recap

Orlando Magic 94, Boston Celtics 121

TD Garden, Boston, MA

April 9, 2025

Recap

Boston Celtics 76, Orlando Magic 96

Kia Center, Orlando, FL

This was the fourth playoff meeting between these two teams and the first since 2010, with the Magic winning two of the first three meetings.

Previous playoff series
Orlando leads 2–1 in all-time playoff series

1995

Orlando Magic 3, Boston Celtics 1

1995 Eastern Conference First Round

2009

Boston Celtics 3, Orlando Magic 4

2009 Eastern Conference Semifinals

2010

Orlando Magic 2, Boston Celtics 4

2010 Eastern Conference Finals

==== (3) New York Knicks vs. (6) Detroit Pistons ====
ESPN

April 19
6:00 p.m.

Recap

Detroit Pistons 112, New York Knicks 123
Scoring by quarter: 27–27, 28–30, 36–26, 21–40
Pts: Tobias Harris 25; Rebs: four players 6 each (Note: Cunningham, Duren, Harris, and Thompson); Asts: Cade Cunningham 12	Pts: Jalen Brunson 34; Rebs: Karl-Anthony Towns 11; Asts: Jalen Brunson 8
New York leads series, 1–0

Madison Square Garden, New York, NY
Attendance: 19,812
Referees: John Goble, Bill Kennedy, Karl Lane

After three tightly contested quarters, New York strung together a 21–0 run in the fourth, propelling them to a 123–112 victory over Detroit. Jalen Brunson led the scoring for the Knicks, finishing with 34 points, along with 8 assists. Karl-Anthony Towns put up an all-rounded performance, logging 23 points, 11 rebounds, 5 assists, 4 steals and 2 blocks, while OG Anunoby added another 23 points, 7 rebounds and 5 steals. For the Pistons, Cade Cunningham scored 21 and dished out 12 assists in his playoff debut, whereas Tobias Harris shot 80 percent from beyond the arc en route to 25 points. Malik Beasley came off the bench and made 6 3-pointers, contributing 20 points, as Detroit were denied their first playoff win since 2008.

TNT/TruTV

April 21
7:30 p.m.

Recap

Detroit Pistons 100, New York Knicks 94
Scoring by quarter: 25–18, 30–31, 20–18, 25–27
Pts: Cade Cunningham 33; Rebs: Duren, Harris 13 each Asts: Cunningham, Schröder 3 each	Pts: Jalen Brunson 37; Rebs: Hart, Robinson 7 each Asts: Jalen Brunson 7
Series tied, 1–1

Madison Square Garden, New York, NY
Attendance: 19,812
Referees: Josh Tiven, Curtis Blair, Ray Acosta

In just his second playoff game, Pistons' star Cade Cunningham led his team to a victory with 33 points on 11-of-21 shooting and 12 rebounds performance. Detroit led for most of the game, but a late 4th quarter New York rally was halted by a Dennis Schröder (who had 20 pts off the bench) three-point shot with 55.1 seconds to break the tie and give Detroit the eventual win. Jalen Brunson had another 30-point effort with 37 in total, as well as 7 assists. With the victory, Detroit ended an NBA record 15-game playoff losing streak, which spanned 17 years.

TNT

April 24
7:00 p.m.

Recap

New York Knicks 118, Detroit Pistons 116
Scoring by quarter: 33–27, 33–26, 27–30, 25–33
Pts: Karl-Anthony Towns 31; Rebs: Josh Hart 11; Asts: Brunson, Hart 9 each	Pts: Cunningham, Hardaway Jr. 24 each Rebs: Duren, Reed 8 each Asts: Cade Cunningham 11
New York leads series, 2–1

Little Caesars Arena, Detroit, MI
Attendance: 20,062
Referees: Zach Zarba, Sean Wright, Nick Buchert

Jalen Brunson (30 points, 11-of-13 from free throws) and Karl-Anthony Towns (31 points, 10-of-18 shooting, 4 three-point makes) starred in a close Game 3 victory to take a 2–1 series. Towns was aggressive early and Jalen Brunson was effective late. Towns scored 11 of his 31 points in the first quarter while Brunson had 12 of his 30 in the fourth. In addition, OG Anunoby scored 22 points and Mikal Bridges added 20 points for the Knicks. Detroit's Cade Cunningham scored 24 points and had 11 assists, but missed 15-of-25 shots and had six turnovers. Tim Hardaway Jr. had 24 points, making a career playoff-high seven 3-pointers. Dennis Schroder scored 18 points off the bench and Jalen Duren had 16 for the Pistons. The Pistons pulled within one point twice in the third, but the Knicks went on another surge to take a 10-point lead into the final quarter and the cushion was comfortable enough to hold off Detroit's attempts to rally.

ABC

April 27
1:00 p.m.

Recap

New York Knicks 94, Detroit Pistons 93
Scoring by quarter: 29–19, 21–24, 14–28, 30–22
Pts: Jalen Brunson 32; Rebs: Josh Hart 10; Asts: Jalen Brunson 11	Pts: Cade Cunningham 25; Rebs: Jalen Duren 17; Asts: Cade Cunningham 10
New York leads series, 3–1

Little Caesars Arena, Detroit, MI
Attendance: 20,062
Referees: David Guthrie, Brian Forte, Kevin Cutler

Jalen Brunson (32 points, 11 assists, and 13-of-26 shooting) and Karl-Anthony Towns (27 points, 9 rebounds, and 10-of-23 shooting) would again star for the Knicks in a thrilling Game 4 victory. The game was close throughout and a Karl-Anthony Towns go-ahead 3-pointer with 46.6 seconds left would ultimately be the difference. Game 4 was a physical game with few whistles as seen on the last possession of the game. On the play, Tim Hardaway Jr. shot a 3-pointer just before the buzzer and drew contact from New York’s Josh Hart that wasn't called a foul. David Guthrie, the crew chief for the game, said afterward that the officials made a mistake. “After postgame review, we observed that Hart makes body contact that is more than marginal to Hardaway Jr. and a foul should have been called,” Guthrie said. Had the foul been called, Hardaway would have gone to the foul line for three free throws that could have given Detroit the lead and win.

In addition, the Pistons have lost nine straight home playoff games since 2008, tying an NBA record set by Philadelphia 76ers from 1968 to 1971. Cade Cunningham finished with the Pistons first playoff triple-double since Isiah Thomas in 1989.

TNT/TruTV

April 29
7:30 p.m.

Recap

Detroit Pistons 106, New York Knicks 103
Scoring by quarter: 22–23, 27–27, 28–24, 29–29
Pts: Cade Cunningham 24; Rebs: Jalen Duren 14; Asts: Cade Cunningham 8	Pts: OG Anunoby 19; Rebs: Robinson, Towns 11 each Asts: Jalen Brunson 7
New York leads series, 3–2

Madison Square Garden, New York, NY
Attendance: 19,812
Referees: Marc Davis, Tyler Ford, Jacyn Goble

The Pistons spoiled the Knicks chance to clinch their first playoff series victory at Madison Square Garden since the 1999 conference finals, with a 106–103 win. Ausar Thompson’s athleticism was on full display on offense (22 points in 28 minutes, with his points mostly scored in the paint) and defense (2 blocks and holding Jalen Brunson to an off shooting night). Cade Cunningham led the Pistons in scoring again with 24 points, plus 8 rebounds and assists. Tobias Harris had 17 points, 8 rebounds, and made three 3-pointers. In defeat, six Knicks were in double figures in scoring.

TNT/TruTV

May 1
7:30 p.m.

Recap

New York Knicks 116, Detroit Pistons 113
Scoring by quarter: 37–23, 22–38, 37–24, 20–28
Pts: Jalen Brunson 40; Rebs: Karl-Anthony Towns 15; Asts: Jalen Brunson 7	Pts: Cade Cunningham 23; Rebs: Cade Cunningham 7 Asts: Dennis Schröder 9
New York wins series, 4–2

Little Caesars Arena, Detroit, MI
Attendance: 20,062
Referees: Tony Brothers, Ed Malloy, Mark Lindsay

Jalen Brunson's game-winning 3-pointer with 4.3 seconds left finished off the Pistons in another hard-fought playoff game in this series. Detroit did not get a shot off to potentially tie the game and send it to overtime because Malik Beasley fumbled a pass with 0.4 second left. With 2:35 left, Brunson and the Knicks went on a 11–1 run to seal to the game, 116–113. Brunson scored 40 points, Mikal Bridges had 25 points, and OG Anunoby added 22 for the Knicks. Cade Cunningham had 23 points, eight assists and seven rebounds, but went 0-for-8 on 3-pointers. The Pistons as a team were just 9-for-24 from three. Jalen Duren scored 21 points on 6-of-9 shooting and 9-of-10 from the free thrown line. The Pistons now own the record for most consecutive playoff home losses, with 10. The final average margin for the series was 4.3, which was the lowest in a series of 5+ games in 25 years.

Regular-season series
Detroit won 3–1 in the regular-season series

November 1, 2024

Recap

New York Knicks 128, Detroit Pistons 98

Little Caesars Arena, Detroit, MI

December 7, 2024

Recap

Detroit Pistons 120, New York Knicks 111

Madison Square Garden, New York, NY

January 13, 2025

Recap

Detroit Pistons 124, New York Knicks 119

Madison Square Garden, New York, NY

April 10, 2025

Recap

New York Knicks 106, Detroit Pistons 115

Little Caesars Arena, Detroit, MI

This was the fourth playoff meeting between these two teams and the first since 1992, with the Knicks winning two of the first three meetings.

Previous playoff series
New York leads 2–1 in all-time playoff series

1984

Detroit Pistons 2, New York Knicks 3

1984 Eastern Conference First Round

1990

Detroit Pistons 4, New York Knicks 1

1990 Eastern Conference Semifinals

1992

New York Knicks 3, Detroit Pistons 2

1992 Eastern Conference First Round

==== (4) Indiana Pacers vs. (5) Milwaukee Bucks ====
ESPN

April 19
1:00 p.m.

Recap

Milwaukee Bucks 98, Indiana Pacers 117
Scoring by quarter: 25–33, 18–34, 33–26, 22–24
Pts: Giannis Antetokounmpo 36; Rebs: Giannis Antetokounmpo 12; Asts: Kevin Porter Jr. 5	Pts: Pascal Siakam 25; Rebs: Haliburton, Siakam 7 each Asts: Tyrese Haliburton 12
Indiana leads series, 1–0

Gainbridge Fieldhouse, Indianapolis, IN
Attendance: 17,274
Referees: Josh Tiven, Curtis Blair, Tre Maddox

Leading by as much as 28 points, Indiana cruised to a 117–98 win over their Central Division rivals. Pascal Siakam scored 25 and grabbed 7 rebounds for the Pacers, while Myles Turner added 19 points on 4-of-6 3-point shooting. Tyrese Haliburton notched a double-double of 10 points and 12 assists, albeit missing all 7 of his 3-point attempts. The Bucks, without Damian Lillard, were heavily reliant on Giannis Antetokounmpo for scoring. Antetokounmpo logged 36 points and 12 rebounds in the losing effort. Notably, Kyle Kuzma, as a starter, recorded a stat line of 0 points, 0 rebounds, 0 assists, 0 steals, 0 blocks and 2 fouls in 21 minutes, ending with a team-worst plus-minus value of –24.

NBA TV

April 22
7:00 p.m.

Recap

Milwaukee Bucks 115, Indiana Pacers 123
Scoring by quarter: 30–40, 30–28, 27–31, 28–24
Pts: Giannis Antetokounmpo 34; Rebs: Giannis Antetokounmpo 18; Asts: Antetokounmpo, Lillard 7	Pts: Pascal Siakam 24; Rebs: Pascal Siakam 11; Asts: Tyrese Haliburton 12
Indiana leads series, 2–0

Gainbridge Fieldhouse, Indianapolis, IN
Attendance: 17,274
Referees: Zach Zarba, Sean Wright, Gediminas Petraitis

Indiana held off a late Milwaukee fourth quarter surge to take a 2–0 lead in the series. The Pacers played another efficient game on offense (48.9 percent on field goals, 44.4 percent from beyond the arc) led by Pascal Siakam (24 points, 11 rebounds), Tyrese Haliburton (21 points, 12 assists) double-double efforts. Giannis Antetokounmpo led the way for the Bucks with 34 points on 14-of-20 shooting, 17 rebounds, and 7 assists. Milwaukee also received a lift from Damian Lillard, who was playing in his first game since March 18.

ESPNU/NBA TV

April 25
8:00 p.m. (7:00 p.m. CDT)

Recap

Indiana Pacers 101, Milwaukee Bucks 117
Scoring by quarter: 26–26, 31–21, 18–39, 26–31
Pts: Pascal Siakam 28; Rebs: Haliburton, Nesmith 7 Asts: Tyrese Haliburton 10	Pts: Antetokounmpo, Trent Jr. 37 each Rebs: Giannis Antetokounmpo 12; Asts: Antetokounmpo, Porter Jr. 6 each
Indiana leads series, 2–1

Fiserv Forum, Milwaukee, WI
Attendance: 17,942
Referees: Marc Davis, Ed Malloy, Justin Van Duyne

Milwaukee dominated the game in the second half and cut Indiana's series lead to 2–1. Giannis Antetokounmpo and Gary Trent Jr. each scored 37 points, with the latter also making a franchise-record nine three-pointers. Pascal Siakam had 28 points and Aaron Nesmith scored 18 for the Pacers. Tyrese Haliburton finished with 14 points and 10 assists.

TNT

April 27
9:30 p.m. (8:30 p.m. CDT)

Recap

Indiana Pacers 129, Milwaukee Bucks 103
Scoring by quarter: 30–24, 33–28, 38–32, 28–19
Pts: Myles Turner 23; Rebs: Tyrese Haliburton 8 Asts: Tyrese Haliburton 15	Pts: Giannis Antetokounmpo 28; Rebs: Giannis Antetokounmpo 15; Asts: Antetokounmpo, Porter Jr. 6 each
Indiana leads series, 3–1

Fiserv Forum, Milwaukee, WI
Attendance: 17,855
Referees: Tony Brothers, Mark Lindsay, Karl Lane

The Pacers shot 60 percent from the field and 46 percent from three to take a commanding 3–1 series lead. Eight Pacers players scored 12 points or more, led by Myles Turner (23 points, 4 blocks), Andrew Nembhard (20 points), and Tyrese Haliburton (17 points, 15 assists). Giannis Antetokounmpo continued to carry Milwaukee, with 28 points, 15 rebounds, and 6 assists; however, only two other Bucks players scored 10 points or more. Damian Lillard tore his Achilles tendon in the first quarter of the game, ending his season.

NBA TV

April 29
6:00 p.m.

Recap

Milwaukee Bucks 118, Indiana Pacers 119 (OT)
Scoring by quarter: 30–13, 17–28, 28–34, 28–28, Overtime: 15–16
Pts: Gary Trent Jr. 33; Rebs: Giannis Antetokounmpo 20; Asts: Giannis Antetokounmpo 13	Pts: Tyrese Haliburton 26; Rebs: Aaron Nesmith 12; Asts: Tyrese Haliburton 9
Indiana wins series, 4–1

Gainbridge Fieldhouse, Indianapolis, IN
Attendance: 17,274
Referees: David Guthrie, Courtney Kirkland, Brian Forte

The Bucks' season ended in stunning fashion, blowing a 4-point lead with 60 seconds in the fourth quarter and a 7-point lead with 45 seconds in overtime. Gary Trent Jr. took over for Milwaukee in overtime, scoring 12 points in overtime (all from three), but his fumble and turnover out of bounds gave the ball to Indiana with 10.1 seconds left. From there, a Tyrese Haliburton crossover and layup over Giannis Antetokounmpo gave the Pacers the 119–118 lead with 1.1 seconds left. With no more timeouts, the Bucks could not advance the ball and a Trent Jr. half court heave was not close, thus giving the Pacers the win and series victory. Postgame, two non-physical incidents occurred between Antetokounmpo and Tyrese Haliburton’s father, and Antetokounmpo and Bennedict Mathurin.

Regular-season series
Milwaukee won 3–1 in the regular-season series

November 22, 2024

Recap

Indiana Pacers 117, Milwaukee Bucks 129

Fiserv Forum, Milwaukee, WI

December 31, 2024

Recap

Milwaukee Bucks 120, Indiana Pacers 112

Gainbridge Fieldhouse, Indianapolis, IN

March 11, 2025

Recap

Milwaukee Bucks 114, Indiana Pacers 115

Gainbridge Fieldhouse, Indianapolis, IN

March 15, 2025

Recap

Indiana Pacers 119, Milwaukee Bucks 126

Fiserv Forum, Milwaukee, WI

This was the fourth playoff meeting between these two teams and a rematch of the previous season's first round matchup, with the Pacers winning the first three meetings.

Previous playoff series
Indiana leads 3–0 in all-time playoff series

1999

Indiana Pacers 3, Milwaukee Bucks 0

1999 Eastern Conference first round

2000

Indiana Pacers 3, Milwaukee Bucks 2

2000 Eastern Conference first round

2024

Milwaukee Bucks 2, Indiana Pacers 4

2024 Eastern Conference first round

=== Western Conference first round ===
==== (1) Oklahoma City Thunder vs. (8) Memphis Grizzlies ====
ABC

April 20
1:00 p.m. (12:00 p.m. CDT)

Recap

Memphis Grizzlies 80, Oklahoma City Thunder 131
Scoring by quarter: 20–32, 16–36, 27–44, 17–19
Pts: Bagley III, Morant 17 each Rebs: Zach Edey 9 Asts: Morant, Pippen Jr. 4 each	Pts: Aaron Wiggins 21; Rebs: Chet Holmgren 10; Asts: Jalen Williams 6
Oklahoma City leads series, 1–0

Paycom Center, Oklahoma City, OK
Attendance: 18,203
Referees: Tony Brothers, Nick Buchert, JB DeRosa

The Thunder won by a heavy landslide, outscoring the Grizzlies in every quarter, as they secured a 51-point win following a 32-point lead at halftime. This was the largest-ever point differential in Game 1 of an NBA playoff series and the fifth largest in any playoff game. Six Oklahoma City players scored double-digit points, while Shai Gilgeous-Alexander played 23 minutes and scored 15 points, his lowest-scoring game of the season. Desmond Bane emerged from the game with the ignominy of being the first NBA player in the 21st century to have a plus-minus lower than minus-50, with minus-51.

TNT/TruTV

April 22
7:30 p.m. (6:30 p.m. CDT)

Recap

Memphis Grizzlies 99, Oklahoma City Thunder 118
Scoring by quarter: 17–32, 35–38, 27–20, 20–28
Pts: Jaren Jackson Jr. 26; Rebs: Desmond Bane 12; Asts: Ja Morant 6	Pts: Shai Gilgeous-Alexander 27; Rebs: Chet Holmgren 11; Asts: Gilgeous-Alexander, Jal. Williams 5 each
Oklahoma City leads series, 2–0

Paycom Center, Oklahoma City, OK
Attendance: 18,203
Referees: John Goble, Brian Forte, John Butler

Fresh off their blowout victory in Game 1, the Thunder dominate yet again in Game 2 to take a commanding 2–0 series lead. The Thunder opened the game with a 9–0 run, and never trailed throughout the game. Shai Gilgeous-Alexander led the Thunder with 27 points, while Jalen Williams added 24 points, and Chet Holmgren put up a 20-point, 11-rebound double-double. For the Grizzlies, Jaren Jackson Jr. scored 26 points, and Ja Morant added 23 points, both in a losing effort. For the second straight game, Memphis was held to under 100 points, and was scoreless in the first four minutes of the fourth quarter.

TNT

April 24
9:30 p.m. (8:30 p.m. CDT)

Recap

Oklahoma City Thunder 114, Memphis Grizzlies 108
Scoring by quarter: 29–40, 22–37, 36–18, 27–13
Pts: Shai Gilgeous-Alexander 31; Rebs: Chet Holmgren 8 Asts: Shai Gilgeous-Alexander 8	Pts: Scotty Pippen Jr. 28; Rebs: Desmond Bane 8 Asts: Morant, Pippen Jr. 5 each
Oklahoma City leads series, 3–0

FedExForum, Memphis, TN
Attendance: 16,849
Referees: Josh Tiven, Mitchell Ervin, Kevin Cutler

After trailing 51–77 at halftime, the Thunder came back from a 29-point deficit to move on the verge of a sweep. It tied a record for the second largest comeback in an NBA playoff history, only behind the April 15, 2019, game between the Los Angeles Clippers and the Golden State Warriors (31 points). Shai Gilgeous-Alexander led the Thunder with 31 points, while Jalen Williams added 26 points, and Chet Holmgren scored 23 of his 24 points in the second half. Scotty Pippen Jr. led the Grizzlies with 28 points. Ja Morant had 15 points and five assists, but left the game early after a hip injury; on the play, Morant attempted to jump over Luguentz Dort on a contested dunk attempt.

TNT

April 26
3:30 p.m. (2:30 p.m. CDT)

Recap

Oklahoma City Thunder 117, Memphis Grizzlies 115
Scoring by quarter: 34–31, 26–28, 28–26, 29–30
Pts: Shai Gilgeous-Alexander 38; Rebs: Isaiah Hartenstein 12; Asts: Shai Gilgeous-Alexander 6	Pts: Scotty Pippen Jr. 30; Rebs: Scotty Pippen Jr. 11; Asts: Desmond Bane 5
Oklahoma City wins series, 4–0

FedExForum, Memphis, TN
Attendance: 16,667
Referees: James Capers, Pat Fraher, Brent Barnaky

Oklahoma City advanced to the Western Conference semifinals after a close 117–115 Game 4 victory. Shai Gilgeous-Alexander scored 38 points on 13-of-24 shooting and 11-of-13 from the free throw line, while Jalen Williams added 23 points on 10-of-21 shooting. Joining them in double figures for the Thunder were Isaiah Hartenstein (11 points, 12 rebounds), Chet Holmgren (11 points), and Aaron Wiggins (11 points) off the bench. With no Ja Morant due to injury, Memphis received big contributions from role-players Scotty Pippen Jr. (30 points, 11 rebounds, but 5 turnovers) and Santi Aldama (23 points, 9 rebounds, 9-of-13 shooting). Desmond Bane added 23 points, but also had 5 turnovers. Overall, Memphis turned the ball over 21 times. With the Thunder's victory, it extended their win streak over the Grizzlies to 12 games.

Regular-season series
Oklahoma City won 4–0 in the regular-season series

December 29, 2024

Recap

Memphis Grizzlies 106, Oklahoma City Thunder 130

Paycom Center, Oklahoma City, OK

February 8, 2025

Recap

Oklahoma City Thunder 125, Memphis Grizzlies 112

FedExForum, Memphis, TN

March 5, 2025

Recap

Oklahoma City Thunder 120, Memphis Grizzlies 103

FedExForum, Memphis, TN

March 27, 2025

Recap

Memphis Grizzlies 104, Oklahoma City Thunder 125

Paycom Center, Oklahoma City, OK

This was the fourth playoff meeting between these two teams and the first since 2014, with the Thunder winning two of the first three meetings.

Previous playoff series
Oklahoma City leads 2–1 in all-time playoff series

2011

Oklahoma City Thunder 4, Memphis Grizzlies 3

2011 Western Conference semifinals

2013

Oklahoma City Thunder 1, Memphis Grizzlies 4

2013 Western Conference semifinals

2014

Oklahoma City Thunder 4, Memphis Grizzlies 3

2014 Western Conference first round

==== (2) Houston Rockets vs. (7) Golden State Warriors ====
TNT/TruTV

April 20
9:30 p.m. (8:30 p.m. CDT)

Recap

Golden State Warriors 95, Houston Rockets 85
Scoring by quarter: 18–21, 29–13, 22–26, 26–25
Pts: Stephen Curry 31; Rebs: Brandin Podziemski 8 Asts: Jimmy Butler 6	Pts: Alperen Şengün 26; Rebs: Steven Adams 12; Asts: Fred VanVleet 7
Golden State leads series, 1–0

Toyota Center, Houston, TX
Attendance: 18,055
Referees: James Capers, Ben Taylor, Gediminas Petraitis

Despite a late rally in the 4th quarter from Houston, Golden State took lead early in the 2nd quarter and never relinquished it in a 95–85 victory. They were led by their dynamic duo of Jimmy Butler (25 points, 7 rebounds, 6 assists) and Stephen Curry (31 points, 6 rebounds, 5 three-point makes). Houston, playing in their first postseason game since 2020, were held to the lowest scoring output of the season. Houston’s Alperen Şengün had 26 points, which included a poster dunk on Draymond Green in the 1st quarter, and 9 rebounds. This was the Warriors' first road playoff win since Game 7 of the first round against Sacramento in 2023. Warriors head coach Steve Kerr became the seventh head coach to win 100 playoff games, tying Larry Brown for sixth place in the list.

TNT/TruTV

April 23
9:30 p.m. (8:30 p.m. CDT)

Recap

Golden State Warriors 94, Houston Rockets 109
Scoring by quarter: 18–28, 28–32, 25–27, 23–22
Pts: Stephen Curry 20; Rebs: Curry, Green 5 Asts: Stephen Curry 9	Pts: Jalen Green 38; Rebs: Alperen Şengün 16; Asts: Alperen Şengün 7
Series tied, 1–1

Toyota Center, Houston, TX
Attendance: 18,055
Referees: David Guthrie, Courtney Kirkland, Sean Corbin

Houston never trailed in this game, producing a dominant 109–94 win to even the series. Jalen Green made 8 3-pointers, finishing with 38 points, 6 assists and 3 steals. Alperen Şengün came up with a double-double, notching 17 points and 16 rebounds, while Tari Eason came off the bench to score 14 points on 6-of-9 field goal shooting. Nobody on the Warriors scored over 20 points, with Stephen Curry scoring exactly 20, along with 9 assists and 5 rebounds, but also 6 turnovers. Moses Moody and Quinten Post each added 12 points. Jimmy Butler exited the game with 2:28 remaining in the 1st quarter, after sustaining a heavy fall while trying to get a defensive rebound. He was later diagnosed with a pelvic contusion.

ABC

April 26
8:30 p.m. (5:30 p.m. PDT)

Recap

Houston Rockets 93, Golden State Warriors 104
Scoring by quarter: 22–18, 27–28, 22–23, 22–35
Pts: Fred VanVleet 17; Rebs: Alperen Şengün 11; Asts: Jalen Green 5	Pts: Stephen Curry 36; Rebs: Quinten Post 12; Asts: Stephen Curry 9
Golden State leads series, 2–1

Chase Center, San Francisco, CA
Attendance: 18,064
Referees: James Williams, Kevin Scott, Curtis Blair

After being limited to below 100 points for two straight games, Golden State finally got past that mark with a 104–93 victory over Houston. Stephen Curry led the Warriors in the absence of co-star Jimmy Butler, tallying 36 points, 9 assists, and 7 rebounds. Buddy Hield had 17 points off the bench with five 3-pointers as the Warriors won their sixth straight Game 3 in the opening round. Gary Payton II scored 11 of his 16 points in the fourth quarter. Like Game 1, it was another inefficient game for the Rockets on offense, shooting just 39 percent from the floor. Fred VanVleet's shooting struggles continued, as he is now shooting 11–41 and 6-29 from three for the series. With the win, Warriors head coach Steve Kerr officially earned his 101st playoff win, passing Larry Brown for the 6th place on the NBA's all-time playoff victories as head coach.

TNT/TruTV

April 28
10:00 p.m. (7:00 p.m. PDT)

Recap

Houston Rockets 106, Golden State Warriors 109
Scoring by quarter: 26–28, 31–22, 23–32, 26–27
Pts: Alperen Şengün 31; Rebs: Alperen Şengün 10; Asts: Fred VanVleet 6	Pts: Jimmy Butler 27; Rebs: Draymond Green 8 Asts: Jimmy Butler 6
Golden State leads series, 3–1

Chase Center, San Francisco, CA
Attendance: 18,064
Referees: John Goble, Bill Kennedy, Pat Fraher

Coming off an injury in Game 2, Jimmy Butler returned and put up 27 points, leading the Warriors in a 109–106 victory over Houston. Brandin Podziemski started, scoring 26 points, ahead of Stephen Curry and Buddy Hield, the latter of which who continued his good form with 15 points off the bench. The Rockets, spearheaded by Alperen Şengün with 31 points and 10 rebounds, lagged behind the Warriors in the first, third, and fourth quarters as they only made 61.3 percent of their free throws at 19–31. Fred VanVleet made a return to shooting form as he added 25 points while going 8–11 from the three-point line. In the fourth quarter, it was a tight game as the Warriors slightly edged Houston at 107–106 with 13 seconds left; Butler ultimately made two free throw shots to take the Warriors home.

TNT/TruTV

April 30
7:30 p.m. (6:30 p.m. CDT)

Recap

Golden State Warriors 116, Houston Rockets 131
Scoring by quarter: 24–40, 25–36, 31–31, 36–24
Pts: Moses Moody 25; Rebs: Moses Moody 9 Asts: Stephen Curry 7	Pts: Fred VanVleet 26; Rebs: Alperen Şengün 9 Asts: Alperen Şengün 9
Golden State leads series, 3–2

Toyota Center, Houston, TX
Attendance: 18,055
Referees: Zach Zarba, Sean Wright, Nick Buchert

The Rockets kept their season alive with a blowout win in Game 5 at home. Fred VanVleet scored 26 points on 8-of-13 shooting to lead the Rockets, while Amen Thompson had a breakout performance with 25 points on 8-of-12 shooting, 5 steals, 3 blocks. Dillon Brooks also added 24 points in the 131–116 win. Overall, the Rockets shot 55 percent from beyond the arc. Warriors coach Steve Kerr threw in the towel early with the game out of hand. A layup by VanVleet midway through the third quarter made it 93–64, and Kerr called a timeout and cleared his bench. The Warriors' reserves got the lead to just a 14-point deficit, but it never got any closer than that.

ESPN

May 2
9:00 p.m. (6:00 p.m. PDT)

Recap

Houston Rockets 115, Golden State Warriors 107
Scoring by quarter: 25–21, 28–27, 33–36, 29–23
Pts: Fred VanVleet 29; Rebs: Alperen Şengün 14; Asts: Fred VanVleet 8	Pts: Stephen Curry 29; Rebs: Jimmy Butler 9 Asts: Jimmy Butler 8
Series tied, 3–3

Chase Center, San Francisco, CA
Attendance: 18,064
Referees: James Capers, Mitchell Ervin, JB DeRosa

Fred VanVleet had 29 points, eight assists and eight rebounds, Alperen Şengün contributed 21 points and 14 rebounds, and the Houston Rockets kept their season alive once again by beating the Golden State Warriors, 115–107. The Warriors only trailed by two points entering the fourth quarter, but they went cold, missing 13 straight shots between Draymond Green's basket with 10:12 left and a 3-pointer by Stephen Curry at the 3:35 mark. Throughout the second half, the Warriors utilized the Hack-a-Shaq strategy on Steven Adams, resulting in 16 free throw attempts by Adams, of which he made 9.

TNT/TruTV

May 4
8:30 p.m. (7:30 p.m. CDT)

Recap

Golden State Warriors 103, Houston Rockets 89
Scoring by quarter: 23–19, 28–20, 19–23, 33–27
Pts: Buddy Hield 33; Rebs: Stephen Curry 10; Asts: Butler, Curry 7 each	Pts: Amen Thompson 24; Rebs: Alperen Şengün 14; Asts: Alperen Şengün 5
Golden State wins series, 4–3

Toyota Center, Houston, TX
Attendance: 18,055
Referees: Tony Brothers, James Williams, Kevin Scott

Led by Buddy Hield's 33 points, including a record-tying nine three-pointers, the Warriors prevented the Rockets from becoming the first team to overcome a 3–1 series deficit since the 2019–20 Denver Nuggets. Stephen Curry, who played in his second game seven in three years, added a double-double of 22 points and 10 rebounds, while also scoring 14 of his points in the fourth quarter. During the first half, Hield scored 22 points and six three-pointers, being 9 of 11 from 3-point range. Amen Thompson led the Rockets with 24 points, but Fred VanVleet was limited to 17 points on 6-of-13 shooting. With the victory, the Warriors become the second 7-seed in three seasons to eliminate a 2-seed in the first round, after the 2022–23 Los Angeles Lakers. They also remain undefeated in the playoffs over the Rockets, moving up to 5–0, with all series victories coming during Stephen Curry and Draymond Green's tenure with the team. Per ESPN, this is the 4th series in NBA history to go a full seven games, and have both teams score an identical number of points.

Regular-season series
Golden State won 3–2 in the regular-season series

November 2, 2024

Recap

Golden State Warriors 127, Houston Rockets 121 (OT)

Toyota Center, Houston, TX

December 5, 2024

Recap

Houston Rockets 93, Golden State Warriors 99

Chase Center, San Francisco, CA

December 11, 2024

Recap

Golden State Warriors 90, Houston Rockets 91

Toyota Center, Houston, TX

February 13, 2025

Recap

Golden State Warriors 105, Houston Rockets 98

Toyota Center, Houston, TX

April 6, 2025

Recap

Houston Rockets 106, Golden State Warriors 96

Chase Center, San Francisco, CA

This was the fifth playoff meeting between these two teams and the first since 2019, with the Warriors winning the first four meetings.

Previous playoff series
Golden State leads 4–0 in all-time playoff series

2015

Golden State Warriors 4, Houston Rockets 1

2015 Western Conference finals

2016

Golden State Warriors 4, Houston Rockets 1

2016 Western Conference first round

2018

Houston Rockets 3, Golden State Warriors 4

2018 Western Conference finals

2019

Golden State Warriors 4, Houston Rockets 2

2019 Western Conference semifinals

==== (3) Los Angeles Lakers vs. (6) Minnesota Timberwolves ====
ABC

April 19
8:30 p.m. (5:30 p.m. PDT)

Recap

Minnesota Timberwolves 117, Los Angeles Lakers 95
Scoring by quarter: 21–28, 38–20, 35–30, 23–17
Pts: Jaden McDaniels 25; Rebs: Jaden McDaniels 9 Asts: Anthony Edwards 9	Pts: Luka Dončić 37; Rebs: Luka Dončić 8 Asts: James, Reaves 3 each
Minnesota leads series, 1–0

Crypto.com Arena, Los Angeles, CA
Attendance: 18,997
Referees: Marc Davis, Tyler Ford, Brian Forte

The Timberwolves cruised to a win against the Lakers in the opening game of the series, dominating from the second quarter onwards. Anthony Edwards recorded a near-triple-double stat line of 22 points, 8 rebounds and 9 assists, despite making only 8 of his 22 field goal attempts. Jaden McDaniels added 25 points and 9 rebounds, while Naz Reid came off the bench to score 23 points on 6-of-9 3-point shooting. In his Lakers playoff debut, Luka Dončić carried the team with 37 points and 8 rebounds but finished with just one assist. None of his teammates scored above 20, although LeBron James came close with 19, along with 5 rebounds and 3 blocks, as the home team endured a night of bad shooting, going 33-of-83 overall.

TNT/TruTV

April 22
10:00 p.m. (7:00 p.m. PDT)

Recap

Minnesota Timberwolves 85, Los Angeles Lakers 94
Scoring by quarter: 15–34, 28–24, 22–23, 20–13
Pts: Julius Randle 27; Rebs: three players 6 each (Note: Conley, Edwards, and Gobert); Asts: Julius Randle 6	Pts: Luka Dončić 31; Rebs: Luka Dončić 12; Asts: Luka Dončić 9
Series tied, 1–1

Crypto.com Arena, Los Angeles, CA
Attendance: 18,997
Referees: James Capers, Ben Taylor, Justin Van Duyne

While the game got within single-digits in the fourth quarter, Los Angeles rode a 34–15 first quarter and never gave up the lead to tie the series on their home floor. Luka Dončić led Los Angeles in scoring with 31 points on 9-of-20 shooting with 12 rebounds and 9 assists, while LeBron James chipped in with 21 points, 11 rebounds, and 7 assists. Julius Randle led the Timberwolves in scoring with 27 points, while Anthony Edwards scored 25, including a poster dunk on Jaxson Hayes in the beginning of the third quarter. However, no other player on the Timberwolves reached double figures in scoring, with the team shooting just 20 percent from 3-point range, following their 21 made 3-pointers in Game 1.

ESPN

April 25
9:30 p.m. (8:30 p.m. CDT)

Recap

Los Angeles Lakers 104, Minnesota Timberwolves 116
Scoring by quarter: 26–32, 32–22, 26–32, 20–30
Pts: LeBron James 38; Rebs: LeBron James 10; Asts: Luka Dončić 8	Pts: Jaden McDaniels 30; Rebs: Anthony Edwards 8 Asts: Anthony Edwards 8
Minnesota leads series, 2–1

Target Center, Minneapolis, MN
Attendance: 19,312
Referees: Tony Brothers, Mark Lindsay, Gediminas Petraitis

After trailing by just four points at halftime, the Timberwolves outscored Lakers 62–46 in the second half, including a 13–1 run in the closing four-and-a-half minutes, to spoil a 38-point, 10-rebound performance from LeBron James. Jaden McDaniels led the Timberwolves with 30 points, while Anthony Edwards added 29, including a dagger 3-pointer to seal the Timberwolves' 2–1 series lead. For the Lakers, Austin Reaves scored 20 points and 7 rebounds, while Luka Dončić, who was reportedly sick, added 17 points, 7 rebounds and 8 assists.

ABC

April 27
3:30 p.m. (2:30 p.m. CDT)

Preview

Los Angeles Lakers 113, Minnesota Timberwolves 116
Scoring by quarter: 32–28, 26–33, 36–23, 19–32
Pts: Luka Dončić 38; Rebs: LeBron James 12; Asts: LeBron James 8	Pts: Anthony Edwards 43; Rebs: Jaden McDaniels 11; Asts: Anthony Edwards 6
Minnesota leads series, 3–1

Target Center, Minneapolis, MN
Attendance: 19,289
Referees: Josh Tiven, Mitchell Ervin, Sean Corbin

Jaden McDaniels converted a three-point play with 39.5 seconds left to take the lead and stole the ensuing inbounds pass from LeBron James, leading a late game rally by the Timberwolves for a 116–113 win over the Lakers that put them on the brink of advancing. Anthony Edwards, who had 43 points to lead Minnesota in scoring, drew a foul on James during a drive to the lane with 10 seconds left and hit both free throws to put them up three. On the last possession of the game, Austin Reaves missed a three that would have tied the game. LeBron James had 27 points and 12 rebounds for his 144th career double-double in the playoffs, surpassing Wilt Chamberlain for the third-most in history behind Tim Duncan (164) and Magic Johnson (157). James also went 15 for 18 from the free-throw line and had multiple excellent defensive stops in the fourth quarter, but did not score in the quarter, the first time he went scoreless in a fourth quarter since 2017. Luka Dončić bounced back from a stomach bug in Game 3, with 38 points on 13-for-28 shooting. Rui Hachimura played his best game of the series thus far with 23 points, while Austin Reaves scored all 16 of his points in the second half. Julius Randle added 25 points and McDaniels had 16 points and 11 rebounds for the Wolves, who trailed for much of the second half before the late game surge. The game was also notable for Lakers coach JJ Redick playing a five-man combo of Reaves, Dončić, Dorian Finney-Smith, James, and Hachimura the whole second half, the first coach in the play-by-play era to play five players for an entire half in the playoffs.

TNT/TruTV

April 30
10:00 p.m. (7:00 p.m. PDT)

Recap

Minnesota Timberwolves 103, Los Angeles Lakers 96
Scoring by quarter: 31–22, 28–27, 22–31, 22–16
Pts: Rudy Gobert 27; Rebs: Rudy Gobert 24; Asts: Anthony Edwards 8	Pts: Luka Dončić 28; Rebs: three players 7 each (Note: Dončić, James, and Vanderbilt); Asts: Luka Dončić 9
Minnesota wins series, 4–1

Crypto.com Arena, Los Angeles, CA
Attendance: 18,997
Referees: John Goble, James Williams, Ray Acosta

Minnesota completed the series upset over the Los Angeles Lakers, behind Rudy Gobert’s personal playoff highs with 27 points and 24 rebounds (9 offensive), against a center-less Lakers line-up. Minnesota won the game despite shooting 7-for-47 from three. This was the first time in franchise history the Lakers have lost in the first round when they were a 3-seed or better. Per OptaSTATS, just 16.9 percent of the Lakers' points in the series came in the fourth quarter (85-of-502), which was the lowest percentage by any team in any playoff series in NBA history.

Regular-season series
Series tied 2–2 in the regular-season series

October 22, 2024

Recap

Minnesota Timberwolves 103, Los Angeles Lakers 110

Crypto.com Arena, Los Angeles, CA

December 2, 2024

Recap

Los Angeles Lakers 80, Minnesota Timberwolves 109

Target Center, Minneapolis, MN

December 13, 2024

Recap

Los Angeles Lakers 87, Minnesota Timberwolves 97

Target Center, Minneapolis, MN

February 27, 2025

Recap

Minnesota Timberwolves 102, Los Angeles Lakers 111

Crypto.com Arena, Los Angeles, CA

This was the third playoff meeting between these two teams and the first since 2004, with the Lakers winning the first two meetings.

Previous playoff series
LA Lakers lead 2–0 in all-time playoff series

2003

Minnesota Timberwolves 2, Los Angeles Lakers 4

2003 Western Conference first round

2004

Minnesota Timberwolves 2, Los Angeles Lakers 4

2004 Western Conference finals

==== (4) Denver Nuggets vs. (5) Los Angeles Clippers ====
ESPN

April 19
3:30 p.m. (1:30 p.m. MDT)

Recap

Los Angeles Clippers 110, Denver Nuggets 112 (OT)
Scoring by quarter: 35–27, 18–22, 22–23, 23–26, Overtime: 12–14
Pts: James Harden 32; Rebs: Ivica Zubac 13; Asts: James Harden 11	Pts: Nikola Jokić 29; Rebs: Jokić, Murray 9 each Asts: Nikola Jokić 12
Denver leads series, 1–0

Ball Arena, Denver, CO
Attendance: 19,973
Referees: James Williams, Kevin Scott, Mark Lindsay

Falling into a 15-point deficit halfway through the second quarter, Denver rallied and ultimately prevailed in overtime in Game 1. Nikola Jokić once again showed his dominance, racking up 29 points, 9 rebounds and 12 assists, one rebound shy of a triple-double. Jamal Murray finished with 21 points, 9 rebounds and 7 assists, while Aaron Gordon added another 25 points, including 6 in overtime, and 8 rebounds. The Clippers had two players with a double-double, with James Harden scoring 32 and dishing out 11 assists, while Ivica Zubac logged 21 points and 13 rebounds. Kawhi Leonard contributed 22 points, but also had 7 turnovers. With 10 seconds left in overtime and the Nuggets up by 3, Clippers had an inbound opportunity, but Russell Westbrook made a key defensive play to force a turnover, sealing the victory over his former team.

TNT/TruTV

April 21
10:00 p.m. (8:00 p.m. MDT)

Recap

Los Angeles Clippers 105, Denver Nuggets 102
Scoring by quarter: 25–31, 30–21, 23–24, 27–26
Pts: Kawhi Leonard 39; Rebs: Ivica Zubac 12; Asts: James Harden 7	Pts: Nikola Jokić 26; Rebs: Michael Porter Jr. 15; Asts: Nikola Jokić 10
Series tied, 1–1

Ball Arena, Denver, CO
Attendance: 19,989
Referees: Marc Davis, Tyler Ford, Ed Malloy

Kawhi Leonard scored 39 points on 15-of-19 shooting as the Los Angeles Clippers evened their first-round playoff series against the Nuggets. It was another thrilling game that saw 18 lead changes and 12 ties. Despite the win, the Clippers saw no one, aside from Leonard, score over 20, with James Harden going just 7-of-17 on field goals, finishing with 18 points. Ivica Zubac notched another double-double, with 16 points and 12 rebounds. For the Nuggets, Nikola Jokić achieved his first triple-double of the 2025 playoffs, tallying 26 points, 12 rebounds and 10 assists (but also 7 turnovers). Jamal Murray added 23 points for the Nuggets, who also got a bounce-back game from Michael Porter Jr. (15 points and 15 rebounds) after his 3-point performance in Game 1.

NBA TV

April 24
10:00 p.m. (7:00 p.m. PDT)

Recap

Denver Nuggets 83, Los Angeles Clippers 117
Scoring by quarter: 28–35, 19–30, 23–25, 13–27
Pts: Jokić, Murray 23 each Rebs: Nikola Jokić 13; Asts: Nikola Jokić 13	Pts: Kawhi Leonard 21; Rebs: Kawhi Leonard 11; Asts: James Harden 9
LA Clippers lead series, 2–1

Intuit Dome, Inglewood, CA
Attendance: 17,927
Referees: James Capers, Ben Taylor, Ray Acosta

In Game 3, the Clippers had a 23–2 run that lasted through the first and second quarters, that helped them take a commanding lead and ultimately win the game. This run included a stretch where the Clippers made 14 of their 28 three-pointers. The Clippers win was a balanced effort, with Kawhi Leonard finishing with 21 points, 11 rebounds, and 6 assists; Norman Powell broke out of a mini-slump with 20 points on 7-of-12 shooting; Ivica Zubac scored 20 points to go along with 9 rebounds; James Harden had 19 points, 9 assists, and 6 rebounds; and Nicolas Batum provided 12 points off the bench with 4 three-point makes. In the defeat, Nikola Jokić had another playoff triple-double, with 23 points, 13 rebounds, and 13 assists on 9-of-14 shooting. Jamal Murray added 23 points on 8-of-15 shooting. This was the first playoff game at Intuit Dome.

TNT

April 26
6:00 p.m. (3:00 p.m. PDT)

Recap

Denver Nuggets 101, Los Angeles Clippers 99
Scoring by quarter: 27–22, 23–26, 35–17, 16–34
Pts: Nikola Jokić 36; Rebs: Nikola Jokić 21; Asts: Nikola Jokić 8	Pts: Kawhi Leonard 24; Rebs: Ivica Zubac 12; Asts: James Harden 11
Series tied, 2–2

Intuit Dome, Inglewood, CA
Attendance: 17,927
Referees: Zach Zarba, Sean Wright, Nick Buchert

The Nuggets evened the series at 2–2, behind 36 points, 21 rebounds, and 8 assists from Nikola Jokić and a game-winning, buzzer-beating dunk from Aaron Gordon. The Nuggets led the game by a slim two points at halftime, which eventually became a 85–65 lead entering the fourth quarter. The Clippers tried to erase a 22-point deficit, outscoring the Nuggets with a 32–9 run to take a 97–96 lead with one minute and eleven seconds left in regulation, with Bogdan Bogdanović's offensive rebound and basket. A three-point play from Jokić gave the Nuggets a 99–97 lead, before Ivica Zubac tied the game with exactly eight seconds remaining. Gordon dunked the missed three-pointer from Jokić to seal the victory; officials concluded that the ball came out of Gordon's hands before the red light came out, thus resulting in a Nuggets victory. According to the NBA, it was the first known game-winning buzzer-beater putback dunk in NBA playoff history.

Michael Porter Jr. and Christian Braun each scored 17 points for the Nuggets. Kawhi Leonard was the leading scorer for the Clippers with 24 points; Norman Powell added 22.

TNT/TruTV

April 29
10:00 p.m. (8:00 p.m. MDT)

Recap

Los Angeles Clippers 115, Denver Nuggets 131
Scoring by quarter: 23–35, 36–32, 24–32, 32–32
Pts: Ivica Zubac 27; Rebs: Kawhi Leonard 9 Asts: Kawhi Leonard 11	Pts: Jamal Murray 43; Rebs: Christian Braun 12; Asts: Nikola Jokić 12
Denver leads series, 3–2

Ball Arena, Denver, CO
Attendance: 20,005
Referees: Josh Tiven, Mitchell Ervin, Karl Lane

Jamal Murray exploded for 43 points on 17-of-26 shooting and 8-of-14 beyond the arc, as Denver took a 3–2 series lead at their home floor. Russell Westbrook returned after missing Game 4 with an injury and gave the team 21 points off the bench. Aaron Gordon provided 23 points, while Nikola Jokić notched his third triple-double of the series. As a team, the Nuggets shot 52 percent from three. Ivica Zubac scored 27 points on 11-of-15 shooting, a playoff career-high for the Clippers center. Kawhi Leonard scored 20 points, hauled 11 rebounds, and was one assist short of a triple-double. This was the Clippers first back-to-back losses since they lost three straight from March 2–5.

TNT/TruTV

May 1
10:00 p.m. (7:00 p.m. PDT)

Recap

Denver Nuggets 105, Los Angeles Clippers 111
Scoring by quarter: 28–25, 29–33, 22–32, 26–21
Pts: Nikola Jokić 25; Rebs: Russell Westbrook 10; Asts: Jokić, Murray 8 each	Pts: James Harden 28; Rebs: Kawhi Leonard 10; Asts: James Harden 8
Series tied, 3–3

Intuit Dome, Inglewood, CA
Attendance: 17,927
Referees: David Guthrie, Tyler Ford, Curtis Blair

A balanced effort from James Harden (28 points and eight assists), Kawhi Leonard (27 points and 10 rebounds) and Norman Powell (24 points, 11 in the third quarter) helped the Clippers force a pivotal Game 7. Los Angeles led by 15 with less than six minutes to play, but Denver made an 11–2 run to trim the Clippers’ lead to 107–101, but Russell Westbrook missed a layup and Powell buried a 3-pointer with 1:47 left to put the Clippers back up 9. Nicolas Batum would also continue his excellent series on defense with 3 steals and 2 blocks on Nikola Jokić. Leading the Nuggets was Jokić, who scored 20 of his 25 points in the first half, and Jamal Murray, who finished with 21 points, 8 rebounds, and 8 assists. The Nuggets are looking to atone for their Game 7 upset loss at home from last year's playoffs against the Timberwolves, while the Clippers are looking to avenge their Game 7 defeat by the Nuggets from the 2020 Western Conference semifinals.

TNT/TruTV

May 3
7:30 p.m. (5:30 p.m. MDT)

Recap

Los Angeles Clippers 101, Denver Nuggets 120
Scoring by quarter: 26–21, 21–37, 19–35, 35–27
Pts: Kawhi Leonard 22; Rebs: Ivica Zubac 14; Asts: James Harden 13	Pts: Aaron Gordon 22; Rebs: Nikola Jokić 10; Asts: Nikola Jokić 8
Denver wins series, 4–3

Ball Arena, Denver, CO
Attendance: 19,995
Referees: Marc Davis, Courtney Kirkland, Ben Taylor

A dominant 37–21 second quarter and a 35–19 third quarter was enough for the Nuggets to defeat the Clippers and advance to the Western Conference semifinals for the sixth time in seven seasons. The Nuggets led by as many as 35 and had six players in double figures in scoring (Murray, Braun, Porter Jr., Gordon, Jokić, and Westbrook); Westbrook also added 5 steals. Kawhi Leonard was the only Clipper to score over 20 points, as he scored 22 on 6-of-13 shooting. This was Tyronn Lue's first Game 7 loss as a head coach, after going 4–0 prior to this game. After winning 18 of their last 21 regular season games and two of the first three in this series, the Clippers lost three of their last four games.

Regular-season series
Series tied 2–2 in the regular-season series

October 26, 2024

Recap

Los Angeles Clippers 109, Denver Nuggets 104

Ball Arena, Denver, CO

December 1, 2024

Recap

Denver Nuggets 122, Los Angeles Clippers 126

Intuit Dome, Inglewood, CA

December 13, 2024

Recap

Los Angeles Clippers 98, Denver Nuggets 120

Ball Arena, Denver, CO

January 8, 2025

Recap

Los Angeles Clippers 103, Denver Nuggets 126

Ball Arena, Denver, CO

This was the third playoff meeting between these two teams and the first since 2020, with each team winning one series.

Previous playoff series
Series tied 1–1 in all-time playoff series

2006

Denver Nuggets 1, Los Angeles Clippers 4

2006 Western Conference first round

2020

Los Angeles Clippers 3, Denver Nuggets 4

2020 Western Conference semifinals

== Conference semifinals ==
Note: Times are EDT (UTC−4) as listed by the NBA. If the venue is located in a different time zone, the local time is also given.

=== Eastern Conference semifinals ===
==== (1) Cleveland Cavaliers vs. (4) Indiana Pacers ====
TNT/TruTV

May 4
6:00 p.m.

Recap

Indiana Pacers 121, Cleveland Cavaliers 112
Scoring by quarter: 36–25, 28–33, 28–32, 29–22
Pts: Andrew Nembhard 23; Rebs: Myles Turner 11; Asts: Tyrese Haliburton 13	Pts: Donovan Mitchell 33; Rebs: Evan Mobley 10; Asts: Ty Jerome 8
Indiana leads series, 1–0

Rocket Arena, Cleveland, OH
Attendance: 19,432
Referees: Zach Zarba, Sean Wright, Gediminas Petraitis

The Pacers stunned the top-seeded Cavaliers in Game 1, fighting off a late Cleveland rally to win 121–112. All five Indiana starters scored in double figures; Andrew Nembhard led the scoring with 23 points on 5-of-6 3-point shooting. Tyrese Haliburton notched a double-double with 22 points and 13 assists, along with 3 blocks. Aaron Nesmith and Pascal Siakam had 17 points apiece, while Myles Turner tallied 13 points and 11 rebounds. On the other hand, Donovan Mitchell led the Cavaliers with 33 points and broke Michael Jordan’s NBA playoff record with his eighth straight game of at least 30 points in a series opener, albeit making only 1 of his 11 3-point attempts. Evan Mobley, the newly crowned Defensive Player of the Year, added 20 points and 10 rebounds. Darius Garland remained absent for the third straight playoff game due to a sprained left big toe.

TNT/TruTV

May 6
7:00 p.m.

Recap

Indiana Pacers 120, Cleveland Cavaliers 119
Scoring by quarter: 15–32, 35–29, 34–37, 36–21
Pts: Nesmith, Turner 23 each Rebs: Tyrese Haliburton 9 Asts: Andrew Nembhard 13	Pts: Donovan Mitchell 48; Rebs: Jarrett Allen 12; Asts: Donovan Mitchell 9
Indiana leads series, 2–0

Rocket Arena, Cleveland, OH
Attendance: 19,432
Referees: Tony Brothers, David Guthrie, Nick Buchert

Despite trailing by 20 points in the 3rd quarter, the Pacers stormed back and won Game 2 on a game-winning three by Tyrese Haliburton, taking a 2–0 series lead. Indiana once again had six players score 10+ points, with 23 from Nesmith and Turner while Haliburton and Mathurin scored 19 each. Donovan Mitchell led the way for Cleveland in the absence of Darius Garland and Evan Mobley, scoring a playoff-high 48 points along with 9 assists. This was the second time this postseason the Pacers came back from 7 points or more with a minute or less in regulation. Coincidentally, this was also nearly the 30 year anniversary of Reggie Miller's 8 points in 9 seconds comeback against the Knicks in Game 1 of the ECSF in 1995.

ESPN

May 9
7:30 p.m.

Recap

Cleveland Cavaliers 126, Indiana Pacers 104
Scoring by quarter: 32–32, 34–13, 31–34, 29–25
Pts: Donovan Mitchell 43; Rebs: Evan Mobley 13; Asts: Max Strus 7	Pts: Bennedict Mathurin 23; Rebs: Aaron Nesmith 7 Asts: T. J. McConnell 7
Indiana leads series, 2–1

Gainbridge Fieldhouse, Indianapolis, IN
Attendance: 17,274
Referees: Marc Davis, Josh Tiven, Bill Kennedy

Donovan Mitchell became the first Cavs player since LeBron James in 2016 to score 40 points in back-to-back playoff games, as Cleveland got back in the series with a road blowout win over the Pacers in Game 3. Bennedict Mathurin led the Pacers with 23 points. Pascal Siakam had 18, and Tyrese Haliburton finished with just four points and five assists in his first career home loss in a postseason game he's appeared. Defensive Player of the Year Evan Mobley, All-Star guard Darius Garland, and key backup De'Andre Hunter all suited up for Cleveland after missing Game 2. Max Strus made four 3-pointers and finished with 20 points, seven rebounds, and seven assists. Three other Cleveland players also scored in double figures on a night the Cavs led by as much as 26, never trailed, and managed to protect their late lead when the Pacers cut the deficit to 11 early in the fourth.

TNT/TruTV

May 11
8:00 p.m.

Recap

Cleveland Cavaliers 109, Indiana Pacers 129
Scoring by quarter: 23–38, 16–42, 38–29, 32–20
Pts: Darius Garland 21; Rebs: Strus, Thompson 6 each Asts: Darius Garland 6	Pts: Pascal Siakam 21; Rebs: Myles Turner 7 Asts: T. J. McConnell 8
Indiana leads series, 3–1

Gainbridge Fieldhouse, Indianapolis, IN
Attendance: 17,274
Referees: John Goble, Kevin Scott, Curtis Blair

Indiana struck back with a dominant offensive performance, tying playoff records with a 41-point lead at halftime, and taking a commanding 3–1 series lead over Cleveland. Despite an early ejection from guard Bennedict Mathurin, the Pacers dominated the Cavaliers in the first half, shooting 60 percent from the field while holding Cleveland to 8 made shots; Indiana led 80–39 at the half, closing the half with a 19–2 run, culminating with Aaron Nesmith's buzzer-beating midrange jumper. Pascal Siakam led the scoring for the Pacers with 21 points on 9/10 shooting, while Myles Turner put up 20 points and 7 rebounds, while Obi Toppin added 20 points off the bench. Darius Garland led the Cavaliers with 21 points and 6 assists, while Donovan Mitchell exited after the first half with an apparent ankle injury during warm-ups. The Cavaliers' 70–49 second half was not enough to win, and they were now on the brink of elimination.

TNT/TruTV

May 13
7:00 p.m.

Recap

Indiana Pacers 114, Cleveland Cavaliers 105
Scoring by quarter: 19–31, 33–25, 33–20, 29–29
Pts: Tyrese Haliburton 31; Rebs: Aaron Nesmith 13; Asts: Tyrese Haliburton 8	Pts: Donovan Mitchell 35; Rebs: Evan Mobley 11; Asts: Darius Garland 3
Indiana wins series, 4–1

Rocket Arena, Cleveland, OH
Attendance: 19,432
Referees: James Capers, Ben Taylor, Mark Lindsay

The Pacers advanced to their second straight Conference Finals in an surprising upset series victory over the Cavaliers in five games. Tyrese Haliburton led the Pacers with 31 points, eight rebounds, and six assists, while Pascal Siakam added 25 in the road win. Donovan Mitchell, who played through a sprained ankle from Game 4, led the Cavaliers with 35 points in a losing effort, but shot only 8-for-25 from the floor. Evan Mobley tallied a double-double of 24 points and 11 rebounds.

The Cavaliers opened the game with a dominant 31–19 first quarter and led by as many as 19 points before the Pacers cut the lead to 56–52 at halftime, with Haliburton making all but one of his six three-pointers in the second quarter. The Pacers used a 17–2 run to take an 85–76 lead at the end of the third quarter, and never trailed in the fourth, while fending off a late rally from the Cavaliers and scoring eight of the game's final 10 points, to seal the comeback victory. The Cavaliers struggled to keep up, being 9-for-35 from the three-point range, with Mitchell and Darius Garland scoring only a combined 12 three-pointers on 41 attempted shots.

With the win, the Pacers advanced to back-to-back Conference Finals for the first time since 2013 and 2014. They also became the first team to reach consecutive Conference Finals series as a 4-seed or lower. For the first time since 2005, they won three games in a playoff series as the road team. For the first time in franchise history, the Cavaliers lost three home games in a playoff series. Notably, Cleveland went 0–5 at Rocket Arena against the Pacers throughout the regular season and playoffs, going 36–5 against every other opponent.

Regular-season series
Indiana won 3–1 in the regular-season series

January 12, 2025

Recap

Indiana Pacers 108, Cleveland Cavaliers 93

Rocket Arena, Cleveland, OH

January 14, 2025

Recap

Cleveland Cavaliers 127, Indiana Pacers 117

Gainbridge Fieldhouse, Indianapolis, IN

April 10, 2025

Recap

Cleveland Cavaliers 112, Indiana Pacers 114

Gainbridge Fieldhouse, Indianapolis, IN

April 13, 2025

Recap

Indiana Pacers 126, Cleveland Cavaliers 118 (2OT)

Rocket Arena, Cleveland, OH

This was the fourth playoff meeting between these two teams, with Cleveland winning two of the past three.

Previous playoff series
Cleveland leads 2–1 in all-time playoff series

1998

Indiana Pacers 3, Cleveland Cavaliers 1

1998 Eastern Conference First Round

2017

Cleveland Cavaliers 4, Indiana Pacers 0

2017 Eastern Conference First Round

2018

Cleveland Cavaliers 4, Indiana Pacers 3

2018 Eastern Conference First Round

==== (2) Boston Celtics vs. (3) New York Knicks ====
TNT/TruTV

May 5
7:00 p.m.

Recap

New York Knicks 108, Boston Celtics 105 (OT)
Scoring by quarter: 25–26, 20–35, 30–23, 25–16, Overtime: 8–5
Pts: Anunoby, Brunson 29 each Rebs: Karl-Anthony Towns 13; Asts: Mikal Bridges 7	Pts: Brown, Tatum 23 each Rebs: Jayson Tatum 16; Asts: Jayson Tatum 6
New York leads series, 1–0

TD Garden, Boston, MA
Attendance: 19,156
Referees: Marc Davis, Ben Taylor, JB DeRosa

After trailing by 20 points midway through the 3rd quarter, the Knicks would slowly rally from the deficit and re-take the lead in the 4th quarter. With the score tied 100–100, Jalen Brunson, who had previously hit two back-to-back 3s, missed a potential game-winning layup, which sent the game to overtime. In the OT, Mikal Bridges had 2 crucial steals, including the game-winning strip from Jaylen Brown to give New York a 108–105 victory and a 1–0 series lead. Brunson and OG Anunoby both scored 29 points, whereas Jayson Tatum and Jaylen Brown combined for 46 points, but shot 14–43 from the field, including 5–25 from 3-point range. The Celtics also set an NBA playoff record for the most missed 3-pointers in a single game with 45, shooting 15-60 from 3-point range overall.

TNT/TruTV

May 7
7:00 p.m.

Recap

New York Knicks 91, Boston Celtics 90
Scoring by quarter: 13–24, 28–26, 20–23, 30–17
Pts: Josh Hart 23; Rebs: Karl-Anthony Towns 17; Asts: Jalen Brunson 7	Pts: Brown, White 20 each Rebs: Jayson Tatum 14; Asts: three players 5 each (Note: Holiday, Tatum, and White)
New York leads series, 2–0

TD Garden, Boston, MA
Attendance: 19,156
Referees: James Capers, Kevin Scott, Mark Lindsay

The Knicks made history as the only team to come back from 20-point deficits in back-to-back playoff games, as they took a commanding 2–0 series lead in Game 2 over the Celtics. Jalen Brunson only scored 17 points for New York, but made two free throws with 12.7 seconds left to give his team the 91–90 lead. On the last possession of the game, Jayson Tatum then couldn't get to the rim, and Mikal Bridges helped off his man that he was guarding, reached in to bat the ball away, and recovered it, securing his second game-ending steal in as many games. Bridges also scored all of his 14 points in the fourth quarter. Josh Hart had 23 points and Karl-Anthony Towns finished with 21 points and 17 rebounds for the Knicks. The Celtics, who led by 20 points multiple times in the game, had another off night shooting the three, going 10-for-40. Jaylen Brown and Derrick White scored 20 points apiece, while star forward Jayson Tatum was limited to 13 points on 5-for-19 shooting for the Celtics. Kristaps Porziņģis did not start after sitting out the second half of Game 1 with an illness. He came off the bench for just the fifth time in his NBA career and finished with eight points and four rebounds in 14 minutes. In the fourth quarter, the Celtics went eight minutes without a field goal made. The Knicks improved to 5–0 on the road in these playoffs, with each of their wins coming by 3 points or less.

ABC

May 10
3:30 p.m.

Recap

Boston Celtics 115, New York Knicks 93
Scoring by quarter: 36–20, 35–26, 25–24, 19–23
Pts: Payton Pritchard 23; Rebs: Horford, Tatum 9 each Asts: Jayson Tatum 7	Pts: Jalen Brunson 27; Rebs: Karl-Anthony Towns 15; Asts: Jalen Brunson 7
New York leads series, 2–1

Madison Square Garden, New York, NY
Attendance: 19,812
Referees: Zach Zarba, Courtney Kirkland, Justin Van Duyne

In the most expensive Knicks playoff game in Madison Square Garden history, the Celtics managed to avoid a 3–0 deficit on the road with a 115–93 rout of the Knicks, never trailing and dominating the game throughout all four quarters, leading by as many as 31 points. The Celtics started off the first quarter 36–20 and never looked back, as they had their first efficient game from beyond the arc in the series (50 percent, 20-40 shooting). Payton Pritchard led Boston with 23 points to lead Boston in scoring, and Jalen Brunson led New York with 27 points and 7 assists. Karl-Anthony Towns had a double-double of 21 points and 15 rebounds, but had an inefficient shooting just 5–18 from the field. With this loss, this also resulted in home teams in the Eastern Conference semifinals having a 0–6 record at home thus far.

ESPN

May 12
7:30 p.m.

Recap

Boston Celtics 113, New York Knicks 121
Scoring by quarter: 39–28, 23–23, 23–37, 28–33
Pts: Jayson Tatum 42; Rebs: Jayson Tatum 8 Asts: Horford, Tatum 4 each	Pts: Jalen Brunson 39; Rebs: Karl-Anthony Towns 11; Asts: Jalen Brunson 12
New York leads series, 3–1

Madison Square Garden, New York, NY
Attendance: 19,812
Referees: Scott Foster, James Williams, Mitchell Ervin

Following a rough Game 3, the Knicks broke their losing streak against the Celtics in Madison Square Garden, as they rallied for a 121–113 win. Despite the Knicks trailing by 14 in the third quarter, Jalen Brunson scored 18 of his 39 points in the third to retake the lead. After struggling in Game 3, the trio of Mikal Bridges, Karl-Anthony Towns and OG Anunoby combined for 66 points. The Knicks also trailed by 11 at halftime, as they outscored Boston 70–51 in the second half, including a 37–23 run in the third quarter. In the losing effort, Jayson Tatum had 42 points with 7 made 3-pointers, but would leave the game with 3 minutes remaining with a severe non-contact injury. Forced to take Tatum out, Boston head coach Joe Mazzulla used his final timeout, sealing the Knicks' victory. A day later, an MRI revealed that Tatum had suffered an Achilles tendon rupture, effectively ending his season and putting question into his availability for the 2025–26 season.

TNT/TruTV

May 14
7:00 p.m.

Recap

New York Knicks 102, Boston Celtics 127
Scoring by quarter: 32–30, 27–29, 17–32, 26–36
Pts: Josh Hart 24; Rebs: Mitchell Robinson 13; Asts: Jalen Brunson 6	Pts: Derrick White 34; Rebs: Luke Kornet 9 Asts: Jaylen Brown 12
New York leads series, 3–2

TD Garden, Boston, MA
Attendance: 19,156
Referees: Tony Brothers, Josh Tiven, Brian Forte

The Celtics connected on 22 3-pointers to post their first home victory of the series as they keep their season alive in a 127–102 rout. Derrick White had 34 points, including seven 3-pointers, Jaylen Brown added 26 points and 12 assists, and Payton Pritchard scored 17 points and five 3-pointers. Luke Kornet finished with 10 points, nine rebounds and seven blocks. Kornet started the second half for Kristaps Porzingis, who played just 12 minutes. Josh Hart led the Knicks with 24 points despite briefly leaving the game late in the first quarter to close a bloody gash over his eye after he took an inadvertent elbow. Jalen Brunson added 22 points before fouling out with 7:19 to play in the game.

ESPN

May 16
8:00 p.m.

Recap

Boston Celtics 81, New York Knicks 119
Scoring by quarter: 20–26, 17–38, 20–28, 24–27
Pts: Jaylen Brown 20; Rebs: Jaylen Brown 6 Asts: Jaylen Brown 6	Pts: Anunoby, Brunson 23 each Rebs: Karl-Anthony Towns 12; Asts: Josh Hart 11
New York wins series, 4–2

Madison Square Garden, New York, NY
Attendance: 19,812
Referees: James Capers, Tyler Ford, Ed Malloy

Back at Madison Square Garden, the Knicks blew out the Celtics to clinch their first Eastern Conference Finals appearance in 25 years. The Knicks set the tone early, expanding their lead to 27 at halftime, and increasing it to as much as 41 in the 3rd quarter. Jaylen Brown led the way for Boston with 20 points, but fouled out in the 3rd quarter, also finishing with 7 turnovers. For the Knicks, 4 players scored over 20 points (Jalen Brunson, Mikal Bridges, OG Anunoby and Karl-Anthony Towns) in the 119–81 win; Josh Hart also had the Knicks third ever playoff triple-double and first since 1972. It was the Knicks first time clinching a playoff series at home since the 1999 Eastern Conference Finals. With Boston's loss, and the Nuggets' loss to the Thunder in Game 7 just a few days later, this would mark the 7th straight NBA season with a unique champion, and the 6th straight year in which the defending champions failed to advance past the conference semifinals.

Regular-season series
Boston won 4–0 in the regular-season series

October 22, 2024

Recap

New York Knicks 109, Boston Celtics 132

TD Garden, Boston, MA

February 8, 2025

Recap

Boston Celtics 131, New York Knicks 104

Madison Square Garden, New York, NY

February 23, 2025

Recap

New York Knicks 105, Boston Celtics 118

TD Garden, Boston, MA

April 8, 2025

Recap

Boston Celtics 119, New York Knicks 117 (OT)

Madison Square Garden, New York, NY

This was the 16th playoff meeting between these two teams, with the Celtics winning eight of the first 15 meetings.

Previous playoff series
Boston leads 8–7 in all-time playoff series

1951

Boston Celtics 0, New York Knicks 2

1951 Eastern Division Semifinals

1952

Boston Celtics 1, New York Knicks 2

1952 Eastern Division Semifinals

1953

New York Knicks 3, Boston Celtics 1

1953 Eastern Division Finals

1954

New York Knicks 0, Boston Celtics 2

1954 Eastern Division Round Robin Semifinals

1955

New York Knicks 1, Boston Celtics 2

1955 Eastern Division Semifinals

1967

Boston Celtics 3, New York Knicks 1

1967 Eastern Division Semifinals

1969

New York Knicks 2, Boston Celtics 4

1969 Eastern Division Finals

1972

Boston Celtics 1, New York Knicks 4

1972 Eastern Conference Finals

1973

Boston Celtics 3, New York Knicks 4

1973 Eastern Conference Finals

1974

Boston Celtics 4, New York Knicks 1

1974 Eastern Conference Finals

1984

Boston Celtics 4, New York Knicks 3

1984 Eastern Conference Semifinals

1988

Boston Celtics 3, New York Knicks 1

1988 Eastern Conference First Round

1990

Boston Celtics 2, New York Knicks 3

1990 Eastern Conference First Round

2011

Boston Celtics 4, New York Knicks 0

2011 Eastern Conference First Round

2013

New York Knicks 4, Boston Celtics 2

2013 Eastern Conference First Round

=== Western Conference semifinals ===
==== (1) Oklahoma City Thunder vs. (4) Denver Nuggets ====
TNT/TruTV

May 5
9:30 p.m. (8:30 p.m. CDT)

Recap

Denver Nuggets 121, Oklahoma City Thunder 119
Scoring by quarter: 26–27, 24–33, 35–30, 36–29
Pts: Nikola Jokić 42; Rebs: Nikola Jokić 22; Asts: Jokić, Murray 6 each	Pts: Shai Gilgeous-Alexander 33; Rebs: Shai Gilgeous-Alexander 10; Asts: Shai Gilgeous-Alexander 8
Denver leads series, 1–0

Paycom Center, Oklahoma City, OK
Attendance: 18,203
Referees: John Goble, Josh Tiven, Karl Lane

After spending the vast majority of the second half trailing, the Nuggets orchestrated a massive comeback to win 121–119, stealing homecourt advantage from the Thunder. MVP candidate Nikola Jokić was once again dominant, dropping an all-rounded stat line of 42 points, 22 rebounds, 6 assists and 2 blocks. Aaron Gordon finished with 22 points and 14 rebounds. Jamal Murray added 21 points and 6 assists, Christian Braun had 11 points and 13 boards, and former Thunder player Russell Westbrook contributed 18 points off the bench. In total, the Nuggets had 72 rebounds, the third most in a playoff game since the ABA–NBA merger. For the top-seeded Thunder, Shai Gilgeous-Alexander recorded 33 points, 10 rebounds and 8 assists, finishing 2 assists shy of a triple-double. Alex Caruso, as a substitute, shot 5-of-9 from beyond the arc en route to 20 points. None of the other Thunder players scored above 20. With the Thunder up by 1 with 10 seconds remaining, Chet Holmgren was awarded 2 free throws, but he missed both; Braun took the rebound and after a cross-court pass from Westbrook, Gordon proved to be Denver's hero by scoring the game-winning three-pointer with 4 seconds left on the clock.

TNT/TruTV

May 7
9:30 p.m. (8:30 p.m. CDT)

Recap

Denver Nuggets 106, Oklahoma City Thunder 149
Scoring by quarter: 21–45, 35–42, 20–37, 30–25
Pts: Russell Westbrook 19; Rebs: Nikola Jokić 8 Asts: Nikola Jokić 6	Pts: Shai Gilgeous-Alexander 34; Rebs: Chet Holmgren 11; Asts: Shai Gilgeous-Alexander 8
Series tied, 1–1

Paycom Center, Oklahoma City, OK
Attendance: 18,203
Referees: Scott Foster, James Williams, Ed Malloy

Shai Gilgeous-Alexander scored 34 points in three quarters, and the Oklahoma City Thunder set league and team records in a 149–106 rout over the Denver Nuggets to tie the series at 1–1. Oklahoma City set an NBA playoff record for first-half points with 87, surpassing the 86 scored by the Cleveland Cavaliers against the Golden State Warriors in Game 4 of the NBA Finals on June 9, 2017. The 149 points were also the most Oklahoma City ever scored in a playoff game. Gilgeous-Alexander made 11-of-13 field goals, all 11 of his free throws, and had eight assists. He led eight players who scored in double figures. Nikola Jokić could not replicate his dominant performance in Game 1, tallying just 17 points and 8 rebounds before fouling out late in the third quarter.

ESPN

May 9
10:00 p.m. (8:00 p.m. MDT)

Recap

Oklahoma City Thunder 104, Denver Nuggets 113 (OT)
Scoring by quarter: 28–22, 28–29, 27–29, 19–22, Overtime: 2–11
Pts: Jalen Williams 32; Rebs: Chet Holmgren 16; Asts: Shai Gilgeous-Alexander 7	Pts: Jamal Murray 27; Rebs: Nikola Jokić 16; Asts: Jamal Murray 8
Denver leads series, 2–1

Ball Arena, Denver, CO
Attendance: 19,993
Referees: James Capers, Ben Taylor, Ray Acosta

The Nuggets dominated in overtime to take a 2–1 series lead, while also limiting the Thunder to just two points in that period. Jamal Murray led the Nuggets with 27 points, while Aaron Gordon and Michael Porter Jr. added 22 and 21, respectively, while also overcoming an off-night for Nikola Jokic, who scored 20 points, 16 rebounds, and 6 assists, but missed 17 of his 25 field goals and all 10 three-point attempts, including a potential game winner. Jalen Williams scored a game-high 32 points for the Thunder, who came on the road after their 43-point blowout victory in Game 2. Chet Holmgren added 18 points in a losing effort. Shai Gilgeous-Alexander also scored 18, but struggled throughout the game, missing 15 of his 22 shots, and also missed a potential game-winner that would have given the Thunder a 2–1 series lead.

ABC

May 11
3:30 p.m. (1:30 p.m. MDT)

Recap

Oklahoma City Thunder 92, Denver Nuggets 87
Scoring by quarter: 17–8, 25–28, 21–33, 29–18
Pts: Shai Gilgeous-Alexander 25; Rebs: Isaiah Hartenstein 14; Asts: Shai Gilgeous-Alexander 6	Pts: Nikola Jokić 27; Rebs: Aaron Gordon 16; Asts: Aaron Gordon 6
Series tied, 2–2

Ball Arena, Denver, CO
Attendance: 19,995
Referees: Tony Brothers, Tyler Ford, Sean Wright

Shai Gilgeous-Alexander scored nine of his 25 points in the fourth quarter, pulling the top-seeded Thunder from the brink of a 3–1 deficit against Denver in another close game. About 36 hours after an exhausting overtime Game 3 Friday night, the early Mother’s Day tip-off produced an ugly first half that featured a combined 25 points in the first quarter and ended with Oklahoma City up 42–36 at halftime. Down by eight points early in the fourth quarter, the Thunder used an 11–0 run fueled by reserves Cason Wallace, who had a pair of 3-pointers, and Aaron Wiggins, who added another, to wrest control; Wallace's second 3-pointer put Oklahoma City ahead for good at 75–73 with 8:35 left in the game. Nikola Jokić had 27 points and 13 rebounds, but his three assists were a low for this playoff run, and his 4 turnovers gave him 22 assists against 23 turnovers in this second-round series. Aaron Gordon added 15 points and 16 rebounds, but also had 4 turnovers.

TNT/TruTV

May 13
9:30 p.m. (8:30 p.m. CDT)

Recap

Denver Nuggets 105, Oklahoma City Thunder 112
Scoring by quarter: 28–27, 28–27, 30–24, 19–34
Pts: Nikola Jokić 44; Rebs: Nikola Jokić 15; Asts: Nikola Jokić 5	Pts: Shai Gilgeous-Alexander 31; Rebs: Jalen Williams 9 Asts: Shai Gilgeous-Alexander 7
Oklahoma City leads series, 3–2

Paycom Center, Oklahoma City, OK
Attendance: 18,203
Referees: Zach Zarba, David Guthrie, Curtis Blair

Oklahoma City overcame a 44-point, 15-rebound night from Denver's star Nikola Jokić and a 9-point deficit in the middle of the fourth quarter to take a 3–2 lead on their homecourt. Shai Gilgeous-Alexander made 12 of 23 field goals and bounced back from a slow start to lead six players in double figures. One of those six players was Luguentz Dort, who scored three total points in the first three quarters, but hit a trio of 3-pointers in a two-minute span to cut Denver's lead to 92–90 midway through the fourth. Jamal Murray scored 28 points, but he made just 10 of 27 shots. No other Denver player scored more than 13 points.

ESPN

May 15
8:30 p.m. (6:30 p.m. MDT)

Recap

Oklahoma City Thunder 107, Denver Nuggets 119
Scoring by quarter: 28–31, 33–27, 21–32, 25–29
Pts: Shai Gilgeous-Alexander 32; Rebs: Chet Holmgren 11; Asts: Jalen Williams 10	Pts: Nikola Jokić 29; Rebs: Nikola Jokić 14; Asts: Nikola Jokić 8
Series tied, 3–3

Ball Arena, Denver, CO
Attendance: 19,998
Referees: Marc Davis, Kevin Scott, Mitchell Ervin

Denver played their best full game of the series in a 119–107 victory to force a Game 7. Nikola Jokić scored 29 points, 14 rebounds, and 8 assists. A sick Jamal Murray, who was listed as “questionable” for the game, added 25 points, and Christian Braun had a career playoff-best 23 points. The game was tied deep into the third quarter when Julian Strawther had a pair of threes and a driving layup to gain the momentum during a 10–0 run. Strawther finished with 15 points, all coming in the second half. Shai Gilgeous-Alexander scored 32 points on 11-for-16 shooting and Chet Holmgren scored 19 points and had 11 rebounds. Denver made their third quarter run when Gilgeous-Alexander was on the bench with foul trouble. Jalen Williams dished out 10 assists, but again struggled with his shot, going 3-for-19 for 6 points, including missing a wide open three that would have gotten Oklahoma City within two possessions with 1:35 left in the game. In the series thus far vs. Denver, Williams is shooting just 33 percent from the floor and 21 percent on 3-pointers.

The Nuggets go into Game 7 with years worth of experience, as this is their seventh Game 7 since 2019; however, this is their first on the road since their 2012 defeat to the Lakers. The Thunder have not played in a Game 7 since losing to the Rockets in the first round in 2020. The only two players left from that 2020 Game 7 are Shai Gilgeous-Alexander and Luguentz Dort.

ABC

May 18
3:30 p.m. (2:30 p.m. CDT)

Recap

Denver Nuggets 93, Oklahoma City Thunder 125
Scoring by quarter: 26–21, 20–39, 26–37, 21–28
Pts: Nikola Jokić 20; Rebs: Aaron Gordon 11; Asts: Nikola Jokić 7	Pts: Shai Gilgeous-Alexander 35; Rebs: Chet Holmgren 11; Asts: Jalen Williams 7
Oklahoma City wins series, 4–3

Paycom Center, Oklahoma City, OK
Attendance: 18,203
Referees: Scott Foster, Josh Tiven, James Williams

After a competitive first half, Oklahoma City routed Denver in the second half to advance to their first Western Conference Finals since 2016. Shai Gilgeous-Alexander scored 35 points on 12-of-19 shooting, while Jalen Williams broke out of his series-long slump with 24 points on 10-of-17 shooting. Off the bench, Alex Caruso and Cason Wallace were a +40 and +38, respectively. Caruso particularly played excellent defense on the much taller and bigger Nikola Jokić. Denver came into the game battered with Aaron Gordon hampered due to a Grade 2 hamstring injury and Michael Porter's shoulder injury. Jokić was able to score 20 points, but only took 9 shots and had 5 turnovers. As a team, the Nuggets shot 39 percent from the floor and 22 percent from three, compared to the Thunder, who made 49 percent of the shots from the floor and shot 30 percent from three.

Regular-season series
Tied 2–2 in the regular-season series

October 24, 2024

Recap

Oklahoma City Thunder 102, Denver Nuggets 87

Ball Arena, Denver, CO

November 6, 2024

Recap

Oklahoma City Thunder 122, Denver Nuggets 124

Ball Arena, Denver, CO

March 9, 2025

Recap

Denver Nuggets 103, Oklahoma City Thunder 127

Paycom Center, Oklahoma City, OK

March 10, 2025

Recap

Denver Nuggets 140, Oklahoma City Thunder 127

Paycom Center, Oklahoma City, OK

This was the fifth playoff meeting between these two teams, with each team winning two of the past four; the first three series were played when the Thunder were the Seattle SuperSonics.

Previous playoff series
Tied 2–2 in all-time playoff series

1978

Denver Nuggets 2, Seattle SuperSonics 4

1978 Western Conference Finals

1988

Denver Nuggets 3, Seattle SuperSonics 2

1988 Western Conference First Round

1994

Seattle SuperSonics 2, Denver Nuggets 3

1994 Western Conference First Round

2011

Oklahoma City Thunder 4, Denver Nuggets 1

2011 Western Conference First Round

==== (6) Minnesota Timberwolves vs. (7) Golden State Warriors ====
TNT/TruTV

May 6
9:30 p.m. (8:30 p.m. CDT)

Recap

Golden State Warriors 99, Minnesota Timberwolves 88
Scoring by quarter: 18–20, 26–11, 36–29, 19–28
Pts: Buddy Hield 24; Rebs: Jimmy Butler 11; Asts: Jimmy Butler 8	Pts: Anthony Edwards 23; Rebs: Anthony Edwards 14; Asts: Julius Randle 6
Golden State leads series, 1–0

Target Center, Minneapolis, MN
Attendance: 19,223
Referees: Zach Zarba, Bill Kennedy, Sean Corbin

With Stephen Curry sidelined for most of the game with a hamstring injury, Jimmy Butler and Buddy Hield led the Warriors past the Timberwolves in Game 1. Hield picked up where he left off in the Game 7 win at Houston that finished the first round by scoring 24 points on 5-for-8 shooting from 3-point range. Jimmy Butler had 20 points, 11 rebounds, and eight assists and Draymond Green had four first-half 3s on his way to 18 points, as Steve Kerr used 12 players in the game. Anthony Edwards had 23 points and 14 rebounds after the rough start, finishing 9-for-22 from the floor. Naz Reid had 19 points and Julius Randle added 16 points for the Wolves. Minnesota finished 5-for-29 from behind the arc and trailed by 23 points late in the third.

TNT/TruTV

May 8
8:30 p.m. (7:30 p.m. CDT)

Recap

Golden State Warriors 93, Minnesota Timberwolves 117
Scoring by quarter: 15–29, 24–27, 26–29, 28–32
Pts: Jonathan Kuminga 18; Rebs: Jimmy Butler 7 Asts: Brandin Podziemski 6	Pts: Julius Randle 24; Rebs: Edwards, Gobert 9 each Asts: Julius Randle 11
Series tied, 1–1

Target Center, Minneapolis, MN
Attendance: 18,978
Referees: Tony Brothers, Tyler Ford, Brian Forte

The Timberwolves, while never trailing in the game, bounced back after their tough Game 1 loss with a 24-point blowout victory to tie the series at 1–1. Minnesota also scored the first 13 points of the game, starting strong with a 29–15 1st quarter. Julius Randle led the Timberwolves with a double-double of 24 points and 11 assists, while Anthony Edwards added 20 in the victory. The Warriors were without Stephen Curry, who was sidelined due to a left hamstring strain. Despite the Warriors cutting the lead to 7 in the third quarter, they never came close again as Minnesota quickly regained momentum.

ABC

May 10
8:30 p.m. (5:30 p.m. PDT)

Recap

Minnesota Timberwolves 102, Golden State Warriors 97
Scoring by quarter: 21–21, 19–21, 29–31, 33–24
Pts: Anthony Edwards 36; Rebs: Rudy Gobert 13; Asts: Julius Randle 12	Pts: Jimmy Butler 33; Rebs: Brandin Podziemski 8 Asts: Jimmy Butler 7
Minnesota leads series, 2–1

Chase Center, San Francisco, CA
Attendance: 18,064
Referees: Scott Foster, David Guthrie, Mitchell Ervin

Anthony Edwards's 36 points, a triple-double from Julius Randle (24 points, 12 assists and 10 rebounds), and a 33–24 fourth quarter propelled the Timberwolves to a 2–1 series lead over the Warriors. Still without Stephen Curry, the Warriors missed all of their five three-point attempts during the first half, but led 42–40 at halftime. Jimmy Butler led the Warriors with 33 points, while Jonathan Kuminga scored all of his 30 points off the bench. Trayce Jackson-Davis was promoted as a starter for the game, though scoring only 11 points. Draymond Green was fouled out with 4:38 remaining, while attempting to block a shot by Jaden McDaniels.

ESPN

May 12
10:00 p.m. (7:00 p.m. PDT)

Recap

Minnesota Timberwolves 117, Golden State Warriors 110
Scoring by quarter: 27–28, 31–32, 39–17, 20–33
Pts: Julius Randle 31; Rebs: Jaden McDaniels 13; Asts: Conley, Edwards 5 each	Pts: Jonathan Kuminga 23; Rebs: Kevon Looney 8 Asts: Butler, Moody 3 each
Minnesota leads series, 3–1

Chase Center, San Francisco, CA
Attendance: 18,064
Referees: Marc Davis, Courtney Kirkland, Pat Fraher

The Timberwolves dominated the game once again in the second half, outscoring the Warriors 39–17 and making a 17–0 run in the third quarter, to take a commanding 3–1 series lead for the second straight series. Julius Randle and Anthony Edwards both led the Timberwolves with 31 and 30 points, respectively. Jonathan Kuminga came off the bench once again and followed up his 30-point Game 3 performance by scoring 23 points in a losing effort, while Jimmy Butler, Draymond Green, and Buddy Hield were all limited to 41 points total. With the win, the Timberwolves are one win away from their second consecutive and third overall Conference Finals appearance. Meanwhile, the Warriors face a 3–1 series deficit after leading 3–1 in the first round against the Houston Rockets, and are on the brink of elimination.

TNT/TruTV

May 14
9:30 p.m. (8:30 p.m. CDT)

Recap

Golden State Warriors 110, Minnesota Timberwolves 121
Scoring by quarter: 23–30, 24–32, 25–31, 38–28
Pts: Brandin Podziemski 28; Rebs: three players 6 each (Note: Butler, Green, and Podziemski); Asts: Butler, Green 6 each	Pts: Julius Randle 29; Rebs: Gobert, Randle 8 each Asts: Anthony Edwards 12
Minnesota wins series, 4–1

Target Center, Minneapolis, MN
Attendance: 19,395
Referees: John Goble, James Williams, Sean Wright

Julius Randle continued his excellent form this series, scoring 29 points on 13-for-18 shooting, as the Timberwolves punched their ticket to the Western Conference Finals for the second year in a row. Anthony Edwards added 22 points and a career playoff high 12 assists, with the other Timberwolves starters (Rudy Gobert, Mike Conley, and Jaden McDaniels) all finishing in double figures, as well as Donte DiVincenzo off the bench. Brandin Podziemski had a playoff career-high 28 points for the Warriors, while Jonathan Kuminga provided 26 points off the bench in 29 minutes. Including regular season and playoffs, the Timberwolves have won 26 of their last 31 games. For the third time in their history, the Timberwolves advanced to the conference finals; Minnesota has also never lost a series in the second round.

Regular-season series
Golden State won 3–1 in the regular-season series

December 6, 2024

Recap

Minnesota Timberwolves 107, Golden State Warriors 90

Chase Center, San Francisco, CA

December 8, 2024

Recap

Minnesota Timberwolves 106, Golden State Warriors 114

Chase Center, San Francisco, CA

December 21, 2024

Recap

Golden State Warriors 113, Minnesota Timberwolves 103

Target Center, Minneapolis, MN

January 15, 2025

Recap

Golden State Warriors 116, Minnesota Timberwolves 115

Target Center, Minneapolis, MN

This was the first playoff meeting between these two teams.

== Conference finals ==
Note: Times are EDT (UTC−4) as listed by the NBA. If the venue is located in a different time zone, the local time is also given.

=== Eastern Conference finals ===
==== (3) New York Knicks vs. (4) Indiana Pacers ====
TNT/TruTV

May 21
8:00 pm

Recap

Indiana Pacers 138, New York Knicks 135 (OT)
Scoring by quarter: 34–36, 28–33, 25–21, 38–35, Overtime: 13–10
Pts: Tyrese Haliburton 31; Rebs: Obi Toppin 10; Asts: Tyrese Haliburton 11	Pts: Jalen Brunson 43; Rebs: Josh Hart 13; Asts: Josh Hart 7
Indiana leads series, 1–0

Madison Square Garden, New York, NY
Attendance: 19,812
Referees: Zach Zarba, Ben Taylor, Mitchell Ervin

The Pacers orchestrated their third improbable comeback this playoffs, with a stunning 138–135 comeback win against the Knicks in Game 1. The Knicks led by 14 points with 2:51 minutes left, but Aaron Nesmith kept the Pacers in the game with a flurry of 3-pointers, becoming the first player in NBA history to make six 3-pointers in the fourth quarter of a playoff game. Still with a slim lead, Karl-Anthony Towns and OG Anunoby proceeded to go 1-for-2 each at the free throw line with less than 15 seconds left. After Anunoby's free throw make with 7.1 seconds left to put the Knicks up two, Tyrese Haliburton dribbled the ball up the court, attacked the rim, dribbled back out toward the 3-point line and fired up a jumper over Mitchell Robinson. The ball bounced high above the shot clock and went in. Haliburton did a choke signal towards the crowd, harking back to Pacers Hall of Famer Reggie Miller's choke sign in Game 5 of the 1994 Eastern Conference Finals (Miller was also in attendance at the game for TNT doing color commentary). While the Pacers rushed towards Haliburton in celebration thinking they had won the game, officials reviewed the last play and Haliburton's foot was on the 3-point line, which took the game to overtime; the Pacers outscored the Knicks 20–6 from 2:51 in the fourth quarter until the end of regulation.

In overtime, the Pacers held a slight three-point edge with 10.1 seconds left; Brunson and Towns missed threes that would have tied the game, thus giving Indiana the win. Haliburton (31 points, 11 assists) and Nesmith (30 points, 8-for-9 from three) starred in the Pacers victory. The Knicks, who had a 99.7 percent chance of winning the game deep in the fourth quarter, were led by Brunson (45 points, 15-for-25 from the floor) and Towns (35 points, 11-for-17 from the floor, 12 rebounds).

TNT/TruTV

May 23
8:00 pm

Recap

Indiana Pacers 114, New York Knicks 109
Scoring by quarter: 24–26, 25–26, 32–29, 33–28
Pts: Pascal Siakam 39; Rebs: Tyrese Haliburton 8 Asts: Tyrese Haliburton 11	Pts: Jalen Brunson 36; Rebs: Mitchell Robinson 9 Asts: Jalen Brunson 11
Indiana leads series, 2–0

Madison Square Garden, New York, NY
Attendance: 19,812
Referees: James Capers, Marc Davis, Kevin Scott

Following an unbelievable comeback by the Pacers the previous game, neither team led by more than 10 points in Game 2. However, a big performance by Pascal Siakam, who finished with 39 points on 15-23 shooting, including 16 in the 1st quarter, was the difference in the game. Despite Tyrese Haliburton contributing just 14 points on 5-16 shooting, he finished with a near triple-double with 8 rebounds and 11 assists. For New York, Jalen Brunson led the way with 36 points and 11 assists, but missed a potential game-tying 3-pointer as the Knicks failed to complete a late rally. Karl-Anthony Towns finished with 20 points and 7 rebounds, but was a team-low -20 in plus-minus and sat most of the fourth quarter. With this win, Indiana also took a 2–0 series lead on the road for the 2nd straight series, improving their road record to 6–1. Meanwhile, the Knicks dropped to a 3–5 record at Madison Square Garden in 2025 playoffs.

TNT/TruTV

May 25
8:00 pm

Recap

New York Knicks 106, Indiana Pacers 100
Scoring by quarter: 26–30, 19–28, 25–22, 36–20
Pts: Karl-Anthony Towns 24; Rebs: Karl-Anthony Towns 15; Asts: Josh Hart 4	Pts: Tyrese Haliburton 20; Rebs: Aaron Nesmith 7 Asts: Tyrese Haliburton 6
Indiana leads series, 2–1

Gainbridge Fieldhouse, Indianapolis, IN
Attendance: 17,274
Referees: Scott Foster, Sean Wright, Ed Malloy

With a looming 3–0 deficit, Karl-Anthony Towns scored 20 of his 24 points in the final quarter to will the Knicks to a 106–100 come-from-behind win on the road. It was the third time in the postseason where New York overcame a 20-point deficit during a game. The Pacers established their lead early on, expanding it to as much as 20 points in the second quarter before it was cut to 13 by half. The Knicks were still trailing by 16 midway through the third quarter and 10 entering the fourth, with Jalen Brunson in significant foul trouble. It was there when Towns scored seven quick points to bring New York within three. Brunson made a layup to give the Knicks the lead later in the quarter, which was then swapped between New York and Indiana twice before the Knicks pulled away late in the fourth.

TNT/TruTV

May 27
8:00 pm

Recap

New York Knicks 121, Indiana Pacers 130
Scoring by quarter: 35–43, 29–26, 27–33, 30–28
Pts: Jalen Brunson 31; Rebs: Karl-Anthony Towns 12; Asts: Jalen Brunson 5	Pts: Tyrese Haliburton 32; Rebs: Tyrese Haliburton 12; Asts: Tyrese Haliburton 15
Indiana leads series, 3–1

Gainbridge Fieldhouse, Indianapolis, IN
Attendance: 17,274
Referees: John Goble, David Guthrie, Courtney Kirkland

With his father, John Haliburton, back in Gainbridge Fieldhouse after a suspension from the NBA following his altercation with Giannis Antetokounmpo, Tyrese Haliburton became the first player to have a stat line of 30 points, 10 rebounds, 15 assists, and no turnovers in a playoff game since turnovers were first tracked in the 1977–78 NBA season. Jalen Brunson scored 31 points, while Karl-Anthony Towns had 24 points and 12 rebounds, and OG Anunoby finished with 22 points, but the Knicks fourth quarter rally fell short. Pascal Siakam added 30 points while Haliburton had four steals in his second career postseason triple-double. Former Knick Obi Toppin's 3-pointer with 46 seconds left put the Pacers up by 10 and sealed the game; it was his first three-point make of the series after going 0-of-6. With the win, the Pacers were one victory away from their second trip to the NBA Finals.

TNT/TruTV

May 29
8:00 pm

Recap

Indiana Pacers 94, New York Knicks 111
Scoring by quarter: 23–27, 22–29, 28–34, 21–21
Pts: Bennedict Mathurin 23; Rebs: Bennedict Mathurin 9 Asts: Tyrese Haliburton 6	Pts: Jalen Brunson 32; Rebs: Karl-Anthony Towns 13; Asts: Bridges, Brunson 5 each
Indiana leads series, 3–2

Madison Square Garden, New York, NY
Attendance: 19,812
Referees: Zach Zarba, Josh Tiven, James Williams

The Knicks won at home for the first time in the series to stave off elimination and force a Game 6 in Indiana. They became the first team during the postseason to keep the Pacers below 100 points in a game in part due an effective, swarming defensive performance which forced 19 turnovers from Indiana. The Knicks were led by Jalen Brunson, who scored the first six points for the team and finished with 32 points, and Karl-Anthony Towns who contributed 24 points and 13 rebounds. Coming off a monster Game 4, Tyrese Haliburton was limited to 8 points on 2-of-7 made field goals, while Benedict Mathurin scored a team-high 23 points off the bench. The game remained close throughout the first half, but a 20–0 run by New York midway through the third quarter allowed them to take control for good.

TNT

May 31
8:00 pm

Recap

New York Knicks 108, Indiana Pacers 125
Scoring by quarter: 24–25, 30–33, 23–34, 31–33
Pts: OG Anunoby 24; Rebs: Karl-Anthony Towns 14; Asts: Jalen Brunson 7	Pts: Pascal Siakam 31; Rebs: Haliburton, Toppin 6 each Asts: Tyrese Haliburton 13
Indiana wins series, 4–2

Gainbridge Fieldhouse, Indianapolis, IN
Attendance: 17,274
Referees: James Capers, Tony Brothers, Tyler Ford

The Pacers avenged their Eastern Conference Finals sweep from last playoffs by the Boston Celtics, with a 125–108 win in Game 6. They did so by dominating the game, particularly in the second half, to clinch their second NBA Finals appearance, after the 2000 loss to the Los Angeles Lakers. The game was close at halftime with the Pacers leading 58–54, but from then on they took full control of the game to eliminate the Knicks for the second straight year. Pascal Siakam led the team with 31 points, and was named the NBA Eastern Conference Finals MVP.

This was also the last NBA game televised on TNT. TNT lost broadcast rights to NBC and Amazon, but would continue to produce the studio show Inside the NBA for ESPN and ABC.

Regular-season series
New York won 2–1 in the regular-season series

October 25, 2024

Recap

Indiana Pacers 98, New York Knicks 123

Madison Square Garden, New York, NY

November 10, 2024

Recap

New York Knicks 121, Indiana Pacers 132

Gainbridge Fieldhouse, Indianapolis, IN

February 11, 2025

Recap

New York Knicks 128, Indiana Pacers 115

Gainbridge Fieldhouse, Indianapolis, IN

This was the ninth playoff meeting between these two teams, with the Pacers winning five of the first eight meetings.

Previous playoff series
Indiana leads 5–3 in all-time playoff series

1993

New York Knicks 3, Indiana Pacers 1

1993 Eastern Conference First Round

1994

New York Knicks 4, Indiana Pacers 3

1994 Eastern Conference Finals

1995

Indiana Pacers 4, New York Knicks 3

1995 Eastern Conference Semifinals

1998

Indiana Pacers 4, New York Knicks 1

1998 Eastern Conference Semifinals

1999

Indiana Pacers 2, New York Knicks 4

1999 Eastern Conference Finals

2000

Indiana Pacers 4, New York Knicks 2

2000 Eastern Conference Finals

2013

New York Knicks 2, Indiana Pacers 4

2013 Eastern Conference Semifinals

2024

New York Knicks 3, Indiana Pacers 4

2024 Eastern Conference Semifinals

=== Western Conference finals ===
==== (1) Oklahoma City Thunder vs. (6) Minnesota Timberwolves ====
ESPN

May 20
8:30 p.m. (7:30 p.m. CDT)

Recap

Minnesota Timberwolves 88, Oklahoma City Thunder 114
Scoring by quarter: 23–20, 25–24, 18–32, 22–38
Pts: Julius Randle 28; Rebs: Anthony Edwards 9 Asts: Naz Reid 4	Pts: Shai Gilgeous-Alexander 31; Rebs: Joe, Jal. Williams 8 each Asts: Shai Gilgeous-Alexander 9
Oklahoma City leads series, 1–0

Paycom Center, Oklahoma City, OK
Attendance: 18,203
Referees: James Capers, Tyler Ford, Mark Lindsay

After their blowout Game 7 victory against the Nuggets, the Thunder dominated the game, particularly in the second half, outscoring the Timberwolves 70–40 throughout the second half. Shai Gilgeous-Alexander scored 20 of his 31 points in the second half. The Thunder took a 10–0 run in the third quarter to take a 66–60 lead, and Kenrich Williams came off the bench and hit consecutive three-pointers to extend the Thunder's lead to 71–62, and eventually lead 76–66 heading into the fourth. Julius Randle scored 28 points, but struggled in the second half as he was limited to only eight points.

ESPN

May 22
8:30 p.m. (7:30 p.m. CDT)

Recap

Minnesota Timberwolves 103, Oklahoma City Thunder 118
Scoring by quarter: 25–29, 25–29, 21–35, 32–25
Pts: Anthony Edwards 32; Rebs: Edwards, Gobert 9 each Asts: Anthony Edwards 6	Pts: Shai Gilgeous-Alexander 38; Rebs: Jalen Williams 10; Asts: Shai Gilgeous-Alexander 8
Oklahoma City leads series, 2–0

Paycom Center, Oklahoma City, OK
Attendance: 18,203
Referees: Scott Foster, Tony Brothers, Pat Fraher

The Thunder maintained their dominant form from Game 1, winning 118–103 to take a 2–0 series lead over the Timberwolves. Oklahoma City once again dominated the third quarter, including a 23–5 run late in the third to take an insurmountable 24-point lead. A day after being announced as MVP, Shai Gilgeous-Alexander had his way on offense, leading the Thunder with 38 points and 8 assists; Chet Holmgren (22 points) and Jalen Williams (26 points, 10 rebounds) also made significant contributions for Oklahoma City. Anthony Edwards lead Minnesota with 32 points, but shot 1 of 9 from three while Julius Randle was held to only 6 points.

ABC

May 24
8:30 p.m. (7:30 p.m. CDT)

Recap

Oklahoma City Thunder 101, Minnesota Timberwolves 143
Scoring by quarter: 14–34, 27–38, 29–35, 31–36
Pts: Gilgeous-Alexander, Mitchell 14 each Rebs: Isaiah Hartenstein 6 Asts: Shai Gilgeous-Alexander 6	Pts: Anthony Edwards 30; Rebs: Anthony Edwards 9 Asts: Anthony Edwards 6
Oklahoma City leads series, 2–1

Target Center, Minneapolis, MN
Attendance: 19,112
Referees: John Goble, Josh Tiven, Curtis Blair

The Timberwolves blew out the Thunder, 143–101, to get their first win of the Western Conference Finals. Anthony Edwards scored 30 points (5-of-8 for three), nine rebounds and six assists, Julius Randle added 24 points and rookie Terrence Shannon Jr. had 15 points in 13 minutes. This was the largest win by margin in Wolves playoff history.

ESPN

May 26
8:30 p.m. (7:30 p.m. CDT)

Recap

Oklahoma City Thunder 128, Minnesota Timberwolves 126
Scoring by quarter: 37–30, 28–27, 25–28, 38–41
Pts: Shai Gilgeous-Alexander 40; Rebs: Shai Gilgeous-Alexander 9 Asts: Shai Gilgeous-Alexander 10	Pts: Nickeil Alexander-Walker 23; Rebs: Rudy Gobert 9 Asts: Alexander-Walker, Edwards 6 each
Oklahoma City leads series, 3–1

Target Center, Minneapolis, MN
Attendance: 19,250
Referees: Zach Zarba, James Williams, Bill Kennedy

A 40-point playoff career-high from MVP Shai Gilgeous-Alexander was enough for Oklahoma City to secure a narrow victory and take a commanding 3–1 series lead in Game 4. Jalen Williams scored 34 points on 13-for-24 shooting, including 6-of-9 from 3-point range and Chet Holmgren added 21 points, seven rebounds and three blocks. Gilgeous-Alexander went 12 for 14 from the free-throw line, making a pair with 6.1 seconds left to stretch the lead back to three. The Thunder fouled Anthony Edwards with 3.5 seconds remaining, who had been struggling all game on 5-13 shooting, and his intentional miss of the second free throw to try to keep possession was tracked down in the corner by Gilgeous-Alexander and flung out of bounds to drain the clock. The Timberwolves were led by Jaden McDaniels (22 points), Nickeil Alexander-Walker (23 points) and Donte DiVincenzo (21 points), with the latter two going 5-for-8 from 3-point range. Julius Randle's uneven series continued with just 5 points on 1-for-7 shooting. The end of the game also sparked some controversy, as fans believed the clock should've been reset to at least 0.5 seconds. Instead, the officials put 0.3 seconds left on the clock, and the inbounds pass was stolen by Williams to seal Oklahoma City's victory. In their Conference Finals appearances through 2024–2025, the Timberwolves now had a 1–4 record at home.

ESPN

May 28
8:30 p.m. (7:30 p.m. CDT)

Recap

Minnesota Timberwolves 94, Oklahoma City Thunder 124
Scoring by quarter: 9–26, 23–39, 30–23, 32–36
Pts: Julius Randle 24; Rebs: DiVincenzo, Edwards 6 each Asts: Alexander-Walker, Randle 3 each	Pts: Shai Gilgeous-Alexander 34; Rebs: Jalen Williams 8 Asts: Shai Gilgeous-Alexander 8
Oklahoma City wins series, 4–1

Paycom Center, Oklahoma City, OK
Attendance: 18,203
Referees: James Capers, Marc Davis, Ben Taylor

In a series defined by blowouts, the Thunder advanced to the NBA Finals for the first time since 2012, with a 124–94 victory. The game was never close as Oklahoma City outscored Minnesota 26–9 in the first quarter, just the 2nd time the entire postseason a team has been held to single digits in a quarter, the other being the Denver Nuggets in Game 4 of the Western Conference semifinals, also against the Thunder. Shai Gilgeous-Alexander had another 30-point effort with 34 overall, Chet Holmgren added 22 points, and Jalen Williams finished with 19. Oklahoma City moved to 8–1 in the playoffs at home thus far, with their margin of victory in those eight games being 51, 19, 43, 7, 32, 26, 15 and 30.

Regular-season series
Tied 2–2 in the regular-season series

December 31, 2024

Recap

Minnesota Timberwolves 105, Oklahoma City Thunder 113

Paycom Center, Oklahoma City, OK

February 13, 2025

Recap

Oklahoma City Thunder 101, Minnesota Timberwolves 116

Target Center, Minneapolis, MN

February 23, 2025

Recap

Oklahoma City Thunder 130, Minnesota Timberwolves 123

Target Center, Minneapolis, MN

February 24, 2025

Recap

Minnesota Timberwolves 131, Oklahoma City Thunder 128 (OT)

Paycom Center, Oklahoma City, OK

This was the second playoff meeting between these two teams, with the Thunder winning the first meeting as the Seattle SuperSonics.

Previous playoff series
Oklahoma City leads 1–0 in all-time playoff series

1998

Seattle SuperSonics 3, Minnesota Timberwolves 2

1998 Western Conference First Round

== NBA Finals: (W1) Oklahoma City Thunder vs. (E4) Indiana Pacers ==
Note: Times are EDT (UTC−4) as listed by the NBA. If the venue is located in a different time zone, the local time is also given.

ABC

June 5
8:30 p.m. (7:30 pm CDT)

Recap

Indiana Pacers 111, Oklahoma City Thunder 110
Scoring by quarter: 20–29, 25–28, 31–28, 35–25
Pts: Pascal Siakam 19; Rebs: Aaron Nesmith 12; Asts: Haliburton, Nembhard 6 each	Pts: Shai Gilgeous-Alexander 38; Rebs: Isaiah Hartenstein 9 Asts: Jalen Williams 6
Indiana leads series, 1–0

Paycom Center, Oklahoma City, OK
Attendance: 18,203
Referees: John Goble, Marc Davis, David Guthrie

ABC

June 8
8:00 pm (7:00 pm CDT)

Recap

Indiana Pacers 107, Oklahoma City Thunder 123
Scoring by quarter: 20–26, 21–33, 33–34, 33–30
Pts: Tyrese Haliburton 17; Rebs: Pascal Siakam 7 Asts: Haliburton, McConnell 6 each	Pts: Shai Gilgeous-Alexander 34; Rebs: Isaiah Hartenstein 8 Asts: Shai Gilgeous-Alexander 8
Series tied, 1–1

Paycom Center, Oklahoma City, OK
Attendance: 18,203
Referees: Zach Zarba, James Williams, Ben Taylor

ABC

June 11
8:30 pm

Recap

Oklahoma City Thunder 107, Indiana Pacers 116
Scoring by quarter: 32–24, 28–40, 29–20, 18–32
Pts: Jalen Williams 26; Rebs: Chet Holmgren 10; Asts: Caruso, Gilgeous-Alexander 4 each	Pts: Bennedict Mathurin 27; Rebs: Tyrese Haliburton 9 Asts: Tyrese Haliburton 11
Indiana leads series, 2–1

Gainbridge Fieldhouse, Indianapolis, IN
Attendance: 17,274
Referees: James Capers, Tony Brothers, Tyler Ford

ABC

June 13
8:30 p.m.

Recap

Oklahoma City Thunder 111, Indiana Pacers 104
Scoring by quarter: 34–35, 23–25, 23–27, 31–17
Pts: Shai Gilgeous-Alexander 35; Rebs: Chet Holmgren 15; Asts: Hartenstein, Williams 3 each	Pts: Pascal Siakam 20; Rebs: Aaron Nesmith 9 Asts: Tyrese Haliburton 7
Series tied, 2–2

Gainbridge Fieldhouse, Indianapolis, IN
Attendance: 17,274
Referees: Scott Foster, Josh Tiven, Sean Wright

ABC

June 16
8:30 p.m. (7:30 pm CDT)

Preview

Indiana Pacers 109, Oklahoma City Thunder 120
Scoring by quarter: 22–32, 23–27, 34–28, 30–33
Pts: Pascal Siakam 28; Rebs: Bennedict Mathurin 8 Asts: Tyrese Haliburton 6	Pts: Jalen Williams 40; Rebs: Chet Holmgren 11; Asts: Shai Gilgeous-Alexander 10
Oklahoma City leads series, 3–2

Paycom Center, Oklahoma City, OK
Attendance: 18,203
Referees: John Goble, Marc Davis, James Williams

ABC

June 19
8:30 pm

Recap

Oklahoma City Thunder 91, Indiana Pacers 108
Scoring by quarter: 25–28, 17–36, 18–26, 31–18
Pts: Shai Gilgeous-Alexander 21; Rebs: Chet Holmgren 6 Asts: Ajay Mitchell 4	Pts: Obi Toppin 20; Rebs: Pascal Siakam 13; Asts: T. J. McConnell 6
Series tied, 3–3

Gainbridge Fieldhouse, Indianapolis, IN
Attendance: 17,274
Referees: Zach Zarba, Tony Brothers, David Guthrie

ABC

June 22
8:00 p.m. (7:00 pm CDT)

Recap

Indiana Pacers 91, Oklahoma City Thunder 103
Scoring by quarter: 22–25, 26–22, 20–34, 23–22
Pts: Bennedict Mathurin 24; Rebs: Bennedict Mathurin 13; Asts: Andrew Nembhard 6	Pts: Shai Gilgeous-Alexander 29; Rebs: Isaiah Hartenstein 9 Asts: Shai Gilgeous-Alexander 12
Oklahoma City wins series, 4–3

Paycom Center, Oklahoma City, OK
Attendance: 18,203
Referees: James Capers, Josh Tiven, Sean Wright

Regular-season series
Oklahoma City won 2–0 in the regular-season series

December 26, 2024

Recap

Oklahoma City Thunder 120, Indiana Pacers 114

Gainbridge Fieldhouse, Indianapolis, IN

March 29, 2025

Recap

Indiana Pacers 111, Oklahoma City Thunder 132

Paycom Center, Oklahoma City, OK

This was the first playoff meeting between these two teams.

== Statistical leaders ==
Category	Game high			Average			
Category	Player	Team	High	Player	Team	Avg.	GP
Points	Donovan Mitchell	Cleveland Cavaliers	48	Giannis Antetokounmpo	Milwaukee Bucks	33.0	5
Rebounds	Rudy Gobert	Minnesota Timberwolves	24	Giannis Antetokounmpo	Milwaukee Bucks	15.4	5
Assists	Tyrese Haliburton (2×)	Indiana Pacers	15	James Harden	Los Angeles Clippers	9.1	7
Steals	Jarrett Allen; Andrew Nembhard	Cleveland Cavaliers; Indiana Pacers	6	Gary Trent Jr.	Milwaukee Bucks	2.6	5
Blocks	Zach Edey; Luke Kornet	Memphis Grizzlies; Boston Celtics	7	Zach Edey	Memphis Grizzlies	2.5	4

=== Total leaders ===
Points

1. Shai Gilgeous-Alexander - 688
2. Jalen Brunson - 530
3. Jalen Williams - 492
4. Pascal Siakam - 472
5. Tyrese Haliburton - 399

Rebounds

1. Karl-Anthony Towns - 209
2. Chet Holmgren - 199
3. Nikola Jokić - 178
4. Isaiah Hartenstein - 173
5. Josh Hart - 158

Assists

1. Tyrese Haliburton - 197
2. Shai Gilgeous-Alexander - 150
3. Jalen Brunson - 126
4. Nikola Jokić - 112
5. Jalen Williams - 111

Steals

1. Alex Caruso - 45
2. Shai Gilgeous-Alexander - 38
3. OG Anunoby - 36
4. Andrew Nembhard - 35
5. Jalen Williams / Cason Wallace - 32

Blocks

1. Myles Turner - 46
2. Chet Holmgren - 43
3. OG Anunoby - 22
4. Shai Gilgeous-Alexander - 20
5. Rudy Gobert / Aaron Nesmith - 18

Minutes

1. Shai Gilgeous-Alexander - 851
2. Jalen Williams - 796
3. Tyrese Haliburton - 772
4. Pascal Siakam - 771
5. Andrew Nembhard - 769

== Media coverage ==
This was the final playoffs that games aired nationally across ABC, ESPN, TNT, and NBA TV in the United States before both Amazon Prime Video and NBC Sports replace TNT and NBA TV next season. For the second and final time, TruTV simulcasted TNT games. This was also the final year that each team's regional broadcaster were permitted to televise local coverage of first-round games, with the exception of games on ABC. In general, during the first two rounds, ABC broadcast Sunday afternoon games, TNT had Sunday through Thursday night games, and ESPN televised Friday night games. NBA TV televised selected Tuesday through Thursday night first-round games, produced by TNT Sports. Additionally this postseason, an NBA TV/ESPNU simulcast of Game 3 of Indiana–Milwaukee on Friday, April 25 was scheduled to accommodate ABC and ESPN2's coverage of the 2025 NFL draft, airing in roughly the same time slot. Saturday first-round games were split by ABC, ESPN, and TNT, ABC then aired all the Saturday second-round games.

As per the alternating rotation, ESPN/ABC had exclusive coverage of the Western Conference finals while TNT had exclusive coverage of the Eastern Conference finals. ABC had exclusive coverage of the NBA Finals for the 23rd straight year.

NBA TV games were available on NBA League Pass as part of its normal streaming service for that channel. TNT games streamed on Max. ESPN+ also streamed game 7 of the NBA Finals alongside ABC.

The entire 2025 NBA postseason averaged 6.12 million viewers per game across ESPN and ABC, up 10 percent from 2024. In addition, the NBA generated a record-breaking 5 billion views across all social media platforms during the NBA Finals, up 215 percent from 2024.

== Sponsorship ==
NBA has continued its sponsorship agreement with Google since 2022, with Google Pixel serving as first presenting partner of the Playoffs from 2022 through 2024. Beginning with this season, it will now be rebranded as "2025 NBA Playoffs presented by Google", giving an expansion of sponsorship for other Google brands, outside of Pixel. As part of an multi-year agreement with Google, this sponsorship provides the logo branding inside the venues and in official digital properties on-court, as well as commercial inventory during ABC, ESPN, TNT, and NBA TV's telecasts of the playoff games.
