= Buchert =

Buchert is a surname. Notable people with the surname include:

- Frania Gillen-Buchert (born 1981), Scottish squash player
- Nick Buchert, American basketball official
