= Tyler Ford (basketball) =

American basketball referee

- Born: June 8, 1985 (age 40); Lima, Ohio, U.S.
- Education: Ball State University (B.A., M.A.)
- Occupation: NBA referee

Tyler Ford (born June 8, 1985) is an American professional basketball referee in the National Basketball Association (NBA), wearing number 39. As of the 2022–23 NBA season Ford has officiated 463 regular-season games and 31 playoff games.

== Early life ==
Ford was born on June 8, 1985, in Lima, Ohio. He graduated from Allen East High School in Lafayette, Ohio.

== Officiating career ==
Ford officiated Division I college basketball for four seasons. Working games for the Big Ten Conference, Mid-American Conference and the Summit League. He also spent four seasons officiating the Women's National Basketball Association (WNBA). Before Ford joined the NBA officiating staff, he officiated five seasons in the NBA G League, where he worked the 2014 NBA G League All-Star Game and the 2015 NBA G League Finals. As of the 2022-23 NBA season Ford has officiated 463 regular-season games and 31 playoff games. He is in his ninth season as an NBA referee.

== Personal life ==
Ford resides in Westfield, Indiana. From 2009 to 2015 Ford worked as the assistant director of Intramural Sports at Purdue University. He has a bachelor's and master's degree in Sport Administration from Ball State University.
