= Tony Brothers =

American basketball referee

- Born: September 14, 1964 (age 62); Norfolk, Virginia, U.S.
- Education: Old Dominion University
- Spouse: Kimberly J. Brothers
- Children: 6
- Parent: Dorothy Brothers
- Basketball career
- Position: NBA referee
- Officiating career: 1994–present

Tony Brothers (born September 14, 1964) is an American professional basketball referee who has worked for the National Basketball Association (NBA) since the 1994–95 season. Now in his 32nd season, Brothers has officiated 1,854 regular-season games, 215 playoff games, and 19 NBA Finals games. He wears uniform number 25.

== Early life and education ==
Brothers was born on September 14, 1964, in Norfolk, Virginia. He graduated from Booker T. Washington High School in Norfolk. He earned a Bachelor of Science in Business Administration from Old Dominion University (ODU) in 1986, and returned to ODU decades later to complete a master's degree, graduating again in 2022. In 2014, ODU presented him with its Distinguished Alumni Award.

Before pursuing officiating, Brothers worked for Tidewater Consultants Inc. in Virginia Beach, Virginia, where he helped design and maintain the system used for periodic maintenance on nuclear submarines, submarine tenders, and aircraft carriers.

== Officiating career ==
=== Early officiating ===
Brothers began his officiating career as a baseball umpire before transitioning to basketball. He accumulated seven years of high school officiating experience in Virginia, including assignments at three state tournaments, and one year at the junior college level. He later gained one year of collegiate officiating experience at the NCAA Division III level.

Prior to joining the NBA, Brothers spent four years officiating in the Continental Basketball Association (CBA), working three CBA Finals and a CBA All-Star Game.

=== NBA career ===
Brothers joined the NBA officiating staff for the 1994–95 season. Among his notable international assignments, he officiated the 1996 Mexico Challenge, the 1998 Schick Rookie All-Star Game, the 1999 McDonald's Championship in Milan, Italy, the 2008 NBA China Games, the 2014 Global Games in Berlin and Turkey, the 2018 NBA Basketball Without Borders Africa Games, and the 2018 NBA China Games, and the 2024 NBA Mexico City Game.

He officiated the 2009 NBA All-Star Game in Phoenix, Arizona, and the 2024 NBA All-Star Game in Indianapolis, Indiana.

Brothers considers his most memorable NBA assignment to be his Finals debut — Game 2 of the 2012 NBA Finals between the Miami Heat and the Oklahoma City Thunder. The Heat defeated the Thunder four games to one, with LeBron James winning his first NBA championship.

In a survey of NBA players, Brothers was voted as both the best and the second-least favorite referee in the league.

=== Mid-Eastern Athletic Conference ===
In September 2023, Brothers joined the Mid-Eastern Athletic Conference (MEAC) as Coordinator of Women's Basketball Officials, a role that expanded to cover men's basketball as well.

=== Virginia Basketball Officials Association ===
Brothers has served as commissioner of the Virginia Basketball Officials Association since at least 2017.

== Community work ==
Brothers co-founded Still Hope Foundation, Inc. in 2007 alongside his then-wife Monica Brothers, named in honor of their late mothers — Dorothy Brothers and Marian Bonner, both of whom had been single mothers at points in their lives. The foundation seeks to assist single mothers in the Hampton Roads area of Virginia by providing quality resources and supportive relationships. Dorothy Brothers had been a Bank of America executive and a member of the Minority Business Hall of Fame and Museum before her death.

In 2015, Brothers founded Men for Hope, Inc., a nonprofit organization aimed at supporting men through financial literacy, education, and personal development, while partnering with organizations that serve women and their families. The organization also established Men for Hope University, an e-learning platform offering accredited college courses and community-related training.

Brothers established the Dorothy B. Brothers Endowment at Norfolk State University to assist students from single-parent households, and named the Dorothy B. Brothers Auditorium on Norfolk State's campus in his mother's memory.

Among civic awards Brothers has received are a 2012 Virginia Senate Joint Resolution commending him and Monica Brothers for establishing Still Hope Foundation; a 2013 Humanitarian Award from the Virginia Center for Inclusive Communities; 2013 and 2015 Martin Luther King Community Service Awards from the Urban League of Hampton Roads and Tidewater Community College respectively; a 2014 Men Who Empower Award from the YWCA of South Hampton Roads; and the 2014 Black Men Rock 2 Award from Tidewater Community College.

In 2023, Brothers was inducted into the Hampton Roads Hall of Fame alongside Michael Vick, Ryan Zimmerman, and Francena McCorory.

== Political aspirations ==
In July 2025, Brothers announced that he was giving "serious consideration" to running for Mayor of the City of Norfolk, Virginia in the 2028 election.

== Personal life ==
Brothers has six children. He is married to Kimberly J. Brothers.
