= Nick Buchert =

American basketball official

- Born: April 17, 1983 (age 43); Orlando, Florida, U.S.
- Occupation: NBA official

Nick Buchert (born April 17, 1983) is a professional basketball official who has worked in the National Basketball Association (NBA) since the 2009–2010 season. He served as a playoff official in 2019 after serving as an alternate official from 2014 to 2018. He currently wears the uniform number 3.
