= 2024 NBA playoffs =

Professional basketball tournament

Tournament details
- Dates: April 20 – June 17, 2024
- Season: 2023–24
- Teams: 16

Final positions
- Champions: Boston Celtics (18th title)
- Runners-up: Dallas Mavericks
- Semifinalists: Indiana Pacers; Minnesota Timberwolves

Tournament statistics
- Scoring leader(s): Luka Dončić (Mavericks) (28.9 PPG)

Awards
- MVP: Jaylen Brown (Celtics)

The 2024 NBA playoffs was the postseason tournament of the National Basketball Association's (NBA) 2023–24 season. The playoffs began on April 20 and concluded on June 17 with the Boston Celtics defeating the Dallas Mavericks in the 2024 NBA Finals. Boston's first title since 2008, it was the Celtics' 18th title, breaking a tie with the Los Angeles Lakers for the most championships in NBA history. This was also the Mavericks' third NBA Finals appearance after 2006 and 2011.

The Denver Nuggets were the defending champions, but lost in the conference semifinals to the Minnesota Timberwolves. The Timberwolves and the Cleveland Cavaliers set NBA records for having the two largest comebacks in game seven in NBA history, with the former setting a record 20-point comeback win. Minnesota also reached the Western Conference finals for the second time in franchise history, after 2004.

== Overview ==
=== Updates to playoff appearances ===
- The Boston Celtics entered the playoffs for the tenth consecutive season, the longest present streak in the NBA. They also won the Maurice Podoloff Trophy for clinching the best record in the NBA for the first time since 2008.
- The Oklahoma City Thunder entered the playoffs for the first time since 2020 and also clinched the number one seed in the Western Conference for the first time since 2013.
- The Milwaukee Bucks entered the playoffs for the eighth consecutive season.
- The Philadelphia 76ers entered the playoffs for the seventh consecutive season.
- The Denver Nuggets entered the playoffs for the sixth consecutive season.
- The Miami Heat entered the playoffs for the fifth consecutive season.
- The Phoenix Suns entered the playoffs for the fourth consecutive season.
- The Minnesota Timberwolves entered the playoffs for the third consecutive season.
- The Los Angeles Clippers, New York Knicks, Cleveland Cavaliers, and Los Angeles Lakers entered the playoffs for the second consecutive season.
- The New Orleans Pelicans returned to the playoffs after losing in the play-in tournament the previous year.
- The Dallas Mavericks returned to the playoffs after missing the postseason the previous year.
- The Orlando Magic and Indiana Pacers entered the playoffs for the first time since 2020.
- The Sacramento Kings missed the playoffs after making the postseason the previous year.
- The Golden State Warriors missed the playoffs for the first time since 2021.
- The Memphis Grizzlies and Atlanta Hawks missed the playoffs for the first time since 2020.
- The Brooklyn Nets missed the playoffs for the first time since 2018.
- The Utah Jazz, Chicago Bulls, and Toronto Raptors missed the playoffs for the second consecutive season.
- The Portland Trail Blazers and Washington Wizards missed the playoffs for the third consecutive season.
- The Houston Rockets missed the playoffs for the fourth consecutive season.
- The Detroit Pistons and San Antonio Spurs missed the playoffs for the fifth consecutive season.
- The Charlotte Hornets missed the playoffs for the eighth consecutive season, currently the longest active playoff drought in the NBA.

=== Notable occurrences ===
- This was the first playoffs to not feature Chris Paul since 2010.
- With an average age of 23.9 years old, the Oklahoma City Thunder became the youngest team to earn the 1-seed in NBA history.
- The Thunder also became the seventh different Western Conference 1-seed in the last seven years, the longest stretch in the West since the 16-team format began in 1984.
- The Boston Celtics finished first in the Eastern Conference standings by 14 games, which was the largest margin between No. 1 and No. 2 in either conference since 1976.
- The Cleveland Cavaliers won their first playoff series without LeBron James since 1993, doing so against the Orlando Magic in seven games.

=== First round ===
- All home teams in the first-round matchups won game 1 for the first time since 2013.
- The Knicks' game 2 comeback against the 76ers marked just the fourth time in the play-by-play era (dating to the 1996–97 season) that a team won a playoff game after trailing by at least five points in the last 30 seconds. The Knicks were also the first team to win in regulation, as the other three teams completed their comeback in overtime.
- The Miami Heat's 23 three-pointers made in game 2 against the Celtics were the most ever by a team in a road playoff win in NBA history. This was also the Heat's franchise record for most threes made in a single playoff game.
- In game 3 against the Knicks, Joel Embiid became the first player in NBA history to score 50 points on fewer than 20 shots in a playoff game.
- The Minnesota Timberwolves swept the Phoenix Suns, marking the 48th year in a row that a sweep occurred. The last time a sweep did not occur was in 1976. This was the 184th series sweep in NBA playoffs history.
  - The series also marked the Timberwolves' first playoff series win since 2004 and the first sweep of a best-of-7 series in Minnesota men's professional sports history.
- Kevin Durant was swept in a playoff series for the second time in his career, with both instances occurring in the first round.
- For the first time in playoff history, there were four 40+ point scorers on the same day, as Devin Booker, Jalen Brunson, Anthony Edwards, and Kyrie Irving all scored 40+ points on April 28.
- Jamal Murray became the fourth player in NBA history to hit two go-ahead shots inside the final five seconds in the same postseason, and the only player to do so in the same series.
- This marked just the second time LeBron James was eliminated in the first round, with his only previous first round elimination coming against the Suns in 2021.
- The 76ers became the first team in the play-by-play era (since 1996–97) to win a playoff game when trailing by at least six points in the final 25 seconds of regulation.
- The Bucks became the first team in NBA history to win a playoff game without playing their top two leading scorers from the regular season (Giannis Antetokounmpo and Damian Lillard).
- The Celtics became the first team in postseason history to score 100+ points and hold their opponents to under 90 points in three straight playoff games.
- The Pacers' elimination of the Bucks marked their first playoff series win since 2014.
- Jalen Brunson became the third player in NBA history with four consecutive playoff games of 35+ points and 5+ assists in a single postseason, joining LeBron James and Michael Jordan.
- The Cavaliers–Magic series was the first of the 2024 playoffs to have a game 7, making it the 25th consecutive NBA postseason to feature a game 7. The last time a game 7 did not occur in the playoffs was 1999. This was the 151st game 7 in NBA playoffs history.
- Donovan Mitchell scored 52.1% of the Cavaliers' points in game 6, the most by a player with an opportunity to clinch a playoff series in NBA history.
- Mitchell recorded his third 50-point playoff game, tying Allen Iverson for the third-most 50+ point games in playoff history, trailing only Wilt Chamberlain and Michael Jordan.
- The Cavaliers won a playoff series without LeBron James for the first time since 1993.

=== Conference semifinals ===
- This was the first conference semifinals without LeBron James, Kevin Durant, or Stephen Curry since 2005.
- This was the first Western Conference semifinals without a team from California since 2005.
- Anthony Edwards joined Kobe Bryant as the only players aged 22 or younger to have consecutive 40-point playoff games.
- Jalen Brunson became the first player in NBA history to record 40+ points and 5+ assists in four straight playoff games.
- The Cavaliers' 24-point win over the Celtics in game 2 was the biggest in the playoffs by a double-digit underdog since 1991.
- This was the third straight year in which there were no series sweeps in the conference semifinals.
- Jayson Tatum became the second player since 1973 to lead both teams in a playoff series in total points, rebounds, assists, steals, and blocks after LeBron James did so in the 2016 NBA Finals.
- Kyrie Irving extended his win-loss record in close-out NBA playoffs games to 14–0. This streak would end on May 28, however, when Dallas lost game 4 of the Western Conference Finals against the Timberwolves.
- The Timberwolves’ 45-point lead in game 6 against the Nuggets was the largest margin of victory against a defending champion in NBA playoff history. It was also the second largest margin of victory in playoff history by a team facing elimination, surpassed only by the Minneapolis Lakers' 58-point victory over the St. Louis Hawks in the 1956 NBA Playoffs.
- The Pacers set an NBA playoff record for shooting percentage, making 67.1% of their shots in game 7 against the Knicks.
- The Pacers also set the highest shooting percentage rate in a half with 76.3%, making 29 out of 38 shots in the first half. This was also the highest rate in the postseason for 25 years since 1997, when the NBA began keeping detailed play-by-play for all four quarters.
- Aged 20 years and 96 days old, Dereck Lively II became the youngest player in NBA history to record 10+ points and 15+ rebounds in a playoff game, coming during game 6 of the Maverick's Western Conference Semifinal win against the Thunder on May 18.
- The Timberwolves overcame a 20–point deficit to win game 7 against the Nuggets, the largest game 7 comeback in NBA playoffs history.
- With the defending champion Nuggets losing to the Minnesota Timberwolves, the 2024 playoffs marked the fifth straight year where the defending champion was eliminated before the conference finals.
- The Nuggets' elimination also confirmed there would be unique NBA champions across a six-year span for the first time since 1975–1980.
- This marked the first time that two road teams won a game 7 on the same day.

=== Conference finals ===
- This was the fourth straight season where all four teams competing in the conference finals were different seed numbers (1, 3, 5, 6).
- Neither the first-seeded team nor the second-seeded team made the Western Conference finals for the first time since 2022.
- The Celtics entered the Eastern Conference finals for the third straight playoffs.
- This was the first Eastern Conference finals to feature either the Boston Celtics or the Miami Heat, but not both, since 2018. Each finals since that year either included both the Celtics and the Heat, or neither team.
- The Mavericks returned to the Western Conference finals after missing the previous playoffs.
- The Pacers advanced to the Eastern Conference finals for the first time since 2014.
- The Timberwolves advanced to the Western Conference finals for just the second time in team history, and the first time since 2004.
- The average age of the leading scorer for each team remaining (Tatum, Haliburton, Edwards, and Dončić for the Celtics, Pacers, Timberwolves, and Mavericks respectively) was 24.62, the youngest in a conference finals since 1971.
- Game 1 vs the Pacers was the first time in Celtics' franchise history that three of its players (Tatum, Brown, and Holiday) scored 25 or more points in a Conference Finals game.
- Dereck Lively II became the first player in NBA history to record a perfect 16/16 (100 percent) from the field in a playoff series. He surpassed Chris Andersen 's previous record of 13/13 FG made at 2013 Eastern Conference Semifinals series.
- This was the third instance (following the 2015 and 2023 playoffs) where both conference finals series had teams go up 3–0 in the series. Just like in 2015, the Celtics would go on to complete the sweep in the East, while the Timberwolves would successfully force a game 5 in the West but fell short.
- This was also the second time that the Indiana Pacers and the Minnesota Timberwolves were runner-ups in their respective conference finals, the last occurrence being in 2004.

=== NBA Finals ===
- This was the first time the Dallas Mavericks played a team other than the Miami Heat in the NBA Finals, having lost to Miami in 2006 and won against them in 2011.
- The Mavericks became the second #5 seed in NBA history to make the finals, joining the 2019–20 Miami Heat.
- Luka Dončić became the first player to lead all players in points, rebounds and assists entering the NBA Finals.
- The Dallas Mavericks' 38-point lead over the Boston Celtics (122–84) in game 4 of the Finals was the third largest margin of victory in NBA Finals history.
- Tim Hardaway Jr. joined Ray Allen and Stephen Curry as the only three players to score five or more three-pointers in a single quarter of an NBA Finals game.

== Format ==
Eight teams from each conference participated in the playoffs. The top six teams in each conference, based on winning percentage, directly qualified for the playoffs; the seeding order of those teams was also based on winning percentage. If two or more teams had the same record, standard NBA tiebreaker rules were used.

The NBA Board of Governors adopted a format starting in 2021 to have a play-in tournament involving the teams ranked 7th through 10th in each conference and became permanent starting in 2023. The 7th-place team and 8th-place team participated in a "double-chance" game, with the winner advancing to the playoffs as the 7-seed. The loser then played the winner of the elimination game between the 9th-place and 10th-place teams to determine the playoff's 8-seed. The NBA's regular playoff format then proceeded as normal. Furthermore, the winner of the match between the loser of the 7/8 game and the winner of the 9/10 game always plays on day 2 of the NBA playoffs to allow that team at least a day of rest.

Each conference's bracket was fixed with no reseeding. All rounds were a best-of-seven series; a series ended when one team won four games, and that team advanced to the next round. All rounds, including the NBA Finals, were in a 2–2–1–1–1 format with regards to hosting. In the conference playoffs, home-court advantage went to the higher-seeded team (number one being the highest). For the NBA Finals, home-court advantage went to the team with the better regular season record, and, if needed, ties were broken based on head-to-head record, followed by intra-conference record.

== Playoff qualifying ==
On March 14, 2024, the Boston Celtics became the first team to clinch a playoff spot. While noted in the below tables, division titles have no bearing on seeding.

Seeds 7 and 8 in each conference were determined via the first-stage play-in tournament, held April 16–19.

=== Eastern Conference ===
Seed	Team	Record	Clinched				
Seed	Team	Record	Play-in berth	Playoff berth	Division title	Best record in conference	Best record in NBA
1	Boston Celtics	64–18	—	March 14	March 20	March 24	April 3
2	New York Knicks	50–32	—	April 10	—	—	—
3	Milwaukee Bucks	49–33	—	April 7	April 14	—	—
4	Cleveland Cavaliers	48–34	—	April 12	—	—	—
5	Orlando Magic	47–35	—	April 14	April 14	—	—
6	Indiana Pacers	47–35	—	April 14	—	—	—
7	Philadelphia 76ers	47–35	April 14	April 17	—	—	—
8	Miami Heat	46–36	April 14	April 19	—	—	—

Chicago (39–43) and Atlanta (36–46) also secured play-in berths but did not advance to the playoffs.

=== Western Conference ===
Seed	Team	Record	Clinched				
Seed	Team	Record	Play-in berth	Playoff berth	Division title	Best record in conference	Best record in NBA
1	Oklahoma City Thunder	57–25	—	March 31	April 14	April 14	—
2	Denver Nuggets	57–25	—	March 31	—	—	—
3	Minnesota Timberwolves	56–26	—	April 1	—	—	—
4	Los Angeles Clippers	51–31	—	April 9	April 9	—	—
5	Dallas Mavericks	50–32	—	April 9	April 10	—	—
6	Phoenix Suns	49–33	—	April 14	—	—	—
7	Los Angeles Lakers	47–35	April 10	April 16	—	—	—
8	New Orleans Pelicans	49–33	April 14	April 19	—	—	—

Sacramento (46–36) and Golden State (46–36) also secured play-in berths but did not advance to the playoffs.

=== Play-in tournament brackets ===
==== Eastern Conference ====
Play-in games
7	Philadelphia	105
8	Miami	104
9	Chicago	131
10	Atlanta	116

No. 8 seed game
8	Miami	112
9	Chicago	91

Final seeds
7	Philadelphia	No. 7 seed
8	Miami	No. 8 seed

Bold Game winner
Italic Team with home-court advantage

==== Western Conference ====
Play-in games
7	New Orleans	106
8	LA Lakers	110
9	Sacramento	118
10	Golden State	94

No. 8 seed game
7	New Orleans	105
9	Sacramento	98

Final seeds
8	LA Lakers	No. 7 seed
7	New Orleans	No. 8 seed

Bold Game winner
Italic Team with home-court advantage

== Bracket ==
Teams in bold advanced to the next round. The numbers to the left of each team indicate the team's seeding in its conference, and the numbers to the right indicate the number of games the team won in that round. The division champions are marked by an asterisk (*). Teams with home court advantage, the higher seeded team, are shown in italics.

First round	Conference semifinals
**E1**	**Boston***	**4**
E8	Miami	1
**E1**	**Boston***	**4**
E4	Cleveland	1
**E4**	**Cleveland**	**4**
E5	Orlando*	3
**Eastern Conference**
E3	Milwaukee*	2
**E6**	**Indiana**	**4**
**E6**	**Indiana**	**4**
E2	New York	3
**E2**	**New York**	**4**
E7	Philadelphia	2
**W1**	**Oklahoma City***	**4**
W8	New Orleans	0
W1	Oklahoma City*	2
**W5**	**Dallas***	**4**
W4	LA Clippers*	2
**W5**	**Dallas***	**4**
**Western Conference**
**W3**	**Minnesota**	**4**
W6	Phoenix	0
**W3**	**Minnesota**	**4**
W2	Denver	3
**W2**	**Denver**	**4**
W7	LA Lakers	1

Conference finals
**E1**	**Boston***	**4**
E6	Indiana	0
**W5**	**Dallas***	**4**
W3	Minnesota	1

NBA Finals
**E1**	**Boston***	**4**
W5	Dallas*	1

- * Division winner
- **Bold** Series winner
- Italic Team with home-court advantage

== First round ==
Note: Times are EDT (UTC−4) as listed by the NBA. If the venue is located in a different time zone, the local time is also given.

=== Eastern Conference first round ===
==== (1) Boston Celtics vs. (8) Miami Heat ====
ABC

April 21
1:00 pm

Recap

Miami Heat 94, Boston Celtics 114
Scoring by quarter: 21–26, 24–34, 14–31, 35–23
Pts: Bam Adebayo 24; Rebs: Adebayo, Jović 6 each Asts: Herro, Jaquez Jr. 4 each	Pts: Jayson Tatum 23; Rebs: Jayson Tatum 10; Asts: Jayson Tatum 10
Boston leads series, 1–0

TD Garden, Boston, MA
Attendance: 19,156
Referees: Josh Tiven, Bill Kennedy, Ray Acosta

Jayson Tatum recorded his first playoff triple-double, leading the Celtics to a 114–94 Game 1 victory over the defending Eastern Conference champion Miami Heat. Tatum's performance of 23 points, 10 rebounds, and 10 assists was complemented by his teammates, as they knocked down 21 of Boston's 22 three-pointers. Derrick White added 20 points and four assists for Boston, which finished with six players in double-figures. The Heat, who were without Jimmy Butler and Terry Rozier, never held a lead and trailed by as much as 34 points. Bam Adebayo had a game-high 24 points, while Delon Wright and Jaime Jaquez Jr. finished with 17 and 16 points respectively, with Wright going 5-for-5 from beyond the arc.

TNT/TruTV

April 24
7:00 pm

Recap

Miami Heat 111, Boston Celtics 101
Scoring by quarter: 28–27, 30–34, 27–18, 26–22
Pts: Tyler Herro 24; Rebs: Bam Adebayo 10; Asts: Tyler Herro 14	Pts: Jaylen Brown 33; Rebs: four players 8 each (Note: Brown, Horford, Porziņģis, and Tatum); Asts: Porziņģis, White 4 each
Series tied, 1–1

TD Garden, Boston, MA
Attendance: 19,156
Referees: David Guthrie, Sean Wright, JB DeRosa

Without Jimmy Butler, the Heat hit a franchise playoff-record 23 three-pointers as Miami tied the series at one game apiece. Tyler Herro had 24 points and 14 assists, hitting 6-of-11 from beyond the arc, while Bam Adebayo finished with 21 points and 10 rebounds on 69% shooting. Caleb Martin also had 21 points and five threes for the Heat, who shot 53.5% (23-of-43) from beyond the arc to bounce back after a game 1 blowout. Jaylen Brown scored 33 points for the Celtics, who lost just their fifth home game of the season, while Jayson Tatum scored 28. Boston newcomers Jrue Holiday and Kristaps Porziņģis combined for 15 points and shot 5-of-21 from the field, with Porziņģis finishing with a plus–minus of –32 in a 10-point loss.

TNT

April 27
6:00 pm

Recap

Boston Celtics 104, Miami Heat 84
Scoring by quarter: 21–12, 42–27, 24–22, 17–23
Pts: Brown, Tatum 22 each Rebs: Jayson Tatum 11; Asts: Holiday, Tatum 6 each	Pts: Bam Adebayo 20; Rebs: Bam Adebayo 9 Asts: Highsmith, Jaquez Jr. 5 each
Boston leads series, 2–1

Kaseya Center, Miami, FL
Attendance: 20,092
Referees: James Williams, Mark Lindsay, Jacyn Goble

The top-seeded Celtics responded emphatically to their home loss with a wire-to-wire 104–84 victory over the Heat, retaking the series lead. Led by Jayson Tatum and Jaylen Brown's 22 points each, the Celtics improved upon their defense and held Miami to a season-low 84 points. Tatum also contributed 11 rebounds and six assists, while Kristaps Porziņģis and Derrick White added 18 and 16 points respectively. The Heat, who trailed by as much as 29, struggled to find an offensive rhythm, with Bam Adebayo and Tyler Herro combining on 13-of-34 (38%) from the field. With the win, the Celtics improved to 15–4 immediately following a loss this season and improved to 6–1 in their last seven road playoff games against Miami.

TNT/TruTV

April 29
7:30 pm

Recap

Boston Celtics 102, Miami Heat 88
Scoring by quarter: 34–24, 19–12, 28–23, 21–29
Pts: Derrick White 38; Rebs: Jayson Tatum 11; Asts: Jrue Holiday 6	Pts: Bam Adebayo 25; Rebs: Bam Adebayo 17; Asts: Bam Adebayo 5
Boston leads series, 3–1

Kaseya Center, Miami, FL
Attendance: 19,600
Referees: John Goble, Courtney Kirkland, Mitchell Ervin

Derrick White scored a career-high 38 points to move the Celtics to the brink of the second round. White shot 15-of-26 from the field and 8-of-15 from beyond the arc for Boston, who are 28–0 all-time in playoff series after taking a 3–1 lead. Jayson Tatum contributed 20 points and 11 rebounds, while Jaylen Brown added 17 points. Despite the win, the Celtics lost Kristaps Porziņģis in the first half to a calf injury, from which he would not return until the NBA Finals. For the Heat, Bam Adebayo recorded a double-double with 25 points and 17 rebounds, while Tyler Herro recorded 19 points and five turnovers. Despite a 4-of-8 three-point shooting night from Caleb Martin, the rest of the Heat shot 5-of-25 from deep, as they managed under 90 points for the second consecutive game.

TNT/TruTV

May 1
7:30 pm

Recap

Miami Heat 84, Boston Celtics 118
Scoring by quarter: 23–41, 23–27, 20–30, 18–20
Pts: Bam Adebayo 23; Rebs: Nikola Jović 7 Asts: Bam Adebayo 6	Pts: Brown, White 25 each Rebs: Jayson Tatum 12; Asts: Jrue Holiday 5
Boston wins series, 4–1

TD Garden, Boston, MA
Attendance: 19,156
Referees: Marc Davis, Ben Taylor, Brian Forte

The Celtics dominated the game from start to finish, winning every quarter and blowing out the Heat for a 4–1 series win. Derrick White scored 25 points, including 5 3-pointers. Jaylen Brown also contributed 25 points, while Jayson Tatum completed a double-double with 16 points and 12 rebounds. Sam Hauser came off the bench and shot 5-of-8 from beyond the arc en route to 17 points. The Heat endured a hard time on the offensive end, making just 3 3-pointers in 29 attempts, along with an overall field goal percentage of 41.4%, as they were limited to below 90 points for the third straight game. Bam Adebayo led the scoring for them, notching 23 points in the losing effort.

Regular-season series
Boston won 3–0 in the regular-season series

October 27, 2023

Recap

Miami Heat 111, Boston Celtics 119

TD Garden, Boston, MA

January 25, 2024

Recap

Boston Celtics 143, Miami Heat 110

Kaseya Center, Miami, FL

February 11, 2024

Recap

Boston Celtics 110, Miami Heat 106

Kaseya Center, Miami, FL

This was the seventh playoff meeting between the two teams, with the Heat winning four of the first six meetings.

Previous playoff series
Miami leads 4–2 in all-time playoff series

2010

Boston Celtics 4, Miami Heat 1

2010 Eastern Conference First Round

2011

Miami Heat 4, Boston Celtics 1

2011 Eastern Conference Semifinals

2012

Miami Heat 4, Boston Celtics 3

2012 Eastern Conference Finals

2020

Boston Celtics 2, Miami Heat 4

2020 Eastern Conference Finals

2022

Miami Heat 3, Boston Celtics 4

2022 Eastern Conference Finals

2023

Boston Celtics 3, Miami Heat 4

2023 Eastern Conference Finals

==== (2) New York Knicks vs. (7) Philadelphia 76ers ====
ESPN

April 20
6:00 pm

Recap

Philadelphia 76ers 104, New York Knicks 111
Scoring by quarter: 34–25, 12–33, 36–21, 22–32
Pts: Tyrese Maxey 33; Rebs: Tobias Harris 9 Asts: Joel Embiid 6	Pts: Brunson, Hart 22 each Rebs: Josh Hart 13; Asts: Jalen Brunson 7
New York leads series, 1–0

Madison Square Garden, New York, NY
Attendance: 19,812
Referees: Scott Foster, Brian Forte, Sean Corbin

With the Knicks' starters struggling, the New York bench outscored the 76ers' bench 42–7, with Miles McBride, Bojan Bogdanović and Mitchell Robinson leading the way to win Game 1. McBride scored 21 points and outscored Philadelphia 13–12 in the second quarter, as he brought the Knicks out of an early 13-point deficit. Josh Hart recorded a double-double and hit multiple three-pointers late in the fourth quarter, while Jalen Brunson had seven rebounds and seven assists. A hobbled Joel Embiid scored 29 points, alongside eight rebounds and six assists, while Tyrese Maxey had a game-high 33 points. Despite a higher field goal percentage, the Sixers were outrebounded, as they conceded 23 offensive rebounds to New York.

TNT/TruTV

April 22
7:30 pm

Recap

Philadelphia 76ers 101, New York Knicks 104
Scoring by quarter: 25–18, 28–31, 21–30, 27–25
Pts: Tyrese Maxey 35; Rebs: Joel Embiid 10; Asts: Tyrese Maxey 10	Pts: Jalen Brunson 24; Rebs: Josh Hart 15; Asts: Jalen Brunson 6
New York leads series, 2–0

Madison Square Garden, New York, NY
Attendance: 19,812
Referees: John Goble, Courtney Kirkland, Gediminas Petraitis

In a dramatic turnaround, the Knicks overcame a five-point deficit in the final 30 seconds to win 104–101 and take a 2–0 series lead. After Kyle Lowry missed his second free throw, Jalen Brunson, who was previously 7-for-28 from the field and 0-of-5 from beyond the arc, hit a three-pointer that bounced on the rim and dropped in. Following the inbound to Tyrese Maxey, Josh Hart stole the ball and kicked it out to Donte DiVincenzo, who missed a three-pointer, but an offensive rebound by Isaiah Hartenstein found the ball back in DiVincenzo's hands, who drained a go-ahead three with 13 seconds left. Maxey then missed a driving layup, New York made two free throws, and the Knicks secured the victory after Joel Embiid's three-point attempt missed at the buzzer. Maxey, battling flu-like symptoms, tallied 35 points, 10 assists, and nine rebounds, while Embiid finished with 34 points and 10 rebounds.

TNT/TruTV

April 25
7:30 pm

Recap

New York Knicks 114, Philadelphia 76ers 125
Scoring by quarter: 29–27, 29–28, 27–43, 29–27
Pts: Jalen Brunson 39; Rebs: Mitchell Robinson 7 Asts: Jalen Brunson 13	Pts: Joel Embiid 50; Rebs: Joel Embiid 8 Asts: Tyrese Maxey 7
New York leads series, 2–1

Wells Fargo Center, Philadelphia, PA
Attendance: 21,116
Referees: Zach Zarba, James Williams, Kevin Cutler

After vowing the 76ers were “going to win this series”, Joel Embiid scored a playoff career-high 50 points, with 18 of them coming in a decisive third quarter to win 125–114. Embiid, who's been battling Bell's palsy, was 13-of-19 from the floor, made 19-of-21 free throws, and hit five three-pointers, with four of them coming during Philadelphia's 43–27 third quarter. Tyrese Maxey finished with 25 points, and Kelly Oubre Jr. had 15 points on 75% shooting. Jalen Brunson led the Knicks with 39 points and 13 assists on an improved 48% from the field, while Josh Hart and OG Anunoby recorded 20 and 17 points, respectively. Mitchell Robinson also had seven rebounds before getting injured following a controversial flagrant foul from Embiid.

ABC

April 28
1:00 pm

Recap

New York Knicks 97, Philadelphia 76ers 92
Scoring by quarter: 17–27, 30–22, 30–27, 20–16
Pts: Jalen Brunson 47; Rebs: Josh Hart 17; Asts: Jalen Brunson 10	Pts: Joel Embiid 27; Rebs: Joel Embiid 10; Asts: Kyle Lowry 7
New York leads series, 3–1

Wells Fargo Center, Philadelphia, PA
Attendance: 21,048
Referees: David Guthrie, Sean Wright, Justin Van Duyne

Jalen Brunson scored 47 points, setting a Knicks franchise playoff record en route to securing a commanding 3–1 series lead back to New York. Brunson shot 18-of-34 from the field and finished with an assist-turnover ratio of 10 to 1, as he surpassed the 46 points scored by Bernard King in 1984. Josh Hart had zero field goals but finished with a playoff career-high 17 rebounds, while OG Anunoby had a double-double of 16 points and 14 boards. Joel Embiid had 27 points, 10 rebounds, and six assists, but shot 0-of-5 from the field in the fourth quarter and finished the game 7-of-19. Tyrese Maxey scored 23 and Kelly Oubre Jr. had 19 points as the Sixers shot 29-of-82 (35%) from the floor, their second-lowest percentage of the season.

TNT/TruTV

April 30
7:00 pm

Recap

Philadelphia 76ers 112, New York Knicks 106 (OT)
Scoring by quarter: 26–17, 17–32, 26–21, 28–27, Overtime: 15–9
Pts: Tyrese Maxey 46; Rebs: Joel Embiid 16; Asts: Joel Embiid 10	Pts: Jalen Brunson 40; Rebs: Josh Hart 9 Asts: Jalen Brunson 6
New York leads series, 3–2

Madison Square Garden, New York, NY
Attendance: 19,812
Referees: James Capers, Curtis Blair, Nick Buchert

Trailing by six with under 30 seconds and facing elimination, Tyrese Maxey converted a four-point play and hit a 35-foot game-tying three to force overtime and save the 76ers' season. Maxey finished with a playoff career-high 46 points and nine assists on 57% shooting, while Joel Embiid, who shot 7-of-19 from the field and committed nine turnovers, recorded his first playoff triple-double. Jalen Brunson had his second straight 40-point game and scored all nine of the Knicks' overtime points, but committed a crucial turnover in the waning seconds. Tobias Harris had 19 points and Kelly Oubre scored the go-ahead layup in overtime for Philadelphia, while Josh Hart and OG Anunoby tallied 18 and 17 points, respectively, for New York.

TNT/TruTV

May 2
9:00 pm

Recap

New York Knicks 118, Philadelphia 76ers 115
Scoring by quarter: 36–22, 15–32, 32–29, 35–32
Pts: Jalen Brunson 41; Rebs: Josh Hart 14; Asts: Jalen Brunson 12	Pts: Joel Embiid 39; Rebs: Joel Embiid 13; Asts: Tyrese Maxey 5
New York wins series, 4–2

Wells Fargo Center, Philadelphia, PA
Attendance: 21,093
Referees: Scott Foster, Bill Kennedy, Mark Lindsay

With the game tied at 111-111 with 26 seconds left in the fourth quarter, a wide open Josh Hart made a go-ahead three-pointer to put New York on top as they eliminated the 76ers 4-2. Jalen Brunson led the Knicks with 41 points and 12 assists on 13-of-27 shots alongside 12-of-16 free throws, his third-straight 40-point game. Hart had a double-double with 16 points and 14 rebounds, while Donte DiVincenzo added 23 points for New York. For Philadelphia, Joel Embiid recorded 39 points and 13 rebounds on 12-of-25 shots, although he committed five turnovers and fouled out in the final seconds of the game. Tyrese Maxey had 17 points on 6-of-18 shots, while Tobias Harris failed to score in 29 minutes of play. Off the bench, Buddy Hield added 20 points for Philadelphia, but he overshot a potential game-tying three-pointer at the end of the game.

Regular-season series
New York won 3–1 in the regular-season series

January 5, 2024

Recap

New York Knicks 128, Philadelphia 76ers 92

Wells Fargo Center, Philadelphia, PA

February 22, 2024

Recap

New York Knicks 110, Philadelphia 76ers 96

Wells Fargo Center, Philadelphia, PA

March 10, 2024

Recap

Philadelphia 76ers 79, New York Knicks 73

Madison Square Garden, New York, NY

March 12, 2024

Recap

Philadelphia 76ers 79, New York Knicks 106

Madison Square Garden, New York, NY

This was the tenth playoff meeting between these two teams, and the fifth since the Syracuse Nationals relocated to Philadelphia in 1963, with the 76ers winning six of the first nine meetings.

Previous playoff series
Philadelphia leads 6–3 in all-time playoff series

1950

Syracuse Nationals 2, New York Knicks 1

1950 Eastern Division Finals

1951

New York Knicks 3, Syracuse Nationals 2

1951 Eastern Division Finals

1952

Syracuse Nationals 1, New York Knicks 3

1952 Eastern Division Finals

1954

New York Knicks 0, Syracuse Nationals 2

1954 Eastern Division Round Robin Semifinals

1959

New York Knicks 0, Syracuse Nationals 2

1959 Eastern Division Semifinals

1968

Philadelphia 76ers 4, New York Knicks 2

1968 Eastern Division Semifinals

1978

Philadelphia 76ers 4, New York Knicks 0

1978 Eastern Conference Semifinals

1983

Philadelphia 76ers 4, New York Knicks 0

1983 Eastern Conference Semifinals

1989

New York Knicks 3, Philadelphia 76ers 0

1989 Eastern Conference First Round

==== (3) Milwaukee Bucks vs. (6) Indiana Pacers ====
TNT/TruTV

April 21
7:00 pm (6:00 pm CDT)

Recap

Indiana Pacers 94, Milwaukee Bucks 109
Scoring by quarter: 21–30, 21–39, 29–14, 23–26
Pts: Pascal Siakam 36; Rebs: Pascal Siakam 13; Asts: Tyrese Haliburton 8	Pts: Damian Lillard 35; Rebs: Bobby Portis 11; Asts: Patrick Beverley 8
Milwaukee leads series, 1–0

Fiserv Forum, Milwaukee, WI
Attendance: 17,341
Referees: Zach Zarba, Tyler Ford, Marat Kogut

In his first playoff game in three years, Damian Lillard scored all 35 of his points in the first half to give the Bucks a 27-point halftime lead and ultimately secure a 1–0 series advantage without Giannis Antetokounmpo. Khris Middleton also had 23 points and 10 rebounds on 64% shooting for the Bucks, while Bobby Portis added 15 points and 11 rebounds. The Pacers, who averaged a league-high 123.3 points per game, finished with a season-low 94 points and shot 8-of-38 (21%) from three-point range. Pascal Siakam finished with a game-high 36 points and 13 rebounds on 60% shooting, center Myles Turner shot 5-for-17 from the field for 17 points and eight rebounds, while Tyrese Haliburton finished with nine points and eight assists in his playoff debut.

NBA TV

April 23
8:30 pm (7:30 pm CDT)

Recap

Indiana Pacers 125, Milwaukee Bucks 108
Scoring by quarter: 30–26, 30–29, 32–28, 33–25
Pts: Pascal Siakam 37; Rebs: Pascal Siakam 11; Asts: Tyrese Haliburton 12	Pts: Damian Lillard 34; Rebs: Bobby Portis 11; Asts: Khris Middleton 6
Series tied, 1–1

Fiserv Forum, Milwaukee, WI
Attendance: 17,683
Referees: Tony Brothers, James Williams, Jacyn Goble

After a tightly contested first three quarters, the Pacers used a 23–4 run in the fourth quarter to even the series at 1–1. Pascal Siakam led the Pacers with a game-high 37 points on 69.5% from the field, along with 11 rebounds. Myles Turner and Andrew Nembhard scored 22 and 20 points respectively, as the Pacers shot 55.6% in game 2 compared to 39.6% in game 1. Tyrese Haliburton also provided 12 assists for Indiana, who snapped a 10-game playoff losing streak that dated back to 2018. Damian Lillard scored 26 by halftime for the Bucks but finished with 34, continuing his second-half struggles with just eight points in two games this series. Brook Lopez scored 22 on 6-of-7 from deep, while Bobby Portis had a double-double.

ESPN

April 26
5:30 pm

Recap

Milwaukee Bucks 118, Indiana Pacers 121 (OT)
Scoring by quarter: 22–39, 33–28, 28–23, 28–21, Overtime: 7–10
Pts: Khris Middleton 42; Rebs: Bobby Portis 18; Asts: Damian Lillard 8	Pts: Myles Turner 29; Rebs: Tyrese Haliburton 10; Asts: Tyrese Haliburton 16
Indiana leads series, 2–1

Gainbridge Fieldhouse, Indianapolis, IN
Attendance: 17,274
Referees: David Guthrie, Ed Malloy, Karl Lane

Tyrese Haliburton's game-winning three-point play in the final seconds of overtime gave the Pacers their first back-to-back postseason wins since 2014. Despite shooting 8-of-22 from the field and 1-of-12 from beyond the arc, Haliburton showcased his resiliency and recorded his first playoff triple-double with 18 points, 16 assists, and 10 rebounds in Indiana's first home playoff win in six years. Pascal Siakam had 17 points and nine rebounds, while Myles Turner's playoff career-high 29 points and nine rebounds also bolstered the Pacers' effort, as they led by as much as 19 in the first quarter. Damian Lillard was hampered by injuries, finishing with 28 points on 6-of-20 from the field, while Khris Middleton stepped up for the Bucks with a playoff career-high 42 points, including a three-pointer that sent the game to overtime. Bobby Portis also had 17 points and 18 rebounds for Milwaukee.

TNT

April 28
7:00 pm

Recap

Milwaukee Bucks 113, Indiana Pacers 126
Scoring by quarter: 33–33, 31–34, 21–31, 28–28
Pts: Brook Lopez 27; Rebs: Khris Middleton 10; Asts: Andre Jackson Jr. 7	Pts: Myles Turner 29; Rebs: Siakam, Turner 9 each Asts: Andrew Nembhard 9
Indiana leads series, 3–1

Gainbridge Fieldhouse, Indianapolis, IN
Attendance: 17,274
Referees: James Capers, Brian Forte, Brent Barnaky

Already without Giannis Antetokounmpo, the Bucks also entered this game without Damian Lillard, who injured his Achilles tendon in the previous game. Moreover, early in the first quarter, Bobby Portis was ejected after a scuffle with Andrew Nembhard. Without three key players, Milwaukee kept the game close only trailing 67–64 by halftime. However, during the third quarter, Indiana built a 17 point lead and never looked back, taking a 3–1 series lead. Myles Turner again recorded 29 points and nine rebounds, shooting 7–9 from three, while Tyrese Haliburton added 24 points in the win. For Milwaukee, Brook Lopez finished with 27 points and nine rebounds while Khris Middleton added 25 points and 10 rebounds.

TNT/TruTV

April 30
9:30 pm (8:30 pm CDT)

Recap

Indiana Pacers 92, Milwaukee Bucks 115
Scoring by quarter: 31–23, 17–30, 19–34, 25–28
Pts: Tyrese Haliburton 16; Rebs: Obi Toppin 6 Asts: Tyrese Haliburton 6	Pts: Middleton, Portis 29 each Rebs: Khris Middleton 12; Asts: Patrick Beverley 12
Indiana leads series, 3–2

Fiserv Forum, Milwaukee, WI
Attendance: 17,341
Referees: Scott Foster, Sean Wright, Sean Corbin, Ashley Moyer-Gleich

Again, Milwaukee entered game five without Giannis Antetokounmpo and Damian Lillard, looking to extend their season. Indiana held an eight point lead after the first quarter, but Milwaukee's defense responded by holding the Pacers to only 17 points in the second quarter, helping the Bucks take a 53–48 halftime lead. Milwaukee carried this momentum throughout the rest of the game, cutting Indiana's series lead 3–2 behind Khris Middleton's 29 points and 12 rebounds, as well as Bobby Portis' 29 points and 10 rebounds. Tyrese Haliburton led the Pacers with 16 points and six assists, while Myles Turner and Pascal Siakam were held to 13 and 12 points respectively.

TNT/TruTV

May 2
6:30 pm

Recap

Milwaukee Bucks 98, Indiana Pacers 120
Scoring by quarter: 24–33, 23–26, 31–34, 20–27
Pts: Damian Lillard 28; Rebs: Bobby Portis 15; Asts: Patrick Beverley 5	Pts: Obi Toppin 21; Rebs: Obi Toppin 8 Asts: Tyrese Haliburton 10
Indiana wins series, 4–2

Gainbridge Fieldhouse, Indianapolis, IN
Attendance: 17,274
Referees: Tony Brothers, Courtney Kirkland, Justin Van Duyne, Aaron Smith

Despite being injured the past two games, Damian Lillard suited up for the Bucks hoping to extend the series to game seven. However, Indiana was able to eliminate Milwaukee 4–2 with the help from their bench, outscoring the Bucks 50–10. Off the bench for Indiana, Obi Toppin recorded a playoff career–high 21 points and eight rebounds while T. J. McConnell added playoff career–highs with 20 points, nine assists, and four steals. For Milwaukee, Lillard scored 28 points and Bobby Portis recorded 20 points and 15 rebounds. Pascal Siakam scored 19 points while Tyrese Haliburton added 17 points and 10 assists. With this win, Indiana improved to 8–3 against Milwaukee this season.

Regular-season series
Indiana won 4–1 in the regular-season series

November 9, 2023

Recap

Milwaukee Bucks 124, Indiana Pacers 126

Gainbridge Fieldhouse, Indianapolis, IN

December 7, 2023

Recap

Indiana Pacers 128, Milwaukee Bucks 119

T-Mobile Arena, Las Vegas, NV

December 13, 2023

Recap

Indiana Pacers 126, Milwaukee Bucks 140

Fiserv Forum, Milwaukee, WI

January 1, 2024

Recap

Indiana Pacers 122, Milwaukee Bucks 113

Fiserv Forum, Milwaukee, WI

January 3, 2024

Recap

Milwaukee Bucks 130, Indiana Pacers 142

Gainbridge Fieldhouse, Indianapolis, IN

This was the third playoff meeting between these two teams, with the Pacers winning the first two meetings.

Previous playoff series
Indiana leads 2–0 in all-time playoff series

1999

Indiana Pacers 3, Milwaukee Bucks 0

1999 Eastern Conference First Round

2000

Indiana Pacers 3, Milwaukee Bucks 2

2000 Eastern Conference First Round

==== (4) Cleveland Cavaliers vs. (5) Orlando Magic ====
ESPN

April 20
1:00 pm

Recap

Orlando Magic 83, Cleveland Cavaliers 97
Scoring by quarter: 26–33, 15–20, 17–20, 25–24
Pts: Paolo Banchero 24; Rebs: Banchero, Wagner 7 each Asts: Paolo Banchero 5	Pts: Donovan Mitchell 30; Rebs: Jarrett Allen 18; Asts: Darius Garland 8
Cleveland leads series, 1–0

Rocket Mortgage FieldHouse, Cleveland, OH
Attendance: 19,432
Referees: James Williams, Mark Lindsay, Pat Fraher

The Cavaliers led wire-to-wire to take the series opener. Donovan Mitchell scored 30 points, Jarrett Allen grabbed 18 rebounds, Darius Garland had eight assists, and Evan Mobley notched a double-double. Paolo Banchero, the first overall pick in 2022, scored 24 points in his playoff debut but committed nine turnovers, contributing to the Magic's offensive struggles, as they shot 33% from the field, 22% from beyond the arc, and missed 11 free throws. The Cavaliers, who are 17–1 all-time in playoff series after winning Game 1, set the tone for the game after making five three-pointers in the opening five minutes of the game, giving them an early 12-point lead that they rode for the remainder of the game.

NBA TV

April 22
7:00 pm

Recap

Orlando Magic 86, Cleveland Cavaliers 96
Scoring by quarter: 18–30, 26–28, 21–22, 21–16
Pts: Paolo Banchero 21; Rebs: Franz Wagner 7 Asts: Jalen Suggs 5	Pts: Donovan Mitchell 23; Rebs: Jarrett Allen 20; Asts: three players 4 each (Note: Garland, Mitchell, and Strus)
Cleveland leads series, 2–0

Rocket Mortgage FieldHouse, Cleveland, OH
Attendance: 19,432
Referees: James Capers, Ben Taylor, Brent Barnaky

The Magic never led for the second straight game as the Cavaliers secured a 2–0 series lead. Donovan Mitchell led Cleveland with a game-high 23 points, while Jarrett Allen grabbed a playoff career-high 20 rebounds, including nine offensive boards. Evan Mobley and Darius Garland added 17 and 15 points respectively, while Isaac Okoro provided four steals off the bench. Paolo Banchero scored 21 points for the Magic, while Franz Wagner contributed 17 of his 18 points in the first half, as the duo combined for 12 turnovers. Just like in game 1, Orlando shot a dismal 36% from the field and 9-of-35 from beyond the arc as the Magic failed to score over 90 points for the second consecutive game.

NBA TV

April 25
7:00 pm

Recap

Cleveland Cavaliers 83, Orlando Magic 121
Scoring by quarter: 21–31, 24–30, 16–35, 22–25
Pts: Allen, LeVert 15 each Rebs: Jarrett Allen 8 Asts: Donovan Mitchell 7	Pts: Paolo Banchero 31; Rebs: Paolo Banchero 14; Asts: Franz Wagner 8
Cleveland leads series, 2–1

Kia Center, Orlando, FL
Attendance: 18,846
Referees: Scott Foster, Curtis Blair, Ashley Moyer-Gleich

After never trailing in the first two games of the series, the Cavaliers were handed the worst loss in their postseason history as the Magic won 121–83. Led by Paolo Banchero's 31 points and 14 rebounds, alongside Jalen Suggs' contribution of 24 points on 9-of-11 shooting, the Magic won their first home playoff game since 2011. Franz Wagner added 16 points and eight assists to the Magic's tally, as he and Banchero combined for zero turnovers. On the defensive end, they limited the Cavaliers to just 39% shooting from the field and 23.5% from deep. Jarrett Allen and Caris LeVert led Cleveland in scoring with 15 points, while the starting backcourt of Donovan Mitchell and Darius Garland combined for 18 points on 8-of-26 from the field.

TNT

April 27
1:00 pm

Recap

Cleveland Cavaliers 89, Orlando Magic 112
Scoring by quarter: 23–22, 37–29, 10–37, 19–24
Pts: Jarrett Allen 21; Rebs: Allen, Mobley 9 each Asts: Garland, Mitchell 6 each	Pts: Franz Wagner 34; Rebs: Franz Wagner 13; Asts: Paolo Banchero 5
Series tied, 2–2

Kia Center, Orlando, FL
Attendance: 18,933
Referees: John Goble, Courtney Kirkland, Kevin Cutler

Trailing by nine at halftime, the Magic opened the second half on a 41–10 run to even the series at two games apiece. With Paolo Banchero having a quiet night (nine points, five assists), Franz Wagner stepped up for Orlando, tallying 34 points and 13 rebounds on 13-of-17 shooting, as he outscored the Cavaliers by himself in the third quarter. After putting up 60 points in the first half, Cleveland struggled mightily in the second half, scoring just 29 points and enduring a scoreless drought that lasted almost seven minutes. Jarrett Allen led the Cavaliers with 21 points and nine rebounds, while Donovan Mitchell scored 18 points in the first half. However, Mitchell failed to score after halftime, going 0-of-4 from the field with four turnovers.

NBA TV

April 30
8:00 pm

Recap

Orlando Magic 103, Cleveland Cavaliers 104
Scoring by quarter: 23–33, 24–15, 23–27, 33–29
Pts: Paolo Banchero 39; Rebs: Wendell Carter 11; Asts: Franz Wagner 6	Pts: Donovan Mitchell 28; Rebs: Evan Mobley 13; Asts: Garland, Strus 5 each
Cleveland leads series, 3–2

Rocket Mortgage FieldHouse, Cleveland, OH
Attendance: 19,432
Referees: Tony Brothers, Tyler Ford, Karl Lane

In a pivotal game 5, the Cavaliers edged past the Magic 104–103, with Evan Mobley blocking Franz Wagner's layup in the final seconds to secure the victory. After the first four games had a combined eight lead changes, game 5 featured 17 lead changes. Without Jarrett Allen, Mobley filled his shoes in his absence, providing 14 points and 13 rebounds on 7-of-11 shooting, while Donovan Mitchell led Cleveland in scoring with 28 points, and Darius Garland had 17 of his 23 points in the first quarter. In his fifth career playoff game, 21-year-old Paolo Banchero scored 16 of his 39 points in the fourth quarter and finished 14-of-24 from the field for the Magic, who lost their seventh consecutive road game dating back to the regular season.

ESPN

May 3
7:00 pm

Recap

Cleveland Cavaliers 96, Orlando Magic 103
Scoring by quarter: 25–29, 24–24, 29–20, 18–30
Pts: Donovan Mitchell 50; Rebs: Morris, Strus 8 each Asts: Darius Garland 5	Pts: Paolo Banchero 27; Rebs: Carter, Isaac 9 each Asts: three players 4 each (Note: Banchero, Fultz, and Suggs)
Series tied, 3–3

Kia Center, Orlando, FL
Attendance: 19,193
Referees: Marc Davis, Josh Tiven, Gediminas Petraitis

The Magic overcame a 50-point performance by Donovan Mitchell to defeat the Cavaliers 103–96 and force a game 7 back in Cleveland. Paolo Banchero scored nine of his 27 points during a 14–7 Orlando run to end the game, Franz Wagner had 26 points, and Jalen Suggs made six three-pointers and finished with 22 points for the Magic. Meanwhile for Cleveland, Darius Garland scored 21 points on 59% shooting, Evan Mobley had five blocks, and Mitchell shot 22-of-36 from the field and scored the Cavaliers' final 22 points, including all 18 in the fourth. Although Cleveland had a significantly higher field goal percentage, they were outrebounded and shot 7-of-28 from deep, as center Jarrett Allen missed his second straight game.

ABC

May 5
1:00 pm

Recap

Orlando Magic 94, Cleveland Cavaliers 106
Scoring by quarter: 24–18, 29–25, 15–33, 26–30
Pts: Paolo Banchero 38; Rebs: Paolo Banchero 16; Asts: Franz Wagner 6	Pts: Donovan Mitchell 39; Rebs: Evan Mobley 16; Asts: Donovan Mitchell 5
Cleveland wins series, 4–3

Rocket Mortgage FieldHouse, Cleveland, OH
Attendance: 19,432
Referees: John Goble, Bill Kennedy, Kevin Scott

The Cavaliers overcame an 18-point first-half deficit and advanced to the conference semifinals for the first time in six years, and the first time without LeBron James on their roster since 1993. Trailing 49–31 midway through the second quarter, Cleveland rallied behind Donovan Mitchell, who finished with 39 points and nine rebounds on 41% from the field. Down by ten at halftime, the Cavaliers held the Magic to just 4-of-24 from the field in the third quarter, as Mitchell outscored them 17–15 in the period. Darius Garland scored 10 of his 12 points in the final quarter, Caris LeVert scored 15 off the bench, and Evan Mobley tallied five blocks and 16 rebounds. Paolo Banchero's 38-point effort for Orlando, particularly his 24 points in the first half, wasn't enough as he struggled shooting 27% in the second half. His co-stars did not fare well either, as Franz Wagner and Jalen Suggs combined to shoot 3-of-28 from the field.

Regular-season series
Tied 2–2 in the regular-season series

December 6, 2023

Recap

Orlando Magic 111, Cleveland Cavaliers 121

Rocket Mortgage FieldHouse, Cleveland, OH

December 11, 2023

Recap

Cleveland Cavaliers 94, Orlando Magic 104

Amway Center, Orlando, FL

January 22, 2024

Recap

Cleveland Cavaliers 126, Orlando Magic 99

Kia Center, Orlando, FL

February 22, 2024

Recap

Orlando Magic 116, Cleveland Cavaliers 109

Rocket Mortgage FieldHouse, Cleveland, OH

This was the second playoff meeting between these two teams, with the Magic winning the first meeting.

Previous playoff series
Orlando leads 1–0 in all-time playoff series

2009

Cleveland Cavaliers 2, Orlando Magic 4

2009 Eastern Conference finals

=== Western Conference first round ===
==== (1) Oklahoma City Thunder vs. (8) New Orleans Pelicans ====
TNT/TruTV

April 21
9:30 pm (8:30 pm CDT)

Recap

New Orleans Pelicans 92, Oklahoma City Thunder 94
Scoring by quarter: 17–17, 26–26, 25–31, 24–20
Pts: Trey Murphy III 21; Rebs: Jonas Valančiūnas 20; Asts: CJ McCollum 6	Pts: Shai Gilgeous-Alexander 28; Rebs: Chet Holmgren 11; Asts: Gilgeous-Alexander, Williams 4 each
Oklahoma City leads series, 1–0

Paycom Center, Oklahoma City, OK
Attendance: 18,203
Referees: Tony Brothers, Kevin Scott, JT Orr

Shai Gilgeous-Alexander's 28-point performance, including a go-ahead basket in the final minute, secured the Thunder's first home playoff win in five years. Rookie Chet Holmgren delivered a double-double to go along with five blocks, while Jalen Williams provided 19 points. For New Orleans, CJ McCollum had 20 points, Trey Murphy III finished with a team-high 21 points, and Jonas Valančiūnas grabbed 20 rebounds in addition to his 13 points. The game stayed close with 20 lead changes and 13 ties, as no team held a lead bigger than 10. After a Holmgren free throw made it a two-point game with 14 seconds left, Thunder rookie Cason Wallace forced McCollum into a difficult three-pointer that missed as time expired.

TNT/truTV

April 24
9:30 pm (8:30 pm CDT)

Recap

New Orleans Pelicans 92, Oklahoma City Thunder 124
Scoring by quarter: 22–35, 28–28, 24–29, 18–32
Pts: Jonas Valančiūnas 19; Rebs: Jonas Valančiūnas 7 Asts: CJ McCollum 4	Pts: Shai Gilgeous-Alexander 33; Rebs: Chet Holmgren 7 Asts: Jalen Williams 7
Oklahoma City leads series, 2–0

Paycom Center, Oklahoma City, OK
Attendance: 18,203
Referees: James Capers, Tyler Ford, Pat Fraher

After playing a tightly contested game against the eighth seed in game 1, the Thunder routed the Pelicans 124–92 to seize a 2–0 series lead. Shai Gilgeous-Alexander led the Oklahoma City onslaught with 33 points on 13-of-19 from the field, while rookie Chet Holmgren had 26 points and seven rebounds on 9-of-13 shooting. Jalen Williams added 21 points and seven assists for the Thunder, who shot 59% from the field and made 14-of-29 three-pointers. On the defensive end, they held New Orleans to under 95 points for the second straight game and forced 18 turnovers, converting them into 22 points. Jonas Valančiūnas led the Pelicans in scoring with 19, while Brandon Ingram and Herbert Jones both finished with 18 points.

TNT

April 27
3:30 pm (2:30 pm CDT)

Recap

Oklahoma City Thunder 106, New Orleans Pelicans 85
Scoring by quarter: 23–19, 37–27, 25–23, 21–16
Pts: Shai Gilgeous-Alexander 24; Rebs: Jalen Williams 9 Asts: Shai Gilgeous-Alexander 8	Pts: Brandon Ingram 19; Rebs: Larry Nance Jr. 13; Asts: CJ McCollum 7
Oklahoma City leads series, 3–0

Smoothie King Center, New Orleans, LA
Attendance: 18,659
Referees: Marc Davis, Mitchell Ervin, Gediminas Petraitis

The young top-seeded Thunder continued their dominance over the Pelicans to take a commanding 3–0 series lead. Shai Gilgeous-Alexander led the Thunder with 24 points, eight assists, and four steals, while Jalen Williams and Josh Giddey each contributed 21 points. Chet Holmgren also had eight rebounds and four blocks as Oklahoma City connected on 47% of their three-point attempts, hitting 17-of-36 shots from deep. Brandon Ingram led the Pelicans with 19 points, followed by CJ McCollum with 16 points on 7-of-22 shooting. New Orleans continued to struggle from long range, as they shot under 30% from beyond the arc for the third consecutive game, and they committed 21 turnovers that turned into 23 Thunder points.

NBA TV

April 29
8:30 pm (7:30 pm CDT)

Recap

Oklahoma City Thunder 97, New Orleans Pelicans 89
Scoring by quarter: 21–21, 23–22, 26–28, 27–18
Pts: Gilgeous-Alexander, Williams 24 each Rebs: Shai Gilgeous-Alexander 10; Asts: Chet Holmgren 5	Pts: CJ McCollum 20; Rebs: Jonas Valančiūnas 13; Asts: Brandon Ingram 6
Oklahoma City wins series, 4–0

Smoothie King Center, New Orleans, LA
Attendance: 18,487
Referees: Josh Tiven, Bill Kennedy, Ed Malloy

Oklahoma City closed the series out on a 22–9 run as the Thunder swept a playoff opponent for the first time since their NBA Finals run in 2012. Shai Gilgeous-Alexander had 24 points and 10 rebounds, while Jalen Williams scored 11 of his 24 points in the fourth quarter. Chet Holmgren and Josh Giddey each scored 14 points as the Thunder became the youngest team to win a playoff series. CJ McCollum scored 20 for the Pelicans, who continued their poor three-point shooting, making just 8-of-34 (23%) shots from deep, with Naji Marshall hitting half of them. Jonas Valančiūnas had 19 points and 13 boards but was limited by foul trouble, while Brandon Ingram shot 2-of-14 for the game and finished the series shooting 34% from the field.

Regular-season series
Oklahoma City won 2–1 in the regular-season series

November 1, 2023

Recap

New Orleans Pelicans 110, Oklahoma City Thunder 106

Paycom Center, Oklahoma City, OK

January 26, 2024

Recap

Oklahoma City Thunder 107, New Orleans Pelicans 83

Smoothie King Center, New Orleans, LA

March 26, 2024

Recap

Oklahoma City Thunder 119, New Orleans Pelicans 112

Smoothie King Center, New Orleans, LA

This was the first playoff meeting between these two teams.

==== (2) Denver Nuggets vs. (7) Los Angeles Lakers ====
ABC

April 20
8:30 pm (6:30 pm MDT)

Recap

Los Angeles Lakers 103, Denver Nuggets 114
Scoring by quarter: 33–25, 27–32, 18–32, 25–25
Pts: Anthony Davis 32; Rebs: Anthony Davis 14; Asts: LeBron James 8	Pts: Nikola Jokić 32; Rebs: Nikola Jokić 12; Asts: Jamal Murray 10
Denver leads series, 1–0

Ball Arena, Denver, CO
Attendance: 19,731
Referees: John Goble, Mitchell Ervin, Nick Buchert

In a rematch of last year's Western Conference Finals, the Nuggets won their ninth consecutive game against the Lakers, fueled by Nikola Jokić's 32 points and 12 rebounds on 65% from the field. Jamal Murray contributed 22 points and 10 assists, as the two-man game of Jokić and Murray yielded 17 assists to zero turnovers. Aaron Gordon secured a double-double while Michael Porter Jr. finished with 19 points and eight rebounds. On the Lakers' side, LeBron James scored 27 points and Anthony Davis added 32, as Los Angeles led for the majority of the first half. But a 13–0 run late in the third quarter by the Nuggets, which included three Kentavious Caldwell-Pope three-pointers, allowed them to seize control of the game.

TNT/TruTV

April 22
10:00 pm (8:00 pm MDT)

Recap

Los Angeles Lakers 99, Denver Nuggets 101
Scoring by quarter: 28–24, 31–20, 20–25, 20–32
Pts: Anthony Davis 32; Rebs: Anthony Davis 11; Asts: LeBron James 12	Pts: Nikola Jokić 27; Rebs: Nikola Jokić 20; Asts: Nikola Jokić 10
Denver leads series, 2–0

Ball Arena, Denver, CO
Attendance: 19,711
Referees: Scott Foster, Curtis Blair, Sean Wright

The Nuggets came back from a 20-point deficit to win it at the buzzer. The Lakers dominated the first half, cruising to a 59–44 lead at halftime. However, Denver, led by Nikola Jokić's 27-point, 20-rebound triple-double, fought their way back into the game. Michael Porter Jr. scored 22 points and made a game-tying three-pointer with 1:15 to go. LeBron James tried a wide-open three with the score at 99–99, but it rimmed out. The Nuggets secured the rebound, and Jamal Murray scored the game-winning fadeaway jump shot over Anthony Davis. Murray, who was 3-of-16 in the first three quarters, shot 6-of-8 and scored 14 of his 20 points in the fourth quarter. Davis led the scoring for the Lakers, tallying 32 points and 11 rebounds, but did not record a point in the fourth quarter. D'Angelo Russell made seven three-pointers after shooting 1-of-9 from deep in game 1, while James notched 26 points and 12 assists.

TNT/TruTV

April 25
10:00 pm (7:00 pm PDT)

Recap

Denver Nuggets 112, Los Angeles Lakers 105
Scoring by quarter: 23–33, 26–20, 34–22, 29–30
Pts: Aaron Gordon 29; Rebs: Gordon, Jokić 15 each Asts: Jokić, Murray 9 each	Pts: Anthony Davis 33; Rebs: Anthony Davis 15; Asts: LeBron James 9
Denver leads series, 3–0

Crypto.com Arena, Los Angeles, CA
Attendance: 18,997
Referees: Marc Davis, Josh Tiven, Mark Lindsay

The defending champions came away with their 11th straight win over the Lakers to take a commanding 3–0 series lead. Aaron Gordon led the Nuggets with a playoff career-high 29 points and 15 rebounds, while Nikola Jokić shot 9-of-13 from the field and finished one assist shy of a triple-double. Jamal Murray contributed 22 points, and Michael Porter Jr. added 20 for Denver, who have trailed by double-digits in every game this series. Anthony Davis posted 33 points and 15 rebounds for the Lakers, LeBron James contributed 26 points and nine assists, while Austin Reaves scored 22. Los Angeles missed 15 of their first 16 three-point attempts, and only got five points combined from starters D'Angelo Russell and Rui Hachimura.

ABC

April 27
8:30 pm (5:30 pm PDT)

Recap

Denver Nuggets 108, Los Angeles Lakers 119
Scoring by quarter: 23–28, 25–33, 32–30, 28–28
Pts: Nikola Jokić 33; Rebs: Nikola Jokić 14; Asts: Nikola Jokić 14	Pts: LeBron James 30; Rebs: Anthony Davis 23; Asts: Davis, Reaves 6 each
Denver leads series, 3–1

Crypto.com Arena, Los Angeles, CA
Attendance: 18,997
Referees: Zach Zarba, Tyler Ford, Sean Corbin

In danger of getting swept by the Nuggets for the second straight year, the Lakers responded with a wire-to-wire win in game 4, forcing the series back to Denver and snapping their 11-game losing streak against the Nuggets. LeBron James led the way with 30 points, Anthony Davis had 25 points and a game-high 23 rebounds, while Austin Reaves and D'Angelo Russell contributed 21 points a piece. Nikola Jokić, with 33 points, 14 rebounds and 14 assists, recorded his second triple-double of the series, Michael Porter Jr. contributed 27 points and 11 rebounds, and Jamal Murray scored 22 points, although he was 0-of-4 from deep. The Lakers this time were able to hold on to their double-digit advantage, never letting the Nuggets get any closer than 7 points.

TNT/TruTV

April 29
10:00 pm (8:00 pm MDT)

Recap

Los Angeles Lakers 106, Denver Nuggets 108
Scoring by quarter: 24–28, 29–22, 26–31, 27–27
Pts: LeBron James 30; Rebs: Anthony Davis 15; Asts: LeBron James 11	Pts: Jamal Murray 32; Rebs: Nikola Jokić 20; Asts: Nikola Jokić 9
Denver wins series, 4–1

Ball Arena, Denver, CO
Attendance: 19,861
Referees: James Williams, Kevin Scott, Gediminas Petraitis

In a closely-contested game 5, Jamal Murray hit his second game-winner of the series, thus giving the Nuggets the series-clinching win over the Lakers. Murray led the way for the Nuggets with 32 points, 12 of which came in the fourth quarter. Nikola Jokić, although committing an uncharacteristic 7 turnovers, nonetheless finished the game with 25 points, 20 rebounds and 9 assists, narrowly missing out on his third triple-double of the series. Michael Porter Jr. stood out once again, scoring 26 points and making 5 of his 7 three-point attempts. For the Lakers, LeBron James once again led the way with 30 points and 11 assists, Anthony Davis finished with an efficient 17 points and 15 rebounds, shooting 72.7% from the field, while Austin Reaves and D'Angelo Russell had 19 and 14 points respectively, although shot a combined 3-of-14 from three.

Regular-season series
Denver won 3–0 in the regular-season series

October 24, 2023

Recap

Los Angeles Lakers 107, Denver Nuggets 119

Ball Arena, Denver, CO

February 8, 2024

Recap

Denver Nuggets 114, Los Angeles Lakers 106

Crypto.com Arena, Los Angeles, CA

March 2, 2024

Recap

Denver Nuggets 124, Los Angeles Lakers 114

Crypto.com Arena, Los Angeles, CA

This was the ninth playoff meeting between these two teams, with the Lakers winning seven of the first eight meetings.

Previous playoff series
LA Lakers lead 7–1 in all-time playoff series

1979

Denver Nuggets 1, Los Angeles Lakers 2

1979 Western Conference First Round

1985

Los Angeles Lakers 4, Denver Nuggets 1

1985 Western Conference finals

1987

Los Angeles Lakers 3, Denver Nuggets 0

1987 Western Conference First Round

2008

Los Angeles Lakers 4, Denver Nuggets 0

2008 Western Conference First Round

2009

Los Angeles Lakers 4, Denver Nuggets 2

2009 Western Conference finals

2012

Los Angeles Lakers 4, Denver Nuggets 3

2012 Western Conference First Round

2020

Los Angeles Lakers 4, Denver Nuggets 1

2020 Western Conference finals

2023

Denver Nuggets 4, Los Angeles Lakers 0

2023 Western Conference finals

==== (3) Minnesota Timberwolves vs. (6) Phoenix Suns ====
ESPN

April 20
3:30 pm (2:30 pm CDT)

Recap

Phoenix Suns 95, Minnesota Timberwolves 120
Scoring by quarter: 28–27, 23–34, 21–31, 23–28
Pts: Kevin Durant 31; Rebs: Kevin Durant 7 Asts: Bradley Beal 6	Pts: Anthony Edwards 33; Rebs: Rudy Gobert 16; Asts: Mike Conley 7
Minnesota leads series, 1–0

Target Center, Minneapolis, MN
Attendance: 19,478
Referees: Marc Davis, Ben Taylor, Aaron Smith

Anthony Edwards scored 18 of his 33 points in a pivotal third quarter to help the Timberwolves take a 1–0 series lead. Edwards led a 19–4 run to close the third quarter, as Minnesota held the Suns to zero field goals in the final seven minutes of the quarter. Karl-Anthony Towns chipped in with 19 points, Nickeil Alexander-Walker contributed 18 points and four steals off the bench, while Rudy Gobert anchored the defense with 14 points and 16 rebounds. Despite Kevin Durant's 31-point performance on 65% shooting for the Suns, alongside Bradley Beal's 15 points on 60% from the field, the Wolves outrebounded Phoenix 52–28 and outscored them in the paint 52–34. The Minnesota bench also outscored the Suns' reserves 41–18.

TNT/TruTV

April 23
7:30 pm (6:30 pm CDT)

Recap

Phoenix Suns 93, Minnesota Timberwolves 105
Scoring by quarter: 21–24, 30–26, 20–28, 22–27
Pts: Devin Booker 20; Rebs: Jusuf Nurkić 14; Asts: Bradley Beal 6	Pts: Jaden McDaniels 25; Rebs: Rudy Gobert 9 Asts: Anthony Edwards 8
Minnesota leads series, 2–0

Target Center, Minneapolis, MN
Attendance: 19,310
Referees: Zach Zarba, Josh Tiven, Dedric Taylor

Jaden McDaniels led all scorers with a playoff career-high 25 points and spearheaded another stifling defensive performance by the Timberwolves to win 105–93. Rudy Gobert and Mike Conley both contributed 18 points while Phoenix was focused on containing Anthony Edwards, who shot 3-of-12 with 15 points and eight assists. Despite Phoenix's efforts to rally, Minnesota's 11–0 fourth-quarter run solidified their second-ever 2–0 playoff series lead. The Suns' "big three" of Kevin Durant, Devin Booker, and Bradley Beal struggled, shooting a combined 18-for-45 (40%), while the Timberwolves capitalized on turnovers, scoring 31 points off 20 Phoenix errors compared to the Suns' two points from Minnesota's 14 turnovers.

ESPN

April 26
10:30 pm (7:30 pm MST)

Recap

Minnesota Timberwolves 126, Phoenix Suns 109
Scoring by quarter: 34–32, 25–21, 36–20, 31–36
Pts: Anthony Edwards 36; Rebs: Rudy Gobert 14; Asts: Mike Conley 7	Pts: Bradley Beal 28; Rebs: Jusuf Nurkić 7 Asts: Devin Booker 8
Minnesota leads series, 3–0

Footprint Center, Phoenix, AZ
Attendance: 17,071
Referees: Tony Brothers, Kevin Scott, JB DeRosa

In a dominant display, Anthony Edwards propelled the Timberwolves to the brink of their first playoff series win in 20 years. Edwards scored 18 of his 36 points in the fourth quarter, while Rudy Gobert had 19 points and 14 rebounds for Minnesota, who never trailed. For the third consecutive game, the Wolves overwhelmed the Suns in the third quarter, highlighted by Nickeil Alexander-Walker's four three-pointers, to take a 22-point lead into the final quarter. Bradley Beal scored 28 points, Kevin Durant had 25, and Devin Booker finished with 23 points for the Suns, while the rest of the team scored just 33 points. Meanwhile, Minnesota had six players finish in double figures and dominated the boards with a 50–28 rebounding margin.

TNT

April 28
9:30 pm (6:30 pm MST)

Recap

Minnesota Timberwolves 122, Phoenix Suns 116
Scoring by quarter: 25–26, 31–35, 34–31, 32–24
Pts: Anthony Edwards 40; Rebs: Karl-Anthony Towns 10; Asts: Mike Conley 7	Pts: Devin Booker 49; Rebs: Kevin Durant 9 Asts: Devin Booker 6
Minnesota wins series, 4–0

Footprint Center, Phoenix, AZ
Attendance: 17,071
Referees: Scott Foster, Curtis Blair, Pat Fraher

The Timberwolves completed the sweep of the Suns to advance past the first round for only the second time in franchise history. The game was tied or within four points for almost the entire game, as neither team led by more than six. The Wolves were able to pull away thanks to Anthony Edwards, who scored 31 of his 40 points in the second half on 11-of-15 shooting, while Karl-Anthony Towns finished with 28 points and 10 rebounds on 65% from the field. For Phoenix, Devin Booker scored a playoff career-high 49 points on 62% from the field and 20-of-21 from the free throw line, while Kevin Durant scored 33 points on 12-of-17 shooting. But no other player finished with double digits, as Bradley Beal fouled out after finishing with nine points and six turnovers. The victory was marred for Minnesota, as head coach Chris Finch suffered a ruptured patellar tendon after a collision with Mike Conley in the fourth quarter.

Regular-season series
Phoenix won 3–0 in the regular-season series

November 15, 2023

Recap

Minnesota Timberwolves 115, Phoenix Suns 133

Footprint Center, Phoenix, AZ

April 5, 2024

Recap

Minnesota Timberwolves 87, Phoenix Suns 97

Footprint Center, Phoenix, AZ

April 14, 2024

Recap

Phoenix Suns 125, Minnesota Timberwolves 106

Target Center, Minneapolis, MN

This was the first playoff meeting between these two teams.

==== (4) Los Angeles Clippers vs. (5) Dallas Mavericks ====
ABC

April 21
3:30 pm (12:30 pm PDT)

Recap

Dallas Mavericks 97, Los Angeles Clippers 109
Scoring by quarter: 22–34, 8–22, 34–31, 33–22
Pts: Luka Dončić 33; Rebs: Luka Dončić 13; Asts: Luka Dončić 6	Pts: James Harden 28; Rebs: Ivica Zubac 15; Asts: James Harden 8
LA Clippers lead series, 1–0

Crypto.com Arena, Los Angeles, CA
Attendance: 19,370
Referees: David Guthrie, Ed Malloy, Karl Lane

In their playoff series opener, James Harden and Ivica Zubac led the Clippers to a 109–97 victory over the Mavericks, with Harden recording 28 points and eight assists in his playoff debut for the Clippers, while Zubac achieved a playoff career-high of 20 points alongside 15 rebounds. Despite Luka Dončić's 33 points and Kyrie Irving's 31 (with 20 of those points coming on 100% shooting in the third quarter), the Mavericks had only one other player finish in double figures. Meanwhile, the Clippers, who were missing Kawhi Leonard due to injury, limited Dallas to their fewest points in a playoff half, as they held them to 22% from the field and 2-of-18 from beyond the arc in the first half to secure a commanding 26-point halftime lead.

TNT

April 23
10:00 pm (7:00 pm PDT)

Recap

Dallas Mavericks 96, Los Angeles Clippers 93
Scoring by quarter: 23–19, 22–22, 20–25, 31–27
Pts: Luka Dončić 32; Rebs: Dereck Lively II 9 Asts: Luka Dončić 9	Pts: George, Harden 22 each Rebs: Ivica Zubac 12; Asts: James Harden 8
Series tied, 1–1

Crypto.com Arena, Los Angeles, CA
Attendance: 19,370
Referees: Marc Davis, Kevin Scott, Brian Forte

Luka Dončić had 32 points and nine assists, Kyrie Irving scored 23, and P. J. Washington scored 10 of his 18 points in the fourth quarter to beat the Clippers 96–93. After the Mavericks led for most of the game, Dallas trailed by six with 9:32 left in the fourth quarter. The Mavericks responded by scoring 14 straight points to permanently give them the lead, with all 14 of those points coming from Dončić, Irving, and Washington. Paul George and James Harden each scored 22 points while Ivica Zubac recorded a double-double. Kawhi Leonard also had 15 points and four steals in his first game since March 31. The Clippers shot 37% from the floor and made just 8-of-30 three-pointers after shooting 50% (18-of-36) from deep in game 1.

ESPN

April 26
8:00 pm (7:00 pm CDT)

Recap

Los Angeles Clippers 90, Dallas Mavericks 101
Scoring by quarter: 23–18, 18–36, 26–24, 23–23
Pts: Harden, Powell 21 each Rebs: Kawhi Leonard 9 Asts: George, Harden 5 each	Pts: Luka Dončić 22; Rebs: Luka Dončić 10; Asts: Luka Dončić 9
Dallas leads series, 2–1

American Airlines Center, Dallas, TX
Attendance: 20,402
Referees: James Capers, Bill Kennedy, Justin Van Duyne

In the Mavericks' defensive-minded victory over the Clippers, Luka Dončić led the charge with 22 points, 10 rebounds, and nine assists. With Dončić struggling with his shooting efficiency, going 7-of-25 from the field and 3-of-14 from beyond the arc, his co-star Kyrie Irving poured 19 of his 21 points in the final 14 minutes of the game to keep the Clippers at bay. Despite a strong first half, James Harden's scoring output diminished in the second half for the Clippers, finishing with 21 points, while Norman Powell scored 21 off the bench. The Clippers' offense was hampered by 19 turnovers, and they also got little offensive support from Paul George and Russell Westbrook, as the pair combined for eight points on 3-of-18 shooting.

ABC

April 28
3:30 pm (2:30 pm CDT)

Recap

Los Angeles Clippers 116, Dallas Mavericks 111
Scoring by quarter: 39–16, 27–33, 16–29, 34–33
Pts: George, Harden 33 each Rebs: George, Harden 6 each Asts: Paul George 8	Pts: Kyrie Irving 40; Rebs: Luka Dončić 10; Asts: Luka Dončić 10
Series tied, 2–2

American Airlines Center, Dallas, TX
Attendance: 20,411
Referees: Tony Brothers, Ben Taylor, Nick Buchert

The Clippers squandered a 31-point lead but rallied to win, led by Paul George and James Harden, reclaiming home-court advantage. Without Kawhi Leonard, Los Angeles jumped out to an early 55–24 lead as George scored 26 points of his 33 points in the first half. However, the Mavericks rallied behind Kyrie Irving, who had his first 40-point playoff game in seven years, as his layup gave Dallas the lead with 2:14 remaining. However, a step-back three by George and key floaters from Harden, who scored 15 of his 33 points in the fourth quarter, secured the victory. Luka Dončić recorded his fourth playoff triple-double, while the Clippers shot 62% from beyond the arc, with George and Harden hitting a combined 11-of-15 three-pointers.

TNT/TruTV

May 1
10:00 pm (7:00 pm PDT)

Recap

Dallas Mavericks 123, Los Angeles Clippers 93
Scoring by quarter: 25–24, 31–22, 33–23, 34–24
Pts: Luka Dončić 35; Rebs: Dončić, Lively II 7 each Asts: Luka Dončić 10	Pts: George, Zubac 15 each Rebs: Paul George 11; Asts: James Harden 7
Dallas leads series, 3–2

Crypto.com Arena, Los Angeles, CA
Attendance: 19,370
Referees: Zach Zarba, James Williams, Mitchell Ervin

Battling a sprained knee and an illness, Luka Dončić led the Mavericks with 35 points, seven rebounds, and 10 assists as Dallas routed the Clippers by 30 points to take a 3–2 series lead. Dončić shot over 50% for the first time this series, Maxi Kleber hit five three-pointers, and Kyrie Irving added 14 points for the Mavericks, who handed the Clippers the biggest margin of defeat in their playoff history. Ivica Zubac shot 7-of-8 from the field and Bones Hyland had 11 points in garbage time for Los Angeles. Paul George and James Harden shot a combined 6-of-25 (24%) from the field and committed seven turnovers, while Russell Westbrook continued his shooting woes, going 2-of-11 and shooting a mere 6-of-35 (17%) in his last four games.

- Game 5 was the last Clippers home game played at Crypto.com Arena, as the team moved its home games to Intuit Dome the following season.

ESPN

May 3
9:30 pm (8:30 pm CDT)

Recap

Los Angeles Clippers 101, Dallas Mavericks 114
Scoring by quarter: 26–34, 26–18, 20–35, 29–27
Pts: Norman Powell 20; Rebs: George, Zubac 11 each Asts: James Harden 13	Pts: Kyrie Irving 30; Rebs: Dereck Lively II 9 Asts: Luka Dončić 13
Dallas wins series, 4–2

American Airlines Center, Dallas, TX
Attendance: 20,625
Referees: John Goble, Tyler Ford, Sean Wright

Luka Dončić set the tone by scoring 18 of his 28 points in the first half, and Kyrie Irving closed out the Clippers by scoring 28 of his 30 points in the second half as the Mavericks advanced to the Western semifinals for the second time in three years. Dončić finished with 13 assists but struggled with his shooting, going 9-of-26 from the field and missing nine of his 10 three-pointers, while Irving shot 10-of-13 from the field after halftime, as he improved to 13–0 in series-clinching games for his career. For the Clippers, Norman Powell had 20 points off the bench and Ivica Zubac recorded his third double-double of the series, while Paul George and James Harden continued to struggle, combining for 34 points on 32% (11-of-34) shooting.

Regular-season series
LA Clippers won 2–1 in the regular-season series

November 10, 2023

Recap

Los Angeles Clippers 126, Dallas Mavericks 144

American Airlines Center, Dallas, TX

November 25, 2023

Recap

Dallas Mavericks 88, Los Angeles Clippers 107

Crypto.com Arena, Los Angeles, CA

December 20, 2023

Recap

Los Angeles Clippers 120, Dallas Mavericks 111

American Airlines Center, Dallas, TX

This was the third playoff meeting between these two teams, with the Clippers winning the first two meetings.

Previous playoff series
LA Clippers lead 2–0 in all-time playoff series

2020

Los Angeles Clippers 4, Dallas Mavericks 2

2020 Western Conference First Round

2021

Los Angeles Clippers 4, Dallas Mavericks 3

2021 Western Conference First Round

== Conference semifinals ==
Note: Times are EDT (UTC−4) as listed by the NBA. If the venue is located in a different time zone, the local time is also given.

=== Eastern Conference semifinals ===
==== (1) Boston Celtics vs. (4) Cleveland Cavaliers ====
TNT/TruTV

May 7
7:00 pm

Recap

Cleveland Cavaliers 95, Boston Celtics 120
Scoring by quarter: 34–40, 15–19, 28–33, 18–28
Pts: Donovan Mitchell 33; Rebs: Evan Mobley 13; Asts: Garland, Mitchell 5 each	Pts: Jaylen Brown 32; Rebs: Jayson Tatum 11; Asts: Tatum, White 5 each
Boston leads series, 1–0

TD Garden, Boston, MA
Attendance: 19,156
Referees: Scott Foster, Curtis Blair, Mitchell Ervin

Jaylen Brown scored 32 points on 12-of-18 from the field, while Derrick White made 7-of-12 three-pointers and finished with 25 points as the Celtics cruised to a 120–95 victory in the series opener. Jayson Tatum added 18 points and 11 rebounds, while Payton Pritchard added 16 points off the bench as Boston improved to 20–0 this season when holding their opponent to fewer than 100 points. Donovan Mitchell provided a game-high 33 points for the Cavaliers, while Evan Mobley shot 8-of-12 from the field and finished with a double-double. Darius Garland finished with 14 points as Cleveland struggled from long range, shooting just 11-of-42, while the Celtics capitalized and shot a more efficient 18-of-46 from beyond the arc.

ESPN

May 9
7:00 pm

Recap

Cleveland Cavaliers 118, Boston Celtics 94
Scoring by quarter: 30–24, 24–30, 36–24, 28–16
Pts: Donovan Mitchell 29; Rebs: Evan Mobley 10; Asts: Donovan Mitchell 8	Pts: Jayson Tatum 25; Rebs: Jayson Tatum 7 Asts: Jayson Tatum 6
Series tied, 1–1

TD Garden, Boston, MA
Attendance: 19,156
Referees: John Goble, Bill Kennedy, Nick Buchert

After getting blown out in the opening game of the series, the Cavaliers responded with a 24-point victory over the top-seeded Celtics to even the series at 1–1. Donovan Mitchell finished with eight assists and scored 16 of his 29 points in the third quarter to push the Cleveland lead to double digits, as they led by as much as 29 points in the fourth quarter. Evan Mobley recorded his third consecutive double-double, while Caris LeVert provided 21 points off the bench as the Cavaliers shot 13-of-28 (46%) from beyond the arc. Jayson Tatum and Jaylen Brown finished with 25 and 19 points, respectively, while Derrick White struggled, managing only 10 points as he and Brown shot a combined 1-of-14 (7%) from three-point range.

ABC

May 11
8:30 pm

Recap

Boston Celtics 106, Cleveland Cavaliers 93
Scoring by quarter: 30–28, 27–20, 27–21, 22–24
Pts: Jayson Tatum 33; Rebs: Jayson Tatum 13; Asts: Jayson Tatum 6	Pts: Donovan Mitchell 33; Rebs: Evan Mobley 8 Asts: Darius Garland 6
Boston leads series, 2–1

Rocket Mortgage FieldHouse, Cleveland, OH
Attendance: 19,432
Referees: Zach Zarba, James Williams, Mark Lindsay

Jayson Tatum registered his first 30-point game of the playoffs and Jaylen Brown (28 points) shot an efficient 13-of-17 from the floor as the Celtics reclaimed the series lead. Jrue Holiday, who had been struggling with his shooting, scored 15 of his 18 points in the first half on 70% from the field, while Tatum logged 13 rebounds and six assists. Despite a strong start from Donovan Mitchell, who scored 33 points and made seven three-pointers, the Cavaliers struggled to match the Celtics' intensity, particularly in the second half. Evan Mobley and Caris LeVert each provided 15+ points, while the rest of Cleveland's starters (Garland, Strus, and Okoro) shot a combined 30% (9-of-30) from the field and 19% (3-of-16) from beyond the arc.

TNT/TruTV

May 13
7:00 pm

Recap

Boston Celtics 109, Cleveland Cavaliers 102
Scoring by quarter: 37–30, 25–27, 26–21, 21–24
Pts: Jayson Tatum 33; Rebs: Jayson Tatum 11; Asts: Holiday, Tatum 5 each	Pts: Darius Garland 30; Rebs: Evan Mobley 9 Asts: Garland, Strus 7 each
Boston leads series, 3–1

Rocket Mortgage FieldHouse, Cleveland, OH
Attendance: 19,432
Referees: Marc Davis, Courtney Kirkland, Tyler Ford

The Celtics beat the shorthanded Cavaliers 109–102 to take a commanding 3–1 series lead back to Boston. Jayson Tatum and Jaylen Brown combined for 60 points and fought off a late rally by Cleveland by scoring 15 of the Celtics' 21 fourth-quarter points. The duo also made 16-of-18 free throws, compared to just seven total free throw attempts for the Cavaliers. Jrue Holiday (16 points) hit 4-of-8 three-pointers for Boston, who improved to 4–0 on the road this postseason. Darius Garland stepped up for Cleveland, who were missing starters Donovan Mitchell and Jarrett Allen, with his first 30-point game of the playoffs. Evan Mobley and Caris LeVert each tallied 19 points, while Max Strus made 5-of-9 three-pointers before fouling out.

TNT/TruTV

May 15
7:00 pm

Recap

Cleveland Cavaliers 98, Boston Celtics 113
Scoring by quarter: 28–28, 24–30, 26–27, 20–28
Pts: Evan Mobley 33; Rebs: Mobley, Strus 7 each Asts: Garland, Strus 9 each	Pts: Jayson Tatum 25; Rebs: Al Horford 15; Asts: Jayson Tatum 9
Boston wins series, 4–1

TD Garden, Boston, MA
Attendance: 19,156
Referees: Tony Brothers, David Guthrie, Ben Taylor

The shorthanded Cavaliers were unable to overcome the Celtics as they were eliminated 113–98. Jayson Tatum scored 25 points and made 4 steals but was one assist shy of a triple-double while also becoming the second player since 1973 to lead both teams in a playoff series in total points, rebounds, assists, steals, and blocks after LeBron James did it in the 2016 NBA Finals. Meanwhile Al Horford sunk 6 three-pointers and tallied 15 rebounds and 3 blocks. Derrick White added 18 points. Evan Mobley tied his season-high with 33 points as Cleveland were left without Donovan Mitchell, Jarrett Allen and Caris LeVert. Marcus Morris Sr., who barely saw playing time throughout the playoffs, had a breakout performance with 25 points on 10-of-13 (77%) shooting and made 5 three-pointers. Darius Garland struggled, making only 4-of-17 (24%) for 11 points.

Regular-season series
Boston won 2–1 in the regular-season series

December 12, 2023

Recap

Cleveland Cavaliers 113, Boston Celtics 120

TD Garden, Boston, MA

December 14, 2023

Recap

Cleveland Cavaliers 107, Boston Celtics 116

TD Garden, Boston, MA

March 5, 2024

Recap

Boston Celtics 104, Cleveland Cavaliers 105

Rocket Mortgage FieldHouse, Cleveland, OH

This was the ninth playoff meeting between these two teams, with each team winning four series apiece.

Previous playoff series
Tied 4–4 in all-time playoff series

1976

Boston Celtics 4, Cleveland Cavaliers 2

1976 Eastern Conference finals

1985

Boston Celtics 3, Cleveland Cavaliers 1

1985 Eastern Conference First Round

1992

Boston Celtics 3, Cleveland Cavaliers 4

1992 Eastern Conference semifinals

2008

Boston Celtics 4, Cleveland Cavaliers 3

2008 Eastern Conference semifinals

2010

Cleveland Cavaliers 2, Boston Celtics 4

2010 Eastern Conference semifinals

2015

Cleveland Cavaliers 4, Boston Celtics 0

2015 Eastern Conference First Round

2017

Boston Celtics 1, Cleveland Cavaliers 4

2017 Eastern Conference finals

2018

Boston Celtics 3, Cleveland Cavaliers 4

2018 Eastern Conference finals

==== (2) New York Knicks vs. (6) Indiana Pacers ====
TNT/TruTV

May 6
7:30 pm

Recap

Indiana Pacers 117, New York Knicks 121
Scoring by quarter: 24–27, 31–22, 32–33, 30–39
Pts: Myles Turner 23; Rebs: three players 6 each (Note: Nesmith, Siakam, and Toppin); Asts: Tyrese Haliburton 8	Pts: Jalen Brunson 43; Rebs: Josh Hart 13; Asts: Josh Hart 8
New York leads series, 1–0

Madison Square Garden, New York, NY
Attendance: 19,812
Referees: Zach Zarba, Tyler Ford, Sean Wright

Jalen Brunson recorded his fourth consecutive 40-point game and rallied the Knicks from a nine-point deficit in the fourth quarter to win the series opener. Brunson scored 21 of his 43 points in the fourth quarter, Donte DiVincenzo scored 25 points and hit the go-ahead three-pointer with 40 seconds remaining, while Josh Hart shot 69% from the field, finishing with 24 points and 13 rebounds in 48 minutes played. Myles Turner finished with a team-high 23 points for the Pacers, while Pascal Siakam finished with 19 points as Indiana got strong support from their bench, as they outscored New York's bench 46–3. Tyrese Haliburton had eight assists and four steals but finished the fourth quarter with zero points and three turnovers.

TNT/TruTV

May 8
8:00 pm

Recap

Indiana Pacers 121, New York Knicks 130
Scoring by quarter: 36–36, 37–27, 18–36, 30–31
Pts: Tyrese Haliburton 34; Rebs: Pascal Siakam 9 Asts: T. J. McConnell 12	Pts: Jalen Brunson 29; Rebs: Josh Hart 15; Asts: Isaiah Hartenstein 8
New York leads series, 2–0

Madison Square Garden, New York, NY
Attendance: 19,812
Referees: Marc Davis, Josh Tiven, JB DeRosa

After missing the entire second quarter due to a foot injury and trailing by ten at halftime, Jalen Brunson's return in the second half sparked a 21–4 run and propelled the Knicks to a 2–0 series lead. Brunson scored 29 points and shot 11-of-18 from the field, while OG Anunoby had 28 points before leaving in the third quarter with a hamstring injury. Donte DiVincenzo also finished with 28 points, Isaiah Hartenstein had a double-double with eight assists, and Josh Hart played all 48 minutes and finished with 15 rebounds on 8-of-12 from the field. For the Pacers, Tyrese Haliburton rebounded from a six-point performance in game 1 with 34 points and nine assists, while the Indiana bench provided 46 points for the second straight game.

ESPN

May 10
7:00 pm

Recap

New York Knicks 106, Indiana Pacers 111
Scoring by quarter: 20–29, 38–34, 32–22, 16–26
Pts: Donte DiVincenzo 35; Rebs: Josh Hart 18; Asts: Jalen Brunson 6	Pts: Tyrese Haliburton 35; Rebs: Myles Turner 10; Asts: Tyrese Haliburton 7
New York leads series, 2–1

Gainbridge Fieldhouse, Indianapolis, IN
Attendance: 17,274
Referees: James Capers, Kevin Scott, Brent Barnaky

Andrew Nembhard, who had been scoreless through 46 minutes, hit a 31-foot, go-ahead three-pointer with 16 seconds to go, giving the Pacers a critical 111–106 victory. Tyrese Haliburton finished with 35 points and seven assists, as he rallied Indiana from a nine-point deficit in the fourth quarter to avoid a 3–0 series deficit. Pascal Siakam shined with 26 points and seven rebounds on 9-of-14 shooting, while Myles Turner contributed 21 points and 10 rebounds as the Pacers improved to 4–0 at home this postseason. Donte DiVincenzo led the Knicks, who were without OG Anunoby, with 35 points and seven three-pointers, backed by Josh Hart's 18 rebounds and Jalen Brunson's 26 points. Alec Burks, who had played one minute this postseason coming into game 3, provided 14 points off the bench, while Brunson's potential game-tying three-point attempt barely grazed the rim, securing the Pacers' victory.

ABC

May 12
3:30 pm

Recap

New York Knicks 89, Indiana Pacers 121
Scoring by quarter: 14–34, 27–35, 22–32, 26–20
Pts: Alec Burks 20; Rebs: Achiuwa, Sims 6 each Asts: Jalen Brunson 5	Pts: Tyrese Haliburton 20; Rebs: Aaron Nesmith 12; Asts: T. J. McConnell 10
Series tied, 2–2

Gainbridge Fieldhouse, Indianapolis, IN
Attendance: 17,274
Referees: Tony Brothers, Ben Taylor, Ed Malloy

Indiana jumped out to a 20 point lead during the first quarter, and never looked back, leading by as many as 43 points in the blowout win to tie the series. The Pacers shot 57% from the field, hitting 14 threes, led by Tyrese Haliburton's 20 points, six rebounds, and five assists as well as Aaron Nesmith's 12 rebounds. Off the bench for Indiana, T. J. McConnell recorded 15 points and 10 assists with Obi Toppin providing 14 points. The Knicks struggled all game, shooting 34% from the field and 19% from three, with Jalen Brunson being the only starter to score in double digits with 18 points on 6-17 shooting and 0-5 from three. Off the Knicks' bench, Alec Burks scored 20 points and Miles McBride provided 16 points.

TNT/TruTV

May 14
8:00 pm

Recap

Indiana Pacers 91, New York Knicks 121
Scoring by quarter: 32–38, 22–31, 21–27, 16–25
Pts: Pascal Siakam 22; Rebs: Pascal Siakam 8 Asts: Haliburton, McConnell 5 each	Pts: Jalen Brunson 44; Rebs: Isaiah Hartenstein 17; Asts: Jalen Brunson 7
New York leads series, 3–2

Madison Square Garden, New York, NY
Attendance: 19,812
Referees: James Williams, Scott Foster, Karl Lane, Gediminas Petraitis

After suffering a demoralizing blowout loss in game 4, the Knicks responded with a 30-point victory to move one win away from their first conference finals appearance in 24 years. Jalen Brunson led the charge with 44 points and seven assists, marking his fifth 40-point game of the postseason. Josh Hart recorded 18 points and 11 rebounds, while Miles McBride and Alec Burks combined for 35 points on 8-of-15 from beyond the arc. New York dominated the glass, outrebounding Indiana 53–29 and securing 20 offensive rebounds (with 12 of them coming from Isaiah Hartenstein) that led to 26 second-chance points. Pascal Siakam had 22 points, Myles Turner scored 16, and Tyrese Haliburton finished with 13 points on nine shot attempts.

ESPN

May 17
8:30 pm

Recap

New York Knicks 103, Indiana Pacers 116
Scoring by quarter: 30–29, 21–32, 24–27, 28–28
Pts: Jalen Brunson 31; Rebs: Achiuwa, Hart 8 each Asts: Isaiah Hartenstein 6	Pts: Pascal Siakam 25; Rebs: Myles Turner 8 Asts: Tyrese Haliburton 9
Series tied, 3–3

Gainbridge Fieldhouse, Indianapolis, IN
Attendance: 17,274
Referees: Zach Zarba, John Goble, David Guthrie

Pascal Siakam finished with 25 points and seven rebounds, Myles Turner posted 17 points and eight rebounds, and the Pacers improved to 6–0 at home this postseason to force a decisive game 7. Haliburton, Nembhard, and McConnell each scored 15 points and combined for an assist-turnover ratio of 19 to 2. Indiana also held a 47–35 rebounding edge and dominated the Knicks in the paint 62–38, as they led by as much as 23 points in the second half. Jalen Brunson tallied 31 points and five assists on 11-of-26 from the field, but missed his final 11 shots in the first half. Miles McBride and Donte DiVincenzo scored 20 and 17 points, respectively, while Josh Hart was forced out of the game due to an abdominal injury.

ABC

May 19
3:30 pm

Recap

Indiana Pacers 130, New York Knicks 109
Scoring by quarter: 39–27, 31–28, 31–29, 29–25
Pts: Tyrese Haliburton 26; Rebs: three players 5 each (Note: Nembhard, Sheppard, and Turner); Asts: T. J. McConnell 7	Pts: Donte DiVincenzo 39; Rebs: Hart, Hartenstein 8 each Asts: Jalen Brunson 9
Indiana wins series, 4–3

Madison Square Garden, New York, NY
Attendance: 19,812
Referees: Marc Davis, James Capers, Bill Kennedy

After the home team won the first six games, the Pacers went on the road and shot a playoff record 67.1% from the field to advance to their first conference finals in ten years. Indiana led by 22 points in the second quarter, and although the Knicks got within six in the second half, the Pacers ultimately prevailed and overcame an 0–2 series deficit for the first time ever. Tyrese Haliburton had 26 points, while Pascal Siakam and Myles Turner recorded 20 and 17 points, respectively. Andrew Nembhard and Aaron Nesmith combined for 39 points on 16-of-18 shooting, and T. J. McConnell tallied seven assists. A hobbled OG Anunoby and Josh Hart started for New York, but Anunoby exited in the first quarter, and Jalen Brunson (17 points) left in the second half with a broken hand, adding to the Knicks' injury woes. Donte DiVincenzo scored 39 points on 9-of-15 from deep, and Alec Burks added 26 points on 8-of-13 shooting.

Regular-season series
Indiana won 2–1 in the regular-season series

December 30, 2023

Recap

New York Knicks 126, Indiana Pacers 140

Gainbridge Fieldhouse, Indianapolis, IN

February 1, 2024

Recap

Indiana Pacers 105, New York Knicks 109

Madison Square Garden, New York, NY

February 10, 2024

Recap

Indiana Pacers 125, New York Knicks 111

Madison Square Garden, New York, NY

This was the eighth playoff meeting between these two teams, with the Pacers winning four of the first seven meetings.

Previous playoff series
Indiana leads 4–3 in all-time playoff series

1993

New York Knicks 3, Indiana Pacers 1

1993 Eastern Conference First Round

1994

New York Knicks 4, Indiana Pacers 3

1994 Eastern Conference finals

1995

Indiana Pacers 4, New York Knicks 3

1995 Eastern Conference semifinals

1998

Indiana Pacers 4, New York Knicks 1

1998 Eastern Conference semifinals

1999

Indiana Pacers 2, New York Knicks 4

1999 Eastern Conference finals

2000

Indiana Pacers 4, New York Knicks 2

2000 Eastern Conference finals

2013

New York Knicks 2, Indiana Pacers 4

2013 Eastern Conference semifinals

=== Western Conference semifinals ===
==== (1) Oklahoma City Thunder vs. (5) Dallas Mavericks ====
TNT/TruTV

May 7
9:30 pm (8:30 pm CDT)

Recap

Dallas Mavericks 95, Oklahoma City Thunder 117
Scoring by quarter: 23–23, 30–39, 26–27, 16–28
Pts: Kyrie Irving 20; Rebs: Daniel Gafford 11; Asts: Luka Dončić 9	Pts: Shai Gilgeous-Alexander 29; Rebs: Gilgeous-Alexander, Williams 9 each Asts: Shai Gilgeous-Alexander 9
Oklahoma City leads series, 1–0

Paycom Center, Oklahoma City, OK
Attendance: 18,203
Referees: Tony Brothers, Ben Taylor, Brian Forte

Shai Gilgeous-Alexander had 29 points, nine rebounds, and nine assists as the Thunder routed the Mavericks 117–95 to secure the series opener. Chet Holmgren added 19 points and seven rebounds, Jalen Williams scored 10 of his 18 points in the fourth quarter, while Aaron Wiggins scored 12 of his 16 points in the first half to help Oklahoma City improve to 5–0 this postseason. Dallas cut the Thunder lead to nine with 8:29 left in the fourth quarter, but Oklahoma City responded with a 15–2 run that prompted the Mavericks to empty their bench. Kyrie Irving scored 20 points and Daniel Gafford posted a double-double with five blocks, while Luka Dončić struggled, finishing with 19 points and five turnovers on 6-of-19 from the field.

ESPN

May 9
9:30 pm (8:30 pm CDT)

Recap

Dallas Mavericks 119, Oklahoma City Thunder 110
Scoring by quarter: 36–32, 32–30, 31–27, 20–21
Pts: Dončić, Washington 29 each Rebs: P. J. Washington 11; Asts: Kyrie Irving 11	Pts: Shai Gilgeous-Alexander 33; Rebs: Shai Gilgeous-Alexander 12; Asts: Shai Gilgeous-Alexander 8
Series tied, 1–1

Paycom Center, Oklahoma City, OK
Attendance: 18,203
Referees: Scott Foster, James Williams, Ed Malloy

Led by Luka Dončić and P. J. Washington's 29 points each, the Mavericks improved to 3–0 following a loss this postseason and leveled the series at one game apiece. Maintaining control throughout the first half, Dallas briefly lost the lead in the third quarter but regained control with a 15–2 run, as the Thunder never got closer than four points. Dončić and Washington combined to shoot 12-of-19 (63%) from beyond the arc, while Kyrie Irving tallied 11 assists and Tim Hardaway Jr. provided a spark off the bench with 17 points. Shai Gilgeous-Alexander led Oklahoma City with 33 points, 12 boards, and eight assists, while Jalen Williams added 20 points for the Thunder, who allowed more than 100 points for the first time this postseason.

ABC

May 11
3:30 pm (2:30 pm CDT)

Recap

Oklahoma City Thunder 101, Dallas Mavericks 105
Scoring by quarter: 23–26, 29–25, 26–31, 23–23
Pts: Shai Gilgeous-Alexander 31; Rebs: Shai Gilgeous-Alexander 10; Asts: Jalen Williams 8	Pts: P. J. Washington 27; Rebs: Luka Dončić 15; Asts: Kyrie Irving 7
Dallas leads series, 2–1

American Airlines Center, Dallas, TX
Attendance: 20,325
Referees: John Goble, Bill Kennedy, Gediminas Petraitis

The Mavericks, led by their trio of Dončić, Irving, and Washington, protected homecourt and secured a 2–1 series lead over the top-seeded Thunder. Dončić contributed 22 points and 15 boards while Irving finished with 22 points and seven assists, as the pair made key plays down the stretch. Washington scored 27 points and spearheaded a 16–0 run in the third quarter that gave Dallas a lead they wouldn't relinquish, while rookie Dereck Lively II, being fouled intentionally in the fourth quarter, finished 8-of-12 on free throws. Shai Gilgeous-Alexander tallied 31 points and five blocks, but shot 1-of-6 and committed three turnovers in the final quarter, while Jalen Williams and Chet Holmgren finished with 16 and 13 points, respectively.

TNT/TruTV

May 13
9:30 pm (8:30 pm CDT)

Recap

Oklahoma City Thunder 100, Dallas Mavericks 96
Scoring by quarter: 20–30, 23–24, 22–15, 35–27
Pts: Shai Gilgeous-Alexander 34; Rebs: Holmgren, Williams 9 each Asts: Jalen Williams 6	Pts: P. J. Washington 21; Rebs: Dončić, Washington 12 each Asts: Luka Dončić 10
Series tied, 2–2

American Airlines Center, Dallas, TX
Attendance: 20,607
Referees: Zach Zarba, David Guthrie, Curtis Blair

In a critical game 4, Shai Gilgeous-Alexander scored a playoff career-high 34 points and orchestrated a 20–10 run to end the game as the Thunder tied the series. Oklahoma City also got clutch three-pointers from Chet Holmgren (18 points) and Luguentz Dort (17 points), as they surged back from a six-point deficit in the fourth quarter. Despite a triple-double from Luka Dončić, he and Kyrie Irving struggled shooting, combining for 27 points on 10-of-31 (32%) from the field. Derrick Jones Jr. added 17 points and four blocks for the Mavericks, while P. J. Washington posted 21 points and 12 rebounds. Dallas's woes were compounded by missed free throws, shooting just 52% (12-of-23) compared to 95.8% (23-of-24) from the Thunder.

TNT/TruTV

May 15
9:30 pm (8:30 pm CDT)

Recap

Dallas Mavericks 104, Oklahoma City Thunder 92
Scoring by quarter: 24–22, 30–22, 25–23, 25–25
Pts: Luka Dončić 31; Rebs: three players 10 each (Note: Dončić, Lively II, and Washington); Asts: Luka Dončić 11	Pts: Shai Gilgeous-Alexander 30; Rebs: three players 6 each (Note: Dort, Gilgeous-Alexander, and Williams); Asts: Shai Gilgeous-Alexander 8
Dallas leads series, 3–2

Paycom Center, Oklahoma City, OK
Attendance: 18,203
Referees: James Capers, Courtney Kirkland, Jacyn Goble, Kevin Scott

After averaging just 22 points on 39% shooting over the first four games, Luka Dončić delivered a 31-point triple-double and made 12-of-22 shots to give the Mavericks a pivotal 3–2 series lead heading back to Dallas. On the road facing a hostile crowd, the Mavericks trailed by six early but seized the lead midway through the first quarter and maintained it for the rest of the game. Derrick Jones Jr. recorded 19 points on 7-of-9 shooting, Kyrie Irving added 12 points, and both P. J. Washington and Dereck Lively II notched double-doubles. Shai Gilgeous-Alexander scored 30 points and dished out eight assists, but no one else on the Thunder scored more than 13 points, as his teammates combined to shoot 8-of-36 (22%) from deep.

ABC

May 18
8:00 pm (7:00 pm CDT)

Recap

Oklahoma City Thunder 116, Dallas Mavericks 117
Scoring by quarter: 30–23, 34–25, 26–35, 26–34
Pts: Shai Gilgeous-Alexander 36; Rebs: Jalen Williams 9 Asts: Gilgeous-Alexander, Williams 8 each	Pts: Luka Dončić 29; Rebs: Dereck Lively II 15; Asts: Luka Dončić 10
Dallas wins series, 4–2

American Airlines Center, Dallas, TX
Attendance: 20,555
Referees: Tony Brothers, Josh Tiven, Mitchell Ervin

The Mavericks overcame a 17-point second-half deficit to reach their second conference finals in three years. Luka Dončić scored 29 points and logged his third straight triple-double, Kyrie Irving and Derrick Jones Jr. each scored 22 points, while P. J. Washington scored all nine of his points late in the fourth quarter, including go-ahead free throws with 2.5 seconds left. Dereck Lively II also grabbed 15 boards for Dallas, who shot 16-of-34 (47%) from beyond the arc and outrebounded the Thunder 47–31. Shai Gilgeous-Alexander posted a playoff-high 36 points, while Jalen Williams and Chet Holmgren had 22 and 21 points, respectively. Holmgren briefly put Oklahoma City ahead on an alley-oop with 20 seconds left, but Gilgeous-Alexander fouled Washington on a three-point shot. The Thunder lost their final timeout challenging the call, leaving them with a desperate half-court heave that missed as time expired.

Regular-season series
Oklahoma City won 3–1 in the regular-season series

December 2, 2023

Recap

Oklahoma City Thunder 126, Dallas Mavericks 120

American Airlines Center, Dallas, TX

February 10, 2024

Recap

Oklahoma City Thunder 111, Dallas Mavericks 146

American Airlines Center, Dallas, TX

March 14, 2024

Recap

Dallas Mavericks 119, Oklahoma City Thunder 126

Paycom Center, Oklahoma City, OK

April 14, 2024

Recap

Dallas Mavericks 86, Oklahoma City Thunder 135

Paycom Center, Oklahoma City, OK

This was the sixth playoff meeting between these two teams, and the fourth since the Seattle SuperSonics relocated to Oklahoma City in 2008, with the Thunder winning three of the first five meetings.

Previous playoff series
Oklahoma City leads 3–2 in all-time playoff series

1984

Dallas Mavericks 3, Seattle SuperSonics 2

1984 Western Conference First Round

1987

Dallas Mavericks 1, Seattle SuperSonics 3

1987 Western Conference First Round

2011

Dallas Mavericks 4, Oklahoma City Thunder 1

2011 Western Conference finals

2012

Oklahoma City Thunder 4, Dallas Mavericks 0

2012 Western Conference First Round

2016

Oklahoma City Thunder 4, Dallas Mavericks 1

2016 Western Conference First Round

==== (2) Denver Nuggets vs. (3) Minnesota Timberwolves ====
TNT/TruTV

May 4
7:00 pm (5:00 pm MDT)

Recap

Minnesota Timberwolves 106, Denver Nuggets 99
Scoring by quarter: 23–25, 17–19, 33–27, 33–28
Pts: Anthony Edwards 43; Rebs: Rudy Gobert 13; Asts: Mike Conley 10	Pts: Nikola Jokić 32; Rebs: Nikola Jokić 8 Asts: Nikola Jokić 9
Minnesota leads series, 1–0

Ball Arena, Denver, CO
Attendance: 19,915
Referees: James Capers, Courtney Kirkland, Justin Van Duyne

In the Timberwolves' first conference semifinal game in 20 years, Anthony Edwards scored a franchise playoff-record 43 points, leading Minnesota to a 1–0 series lead over the defending champions. Edwards shot 17-of-29 (59%) from the field, while Naz Reid came off the bench and scored 14 of his 16 points in the fourth quarter, igniting an 18–7 run that allowed Minnesota to pull away. Mike Conley tallied 14 points and 10 assists, while Karl-Anthony Towns scored 20 points on 8-of-13 shooting as the Timberwolves shot 71% from the floor in the second half. Nikola Jokić had 32 points but shot under 50% from the field and finished with an assist-turnover ratio of 9 to 7, while Jamal Murray scored all 17 of his points after halftime.

TNT/TruTV

May 6
10:00 pm (8:00 pm MDT)

Recap

Minnesota Timberwolves 106, Denver Nuggets 80
Scoring by quarter: 28–20, 33–15, 21–25, 24–20
Pts: Edwards, Towns 27 each Rebs: Karl-Anthony Towns 12; Asts: Kyle Anderson 8	Pts: Aaron Gordon 20; Rebs: Nikola Jokić 16; Asts: Nikola Jokić 8
Minnesota leads series, 2–0

Ball Arena, Denver, CO
Attendance: 19,942
Referees: Marc Davis, David Guthrie, Pat Fraher

The Timberwolves stunned the Nuggets in the first half, as they jumped out to a 26-point halftime lead that they rode to take a commanding 2–0 series lead back to Minneapolis. Without Rudy Gobert, the Timberwolves still held Denver to 80 points, their fewest in any game since 2020. Anthony Edwards and Karl-Anthony Towns combined for 54 points and shot 21-of-32 from the field, while Kyle Anderson, replacing Gobert in the starting lineup, had seven offensive rebounds and eight assists. Aaron Gordon led the Nuggets with 20 points, while Nikola Jokić notched 16 rebounds on 5-of-13 shooting. The rest of Denver's starters struggled, particularly Jamal Murray, finishing with eight points and four turnovers on 3-of-18 from the field.

ESPN

May 10
9:30 pm (8:30 pm CDT)

Recap

Denver Nuggets 117, Minnesota Timberwolves 90
Scoring by quarter: 28–20, 28–21, 37–25, 24–24
Pts: Jokić, Murray 24 each Rebs: Nikola Jokić 14; Asts: Nikola Jokić 9	Pts: Anthony Edwards 19; Rebs: Conley, Edwards 6 each Asts: Mike Conley 6
Minnesota leads series, 2–1

Target Center, Minneapolis, MN
Attendance: 19,733
Referees: Tony Brothers, Josh Tiven, Jacyn Goble

Trailing 2–0 in the series, the Nuggets bounced back with a dominant 117–90 road victory and handed Minnesota their first loss of the postseason. Jamal Murray, who scored two total points in the first half coming into game 3, had 18 of his 24 points in the first two quarters and set the tone for Denver, who led by as much as 34 points. Nikola Jokić shot over 50% from the field and finished an assist shy of a triple-double, while Michael Porter Jr. finished with 21 points as the Nuggets knocked down 14-of-29 (48%) three-pointers. Anthony Edwards was held to under 25 points for the first time in five games, while Karl-Anthony Towns made 4-of-5 three-pointers for the Timberwolves, who endured their largest defeat of the season.

TNT

May 12
8:00 pm (7:00 pm CDT)

Recap

Denver Nuggets 115, Minnesota Timberwolves 107
Scoring by quarter: 29–24, 35–25, 26–30, 25–28
Pts: Nikola Jokić 35; Rebs: Gordon, Jokić 7 each Asts: Jamal Murray 8	Pts: Anthony Edwards 44; Rebs: Rudy Gobert 14; Asts: Mike Conley 9
Series tied, 2–2

Target Center, Minneapolis, MN
Attendance: 19,583
Referees: Scott Foster, Kevin Scott, Karl Lane

Despite Anthony Edwards setting a franchise playoff record with 44 points, Nikola Jokić and Aaron Gordon led the Nuggets as they evened the series going back to Denver. Jokić recorded 35 points, 7 rebounds, 7 assists and 3 steals making 15-of-26 shots, while Gordon made 11-of-12 for 27 points. Jamal Murray added 19 points and 8 assists, making a 56-foot buzzer-beating half-courter as the Nuggets led by 15 points going into halftime. Edwards made 16-of-25 shots and made five three-pointers. All Timberwolves starters plus Naz Reid scored in double-digits, although Karl-Anthony Towns shot 1-of-10 in the first half, ultimately finishing on 5-of-18 from the field. Towns and Rudy Gobert led the game's rebounding with 12 and 14 boards respectively.

TNT/TruTV

May 14
10:30 pm (8:30 pm MDT)

Recap

Minnesota Timberwolves 97, Denver Nuggets 112
Scoring by quarter: 26–28, 18–22, 30–38, 23–24
Pts: Karl-Anthony Towns 23; Rebs: Rudy Gobert 11; Asts: Anthony Edwards 9	Pts: Nikola Jokić 40; Rebs: Aaron Gordon 10; Asts: Nikola Jokić 13
Denver leads series, 3–2

Ball Arena, Denver, CO
Attendance: 19,992
Referees: Bill Kennedy, Ed Malloy, John Goble

Against the number one ranked defense in the league, Nikola Jokić shot 15-of-22 (68%) from the field and finished with 40 points, 13 assists, and zero turnovers as the Nuggets took a 3–2 series lead after falling behind 0–2. Alongside Jokić's stellar performance, Jamal Murray had 16 points on 50% shooting, Aaron Gordon had a double-double, and Kentavious Caldwell-Pope made 4-of-5 three-pointers for Denver. Rudy Gobert tallied 18 points and 11 rebounds on 100% shooting, while Karl-Anthony Towns led Minnesota with 23 points. However, Anthony Edwards started off slow, missing 8-of-9 shots in the first half and ultimately finishing with just 18 points as the Timberwolves suffered their first three-game losing streak of the season.

ESPN

May 16
8:30 pm (7:30 pm CDT)

Recap

Denver Nuggets 70, Minnesota Timberwolves 115
Scoring by quarter: 14–31, 26–28, 21–27, 9–29
Pts: Nikola Jokić 22; Rebs: Nikola Jokić 9 Asts: Jamal Murray 5	Pts: Anthony Edwards 27; Rebs: Rudy Gobert 14; Asts: Conley, Towns 5 each
Series tied, 3–3

Target Center, Minneapolis, MN
Attendance: 19,187
Referees: James Williams, Marc Davis, Tyler Ford

Facing elimination, the Timberwolves held the defending champions to the fewest points scored by any team in six years and forced a game 7. Anthony Edwards posted 27 points with a +43 plus-minus, Jaden McDaniels added 21 points on 8-of-10 shooting, and Mike Conley contributed 13 points in his return from injury. Rudy Gobert, Karl-Anthony Towns, and Naz Reid combined for 38 boards, helping Minnesota outrebound Denver 62–43. The Timberwolves' bench outscored the Nuggets' reserves 36–9, including a 24–0 run in the fourth quarter that pushed the lead to 50 points. Nikola Jokić and Aaron Gordon combined for 34 points on 50% shooting, while the rest of the Nuggets shot 22%, with Jamal Murray missing 14-of-18 shots.

TNT/TruTV

May 19
8:00 pm (6:00 pm MDT)

Recap

Minnesota Timberwolves 98, Denver Nuggets 90
Scoring by quarter: 19–24, 19–29, 28–14, 32–23
Pts: McDaniels, Towns 23 each Rebs: Karl-Anthony Towns 12; Asts: Anthony Edwards 7	Pts: Jamal Murray 35; Rebs: Nikola Jokić 19; Asts: Nikola Jokić 7
Minnesota wins series, 4–3

Ball Arena, Denver, CO
Attendance: 20,022
Referees: Scott Foster, David Guthrie, Curtis Blair

On the 20th anniversary of their first conference finals berth, the Timberwolves rallied from a 20-point second-half deficit to eliminate the defending champions on the road. Although Jamal Murray's 24 first-half points gave the Nuggets a 15-point halftime lead, Minnesota surged back, as they closed the third quarter with a 28–9 run and took the lead in the fourth. Karl-Anthony Towns tallied 23 points and 12 boards, and Jaden McDaniels notched 23 points on 70% shooting as the Timberwolves finished with six players in double figures. Anthony Edwards, initially slow, finished strong with 16 points, eight boards, seven assists, and hit a three-pointer that pushed Minnesota's lead to 10 with three minutes left. Despite a combined 69 points from Murray and Jokić on 55 shot attempts, no one else on the Nuggets scored more than seven points, as Denver was held to under 100 points in all four losses this series.

Regular-season series
Tied 2–2 in the regular-season series

November 1, 2023

Recap

Denver Nuggets 89, Minnesota Timberwolves 110

Target Center, Minneapolis, MN

March 19, 2024

Recap

Denver Nuggets 115, Minnesota Timberwolves 112

Target Center, Minneapolis, MN

March 29, 2024

Recap

Minnesota Timberwolves 111, Denver Nuggets 98

Ball Arena, Denver, CO

April 10, 2024

Recap

Minnesota Timberwolves 107, Denver Nuggets 116

Ball Arena, Denver, CO

Previous playoff series
Tied 1–1 in all-time playoff series

2004

Minnesota Timberwolves 4, Denver Nuggets 1

2004 Western Conference First Round

2023

Denver Nuggets 4, Minnesota Timberwolves 1

2023 Western Conference First Round

This was the third playoff meeting between these two teams, with each team previously winning one series by four games to one.

== Conference finals ==
Note: Times are EDT (UTC−4) as listed by the NBA. If the venue is located in a different time zone, the local time is also given.

=== Eastern Conference finals ===
==== (1) Boston Celtics vs. (6) Indiana Pacers ====
ESPN/ ESPN2

May 21
8:00 pm

Recap

Indiana Pacers 128, Boston Celtics 133 (OT)
Scoring by quarter: 31–34, 33–30, 29–30, 24–23, Overtime: 11–16
Pts: Tyrese Haliburton 25; Rebs: Pascal Siakam 12; Asts: Tyrese Haliburton 10	Pts: Jayson Tatum 36; Rebs: Jayson Tatum 12; Asts: Derrick White 9
Boston leads series, 1–0

TD Garden, Boston, MA
Attendance: 19,156
Referees: Tony Brothers, David Guthrie, Tyler Ford

In a matchup between the top two scoring teams from the regular season, the Celtics rallied behind Jayson Tatum's 36 points and Jaylen Brown's clutch three-pointer to secure the series opener in overtime. Boston opened the game on a 12–0 run, but the Pacers fought back and eventually led by three with 10 seconds remaining. However, Indiana turned it over after failing to inbound the ball, and Brown hit a contested three-pointer to tie the game at 117. Tatum, who also finished with 12 rebounds and four assists, then orchestrated a personal 6–0 run in overtime to put the Celtics ahead for good. Brown finished with 26 points, Jrue Holiday scored a season-high 28 points, and Derrick White dished out nine assists. The Pacers had seven players finish in double figures, but struggled with 22 turnovers, which led to 32 points for Boston. Tyrese Haliburton recorded 25 points and 10 assists, while Pascal Siakam and Myles Turner combined for 47 points and 22 rebounds.

ESPN

May 23
8:00 pm

Recap

Indiana Pacers 110, Boston Celtics 126
Scoring by quarter: 27–25, 24–32, 29–36, 30–33
Pts: Pascal Siakam 28; Rebs: three players 5 each (Note: Jackson, McConnell and Siakam); Asts: Tyrese Haliburton 8	Pts: Jaylen Brown 40; Rebs: Al Horford 10; Asts: Jrue Holiday 10
Boston leads series, 2–0

TD Garden, Boston, MA
Attendance: 19,156
Referees: Scott Foster, James Williams, Sean Wright

After losing game 2 at home against the Miami Heat and Cleveland Cavaliers, the Celtics, behind Jaylen Brown's 40 points, protected their home court to take a commanding 2–0 series lead. Brown, matching his playoff career-high and shooting 14-of-27 from the field, spearheaded a 20–0 run in the first half that gave Boston a lead they never relinquished. The Pacers closed the gap to two points in the third quarter, but the Celtics countered with a 16–5 run to maintain a double-digit lead. Jayson Tatum and Derrick White each scored 23 points, while Jrue Holiday shot 6-of-7 from the field and dished out 10 assists. Pascal Siakam led Indiana with 28 points on 13-of-17 shooting, while Tyrese Haliburton had 10 points and eight assists before departing in the third quarter with hamstring soreness. Andrew Nembhard provided 16 points, but center Myles Turner finished with eight points, four rebounds, and four turnovers.

ABC

May 25
8:30 pm

Recap

Boston Celtics 114, Indiana Pacers 111
Scoring by quarter: 32–31, 25–38, 24–21, 33–21
Pts: Jayson Tatum 36; Rebs: Jayson Tatum 10; Asts: Jayson Tatum 8	Pts: Andrew Nembhard 32; Rebs: Myles Turner 10; Asts: Andrew Nembhard 9
Boston leads series, 3–0

Gainbridge Fieldhouse, Indianapolis, IN
Attendance: 17,274
Referees: Marc Davis, John Goble, Courtney Kirkland

Trailing by eight with under 2:30 remaining, the Celtics closed the game on a 13–2 run and moved one win away from their second NBA Finals appearance in three seasons. After trailing by as much as 18 in the third quarter, Jrue Holiday gave Boston their first lead of the second half with a three-point play in the final minute, followed by a crucial steal and two free throws to secure the victory. Jayson Tatum had 36 points, 10 rebounds, eight assists, and zero turnovers. Jaylen Brown added 24 points, and Al Horford made 7-of-12 three-pointers. Derrick White also tallied four blocks and seven assists as the Celtics improved to 5–0 on the road this postseason and snapped the Pacers' 11-game home winning streak. Without All-Star Tyrese Haliburton, Andrew Nembhard scored a career-high 32 points and nine assists, T. J. McConnell added 23 points and nine rebounds, and both Pascal Siakam and Myles Turner scored 22 points.

ESPN/ ESPN2

May 27
8:00 pm

Recap

Boston Celtics 105, Indiana Pacers 102
Scoring by quarter: 29–27, 29–30, 22–26, 25–19
Pts: Jaylen Brown 29; Rebs: Jayson Tatum 13; Asts: Jayson Tatum 8	Pts: Andrew Nembhard 24; Rebs: Pascal Siakam 10; Asts: Andrew Nembhard 10
Boston wins series, 4–0

Gainbridge Fieldhouse, Indianapolis, IN
Attendance: 17,274
Referees: Zach Zarba, James Capers, Pat Fraher

The Celtics' 7–0 run in the final 3:30 secured their first sweep in the conference finals since 1986 and their 23rd NBA finals appearance in franchise history. Derrick White, previously struggling with his three-point shooting (1-for-8), knocked down a game-winning three-pointer with 44 seconds left, finishing with 16 points, five steals, and three blocks. After a missed three-pointer from Andrew Nembhard with 31 seconds remaining, the Pacers forced Jayson Tatum into a missed shot, but an offensive rebound by Jrue Holiday, who finished with 17 points and nine boards, secured the Celtics' seventh consecutive playoff win. Jaylen Brown finished with 29 points and three steals, while Tatum posted 26 points, 13 rebounds, and eight assists. Indiana, missing Tyrese Haliburton for the second straight game, dropped to 1–8 all-time in the conference finals and was swept despite holding a lead or being tied in the final minute in three of the four games this series. Nembhard tallied 24 points and 10 assists, Pascal Siakam notched a double-double, and T. J. McConnell produced 15 points off the bench.

- Brown was awarded the third annual Eastern Conference finals MVP, averaging 29.8 points, 5.0 rebounds, and 2.0 steals on 51.7% from the field, 37% from beyond the arc, and 65.5% from the free-throw line.

Regular-season series
Boston won 3–2 in the regular-season series

November 1, 2023

Recap

Indiana Pacers 104, Boston Celtics 155

TD Garden, Boston, MA

December 4, 2023

Recap

Boston Celtics 112, Indiana Pacers 122

Gainbridge Fieldhouse, Indianapolis, IN

January 6, 2024

Recap

Boston Celtics 118, Indiana Pacers 101

Gainbridge Fieldhouse, Indianapolis, IN

January 8, 2024

Recap

Boston Celtics 131, Indiana Pacers 133

Gainbridge Fieldhouse, Indianapolis, IN

January 30, 2024

Recap

Indiana Pacers 124, Boston Celtics 129

TD Garden, Boston, MA

This was the seventh playoff meeting between these two teams, with the Celtics winning four of the first six meetings.

Previous playoff series
Boston leads 4–2 in all-time playoff series

1991

Boston Celtics 3, Indiana Pacers 2

1991 Eastern Conference First Round

1992

Boston Celtics 3, Indiana Pacers 0

1992 Eastern Conference First Round

2003

Indiana Pacers 2, Boston Celtics 4

2003 Eastern Conference First Round

2004

Indiana Pacers 4, Boston Celtics 0

2004 Eastern Conference First Round

2005

Boston Celtics 3, Indiana Pacers 4

2005 Eastern Conference First Round

2019

Boston Celtics 4, Indiana Pacers 0

2019 Eastern Conference First Round

=== Western Conference finals ===
==== (3) Minnesota Timberwolves vs. (5) Dallas Mavericks ====
TNT/TruTV

May 22
8:30 pm (7:30 pm CDT)

Recap

Dallas Mavericks 108, Minnesota Timberwolves 105
Scoring by quarter: 27–33, 32–29, 23–21, 26–22
Pts: Luka Dončić 33; Rebs: Dereck Lively II 11; Asts: Luka Dončić 8	Pts: Jaden McDaniels 24; Rebs: Anthony Edwards 11; Asts: Anthony Edwards 8
Dallas leads series, 1–0

Target Center, Minneapolis, MN
Attendance: 19,433
Referees: Marc Davis, Kevin Scott, Mark Lindsay

Kyrie Irving scored 24 of his 30 points in the first half, and Luka Dončić delivered 15 of his 33 points in the fourth quarter to lead the Mavericks to a 1–0 series lead. In a back-and-forth contest, Dallas trailed by four with under 3:30 remaining, but a decisive 8–0 run over the next three minutes, highlighted by a go-ahead three-pointer by P. J. Washington, secured the victory. Despite a dismal 6-of-25 (24%) three-point shooting night, the Mavericks dominated the paint 62–38 and made 16-of-17 free throws, compared to 61% from the Timberwolves. Rookie Dereck Lively II had 11 boards on 4-of-4 shooting, while Dončić tallied eight assists and three steals. For Minnesota, Jaden McDaniels made 6-of-9 three-pointers and recorded over 20 points for the third consecutive game, but Anthony Edwards and Karl-Anthony Towns struggled to find their rhythm, combining for 35 points on 12-of-36 (33%) from the field.

TNT/TruTV

May 24
8:30 pm (7:30 pm CDT)

Recap

Dallas Mavericks 109, Minnesota Timberwolves 108
Scoring by quarter: 26–32, 22–28, 31–26, 30–22
Pts: Luka Dončić 32; Rebs: Luka Dončić 10; Asts: Luka Dončić 13	Pts: Naz Reid 23; Rebs: Rudy Gobert 10; Asts: Anthony Edwards 7
Dallas leads series, 2–0

Target Center, Minneapolis, MN
Attendance: 19,636
Referees: Zach Zarba, Josh Tiven, Mitchell Ervin

Luka Dončić recorded his fourth triple-double in five games and drained a game-winning three-pointer over the Defensive Player of the Year (Rudy Gobert), securing a 2–0 series lead for the Mavericks. Trailing by as much as 18 late in the second quarter, the Mavericks shot 60.5% from the floor (23-for-38) after halftime, with Kyrie Irving scoring 13 of his 20 points in the fourth quarter. Dončić's 13 assists primarily went to centers Daniel Gafford and Dereck Lively II, who combined for 30 points on 14-of-16 shooting. Following Dončić's go-ahead three with 3.0 seconds left, Naz Reid, who was previously 7-of-8 from deep, missed a potential buzzer-beating three for the Timberwolves. Gobert notched a double-double, while Mike Conley added 18 points, but the All-Star duo of Edwards and Towns continued to struggle, as they combined to shoot 9-for-33 (27%) from the field, with Towns benched during the fourth quarter.

TNT/TruTV

May 26
8:00 pm (7:00 pm CDT)

Recap

Minnesota Timberwolves 107, Dallas Mavericks 116
Scoring by quarter: 28–33, 24–27, 35–27, 20–29
Pts: Anthony Edwards 26; Rebs: Karl-Anthony Towns 11; Asts: Anthony Edwards 9	Pts: Dončić, Irving 33 each Rebs: P. J. Washington 8 Asts: Luka Dončić 5
Dallas leads series, 3–0

American Airlines Center, Dallas, TX
Attendance: 20,511
Referees: Tony Brothers, Ben Taylor, Curtis Blair

For the third consecutive game, Luka Dončić and Kyrie Irving delivered in the clutch for the Mavericks, finishing with 33 points each and leading a decisive 14–3 run to conclude the game as Dallas took a commanding 3–0 series lead. Dončić and Irving outscored the Timberwolves in the fourth quarter 21–20, as the duo shot 8-of-10 from the field. Dončić also recorded five steals, while P. J. Washington contributed 16 points, eight rebounds, and a go-ahead three-pointer for the Mavericks, who shot 14-of-28 from beyond the arc and 55.9% from the field. Anthony Edwards finished with 26 points, nine boards, and nine assists on an improved 11-of-24 shooting for Minnesota, but took just three shot attempts in the final quarter. Mike Conley and Jaden McDaniels added 16 and 15 points, respectively, while Karl-Anthony Towns shot 0-of-8 from deep, lowering his series three-point shooting percentage to 13.6% (3-for-22).

TNT/TruTV

May 28
8:30 pm (7:30 pm CDT)

Recap

Minnesota Timberwolves 105, Dallas Mavericks 100
Scoring by quarter: 27–20, 22–29, 29–24, 27–27
Pts: Anthony Edwards 29; Rebs: Edwards, Gobert 10 each Asts: Anthony Edwards 9	Pts: Luka Dončić 28; Rebs: Luka Dončić 15; Asts: Luka Dončić 10
Dallas leads series, 3–1

American Airlines Center, Dallas, TX
Attendance: 20,477
Referees: Scott Foster, Bill Kennedy, Ed Malloy

On the verge of getting swept, the Timberwolves staved off elimination when Karl-Anthony Towns scored 20 of his 25 points in the second half and knocked down three critical three-pointers down the stretch to force a game 5 in Minneapolis. Anthony Edwards had 29 points, 10 rebounds, and nine assists, while Towns, previously shooting 28% from the field in the series, finished 9-of-13 from the floor and 4-of-5 from beyond the arc. Rudy Gobert recorded another double-double, and Mike Conley tallied 14 points and four steals for Minnesota, who shot 58% in the second half. Daniel Gafford had three blocks on 6-of-6 shooting for the Mavericks, who were without Dereck Lively II due to a head injury from the previous game. Luka Dončić logged 28 points, 15 boards, and 10 assists for his sixth triple-double this postseason, but he and Kyrie Irving shot an inefficient 13-of-39 (33%) from the field, with Irving losing his first closeout game after previously being 14–0.

TNT/TruTV

May 30
8:30 pm (7:30 pm CDT)

Recap

Dallas Mavericks 124, Minnesota Timberwolves 103
Scoring by quarter: 35–19, 34–21, 28–33, 27–30
Pts: Dončić, Irving 36 each Rebs: Luka Dončić 10; Asts: Dončić, Irving 5 each	Pts: Edwards, Towns 28 each Rebs: Karl-Anthony Towns 12; Asts: Anthony Edwards 6
Dallas wins series, 4–1

Target Center, Minneapolis, MN
Attendance: 19,333
Referees: Marc Davis, John Goble, Kevin Scott

Luka Dončić outscored the Timberwolves by himself 20-19 in the first quarter, as Dallas blew out Minnesota to secure their third finals appearance in franchise history, and their first in 13 years. Dončić and Kyrie Irving scored 36 points each on 28-of-49 (57%) from the field as the Mavericks went on a 28-5 run in the first half, building a commanding 69-40 lead by halftime. In his return, Dereck Lively II recorded 8 rebounds, 3 blocks and made all three of his shots, finishing the series with a perfect 16-of-16 shooting. Daniel Gafford and P. J. Washington combined for 23 points. For Minnesota, Anthony Edwards and Karl-Anthony Towns scored 28 points each on a combined 19-of-38 (50%) from the field. Towns recorded a double-double with 12 rebounds, but the rest of Minnesota's starters (Gobert, Conley, and McDaniels) only combined for 24 points. Naz Reid performed poorly with 5 points on 2-of-10 from the field, missing all four of this three-point attempts and led the Timberwolves with three turnovers.

- Dončić was awarded the third annual Western Conference finals MVP, averaging 32.4 points, 9.6 rebounds, and 8.2 assists on 47.3% from the field, 43.4% from beyond the arc, and 84.6% from the free-throw line.

Regular-season series
Minnesota won 3–1 in the regular-season series

December 14, 2023

Recap

Minnesota Timberwolves 119, Dallas Mavericks 101

American Airlines Center, Dallas, TX

December 28, 2023

Recap

Dallas Mavericks 110, Minnesota Timberwolves 118

Target Center, Minneapolis, MN

January 7, 2024

Recap

Minnesota Timberwolves 108, Dallas Mavericks 115

American Airlines Center, Dallas, TX

January 31, 2024

Recap

Dallas Mavericks 87, Minnesota Timberwolves 121

Target Center, Minneapolis, MN

This was the second playoff meeting between these two teams, with the Mavericks winning the first meeting.

Previous playoff series
Dallas leads 1–0 in all-time playoff series

2002

Dallas Mavericks 3, Minnesota Timberwolves 0

2002 Western Conference First Round

== NBA Finals: (E1) Boston Celtics vs. (W5) Dallas Mavericks ==
Note: Times are EDT (UTC−4) as listed by the NBA. If the venue is located in a different time zone, the local time is also given.

ABC

June 6
8:30 pm

Recap

Dallas Mavericks 89, Boston Celtics 107
Scoring by quarter: 20–37, 22–26, 24–23, 23–21
Pts: Luka Dončić 30; Rebs: Luka Dončić 10; Asts: Kyrie Irving 2	Pts: Jaylen Brown 22; Rebs: Jayson Tatum 11; Asts: three players 5 each (Note: Holiday, Tatum and White)
Boston leads series, 1–0

TD Garden, Boston, MA
Attendance: 19,156
Referees: Zach Zarba, Josh Tiven, Courtney Kirkland

ABC

June 9
8:00 pm

Recap

Dallas Mavericks 98, Boston Celtics 105
Scoring by quarter: 28–25, 23–29, 23–29, 24–22
Pts: Luka Dončić 32; Rebs: Luka Dončić 11; Asts: Luka Dončić 11	Pts: Jrue Holiday 26; Rebs: Jrue Holiday 11; Asts: Jayson Tatum 12
Boston leads series, 2–0

TD Garden, Boston, MA
Attendance: 19,156
Referees: Tony Brothers, John Goble, Bill Kennedy

ABC

June 12
8:30 pm (7:30 pm CDT)

Recap

Boston Celtics 106, Dallas Mavericks 99
Scoring by quarter: 30–31, 20–20, 35–19, 21–29
Pts: Jayson Tatum 31; Rebs: Jaylen Brown 8 Asts: Jaylen Brown 8	Pts: Kyrie Irving 35; Rebs: Dereck Lively II 13; Asts: Luka Dončić 6
Boston leads series, 3–0

American Airlines Center, Dallas, TX
Attendance: 20,311
Referees: Marc Davis, James Capers, Kevin Scott

ABC

June 14
8:30 pm (7:30 pm CDT)

Recap

Boston Celtics 84, Dallas Mavericks 122
Scoring by quarter: 21–34, 14–27, 25–31, 24–30
Pts: Jayson Tatum 15; Rebs: Jayson Tatum 5 Asts: Al Horford 4	Pts: Luka Dončić 29; Rebs: Dereck Lively II 12; Asts: Kyrie Irving 6
Boston leads series, 3–1

American Airlines Center, Dallas, TX
Attendance: 20,277
Referees: Scott Foster, David Guthrie, James Williams

ABC

June 17
8:30 pm

Recap

Dallas Mavericks 88, Boston Celtics 106
Scoring by quarter: 18–28, 28–39, 21–19, 21–20
Pts: Luka Dončić 28; Rebs: Luka Dončić 12; Asts: Kyrie Irving 9	Pts: Jayson Tatum 31; Rebs: Jrue Holiday 11; Asts: Jayson Tatum 11
Boston wins series, 4–1

TD Garden, Boston, MA
Attendance: 19,156
Referees: Zach Zarba, John Goble, Bill Kennedy

Regular-season series
Boston won 2–0 in the regular-season series

January 22, 2024

Recap

Boston Celtics 119, Dallas Mavericks 110

American Airlines Center, Dallas, TX

March 1, 2024

Recap

Dallas Mavericks 110, Boston Celtics 138

TD Garden, Boston, MA

This was the first playoff meeting between these two teams.

== Statistical leaders ==
Category	Game high			Average			
Category	Player	Team	High	Player	Team	Avg.	GP
Points	Joel Embiid; Donovan Mitchell	Philadelphia 76ers Cleveland Cavaliers	50	Joel Embiid	Philadelphia 76ers	33.0	6
Rebounds	Anthony Davis	Los Angeles Lakers	23	Anthony Davis	Los Angeles Lakers	15.6	5
Assists	Tyrese Haliburton	Indiana Pacers	16	LeBron James	Los Angeles Lakers	8.8	5
Steals	Kelly Oubre Jr. Luka Dončić; Derrick White	Philadelphia 76ers Dallas Mavericks; Boston Celtics	5	LeBron James	Los Angeles Lakers	2.4	5
Blocks	Chet Holmgren; Evan Mobley (2×); Daniel Gafford (2×); Shai Gilgeous-Alexander	Oklahoma City Thunder; Cleveland Cavaliers; Dallas Mavericks; Oklahoma City Thunder	5	Chet Holmgren	Oklahoma City Thunder	2.5	10

=== Total leaders ===
Points

1. Luka Dončić - 635
2. Kyrie Irving - 487
3. Jayson Tatum - 475
4. Jaylen Brown - 454
5. Anthony Edwards - 441

Rebounds

1. Luka Dončić - 208
2. Jayson Tatum - 184
3. Nikola Jokić - 161
4. Dereck Lively II - 156
5. Josh Hart - 150

Assists

1. Luka Dončić - 178
2. Tyrese Haliburton - 123
3. Jayson Tatum - 119
4. Kyrie Irving - 113
5. Anthony Edwards / Nikola Jokić - 104

Steals

1. Luka Dončić - 41
2. Anthony Edwards - 24
3. Jaylen Brown - 23
4. Kyrie Irving - 23
5. Mike Conley / Jrue Holiday - 21

Blocks

1. Daniel Gafford - 33
2. Evan Mobley - 26
3. Chet Holmgren - 25
4. Myles Turner - 25
5. Derrick White - 23

Minutes

1. Luka Dončić - 900
2. Kyrie Irving - 879
3. P. J. Washington - 785
4. Jayson Tatum - 768
5. Jrue Holiday - 720

== Media coverage ==
ABC, ESPN, TNT, and NBA TV broadcast the playoffs nationally in the United States. For the first time, TruTV simulcast or aired alternate broadcasts of select TNT games. Each team's regional broadcaster also televised local coverage of first-round games, with the exception of weekend games on ABC.

As per the alternating rotation, ESPN/ABC had exclusive coverage of the Eastern Conference finals, while TNT had exclusive coverage of the Western Conference finals. ABC had exclusive coverage of the NBA Finals for the 22nd straight year.

This was the first playoffs in which the streaming service Max had live access to TNT's games on its Bleacher Report Sports Add-on tier. NBA TV games were available on NBA League Pass as part of its normal streaming service for that channel.

== Sponsorship ==
For the third straight year, the playoffs is officially known as the "2024 NBA Playoffs presented by Google Pixel". During the multiyear agreement with Google Pixel, this sponsorship provides the logo branding inside the venues and in official digital properties on-court, as well as commercial inventory during ABC, ESPN, TNT, and NBA TV's telecasts of the playoff games.
