= Bill Kennedy (referee) =

American basketball referee (born 1966)

William Kennedy
- Born: November 10, 1966 (age 60)
- Education: Arizona State University
- Basketball career

Career information
- Position: NBA referee
- Officiating career: 1995–present

William Gene "Bill" or "Billy" Kennedy (born November 10, 1966) is an American professional basketball referee for the National Basketball Association (NBA). In 2015, he became the league's second openly gay official.

== Early life ==
As a pre-teen in Phoenix, Arizona, Kennedy knew that he wanted to become a referee. In particular, he idolized Tommy Nuñez, Sr., who is the first Latino to referee in any major sport.

Kennedy graduated from St. Mary's High School in Phoenix, Arizona and, as a youth, was a regular at the local Boys & Girls Club where he was mentored by Nuñez. At age 12, he refereed his first game for 8- and 9-year olds. While attending Arizona State University, he officiated local high school basketball and football games on the weekends, and by age 20, he began refereeing at two year colleges.

== Referee career ==
From 1987 to 2012, Kennedy officiated college basketball for several major conferences, including Big 12, Big Sky, Big West, Conference USA, Mountain West, Pac 12, Southland, Sun Belt and WAC.

During the 1995–96 season, Kennedy refereed in the Continental Basketball Association (CBA), including the CBA Finals. He began as an NBA referee during the lockout 1995–96 NBA season before securing a permanent role in 1999. He has officiated over five NBA Finals series, as well as the 2010 FIBA World Championships and the 2012 Summer Olympics.

The NBA introduced the coach's challenge rule during the 2019–20 season, which grants each team one opportunity per game to dispute a referees' initial call. Kennedy has become known for his entertaining announcements of the rulings, using dramatic pauses and careful enunciation.

Kennedy was named the regional advisor [West] during the 2021–22 NCAA Division I Men's Basketball Championships, replacing his mentor, Tommy Nuñez, Sr. This group of advisors observes over 60 games in person and over 40 games remotely, while also charting all correct calls for every official that they observe.

During the 2025–26 NBA season, Kennedy was forced to leave a January match-up between the Philadelphia 76ers and Orlando Magic with a right leg injury. Kennedy would leave the Kia Center in a wheelchair, with referees James Williams and Michael Smith officiating the remainder of the game.

=== Coming out ===
In 1999, after a Detroit Pistons game, Kennedy shook a boy's hand while on his way to the officials' locker room. He inadvertently bumped a female usher who claimed the next day that Kennedy touched her inappropriately. NBA executive vice president of operations Rod Thorn immediately suspended Kennedy, which prompted Kennedy to reveal to Thorn that he is gay, and he returned to work.

Kennedy ejected Boston Celtics' coach Doc Rivers from a game on March 17, 2009. Rivers was fined $25,000 for remarks he made about Kennedy after the game, and Kennedy was fined an undisclosed amount for his handling of the situation. Rivers reportedly used a gay slur towards Kennedy during the 2009 NBA Playoffs. In 2010, former NBA referee Tim Donaghy outed Kennedy on a Boston radio show, while referring to Kennedy as a "homosexual"; however the story did not gain any traction.

In December 2015, Kennedy ejected Rajon Rondo from a game, and Rondo used a gay slur towards Kennedy. After mulling over the consequences of coming out, Kennedy publicly revealed that he is gay, which shifted the conversation from verbal abuse to potential hate speech. Rondo was given a one game suspension.

== Personal life ==
Kennedy primarily was raised by his mother, with whom he shared a two-bedroom apartment until he was 30 years old.

In 2015, Kennedy announced that he is a gay man, noting "I am proud to be an NBA referee, and I am proud to be a gay man. I am following in the footsteps of others who have self-identified in the hopes that will send a message to young men and women in sports that you must allow no one to make you feel ashamed of who you are."

He is a known karaoke enthusiast.
