= Curtis Blair =

American basketball referee

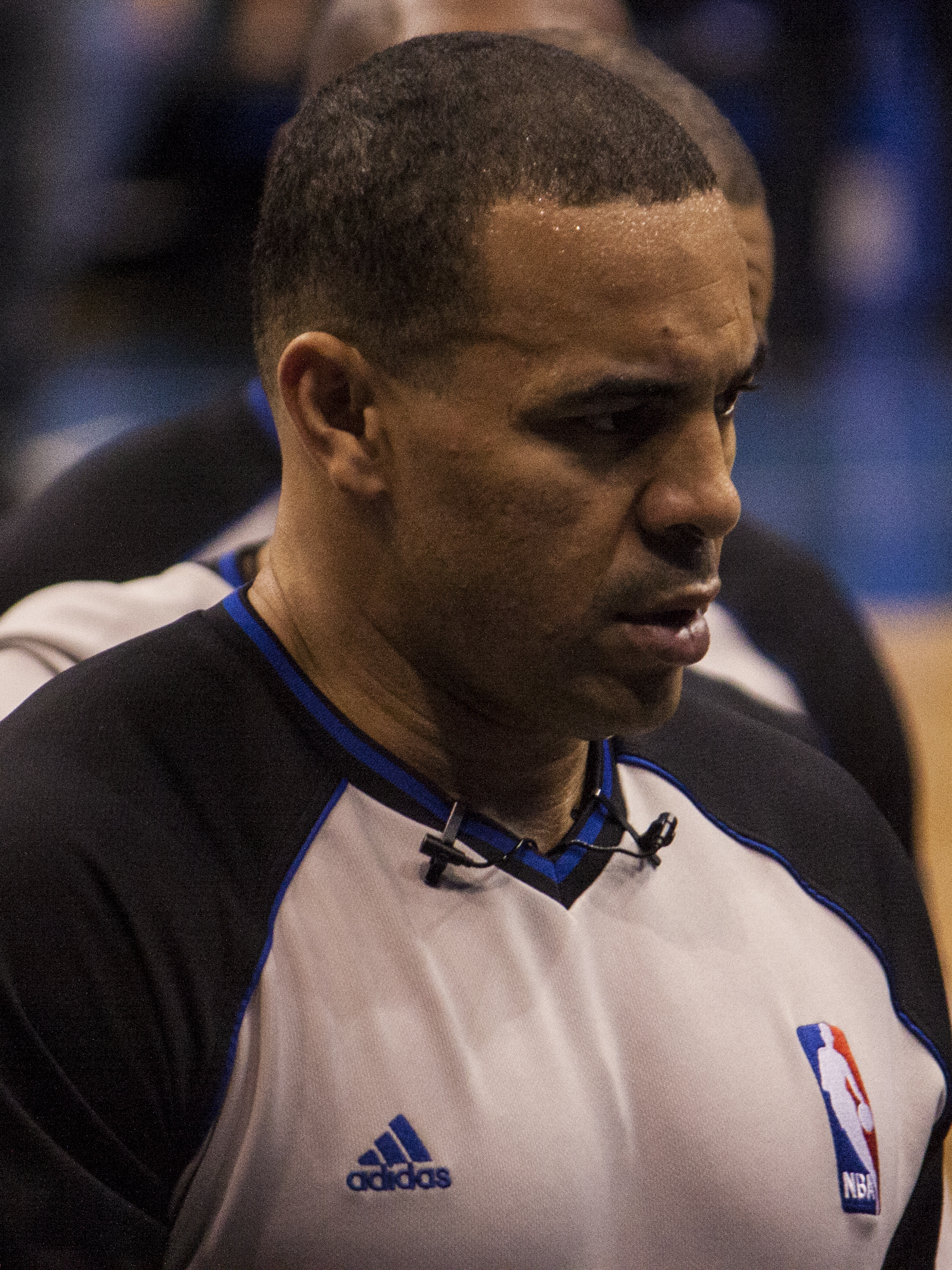
- Blair in 2012

Personal information
- Born: September 24, 1970 (age 56) Roanoke, Virginia, U.S.
- Listed height: 6 ft 3 in (1.91 m)
- Listed weight: 185 lb (84 kg)

Career information
- High school: Patrick Henry (Roanoke, Virginia)
- College: Richmond (1988–1992)
- NBA draft: 1992: 2nd round, 53rd overall pick
- Drafted by: Houston Rockets
- Position: Point guard
- Officiating career: 2008–present

Career highlights
- CAA Player of the Year (1992); 2× CAA All-Defensive Team (1991, 1992); 2× First-team All-CAA (1991, 1992)
- Stats at Basketball Reference

Curtis Blair (born September 24, 1970) is an American basketball referee who currently officiates in the National Basketball Association (NBA).

== Playing career ==
A 6'3" and 185 lb point guard, Blair played college basketball for the University of Richmond Spiders. He was honored as the Colonial Athletic Association Men's Basketball Player of the Year in 1991–92 season, as well as a two-time first-team All-CAA and three-time CAA All-Tournament team selection.

He was selected by the Houston Rockets in the 2nd round (53rd overall) of the 1992 NBA draft, though he never played in a regular-season game for the Rockets.

== Career as referee ==
Following a brief career playing overseas including Turkey, Blair became a referee in the NBA, where he wears the number 74.

Blair began officiating in the NBA in the 2008-09 NBA season. As of June 2026, he has officiated 1,012 regular season games and 57 playoff games.

On June 2, 2026, it was announced that Blair would be working the NBA Finals for the first time in his career. He will be a referee in the 2026 NBA Finals, the only first-time selection in the group of 12 referees for the series.
