= 2023 NBA In-Season Tournament =

Basketball tournament

- Official promotional poster for the championship game

Tournament information
- Location: Local NBA cities (group stage and quarterfinals); Las Vegas Strip (semifinals and championship game)
- Date: November 3 – December 9, 2023
- Venues: Local NBA arenas (group stage and quarterfinals); T-Mobile Arena (semifinals and championship game)
- Teams: 30
- Purse: See prize money

Final positions
- Champions: Los Angeles Lakers (1st title)
- Runner-up: Indiana Pacers
- MVP: LeBron James (Los Angeles Lakers)

The 2023 NBA In-Season Tournament was a multi-stage basketball tournament that played during the 2023–24 NBA season. It was the first edition of the NBA Cup, then under the working name NBA In-Season Tournament. All 30 teams participated, each playing four regular season games that count towards the tournament's group stage standings. All games in the knockout round, except for the championship game, also counted towards the regular season standings. The tournament's semifinals and championship game were played at T-Mobile Arena on the Las Vegas Strip.

The Los Angeles Lakers defeated the Indiana Pacers in the championship game, and Los Angeles' LeBron James was named the Most Valuable Player for the tournament.

== Format ==
The tournament's format was similar to in-season, multi-stage tournaments in European soccer.

In the group stage, each conference was divided into three groups with five teams each, for a total of six groups. Regular season games played on Tuesdays and Fridays between November 3 and November 28 counted in the regular season standings and the In-Season Tournament standings. Each team played one game against each of the other teams in its group, for a total of four games (two at home and two on the road).

If two or more teams in a group had equal records upon completion of group play, the following tiebreakers were applied in this order:

1. Head-to-head record in the group stage
2. Point differential in the group stage
3. Total points scored in the group stage
4. Regular season record from the 2022–23 regular season
5. Random drawing

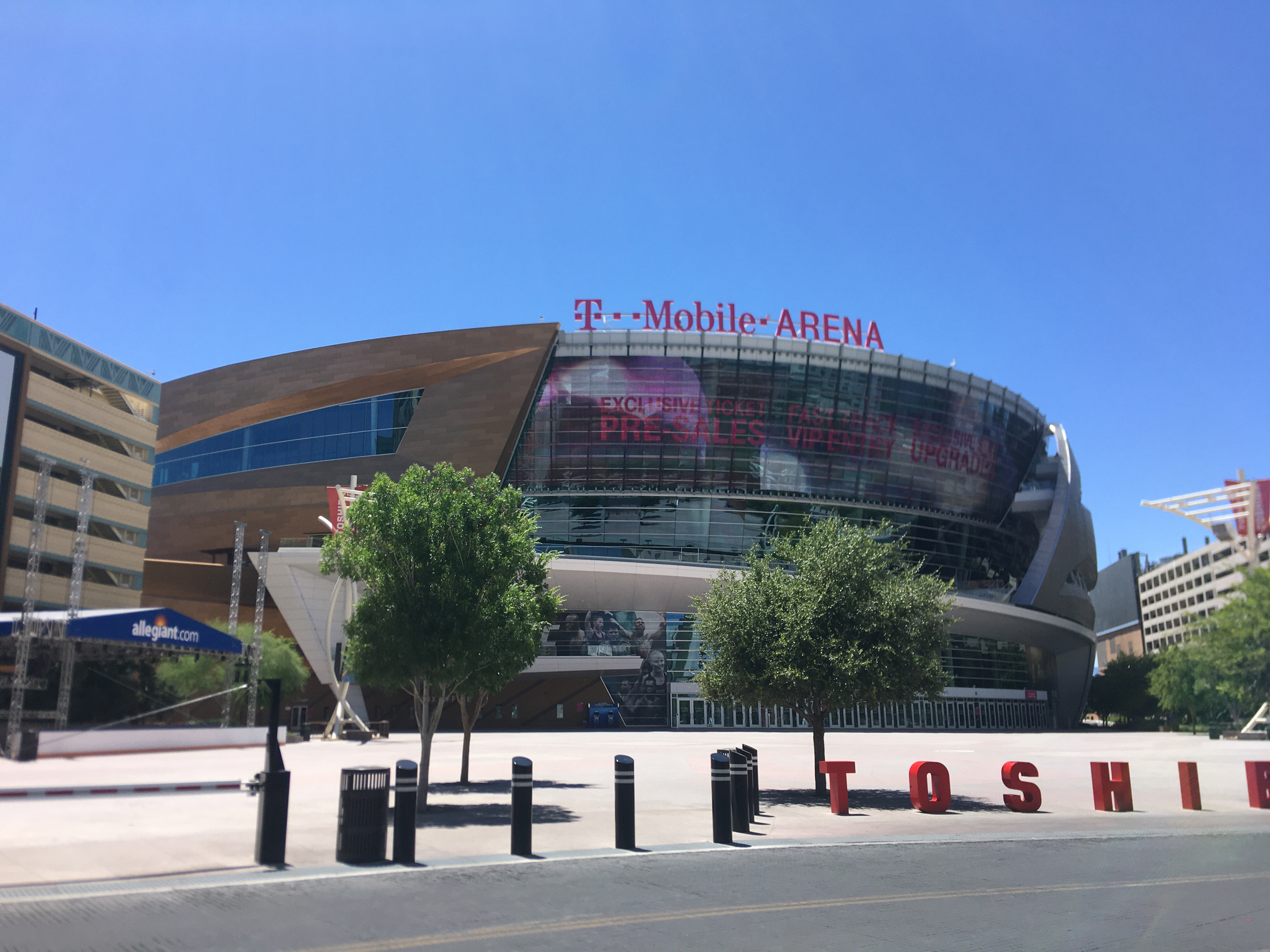
T-Mobile Arena in 2020

Each group's winner then advanced to the knockout stage, as did one wild card from each conference—the group runner-up with the best group stage record. The knockout stage was a single-elimination tournament. Quarterfinal games were played in local NBA markets on December 4 and 5, with the teams with the top two group stage records in each conference hosting, and the best team in group-play games would host the wild-card team. The semifinals were played on December 7, and the championship was on December 9. The final two rounds were played at T-Mobile Arena on the Las Vegas Strip.

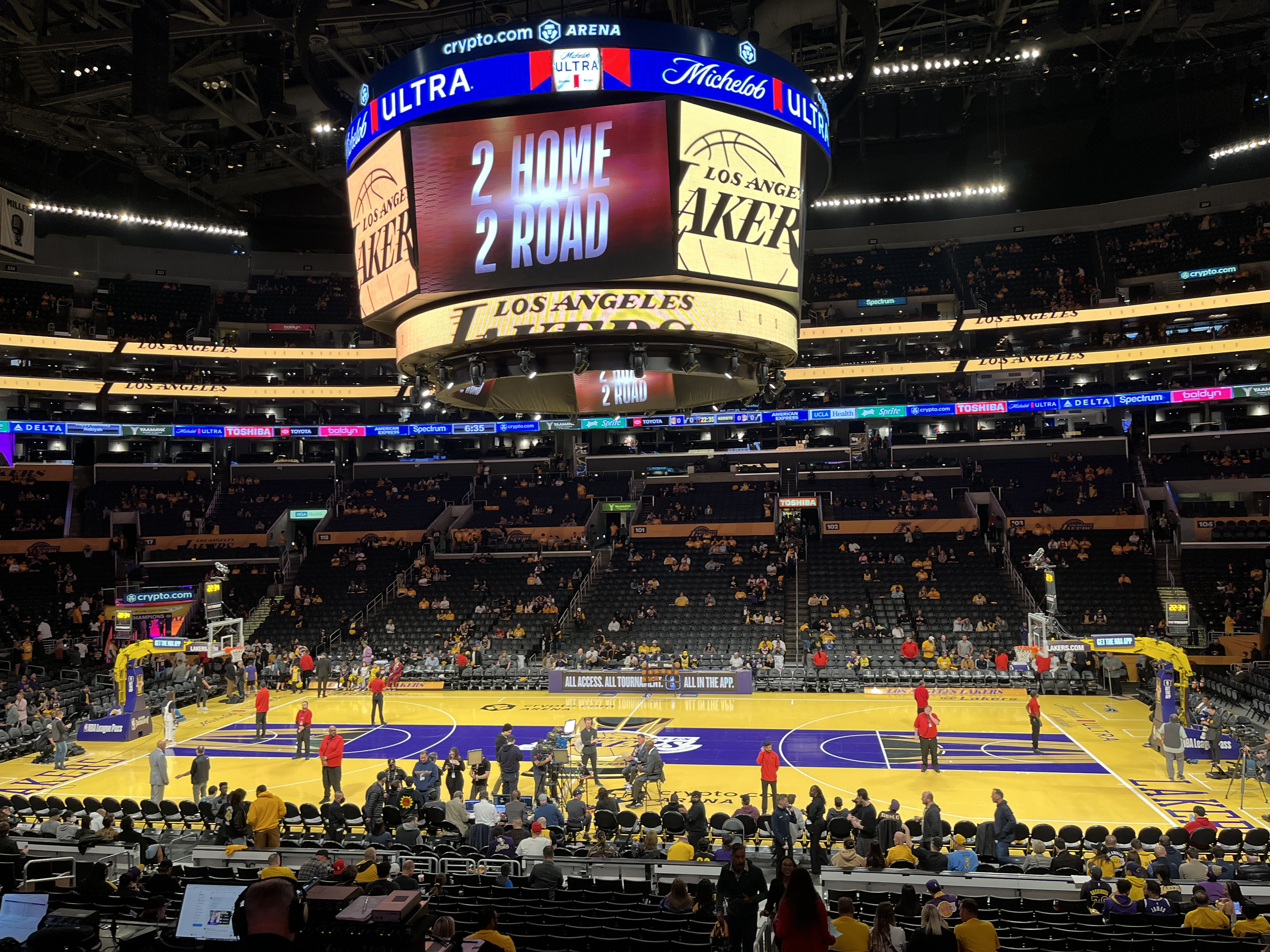
In-Season Tournament court of the Los Angeles Lakers

Quarterfinal and semifinal games counted as regular season games, affecting teams' positions in league standings, but the championship game did not. Statistics from the championship game are also not counted in regular season totals.

To balance the regular season, the four teams that lost in the quarterfinals played one additional game on December 8, against each other in the same conference.

While the knockout stage was played, the 22 teams that did not qualify for the knockout stage each played two additional regular season games, one home and one away, to complete each team's 82 game regular season schedule. Among these 22 total matchups, 20 were intra-conference games, with an attempt by the league to schedule as many pairs of teams which were originally scheduled to only play each other three times during the regular season. The other two matchups were interconference games, as there was an odd number of teams in each conference (11). These two interconference matchups featured four of the six teams that finished last in their respective group.

=== Prize money ===
Players on teams advancing to the knockout stage will receive prize money as follows:

- Players on teams that lose in the quarterfinals: $50,000 each
- Players on teams that lose in the semifinals: $100,000 each
- Players on the tournament runner-up team: $200,000 each
- Players on the tournament championship team: $500,000 each

== Draw ==
=== Pots ===
Teams were allocated into five pots per conference based on the 2022–23 regular season standings. Pot 1 contained the teams with the top three regular season records in each conference, while Pot 2 contained the teams with the fourth- to sixth-best records and so forth, concluding with Pot 5, which contained the teams with the bottom three (thirteenth through fifteenth) records.

Eastern Conference in the 2023 NBA In-Season Tournament
Pot	#	Team	Record	
Pot	#	Team	W	L
1	1	Milwaukee Bucks	58	24
1	2	Boston Celtics	57	25
1	3	Philadelphia 76ers	54	28
2	4	Cleveland Cavaliers	51	31
2	5	New York Knicks	47	35
2	6	Brooklyn Nets	45	37
3	7	Miami Heat	44	38
3	8	Atlanta Hawks	41	41
3	9	Toronto Raptors	41	41
4	10	Chicago Bulls	40	42
4	11	Indiana Pacers	35	47
4	12	Washington Wizards	35	47
5	13	Orlando Magic	34	48
5	14	Charlotte Hornets	27	55
5	15	Detroit Pistons	17	65

Western Conference in the 2023 NBA In-Season Tournament
Pot	#	Team	Record	
Pot	#	Team	W	L
1	1	Denver Nuggets	53	29
1	2	Memphis Grizzlies	51	31
1	3	Sacramento Kings	48	34
2	4	Phoenix Suns	45	37
2	5	Los Angeles Clippers	44	38
2	6	Golden State Warriors	44	38
3	7	Los Angeles Lakers	43	39
3	8	Minnesota Timberwolves	42	40
3	9	New Orleans Pelicans	42	40
4	10	Oklahoma City Thunder	40	42
4	11	Dallas Mavericks	38	44
4	12	Utah Jazz	37	45
5	13	Portland Trail Blazers	33	49
5	14	Houston Rockets	22	60
5	15	San Antonio Spurs	22	60

=== Draw results ===
The initial groups were revealed during the tournament announcement on July 8, 2023. The five teams in each group were selected by a draw of one team from each of the five pots for the conference in question.

Eastern Conference
Group A	Group B	Group C
Philadelphia 76ers (3); Cleveland Cavaliers (4); Atlanta Hawks (8); Indiana Pacers (11); Detroit Pistons (15)	Milwaukee Bucks (1); New York Knicks (5); Miami Heat (7); Washington Wizards (12); Charlotte Hornets (14)	Boston Celtics (2); Brooklyn Nets (6); Toronto Raptors (9); Chicago Bulls (10); Orlando Magic (13)

Western Conference
Group A	Group B	Group C
Memphis Grizzlies (2); Phoenix Suns (4); Los Angeles Lakers (7); Utah Jazz (12); Portland Trail Blazers (13)	Denver Nuggets (1); Los Angeles Clippers (5); New Orleans Pelicans (9); Dallas Mavericks (11); Houston Rockets (14)	Sacramento Kings (3); Golden State Warriors (6); Minnesota Timberwolves (8); Oklahoma City Thunder (10); San Antonio Spurs (15)

== Group stage ==
=== East group A ===
Pos	Team	Pld	W	L	PF	PA	PD	Qualification	IND	CLE	PHI	ATL	DET
1	Indiana Pacers	4	4	0	546	507	+39	Advance to knockout stage	—	121–116	132–126	157–152	136–113
2	Cleveland Cavaliers	4	3	1	474	445	+29		116–121	—	122–119 (OT)	128–105	108–100
3	Philadelphia 76ers	4	2	2	485	476	+9		126–132	119–122 (OT)	—	126–116	114–106
4	Atlanta Hawks	4	1	3	499	531	−32		152–157	105–128	116–126	—	126–120
5	Detroit Pistons	4	0	4	439	484	−45		113–136	100–108	106–114	120–126	—

Source: NBA
Rules for classification: Tiebreakers

Games

Note: Times are Eastern Time (UTC−4 or UTC−5) as listed by the NBA. If the venue is located in a different time zone, the local time is also given.

NBA League Pass

November 3
7:00 p.m.

Recap

Cleveland Cavaliers 116, Indiana Pacers 121
Scoring by quarter: 26–36, 27–34, 34–18, 29–33
Pts: Donovan Mitchell 38; Rebs: Evan Mobley 10; Asts: Donovan Mitchell 9	Pts: Myles Turner 27; Rebs: Myles Turner 9 Asts: Tyrese Haliburton 13

Gainbridge Fieldhouse, Indianapolis, IN
Attendance: 16,744
Referees:
- No. 45 Brian Forte
- No. 36 Brent Barnaky
- No. 82 Suyash Mehta

NBA League Pass

November 10
7:00 p.m.

Recap

Philadelphia 76ers 114, Detroit Pistons 106
Scoring by quarter: 21–33, 27–23, 35–21, 31–29
Pts: Joel Embiid 33; Rebs: Joel Embiid 16; Asts: Tyrese Maxey 10	Pts: Killian Hayes 23; Rebs: Ausar Thompson 12; Asts: Cade Cunningham 7

Little Caesars Arena, Detroit, MI
Attendance: 18,902
Referees:
- No. 25 Tony Brothers
- No. 64 Justin Van Duyne
- No. 32 Marat Kogut

NBA League Pass

November 14
7:00 p.m.

Recap

Atlanta Hawks 126, Detroit Pistons 120
Scoring by quarter: 38–29, 26–31, 33–31, 29–29
Pts: Dejounte Murray 32; Rebs: Onyeka Okongwu 9 Asts: Dejounte Murray 9	Pts: Marvin Bagley III 22; Rebs: Marvin Bagley III 10; Asts: Cade Cunningham 12

Little Caesars Arena, Detroit, MI
Attendance: 16,963
Referees:
- No. 77 Karl Lane
- No. 3 Nick Buchert
- No. 85 Robert Hussey

NBA League Pass

November 14
7:00 p.m.

Recap

Indiana Pacers 132, Philadelphia 76ers 126
Scoring by quarter: 36–30, 27–24, 32–40, 37–32
Pts: Tyrese Haliburton 33; Rebs: Isaiah Jackson 9 Asts: Tyrese Haliburton 15	Pts: Joel Embiid 39; Rebs: Joel Embiid 12; Asts: Joel Embiid 6

Wells Fargo Center, Philadelphia, PA
Attendance: 19,774
Referees:
- No. 61 Courtney Kirkland
- No. 35 Jason Goldenberg
- No. 31 Scott Wall

NBA League Pass

November 17
7:30 p.m.

Recap

Philadelphia 76ers 126, Atlanta Hawks 116
Scoring by quarter: 30–24, 27–32, 37–31, 32–29
Pts: Joel Embiid 32; Rebs: Tobias Harris 10; Asts: Embiid, Maxey 8 each	Pts: Trae Young 22; Rebs: Clint Capela 11; Asts: Trae Young 13

State Farm Arena, Atlanta, GA
Attendance: 17,067
Referees:
- No. 46 Ben Taylor
- No. 51 Aaron Smith
- No. 83 Andy Nagy

NBA League Pass

November 17
7:30 p.m.

Recap

Detroit Pistons 100, Cleveland Cavaliers 108
Scoring by quarter: 26–35, 19–24, 28–21, 27–28
Pts: Cade Cunningham 20; Rebs: Kevin Knox II 11; Asts: Cade Cunningham 8	Pts: Darius Garland 28; Rebs: Evan Mobley 10; Asts: Mobley, Porter 5 each

Rocket Mortgage FieldHouse, Cleveland, OH
Attendance: 19,432
Referees:
- No. 14 Ed Malloy
- No. 33 Sean Corbin
- No. 20 Jenna Schroeder

NBA League Pass

November 21
7:30 p.m.

Recap

Indiana Pacers 157, Atlanta Hawks 152
Scoring by quarter: 34–40, 39–46, 46–28, 38–38
Pts: Tyrese Haliburton 37; Rebs: Myles Turner 9 Asts: Tyrese Haliburton 16	Pts: Trae Young 38; Rebs: Saddiq Bey 10; Asts: Trae Young 8

State Farm Arena, Atlanta, GA
Attendance: 17,162
Referees:
- No. 68 Jacyn Goble
- No. 37 Eric Dalen
- No. 7 Lauren Holtkamp

TNT

November 21
7:30 p.m.

Recap

Cleveland Cavaliers 122, Philadelphia 76ers 119 (OT)
Scoring by quarter: 27–24, 38–29, 23–26, 22–31, Overtime: 12–9
Pts: Darius Garland 32; Rebs: Jarrett Allen 13; Asts: Craig Porter Jr. 9	Pts: Joel Embiid 32; Rebs: Joel Embiid 13; Asts: Tyrese Maxey 6

Wells Fargo Center, Philadelphia, PA
Attendance: 20,565
Referees:
- No. 29 Mark Lindsay
- No. 9 Natalie Sago
- No. 43 Matt Myers

NBA League Pass

November 24
8:00 p.m.

Recap

Detroit Pistons 113, Indiana Pacers 136
Scoring by quarter: 26–33, 37–28, 33–36, 17–39
Pts: Cade Cunningham 31; Rebs: Jalen Duren 13; Asts: Cade Cunningham 5	Pts: Tyrese Haliburton 26; Rebs: Myles Turner 10; Asts: Tyrese Haliburton 10

Gainbridge Fieldhouse, Indianapolis, IN
Attendance: 17,274
Referees:
- No. 39 Tyler Ford
- No. 44 Brett Nansel
- No. 70 Phenizee Ransom

NBA League Pass

November 28
7:30 p.m.

Recap

Atlanta Hawks 105, Cleveland Cavaliers 128
Scoring by quarter: 33–29, 28–35, 29–38, 15–26
Pts: Bogdanović, Hunter 18 each Rebs: Capela, Okongwu 9 each Asts: Trae Young 10	Pts: Donovan Mitchell 40; Rebs: Evan Mobley 19; Asts: Darius Garland 8

Rocket Mortgage FieldHouse, Cleveland, OH
Attendance: 19,432
Referees:
- No. 15 Zach Zarba
- No. 83 Andy Nagy
- No. 70 Phenizee Ransom

=== East group B ===
Pos	Team	Pld	W	L	PF	PA	PD	Qualification	MIL	NYK	MIA	CHA	WAS
1	Milwaukee Bucks	4	4	0	502	456	+46	Advance to knockout stage	—	110–105	131–124	130–99	131–128
2	New York Knicks	4	3	1	440	398	+42	Advance to knockout stage	105–110	—	100–98	115–91	120–99
3	Miami Heat	4	2	2	454	450	+4		124–131	98–100	—	111–105	121–114
4	Charlotte Hornets	4	1	3	419	473	−54		99–130	91–115	105–111	—	124–117
5	Washington Wizards	4	0	4	458	496	−38		128–131	99–120	114–121	117–124	—

Source: NBA
Rules for classification: Tiebreakers

Games

Note: Times are Eastern Time (UTC−4 or UTC−5) as listed by the NBA. If the venue is located in a different time zone, the local time is also given.

ESPN

November 3
7:30 p.m. (6:30 p.m. Central)

Recap

New York Knicks 105, Milwaukee Bucks 110
Scoring by quarter: 25–21, 21–35, 30–26, 29–28
Pts: Jalen Brunson 45; Rebs: Mitchell Robinson 15; Asts: Hart, Randle 5 each	Pts: Damian Lillard 30; Rebs: Khris Middleton 9 Asts: Giannis Antetokounmpo 6

Fiserv Forum, Milwaukee, WI
Attendance: 17,717
Referees:
- No. 60 James Williams
- No. 39 Tyler Ford
- No. 63 Derek Richardson

NBA League Pass

November 3
8:00 p.m.

Recap

Washington Wizards 114, Miami Heat 121
Scoring by quarter: 34–34, 20–26, 27–41, 33–20
Pts: Kyle Kuzma 22; Rebs: Daniel Gafford 5 Asts: Jordan Poole 6	Pts: Tyler Herro 24; Rebs: Tyler Herro 11; Asts: Tyler Herro 9

Kaseya Center, Miami, FL
Attendance: 19,660
Referees:
- No. 15 Zach Zarba
- No. 33 Sean Corbin
- No. 56 John Conley

NBA League Pass

November 10
7:00 p.m.

Recap

Charlotte Hornets 124, Washington Wizards 117
Scoring by quarter: 22–27, 35–36, 31–34, 36–20
Pts: Gordon Hayward 27; Rebs: Mark Williams 24; Asts: Gordon Hayward 9	Pts: Kyle Kuzma 17; Rebs: Daniel Gafford 8 Asts: Jordan Poole 6

Capital One Arena, Washington, D.C.
Attendance: 17,602
Referees:
- No. 74 Curtis Blair
- No. 70 Phenizee Ransom
- No. 40 Leon Wood

NBA League Pass

November 14
7:00 p.m.

Recap

Miami Heat 111, Charlotte Hornets 105
Scoring by quarter: 24–32, 33–16, 30–32, 24–25
Pts: Jimmy Butler 32; Rebs: Bam Adebayo 11; Asts: Josh Richardson 6	Pts: P. J. Washington 32; Rebs: Nick Richards 11; Asts: LaMelo Ball 11

Spectrum Center, Charlotte, NC
Attendance: 15,673
Referees:
- No. 15 Zach Zarba
- No. 21 Dedric Taylor
- No. 53 Matt Kallio

NBA League Pass

November 17
7:00 p.m.

Recap

Milwaukee Bucks 130, Charlotte Hornets 99
Scoring by quarter: 28–37, 31–20, 33–24, 38–18
Pts: Damian Lillard 27; Rebs: Giannis Antetokounmpo 8 Asts: Giannis Antetokounmpo 9	Pts: LaMelo Ball 37; Rebs: Mark Williams 16; Asts: LaMelo Ball 5

Spectrum Center, Charlotte, NC
Attendance: 19,258
Referees:
- No. 45 Brian Forte
- No. 68 Jacyn Goble
- No. 31 Scott Wall

NBA League Pass

November 17
7:00 p.m.

Recap

New York Knicks 120, Washington Wizards 99
Scoring by quarter: 35–25, 30–29, 24–30, 31–15
Pts: Jalen Brunson 32; Rebs: Hartenstein, Robinson 8 each Asts: Julius Randle 8	Pts: Kyle Kuzma 19; Rebs: Daniel Gafford 7 Asts: Jones, Kuzma 5 each

Capital One Arena, Washington, D.C.
Attendance: 16,886
Referees:
- No. 24 Kevin Scott
- No. 3 Nick Buchert
- No. 56 John Conley

ESPN

November 24
7:30 p.m.

Recap

Miami Heat 98, New York Knicks 100
Scoring by quarter: 28–25, 22–26, 37–20, 11–29
Pts: Jimmy Butler 23; Rebs: Bam Adebayo 12; Asts: Jaime Jaquez Jr. 4	Pts: Jalen Brunson 24; Rebs: Hart, Randle 8 each Asts: Julius Randle 7

Madison Square Garden, New York City, NY
Attendance: 19,812
Referees:
- No. 58 Josh Tiven
- No. 36 Brent Barnaky
- No. 49 Tom Washington

NBA League Pass

November 24
8:00 p.m. (7:00 p.m. Central)

Recap

Washington Wizards 128, Milwaukee Bucks 131
Scoring by quarter: 35–34, 26–26, 28–32, 39–39
Pts: Jordan Poole 26; Rebs: Daniel Gafford 9 Asts: Jones, Poole 7 each	Pts: Brook Lopez 39; Rebs: Malik Beasley 11; Asts: Damian Lillard 10

Fiserv Forum, Milwaukee, WI
Attendance: 17,880
Referees:
- No. 4 Sean Wright
- No. 37 Eric Dalen
- No. 67 Brandon Adair

TNT

November 28
7:30 p.m.

Recap

Milwaukee Bucks 131, Miami Heat 124
Scoring by quarter: 31–22, 28–40, 34–35, 38–27
Pts: Giannis Antetokounmpo 33; Rebs: G. Antetokounmpo, Beasley 10 each Asts: Damian Lillard 9	Pts: Bam Adebayo 31; Rebs: Adebayo, Love 10 each Asts: Josh Richardson 7

Kaseya Center, Miami, FL
Attendance: 19,691
Referees:
- No. 16 David Guthrie
- No. 68 Jacyn Goble
- No. 32 Marat Kogut

NBA League Pass

November 28
7:30 p.m.

Recap

Charlotte Hornets 91, New York Knicks 115
Scoring by quarter: 16–29, 28–24, 22–27, 25–35
Pts: Brandon Miller 18; Rebs: Mark Williams 12; Asts: Gordon Hayward 6	Pts: Julius Randle 25; Rebs: Julius Randle 20; Asts: Jalen Brunson 7

Madison Square Garden, New York City, NY
Attendance: 19,111
Referees:
- No. 61 Courtney Kirkland
- No. 44 Brett Nansel
- No. 43 Matt Myers

=== East group C ===
Pos	Team	Pld	W	L	PF	PA	PD	Qualification	BOS	ORL	BKN	TOR	CHI
1	Boston Celtics	4	3 (Note: Tied on head-to-head results. Overall point difference is used as the tiebreaker.)	1	449	422	+27	Advance to knockout stage	—	96–113	121–107	108–105	124–97
2	Orlando Magic	4	3	1	446	424	+22		113–96	—	104–124	126–107	103–97
3	Brooklyn Nets	4	3	1	455	435	+20		107–121	124–104	—	115–103	109–107
4	Toronto Raptors	4	1	3	436	457	−21		105–108	107–126	103–115	—	121–108
5	Chicago Bulls	4	0	4	409	457	−48		97–124	97–103	107–109	108–121	—

Source: NBA
Rules for classification: Tiebreakers
Notes:

Games

Note: Times are Eastern Time (UTC−4 or UTC−5) as listed by the NBA. If the venue is located in a different time zone, the local time is also given.

NBA League Pass

November 3
8:00 p.m. (7:00 p.m. Central)

Recap

Brooklyn Nets 109, Chicago Bulls 107
Scoring by quarter: 35–30, 24–28, 19–22, 31–27
Pts: Dorian Finney-Smith 21; Rebs: Day'Ron Sharpe 10; Asts: Spencer Dinwiddie 9	Pts: DeRozan, LaVine 24 each Rebs: Nikola Vučević 13; Asts: Zach LaVine 5

United Center, Chicago, IL
Attendance: 20,645
Referees:
- No. 58 Josh Tiven
- No. 54 Ray Acosta
- No. 72 J. T. Orr

ESPN

November 10
7:30 p.m.

Recap

Brooklyn Nets 107, Boston Celtics 121
Scoring by quarter: 33–38, 21–28, 30–27, 23–28
Pts: Lonnie Walker IV 20; Rebs: Walker, Watford 7 each Asts: Dennis Smith Jr. 7	Pts: Jaylen Brown 28; Rebs: Jrue Holiday 12; Asts: Jrue Holiday 9

TD Garden, Boston, MA
Attendance: 19,156
Referees:
- No. 15 Zach Zarba
- No. 33 Sean Corbin
- No. 35 Jason Goldenberg

NBA League Pass

November 14
7:30 p.m.

Recap

Orlando Magic 104, Brooklyn Nets 124
Scoring by quarter: 24–33, 36–24, 26–31, 18–36
Pts: Franz Wagner 21; Rebs: Franz Wagner 8 Asts: Franz Wagner 5	Pts: Spencer Dinwiddie 29; Rebs: Day'Ron Sharpe 10; Asts: Spencer Dinwiddie 9

Barclays Center, Brooklyn, NY
Attendance: 17,361
Referees:
- No. 25 Tony Brothers
- No. 32 Marat Kogut
- No. 78 Evan Scott

NBA League Pass

November 17
7:30 p.m.

Recap

Boston Celtics 108, Toronto Raptors 105
Scoring by quarter: 26–32, 39–17, 19–32, 24–24
Pts: Jaylen Brown 23; Rebs: Kristaps Porziņģis 12; Asts: Holiday, Porziņģis, White 5 each	Pts: Schröder, Siakam 23 each Rebs: Precious Achiuwa 9 Asts: Barnes, Schröder 6 each

Scotiabank Arena, Toronto, ON
Attendance: 19,800
Referees:
- No. 25 Tony Brothers
- No. 7 Lauren Holtkamp
- No. 41 Nate Green

NBA League Pass

November 17
8:00 p.m. (7:00 p.m. Central)

Recap

Orlando Magic 103, Chicago Bulls 97
Scoring by quarter: 23–16, 25–17, 29–32, 26–32
Pts: Franz Wagner 21; Rebs: Jonathan Isaac 9 Asts: Cole Anthony 7	Pts: Zach LaVine 34; Rebs: Nikola Vučević 10; Asts: Nikola Vučević 6

United Center, Chicago, IL
Attendance: 20,235
Referees:
- No. 39 Tyler Ford
- No. 77 Karl Lane
- No. 87 Danielle Scott

NBA League Pass

November 21
7:00 p.m.

Recap

Toronto Raptors 107, Orlando Magic 126
Scoring by quarter: 23–30, 33–37, 26–33, 25–26
Pts: Dennis Schröder 24; Rebs: Jakob Pöltl 10; Asts: Pascal Siakam 8	Pts: Paolo Banchero 25; Rebs: Goga Bitadze 7 Asts: Cole Anthony 10

Amway Center, Orlando, FL
Attendance: 18,846
Referees:
- No. 60 James Williams
- No. 72 J. T. Orr
- No. 28 Mousa Dagher

NBA TV

November 24
2:30 p.m.

Recap

Boston Celtics 96, Orlando Magic 113
Scoring by quarter: 30–19, 26–29, 18–29, 22–36
Pts: Jayson Tatum 26; Rebs: Luke Kornet 6 Asts: Derrick White 4	Pts: Moritz Wagner 27; Rebs: Paolo Banchero 8 Asts: Anthony, F. Wagner 6 each

Amway Center, Orlando, FL
Attendance: 18,846
Referees:
- No. 16 David Guthrie
- No. 22 JB DeRosa
- No. 35 Jason Goldenberg

NBA League Pass

November 24
7:30 p.m.

Recap

Chicago Bulls 108, Toronto Raptors 121
Scoring by quarter: 22–36, 26–26, 29–31, 31–28
Pts: Zach LaVine 36; Rebs: Nikola Vučević 8 Asts: Nikola Vučević 5	Pts: O.G. Anunoby 26; Rebs: Barnes, Pöltl 10 each Asts: Pascal Siakam 8

Scotiabank Arena, Toronto, ON
Attendance: 19,800
Referees:
- No. 24 Kevin Scott
- No. 9 Natalie Sago
- No. 78 Evan Scott

NBA League Pass

November 28
7:30 p.m.

Recap

Chicago Bulls 97, Boston Celtics 124
Scoring by quarter: 20–31, 30–38, 18–28, 29–27
Pts: DeRozan, White 19 each Rebs: Nikola Vučević 8 Asts: Demar DeRozan 6	Pts: Jaylen Brown 30; Rebs: Sam Hauser 10; Asts: Jrue Holiday 9

TD Garden, Boston, MA
Attendance: 19,156
Referees:
- No. 58 Josh Tiven
- No. 64 Justin Van Duyne
- No. 38 Michael Smith

NBA League Pass

November 28
7:30 p.m.

Recap

Toronto Raptors 103, Brooklyn Nets 115
Scoring by quarter: 21–22, 23–30, 31–24, 28–39
Pts: Barnes, Siakam 17 each Rebs: Scottie Barnes 11; Asts: Dennis Schröder 9	Pts: Spencer Dinwiddie 23; Rebs: Mikal Bridges 10; Asts: Spencer Dinwiddie 8

Barclays Center, Brooklyn, NY
Attendance: 15,844
Referees:
- No. 14 Ed Malloy
- No. 13 Ashley Moyer-Gleich
- No. 18 Matt Boland

=== West group A ===
Pos	Team	Pld	W	L	PF	PA	PD	Qualification	LAL	PHX	UTA	POR	MEM
1	Los Angeles Lakers	4	4	0	494	420	+74	Advance to knockout stage	—	122–119	131–99	107–95	134–107
2	Phoenix Suns	4	3	1	480	446	+34	Advance to knockout stage	119–122	—	131–128	120–107	110–89
3	Utah Jazz	4	2	2	469	482	−13		99–131	128–131	—	115–99	127–121
4	Portland Trail Blazers	4	1	3	416	455	−39		95–107	107–120	99–115	—	115–113 (OT)
5	Memphis Grizzlies	4	0	4	430	486	−56		107–134	89–110	121–127	113–115 (OT)	—

Source: NBA
Rules for classification: Tiebreakers

Games

Note: Times are Eastern Time (UTC−4 or UTC−5) as listed by the NBA. If the venue is located in a different time zone, the local time is also given.

NBA League Pass

November 3
10:00 p.m. (7:00 p.m. Pacific)

Recap

Memphis Grizzlies 113, Portland Trail Blazers 115 (OT)
Scoring by quarter: 26–33, 27–21, 24–22, 25–26, Overtime: 11–13
Pts: Desmond Bane 33; Rebs: Jaren Jackson Jr. 10; Asts: Desmond Bane 7	Pts: Jerami Grant 26; Rebs: Deandre Ayton 12; Asts: Malcolm Brogdon 10

Moda Center, Portland, OR
Attendance: 18,592
Referees:
- No. 19 James Capers
- No. 44 Brett Nansel
- No. 83 Andy Nagy

NBA League Pass

November 10
8:00 p.m. (7:00 p.m. Central)

Recap

Utah Jazz 127, Memphis Grizzlies 121
Scoring by quarter: 34–32, 42–31, 27–32, 24–26
Pts: Clarkson, Markkanen 26 each Rebs: Kelly Olynyk 8 Asts: Keyonte George 11	Pts: Desmond Bane 37; Rebs: Bismack Biyombo 14; Asts: Bane, Gilyard 8

FedExForum, Memphis, TN
Attendance: 16,977
Referees:
- No. 77 Karl Lane
- No. 30 John Butler
- No. 11 Derrick Collins

ESPN

November 10
10:00 p.m. (8:00 p.m. Mountain)

Recap

Los Angeles Lakers 122, Phoenix Suns 119
Scoring by quarter: 25–34, 30–29, 34–33, 33–23
Pts: LeBron James 32; Rebs: Davis, James 11 each Asts: D'Angelo Russell 9	Pts: Kevin Durant 38; Rebs: Allen, Durant, Nurkić 9 each Asts: Jusuf Nurkić 7

Footprint Center, Phoenix, AZ
Attendance: 17,071
Referees:
- No. 24 Kevin Scott
- No. 68 Jacyn Goble
- No. 37 Eric Dalen

NBA League Pass

November 14
9:00 p.m. (7:00 p.m. Mountain)

Recap

Portland Trail Blazers 99, Utah Jazz 115
Scoring by quarter: 28–36, 30–31, 28–28, 13–20
Pts: Jerami Grant 26; Rebs: Deandre Ayton 10; Asts: Skylar Mays 10	Pts: Jordan Clarkson 30; Rebs: Kelly Olynyk 12; Asts: George, Sexton 7 each

Delta Center, Salt Lake City, UT
Attendance: 18,206
Referees:
- No. 8 Marc Davis
- No. 36 Brent Barnaky
- No. 56 John Conley

NBA League Pass

November 14
10:30 p.m. (7:30 p.m. Pacific)

Recap

Memphis Grizzlies 107, Los Angeles Lakers 134
Scoring by quarter: 26–37, 25–37, 35–33, 21–27
Pts: Santi Aldama 24; Rebs: Bismack Biyombo 8 Asts: John Konchar 6	Pts: D'Angelo Russell 24; Rebs: Austin Reaves 12; Asts: Austin Reaves 7

Crypto.com Arena, Los Angeles, CA
Attendance: 18,430
Referees:
- No. 46 Ben Taylor
- No. 54 Ray Acosta
- No. 76 Sha'Rae Mitchell

ESPN

November 17
10:00 p.m. (8:00 p.m. Mountain)

Recap

Phoenix Suns 131, Utah Jazz 128
Scoring by quarter: 41–38, 34–37, 27–24, 29–29
Pts: Kevin Durant 38; Rebs: Kevin Durant 9 Asts: Devin Booker 15	Pts: Jordan Clarkson 37; Rebs: John Collins 14; Asts: Kelly Olynyk 7

Delta Center, Salt Lake City, UT
Attendance: 18,206
Referees:
- No. 55 Bill Kennedy
- No. 38 Michael Smith
- No. 70 Phenizee Ransom

NBA League Pass

November 17
10:00 p.m. (7:00 p.m. Pacific)

Recap

Los Angeles Lakers 107, Portland Trail Blazers 95
Scoring by quarter: 30–23, 30–27, 22–25, 25–20
Pts: LeBron James 35; Rebs: Anthony Davis 14; Asts: LeBron James 9	Pts: Jerami Grant 24; Rebs: Deandre Ayton 12; Asts: Skylar Mays 8

Moda Center, Portland, OR
Attendance: 18,570
Referees:
- No. 58 Josh Tiven
- No. 52 Scott Twardoski
- No. 17 Jonathan Sterling

NBA League Pass

November 21
9:00 p.m. (7:00 p.m. Mountain)

Recap

Portland Trail Blazers 107, Phoenix Suns 120
Scoring by quarter: 21–34, 30–22, 31–38, 25–26
Pts: Jerami Grant 26; Rebs: Deandre Ayton 8 Asts: Jerami Grant 6	Pts: Kevin Durant 31; Rebs: Jusuf Nurkić 12; Asts: Kevin Durant 9

Footprint Center, Phoenix, AZ
Attendance: 17,071
Referees:
- No. 4 Sean Wright
- No. 64 Justin Van Duyne
- No. 91 Che Flores

TNT

November 21
10:00 p.m. (7:00 p.m. Pacific)

Recap

Utah Jazz 99, Los Angeles Lakers 131
Scoring by quarter: 17–32, 24–30, 34–40, 24–29
Pts: Ömer Yurtseven 18; Rebs: Lauri Markkanen 8 Asts: Talen Horton-Tucker 7	Pts: Anthony Davis 26; Rebs: Anthony Davis 16; Asts: LeBron James 9

Crypto.com Arena, Los Angeles, CA
Attendance: 18,997
Referees:
- No. 61 Courtney Kirkland
- No. 34 Kevin Cutler
- No. 78 Evan Scott

NBA TV

November 24
5:00 p.m. (4:00 p.m. Central)

Recap

Phoenix Suns 110, Memphis Grizzlies 89
Scoring by quarter: 29–27, 33–22, 19–24, 29–16
Pts: Devin Booker 40; Rebs: Jusuf Nurkić 10; Asts: Jusuf Nurkić 6	Pts: Santi Aldama 21; Rebs: Jaren Jackson Jr. 7 Asts: Desmond Bane 10

FedExForum, Memphis, TN
Attendance: 17,794
Referees:
- No. 46 Ben Taylor
- No. 38 Michael Smith
- No. 96 Intae Hwang

=== West group B ===
Pos	Team	Pld	W	L	PF	PA	PD	Qualification	NOP	HOU	DAL	DEN	LAC
1	New Orleans Pelicans	4	3	1	463	430	+33	Advance to knockout stage	—	101–104	131–110	115–110	116–106
2	Houston Rockets	4	2 (Note: Tied on head-to-head results. Overall point difference is used as the tiebreaker.)	2	424	414	+10		104–101	—	115–121	105–86	100–106
3	Dallas Mavericks	4	2	2	489	497	−8		110–131	121–115	—	114–125	144–126
4	Denver Nuggets	4	2	2	432	442	−10		110–115	86–105	125–114	—	111–108
5	Los Angeles Clippers	4	1	3	446	471	−25		106–116	106–100	126–144	108–111	—

Source: NBA
Rules for classification: Tiebreakers
Notes:

Games

Note: Times are Eastern Time (UTC−4 or UTC−5) as listed by the NBA. If the venue is located in a different time zone, the local time is also given.

ESPN

November 3
10:00 p.m. (8:00 p.m. Mountain)

Recap

Dallas Mavericks 114, Denver Nuggets 125
Scoring by quarter: 24–40, 31–30, 32–32, 27–23
Pts: Luka Dončić 34; Rebs: Luka Dončić 10; Asts: Luka Dončić 8	Pts: Nikola Jokić 33; Rebs: Nikola Jokić 14; Asts: Jamal Murray 13

Ball Arena, Denver, CO
Attendance: 19,729
Referees:
- No. 14 Ed Malloy
- No. 50 Gediminas Petraitis
- No. 31 Scott Wall

NBA League Pass

November 10
8:00 p.m. (7:00 p.m. Central)

Recap

New Orleans Pelicans 101, Houston Rockets 104
Scoring by quarter: 31–26, 17–28, 31–16, 22–34
Pts: Brandon Ingram 31; Rebs: Dyson Daniels 10; Asts: Brandon Ingram 5	Pts: Jalen Green 25; Rebs: Eason, Şengün 8 each Asts: Fred VanVleet 8

Toyota Center, Houston, TX
Attendance: 16,236
Referees:
- No. 39 Tyler Ford
- No. 9 Natalie Sago
- No. 18 Matt Boland

NBA League Pass

November 10
8:30 p.m. (7:30 p.m. Central)

Recap

Los Angeles Clippers 126, Dallas Mavericks 144
Scoring by quarter: 33–30, 18–47, 38–38, 37–29
Pts: Kawhi Leonard 26; Rebs: Moussa Diabaté 10; Asts: Bones Hyland 6	Pts: Luka Dončić 44; Rebs: Derrick Jones Jr. 10; Asts: Dončić, Exum 6 each

American Airlines Center, Dallas, TX
Attendance: 20,377
Referees:
- No. 29 Mark Lindsay
- No. 23 Tre Maddox
- No. 38 Michael Smith

NBA League Pass

November 14
8:00 p.m. (7:00 p.m. Central)

Recap

Dallas Mavericks 110, New Orleans Pelicans 131
Scoring by quarter: 26–33, 28–37, 31–44, 25–17
Pts: Hardaway, Irving 17 each Rebs: Dereck Lively II 9 Asts: Kyrie Irving 6	Pts: Hawkins, Ingram 25 each Rebs: Brandon Ingram 9 Asts: Brandon Ingram 7

Smoothie King Center, New Orleans, LA
Attendance: 16,354
Referees:
- No. 24 Kevin Scott
- No. 7 Lauren Holtkamp
- No. 83 Andy Nagy

TNT

November 14
10:00 p.m. (8:00 p.m. Mountain)

Recap

Los Angeles Clippers 108, Denver Nuggets 111
Scoring by quarter: 26–28, 26–32, 32–24, 24–27
Pts: Paul George 35; Rebs: Ivica Zubac 13; Asts: Terance Mann 5	Pts: Nikola Jokić 32; Rebs: Nikola Jokić 16; Asts: Nikola Jokić 9

Ball Arena, Denver, CO
Attendance: 19,661
Referees:
- No. 58 Josh Tiven
- No. 9 Natalie Sago
- No. 18 Matt Boland

NBA League Pass

November 17
8:00 p.m. (7:00 p.m. Central)

Recap

Denver Nuggets 110, New Orleans Pelicans 115
Scoring by quarter: 28–36, 25–33, 33–26, 24–20
Pts: Nikola Jokić 26; Rebs: Nikola Jokić 16; Asts: Nikola Jokić 18	Pts: Zion Williamson 26; Rebs: Dyson Daniels 9 Asts: Brandon Ingram 8

Smoothie King Center, New Orleans, LA
Attendance: 15,278
Referees:
- No. 8 Marc Davis
- No. 21 Dedric Taylor
- No. 11 Derrick Collins

NBA League Pass

November 17
10:30 p.m. (7:30 p.m. Pacific)

Recap

Houston Rockets 100, Los Angeles Clippers 106
Scoring by quarter: 23–29, 27–19, 27–31, 23–27
Pts: Alperen Şengün 23; Rebs: Şengün, VanVleet 8 each Asts: Fred VanVleet 10	Pts: Kawhi Leonard 26; Rebs: James Harden 9 Asts: James Harden 7

Crypto.com Arena, Los Angeles, CA
Attendance: 19,370
Referees:
- No. 61 Courtney Kirkland
- No. 13 Ashley Moyer-Gleich
- No. 63 Derek Richardson

NBA League Pass

November 24
8:00 p.m. (7:00 p.m. Central)

Recap

Denver Nuggets 86, Houston Rockets 105
Scoring by quarter: 19–29, 24–31, 26–24, 17–21
Pts: Nikola Jokić 38; Rebs: Nikola Jokić 19; Asts: Nikola Jokić 8	Pts: Jalen Green 25; Rebs: Şengün, Smith 14 each Asts: Fred VanVleet 11

Toyota Center, Houston, TX
Attendance: 18,055
Referees:
- No. 77 Karl Lane
- No. 68 Jacyn Goble
- No. 89 Dannica Mosher

NBA League Pass

November 24
10:30 p.m. (7:30 p.m. Pacific)

Recap

New Orleans Pelicans 116, Los Angeles Clippers 106
Scoring by quarter: 36–23, 20–32, 29–28, 31–23
Pts: Zion Williamson 32; Rebs: Daniels, Valančiūnas 8 each Asts: Daniels, Ingram, Williamson 5 each	Pts: Paul George 34; Rebs: Paul George 8 Asts: James Harden 10

Crypto.com Arena, Los Angeles, CA
Attendance: 19,370
Referees:
- No. 48 Scott Foster
- No. 52 Scott Twardoski
- No. 41 Nate Green

NBA League Pass

November 28
8:30 p.m. (7:30 p.m. Central)

Recap

Houston Rockets 115, Dallas Mavericks 121
Scoring by quarter: 22–29, 28–25, 38–30, 27–37
Pts: Alperen Şengün 31; Rebs: Şengün, Smith 9 each Asts: Fred VanVleet 12	Pts: Luka Dončić 41; Rebs: Luka Dončić 9 Asts: Luka Dončić 9

American Airlines Center, Dallas, TX
Attendance: 20,103
Referees:
- No. 48 Scott Foster
- No. 50 Gediminas Petraitis
- No. 9 Natalie Sago

=== West group C ===
Pos	Team	Pld	W	L	PF	PA	PD	Qualification	SAC	MIN	GSW	OKC	SAS
1	Sacramento Kings	4	4	0	482	452	+30	Advance to knockout stage	—	124–111	124–123	105–98	129–120
2	Minnesota Timberwolves	4	3	1	438	438	0		111–124	—	104–101	106–103	117–110
3	Golden State Warriors	4	2	2	483	479	+4		123–124	101–104	—	141–139	118–112
4	Oklahoma City Thunder	4	1	3	463	439	+24		98–105	103–106	139–141	—	123–87
5	San Antonio Spurs	4	0	4	429	487	−58		120–129	110–117	112–118	87–123	—

Source: NBA
Rules for classification: Tiebreakers

Games

Note: Times are Eastern Time (UTC−4 or UTC−5) as listed by the NBA. If the venue is located in a different time zone, the local time is also given.

NBA League Pass

November 3
8:00 p.m. (7:00 p.m. Central)

Recap

Golden State Warriors 141, Oklahoma City Thunder 139
Scoring by quarter: 38–33, 31–34, 37–39, 35–33
Pts: Stephen Curry 30; Rebs: Stephen Curry 8 Asts: Chris Paul 13	Pts: Luguentz Dort 29; Rebs: Chet Holmgren 8 Asts: Jalen Williams 8

Paycom Center, Oklahoma City, OK
Attendance: 16,827
Referees:
- No. 27 Mitchell Ervin
- No. 3 Nick Buchert
- No. 91 Che Flores

NBA League Pass

November 10
8:00 p.m. (7:00 p.m. Central)

Recap

Minnesota Timberwolves 117, San Antonio Spurs 110
Scoring by quarter: 22–27, 34–27, 34–19, 27–37
Pts: Karl-Anthony Towns 29; Rebs: Karl-Anthony Towns 12; Asts: Mike Conley Jr. 6	Pts: Vassell, Wembanyama 29 each Rebs: Victor Wembanyama 9 Asts: Collins, Sochan 5 each

Frost Bank Center, San Antonio, TX
Attendance: 18,354
Referees:
- No. 58 Josh Tiven
- No. 7 Lauren Holtkamp
- No. 12 CJ Washington

NBA League Pass

November 10
10:00 p.m. (7:00 p.m. Pacific)

Recap

Oklahoma City Thunder 98, Sacramento Kings 105
Scoring by quarter: 20–34, 22–19, 28–22, 28–30
Pts: Shai Gilgeous-Alexander 33; Rebs: Gilgeous-Alexander, Holmgren 7 each Asts: Shai Gilgeous-Alexander 6	Pts: Kevin Huerter 28; Rebs: Domantas Sabonis 12; Asts: Domantas Sabonis 13

Golden 1 Center, Sacramento, CA
Attendance: 18,097
Referees:
- No. 46 Ben Taylor
- No. 51 Aaron Smith
- No. 54 Ray Acosta

TNT

November 14
7:30 p.m. (6:30 p.m. Central)

Recap

San Antonio Spurs 87, Oklahoma City Thunder 123
Scoring by quarter: 25–28, 23–30, 18–33, 21–32
Pts: Champagnie, Collins 13 each Rebs: Victor Wembanyama 14; Asts: Devonte' Graham 7	Pts: Shai Gilgeous-Alexander 28; Rebs: Giddey, Holmgren 7 each Asts: Josh Giddey 7

Paycom Center, Oklahoma City, OK
Attendance: 18,203
Referees:
- No. 74 Curtis Blair
- No. 22 JB DeRosa
- No. 70 Phenizee Ransom

NBA League Pass

November 14
10:00 p.m. (7:00 p.m. Pacific)

Recap

Minnesota Timberwolves 104, Golden State Warriors 101
Scoring by quarter: 22–30, 32–29, 22–24, 28–18
Pts: Karl-Anthony Towns 33; Rebs: Rudy Gobert 13; Asts: Mike Conley Jr. 8	Pts: Brandin Podziemski 23; Rebs: Kevon Looney 12; Asts: Brandin Podziemski 5

Chase Center, San Francisco, CA
Attendance: 18,064
Referees:
- No. 39 Tyler Ford
- No. 51 Aaron Smith
- No. 28 Mousa Dagher

ESPN

November 17
7:30 p.m. (6:30 p.m. Central)

Recap

Sacramento Kings 127, San Antonio Spurs 120
Scoring by quarter: 29–31, 33–31, 33–32, 34–26
Pts: De'Aaron Fox 43; Rebs: Domantas Sabonis 14; Asts: Malik Monk 8	Pts: Zach Collins 28; Rebs: Johnson, Wembanyama 9 each Asts: Keldon Johnson 7

Frost Bank Center, San Antonio, TX
Attendance: 18,354
Referees:
- No. 60 James Williams
- No. 44 Brett Nansel
- No. 28 Mousa Dagher

NBA League Pass

November 24
8:00 p.m. (7:00 p.m. Central)

Recap

Sacramento Kings 124, Minnesota Timberwolves 111
Scoring by quarter: 38–31, 32–33, 22–15, 32–32
Pts: De'Aaron Fox 36; Rebs: Domantas Sabonis 11; Asts: De'Aaron Fox 12	Pts: Anthony Edwards 35; Rebs: Gobert, Towns 11 each Asts: Mike Conley Jr. 9

Target Center, Minneapolis, MN
Attendance: 18,024
Referees:
- No. 8 Marc Davis
- No. 30 John Butler
- No. 53 Matt Kallio

ESPN

November 24
10:00 p.m. (7:00 p.m. Pacific)

Recap

San Antonio Spurs 112, Golden State Warriors 118
Scoring by quarter: 35–32, 20–27, 26–27, 31–32
Pts: Devin Vassell 24; Rebs: Keldon Johnson 12; Asts: Zach Collins 6	Pts: Stephen Curry 35; Rebs: Looney, Šarić 8 each Asts: Chris Paul 10

Chase Center, San Francisco, CA
Attendance: 18,064
Referees:
- No. 25 Tony Brothers
- No. 64 Justin Van Duyne
- No. 40 Leon Wood

NBA League Pass

November 28
8:00 p.m. (7:00 p.m. Central)

Recap

Oklahoma City Thunder 103, Minnesota Timberwolves 106
Scoring by quarter: 29–19, 32–34, 17–23, 25–30
Pts: Shai Gilgeous-Alexander 32; Rebs: Chet Holmgren 8 Asts: Chet Holmgren 6	Pts: Anthony Edwards 21; Rebs: Rudy Gobert 16; Asts: Mike Conley Jr. 8

Target Center, Minneapolis, MN
Attendance: 18,024
Referees:
- No. 46 Ben Taylor
- No. 52 Scott Twardoski
- No. 20 Jenna Schroeder

TNT

November 28
10:00 p.m. (7:00 p.m. Pacific)

Recap

Golden State Warriors 123, Sacramento Kings 124
Scoring by quarter: 37–29, 35–26, 32–40, 19–29
Pts: Curry, Wiggins 29 each Rebs: Curry, Thompson 10 each Asts: Stephen Curry 6	Pts: De'Aaron Fox 29; Rebs: De'Aaron Fox 10; Asts: Domantas Sabonis 10

Golden 1 Center, Sacramento, CA
Attendance: 18,039
Referees:
- No. 60 James Williams
- No. 27 Mitchell Ervin
- No. 72 J. T. Orr

=== Ranking of second-placed teams ===
==== Eastern Conference ====
Pos	Grp	Team	Pld	W	L	PF	PA	PD	Qualification
1	B	New York Knicks	4	3	1	440	398	+42	Advance to knockout stage
2	A	Cleveland Cavaliers	4	3	1	474	445	+29	
3	C	Orlando Magic	4	3	1	446	424	+22	

Source: NBA
Rules for classification: Tiebreakers

==== Western Conference ====
Pos	Grp	Team	Pld	W	L	PF	PA	PD	Qualification
1	A	Phoenix Suns	4	3	1	480	446	+34	Advance to knockout stage
2	C	Minnesota Timberwolves	4	3	1	438	438	0	
3	B	Houston Rockets	4	2	2	424	414	+10	

Source: NBA
Rules for classification: Tiebreakers

== Knockout stage ==
=== Qualified teams ===
Eastern Conference

Pos	Team	Pld	W	L	PF	PA	PD
1	Milwaukee Bucks	4	4	0	502	456	+46
2	Indiana Pacers	4	4	0	546	507	+39
3	Boston Celtics	4	3	1	449	422	+27
4	New York Knicks	4	3	1	440	398	+42

Source: NBA
Rules for classification: Tiebreakers

Western Conference

Pos	Team	Pld	W	L	PF	PA	PD
1	Los Angeles Lakers	4	4	0	494	420	+74
2	Sacramento Kings	4	4	0	482	452	+30
3	New Orleans Pelicans	4	3	1	463	430	+33
4	Phoenix Suns	4	3	1	480	446	+34

Source: NBA
Rules for classification: Tiebreakers

=== Bracket ===
Home team listed first (quarterfinals only).

Quarterfinals
December 5 – Milwaukee, WI
1 Milwaukee	146
4 New York	122
December 4 – Indianapolis, IN
2 Indiana	122
3 Boston	112
December 5 – Los Angeles, CA
1 LA Lakers	106
4 Phoenix	103
December 4 – Sacramento, CA
2 Sacramento	117
3 New Orleans	127

Semifinals
December 7 – Las Vegas, NV
1 Milwaukee	119
2 Indiana	128
December 7 – Las Vegas, NV
1 LA Lakers	133
3 New Orleans	89

Championship game
December 9 – Las Vegas, NV
E2 Indiana	109
W1 LA Lakers	123

=== Quarterfinals ===
Note: Times are Eastern Standard Time (UTC−5) as listed by the NBA. If the venue is located in a different time zone, the local time is also given.

TNT

December 4
7:30 p.m.

Recap

Boston Celtics 112, Indiana Pacers 122
Scoring by quarter: 24–22, 31–26, 23–37, 34–37
Pts: Jayson Tatum 32; Rebs: Jayson Tatum 12; Asts: Derrick White 8	Pts: Tyrese Haliburton 26; Rebs: Haliburton, Turner 10 each Asts: Tyrese Haliburton 13

Gainbridge Fieldhouse, Indianapolis, IN
Attendance: 16,693
Referees:
- No. 8 Marc Davis
- No. 26 Pat Fraher
- No. 64 Justin Van Duyne

TNT

December 4
10:00 p.m. (7:00 p.m. Pacific)

Recap

New Orleans Pelicans 127, Sacramento Kings 117
Scoring by quarter: 35–36, 34–25, 31–30, 27–26
Pts: Brandon Ingram 30; Rebs: Jonas Valančiūnas 11; Asts: CJ McCollum 7	Pts: De'Aaron Fox 30; Rebs: Domantas Sabonis 13; Asts: Domantas Sabonis 10

Golden 1 Center, Sacramento, CA
Attendance: 18,048
Referees:
- No. 25 Tony Brothers
- No. 4 Sean Wright
- No. 30 John Butler

TNT

December 5
7:30 p.m. (6:30 p.m. Central)

Recap

New York Knicks 122, Milwaukee Bucks 146
Scoring by quarter: 35–37, 37–38, 24–37, 26–34
Pts: Julius Randle 41; Rebs: RJ Barrett 8 Asts: Jalen Brunson 6	Pts: Giannis Antetokounmpo 35; Rebs: G. Antetokounmpo, B. Lopez 8 each Asts: Giannis Antetokounmpo 10

Fiserv Forum, Milwaukee, WI
Attendance: 17,448
Referees:
- No. 15 Zach Zarba
- No. 77 Karl Lane
- No. 9 Natalie Sago

TNT

December 5
10:00 p.m. (7:00 p.m. Pacific)

Recap

Phoenix Suns 103, Los Angeles Lakers 106
Scoring by quarter: 23–33, 24–26, 35–24, 21–23
Pts: Kevin Durant 31; Rebs: Devin Booker 11; Asts: Devin Booker 6	Pts: LeBron James 31; Rebs: Anthony Davis 15; Asts: LeBron James 11

Crypto.com Arena, Los Angeles, CA
Attendance: 18,664
Referees:
- No. 58 Josh Tiven
- No. 37 Eric Dalen
- No. 49 Tom Washington

During the Kings-Pelicans game on December 4, a 34-year-old Kings fan named Gregorio "Greg" Florez Breedlove had a medical emergency during the first quarter of that game and died 20 minutes after emergency medical services arrived to try and help him out. A day later, during the Suns-Lakers game on December 5, the game's conclusion was met with serious controversy due to a controversial timeout that was given to the Lakers by the referees near the end of the game despite the Lakers not holding possession of the ball at the time the timeout was called. However, according to commissioner Adam Silver, it was considered the right call by the notion that Austin Reaves had his left hand on the ball while pinned under his left leg before it got loosened up again.

=== Semifinals ===
ESPN

December 7
5:00 p.m. (2:00 p.m. Pacific)

Recap

Indiana Pacers 128, Milwaukee Bucks 119
Scoring by quarter: 27–29, 36–22, 28–43, 37–25
Pts: Tyrese Haliburton 27; Rebs: Buddy Hield 11; Asts: Tyrese Haliburton 15	Pts: Giannis Antetokounmpo 37; Rebs: Giannis Antetokounmpo 10; Asts: Damian Lillard 7

T-Mobile Arena, Las Vegas, NV
Attendance: 16,837
Referees:
- No. 60 James Williams
- No. 50 Gediminas Petraitis
- No. 22 JB DeRosa

TNT

December 7
9:00 p.m. (6:00 p.m. Pacific)

Recap

New Orleans Pelicans 89, Los Angeles Lakers 133
Scoring by quarter: 30–29, 24–38, 17–43, 18–23
Pts: Trey Murphy III 14; Rebs: Dyson Daniels 8 Asts: Brandon Ingram 7	Pts: LeBron James 30; Rebs: Anthony Davis 15; Asts: LeBron James 8

T-Mobile Arena, Las Vegas, NV
Attendance: 18,017
Referees:
- No. 48 Scott Foster
- No. 34 Kevin Cutler
- No. 13 Ashley Moyer-Gleich

=== Championship game ===
ABC

December 9
8:30 p.m. (5:30 p.m. Pacific)

Recap

Indiana Pacers 109, Los Angeles Lakers 123
Scoring by quarter: 29–34, 31–31, 22–25, 27–33
Pts: Haliburton, Mathurin 20 each Rebs: Myles Turner 7 Asts: Tyrese Haliburton 11	Pts: Anthony Davis 41; Rebs: Anthony Davis 20; Asts: D'Angelo Russell 7

T-Mobile Arena, Las Vegas, NV
Attendance: 19,021
Referees:
- No. 16 David Guthrie
- No. 39 Tyler Ford
- No. 27 Mitchell Ervin

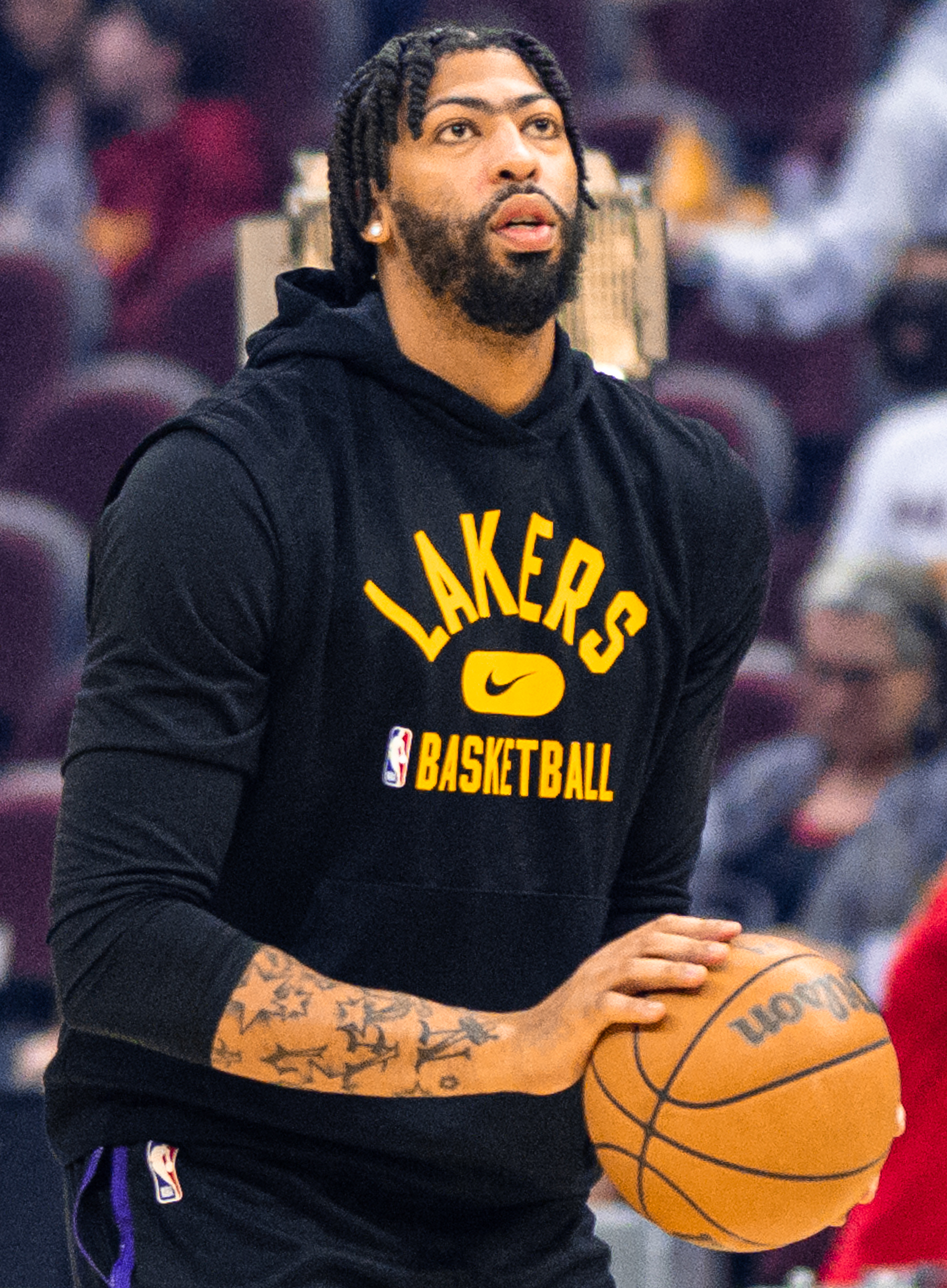
Anthony Davis recorded 41 points, 20 rebounds, 5 assists and 4 blocks in the championship game

Buddy Hield of Indiana scored the game's first basket when he hit a three-pointer. However, the Lakers quickly took control of the first quarter and led 20–15 after six minutes. After one frame, the Lakers led 34–29 with 26 points coming inside the paint. The teams went into half-time with a 65–60 advantage for Los Angeles.

The second half opened up with a LeBron James and-one play, and the Lakers quickly captured a 10-point lead. Despite cutting the lead to a five-point lead at one point, the Pacers went into the fourth quarter trailing 90–82.

The final quarter saw the Pacers crawl back into the game, cutting the lead down to two with 10:30 to go. However, Indiana was unable to keep up with the Lakers offense and were trailing by ten points with four and a half minutes left. Indiana center Myles Turner fouled out after fouling Anthony Davis and picking up his sixth foul, with 4:09 to go in the game. Davis scored 10 straight points as part of the 13–0 run that gave the Lakers a 16-point lead with 3:11 remaining in the game. By then, the Lakers comfortably played the game out. The Lakers dominated the Pacers inside, edging them with an 86–44 edge in points in the paint.

The Lakers became the first team to win the NBA Cup. Anthony Davis finished with 41 points on 16-for-24 shooting, 20 rebounds and 4 blocks; his performance was widely praised as a "masterpiece", with James describing it as a "Shaq-like performance". Davis became the first player in 36 years to record 40+ points, 20+ rebounds, 5+ assists and 4+ blocks, and was the third Laker to achieve this feat following Elgin Baylor and Wilt Chamberlain. Tyrese Haliburton finished with 20 points and 11 assists, while Bennedict Mathurin scored 20 as well.

Starters:			Pts	Reb	Ast
G	0	Tyrese Haliburton	20	1	11
G	11	Bruce Brown Jr.	4	2	1
F	7	Buddy Hield	8	5	4
F	1	Obi Toppin	13	2	0
C	33	Myles Turner	10	7	1
Reserves:					
G/F	00	Bennedict Mathurin	20	2	0
F	22	Isaiah Jackson	10	5	0
G/F	23	Aaron Nesmith	15	3	1
G	9	T. J. McConnell	8	4	9
F	5	Jarace Walker	0	0	0
G	21	Isaiah Wong	0	0	0
G/F	10	Kendall Brown	0	0	0
G	26	Ben Sheppard	0	0	0
C	44	Oscar Tshiebwe	0	1	0
F	13	Jordan Nwora	DNP		
Head coach:
Rick Carlisle

Indiana	Los Angeles

Indiana	Statistics	Los Angeles
35/96 (36.8%)	Field goals	47/88 (53.4%)
10/41 (24.4%)	3-point field goals	2/13 (15.4%)
29/33 (87.9%)	Free throws	27/35 (77.1%)
9	Offensive rebounds	12
23	Defensive rebounds	43
32	Total rebounds	55
27	Assists	25
7	Turnovers	18
10	Steals	5
7	Blocks	10
33	Fouls	25
44	Points in the paint	86
18	Fast break points	21
3	Biggest lead	16
54	Bench points	30
8	Points off turnovers	21

Starters:			Pts	Reb	Ast
G	1	D'Angelo Russell	13	4	7
G	12	Taurean Prince	6	3	2
F	5	Cam Reddish	9	3	1
F	23	LeBron James	24	11	4
C	3	Anthony Davis	41	20	5
Reserves:					
F	28	Rui Hachimura	0	2	0
F	2	Jarred Vanderbilt	0	4	1
G	15	Austin Reaves	28	2	3
G	10	Max Christie	2	2	1
F/C	11	Jaxson Hayes	0	4	1
G	0	Jalen Hood-Schifino	0	0	0
F	21	Maxwell Lewis	0	0	0
F/C	35	Christian Wood	DNP		
Head coach:
Darvin Ham

== Awards ==
The Los Angeles Lakers won the NBA Cup. LeBron James won the inaugural Most Valuable Player award, following his averages of 26.4 points, 8.0 rebounds, 7.0 assists, while shooting 56.8% from the field and 60.6% on threes. On December 11, the NBA announced the All-Tournament Team.

All-NBA In-Season Tournament Team
Pos.	Player	Team
G	Tyrese Haliburton	Indiana Pacers
F	Giannis Antetokounmpo	Milwaukee Bucks
F	Kevin Durant	Phoenix Suns
F	LeBron James (MVP)	Los Angeles Lakers
C	Anthony Davis	Los Angeles Lakers

== Marketing ==
=== The Heist ===
On October 25, one week before the start of group play the NBA debuted "The Heist," a series of short films used to promote the tournament. "The Heist" features seven NBA all-stars: Anthony Davis, Demar Derozan, Darius Garland, Draymond Green, Kawhi Leonard, Julius Randle, Trae Young and Emmy winning actor Michael Imperioli attempting to take the NBA Cup trophy from a Las Vegas casino.

=== Anthem ===
The official anthem for the tournament was a re-recorded version of "Mama Said Knock You Out" by LL Cool J combined with The Roots "Here I Come." The song was prominently featured in promotional videos for the tournament. The Anthem was played before the start of each game throughout the group stage and knockout rounds.

== Media coverage ==
The group stage of the tournament was covered by the NBA's existing broadcasters.

In national linear television broadcasts in the United States, TNT had selected Tuesday games, ESPN aired selected Friday games, and NBA TV had two on Friday, November 24. Most group stage games were instead only televised locally by the teams' regional broadcasters. During the knockout stage, TNT aired all four quarterfinals in prime time on December 4 and 5. For the semifinals on December 7, ESPN televised the early game and TNT had the late game. The championship game aired on ABC in prime time on December 9.

TruTV also aired three alternative telecasts of quarterfinal and semifinal games that air on TNT during the knockout round.

The championship game was the first year of a two year deal that saw the game broadcast on ABC (including local stations KABC-TV in Los Angeles and WRTV in Indianapolis). The game was the most-viewed game of the season with 4.58 million viewers. It was also the most-watched non-Christmas regular season game since 2018. ESPN2 also aired an alternate telecast for the championship game on December 9.

All TNT's games were streamed on Max including two exclusive alternate telecast of quarterfinal games on December 5. NBA League Pass offered out-of-market group stage games, as well as live access to NBA TV's games.

In Canada, national coverage of all Toronto Raptors games and other selected games were split between TSN, Sportsnet, and NBA TV Canada.

=== Semifinal ESPN/TNT broadcast collaboration ===
Ahead of the semifinals, ESPN and TNT announced that their broadcast teams would collaborate on each other's coverage. For ESPN, TNT's Reggie Miller joined Mike Breen, Doris Burke and Lisa Salters, while on TNT, ESPN's Doc Rivers joined Kevin Harlan, Candace Parker and Allie LaForce. TNT's Inside the NBA (including NBA Tip-off) studio team of Ernie Johnson Jr., Kenny Smith, Charles Barkley and Shaquille O'Neal also collaborated with their ESPN counterparts, the NBA Countdown studio team of Malika Andrews, Stephen A. Smith, Michael Wilbon, Bob Myers and Adrian Wojnarowski, during the other network's coverage. Specifically, it was announced that the Inside the NBA team would appear on NBA Countdown while Smith and Wilbon would appear on Inside the NBA.

== Aftermath ==
Commissioner Adam Silver told in a press conference after the championship game that he was satisfied with the inaugural In-Season Tournament and is open to changes to the format, including the tie-breakers in the group play and the alternate colored courts that were used during the tournament.

On December 19, the Lakers celebrated their win by hanging a championship banner in the Crypto.com Arena to honour their In-Season Tournament victory, ahead of their regular season game against the New York Knicks.
