= List of NBA referees =

Referees in the National Basketball Association (NBA) oversee 120 preseason games, 1,260 regular season games, and four rounds of playoff matches. These officials "oversee competition in real-time between 10 exceptional athletes, making calls with 95% accuracy."

In March 2015, the NBA began issuing "Last Two Minutes" reports that detail the performance of referees at the ends of games when the point differential is within five points with two minutes or less remaining in the contest.

== Officials ==
For the 2025–26 NBA season, there are 74 staff officials and 7 non-staff officials.

Staff officials
No.	Name
54	Ray Acosta
67	Brandon Adair
36	Brent Barnaky
89	Dannica Baroody
74	Curtis Blair
25	Tony Brothers
3	Nick Buchert
30	John Butler
19	James Capers
11	Derrick Collins
56	John Conley
33	Sean Corbin
34	Kevin Cutler
28	Mousa Dagher
37	Eric Dalen
8	Marc Davis
14	JB DeRosa
27	Mitchell Ervin
91	Che Flores
39	Tyler Ford
45	Brian Forte
48	Scott Foster
26	Pat Fraher
68	Jacyn Goble
10	John Goble
35	Jason Goldenberg
41	Nate Green
16	David Guthrie
85	Robert Hussey
73	Intae Hwang
81	Simone Jelks
53	Matt Kallio
55	Bill Kennedy
61	Courtney Kirkland
32	Marat Kogut
77	Karl Lane
29	Mark Lindsay
23	Tre Maddox
7	Ed Malloy
94	Biniam Maru
82	Suyash Mehta
98	Sha'Rae Mitchell
71	Rodney Mott
13	Ashley Moyer-Gleich
43	Matt Myers
83	Andy Nagy
44	Brett Nansel
90	Pat O’Connell
72	JT Orr
50	Gediminas Petraitis
80	JD Ralls
70	Phenizee Ransom
93	Jenna Reneau
95	Tyler Ricks
9	Natalie Sago
20	Jenna Schroeder
86	Brandon Schwab
87	Danielle Scott
78	Evan Scott
24	Kevin Scott
51	Aaron Smith
38	Michael Smith
17	Jonathan Sterling
46	Ben Taylor
21	Dedric Taylor
58	Josh Tiven
52	Scott Twardoski
64	Justin Van Duyne
31	Scott Wall
12	CJ Washington
60	James Williams
40	Leon Wood
4	Sean Wright
15	Zach Zarba

Non-staff officials
No.	Name
88	Agon Abazi
75	Gina Catanzariti
84	Nate Cearley
92	Brent Haskill
97	Klajdi Mulla
79	Chelisa Painter
76	Marcy Williams
