= Sha'Rae Mitchell =

American basketball referee

Personal information
- Born: November 12, 1985 (age 41) Provo, Utah, U.S.

Career information
- College: UC Santa Barbara (2004–2008)
- Position: Guard (as player)
- Officiating career: 2017–present

Sha’Rae Mitchell (born November 12, 1985) is an American basketball referee and former player. She became a full-time National Basketball Association (NBA) referee in the 2023 season after serving as a non-staff official in the 2022 season. Mitchell previously officiated in the NBA G League, the Women's National Basketball Association (WNBA), and various college basketball conferences.

== Biography ==
Mitchell was born in Provo, Utah, and grew up in California. She played college basketball at UC Santa Barbara from 2004 to 2008, primarily as a guard.

== Officiating career ==
=== College basketball ===
Mitchell began officiating college basketball after completing her playing career. She worked as a referee in the Pac-12 Conference, West Coast Conference, Big Sky Conference, and Western Athletic Conference.

=== Professional officiating ===
Mitchell officiated in the NBA G League for five years and worked two seasons in the WNBA before being called up to the NBA.

== Notable games & achievements ==
On January 1, 2022, Mitchell officiated her first NBA regular-season game between the Detroit Pistons and the San Antonio Spurs.

- In October 2023, she was promoted to full-time NBA referee status after officiating 11 games as a non-staff official the previous season.

== See also ==
- List of NBA referees
- Ashley Moyer-Gleich – NBA referee
- Violet Palmer – First woman to referee an NBA game
- Lauren Holtkamp – Another female NBA referee
