= Last two minutes =

Last two minutes may refer to:

- Last Two Minutes report, officiating report issued by the National Basketball Association (NBA)
- Two-minute warning, pause in play toward the end of an American football game
