= Joe DeRosa =

Joe DeRosa may refer to:

- Joe DeRosa (comedian) (born 1977), American stand-up comedian
- Joe DeRosa (referee) (born 1957), American basketball referee
