= 2014 NCAA Division I men's basketball championship game =

Men's college basketball tournament game

National championship game
Kentucky Wildcats	UConn Huskies
SEC	AAC
(29–10)	(31–8)
54	60
Head coach: John Calipari	Head coach: Kevin Ollie
- AP: NR
- Coaches: NR
- AP: 18
- Coaches: 19
	1st half	2nd half	Total
Kentucky Wildcats	31	23	54
UConn Huskies	35	25	60
- Date: April 7, 2014
- Venue: AT&T Stadium, Arlington, Texas
- MVP: Shabazz Napier, Connecticut
- Favorite: Kentucky by 3
- Referees: Doug Shows, Verne Harris, Joe DeRosa
- Attendance: 79,238
- National anthem: Darius Rucker and the Booker T. Washington High School for the Performing and Visual Arts Jazz Singers

United States TV coverage
- Network: CBS
- Announcers: Jim Nantz (play-by-play); Greg Anthony and Steve Kerr (color); Tracy Wolfson (sideline)
- Nielsen Ratings: 12.4 (21.2 million)

The 2014 NCAA Division I men's basketball championship game was the final game of the 2014 NCAA Division I men's basketball tournament and determined the national champion for the 2013–14 NCAA Division I men's basketball season. The game was played on April 7, 2014, at AT&T Stadium in Arlington, Texas, between the East Regional Champions, seventh-seeded Connecticut, and the Midwest Regional Champions, eighth-seeded Kentucky.

UConn got out to a quick start, leading by 15 points in the first half. Kentucky fought back, narrowing the gap to 35–31 at halftime. In the second half, Kentucky got within one point on several occasions, but never took the lead. UConn pulled away in the final minute, winning the game, 60–54.

== Overview ==
The 2014 NCAA Men's Division I Basketball Championship Game was played on April 7, 2014, at AT&T Stadium in Arlington, Texas. It featured the East Regional Champions, seventh-seeded Connecticut (UConn) against the Midwest Regional Champions, eighth-seeded Kentucky. Although Connecticut won the 2011 championship, and Kentucky the 2012 edition, neither team made the 2013 tournament. It was the first championship game since 1966 in which neither finalist was in the previous year's tournament (in 2013, Kentucky participated in the NIT, losing in the first round, while UConn was ineligible for 2013 postseason tournament play due to sanctions imposed on the program for previous years' APR violations). These two teams also met in the Final Four during Connecticut's previous national championship run in 2011, with the Huskies winning 56–55 before beating Butler in the final.

The 2014 national championship game featured the highest combined seeds in NCAA history, surpassing 2011's number 8 vs. number 3 match-up. It was the first ever to not feature a number 1, a number 2, or a number 3 seed. It is the third national championship game not to feature a number 1 or a number 2 seed, with the other two being the 1989 national championship game between number 3 Michigan and number 3 Seton Hall, in which Michigan won, 80–79, in overtime, and the 2011 national championship game between number 3 Connecticut and Butler in which Connecticut won, 53–41.

Kentucky was considered the pre-game favorite. The referees for the game were Joe DeRosa, Verne Harris, and Doug Shows; the alternate was Mike Roberts.

== Participants ==
=== Kentucky Wildcats ===
With seven McDonald's All-Americans on their roster, the Kentucky Wildcats were ranked first in the preseason AP poll. In non-conference play, they went 10–3, losing to Michigan State, Baylor, and North Carolina. In Southeastern Conference (SEC) play, they went 12–6 and fell out of the AP top 25. They lost the finals of the SEC tournament to Florida.

Kentucky entered the 2014 NCAA tournament as an at-large selection, and were given the number 8 seed in the Midwest Region. They opened the 2014 NCAA Tournament with a 56–49 victory over Kansas State. In the next round of the NCAA Tournament, Kentucky handed Wichita State their only loss of the season, beating them 78–76. In the Sweet 16, they knocked off their in-state rival and defending (vacated) national champion, Louisville, 74–69 to advance to the Elite 8. In the Elite Eight, Aaron Harrison made a three-pointer with the score tied at 72–72 with 2.3 seconds left to beat Michigan and advance to the 2014 Final Four after Nik Stauskas missed a half-court shot which would have sent the game to overtime. In the Final Four, Kentucky faced Wisconsin. With the game tied 71–71 with 16 seconds left, Andrew Harrison fouled Traevon Jackson in the act of shooting. Jackson made two out of three free throws to take a 73–71 lead. With 5.7 seconds left, Aaron Harrison made a three-pointer that put Kentucky up 74–73. Jackson missed a last-second shot and Kentucky advanced to the national championship game.

Kentucky was the third number 8 seed to participate in the national championship game. In 1985, Villanova beat number 1 Georgetown 66–64 in the national championship game. In 2011, Butler lost to number 3 Connecticut 53–41 in the national championship game. The Wildcats were the ninth team to appear in the title game despite being unranked in the final AP poll since the poll began in 1948.

=== Connecticut Huskies ===
The Connecticut Huskies were ranked number 18 in the preseason AP poll and did not have any McDonald's All-American selections on their roster. They started 9–0, rising to #10, but quickly dropped out of the top 25 when they got off to a slow start in the American Athletic Conference (AAC). They ended up 12–6 in conference play and lost to Louisville—who had defeated UConn by 33 points in the final regular season game for both teams—in the AAC tournament finals 71–61.

UConn entered the 2014 NCAA Tournament as an at-large selection and was given the number 7 seed in the East Region. In the second round of the tournament, UConn pulled away from St. Joseph's, beating them 89–81 in overtime. In the third round, Shabazz Napier scored 25 points to beat Villanova 77–65. In the Sweet 16, DeAndre Daniels scored 27 points leading UConn to an 81–76 win over Iowa State to advance to the East Regional Finals. In the Elite Eight, Napier's 25 points were enough to outlast Gary Harris's 22 points and beat Michigan State 60–54 to advance to the Final Four. In the Final Four, Connecticut faced Florida, whom they had beaten 65–64 on December 2, 2013, at Gampel Pavilion on a Napier buzzer-beating shot. Florida jumped out to an early 16–4 lead in the rematch, but UConn turned things around and upset number 1 Florida, 63–53, ending Florida's 30-game winning streak. DeAndre Daniels had 20 points and 10 rebounds, becoming only the fourth player to do so in a national semifinal win in the last 25 years. (Carmelo Anthony of Syracuse had 33 points and 10 rebounds in a 95–84 victory over Texas in the 2003 Final Four. Corliss Williamson did it twice for Arkansas, once in 1994 in a 91–82 win over Arizona, and once in 1995 with 21 points and 10 rebounds in a 75–68 win over North Carolina. Chris Webber of Michigan achieved the feat in 1993 in an 81–78 win over Kentucky.)

UConn was the first number 7 seed to reach the national title game. Their 33-point loss to Louisville at end of the regular season is the largest defeat ever suffered by an eventual National Champion.

== Starting lineups ==
Kentucky	Position		Connecticut
Andrew Harrison	G		Ryan Boatright
Aaron Harrison	G		† Shabazz Napier
James Young	G		Niels Giffey
Julius Randle	F		DeAndre Daniels
Dakari Johnson	C	F	Phillip Nolan
† 2014 Consensus First Team All-American

== Game summary ==
CBS

April 7, 2014
8:10 pm CDT

Recap

#MW8 Kentucky Wildcats 54, #E7 Connecticut Huskies 60
Scoring by half: 31–35, 23–25
Pts: James Young – 20; Rebs: James Young – 7 Asts: Andrew Harrison – 5	Pts: Shabazz Napier – 22; Rebs: DeAndre Daniels, Lasan Kromah, Shabazz Napier – 6 Asts: Ryan Boatright, Shabazz Napier – 3

AT&T Stadium, Arlington, Texas
Attendance: 79,238
Referees: Verne Harris, Doug Shows, Joe DeRosa

UConn scored first, and got out to a quick start, in what USA Today described as "a physical, ugly game". Ryan Boatright and Shabazz Napier combined to score 12 points for an early 19–10 lead. Napier scored five more points as UConn jumped out to a 30–15 lead with six minutes to go in the half. Kentucky's James Young made a three pointer and then, Aaron Harrison followed up with the steal-and-dunk to cut the Connecticut lead to 30–20. The Wildcats switched to a zone on defense, which slowed down UConn's offensive attacks. Young and Harrison each made a three-pointer to cut the UConn lead to 33–26. Kentucky continued the comeback as Julius Randle and Marcus Lee each made baskets in the last minute of the first half to cut the UConn lead to 35–31 at the half.

UConn got off to a slow start in the second half, hitting just one of its first ten shots. In the early minutes, Kentucky cut the lead to one several times, but failed to take the lead. UConn built their lead to 48–39 with under 11 minutes to go. Then, with 10:40 to play, Young dribbled through three defenders and dunked the ball while being fouled in what was described as the best play of the game. The Wildcats scored the next six, again cutting the lead to one point. During that stretch Boatright turned his ankle on a routine pass but remained in the game. After Aaron Harrison missed an open three with 8:13 left, After a few possessions during which neither team scored, Napier hit a three-pointer at the 6:50 mark that appeared to end Kentucky's momentum. On Kentucky's subsequent possession Julius Randle drove to the basket for a layup to cut the lead back to two, and on the next play Huskies forward Niels Giffey responded with another three-point shot to put the Huskies back up by 5. At the 2:45 mark, DeAndre Daniels hit a short shot to put the Huskies up 58–52. With just under a minute to go and Kentucky down four, they elected not to foul. Near the end of the shot clock, Napier located an open Lasan Kromah who was then fouled as he attempted a short shot. After Kromah, who had the lowest free throw percentage of the Huskies on the court at 67% for the season, made both free throws, Aaron Harrison missed a three pointer and UConn dribbled out the clock for a 60–54 win. After the game, Kentucky coach John Calipari remarked, "We had our chances to win. We're missing shots, we're missing free throws."

The Huskies were only tied at 2–2 and 6–6 at the beginning of the game and never trailed en route to their fourth National Title. UConn improved their record to 4–0 in national championship games. The American Athletic Conference, in its first year of existence, claimed its first title. UConn became the lowest seed to win the tournament since Villanova beat Georgetown in 1985 as an 8 seed. Coach Kevin Ollie became the first coach to win the championship in his first tournament appearance since Steve Fisher did it in 1989. The second-year coach credited longtime UConn coach Jim Calhoun for the victory saying "Coach Calhoun, the greatest coach ever. He paved the way we just walked through it." Giffey, Napier, and Tyler Olander, who had been on UConn's 2011 championship team, became the first players in NCAA Division I men's basketball history to win national titles as freshmen and seniors.

Napier led UConn with 22 points, on 8 of 16 shooting, and 6 rebounds. He also had three assists. Ryan Boatright scored 14. Young was Kentucky's top scorer with 20. Randle had 10 points, 6 rebounds, and 4 assist. Napier was named the Most Outstanding Player of the Final Four for both his offense and defense (he held Aaron Harrison to 7 points). As a team UConn was 10 for 10 from the free throw line, while Kentucky was 13 of 24. UConn became the first team to make all their attempts in a title game, and finished the tournament with an 87.8% free throw rate. That surpassed St. John's 87.0% in 1969 for the best percentage in NCAA history.

The announced attendance for the game was 79,238, an NCAA record for a Tournament Final.

After UConn's win in the men's division, the following night their women's team beat Notre Dame for a sweep of both the men's and women's Division I basketball championships. UConn also accomplished this sweep in 2004, the only other time the feat was accomplished.

== Media coverage ==
The Championship Game was broadcast in the United States by CBS. Jim Nantz was the play-by-play man with Greg Anthony and Steve Kerr providing on-court commentary. Greg Gumbel and Ernie Johnson Jr. were the studio hosts. Charles Barkley, Seth Davis, Grant Hill, Clark Kellogg, and Kenny Smith provided studio commentary. ESPN International owned the broadcast rights outside the United States. Dan Shulman was the play-by-play announcer for the international audience, with Dick Vitale providing commentary. The broadcast averaged 21.2 million viewers and peaked at 24.3 million viewers between 11 pm and 11:30 pm.

Radio coverage in the United States was provided by Westwood One. The Championship Game was streamed live for free on NCAA.com.
