= Joe DeRosa (basketball) =

Basketball referee

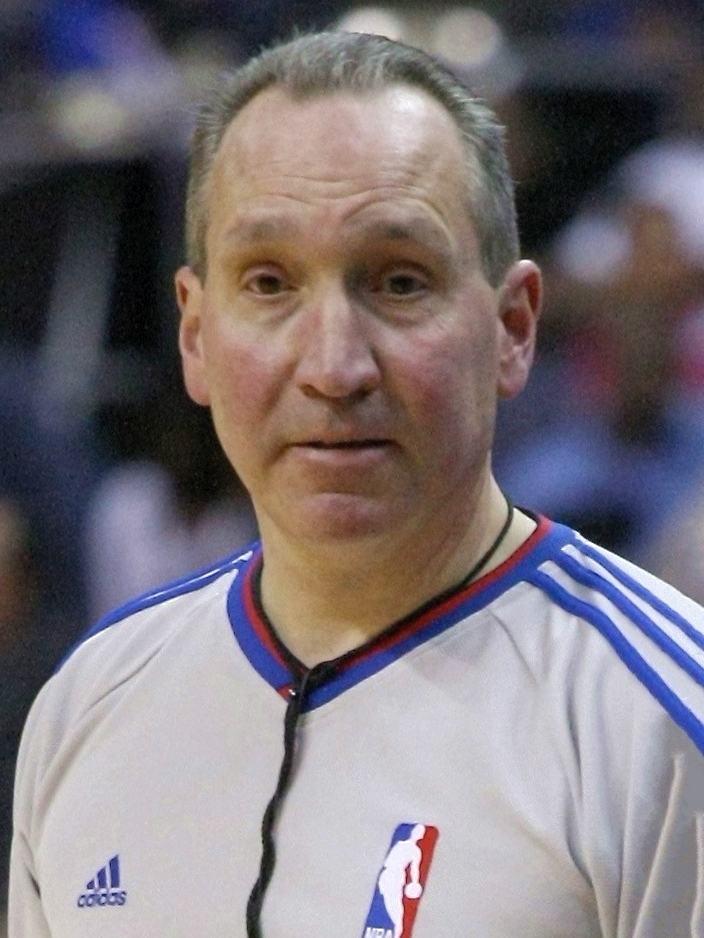
- DeRosa in 2009
- Born: Joseph M. DeRosa; April 11, 1957 (age 68); North Canton, Ohio, U.S.
- Occupation: Basketball referee
- Children: JB DeRosa

Joseph M. DeRosa (born April 11, 1957) is an American retired collegiate and professional basketball referee. DeRosa and Joe Forte are the only two people to have officiated both the NBA Finals and the NCAA Men's Final Four. He was one of the three officials selected to work the 2012 NCAA Men's Division I Basketball Tournament semifinal game between Louisville and Kentucky. DeRosa also officiated both the 2014 National Championship game between Kentucky and Connecticut, and the 2015 National Championship game between Duke and Wisconsin. He has officiated in the Southeastern and Big 12 Conferences since 2010. DeRosa started his officiating career as a high school referee in the Western Kentucky Region 1. While he owned a liquor store in Paducah, Kentucky.

Previously, he spent 22 seasons officiating in the National Basketball Association (NBA). During his time working as an NBA official he officiated over 1,500 regular-season games, 150 playoff games and 11 NBA Finals games. DeRosa has also conducted officiating clinics in Venezuela and France.

During game two of the 2010 Eastern Conference Finals, DeRosa was involved in an altercation with an Orlando Magic fan. The fan, Wyndham Vacation Ownership CEO Franz Hanning, was heckling him when DeRosa threw the game ball across the scorers' table at Hanning. The fan then threw the ball back at DeRosa, who had security eject Hanning. The NBA suspended him one game for the altercation.

DeRosa's son, JB DeRosa, is also a basketball referee. JB officiated both men's and women's college basketball at the NCAA Division I level, including the Ohio Valley Conference, the Atlantic 10 Conference and among others. He is now in his fifth season as an NBA referee.
