= Lauren Holtkamp =

American basketball referee

Lauren Holtkamp-Sterling
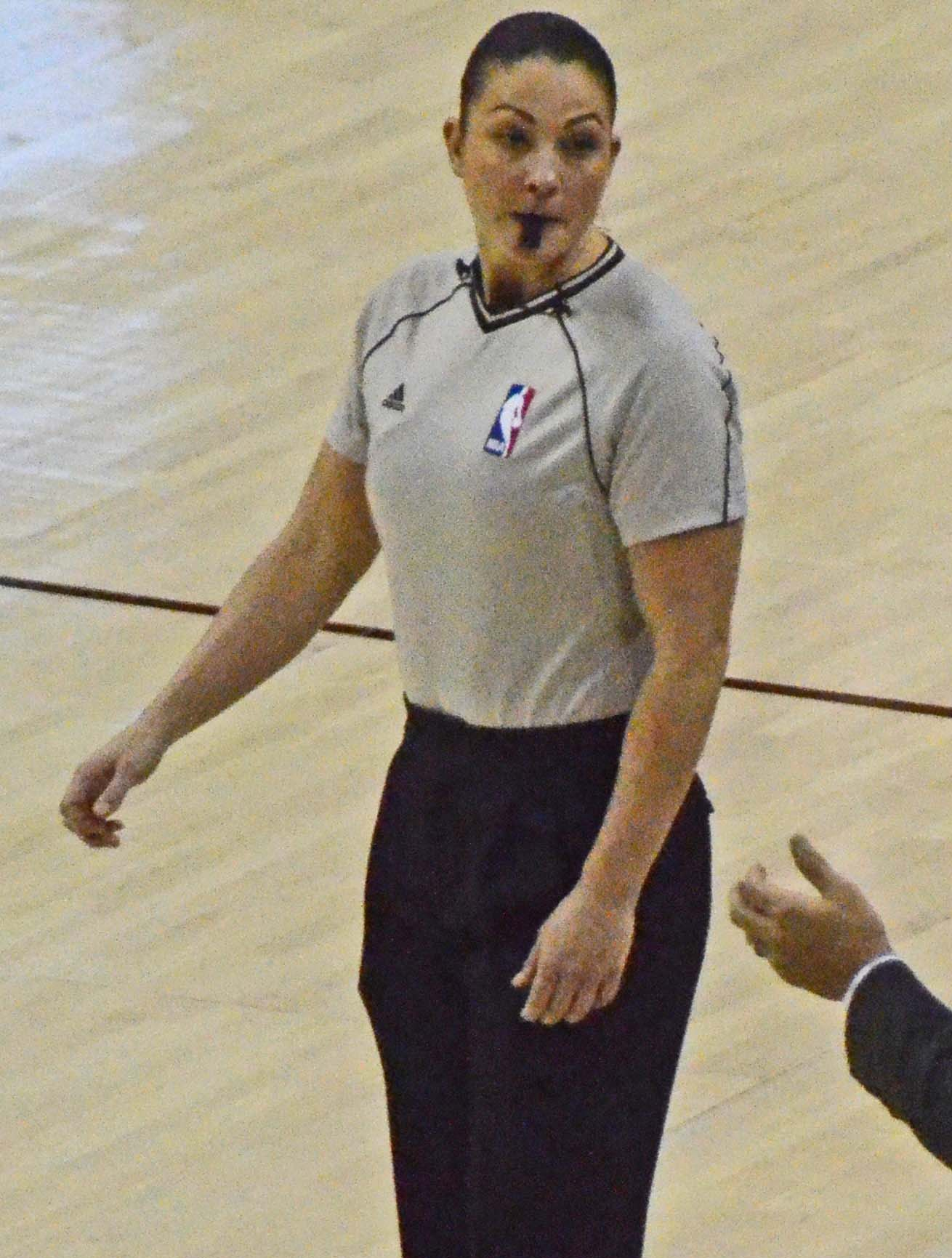
- Born: November 24, 1980 (age 45); Jefferson City, Missouri, U.S.
- Occupation: NBA referee
- Spouse: Jonathan Sterling (m. 2017)
- Children: 1

Lauren Holtkamp (born November 24, 1980) is a former professional basketball referee who worked in the National Basketball Association (NBA), wearing number 7. Holtkamp became the third woman to be a full-time NBA referee. Holtkamp also played college basketball at Drury University from 2000 to 2004. Holtkamp previously refereed the last five NBA Development League seasons before becoming a full-time referee for the 2014–15 NBA season. Holtkamp officiated four seasons in the WNBA including the WNBA 2014 conference finals. Holtkamp graduated from Emory University with a Master of Divinity. She also graduated from Drury University with both a Master of Arts in Communication and a Bachelor of Arts in Business Administration. In June 2017, Holtkamp married NBA referee Jonathan Sterling. In 2019, Holtkamp gave birth to their daughter.

On October 24, 2024, Holtkamp retired as an NBA referee, citing knee issues.

== Drury statistics ==
Legend
GP	Games played	GS	Games started	MPG	Minutes per game
FG%	Field goal percentage	3P%	3-point field goal percentage	FT%	Free throw percentage
RPG	Rebounds per game	APG	Assists per game	SPG	Steals per game
BPG	Blocks per game	PPG	Points per game	**Bold**	Career high

Year	Team	GP	Points	FG%	3P%	FT%	RPG	APG	SPG	BPG	PPG
2000-01	Drury	14	21	26.7%	0.0%	62.5%	1.2	0.1	0.3	0.1	1.5
2001-02	Drury	24	87	**48.5%**	0.0%	77.8%	2.9	0.5	0.2	**0.1**	3.6
2002-03	Drury	29	**136**	35.7%	0.0%	**83.0%**	**4.5**	**1.4**	**0.6**	0.1	**4.7**
2003-04	Drury	**31**	89	46.7%	0.0%	61.3%	2.4	0.6	0.2	0.0	2.9
Career		98	333	40.4%	0.0%	74.8%	3.0	0.8	0.3	0.1	3.4
