= Jonathan Sterling =

American basketball player and referee

- Born: April 16, 1982 (age 44)
- Occupation: NBA referee
- Spouse: Lauren Holtkamp (m. 2017)
- Children: 1

Jonathan Sterling (born April 16, 1982) is a professional basketball referee in the National Basketball Association (NBA), wearing number 17. Sterling also played college basketball at Flagler College where he earned his Bachelor of Arts degree in Business Management. Sterling previously refereed six NBA Development League seasons, three WNBA seasons and eight NCAA seasons before becoming a full-time referee for the 2017–18 NBA season. Sterling was raised in Satellite Beach, Florida. In June 2017, Sterling married NBA referee Lauren Holtkamp. In 2019, Holtkamp gave birth to their daughter.

On October 18, 2017, Sterling made his NBA official debut refereeing a regular season contest between Denver Nuggets and Utah Jazz at Vivint Arena.
