= Natalie Sago =

National Basketball Association referee

- Born: May 24, 1989 (age 36); Farmington, Missouri, U.S.
- Education: Farmington High School, Drury University, University Missouri-St. Louis
- Occupation: NBA referee

Natalie Sago (born May 24, 1989) is a professional basketball referee in the National Basketball Association (NBA), wearing number 9. Sago is the fifth woman to become a full-time NBA referee.

On November 15, 2018, the NBA announced that Sago was promoted to become a full-time member of the league's officiating staff; she previously officiated NBA games as a non-staff referee, as well as three full seasons in both the NBA Gatorade League and the WNBA.

Sago played college softball for Jefferson College from 2007 to 2009 and Drury University from 2009 to 2011. Sago earned a bachelor's degree in K-12 Physical Education from the University of Missouri–St. Louis.

Sago's father, Dr. Shelton Sago, officiated basketball for 35 years for the Missouri State High School Activities Association, retiring in 2019. He continues to officiate high school football.
