= JB DeRosa =

American basketball referee

- Born: April 14, 1991 (age 35); Paducah, Kentucky, U.S.
- Education: Malone University
- Occupation: NBA referee
- Parent: Joe DeRosa

JB DeRosa (born April 14, 1991) is an American professional basketball referee for the National Basketball Association (NBA), wearing number 22. As of the 2021–22 NBA season, DeRosa has officiated 256 regular-season games and 3 playoff games. He is in his sixth season as an NBA referee. DeRosa is the son of former NBA official Joe DeRosa.

== Early life ==
DeRosa was born on April 14, 1991, in Paducah, Kentucky. He graduated from GlenOak High School in Plain Township, Ohio.

== Officiating career ==
At 13-years-old DeRosa began his officiating career by refereeing local CYO and local recreational leagues in the Canton, Ohio, area. From 2009 to 2013, DeRosa officiated women's college basketball games in the Big East and Atlantic 10 conferences. DeRosa then officiated men's college basketball from 2014 to 2017 working in the SEC and Conference USA. DeRosa spent five seasons officiating for the NBA G League, where he worked the NBA G League Finals in 2016 and 2017. As of the 2021-22 NBA season DeRosa has officiated 256 regular-season games and 3 playoff games. He is in his sixth season as an NBA referee. On January 2, 2023, he officiated a game in which Donovan Mitchell scored 71 points against the Chicago Bulls.

== Personal life ==
DeRosa resides in Canton, Ohio. He graduated from Malone University in 2013.
