= Ashley Moyer-Gleich =

American basketball referee (born 1987)

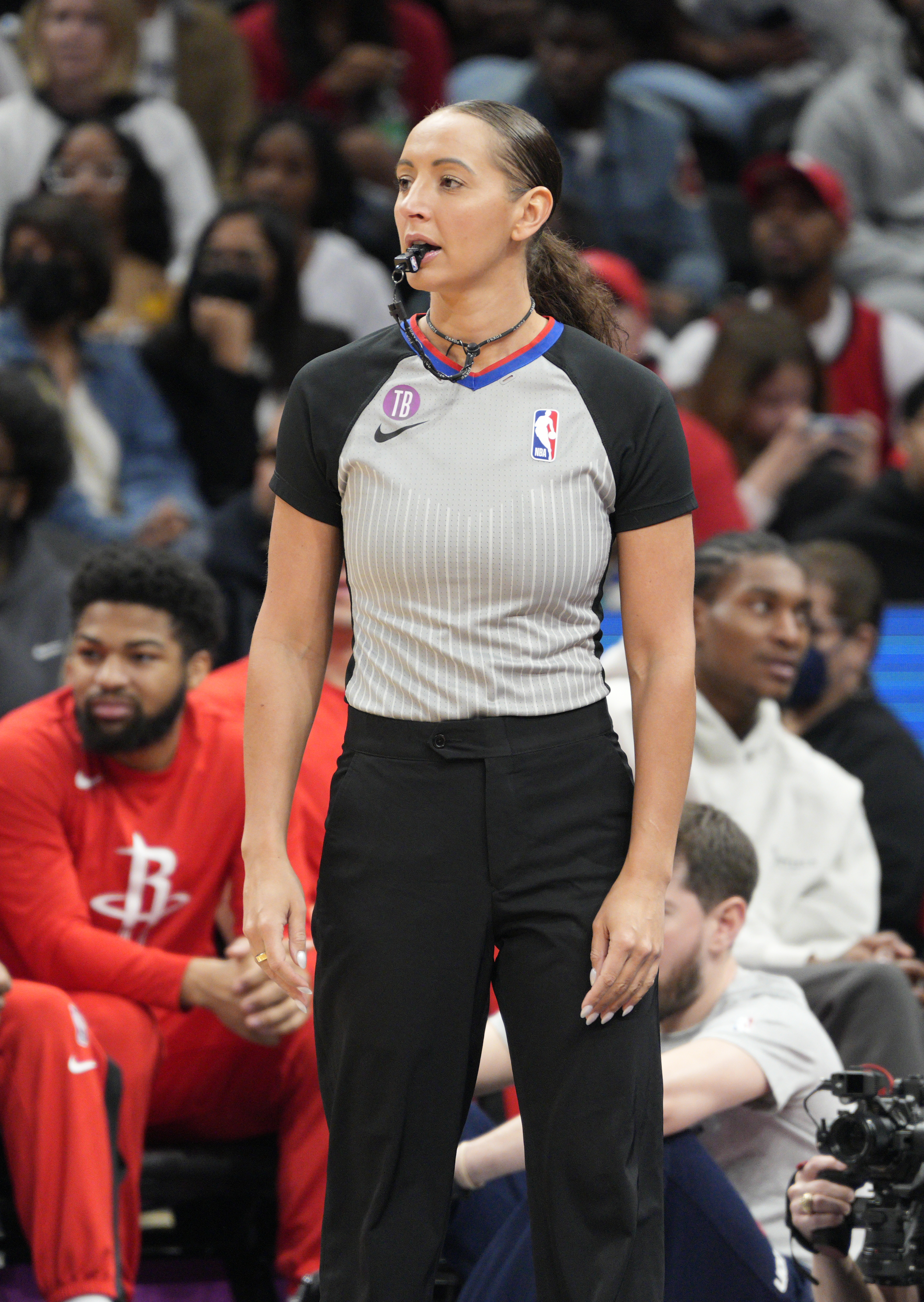
- Moyer-Gleich refereeing the game between the Rockets and Wizards, April 9, 2023

Personal information
- Born: August 5, 1987 (age 38) Lebanon, Pennsylvania, U.S.

Career information
- High school: Cedar Crest (Lebanon, Pennsylvania)
- College: Millersville (2006–2010)
- Officiating career: 2018–present

Ashley Moyer-Gleich (/ˌmɔɪər ˈɡliːʃ/ moy-ər-GLEESH; born August 5, 1987) is an American professional basketball referee in the National Basketball Association (NBA), wearing number 13. Moyer-Gleich became the fourth woman to be a full-time NBA referee. Moyer-Gleich played college basketball at Millersville University in Millersville, Pennsylvania. Moyer-Gleich previously refereed in NBA Gatorade League for two seasons and the 2018 WNBA season before becoming a full-time referee for the 2018-19 NBA season. On October 22, 2018, Moyer-Gleich made her NBA official debut refereeing a regular season contest between Indiana Pacers and Minnesota Timberwolves at Target Center. On November 15, 2018, the NBA announced that Moyer-Gleich was promoted to a full-time member of the league's officiating staff which she previously officiated three regular-season games and two preseason games as a non-staff referee.

In an anonymous 2023 survey of NBA players conducted by The Athletic, Moyer-Gleich received several votes for the "best ref" in the league. In 2024, the NBA selected Moyer-Gleich for a playoff assignment, making her the second woman to referee a playoff game after Violet Palmer.

== Biography ==
Ashley is married to NCAA referee and contractor Johnee Gleich. Moyer-Gleich's father Dave Moyer was Lebanon High School basketball teammates with former NBA center Sam Bowie.
