= Jaden Ivey =

American basketball player (born 2002)

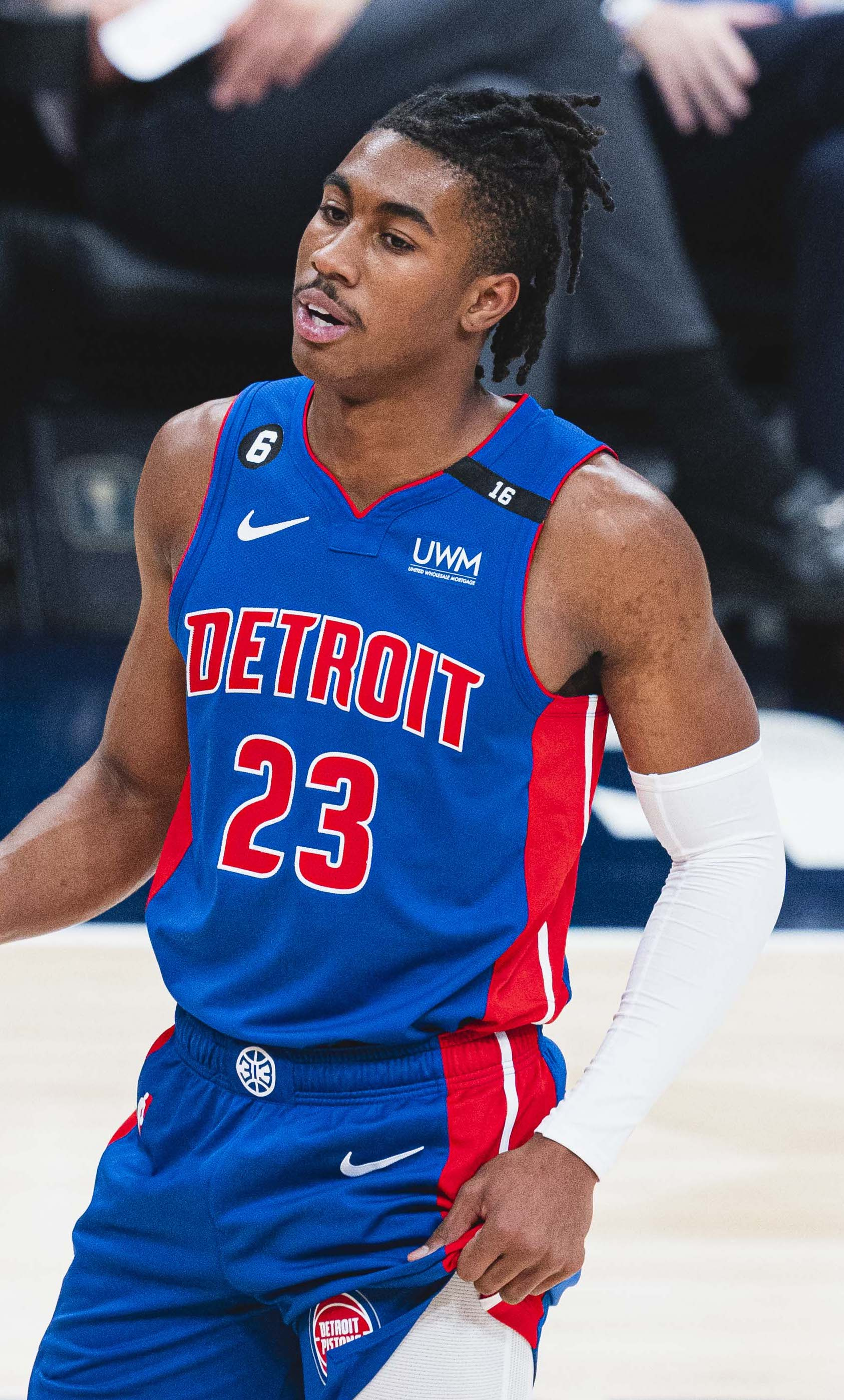
- Ivey with the Detroit Pistons in 2022

Free agent
- Position: Shooting guard

Personal information
- Born: February 13, 2002 (age 24) South Bend, Indiana, U.S.
- Listed height: 6 ft 3 in (1.91 m)
- Listed weight: 195 lb (88 kg)

Career information
- High school: Marian (Mishawaka, Indiana); La Lumiere School (La Porte, Indiana)
- College: Purdue (2020–2022)
- NBA draft: 2022: 1st round, 5th overall pick
- Drafted by: Detroit Pistons
- Playing career: 2022–present

Career history
- 2022–2026: Detroit Pistons
- 2026: Chicago Bulls

Career highlights
- NBA All-Rookie Second Team (2023); Consensus second-team All-American (2022); First-team All-Big Ten (2022); Big Ten All-Freshman Team (2021)
- Stats at NBA.com
- Stats at Basketball Reference
Medals
Men's basketball
Representing United States
FIBA Under-19 World Cup
Gold medal – first place	2021 Latvia	Team

Jaden Edward Dhananjay Ivey (born February 13, 2002) is an American professional basketball player who last played for the Chicago Bulls of the National Basketball Association (NBA). He played college basketball for the Purdue Boilermakers. Ivey has also played for the U.S. national under-19 team and the Detroit Pistons who drafted him in 2022. Ivey is the son of Niele Ivey, the coach for the Notre Dame women's basketball team.

== Early life ==
Ivey grew up playing football, basketball and soccer, and practicing karate. He started focusing on basketball as a freshman in high school. Ivey played for Marian High School in Mishawaka, Indiana in his first three years. For his senior season, he transferred to La Lumiere School in La Porte, Indiana, joining one of the top programs in the country. A consensus four-star recruit, he committed to playing college basketball for Purdue over offers from Butler and Notre Dame.

== College career ==
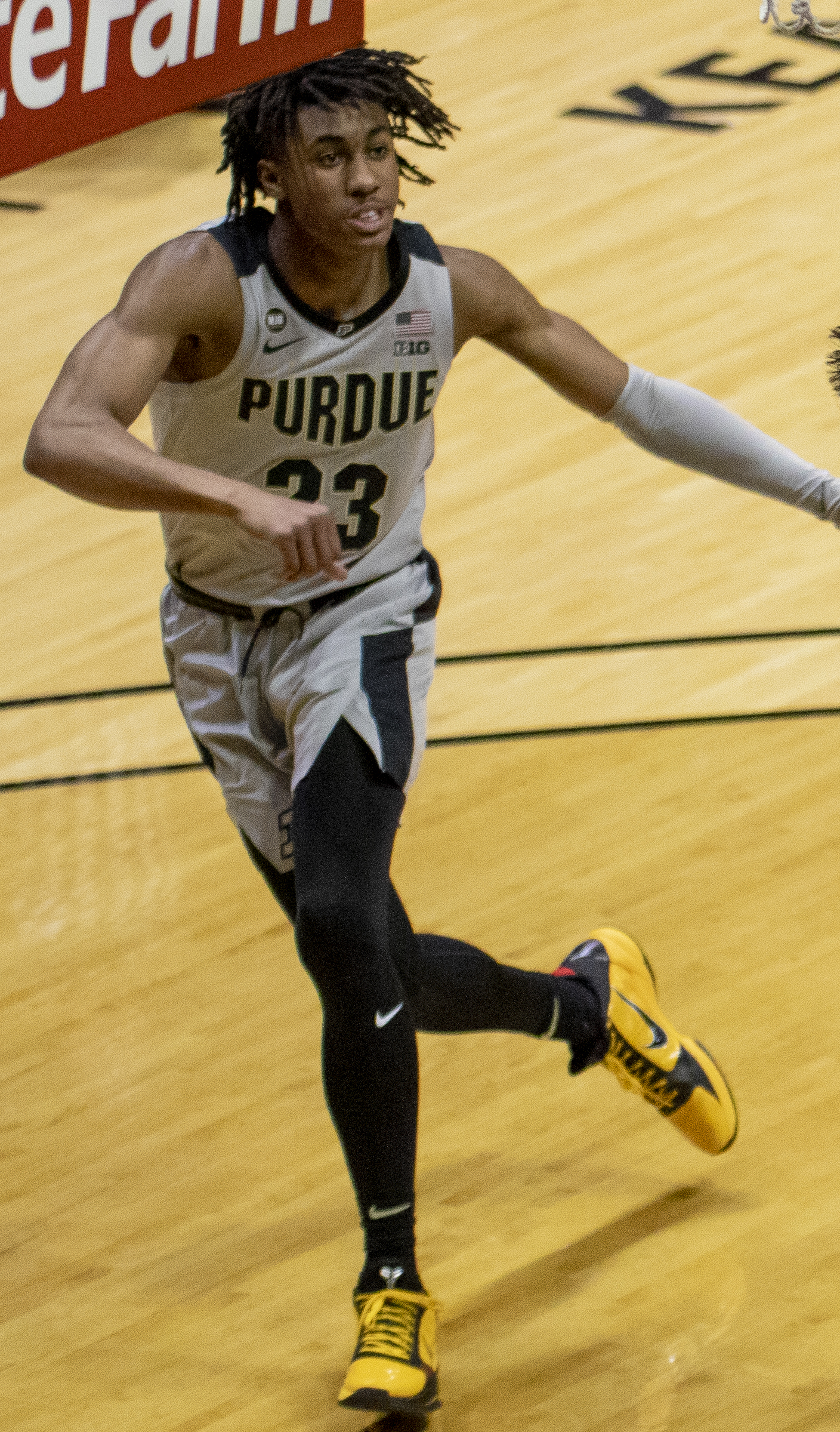
Ivey in January 2021

Early in his freshman season, Ivey missed five games with a foot injury. On January 19, 2021, he made a game-winning three-pointer with five seconds left as part of a 15-point performance in a 67–65 win over Ohio State. On March 19, Ivey scored a season-high 26 points in a 78–69 overtime loss to North Texas at the first round of the NCAA tournament. As a freshman, he averaged 11.1 points and 3.3 rebounds per game, earning Big Ten All-Freshman Team honors.

On November 12, 2021, Ivey scored 27 points in a 92–67 win over Indiana State. On January 30, 2022, he scored 21 points and hit the game-winning three-pointer with 0.6 seconds remaining in an 81–78 win over Ohio State. As a sophomore, he averaged 17.3 points, 4.9 rebounds and 3.1 assists per game. Ivey was named first-team All-Big Ten as well as the All-American Second Team. On March 31, 2022, Ivey declared for the 2022 NBA draft, forgoing his remaining college eligibility. He was a projected top-five pick in the draft.

== Professional career ==
=== Detroit Pistons (2022–2026) ===
Ivey was selected with the fifth overall pick in the 2022 NBA draft by the Detroit Pistons. He made his summer league debut on July 7 against the Portland Trail Blazers with 20 points, six rebounds, and six assists in an 81–78 win. On October 19, Ivey made his regular-season debut, putting up 19 points along with three rebounds and four assists in a 113–109 win over the Orlando Magic. On December 20, Ivey scored 30 points during a 126–111 loss to the Utah Jazz. On March 27, 2023, he scored a then career-high 32 points in a 126–117 loss to the Milwaukee Bucks.

On November 24, 2023, Ivey scored 25 points during an In-Season Tournament loss to the Indiana Pacers. On February 7, 2024, Ivey scored a career-high 37 points, and added six rebounds and seven assists in a 133–120 win over the Sacramento Kings.

On December 26, 2024, in a game against the Sacramento Kings with the Pistons trailing by three, Ivey connected on a corner three-pointer while being fouled by De'Aaron Fox and subsequently converted on a four-point play with 3.1 seconds remaining for a 114–113 Detroit victory. On January 1, 2025, Ivey suffered a broken left fibula after colliding with Orlando Magic guard Cole Anthony while attempting to retrieve a loose ball. The next day, it was announced that Ivey would likely miss the remainder of the season after undergoing surgery.

During the 2025 preseason, Ivey suffered a knee injury against the Memphis Grizzlies, sidelining him for the rest of the preseason. He underwent arthroscopic surgery to relieve right knee discomfort and missed at least four weeks of regular-season play. Ivey made 33 appearances (including two starts) for Detroit in the 2025–26 NBA season, averaging 8.2 points, 2.2 rebounds, and 1.6 assists.

=== Chicago Bulls (2026) ===
On February 3, 2026, Ivey was traded to the Chicago Bulls as part of a three-team trade that also included the Minnesota Timberwolves. He made four appearances for the Bulls, recording averages of 11.5 points, 4.8 rebounds, and 4.0 assists. On March 26, Ivey was ruled out for the remainder of the season due to a left knee injury.

On March 30, 2026, Ivey posted and live streamed on Instagram, where he made critical comments about the NBA's involvement in Pride Month activities, ultimately leading to him being waived by the team on the same day for "conduct detrimental to the team". He also made negative comments about Catholicism, calling it a "false religion". This came in the wake of several social media videos which lasted nearly an hour and an increase in evangelism in the Bulls locker room which agitated some team staff members. Ivey responded in a livestream hours after being waived, saying, "They're liars, bro. This is lying. [...] All I'm preaching about is Jesus Christ and they waived me. They say I'm crazy, right? I'm psycho." According to Joe Cowley of the Chicago Sun-Times, Ivey's penchant for evangelizing teammates, coaches and reporters likely led the Bulls to question whether he was capable of "act(ing) like a normal person around his brothers, his 14 other brothers". Cowley believed that Ivey was waived not for merely expressing anti-gay sentiments, but for a larger pattern of behavior that "doesn't go down in an NBA locker room".

== National team career ==
Ivey played for the United States at the 2021 FIBA Under-19 World Cup in Latvia. On July 3, 2021, he scored a team-high 21 points, shooting 7-of-11 from the field, in an 83–54 group-stage win over Turkey. Ivey averaged 12.3 points per game, helping his team win the gold medal, and was named to the all-tournament team.

== Career statistics ==
Legend
GP	Games played	GS	Games started	MPG	Minutes per game
FG%	Field goal percentage	3P%	3-point field goal percentage	FT%	Free throw percentage
RPG	Rebounds per game	APG	Assists per game	SPG	Steals per game
BPG	Blocks per game	PPG	Points per game	**Bold**	Career high

=== NBA ===
Year	Team	GP	GS	MPG	FG%	3P%	FT%	RPG	APG	SPG	BPG	PPG
2022–23	Detroit	74	**73**	**31.1**	.416	.343	.747	3.9	**5.2**	.8	.2	16.3
2023–24	Detroit	**77**	61	28.8	.429	.336	.749	3.4	3.8	.7	**.5**	15.4
2024–25	Detroit	30	30	29.9	**.460**	**.409**	.733	4.1	4.0	.9	.4	**17.6**
2025–26	Detroit	33	2	16.8	.450	.372	.789	2.2	1.6	.5	.4	8.2
2025–26	Chicago	4	3	28.8	.417	.381	**.889**	**4.8**	4.0	**2.0**	**.5**	11.5
Career		218	169	27.9	.430	.355	.749	3.5	4.0	.8	.4	14.8

=== College ===
Year	Team	GP	GS	MPG	FG%	3P%	FT%	RPG	APG	SPG	BPG	PPG
2020–21	Purdue	23	12	24.2	.399	.258	.726	3.3	1.9	.7	**.7**	11.1
2021–22	Purdue	**36**	**34**	**31.4**	**.460**	**.358**	**.744**	**4.9**	**3.1**	**.9**	.6	**17.3**
Career		59	46	28.6	.440	.322	.739	4.3	2.6	.8	.6	14.9

== Personal life ==
Ivey's mother, Niele Ivey, serves as head women's basketball coach at Notre Dame. She played in the WNBA for five seasons and was an All-American player at Notre Dame. Jaden's father, Javin Hunter, played for the Baltimore Ravens and San Francisco 49ers in the NFL. His grandfather, James Hunter, also played in the NFL for the Detroit Lions.

Ivey is a Christian. He was spotted street preaching his faith shortly following his departure from the Chicago Bulls on Good Friday.

Ivey's wife, but at the time girlfriend, Caitlyn gave birth to their son in 2023.
