= Buddy Boeheim =

American basketball player (born 1999)

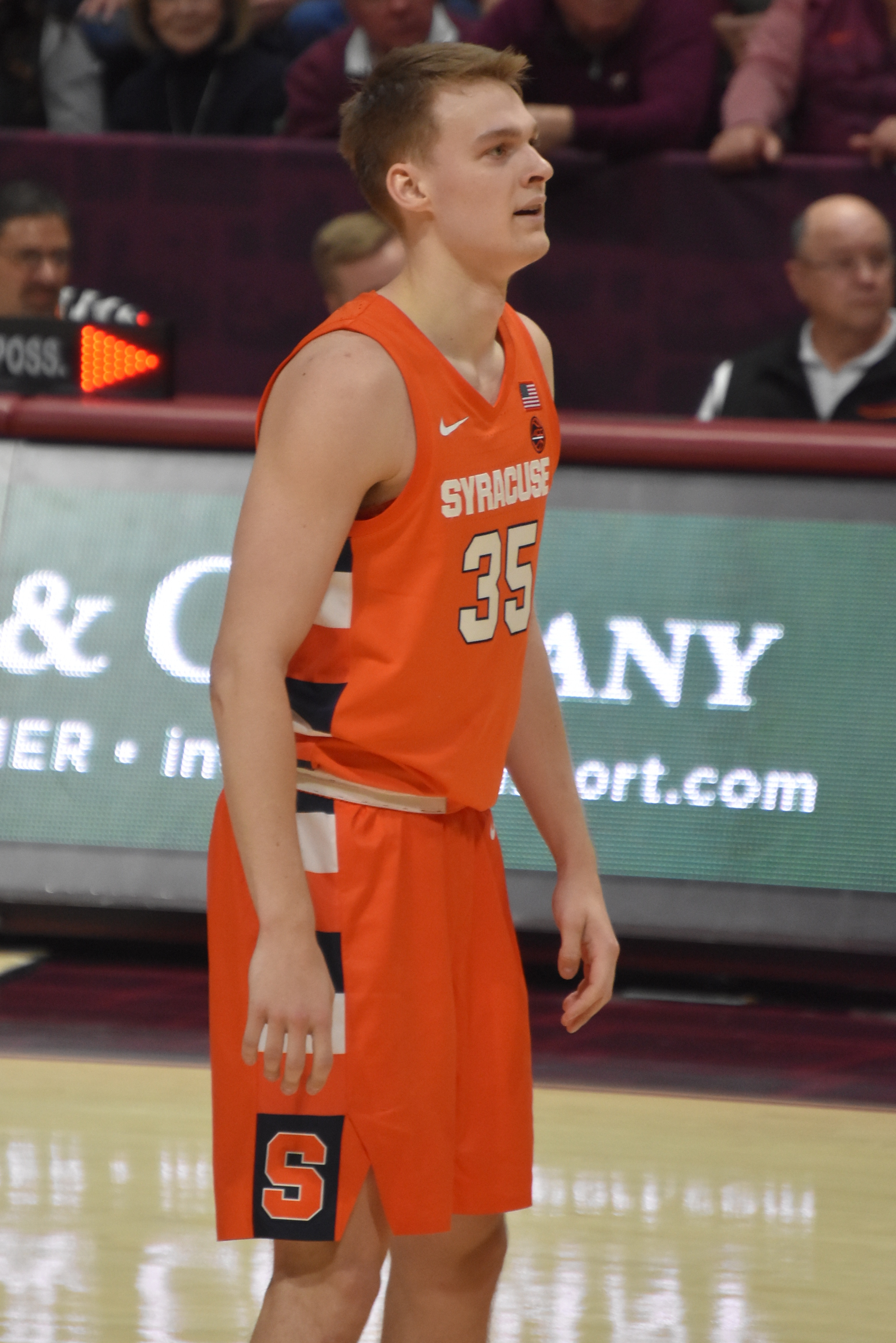
- Boeheim with Syracuse in 2020

No. 35 – Oklahoma City Blue
- Position: Shooting guard
- League: NBA G League

Personal information
- Born: November 11, 1999 (age 27) Fayetteville, New York, U.S.
- Listed height: 6 ft 5 in (1.96 m)
- Listed weight: 205 lb (93 kg)

Career information
- High school: Jamesville-DeWitt (DeWitt, New York); Brewster Academy (Wolfeboro, New Hampshire)
- College: Syracuse (2018–2022)
- NBA draft: 2022: undrafted
- Playing career: 2022–present

Career history
- 2022–2023: Detroit Pistons
- 2022–2023: →Motor City Cruise
- 2023–2024: Motor City Cruise
- 2024: Detroit Pistons
- 2024: →Motor City Cruise
- 2024–2026: Oklahoma City Blue
- 2025: NBA G League United
- 2026: Oklahoma City Thunder
- 2026–present: Oklahoma City Blue

Career highlights
- First-team All-ACC (2022)
- Stats at NBA.com
- Stats at Basketball Reference

Jackson Thomas "Buddy" Boeheim (born November 11, 1999) is an American professional basketball player for the Oklahoma City Blue of the NBA G League. The son of Hall of Fame basketball coach Jim Boeheim, he played college basketball for the Syracuse Orange.

== High school career ==
Boeheim attended Jamesville-DeWitt High School in DeWitt, New York. As a junior, he averaged 26.3 points and 9.8 rebounds per game, leading his team to a Class A Section III title, and was named All-Central New York Large School Player of the Year. For his senior season, Boeheim transferred to Brewster Academy in Wolfeboro, New Hampshire, where he served as team captain. He committed to playing college basketball at Syracuse, where his father was serving as head coach, over offers from Gonzaga and UMass.

== College career ==
Boeheim came off the bench in his freshman season at Syracuse, averaging 6.8 points per game. He entered the starting lineup as a sophomore and averaged 15.3 points. On March 11, 2021, Boeheim scored a career-high 31 points in a 72–69 loss to Virginia at the ACC tournament quarterfinals. In his next game, on March 19, he scored 30 points in a 78–62 first-round win over sixth-seeded San Diego State at the NCAA tournament. As a junior, Boeheim averaged 17.8 points and 2.6 assists per game, while shooting 38.3 percent from three-point range. He was named to the All-ACC First Team as a senior.

== Professional career ==
=== Detroit Pistons / Motor City Cruise (2022–2024) ===
After going undrafted in the 2022 NBA draft, Boeheim signed a two-way contract with the Detroit Pistons. Boeheim later joined the Pistons' 2022 NBA Summer League team. In his Summer League debut, Boeheim scored no points, going 0-for-2 from the field in around nine minutes in an 81–78 win against the Portland Trail Blazers. Four nights later he scored a team-high 18 points for the Pistons in a loss to the Indiana Pacers.

In July 2023, Boeheim joined the Pistons for the 2023 NBA Summer League and on October 2, he signed a standard contract with them. However, he was waived on October 21 and nine days later, he joined the Motor City Cruise.

On February 23, 2024, Boeheim signed a standard contract with Detroit. However, he was waived on June 29.

=== Oklahoma City Blue (2024–2026) ===
On October 16, 2024, Boeheim signed with the Oklahoma City Thunder, but was waived two days later. On October 25, he joined the Oklahoma City Blue.

Boeheim signed with the Thunder on October 14, 2025. He was waived the following day in order to join the Blue.

On February 7, 2026, Boeheim agreed to a two-way contract with the Thunder. This followed the waiving of Chris Youngblood. He made four appearances for Oklahoma City, averaging 1.5 points. On March 2, the Thunder waived Boeheim.

== Career statistics ==
Legend
| GP | Games played | GS | Games started | MPG | Minutes per game |
| FG% | Field goal percentage | 3P% | 3-point field goal percentage | FT% | Free throw percentage |
| RPG | Rebounds per game | APG | Assists per game | SPG | Steals per game |
| BPG | Blocks per game | PPG | Points per game | **Bold** | Career high |

=== NBA ===
| Year | Team | GP | GS | MPG | FG% | 3P% | FT% | RPG | APG | SPG | BPG | PPG |
|---|---|---|---|---|---|---|---|---|---|---|---|---|
| 2022–23 | Detroit | **10** | 0 | **9.0** | .185 | .160 | **1.000** | .6 | **.4** | **.2** | .0 | 1.6 |
| 2023–24 | Detroit | **10** | 0 | 8.4 | .310 | .320 | .800 | **1.0** | .3 | .0 | **.1** | **3.4** |
| 2025–26 | Oklahoma City | 4 | 0 | 3.8 | **.333** | **.333** | — | .0 | .0 | .0 | .0 | 1.5 |
| Career | | 24 | 0 | 7.9 | .258 | .250 | .833 | .7 | .3 | .1 | .0 | 2.3 |

=== College ===
| Year | Team | GP | GS | MPG | FG% | 3P% | FT% | RPG | APG | SPG | BPG | PPG |
|---|---|---|---|---|---|---|---|---|---|---|---|---|
| 2018–19 | Syracuse | **32** | 5 | 17.1 | .381 | .353 | .788 | 1.6 | 1.0 | .6 | .1 | 6.8 |
| 2019–20 | Syracuse | **32** | **32** | 35.6 | .407 | .370 | .714 | 1.9 | 2.2 | 1.1 | **.2** | 15.3 |
| 2020–21 | Syracuse | 25 | 25 | 36.2 | **.433** | **.383** | .849 | 2.6 | 2.6 | 1.3 | .0 | 17.8 |
| 2021–22 | Syracuse | **32** | **32** | **38.0** | .406 | .341 | **.884** | **3.4** | **3.1** | **1.5** | .1 | **19.2** |
| Career | | 121 | 94 | 31.5 | .410 | .362 | .827 | 2.4 | 2.2 | 1.1 | .1 | 14.6 |

== Personal life ==
His father is Hall-of-Fame basketball coach Jim Boeheim, whom he played for at Syracuse. Two of his siblings play college basketball: his older brother, Jimmy, who played with him at Syracuse, and his twin sister, Jamie, at Rochester.
