= 2022–23 Boston Celtics season =

2022–23 NBA season by team

- Division champions
- Head coach: Joe Mazzulla (interim from September 22, 2022; permanent from February 16, 2023)
- General manager: Brad Stevens
- Owner: Wyc Grousbeck
- Arena: TD Garden

Results
- Record: 57–25 (.695)
- Place: Division: 1st (Atlantic); Conference: 2nd (Eastern)
- Playoff finish: Conference finals (lost to Heat 3–4)
- Stats at Basketball Reference

Local media
- Television: NBC Sports Boston
- Radio: WBZ-FM

The 2022–23 Boston Celtics season was the franchise's 77th season in the National Basketball Association (NBA). The Celtics entered the season as the defending Eastern Conference and Atlantic Division champions, with hopes of claiming a record-breaking eighteenth NBA Championship, having lost to the Golden State Warriors in six games in the 2022 NBA Finals the season prior.

On September 22, 2022, head coach Ime Udoka was suspended until June 30, 2023, for a violation of the team's code of conduct, following a team investigation into an inappropriate relationship between himself and a female Celtics staff member. As a result, assistant coach Joe Mazzulla was named interim head coach. After a 42–17 start to the season, Mazzulla was named the permanent head coach and signed to a contract extension on February 16, 2023. By the end of the season, the Celtics had managed to improve on their previous season's record by six games, finishing with a 57–25 record and achieving their most regular season wins since 2009.

The Celtics qualified for the 2023 NBA playoffs as the #2-seed in the Eastern Conference, behind the Milwaukee Bucks. Despite entering the postseason as modest favorites for the championship, the team struggled all postseason, taking six and seven games to win their first two series against the Atlanta Hawks and the Philadelphia 76ers, respectively (this being only the first time since 2018 that the Celtics took longer than four games to win a first round series, not counting 2021, in which they had lost in the first round), and nearly blowing a 2–1 lead in the latter series. Regardless, the Celtics advanced to the Eastern Conference finals for the fifth time in seven seasons. In this round, Boston faced their rivals the Miami Heat for the third time in four years, and quickly found themselves in trouble, going 0–3 down in the series, a position from which no team had ever advanced before. However, the Celtics remained resilient and became only the fourth team in NBA history, and first since the 2002–03 Portland Trail Blazers, to force a Game 7 from such a position when Derrick White made a dramatic buzzer-beating putback layup at the end of Game 6, the first buzzer-beater made by a team trailing and facing elimination since Michael Jordan's famous 1989 shot against the Cleveland Cavaliers. Despite hopes of becoming the first NBA team to overcome a 0–3 series deficit, Boston failed to make history in Game 7, collapsing in a 103–84 home loss, during which Jayson Tatum injured his ankle in the first minute of the game and ending their season just one win short of a return to the NBA Finals.

== Draft ==
Round	Pick	Player	Position	Nationality	College
2	53	JD Davison	PG	United States	Alabama

The Celtics owed their first-round pick (25th overall) to the San Antonio Spurs. The Celtics only owned their second-round pick.

== Roster ==
2022–23 Boston Celtics roster
Players

Pos.	No.	Player	Height	Weight	DOB	From
G	13	Malcolm Brogdon	6 ft 4 in (1.93 m)	229 lb (104 kg)	1992-12-11	Virginia
G/F	7	Jaylen Brown	6 ft 7 in (2.01 m)	223 lb (101 kg)	1996-10-24	California
G/F	99	Justin Champagnie	6 ft 6 in (1.98 m)	206 lb (93 kg)	2001-06-29	Pittsburgh
G	20	JD Davison (TW)	6 ft 1 in (1.85 m)	195 lb (88 kg)	2002-10-03	Alabama
F	8	Danilo Gallinari	6 ft 10 in (2.08 m)	236 lb (107 kg)	1988-08-08	Italy
F	91	Blake Griffin	6 ft 9 in (2.06 m)	250 lb (113 kg)	1989-03-16	Oklahoma
F	30	Sam Hauser	6 ft 7 in (2.01 m)	217 lb (98 kg)	1997-12-08	Virginia
F/C	42	Al Horford	6 ft 9 in (2.06 m)	240 lb (109 kg)	1986-06-03	Florida
C	28	Mfiondu Kabengele (TW)	6 ft 10 in (2.08 m)	250 lb (113 kg)	1997-08-14	Florida State
F/C	40	Luke Kornet	7 ft 2 in (2.18 m)	250 lb (113 kg)	1995-07-15	Vanderbilt
F	57	Mike Muscala	6 ft 11 in (2.11 m)	240 lb (109 kg)	1991-07-01	Bucknell
G	11	Payton Pritchard	6 ft 1 in (1.85 m)	195 lb (88 kg)	1998-01-28	Oregon
G	36	Marcus Smart	6 ft 4 in (1.93 m)	220 lb (100 kg)	1994-03-06	Oklahoma State
G/F	0	Jayson Tatum	6 ft 8 in (2.03 m)	210 lb (95 kg)	1998-03-03	Duke
G	9	Derrick White	6 ft 4 in (1.93 m)	190 lb (86 kg)	1994-07-02	Colorado
F	12	Grant Williams	6 ft 6 in (1.98 m)	236 lb (107 kg)	1998-11-30	Tennessee
C	44	Robert, III Williams	6 ft 9 in (2.06 m)	237 lb (108 kg)	1997-10-17	Texas A&M

Coaches
Head coach
- Joe Mazzulla
Assistant(s)
- Tony Dobbins
- DJ MacLeay
- Aaron Miles
- Matt Reynolds
- Ben Sullivan

Legend
- (DP) Unsigned draft pick
- (FA) Free agent
- (S) Suspended
- (GL) On assignment to G League affiliate
- (TW) Two-way affiliate player
- Injured

Roster
Updated: April 7, 2023

== Standings ==
=== Division ===
Atlantic Division	W	L	PCT	GB	Home	Road	Div	GP
y – Boston Celtics	57	25	.695	–	32‍–‍9	25‍–‍16	11–5	82
x – Philadelphia 76ers	54	28	.659	3.0	29‍–‍12	25‍–‍16	10–6	82
x – New York Knicks	47	35	.573	10.0	23‍–‍18	24‍–‍17	8–8	82
x – Brooklyn Nets	45	37	.549	12.0	23‍–‍18	22‍–‍19	7–9	82
pi – Toronto Raptors	41	41	.500	16.0	27‍–‍14	14‍–‍27	4–12	82

=== Conference ===
Eastern Conference
#	Team	W	L	PCT	GB	GP
1	z – Milwaukee Bucks *	58	24	.707	–	82
2	y – Boston Celtics *	57	25	.695	1.0	82
3	x – Philadelphia 76ers	54	28	.659	4.0	82
4	x – Cleveland Cavaliers	51	31	.622	7.0	82
5	x – New York Knicks	47	35	.573	11.0	82
6	x – Brooklyn Nets	45	37	.549	13.0	82
7	y – Miami Heat *	44	38	.537	14.0	82
8	x – Atlanta Hawks	41	41	.500	17.0	82
9	pi – Toronto Raptors	41	41	.500	17.0	82
10	pi – Chicago Bulls	40	42	.488	18.0	82
11	Indiana Pacers	35	47	.427	23.0	82
12	Washington Wizards	35	47	.427	23.0	82
13	Orlando Magic	34	48	.415	24.0	82
14	Charlotte Hornets	27	55	.329	31.0	82
15	Detroit Pistons	17	65	.207	41.0	82

== Game log ==
=== Preseason ===
2022 preseason game log
Total: 2–2 (home: 1–1; road: 1–1)
Preseason: 2–2 (home: 1–1; road: 1–1)

Game	Date	Team	Score	High points	High rebounds	High assists	Location Attendance	Record
1	October 2	Charlotte	W 134–93	Jaylen Brown (24)	Noah Vonleh (9)	Malcolm Brogdon (9)	TD Garden; 19,156	1–0
2	October 5	Toronto	L 119–125 (OT)	Jaylen Brown (23)	Jayson Tatum (10)	Malcolm Brogdon (9)	TD Garden; 19,156	1–1
3	October 7	@ Charlotte	W 112–103	Jaylen Brown (19)	Noah Vonleh (13)	Payton Pritchard (7)	Greensboro Coliseum; 16,119	2–1
4	October 14	@ Toronto	L 134–137 (OT)	Brown, White (23)	Jayson Tatum (9)	Jayson Tatum (5)	Bell Centre; 21,900	2–2

2022–23 preseason schedule

=== Regular season ===
2022–23 game log
Total: 57–25 (home: 32–9; road: 25–16)
October: 4–2 (home: 2–1; road: 2–1)

Game	Date	Team	Score	High points	High rebounds	High assists	Location Attendance	Record
1	October 18	Philadelphia	W 126–117	Brown, Tatum (35)	Jayson Tatum (12)	Marcus Smart (7)	TD Garden; 19,156	1–0
2	October 21	@ Miami	W 111–104	Jayson Tatum (29)	White, G. Williams (7)	Jayson Tatum (4)	FTX Arena; 19,600	2–0
3	October 22	@ Orlando	W 126–120	Jayson Tatum (40)	Jaylen Brown (9)	Marcus Smart (8)	Amway Center; 19,299	3–0
4	October 24	@ Chicago	L 102–120	Jayson Tatum (26)	Jayson Tatum (8)	Marcus Smart (6)	United Center; 17,673	3–1
5	October 28	Cleveland	L 123–132 (OT)	Brown, Tatum (32)	Jaylen Brown (8)	Marcus Smart (7)	TD Garden; 19,156	3–2
6	October 30	Washington	W 112–94	Jaylen Brown (24)	Jaylen Brown (10)	Marcus Smart (6)	TD Garden; 19,156	4–2

November: 14–2 (home: 9–0; road: 5–2)

Game	Date	Team	Score	High points	High rebounds	High assists	Location Attendance	Record
7	November 2	@ Cleveland	L 113–114 (OT)	Jaylen Brown (30)	Tatum, Horford (12)	Tatum, White (6)	Rocket Mortgage FieldHouse; 19,432	4–3
8	November 4	Chicago	W 123–119	Jayson Tatum (36)	Jayson Tatum (12)	Jayson Tatum (6)	TD Garden; 19,156	5–3
9	November 5	@ New York	W 133–118	Jaylen Brown (30)	Noah Vonleh (7)	Marcus Smart (11)	Madison Square Garden; 19,812	6–3
10	November 7	@ Memphis	W 109–106	Jayson Tatum (39)	Malcolm Brogdon (10)	Marcus Smart (11)	FedExForum; 17,371	7–3
11	November 9	Detroit	W 128–112	Jayson Tatum (31)	Derrick White (8)	Marcus Smart (11)	TD Garden; 19,156	8–3
12	November 11	Denver	W 131–112	Jayson Tatum (34)	Brown, Tatum (8)	Jaylen Brown (8)	TD Garden; 19,156	9–3
13	November 12	@ Detroit	W 117–108	Jayson Tatum (43)	Tatum, G. Williams (10)	Marcus Smart (10)	Little Caesars Arena; 20,190	10–3
14	November 14	Oklahoma City	W 126–122	Jayson Tatum (27)	Al Horford (11)	Marcus Smart (8)	TD Garden; 19,156	11–3
15	November 16	@ Atlanta	W 126–101	Jaylen Brown (22)	Al Horford (11)	Derrick White (10)	State Farm Arena; 18,165	12–3
16	November 18	@ New Orleans	W 117–109	Jaylen Brown (27)	Jaylen Brown (10)	Jayson Tatum (10)	Smoothie King Center; 17,828	13–3
17	November 21	@ Chicago	L 107–121	Jayson Tatum (28)	Jayson Tatum (11)	Marcus Smart (8)	United Center; 20,786	13–4
18	November 23	Dallas	W 125–112	Jayson Tatum (37)	Jayson Tatum (13)	Marcus Smart (9)	TD Garden; 19,156	14–4
19	November 25	Sacramento	W 122–104	Jayson Tatum (30)	Jayson Tatum (8)	Horford, Smart (5)	TD Garden; 19,156	15–4
20	November 27	Washington	W 130–121	Jaylen Brown (36)	Grant Williams (7)	Marcus Smart (7)	TD Garden; 19,156	16–4
21	November 28	Charlotte	W 140–105	Jayson Tatum (35)	Luke Kornet (8)	Marcus Smart (15)	TD Garden; 19,156	17–4
22	November 30	Miami	W 134–121	Jayson Tatum (49)	Jayson Tatum (11)	Marcus Smart (9)	TD Garden; 19,156	18–4

December: 8–6 (home: 4–4; road: 4–2)

Game	Date	Team	Score	High points	High rebounds	High assists	Location Attendance	Record
23	December 2	Miami	L 116–120 (OT)	Jaylen Brown (37)	Jaylen Brown (14)	Marcus Smart (9)	TD Garden; 19,156	18–5
24	December 4	@ Brooklyn	W 103–92	Jaylen Brown (34)	Jayson Tatum (11)	Malcolm Brogdon (8)	Barclays Center; 18,043	19–5
25	December 5	@ Toronto	W 116–110	Jayson Tatum (31)	Jayson Tatum (12)	Jaylen Brown (8)	Scotiabank Arena; 19,800	20–5
26	December 7	@ Phoenix	W 125–98	Brown, Tatum (25)	Blake Griffin (9)	Smart, White (6)	Footprint Center; 17,071	21–5
27	December 10	@ Golden State	L 107–123	Jaylen Brown (31)	Jaylen Brown (9)	Marcus Smart (5)	Chase Center; 18,064	21–6
28	December 12	@ L.A. Clippers	L 93–113	Jaylen Brown (21)	Jayson Tatum (11)	Malcolm Brogdon (6)	Crypto.com Arena; 19,068	21–7
29	December 13	@ L.A. Lakers	W 122–118 (OT)	Jayson Tatum (44)	Jaylen Brown (15)	Brogdon, Smart, Tatum (6)	Crypto.com Arena; 18,661	22–7
30	December 16	Orlando	L 109–117	Jayson Tatum (31)	Jayson Tatum (7)	Marcus Smart (8)	TD Garden; 19,156	22–8
31	December 18	Orlando	L 92–95	Jaylen Brown (24)	Jaylen Brown (14)	Marcus Smart (7)	TD Garden; 19,156	22–9
32	December 21	Indiana	L 112–117	Jayson Tatum (41)	Robert Williams III (12)	Malcolm Brogdon (7)	TD Garden; 19,156	22–10
33	December 23	Minnesota	W 121–109	Jaylen Brown (36)	Al Horford (11)	Marcus Smart (10)	TD Garden; 19,156	23–10
34	December 25	Milwaukee	W 139–118	Jayson Tatum (41)	Jayson Tatum (7)	Marcus Smart (8)	TD Garden; 19,156	24–10
35	December 27	Houston	W 126–102	Jaylen Brown (39)	Robert Williams III (15)	Malcolm Brogdon (8)	TD Garden; 19,156	25–10
36	December 29	L.A. Clippers	W 116–110	Brown, Tatum (29)	Jayson Tatum (11)	Marcus Smart (9)	TD Garden; 19,156	26–10

January: 10–5 (home: 4–1; road: 6–4)

Game	Date	Team	Score	High points	High rebounds	High assists	Location Attendance	Record
37	January 1	@ Denver	L 111–123	Jaylen Brown (30)	Jaylen Brown (8)	Marcus Smart (7)	Ball Arena; 19,641	26–11
38	January 3	@ Oklahoma City	L 117–150	Jaylen Brown (29)	Malcolm Brogdon (9)	Marcus Smart (8)	Paycom Center; 16,778	26–12
39	January 5	@ Dallas	W 124–95	Jayson Tatum (29)	Jayson Tatum (14)	Jayson Tatum (10)	American Airlines Center; 20,413	27–12
40	January 7	@ San Antonio	W 121–116	Jayson Tatum (34)	Robert Williams III (11)	Derrick White (11)	AT&T Center; 18,354	28–12
41	January 9	Chicago	W 107–99	Jayson Tatum (32)	Tatum, G. Williams (8)	Jayson Tatum (7)	TD Garden; 19,156	29–12
42	January 11	New Orleans	W 125–114	Jaylen Brown (41)	Jaylen Brown (12)	Derrick White (6)	TD Garden; 19,156	30–12
43	January 12	@ Brooklyn	W 109–98	Jayson Tatum (20)	Jayson Tatum (11)	Marcus Smart (10)	Barclays Center; 18,125	31–12
44	January 14	@ Charlotte	W 122–106	Jayson Tatum (33)	Robert Williams III (12)	Marcus Smart (12)	Spectrum Center; 19,608	32–12
45	January 16	@ Charlotte	W 130–118	Jayson Tatum (51)	Tatum, G. Williams, R. Williams (9)	Derrick White (8)	Spectrum Center; 19,227	33–12
46	January 19	Golden State	W 121–118 (OT)	Jayson Tatum (34)	Jayson Tatum (19)	Jayson Tatum (6)	TD Garden; 19,156	34–12
47	January 21	@ Toronto	W 106–104	Jaylen Brown (27)	Jaylen Brown (8)	Jaylen Brown (6)	Scotiabank Arena; 19,800	35–12
48	January 23	@ Orlando	L 98–113	Brown, Tatum (26)	Jayson Tatum (6)	Jayson Tatum (7)	Amway Center; 19,196	35–13
49	January 24	@ Miami	L 95–98	Jayson Tatum (31)	Jayson Tatum (14)	Jayson Tatum (7)	Miami-Dade Arena; 19,705	35–14
50	January 26	New York	L 117–120 (OT)	Jayson Tatum (35)	Jayson Tatum (14)	Malcolm Brogdon (6)	TD Garden; 19,156	35–15
51	January 28	L.A. Lakers	W 125–121 (OT)	Jaylen Brown (37)	Jayson Tatum (11)	Brogdon, Tatum (4)	TD Garden; 19,156	36–15

February: 8–3 (home: 5–1; road: 3–2)

Game	Date	Team	Score	High points	High rebounds	High assists	Location Attendance	Record
52	February 1	Brooklyn	W 139–96	Jayson Tatum (31)	Derrick White (10)	Derrick White (5)	TD Garden; 19,156	37–15
53	February 3	Phoenix	L 94–106	Jaylen Brown (27)	Al Horford (9)	Jayson Tatum (5)	TD Garden; 19,156	37–16
54	February 6	@ Detroit	W 111–99	Jayson Tatum (34)	Robert Williams III (15)	Derrick White (7)	Little Caesars Arena; 17,933	38–16
55	February 8	Philadelphia	W 106–99	Brogdon, White (19)	Hauser, Tatum, G. Williams (8)	Jayson Tatum (9)	TD Garden; 19,156	39–16
56	February 10	Charlotte	W 127–116	Jayson Tatum (41)	Robert Williams III (16)	Derrick White (10)	TD Garden; 19,156	40–16
57	February 12	Memphis	W 119–109	Derrick White (23)	Robert Williams III (16)	Derrick White (10)	TD Garden; 19,156	41–16
58	February 14	@ Milwaukee	L 125–131 (OT)	Derrick White (27)	Grant Williams (10)	Derrick White (12)	Fiserv Forum; 17,623	41–17
59	February 15	Detroit	W 127–109	Jayson Tatum (38)	Jayson Tatum (9)	Jayson Tatum (7)	TD Garden; 19,156	42–17
All-Star Break
60	February 23	@ Indiana	W 142–138 (OT)	Jayson Tatum (31)	Jayson Tatum (12)	Brogdon, Tatum (7)	Gainbridge Fieldhouse; 16,125	43–17
61	February 25	@ Philadelphia	W 110–107	Jaylen Brown (26)	Jayson Tatum (13)	Jayson Tatum (6)	Wells Fargo Center; 20,993	44–17
62	February 27	@ New York	L 94–109	Malcolm Brogdon (22)	Tatum, R. Williams (7)	Jayson Tatum (9)	Madison Square Garden; 19,812	44–18

March: 10–6 (home: 5–2; road: 5–4)

Game	Date	Team	Score	High points	High rebounds	High assists	Location Attendance	Record
63	March 1	Cleveland	W 117–113	Jayson Tatum (41)	Horford, Tatum, R. Williams (11)	Jayson Tatum (8)	TD Garden; 19,156	45–18
64	March 3	Brooklyn	L 105–115	Jaylen Brown (35)	Jayson Tatum (13)	Marcus Smart (8)	TD Garden; 19,156	45–19
65	March 5	New York	L 129–131 (2OT)	Jayson Tatum (40)	Al Horford (14)	Horford, Tatum (6)	TD Garden; 19,156	45–20
66	March 6	@ Cleveland	L 114–118 (OT)	Jaylen Brown (32)	Jaylen Brown (13)	Jaylen Brown (9)	Rocket Mortgage FieldHouse; 19,432	45–21
67	March 8	Portland	W 115–93	Jayson Tatum (30)	Malcolm Brogdon (9)	Derrick White (7)	TD Garden; 19,156	46–21
68	March 11	@ Atlanta	W 134–125	Jayson Tatum (34)	Jayson Tatum (15)	Brown, White (7)	State Farm Arena; 17,884	47–21
69	March 13	@ Houston	L 109–111	Jaylen Brown (43)	Jayson Tatum (8)	Jayson Tatum (6)	Toyota Center; 18,055	47–22
70	March 15	@ Minnesota	W 104–102	Jaylen Brown (35)	Jayson Tatum (12)	Horford, Smart (5)	Target Center; 17,136	48–22
71	March 17	@ Portland	W 126–112	Jayson Tatum (34)	Jayson Tatum (12)	Al Horford (10)	Moda Center; 19,393	49–22
72	March 18	@ Utah	L 117–118	Jaylen Brown (25)	Luke Kornet (7)	Brown, Tatum (6)	Vivint Arena; 18,206	49–23
73	March 21	@ Sacramento	W 132–109	Jayson Tatum (36)	Jayson Tatum (8)	Derrick White (12)	Golden 1 Center; 18,111	50–23
74	March 24	Indiana	W 120–95	Jayson Tatum (34)	Al Horford (9)	Derrick White (9)	TD Garden; 19,156	51–23
75	March 26	San Antonio	W 137–93	Jaylen Brown (41)	Jaylen Brown (13)	Malcolm Brogdon (9)	TD Garden; 19,156	52–23
76	March 28	@ Washington	L 111–130	Jayson Tatum (28)	Jayson Tatum (9)	Smart, Tatum (5)	Capital One Arena; 20,476	52–24
77	March 30	@ Milwaukee	W 140–99	Jayson Tatum (40)	Jayson Tatum (8)	Marcus Smart (8)	Fiserv Forum; 18,073	53–24
78	March 31	Utah	W 122–114	Jayson Tatum (39)	Blake Griffin (12)	Malcolm Brogdon (7)	TD Garden; 19,156	54–24

April : 3–1 (home: 3–0; road: 0–1)

Game	Date	Team	Score	High points	High rebounds	High assists	Location Attendance	Record
79	April 4	@ Philadelphia	L 101–103	Derrick White (26)	Al Horford (8)	Horford, Tatum (6)	Wells Fargo Center; 21,104	54–25
80	April 5	Toronto	W 97–93	Malcolm Brogdon (29)	Jaylen Brown (11)	Jaylen Brown (5)	TD Garden; 19,156	55–25
81	April 7	Toronto	W 121–102	Sam Hauser (26)	Robert Williams III (9)	Derrick White (10)	TD Garden; 19,156	56–25
82	April 9	Atlanta	W 120–114	Payton Pritchard (30)	Payton Pritchard (14)	Payton Pritchard (11)	TD Garden; 19,156	57–25

2022–23 season schedule

=== Playoffs ===
2023 playoff game log
Total: 11–9 (home: 5–6; road: 6–3)
First Round: 4–2 (home: 2–1; road: 2–1)

Game	Date	Team	Score	High points	High rebounds	High assists	Location Attendance	Series
1	April 15	Atlanta	W 112–99	Jaylen Brown (29)	Jaylen Brown (12)	Smart, White (7)	TD Garden; 19,156	1–0
2	April 18	Atlanta	W 119–106	Jayson Tatum (29)	Jayson Tatum (10)	Malcolm Brogdon (8)	TD Garden; 19,156	2–0
3	April 21	@ Atlanta	L 122–130	Jayson Tatum (29)	Jayson Tatum (10)	Marcus Smart (8)	State Farm Arena; 18,536	2–1
4	April 23	@ Atlanta	W 129–121	Brown, Tatum (31)	Robert Williams III (15)	Al Horford (5)	State Farm Arena; 19,144	3–1
5	April 25	Atlanta	L 117–119	Jaylen Brown (35)	Jayson Tatum (8)	Jayson Tatum (8)	TD Garden; 19,156	3–2
6	April 27	@ Atlanta	W 128–120	Jaylen Brown (32)	Jayson Tatum (14)	Jayson Tatum (7)	State Farm Arena; 19,176	4–2

Conference Semifinals: 4–3 (home: 2–2; road: 2–1)

Game	Date	Team	Score	High points	High rebounds	High assists	Location Attendance	Series
1	May 1	Philadelphia	L 115–119	Jayson Tatum (39)	Jayson Tatum (11)	Marcus Smart (7)	TD Garden; 19,156	0–1
2	May 3	Philadelphia	W 121–87	Jaylen Brown (25)	Horford, Tatum, R. Williams (7)	Brown, G. Williams, R. Williams (4)	TD Garden; 19,156	1–1
3	May 5	@ Philadelphia	W 114–102	Jayson Tatum (27)	Jayson Tatum (10)	Malcolm Brogdon (6)	Wells Fargo Center; 21,290	2–1
4	May 7	@ Philadelphia	L 115–116 (OT)	Jayson Tatum (24)	Jayson Tatum (18)	Marcus Smart (7)	Wells Fargo Center; 21,264	2–2
5	May 9	Philadelphia	L 103–115	Jayson Tatum (36)	Jayson Tatum (10)	Jayson Tatum (5)	TD Garden; 19,156	2–3
6	May 11	@ Philadelphia	W 95–86	Marcus Smart (22)	Al Horford (11)	Marcus Smart (7)	Wells Fargo Center; 21,337	3–3
7	May 14	Philadelphia	W 112–88	Jayson Tatum (51)	Jayson Tatum (13)	Jayson Tatum (5)	TD Garden; 19,156	4–3

Conference Finals: 3–4 (home: 1–3; road: 2–1)

Game	Date	Team	Score	High points	High rebounds	High assists	Location Attendance	Series
1	May 17	Miami	L 116–123	Jayson Tatum (30)	Jaylen Brown (9)	Marcus Smart (11)	TD Garden; 19,156	0–1
2	May 19	Miami	L 105–111	Jayson Tatum (34)	Jayson Tatum (13)	Jayson Tatum (8)	TD Garden; 19,156	0–2
3	May 21	@ Miami	L 102–128	Jayson Tatum (14)	Jayson Tatum (10)	Marcus Smart (8)	Kaseya Center; 20,088	0–3
4	May 23	@ Miami	W 116–99	Jayson Tatum (33)	Jayson Tatum (11)	Jayson Tatum (7)	Kaseya Center; 20,147	1–3
5	May 25	Miami	W 110–97	Derrick White (24)	Al Horford (11)	Jayson Tatum (11)	TD Garden; 19,156	2–3
6	May 27	@ Miami	W 104–103	Jayson Tatum (31)	Jayson Tatum (12)	Derrick White (6)	Kaseya Center; 20,201	3–3
7	May 29	Miami	L 84–103	Jaylen Brown (19)	Jayson Tatum (11)	Jaylen Brown (5)	TD Garden; 19,156	3–4

2023 playoff schedule

== Player statistics ==
Legend
GP	Games played	GS	Games started	MPG	Minutes per game
FG%	Field-goal percentage	3P%	3-point field-goal percentage	FT%	Free-throw percentage
RPG	Rebounds per game	APG	Assists per game	SPG	Steals per game
BPG	Blocks per game	PPG	Points per game

=== Regular season ===
Boston Celtics statistics
Player	GP	GS	MPG	FG%	3P%	FT%	RPG	APG	SPG	BPG	PPG
Derrick White	82	70	28.3	.462	.381	.875	3.6	3.9	.7	.9	12.4
Sam Hauser	80	8	16.1	.455	.418	.706	2.6	.9	.4	.3	6.4
Grant Williams	79	23	25.9	.454	.395	.770	4.6	1.7	.5	.4	8.1
Jayson Tatum	74	74	36.9	.466	.350	.854	8.8	4.6	1.1	.7	30.1
Luke Kornet	69	0	11.7	.665	.231	.821	2.9	.8	.2	.7	3.8
Jaylen Brown	67	67	35.9	.491	.335	.765	6.9	3.5	1.1	.4	26.6
Malcolm Brogdon	67	0	26.0	.484	.444	.870	4.2	3.7	.7	.3	14.9
Al Horford	63	63	30.5	.476	.446	.714	6.2	3.0	.5	1.0	9.8
Marcus Smart	61	61	32.1	.415	.336	.746	3.1	6.3	1.5	.4	11.5
Payton Pritchard	48	3	13.4	.412	.364	.750	1.8	1.3	.3	.0	5.6
Blake Griffin	41	16	13.9	.485	.348	.656	3.8	1.5	.3	.2	4.1
Robert Williams III	35	20	23.5	.747	.000	.610	8.3	1.4	.6	1.4	8.0
Noah Vonleh	23	1	7.4	.458	.250	1.000	2.1	.3	.1	.3	1.1
Justin Jackson	23	0	4.7	.259	.250	.500	.7	.4	.2	.2	.9
Mike Muscala^{†}	20	4	16.2	.472	.385	.692	3.4	.6	.2	.3	5.9
JD Davison	12	0	5.5	.421	.286	.500	.8	.9	.2	.2	1.6
Mfiondu Kabengele	4	0	9.0	.286	.000	1.000	2.5	.0	.5	.0	1.5
Justin Champagnie^{†}	2	0	11.5	.167	.200		2.0	1.5	.5	.0	2.5

=== Playoffs ===
Boston Celtics statistics
Player	GP	GS	MPG	FG%	3P%	FT%	RPG	APG	SPG	BPG	PPG
Jayson Tatum	20	20	40.0	.458	.323	.876	10.5	5.3	1.1	1.1	27.2
Jaylen Brown	20	20	37.6	.496	.354	.689	5.6	3.4	1.1	.4	22.7
Marcus Smart	20	20	34.0	.453	.361	.800	4.0	5.1	1.3	.3	14.9
Al Horford	20	20	30.9	.386	.298	.750	7.2	3.0	1.1	1.7	6.7
Derrick White	20	16	29.7	.505	.455	.912	3.0	2.1	.6	1.0	13.4
Robert Williams III	20	4	20.9	.788	.000	.679	6.0	1.0	.5	1.3	7.7
Malcolm Brogdon	19	0	24.9	.418	.379	.829	3.5	2.9	.2	.3	11.9
Grant Williams	15	0	17.7	.472	.450	.800	2.2	1.2	.3	.4	5.1
Sam Hauser	15	0	6.9	.345	.333	1.000	1.1	.3	.1	.1	2.0
Payton Pritchard	10	0	5.7	.545	.400	.800	.6	1.1	.1	.0	3.2
Luke Kornet	8	0	4.0	.875	1.000	1.000	1.3	.0	.0	.1	2.1
Mike Muscala	6	0	3.5	.500	.500	.750	.7	.2	.0	.0	1.5
Justin Champagnie	4	0	2.5	.250	.000		.0	.0	.0	.0	.5
Blake Griffin	1	0	6.0	.000			2.0	.0	.0	.0	.0

- ^{†} Denotes player spent time with another team in the season. Stats reflect time with the Celtics only.

== Transactions ==
=== Trades ===
July 9, 2022	To Boston Celtics Malcolm Brogdon	To Indiana Pacers Malik Fitts; Juwan Morgan; Aaron Nesmith; Nik Stauskas; Daniel Theis; 2023 BOS protected first-round pick

January 5, 2023	To Boston Celtics 2024 SAS protected second-round pick	To San Antonio Spurs Noah Vonleh; Cash Considerations

February 9, 2023	To Boston Celtics Mike Muscala	To Oklahoma City Thunder Justin Jackson; 2023 second-round pick 2029 BOS protected second-round pick

=== Free agency ===
==== Re-signed ====
Player	Signed
Sam Hauser	July 9
Luke Kornet	July 9

==== Additions ====
Player	Signed	Former Team
Danilo Gallinari	July 12	San Antonio Spurs
Mfiondu Kabengele	July 16	Rio Grande Valley Vipers
Blake Griffin	October 3	Brooklyn Nets

==== Subtractions ====
Player	Reason	New Team
Noah Vonleh	Traded	
Justin Jackson	Traded	
