= 2022–23 Detroit Pistons season =

- Head coach: Dwane Casey
- General manager: Troy Weaver
- Owner: Tom Gores
- Arena: Little Caesars Arena

Results
- Record: 17–65 (.207)
- Place: Division: 5th (Central); Conference: 15th (Eastern)
- Playoff finish: Did not qualify
- Stats at Basketball Reference

Local media
- Television: Bally Sports Detroit
- Radio: WXYT

The 2022–23 Detroit Pistons season was the 82nd season of the franchise, the 75th in the National Basketball Association (NBA), and the sixth in Midtown Detroit. The Pistons finished with the worst overall record in the NBA and third-worst in franchise history at 17–65, missing the playoffs for the fourth consecutive season. It was their first 60 loss season since 1993–94. This was the fifth and final season under head coach Dwane Casey.

== Draft ==
Round	Pick	Player	Position	Nationality	College / Team
1	5	Jaden Ivey	Shooting guard	United States	Purdue
2	46	Ismaël Kamagate	Center	France	Paris Basketball

The Pistons held the fifth overall pick in the 2022 NBA draft, along with one second-round pick entering the draft.

On draft night, the Pistons traded for Jalen Duren, who was selected by the Charlotte Hornets with the 13th overall pick and subsequently traded to the New York Knicks. Additionally, the 46th pick was traded to the Portland Trail Blazers in exchange for the 36th pick.

== Roster ==
2022–23 Detroit Pistons roster
Players

Pos.	No.	Player	Height	Weight	DOB	From
F/C	35	Marvin III Bagley	6 ft 10 in (2.08 m)	235 lb (107 kg)	1999-03-14	Duke
G/F	27	Buddy Boeheim (TW)	6 ft 6 in (1.98 m)	205 lb (93 kg)	1999-11-11	Syracuse
F	44	Bojan Bogdanović (injured)	6 ft 7 in (2.01 m)	226 lb (103 kg)	1989-04-18	Croatia
G/F	5	Alec Burks (injured)	6 ft 6 in (1.98 m)	214 lb (97 kg)	1991-07-20	Colorado
G	2	Cade Cunningham	6 ft 6 in (1.98 m)	220 lb (100 kg)	2001-09-25	Oklahoma State
G	6	Hamidou Diallo	6 ft 5 in (1.96 m)	202 lb (92 kg)	1998-07-31	Kentucky
C	0	Jalen Duren	6 ft 10 in (2.08 m)	250 lb (113 kg)	2003-11-18	Memphis
G	14	R. J. Hampton	6 ft 4 in (1.93 m)	175 lb (79 kg)	1992-07-15	Little Elm HS (TX)
G	7	Killian Hayes	6 ft 5 in (1.96 m)	195 lb (88 kg)	2001-07-27	France
G	23	Jaden Ivey	6 ft 4 in (1.93 m)	195 lb (88 kg)	2002-02-13	Purdue
G	18	Cory Joseph	6 ft 3 in (1.91 m)	200 lb (91 kg)	1991-08-20	Texas
F	12	Isaiah Livers	6 ft 6 in (1.98 m)	232 lb (105 kg)	1998-07-28	Michigan
G	17	Rodney McGruder	6 ft 4 in (1.93 m)	205 lb (93 kg)	1991-07-29	Kansas State
F	97	Eugene Omoruyi	6 ft 6 in (1.98 m)	235 lb (107 kg)	1997-02-14	Oregon
G/F	42	Jared Rhoden (TW)	6 ft 6 in (1.98 m)	210 lb (95 kg)	1999-08-27	Seton Hall
F/C	28	Isaiah Stewart (injured)	6 ft 8 in (2.03 m)	250 lb (113 kg)	2001-05-22	Washington
C	13	James Wiseman	7 ft 0 in (2.13 m)	240 lb (109 kg)	2001-03-31	Memphis

Coaches
Head coach
- Dwane Casey
Assistant(s)
- Jerome Allen
- Bill Bayno
- Andrew Jones
- Rex Kalamian
- Jim Moran

Legend
- (DP) Unsigned draft pick
- (FA) Free agent
- (S) Suspended
- (GL) On assignment to G League affiliate
- (TW) Two-way affiliate player
- Injured

Roster
Updated: April 9, 2023

== Standings ==
=== Division ===
Central Division	W	L	PCT	GB	Home	Road	Div	GP
z – Milwaukee Bucks	58	24	.707	–	32‍–‍9	26‍–‍15	11–5	82
x – Cleveland Cavaliers	51	31	.622	7.0	31‍–‍10	20‍–‍21	13–3	82
pi – Chicago Bulls	40	42	.488	18.0	22‍–‍19	18‍–‍23	7–9	82
Indiana Pacers	35	47	.427	23.0	20‍–‍21	15‍–‍26	7–9	82
Detroit Pistons	17	65	.207	41.0	9‍–‍32	8‍–‍33	2–14	82

=== Conference ===
Eastern Conference
#	Team	W	L	PCT	GB	GP
1	z – Milwaukee Bucks *	58	24	.707	–	82
2	y – Boston Celtics *	57	25	.695	1.0	82
3	x – Philadelphia 76ers	54	28	.659	4.0	82
4	x – Cleveland Cavaliers	51	31	.622	7.0	82
5	x – New York Knicks	47	35	.573	11.0	82
6	x – Brooklyn Nets	45	37	.549	13.0	82
7	y – Miami Heat *	44	38	.537	14.0	82
8	x – Atlanta Hawks	41	41	.500	17.0	82
9	pi – Toronto Raptors	41	41	.500	17.0	82
10	pi – Chicago Bulls	40	42	.488	18.0	82
11	Indiana Pacers	35	47	.427	23.0	82
12	Washington Wizards	35	47	.427	23.0	82
13	Orlando Magic	34	48	.415	24.0	82
14	Charlotte Hornets	27	55	.329	31.0	82
15	Detroit Pistons	17	65	.207	41.0	82

== Game log ==
=== Preseason ===
2022 preseason game log
Total: 0–4 (Home: 0–2; Road: 0–2)
Preseason: 0–4 (home: 0–2; road: 0–2)

Game	Date	Team	Score	High points	High rebounds	High assists	Location Attendance	Record
1	October 4	@ New York	L 96–117	Jaden Ivey (16)	Jalen Duren (14)	Killian Hayes (5)	Madison Square Garden; 14,426	0–1
2	October 7	@ New Orleans	L 101–107	Saddiq Bey (23)	Bey, Stewart & Hayes (7)	Cade Cunningham (8)	Smoothie King Center; 13,309	0–2
3	October 11	Oklahoma City	L 99–115	Killian Hayes (20)	Jalen Duren (10)	Killian Hayes (7)	Little Caesars Arena; 8,723	0–3
4	October 13	Memphis	L 111–126	Saddiq Bey (17)	Jalen Duren (12)	Cory Joseph (7)	Little Caesars Arena; 12,104	0–4

2022–23 season schedule

=== Regular season ===
2022–23 game log
Total: 17–65 (Home: 9–32; Road: 8–33)
October: 2–6 (home: 2–2; road: 0–4)

Game	Date	Team	Score	High points	High rebounds	High assists	Location Attendance	Record
1	October 19	Orlando	W 113–109	Bojan Bogdanović (24)	Jalen Duren (10)	Cade Cunningham (10)	Little Caesars Arena; 20,190	1–0
2	October 21	@ New York	L 106–130	Saddiq Bey (26)	Stewart & Duren (10)	Jaden Ivey (9)	Madison Square Garden; 19,812	1–1
3	October 22	@ Indiana	L 115–124	Cade Cunningham (22)	Isaiah Stewart (16)	Bogdanović & Ivey (5)	Gainbridge Fieldhouse; 16,056	1–2
4	October 25	@ Washington	L 99–120	Bojan Bogdanović (25)	Isaiah Stewart (10)	Jaden Ivey (4)	Capital One Arena; 13,196	1–3
5	October 26	Atlanta	L 113–118	Bojan Bogdanović (33)	Stewart & Duren (9)	Cunningham & Joseph (6)	Little Caesars Arena; 17,987	1–4
6	October 28	Atlanta	L 112–136	Cade Cunningham (35)	Cade Cunningham (9)	Cade Cunningham (8)	Little Caesars Arena; 18,923	1–5
7	October 30	Golden State	W 128–114	Saddiq Bey (28)	Isaiah Stewart (13)	Cade Cunningham (9)	Little Caesars Arena; 20,190	2–5
8	October 31	@ Milwaukee	L 108–110	Cade Cunningham (27)	Isaiah Stewart (11)	Cade Cunningham (7)	Fiserv Forum; 17,341	2–6

November : 3–12 (home: 1–5; road: 2–7)

Game	Date	Team	Score	High points	High rebounds	High assists	Location Attendance	Record
9	November 2	@ Milwaukee	L 91–116	Saddiq Bey (22)	Isaiah Stewart (10)	Cory Joseph (6)	Fiserv Forum; 17,341	2–7
10	November 4	Cleveland	L 88–112	Cade Cunningham (19)	Ivey & Noel (6)	Cade Cunningham (5)	Little Caesars Arena; 18,744	2–8
11	November 7	Oklahoma City	W 112–103	Saddiq Bey (25)	Isaiah Stewart (12)	Cade Cunningham (7)	Little Caesars Arena; 16,223	3–8
12	November 9	@ Boston	L 112–128	Saddiq Bey (18)	Stewart, Ivey & Duren (10)	Jaden Ivey (6)	TD Garden; 19,156	3–9
13	November 11	@ New York	L 112–121	Bojan Bogdanović (25)	Stewart & Duren (8)	Killian Hayes (7)	Madison Square Garden; 19,812	3–10
14	November 12	Boston	L 108–117	Bojan Bogdanović (28)	Jalen Duren (12)	Killian Hayes (7)	Little Caesars Arena; 20,190	3–11
15	November 14	Toronto	L 111–115	Jaden Ivey (21)	Duren & Bey (6)	Jaden Ivey (8)	Little Caesars Arena; 16,988	3–12
16	November 17	@ L.A. Clippers	L 91–96	Bojan Bogdanović (26)	Jalen Duren (9)	Jaden Ivey (5)	Crypto.com Arena; 17,822	3–13
17	November 18	@ L.A. Lakers	L 121–128	Alec Burks (23)	Jalen Duren (8)	Killian Hayes (9)	Crypto.com Arena; 18,095	3–14
18	November 20	@ Sacramento	L 129–137	Jaden Ivey (24)	Jalen Duren (8)	Killian Hayes (6)	Golden 1 Center; 17,866	3–15
19	November 22	@ Denver	W 110–108	Bojan Bogdanović (22)	Bojan Bogdanović (9)	Killian Hayes (9)	Ball Arena; 19,635	4–15
20	November 23	@ Utah	W 125–116	Bojan Bogdanović (23)	Jalen Duren (7)	Ivey & Joseph (6)	Vivint Arena; 18,206	5–15
21	November 25	@ Phoenix	L 102–108	Bojan Bogdanović (19)	Marvin Bagley III (12)	Killian Hayes (9)	Footprint Center; 17,071	5–16
22	November 27	Cleveland	L 94–102	Marvin Bagley III (19)	Marvin Bagley III (10)	Killian Hayes (8)	Little Caesars Arena; 18,240	5–17
23	November 29	New York	L 110–140	Isaiah Stewart (19)	Marvin Bagley III (7)	Killian Hayes (6)	Little Caesars Arena; 14,864	5–18

December : 5–11 (home: 2–6; road: 3–5)

Game	Date	Team	Score	High points	High rebounds	High assists	Location Attendance	Record
24	December 1	Dallas	W 131–125 (OT)	Bojan Bogdanović (30)	Marvin Bagley III (13)	Killian Hayes (8)	Little Caesars Arena; 18,106	6–18
25	December 4	Memphis	L 112–122	Saddiq Bey (24)	Ivey & Bey (6)	Saddiq Bey (7)	Little Caesars Arena; 20,088	6–19
26	December 6	@ Miami	W 116–96	Bojan Bogdanović (31)	Isaiah Stewart (11)	Killian Hayes (6)	FTX Arena; 19,600	7–19
27	December 7	@ New Orleans	L 98–104	Saddiq Bey (25)	Jalen Duren (13)	Killian Hayes (11)	Smoothie King Center; 14,073	7–20
28	December 9	@ Memphis	L 103–114	Bojan Bogdanović (19)	Jalen Duren (12)	Hayes, Ivey & Joseph (5)	FedExForum; 17,103	7–21
29	December 11	L.A. Lakers	L 117–124	Bojan Bogdanović (38)	Jalen Duren (13)	Killian Hayes (9)	Little Caesars Arena; 20,190	7–22
30	December 14	@ Charlotte	W 141–134 (OT)	Alec Burks (27)	Jalen Duren (19)	Killian Hayes (8)	Spectrum Center; 14,303	8–22
31	December 16	Sacramento	L 113–122	Bojan Bogdanović (22)	Jalen Duren (14)	Ivey & Joseph (5)	Little Caesars Arena; 17,892	8–23
32	December 18	Brooklyn	L 121–124	Bojan Bogdanović (26)	Jalen Duren (11)	Killian Hayes (8)	Little Caesars Arena; 19,488	8–24
33	December 20	Utah	L 111–126	Jaden Ivey (30)	Jalen Duren (14)	Hayes & Ivey (5)	Little Caesars Arena; 15,622	8–25
34	December 21	@ Philadelphia	L 93–113	Jaden Ivey (18)	Marvin Bagley III (10)	Duren & Hayes (4)	Wells Fargo Center; 20,615	8–26
35	December 23	@ Atlanta	L 105–130	Bojan Bogdanović (23)	Jalen Duren (8)	Killian Hayes (5)	State Farm Arena; 17,028	8–27
36	December 26	L.A. Clippers	L 131–142 (OT)	Bojan Bogdanović (23)	Jalen Duren (12)	Killian Hayes (10)	Little Caesars Arena; 20,190	8–28
37	December 28	Orlando	W 121–101	Alec Burks (32)	Jalen Duren (18)	Bojan Bogdanović (5)	Little Caesars Arena; 20,190	9–28
38	December 30	@ Chicago	L 118–132	Jaden Ivey (22)	Isaiah Stewart (10)	Bogdanović & Ivey (6)	United Center; 21,667	9–29
39	December 31	@ Minnesota	W 116–104	Bojan Bogdanović (28)	Marvin Bagley III (10)	Bogdanović & Joseph (5)	Target Center; 16,233	10–29

January : 3–10 (home: 1–6; road: 2–4)

Game	Date	Team	Score	High points	High rebounds	High assists	Location Attendance	Record
40	January 2	@ Portland	L 106–135	Bojan Bogdanović (21)	Jalen Duren (11)	Bogdanović, Duren, Joseph & Burks (3)	Moda Center; 19,393	10–30
41	January 4	@ Golden State	W 122–119	Bojan Bogdanović (29)	Jalen Duren (11)	Killian Hayes (13)	Chase Center; 18,064	11–30
42	January 6	@ San Antonio	L 109–121	Bojan Bogdanović (21)	Jalen Duren (9)	Killian Hayes (7)	AT&T Center; 13,107	11–31
43	January 8	Philadelphia	L 111–123	Killian Hayes (26)	Isaiah Stewart (13)	Ivey & Hayes (6)	Little Caesars Arena; 18,898	11–32
44	January 10	@ Philadelphia	L 116–147	Bey, Ivey & McGruder (17)	Hamidou Diallo (8)	Cory Joseph (8)	Wells Fargo Center; 20,221	11–33
45	January 11	Minnesota	W 135–118	Saddiq Bey (31)	Bey & Bogdanović (6)	Killian Hayes (9)	Little Caesars Arena; 15,906	12–33
46	January 13	New Orleans	L 110–116	Bojan Bogdanović (22)	Saddiq Bey (10)	Ivey & Hayes (6)	Little Caesars Arena; 18,989	12–34
47	January 15	New York	L 104–117	Bey & Ivey (21)	Isaiah Stewart (9)	Killian Hayes (9)	Little Caesars Arena; 19,894	12–35
48	January 19	Chicago	L 108–126	Bojan Bogdanović (25)	Jalen Duren (12)	Killian Hayes (8)	(France) Accor Arena; 15,885	12–36
49	January 23	Milwaukee	L 130–150	Bojan Bogdanović (33)	Jalen Duren (15)	Jaden Ivey (11)	Little Caesars Arena; 18,011	12–37
50	January 26	@ Brooklyn	W 130–122	Saddiq Bey (25)	Saddiq Bey (9)	Jaden Ivey (8)	Barclays Center; 17,732	13–37
51	January 28	Houston	L 114–117	Alec Burks (21)	Jaden Ivey (7)	Killian Hayes (7)	Little Caesars Arena; 19,411	13–38
52	January 30	@ Dallas	L 105–111	Bojan Bogdanović (29)	Alec Burks (9)	Killian Hayes (7)	American Airlines Center; 19,777	13–39

February : 2–8 (home: 2–3; road: 0–5)

Game	Date	Team	Score	High points	High rebounds	High assists	Location Attendance	Record
—	February 1	Washington	Postponed due to ice storm (Rescheduled: March 7)					
53	February 3	Charlotte	W 118–112	Jaden Ivey (24)	Isaiah Stewart (16)	Jaden Ivey (7)	Little Caesars Arena; 18,007	14–39
54	February 4	Phoenix	L 100–116	Saddiq Bey (25)	Isaiah Stewart (9)	Jaden Ivey (6)	Little Caesars Arena; 19,788	14–40
55	February 6	Boston	L 99–111	Bojan Bogdanović (21)	Jalen Duren (14)	Killian Hayes (9)	Little Caesars Arena; 17,933	14–41
56	February 8	@ Cleveland	L 85–113	Bojan Bogdanović (15)	Jalen Duren (9)	Killian Hayes (6)	Rocket Mortgage FieldHouse; 19,432	14–42
57	February 10	San Antonio	W 138–131 (2OT)	Bojan Bogdanović (32)	Jalen Duren (17)	Jaden Ivey (8)	Little Caesars Arena; 17,899	15–42
58	February 12	@ Toronto	L 118–119	Bojan Bogdanović (33)	Hamidou Diallo (7)	Jaden Ivey (7)	Scotiabank Arena; 19,800	15–43
59	February 15	@ Boston	L 109–127	Bojan Bogdanović (28)	Jalen Duren (8)	Killian Hayes (9)	TD Garden; 19,156	15–44
All-Star Break
60	February 23	@ Orlando	L 106–108	Jaden Ivey (25)	James Wiseman (10)	Killian Hayes (5)	Amway Center; 18,846	15–45
61	February 25	Toronto	L 91–95	Marvin Bagley III (21)	Marvin Bagley III (18)	Jaden Ivey (10)	Little Caesars Arena; 20,190	15–46
62	February 27	@ Charlotte	L 106–117	Diallo & Wiseman (23)	Marvin Bagley III (12)	Killian Hayes (10)	Spectrum Center; 14,184	15–47

March : 1–14 (home: 1–8; road: 0–6)

Game	Date	Team	Score	High points	High rebounds	High assists	Location Attendance	Record
63	March 1	Chicago	L 115–117	Bojan Bogdanović (34)	Bagley III & Wiseman (9)	Killian Hayes (7)	Little Caesars Arena; 18,098	15–48
64	March 4	@ Cleveland	L 90–114	Marvin Bagley III (20)	Marvin Bagley III (13)	Killian Hayes (5)	Rocket Mortgage FieldHouse; 19,432	15–49
65	March 6	Portland	L 104–110	Isaiah Livers (17)	Bagley III & Diallo (8)	Jaden Ivey (13)	Little Caesars Arena; 16,989	15–50
66	March 7	Washington	L 117–119	Jaden Ivey (26)	Eugene Omoruyi (6)	Jaden Ivey (12)	Little Caesars Arena; 17,855	15–51
67	March 9	Charlotte	L 103–113	Cory Joseph (17)	James Wiseman (13)	Jaden Ivey (6)	Little Caesars Arena; 17,121	15–52
68	March 11	Indiana	L 115–121	Isaiah Livers (18)	Jalen Duren (11)	Killian Hayes (13)	Little Caesars Arena; 20,190	15–53
69	March 13	Indiana	W 117–97	Cory Joseph (22)	James Wiseman (14)	Killian Hayes (11)	Little Caesars Arena; 18,313	16–53
70	March 14	@ Washington	L 97–117	Killian Hayes (20)	James Wiseman (10)	Killian Hayes (7)	Capital One Arena; 15,279	16–54
71	March 16	Denver	L 100–119	Rodney McGruder (20)	Jalen Duren (13)	Killian Hayes (7)	Little Caesars Arena; 17,987	16–55
72	March 19	Miami	L 100–112	James Wiseman (22)	James Wiseman (13)	Killian Hayes (11)	Little Caesars Arena; 20,190	16–56
73	March 21	@ Atlanta	L 107–129	Marvin Bagley III (31)	Eugene Omoruyi (9)	Killian Hayes (6)	State Farm Arena; 17,129	16–57
74	March 24	@ Toronto	L 97–118	Jaden Ivey (20)	Marvin Bagley III (9)	Jaden Ivey (8)	Scotiabank Arena; 19,800	16–58
75	March 27	Milwaukee	L 117–126	Jaden Ivey (32)	Jalen Duren (10)	Jaden Ivey (8)	Little Caesars Arena; 21,090	16–59
76	March 29	@ Oklahoma City	L 106–107	Jaden Ivey (24)	James Wiseman (11)	Jaden Ivey (9)	Paycom Center; 15,047	16–60
77	March 31	@ Houston	L 115–121	Marvin Bagley III (21)	Jalen Duren (10)	Jaden Ivey (9)	Toyota Center; 15,844	16–61

April : 1–4 (home: 0–2; road: 1–2)

Game	Date	Team	Score	High points	High rebounds	High assists	Location Attendance	Record
78	April 2	@ Orlando	L 102–128	Killian Hayes (20)	James Wiseman (10)	Killian Hayes (7)	Amway Center; 19,431	16–62
79	April 4	Miami	L 105–118	Jaden Ivey (30)	Jalen Duren (14)	Killian Hayes (8)	Little Caesars Arena; 18,453	16–63
80	April 5	Brooklyn	L 108–123	R. J. Hampton (27)	Jalen Duren (8)	Jaden Ivey (10)	Little Caesars Arena; 18,313	16–64
81	April 7	@ Indiana	W 122–115	Jaden Ivey (29)	Jalen Duren (10)	Jaden Ivey (9)	Gainbridge Fieldhouse; 17,274	17–64
82	April 9	@ Chicago	L 81–103	Killian Hayes (26)	Jalen Duren (18)	Cory Joseph (9)	United Center; 21,530	17–65

2022–23 season schedule

== Player statistics ==
Legend
GP	Games played	GS	Games started	MPG	Minutes per game
FG%	Field-goal percentage	3P%	3-point field-goal percentage	FT%	Free-throw percentage
RPG	Rebounds per game	APG	Assists per game	SPG	Steals per game
BPG	Blocks per game	PPG	Points per game

=== Regular season ===
Detroit Pistons statistics
Player	GP	GS	MPG	FG%	3P%	FT%	RPG	APG	SPG	BPG	PPG
Killian Hayes	76	56	28.3	.377	.280	.821	2.9	6.2	1.4	.4	10.3
Jaden Ivey	74	73	31.1	.416	.343	.747	3.9	5.2	.8	.2	16.3
Jalen Duren	67	31	24.9	.648	.000	.611	8.9	1.1	.7	.9	9.1
Cory Joseph	62	2	19.8	.427	.389	.792	1.7	3.5	.5	.1	6.9
Bojan Bogdanović	59	59	32.1	.488	.411	.884	3.8	2.6	.6	.1	21.6
Hamidou Diallo	56	0	17.8	.573	.238	.588	3.5	1.0	.9	.3	9.3
Saddiq Bey^{†}	52	30	28.8	.404	.345	.861	4.7	1.6	1.0	.2	14.8
Isaiah Livers	52	22	23.1	.417	.365	.821	2.8	.8	.5	.5	6.7
Alec Burks	51	8	22.0	.436	.414	.814	3.1	2.2	.7	.2	12.8
Isaiah Stewart	50	47	28.3	.442	.327	.738	8.1	1.4	.4	.7	11.3
Marvin Bagley III	42	25	23.6	.529	.288	.750	6.4	.9	.5	.7	12.0
Kevin Knox II^{†}	42	1	14.1	.469	.371	.788	2.6	.4	.3	.3	5.6
Rodney McGruder	32	12	16.4	.408	.423	.818	2.3	.9	.5	.0	5.7
James Wiseman^{†}	24	22	25.2	.531	.167	.712	8.1	.7	.2	.8	12.7
R. J. Hampton^{†}	21	3	18.5	.423	.365	.667	2.3	1.0	.5	.2	7.3
Eugene Omoruyi^{†}	17	4	21.9	.425	.293	.723	3.5	1.0	.8	.2	9.7
Nerlens Noel^{†}	14	3	10.9	.400	.500	.700	2.6	.5	.9	.6	2.3
Jared Rhoden	14	0	14.1	.386	.250	1.000	2.6	.3	.3	.1	3.2
Cade Cunningham	12	12	33.3	.415	.279	.837	6.2	6.0	.8	.6	19.9
Buddy Boeheim	10	0	9.0	.185	.160	1.000	.6	.4	.2	.0	1.6
Braxton Key	3	0	3.0	1.000		1.000	.3	.0	.0	.0	1.3
Stanley Umude	1	0	2.0	.000	.000	1.000	.0	.0	1.0	1.0	2.0

- ^{†} Denotes player spent time with another team in the season. Stats reflect time with the Pistons only.

== Transactions ==
=== Overview ===
Players Added

Via draft

- Jaden Ivey
- Ismaël Kamagate

Via trade

- Bojan Bogdanović
- Alec Burks
- Jalen Duren
- Nerlens Noel
- Kemba Walker
- James Wiseman

Via free agency

- Buddy Boeheim
- R. J. Hampton
- Kevin Knox
- Eugene Omoruyi
- Jared Rhoden
Players Lost

Via trade

- Saddiq Bey
- Jerami Grant
- Ismaël Kamagate
- Kevin Knox
- Saben Lee
- Kelly Olynyk
- Nikola Radičević

Via free agency

- Carsen Edwards
- Luka Garza
- Frank Jackson
- Jamorko Pickett
- Justin Robinson
- Deividas Sirvydis
- Derrick Walton

Waived

- Braxton Key
- Nerlens Noel
- Kemba Walker

=== Trades ===
July 6, 2022	To Detroit Pistons Draft rights to Gabriele Procida; 2025 protected first-round pick (from Portland via Milwaukee); 2025 Detroit second-round pick 2026 second-round pick	To Portland Trail Blazers Jerami Grant; Draft rights to Ismaël Kamagate
July 6, 2022	To Detroit Pistons Kemba Walker; Draft rights to Jalen Duren	To New York Knicks 2025 protected first-round pick (from Portland via Milwaukee)
July 11, 2022	To Detroit Pistons Alec Burks; Nerlens Noel; 2023 second-round pick 2026 second-round pick (from Minnesota or New York); Cash considerations	To New York Knicks Draft rights to Nikola Radičević; 2025 protected second-round pick
September 26, 2022	To Detroit Pistons Bojan Bogdanović	To Utah Jazz Saben Lee; Kelly Olynyk; Cash considerations
February 9, 2023	Four-team trade
February 9, 2023	To Atlanta Hawks Saddiq Bey (from Detroit)	To Golden State Warriors Gary Payton II (from Portland); Two future second-round picks (from Atlanta)
February 9, 2023	To Portland Trail Blazers Kevin Knox (from Detroit); Five future second-round picks	To Detroit Pistons James Wiseman (from Golden State)

=== Free agency ===
==== Re-signed ====
Date	Player	Ref.
July 6	Marvin Bagley III	
August 2	Rodney McGruder	
October 31	Bojan Bogdanović	

==== Additions ====
Date	Player	Former team	Ref.
July 2	Buddy Boeheim	Syracuse Orange	
August 2	Kevin Knox	Atlanta Hawks	
December 27	Jared Rhoden	Seton Hall Pirates	
February 23	R. J. Hampton	Orlando Magic	
March 3	Eugene Omoruyi	Oklahoma City Thunder	

==== Subtractions ====
Date	Player	Reason	New team	Ref.
July 5	Derrick Walton	Unrestricted free agent	(Australia) Sydney Kings	
July 31	Carsen Edwards	Unrestricted free agent	(Turkey) Fenerbahçe	
August 10	Justin Robinson	Unrestricted free agent	(Australia) Illawarra Hawks	
August 18	Deividas Sirvydis	Unrestricted free agent	Indiana Pacers	
August 23	Luka Garza	Unrestricted free agent	Minnesota Timberwolves	
September 9	Jamorko Pickett	Unrestricted free agent	Cleveland Cavaliers	
September 20	Frank Jackson	Unrestricted free agent	Phoenix Suns	
October 17	Kemba Walker	Waived	Dallas Mavericks	
December 27	Braxton Key	Waived	Delaware Blue Coats	
February 28	Nerlens Noel	Waived	Brooklyn Nets	
