= Killian Hayes =

French-American basketball player (born 2001)

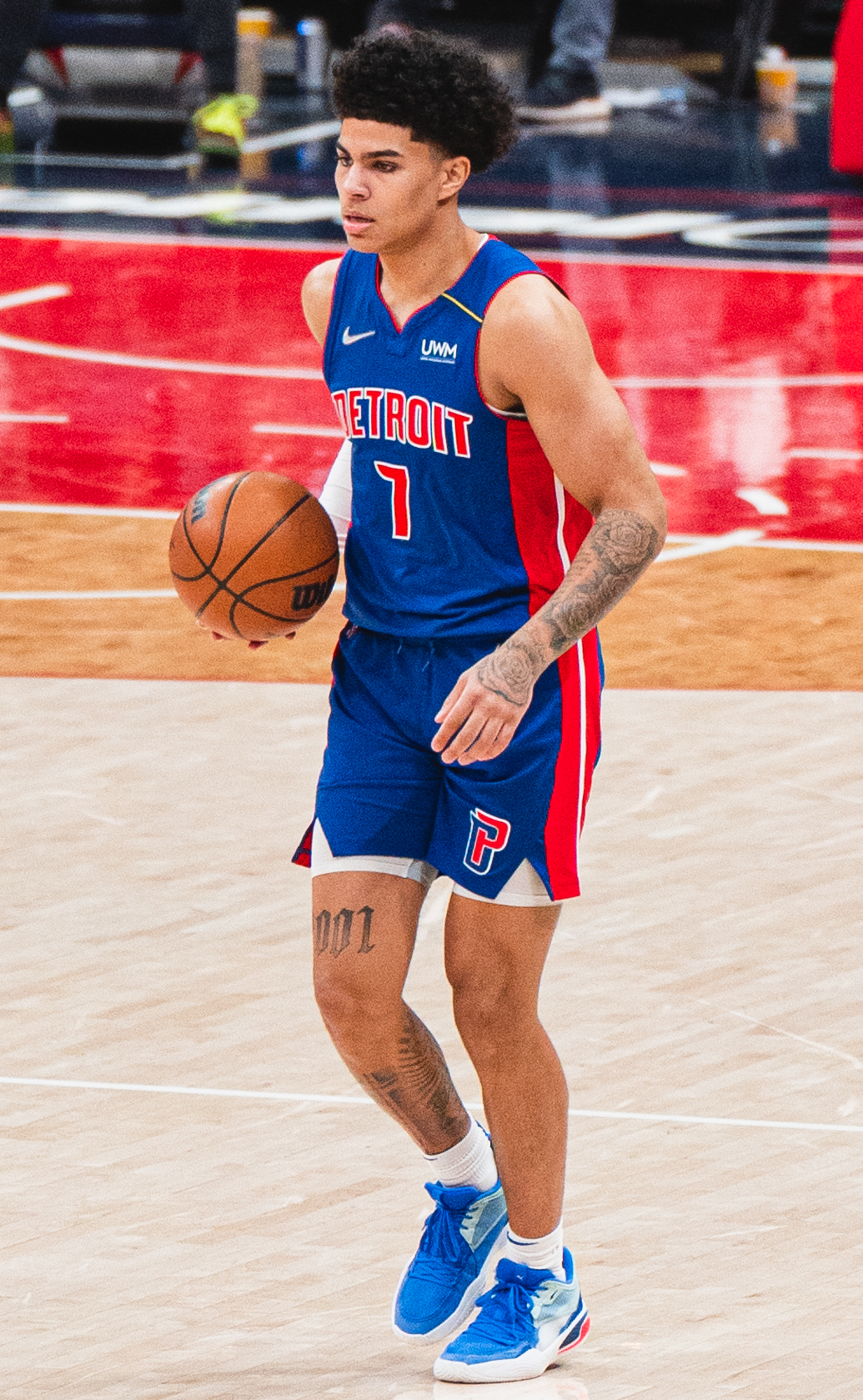
- Hayes with the Detroit Pistons in 2022

No. 9 – FC Barcelona
- Position: Point guard
- League: Liga ACB; EuroLeague

Personal information
- Born: July 27, 2001 (age 25) Lakeland, Florida, U.S.
- Listed height: 6 ft 4 in (1.93 m)
- Listed weight: 195 lb (88 kg)

Career information
- NBA draft: 2020: 1st round, 7th overall pick
- Drafted by: Detroit Pistons
- Playing career: 2017–present

Career history
- 2017–2019: Cholet
- 2019–2020: Ratiopharm Ulm
- 2020–2024: Detroit Pistons
- 2024–2025: Long Island Nets
- 2025: Brooklyn Nets
- 2025–2026: Cleveland Charge
- 2026: Sacramento Kings
- 2026–present: FC Barcelona

Career highlights
- All-NBA G League Second Team (2026); FIBA U16 EuroBasket MVP (2017)
- Stats at NBA.com
- Stats at Basketball Reference
Medals
Men's basketball
Representing France
FIBA Under-17 World Cup
Silver medal – second place	2018 Argentina	Team
FIBA U16 European Championship
Gold medal – first place	2017 Montenegro	Team

Killian Deron Antron Hayes (/ˈkɪliən/ KIL-ee-ən; born July 27, 2001) is a French-American professional basketball player for FC Barcelona of the Liga ACB and the EuroLeague. The son of basketball player DeRon Hayes, he was born in Lakeland, Florida but grew up in France due to his father's professional career. From a young age, Hayes played with French club Cholet and excelled at the junior level: he debuted for Cholet's senior team at age 16 before receiving regular playing time in the following season. He was drafted 7th overall by the Detroit Pistons in the 2020 NBA draft.

In 2019–20, he moved to Germany to play for Ulm. Hayes won the gold medal and earned most valuable player (MVP) honors with France at the 2017 FIBA U16 European Championship. He led his team to a silver medal at the 2018 FIBA Under-17 World Cup.

== Early life and career ==
Hayes was born in Lakeland, Florida in the United States, in the same hospital as his father, DeRon Hayes, who was playing basketball in the American Basketball Association (ABA) at the time. One year later, Hayes began living in Cholet, France after his father continued his career in the LNB Pro A, the country's top league. He played basketball from an early age, facing older opponents and often playing pick-up games in Lakeland and Orlando, Florida. Hayes watched highlights of basketball games on YouTube, drawing inspiration from basketball player Dwyane Wade and AND1 mixtapes, to learn new moves. He grew up playing for Cholet Basket, his father's former club, at the youth level. Although he wanted to play high school and college basketball in the United States, he remained in France upon the advice of his father, who had come from the American basketball system.

In 2016, Hayes turned down an opportunity to join INSEP, a prestigious sports institute in Paris, upon his parents' guidance. He began playing for Espoirs Cholet in LNB Espoirs, the French under-21 league, in the 2016–17 season and was five to seven years younger than many of his opponents. In seven Espoirs games, Hayes averaged 4.7 points and 2.3 assists in 15.4 minutes per game. In April 2017, he recorded 13 points, seven assists and five steals, sharing most valuable player (MVP) honors with Addison Patterson, at the Jordan Brand Classic International Game. In the 2017–18 season, Hayes averaged 16.6 points, 3.9 rebounds and 7.2 assists per game for Espoirs Cholet. He was named league MVP after the regular season and helped his team win the Trophée du Futur (Trophy of the Future), being named MVP of the competition.

== Professional career ==
=== Cholet (2017–2019) ===
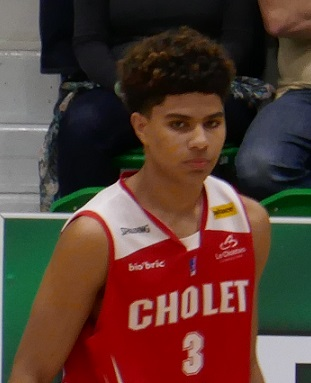
Hayes with Cholet in 2018

Hayes made his debut with the Cholet senior team on October 21, 2017, at 16 years, two months and 24 days of age, playing two minutes in a loss to Nanterre 92 in the LNB Pro A. In February 2018, he played in the Basketball Without Borders camp during NBA All-Star Weekend in Los Angeles, where he was the second-youngest participant. In his Pro A season finale on May 15, 2018, Hayes recorded 12 points and six assists in a win over Le Mans for his best performance of the season. He finished the season averaging 2.2 points and 1.2 assists in 9.1 minutes per game, through nine appearances.

Before the 2018–19 season, he signed a three-year professional contract with Cholet after considering various other European clubs. On September 22, 2018, after missing three weeks with back and toe injuries, Hayes scored 12 points in a loss to Strasbourg in his first appearance of the season. After his team was last place in its league early in the season, it parted ways with head coach Régis Boissié, who was replaced by Erman Kunter. Due to Cholet's struggles, Hayes initially believed he had "made a huge mistake by staying in Europe." At 2019 NBA All-Star Weekend in Charlotte, North Carolina in February, he competed at the Basketball Without Borders camp for the second time. On May 30, 2019, Hayes tallied a season-high 17 points, five rebounds and five steals in a loss to Élan Chalon. In 34 games, Hayes averaged 7.1 points and 3.1 assists per game.

=== Ulm (2019–2020) ===
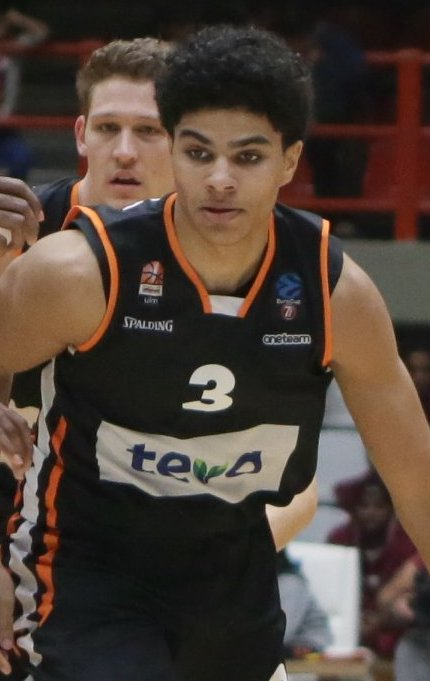
Hayes with Ulm in 2019

On August 2, 2019, Hayes signed a three-year contract with ratiopharm Ulm of the Basketball Bundesliga (BBL), the top league in Germany, and the EuroCup. He debuted on September 24, posting 15 points, six rebounds and six assists in a win over Rasta Vechta. Hayes played his first EuroCup game on October 2, finishing with eight points, nine assists and three steals in a loss to Virtus Bologna. On November 3, he recorded his first career double-double, with 11 points and 11 assists in a loss to Alba Berlin. Two weeks later, Hayes scored a then-career-high 24 points, along with five assists and three steals, in an 81–78 victory over Brose Bamberg. On November 20, he tallied 12 points and 11 assists in a loss to Promitheas Patras, becoming the second-youngest player to ever register a double-double in the EuroCup, the youngest being Ricky Rubio. Hayes established a new career-high in scoring on December 18, with 25 points, five three-pointers and five assists in a 96–92 defeat to Maccabi Rishon LeZion. He recorded 20 points and 10 assists in a 112–106 overtime loss to Alba Berlin on February 11. When the BBL was suspended on March 8 due to the COVID-19 pandemic, Hayes returned to his family in Lakeland. On 27 March, he declared for the 2020 NBA draft. Hayes did not play in the BBL Final Tournament held that June. He finished the season averaging 11.6 points, 5.4 assists, 2.8 rebounds and 1.5 steals per game through 33 combined games in the EuroCup, BBL and BBL-Pokal.

=== Detroit Pistons (2020–2024) ===
Hayes was drafted seventh overall in the 2020 NBA draft by the Detroit Pistons. On December 1, 2020, Hayes signed his rookie scale contract with the Pistons. On January 4, 2021, in a 115–125 loss to the Milwaukee Bucks, he suffered a hip injury, which was diagnosed as a labral tear two days later. On January 20, he was ruled out for at least two months due to the injury. On April 29, Hayes recorded a season-high 11 assists in a 105–115 loss to the Dallas Mavericks. On May 9, he scored a season-high 21 points, alongside seven rebounds and eight assists, in a 96–108 loss to the Chicago Bulls.

On February 11, 2022, Hayes recorded a career-high 12 assists, alongside eleven points, in a 119–141 blowout loss to the Charlotte Hornets. On April 1, he logged a career-high 26 points, along with eight assists, seven rebounds, and five steals, in a 110–101 win over the Oklahoma City Thunder.

On December 28, 2022, Hayes was ejected from a game against the Orlando Magic. While pursuing a loose ball, the Magic's Mo Wagner gave Hayes an arm-to-arm shove, sending Hayes into the Pistons' bench. This led to Hayes' teammate Hamidou Diallo pushing Wagner from behind and then Hayes punching Wagner in the back of the head, causing Wagner to appear to lose consciousness before laying in the arms of a player on the Pistons' bench for more than a dozen seconds. All three players were ejected from the game. The next day, the NBA announced that Hayes would be suspended for three games without pay as a result of the incident. He made 76 total appearances (including 56 starts) for Detroit during the regular season, averaging 10.3 points, 2.9 rebounds, and 6.2 assists.

Hayes made 42 appearances (including 31 starts) for Detroit during the 2023–24 NBA season, recording averages of 6.9 points, 2.8 rebounds, and 4.9 assists. On February 8, 2024, Hayes was waived by the Pistons.

=== Brooklyn / Long Island Nets (2024–2025) ===
On September 20, 2024, Hayes signed with the Brooklyn Nets, but was waived on October 19. On October 27, he joined the Long Island Nets. On February 19, 2025, Hayes signed a 10-day contract with Brooklyn after Bojan Bogdanović was waived. In six appearances (five starts) for Brooklyn, Hayes averaged 9.0 points, 3.0 rebounds, and 5.2 assists. He was not re-signed by the Nets to another 10-day contract and rejoined the Long Island Nets.

=== Cleveland Charge (2025–2026) ===
On September 24, 2025, Hayes signed with the Cleveland Cavaliers. The Cavaliers waived him on October 16, but was then added to the training camp roster of Cleveland's NBA G League affiliate, the Cleveland Charge.

=== Sacramento Kings (2026) ===
On February 23, 2026, Hayes signed a 10-day contract with the Sacramento Kings. On March 5, Sacramento signed Hayes to a second 10-day contract. He made his first start for the Kings on March 11 against the Charlotte Hornets, recording 11 points and four assists on 5-of-9 shooting. On March 15, Hayes signed a two-year contract with Sacramento. He finished the season having appeared in 23 games (including three starts), in which he averaged 5.5 points, 2.3 rebounds, and 3.5 assists. On June 29, Sacramento declined their team option on Hayes, making him a free agent.

== National team career ==
While representing France, Hayes was named MVP of the 2017 FIBA U16 European Championship in Podgorica, Montenegro. He averaged 16.6 points, seven rebounds and 5.1 assists per game and led his team to a gold medal. At the 2018 FIBA Under-17 Basketball World Cup in Argentina, Hayes won a silver medal and was named to the All-Star Five after averaging 16.1 points, 3.6 rebounds, 3.3 assists and 2.7 steals per game. In July 2019, the French Federation of Basketball imposed a six-game suspension on Hayes for not playing in the 2019 FIBA U20 European Championship in Tel Aviv, Israel.

== Player profile ==
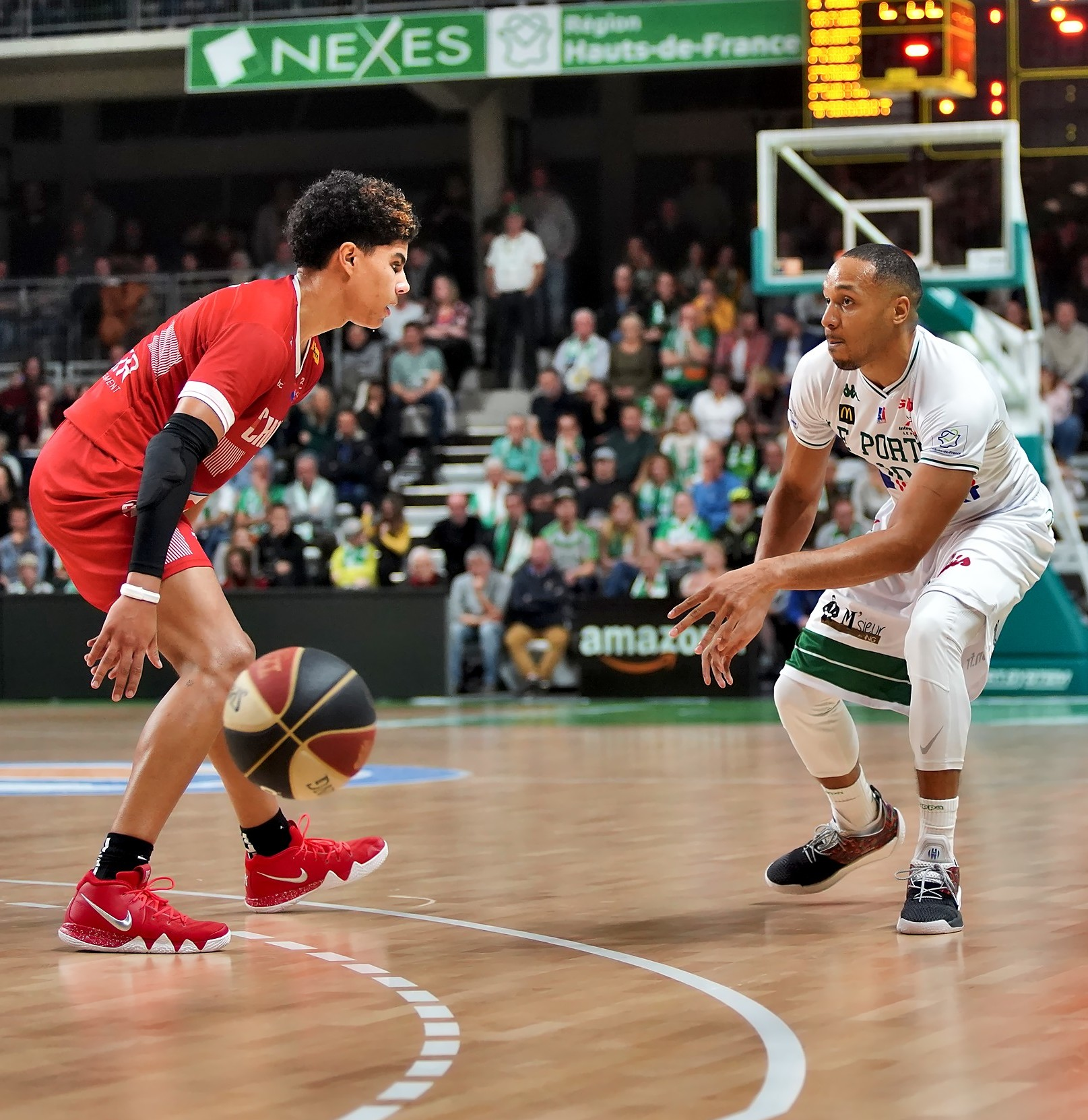
Hayes (left), with Cholet, defending Le Portel's Brandyn Curry in 2018

Hayes primarily functions as a point guard. Listed at a height of 1.96 m (6 ft 5 in), he possesses above-average size for his position, although he is not regarded by analysts as an extraordinary athlete. Hayes is left-handed and rarely handles the ball with his right hand, which sometimes limits him. He models his offensive game after that of James Harden, another left-handed guard. Hayes has drawn the most praise for his playmaking repertoire. In February 2020, The Athletic writer Sam Vecenie said that "his vision is absolutely off the charts, and his ability to complete passes off of a live dribble with his left hand is unbelievable out of ball screens." Hayes thrives as a pick and roll ball-handler and is comfortable operating in a half-court offense. At the same time, he can be prone to turning the ball over. Hayes displays good shooting form and often attempts step-back jump shots, but his three-point shooting is considered a work in progress. He excels in shooting off the dribble as opposed to in catch-and-shoot situations. Hayes is an accurate free throw shooter and has good touch around the basket, with an advanced floater. He can guard shooting guards and smaller-sized small forwards. While his lack of lateral quickness prevents him from being a great perimeter defender, he is more effective as an off-ball and pick and roll defender.

== Career statistics ==
Legend
GP	Games played	GS	Games started	MPG	Minutes per game
FG%	Field goal percentage	3P%	3-point field goal percentage	FT%	Free throw percentage
RPG	Rebounds per game	APG	Assists per game	SPG	Steals per game
BPG	Blocks per game	PPG	Points per game	**Bold**	Career high

=== NBA ===
Year	Team	GP	GS	MPG	FG%	3P%	FT%	RPG	APG	SPG	BPG	PPG
2020–21	Detroit	26	18	25.8	.353	.278	.824	2.7	5.3	1.0	.4	6.8
2021–22	Detroit	66	40	25.0	.383	.263	.770	**3.2**	4.2	1.2	.5	6.9
2022–23	Detroit	**76**	**56**	**28.3**	.377	.280	.821	2.9	**6.2**	**1.4**	.4	**10.3**
2023–24	Detroit	42	31	24.0	.413	.297	.660	2.8	4.9	.9	**.5**	6.9
2024–25	Brooklyn	6	5	27.1	**.419**	**.381**	.833	3.0	5.2	.7	**.7**	9.0
2025–26	Sacramento	23	3	17.7	.304	.270	**.929**	2.3	3.5	.9	.2	5.5
Career		239	153	25.3	.377	.280	.792	2.9	5.0	1.1	.4	7.9

=== EuroCup ===
Year	Team	GP	GS	MPG	FG%	3P%	FT%	RPG	APG	SPG	BPG	PPG
2019–20	Ulm	10	10	26.8	.455	.390	.909	2.3	6.2	1.5	.2	12.8

== Personal life ==
Hayes has an American father, DeRon Hayes, who played college basketball as a forward for the Penn State Nittany Lions in the early 1990s and left as one of the program's most prolific scorers. DeRon played professionally in France, Portugal, Sweden, Ukraine and Russia. He spent much of the prime years of his career with French clubs Cholet and SLUC Nancy. Hayes' mother, Sandrine (née Demiannay), is a native of Cholet, France and is a former basketball player as well. His parents met because his mother's sister was the girlfriend of his father's teammate.
