= Jared Rhoden =

American basketball player (born 1999)

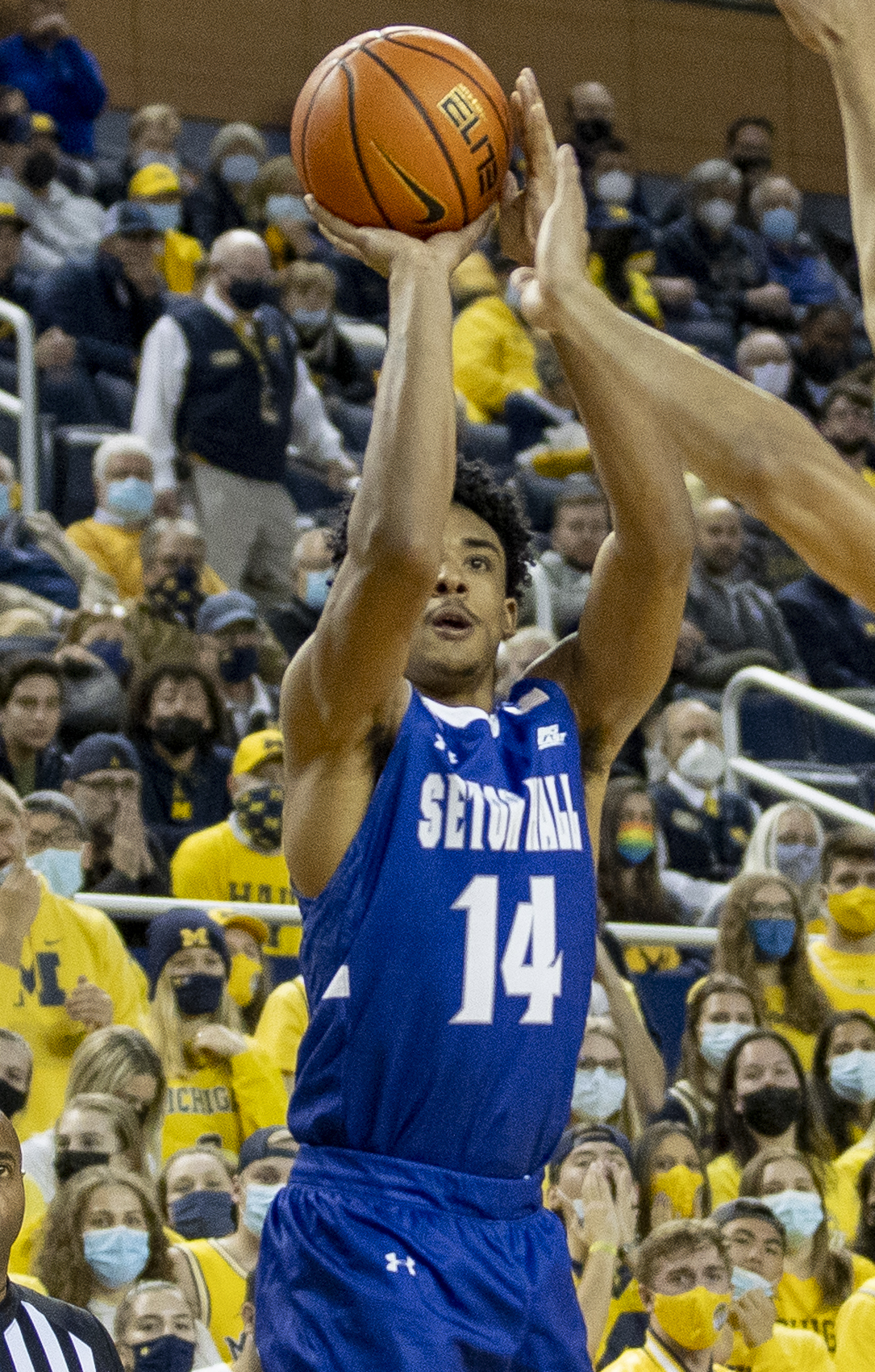
- Rhoden with Seton Hall in 2021

No. 8 – Paris Basketball
- Position: Shooting guard / small forward
- League: LNB Élite; EuroLeague

Personal information
- Born: August 27, 1999 (age 27) Baldwin, New York, U.S.
- Listed height: 6 ft 5 in (1.96 m)
- Listed weight: 210 lb (95 kg)

Career information
- High school: Baldwin (Baldwin, New York); Our Saviour Lutheran (The Bronx, New York)
- College: Seton Hall (2018–2022)
- NBA draft: 2022: undrafted
- Playing career: 2022–present

Career history
- 2022: College Park Skyhawks
- 2022–2024: Detroit Pistons
- 2022–2024: →Motor City Cruise
- 2024: Charlotte Hornets
- 2024: →Greensboro Swarm
- 2025: Toronto Raptors
- 2024–2025: →Raptors 905
- 2025–present: Paris Basketball

Career highlights
- First-team All-Big East (2022)
- Stats at NBA.com
- Stats at Basketball Reference

Matthew Jared Rhoden (/ˈroʊdən/ ROH-dən; born August 27, 1999) is an American professional basketball player for Paris Basketball of the LNB Élite and EuroLeague. He played college basketball for the Seton Hall Pirates.

== High school career ==
Rhoden played basketball for Baldwin Senior High School in Baldwin, New York. As a junior, he averaged 19.5 points and 6.7 rebounds per game. Rhoden led his team to the Long Island AA championship and was named Nassau County Player of the Year. He reclassified to the 2018 class and transferred to Our Saviour Lutheran School in The Bronx. As a senior, Rhoden averaged 29.3 points, seven rebounds and three assists per game, earning All-USA Today New York First Team honors. He competed for the New York Lightning on the Amateur Athletic Union circuit. He committed to playing college basketball for Seton Hall over offers from Saint Louis, Wichita State and Penn State.

== College career ==
Rhoden underwent shoulder surgery before his freshman season at Seton Hall. As a freshman, he averaged 3.4 points and 2.6 rebounds per game. He averaged 9.1 points and 6.4 rebounds per game in his sophomore season as a part-time starter. On December 23, 2020, Rhoden posted a season-high 26 points, 12 rebounds and four assists in a 78–67 win against Georgetown. As a junior, he averaged 14.9 points, 6.7 rebounds, 1.9 assists and 1.2 steals per game. Rhoden was named to the Big East All-Tournament Team after averaging 20.5 points and 10.5 rebounds in two games during the 2021 Big East tournament. On November 22, 2021, he scored a career-high 29 points in a 79–76 loss to Ohio State. Rhoden was named to the First Team All-Big East as a senior.

== Professional career ==
=== College Park Skyhawks (2022) ===
After going undrafted in the 2022 NBA draft, Rhoden signed with the Portland Trail Blazers on August 3, 2022, but was waived prior to the start of the season. On November 4, he was named to the opening night roster for the College Park Skyhawks.

=== Detroit Pistons / Motor City Cruise (2022–2024) ===
On December 26, 2022, Rhoden signed a two-way contract with the Detroit Pistons, splitting time with their NBA G League affiliate, the Motor City Cruise.

On July 2, 2023, Rhoden signed another two-way contract with the Pistons, and joined them for the 2023 NBA Summer League.

On August 19, 2024, Rhoden signed with the Toronto Raptors, but was waived on October 19.

=== Charlotte Hornets / Greensboro Swarm (2024) ===
On October 21, 2024, Rhoden was claimed off waivers by the Charlotte Hornets, subsequently converting his deal into a two-way contract. On November 30, he was waived by the Hornets.

=== Raptors 905 (2024–2025) ===
On December 8, 2024, Rhoden joined Raptors 905.

=== Toronto Raptors (2025) ===
On March 4, 2025, the Toronto Raptors signed Rhoden to a two-way contract. In his first career start, he led the Raptors to a March 12 win over the Philadelphia 76ers with a career-high 25 points and 12 rebounds, making four three-pointers and collecting four steals. In 10 appearances (2 starts) for Toronto during the 2024–25 NBA season, Rhoden averaged 11.4 points, 3.8 rebounds, and 1.4 assists. On April 22, it was announced that Rhoden had undergone surgery to repair a torn labrum in his right shoulder. On July 1, the Raptors waived Rhoden. The Raptors re-signed Rhoden on September 27. He was waived again by the team on October 16.

=== Paris Basketball (2025–present) ===
On November 1, 2025, the Paris Basketball of the LNB Élite and EuroLeague announced Rhoden as a new player.

== Career statistics ==
Legend
GP	Games played	GS	Games started	MPG	Minutes per game
FG%	Field goal percentage	3P%	3-point field goal percentage	FT%	Free throw percentage
RPG	Rebounds per game	APG	Assists per game	SPG	Steals per game
BPG	Blocks per game	PPG	Points per game	**Bold**	Career high

=== NBA ===
Year	Team	GP	GS	MPG	FG%	3P%	FT%	RPG	APG	SPG	BPG	PPG
2022–23	Detroit	14	0	14.1	.386	.250	**1.000**	2.6	.3	.3	.1	3.2
2023–24	Detroit	**17**	0	14.4	.500	**.387**	.625	1.9	.8	.2	**.8**	4.9
2024–25	Charlotte	4	0	3.0	.250	.000	—	1.0	.5	.3	.0	1.0
2024–25	Toronto	10	**2**	**21.5**	**.506**	.324	.880	**3.8**	**1.4**	**.9**	.2	**11.4**
Career		45	2	14.9	.467	.322	.846	2.5	.8	.4	.4	5.5

=== College ===
Year	Team	GP	GS	MPG	FG%	3P%	FT%	RPG	APG	SPG	BPG	PPG
2018–19	Seton Hall	**34**	0	12.8	.342	.246	.568	2.6	.4	.5	.3	3.4
2019–20	Seton Hall	30	15	25.7	**.441**	**.337**	.623	6.4	1.1	**1.2**	.3	9.1
2020–21	Seton Hall	27	27	**34.6**	.429	.303	**.833**	**6.7**	**1.9**	**1.2**	.4	14.9
2021–22	Seton Hall	31	**30**	33.1	.390	.336	.803	**6.7**	1.2	**1.2**	**.6**	**15.5**
Career		122	72	26.0	.407	.312	.754	5.5	1.1	1.0	.4	10.4
