= 2022–23 Milwaukee Bucks season =

2022–23 NBA season by team

- Division champions
- Head coach: Mike Budenholzer
- General manager: Jon Horst
- Owners: Wesley Edens; Marc Lasry
- Arena: Fiserv Forum

Results
- Record: 58–24 (.707)
- Place: Division: 1st (Central); Conference: 1st (Eastern)
- Playoff finish: First round (lost to Heat 1–4)
- Stats at Basketball Reference

Local media
- Television: Bally Sports Wisconsin
- Radio: WTMJ

The 2022–23 Milwaukee Bucks season was the 55th season for the franchise in the National Basketball Association (NBA). On August 17, 2022, the NBA announced that the regular season for the league would begin October 18, 2022 and end on April 9, 2023. They won their fifth straight central division championship on March 28, 2023, after winning over the Detroit Pistons.

With a final record of 58–24, the Bucks finished the regular season as the best record in the league for the third time in the past five seasons, and won the inaugural edition of the new Maurice Podoloff Trophy.

Despite this, the Bucks were upset by the 8-seeded and eventual Eastern Conference champion Miami Heat in the first round of the playoffs in five games, becoming the sixth 1-seed in league history to lose a playoff series against an 8-seed following the Seattle SuperSonics in 1994, the Miami Heat in 1999, the Dallas Mavericks in 2007, the San Antonio Spurs in 2011, and the Chicago Bulls in 2012. It was also widely regarded as one of the biggest upsets in NBA history.

Following their exit from the postseason, the Bucks fired head coach Mike Budenholzer after five seasons.

== Draft ==
Round	Pick	Player	Position(s)	Nationality	College / Club
1	24	MarJon Beauchamp	SF/SG	United States	NBA G League Ignite

The Bucks own their first-round pick. They initially had a second round pick, but it was forfeited due to tampering violations with respect to free agency in 2021. With their only pick of the draft at #24, the Bucks would select guard/forward MarJon Beauchamp from the NBA G League Ignite. It would be the second season in a row that the Bucks would select from the NBA G League Ignite, though unlike the previous season, they would keep Beauchamp on their roster.

== Roster ==
2022–23 Milwaukee Bucks roster
Players

Pos.	No.	Player	Height	Weight	DOB	From
G	12	Grayson Allen	6 ft 4 in (1.93 m)	198 lb (90 kg)	1995-10-08	Duke
F	34	Giannis Antetokounmpo (C)	7 ft 0 in (2.13 m)	243 lb (110 kg)	1994-12-06	Greece
F	43	Thanasis Antetokounmpo	6 ft 7 in (2.01 m)	219 lb (99 kg)	1992-07-18	Greece
F	0	MarJon Beauchamp	6 ft 7 in (2.01 m)	199 lb (90 kg)	2000-10-12	Yakima Valley
G	5	Jevon Carter	6 ft 1 in (1.85 m)	200 lb (91 kg)	1995-09-14	West Virginia
G	24	Pat Connaughton	6 ft 5 in (1.96 m)	209 lb (95 kg)	1993-01-06	Notre Dame
F	99	Jae Crowder	6 ft 6 in (1.98 m)	235 lb (107 kg)	1990-07-06	Marquette
G	31	Goran Dragić	6 ft 4 in (1.93 m)	190 lb (86 kg)	1986-05-06	Slovenia
G	20	A. J. Green (TW)	6 ft 5 in (1.96 m)	190 lb (86 kg)	1999-09-27	Northern Iowa
G	21	Jrue Holiday	6 ft 5 in (1.96 m)	205 lb (93 kg)	1990-06-12	UCLA
G/F	7	Joe Ingles	6 ft 9 in (2.06 m)	220 lb (100 kg)	1987-10-02	Australia
F/C	3	Meyers Leonard	7 ft 0 in (2.13 m)	260 lb (118 kg)	1992-02-27	Illinois
C	11	Brook Lopez	7 ft 1 in (2.16 m)	282 lb (128 kg)	1988-04-01	Stanford
G/F	23	Wesley Matthews	6 ft 5 in (1.96 m)	220 lb (100 kg)	1986-10-14	Marquette
F	22	Khris Middleton (C)	6 ft 7 in (2.01 m)	222 lb (101 kg)	1991-08-12	Texas A&M
F/C	9	Bobby Portis	6 ft 11 in (2.11 m)	250 lb (113 kg)	1995-02-10	Arkansas
G	28	Lindell Wigginton (TW)	6 ft 1 in (1.85 m)	189 lb (86 kg)	1998-03-28	Iowa State

Coaches
Head coach
- Mike Budenholzer
Assistant(s)
- Vin Baker
- DeMarre Carroll
- Mike Dunlap
- Chad Forcier
- Charles Lee (associate HC)
- Vince Legarza
- Josh Oppenheimer
- Patrick St. Andrews

Legend
- (DP) Unsigned draft pick
- (FA) Free agent
- (S) Suspended
- (GL) On assignment to G League affiliate
- (TW) Two-way affiliate player
- Injured

Roster
Updated: March 7, 2023

== Standings ==
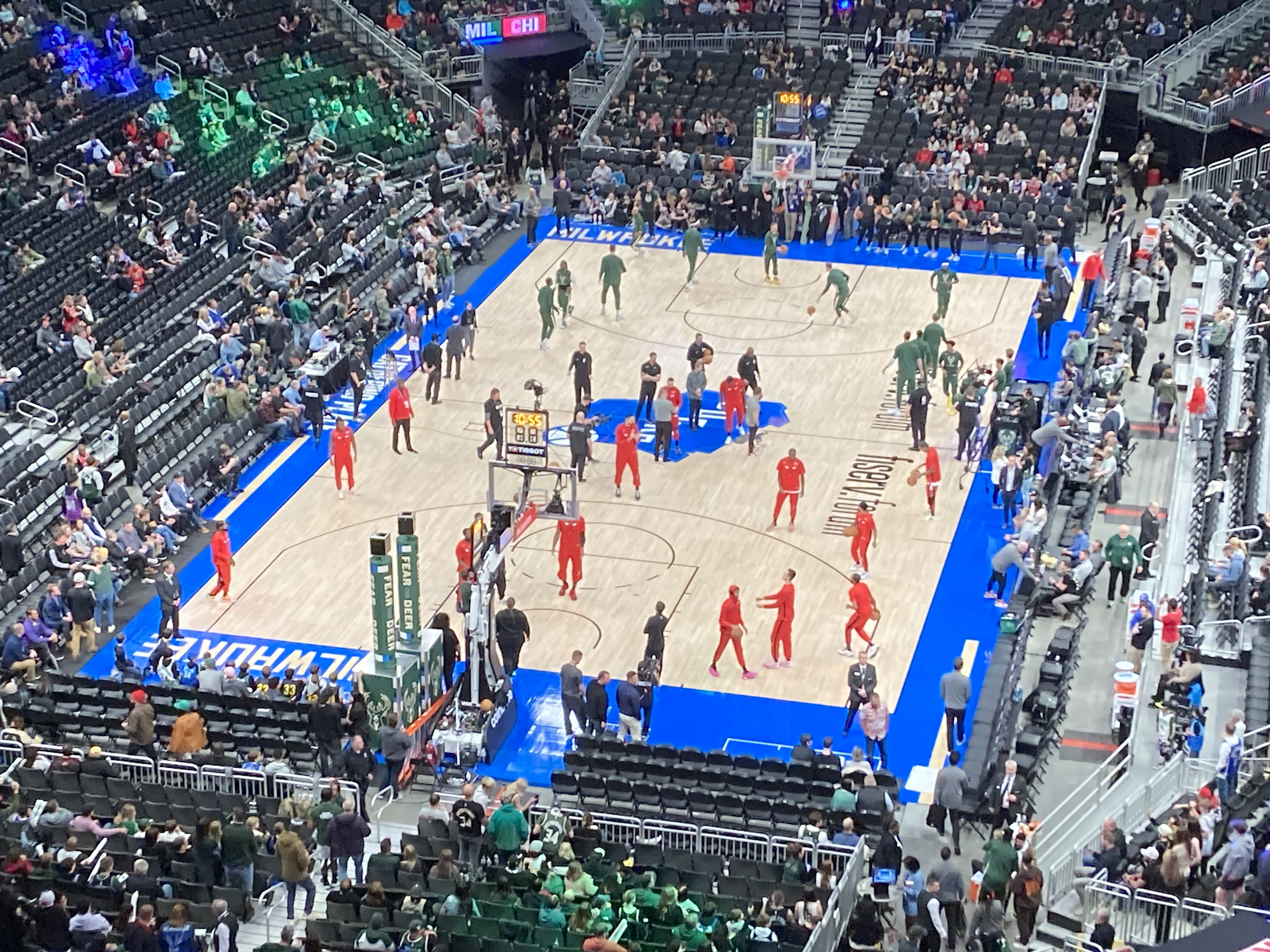
Milwaukee warming up before a game against the Chicago Bulls

=== Division ===
Central Division	W	L	PCT	GB	Home	Road	Div	GP
z – Milwaukee Bucks	58	24	.707	–	32‍–‍9	26‍–‍15	11–5	82
x – Cleveland Cavaliers	51	31	.622	7.0	31‍–‍10	20‍–‍21	13–3	82
pi – Chicago Bulls	40	42	.488	18.0	22‍–‍19	18‍–‍23	7–9	82
Indiana Pacers	35	47	.427	23.0	20‍–‍21	15‍–‍26	7–9	82
Detroit Pistons	17	65	.207	41.0	9‍–‍32	8‍–‍33	2–14	82

=== Conference ===
Eastern Conference
#	Team	W	L	PCT	GB	GP
1	z – Milwaukee Bucks *	58	24	.707	–	82
2	y – Boston Celtics *	57	25	.695	1.0	82
3	x – Philadelphia 76ers	54	28	.659	4.0	82
4	x – Cleveland Cavaliers	51	31	.622	7.0	82
5	x – New York Knicks	47	35	.573	11.0	82
6	x – Brooklyn Nets	45	37	.549	13.0	82
7	y – Miami Heat *	44	38	.537	14.0	82
8	x – Atlanta Hawks	41	41	.500	17.0	82
9	pi – Toronto Raptors	41	41	.500	17.0	82
10	pi – Chicago Bulls	40	42	.488	18.0	82
11	Indiana Pacers	35	47	.427	23.0	82
12	Washington Wizards	35	47	.427	23.0	82
13	Orlando Magic	34	48	.415	24.0	82
14	Charlotte Hornets	27	55	.329	31.0	82
15	Detroit Pistons	17	65	.207	41.0	82

== Game log ==
=== Preseason ===
2022 preseason game log
Total: 0–5 (home: 0–3; road: 0–2)
Preseason: 0–5 (home: 0–3; road: 0–2)

Game	Date	Team	Score	High points	High rebounds	High assists	Location Attendance	Record
1	October 1	Memphis	L 102–107	Jordan Nwora (21)	Jordan Nwora (8)	Jevon Carter (4)	Fiserv Forum; 13,023	0–1
2	October 6	@ Atlanta	L 113–123	Giannis Antetokounmpo (19)	G. Antetokounmpo, Ibaka, Portis (7)	Jrue Holiday (7)	Etihad Arena; 11,449	0–2
3	October 8	Atlanta	L 109–118	Lindell Wigginton (16)	Ibaka, Portis (5)	Carter, Holiday, Mamukelashvili (4)	Etihad Arena; 11,563	0–3
4	October 11	@ Chicago	L 104–127	Jordan Nwora (25)	Sandro Mamukelashvili (9)	Lindell Wigginton (5)	United Center; 19,356	0–4
5	October 12	Brooklyn	L 97–107	Giannis Antetokounmpo (24)	Giannis Antetokounmpo (14)	G. Antetokounmpo, Holiday, Carter, Nwora (4)	Fiserv Forum; 12,544	0–5

2022–23 preseason schedule

=== Regular season ===
2022–23 game log
Total: 58–24 (home: 32–9; road: 26–15)
October: 6–0 (home: 5–0; road: 1–0)

Game	Date	Team	Score	High points	High rebounds	High assists	Location Attendance	Record
1	October 20	@ Philadelphia	W 90–88	Giannis Antetokounmpo (21)	Giannis Antetokounmpo (13)	G. Antetokounmpo, Holiday (8)	Wells Fargo Center; 20,060	1–0
2	October 22	Houston	W 125–105	Giannis Antetokounmpo (44)	Giannis Antetokounmpo (12)	Jrue Holiday (10)	Fiserv Forum; 17,341	2–0
3	October 26	Brooklyn	W 110–99	Giannis Antetokounmpo (43)	Giannis Antetokounmpo (14)	Giannis Antetokounmpo (5)	Fiserv Forum; 17,341	3–0
4	October 28	New York	W 119–108	Giannis Antetokounmpo (30)	Giannis Antetokounmpo (14)	Giannis Antetokounmpo (9)	Fiserv Forum; 17,341	4–0
5	October 29	Atlanta	W 123–115	G. Antetokounmpo, Holiday (34)	Giannis Antetokounmpo (17)	Jrue Holiday (11)	Fiserv Forum; 17,341	5–0
6	October 31	Detroit	W 110–108	Giannis Antetokounmpo (31)	Bobby Portis (12)	Jrue Holiday (10)	Fiserv Forum; 17,341	6–0

November: 9–5 (home: 6–2; road: 3–3)

Game	Date	Team	Score	High points	High rebounds	High assists	Location Attendance	Record
7	November 2	Detroit	W 116–91	Giannis Antetokounmpo (32)	Giannis Antetokounmpo (12)	G. Antetokounmpo, Allen (4)	Fiserv Forum; 17,341	7–0
8	November 4	@ Minnesota	W 115–102	Jrue Holiday (29)	Giannis Antetokounmpo (13)	Giannis Antetokounmpo (11)	Target Center; 17,136	8–0
9	November 5	Oklahoma City	W 108–94	Brook Lopez (25)	Bobby Portis (21)	Jrue Holiday (13)	Fiserv Forum; 17,713	9–0
10	November 7	@ Atlanta	L 98–117	Giannis Antetokounmpo (25)	Bobby Portis (10)	Jrue Holiday (7)	State Farm Arena; 17,494	9–1
11	November 9	@ Oklahoma City	W 136–132 (2OT)	Jevon Carter (36)	Brook Lopez (13)	Jevon Carter (12)	Paycom Center; 15,180	10–1
12	November 11	@ San Antonio	L 93–111	Jevon Carter (21)	Bobby Portis (12)	Jevon Carter (6)	AT&T Center; 15,642	10–2
13	November 14	Atlanta	L 106–121	Giannis Antetokounmpo (27)	Bobby Portis (10)	Jevon Carter (6)	Fiserv Forum; 17,341	10–3
14	November 16	Cleveland	W 113–98	Brook Lopez (29)	Giannis Antetokounmpo (12)	G. Antetokounmpo, Carter (8)	Fiserv Forum; 17,341	11–3
15	November 18	@ Philadelphia	L 102–110	Giannis Antetokounmpo (25)	Giannis Antetokounmpo (14)	G. Antetokounmpo, Holiday (4)	Wells Fargo Center; 19,769	11–4
16	November 21	Portland	W 119–111	Giannis Antetokounmpo (37)	Grayson Allen (8)	G. Antetokounmpo, Holiday (6)	Fiserv Forum; 17,341	12–4
17	November 23	Chicago	L 113–118	Giannis Antetokounmpo (36)	Bobby Portis (12)	Jrue Holiday (11)	Fiserv Forum; 17,341	12–5
18	November 25	Cleveland	W 117–102	Giannis Antetokounmpo (38)	Giannis Antetokounmpo (9)	Giannis Antetokounmpo (6)	Fiserv Forum; 17,447	13–5
19	November 27	Dallas	W 124–115	Giannis Antetokounmpo (30)	Giannis Antetokounmpo (11)	Carter, Holiday (6)	Fiserv Forum; 17,341	14–5
20	November 30	@ New York	W 109–103	Giannis Antetokounmpo (37)	Giannis Antetokounmpo (13)	Giannis Antetokounmpo (7)	Madison Square Garden; 17,277	15–5

December: 8–7 (home: 4–1; road: 4–6)

Game	Date	Team	Score	High points	High rebounds	High assists	Location Attendance	Record
21	December 2	L.A. Lakers	L 129–133	Giannis Antetokounmpo (40)	Bobby Portis (10)	Jrue Holiday (9)	Fiserv Forum; 17,938	15–6
22	December 3	@ Charlotte	W 105–96	Bobby Portis (20)	Bobby Portis (8)	Bobby Portis (7)	Spectrum Center; 18,128	16–6
23	December 5	@ Orlando	W 109–102	Giannis Antetokounmpo (34)	Giannis Antetokounmpo (13)	Jrue Holiday (10)	Amway Center; 16,174	17–6
24	December 7	Sacramento	W 126–113	Giannis Antetokounmpo (35)	Brook Lopez (9)	Giannis Antetokounmpo (7)	Fiserv Forum; 17,341	18–6
25	December 9	@ Dallas	W 106–105	Giannis Antetokounmpo (28)	Giannis Antetokounmpo (10)	Jrue Holiday (6)	American Airlines Center; 20,277	19–6
26	December 11	@ Houston	L 92–97	Jrue Holiday (25)	Giannis Antetokounmpo (18)	Jrue Holiday (8)	Toyota Center; 16,268	19–7
27	December 13	Golden State	W 128–111	Giannis Antetokounmpo (30)	Giannis Antetokounmpo (12)	Giannis Antetokounmpo (5)	Fiserv Forum; 17,628	20–7
28	December 15	@ Memphis	L 101–142	G. Antetokounmpo, Portis (19)	Bobby Portis (7)	G. Antetokounmpo, Middleton, Hill (5)	FedExForum; 17,794	20–8
29	December 17	Utah	W 123–97	Bobby Portis (22)	Bobby Portis (14)	Jrue Holiday (8)	Fiserv Forum; 17,587	21–8
30	December 19	@ New Orleans	W 128–119	Giannis Antetokounmpo (42)	Giannis Antetokounmpo (10)	Jrue Holiday (11)	Smoothie King Center; 18,271	22–8
31	December 21	@ Cleveland	L 106–114	Giannis Antetokounmpo (45)	Giannis Antetokounmpo (14)	Jrue Holiday (8)	Rocket Mortgage FieldHouse; 19,432	22–9
32	December 23	@ Brooklyn	L 100–118	Giannis Antetokounmpo (26)	Giannis Antetokounmpo (13)	Giannis Antetokounmpo (7)	Barclays Center; 18,169	22–10
33	December 25	@ Boston	L 118–139	Giannis Antetokounmpo (27)	G. Antetokounmpo, Portis (9)	Jrue Holiday (7)	TD Garden; 19,156	22–11
34	December 28	@ Chicago	L 113–119 (OT)	Giannis Antetokounmpo (45)	Giannis Antetokounmpo (22)	Giannis Antetokounmpo (7)	United Center; 21,537	22–12
35	December 30	Minnesota	W 123–114	Giannis Antetokounmpo (43)	Giannis Antetokounmpo (20)	Joe Ingles (10)	Fiserv Forum; 18,018	23–12

January: 11–5 (home: 6–2; road: 5–3)

Game	Date	Team	Score	High points	High rebounds	High assists	Location Attendance	Record
36	January 1	Washington	L 95–118	Bobby Portis (19)	Lopez, Portis (10)	Grayson Allen (8)	Fiserv Forum; 17,341	23–13
37	January 3	Washington	W 123–113	Giannis Antetokounmpo (55)	Bobby Portis (13)	Giannis Antetokounmpo (7)	Fiserv Forum; 17,341	24–13
38	January 4	@ Toronto	W 104–101 (OT)	Giannis Antetokounmpo (30)	Giannis Antetokounmpo (21)	Giannis Antetokounmpo (10)	Scotiabank Arena; 19,800	25–13
39	January 6	Charlotte	L 109–138	Bobby Portis (19)	Bobby Portis (12)	Jrue Holiday (4)	Fiserv Forum; 17,341	25–14
40	January 9	@ New York	W 111–107	Giannis Antetokounmpo (22)	Pat Connaughton (11)	Jrue Holiday (9)	Madison Square Garden; 18,167	26–14
41	January 11	@ Atlanta	W 114–105	Jrue Holiday (27)	Giannis Antetokounmpo (18)	Giannis Antetokounmpo (10)	State Farm Arena; 17,154	27–14
42	January 12	@ Miami	L 102–108	Jrue Holiday (24)	Bobby Portis (7)	Jrue Holiday (11)	FTX Arena; 19,600	27–15
43	January 14	@ Miami	L 95–111	Bobby Portis (15)	Pat Connaughton (8)	Jrue Holiday (10)	Miami-Dade Arena; 19,620	27–16
44	January 16	Indiana	W 132–119	Jrue Holiday (35)	Bobby Portis (11)	Jrue Holiday (11)	Fiserv Forum; 17,412	28–16
45	January 17	Toronto	W 130–122	Jrue Holiday (37)	Bobby Portis (12)	Joe Ingles (8)	Fiserv Forum; 17,341	29–16
46	January 21	@ Cleveland	L 102–114	Jrue Holiday (28)	Bobby Portis (11)	Jrue Holiday (10)	Rocket Mortgage FieldHouse; 19,432	29–17
47	January 23	@ Detroit	W 150–130	Giannis Antetokounmpo (29)	Giannis Antetokounmpo (12)	Jrue Holiday (7)	Little Caesars Arena; 18,011	30–17
48	January 25	Denver	W 107–99	Giannis Antetokounmpo (33)	Giannis Antetokounmpo (14)	Giannis Antetokounmpo (4)	Fiserv Forum; 17,352	31–17
49	January 27	@ Indiana	W 141–131	Giannis Antetokounmpo (41)	Giannis Antetokounmpo (12)	Jrue Holiday (9)	Gainbridge Fieldhouse; 16,090	32–17
50	January 29	New Orleans	W 135–110	Giannis Antetokounmpo (50)	Giannis Antetokounmpo (13)	Jrue Holiday (6)	Fiserv Forum; 17,341	33–17
51	January 31	Charlotte	W 124–115	Giannis Antetokounmpo (34)	Giannis Antetokounmpo (18)	Giannis Antetokounmpo (4)	Fiserv Forum; 17,341	34–17

February: 10–0 (home: 5–0; road: 5–0)

Game	Date	Team	Score	High points	High rebounds	High assists	Location Attendance	Record
52	February 2	L.A. Clippers	W 106–105	Giannis Antetokounmpo (54)	Giannis Antetokounmpo (19)	Jrue Holiday (8)	Fiserv Forum; 17,341	35–17
53	February 4	Miami	W 123–115	Giannis Antetokounmpo (35)	Giannis Antetokounmpo (15)	Giannis Antetokounmpo (11)	Fiserv Forum; 18,008	36–17
54	February 6	@ Portland	W 127–108	Brook Lopez (27)	Giannis Antetokounmpo (13)	G. Antetokounmpo, Holiday (8)	Moda Center; 18,110	37–17
55	February 9	@ L.A. Lakers	W 115–106	Giannis Antetokounmpo (38)	G. Antetokounmpo, Lopez (10)	Jrue Holiday (7)	Crypto.com Arena; 18,997	38–17
56	February 10	@ L.A. Clippers	W 119–106	Giannis Antetokounmpo (35)	Brook Lopez (15)	G. Antetokounmpo, Holiday, Ingles (6)	Crypto.com Arena; 16,614	39–17
57	February 14	Boston	W 131–125 (OT)	Jrue Holiday (40)	Giannis Antetokounmpo (13)	Giannis Antetokounmpo (9)	Fiserv Forum; 17,623	40–17
58	February 16	@ Chicago	W 112–100	Brook Lopez (33)	G. Antetokounmpo, Ingles, Lopez (7)	Jrue Holiday (9)	United Center; 20,308	41–17
ASG	February 19	Team Giannis @ Team LeBron	W 184–175	Jayson Tatum (55)	Jayson Tatum (10)	Donovan Mitchell (10)	Vivint Arena; 17,886	1–0
59	February 24	Miami	W 128–99	Jrue Holiday (24)	Bobby Portis (11)	Jrue Holiday (7)	Fiserv Forum; 17,676	42–17
60	February 26	Phoenix	W 104–101	Jrue Holiday (33)	Brook Lopez (13)	Khris Middleton (6)	Fiserv Forum; 17,636	43–17
61	February 28	@ Brooklyn	W 118–104	Giannis Antetokounmpo (33)	Giannis Antetokounmpo (15)	Jrue Holiday (8)	Barclays Center; 17,732	44–17

March: 11–5 (home: 4–3; road: 7–2)

Game	Date	Team	Score	High points	High rebounds	High assists	Location Attendance	Record
62	March 1	Orlando	W 139–117	Giannis Antetokounmpo (31)	Giannis Antetokounmpo (7)	Jrue Holiday (9)	Fiserv Forum; 17,354	45–17
63	March 4	Philadelphia	L 130–133	Giannis Antetokounmpo (34)	Giannis Antetokounmpo (13)	Jrue Holiday (13)	Fiserv Forum; 18,100	45–18
64	March 6	@ Washington	W 117–111	Giannis Antetokounmpo (23)	Giannis Antetokounmpo (9)	Giannis Antetokounmpo (13)	Capital One Arena; 18,746	46–18
65	March 7	@ Orlando	W 134–123	Brook Lopez (26)	Bobby Portis (11)	Khris Middleton (11)	Amway Center; 16,110	47–18
66	March 9	Brooklyn	W 118–113	Bobby Portis (28)	Bobby Portis (13)	Holiday, Middleton (7)	Fiserv Forum; 17,341	48–18
67	March 11	@ Golden State	L 116–125 (OT)	Lopez, Middleton (19)	Bobby Portis (13)	Jrue Holiday (8)	Chase Center; 18,064	48–19
68	March 13	@ Sacramento	W 133–124	Giannis Antetokounmpo (46)	Giannis Antetokounmpo (12)	Khris Middleton (9)	Golden 1 Center; 18,111	49–19
69	March 14	@ Phoenix	W 116–104	Giannis Antetokounmpo (36)	Giannis Antetokounmpo (11)	Giannis Antetokounmpo (8)	Footprint Center; 17,071	50–19
70	March 16	Indiana	L 123–139	Giannis Antetokounmpo (25)	G. Antetokounmpo, Portis (9)	Jrue Holiday (11)	Fiserv Forum; 17,797	50–20
71	March 19	Toronto	W 118–111	Brook Lopez (26)	Giannis Antetokounmpo (13)	Giannis Antetokounmpo (10)	Fiserv Forum; 17,431	51–20
72	March 22	San Antonio	W 130–94	Giannis Antetokounmpo (31)	Giannis Antetokounmpo (14)	Khris Middleton (10)	Fiserv Forum; 17,756	52–20
73	March 24	@ Utah	W 144–116	Grayson Allen (25)	Brook Lopez (14)	Giannis Antetokounmpo (11)	Vivint Arena; 18,206	53–20
74	March 25	@ Denver	L 106–129	Giannis Antetokounmpo (31)	Giannis Antetokounmpo (9)	Jrue Holiday (7)	Ball Arena; 19,919	53–21
75	March 27	@ Detroit	W 126–117	Khris Middleton (34)	Lopez, Portis (14)	Grayson Allen (7)	Little Caesars Arena; 21,090	54–21
76	March 29	@ Indiana	W 149–136	Jrue Holiday (51)	Giannis Antetokounmpo (17)	Giannis Antetokounmpo (12)	Gainbridge Fieldhouse; 16,524	55–21
77	March 30	Boston	L 99–140	Giannis Antetokounmpo (24)	Bobby Portis (10)	Holiday, Middleton (4)	Fiserv Forum; 18,073	55–22

April : 3–2 (home: 2–1; road: 1–1)

Game	Date	Team	Score	High points	High rebounds	High assists	Location Attendance	Record
78	April 2	Philadelphia	W 117–104	Giannis Antetokounmpo (33)	Giannis Antetokounmpo (14)	Khris Middleton (9)	Fiserv Forum; 17,532	56–22
79	April 4	@ Washington	W 140–128	Giannis Antetokounmpo (28)	Bobby Portis (20)	G. Antetokounmpo, Holiday (10)	Capital One Arena; 19,098	57–22
80	April 5	Chicago	W 105–92	Bobby Portis (27)	Bobby Portis (13)	Jrue Holiday (15)	Fiserv Forum; 17,679	58–22
81	April 7	Memphis	L 114–137	Lindell Wigginton (25)	Thanasis Antetokounmpo (8)	Lindell Wigginton (11)	Fiserv Forum; 18,010	58–23
82	April 9	@ Toronto	L 105–121	Lindell Wigginton (17)	Meyers Leonard (12)	Crowder, Ingles (6)	Scotiabank Arena; 19,800	58–24

2022–23 season schedule

=== Playoffs ===
2023 playoff game log
Total: 1–4 (home: 1–2; road: 0–2)
First Round: 1–4 (home: 1–2; road: 0–2)

Game	Date	Team	Score	High points	High rebounds	High assists	Location Attendance	Series
1	April 16	Miami	L 117–130	Khris Middleton (33)	Khris Middleton (9)	Jrue Holiday (16)	Fiserv Forum; 17,381	0–1
2	April 19	Miami	W 138–122	Brook Lopez (25)	Bobby Portis (15)	Jrue Holiday (11)	Fiserv Forum; 17,576	1–1
3	April 22	@ Miami	L 99–121	Khris Middleton (23)	Bobby Portis (10)	Khris Middleton (6)	Kaseya Center; 19,734	1–2
4	April 24	@ Miami	L 114–119	Brook Lopez (36)	Brook Lopez (11)	Giannis Antetokounmpo (13)	Kaseya Center; 19,614	1–3
5	April 26	Miami	L 126–128 (OT)	Giannis Antetokounmpo (38)	Giannis Antetokounmpo (20)	Holiday, Middleton (6)	Fiserv Forum; 18,113	1–4

2023 playoff schedule

== Player statistics ==
Legend
GP	Games played	GS	Games started	MPG	Minutes per game
FG%	Field-goal percentage	3P%	3-point field-goal percentage	FT%	Free-throw percentage
RPG	Rebounds per game	APG	Assists per game	SPG	Steals per game
BPG	Blocks per game	PPG	Points per game

=== Regular season ===
Milwaukee Bucks statistics
Player	GP	GS	MPG	FG%	3P%	FT%	RPG	APG	SPG	BPG	PPG
Jevon Carter	81	39	22.3	.423	.421	.816	2.5	2.4	.8	.4	8.0
Brook Lopez	78	78	30.4	.531	.374	.784	6.7	1.3	.5	2.5	15.9
Grayson Allen	72	70	27.4	.440	.399	.905	3.3	2.3	.9	.2	10.4
Bobby Portis	70	22	26.0	.496	.370	.768	9.6	1.5	.4	.2	14.1
Jrue Holiday	67	65	32.6	.479	.384	.859	5.1	7.4	1.2	.4	19.3
Giannis Antetokounmpo	63	63	32.1	.553	.275	.645	11.8	5.7	.8	.8	31.1
Pat Connaughton	61	33	23.7	.392	.339	.659	4.6	1.3	.6	.2	7.6
MarJon Beauchamp	52	11	13.5	.395	.331	.730	2.2	.7	.4	.1	5.1
Wesley Matthews	52	0	15.8	.363	.315	.857	2.2	.7	.4	.3	3.4
Joe Ingles	46	0	22.7	.435	.409	.857	2.8	3.3	.7	.1	6.9
Jordan Nwora^{†}	38	3	15.7	.386	.392	.860	3.1	1.0	.3	.2	6.0
Thanasis Antetokounmpo	37	0	5.6	.435	.000	.500	1.2	.4	.1	.1	1.4
A. J. Green	35	1	9.9	.424	.419	1.000	1.3	.6	.2	.0	4.4
George Hill^{†}	35	0	19.1	.447	.311	.739	1.9	2.5	.5	.1	5.0
Khris Middleton	33	19	24.3	.436	.315	.902	4.2	4.9	.7	.2	15.1
Sandro Mamukelashvili^{†}	24	0	9.0	.328	.219	.667	2.3	.7	.2	.2	2.4
Jae Crowder	18	3	18.9	.479	.436	.833	3.8	1.5	.7	.3	6.9
Serge Ibaka	16	0	11.6	.481	.333	.615	2.8	.3	.1	.4	4.1
Meyers Leonard	9	2	12.7	.483	.389	.889	3.8	.1	.2	.0	4.8
Lindell Wigginton	7	1	12.4	.486	.333	.889	1.0	2.0	.0	.3	7.1
Goran Dragić^{†}	7	0	11.9	.389	.412	1.000	1.7	1.7	.3	.0	5.6

=== Playoffs ===
Milwaukee Bucks statistics
Player	GP	GS	MPG	FG%	3P%	FT%	RPG	APG	SPG	BPG	PPG
Jrue Holiday	5	5	38.2	.400	.286	.692	6.6	8.0	1.0	.4	17.8
Brook Lopez	5	5	36.4	.582	.412	.769	6.4	1.2	1.4	1.8	19.0
Khris Middleton	5	5	34.6	.465	.406	.867	6.4	6.2	.6	.0	23.8
Grayson Allen	5	5	29.8	.463	.483	.857	2.4	1.8	.4	.0	11.6
Bobby Portis	5	2	21.4	.488	.278	1.000	8.2	1.2	.6	.4	9.6
Joe Ingles	5	0	17.8	.522	.500		1.2	2.0	.6	.2	6.8
Pat Connaughton	4	0	22.0	.567	.478	.750	5.0	1.8	1.0	.3	12.0
Jevon Carter	4	0	12.3	.222	.143		1.0	1.0	.3	.0	1.3
Jae Crowder	4	0	10.3	.231	.000	.500	1.0	.8	.5	.0	1.8
Giannis Antetokounmpo	3	3	30.3	.528	.000	.452	11.0	5.3	.3	.7	23.3
Wesley Matthews	2	0	20.5	.444	.571		1.5	.5	1.0	.5	6.0
Goran Dragić	2	0	3.5	.000	.000	1.000	.0	.5	.0	.0	2.0
MarJon Beauchamp	2	0	2.5	.667	1.000		.5	.0	.0	.0	2.5
Thanasis Antetokounmpo	2	0	2.5				.0	.0	.0	.0	.0
Meyers Leonard	2	0	2.5	.000			.5	.0	.0	.0	.0

- ^{†} Denotes player spent time with another team in the season. Stats reflect time with the Bucks only.

== Transactions ==
=== Trades ===
June 24, 2022	To Milwaukee Bucks Draft rights to Hugo Besson (No. 58)	To Indiana Pacers Cash considerations

=== Free agency ===
==== Re-signed ====
Date	Player	Ref.
July 6	Jevon Carter	
July 6	Wesley Matthews	
July 6	Bobby Portis	

==== Additions ====
Date	Player	Former team	Ref.
July 6	Joe Ingles	Portland Trail Blazers	
