= 2022–23 Orlando Magic season =

- Head coach: Jamahl Mosley
- General manager: John Hammond
- Owners: RDV Sports, Inc.
- Arena: Amway Center

Results
- Record: 34–48 (.415)
- Place: Division: 4th (Southeast); Conference: 13th (Eastern)
- Playoff finish: Did not qualify
- Stats at Basketball Reference

Local media
- Television: Bally Sports Florida
- Radio: 96.9 The Game

The 2022–23 Orlando Magic season was the 34th season of the franchise in the National Basketball Association (NBA). Finishing with the second-worst record in the NBA in the previous season, the Magic were awarded the first overall pick following the NBA draft lottery and used it to draft Paolo Banchero, who would later win the 2023 NBA Rookie of the Year award.

Despite improving upon their 22–60 record from the previous season, the Magic were eliminated from playoff contention for the third consecutive season after a loss to the Cleveland Cavaliers on April 4, 2023.

== Draft picks ==
Round	Pick	Player	Position	Nationality	College/Club team
1	1	Paolo Banchero	Power forward	Italy; United States	Duke
2	32	Caleb Houstan	Small forward/ Shooting guard	Canada	Michigan

The Magic entered the draft with the first overall pick and a second-round selection that landed 32nd overall.

== Roster ==
2022–23 Orlando Magic roster
Players

Pos.	No.	Player	Height	Weight	DOB	From
G	50	Cole Anthony	6 ft 3 in (1.91 m)	185 lb (84 kg)	2000-05-15	North Carolina
F	5	Paolo Banchero	6 ft 10 in (2.08 m)	250 lb (113 kg)	2002-11-12	Duke
C	35	Goga Bitadze	6 ft 11 in (2.11 m)	250 lb (113 kg)	1999-07-20	Georgia
F/C	10	Bol Bol	7 ft 2 in (2.18 m)	220 lb (100 kg)	1999-11-16	Oregon
C	34	Wendell Jr. Carter	6 ft 10 in (2.08 m)	270 lb (122 kg)	1999-04-16	Duke
G	11	Michael Carter-Williams	6 ft 5 in (1.96 m)	190 lb (86 kg)	1991-10-10	Syracuse
G	20	Markelle Fultz	6 ft 4 in (1.93 m)	209 lb (95 kg)	1998-05-29	Washington
G	14	Gary Harris	6 ft 4 in (1.93 m)	210 lb (95 kg)	1994-09-14	Michigan State
G	7	Kevon Harris (TW)	6 ft 6 in (1.98 m)	216 lb (98 kg)	1997-06-24	Stephen F. Austin
F	2	Caleb Houstan	6 ft 8 in (2.03 m)	205 lb (93 kg)	2003-01-09	Michigan
F	1	Jonathan Isaac (injured)	6 ft 10 in (2.08 m)	230 lb (104 kg)	1997-10-03	Florida State
F	3	Chuma Okeke	6 ft 8 in (2.03 m)	229 lb (104 kg)	1998-08-18	Auburn
F	25	Admiral Schofield	6 ft 5 in (1.96 m)	241 lb (109 kg)	1997-03-30	Tennessee
G	0	Jay Scrubb (TW)	6 ft 5 in (1.96 m)	220 lb (100 kg)	2000-09-01	John A. Logan
G	4	Jalen Suggs	6 ft 5 in (1.96 m)	205 lb (93 kg)	2001-06-03	Gonzaga
F	22	Franz Wagner	6 ft 10 in (2.08 m)	220 lb (100 kg)	2001-08-27	Michigan
F/C	21	Moritz Wagner	6 ft 11 in (2.11 m)	245 lb (111 kg)	1997-04-26	Michigan

Coaches
Head coach
- Jamahl Mosley
Assistant(s)
- Bret Brielmaier
- Lionel Chalmers
- Jesse Mermuys
- Dylan Murphy
- Dale Osbourne
- Nate Tibbetts

Legend
- (DP) Unsigned draft pick
- (FA) Free agent
- (S) Suspended
- (GL) On assignment to G League affiliate
- (TW) Two-way affiliate player
- Injured

Roster
Updated: February 11, 2023

== Standings ==
=== Division ===
Southeast Division	W	L	PCT	GB	Home	Road	Div	GP
y – Miami Heat	44	38	.537	–	27‍–‍14	17‍–‍24	10–6	82
x – Atlanta Hawks	41	41	.500	3.0	24‍–‍17	17‍–‍24	8–8	82
Washington Wizards	35	47	.427	9.0	19‍–‍22	16‍–‍25	8–8	82
Orlando Magic	34	48	.415	10.0	20‍–‍21	14‍–‍27	7–9	82
Charlotte Hornets	27	55	.329	17.0	13‍–‍28	14‍–‍27	7–9	82

=== Conference ===
Eastern Conference
#	Team	W	L	PCT	GB	GP
1	z – Milwaukee Bucks *	58	24	.707	–	82
2	y – Boston Celtics *	57	25	.695	1.0	82
3	x – Philadelphia 76ers	54	28	.659	4.0	82
4	x – Cleveland Cavaliers	51	31	.622	7.0	82
5	x – New York Knicks	47	35	.573	11.0	82
6	x – Brooklyn Nets	45	37	.549	13.0	82
7	y – Miami Heat *	44	38	.537	14.0	82
8	x – Atlanta Hawks	41	41	.500	17.0	82
9	pi – Toronto Raptors	41	41	.500	17.0	82
10	pi – Chicago Bulls	40	42	.488	18.0	82
11	Indiana Pacers	35	47	.427	23.0	82
12	Washington Wizards	35	47	.427	23.0	82
13	Orlando Magic	34	48	.415	24.0	82
14	Charlotte Hornets	27	55	.329	31.0	82
15	Detroit Pistons	17	65	.207	41.0	82

== Game log ==
=== Preseason ===
2022 preseason game log
Total: 4–1 (Home: 2–0; Road: 2–1)
Preseason: 4–1 (home: 2–0; road: 2–1)

Game	Date	Team	Score	High points	High rebounds	High assists	Location Attendance	Record
1	October 3	@ Memphis	L 97–109	Cole Anthony (17)	Bol Bol (6)	R. J. Hampton (7)	FedEx Forum; 13,431	0–1
2	October 6	@ San Antonio	W 102–99	Wendell Carter Jr. (20)	Wendell Carter Jr. (10)	Banchero, Carter Jr., Hampton, Suggs, F. Wagner (3)	AT&T Center; 11,561	1–1
3	October 7	@ Dallas	W 110–105	Paolo Banchero (19)	Wendell Carter Jr. (8)	Anthony, Carter Jr. (5)	American Airlines Center; 19,360	2–1
4	October 11	Memphis	W 109–105	Wendell Carter Jr. (18)	Franz Wagner (10)	Franz Wagner (8)	Amway Center; 16,006	3–1
5	October 14	Cleveland	W 114–108	Paolo Banchero (17)	Bamba, Carter Jr. (7)	Franz Wagner (4)	Amway Center; 17,063	4–1

2022–23 pre-season schedule

=== Regular season ===
2022–23 game log
Total: 34–48 (Home: 20–21; Road: 14–27)
October: 1–6 (home: 1–1; road: 0–5)

Game	Date	Team	Score	High points	High rebounds	High assists	Location Attendance	Record
1	October 19	@ Detroit	L 109–113	Paolo Banchero (27)	Wendell Carter Jr. (11)	Banchero, F. Wagner (5)	Little Caesars Arena; 20,190	0–1
2	October 21	@ Atlanta	L 98–108	Cole Anthony (25)	Paolo Banchero (12)	Franz Wagner (3)	State Farm Arena; 17,822	0–2
3	October 22	Boston	L 120–126	Terrence Ross (29)	Wendell Carter Jr. (12)	Cole Anthony (6)	Amway Center; 19,299	0–3
4	October 24	@ New York	L 102–115	Paolo Banchero (21)	Wendell Carter Jr. (11)	Franz Wagner (5)	Madison Square Garden; 18,800	0–4
5	October 26	@ Cleveland	L 92–103	Paolo Banchero (29)	Bol Bol (10)	Anthony, F. Wagner (5)	Rocket Mortgage FieldHouse; 19,432	0–5
6	October 28	Charlotte	W 113–93	Paolo Banchero (21)	Paolo Banchero (12)	Paolo Banchero (7)	Amway Center; 18,846	1–5
7	October 30	@ Dallas	L 105–114	Paolo Banchero (18)	Bol Bol (11)	Banchero, Carter Jr., F. Wagner (4)	American Airlines Center; 20,042	1–6

November: 4–11 (home: 3–7; road: 1–4)

Game	Date	Team	Score	High points	High rebounds	High assists	Location Attendance	Record
8	November 1	@ Oklahoma City	L 108–116	Wendell Carter Jr. (30)	Bol, Carter Jr. (12)	Franz Wagner (7)	Paycom Center; 13,109	1–7
9	November 3	Golden State	W 130–129	Jalen Suggs (26)	Chuma Okeke (9)	Jalen Suggs (9)	Amway Center; 18,846	2–7
10	November 5	Sacramento	L 123–126 (OT)	Paolo Banchero (33)	Paolo Banchero (15)	Carter Jr., F. Wagner (6)	Amway Center; 18,846	2–8
11	November 7	Houston	L 127–134	Paolo Banchero (30)	Wendell Carter Jr. (7)	Franz Wagner (7)	Amway Center; 15,441	2–9
12	November 9	Dallas	W 94–87	Franz Wagner (22)	Wendell Carter Jr. (12)	Franz Wagner (6)	Amway Center; 18,165	3–9
13	November 11	Phoenix	W 114–97	Wendell Carter Jr. (20)	Bol Bol (15)	Carter Jr., Suggs (5)	Amway Center; 15,879	4–9
14	November 14	Charlotte	L 105–112	Franz Wagner (23)	Mo Bamba (11)	Jalen Suggs (7)	Amway Center; 15,018	4–10
15	November 16	Minnesota	L 108–126	Bol Bol (26)	Bol Bol (12)	Jalen Suggs (6)	Amway Center; 16,527	4–11
16	November 18	@ Chicago	W 108–107	Wendell Carter Jr. (21)	Bol Bol (10)	Suggs, F. Wagner (8)	United Center; 21,031	5–11
17	November 19	@ Indiana	L 113–114	Franz Wagner (29)	Bol Bol (11)	Jalen Suggs (8)	Gainbridge Fieldhouse; 14,478	5–12
18	November 21	@ Indiana	L 102–123	Franz Wagner (20)	Bol Bol (9)	R. J. Hampton (5)	Gainbridge Fieldhouse; 14,029	5–13
19	November 25	Philadelphia	L 99–107	Franz Wagner (24)	Bol Bol (8)	Bamba, Suggs (4)	Amway Center; 15,384	5–14
20	November 27	Philadelphia	L 103–133	Paolo Banchero (18)	Moritz Wagner (6)	Gary Harris (5)	Amway Center; 16,218	5–15
21	November 28	@ Brooklyn	L 102–109	Banchero, Bol (24)	Caleb Houstan (7)	Paolo Banchero (5)	Barclays Center; 15,704	5–16
22	November 30	Atlanta	L 108–125	Franz Wagner (22)	F. Wagner, M. Wagner (6)	Moritz Wagner (8)	Amway Center; 15,344	5–17

December: 8–7 (home: 5–3; road: 3–4)

Game	Date	Team	Score	High points	High rebounds	High assists	Location Attendance	Record
23	December 2	@ Cleveland	L 96–107	Paolo Banchero (22)	Moritz Wagner (9)	Markelle Fultz (6)	Rocket Mortgage FieldHouse; 19,432	5–18
24	December 3	@ Toronto	L 108–121	Bol, Ross (18)	Bol Bol (7)	Cole Anthony (5)	Scotiabank Arena; 19,800	5–19
25	December 5	Milwaukee	L 102–109	Franz Wagner (25)	Banchero, M. Wagner (12)	Paolo Banchero (7)	Amway Center; 16,174	5–20
26	December 7	L.A. Clippers	W 116–111 (OT)	Paolo Banchero (23)	Moritz Wagner (13)	Anthony, Fultz (4)	Amway Center; 14,429	6–20
27	December 9	Toronto	W 113–109	Franz Wagner (34)	Mo Bamba (13)	Anthony, Fultz (5)	Amway Center; 17,008	7–20
28	December 11	Toronto	W 111–99	Franz Wagner (23)	Paolo Banchero (12)	Cole Anthony (6)	Amway Center; 16,891	8–20
29	December 14	Atlanta	W 135–124	Franz Wagner (24)	Bamba, Bol, Fultz (7)	Markelle Fultz (9)	Amway Center; 16,002	9–20
30	December 16	@ Boston	W 117–109	Moritz Wagner (25)	Mo Bamba (12)	Paolo Banchero (5)	TD Garden; 19,156	10–20
31	December 18	@ Boston	W 95–92	Paolo Banchero (31)	Bol Bol (8)	Markelle Fultz (5)	TD Garden; 19,156	11–20
32	December 19	@ Atlanta	L 125–126	Markelle Fultz (24)	Moritz Wagner (10)	Markelle Fultz (9)	State Farm Arena; 17,809	11–21
33	December 21	@ Houston	W 116–110	Franz Wagner (25)	Paolo Banchero (13)	Cole Anthony (6)	Toyota Center; 15,965	12–21
34	December 23	San Antonio	W 133–113	Cole Anthony (23)	Cole Anthony (10)	Cole Anthony (9)	Amway Center; 18,425	13–21
35	December 27	L.A. Lakers	L 110–129	Markelle Fultz (16)	Bamba, Banchero, Bol (5)	Anthony, Carter Jr., F. Wagner, M. Wagner (4)	Amway Center; 19,482	13–22
36	December 28	@ Detroit	L 101–121	Franz Wagner (19)	Wendell Carter Jr. (8)	Markelle Fultz (9)	Little Caesars Arena; 20,190	13–23
37	December 30	Washington	L 100–119	Franz Wagner (28)	Bol Bol (9)	Franz Wagner (8)	Amway Center; 19,040	13–24

January: 7–7 (home: 4–2; road: 3–5)

Game	Date	Team	Score	High points	High rebounds	High assists	Location Attendance	Record
38	January 4	Oklahoma City	W 126–115	Paolo Banchero (25)	Wendell Carter Jr. (13)	Paolo Banchero (7)	Amway Center; 18,925	14–24
39	January 5	Memphis	L 115–123	Paolo Banchero (30)	Paolo Banchero (9)	Markelle Fultz (9)	Amway Center; 19,184	14–25
40	January 7	@ Golden State	W 115–101	Paolo Banchero (25)	Wendell Carter Jr. (10)	Markelle Fultz (7)	Chase Center; 18,061	15–25
41	January 9	@ Sacramento	L 111–136	Paolo Banchero (17)	Paolo Banchero (8)	Markelle Fultz (5)	Golden 1 Center; 16,499	15–26
42	January 10	@ Portland	W 109–106	Franz Wagner (29)	Banchero, Carter Jr. (10)	Markelle Fultz (7)	Moda Center; 18,176	16–26
43	January 13	@ Utah	L 108–112	Franz Wagner (26)	Wendell Carter Jr. (10)	Markelle Fultz (6)	Vivint Arena; 18,206	16–27
44	January 15	@ Denver	L 116–119	Markelle Fultz (20)	Markelle Fultz (7)	Anthony, Fultz (6)	Ball Arena; 19,641	16–28
45	January 20	New Orleans	W 123–110	Franz Wagner (30)	Wendell Carter Jr. (9)	Franz Wagner (9)	Amway Center; 19,025	17–28
46	January 21	@ Washington	L 118–138	Markelle Fultz (23)	Wendell Carter Jr. (9)	Markelle Fultz (8)	Capital One Arena; 18,171	17–29
47	January 23	Boston	W 113–98	Paolo Banchero (23)	Wendell Carter Jr. (11)	Franz Wagner (6)	Amway Center; 19,196	18–29
48	January 25	Indiana	W 126–120	Paolo Banchero (23)	Wendell Carter Jr. (10)	Markelle Fultz (8)	Amway Center; 18,846	19–29
49	January 27	@ Miami	L 105–110	Anthony, Banchero, F. Wagner (19)	Wendell Carter Jr. (8)	Markelle Fultz (6)	Miami-Dade Arena; 19,788	19–30
50	January 28	Chicago	L 109–128	Moritz Wagner (27)	Paolo Banchero (7)	Cole Anthony (6)	Amway Center; 18,846	19–31
51	January 30	@ Philadelphia	W 119–109	Paolo Banchero (29)	Banchero, Carter Jr. (9)	Markelle Fultz (10)	Wells Fargo Center; 19,812	20–31

February: 6–5 (home: 2–3; road: 4–2)

Game	Date	Team	Score	High points	High rebounds	High assists	Location Attendance	Record
52	February 1	@ Philadelphia	L 94–105	Markelle Fultz (18)	Wendell Carter Jr. (13)	Banchero, Suggs (3)	Wells Fargo Center; 20,885	20–32
53	February 3	@ Minnesota	W 127–120	Cole Anthony (20)	Anthony, Banchero (8)	Cole Anthony (6)	Target Center; 17,136	21–32
54	February 5	@ Charlotte	W 119–113	Paolo Banchero (22)	Wendell Carter Jr. (12)	Anthony, Banchero, Fultz (5)	Spectrum Center; 18,510	22–32
55	February 7	New York	L 98–102	Markelle Fultz (21)	Paolo Banchero (8)	Markelle Fultz (6)	Amway Center; 19,438	22–33
56	February 9	Denver	W 115–104	Wendell Carter Jr. (19)	Paolo Banchero (10)	Cole Anthony (7)	Amway Center; 18,846	23–33
57	February 11	Miami	L 103–107 (OT)	Markelle Fultz (17)	Paolo Banchero (13)	Cole Anthony (6)	Amway Center; 18,223	23–34
58	February 13	@ Chicago	W 100–91	Paolo Banchero (22)	Markelle Fultz (10)	Markelle Fultz (9)	United Center; 20,767	24–34
59	February 14	@ Toronto	L 113–123	Wendell Carter Jr. (26)	Bol Bol (7)	Franz Wagner (6)	Scotiabank Arena; 19,800	24–35
All-Star Break
60	February 23	Detroit	W 108–106	Franz Wagner (21)	Wendell Carter Jr. (14)	Markelle Fultz (8)	Amway Center; 18,846	25–35
61	February 25	Indiana	L 108–121	Franz Wagner (21)	Wendell Carter Jr. (11)	Cole Anthony (5)	Amway Center; 19,231	25–36
62	February 27	@ New Orleans	W 101–93	Paolo Banchero (29)	Wendell Carter Jr. (11)	Markelle Fultz (5)	Smoothie King Center; 16,038	26–36

March: 7–8 (home: 4–3; road: 3–5)

Game	Date	Team	Score	High points	High rebounds	High assists	Location Attendance	Record
63	March 1	@ Milwaukee	L 117–139	Markelle Fultz (21)	Wendell Carter Jr. (10)	Banchero, Fultz (5)	Fiserv Forum; 17,354	26–37
64	March 3	@ Charlotte	W 117–106	Paolo Banchero (31)	Wendell Carter Jr. (9)	Paolo Banchero (5)	Spectrum Center; 16,683	27–37
65	March 5	Portland	L 119–122	Paolo Banchero (26)	Bol Bol (8)	Markelle Fultz (8)	Amway Center; 18,846	27–38
66	March 7	Milwaukee	L 123–134	Cole Anthony (23)	Bitadze, M. Wagner (8)	Franz Wagner (6)	Amway Center; 16,110	27–39
67	March 9	Utah	L 124–131	Paolo Banchero (26)	Paolo Banchero (8)	Fultz, Suggs (6)	Amway Center; 16,552	27–40
68	March 11	Miami	W 126–114 (OT)	Wendell Carter Jr. (27)	Wendell Carter Jr. (11)	Paolo Banchero (9)	Amway Center; 17,347	28–40
69	March 14	@ San Antonio	L 114–132	Paolo Banchero (27)	Wendell Carter Jr. (10)	Markelle Fultz (6)	AT&T Center; 13,708	28–41
70	March 16	@ Phoenix	L 113–116	Markelle Fultz (25)	Franz Wagner (10)	Markelle Fultz (9)	Footprint Center; 17,071	28–42
71	March 18	@ L.A. Clippers	W 113–108	Markelle Fultz (28)	Wendell Carter Jr. (12)	Paolo Banchero (6)	Crypto.com Arena; 17,533	29–42
72	March 19	@ L.A. Lakers	L 105–111	Banchero, F. Wagner (21)	Wendell Carter Jr. (11)	Markelle Fultz (10)	Crypto.com Arena; 18,997	29–43
73	March 21	Washington	W 122–112	Gary Harris (22)	Banchero, Carter Jr. (9)	Paolo Banchero (8)	Amway Center; 16,096	30–43
74	March 23	New York	W 111–106	Paolo Banchero (21)	Wendell Carter Jr. (8)	Markelle Fultz (8)	Amway Center; 17,607	31–43
75	March 26	Brooklyn	W 119–106	Cole Anthony (21)	Franz Wagner (10)	Markelle Fultz (9)	Amway Center; 17,862	32–43
76	March 28	@ Memphis	L 108–113	Franz Wagner (25)	Paolo Banchero (11)	Anthony, Banchero, Fultz (5)	FedExForum; 16,507	32–44
77	March 31	@ Washington	W 116–109	Paolo Banchero (30)	Paolo Banchero (12)	Paolo Banchero (6)	Capital One Arena; 16,411	33–44

April: 1–4 (home: 1–2; road: 0–2)

Game	Date	Team	Score	High points	High rebounds	High assists	Location Attendance	Record
78	April 2	Detroit	W 128–102	Jalen Suggs (18)	Banchero, Carter Jr. (9)	Franz Wagner (8)	Amway Center; 19,431	34–44
79	April 4	Cleveland	L 113–117	Markelle Fultz (23)	Wendell Carter Jr. (12)	Markelle Fultz (8)	Amway Center; 19,449	34–45
80	April 6	Cleveland	L 94–118	Jalen Suggs (22)	Bol Bol (8)	Jalen Suggs (4)	Amway Center; 19,235	34–46
81	April 7	@ Brooklyn	L 84–101	Cole Anthony (14)	Goga Bitadze (15)	Cole Anthony (6)	Barclays Center; 18,177	34–47
82	April 9	@ Miami	L 110–123	Kevon Harris (22)	Bitadze, Harris (8)	Bol, Okeke (5)	Kaseya Center; 19,894	34–48

2022–23 season schedule

== Player statistics ==
=== Regular season ===
Player	POS	GP	GS	MP	REB	AST	STL	BLK	PTS	MPG	RPG	APG	SPG	BPG	PPG
Franz Wagner	SF	80	80	2,609	329	283	77	17	1,485	32.6	4.1	3.5	1.0	.2	18.6
Paolo Banchero	PF	72	72	2,430	497	269	60	39	1,437	33.8	6.9	3.7	.8	.5	20.0
Bol Bol	PF	70	33	1,505	405	69	30	85	634	21.5	5.8	1.0	.4	1.2	9.1
Markelle Fultz	PG	60	60	1,778	234	341	87	26	837	29.6	3.9	5.7	1.5	.4	14.0
Cole Anthony	PG	60	4	1,552	288	235	37	31	781	25.9	4.8	3.9	.6	.5	13.0
Wendell Carter Jr.	C	57	54	1,690	497	132	30	33	868	29.6	8.7	2.3	.5	.6	15.2
Moritz Wagner	C	57	18	1,109	259	84	37	13	600	19.5	4.5	1.5	.6	.2	10.5
Jalen Suggs	SG	53	19	1,246	161	155	67	27	524	23.5	3.0	2.9	1.3	.5	9.9
Caleb Houstan	SF	51	4	812	99	30	12	7	193	15.9	1.9	.6	.2	.1	3.8
Gary Harris	SG	48	42	1,184	98	59	45	12	397	24.7	2.0	1.2	.9	.3	8.3
Terrence Ross^{†}	SG	42	9	944	85	54	25	8	334	22.5	2.0	1.3	.6	.2	8.0
Mo Bamba^{†}	C	40	6	681	184	42	12	38	290	17.0	4.6	1.1	.3	1.0	7.3
Admiral Schofield	PF	37	0	451	62	31	8	5	155	12.2	1.7	.8	.2	.1	4.2
Kevon Harris	SG	34	0	457	70	16	17	5	141	13.4	2.1	.5	.5	.1	4.1
Chuma Okeke	SF	27	8	518	96	37	19	11	128	19.2	3.6	1.4	.7	.4	4.7
R. J. Hampton^{†}	SG	26	0	361	39	34	16	4	149	13.9	1.5	1.3	.6	.2	5.7
Goga Bitadze^{†}	C	17	1	255	88	21	7	16	98	15.0	5.2	1.2	.4	.9	5.8
Jonathan Isaac	PF	11	0	124	44	6	14	4	55	11.3	4.0	.5	1.3	.4	5.0
Michael Carter-Williams	PG	4	0	44	5	7	1	1	17	11.0	1.3	1.8	.3	.3	4.3
Jay Scrubb	SG	2	0	30	6	1	2	0	13	15.0	3.0	.5	1.0	.0	6.5

- ^{†} Denotes player spent time with another team in the season. Stats reflect time with the Magic only.

== Transactions ==
=== Trades ===
June 23, 2022	To Orlando Magic 2028 second-round pick Cash considerations	To Los Angeles Lakers 2022 No. 35 pick

=== Free agency ===
==== Re-signed ====
Player	Signed	Ref.
Gary Harris	June 30, 2022	
Mo Bamba	July 7, 2022	
Bol Bol	July 7, 2022	
Admiral Schofield	Two-way contract	

==== Additions ====
Player	Signed	Former team	Ref.
Kevon Harris	Two-way contract	Raptors 905	

==== Subtractions ====
Player	Reason left	New team	Ref.
Robin Lopez	Free agent	Cleveland Cavaliers	
