= 2022–23 New Orleans Pelicans season =

- Head coach: Willie Green
- General manager: Trajan Langdon
- Owner: Gayle Benson
- Arena: Smoothie King Center

Results
- Record: 42–40 (.512)
- Place: Division: 2nd (Southwest); Conference: 9th (Western)
- Playoff finish: Did not qualify
- Stats at Basketball Reference

Local media
- Television: Bally Sports New Orleans
- Radio: WRNO-FM

The 2022–23 New Orleans Pelicans season was the 21st season of the New Orleans Pelicans franchise in the National Basketball Association (NBA). They would make it to the Play-In Tournament in back to back seasons, but lost to the Oklahoma City Thunder in the Play-In game.

== Draft ==
Round	Pick	Player	Position	Nationality	College / Club
1	8	Dyson Daniels	Guard / small forward	Australia	NBA G League Ignite
2	41	E. J. Liddell	Power forward	United States	Ohio State (Jr.)
2	52	Karlo Matković	Center	Croatia; Bosnia and Herzegovina	Mega Mozzart (Serbia)

The Pelicans held one first-round pick and two second-round picks entering the draft.

== Roster ==
2022–23 New Orleans Pelicans roster
Players

Pos.	No.	Player	Height	Weight	DOB	From
G	15	Jose Alvarado (injured)	6 ft 0 in (1.83 m)	179 lb (81 kg)	1998-04-12	Georgia Tech
G	11	Dyson Daniels	6 ft 7 in (2.01 m)	199 lb (90 kg)	2003-03-17	Australia
F/C	10	Jaxson Hayes (FA)	7 ft 0 in (2.13 m)	220 lb (100 kg)	2000-05-23	Texas
C	9	Willy Hernangómez (FA)	6 ft 11 in (2.11 m)	250 lb (113 kg)	1994-05-27	Spain
F	14	Brandon Ingram	6 ft 8 in (2.03 m)	190 lb (86 kg)	1997-09-02	Duke
F	5	Herbert Jones (FA)	6 ft 7 in (2.01 m)	206 lb (93 kg)	1998-10-06	Alabama
G	13	Kira Jr. Lewis	6 ft 1 in (1.85 m)	170 lb (77 kg)	2001-04-06	Alabama
F	32	E. J. Liddell (injured) (TW)	6 ft 7 in (2.01 m)	240 lb (109 kg)	2000-12-18	Ohio State
F	8	Naji Marshall (FA)	6 ft 7 in (2.01 m)	220 lb (100 kg)	1998-01-24	Xavier
G	3	CJ McCollum	6 ft 3 in (1.91 m)	190 lb (86 kg)	1991-09-19	Lehigh
F	25	Trey III Murphy	6 ft 8 in (2.03 m)	206 lb (93 kg)	2000-06-18	Virginia
F	22	Larry Jr. Nance	6 ft 8 in (2.03 m)	245 lb (111 kg)	1993-01-01	Wyoming
G	2	Josh Richardson (FA)	6 ft 6 in (1.98 m)	200 lb (91 kg)	1993-09-15	Tennessee
G	0	Dereon Seabron (TW, FA)	6 ft 5 in (1.96 m)	180 lb (82 kg)	2000-05-26	NC State
G	41	Garrett Temple	6 ft 6 in (1.98 m)	195 lb (88 kg)	1986-05-08	LSU
C	17	Jonas Valančiūnas	6 ft 11 in (2.11 m)	265 lb (120 kg)	1992-05-06	Lithuania
F	1	Zion Williamson (injured)	6 ft 7 in (2.01 m)	284 lb (129 kg)	2000-07-06	Duke

Coaches
Head coach
- Willie Green
Assistant(s)
- James Borrego (associate HC)
- Jarron Collins
- Casey Hill
- Fred Vinson

Legend
- (DP) Unsigned draft pick
- (FA) Free agent
- (S) Suspended
- (GL) On assignment to G League
- (TW) Two-way affiliate player
- Injured

Roster
Updated: June 15, 2023

== Standings ==
=== Division ===
Southwest Division	W	L	PCT	GB	Home	Road	Div	GP
y – Memphis Grizzlies	51	31	.622	–	35‍–‍6	16‍–‍25	13–3	82
pi – New Orleans Pelicans	42	40	.512	9.0	27‍–‍14	15‍–‍26	11–5	82
Dallas Mavericks	38	44	.463	13.0	23‍–‍18	15‍–‍26	9–7	82
Houston Rockets	22	60	.268	29.0	14‍–‍27	8‍–‍33	4–12	82
San Antonio Spurs	22	60	.268	29.0	14‍–‍27	8‍–‍33	3–13	82

=== Conference ===
Western Conference
#	Team	W	L	PCT	GB	GP
1	c – Denver Nuggets *	53	29	.646	–	82
2	y – Memphis Grizzlies *	51	31	.622	2.0	82
3	y – Sacramento Kings *	48	34	.585	5.0	82
4	x – Phoenix Suns	45	37	.549	8.0	82
5	x – Los Angeles Clippers	44	38	.537	9.0	82
6	x – Golden State Warriors	44	38	.537	9.0	82
7	x – Los Angeles Lakers	43	39	.524	10.0	82
8	x – Minnesota Timberwolves	42	40	.512	11.0	82
9	pi – New Orleans Pelicans	42	40	.512	11.0	82
10	pi – Oklahoma City Thunder	40	42	.488	13.0	82
11	Dallas Mavericks	38	44	.463	15.0	82
12	Utah Jazz	37	45	.451	16.0	82
13	Portland Trail Blazers	33	49	.402	20.0	82
14	Houston Rockets	22	60	.268	31.0	82
15	San Antonio Spurs	22	60	.268	31.0	82

== Game log ==
=== Preseason ===
2022 preseason game log
Total: 4–1 (Home: 2–0; Road: 2–1)
Preseason: 4–1 (home: 2–0; road: 2–1)

Game	Date	Team	Score	High points	High rebounds	High assists	Location Attendance	Record
1	October 4	@ Chicago	W 129–125	Devonte' Graham (21)	Jaxson Hayes (6)	Jose Alvarado (6)	United Center; 16,322	1–0
2	October 7	Detroit	W 107–101	Jose Alvarado (28)	Willy Hernangómez (8)	Daniels, Valančiūnas (5)	Smoothie King Center; 13,309	2–0
3	October 9	@ San Antonio	W 111–97	Trey Murphy III (27)	Willy Hernangómez (11)	Devonte' Graham (6)	AT&T Center; 18,193	3–0
4	October 12	@ Miami	L 103–120	Willy Hernangómez (17)	Naji Marshall (8)	Williamson, McCollum, Marshall (4)	FTX Arena; 19,600	3–1
5	October 14	Atlanta	W 120–111	Brandon Ingram (19)	Jonas Valančiūnas (11)	Jonas Valančiūnas (7)	Legacy Arena; 12,787	4–1

2022–23 season schedule

=== Regular season ===
2022–23 game log
Total: 42–39 (Home: 27–14; Road: 15–25)
October: 4–2 (home: 1–1; road: 3–1)

Game	Date	Team	Score	High points	High rebounds	High assists	Location Attendance	Record
1	October 19	@ Brooklyn	W 130–108	Brandon Ingram (28)	Jonas Valančiūnas (15)	CJ McCollum (6)	Barclays Center; 18,003	1–0
2	October 21	@ Charlotte	W 124–112	Jonas Valančiūnas (30)	Jonas Valančiūnas (17)	Brandon Ingram (7)	Spectrum Center; 19,287	2–0
3	October 23	Utah	L 121–122 (OT)	CJ McCollum (28)	Murphy III, Valančiūnas (9)	CJ McCollum (12)	Smoothie King Center; 18,665	2–1
4	October 25	Dallas	W 113–111	Trey Murphy III (22)	Jonas Valančiūnas (7)	CJ McCollum (11)	Smoothie King Center; 14,020	3–1
5	October 28	@ Phoenix	L 111–124	Jonas Valančiūnas (25)	Jonas Valančiūnas (10)	CJ McCollum (9)	Footprint Center; 17,071	3–2
6	October 30	L.A. Clippers	W 112–91	CJ McCollum (22)	Zion Williamson (12)	Zion Williamson (7)	Crypto.com Arena; 18,142	4–2

November : 9–6 (home: 7–2; road: 2–4)

Game	Date	Team	Score	High points	High rebounds	High assists	Location Attendance	Record
7	November 2	@ L.A. Lakers	L 117–120 (OT)	Zion Williamson (27)	Jonas Valančiūnas (10)	CJ McCollum (8)	Crypto.com Arena; 18,997	4–3
8	November 4	Golden State	W 114–105	Brandon Ingram (26)	McCollum, Nance Jr. (8)	Ingram, McCollum (5)	Smoothie King Center; 18,451	5–3
9	November 5	@ Atlanta	L 121–124 (OT)	McCollum, Williamson (29)	Jonas Valančiūnas (17)	Brandon Ingram (7)	State Farm Arena; 17,654	5–4
10	November 7	@ Indiana	L 122–129	Brandon Ingram (29)	Valančiūnas, Williamson (7)	McCollum, Williamson (7)	Gainbridge Fieldhouse; 14,052	5–5
11	November 9	@ Chicago	W 115–111	Brandon Ingram (22)	Jonas Valančiuñas (13)	CJ McCollum (5)	United Center; 19,621	6–5
12	November 10	Portland	L 95–106	Zion Williamson (29)	Jonas Valančiuñas (11)	CJ McCollum (7)	Smoothie King Center; 14,289	6–6
13	November 12	Houston	W 119–106	Zion Williamson (26)	Larry Nance Jr. (9)	CJ McCollum (7)	Smoothie King Center; 15,367	7–6
14	November 15	Memphis	W 113–102	CJ McCollum (30)	Dyson Daniels (9)	CJ McCollum (9)	Smoothie King Center; 14,032	8–6
15	November 16	Chicago	W 124–110	CJ McCollum (23)	Trey Murphy III (10)	Brandon Ingram (9)	Smoothie King Center; 14,658	9–6
16	November 18	Boston	L 109–117	Brandon Ingram (25)	Larry Nance Jr. (8)	Brandon Ingram (7)	Smoothie King Center; 17,828	9–7
17	November 21	Golden State	W 128–83	Brandon Ingram (34)	Jonas Valančiuñas (13)	Naji Marshall (7)	Smoothie King Center; 18,589	10–7
18	November 23	@ San Antonio	W 129–110	Zion Williamson (32)	Zion Williamson (11)	Brandon Ingram (10)	AT&T Center; 14,947	11–7
19	November 25	@ Memphis	L 111–132	Trey Murphy III (21)	Daniels, Hernangómez, Jones, Williamson (5)	Dyson Daniels (6)	FedExForum; 17,794	11–8
20	November 28	Oklahoma City	W 105–101	Zion Williamson (23)	Jonas Valančiuñas (10)	Zion Williamson (8)	Smoothie King Center; 13,109	12–8
21	November 30	Toronto	W 126–108	Zion Williamson (33)	Jonas Valančiuñas (13)	Dyson Daniels (9)	Smoothie King Center; 14,845	13–8

December: 9–5 (home: 7–1; road: 2–4)

Game	Date	Team	Score	High points	High rebounds	High assists	Location Attendance	Record
22	December 2	@ San Antonio	W 117–99	Zion Williamson (30)	Zion Williamson (15)	Zion Williamson (8)	AT&T Center; 17,202	14–8
23	December 4	Denver	W 121–106	Jose Alvarado (38)	Willy Hernangómez (8)	Marshall, McCollum (6)	Smoothie King Center; 15,658	15–8
24	December 7	Detroit	W 104–98	Zion Williamson (29)	Jonas Valančiūnas (12)	Murphy III, Valančiūnas (5)	Smoothie King Center; 14,073	16–8
25	December 9	Phoenix	W 128–117	Zion Williamson (35)	Jonas Valančiūnas (10)	McCollum, Nance Jr. (5)	Smoothie King Center; 16,381	17–8
26	December 11	Phoenix	W 129–124 (OT)	Zion Williamson (35)	Jonas Valančiūnas (10)	Dyson Daniels (8)	Smoothie King Center; 18,681	18–8
27	December 13	@ Utah	L 100–121	Zion Williamson (26)	Zion Williamson (9)	Zion Williamson (5)	Vivint Arena; 18,206	18–9
28	December 15	@ Utah	L 129–132 (OT)	Zion Williamson (31)	Nance Jr., Valančiūnas (9)	Zion Williamson (8)	Vivint Arena; 18,206	18–10
29	December 17	@ Phoenix	L 114–118	Zion Williamson (30)	Jonas Valančiūnas (8)	Zion Williamson (9)	Footprint Center; 17,071	18–11
30	December 19	Milwaukee	L 119–128	Jonas Valančiūnas (37)	Jonas Valančiūnas (18)	CJ McCollum (9)	Smoothie King Center; 18,271	18–12
31	December 22	San Antonio	W 126–117	CJ McCollum (40)	Jonas Valančiūnas (10)	CJ McCollum (9)	Smoothie King Center; 16,417	19–12
32	December 23	@ Oklahoma City	W 128–125 (OT)	Trey Murphy III (23)	Naji Marshall (8)	CJ McCollum (11)	Paycom Center; 15,214	20–12
33	December 26	Indiana	W 113–93	Naji Marshall (22)	Jonas Valančiūnas (12)	CJ McCollum (6)	Smoothie King Center; 18,636	21–12
34	December 28	Minnesota	W 119–118	Zion Williamson (43)	Jonas Valančiūnas (11)	CJ McCollum (6)	Smoothie King Center; 18,669	22–12
35	December 30	Philadelphia	W 127–116	CJ McCollum (42)	Jonas Valančiūnas (9)	CJ McCollum (5)	Smoothie King Center; 18,656	23–12
36	December 31	@ Memphis	L 101–116	Zion Williamson (20)	Herbert Jones (11)	Naji Marshall (4)	FedExForum; 17,951	23–13

January : 3–13 (home: 1–5; road: 2–8)

Game	Date	Team	Score	High points	High rebounds	High assists	Location Attendance	Record
37	January 2	@ Philadelphia	L 111–120	McCollum, Williamson (26)	Jonas Valančiūnas (12)	Zion Williamson (7)	Wells Fargo Center; 20,531	23–14
38	January 4	Houston	W 119–108	CJ McCollum (28)	Jonas Valančiūnas (17)	CJ McCollum (6)	Smoothie King Center; 17,295	24–14
39	January 6	Brooklyn	L 102–108	CJ McCollum (28)	Jonas Valančiūnas (10)	CJ McCollum (6)	Smoothie King Center; 18,636	24–15
40	January 7	@ Dallas	L 117–127	Jonas Valančiūnas (25)	Hernangómez, Valančiūnas (10)	Jose Alvarado (7)	American Airlines Center; 20,300	24–16
41	January 9	@ Washington	W 132–112	CJ McCollum (34)	Jonas Valančiūnas (12)	Devonte' Graham (6)	Capital One Arena; 16,223	25–16
42	January 11	@ Boston	L 114–125	CJ McCollum (38)	Naji Marshall (7)	CJ McCollum (4)	TD Garden; 19,156	25–17
43	January 13	@ Detroit	W 116–110	Jonas Valančiūnas (33)	Jonas Valančiūnas (16)	CJ McCollum (9)	Little Caesars Arena; 18,989	26–17
44	January 16	@ Cleveland	L 103–113	CJ McCollum (25)	Jonas Valančiūnas (13)	Jose Alvarado (5)	Rocket Mortgage FieldHouse; 19,432	26–18
45	January 18	Miami	L 98–124	CJ McCollum (21)	Jonas Valančiūnas (10)	Larry Nance Jr. (6)	Smoothie King Center; 17,736	26–19
46	January 20	@ Orlando	L 110–123	CJ McCollum (23)	Jonas Valančiūnas (10)	Dyson Daniels (8)	Amway Center; 19,025	26–20
47	January 22	@ Miami	L 96–100	Trey Murphy III (17)	Jonas Valančiūnas (16)	Dyson Daniels (6)	Miami-Dade Arena; 19,600	26–21
48	January 24	Denver	L 98–99	CJ McCollum (20)	Jonas Valančiūnas (9)	CJ McCollum (4)	Smoothie King Center; 14,699	26–22
49	January 25	Minnesota	L 102–111	CJ McCollum (25)	Jonas Valančiūnas (12)	CJ McCollum (8)	Smoothie King Center; 14,887	26–23
50	January 28	Washington	L 103–113	CJ McCollum (24)	Larry Nance Jr. (8)	CJ McCollum (5)	Smoothie King Center; 17,692	26–24
51	January 29	@ Milwaukee	L 110–135	Jose Alvarado (18)	Larry Nance Jr. (12)	Alvarado, Marshall (6)	Fiserv Forum; 17,341	26–25
52	January 31	@ Denver	L 113–122	Jones, McCollum (21)	Larry Nance Jr. (11)	Brandon Ingram (9)	Ball Arena; 18,868	26–26

February : 4–6 (home: 3–2; road: 1–4)

Game	Date	Team	Score	High points	High rebounds	High assists	Location Attendance	Record
53	February 2	@ Dallas	L 106–111	Brandon Ingram (26)	Jonas Valančiūnas (13)	CJ McCollum (8)	American Airlines Center; 19,670	26–27
54	February 4	L.A. Lakers	W 131–126	Brandon Ingram (35)	Jonas Valančiūnas (14)	CJ McCollum (7)	Smoothie King Center; 18,886	27–27
55	February 5	Sacramento	W 136–104	Trey Murphy III (30)	Willy Hernangómez (16)	Hernangómez, Lewis Jr., Marshall, McCollum (4)	Smoothie King Center; 17,779	28–27
56	February 7	Atlanta	W 116–107	Brandon Ingram (30)	Jonas Valančiūnas (14)	Brandon Ingram (8)	Smoothie King Center; 16,669	29–27
57	February 10	Cleveland	L 107–118	Brandon Ingram (25)	Jonas Valančiūnas (7)	Brandon Ingram (8)	Smoothie King Center; 16,398	29–28
58	February 13	@ Oklahoma City	W 103–100	Brandon Ingram (34)	Jonas Valančiūnas (8)	Marshall, Nance Jr., Richardson (3)	Paycom Center; 14,920	30–28
59	February 15	@ L.A. Lakers	L 102–120	Brandon Ingram (25)	Hernangómez, Valančiūnas (11)	CJ McCollum (9)	Crypto.com Arena; 18,997	30–29
60	February 23	@ Toronto	L 110–115	Brandon Ingram (36)	Jonas Valančiūnas (12)	CJ McCollum (5)	Scotiabank Arena; 19,800	30–30
61	February 25	@ New York	L 106–128	Brandon Ingram (19)	Jonas Valančiūnas (10)	McCollum, Richardson (4)	Madison Square Garden; 19,812	30–31
62	February 27	Orlando	L 93–101	Brandon Ingram (25)	Ingram, Jones, Marshall (6)	CJ McCollum (6)	Smoothie King Center; 16,038	30–32

March : 9–6 (home: 4–2; road: 5–4)

Game	Date	Team	Score	High points	High rebounds	High assists	Location Attendance	Record
63	March 1	@ Portland	W 121–110	Brandon Ingram (40)	Hernangómez, McCollum (7)	CJ McCollum (7)	Moda Center; 18,566	31–32
64	March 2	@ Golden State	L 99–108	CJ McCollum (25)	Hernangómez, McCollum (6)	Jones, McCollum (5)	Chase Center; 18,064	31–33
65	March 6	@ Sacramento	L 108–123	Brandon Ingram (24)	Jonas Valančiūnas (12)	Herbert Jones (8)	Golden 1 Center; 17,708	31–34
66	March 8	Dallas	W 113–106	CJ McCollum (32)	Herbert Jones (9)	Daniels, Marshall (6)	Smoothie King Center; 17,473	32–34
67	March 11	Oklahoma City	L 96–110	CJ McCollum (26)	Hayes, Marshall (8)	CJ McCollum (8)	Smoothie King Center; 17,606	32–35
68	March 12	Portland	W 127–110	Trey Murphy III (41)	Jonas Valančiūnas (12)	CJ McCollum (11)	Smoothie King Center; 16,676	33–35
69	March 14	L.A. Lakers	L 108–123	Brandon Ingram (22)	Herbert Jones (7)	CJ McCollum (9)	Smoothie King Center; 18,625	33–36
70	March 17	@ Houston	L 112–114	Brandon Ingram (31)	Jonas Valančiūnas (17)	Ingram, McCollum (6)	Toyota Center; 15,841	33–37
71	March 19	@ Houston	W 117–107	Ingram, McCollum (26)	Jonas Valančiūnas (12)	CJ McCollum (9)	Toyota Center; 14,209	34–37
72	March 21	San Antonio	W 119–84	Brandon Ingram (32)	Jonas Valančiūnas (15)	Brandon Ingram (7)	Smoothie King Center; 15,466	35–37
73	March 23	Charlotte	W 115–96	Brandon Ingram (30)	Jonas Valančiūnas (19)	Brandon Ingram (10)	Smoothie King Center; 15,749	36–37
74	March 25	@ L.A. Clippers	W 131–110	Ingram, Murphy III (32)	Jonas Valančiūnas (13)	Brandon Ingram (13)	Crypto.com Arena; 17,702	37–37
75	March 27	@ Portland	W 124–90	Brandon Ingram (29)	Jonas Valančiūnas (21)	CJ McCollum (8)	Moda Center; 17,943	38–37
76	March 28	@ Golden State	L 109–120	Brandon Ingram (26)	Jonas Valančiūnas (9)	Brandon Ingram (7)	Chase Center; 18,064	38–38
77	March 30	@ Denver	W 107–88	Brandon Ingram (31)	Jonas Valančiūnas (12)	Brandon Ingram (10)	Ball Arena; 19,728	39–38

April : 3–2 (home: 3–1; road: 0–1)

Game	Date	Team	Score	High points	High rebounds	High assists	Location Attendance	Record
78	April 1	L.A. Clippers	W 122–114	Brandon Ingram (36)	Jonas Valančiūnas (12)	Brandon Ingram (8)	Smoothie King Center; 18,399	40–38
79	April 4	Sacramento	L 103–121	Brandon Ingram (22)	Jonas Valančiūnas (8)	Brandon Ingram (6)	Smoothie King Center; 15,799	40–39
80	April 5	Memphis	W 138–131 (OT)	Herbert Jones (35)	CJ McCollum (10)	Brandon Ingram (13)	Smoothie King Center; 17,232	41–39
81	April 7	New York	W 113–105	Trey Murphy III (31)	Jonas Valančiūnas (12)	Brandon Ingram (7)	Smoothie King Center; 18,656	42–39
82	April 9	@ Minnesota	L 108–113	Brandon Ingram (42)	Jonas Valančiūnas (18)	Brandon Ingram (7)	Target Center; 18,978	42–40

2022–23 season schedule

=== Play-in ===
2023 play-in game log
Total: 0–1 (Home: 0–1; Road: 0–0)
Play-In: 0–1 (home: 0–1; road: 0–0)

Game	Date	Team	Score	High points	High rebounds	High assists	Location Attendance	Record
1	April 12	Oklahoma City	L 118–123	Brandon Ingram (30)	Jonas Valančiūnas (18)	Brandon Ingram (7)	Smoothie King Center; 18,715	0–1

2022–23 season schedule

== Player statistics ==
Legend
GP	Games played	GS	Games started	MPG	Minutes per game
FG%	Field-goal percentage	3P%	3-point field-goal percentage	FT%	Free-throw percentage
RPG	Rebounds per game	APG	Assists per game	SPG	Steals per game
BPG	Blocks per game	PPG	Points per game

=== Regular season ===
New Orleans Pelicans statistics
Player	GP	GS	MPG	FG%	3P%	FT%	RPG	APG	SPG	BPG	PPG
Jonas Valančiūnas	79	79	24.9	.547	.349	.826	10.2	1.8	.3	.7	14.1
Trey Murphy III	79	65	31.0	.484	.406	.905	3.6	1.4	1.1	.5	14.5
Naji Marshall	77	21	23.3	.433	.303	.789	3.6	2.5	.7	.2	9.1
CJ McCollum	75	75	35.3	.437	.389	.769	4.4	5.7	.9	.5	20.9
Herbert Jones	66	66	29.6	.469	.335	.764	4.1	2.5	1.6	.6	9.8
Larry Nance Jr.	65	1	21.2	.610	.333	.696	5.4	1.8	.9	.6	6.8
Jose Alvarado	61	10	21.5	.411	.336	.813	2.3	3.0	1.1	.2	9.0
Dyson Daniels	59	11	17.7	.418	.314	.650	3.2	2.3	.7	.2	3.8
Devonte' Graham^{†}	53	0	15.3	.368	.347	.746	1.4	2.2	.6	.2	5.3
Jaxson Hayes	47	2	13.0	.551	.103	.699	2.8	.7	.4	.4	5.0
Brandon Ingram	45	45	34.2	.484	.390	.882	5.5	5.8	.7	.4	24.7
Willy Hernangómez	38	2	12.1	.527	.273	.779	4.7	.9	.4	.3	6.9
Zion Williamson	29	29	33.0	.608	.368	.714	7.0	4.6	1.1	.6	26.0
Kira Lewis Jr.	25	0	9.4	.455	.441	.864	1.3	.9	.4	.1	4.6
Garrett Temple	25	0	6.5	.400	.423	.750	.7	.5	.4	.1	2.0
Josh Richardson^{†}	23	4	23.2	.419	.384	.762	2.4	1.6	1.3	.4	7.5
Dereon Seabron	5	0	2.4	.400			.2	.0	.0	.0	.8

- ^{†} Denotes player spent time with another team in the season. Stats reflect time with the Pelicans only.

== Transactions ==
=== Free agents ===
==== Subtractions ====
Player	Reason left	New team	Ref.
Karlo Matković	Free agent	Cedevita Olimpija	
Jared Harper	Free agent	Valencia Basket	
