= Devonte' Graham =

American basketball player (born 1995)

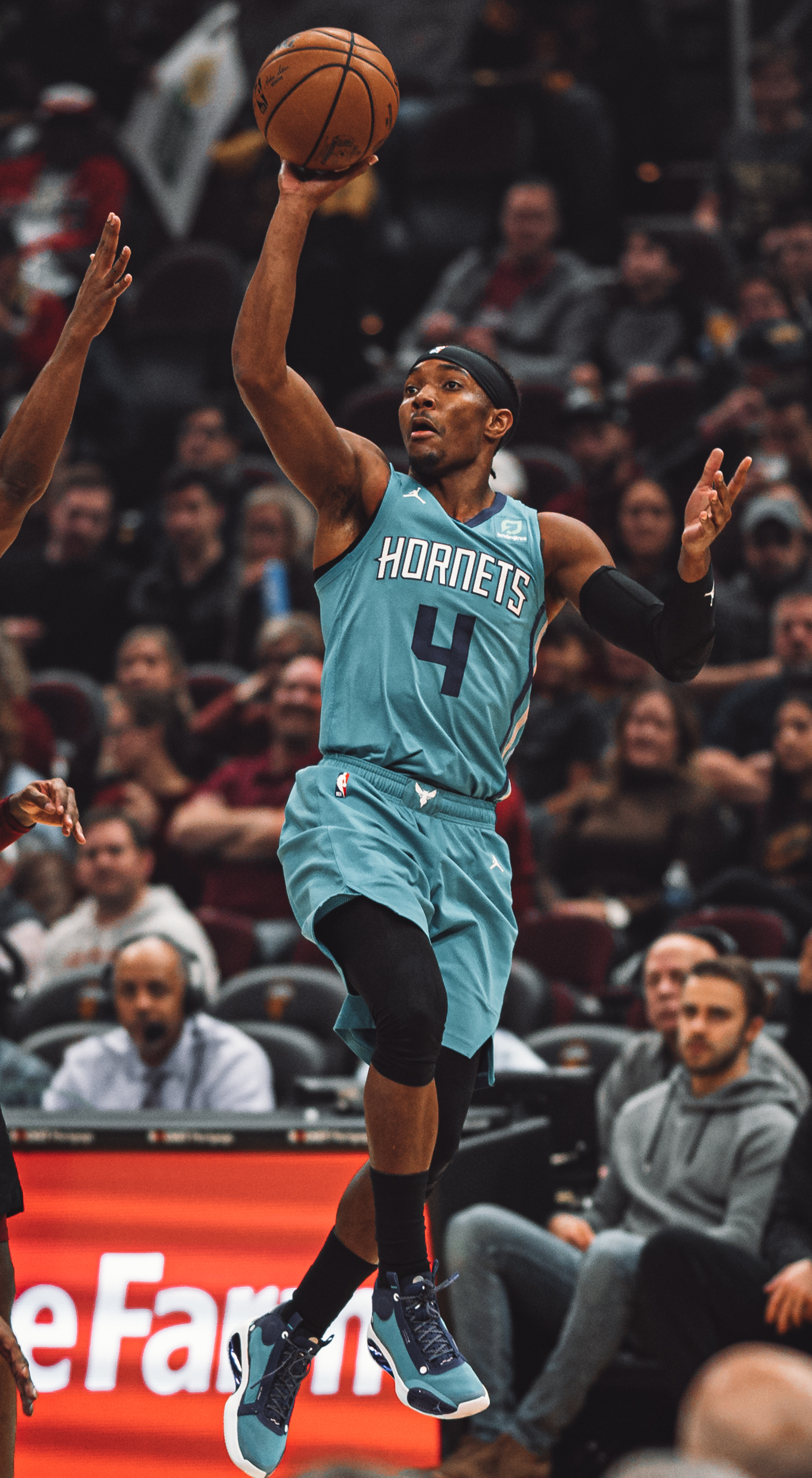
- Graham with the Charlotte Hornets in 2020

Free agent
- Position: Point guard

Personal information
- Born: February 22, 1995 (age 31) Raleigh, North Carolina, U.S.
- Listed height: 6 ft 1 in (1.85 m)
- Listed weight: 195 lb (88 kg)

Career information
- High school: Broughton (Raleigh, North Carolina); Brewster Academy (Wolfeboro, New Hampshire)
- College: Kansas (2014–2018)
- NBA draft: 2018: 2nd round, 34th overall pick
- Drafted by: Atlanta Hawks
- Playing career: 2018–present

Career history
- 2018–2021: Charlotte Hornets
- 2018–2019: →Greensboro Swarm
- 2021–2023: New Orleans Pelicans
- 2023–2024: San Antonio Spurs
- 2024–2025: South Bay Lakers
- 2025–2026: Crvena zvezda

Career highlights
- Consensus first-team All-American (2018); Big 12 Player of the Year (2018); First-team All-Big 12 (2018); Second-team All-Big 12 (2017); Big 12 All-Defensive Team (2016); Big 12 tournament MVP (2016)
- Stats at NBA.com
- Stats at Basketball Reference
Medals
Men's basketball
Representing United States
Summer Universiade
Gold medal – first place	2015 Gwangju	Team competition

Devonte' Terrell Graham (born February 22, 1995) is an American professional basketball player who last played for Crvena zvezda Meridianbet of the Basketball League of Serbia (KLS), the ABA League and the EuroLeague. He played college basketball for the Kansas Jayhawks and high school basketball for Needham Broughton High School.

== High school career ==
Graham attended Broughton High School in Raleigh, North Carolina. As a senior, Graham averaged 15.7 points and 5.4 assists per game, leading the team to a 26–6 record and the 4A state championship game during the 2012–13 season.

Graham originally committed to Appalachian State before deciding he wanted to play elsewhere. However, Appalachian State's head coach at the time, Jason Capel, would not allow him to de-commit, as he felt other teams may have been tampering with Graham following his commitment to the university. Due to this, Graham elected to play a post-graduate year at Brewster Academy, in Wolfeboro, New Hampshire, rather than honor his commitment to play for Appalachian State.

At Brewster Academy, Graham averaged 17.2 points and 5.0 assists per game, leading the team to the national prep championship and the New England championship during the 2013–14 season. On May 2, 2014, Graham committed to Kansas, choosing them over North Carolina State and Virginia.

== College career ==
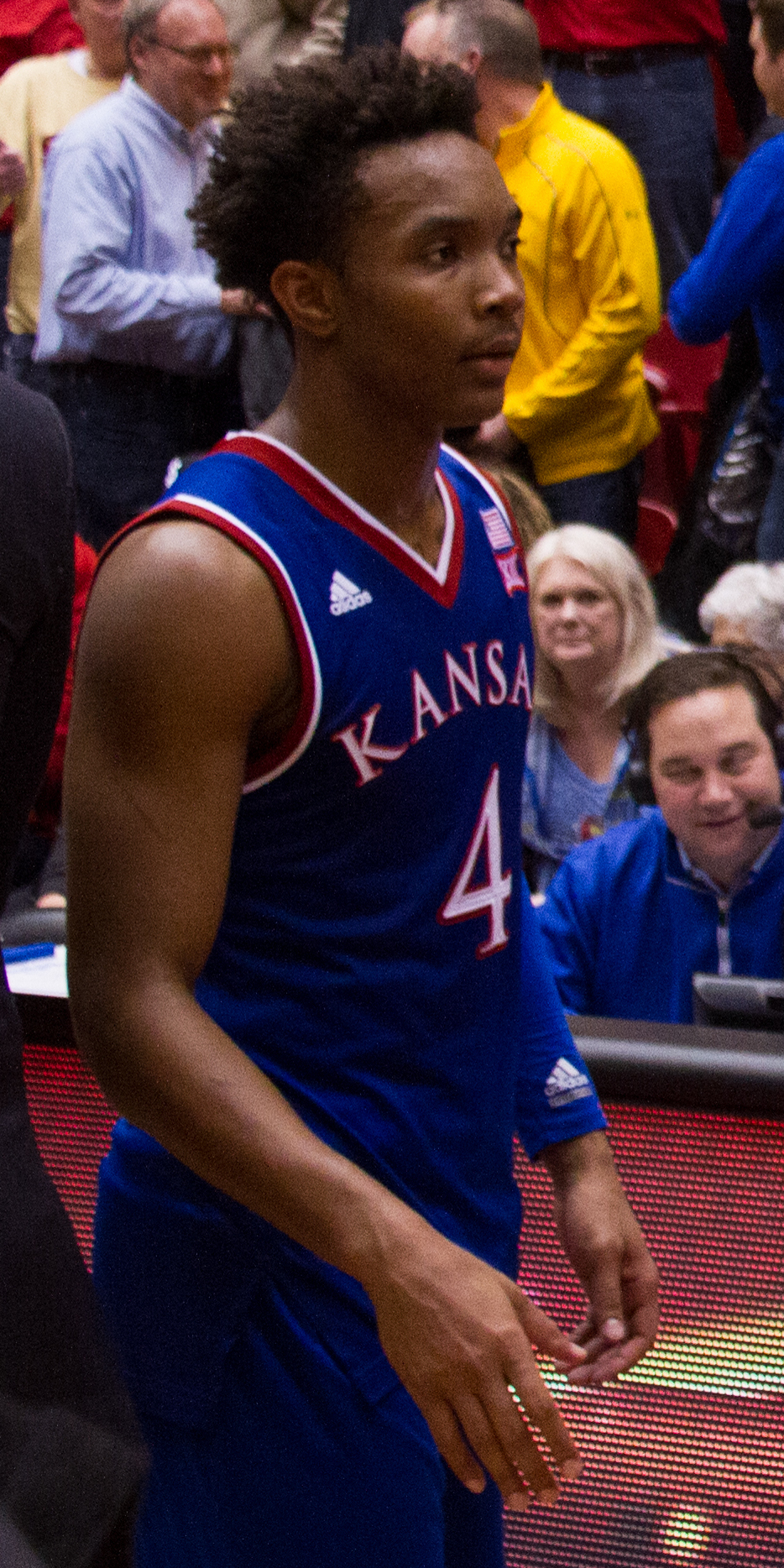
Graham with the Kansas Jayhawks in 2016

As a freshman at Kansas, Graham averaged 5.7 points and 2.1 assists per game. He had a season-high 20 points against TCU on February 21, 2015. In the NCAA Tournament, he scored 17 points against Wichita State.

After scoring a then career-high 27 points on 8-of-13 shooting against Oklahoma, Graham was named Big 12 Player of the Week for the week of February 14, 2016. At the conclusion of the regular season, Graham was named to the Big 12 All-Defensive Team. He was named MVP of the 2016 Big 12 men's basketball tournament after scoring 27 points against West Virginia in the championship game. As a sophomore in the 2015–16 season, Graham averaged 11.3 points per game while shooting 46 percent overall and 44 percent from 3 point territory.

As a junior, Graham was named to the Second Team All-Big 12. Along with Frank Mason III, Graham formed the backcourt of a Kansas team that went 31–5 but lost in the Elite Eight, as Graham shot 0 for 7 from the field and missed six 3-pointers in a season-ending 74–60 loss to Oregon. For the season, he averaged 13.4 points, 4.1 assists and 3.1 rebounds per game. In April, Graham announced on Twitter that he was returning for his senior year.

In his senior season, Graham was named the preseason Big 12 Player of the Year for the 2017–18 season. On November 28, Graham scored a career high 35 points in a 96–58 win over Toledo. The following game, a 76–60 win over Syracuse, Graham again scored 35 points. Graham would go on to be unanimously selected as the Big 12 Player of the Year, averaging 17.6 points and 7.2 assists per game as a senior. He was also named a consensus member of the First Team All-America by multiple organizations, leading his team to the 2017-18 Final Four in San Antonio, Texas. During his senior season, he averaged about 38 minutes a game.

== Professional career ==
=== Charlotte Hornets / Greensboro Swarm (2018–2021) ===
Graham was drafted in the 2nd round, 34th overall, of the 2018 NBA draft by the Atlanta Hawks before being traded to the Charlotte Hornets in exchange for two second round picks. In the Hornets' first three summer league games, he averaged ten points and six assists per contest. However, he would miss the rest of summer league with a knee injury. Graham made his NBA debut on October 22, 2018, against the Toronto Raptors, recording no points and one assist in five and a half minutes of play.

On October 23, 2019, Graham scored 23 points along with eight assists and four rebounds in a 126–125 win over the Chicago Bulls. Graham hit six three-pointers to help the Hornets set a new franchise record for three-point field goals made in a single game. On December 11, 2019, Graham scored a career-high 40 points with five rebounds and five assists in a 113–108 win over the Brooklyn Nets.

In the 2019-2020 NBA season Graham had his best season averaging 18.2 points per game, and 7.5 assists per game (8th most in the NBA) and finished 5th in the league’s most improved player voting.

Graham was featured on The Dodo's YouTube channel in June 2021, in a video about his basketball career and his life with his German Shepherd dog 'Charlotte', who is named after the Hornets.

=== New Orleans Pelicans (2021–2023) ===
On August 7, 2021, Graham was traded to the New Orleans Pelicans in a three-team trade involving the Memphis Grizzlies. He made his Pelicans debut on October 20, recording 18 points and five assists in a 117–97 loss to the Philadelphia 76ers. On November 26, Graham hit a game-winning three-pointer with 1.9 seconds left to give the Pelicans a 98–97 win over the Utah Jazz. On December 15, he hit a 61-foot, buzzer-beating shot to hoist the Pelicans to a 113–110 win over the Oklahoma City Thunder. The shot set the NBA record for the longest buzzer-beating game-winner in league history, beating out Mahmoud Abdul-Rauf's 55-foot shot in 1992 for the Denver Nuggets. On March 24, 2022, Graham scored a season-high 30 points, alongside two rebounds and four assists, in a 126–109 win over the Chicago Bulls. After a set of play-in tournament wins, the Pelicans qualified for the playoffs for the first time since 2018 and faced the Phoenix Suns during their first-round series. Graham made his playoff debut on April 17, playing ten minutes in a 110–99 Game 1 loss.

=== San Antonio Spurs (2023–2024) ===
On February 9, 2023, Graham was traded, alongside four second-round picks, to the San Antonio Spurs in exchange for Josh Richardson. Graham made his Spurs debut a day later, recording a season-high 31 points, three rebounds and three assists in a 138–131 double overtime loss to the Detroit Pistons. Graham's 31 points were also the most points scored in a debut in Spurs history.

On August 2, 2023, Graham was suspended for two games without pay for pleading guilty to a DWI charge.

On April 12, 2024, Graham put up a game-winner in a 121–120 win over the Denver Nuggets.

On July 6, 2024, Graham was traded back to the Charlotte Hornets alongside a future second-round pick in exchange for cap space, but was waived immediately. On July 31, he signed with the Portland Trail Blazers, but was waived on October 17 after appearing in two preseason games.

=== South Bay Lakers (2024–2025) ===
On December 13, 2024, Graham signed with the South Bay Lakers.

On February 11, 2025, Graham was traded to the Rip City Remix alongside Vincent Valerio-Bodon and future second-round pick in exchange for Stanley Johnson.

=== Crvena zvezda (2025–2026) ===
On August 1, 2025, Graham signed with Crvena zvezda of the Basketball League of Serbia (KLS), ABA League, and the EuroLeague. On January 31, 2026, Graham and the team agreed to mutually part ways.

== Career statistics ==
Legend
GP	Games played	GS	Games started	MPG	Minutes per game
FG%	Field goal percentage	3P%	3-point field goal percentage	FT%	Free throw percentage
RPG	Rebounds per game	APG	Assists per game	SPG	Steals per game
BPG	Blocks per game	PPG	Points per game	**Bold**	Career high

=== NBA ===
==== Regular season ====
Year	Team	GP	GS	MPG	FG%	3P%	FT%	RPG	APG	SPG	BPG	PPG
2018–19	Charlotte	46	3	14.7	.343	.281	.761	1.4	2.6	.5	.0	4.7
2019–20	Charlotte	63	53	**35.1**	**.382**	.373	.820	**3.4**	**7.5**	**1.0**	.2	**18.2**
2020–21	Charlotte	55	44	30.2	.377	**.375**	.842	2.7	5.4	.9	.1	14.8
2021–22	New Orleans	**76**	**63**	28.4	.363	.341	**.843**	2.3	4.2	.9	.2	11.9
2022–23	New Orleans	53	0	15.3	.368	.347	.746	1.4	2.2	.6	.2	5.3
2022–23	San Antonio	20	8	26.4	.380	.358	.750	2.5	4.0	.8	**.3**	13.0
2023–24	San Antonio	23	0	13.6	.352	.301	.813	1.6	2.1	.4	.1	5.0
Career		336	171	24.9	.371	.354	.812	2.3	4.3	.8	.2	11.1

==== Playoffs ====
Year	Team	GP	GS	MPG	FG%	3P%	FT%	RPG	APG	SPG	BPG	PPG
2022	New Orleans	6	0	10.0	.333	.357	.875	1.5	.7	.2	.2	4.0
Career		6	0	10.0	.333	.357	.875	1.5	.7	.2	.2	4.0

=== EuroLeague ===
Year	Team	GP	GS	MPG	FG%	3P%	FT%	RPG	APG	SPG	BPG	PPG	PIR
2025–26	Crvena zvezda	7	0	11.2	.233	.250	.200	1.3	1.1	0.3	0.1	3.0	0.9
Career		7	0	11.2	.233	.250	.200	1.3	1.1	.3	0.1	3.0	0.9

=== College ===
Year	Team	GP	GS	MPG	FG%	3P%	FT%	RPG	APG	SPG	BPG	PPG
2014–15	Kansas	29	0	17.8	.393	.425	.724	1.5	2.1	0.9	0.0	5.7
2015–16	Kansas	38	36	32.6	**.460**	**.441**	.744	3.3	3.7	1.4	0.1	11.3
2016–17	Kansas	36	36	35.3	.428	.388	.793	3.1	4.1	1.5	**0.2**	13.4
2017–18	Kansas	**39**	**39**	**37.8**	.400	.406	**.827**	**4.0**	**7.2**	**1.6**	0.1	**17.3**
Career		142	111	31.7	.422	.409	.787	3.1	4.5	1.4	0.1	12.3
