= 2022–23 Chicago Bulls season =

2022–23 NBA season by team

- Head coach: Billy Donovan
- President: Michael Reinsdorf
- General manager: Marc Eversley
- Owner: Jerry Reinsdorf
- Arena: United Center

Results
- Record: 40–42 (.488)
- Place: Division: 3rd (Central); Conference: 10th (Eastern)
- Playoff finish: Did not qualify
- Stats at Basketball Reference

Local media
- Television: NBC Sports Chicago
- Radio: WLS; WSCR

The 2022–23 Chicago Bulls season was the 57th season for the franchise in the National Basketball Association (NBA).

With a loss to the Indiana Pacers on March 5, the Bulls were not able to improve on their 46–36 record from their previous season. Instead, they finished with a struggling record of 40–42. However, it was good enough to qualify for the play-in tournament, having placed 10th in the Eastern Conference. They would defeat the Toronto Raptors in the first game after mounting a comeback from a 19-point deficit, but ended up losing to the Miami Heat in the second game, eliminating them from playoff contention for the 6th time in the past 7 seasons.

== Draft ==
Round	Pick	Player	Position(s)	Nationality	College
1	18	Dalen Terry	Shooting guard	United States	Arizona

The Bulls entered the draft with their own first-round pick. They traded their original second-round pick to the Detroit Pistons, which was later conveyed to the Sacramento Kings as the less favorable selection because Chicago finished with a better record than Detroit, before finally being traded to the Cleveland Cavaliers a few days before the draft.

== Roster ==
2022–23 Chicago Bulls roster
Players

Pos.	No.	Player	Height	Weight	DOB	From
G	2	Lonzo Ball (injured)	6 ft 6 in (1.98 m)	190 lb (86 kg)	1997-10-27	UCLA
G	21	Patrick Beverley	6 ft 1 in (1.85 m)	180 lb (82 kg)	1988-07-12	Arkansas
G	6	Alex Caruso	6 ft 5 in (1.96 m)	186 lb (84 kg)	1994-02-28	Texas A&M
F	11	DeMar DeRozan	6 ft 6 in (1.98 m)	220 lb (100 kg)	1989-08-07	USC
G	12	Ayo Dosunmu	6 ft 4 in (1.93 m)	200 lb (91 kg)	2000-01-17	Illinois
C	3	Andre Drummond	6 ft 11 in (2.11 m)	279 lb (127 kg)	1993-08-10	Connecticut
G/F	24	Javonte Green	6 ft 5 in (1.96 m)	205 lb (93 kg)	1993-07-23	Radford
G	22	Carlik Jones	6 ft 0 in (1.83 m)	174 lb (79 kg)	1997-12-23	Louisville
F	5	Derrick Jr. Jones	6 ft 6 in (1.98 m)	210 lb (95 kg)	1997-02-15	UNLV
G/F	8	Zach LaVine	6 ft 5 in (1.96 m)	200 lb (91 kg)	1995-03-10	UCLA
F	34	Justin Lewis (TW)	6 ft 8 in (2.03 m)	235 lb (107 kg)	2002-04-12	Marquette
F/C	19	Marko Simonović	7 ft 0 in (2.13 m)	220 lb (100 kg)	1999-10-15	Montenegro
F	32	Terry Taylor (TW)	6 ft 5 in (1.96 m)	230 lb (104 kg)	1999-09-23	Austin Peay
G/F	25	Dalen Terry	6 ft 7 in (2.01 m)	195 lb (88 kg)	2002-07-12	Arizona
C	9	Nikola Vučević	6 ft 10 in (2.08 m)	260 lb (118 kg)	1990-10-24	USC
G	0	Coby White	6 ft 5 in (1.96 m)	195 lb (88 kg)	2000-02-16	North Carolina
F	44	Patrick Williams	6 ft 7 in (2.01 m)	215 lb (98 kg)	2001-08-26	Florida State

Coaches
Head coach
- Billy Donovan
Assistant(s)
- John Bryant
- Maurice Cheeks
- Damian Cotter
- Chris Fleming
- Josh Longstaff
- Billy Schmidt

Legend
- (DP) Unsigned draft pick
- (FA) Free agent
- (S) Suspended
- (GL) On assignment to G League affiliate
- (TW) Two-way affiliate player
- Injured

Roster
Updated: March 29, 2023

== Standings ==
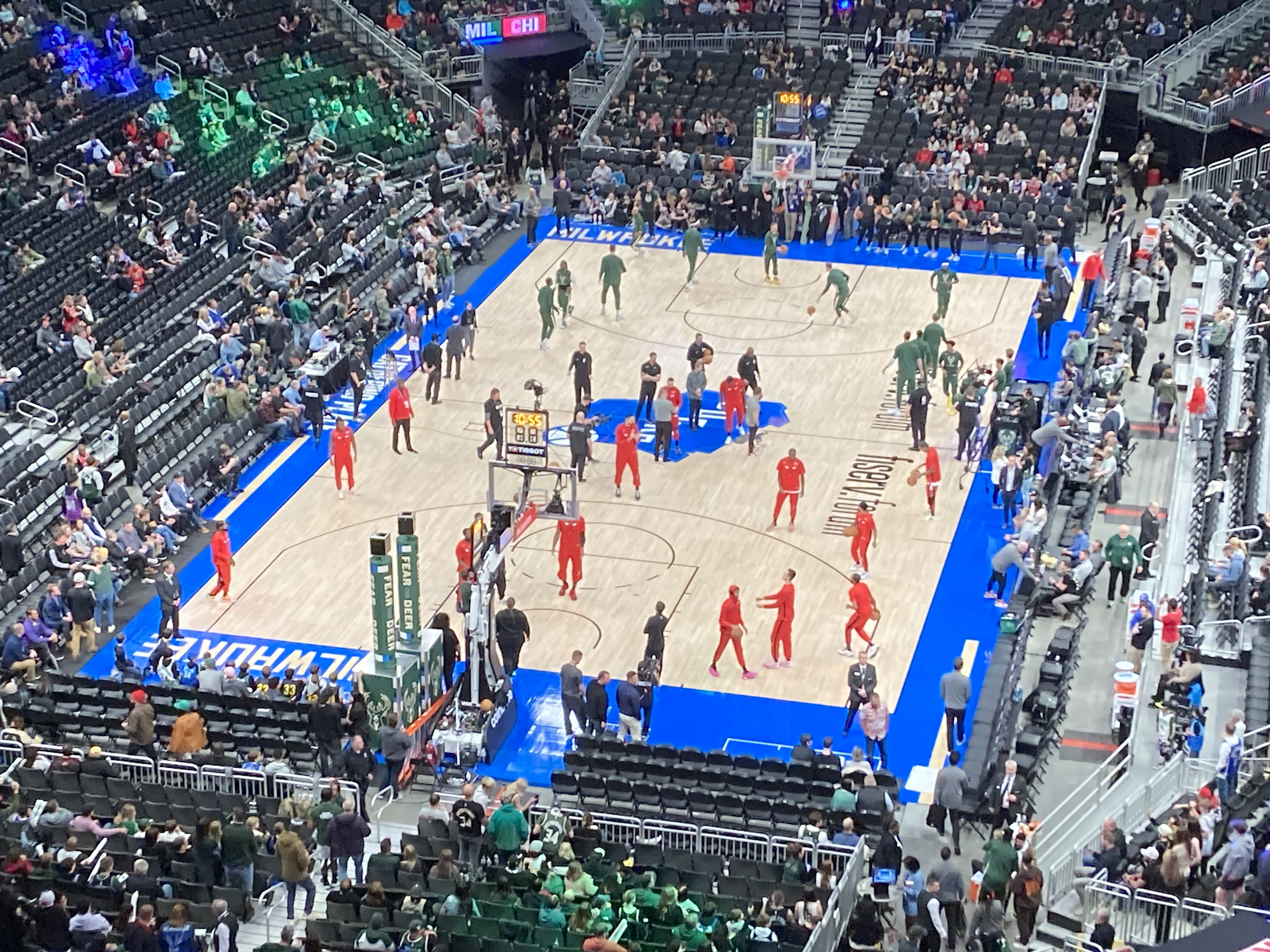
Chicago warming up before a game against the Milwaukee Bucks

=== Division ===
Central Division	W	L	PCT	GB	Home	Road	Div	GP
z – Milwaukee Bucks	58	24	.707	–	32‍–‍9	26‍–‍15	11–5	82
x – Cleveland Cavaliers	51	31	.622	7.0	31‍–‍10	20‍–‍21	13–3	82
pi – Chicago Bulls	40	42	.488	18.0	22‍–‍19	18‍–‍23	7–9	82
Indiana Pacers	35	47	.427	23.0	20‍–‍21	15‍–‍26	7–9	82
Detroit Pistons	17	65	.207	41.0	9‍–‍32	8‍–‍33	2–14	82

=== Conference ===
Eastern Conference
#	Team	W	L	PCT	GB	GP
1	z – Milwaukee Bucks *	58	24	.707	–	82
2	y – Boston Celtics *	57	25	.695	1.0	82
3	x – Philadelphia 76ers	54	28	.659	4.0	82
4	x – Cleveland Cavaliers	51	31	.622	7.0	82
5	x – New York Knicks	47	35	.573	11.0	82
6	x – Brooklyn Nets	45	37	.549	13.0	82
7	y – Miami Heat *	44	38	.537	14.0	82
8	x – Atlanta Hawks	41	41	.500	17.0	82
9	pi – Toronto Raptors	41	41	.500	17.0	82
10	pi – Chicago Bulls	40	42	.488	18.0	82
11	Indiana Pacers	35	47	.427	23.0	82
12	Washington Wizards	35	47	.427	23.0	82
13	Orlando Magic	34	48	.415	24.0	82
14	Charlotte Hornets	27	55	.329	31.0	82
15	Detroit Pistons	17	65	.207	41.0	82

Notes

z – Clinched home court advantage for the entire playoffs; y – Clinched division title; x – Clinched playoff spot; pi – Clinched play-in tournament spot; * – Division leader

== Game log ==
=== Preseason ===
2022 preseason game log
Total: 3–1 (Home: 2–1; Road: 1–0)
Preseason: 3–1 (home: 2–1; road: 1–0)

Game	Date	Team	Score	High points	High rebounds	High assists	Location Attendance	Record
1	October 4	New Orleans	L 125–129	DeMar DeRozan (21)	Nikola Vučević (11)	Carlik Jones (4)	United Center; 16,322	0–1
2	October 7	Denver	W 131–113	DeMar DeRozan (22)	Nikola Vučević (7)	Zach LaVine (6)	United Center; 20,305	1–1
3	October 9	@ Toronto	W 115–98	DeMar DeRozan (21)	Vučević, Drummond (9)	DeMar DeRozan (8)	Scotiabank Arena; 16,559	2–1
4	October 11	Milwaukee	W 127–104	Patrick Williams (22)	Nikola Vučević (11)	Alex Caruso (9)	United Center; 19,356	3–1

2022–23 preseason schedule

=== Regular season ===
2022–23 game log
Total: 40–42 (Home: 22–19; Road: 18–23)
October: 3–4 (home: 2–2; road: 1–2)

Game	Date	Team	Score	High points	High rebounds	High assists	Location Attendance	Record
1	October 19	@ Miami	W 116–108	DeMar DeRozan (37)	Nikola Vučević (17)	DeMar DeRozan (9)	FTX Arena; 19,600	1–0
2	October 21	@ Washington	L 100–102	DeMar DeRozan (32)	Andre Drummond (10)	DeMar DeRozan (6)	Capital One Arena; 20,476	1–1
3	October 22	Cleveland	L 96–128	Zach LaVine (23)	Andre Drummond (7)	Zach LaVine (4)	United Center; 21,089	1–2
4	October 24	Boston	W 120–102	DeMar DeRozan (25)	Nikola Vučević (23)	Goran Dragić (6)	United Center; 17,673	2–2
5	October 26	Indiana	W 124–109	Zach LaVine (28)	Andre Drummond (13)	Ayo Dosunmu (7)	United Center; 18,306	3–2
6	October 28	@ San Antonio	L 124–129	DeMar DeRozan (33)	Andre Drummond (14)	Goran Dragić (5)	AT&T Center; 16,562	3–3
7	October 29	Philadelphia	L 109–114	DeMar DeRozan (24)	Nikola Vučević (19)	Alex Caruso (6)	United Center; 19,010	3–4

November : 6–8 (home: 3–3; road: 3–5)

Game	Date	Team	Score	High points	High rebounds	High assists	Location Attendance	Record
8	November 1	@ Brooklyn	W 108–99	Zach LaVine (29)	Nikola Vučević (15)	Zach LaVine (5)	Barclays Center; 17,732	4–4
9	November 2	Charlotte	W 106–88	Javonte Green (17)	Nikola Vučević (13)	Zach LaVine (6)	United Center; 17,886	5–4
10	November 4	@ Boston	L 119–123	DeMar DeRozan (46)	Nikola Vučević (12)	DeMar DeRozan (5)	TD Garden; 19,156	5–5
11	November 6	@ Toronto	L 104–113	DeMar DeRozan (20)	Nikola Vučević (12)	Alex Caruso (11)	Scotiabank Arena; 19,800	5–6
12	November 7	Toronto	W 111–97	Zach LaVine (30)	Nikola Vučević (13)	DeMar DeRozan (7)	United Center; 21,142	6–6
13	November 9	New Orleans	L 111–115	DeMar DeRozan (33)	Nikola Vučević (7)	Goran Dragić (6)	United Center; 19,621	6–7
14	November 13	Denver	L 103–126	Zach LaVine (21)	Andre Drummond (11)	Goran Dragić (6)	United Center; 21,602	6–8
15	November 16	@ New Orleans	L 110–124	DeMar DeRozan (28)	Nikola Vučević (10)	DeRozan, Dragić (7)	Smoothie King Center; 14,658	6–9
16	November 18	Orlando	L 107–108	DeMar DeRozan (41)	Nikola Vučević (16)	Nikola Vučević (7)	United Center; 21,031	6–10
17	November 21	Boston	W 121–107	DeMar DeRozan (28)	Nikola Vučević (13)	Nikola Vučević (6)	United Center; 20,786	7–10
18	November 23	@ Milwaukee	W 118–113	DeMar DeRozan (36)	Andre Drummond (8)	DeMar DeRozan (8)	Fiserv Forum; 17,341	8–10
19	November 25	@ Oklahoma City	L 119–123 (OT)	DeMar DeRozan (30)	Nikola Vučević (13)	DeMar DeRozan (6)	Paycom Center; 16,082	8–11
20	November 28	@ Utah	W 114–107	DeMar DeRozan (26)	Andre Drummond (10)	DeMar DeRozan (6)	Vivint Arena; 18,206	9–11
21	November 30	@ Phoenix	L 113–132	DeMar DeRozan (29)	Nikola Vučević (8)	Zach LaVine (7)	Footprint Center; 17,071	9–12

December: 7–8 (home: 4–4; road: 3–4)

Game	Date	Team	Score	High points	High rebounds	High assists	Location Attendance	Record
22	December 2	@ Golden State	L 111–119	Nikola Vučević (23)	Nikola Vučević (11)	DeMar DeRozan (7)	Chase Center; 18,064	9–13
23	December 4	@ Sacramento	L 101–110	Zach LaVine (41)	Zach LaVine (8)	Caruso, DeRozan (4)	Golden 1 Center; 17,611	9–14
24	December 7	Washington	W 115–111	DeMar DeRozan (27)	Nikola Vučević (11)	Alex Caruso (9)	United Center; 19,265	10–14
25	December 10	Dallas	W 144–115	DeMar DeRozan (28)	DeMar DeRozan (9)	Coby White (7)	United Center; 19,528	11–14
26	December 11	@ Atlanta	L 122–123 (OT)	DeMar DeRozan (34)	DeMar DeRozan (13)	DeMar DeRozan (8)	State Farm Arena; 17,227	11–15
27	December 14	New York	L 120–128 (OT)	DeMar DeRozan (32)	Nikola Vučević (7)	Caruso, Vučević, Williams (5)	United Center; 18,820	11–16
28	December 16	New York	L 91–114	Zach LaVine (17)	Nikola Vučević (8)	Caruso, DeRozan, Vučević (4)	United Center; 19,661	11–17
29	December 18	@ Minnesota	L 126–150	DeMar DeRozan (29)	Nikola Vučević (9)	DeRozan, LaVine (6)	Target Center; 16,294	11–18
30	December 20	@ Miami	W 113–103	Nikola Vučević (29)	Nikola Vučević (12)	Zach LaVine (7)	FTX Arena; 19,969	12–18
31	December 21	@ Atlanta	W 110–108	DeMar DeRozan (28)	Andre Drummond (11)	DeRozan, LaVine, White (5)	State Farm Arena; 17,226	13–18
32	December 23	@ New York	W 118–117	Zach LaVine (33)	Nikola Vučević (12)	DeMar DeRozan (10)	Madison Square Garden; 19,812	14–18
33	December 26	Houston	L 118–133	DeMar DeRozan (31)	Andre Drummond (9)	DeMar DeRozan (9)	United Center; 21,561	14–19
34	December 28	Milwaukee	W 119–113 (OT)	DeMar DeRozan (42)	Nikola Vučević (14)	DeRozan, Vučević (5)	United Center; 21,537	15–19
35	December 30	Detroit	W 132–118	Zach LaVine (43)	Nikola Vučević (9)	Zach LaVine (6)	United Center; 21,667	16–19
36	December 31	Cleveland	L 102–103	DeMar DeRozan (21)	Nikola Vučević (14)	Caruso, DeRozan (3)	United Center; 21,524	16–20

January: 7–7 (home: 4–2; road: 3–5)

Game	Date	Team	Score	High points	High rebounds	High assists	Location Attendance	Record
37	January 2	@ Cleveland	L 134–145 (OT)	DeMar DeRozan (44)	Nikola Vučević (13)	Zach LaVine (6)	Rocket Mortgage FieldHouse; 19,432	16–21
38	January 4	Brooklyn	W 121–112	DeRozan, Williams (22)	Nikola Vučević (13)	Goran Dragić (6)	United Center; 21,418	17–21
39	January 6	@ Philadelphia	W 126–112	Zach LaVine (41)	Nikola Vučević (18)	Nikola Vučević (10)	Wells Fargo Center; 20,766	18–21
40	January 7	Utah	W 126–118	Zach LaVine (36)	Nikola Vučević (16)	DeMar DeRozan (7)	United Center; 21,694	19–21
41	January 9	@ Boston	L 99–107	Zach LaVine (27)	Nikola Vučević (13)	Zach LaVine (6)	TD Garden; 19,156	19–22
42	January 11	@ Washington	L 97–100	Zach LaVine (38)	Nikola Vučević (10)	Nikola Vučević (5)	Capital One Arena; 17,032	19–23
43	January 13	Oklahoma City	L 110–124	Zach LaVine (25)	Nikola Vučević (11)	Coby White (6)	United Center; 21,342	19–24
44	January 15	Golden State	W 132–118	Nikola Vučević (43)	Nikola Vučević (13)	Alex Caruso (7)	United Center; 20,139	20–24
45	January 19	@ Detroit	W 126–108	Zach LaVine (30)	Nikola Vučević (15)	Nikola Vučević (6)	(France) Accor Arena; 15,885	21–24
46	January 23	Atlanta	W 111–100	DeMar DeRozan (26)	Nikola Vučević (17)	Nikola Vučević (7)	United Center; 20,938	22–24
47	January 24	@ Indiana	L 110–116	DeMar DeRozan (33)	Nikola Vučević (8)	Nikola Vučević (5)	Gainbridge Fieldhouse; 16,102	22–25
48	January 26	@ Charlotte	L 96–111	DeMar DeRozan (28)	LaVine, Vučević (9)	DeMar DeRozan (5)	Spectrum Center; 17,697	22–26
49	January 28	@ Orlando	W 128–109	DeRozan, LaVine (32)	Nikola Vučević (13)	DeMar DeRozan (8)	Amway Center; 18,846	23–26
50	January 31	L.A. Clippers	L 103–108	Nikola Vučević (23)	LaVine, Vučević (14)	Zach LaVine (8)	United Center; 20,068	23–27

February: 5–7 (home: 5–2; road: 0–5)

Game	Date	Team	Score	High points	High rebounds	High assists	Location Attendance	Record
51	February 2	Charlotte	W 114–98	Ayo Dosunmu (22)	Nikola Vučević (12)	DeMar DeRozan (7)	United Center; 20,072	24–27
52	February 4	Portland	W 129–121	Zach LaVine (36)	Nikola Vučević (11)	DeRozan, Dragić (7)	United Center; 20,135	25–27
53	February 6	San Antonio	W 128–104	Nikola Vučević (22)	Andre Drummond (15)	DeMar DeRozan (5)	United Center; 19,291	26–27
54	February 7	@ Memphis	L 89–104	Nikola Vučević (28)	Nikola Vučević (17)	Dosunmu, Vučević (6)	FedExForum; 17,012	26–28
55	February 9	@ Brooklyn	L 105–116	Zach LaVine (38)	Nikola Vučević (17)	DeMar DeRozan (6)	Barclays Center; 16,938	26–29
56	February 11	@ Cleveland	L 89–97	Zach LaVine (23)	Nikola Vučević (14)	Ayo Dosunmu (8)	Rocket Mortgage FieldHouse; 19,432	26–30
57	February 13	Orlando	L 91–100	Zach LaVine (26)	Nikola Vučević (13)	DeMar DeRozan (6)	United Center; 20,767	26–31
58	February 15	@ Indiana	L 113–117	Zach LaVine (35)	Zach LaVine (11)	Zach LaVine (7)	Gainbridge Fieldhouse; 15,599	26–32
59	February 16	Milwaukee	L 100–112	Nikola Vučević (22)	Nikola Vučević (16)	Dalen Terry (6)	United Center; 20,308	26–33
60	February 24	Brooklyn	W 131–87	Zach LaVine (32)	Drummond, Vučević (10)	Beverley, DeRozan, White (4)	United Center; 21,286	27–33
61	February 26	Washington	W 102–82	DeMar DeRozan (29)	Nikola Vučević (13)	DeMar DeRozan (6)	United Center; 21,106	28–33
62	February 28	@ Toronto	L 98–104	Nikola Vučević (23)	Andre Drummond (10)	Alex Caruso (6)	Scotiabank Arena; 19,800	28–34

March : 9–6 (home: 2–5; road: 7–1)

Game	Date	Team	Score	High points	High rebounds	High assists	Location Attendance	Record
63	March 1	@ Detroit	W 117–115	Zach LaVine (41)	Patrick Beverley (10)	Patrick Beverley (10)	Little Caesars Arena; 18,098	29–34
64	March 3	Phoenix	L 104–125	DeMar DeRozan (31)	Nikola Vučević (9)	DeMar DeRozan (6)	United Center; 21,169	29–35
65	March 5	Indiana	L 122–125	Zach LaVine (42)	Nikola Vučević (9)	Nikola Vučević (5)	United Center; 21,225	29–36
66	March 8	@ Denver	W 117–96	Zach LaVine (29)	Nikola Vučević (15)	DeMar DeRozan (8)	Ball Arena; 19,896	30–36
67	March 11	@ Houston	W 119–111	Zach LaVine (36)	Nikola Vučević (12)	Nikola Vučević (6)	Toyota Center; 18,055	31–36
68	March 15	Sacramento	L 114–117	DeMar DeRozan (33)	Nikola Vučević (14)	Zach LaVine (6)	United Center; 21,886	31–37
69	March 17	Minnesota	W 139–131 (2OT)	DeMar DeRozan (49)	DeMar DeRozan (14)	Zach LaVine (5)	United Center; 20,109	32–37
70	March 18	Miami	W 113–99	DeMar DeRozan (24)	Nikola Vučević (10)	DeMar DeRozan (10)	United Center; 20,094	33–37
71	March 20	@ Philadelphia	W 109–105 (2OT)	Zach LaVine (26)	Nikola Vučević (12)	Zach LaVine (7)	Wells Fargo Center; 21,145	34–37
72	March 22	Philadelphia	L 91–116	Coby White (19)	Andre Drummond (12)	Dosunmu, LaVine (4)	United Center; 20,946	34–38
73	March 24	@ Portland	W 124–96	Zach LaVine (33)	Nikola Vučević (15)	Coby White (9)	Moda Center; 19,393	35–38
74	March 26	@ L.A. Lakers	W 118–108	Zach LaVine (32)	Andre Drummond (8)	DeMar DeRozan (10)	Crypto.com Arena; 18,997	36–38
75	March 27	@ L.A. Clippers	L 112–124	Zach LaVine (23)	Drummond, Vučević (8)	DeMar DeRozan (7)	Crypto.com Arena; 19,068	36–39
76	March 29	L.A. Lakers	L 110–121	Nikola Vučević (29)	Nikola Vučević (12)	Coby White (9)	United Center; 21,739	36–40
77	March 31	@ Charlotte	W 121–91	DeRozan, LaVine (23)	Andre Drummond (11)	Coby White (7)	Spectrum Center; 18,768	37–40

April: 3–2 (home: 2–1; road: 1–1)

Game	Date	Team	Score	High points	High rebounds	High assists	Location Attendance	Record
78	April 2	Memphis	W 128–107	Zach LaVine (36)	Nikola Vučević (10)	Zach LaVine (9)	United Center; 20,944	38–40
79	April 4	Atlanta	L 105–123	Zach LaVine (26)	Nikola Vučević (10)	Zach LaVine (6)	United Center; 21,717	38–41
80	April 5	@ Milwaukee	L 92–105	Nikola Vučević (21)	Nikola Vučević (11)	Beverley, LaVine (7)	Fiserv Forum; 17,679	38–42
81	April 7	@ Dallas	W 115–112	Coby White (24)	Nikola Vučević (10)	Coby White (11)	American Airlines Center; 20,313	39–42
82	April 9	Detroit	W 103–81	Zach LaVine (17)	Andre Drummond (10)	DeMar DeRozan (5)	United Center; 21,530	40–42

2022–23 season schedule

=== Play-in ===
With the April 4, 2023 Orlando Magic loss to the Cleveland Cavaliers, the Bulls qualified into the play-in tournament.

2023 play-in game log
Total: 1–1 (Home: 0–0; Road: 1–1)
Play-in: 1–1 (home: 0–0; road: 1–1)

Game	Date	Team	Score	High points	High rebounds	High assists	Location Attendance	Record
1	April 12	@ Toronto	W 109–105	Zach LaVine (39)	Nikola Vučević (13)	Coby White (5)	Scotiabank Arena; 19,800	1–0
2	April 14	@ Miami	L 91–102	DeMar DeRozan (26)	Nikola Vučević (9)	DeMar DeRozan (9)	Kaseya Center; 19,678	1–1

2022–23 season schedule

== Player statistics ==
Player	Pos.	GP	GS	MP	Reb.	Ast.	Stl.	Blk.	Pts.
Patrick Beverley^{≠}	PG	22	22	605	107	76	23	16	127
Tony Bradley^{‡}	C	12	0	33	11	1	1	1	19
Alex Caruso	PG	67	36	1,575	196	193	98	46	374
DeMar DeRozan	SF	74	74	2,682	343	377	83	36	1,816
Ayo Dosunmu	G	80	51	2,098	220	206	62	26	687
Goran Dragić^{‡}	PG	51	0	787	69	139	11	4	326
Andre Drummond	C	67	0	849	444	33	45	27	399
Javonte Green	SG/PG	32	1	480	88	23	24	21	165
Malcolm Hill^{‡}	SG/SF	5	0	9	3	0	0	0	5
Carlik Jones	G	7	0	56	5	6	2	0	20
Derrick Jones Jr.	SF	64	0	893	153	34	29	37	319
Zach LaVine	SG	77	77	2,768	345	327	69	18	1,913
Marko Simonović	C	7	0	20	2	0	0	0	6
Terry Taylor^{≠}	PF	5	0	36	8	0	0	1	20
Dalen Terry	G	38	0	214	37	22	11	5	85
Nikola Vučević	C	82	82	2,746	903	265	60	57	1,447
Coby White	PG	74	2	1,730	212	204	54	6	715
Patrick Williams	PF	82	65	2,323	327	100	72	70	833

After all games.
^{‡}Waived during the season
^{†}Traded during the season
^{≠}Acquired during the season

== Transactions ==
=== Free agency ===
==== Re-signed ====
Player	Signed	Ref.
July 6	Derrick Jones Jr.	
July 7	Zach LaVine	

==== Additions ====
Date	Player	Former team	Ref.
July 6	Andre Drummond	Brooklyn Nets	
August 2	Goran Dragić	Brooklyn Nets	
October 14	Kostas Antetokounmpo	ASVEL	

==== Subtractions ====
Date	Player	Reason left	New team	Ref.
July 1	Troy Brown Jr.	Free agent	Los Angeles Lakers	
