= 2022–23 San Antonio Spurs season =

- Head coach: Gregg Popovich
- President: Gregg Popovich; Brent Barry (vice)
- General manager: Brian Wright
- Owner: Peter Holt
- Arena: AT&T Center

Results
- Record: 22–60 (.268)
- Place: Division: 5th (Southwest); Conference: 15th (Western)
- Playoff finish: Did not qualify
- Stats at Basketball Reference

Local media
- Television: Bally Sports Southwest, KENS, KMYS; KNIC (Spanish)
- Radio: 1200 WOAI

The 2022–23 San Antonio Spurs season was the 56th season of the franchise, its 47th in the National Basketball Association (NBA), and its 50th in the San Antonio area. This was also the first season that the Spurs also played select home games at the Moody Center in Austin, Texas, hosting the Portland Trail Blazers and Minnesota Timberwolves on April 6 and 8, 2023, respectively.

On March 7, 2023, the Spurs were eliminated from playoff contention for the fourth consecutive season with the Oklahoma City Thunder's win over the Golden State Warriors and the Dallas Mavericks' win over the Utah Jazz. The Spurs also had their worst season since the 1996–97 season where they went 20–62, finishing last in the West.

== Draft ==
Round	Pick	Player	Position	Nationality	School/club team
1	9	Jeremy Sochan	Power forward	Poland	Baylor
1	20	Malaki Branham	Shooting guard	United States	Ohio State
1	25	Blake Wesley	Point guard	United States	Notre Dame
2	38	Kennedy Chandler	Point guard	United States	Tennessee

The Spurs held three first-round picks and one second-round pick entering the draft.

== Roster ==
2022–23 San Antonio Spurs roster
Players

Pos.	No.	Player	Height	Weight	DOB	From
F	26	Dominick Barlow (TW)	6 ft 9 in (2.06 m)	215 lb (98 kg)	2003-05-26	Dumont HS (NJ)
F/C	28	Charles Bassey (injured)	6 ft 9 in (2.06 m)	230 lb (104 kg)	2000-10-28	Western Kentucky
F	31	Keita Bates-Diop	6 ft 8 in (2.03 m)	229 lb (104 kg)	1996-01-23	Ohio State
C	92	Khem Birch (injured)	6 ft 8 in (2.03 m)	233 lb (106 kg)	1992-09-28	UNLV
G/F	22	Malaki Branham	6 ft 4 in (1.93 m)	180 lb (82 kg)	2003-05-12	Ohio State
G/F	30	Julian Champagnie (TW)	6 ft 9 in (2.06 m)	217 lb (98 kg)	2001–06–29	St. John's
F/C	23	Zach Collins	6 ft 11 in (2.11 m)	250 lb (113 kg)	1997-11-19	Gonzaga
C	41	Gorgui Dieng	6 ft 10 in (2.08 m)	248 lb (112 kg)	1990-01-18	Louisville
G	4	Devonte' Graham	6 ft 1 in (1.85 m)	195 lb (88 kg)	1995-02-22	Kansas
G/F	3	Keldon Johnson	6 ft 5 in (1.96 m)	220 lb (100 kg)	1999-10-11	Kentucky
G	33	Tre Jones	6 ft 1 in (1.85 m)	185 lb (84 kg)	2000-01-08	Duke
G/F	35	Romeo Langford (injured)	6 ft 5 in (1.96 m)	216 lb (98 kg)	1999-10-25	Indiana
F/C	54	Sandro Mamukelashvili	6 ft 10 in (2.08 m)	240 lb (109 kg)	1999-05-23	Seton Hall
F	17	Doug McDermott	6 ft 6 in (1.98 m)	225 lb (102 kg)	1992-01-03	Creighton
F	10	Jeremy Sochan (injured)	6 ft 8 in (2.03 m)	230 lb (104 kg)	2003-05-20	Baylor
G/F	24	Devin Vassell	6 ft 5 in (1.96 m)	200 lb (91 kg)	2000-08-23	Florida State
G	14	Blake Wesley	6 ft 4 in (1.93 m)	185 lb (84 kg)	2003-03-16	Notre Dame

Coaches
Head coach
- Gregg Popovich
Assistant(s)
- Brett Brown
- Mitch Johnson
- Matthew Nielsen
- Darius Songaila

Legend
- (DP) Unsigned draft pick
- (FA) Free agent
- (S) Suspended
- (GL) On assignment to G League affiliate
- (TW) Two-way affiliate player
- Injured

Roster
Updated: December 5, 2024

== Standings ==
=== Division ===
Southwest Division	W	L	PCT	GB	Home	Road	Div	GP
y – Memphis Grizzlies	51	31	.622	–	35‍–‍6	16‍–‍25	13–3	82
pi – New Orleans Pelicans	42	40	.512	9.0	27‍–‍14	15‍–‍26	11–5	82
Dallas Mavericks	38	44	.463	13.0	23‍–‍18	15‍–‍26	9–7	82
Houston Rockets	22	60	.268	29.0	14‍–‍27	8‍–‍33	4–12	82
San Antonio Spurs	22	60	.268	29.0	14‍–‍27	8‍–‍33	3–13	82

=== Conference ===
Western Conference
#	Team	W	L	PCT	GB	GP
1	c – Denver Nuggets *	53	29	.646	–	82
2	y – Memphis Grizzlies *	51	31	.622	2.0	82
3	y – Sacramento Kings *	48	34	.585	5.0	82
4	x – Phoenix Suns	45	37	.549	8.0	82
5	x – Los Angeles Clippers	44	38	.537	9.0	82
6	x – Golden State Warriors	44	38	.537	9.0	82
7	x – Los Angeles Lakers	43	39	.524	10.0	82
8	x – Minnesota Timberwolves	42	40	.512	11.0	82
9	pi – New Orleans Pelicans	42	40	.512	11.0	82
10	pi – Oklahoma City Thunder	40	42	.488	13.0	82
11	Dallas Mavericks	38	44	.463	15.0	82
12	Utah Jazz	37	45	.451	16.0	82
13	Portland Trail Blazers	33	49	.402	20.0	82
14	Houston Rockets	22	60	.268	31.0	82
15	San Antonio Spurs	22	60	.268	31.0	82

== Game log ==
=== Preseason ===
2022 preseason game log
Total: 1–4 (Home: 0–3; Road: 1–1)
Preseason: 1–4 (home: 0–3; road: 1–1)

Game	Date	Team	Score	High points	High rebounds	High assists	Location Attendance	Record
1	October 2	@ Houston	L 96–134	Devin Vassell (13)	Jakob Pöltl (10)	Collins, Wesley (4)	Toyota Center; 10,640	0–1
2	October 6	Orlando	L 99–102	Doug McDermott (14)	Pöltl, Roby (6)	Devin Vassell (5)	AT&T Center; 11,561	0–2
3	October 9	New Orleans	L 97–111	Doug McDermott (14)	Gorgui Dieng (9)	Gorgui Dieng (4)	AT&T Center; 18,193	0–3
4	October 10	@ Utah	W 111–104	Devin Vassell (24)	Bates-Diop, Dieng, Johnson, Pöltl (5)	Jakob Pöltl (5)	Vivint Arena; 13,887	1–3
5	October 13	Oklahoma City	L 112–118	Joshua Primo (23)	Jakob Pöltl (10)	Jakob Pöltl (5)	AT&T Center; 13,836	1–4

2022–23 season schedule

=== Regular season ===
2022–23 game log
Total: 22–60 (Home: 14–27; Road: 8–33)
October: 5–2 (home: 2–1; road: 3–1)

Game	Date	Team	Score	High points	High rebounds	High assists	Location Attendance	Record
1	October 19	Charlotte	L 102–129	Keldon Johnson (20)	Keldon Johnson (11)	Joshua Primo (5)	AT&T Center; 16,236	0–1
2	October 21	@ Indiana	W 137–134	Josh Richardson (27)	Jakob Pöltl (8)	Joshua Primo (7)	Gainbridge Fieldhouse; 12,073	1–1
3	October 22	@ Philadelphia	W 114–105	Devin Vassell (22)	Jakob Pöltl (11)	Gorgui Dieng (5)	Wells Fargo Center; 19,822	2–1
4	October 24	@ Minnesota	W 115–106	Devin Vassell (23)	Jakob Pöltl (14)	Tre Jones (8)	Target Center; 15,347	3–1
5	October 26	@ Minnesota	L 122–134	Keldon Johnson (27)	Jakob Pöltl (10)	Josh Richardson (10)	Target Center; 16,165	3–2
6	October 28	Chicago	W 129–124	Keldon Johnson (33)	Jakob Pöltl (13)	Tre Jones (8)	AT&T Center; 16,562	4–2
7	October 30	Minnesota	W 107–98	Keldon Johnson (25)	Jakob Pöltl (14)	Johnson, Jones (8)	AT&T Center; 15,053	5–2

November : 1–14 (home: 1–7; road: 0–7)

Game	Date	Team	Score	High points	High rebounds	High assists	Location Attendance	Record
8	November 2	Toronto	L 100–143	Keita Bates-Diop (17)	Collins, Jones (8)	Tre Jones (7)	AT&T Center; 12,155	5–3
9	November 4	L.A. Clippers	L 106–113	Devin Vassell (29)	Johnson, Pöltl (7)	Tre Jones (6)	AT&T Center; 12,603	5–4
10	November 5	@ Denver	L 101–126	Keldon Johnson (25)	Jakob Pöltl (8)	Jakob Pöltl (7)	Ball Arena; 19,641	5–5
11	November 7	Denver	L 109–115	Keldon Johnson (30)	Charles Bassey (8)	Jones, Pöltl (9)	AT&T Center; 11,574	5–6
12	November 9	Memphis	L 122–124 (OT)	Pöltl, Vassell (22)	Jakob Pöltl (9)	Tre Jones (11)	AT&T Center; 13,507	5–7
13	November 11	Milwaukee	W 111–93	Keldon Johnson (29)	Jakob Pöltl (10)	Tre Jones (9)	AT&T Center; 15,642	6–7
14	November 14	@ Golden State	L 95–132	Keldon Johnson (15)	Jakob Pöltl (10)	Bassey, Hall, Richardson, Roby (3)	Chase Center; 18,064	6–8
15	November 15	@ Portland	L 110–117	Jakob Pöltl (31)	Jakob Pöltl (14)	Tre Jones (10)	Moda Center; 19,012	6–9
16	November 17	@ Sacramento	L 112–130	Devin Vassell (29)	Jakob Pöltl (7)	Jeremy Sochan (5)	Golden 1 Center; 16,522	6–10
17	November 19	@ L.A. Clippers	L 97–119	Jakob Pöltl (20)	Charles Bassey (9)	Tre Jones (10)	Crypto.com Arena; 18,581	6–11
18	November 20	@ L.A. Lakers	L 92–123	Devin Vassell (17)	Charles Bassey (8)	Charles Bassey (5)	Crypto.com Arena; 18,211	6–12
19	November 23	New Orleans	L 110–129	Devin Vassell (26)	Jakob Pöltl (14)	Tre Jones (9)	AT&T Center; 14,947	6–13
20	November 25	L.A. Lakers	L 94–105	Tre Jones (19)	Johnson, Sochan (9)	Jones, Sochan (5)	AT&T Center; 18,354	6–14
21	November 26	L.A. Lakers	L 138–143	Keldon Johnson (26)	Keldon Johnson (10)	Tre Jones (13)	AT&T Center; 18,354	6–15
22	November 30	@ Oklahoma City	L 111–119	Devin Vassell (25)	Romeo Langford (8)	Keldon Johnson (6)	Paycom Center; 15,605	6–16

December: 6–8 (home: 4–5; road: 2–3)

Game	Date	Team	Score	High points	High rebounds	High assists	Location Attendance	Record
23	December 2	New Orleans	L 99–117	Devin Vassell (25)	Charles Bassey (9)	Tre Jones (9)	AT&T Center; 17,202	6–17
24	December 4	Phoenix	L 95–133	Keldon Johnson (27)	Charles Bassey (7)	Zach Collins (5)	AT&T Center; 16,409	6–18
25	December 8	Houston	W 118–109	Keldon Johnson (32)	Keldon Johnson (7)	Jones, Langford (5)	AT&T Center; 13,140	7–18
26	December 10	@ Miami	W 115–111	Keldon Johnson (21)	Zach Collins (8)	Josh Richardson (6)	FTX Arena; 19,600	8–18
27	December 12	Cleveland	W 112–111	Josh Richardson (24)	Charles Bassey (11)	Collins, Jones (5)	AT&T Center; 13,434	9–18
28	December 14	Portland	L 112–128	Keldon Johnson (25)	Gorgui Dieng (8)	Tre Jones (6)	AT&T Center; 13,657	9–19
29	December 17	Miami	L 101–111	Keldon Johnson (22)	Jakob Pöltl (7)	Tre Jones (9)	Mexico City Arena; 20,160	9–20
30	December 19	@ Houston	W 124–105	Devin Vassell (26)	Collins, Sochan (7)	Tre Jones (8)	Toyota Center; 15,928	10–20
31	December 22	@ New Orleans	L 117–126	Jeremy Sochan (23)	Sochan, Vassell (9)	Jeremy Sochan (6)	Smoothie King Center; 16,417	10–21
32	December 23	@ Orlando	L 113–133	Keldon Johnson (17)	Jeremy Sochan (9)	Tre Jones (8)	Amway Center; 18,425	10–22
33	December 26	Utah	W 126–122	Devin Vassell (24)	Jakob Pöltl (9)	Devin Vassell (8)	AT&T Center; 16,351	11–22
34	December 27	@ Oklahoma City	L 114–130	Devin Vassell (20)	Jeremy Sochan (9)	Tre Jones (5)	Paycom Center; 16,229	11–23
35	December 29	New York	W 122–115	Keldon Johnson (30)	Jakob Pöltl (12)	Tre Jones (6)	AT&T Center; 18,354	12–23
36	December 31	Dallas	L 125–126	Keldon Johnson (30)	Jakob Pöltl (15)	Jones, Pöltl (6)	AT&T Center; 18,354	12–24

January : 2–13 (home: 2–6; road: 0–7)

Game	Date	Team	Score	High points	High rebounds	High assists	Location Attendance	Record
37	January 2	@ Brooklyn	L 103–139	Keldon Johnson (22)	Jakob Pöltl (11)	Tre Jones (7)	Barclays Center; 18,224	12–25
38	January 4	@ New York	L 114–116	Keldon Johnson (26)	Jakob Pöltl (8)	Tre Jones (6)	Madison Square Garden; 19,812	12–26
39	January 6	Detroit	W 121–109	Tre Jones (25)	Jakob Pöltl (16)	Jakob Pöltl (7)	AT&T Center; 13,107	13–26
40	January 7	Boston	L 116–121	Collins, Jones, Richardson (18)	Zach Collins (12)	Collins, Jones (5)	AT&T Center; 18,354	13–27
41	January 9	@ Memphis	L 113–121	Tre Jones (18)	Jakob Pöltl (7)	Tre Jones (7)	FedExForum; 16,013	13–28
42	January 11	@ Memphis	L 129–135	Keldon Johnson (24)	Collins, Pöltl (12)	Tre Jones (6)	FedExForum; 16,454	13–29
43	January 13	Golden State	L 113–144	Tre Jones (21)	Jakkob Pöltl (10)	Jones, Pöltl, Richardson (5)	Alamodome; 68,323	13–30
44	January 15	Sacramento	L 119–132	Jakob Pöltl (23)	Jeremy Sochan (8)	Tre Jones (8)	AT&T Center; 12,339	13–31
45	January 17	Brooklyn	W 106–98	Keldon Johnson (36)	Keldon Johnson (11)	Tre Jones (5)	AT&T Center; 13,532	14–31
46	January 20	L.A. Clippers	L 126–131	Keldon Johnson (23)	Langford, Pöltl, Sochan (6)	Tre Jones (8)	AT&T Center; 15,190	14–32
47	January 23	@ Portland	L 127–147	Keldon Johnson (20)	Jakob Pöltl (7)	Tre Jones (7)	Moda Center; 17,874	14–33
48	January 25	@ L.A. Lakers	L 104–113	Keldon Johnson (25)	Jakob Pöltl (8)	Tre Jones (6)	Crypto.com Arena; 17,955	14–34
49	January 26	@ L.A. Clippers	L 100–138	Keldon Johnson (19)	Zach Collins (10)	Tre Jones (4)	Crypto.com Arena; 16,958	14–35
50	January 28	Phoenix	L 118–128 (OT)	Keldon Johnson (34)	Jakob Pöltl (13)	Jakob Pöltl (6)	AT&T Center; 18,354	14–36
51	January 30	Washington	L 106–127	Keldon Johnson (26)	Zach Collins (11)	Tre Jones (9)	AT&T Center; 11,970	14–37

February : 1–10 (home: 0–2; road: 1–8)

Game	Date	Team	Score	High points	High rebounds	High assists	Location Attendance	Record
52	February 1	Sacramento	L 109–119	Malaki Branham (22)	Jakob Pöltl (12)	Branham, Johnson (5)	AT&T Center; 13,207	14–38
53	February 3	Philadelphia	L 125–137	Malaki Branham (26)	Jakob Pöltl (10)	Josh Richardson (7)	AT&T Center; 15,252	14–39
54	February 6	@ Chicago	L 104–128	Keldon Johnson (21)	Jakob Pöltl (9)	Branham, Pöltl (4)	United Center; 19,291	14–40
55	February 8	@ Toronto	L 98–112	Keldon Johnson (22)	Johnson, Pöltl, Richardson (7)	Blake Wesley (4)	Scotiabank Arena; 19,800	14–41
56	February 10	@ Detroit	L 131–138 (2OT)	Devonte' Graham (31)	Zach Collins (11)	Keita Bates-Diop (5)	Little Caesars Arena; 17,899	14–42
57	February 11	@ Atlanta	L 106–125	Keldon Johnson (25)	Jeremy Sochan (9)	Jeremy Sochan (5)	State Farm Arena; 17,875	14–43
58	February 13	@ Cleveland	L 109–117	Keldon Johnson (25)	Charles Bassey (8)	Devonte' Graham (8)	Rocket Mortgage FieldHouse; 19,432	14–44
59	February 15	@ Charlotte	L 110–120	Malaki Branham (23)	Zach Collins (12)	Zach Collins (5)	Spectrum Center; 14,155	14–45
60	February 23	@ Dallas	L 116–142	Malaki Branham (23)	Zach Collins (12)	Keldon Johnson (7)	American Airlines Center; 20,287	14–46
61	February 25	@ Utah	L 102–118	Jeremy Sochan (22)	Keldon Johnson (7)	Bates-Diop, Graham, Wesley (4)	Vivint Arena; 18,206	14–47
62	February 28	@ Utah	W 102–94	Keldon Johnson (25)	Charles Bassey (10)	Jeremy Sochan (6)	Vivint Arena; 18,206	15–47

March : 4–11 (home: 4–5; road: 0–6)

Game	Date	Team	Score	High points	High rebounds	High assists	Location Attendance	Record
63	March 2	Indiana	W 110–99	Jeremy Sochan (22)	Jeremy Sochan (13)	Collins, Jones (5)	AT&T Center; 14,617	16–47
64	March 4	Houston	L 110–122	Devonte' Graham (28)	Zach Collins (10)	Keita Bates-Diop (6)	AT&T Center; 18,354	16–48
65	March 5	@ Houston	L 110–142	Keita Bates-Diop (17)	Malaki Branham (7)	Johnson, Vassell (5)	Toyota Center; 16,721	16–49
66	March 10	Denver	W 128–120	Keldon Johnson (23)	Zach Collins (9)	Tre Jones (8)	AT&T Center; 18,354	17–49
67	March 12	Oklahoma City	L 90–102	Zach Collins (23)	Zach Collins (11)	Blake Wesley (6)	AT&T Center; 17,314	17–50
68	March 14	Orlando	W 132–114	Jeremy Sochan (29)	Jeremy Sochan (11)	Devonte' Graham (9)	AT&T Center; 13,708	18–50
69	March 15	Dallas	L 128–137 (OT)	Keldon Johnson (27)	Keldon Johnson (8)	Graham, Jones (5)	AT&T Center; 18,354	18–51
70	March 17	Memphis	L 120–126 (OT)	Malaki Branham (25)	Sandro Mamukelashvili (14)	Tre Jones (9)	AT&T Center; 15,221	18–52
71	March 19	Atlanta	W 126–118	Johnson, Vassell (29)	Keldon Johnson (12)	Tre Jones (6)	AT&T Center; 16,311	19–52
72	March 21	@ New Orleans	L 84–119	Sandro Mamukelashvili (20)	Julian Champagnie (6)	Tre Jones (8)	Smoothie King Center; 15,466	19–53
73	March 22	@ Milwaukee	L 94–130	Devin Vassell (16)	Collins, Mamukelashvili (7)	Blake Wesley (6)	Fiserv Forum; 17,756	19–54
74	March 24	@ Washington	L 124–136	Keldon Johnson (30)	Keldon Johnson (10)	Tre Jones (12)	Capital One Arena; 17,004	19–55
75	March 26	@ Boston	L 93–137	Zach Collins (21)	Zach Collins (7)	Collins, Jones, Vassell (4)	TD Garden; 19,156	19–56
76	March 29	Utah	L 117–128	Malaki Branham (21)	Collins, Mamukelashvili (8)	Graham, Jones (6)	AT&T Center; 18,354	19–57
77	March 31	@ Golden State	L 115–130	Keldon Johnson (22)	Sandro Mamukelashvili (11)	Tre Jones (6)	Chase Center; 18,064	19–58

April : 3–2 (home: 1–1; road: 2–1)

Game	Date	Team	Score	High points	High rebounds	High assists	Location Attendance	Record
78	April 2	@ Sacramento	W 142–134 (OT)	Doug McDermott (30)	Barlow, Jones (10)	Tre Jones (11)	Golden 1 Center; 18,183	20–58
79	April 4	@ Phoenix	L 94–115	Malaki Branham (21)	Sandro Mamukelashvili (8)	Tre Jones (9)	Footprint Center; 17,071	20–59
80	April 6	Portland	W 129–127	Keita Bates-Diop (25)	Zach Collins (10)	Tre Jones (10)	Moody Center; 16,023	21–59
81	April 8	Minnesota	L 131–151	Julian Champagnie (24)	Tre Jones (10)	Tre Jones (12)	Moody Center; 16,148	21–60
82	April 9	@ Dallas	W 138–117	Sandro Mamukelashvili (23)	Dominick Barlow (19)	Blake Wesley (9)	American Airlines Center; 20,141	22–60

2022–23 season schedule

== Player statistics ==
Legend
GP	Games played	GS	Games started	MPG	Minutes per game
FG%	Field-goal percentage	3P%	3-point field-goal percentage	FT%	Free-throw percentage
RPG	Rebounds per game	APG	Assists per game	SPG	Steals per game
BPG	Blocks per game	PPG	Points per game

=== Regular season ===
San Antonio Spurs statistics
Player	GP	GS	MPG	FG%	3P%	FT%	RPG	APG	SPG	BPG	PPG
Tre Jones	68	65	29.2	.459	.285	.860	3.6	6.6	1.3	.1	12.9
Keita Bates-Diop	67	42	21.7	.508	.394	.793	3.7	1.5	.7	.3	9.7
Malaki Branham	66	32	23.5	.440	.302	.829	2.7	1.9	.5	.1	10.2
Doug McDermott	64	0	20.5	.457	.413	.757	2.2	1.4	.2	.1	10.2
Keldon Johnson	63	63	32.7	.452	.329	.749	5.0	2.9	.7	.2	22.0
Zach Collins	63	26	22.9	.518	.374	.761	6.4	2.9	.6	.8	11.6
Jeremy Sochan	56	53	26.0	.453	.246	.698	5.3	2.5	.8	.4	11.0
Jakob Pöltl^{†}	46	46	26.1	.616	.000	.605	9.0	3.1	.8	1.1	12.1
Romeo Langford	43	21	19.6	.467	.262	.696	2.7	1.2	.6	.3	6.9
Josh Richardson^{†}	42	6	23.7	.436	.357	.883	2.8	3.3	1.0	.3	11.5
Isaiah Roby	42	2	11.3	.432	.300	.488	2.5	.9	.4	.2	4.1
Devin Vassell	38	32	31.0	.439	.387	.780	3.9	3.6	1.1	.4	18.5
Blake Wesley	37	1	18.1	.321	.385	.591	2.2	2.7	.7	.1	5.0
Charles Bassey	35	2	14.5	.644	.375	.595	5.5	1.3	.5	.9	5.7
Gorgui Dieng	31	1	11.5	.385	.280	.769	3.5	1.7	.1	.5	3.9
Stanley Johnson	30	0	15.6	.533	.450	.667	3.2	2.2	.5	.2	5.8
Dominick Barlow	28	0	14.6	.535	.000	.720	3.6	.9	.4	.7	3.9
Devonte' Graham^{†}	20	8	26.4	.380	.358	.750	2.5	4.0	.8	.3	13.0
Sandro Mamukelashvili^{†}	19	7	23.3	.453	.343	.692	6.8	2.4	.5	.4	10.8
Julian Champagnie^{†}	15	3	20.9	.461	.407	.824	4.0	.7	.3	.3	11.0
Jordan Hall	9	0	9.2	.321	.200	.778	1.3	1.2	.1	.0	3.1
Joshua Primo	4	0	23.3	.346	.250	.778	3.3	4.5	.3	.5	7.0
Alize Johnson	4	0	7.5	.500	.000	.500	2.5	.3	.3	.0	1.8

- ^{†} Denotes player spent time with another team in the season. Stats reflect time with the Spurs only.

== Transactions ==
=== Trades ===
June 24, 2022	To San Antonio Spurs 2024 LAL second-round pick Cash considerations	To Memphis Grizzlies Draft rights to Kennedy Chandler (No. 38)
June 30, 2022	To San Antonio Spurs Danilo Gallinari; 2023 CHA protected first-round pick 2025 ATL first-round pick 2026 right to swap first-round picks 2027 ATL first-round pick	To Atlanta Hawks Dejounte Murray; Jock Landale
January 5, 2023	To San Antonio Spurs Noah Vonleh; Cash considerations	To Boston Celtics Future conditional second-round pick
February 7, 2023	To San Antonio Spurs Dewayne Dedmon; 2028 MIA second-round pick	To Miami Heat Cash considerations
February 9, 2023	To San Antonio Spurs Khem Birch; 2024 TOR first-round pick 2023 TOR second-round pick 2025 TOR second-round pick	To Toronto Raptors Jakob Pöltl
February 9, 2023	To San Antonio Spurs Devonte' Graham; 2024 NOP second-round pick 2026 NOP second-round pick 2028 NOP second-round pick 2029 NOP second-round pick	To New Orleans Pelicans Josh Richardson

=== Free agents ===
==== Additions ====
Player	Signed	Former team	Ref.
Isaiah Roby	July 5, 2022	Oklahoma City Thunder	
Dominick Barlow	July 11, 2022 (Two-way contract)	Team Overtime (Overtime Elite)	
Julian Champagnie	February 16, 2023 (Two-way contract)	Philadelphia 76ers	
Sandro Mamukelashvili	March 3, 2023	Milwaukee Bucks	

==== Subtractions ====
Player	Reason left	New team	Ref.
Lonnie Walker IV	Free agent	Los Angeles Lakers	
Danilo Gallinari	Waived	Boston Celtics	
Tyler Johnson	Free agent	Brisbane Bullets	
Joshua Primo	Waived		
Noah Vonleh	Waived		
Dewayne Dedmon	Waived	Philadelphia 76ers	
Stanley Johnson	Waived	Sioux Falls Skyforce	
Isaiah Roby	Waived	New York Knicks	
