= 2022–23 Toronto Raptors season =

- Head coach: Nick Nurse
- President: Masai Ujiri
- General manager: Bobby Webster
- Owners: Maple Leaf Sports & Entertainment
- Arena: Scotiabank Arena

Results
- Record: 41–41 (.500)
- Place: Division: 5th (Atlantic); Conference: 9th (Eastern)
- Playoff finish: Did not qualify
- Stats at Basketball Reference

Local media
- Television: TSN; Sportsnet

The 2022–23 Toronto Raptors season was the 28th season of the franchise in the National Basketball Association (NBA).

Finishing the season as the ninth seed in the Eastern Conference with a 41–41 record, the Raptors qualified into the play-in tournament for the first time in franchise history. However, they ultimately failed to qualify for the playoffs following their loss to the 10-seeded Chicago Bulls in the first stage of the play-in.

This was Nick Nurse's final season with the team as head coach; the Raptors fired him on April 21, 2023.

== Draft picks ==
Round	Pick	Player	Position	Nationality	School / club team
2	33	Christian Koloko	C	Cameroon	Arizona (Jr.)

The Raptors entered the draft with one second-round pick acquired via trade with the San Antonio Spurs in February 2023; the pick originally belonged to the Detroit Pistons. They had traded their original selections to the Spurs in such trade and Philadelphia 76ers (and eventually used by the Golden State Warriors), respectively.

== Roster ==
2022–23 Toronto Raptors roster
Players

Pos.	No.	Player	Height	Weight	DOB	From
F	5	Precious Achiuwa	6 ft 8 in (2.03 m)	225 lb (102 kg)	1999-09-19	Memphis
F	3	O.G. Anunoby	6 ft 7 in (2.01 m)	232 lb (105 kg)	1997-07-17	Indiana
F	45	Dalano Banton (GL)	6 ft 7 in (2.01 m)	204 lb (93 kg)	1999-11-07	Nebraska
F	4	Scottie Barnes	6 ft 8 in (2.03 m)	225 lb (102 kg)	2001-08-01	Florida State
G/F	1	Will Barton	6 ft 5 in (1.96 m)	181 lb (82 kg)	1991-01-06	Memphis
F/C	25	Chris Boucher	6 ft 9 in (2.06 m)	200 lb (91 kg)	1993-01-11	Oregon
G	20	Jeff Dowtin (TW)	6 ft 3 in (1.91 m)	177 lb (80 kg)	1997-05-07	Rhode Island
G	22	Malachi Flynn	6 ft 1 in (1.85 m)	175 lb (79 kg)	1998-05-10	San Diego State
F	8	Ron Jr. Harper (TW)	6 ft 6 in (1.98 m)	245 lb (111 kg)	2000-04-12	Rutgers
C	35	Christian Koloko	7 ft 0 in (2.13 m)	230 lb (104 kg)	2000-06-20	Arizona
F	32	Otto Jr. Porter	6 ft 8 in (2.03 m)	198 lb (90 kg)	1993-06-03	Georgetown
C	19	Jakob Pöltl	7 ft 1 in (2.16 m)	245 lb (111 kg)	1995-10-15	Utah
F	43	Pascal Siakam	6 ft 8 in (2.03 m)	230 lb (104 kg)	1994-04-02	New Mexico State
G/F	33	Gary Jr. Trent	6 ft 5 in (1.96 m)	209 lb (95 kg)	1999-01-18	Duke
G	23	Fred VanVleet	6 ft 1 in (1.85 m)	197 lb (89 kg)	1994-02-25	Wichita State
G	11	Joe Wieskamp	6 ft 6 in (1.98 m)	205 lb (93 kg)	1999-08-23	Iowa
F	21	Thaddeus Young	6 ft 8 in (2.03 m)	235 lb (107 kg)	1988-06-21	Georgia Tech

Coaches
Head coach
- Nick Nurse
Assistant(s)
- Nate Bjorkgren
- John Corbacio
- Fab Flournoy
- Trevor Gleeson
- Jon Goodwillie
- Adrian Griffin
- Nathaniel Mitchell
- Rico Hines
- Jim Sann
- Earl Watson

Legend
- (DP) Unsigned draft pick
- (FA) Free agent
- (S) Suspended
- (GL) On assignment to G League affiliate
- (TW) Two-way affiliate player
- Injured

Roster
Updated: February 28, 2023

== Standings ==
=== Division ===
Atlantic Division	W	L	PCT	GB	Home	Road	Div	GP
y – Boston Celtics	57	25	.695	–	32‍–‍9	25‍–‍16	11–5	82
x – Philadelphia 76ers	54	28	.659	3.0	29‍–‍12	25‍–‍16	10–6	82
x – New York Knicks	47	35	.573	10.0	23‍–‍18	24‍–‍17	8–8	82
x – Brooklyn Nets	45	37	.549	12.0	23‍–‍18	22‍–‍19	7–9	82
pi – Toronto Raptors	41	41	.500	16.0	27‍–‍14	14‍–‍27	4–12	82

=== Conference ===
Eastern Conference
#	Team	W	L	PCT	GB	GP
1	z – Milwaukee Bucks *	58	24	.707	–	82
2	y – Boston Celtics *	57	25	.695	1.0	82
3	x – Philadelphia 76ers	54	28	.659	4.0	82
4	x – Cleveland Cavaliers	51	31	.622	7.0	82
5	x – New York Knicks	47	35	.573	11.0	82
6	x – Brooklyn Nets	45	37	.549	13.0	82
7	y – Miami Heat *	44	38	.537	14.0	82
8	x – Atlanta Hawks	41	41	.500	17.0	82
9	pi – Toronto Raptors	41	41	.500	17.0	82
10	pi – Chicago Bulls	40	42	.488	18.0	82
11	Indiana Pacers	35	47	.427	23.0	82
12	Washington Wizards	35	47	.427	23.0	82
13	Orlando Magic	34	48	.415	24.0	82
14	Charlotte Hornets	27	55	.329	31.0	82
15	Detroit Pistons	17	65	.207	41.0	82

== Game log ==
=== Preseason ===
2022 pre-season game log
Total: 3–2 (Home: 2–1; Road: 1–1)
Preseason: 3–2 (home: 2–1; road: 1–1)

Game	Date	Team	Score	High points	High rebounds	High assists	Location Attendance	Record
1	October 2	Utah	W 114–82	Chris Boucher (11)	Chris Boucher (10)	Barnes, Wilson (3)	Rogers Place; 17,100	1–0
2	October 5	@ Boston	W 125–119 (OT)	Achiuwa, Jackson, Siakam (13)	D. J. Wilson (8)	Jeff Dowtin (5)	TD Garden; 19,156	2–0
3	October 7	@ Houston	L 100–116	Pascal Siakam (18)	Scottie Barnes (7)	Banton, Barnes (4)	Toyota Center; 10,902	2–1
4	October 9	Chicago	L 98–115	Pascal Siakam (18)	Pascal Siakam (9)	Gary Trent Jr. (3)	Scotiabank Arena; 16,559	2–2
5	October 14	Boston	W 137–134 (OT)	O.G. Anunoby (32)	Achiuwa, Young (8)	Fred VanVleet (7)	Bell Centre; 21,900	3–2

2022–23 preseason schedule

=== Regular season ===
2022–23 game log
Total: 41–41 (Home: 27–14; Road: 14–27)
October: 4–3 (home: 3–1; road: 1–2)

Game	Date	Team	Score	High points	High rebounds	High assists	Location Attendance	Record
1	October 19	Cleveland	W 108–105	Pascal Siakam (23)	Pascal Siakam (11)	Scottie Barnes (7)	Scotiabank Arena; 19,800	1–0
2	October 21	@ Brooklyn	L 105–109	Pascal Siakam (37)	Pascal Siakam (13)	Pascal Siakam (11)	Barclays Center; 17,732	1–1
3	October 22	@ Miami	L 109–112	Siakam, Trent Jr. (23)	Precious Achiuwa (11)	Fred VanVleet (10)	FTX Arena; 19,600	1–2
4	October 24	@ Miami	W 98–90	Fred VanVleet (24)	Precious Achiuwa (22)	Fred VanVleet (9)	FTX Arena; 19,600	2–2
5	October 26	Philadelphia	W 119–109	Gary Trent Jr. (27)	Scottie Barnes (10)	Pascal Siakam (13)	Scotiabank Arena; 19,800	3–2
6	October 28	Philadelphia	L 90–112	Pascal Siakam (26)	Pascal Siakam (10)	Pascal Siakam (6)	Scotiabank Arena; 19,800	3–3
7	October 31	Atlanta	W 139–109	Pascal Siakam (31)	Pascal Siakam (12)	Scottie Barnes (8)	Scotiabank Arena; 19,800	4–3

November: 7–7 (home: 5–1; road: 2–6)

Game	Date	Team	Score	High points	High rebounds	High assists	Location Attendance	Record
8	November 2	@ San Antonio	W 143–100	Gary Trent Jr. (24)	Pascal Siakam (10)	Pascal Siakam (11)	AT&T Center; 12,155	5–3
9	November 4	@ Dallas	L 110–111	O.G. Anunoby (27)	Scottie Barnes (11)	Scottie Barnes (10)	American Airlines Center; 20,177	5–4
10	November 6	Chicago	W 113–104	Fred VanVleet (30)	Scottie Barnes (10)	Fred VanVleet (11)	Scotiabank Arena; 19,800	6–4
11	November 7	@ Chicago	L 97–111	Fred VanVleet (27)	Scottie Barnes (6)	Scottie Barnes (5)	United Center; 21,142	6–5
12	November 9	Houston	W 116–109	Fred VanVleet (32)	O.G. Anunoby (10)	Scottie Barnes (5)	Scotiabank Arena; 19,800	7–5
13	November 11	@ Oklahoma City	L 113–132	Chris Boucher (20)	Chris Boucher (12)	Banton, Barnes (4)	Paycom Center; 16,104	7–6
14	November 12	@ Indiana	L 104–118	O.G. Anunoby (26)	Scottie Barnes (9)	Scottie Barnes (5)	Gainbridge Fieldhouse; 13,089	7–7
15	November 14	@ Detroit	W 115–111	Dalano Banton (27)	O.G. Anunoby (7)	Banton, Barnes, Flynn, Young (4)	Little Caesars Arena; 16,988	8–7
16	November 16	Miami	W 112–104	O.G. Anunoby (32)	Anunoby, Boucher (10)	Fred VanVleet (8)	Scotiabank Arena; 19,800	9–7
17	November 19	@ Atlanta	L 122–124 (OT)	Scottie Barnes (28)	Barnes, Koloko (11)	Scottie Barnes (9)	State Farm Arena; 18,051	9–8
18	November 23	Brooklyn	L 98–112	Gary Trent Jr. (19)	Chris Boucher (16)	Thaddeus Young (5)	Scotiabank Arena; 19,800	9–9
19	November 26	Dallas	W 105–100	Anunoby, VanVleet (26)	Chris Boucher (13)	Fred VanVleet (7)	Scotiabank Arena; 19,800	10–9
20	November 28	Cleveland	W 100–88	O.G. Anunoby (20)	Pascal Siakam (11)	Barnes, Siakam, VanVleet (5)	Scotiabank Arena; 19,800	11–9
21	November 30	@ New Orleans	L 108–126	Gary Trent Jr. (35)	Siakam, VanVleet (6)	Fred VanVleet (6)	Smoothie King Center; 14,845	11–10

December: 5–10 (home: 3–6; road: 2–4)

Game	Date	Team	Score	High points	High rebounds	High assists	Location Attendance	Record
22	December 2	@ Brooklyn	L 105–114	Pascal Siakam (24)	Barnes, Koloko (9)	Fred VanVleet (6)	Barclays Center; 17,732	11–11
23	December 3	Orlando	W 121–108	O.G. Anunoby (32)	Scottie Barnes (14)	Pascal Siakam (10)	Scotiabank Arena; 19,800	12–11
24	December 5	Boston	L 110–116	Pascal Siakam (29)	Chris Boucher (9)	Pascal Siakam (7)	Scotiabank Arena; 19,800	12–12
25	December 7	L.A. Lakers	W 126–113	Siakam, VanVleet (25)	Scottie Barnes (17)	Siakam, VanVleet (7)	Scotiabank Arena; 19,800	13–12
26	December 9	@ Orlando	L 109–113	Pascal Siakam (36)	Pascal Siakam (9)	Pascal Siakam (7)	Amway Center; 17,008	13–13
27	December 11	@ Orlando	L 99–111	Gary Trent Jr. (24)	Pascal Siakam (6)	Siakam, VanVleet (7)	Amway Center; 16,891	13–14
28	December 14	Sacramento	L 123–124	Fred VanVleet (39)	Fred VanVleet (8)	Scottie Barnes (10)	Scotiabank Arena; 19,800	13–15
29	December 16	Brooklyn	L 116–119	Fred VanVleet (39)	Pascal Siakam (7)	Pascal Siakam (5)	Scotiabank Arena; 19,800	13–16
30	December 18	Golden State	L 110–126	Pascal Siakam (27)	Chris Boucher (14)	Fred VanVleet (8)	Scotiabank Arena; 19,800	13–17
31	December 19	@ Philadelphia	L 101–104 (OT)	Pascal Siakam (38)	Pascal Siakam (15)	Pascal Siakam (6)	Wells Fargo Center; 20,408	13–18
32	December 21	@ New York	W 113–106	Pascal Siakam (52)	Pascal Siakam (9)	Pascal Siakam (7)	Madison Square Garden; 19,294	14–18
33	December 23	@ Cleveland	W 118–107	Anunoby, Siakam (26)	Scottie Barnes (10)	Pascal Siakam (9)	Rocket Mortgage FieldHouse; 19,432	15–18
34	December 27	L.A. Clippers	L 113–124	Pascal Siakam (36)	Scottie Barnes (12)	Scottie Barnes (8)	Scotiabank Arena; 19,800	15–19
35	December 29	Memphis	L 106–119	Pascal Siakam (25)	Barnes, Siakam (10)	Malachi Flynn (5)	Scotiabank Arena; 19,800	15–20
36	December 30	Phoenix	W 113–104	Gary Trent Jr.(35)	Anunoby, Barnes, Trent Jr. (5)	Pascal Siakam (6)	Scotiabank Arena; 19,800	16–20

January: 7–9 (home: 4–4; road: 3–5)

Game	Date	Team	Score	High points	High rebounds	High assists	Location Attendance	Record
37	January 2	@ Indiana	L 114–122	Gary Trent Jr. (32)	Anunoby, Barnes (8)	Scottie Barnes (8)	Gainbridge Fieldhouse; 14,054	16–21
38	January 4	Milwaukee	L 101–104 (OT)	Fred VanVleet (28)	O.G. Anunoby (9)	Fred VanVleet (12)	Scotiabank Arena; 19,800	16–22
39	January 6	New York	L 108–112	Fred VanVleet (28)	Pascal Siakam (13)	Fred VanVleet (7)	Scotiabank Arena; 19,800	16–23
40	January 8	Portland	W 117–105	Pascal Siakam (27)	Scottie Barnes (9)	Fred VanVleet (7)	Scotiabank Arena; 19,800	17–23
41	January 10	Charlotte	W 132–120	Pascal Siakam (28)	Koloko, Siakam (8)	Fred VanVleet (8)	Scotiabank Arena; 19,800	18–23
42	January 12	Charlotte	W 124–114	Pascal Siakam (35)	Barnes, Siakam (7)	Scottie Barnes (9)	Scotiabank Arena; 19,800	19–23
43	January 14	Atlanta	L 103–114	Scottie Barnes (27)	Scottie Barnes (12)	Pascal Siakam (6)	Scotiabank Arena; 19,800	19–24
44	January 16	@ New York	W 123–121 (OT)	Fred VanVleet (33)	Achiuwa, Siakam (8)	Pascal Siakam (9)	Madison Square Garden; 19,812	20–24
45	January 17	@ Milwaukee	L 122–130	Fred VanVleet (39)	Scottie Barnes (13)	Fred VanVleet (7)	Fiserv Forum; 17,341	20–25
46	January 19	@ Minnesota	L 126–128	Scottie Barnes (29)	Anunoby, Barnes (8)	Fred VanVleet (10)	Target Center; 16,318	20–26
47	January 21	Boston	L 104–106	Pascal Siakam (29)	Precious Achiuwa (11)	Pascal Siakam (10)	Scotiabank Arena; 19,800	20–27
48	January 22	New York	W 125–116	Fred VanVleet (28)	Precious Achiuwa (11)	Barnes, Siakam (6)	Scotiabank Arena; 19,261	21–27
49	January 25	@ Sacramento	W 113–95	Pascal Siakam (26)	Pascal Siakam (11)	Scottie Barnes (10)	Golden 1 Center; 17,767	22–27
50	January 27	@ Golden State	L 117–129	Fred VanVleet (28)	Precious Achiuwa (11)	Fred VanVleet (10)	Chase Center; 18,064	22–28
51	January 28	@ Portland	W 123–105	Precious Achiuwa (27)	Precious Achiuwa (13)	Fred VanVleet (9)	Moda Center; 19,393	23–28
52	January 30	@ Phoenix	L 106–114	Fred VanVleet (24)	Precious Achiuwa (12)	Fred VanVleet (9)	Footprint Center; 17,071	23–29

February: 8–3 (home: 5–1; road: 3–2)

Game	Date	Team	Score	High points	High rebounds	High assists	Location Attendance	Record
53	February 1	@ Utah	L 128–131	Fred VanVleet (34)	Scottie Barnes (14)	Fred VanVleet (10)	Vivint Arena; 18,206	23–30
54	February 3	@ Houston	W 117–111	Fred VanVleet (32)	Achiuwa, Boucher (8)	Barnes, Siakam, VanVleet (4)	Toyota Center; 16,585	24–30
55	February 5	@ Memphis	W 106–103	Pascal Siakam (19)	Chris Boucher (10)	Fred VanVleet (7)	FedEx Forum; 17,794	25–30
56	February 8	San Antonio	W 112–98	Pascal Siakam (37)	Chris Boucher (11)	Pascal Siakam (7)	Scotiabank Arena; 19 800	26–30
57	February 10	Utah	L 116–122	Pascal Siakam (35)	Scottie Barnes (7)	Scottie Barnes (9)	Scotiabank Arena; 19,800	26–31
58	February 12	Detroit	W 119–118	Fred VanVleet (35)	Precious Achiuwa (11)	Fred VanVleet (8)	Scotiabank Arena; 19,800	27–31
59	February 14	Orlando	W 123–113	Jakob Pöltl (30)	Precious Achiuwa (13)	Fred VanVleet (15)	Scotiabank Arena; 19,800	28–31
60	February 23	New Orleans	W 115–110	Pascal Siakam (26)	Jakob Pöltl (18)	Pascal Siakam (5)	Scotiabank Arena; 19,800	29–31
61	February 25	@ Detroit	W 95–91	Pascal Siakam (29)	Jakob Pöltl (14)	Pascal Siakam (5)	Little Caesars Arena; 20,190	30–31
62	February 26	@ Cleveland	L 93–118	Pascal Siakam (25)	Jakob Pöltl (9)	Barnes, Siakam (5)	Rocket Mortgage FieldHouse; 19, 432	30–32
63	February 28	Chicago	W 104–98	Pascal Siakam (20)	Anunoby, Barnes, Siakam (8)	Fred VanVleet (9)	Scotiabank Arena; 19,800	31–32

March: 7–7 (home: 6–1; road: 1–6)

Game	Date	Team	Score	High points	High rebounds	High assists	Location Attendance	Record
64	March 2	@ Washington	L 108–119	O.G. Anunoby (26)	Jakob Pöltl (13)	Fred VanVleet (8)	Capital One Arena; 14,643	31–33
65	March 4	@ Washington	W 116–109 (OT)	Gary Trent Jr. (26)	Pöltl, Trent Jr. (5)	Fred VanVleet (10)	Capital One Arena; 18,174	32–33
66	March 6	@ Denver	L 113–118	Fred VanVleet (21)	Barnes, Pöltl (9)	Fred VanVleet (14)	Ball Arena; 19,520	32–34
67	March 8	@ L.A. Clippers	L 100–108	Barnes, Siakam (20)	Jakob Pöltl (11)	Fred VanVleet (9)	Crypto.com Arena; 19,068	32–35
68	March 10	@ L.A. Lakers	L 112–122	Scottie Barnes (32)	Jakob Pöltl (10)	Fred VanVleet (10)	Crypto.com Arena; 18,322	32–36
69	March 14	Denver	W 125–110	Fred VanVleet (36)	Jakob Pöltl (11)	Fred VanVleet (7)	Scotiabank Arena; 19,800	33–36
70	March 16	Oklahoma City	W 128–111	Pascal Siakam (25)	Pascal Siakam (14)	Pascal Siakam (8)	Scotiabank Arena; 19,800	34–36
71	March 18	Minnesota	W 122–107	Fred VanVleet (28)	Jakob Pöltl (11)	Fred VanVleet (7)	Scotiabank Arena; 19,800	35–36
72	March 19	@ Milwaukee	L 111–118	Fred VanVleet (23)	Pascal Siakam (12)	Fred VanVleet (11)	Fiserv Forum; 17,341	35–37
73	March 22	Indiana	L 114–118	Pascal Siakam (31)	Pascal Siakam (10)	Fred VanVleet (11)	Scotiabank Arena; 19,800	35–38
74	March 24	Detroit	W 118–97	Pascal Siakam (32)	Chris Boucher (13)	Pascal Siakam (9)	Scotiabank Arena; 19,800	36–38
75	March 26	Washington	W 114–104	O.G. Anunoby (29)	Jakob Pöltl (12)	Fred VanVleet (7)	Scotiabank Arena; 19,800	37–38
76	March 28	Miami	W 106–92	Pascal Siakam (26)	Jakob Pöltl (10)	Scottie Barnes (12)	Scotiabank Arena; 19,800	38–38
77	March 31	@ Philadelphia	L 110–117	Scottie Barnes (29)	Jakob Pöltl (10)	Scottie Barnes (8)	Wells Fargo Center; 20,993	38–39

April: 3–2 (home: 1–0; road: 2–2)

Game	Date	Team	Score	High points	High rebounds	High assists	Location Attendance	Record
78	April 2	@ Charlotte	W 128–108	Pascal Siakam (36)	Jakob Pöltl (9)	Fred VanVleet (20)	Spectrum Center; 16,052	39–39
79	April 4	@ Charlotte	W 120–100	Pascal Siakam (22)	Pascal Siakam (14)	Fred VanVleet (6)	Spectrum Center; 14,965	40–39
80	April 5	@ Boston	L 93–97	Pascal Siakam (28)	Pascal Siakam (11)	Barnes, VanVleet (5)	TD Garden; 19,156	40–40
81	April 7	@ Boston	L 102–121	Pascal Siakam (19)	Achiuwa, Pöltl (7)	Fred VanVleet (8)	TD Garden; 19,156	40–41
82	April 9	Milwaukee	W 121–105	Gary Trent Jr. (23)	Precious Achiuwa (13)	Dalano Banton (7)	Scotiabank Arena; 19,800	41–41

2022–23 season schedule

=== Play-in ===
2023 play-in game log
Total: 0–1 (Home: 0–1; Road: 0–0)
Play-in: 0–1 (home: 0–1; road: 0–0)

Game	Date	Team	Score	High points	High rebounds	High assists	Location Attendance	Record
1	April 12	Chicago	L 105–109	Pascal Siakam (32)	Fred VanVleet (12)	Fred VanVleet (8)	Scotiabank Arena; 19,800	0–1

2022–23 season schedule

== Player statistics ==
=== Regular season ===
Player	POS	GP	GS	MP	REB	AST	STL	BLK	PTS	MPG	RPG	APG	SPG	BPG	PPG
Scottie Barnes	SF	77	76	2,678	512	371	83	61	1,179	34.8	6.6	4.8	1.1	.8	15.3
Chris Boucher	PF	76	0	1,523	421	29	47	64	712	20.0	5.5	.4	.6	.8	9.4
Pascal Siakam	PF	71	71	2,652	556	415	65	36	1,720	37.4	7.8	5.8	.9	.5	24.2
Fred VanVleet	PG	69	69	2,535	280	495	123	38	1,335	36.7	4.1	7.2	1.8	.6	19.3
OG Anunoby	SF	67	67	2,386	332	131	128	50	1,124	35.6	5.0	2.0	1.9	.7	16.8
Gary Trent Jr.	SG	66	44	2,118	173	106	104	14	1,148	32.1	2.6	1.6	1.6	.2	17.4
Christian Koloko	C	58	19	802	171	31	21	57	182	13.8	2.9	.5	.4	1.0	3.1
Precious Achiuwa	C	55	12	1,140	328	50	31	30	508	20.7	6.0	.9	.6	.5	9.2
Thaddeus Young	PF	54	9	795	166	75	54	5	240	14.7	3.1	1.4	1.0	.1	4.4
Malachi Flynn	PG	53	2	691	76	70	21	4	246	13.0	1.4	1.3	.4	.1	4.6
Juancho Hernangómez	PF	42	10	614	123	25	16	6	122	14.6	2.9	.6	.4	.1	2.9
Dalano Banton	PG	31	2	279	45	36	13	13	142	9.0	1.5	1.2	.4	.4	4.6
Jakob Pöltl^{†}	C	26	25	707	237	56	30	34	341	27.2	9.1	2.2	1.2	1.3	13.1
Jeff Dowtin	PG	25	0	259	23	31	9	3	61	10.4	.9	1.2	.4	.1	2.4
Khem Birch	C	20	0	162	25	7	5	5	43	8.1	1.3	.4	.3	.3	2.2
Will Barton^{†}	SG	16	2	211	26	17	11	3	72	13.2	1.6	1.1	.7	.2	4.5
Joe Wieskamp	SF	9	0	50	4	3	0	0	9	5.6	.4	.3	.0	.0	1.0
Ron Harper Jr.	PF	9	0	48	7	4	0	1	20	5.3	.8	.4	.0	.1	2.2
Otto Porter Jr.	SF	8	2	146	19	8	11	0	44	18.3	2.4	1.0	1.4	.0	5.5
Justin Champagnie^{†}	SF	3	0	11	4	1	0	0	6	3.7	1.3	.3	.0	.0	2.0

- ^{†} Denotes player spent time with another team in the season. Stats reflect time with the Raptors only.

== Transactions ==
=== Trades ===
To San Antonio Spurs: Khem Birch; 2023 second-round pick; 2024 protected first-round pick; 2025 second-round pick	To Toronto Raptors: Jakob Pöltl

=== Free agency ===
==== Re-signed ====
Date	Player	Contract terms	Ref.
July 7	Chris Boucher	3 year $35 million	

==== Additions ====
Date	Player	Contract terms	Former team	Ref.
July 6	Otto Porter Jr.	2-yr	Golden State Warriors	
July 8	D. J. Wilson	2-yr	Oklahoma City Blue (G League)	
July 14	Justin Champagnie	2-yr	Raptors 905 (G League)	
July 14	Ron Harper Jr.	Two-way contract	Rutgers Scarlet Knights	
July 19	Jeff Dowtin	Two-way contract	Lakeland Magic (G League)	
July 28	Juancho Hernangómez	1-yr	Utah Jazz	
August 3	Gabe Brown	1-yr (Exhibit 10)	Michigan State Spartans	
August 31	Josh Jackson	1-yr	Sacramento Kings	

==== Subtractions ====
Date	Player	Reason	New team	Ref.
July 30	Armoni Brooks	Waived	Atlanta Hawks	
August 29	Sviatoslav Mykhailiuk	Waived	New York Knicks	
August 19	Isaac Bonga	Unrestricted free agent	Bayern Munich	
August 28	Yuta Watanabe	Unrestricted free agent	Brooklyn Nets	
