= Xavier Sneed =

American basketball player (born 1997)

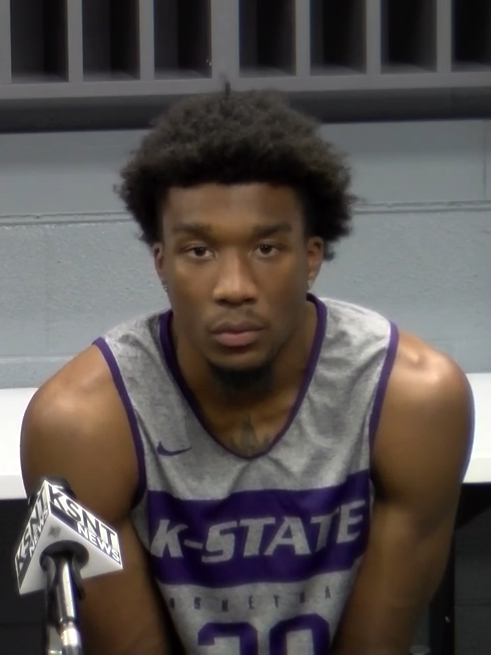
- Sneed with Kansas State in 2019

Free agent
- Position: Small forward / power forward

Personal information
- Born: December 21, 1997 (age 28) St. Louis, Missouri, U.S.
- Listed height: 6 ft 5 in (1.96 m)
- Listed weight: 215 lb (98 kg)

Career information
- High school: Hazelwood Central (Florissant, Missouri)
- College: Kansas State (2016–2020)
- NBA draft: 2020: undrafted
- Playing career: 2021–present

Career history
- 2021: Greensboro Swarm
- 2021: Niagara River Lions
- 2021–2022: Greensboro Swarm
- 2021–2022: Memphis Grizzlies
- 2022: Utah Jazz
- 2022: →Salt Lake City Stars
- 2022–2023: Greensboro Swarm
- 2023: Charlotte Hornets
- 2023–2024: Happy Casa Brindisi
- 2024–2025: Bnei Herzliya
- 2025–2026: Acqua S.Bernardo Cantù
- 2026: Hapoel Jerusalem
- Stats at NBA.com
- Stats at Basketball Reference

Xavier Tyron Sneed (born December 21, 1997) is an American professional basketball player who last played for Hapoel Jerusalem of the Ligat HaAl and the EuroCup. He played college basketball for the Kansas State Wildcats. He played in the National Basketball Association (NBA) from 2021 to 2023.

== High school career ==
Born in St. Louis, Missouri, Sneed attended Hazelwood Central High School where he helped the Hawks reach a 70–18 record during his final three seasons, which included at least 23 wins each year and a 5–0 mark in conference play in the 2015–16 season. He committed to playing college basketball for Kansas State over offers from Illinois and Xavier. In 2016, he was a consensus Top 160 prospect by most recruiting services, ranking No. 93 by Rivals and No. 152 by 247Sports.

== College career ==
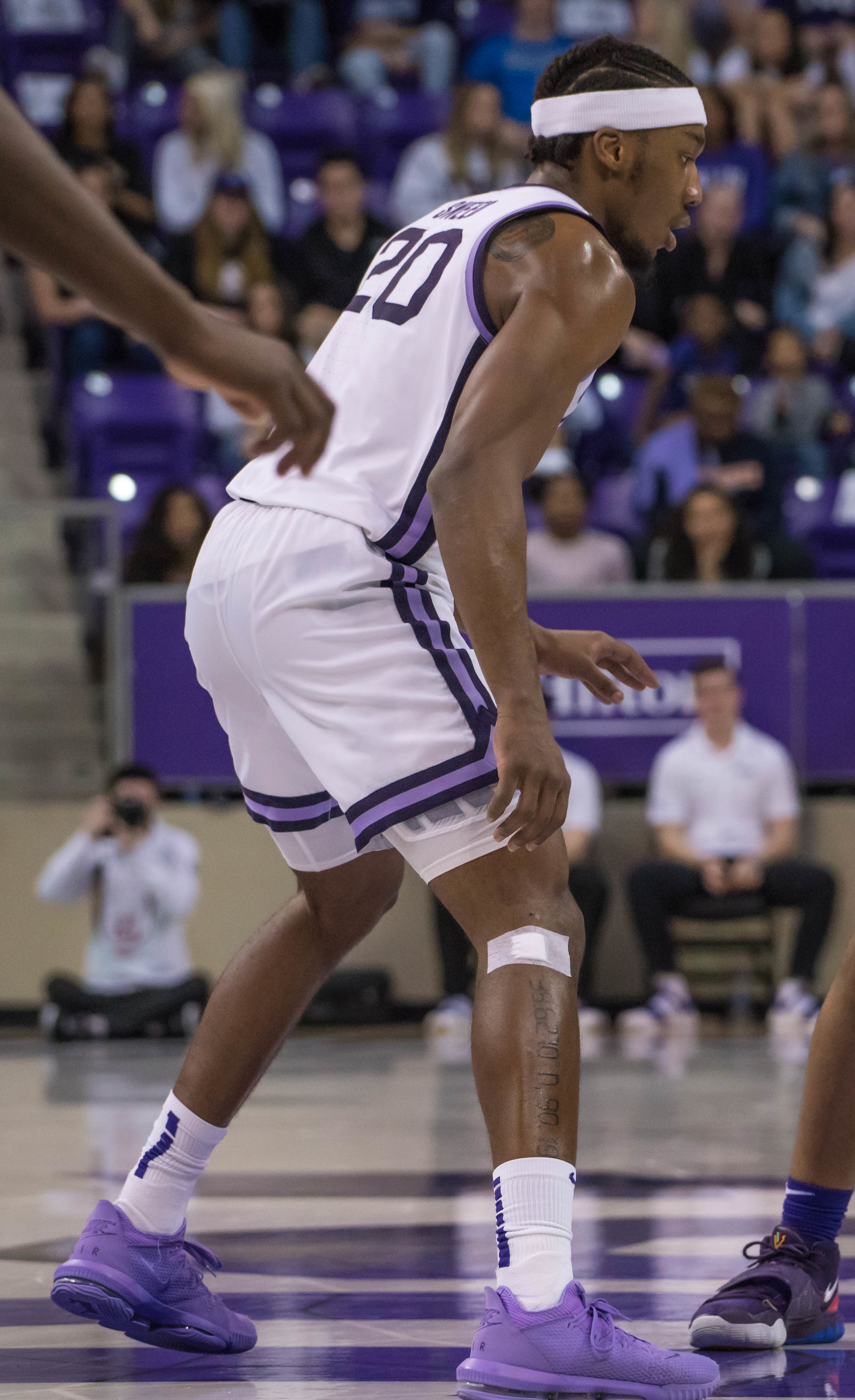
Sneed with K-State in 2020

Sneed played college basketball for Kansas State, where he appeared in 137 contests. Those included 32 games as a senior in 2019–20.

In 2017-18 he averaged 4431 points and 1.6 steals per game (6th in the Big 12 Conference). In 2018-19 he averaged 10.6 points and 1.4 steals per game (8th in the Conference). In 2019–20, he averaged 14.2 points (9th in the Conference), 4.8 rebounds, 1.8 steals (3rd), and 1.7 assists in 32.5 minutes per game, earning an All-Big 12 honorable mention.

== Professional career ==
=== Greensboro Swarm (2021) ===
After going undrafted in the 2020 NBA draft, Sneed signed on November 30, 2020, an Exhibit 10 deal with the Charlotte Hornets and was waived on December 19 after three preseason appearances. On January 27, 2021, he signed as an affiliate player with the Greensboro Swarm of the NBA G League and averaged 8.1 points, 4 rebounds and 1.8 steals in 13 games.

=== Niagara River Lions (2021) ===
On April 7, 2021, Sneed signed with the Niagara River Lions of the Canadian Elite Basketball League where he averaged 17.8 points (3rd in the league), 4.7 rebounds, 2.4 assists, and 1.6 steals (4th).

=== Return to the Swarm / Memphis Grizzlies (2021–2022) ===
On September 20, 2021, Sneed signed another deal with the Hornets. However, he was waived on October 8. On October 24, he re-signed with the Greensboro Swarm. Sneed averaged 10 points, 4 rebounds, 1.6 assists and 1.9 steals per game.

On December 27, 2021, Sneed signed a 10-day contract with the Memphis Grizzlies. After the contract expired, he re-joined the Swarm.

=== Utah Jazz (2022) ===
On February 16, 2022, Sneed signed a two-way contract with the Utah Jazz. He was waived by the Jazz on September 16.

=== Third stint with the Swarm (2022–2023) ===
On November 4, 2022, Sneed was named to the opening night roster for the Greensboro Swarm.

=== Charlotte Hornets (2023) ===
On March 28, 2023, Sneed signed a 10-day contract with the Charlotte Hornets and on April 7, he signed a two-way contract with the Hornets.

Sneed was waived by the Hornets on August 3, 2023.

=== Happy Casa Brindisi (2023–2024) ===
On August 30, 2023, Sneed signed with Happy Casa Brindisi of the Lega Basket Serie A. He scored 16.2 points per game (6th).

=== Bnei Herzliya (2024–2025) ===
In July 2024, Sneed signed with Bnei Herzliya of the Israeli Basketball Premier League.

=== Acqua S.Bernardo Cantù (2025–2026) ===
On August 14, 2025, he signed with Acqua S.Bernardo Cantù of the Italian Lega Basket Serie A (LBA).

=== Hapoel Jerusalem (2026) ===
On May 4, 2026, Sneed signed with Hapoel Jerusalem of the Israeli Ligat HaAl and the EuroCup until the end of the season.

== Career statistics ==
Legend
GP	Games played	GS	Games started	MPG	Minutes per game
FG%	Field goal percentage	3P%	3-point field goal percentage	FT%	Free throw percentage
RPG	Rebounds per game	APG	Assists per game	SPG	Steals per game
BPG	Blocks per game	PPG	Points per game	**Bold**	Career high

=== NBA ===
Year	Team	GP	GS	MPG	FG%	3P%	FT%	RPG	APG	SPG	BPG	PPG
2021–22	Memphis	2	0	4.0	.000	.000	—	1.0	.0	.0	.0	.0
2021–22	Utah	**7**	0	4.4	.250	.167	—	.6	.1	.0	.0	.7
2022–23	Charlotte	4	0	**12.0**	**.500**	**.500**	**1.000**	**1.3**	**1.3**	.0	**.3**	**4.3**
Career		13	0	6.7	.350	.286	1.000	.8	.5	.0	.1	1.7

=== College ===
Year	Team	GP	GS	MPG	FG%	3P%	FT%	RPG	APG	SPG	BPG	PPG
2016–17	Kansas State	35	2	18.3	**.429**	.339	.726	2.6	.6	.9	.2	7.1
2017–18	Kansas State	**37**	**37**	31.4	.417	.344	**.739**	5.1	1.8	1.6	**.3**	11.1
2018–19	Kansas State	33	33	30.7	.396	**.346**	.670	**5.5**	**1.9**	1.4	**.3**	10.6
2019–20	Kansas State	32	32	**32.5**	.365	.304	.690	4.8	1.7	**1.8**	**.3**	**14.2**
Career		137	104	28.1	.397	.332	.703	4.5	1.5	1.4	.3	10.7

== Personal life ==
He is the son of Anthonie and Erica Sneed and has a younger sister, Ania. He earned a degree in organizational management in May 2020.
