= 2022–23 Washington Wizards season =

Season of National Basketball Association team the Washington Wizards

- Head coach: Wes Unseld Jr.
- General manager: Tommy Sheppard
- Owner: Ted Leonsis
- Arena: Capital One Arena

Results
- Record: 35–47 (.427)
- Place: Division: 3rd (Southeast); Conference: 11th (Eastern)
- Playoff finish: Did not qualify
- Stats at Basketball Reference

Local media
- Television: NBC Sports Washington; NBC 4
- Radio: Federal News Radio; 106.7 The Fan

The 2022–23 Washington Wizards season was the 62nd season of the franchise in the National Basketball Association (NBA) and 49th in the Washington, D.C. area.

The Wizards were eliminated from postseason contention for the second straight season on April 2, 2023, with their loss to the New York Knicks and the Atlanta Hawks' win over the Dallas Mavericks. The season also resulted in the firing of Tommy Sheppard as their general manager and team president of basketball operations.

== Draft picks ==
Round	Pick	Player	Position	Nationality	College
1	10	Johnny Davis	Shooting guard	United States	Wisconsin
2	54	Yannick Nzosa	Center	Democratic Republic of the Congo	Unicaja (Spain)

The Wizards entered the 2022 NBA Draft holding one first-round pick and one second-round pick.

== Roster ==
2022–23 Washington Wizards roster
Players

Pos.	No.	Player	Height	Weight	DOB	From
F	9	Deni Avdija	6 ft 9 in (2.06 m)	210 lb (95 kg)	2001-01-03	Israel
G	3	Bradley Beal (injured)	6 ft 4 in (1.93 m)	207 lb (94 kg)	1993-06-28	Florida
F	12	Xavier Cooks	6 ft 8 in (2.03 m)	183 lb (83 kg)	1995-08-19	Winthrop
G	1	Johnny Davis	6 ft 4 in (1.93 m)	195 lb (88 kg)	2002-02-27	Wisconsin
C	21	Daniel Gafford	6 ft 10 in (2.08 m)	234 lb (106 kg)	1998-10-01	Arkansas
F/C	67	Taj Gibson	6 ft 9 in (2.06 m)	232 lb (105 kg)	1985-06-24	USC
F	16	Anthony Gill	6 ft 8 in (2.03 m)	230 lb (104 kg)	1992-10-17	Virginia
G	7	Jordan Goodwin	6 ft 3 in (1.91 m)	200 lb (91 kg)	1998-10-23	Saint Louis
C	34	Jay Huff (TW)	7 ft 1 in (2.16 m)	240 lb (109 kg)	1997-08-25	Virginia
G	29	Quenton Jackson (TW)	6 ft 5 in (1.96 m)	173 lb (78 kg)	1998-09-15	Texas A&M
F	24	Corey Kispert	6 ft 6 in (1.98 m)	224 lb (102 kg)	1999-03-03	Gonzaga
F	33	Kyle Kuzma (injured)	6 ft 9 in (2.06 m)	221 lb (100 kg)	1995-07-24	Utah
G	22	Monté Morris	6 ft 2 in (1.88 m)	183 lb (83 kg)	1995-06-27	Iowa State
G	20	Kendrick Nunn	6 ft 3 in (1.91 m)	190 lb (86 kg)	1995-08-03	Oakland
F/C	6	Kristaps Porziņģis	7 ft 3 in (2.21 m)	240 lb (109 kg)	1995-08-02	Latvia
F	14	Isaiah Todd	6 ft 9 in (2.06 m)	219 lb (99 kg)	2001-10-17	Word of God (NC)
G	55	Delon Wright	6 ft 5 in (1.96 m)	185 lb (84 kg)	1992-04-26	Utah

Coaches
Head coach
- Wes Unseld Jr.
Assistant(s)
- Joseph Blair
- Pat Delany
- Zach Guthrie
- Mike Miller
- James Posey
- Ryan Richman

Legend
- (DP) Unsigned draft pick
- (FA) Free agent
- (S) Suspended
- (GL) On assignment to G League
- (TW) Two-way affiliate player
- Injured

Roster
Updated: March 17, 2023

== Standings ==
=== Division ===
Southeast Division	W	L	PCT	GB	Home	Road	Div	GP
y – Miami Heat	44	38	.537	–	27‍–‍14	17‍–‍24	10–6	82
x – Atlanta Hawks	41	41	.500	3.0	24‍–‍17	17‍–‍24	8–8	82
Washington Wizards	35	47	.427	9.0	19‍–‍22	16‍–‍25	8–8	82
Orlando Magic	34	48	.415	10.0	20‍–‍21	14‍–‍27	7–9	82
Charlotte Hornets	27	55	.329	17.0	13‍–‍28	14‍–‍27	7–9	82

=== Conference ===
Eastern Conference
#	Team	W	L	PCT	GB	GP
1	z – Milwaukee Bucks *	58	24	.707	–	82
2	y – Boston Celtics *	57	25	.695	1.0	82
3	x – Philadelphia 76ers	54	28	.659	4.0	82
4	x – Cleveland Cavaliers	51	31	.622	7.0	82
5	x – New York Knicks	47	35	.573	11.0	82
6	x – Brooklyn Nets	45	37	.549	13.0	82
7	y – Miami Heat *	44	38	.537	14.0	82
8	x – Atlanta Hawks	41	41	.500	17.0	82
9	pi – Toronto Raptors	41	41	.500	17.0	82
10	pi – Chicago Bulls	40	42	.488	18.0	82
11	Indiana Pacers	35	47	.427	23.0	82
12	Washington Wizards	35	47	.427	23.0	82
13	Orlando Magic	34	48	.415	24.0	82
14	Charlotte Hornets	27	55	.329	31.0	82
15	Detroit Pistons	17	65	.207	41.0	82

== Game log ==
=== Preseason ===
2022 preseason game log
Total: 1–3 (Home: 0–1; Road: 1–2)
Preseason: 1–3 (home: 0–1; road: 1–2)

Game	Date	Team	Score	High points	High rebounds	High assists	Location Attendance	Record
1	September 30	Golden State	L 87–96	Rui Hachimura (13)	Rui Hachimura (9)	Monté Morris (5)	Saitama Super Arena; 20,497	0–1
2	October 1	@ Golden State	L 95–104	Kristaps Porziņģis (18)	Rui Hachimura (10)	Delon Wright (6)	Saitama Super Arena; 20,647	0–2
3	October 10	@ Charlotte	W 116–107	Kristaps Porziņģis (20)	Daniel Gafford (7)	Monté Morris (7)	Spectrum Center; 9,478	1–2
4	October 14	@ New York	L 89–105	Rui Hachimura (20)	Rui Hachimura (8)	Bradley Beal (5)	Madison Square Garden; 19,812	1–3

2022–23 season schedule

=== Regular season ===
2022–23 game log
Total: 35–47 (Home: 19–22; Road: 16–25)
October: 3–4 (home: 2–2; road: 1–2)

Game	Date	Team	Score	High points	High rebounds	High assists	Location Attendance	Record
1	October 19	@ Indiana	W 114–107	Bradley Beal (23)	Kyle Kuzma (13)	Beal, Morris (6)	Gainbridge Fieldhouse; 15,027	1–0
2	October 21	Chicago	W 102–100	Kyle Kuzma (26)	Deni Avdija (10)	Bradley Beal (8)	Capital One Arena; 20,476	2–0
3	October 23	@ Cleveland	L 107–117 (OT)	Bradley Beal (27)	Kristaps Porziņģis (11)	Monté Morris (6)	Rocket Mortgage FieldHouse; 19,432	2–1
4	October 25	Detroit	W 120–99	Kyle Kuzma (25)	Avdija, Porziņģis (7)	Beal, Morris (6)	Capital One Arena; 13,196	3–1
5	October 28	Indiana	L 117–127	Bradley Beal (31)	Kyle Kuzma (9)	Monté Morris (12)	Capital One Arena; 13,463	3–2
6	October 30	@ Boston	L 94–112	Kristaps Porziņģis (17)	Kristaps Porziņģis (13)	Bradley Beal (8)	TD Garden; 19,156	3–3
7	October 31	Philadelphia	L 111–118	Kristaps Porziņģis (32)	Kristaps Porziņģis (9)	Bradley Beal (6)	Capital One Arena; 13,746	3–4

November : 8–6 (home: 6–1; road: 2–5)

Game	Date	Team	Score	High points	High rebounds	High assists	Location Attendance	Record
8	November 2	@ Philadelphia	W 121–111	Kristaps Porziņģis (30)	Rui Hachimura (10)	Monté Morris (6)	Wells Fargo Center; 19,855	4–4
9	November 4	Brooklyn	L 86–128	Bradley Beal (20)	Kristaps Porziņģis (10)	Monté Morris (5)	Capital One Arena; 17,258	4–5
10	November 6	@ Memphis	L 97–103	Monté Morris (18)	Kyle Kuzma (11)	Barton, Goodwin (5)	FedExForum; 16,877	4–6
11	November 7	@ Charlotte	W 108–100	Kyle Kuzma (20)	Kristaps Porziņģis (8)	Goodwin, Porziņģis (5)	Spectrum Center; 13,712	5–6
12	November 10	Dallas	W 113–105	Kyle Kuzma (26)	Kyle Kuzma (11)	Goodwin, Kuzma (6)	Capital One Arena; 18,320	6–6
13	November 12	Utah	W 121–112	Kristaps Porziņģis (31)	Kristaps Porziņģis (10)	Monté Morris (9)	Capital One Arena; 13,673	7–6
14	November 13	Memphis	W 102–92	Kristaps Porziņģis (25)	Kyle Kuzma (11)	Monté Morris (6)	Capital One Arena; 17,667	8–6
15	November 16	Oklahoma City	L 120–121	Kristaps Porziņģis (27)	Kyle Kuzma (10)	Kyle Kuzma (9)	Capital One Arena; 12,630	8–7
16	November 18	Miami	W 107–106 (OT)	Bradley Beal (27)	Kristaps Porziņģis (17)	Bradley Beal (8)	Capital One Arena; 18,772	9–7
17	November 20	Charlotte	W 106–102	Kyle Kuzma (28)	Deni Avdija (13)	Beal, Kuzma (5)	Capital One Arena; 14,289	10–7
18	November 23	@ Miami	L 105–113	Kyle Kuzma (33)	Avdija, Porziņģis (9)	Deni Avdija (10)	FTX Arena; 19,600	10–8
19	November 25	@ Miami	L 107–110	Beal, Kuzma (28)	Deni Avdija (9)	Avdija, Beal, Kuzma (5)	FTX Arena; 19,600	10–9
20	November 27	@ Boston	L 121–130	Bradley Beal (30)	Bradley Beal (5)	Monté Morris (8)	TD Garden; 19,156	10–10
21	November 28	Minnesota	W 142–127	Kristaps Porziņģis (41)	Kyle Kuzma (8)	Kyle Kuzma (9)	Capital One Arena; 13,515	11–10
22	November 30	@ Brooklyn	L 107–113	Kristaps Porziņģis (27)	Kristaps Porziņģis (19)	Bradley Beal (6)	Barclays Center; 15,963	11–11

December: 5–10 (home: 2–3; road: 3–7)

Game	Date	Team	Score	High points	High rebounds	High assists	Location Attendance	Record
23	December 2	@ Charlotte	L 116–117	Bradley Beal (33)	Daniel Gafford (12)	Bradley Beal (7)	Spectrum Center; 15,231	11–12
24	December 4	L.A. Lakers	L 119–130	Kristaps Porziņģis (27)	Kristaps Porziņģis (9)	Will Barton (5)	Capital One Arena; 19,647	11–13
25	December 7	@ Chicago	L 111–115	Kristaps Porziņģis (28)	Kristaps Porziņģis (9)	Monté Morris (8)	United Center; 19,265	11–14
26	December 9	@ Indiana	L 111–121	Kristaps Porziņģis (29)	Avdija, Porziņģis (9)	Kyle Kuzma (7)	Gainbridge Fieldhouse; 15,039	11–15
27	December 10	L.A. Clippers	L 107–114	Kyle Kuzma (35)	Kristaps Porziņģis (15)	Goodwin, Porziņģis (6)	Capital One Arena; 18,404	11–16
28	December 12	Brooklyn	L 100–112	Will Barton (22)	Daniel Gafford (10)	Barton, Goodwin (7)	Capital One Arena; 16,090	11–17
29	December 14	@ Denver	L 128–141	Kyle Kuzma (24)	Daniel Gafford (8)	Will Barton (9)	Ball Arena; 19,550	11–18
30	December 17	@ L.A. Clippers	L 93–102	Kristaps Porziņģis (19)	Deni Avdija (10)	Avdija, Morris (5)	Crypto.com Arena; 15,018	11–19
31	December 18	@ L.A. Lakers	L 117–119	Bradley Beal (29)	Kyle Kuzma (16)	Goodwin, Porziņģis (5)	Crypto.com Arena; 18,153	11–20
32	December 20	@ Phoenix	W 113–110	Kyle Kuzma (29)	Deni Avdija (10)	Beal, Kuzma (6)	Footprint Center; 17,071	12–20
33	December 22	@ Utah	L 112–120	Bradley Beal (30)	Rui Hachimura (7)	Bradley Beal (5)	Vivint Arena; 18,206	12–21
34	December 23	@ Sacramento	W 125–111	Kyle Kuzma (32)	Kristaps Porziņģis (13)	Delon Wright (8)	Golden 1 Center; 17,894	13–21
35	December 27	Philadelphia	W 116–111	Kristaps Porziņģis (24)	Kristaps Porziņģis (10)	Monté Morris (7)	Capital One Arena; 20,476	14–21
36	December 28	Phoenix	W 127–102	Rui Hachimura (30)	Daniel Gafford (8)	Monté Morris (8)	Capital One Arena; 20,476	15–21
37	December 30	@ Orlando	W 119–100	Kristaps Porziņģis (30)	Kristaps Porziņģis (13)	Monté Morris (10)	Amway Center; 19,040	16–21

January : 8–5 (home: 2–3; road: 6–2)

Game	Date	Team	Score	High points	High rebounds	High assists	Location Attendance	Record
38	January 1	@ Milwaukee	W 118–95	Rui Hachimura (26)	Kyle Kuzma (13)	Kyle Kuzma (11)	Fiserv Forum; 17,341	17–21
39	January 3	@ Milwaukee	L 113–123	Kristaps Porziņģis (22)	Daniel Gafford (12)	Monté Morris (6)	Fiserv Forum; 17,341	17–22
40	January 6	@ Oklahoma City	L 110–127	Kyle Kuzma (23)	Kristaps Porziņģis (10)	Kyle Kuzma (7)	Paycom Center; 14,790	17–23
41	January 9	New Orleans	L 112–132	Kristaps Porziņģis (23)	Kristaps Porziņģis (10)	Monté Morris (9)	Capital One Arena; 16,223	17–24
42	January 11	@ Chicago	W 100–97	Kyle Kuzma (21)	Deni Avdija (20)	Avdija, Gibson, Kuzma, Morris, Wright (3)	Capital One Arena; 17,032	18–24
43	January 13	New York	L 108–112	Kyle Kuzma (40)	Deni Avdija (9)	Kyle Kuzma (7)	Capital One Arena; 20,476	18–25
44	January 15	Golden State	L 118–127	Kristaps Porziņģis (32)	Kyle Kuzma (11)	Monté Morris (10)	Capital One Arena; 20,476	18–26
45	January 18	@ New York	W 116–105	Kyle Kuzma (27)	Kyle Kuzma (13)	Kyle Kuzma (7)	Madison Square Garden; 19,164	19–26
46	January 21	Orlando	W 138–118	Rui Hachimura (30)	Kyle Kuzma (10)	Beal, Wright (8)	Capital One Arena; 18,171	20–26
47	January 24	@ Dallas	W 127–126	Kyle Kuzma (30)	Deni Avdija (10)	Delon Wright (6)	American Airlines Center; 20,077	21–26
48	January 25	@ Houston	W 108–103	Kyle Kuzma (33)	Deni Avdija (10)	Beal, Nunn, Wright (4)	Toyota Center; 15,302	22–26
49	January 28	@ New Orleans	W 113–103	Daniel Gafford (21)	Daniel Gafford (12)	Beal, Kuzma (5)	Smoothie King Center; 17,692	23–26
50	January 30	@ San Antonio	W 127–106	Deni Avdija (25)	Avdija, Porziņģis (9)	Beal, Porziņģis (7)	AT&T Center; 11,970	24–26

February: 5–6 (home: 2–3; road: 3–3)

Game	Date	Team	Score	High points	High rebounds	High assists	Location Attendance	Record
—	February 1	@ Detroit	Postponed due to ice storm (Rescheduled: March 7)					
51	February 3	Portland	L 116–124	Bradley Beal (34)	Kyle Kuzma (11)	Kuzma, Morris (6)	Capital One Arena; 20,476	24–27
52	February 4	@ Brooklyn	L 123–125	Kristaps Porziņģis (38)	Daniel Gafford (10)	Monté Morris (8)	Barclays Center; 17,732	24–28
53	February 6	Cleveland	L 91–114	Kristaps Porziņģis (18)	Daniel Gafford (8)	Monté Morris (7)	Capital One Arena; 16,744	24–29
54	February 8	Charlotte	W 118–104	Kristaps Porziņģis (36)	Deni Avdija (13)	Beal, Wright (10)	Capital One Arena; 16,097	25–29
55	February 11	Indiana	W 127–113	Bradley Beal (32)	Kristaps Porziņģis (10)	Beal, Nunn (6)	Capital One Arena; 18,387	26–29
56	February 13	@ Golden State	L 126–135	Kristaps Porziņģis (34)	Daniel Gafford (8)	Kendrick Nunn (6)	Chase Center; 18,064	26–30
57	February 14	@ Portland	W 126–101	Kyle Kuzma (33)	Kristaps Porziņģis (12)	Delon Wright (6)	Moda Center; 18,004	27–30
58	February 16	@ Minnesota	W 114–106	Bradley Beal (35)	Deni Avdija (9)	Monté Morris (6)	Target Center; 17,136	28–30
59	February 24	New York	L 109–115	Kuzma, Porziņģis (23)	Deni Avdija (7)	Bradley Beal (8)	Capital One Arena; 20,476	28–31
60	February 26	@ Chicago	L 82–102	Bradley Beal (18)	Daniel Gafford (11)	Bradley Beal (8)	United Center; 21,106	28–32
61	February 28	@ Atlanta	W 119–116	Bradley Beal (37)	Daniel Gafford (12)	Bradley Beal (7)	State Farm Arena; 17,395	29–32

March : 5–11 (home: 4–7; road: 1–4)

Game	Date	Team	Score	High points	High rebounds	High assists	Location Attendance	Record
62	March 2	Toronto	W 119–108	Kyle Kuzma (30)	Deni Avdija (9)	Delon Wright (11)	Capital One Arena; 14,643	30–32
63	March 4	Toronto	L 109–116 (OT)	Kristaps Porziņģis (22)	Kristaps Porziņģis (11)	Bradley Beal (10)	Capital One Arena; 18,174	30–33
64	March 5	Milwaukee	L 111–117	Bradley Beal (33)	Kristaps Porziņģis (13)	Porziņģis, Wright (5)	Capital One Arena; 18,746	30–34
65	March 7	@ Detroit	W 119–117	Bradley Beal (32)	Beal, Gafford, Porziņģis (7)	Bradley Beal (7)	Little Caesars Arena; 17,855	31–34
66	March 7	Atlanta	L 120–122	Kristaps Porziņģis (43)	Kyle Kuzma (10)	Bradley Beal (8)	Capital One Arena; 15,087	31–35
67	March 10	Atlanta	L 107–114	Bradley Beal (27)	Kristaps Porziņģis (9)	Monté Morris (8)	Capital One Arena; 18,161	31–36
68	March 12	Philadelphia	L 93–112	Corey Kispert (25)	Kyle Kuzma (11)	Beal, Kuzma (4)	Wells Fargo Center; 21,220	31–37
69	March 14	Detroit	W 117–97	Bradley Beal (36)	Monté Morris (8)	Bradley Beal (7)	Capital One Arena; 15,279	32–37
70	March 17	@ Cleveland	L 94–117	Bradley Beal (22)	Kristaps Porziņģis (9)	Beal, Morris (5)	Rocket Mortgage FieldHouse; 19,432	32–38
71	March 18	Sacramento	L 118–132	Kyle Kuzma (33)	Deni Avdija (11)	Deni Avdija (6)	Capital One Arena; 18,529	32–39
72	March 21	@ Orlando	L 112–122	Kristaps Porziņģis (30)	Deni Avdija (10)	Monté Morris (8)	Amway Center; 16,096	32–40
73	March 22	Denver	L 104–118	Kristaps Porziņģis (25)	Deni Avdija (8)	Deni Avdija (6)	Capital One Arena; 16,508	32–41
74	March 24	San Antonio	W 136–124	Corey Kispert (26)	Deni Avdija (11)	Deni Avdija (6)	Capital One Arena; 17,004	33–41
75	March 26	@ Toronto	L 104–114	Kristaps Porziņģis (26)	Deni Avdija (9)	Delon Wright (8)	Scotiabank Arena; 19,800	33–42
76	March 28	Boston	W 130–111	Kristaps Porziņģis (32)	Kristaps Porziņģis (13)	Monté Morris (9)	Capital One Arena; 20,476	34–42
77	March 31	Orlando	L 109–116	Corey Kispert (27)	Daniel Gafford (13)	Goodwin, Morris (5)	Capital One Arena; 16,411	34–43

April: 1–4 (home: 1–2; road: 0–2)

Game	Date	Team	Score	High points	High rebounds	High assists	Location Attendance	Record
78	April 2	@ New York	L 109–118	Corey Kispert (29)	Gafford, Goodwin (7)	Delon Wright (7)	Madison Square Garden; 19,812	34–44
79	April 4	Milwaukee	L 128–140	Kendrick Nunn (24)	Jay Huff (9)	Jordan Goodwin (9)	Capital One Arena; 19,098	34–45
80	April 5	@ Atlanta	L 116–134	Daniel Gafford (25)	Daniel Gafford (10)	Jordan Goodwin (6)	State Farm Arena; 17,727	34–46
81	April 7	Miami	W 114–108	Daniel Gafford (22)	Cooks, Goodwin (9)	Gafford, Goodwin, Wright (4)	Capital One Arena; 20,476	35–46
82	April 9	Houston	L 109–114	Jordan Goodwin (22)	Xavier Cooks (14)	Johnny Davis (8)	Capital One Arena; 15,233	35–47

2022–23 season schedule

== Player statistics ==
Legend
GP	Games played	GS	Games started	MPG	Minutes per game
FG%	Field-goal percentage	3P%	3-point field-goal percentage	FT%	Free-throw percentage
RPG	Rebounds per game	APG	Assists per game	SPG	Steals per game
BPG	Blocks per game	PPG	Points per game

=== Regular season ===
Washington Wizards statistics
Player	GP	GS	MPG	FG%	3P%	FT%	RPG	APG	SPG	BPG	PPG
Daniel Gafford	78	47	20.6	.732		.679	5.6	1.1	.4	1.3	9.0
Deni Avdija	76	40	26.6	.437	.297	.739	6.4	2.8	.9	.4	9.2
Corey Kispert	74	45	28.3	.497	.424	.852	2.8	1.2	.4	.1	11.1
Kristaps Porziņģis	65	65	32.6	.498	.385	.851	8.4	2.7	.9	1.5	23.2
Kyle Kuzma	64	64	35.0	.448	.333	.730	7.2	3.7	.6	.5	21.2
Monté Morris	62	61	27.3	.480	.382	.831	3.4	5.3	.7	.2	10.3
Jordan Goodwin	62	7	17.8	.448	.322	.768	3.3	2.7	.9	.4	6.6
Anthony Gill	59	8	10.6	.538	.138	.731	1.7	.6	.1	.2	3.3
Bradley Beal	50	50	33.5	.506	.365	.842	3.9	5.4	.9	.7	23.2
Delon Wright	50	14	24.4	.474	.345	.867	3.6	3.9	1.8	.3	7.4
Taj Gibson	49	2	9.8	.520	.333	.714	1.9	.7	.3	.2	3.4
Will Barton^{†}	40	0	19.6	.386	.377	.778	2.8	2.4	.4	.3	7.7
Kendrick Nunn^{†}	31	0	14.1	.447	.392	.900	1.7	1.8	.5	.1	7.5
Rui Hachimura^{†}	30	0	24.3	.488	.337	.759	4.3	1.2	.4	.4	13.0
Johnny Davis	28	5	15.1	.386	.243	.519	2.3	1.0	.4	.3	5.8
Vernon Carey Jr.	11	0	2.5	.250		1.000	1.0	.3	.2	.2	.5
Xavier Cooks	10	1	12.6	.607	.000	.400	3.8	.6	.6	.4	3.8
Quenton Jackson	9	0	15.0	.452	.083	.773	.9	1.7	.4	.1	6.2
Jay Huff	7	0	13.6	.600	.500	.938	3.0	1.4	.4	.6	7.3
Isaiah Todd	6	1	10.2	.158	.100	1.000	2.0	.7	.2	.0	1.5
Devon Dotson	6	0	8.8	.100	.250		1.7	1.3	.8	.0	.5
Jordan Schakel	2	0	3.0	.500	1.000		.0	.5	.5	.0	1.5
Jamaree Bouyea^{†}	1	0	6.0	.000	.000		1.0	.0	.0	.0	.0

- ^{†} Denotes player spent time with another team in the season. Stats reflect time with the Wizards only.

== Transactions ==
=== Trades ===
July 6, 2022
January 23, 2023
To Washington Wizards

- Will Barton
- Monté Morris
To Washington Wizards

- Kendrick Nunn
- 2023 CHI second-round pick
- 2028 second-round pick
- 2029 second-round pick
To Denver Nuggets

- Kentavious Caldwell-Pope
- Ish Smith
To Los Angeles Lakers

- Rui Hachimura

=== Free agents ===
==== Re-signed ====
Player	Date Signed	Contract	Ref.
Anthony Gill	June 30, 2022	Two-year contract	
Bradley Beal	June 30, 2022	5 years, $251M plus no-trade clause	

==== Additions ====
Player	Date Signed	Contract	Former Team	Ref.
Delon Wright	June 30, 2022	Two-year contract	Atlanta Hawks	
Taj Gibson	July 17, 2022	One-year contract	New York Knicks	
Xavier Cooks	March 17, 2023	Four-year contract	Sydney Kings	

==== Subtractions ====
Player	Reason Left	Date Left	New Team	Ref.
Tomáš Satoranský	UFA	June 20, 2022	Barcelona (Spain)	
Raul Neto	UFA	July 1, 2022	Cleveland Cavaliers	
Thomas Bryant	UFA	July 6, 2022	Los Angeles Lakers	
Cassius Winston	RFA, no offer made	July 28, 2022	Bayern Munich (Germany)	
Devon Dotson	Waived	January 17, 2023	Capital City Go-Go	
Will Barton	Contract buyout	February 21, 2023	Toronto Raptors	
