= 2022–23 Cleveland Cavaliers season =

2022–23 NBA season by team

- Head coach: J. B. Bickerstaff
- President: Koby Altman
- General manager: Mike Gansey
- Owner: Dan Gilbert
- Arena: Rocket Mortgage FieldHouse

Results
- Record: 51–31 (.622)
- Place: Division: 2nd (Central); Conference: 4th (Eastern)
- Playoff finish: First round (lost to Knicks 1–4)
- Stats at Basketball Reference

Local media
- Television: Bally Sports Ohio
- Radio: WTAM · WMMS

The 2022–23 Cleveland Cavaliers season was the 53rd season for the franchise in the National Basketball Association (NBA). The Cavaliers made a blockbuster move to acquire Donovan Mitchell in exchange for Ochai Agbaji, Collin Sexton, Lauri Markkanen and future picks. The team also updated their logo and color scheme, replacing navy blue with the metallic gold they initially used from 1980 to 1983 and from 2003 to 2010.

The Cavaliers matched their win total of the previous season with a 120–104 win over the Charlotte Hornets to improve to 44–27. The Cavaliers qualified for the playoffs for the first time since 2018, and the first time without LeBron James since drafting him. Their season ended in the 1st round where they lost in 5 games to the New York Knicks. This included one game where they only scored 79 points.

== Draft ==
Round	Pick	Player	Position(s)	Nationality	College / Club
1	14	Ochai Agbaji	Shooting guard	United States	University of Kansas
2	39	Khalifa Diop	Center	Senegal	Herbalife Gran Canaria
2	49	Isaiah Mobley	Power forward	United States	University of Southern California
2	56	Luke Travers	Shooting guard	Australia	Perth Wildcats

The Cavaliers owned their first round pick which they used to select Ochai Agbaji. They also had three second-round picks, all acquired through previous trades.

== Roster ==
2022–23 Cleveland Cavaliers roster
Players

Pos.	No.	Player	Height	Weight	DOB	From
C	31	Jarrett Allen	6 ft 11 in (2.11 m)	243 lb (110 kg)	1998-04-21	Texas
F	21	Mamadi Diakite (TW)	6 ft 9 in (2.06 m)	224 lb (102 kg)	1997-01-27	Virginia
G	10	Darius Garland	6 ft 1 in (1.85 m)	192 lb (87 kg)	2000-01-26	Vanderbilt
G	14	Danny Green	6 ft 6 in (1.98 m)	215 lb (98 kg)	1987-06-22	North Carolina
G	3	Caris LeVert	6 ft 6 in (1.98 m)	205 lb (93 kg)	1994-08-25	Michigan
C	33	Robin Lopez	7 ft 0 in (2.13 m)	281 lb (127 kg)	1988-04-01	Stanford
G	5	Sam Merrill	6 ft 4 in (1.93 m)	205 lb (93 kg)	1996-05-15	Utah State
G	45	Donovan Mitchell	6 ft 1 in (1.85 m)	215 lb (98 kg)	1996-09-07	Louisville
F/C	4	Evan Mobley	6 ft 11 in (2.11 m)	215 lb (98 kg)	2001-06-18	USC
F	15	Isaiah Mobley (TW)	6 ft 8 in (2.03 m)	238 lb (108 kg)	1999-09-24	USC
G	19	Raul Neto	6 ft 2 in (1.88 m)	180 lb (82 kg)	1992-05-19	Brazil
G/F	35	Isaac Okoro	6 ft 5 in (1.96 m)	225 lb (102 kg)	2001-01-26	Auburn
F	16	Cedi Osman	6 ft 7 in (2.01 m)	230 lb (104 kg)	1995-04-08	Turkey
G	13	Ricky Rubio	6 ft 3 in (1.91 m)	190 lb (86 kg)	1990-10-21	Spain
F	8	Lamar Stevens	6 ft 6 in (1.98 m)	230 lb (104 kg)	1997-07-09	Penn State
F	32	Dean Wade	6 ft 9 in (2.06 m)	228 lb (103 kg)	1996-11-20	Kansas State
G/F	9	Dylan Windler	6 ft 6 in (1.98 m)	196 lb (89 kg)	1996-09-22	Belmont

Coaches
Head coach
- J. B. Bickerstaff
Assistant(s)
- Greg Buckner (associate HC)
- Dan Geriot
- Antonio Lang
- Sidney Lowe
- J. J. Outlaw
- Nate Reinking
- Luke Walton

Legend
- (DP) Unsigned draft pick
- (FA) Free agent
- (S) Suspended
- (GL) On assignment to G League affiliate
- (TW) Two-way affiliate player
- (10) Signed to 10-day contract
- Injured

Roster
Updated: February 18, 2023

== Standings ==
=== Division ===
Central Division	W	L	PCT	GB	Home	Road	Div	GP
z – Milwaukee Bucks	58	24	.707	–	32‍–‍9	26‍–‍15	11–5	82
x – Cleveland Cavaliers	51	31	.622	7.0	31‍–‍10	20‍–‍21	13–3	82
pi – Chicago Bulls	40	42	.488	18.0	22‍–‍19	18‍–‍23	7–9	82
Indiana Pacers	35	47	.427	23.0	20‍–‍21	15‍–‍26	7–9	82
Detroit Pistons	17	65	.207	41.0	9‍–‍32	8‍–‍33	2–14	82

=== Conference ===
Eastern Conference
#	Team	W	L	PCT	GB	GP
1	z – Milwaukee Bucks *	58	24	.707	–	82
2	y – Boston Celtics *	57	25	.695	1.0	82
3	x – Philadelphia 76ers	54	28	.659	4.0	82
4	x – Cleveland Cavaliers	51	31	.622	7.0	82
5	x – New York Knicks	47	35	.573	11.0	82
6	x – Brooklyn Nets	45	37	.549	13.0	82
7	y – Miami Heat *	44	38	.537	14.0	82
8	x – Atlanta Hawks	41	41	.500	17.0	82
9	pi – Toronto Raptors	41	41	.500	17.0	82
10	pi – Chicago Bulls	40	42	.488	18.0	82
11	Indiana Pacers	35	47	.427	23.0	82
12	Washington Wizards	35	47	.427	23.0	82
13	Orlando Magic	34	48	.415	24.0	82
14	Charlotte Hornets	27	55	.329	31.0	82
15	Detroit Pistons	17	65	.207	41.0	82

== Game log ==
=== Preseason ===
2022 preseason game log
Total: 1–3 (home: 1–1; road: 0–2)
Preseason: 1–3 (home: 1–1; road: 0–2)

Game	Date	Team	Score	High points	High rebounds	High assists	Location Attendance	Record
1	October 5	@ Philadelphia	L 112–113	Donovan Mitchell (16)	Kevin Love (7)	Donovan Mitchell (5)	Wells Fargo Center; 19,793	0–1
2	October 10	Philadelphia	L 97–113	Jarrett Allen (19)	Jarrett Allen (12)	Darius Garland (7)	Rocket Mortgage FieldHouse; 13,648	0–2
3	October 12	Atlanta	W 105–99	Donovan Mitchell (24)	Mamadi Diakite (11)	Darius Garland (12)	Rocket Mortgage FieldHouse; 13,072	1–2
4	October 14	@ Orlando	L 108–114	Isaac Okoro (17)	Cedi Osman (9)	LeVert, I. Mobley, Nembhard (3)	Amway Center; 17,063	1–3

2022–23 preseason schedule

=== Regular season ===
2022–23 game log
Total: 51–31 (home: 31–10; road: 20–21)
October: 5–1 (home: 3–0; road: 2–1)

Game	Date	Team	Score	High points	High rebounds	High assists	Location Attendance	Record
1	October 19	@ Toronto	L 105–108	Donovan Mitchell (31)	Jarrett Allen (10)	Donovan Mitchell (9)	Scotiabank Arena; 19,800	0–1
2	October 22	@ Chicago	W 128–96	Donovan Mitchell (32)	Kevin Love (12)	LeVert, Mitchell (8)	United Center; 21,089	1–1
3	October 23	Washington	W 117–107 (OT)	Donovan Mitchell (37)	Jarrett Allen (14)	LeVert, Mitchell (4)	Rocket Mortgage FieldHouse; 19,432	2–1
4	October 26	Orlando	W 103–92	Evan Mobley (22)	Jarrett Allen (16)	Donovan Mitchell (8)	Rocket Mortgage FieldHouse; 19,432	3–1
5	October 28	@ Boston	W 132–123 (OT)	LeVert, Mitchell (41)	Jarrett Allen (11)	Caris LeVert (7)	TD Garden; 19,156	4–1
6	October 30	New York	W 121–108	Donovan Mitchell (38)	Jarrett Allen (13)	Donovan Mitchell (12)	Rocket Mortgage FieldHouse; 19,432	5–1

November: 9–7 (home: 6–1; road: 3–6)

Game	Date	Team	Score	High points	High rebounds	High assists	Location Attendance	Record
7	November 2	Boston	W 114–113 (OT)	Darius Garland (29)	Jarrett Allen (14)	Darius Garland (12)	Rocket Mortgage FieldHouse; 19,432	6–1
8	November 4	@ Detroit	W 112–88	Jarrett Allen (23)	E. Mobley, Love (8)	Kevin Love (10)	Little Caesars Arena; 18,744	7–1
9	November 6	@ L.A. Lakers	W 114–100	Donovan Mitchell (33)	Jarrett Allen (11)	Darius Garland (7)	Crypto.com Arena; 18,997	8–1
10	November 7	@ L.A. Clippers	L 117–119	Donovan Mitchell (30)	Jarrett Allen (20)	Darius Garland (12)	Crypto.com Arena; 16,516	8–2
11	November 9	@ Sacramento	L 120–127	Donovan Mitchell (38)	Caris LeVert (10)	Darius Garland (8)	Golden 1 Center; 13,816	8–3
12	November 11	@ Golden State	L 101–106	Donovan Mitchell (29)	Evan Mobley (13)	Donovan Mitchell (9)	Chase Center; 18,064	8–4
13	November 13	Minnesota	L 124–129	Darius Garland (51)	Evan Mobley (13)	Darius Garland (6)	Rocket Mortgage FieldHouse; 19,432	8–5
14	November 16	@ Milwaukee	L 98–113	Garland, Mitchell (23)	Love, E. Mobley (7)	Darius Garland (8)	Fiserv Forum; 17,341	8–6
15	November 18	Charlotte	W 132–122 (2OT)	Darius Garland (41)	Evan Mobley (18)	Garland, Mitchell (6)	Rocket Mortgage FieldHouse; 19,432	9–6
16	November 20	Miami	W 113–87	Darius Garland (25)	Cedi Osman (12)	Darius Garland (7)	Rocket Mortgage FieldHouse; 19,432	10–6
17	November 21	Atlanta	W 114–102	Donovan Mitchell (29)	Jarrett Allen (11)	Garland, Mitchell (9)	Rocket Mortgage FieldHouse; 19,432	11–6
18	November 23	Portland	W 114–96	Donovan Mitchell (34)	Jarrett Allen (13)	Darius Garland (12)	Rocket Mortgage FieldHouse; 19,432	12–6
19	November 25	@ Milwaukee	L 102–117	Donovan Mitchell (29)	Dean Wade (12)	Darius Garland (3)	Fiserv Forum; 17,447	12–7
20	November 27	@ Detroit	W 102–94	Donovan Mitchell (32)	Evan Mobley (13)	Darius Garland (10)	Little Caesars Arena; 18,240	13–7
21	November 28	@ Toronto	L 88–100	Garland, Mobley (18)	Evan Mobley (15)	Darius Garland (10)	Scotiabank Arena; 19,800	13–8
22	November 30	Philadelphia	W 113–85	Caris LeVert (22)	Evan Mobley (8)	Darius Garland (9)	Rocket Mortgage FieldHouse; 19,432	14–8

December: 9–6 (home: 7–3; road: 2–3)

Game	Date	Team	Score	High points	High rebounds	High assists	Location Attendance	Record
23	December 2	Orlando	W 107–96	Donovan Mitchell (34)	Evan Mobley (13)	Darius Garland (6)	Rocket Mortgage FieldHouse; 19,432	15–8
24	December 4	@ New York	L 81–92	Donovan Mitchell (23)	Evan Mobley (10)	Donovan Mitchell (5)	Madison Square Garden; 19,007	15–9
25	December 6	L.A. Lakers	W 116–102	Donovan Mitchell (43)	Evan Mobley (12)	Darius Garland (11)	Rocket Mortgage FieldHouse; 19,432	16–9
26	December 9	Sacramento	L 95–106	Caris LeVert (22)	Allen, Stevens (8)	Garland, LeVert (6)	Rocket Mortgage FieldHouse; 19,432	16–10
27	December 10	Oklahoma City	W 110–102	Caris LeVert (22)	Evan Mobley (12)	Darius Garland (8)	Rocket Mortgage FieldHouse; 19,432	17–10
28	December 12	@ San Antonio	L 111–112	Donovan Mitchell (28)	Evan Mobley (13)	Darius Garland (9)	AT&T Center; 13,434	17–11
29	December 14	@ Dallas	W 105–90	Donovan Mitchell (34)	Lamar Stevens (11)	Garland, E. Mobley (6)	American Airlines Center; 20,093	18–11
30	December 16	Indiana	W 118–112	Donovan Mitchell (41)	Evan Mobley (9)	Darius Garland (10)	Rocket Mortgage FieldHouse; 19,432	19–11
31	December 17	Dallas	W 100–99 (OT)	Donovan Mitchell (25)	Jarrett Allen (15)	Darius Garland (12)	Rocket Mortgage FieldHouse; 19,432	20–11
32	December 19	Utah	W 122–99	Donovan Mitchell (23)	Jarrett Allen (11)	Darius Garland (8)	Rocket Mortgage FieldHouse; 19,432	21–11
33	December 21	Milwaukee	W 114–106	Donovan Mitchell (39)	Kevin Love (9)	Donovan Mitchell (6)	Rocket Mortgage FieldHouse; 19,432	22–11
34	December 23	Toronto	L 107–118	Darius Garland (17)	Evan Mobley (8)	Darius Garland (8)	Rocket Mortgage FieldHouse; 19,432	22–12
35	December 26	Brooklyn	L 117–125	Darius Garland (46)	Jarrett Allen (11)	Darius Garland (8)	Rocket Mortgage FieldHouse; 19,432	22–13
36	December 29	@ Indiana	L 126–135	Donovan Mitchell (28)	Jarrett Allen (14)	Darius Garland (8)	Gainbridge Fieldhouse; 17,274	22–14
37	December 31	@ Chicago	W 103–102	Caris LeVert (23)	Jarrett Allen (10)	Donovan Mitchell (6)	United Center; 21,524	23–14

January: 8–8 (home: 5–2; road: 3–6)

Game	Date	Team	Score	High points	High rebounds	High assists	Location Attendance	Record
38	January 2	Chicago	W 145–134 (OT)	Donovan Mitchell (71)	Kevin Love (17)	Donovan Mitchell (11)	Rocket Mortgage FieldHouse; 19,432	24–14
39	January 4	Phoenix	W 90–88	Caris LeVert (21)	Allen, Love, E. Mobley (8)	Donovan Mitchell (9)	Rocket Mortgage FieldHouse; 19,432	25–14
40	January 6	@ Denver	L 108–121	Caris LeVert (22)	Allen, E. Mobley (9)	Darius Garland (8)	Ball Arena; 19,638	25–15
41	January 8	@ Phoenix	W 112–98	Garland, Mitchell (22)	Jarrett Allen (12)	Garland, LeVert (7)	Footprint Center; 17,071	26–15
42	January 10	@ Utah	L 114–116	Donovan Mitchell (46)	Kevin Love (9)	Garland, Mitchell (6)	Vivint Arena; 18,206	26–16
43	January 12	@ Portland	W 119–113	Donovan Mitchell (26)	Jarrett Allen (10)	Darius Garland (10)	Moda Center; 18,312	27–16
44	January 14	@ Minnesota	L 102–110	Allen, E. Mobley (19)	Allen, Love, E. Mobley (8)	Donovan Mitchell (6)	Target Center; 17,136	27–17
45	January 16	New Orleans	W 113–103	Darius Garland (30)	Jarrett Allen (11)	Darius Garland (11)	Rocket Mortgage FieldHouse; 19,432	28–17
46	January 18	@ Memphis	L 114–115	Darius Garland (24)	Evan Mobley (15)	Darius Garland (14)	FedExForum; 16,892	28–18
47	January 20	Golden State	L 114–120	Darius Garland (31)	Jarrett Allen (8)	Darius Garland (10)	Rocket Mortgage FieldHouse; 19,432	28–19
48	January 21	Milwaukee	W 114–102	Evan Mobley (38)	Evan Mobley (9)	Darius Garland (10)	Rocket Mortgage FieldHouse; 19,432	29–19
49	January 24	@ New York	L 103–105	Allen, Mitchell (24)	Jarrett Allen (12)	Donovan Mitchell (8)	Madison Square Garden; 19,812	29–20
50	January 26	@ Houston	W 113–95	Darius Garland (26)	Allen, Mobley (10)	Darius Garland (9)	Toyota Center; 16,327	30–20
51	January 27	@ Oklahoma City	L 100–112	Darius Garland (31)	Evan Mobley (11)	Darius Garland (13)	Paycom Center; 16,236	30–21
52	January 29	L.A. Clippers	W 122–99	Cedi Osman (29)	Evan Mobley (9)	Darius Garland (10)	Rocket Mortgage FieldHouse; 19,432	31–21
53	January 31	Miami	L 97–100	Evan Mobley (19)	Jarrett Allen (11)	Donovan Mitchell (9)	Rocket Mortgage FieldHouse; 19,432	31–22

February: 8–3 (home: 5–1; road: 3–2)

Game	Date	Team	Score	High points	High rebounds	High assists	Location Attendance	Record
54	February 2	Memphis	W 128–113	Darius Garland (32)	Evan Mobley (14)	Darius Garland (11)	Rocket Mortgage FieldHouse; 19,432	32–22
55	February 5	@ Indiana	W 122–103	Darius Garland (24)	Jarrett Allen (13)	Ricky Rubio (9)	Gainbridge Fieldhouse; 17,274	33–22
56	February 6	@ Washington	W 114–91	Allen, Garland (23)	Allen, LeVert (8)	Garland, Mitchell (5)	Capital One Arena; 16,744	34–22
57	February 8	Detroit	W 113–85	Jarrett Allen (20)	Jarrett Allen (14)	Raul Neto (8)	Rocket Mortgage FieldHouse; 19,432	35–22
58	February 10	@ New Orleans	W 118–107	Donovan Mitchell (30)	Evan Mobley (13)	Caris LeVert (9)	Smoothie King Center; 16,398	36–22
59	February 11	Chicago	W 97–89	Donovan Mitchell (29)	Allen, Mitchell (10)	Darius Garland (7)	Rocket Mortgage FieldHouse; 19,432	37–22
60	February 13	San Antonio	W 117–109	Donovan Mitchell (41)	Jarrett Allen (11)	Darius Garland (7)	Rocket Mortgage FieldHouse; 19,432	38–22
61	February 15	@ Philadelphia	L 112–118	Donovan Mitchell (33)	Evan Mobley (9)	Darius Garland (6)	Wells Fargo Center; 21,134	38–23
62	February 23	Denver	L 109–115	Evan Mobley (31)	Jarrett Allen (13)	Caris LeVert (9)	Rocket Mortgage FieldHouse; 19,432	38–24
63	February 24	@ Atlanta	L 119–136	Darius Garland (33)	Jarrett Allen (9)	Neto, Stevens (4)	State Farm Arena; 18,065	38–25
64	February 26	Toronto	W 118–93	Donovan Mitchell (35)	Jarrett Allen (11)	Darius Garland (11)	Rocket Mortgage FieldHouse; 19,432	39–25

March : 9–5 (home: 4–2; road: 5–3)

Game	Date	Team	Score	High points	High rebounds	High assists	Location Attendance	Record
65	March 1	@ Boston	L 113–117	Donovan Mitchell (44)	Evan Mobley (13)	Darius Garland (9)	TD Garden; 19,156	39–26
66	March 4	Detroit	W 114–90	Darius Garland (21)	Evan Mobley (11)	Darius Garland (7)	Rocket Mortgage FieldHouse; 19,432	40–26
67	March 6	Boston	W 118–114 (OT)	Donovan Mitchell (40)	Evan Mobley (17)	Darius Garland (12)	Rocket Mortgage FieldHouse; 19,432	41–26
68	March 8	@ Miami	W 104–100	Darius Garland (25)	Jarrett Allen (12)	Darius Garland (7)	Miami-Dade Arena; 19,600	42–26
69	March 10	@ Miami	L 115–119	Donovan Mitchell (42)	Jarrett Allen (13)	Ricky Rubio (8)	Miami-Dade Arena; 19,757	42–27
70	March 12	@ Charlotte	W 114–108	Darius Garland (28)	Evan Mobley (9)	Darius Garland (6)	Spectrum Center; 17,342	43–27
71	March 14	@ Charlotte	W 120–104	Evan Mobley (26)	Evan Mobley (6)	Garland, LeVert (7)	Spectrum Center; 14,690	44–27
72	March 15	Philadelphia	L 109–118	Caris LeVert (24)	Evan Mobley (12)	Caris LeVert (6)	Rocket Mortgage FieldHouse; 19,432	44–28
73	March 17	Washington	W 117–94	Darius Garland (24)	Evan Mobley (8)	Darius Garland (9)	Rocket Mortgage FieldHouse; 19,432	45–28
74	March 21	@ Brooklyn	W 115–109	Donovan Mitchell (31)	Jarrett Allen (14)	Darius Garland (6)	Barclays Center; 17,732	46–28
75	March 23	@ Brooklyn	W 116–114	Donovan Mitchell (31)	Evan Mobley (16)	Darius Garland (8)	Barclays Center; 17,732	47–28
76	March 26	Houston	W 108–91	Jarrett Allen (24)	Jarrett Allen (14)	Darius Garland (8)	Rocket Mortgage FieldHouse; 19,432	48–28
77	March 28	@ Atlanta	L 118–120	Donovan Mitchell (44)	Evan Mobley (15)	Evan Mobley (6)	State Farm Arena; 17,748	48–29
78	March 31	New York	L 116–130	Donovan Mitchell (42)	Mobley, Stevens (7)	Darius Garland (9)	Rocket Mortgage FieldHouse; 19,432	48–30

April : 3–1 (home: 1–1; road: 2–0)

Game	Date	Team	Score	High points	High rebounds	High assists	Location Attendance	Record
79	April 2	Indiana	W 115–105	Donovan Mitchell (40)	Evan Mobley (16)	Darius Garland (6)	Rocket Mortgage FieldHouse; 19,432	49–30
80	April 4	@ Orlando	W 117–113	Donovan Mitchell (43)	Allen, Mobley (7)	Darius Garland (10)	Amway Center; 19,449	50–30
81	April 6	@ Orlando	W 118–94	Danny Green (21)	Mamadi Diakite (8)	Raul Neto (8)	Amway Center; 19,235	51–30
82	April 9	Charlotte	L 95–106	Sam Merrill (17)	Jarrett Allen (6)	Ricky Rubio (7)	Rocket Mortgage FieldHouse; 19,432	51–31

2022–23 season schedule

=== Playoffs ===
2023 playoff game log
Total: 1–4 (home: 1–2; road: 0–2)
First Round: 1–4 (home: 1–2; road: 0–2)

Game	Date	Team	Score	High points	High rebounds	High assists	Location Attendance	Series
1	April 15	New York	L 97–101	Donovan Mitchell (38)	Jarrett Allen (14)	Donovan Mitchell (8)	Rocket Mortgage FieldHouse; 19,432	0–1
2	April 18	New York	W 107–90	Darius Garland (32)	Evan Mobley (13)	Donovan Mitchell (13)	Rocket Mortgage FieldHouse; 19,432	1–1
3	April 21	@ New York	L 79–99	Donovan Mitchell (22)	Evan Mobley (10)	Donovan Mitchell (5)	Madison Square Garden; 19,812	1–2
4	April 23	@ New York	L 93–102	Darius Garland (23)	Caris LeVert (9)	Darius Garland (10)	Madison Square Garden; 19,812	1–3
5	April 26	New York	L 95–106	Donovan Mitchell (28)	Evan Mobley (9)	Donovan Mitchell (5)	Rocket Mortgage FieldHouse; 19,432	1–4

2023 playoff schedule

== Player statistics ==
=== Regular season ===
Player	Pos.	GP	GS	MP	Reb.	Ast.	Stl.	Blk.	Pts.
Jarrett Allen	C	68	68	2,220	666	113	54	84	969
Mamadi Diakite	PF	22	2	176	30	8	4	9	57
Darius Garland	PG	69	69	2,447	185	538	85	9	1,490
Danny Green^{≠}	SG	8	0	95	10	4	5	3	52
Caris LeVert	SG	74	30	2,237	282	287	72	24	897
Robin Lopez	C	37	2	299	51	19	2	8	112
Kevin Love^{‡}	PF	41	3	821	280	76	7	7	347
Sam Merrill^{≠}	SG	5	0	59	9	5	4	0	25
Donovan Mitchell	SG	68	68	2,432	289	301	99	27	1,922
Evan Mobley	PF	79	79	2,715	711	224	60	119	1,277
Isaiah Mobley	PF	13	0	84	20	3	4	3	31
Raul Neto	PG	48	1	505	46	79	17	4	157
Isaac Okoro	SF	76	46	1,652	187	87	56	30	490
Cedi Osman	SF	77	2	1,548	176	115	35	11	669
Ricky Rubio	PG	33	2	566	70	115	26	6	171
Lamar Stevens	PF	62	25	1,120	207	33	27	19	328
Dean Wade	PF	44	13	891	150	37	28	21	206
Dylan Windler	SF	3	0	10	0	1	1	0	5

After all games.
^{‡}Waived during the season
^{†}Traded during the season
^{≠}Acquired during the season

== Transactions ==
=== Trades ===
June 23, 2022	To Cleveland Cavaliers 2022 No. 49 pick	To Sacramento Kings draft rights to Sasha Vezenkov (2017 No. 57); Cash considerations
September 3, 2022	To Cleveland Cavaliers Donovan Mitchell	To Utah Jazz Collin Sexton; Lauri Markkanen; Ochai Agbaji; 2025 CLE first-round pick 2026 first-round pick swap 2027 CLE first-round pick 2028 first-round pick swap 2029 CLE first-round pick

=== Free agency ===
==== Re-signed ====
Date	Player	Ref.
July 3	RJ Nembhard	

==== Additions ====
Date	Player	Former team	Ref.
July 7	Robin Lopez	Orlando Magic	
July 7	Raul Neto	Washington Wizards	
July 7	Ricky Rubio	Indiana Pacers	

==== Subtractions ====
Date	Player	Reason left	New team	Ref.
July 9	Moses Brown	Free agent	Los Angeles Clippers	
