= 2022–23 Charlotte Hornets season =

North American basketball season

- Head coach: Steve Clifford
- General manager: Mitch Kupchak
- Owner: Michael Jordan
- Arena: Spectrum Center

Results
- Record: 27–55 (.329)
- Place: Division: 5th (Southeast); Conference: 14th (Eastern)
- Playoff finish: Did not qualify
- Stats at Basketball Reference

Local media
- Television: Bally Sports South, Bally Sports Southeast
- Radio: WFNZ

The 2022–23 Charlotte Hornets season was the 33rd season of the franchise in the National Basketball Association (NBA). On April 22, 2022, the Charlotte Hornets fired head coach James Borrego after four years with the team with no playoff appearances. The Hornets failed to improve on their 43–39 record the previous season, with their 40th loss coming on February 5, to Orlando. Additionally, after the Sacramento Kings clinched a playoff spot on March 29, 2023, the Hornets currently hold the distinction for having the longest playoff drought in the NBA with 7 seasons, last clinching in 2016. This later became the final season of Michael Jordan being the majority owner of the Hornets, since he'd later become a minority owner of the team after selling his majority ownership to Gabe Plotkin and Rick Schnall in the month of August 2023.

== Draft ==
| Round | Pick | Player | Position | Nationality | School/club team |
|---|---|---|---|---|---|
| 1 | 13 | Jalen Duren | Center | United States | Memphis |
| 1 | 15 | Mark Williams | Center | United States | Duke |
| 2 | 45 | Josh Minott | Small forward | Jamaica; United States | Memphis |

== Roster ==
2022–23 Charlotte Hornets roster
Players

| Pos. | No. | Player | Height | Weight | DOB | From |
|---|---|---|---|---|---|---|
| G | 1 | LaMelo Ball | 6 ft 7 in (2.01 m) | 180 lb (82 kg) | 2001-08-22 | SPIRE Academy (OH) |
| G | 2 | James Bouknight | 6 ft 4 in (1.93 m) | 190 lb (86 kg) | 2000-09-18 | Connecticut |
| SF | 20 | Gordon Hayward | 6 ft 7 in (2.01 m) | 225 lb (102 kg) | 1990-03-23 | Butler |
| F/C | 23 | Kai Jones | 6 ft 11 in (2.11 m) | 221 lb (100 kg) | 2001-01-19 | Texas |
| G | 9 | Théo Maledon (TW) | 6 ft 4 in (1.93 m) | 175 lb (79 kg) | 2001-06-12 | France |
| F | 11 | Cody Martin | 6 ft 6 in (1.98 m) | 205 lb (93 kg) | 1995-09-28 | Nevada |
| G | 7 | Bryce McGowens | 6 ft 7 in (2.01 m) | 179 lb (81 kg) | 2002-11-08 | Nebraska |
| G/F | 10 | Sviatoslav Mykhailiuk | 6 ft 8 in (2.03 m) | 205 lb (93 kg) | 1997-06-10 | Kansas |
| G/F | 12 | Kelly Jr. Oubre | 6 ft 6 in (1.98 m) | 203 lb (92 kg) | 1995-12-09 | Kansas |
| C | 4 | Nick Richards | 7 ft 0 in (2.13 m) | 245 lb (111 kg) | 1997-11-29 | Kentucky |
| G | 3 | Terry Rozier | 6 ft 1 in (1.85 m) | 190 lb (86 kg) | 1994-03-17 | Louisville |
| G | 14 | Kobi Simmons | 6 ft 5 in (1.96 m) | 180 lb (82 kg) | 1997-07-04 | Arizona |
| G | 8 | Dennis Jr. Smith | 6 ft 2 in (1.88 m) | 205 lb (93 kg) | 1997-11-25 | NC State |
| F | 22 | Xavier Sneed (TW) | 6 ft 6 in (1.98 m) | 215 lb (98 kg) | 1997-12-21 | Kansas State |
| F | 21 | JT Thor | 6 ft 9 in (2.06 m) | 203 lb (92 kg) | 2002-08-26 | Auburn |
| F | 25 | P. J. Washington | 6 ft 7 in (2.01 m) | 230 lb (104 kg) | 1998-08-23 | Kentucky |
| C | 5 | Mark Williams | 7 ft 0 in (2.13 m) | 242 lb (110 kg) | 2001-12-16 | Duke |

Coaches
Head coach
- Steve Clifford
Assistant(s)
- Bob Beyer
- Tyrone Corbin
- Nick Friedman
- Marlon Garnett
- Jay Hernandez
- Norman Richardson
- Bruce Kreutzer
- Rex Walters

Legend
- (DP) Unsigned draft pick
- (FA) Free agent
- (S) Suspended
- (GL) On assignment to G League affiliate
- (TW) Two-way affiliate player
- Injured

Roster
Updated: April 7, 2023

== Standings ==
=== Division ===
| Southeast Division | W | L | PCT | GB | Home | Road | Div | GP |
|---|---|---|---|---|---|---|---|---|
| y – Miami Heat | 44 | 38 | .537 | – | 27‍–‍14 | 17‍–‍24 | 10–6 | 82 |
| x – Atlanta Hawks | 41 | 41 | .500 | 3.0 | 24‍–‍17 | 17‍–‍24 | 8–8 | 82 |
| Washington Wizards | 35 | 47 | .427 | 9.0 | 19‍–‍22 | 16‍–‍25 | 8–8 | 82 |
| Orlando Magic | 34 | 48 | .415 | 10.0 | 20‍–‍21 | 14‍–‍27 | 7–9 | 82 |
| Charlotte Hornets | 27 | 55 | .329 | 17.0 | 13‍–‍28 | 14‍–‍27 | 7–9 | 82 |

=== Conference ===
Eastern Conference
| # | Team | W | L | PCT | GB | GP |
|---|---|---|---|---|---|---|
| 1 | z – Milwaukee Bucks * | 58 | 24 | .707 | – | 82 |
| 2 | y – Boston Celtics * | 57 | 25 | .695 | 1.0 | 82 |
| 3 | x – Philadelphia 76ers | 54 | 28 | .659 | 4.0 | 82 |
| 4 | x – Cleveland Cavaliers | 51 | 31 | .622 | 7.0 | 82 |
| 5 | x – New York Knicks | 47 | 35 | .573 | 11.0 | 82 |
| 6 | x – Brooklyn Nets | 45 | 37 | .549 | 13.0 | 82 |
| 7 | y – Miami Heat * | 44 | 38 | .537 | 14.0 | 82 |
| 8 | x – Atlanta Hawks | 41 | 41 | .500 | 17.0 | 82 |
| 9 | pi – Toronto Raptors | 41 | 41 | .500 | 17.0 | 82 |
| 10 | pi – Chicago Bulls | 40 | 42 | .488 | 18.0 | 82 |
| 11 | Indiana Pacers | 35 | 47 | .427 | 23.0 | 82 |
| 12 | Washington Wizards | 35 | 47 | .427 | 23.0 | 82 |
| 13 | Orlando Magic | 34 | 48 | .415 | 24.0 | 82 |
| 14 | Charlotte Hornets | 27 | 55 | .329 | 31.0 | 82 |
| 15 | Detroit Pistons | 17 | 65 | .207 | 41.0 | 82 |

== Game log ==
=== Preseason ===
2022 preseason game log
Total: 0–5 (Home: 0–3; Road: 0–2)
Preseason: 0–5 (home: 0–3; road: 0–2)

| Game | Date | Team | Score | High points | High rebounds | High assists | Location Attendance | Record |
|---|---|---|---|---|---|---|---|---|
| 1 | October 2 | @ Boston | L 93–134 | Kelly Oubre Jr. (17) | Ball, Richards (7) | LaMelo Ball (4) | TD Garden; 19,156 | 0–1 |
| 2 | October 5 | Indiana | L 97–122 | Terry Rozier (18) | Oubre Jr., Plumlee (9) | LaMelo Ball (7) | Spectrum Center; 9,382 | 0–2 |
| 3 | October 7 | Boston | L 103–112 | LaMelo Ball (23) | Mason Plumlee (10) | LaMelo Ball (9) | Greensboro Coliseum; 16,119 | 0–3 |
| 4 | October 10 | Washington | L 107–116 | Terry Rozier (24) | Nick Richards (8) | LaMelo Ball (3) | Spectrum Center; 9,478 | 0–4 |
| 5 | October 12 | @ Philadelphia | L 94–99 | Gordon Hayward (16) | Hayward, Richards (7) | Mason Plumlee (5) | Wells Fargo Center; 19,778 | 0–5 |

2022–23 season schedule

=== Regular season ===
2022–23 game log
Total: 27–55 (Home: 13–28; Road: 14–27)
October: 3–4 (home: 1–2; road: 2–2)

| Game | Date | Team | Score | High points | High rebounds | High assists | Location Attendance | Record |
|---|---|---|---|---|---|---|---|---|
| 1 | October 19 | @ San Antonio | W 129–102 | Terry Rozier (24) | Nick Richards (10) | Terry Rozier (6) | AT&T Center; 16,236 | 1–0 |
| 2 | October 21 | New Orleans | L 112–124 | Gordon Hayward (26) | Terry Rozier (8) | Terry Rozier (11) | Spectrum Center; 19,287 | 1–1 |
| 3 | October 23 | @ Atlanta | W 126–109 | Kelly Oubre Jr. (24) | Nick Richards (11) | Plumlee, Smith Jr. (6) | State Farm Arena; 17,383 | 2–1 |
| 4 | October 26 | @ New York | L 131–134 (OT) | Gordon Hayward (21) | Gordon Hayward (9) | Dennis Smith Jr. (11) | Madison Square Garden; 19,812 | 2–2 |
| 5 | October 28 | @ Orlando | L 93–113 | Gordon Hayward (18) | Jalen McDaniels (7) | Plumlee, Smith Jr. (4) | Amway Center; 18,846 | 2–3 |
| 6 | October 29 | Golden State | W 120–113 (OT) | P. J. Washington (31) | Jalen McDaniels (11) | Dennis Smith Jr. (8) | Spectrum Center; 19,079 | 3–3 |
| 7 | October 31 | Sacramento | L 108–115 | P. J. Washington (28) | Mason Plumlee (10) | Dennis Smith Jr. (8) | Spectrum Center; 12,020 | 3–4 |

November : 3–11 (home: 2–4; road: 1–7)

| Game | Date | Team | Score | High points | High rebounds | High assists | Location Attendance | Record |
|---|---|---|---|---|---|---|---|---|
| 8 | November 2 | @ Chicago | L 88–106 | Kelly Oubre Jr. (24) | Mason Plumlee (13) | Dennis Smith Jr. (6) | United Center; 17,886 | 3–5 |
| 9 | November 4 | @ Memphis | L 99–130 | Kelly Oubre Jr. (17) | Nick Richards (9) | Bouknight, Smith Jr. (5) | FedExForum; 17,187 | 3–6 |
| 10 | November 5 | Brooklyn | L 94–98 | Terry Rozier (25) | Mason Plumlee (11) | James Bouknight (5) | Spectrum Center; 19,398 | 3–7 |
| 11 | November 7 | Washington | L 100–108 | P. J. Washington (25) | Mason Plumlee (10) | Dennis Smith Jr. (10) | Spectrum Center; 13,712 | 3–8 |
| 12 | November 9 | Portland | L 95–105 | Terry Rozier (18) | Mason Plumlee (12) | Terry Rozier (5) | Spectrum Center; 14,774 | 3–9 |
| 13 | November 10 | @ Miami | L 112–117 | Kelly Oubre Jr. (29) | Mason Plumlee (15) | Dennis Smith Jr. (8) | FTX Arena; 19,600 | 3–10 |
| 14 | November 12 | @ Miami | L 115–132 | Terry Rozier (22) | P. J. Washington (8) | Ball, Rozier (6) | FTX Arena; 19,600 | 3–11 |
| 15 | November 14 | @ Orlando | W 112–105 | Mason Plumlee (18) | Mason Plumlee (10) | LaMelo Ball (9) | Amway Center; 15,018 | 4–11 |
| 16 | November 16 | Indiana | L 113–125 | LaMelo Ball (26) | Mason Plumlee (10) | Terry Rozier (8) | Spectrum Center; 14,756 | 4–12 |
| 17 | November 18 | @ Cleveland | L 122–132 (2OT) | Kelly Oubre Jr. (34) | Nick Richards (14) | Gordon Hayward (7) | Rocket Mortgage FieldHouse; 19,432 | 4–13 |
| 18 | November 20 | @ Washington | L 102–106 | Kelly Oubre Jr. (23) | Nick Richards (10) | Terry Rozier (5) | Capital One Arena; 14,289 | 4–14 |
| 19 | November 23 | Philadelphia | W 107–101 | Terry Rozier (22) | Plumlee, Richards (13) | Plumlee, Rozier (6) | Spectrum Center; 16,910 | 5–14 |
| 20 | November 25 | Minnesota | W 110–108 | Kelly Oubre Jr. (28) | Jones, Plumlee (12) | Terry Rozier (8) | Spectrum Center; 17,924 | 6–14 |
| 21 | November 28 | @ Boston | L 105–140 | Jalen McDaniels (24) | Nick Richards (7) | Théo Maledon (8) | TD Garden; 19,156 | 6–15 |

December: 4–12 (home: 2–6; road: 2–6)

| Game | Date | Team | Score | High points | High rebounds | High assists | Location Attendance | Record |
|---|---|---|---|---|---|---|---|---|
| 22 | December 2 | Washington | W 117–116 | Terry Rozier (25) | Mason Plumlee (10) | Terry Rozier (8) | Spectrum Center; 15,231 | 7–15 |
| 23 | December 3 | Milwaukee | L 96–105 | Terry Rozier (26) | Mason Plumlee (11) | P. J. Washington (5) | Spectrum Center; 18,128 | 7–16 |
| 24 | December 5 | L.A. Clippers | L 117–119 | Kelly Oubre Jr. (28) | Mason Plumlee (12) | Terry Rozier (8) | Spectrum Center; 13,945 | 7–17 |
| 25 | December 7 | @ Brooklyn | L 116–122 | Terry Rozier (29) | Mason Plumlee (11) | P. J. Washington (7) | Barclays Center; 16,903 | 7–18 |
| 26 | December 9 | New York | L 102–121 | Terry Rozier (24) | Mason Plumlee (9) | Terry Rozier (4) | Spectrum Center; 17,696 | 7–19 |
| 27 | December 11 | @ Philadelphia | L 113–131 | Oubre Jr., Rozier (29) | Mason Plumlee (12) | Terry Rozier (6) | Wells Fargo Center; 19,765 | 7–20 |
| 28 | December 14 | Detroit | L 134–141 (OT) | Kelly Oubre Jr. (28) | Mason Plumlee (18) | LaMelo Ball (11) | Spectrum Center; 14,303 | 7–21 |
| 29 | December 16 | Atlanta | L 106–125 | LaMelo Ball (27) | Nick Richards (11) | Terry Rozier (9) | Spectrum Center; 17,772 | 7–22 |
| 30 | December 18 | @ Denver | L 115–119 | LaMelo Ball (31) | Gordon Hayward (10) | LaMelo Ball (5) | Ball Arena; 19,235 | 7–23 |
| 31 | December 19 | @ Sacramento | W 125–119 | Kelly Oubre Jr. (31) | Nick Richards (11) | LaMelo Ball (12) | Golden 1 Center; 17,803 | 8–23 |
| 32 | December 21 | @ L.A. Clippers | L 105–126 | LaMelo Ball (25) | LaMelo Ball (11) | LaMelo Ball (12) | Crypto.com Arena; 19,068 | 8–24 |
| 33 | December 23 | @ L.A. Lakers | W 134–130 | P. J. Washington (24) | Ball, Plumlee (8) | LaMelo Ball (8) | Crypto.com Arena; 18,997 | 9–24 |
| 34 | December 26 | @ Portland | L 113–124 | LaMelo Ball (27) | Mason Plumlee (8) | LaMelo Ball (7) | Moda Center; 19,530 | 9–25 |
| 35 | December 27 | @ Golden State | L 105–110 | LaMelo Ball (21) | Mason Plumlee (13) | Ball, Plumlee, Rozier (4) | Chase Center; 18,064 | 9–26 |
| 36 | December 29 | Oklahoma City | W 121–113 | LaMelo Ball (27) | Mark Williams (13) | LaMelo Ball (9) | Spectrum Center; 19,425 | 10–26 |
| 37 | December 31 | Brooklyn | L 106–123 | LaMelo Ball (23) | Mason Plumlee (10) | LaMelo Ball (11) | Spectrum Center; 19,386 | 10–27 |

January : 5–11 (home: 2–4; road: 3–7)

| Game | Date | Team | Score | High points | High rebounds | High assists | Location Attendance | Record |
|---|---|---|---|---|---|---|---|---|
| 38 | January 2 | L.A. Lakers | L 115–121 | Terry Rozier (27) | Mason Plumlee (14) | LaMelo Ball (6) | Spectrum Center; 19,210 | 10–28 |
| 39 | January 4 | Memphis | L 107–131 | LaMelo Ball (23) | Mason Plumlee (10) | LaMelo Ball (12) | Spectrum Center; 19,077 | 10–29 |
| 40 | January 6 | @ Milwaukee | W 138–109 | Terry Rozier (39) | Mason Plumlee (15) | LaMelo Ball (12) | Fiserv Forum; 17,627 | 11–29 |
| 41 | January 8 | @ Indiana | L 111–116 | P. J. Washington (22) | Mason Plumlee (13) | LaMelo Ball (8) | Gainbridge Fieldhouse; 15,805 | 11–30 |
| 42 | January 10 | @ Toronto | L 120–132 | Terry Rozier (33) | McDaniels, Plumlee (7) | LaMelo Ball (14) | Scotiabank Arena; 19,800 | 11–31 |
| 43 | January 12 | @ Toronto | L 114–124 | LaMelo Ball (32) | Mason Plumlee (15) | Ball, Smith Jr. (7) | Scotiabank Arena; 19,800 | 11–32 |
| 44 | January 14 | Boston | L 106–122 | LaMelo Ball (31) | Mason Plumlee (16) | LaMelo Ball (9) | Spectrum Center; 19,608 | 11–33 |
| 45 | January 16 | Boston | L 118–130 | Jalen McDaniels (26) | Mason Plumlee (12) | Plumlee, Rozier (7) | Spectrum Center; 19,227 | 11–34 |
| 46 | January 18 | @ Houston | W 122–117 | Terry Rozier (26) | Mason Plumlee (9) | Dennis Smith Jr. (7) | Toyota Center; 15,678 | 12–34 |
| 47 | January 21 | @ Atlanta | W 122–118 | Terry Rozier (34) | Mason Plumlee (11) | Dennis Smith Jr. (7) | State Farm Arena; 17,928 | 13–34 |
| 48 | January 23 | @ Utah | L 102–120 | Terry Rozier (23) | Jalen McDaniels (9) | Dennis Smith Jr. (9) | Vivint Arena; 18,206 | 13–35 |
| 49 | January 24 | @ Phoenix | L 97–128 | Terry Rozier (19) | Jalen McDaniels (10) | Terry Rozier (5) | Footprint Center; 17,071 | 13–36 |
| 50 | January 26 | Chicago | W 111–96 | Terry Rozier (28) | Mason Plumlee (12) | LaMelo Ball (8) | Spectrum Center; 17,697 | 14–36 |
| 51 | January 29 | Miami | W 122–117 | Terry Rozier (31) | Mason Plumlee (8) | Ball, Rozier (7) | Spectrum Center; 19,254 | 15–36 |
| 52 | January 31 | @ Milwaukee | L 115–124 | LaMelo Ball (27) | Mason Plumlee (14) | LaMelo Ball (11) | Fiserv Forum; 17,341 | 15–37 |

February : 5–6 (home: 4–2; road: 1–4)

| Game | Date | Team | Score | High points | High rebounds | High assists | Location Attendance | Record |
|---|---|---|---|---|---|---|---|---|
| 53 | February 2 | @ Chicago | L 98–114 | Terry Rozier (23) | Mason Plumlee (11) | LaMelo Ball (6) | United Center; 20,072 | 15–38 |
| 54 | February 3 | @ Detroit | L 112–118 | Ball, Rozier (23) | LaMelo Ball (8) | LaMelo Ball (8) | Little Caesars Arena; 18,007 | 15–39 |
| 55 | February 5 | Orlando | L 113–119 | LaMelo Ball (33) | Mason Plumlee (9) | Ball, Rozier (6) | Spectrum Center; 18,510 | 15–40 |
| 56 | February 8 | @ Washington | L 104–118 | P. J. Washington (20) | Mark Williams (8) | Terry Rozier (6) | Capital One Arena; 16,097 | 15–41 |
| 57 | February 10 | @ Boston | L 116–127 | Terry Rozier (27) | Mark Williams (12) | LaMelo Ball (10) | TD Garden; 19,156 | 15–42 |
| 58 | February 11 | Denver | L 105–119 | P. J. Washington (22) | LaMelo Ball (9) | LaMelo Ball (12) | Spectrum Center; 19,256 | 15–43 |
| 59 | February 13 | Atlanta | W 144–138 | LaMelo Ball (30) | P. J. Washington (7) | LaMelo Ball (15) | Spectrum Center; 14,078 | 16–43 |
| 60 | February 15 | San Antonio | W 120–110 | LaMelo Ball (28) | LaMelo Ball (12) | LaMelo Ball (10) | Spectrum Center; 14,155 | 17–43 |
| 61 | February 24 | @ Minnesota | W 121–113 | LaMelo Ball (32) | Gordon Hayward (13) | LaMelo Ball (8) | Target Center; 17,136 | 18–43 |
| 62 | February 25 | Miami | W 108–103 | Gordon Hayward (21) | Mark Williams (20) | LaMelo Ball (13) | Spectrum Center; 19,109 | 19–43 |
| 63 | February 27 | Detroit | W 117–106 | Terry Rozier (22) | Mark Williams (11) | Dennis Smith Jr. (7) | Spectrum Center; 14,184 | 20–43 |

March : 6–9 (home: 2–7; road: 4–2)

| Game | Date | Team | Score | High points | High rebounds | High assists | Location Attendance | Record |
|---|---|---|---|---|---|---|---|---|
| 64 | March 1 | Phoenix | L 91–105 | Kelly Oubre Jr. (26) | Mark Williams (10) | Dennis Smith Jr. (6) | Spectrum Center; 19,137 | 20–44 |
| 65 | March 3 | Orlando | L 106–117 | Kelly Oubre Jr. (29) | Kelly Oubre Jr. (10) | Gordon Hayward (7) | Spectrum Center; 16,683 | 20–45 |
| 66 | March 5 | @ Brooklyn | L 86–102 | Kelly Oubre Jr. (17) | Mark Williams (14) | Dennis Smith Jr. (6) | Barclays Center; 17,921 | 20–46 |
| 67 | March 7 | @ New York | W 112–105 | Kelly Oubre Jr. (27) | Gordon Hayward (9) | Gordon Hayward (8) | Madison Square Garden; 19,812 | 21–46 |
| 68 | March 9 | @ Detroit | W 113–103 | Kelly Oubre Jr. (27) | Nick Richards (10) | Terry Rozier (9) | Little Caesars Arena; 17,121 | 22–46 |
| 69 | March 11 | Utah | L 111–119 | Kelly Oubre Jr. (24) | Nick Richards (8) | Terry Rozier (8) | Spectrum Center; 17,221 | 22–47 |
| 70 | March 12 | Cleveland | L 108–114 | Terry Rozier (27) | Nick Richards (12) | Dennis Smith Jr. (7) | Spectrum Center; 17,342 | 22–48 |
| 71 | March 14 | Cleveland | L 104–120 | Kelly Oubre Jr. (28) | Nick Richards (8) | Terry Rozier (9) | Spectrum Center; 14,690 | 22–49 |
| 72 | March 17 | Philadelphia | L 82–121 | Terry Rozier (14) | Kai Jones (9) | Dennis Smith Jr. (8) | Spectrum Center; 19,096 | 22–50 |
| 73 | March 20 | Indiana | W 115–109 | Kelly Oubre Jr. (28) | Nick Richards (17) | Terry Rozier (9) | Spectrum Center; 12,449 | 23–50 |
| 74 | March 23 | @ New Orleans | L 96–115 | P. J. Washington (18) | Nick Richards (14) | Hayward, McGowens (6) | Smoothie King Center; 15,749 | 23–51 |
| 75 | March 24 | @ Dallas | W 117–109 | P. J. Washington (28) | Nick Richards (11) | Hayward, Smith Jr. (9) | American Airlines Center; 20,347 | 24–51 |
| 76 | March 26 | Dallas | W 110–104 | Gordon Hayward (22) | Mark Williams (16) | Dennis Smith Jr. (6) | Spectrum Center; 19,264 | 25–51 |
| 77 | March 28 | @ Oklahoma City | W 137–134 | P. J. Washington (43) | Kai Jones (14) | Théo Maledon (9) | Paycom Center; 15,428 | 26–51 |
| 78 | March 31 | Chicago | L 91–121 | James Bouknight (22) | Mark Williams (8) | Théo Maledon (9) | Spectrum Center; 18,768 | 26–52 |

April: 1–3 (home: 0–3; road: 1–0)

| Game | Date | Team | Score | High points | High rebounds | High assists | Location Attendance | Record |
|---|---|---|---|---|---|---|---|---|
| 79 | April 2 | Toronto | L 108–128 | Sviatoslav Mykhailiuk (26) | Mark Williams (12) | Théo Maledon (14) | Spectrum Center; 16,052 | 26–53 |
| 80 | April 4 | Toronto | L 100–120 | Bryce McGowens (20) | Nick Richards (11) | Théo Maledon (11) | Spectrum Center; 14,965 | 26–54 |
| 81 | April 7 | Houston | L 109–112 | Sviatoslav Mykhailiuk (25) | Mark Williams (13) | Théo Maledon (8) | Spectrum Center; 19,102 | 26–55 |
| 82 | April 9 | @ Cleveland | W 106–95 | McGowens, Williams (22) | Mark Williams (10) | Maledon, Mykhailiuk (6) | Rocket Mortgage FieldHouse; 19,432 | 27–55 |

2022–23 season schedule

== Player statistics ==
=== Regular season ===
| Player | POS | GP | GS | MP | REB | AST | STL | BLK | PTS | MPG | RPG | APG | SPG | BPG | PPG |
|---|---|---|---|---|---|---|---|---|---|---|---|---|---|---|---|
| P. J. Washington | PF | 73 | 73 | 2,380 | 358 | 175 | 66 | 79 | 1,144 | 32.6 | 4.9 | 2.4 | .9 | 1.1 | 15.7 |
| JT Thor | PF | 69 | 8 | 969 | 152 | 36 | 22 | 23 | 262 | 14.0 | 2.2 | .5 | .3 | .3 | 3.8 |
| Nick Richards | C | 65 | 9 | 1,217 | 416 | 38 | 11 | 71 | 532 | 18.7 | 6.4 | .6 | .2 | 1.1 | 8.2 |
| Terry Rozier | SG | 63 | 63 | 2,221 | 259 | 319 | 74 | 16 | 1,329 | 35.3 | 4.1 | 5.1 | 1.2 | .3 | 21.1 |
| Mason Plumlee^{†} | C | 56 | 56 | 1,597 | 541 | 205 | 35 | 35 | 685 | 28.5 | 9.7 | 3.7 | .6 | .6 | 12.2 |
| Jalen McDaniels^{†} | SF | 56 | 21 | 1,494 | 270 | 111 | 66 | 29 | 595 | 26.7 | 4.8 | 2.0 | 1.2 | .5 | 10.6 |
| Dennis Smith Jr. | PG | 54 | 15 | 1,390 | 167 | 261 | 75 | 25 | 474 | 25.7 | 3.1 | 4.8 | 1.4 | .5 | 8.8 |
| Gordon Hayward | SF | 50 | 50 | 1,577 | 215 | 206 | 42 | 12 | 733 | 31.5 | 4.3 | 4.1 | .8 | .2 | 14.7 |
| Kelly Oubre Jr. | SF | 48 | 40 | 1,548 | 249 | 54 | 68 | 18 | 972 | 32.3 | 5.2 | 1.1 | 1.4 | .4 | 20.3 |
| Bryce McGowens | SG | 46 | 7 | 787 | 93 | 54 | 15 | 6 | 246 | 17.1 | 2.0 | 1.2 | .3 | .1 | 5.3 |
| Kai Jones | C | 46 | 0 | 550 | 123 | 15 | 17 | 30 | 157 | 12.0 | 2.7 | .3 | .4 | .7 | 3.4 |
| Théo Maledon | PG | 44 | 7 | 854 | 123 | 152 | 37 | 12 | 295 | 19.4 | 2.8 | 3.5 | .8 | .3 | 6.7 |
| Mark Williams | C | 43 | 17 | 828 | 304 | 18 | 28 | 45 | 387 | 19.3 | 7.1 | .4 | .7 | 1.0 | 9.0 |
| LaMelo Ball | PG | 36 | 36 | 1,268 | 231 | 304 | 46 | 11 | 838 | 35.2 | 6.4 | 8.4 | 1.3 | .3 | 23.3 |
| James Bouknight | SG | 34 | 0 | 515 | 72 | 41 | 14 | 5 | 191 | 15.1 | 2.1 | 1.2 | .4 | .1 | 5.6 |
| Sviatoslav Mykhailiuk^{†} | SF | 19 | 8 | 428 | 46 | 52 | 14 | 4 | 201 | 22.5 | 2.4 | 2.7 | .7 | .2 | 10.6 |
| Cody Martin | SF | 7 | 0 | 134 | 24 | 11 | 4 | 1 | 35 | 19.1 | 3.4 | 1.6 | .6 | .1 | 5.0 |
| Kobi Simmons | SG | 5 | 0 | 28 | 4 | 5 | 0 | 2 | 5 | 5.6 | .8 | 1.0 | .0 | .4 | 1.0 |
| Xavier Sneed | SF | 4 | 0 | 48 | 5 | 5 | 0 | 1 | 17 | 12.0 | 1.3 | 1.3 | .0 | .3 | 4.3 |

- ^{†} Denotes player spent time with another team in the season. Stats reflect time with the Hornets only.

== Transactions ==
=== Trades ===
| June 23, 2022 | Three-team trade | |
| June 23, 2022 | To Charlotte Hornets 2023 first-round pick 2023 second-round pick 2023 second-round pick 2023 second-round pick 2024 second-round pick | To Detroit Pistons Draft rights to Jalen Duren; Kemba Walker |
| June 23, 2022 | To New York Knicks 2023 first-round pick 2025 first-round pick | |
| June 23, 2022 | To Charlotte Hornets Draft rights to Bryce McGowens | To Minnesota Timberwolves Draft rights to Josh Minott; 2023 second-round pick |
| February 9, 2023 | Four-team trade | |
| February 9, 2023 | To Charlotte Hornets Svi Mykhailiuk; 2023 PHI second-round pick 2027 POR second-round pick | To Philadelphia 76ers Jalen McDaniels; 2024 CHA second-round pick 2029 POR second-round pick |
| February 9, 2023 | To Portland Trail Blazers Cam Reddish; Matisse Thybulle; Ryan Arcidiacono; 2023 NYK protected first-round pick | To New York Knicks Josh Hart |

=== Free agency ===
==== Re-signed ====
| Player | Signed |
|---|---|
| Cody Martin | 4-year contract worth $31 million |

==== Additions ====
| Player | Signed | Former Team |
|---|---|---|
| Jalen Crutcher | Exhibit 10 contract | University of Dayton |
| Anthony Duruji | Exhibit 10 contract | University of Florida |
| Jaylen Sims | Exhibit 10 contract | University of North Carolina Wilmington |
| Isaiah Whaley | Exhibit 10 contract | University of Connecticut |
| Dennis Smith Jr. | 1-year contract worth $2.1 million | Portland Trail Blazers |
| LiAngelo Ball | 1-year contract worth $1 million | Greensboro Swarm |
| Xavier Sneed | Exhibit 10 contract | Utah Jazz |
| Théo Maledon | Two-way contract | Houston Rockets |
| Ty-Shon Alexander | Exhibit 10 contract | (Italy) Pallacanestro Trieste |

==== Subtractions ====
| Player | Reason left | New Team |
|---|---|---|
| Isaiah Thomas | Not resigned | |
| Arnoldas Kulboka | 1-year contract | (Greece) Promitheas Patras B.C. |
| Scottie Lewis | Qualifying offer expired | |
| Montrezl Harrell | 2-year contract worth $5.2 million | Philadelphia 76ers |
| Miles Bridges | Not resigned (Qualifying offer expired) | Charlotte Hornets |
| Isaiah Whaley | Waived | Greensboro Swarm |
| Anthony Duruji | Waived | Greensboro Swarm |
| Jaylen Sims | Waived | Greensboro Swarm |
| Ty-Shon Alexander | Waived | Greensboro Swarm |
| LiAngelo Ball | Waived | Greensboro Swarm |
| Jalen Crutcher | Waived | Greensboro Swarm |
| Xavier Sneed | Waived | Greensboro Swarm |
