= Mark Williams (basketball) =

American basketball player (born 2001)

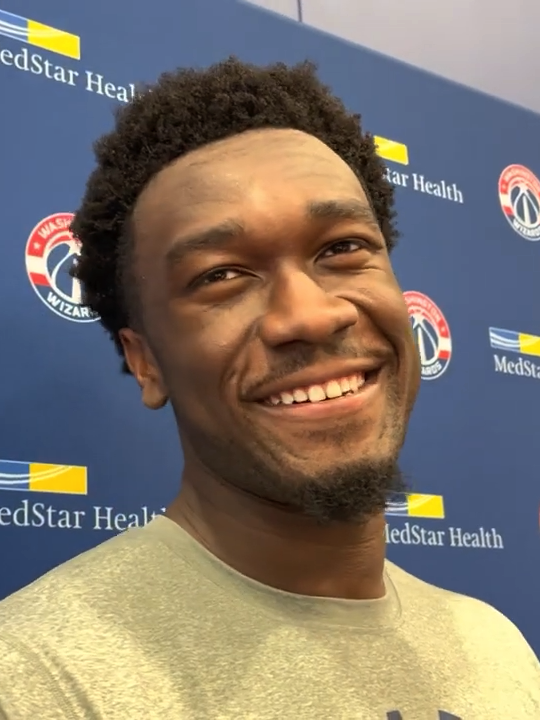
- Williams in 2022

No. 25 – Phoenix Suns
- Position: Center
- League: NBA

Personal information
- Born: December 16, 2001 (age 24) Norfolk, Virginia, U.S.
- Listed height: 7 ft 1 in (2.16 m)
- Listed weight: 240 lb (109 kg)

Career information
- High school: Norfolk Academy (Norfolk, Virginia); IMG Academy (Bradenton, Florida)
- College: Duke (2020–2022)
- NBA draft: 2022: 1st round, 15th overall pick
- Drafted by: Charlotte Hornets
- Playing career: 2022–present

Career history
- 2022–2025: Charlotte Hornets
- 2022: →Greensboro Swarm
- 2025–present: Phoenix Suns

Career highlights
- ACC Defensive Player of the Year (2022); ACC All-Defensive Team (2022); Third-team All-ACC (2022); McDonald's All-American (2020)
- Stats at NBA.com
- Stats at Basketball Reference

Mark Oluwafemi Williams (born December 16, 2001) is an American professional basketball player for the Phoenix Suns of the National Basketball Association (NBA). He played college basketball for the Duke Blue Devils. Williams was selected by the Charlotte Hornets in the first round of the 2022 NBA draft with the 15th overall pick. After three full seasons with the Hornets as their starting center, Williams was traded to the Los Angeles Lakers in February 2025 before the trade got rescinded causing him to return to Charlotte before he was traded again to Phoenix during the 2025 offseason.

== High school career ==
Williams began his high school basketball career at Norfolk Academy. He was invited to the NBA Top 100 camp in Charlottesville, Virginia, in the summer of 2018. Williams passed the 1,000 point threshold in February 2019. As a junior, he averaged 19.7 points, 11.2 rebounds and 3.7 blocks per game to help the Bulldogs reach the VISAA state tournament. He was selected to the USA Today All-USA Virginia Boys Basketball second team. During the 2019 Nike EYBL, Williams averaged 14.8 points, 8.9 rebounds and 2.1 blocks per game, while shooting 63.8% from the floor. During the Nike Peach Jam in July 2019, Williams averaged 23.5 points, 12 rebounds and 2.5 blocks per game while shooting 76.0 percent in two games for the Boo Williams program. Coming into his senior season, he transferred to IMG Academy, which finished the previous season as the GEICO Nationals champions. Williams was named a 2020 McDonald's All-American. On January 31, 2020, he posted 19 points and 16 rebounds in a 64–62 win over Hillcrest Prep.

=== Recruiting ===
Williams was considered a five-star recruit by 247Sports and Rivals, and a four-star recruit by ESPN in the 2020 class. On November 1, 2019, he committed to playing college basketball for Duke University, choosing the Blue Devils over Michigan and UCLA after taking official visits to all three schools. Williams chose Duke in large part due to the possibility for a national championship, and said he wanted to pattern his game after Wendell Carter Jr.

College recruiting
Name	Hometown	School	Height	Weight	Commit date
Mark Williams; C	Virginia Beach, VA	IMG Academy (FL)	7 ft 0 in (2.13 m)	230 lb (100 kg)	Nov 1, 2019
Mark Williams; C	Recruit ratings: Rivals: 247Sports: ESPN: (89)				
Overall recruit ranking: Rivals: 31 247Sports: 18 ESPN: 32
Note: In many cases, Scout, Rivals, 247Sports, On3, and ESPN may conflict in their listings of height and weight.; In these cases, the average was taken. ESPN grades are on a 100-point scale.; Sources: "Duke Blue Devils 2020 Basketball Commitments". Rivals.; "2020 Duke Blue Devils Recruiting Class". ESPN.; "2020 Team Ranking". Rivals.

== College career ==
=== Freshman season (2020–2021) ===
Before the start of the season, Williams was named to the Kareem Abdul-Jabbar Award preseason watch list. On January 30, 2021, he scored 11 points and grabbed 5 rebounds in a 79–53 win over Clemson. On February 13, 2021, Williams recorded 13 points and 5 blocks in a 69–53 victory against NC State. On February 22, 2021, he tallied 18 points and 11 rebounds in a 85–71 win over Syracuse. On March 10, 2021, Williams recorded another double-double of 23 points and 19 rebounds in a 70–56 victory against Louisville in the second round of the ACC tournament. In that game his 19 rebounds set a record for the most ever by a freshman in the ACC Tournament, surpassing former Virginia center and NBA Hall of Famer Ralph Sampson's 18 rebounds against Clemson in the 1980 ACC Tournament and ranking the third highest for a freshman at Duke. Williams earned All-ACC Tournament second-team honors after averaging 18.0 points and 10.0 rebounds per game. As a freshman, Williams averaged 7.1 points and 4.5 rebounds per game.

=== Sophomore season (2021–2022) ===
On January 5, 2022, Williams scored 14 points and 10 rebounds in a 69–57 win against Georgia Tech. On February 26, 2022, he scored a career-high 28 points in a 97–72 win over Syracuse. Williams was named ACC Defensive Player of the Year as well as Third Team All-ACC as a sophomore. As a sophomore, he averaged 11.2 points, 7.4 rebounds and 2.8 blocks per game. Williams had a very productive sophomore season, his 110 blocked shots ranked fourth-most in a single season in Blue Devil history and his 142 career blocks ranked seventh all time in Duke history. Williams also had a shooting percentage of .721, which ranked the second best in Duke history and was the only player in the country 700+ from both the floor and free throw line.

On April 18, 2022, Williams declared for the 2022 NBA draft, forgoing his remaining college eligibility.

== Professional career ==
=== Charlotte Hornets (2022–2025) ===
==== Rookie season: 2022–2023 ====
Williams was selected in the 2022 NBA draft with the 15th overall pick by the Charlotte Hornets.

On February 10, 2023, after the team's starting center, Mason Plumlee, was traded, Williams earned his first career start and posted a double-double with 11 points and 12 rebounds in a loss to the Boston Celtics. On February 25, 2023, Williams put up a career-high 18 points and a career-high 20 rebounds in a 108–103 win over the Miami Heat.

==== 2023–2024 season ====
On November 10, 2023, Williams scored 21 points and a career-high 24 rebounds, with 15 of his rebounds being a career high and Hornets record for offensive rebounds in a game, in a 124–117 win over the Washington Wizards. Williams injured his back in a late November game against the Brooklyn Nets and played only 19 games during his second season.

==== 2024–2025 season ====
On January 15, 2025, Williams scored a career-high 31 points, along with 13 rebounds, in a 117–112 win over the Utah Jazz. On February 6, 2025, Williams was traded to the Los Angeles Lakers in exchange for Dalton Knecht, Cam Reddish, one unprotected first-round pick, and one first-round pick swap. However, just two days later on February 8, it was reported that the trade had been rescinded after Williams failed his physical exam, returning Williams to the Hornets.

=== Phoenix Suns (2025–present) ===
On June 30, 2025, Williams was traded to the Phoenix Suns in exchange for Vasilije Micić, the draft rights to Liam McNeeley, and a 2029 first-round pick. He made 60 appearances (including 55 starts) for Phoenix during the 2025–26 season, recording averages of 11.7 points, 8.0 rebounds, and 1.0 assists.

On June 25, 2026, Williams re-signed with the Suns on a three-year, $38 million contract. On September 11, Williams was ruled out for at least five months after undergoing surgery to repair a torn labrum in his left shoulder.

== Career statistics ==
Legend
GP	Games played	GS	Games started	MPG	Minutes per game
FG%	Field goal percentage	3P%	3-point field goal percentage	FT%	Free throw percentage
RPG	Rebounds per game	APG	Assists per game	SPG	Steals per game
BPG	Blocks per game	PPG	Points per game	**Bold**	Career high

=== NBA ===
Year	Team	GP	GS	MPG	FG%	3P%	FT%	RPG	APG	SPG	BPG	PPG
2022–23	Charlotte	43	17	19.3	.637	—	.691	7.1	.4	.7	1.0	9.0
2023–24	Charlotte	19	19	**26.7**	**.649**	—	.719	9.7	1.2	.8	1.1	12.7
2024–25	Charlotte	44	41	26.6	.604	.000	**.804**	**10.2**	**2.5**	.7	**1.2**	**15.3**
2025–26	Phoenix	**60**	**55**	23.6	.644	**1.000**	.771	8.0	1.0	**.9**	.9	11.7
Career		166	132	23.6	.629	.200	.760	8.5	1.2	.8	1.0	12.0

=== College ===
Year	Team	GP	GS	MPG	FG%	3P%	FT%	RPG	APG	SPG	BPG	PPG
2020–21	Duke	23	15	15.2	.664	—	.537	4.5	.7	**.6**	1.4	7.1
2021–22	Duke	**39**	**39**	**23.6**	**.721**	.000	**.727**	**7.4**	**.9**	.5	**2.8**	**11.2**
Career		62	54	20.5	.704	.000	.661	6.3	.8	.5	2.3	9.7

== Personal life ==
Williams was born to Nigerian parents, Margaret and Dr. Alex Williams, on December 16, 2001. His father is a physician with a subspecialty in gastroenterology. Williams has two older sisters, Victoria and Elizabeth. Elizabeth played college basketball at Duke from 2011 to 2015 before being selected fourth in the 2015 WNBA draft.
