= 2022–23 Los Angeles Clippers season =

- Head coach: Tyronn Lue
- General manager: Michael Winger
- Owner: Steve Ballmer
- Arena: Crypto.com Arena

Results
- Record: 44–38 (.537)
- Place: Division: 3rd (Pacific); Conference: 5th (Western)
- Playoff finish: First round (lost to Suns 1–4)
- Stats at Basketball Reference

Local media
- Television: Bally Sports West; Bally Sports SoCal; KTLA
- Radio: KLAC

The 2022–23 Los Angeles Clippers season was the 53rd season of the franchise in the National Basketball Association (NBA), their 45th season in Southern California and their 39th season in Los Angeles. Despite improving from last season and reaching the playoffs, they failed to get past the first round due to a number of injuries.

== Draft ==
Round	Pick	Player	Position	Nationality	College/Club
2	43	Moussa Diabaté	Center	France	Michigan

The Clippers entered this draft with their own second-round pick. They have traded their original first-round pick, which would land 12th following the draft lottery, to the Oklahoma City Thunder in 2019 as an exchange for Paul George.

== Roster ==
2022–23 Los Angeles Clippers roster
Players

Pos.	No.	Player	Height	Weight	DOB	From
G/F	33	Nicolas Batum	6 ft 8 in (2.03 m)	230 lb (104 kg)	1988-12-14	France
G	4	Brandon Boston Jr.	6 ft 6 in (1.98 m)	188 lb (85 kg)	2001-11-28	Kentucky
G/F	7	Amir Coffey	6 ft 7 in (2.01 m)	210 lb (95 kg)	1997-06-17	Minnesota
F	23	Robert Covington	6 ft 7 in (2.01 m)	209 lb (95 kg)	1990-12-14	Tennessee State
C	25	Moussa Diabaté (TW)	6 ft 11 in (2.11 m)	210 lb (95 kg)	2002-01-21	Michigan
G/F	13	Paul George	6 ft 8 in (2.03 m)	220 lb (100 kg)	1990-05-02	Fresno State
G/F	10	Eric Gordon	6 ft 4 in (1.93 m)	215 lb (98 kg)	1988-12-25	Indiana
G	5	Bones Hyland	6 ft 2 in (1.88 m)	173 lb (78 kg)	2000-09-14	VCU
G/F	2	Kawhi Leonard	6 ft 7 in (2.01 m)	225 lb (102 kg)	1991-06-29	San Diego State
G/F	14	Terance Mann	6 ft 5 in (1.96 m)	215 lb (98 kg)	1996-10-18	Florida State
G	15	Xavier Moon (TW)	6 ft 2 in (1.88 m)	165 lb (75 kg)	1995-01-02	Morehead State
F	8	Marcus Sr. Morris	6 ft 9 in (2.06 m)	228 lb (103 kg)	1989-09-02	Kansas
C	44	Mason Plumlee	7 ft 0 in (2.13 m)	254 lb (115 kg)	1990-03-05	Duke
G	24	Norman Powell	6 ft 4 in (1.93 m)	215 lb (98 kg)	1993-05-25	UCLA
G	1	Jason Preston	6 ft 3 in (1.91 m)	181 lb (82 kg)	1999-08-10	Ohio
G	0	Russell Westbrook	6 ft 3 in (1.91 m)	200 lb (91 kg)	1988-11-12	UCLA
C	40	Ivica Zubac	7 ft 0 in (2.13 m)	240 lb (109 kg)	1997-03-18	Croatia

Coaches
Head coach
- Tyronn Lue
Assistant(s)
- Jeremy Castleberry
- Dan Craig (associate HC)
- Larry Drew
- Shaun Fein
- Jay Larranaga
- Brendan O'Connor
- Brian Shaw

Legend
- (DP) Unsigned draft pick
- (FA) Free agent
- (S) Suspended
- (GL) On assignment to G League affiliate
- (TW) Two-way affiliate player
- Injured

Roster
Updated: March 4, 2023

=== Roster notes ===
- Guard Eric Gordon makes his second tour of duty with team having played for them from 2008 to 2011.
- Guard Russell Westbrook is the 31st former Lakers player to play for the Clippers.

== Standings ==
=== Division ===
Pacific Division	W	L	PCT	GB	Home	Road	Div	GP
y – Sacramento Kings	48	34	.585	–	23‍–‍18	25‍–‍16	9–7	82
x – Phoenix Suns	45	37	.549	3.0	28‍–‍13	17‍–‍24	9–7	82
x – Los Angeles Clippers	44	38	.537	4.0	23‍–‍18	21‍–‍20	9–7	82
x – Golden State Warriors	44	38	.537	4.0	33‍–‍8	11‍–‍30	7–9	82
x – Los Angeles Lakers	43	39	.524	5.0	23‍–‍18	20‍–‍21	6–10	82

=== Conference ===
Western Conference
#	Team	W	L	PCT	GB	GP
1	c – Denver Nuggets *	53	29	.646	–	82
2	y – Memphis Grizzlies *	51	31	.622	2.0	82
3	y – Sacramento Kings *	48	34	.585	5.0	82
4	x – Phoenix Suns	45	37	.549	8.0	82
5	x – Los Angeles Clippers	44	38	.537	9.0	82
6	x – Golden State Warriors	44	38	.537	9.0	82
7	x – Los Angeles Lakers	43	39	.524	10.0	82
8	x – Minnesota Timberwolves	42	40	.512	11.0	82
9	pi – New Orleans Pelicans	42	40	.512	11.0	82
10	pi – Oklahoma City Thunder	40	42	.488	13.0	82
11	Dallas Mavericks	38	44	.463	15.0	82
12	Utah Jazz	37	45	.451	16.0	82
13	Portland Trail Blazers	33	49	.402	20.0	82
14	Houston Rockets	22	60	.268	31.0	82
15	San Antonio Spurs	22	60	.268	31.0	82

== Game log ==
=== Preseason ===
2022 preseason game log
Total: 2–2 (home: 2–2; road: 0–0)
Preseason: 2–2 (home: 2–2; road: 0–0)

Game	Date	Team	Score	High points	High rebounds	High assists	Location Attendance	Record
1	September 30	Maccabi Ra'anana	W 121–81	Luke Kennard (16)	Moses Brown (13)	Jason Preston (10)	Climate Pledge Arena; 9,333	1–0
2	October 3	Portland	W 102–97	Amir Coffey (15)	Moussa Diabaté (11)	Xavier Moon (4)	Climate Pledge Arena; 18,440	2–0
3	October 9	Minnesota	L 117–119	John Wall (20)	Ivica Zubac (8)	Paul George (4)	Crypto.com Arena; 16,466	2–1
4	October 12	Denver	L 115–126	Norman Powell (34)	Paul George (6)	George, Wall (4)	Toyota Arena (Ontario); 8,812	2–2

2022–23 season schedule

=== Regular season ===
2022–23 game log
Total: 44–38 (home: 23–18; road: 21–20)
October: 3–4 (home: 1–2; road: 2–2)

Game	Date	Team	Score	High points	High rebounds	High assists	Location Attendance	Record
1	October 20	at L.A. Lakers	W 103–97	George, Wall (15)	Ivica Zubac (17)	George, Jackson (4)	Crypto.com Arena (LAL); 18,997	1–0
2	October 22	at Sacramento	W 111–109	Paul George (40)	Ivica Zubac (8)	Paul George (6)	Golden 1 Center; 16,296	2–0
3	October 23	Phoenix	L 95–112	Marcus Morris Sr. (22)	Ivica Zubac (8)	George, Wall (4)	Crypto.com Arena; 19,068	2–1
4	October 25	at Oklahoma City	L 94–108	Luke Kennard (15)	Ivica Zubac (14)	Reggie Jackson (6)	Paycom Center; 13,105	2–2
5	October 27	at Oklahoma City	L 110–118	Norman Powell (21)	Ivica Zubac (18)	Reggie Jackson (4)	Paycom Center; 14,510	2–3
6	October 30	New Orleans	L 91–112	Norman Powell (18)	Marcus Morris Sr. (8)	John Wall (6)	Crypto.com Arena; 18,142	2–4
7	October 31	Houston	W 95–93	Paul George (35)	Ivica Zubac (12)	Paul George (8)	Crypto.com Arena; 14,887	3–4

November : 10–6 (home: 6–3; road: 4–3)

Game	Date	Team	Score	High points	High rebounds	High assists	Location Attendance	Record
8	November 2	at Houston	W 109–101	Paul George (28)	Marcus Morris Sr. (10)	Paul George (5)	Toyota Center; 15,860	4–4
9	November 4	at San Antonio	W 113–106	Paul George (35)	Ivica Zubac (15)	John Wall (6)	AT&T Center; 12,603	5–4
10	November 6	Utah	L 102–110	Paul George (34)	Ivica Zubac (9)	John Wall (6)	Crypto.com Arena; 16,111	5–5
11	November 7	Cleveland	W 119–117	Paul George (26)	Ivica Zubac (9)	Reggie Jackson (7)	Crypto.com Arena; 16,516	6–5
12	November 9	L.A. Lakers	W 114–101	Paul George (29)	Morris Sr., Zubac (8)	John Wall (6)	Crypto.com Arena (LAC); 19,068	7–5
13	November 12	Brooklyn	L 95–110	Paul George (17)	Ivica Zubac (15)	Jackson, Wall (6)	Crypto.com Arena; 17,777	7–6
14	November 14	at Houston	W 122–106	Paul George (22)	Paul George (8)	Reggie Jackson (6)	Toyota Center; 16,098	8–6
15	November 15	at Dallas	L 101–104	Paul George (23)	George, Zubac (7)	Paul George (6)	American Airlines Center; 19,810	8–7
16	November 17	Detroit	W 96–91	Reggie Jackson (23)	Ivica Zubac (18)	Leonard, Wall (4)	Crypto.com Arena; 17,822	9–7
17	November 19	San Antonio	W 119–97	Norman Powell (26)	Ivica Zubac (11)	John Wall (15)	Crypto.com Arena; 18,581	10–7
18	November 21	Utah	W 121–114	Norman Powell (30)	Ivica Zubac (14)	John Wall (8)	Crypto.com Arena; 19,068	11–7
19	November 23	at Golden State	L 107–124	Marcus Morris Sr. (19)	Norman Powell (7)	Amir Coffey (7)	Chase Center; 18,064	11–8
20	November 25	Denver	L 104–114	John Wall (23)	Ivica Zubac (9)	Reggie Jackson (8)	Crypto.com Arena; 16,559	11–9
21	November 27	Indiana	W 114–100	Ivica Zubac (31)	Ivica Zubac (29)	John Wall (8)	Crypto.com Arena; 16,805	12–9
22	November 29	at Portland	W 118–112	Norman Powell (32)	Ivica Zubac (13)	Reggie Jackson (12)	Moda Center; 17,251	13–9
23	November 30	at Utah	L 112–125	John Wall (26)	Moussa Diabaté (8)	John Wall (5)	Vivint Arena; 18,206	13–10

December: 8–7 (home: 4–2; road: 4–5)

Game	Date	Team	Score	High points	High rebounds	High assists	Location Attendance	Record
24	December 3	Sacramento	L 96–123	Brandon Boston Jr. (18)	Ivica Zubac (15)	Robert Covington (4)	Crypto.com Arena; 16,587	13–11
25	December 5	at Charlotte	W 119–117	Paul George (19)	Ivica Zubac (8)	John Wall (12)	Spectrum Center; 13,945	14–11
26	December 7	at Orlando	L 111–116 (OT)	Terance Mann (19)	Ivica Zubac (13)	Batum, George (5)	Amway Center; 14,429	14–12
27	December 8	at Miami	L 110–115	Paul George (29)	George, Zubac (8)	John Wall (8)	FTX Arena; 19,600	14–13
28	December 10	at Washington	W 114–107	Paul George (36)	George, Leonard (8)	George, Leonard (6)	Capital One Arena; 18,404	15–13
29	December 12	Boston	W 113–93	Paul George (26)	Kawhi Leonard (9)	Kawhi Leonard (6)	Crypto.com Arena; 19,068	16–13
30	December 14	Minnesota	W 99–88	Kawhi Leonard (19)	Paul George (11)	Paul George (11)	Crypto.com Arena; 14,068	17–13
31	December 15	Phoenix	L 95–111	Terance Mann (22)	Moses Brown (12)	John Wall (5)	Crypto.com Arena; 15,778	17–14
32	December 17	Washington	W 102–93	Kawhi Leonard (31)	Marcus Morris Sr. (12)	Mann, Wall (6)	Crypto.com Arena; 15,018	18–14
33	December 21	Charlotte	W 126–105	Paul George (22)	George, Zubac (8)	Paul George (8)	Crypto.com Arena; 19,068	19–14
34	December 23	at Philadelphia	L 114–119	Kawhi Leonard (28)	Ivica Zubac (12)	Kawhi Leonard (5)	Wells Fargo Center; 19,996	19–15
35	December 26	at Detroit	W 142–131 (OT)	Paul George (32)	Ivica Zubac (15)	Paul George (11)	Little Caesars Arena; 20,190	20–15
36	December 27	at Toronto	W 124–113	George, Zubac (23)	Ivica Zubac (16)	Kawhi Leonard (8)	Scotiabank Arena; 19,800	21–15
37	December 29	at Boston	L 110–116	Kawhi Leonard (26)	Ivica Zubac (11)	Paul George (6)	TD Garden; 19,156	21–16
38	December 31	at Indiana	L 130–131	Paul George (45)	Paul George (9)	Kawhi Leonard (7)	Gainbridge Fieldhouse; 16,731	21–17

January: 8–8 (home: 3–4; road: 5–4)

Game	Date	Team	Score	High points	High rebounds	High assists	Location Attendance	Record
39	January 2	Miami	L 100–110	Paul George (25)	Morris Sr., Zubac (7)	Paul George (7)	Crypto.com Arena; 19,068	21–18
40	January 5	at Denver	L 91–122	Norman Powell (13)	Moses Brown (10)	Brandon Boston Jr. (4)	Ball Arena; 19,087	21–19
41	January 6	at Minnesota	L 115–128	Norman Powell (21)	Moses Brown (11)	John Wall (8)	Target Center; 17,136	21–20
42	January 8	Atlanta	L 108–112	Kawhi Leonard (29)	Ivica Zubac (18)	John Wall (5)	Crypto.com Arena; 19,068	21–21
43	January 10	Dallas	W 113–101	Kawhi Leonard (33)	Kawhi Leonard (9)	Leonard, Wall (4)	Crypto.com Arena; 19,068	22–21
44	January 13	Denver	L 103–115	Kawhi Leonard (24)	Kawhi Leonard (8)	Leonard, Mann, Wall (4)	Crypto.com Arena; 16,005	22–22
45	January 15	Houston	W 121–100	Terance Mann (31)	Brown, Leonard, Mann (6)	Reggie Jackson (5)	Crypto.com Arena; 17,238	23–22
46	January 17	Philadelphia	L 110–120	Kawhi Leonard (27)	Ivica Zubac (9)	George, Jackson, Mann (4)	Crypto.com Arena; 15,155	23–23
47	January 18	at Utah	L 103–126	Norman Powell (30)	Ivica Zubac (12)	Terance Mann (5)	Vivint Arena; 18,206	23–24
48	January 20	at San Antonio	W 131–126	Kawhi Leonard (36)	Ivica Zubac (16)	Paul George (12)	AT&T Center; 15,190	24–24
49	January 22	at Dallas	W 112–98	Kawhi Leonard (30)	Leonard, Zubac (9)	Robert Covington (5)	American Airlines Center; 20,026	25–24
50	January 24	at L.A. Lakers	W 133–115	Paul George (27)	George, Leonard (9)	Nicolas Batum (6)	Crypto.com Arena; 19,068	26–24
51	January 26	San Antonio	W 138–100	Paul George (35)	Robert Covington (7)	George, Leonard (7)	Crypto.com Arena; 19,068	27–24
52	January 28	at Atlanta	W 120–113	Kawhi Leonard (32)	Kawhi Leonard (8)	Paul George (6)	State Farm Arena; 18,448	28–24
53	January 29	at Cleveland	L 99–122	Brandon Boston Jr. (24)	Moses Brown (16)	Jason Preston (8)	Rocket Mortgage Fieldhouse; 19,432	28–25
54	January 31	at Chicago	W 108–103	Kawhi Leonard (33)	Ivica Zubac (12)	Paul George (7)	United Center; 20,068	29–25

February : 4–6 (home: 1–4; road: 3–2)

Game	Date	Team	Score	High points	High rebounds	High assists	Location Attendance	Record
55	February 2	at Milwaukee	L 105–106	Norman Powell (26)	Ivica Zubac (13)	Kawhi Leonard (5)	Fiserv Forum; 17,341	29–26
56	February 4	at New York	W 134–128 (OT)	Kawhi Leonard (35)	Ivica Zubac (13)	Paul George (5)	Madison Square Garden; 19,812	30–26
57	February 6	at Brooklyn	W 124–116	Paul George (29)	Ivica Zubac (12)	Kawhi Leonard (6)	Barclays Center; 16,981	31–26
58	February 8	Dallas	L 104–110	Norman Powell (24)	Ivica Zubac (10)	George, Leonard, Mann, Morris Sr. (4)	Crypto.com Arena; 18,377	31–27
59	February 10	Milwaukee	L 106–119	Brandon Boston Jr. (20)	Paul George (11)	Paul George (6)	Crypto.com Arena; 16,614	31–28
60	February 14	Golden State	W 134–124	Kawhi Leonard (33)	Kawhi Leonard (7)	Paul George (8)	Crypto.com Arena; 16,741	32–28
61	February 16	at Phoenix	W 116–107	George, Mann (26)	Ivica Zubac (12)	Eric Gordon (7)	Footprint Center; 17,071	33–28
62	February 24	Sacramento	L 175–176 (2OT)	Kawhi Leonard (44)	George, Plumlee (10)	Russell Westbrook (14)	Crypto.com Arena; 19,068	33–29
63	February 26	@ Denver	L 124–134 (OT)	Kawhi Leonard (33)	Mason Plumlee (10)	George, Westbrook (4)	Ball Arena; 19,689	33–30
64	February 28	Minnesota	L 101–108	Paul George (25)	Plumlee, Zubac (9)	Russell Westbrook (10)	Crypto.com Arena; 17,022	33–31

March : 8–6 (home: 6–3; road: 2–3)

Game	Date	Team	Score	High points	High rebounds	High assists	Location Attendance	Record
65	March 2	at Golden State	L 91–115	Kawhi Leonard (21)	Mason Plumlee (20)	Russell Westbrook (6)	Chase Center; 18,064	33–32
66	March 3	at Sacramento	L 127–128	Paul George (28)	Mason Plumlee (8)	Russell Westbrook (10)	Golden 1 Center; 18,111	33–33
67	March 5	Memphis	W 135–129	Paul George (42)	Paul George (11)	Russell Westbrook (6)	Crypto.com Arena; 19,068	34–33
68	March 8	Toronto	W 108–100	Kawhi Leonard (24)	Kawhi Leonard (12)	Russell Westbrook (7)	Crypto.com Arena; 19,068	35–33
69	March 11	New York	W 106–95	Kawhi Leonard (38)	Paul George (8)	Paul George (8)	Crypto.com Arena; 19,068	36–33
70	March 15	Golden State	W 134–124	Kawhi Leonard (30)	Ivica Zubac (16)	George, Westbrook (7)	Crypto.com Arena; 19,068	37–33
71	March 18	Orlando	L 108–113	Paul George (30)	Ivica Zubac (16)	Russell Westbrook (9)	Crypto.com Arena; 17,533	37–34
72	March 19	at Portland	W 117–102	Paul George (29)	Russell Westbrook (12)	Russell Westbrook (10)	Moda Center; 18,714	38–34
73	March 21	Oklahoma City	L 100–101	Kawhi Leonard (21)	Mason Plumlee (12)	George, Leonard (5)	Crypto.com Arena; 19,068	38–35
74	March 23	Oklahoma City	W 127–105	Kawhi Leonard (32)	Ivica Zubac (10)	Hyland, Westbrook (7)	Crypto.com Arena; 19,068	39–35
75	March 25	New Orleans	L 110–131	Bones Hyland (18)	Kawhi Leonard (6)	Bones Hyland (7)	Crypto.com Arena; 17,700	39–36
76	March 27	Chicago	W 124–112	Nicolas Batum (24)	Leonard, Zubac (7)	Russell Westbrook (10)	Crypto.com Arena; 19,068	40–36
77	March 29	at Memphis	W 141–132	Russell Westbrook (36)	Ivica Zubac (7)	Russell Westbrook (10)	FedExForum; 16,775	41–36
78	March 31	at Memphis	L 94–108	Norman Powell (16)	Ivica Zubac (15)	Russell Westbrook (11)	FedExForum; 16,376	41–37

April : 3–1 (home: 2–0; road: 1–1)

Game	Date	Team	Score	High points	High rebounds	High assists	Location Attendance	Record
79	April 1	at New Orleans	L 114–122	Kawhi Leonard (40)	Kawhi Leonard (8)	Russell Westbrook (9)	Smoothie King Center; 18,399	41–38
80	April 5	L.A. Lakers	W 125–118	Norman Powell (27)	Ivica Zubac (13)	Hyland, Leonard, Powell, Westbrook (4)	Crypto.com Arena; 19,068	42–38
81	April 8	Portland	W 136–125	Kawhi Leonard (27)	Ivica Zubac (10)	Russell Westbrook (6)	Crypto.com Arena; 19,068	43–38
82	April 9	at Phoenix	W 119–114	Norman Powell (29)	Kawhi Leonard (15)	Russell Westbrook (8)	Footprint Center; 17,071	44–38

2022–23 season schedule

=== Playoffs ===
2023 playoff game log
Total: 1–4 (home: 0–2; road: 1–2)
First Round: 1–4 (home: 0–2; road: 1–2)

Game	Date	Team	Score	High points	High rebounds	High assists	Location Attendance	Series
1	April 16	@ Phoenix	W 115–110	Kawhi Leonard (38)	Ivica Zubac (15)	Russell Westbrook (8)	Footprint Center; 17,071	1–0
2	April 18	@ Phoenix	L 109–123	Kawhi Leonard (31)	Kawhi Leonard (8)	Kawhi Leonard (7)	Footprint Center; 17,071	1–1
3	April 20	Phoenix	L 124–129	Norman Powell (42)	Westbrook, Zubac (8)	Russell Westbrook (12)	Crypto.com Arena; 19,068	1–2
4	April 22	Phoenix	L 100–112	Russell Westbrook (37)	Ivica Zubac (9)	Mann, Westbrook (4)	Crypto.com Arena; 19,068	1–3
5	April 25	@ Phoenix	L 130–136	Norman Powell (27)	Plumlee, Zubac (10)	Russell Westbrook (8)	Footprint Center; 17,071	1–4

2023 playoff schedule

== Player statistics ==
Legend
GP	Games played	GS	Games started	MPG	Minutes per game
FG%	Field-goal percentage	3P%	3-point field-goal percentage	FT%	Free-throw percentage
RPG	Rebounds per game	APG	Assists per game	SPG	Steals per game
BPG	Blocks per game	PPG	Points per game

=== Regular season ===
Player	GP	GS	MPG	FG%	3P%	FT%	RPG	APG	SPG	BPG	PPG
Terance Mann	81	36	23.1	.519	.389	.780	3.4	2.3	.5	.3	8.8
Nicolas Batum	78	19	21.9	.420	.391	.708	3.8	1.6	.7	.6	6.1
Ivica Zubac	76	76	28.6	.634	.000	.697	9.9	1.0	.4	1.3	10.8
Marcus Morris Sr.	65	65	28.1	.426	.364	.782	4.0	1.8	.6	.3	11.2
Norman Powell	60	8	26.1	.479	.397	.812	2.9	1.8	.8	.3	17.0
Paul George	56	56	34.6	.457	.371	.871	6.1	5.1	1.5	.4	23.8
Kawhi Leonard	52	50	33.6	.512	.416	.871	6.5	3.9	1.4	.5	23.8
Reggie Jackson^{†}	52	38	25.7	.418	.350	.924	2.2	3.5	.7	.1	10.9
Amir Coffey	50	9	12.5	.386	.275	.778	1.1	1.1	.1	.1	3.4
Robert Covington	48	0	16.2	.445	.397	.750	3.5	1.2	.8	.7	6.0
Luke Kennard^{†}	35	11	20.7	.464	.447	.950	2.4	1.1	.5	.1	7.8
John Wall	34	3	22.2	.408	.303	.681	2.7	5.2	.8	.4	11.4
Moses Brown^{†}	34	1	8.5	.635		.458	4.1	.1	.1	.4	4.6
Mason Plumlee^{†}	23	4	19.9	.727		.772	6.9	1.7	.5	.5	7.5
Eric Gordon^{†}	22	11	24.9	.463	.423	.842	1.7	2.1	.6	.4	11.0
Brandon Boston Jr.	22	1	11.3	.418	.414	.763	1.4	.9	.4	.0	6.5
Moussa Diabaté	22	1	8.9	.511	.500	.625	2.3	.2	.3	.4	2.7
Russell Westbrook^{†}	21	21	30.2	.489	.356	.658	4.9	7.6	1.1	.5	15.8
Bones Hyland^{†}	14	0	18.9	.401	.351	.750	3.5	3.4	.8	.1	10.8
Jason Preston	14	0	8.9	.439	.278	.000	1.6	1.9	.1	.0	2.9
Xavier Moon	4	0	5.0	.333	.333		.8	1.3	.0	.0	1.8

=== Playoffs ===
Player	GP	GS	MPG	FG%	3P%	FT%	RPG	APG	SPG	BPG	PPG
Russell Westbrook	5	5	38.4	.410	.357	.880	7.6	7.4	1.2	1.4	23.6
Eric Gordon	5	5	29.8	.409	.345	.833	1.4	2.6	.6	.4	10.2
Ivica Zubac	5	5	26.0	.567		.750	9.6	.6	.6	.2	9.2
Norman Powell	5	3	33.4	.474	.406	.774	3.0	2.2	.8	.4	21.8
Nicolas Batum	5	3	18.4	.421	.353		2.2	1.2	.4	.4	4.4
Terance Mann	5	0	26.6	.576	.474	.667	3.2	2.2	.8	.2	10.6
Mason Plumlee	5	0	18.2	.875		.929	6.8	1.8	.4	.4	8.2
Bones Hyland	5	0	16.4	.341	.250	.800	.8	.8	.8	.2	8.6
Marcus Morris Sr.	3	2	22.7	.345	.167	1.000	4.0	.0	.3	.3	8.7
Kawhi Leonard	2	2	40.0	.545	.600	.882	6.5	6.0	2.0	.5	34.5
Robert Covington	2	0	6.0	.000	.000		1.0	1.0	.0	.5	.0
Brandon Boston Jr.	1	0	1.0				.0	.0	.0	.0	.0
Amir Coffey	1	0	1.0				.0	.0	.0	.0	.0
Jason Preston	1	0	1.0				.0	.0	.0	.0	.0

- ^{†} Denotes player spent time with another team in the season. Stats reflect time with the Clippers only.

== Transactions ==
=== Trades ===
February 9, 2023
To Los Angeles Clippers

Mason Plumlee
To Charlotte Hornets

Reggie Jackson
2028 LAC 2nd-round pick
Cash considerations
February 9, 2023
To Los Angeles Clippers

Eric Gordon (from Houston)
2024 conditional second-round pick (from Memphis)
2024 TOR second-round pick (from Memphis)
2027 MEM second-round pick (from Memphis)
To Houston Rockets

John Wall (from Los Angeles)
Danny Green (from Memphis)
2023 right to swap first-round picks (from Los Angeles)
To Memphis Grizzlies

Luke Kennard (from Los Angeles)
2026 right to swap second-round picks (from Los Angeles)
February 9, 2023
To Los Angeles Clippers

Bones Hyland (from Denver)

To Denver Nuggets

Thomas Bryant (from LA Lakers)

To Los Angeles Lakers

Mo Bamba (from Orlando)
Davon Reed (from Denver)
A second-round draft pick (from Denver)
2024 LAC second-round pick (from LA Clippers)
2025 LAC second-round pick (from LA Clippers)

To Orlando Magic

Patrick Beverley (from LA Lakers)
2024 DEN second-round pick (from Denver)
Cash considerations (from LA Lakers)

=== Free agents ===
==== Re-signed ====
Player	Signed	Ref.
Nicolas Batum	July 6, 2022	
Amir Coffey	July 6, 2022	
Xavier Moon	July 9, 2022, Exhibit 10 contract	
Jay Scrubb	July 9, 2022, Exhibit 10 contract	

==== Additions ====
Player	Signed	Former team	Ref.
John Wall	July 8, 2022	Houston Rockets	
Moses Brown	July 9, 2022, Exhibit 10 contract	Cleveland Cavaliers	
Nate Darling	February 17, 2023, Two-way contract	Ontario Clippers	
Keaton Wallace	February 21, 2023, Two-way contract	Ontario Clippers	
Russell Westbrook	February 22, 2023	Utah Jazz	
Xavier Moon	March 1, 2023, Two-way contract	Ontario Clippers	

==== Subtractions ====
Player	Reason left	New team	Ref.
Isaiah Hartenstein	Free Agency	New York Knicks	
Jay Scrubb	Waived	Lakeland Magic	
Xavier Moon	Waived	Ontario Clippers	
Rodney Hood	Free Agency	Memphis Hustle	
Moses Brown	Waived	Westchester Knicks	
Nate Darling	Waived	Ontario Clippers	
Keaton Wallace	Waived	Ontario Clippers	
