= Amir Coffey =

American basketball player (born 1997)

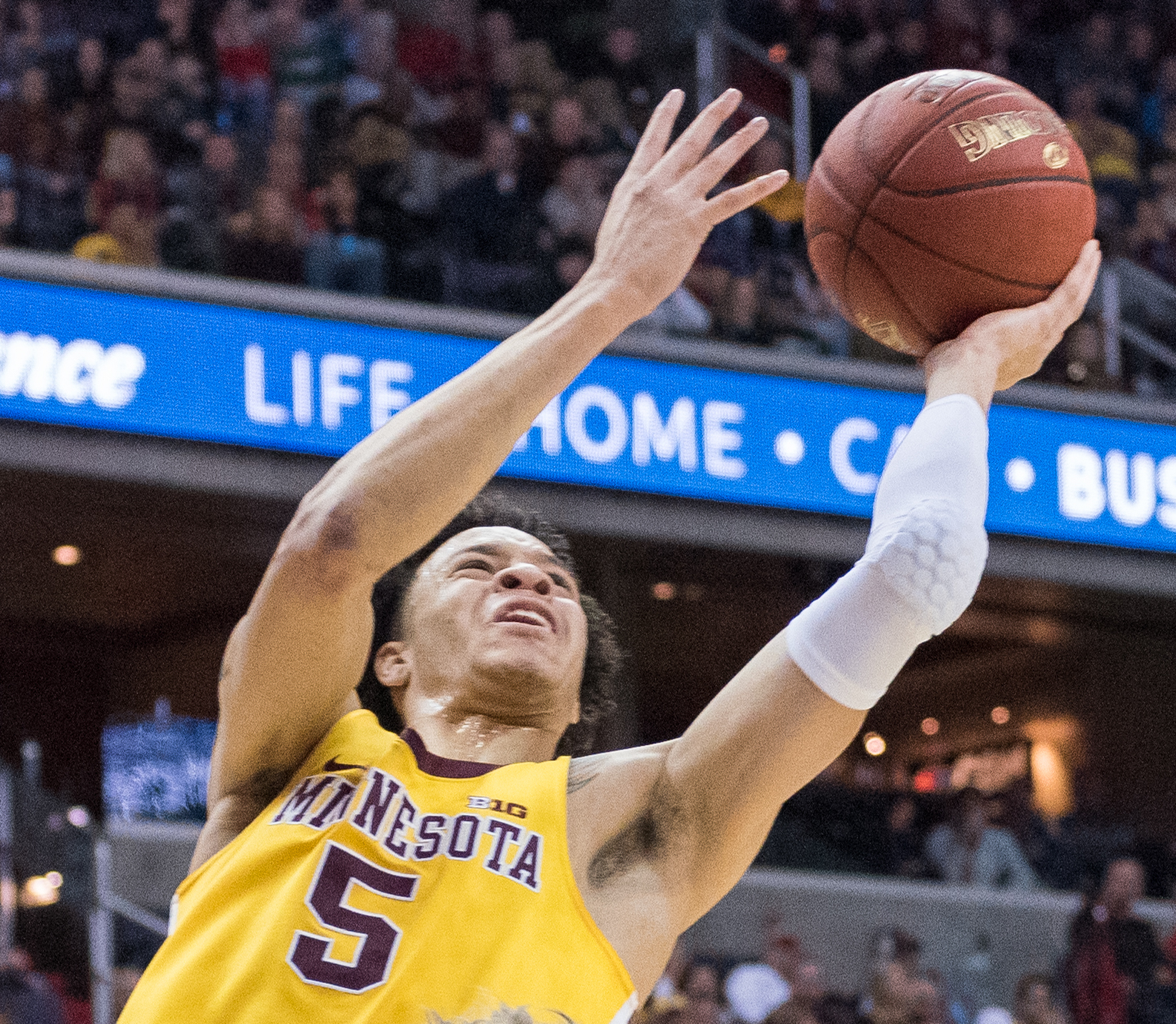
- Coffey with Minnesota in 2017

No. 7 – Hapoel Tel Aviv
- Position: Shooting guard / small forward
- League: Israeli Basketball Premier League; EuroLeague

Personal information
- Born: June 17, 1997 (age 29) Hopkins, Minnesota, U.S.
- Listed height: 2.04 m (6 ft 8 in)
- Listed weight: 95 kg (209 lb)

Career information
- High school: Hopkins (Minnetonka, Minnesota)
- College: Minnesota (2016–2019)
- NBA draft: 2019: undrafted
- Playing career: 2019–present

Career history
- 2019–2025: Los Angeles Clippers
- 2019–2022: →Agua Caliente Clippers
- 2025–2026: Milwaukee Bucks
- 2026: Phoenix Suns
- 2026–present: Hapoel Tel Aviv

Career highlights
- Third-team All-Big Ten (2019); Big Ten All-Freshman Team (2017); Minnesota Mr. Basketball (2016); Associated Press State Player of the Year (2016)
- Stats at NBA.com
- Stats at Basketball Reference

Amir Coffey (/əˈmɪər ˈkɒfi/ ə-MEER KOF-ee; born June 17, 1997) is an American professional basketball player for Hapoel Tel Aviv of the Israeli Basketball Premier League and the EuroLeague.

In high school, Coffey was named 2016 Minnesota Mr. Basketball. He played college basketball for the Minnesota Golden Gophers. He has played in the NBA for the Los Angeles Clippers, Milwaukee Bucks, and Phoenix Suns.

== High school career ==
Attending Hopkins High School in Minnetonka, Minnesota, Coffey received Minnesota Mr. Basketball honors as a senior, while earning Associated Press State Player of the Year and The Minnesota Star Tribune Metro Player of the Year distinction. He averaged 19.9 points during his senior season (2015–16).

A four-star recruit and ranked 32nd overall in ESPN’s top 100 for the class of 2016, Coffey announced his decision to play college basketball at Minnesota in September 2015. He scored seven points to go along with two assists and two rebounds at the 2016 Jordan Brand Classic.

== College career ==
He had an immediate impact on the Minnesota Golden Gophers, playing 33 games and finishing his freshman season as the team’s second-leading scorer (12.2 ppg) and second-leading assist man at 3.1 per game, while averaging 33.2 minutes, 3.8 rebounds, and 1.1 steals per game. Coffey earned Big Ten Conference All-Freshman Team honors.

In his sophomore season, in 18 games Coffey averaged 31.6 minutes, 14.0 points, 4.1 rebounds, and 3.3 assists per game while shooting 47.5% from the field. He missed much of the season due to an injury, a humeral avulsion of the glenohumeral ligament (HAGL) lesion, to his right shoulder.

In his senior season, in 36 games he averaged 35.2 minutes, 16.6 points (6th in the Big Ten), 3.6 rebounds, and 3.2 assists (10th) per game. Coffey was named by coaches and media to the All-Big Ten third team.

== Professional career ==
=== Los Angeles Clippers (2019–2025) ===
After going undrafted in the 2019 NBA draft, Coffey signed a two-way contract with the Los Angeles Clippers. On August 14, 2020, he scored a season-high 21 points, along with four steals, in a 107–103 overtime win over the Oklahoma City Thunder. In 2019-20 in the G League with the Agua Caliente Clippers , he played 15 games and averaged 29.1 minutes, 15.7 points, 2.7 rebounds, 2.7 assists, and 1.1 steals per game, shooting 48.0% from the floor and 40.0% from three point range. Coffey made 18 appearances (including one start) for the Clippers during his rookie campaign, posting averages of 8.8 minutes, 3.2 points, 0.9 rebounds, and 0.8 assists per game.

On February 15, 2021, Coffey scored a season-high 15 points in a 125–118 win over the Miami Heat. In 2020-21 in the G League with the Agua Caliente Clippers , he played 7 games and averaged 32.1 minutes, 18.4 points, 4.1rebounds, 4.4 assists, and 0.9 steals per game. He made 44 total appearances for Los Angeles in the 2020–21 NBA season, averaging 9.0 minutes, 3.2 points, 1.0 rebounds, and 0.5 assists per game, while shooting 41.1% from three-point range.

On September 27, 2021, Coffey signed another two-way contract with the Clippers. On March 26, 2022, his deal was converted into a standard contract. On April 1, Coffey logged a career-high 32 points, alongside seven assists and four steals, in a 153–119 blowout win over the Milwaukee Bucks. On April 10, Coffey raised his career-high to 35 points in a 138–88 win against the Thunder. In 2021-22 in the G League with the Agua Caliente Clippers , he played 5 games and averaged 32.9 minutes, 19.6 points, 5.8rebounds, 2.8 assists, and 1.2 steals per game. Coffey made 69 appearances (including 30 starts) for the Clippers during the 2021–22 NBA season, logging averages of 22.7 minutes, 9.0 points, 2.9 rebounds, and 1.8 assists per game, while shooting 45.3% from the field and 86.3% from the free throw line.

On July 6, 2022, Coffey re-signed with the Clippers on a three-year, $11 million contract. He played in 50 contests (starting nine) for the Clippers in the 2022–23 season, averaging 12.5 minutes, 3.4 points, 1.1 rebounds, and 1.1 assists per game.

Coffey made 70 appearances (including 13 starts) for Los Angeles during the 2023–24 season, recording averages of 20.9 minutes, 6.6 points, 2.1 rebounds, and 1.1 assists per game, while shooting 47.2% from the field, and 85.9% from the free throw line.

Coffey made 72 appearances (starting another 13 games) for the Clippers during the 2024–25 season, compiling averages of 24.3 minutes, 9.7 points, 2.2 rebounds, and 1.1 assists per game, while shooting 47.1% from the floor, 40.9% from three point range, and 89.1% from the free throw line, .

=== Milwaukee Bucks (2025–2026) ===
On August 20, 2025, Coffey signed with the Milwaukee Bucks. Coffey made 30 appearances (including two starts) for Milwaukee in the 2025–26 season, averaging 8.8 minutes, 2.4 points, 0.9 rebounds, and 0.4 assists per game, while shooting 47.3% from the field and 13-for-15 from the free throw line.

=== Phoenix Suns (2026) ===
On February 5, 2026, Coffey was traded to the Phoenix Suns in a three-team trade involving the Chicago Bulls. Coffey played in 16 contests (including one start) for Phoenix, averaging 14.1 minutes, 4.8 points, 1.9 rebounds, and 1.0 assists per game, while shooting 50.0% from the field..

=== Hapoel Tel Aviv (2026–present) ===
On July 9, 2026, Coffey signed with Hapoel Tel Aviv of the Israeli Basketball Premier League and the EuroLeague.

== Career statistics ==
Legend
GP	Games played	GS	Games started	MPG	Minutes per game
FG%	Field goal percentage	3P%	3-point field goal percentage	FT%	Free throw percentage
RPG	Rebounds per game	APG	Assists per game	SPG	Steals per game
BPG	Blocks per game	PPG	Points per game	**Bold**	Career high

=== NBA ===
==== Regular season ====
Year	Team	GP	GS	MPG	FG%	3P%	FT%	RPG	APG	SPG	BPG	PPG
2019–20	L.A. Clippers	18	1	8.8	.426	.316	.545	.9	.8	.3	.1	3.2
2020–21	L.A. Clippers	44	1	9.0	.437	.411	.711	1.0	.5	.2	.0	3.2
2021–22	L.A. Clippers	69	**30**	22.7	.453	.378	.863	**2.9**	**1.8**	**.6**	**.2**	9.0
2022–23	L.A. Clippers	50	9	12.5	.386	.275	.778	1.1	1.1	.1	.1	3.4
2023–24	L.A. Clippers	70	13	20.9	.472	.380	.859	2.1	1.1	**.6**	**.2**	6.6
2024–25	L.A. Clippers	**72**	13	**24.3**	.471	.409	**.891**	2.2	1.1	**.6**	.1	**9.7**
2025–26	Milwaukee	30	2	8.8	.473	.280	.867	.9	.4	.1	.1	2.4
2025–26	Phoenix	16	1	14.1	**.500**	**.417**	.692	1.9	1.0	.4	.1	4.8
Career		369	70	17.5	.457	.382	.834	1.8	1.1	.4	.1	6.2

==== Playoffs ====
Year	Team	GP	GS	MPG	FG%	3P%	FT%	RPG	APG	SPG	BPG	PPG
2020	L.A. Clippers	3	0	2.3	.000	.000	**1.000**	.0	**1.3**	**.3**	.0	.7
2021	L.A. Clippers	**10**	0	1.6	**.750**	**1.000**	.000	.2	.1	.1	.0	.7
2023	L.A. Clippers	1	0	1.0	—	—	—	.0	.0	.0	.0	.0
2024	L.A. Clippers	6	**3**	**18.7**	.318	.273	—	**1.7**	.3	**.3**	**.2**	**2.8**
2026	Phoenix	4	0	1.5	—	—	—	.0	.0	.0	.0	.0
Career		24	3	5.9	.345	.308	.667	.5	.3	.2	.0	1.1

=== College ===
Year	Team	GP	GS	MPG	FG%	3P%	FT%	RPG	APG	SPG	BPG	PPG
2016–17	Minnesota	33	33	33.2	.449	.337	**.753**	3.8	3.1	**1.1**	.2	12.2
2017–18	Minnesota	18	18	31.6	**.475**	**.368**	.687	**4.1**	**3.3**	.7	**.3**	14.0
2018–19	Minnesota	**36**	**36**	**35.2**	.436	.304	.740	3.6	3.2	.9	.2	**16.6**
Career		87	87	33.7	.448	.328	.734	3.8	3.2	.9	.2	14.4

== Personal life ==
His father Richard Coffey played college basketball at Minnesota, followed by a professional career in the NBA (52 games for the Minnesota Timberwolves in 1990–91), the CBA, Turkey, and Spain.

His older sister, Nia Coffey, played basketball at Northwestern University. She went fifth overall in the 2017 WNBA draft to the San Antonio Stars, and plays in the WNBA.

== See also ==
- List of second-generation NBA players
