= 2022–23 Golden State Warriors season =

- Head coach: Steve Kerr
- General manager: Bob Myers
- Owners: Joe Lacob; Peter Guber
- Arena: Chase Center

Results
- Record: 44–38 (.537)
- Place: Division: 4th (Pacific); Conference: 6th (Western)
- Playoff finish: Conference semifinals (lost to Lakers 2–4)
- Stats at Basketball Reference

Local media
- Television: NBC Sports Bay Area
- Radio: 95.7 The Game

The 2022–23 Golden State Warriors season was the 77th season of the franchise in the National Basketball Association (NBA), their 61st in the San Francisco Bay Area, their fourth season at the Chase Center, 9th season with Steve Kerr as a head coach and their 12th and final season with Bob Myers as a general manager. The Warriors entered the season as defending champions after winning the 2022 NBA Finals against the Boston Celtics during the previous season for their fourth championship in eight years and seventh overall.

During a team practice on October 5, 2022, teammates Jordan Poole and Draymond Green got into an altercation, resulting in Green striking Poole with a punch. TMZ published a leaked video on October 7, showing the punch but not what led to the incident. On October 9, Green publicly apologized for the incident and announced that he would spend a few days away from the team. On October 12, the team fined Green for the altercation as opposed to the suspected suspension.

With this drama lingering over the team, the Warriors struggled for much of the season, having one of the worst records on the road while also having one of the best at home. They finished with a winning record for the tenth time in the previous eleven seasons, and clinched the sixth seed in the playoffs. In the first round of the playoffs, they eliminated the third-seeded Sacramento Kings in seven games. However, they then lost to the seventh-seeded Los Angeles Lakers in six games in the conference semifinals, losing the conference semifinals for the first time since the 2013 NBA playoffs to the San Antonio Spurs. This team also lost in the playoffs before the Finals for the first time since 2014, and marking their first playoff series loss against a Western Conference opponent under head coach Steve Kerr.

== Draft ==
Round	Pick	Player	Position	Nationality	School / club team
1	28	Patrick Baldwin Jr.	Power forward	United States	Milwaukee (Fr.)
2	51	Tyrese Martin	Shooting guard	United States	UConn (Sr.)
2	55	Gui Santos	Small forward	Brazil	Minas (Brazil)

The Warriors will enter the draft holding one first round picks and two second round picks. On draft night they traded the 51st pick (Tyrese Martin) and cash considerations ($2,000,000) to the Atlanta Hawks in exchange for the 44th pick (Ryan Rollins).

== Standings ==
=== Division ===
Pacific Division	W	L	PCT	GB	Home	Road	Div	GP
y – Sacramento Kings	48	34	.585	–	23‍–‍18	25‍–‍16	9–7	82
x – Phoenix Suns	45	37	.549	3.0	28‍–‍13	17‍–‍24	9–7	82
x – Los Angeles Clippers	44	38	.537	4.0	23‍–‍18	21‍–‍20	9–7	82
x – Golden State Warriors	44	38	.537	4.0	33‍–‍8	11‍–‍30	7–9	82
x – Los Angeles Lakers	43	39	.524	5.0	23‍–‍18	20‍–‍21	6–10	82

=== Conference ===
Western Conference
#	Team	W	L	PCT	GB	GP
1	c – Denver Nuggets *	53	29	.646	–	82
2	y – Memphis Grizzlies *	51	31	.622	2.0	82
3	y – Sacramento Kings *	48	34	.585	5.0	82
4	x – Phoenix Suns	45	37	.549	8.0	82
5	x – Los Angeles Clippers	44	38	.537	9.0	82
6	x – Golden State Warriors	44	38	.537	9.0	82
7	x – Los Angeles Lakers	43	39	.524	10.0	82
8	x – Minnesota Timberwolves	42	40	.512	11.0	82
9	pi – New Orleans Pelicans	42	40	.512	11.0	82
10	pi – Oklahoma City Thunder	40	42	.488	13.0	82
11	Dallas Mavericks	38	44	.463	15.0	82
12	Utah Jazz	37	45	.451	16.0	82
13	Portland Trail Blazers	33	49	.402	20.0	82
14	Houston Rockets	22	60	.268	31.0	82
15	San Antonio Spurs	22	60	.268	31.0	82

== Roster ==
2022–23 Golden State Warriors roster
Players

Pos.	No.	Player	Height	Weight	DOB	From
F	7	Patrick Baldwin Jr. (injured)	6 ft 9 in (2.06 m)	215 lb (98 kg)	2002-11-18	Milwaukee
G	30	Stephen Curry	6 ft 2 in (1.88 m)	185 lb (84 kg)	1988-03-14	Davidson
G	0	Donte DiVincenzo	6 ft 4 in (1.93 m)	203 lb (92 kg)	1997-01-31	Villanova
F	23	Draymond Green	6 ft 6 in (1.98 m)	230 lb (104 kg)	1990-03-04	Michigan State
F/C	1	JaMychal Green	6 ft 9 in (2.06 m)	227 lb (103 kg)	1990-06-21	Alabama
F	9	Andre Iguodala (injured)	6 ft 6 in (1.98 m)	215 lb (98 kg)	1984-01-28	Arizona
G	10	Ty Jerome (TW)	6 ft 5 in (1.96 m)	195 lb (88 kg)	1997-07-08	Virginia
F	00	Jonathan Kuminga	6 ft 7 in (2.01 m)	225 lb (102 kg)	2002-10-06	The Patrick School (NJ)
F	40	Anthony Lamb	6 ft 6 in (1.98 m)	227 lb (103 kg)	1998-01-20	Vermont
F	5	Kevon Looney	6 ft 9 in (2.06 m)	222 lb (101 kg)	1996-02-06	UCLA
G	4	Moses Moody	6 ft 5 in (1.96 m)	211 lb (96 kg)	2002-05-31	Arkansas
G	8	Gary Payton II	6 ft 2 in (1.88 m)	195 lb (88 kg)	1992-12-01	Oregon State
G	3	Jordan Poole	6 ft 4 in (1.93 m)	194 lb (88 kg)	1999-06-19	Michigan
G	25	Lester Quiñones (TW)	6 ft 4 in (1.93 m)	208 lb (94 kg)	2000-11-16	Memphis
G	2	Ryan Rollins (injured)	6 ft 4 in (1.93 m)	180 lb (82 kg)	2002-07-03	Toledo
G/F	11	Klay Thompson	6 ft 6 in (1.98 m)	220 lb (100 kg)	1990-02-08	Washington State
F	22	Andrew Wiggins	6 ft 7 in (2.01 m)	197 lb (89 kg)	1995-02-23	Kansas

Coaches
Head coach
- Steve Kerr
Assistant(s)
- Ron Adams
- Kenny Atkinson
- Chris DeMarco
- Bruce Fraser
- Jama Mahlalela
- Dejan Milojević

Legend
- (DP) Unsigned draft pick
- (FA) Free agent
- (S) Suspended
- (GL) On assignment to G League affiliate
- (TW) Two-way affiliate player
- Injured

Roster
Updated: April 18, 2023

== Game log ==
All played matches and all upcoming games for current season are listed below. For more info about the games and where to watch the game on TV, there are several online services and apps to help you with that.

=== Preseason ===
2022 preseason game log
Total: 3–2 (home: 2–2; road: 1–0)
Preseason: 3–2 (home: 2–2; road: 1–0)

Game	Date	Team	Score	High points	High rebounds	High assists	Location Attendance	Record
1	September 30	@ Washington	W 96–87	James Wiseman (20)	James Wiseman (9)	Jonathan Kuminga (3)	Saitama Super Arena; 20,497	1–0
2	October 1	Washington	W 104–95	Stephen Curry (17)	Kevon Looney (7)	Draymond Green (5)	Saitama Super Arena; 20,647	2–0
3	October 9	L.A. Lakers	L 121–124	Jordan Poole (25)	Jonathan Kuminga (8)	Jordan Poole (6)	Chase Center; 18,064	2–1
4	October 11	Portland	W 131–98	JaMychal Green (20)	JaMychal Green (8)	Donte DiVincenzo (10)	Chase Center; 18,064	3–1
5	October 14	Denver	L 112–119	Thompson, Kuminga (17)	Kuminga, Wiseman (6)	Jonathan Kuminga (7)	Chase Center; N/A (Note: Spectators were in attendance, but the exact number was not reported.)	3–2

2022–23 season schedule

=== Regular season ===
2022–23 game log
Total: 44–38 (home: 33–8; road: 11–30)
October: 3–4 (home: 3–1; road: 0–3)

Game	Date	Team	Score	High points	High rebounds	High assists	Location Attendance	Record
1	October 18	L.A. Lakers	W 123–109	Stephen Curry (33)	Wiseman, J. Green (7)	Curry, Poole (7)	Chase Center; 18,064	1–0
2	October 21	Denver	L 123–128	Stephen Curry (34)	Andrew Wiggins (8)	Draymond Green (9)	Chase Center; 18,064	1–1
3	October 23	Sacramento	W 130–125	Stephen Curry (33)	Kevon Looney (8)	Kevon Looney (6)	Chase Center; 18,064	2–1
4	October 25	@ Phoenix	L 105–134	Stephen Curry (21)	Draymond Green (8)	Stephen Curry (8)	Footprint Center; 18,055	2–2
5	October 27	Miami	W 123–110	Stephen Curry (33)	Andrew Wiggins (10)	Stephen Curry (9)	Chase Center; 18,064	3–2
6	October 29	@ Charlotte	L 113–120 (OT)	Stephen Curry (31)	Stephen Curry (11)	D. Green, Curry (6)	Spectrum Center; 19,079	3–3
7	October 30	@ Detroit	L 114–128	Stephen Curry (32)	Kevon Looney (9)	Draymond Green (7)	Little Caesars Arena; 20,190	3–4

November : 8–7 (home: 6–0; road: 2–7)

Game	Date	Team	Score	High points	High rebounds	High assists	Location Attendance	Record
8	November 1	@ Miami	L 109–116	Stephen Curry (23)	Stephen Curry (13)	Stephen Curry (13)	FTX Arena; 19,600	3–5
9	November 3	@ Orlando	L 129–130	Stephen Curry (39)	Kevon Looney (7)	Stephen Curry (9)	Amway Center; 18,846	3–6
10	November 4	@ New Orleans	L 105–114	Jordan Poole (20)	Jerome, Wiseman (6)	Jordan Poole (9)	Smoothie King Center; 18,451	3–7
11	November 7	Sacramento	W 116–113	Stephen Curry (47)	Kevon Looney (13)	Stephen Curry (8)	Chase Center; 18,064	4–7
12	November 11	Cleveland	W 106–101	Stephen Curry (40)	D. Green, Looney (9)	Draymond Green (13)	Chase Center; 18,064	5–7
13	November 13	@ Sacramento	L 115–122	Stephen Curry (27)	Kevon Looney (10)	Draymond Green (11)	Golden 1 Center; 16,410	5–8
14	November 14	San Antonio	W 132–95	Jordan Poole (36)	Draymond Green (7)	Draymond Green (6)	Chase Center; 18,064	6–8
15	November 16	@ Phoenix	L 119–130	Stephen Curry (50)	Stephen Curry (9)	Green, Poole (8)	Footprint Center; 17,071	6–9
16	November 18	New York	W 111–101	Stephen Curry (24)	Draymond Green (9)	Stephen Curry (10)	Chase Center; 18,064	7–9
17	November 20	@ Houston	W 127–120	Klay Thompson (41)	Kevon Looney (7)	Stephen Curry (15)	Toyota Center; 18,055	8–9
18	November 21	@ New Orleans	L 83–128	Jordan Poole (26)	JaMychal Green (8)	DiVincenzo, Lamb (5)	Smoothie King Center; 18,589	8–10
19	November 23	L.A. Clippers	W 124–107	Andrew Wiggins (31)	D. Green, Lamb (7)	Draymond Green (12)	Chase Center; 18,064	9–10
20	November 25	Utah	W 129–118	Stephen Curry (33)	Kevon Looney (12)	Jordan Poole (6)	Chase Center; 18,064	10–10
21	November 27	@ Minnesota	W 137–114	Stephen Curry (25)	Stephen Curry (11)	Draymond Green (11)	Target Center; 17,136	11–10
22	November 29	@ Dallas	L 113–116	Stephen Curry (32)	Jonathan Kuminga (10)	Jordan Poole (9)	American Airlines Center; 20,277	11–11

December: 8–7 (home: 7–1; road: 1–6)

Game	Date	Team	Score	High points	High rebounds	High assists	Location Attendance	Record
23	December 2	Chicago	W 119–111	Jordan Poole (30)	Kevon Looney (12)	Draymond Green (10)	Chase Center; 18,064	12–11
24	December 3	Houston	W 120–101	Andrew Wiggins (36)	Kevon Looney (12)	Stephen Curry (10)	Chase Center; 18,064	13–11
25	December 5	Indiana	L 104–112	Klay Thompson (28)	Draymond Green (9)	Stephen Curry (6)	Chase Center; 18,064	13–12
26	December 7	@ Utah	L 123–124	Jordan Poole (36)	DiVincenzo, Looney (9)	Jordan Poole (8)	Vivint Arena; 18,206	13–13
27	December 10	Boston	W 123–107	Klay Thompson (34)	Kevon Looney (15)	Stephen Curry (7)	Chase Center; 18,064	14–13
28	December 13	@ Milwaukee	L 111–128	Stephen Curry (20)	Kevon Looney (8)	Draymond Green (7)	Fiserv Forum; 17,628	14–14
29	December 14	@ Indiana	L 119–125	Stephen Curry (38)	DiVincenzo, Kuminga (8)	Stephen Curry (7)	Gainbridge Fieldhouse; 15,069	14–15
30	December 16	@ Philadelphia	L 106–118	Jordan Poole (29)	Kevon Looney (11)	Kevon Looney (9)	Wells Fargo Center; 20,567	14–16
31	December 18	@ Toronto	W 126–110	Jordan Poole (43)	Kevon Looney (11)	Poole, DiVincenzo (6)	Scotiabank Arena; 19,800	15–16
32	December 20	@ New York	L 94–132	Jordan Poole (26)	Kevon Looney (6)	Draymond Green (6)	Madison Square Garden; 19,812	15–17
33	December 21	@ Brooklyn	L 113–143	James Wiseman (30)	Kevon Looney (7)	Ty Jerome (7)	Barclays Center; 18,026	15–18
34	December 25	Memphis	W 123–109	Jordan Poole (32)	Draymond Green (13)	Draymond Green (13)	Chase Center; 18,064	16–18
35	December 27	Charlotte	W 110–105	Jordan Poole (29)	Draymond Green (10)	Donte DiVincenzo (7)	Chase Center; 18,064	17–18
36	December 28	Utah	W 112–107	Jordan Poole (26)	Kevon Looney (12)	D. Green, Looney (5)	Chase Center; 18,064	18–18
37	December 30	Portland	W 118–112	Jordan Poole (41)	D. Green, Looney (11)	Kuminga, Poole (6)	Chase Center; 18,064	19–18

January: 7–6 (home: 3–4; road: 4–2)

Game	Date	Team	Score	High points	High rebounds	High assists	Location Attendance	Record
38	January 2	Atlanta	W 143–141 (2OT)	Klay Thompson (54)	Kevon Looney (20)	Draymond Green (11)	Chase Center; 18,064	20–18
39	January 4	Detroit	L 119–122	Klay Thompson (30)	Kevon Looney (15)	Draymond Green (7)	Chase Center; 18,064	20–19
40	January 7	Orlando	L 101–115	Anthony Lamb (26)	Kevon Looney (12)	D. Green, Poole (6)	Chase Center; 18,061	20–20
41	January 10	Phoenix	L 113–125	Klay Thompson (29)	Draymond Green (12)	D. Green, Poole (6)	Chase Center; 18,064	20–21
42	January 13	@ San Antonio	W 144–113	Jordan Poole (25)	Draymond Green (12)	Jordan Poole (6)	Alamodome; 68,323	21–21
43	January 15	@ Chicago	L 118–132	Klay Thompson (26)	Stephen Curry (10)	Draymond Green (7)	United Center; 20,139	21–22
44	January 16	@ Washington	W 127–118	Stephen Curry (41)	Kevon Looney (9)	Draymond Green (7)	Capital One Arena; 20,476	22–22
45	January 19	@ Boston	L 118–121 (OT)	Stephen Curry (29)	Draymond Green (13)	Draymond Green (9)	TD Garden; 19,156	22–23
46	January 20	@ Cleveland	W 120–114	Jordan Poole (32)	Kevon Looney (17)	Ty Jerome (8)	Rocket Mortgage FieldHouse; 19,432	23–23
47	January 22	Brooklyn	L 116–120	Stephen Curry (26)	Draymond Green (11)	Curry, D. Green (6)	Chase Center; 18,064	23–24
48	January 25	Memphis	W 122–120	Stephen Curry (34)	Draymond Green (13)	D. Green, Poole (7)	Chase Center; 18,064	24–24
49	January 27	Toronto	W 129–117	Stephen Curry (35)	Looney, Thompson (8)	Stephen Curry (11)	Chase Center; 18,064	25–24
50	January 30	@ Oklahoma City	W 128–120	Stephen Curry (38)	Draymond Green (9)	Curry, D. Green (12)	Paycom Center; 16,854	26–24

February : 6–6 (home: 6–1; road: 0–5)

Game	Date	Team	Score	High points	High rebounds	High assists	Location Attendance	Record
51	February 1	@ Minnesota	L 114–119	Stephen Curry (29)	Draymond Green (12)	DiVincenzo, Poole (5)	Target Center; 17,136	26–25
52	February 2	@ Denver	L 117–134	Stephen Curry (28)	Andrew Wiggins (10)	Curry, Poole (5)	Ball Arena; 19,555	26–26
53	February 4	Dallas	W 119–113	Stephen Curry (21)	Draymond Green (9)	Draymond Green (9)	Chase Center; 18,064	27–26
54	February 6	Oklahoma City	W 141–114	Klay Thompson (42)	Kevon Looney (11)	Jordan Poole (12)	Chase Center; 18,064	28–26
55	February 8	@ Portland	L 122–125	Jordan Poole (38)	Andrew Wiggins (10)	D. Green, Poole (7)	Moda Center; 18,450	28–27
56	February 11	L.A. Lakers	L 103–109	Jordan Poole (29)	Kevon Looney (13)	Draymond Green (10)	Chase Center; 18,064	28–28
57	February 13	Washington	W 135–126	Andrew Wiggins (29)	Kevon Looney (13)	Ty Jerome (7)	Chase Center; 18,064	29–28
58	February 14	@ L.A. Clippers	L 124–134	Jordan Poole (28)	Kevon Looney (14)	Draymond Green (7)	Crypto.com Arena; 16,741	29–29
59	February 23	@ L.A. Lakers	L 111–124	Klay Thompson (22)	Kevon Looney (15)	D. Green, Kuminga (5)	Crypto.com Arena; 18,997	29–30
60	February 24	Houston	W 116–101	Klay Thompson (42)	Kevon Looney (13)	Jordan Poole (8)	Chase Center; 18,064	30–30
61	February 26	Minnesota	W 109–104	Klay Thompson (32)	Kevon Looney (17)	Donte DiVincenzo (5)	Chase Center; 18,064	31–30
62	February 28	Portland	W 123–105	Jordan Poole (29)	Draymond Green (9)	Draymond Green (8)	Chase Center; 18,064	32–30

March : 9–7 (home: 7–1; road: 2–6)

Game	Date	Team	Score	High points	High rebounds	High assists	Location Attendance	Record
63	March 2	L.A. Clippers	W 115–91	Jordan Poole (34)	DiVincenzo, Thompson (11)	Draymond Green (9)	Chase Center; 18,064	33–30
64	March 3	New Orleans	W 108–99	Klay Thompson (27)	Kevon Looney (11)	Jordan Poole (7)	Chase Center; 18,064	34–30
65	March 5	@ L.A. Lakers	L 105–113	Stephen Curry (27)	Draymond Green (8)	Curry, DiVincenzo (6)	Crypto.com Arena; 18,997	34–31
66	March 7	@ Oklahoma City	L 128–137	Stephen Curry (40)	Curry, DiVincenzo (6)	Draymond Green (11)	Paycom Center; 16,142	34–32
67	March 9	@ Memphis	L 110–131	Stephen Curry (29)	Curry, Looney (7)	Draymond Green (7)	FedExForum; 17,794	34–33
68	March 11	Milwaukee	W 125–116 (OT)	Stephen Curry (36)	Kevon Looney (15)	Draymond Green (9)	Chase Center; 18,064	35–33
69	March 13	Phoenix	W 123–112	Klay Thompson (38)	Kevon Looney (10)	Jordan Poole (6)	Chase Center; 18,064	36–33
70	March 15	@ L.A. Clippers	L 126–134	Stephen Curry (50)	Kevon Looney (13)	Stephen Curry (6)	Crypto.com Arena; 19,068	36–34
71	March 17	@ Atlanta	L 119–127	Stephen Curry (31)	Kevon Looney (16)	Donte DiVincenzo (6)	State Farm Arena; 18,201	36–35
72	March 18	@ Memphis	L 119–133	Jonathan Kuminga (24)	Curry, Kuminga (8)	Donte DiVincenzo (7)	FedExForum; 18,396	36–36
73	March 20	@ Houston	W 121–108	Stephen Curry (30)	Kevon Looney (10)	Jordan Poole (8)	Toyota Center; 16,116	37–36
74	March 22	@ Dallas	W 127–125	Jonathan Kuminga (22)	Kevon Looney (12)	Stephen Curry (13)	American Airlines Center; 20,377	38–36
75	March 24	Philadelphia	W 120–112	Jordan Poole (33)	Kevon Looney (10)	Draymond Green (10)	Chase Center; 18,064	39–36
76	March 26	Minnesota	L 96–99	Jordan Poole (27)	Green, Looney (7)	Stephen Curry (9)	Chase Center; 18,064	39–37
77	March 28	New Orleans	W 120–109	Stephen Curry (39)	Curry, Looney (8)	Draymond Green (13)	Chase Center; 18,064	40–37
78	March 31	San Antonio	W 130–115	Stephen Curry (33)	Kevon Looney (9)	Draymond Green (11)	Chase Center; 18,064	41–37

April : 3–1 (home: 1–0; road: 2–1)

Game	Date	Team	Score	High points	High rebounds	High assists	Location Attendance	Record
79	April 2	@ Denver	L 110–112	Klay Thompson (25)	Kevon Looney (14)	Draymond Green (7)	Ball Arena; 19,752	41–38
80	April 4	Oklahoma City	W 136–125	Stephen Curry (34)	Kevon Looney (11)	Stephen Curry (6)	Chase Center; 18,064	42–38
81	April 7	@ Sacramento	W 119–97	Klay Thompson (29)	Kevon Looney (16)	Donte DiVincenzo (9)	Golden 1 Center; 18,253	43–38
82	April 9	@ Portland	W 157–101	Stephen Curry (26)	Looney, Payton II (8)	Donte DiVincenzo (8)	Moda Center; 19,731	44–38

2022–23 season schedule

== Playoffs ==
2023 playoff game log
Total: 6–7 (home: 4–2; road: 2–5)
First Round: 4–3 (home: 2–1; road: 2–2)

Game	Date	Team	Score	High points	High rebounds	High assists	Location Attendance	Series
1	April 15	@ Sacramento	L 123–126	Stephen Curry (30)	D. Green, Looney (9)	Draymond Green (11)	Golden 1 Center; 18,253	0–1
2	April 17	@ Sacramento	L 106–114	Stephen Curry (28)	Kevon Looney (7)	Stephen Curry (6)	Golden 1 Center; 18,253	0–2
3	April 20	Sacramento	W 114–97	Stephen Curry (36)	Kevon Looney (20)	Kevon Looney (9)	Chase Center; 18,064	1–2
4	April 23	Sacramento	W 126–125	Stephen Curry (34)	Kevon Looney (14)	Draymond Green (7)	Chase Center; 18,064	2–2
5	April 26	@ Sacramento	W 123–116	Stephen Curry (31)	Kevon Looney (22)	Stephen Curry (8)	Golden 1 Center; 18,253	3–2
6	April 28	Sacramento	L 99–118	Stephen Curry (29)	Kevon Looney (13)	Draymond Green (10)	Chase Center; 18,064	3–3
7	April 30	@ Sacramento	W 120–100	Stephen Curry (50)	Kevon Looney (21)	Draymond Green (8)	Golden 1 Center; 18,253	4–3

Conference Semifinals: 2–4 (home: 2–1; road: 0–3)

Game	Date	Team	Score	High points	High rebounds	High assists	Location Attendance	Series
1	May 2	L.A. Lakers	L 112–117	Stephen Curry (27)	Kevon Looney (23)	Draymond Green (7)	Chase Center; 18,064	0–1
2	May 4	L.A. Lakers	W 127–100	Klay Thompson (30)	Draymond Green (11)	Stephen Curry (12)	Chase Center; 18,064	1–1
3	May 6	@ L.A. Lakers	L 97–127	Stephen Curry (23)	Andrew Wiggins (9)	Jordan Poole (6)	Crypto.com Arena; 18,997	1–2
4	May 8	@ L.A. Lakers	L 101–104	Stephen Curry (31)	Curry, D. Green (10)	Stephen Curry (14)	Crypto.com Arena; 18,997	1–3
5	May 10	L.A. Lakers	W 121–106	Stephen Curry (27)	Draymond Green (10)	Stephen Curry (8)	Chase Center; 18,064	2–3
6	May 12	@ L.A. Lakers	L 101–122	Stephen Curry (32)	Kevon Looney (18)	Curry, Thompson (5)	Crypto.com Arena; 18,997	2–4

2023 playoff schedule

== Transactions ==
=== Trades ===
June 23, 2022	To Golden State Warriors • Draft rights to (United States) Ryan Rollins (No. 44)	To Atlanta Hawks • Draft rights to (United States) Tyrese Martin (No. 51) • Cash considerations
February 9, 2023	Four-team trade
February 9, 2023	To Golden State Warriors • (United States) Gary Payton II • 2 future ATL second-round picks	To Portland Trail Blazers • (United States) Kevin Knox II • 5 future second-round picks
February 9, 2023	To Detroit Pistons • (United States) James Wiseman	To Atlanta Hawks • (United States) Saddiq Bey

=== Free agency ===
==== Re-signed ====
Date	Player	Ref.
July 10, 2022	(United States) Kevon Looney	
September 26, 2022	(United States) Andre Iguodala	
October 16, 2022	(United States) Jordan Poole	
October 16, 2022	(Canada) Andrew Wiggins	

==== Additions ====
Date	Player	Former team	Ref.
July 8, 2022	(United States) Donte DiVincenzo	Sacramento Kings	
August 1, 2022	(United States) JaMychal Green	Denver Nuggets	
October 14, 2022	(United States) Ty Jerome	Oklahoma City Thunder	
October 14, 2022	(United States) Anthony Lamb	San Antonio Spurs	

==== Subtractions ====
Date	Player	Reason	New team	Ref.
July 1, 2022	(Mexico) Juan Toscano-Anderson	Free agency	Los Angeles Lakers	
July 5, 2022	(United States) Damion Lee	Free agency	Phoenix Suns	
July 6, 2022	(United States) Otto Porter Jr.	Free agency	Toronto Raptors	
February 9, 2023	(United States) James Wiseman	Trade	Detroit Pistons	
August 9, 2022	(Serbia) Nemanja Bjelica	Free agency	Fenerbahçe (Turkey)	
October 13, 2022	(United States) Quinndary Weatherspoon	Waived	Tianjin Pioneers (China)	
October 24, 2022	(United States) Chris Chiozza	Free agency	Long Island Nets (NBA G League)	
