= Terence Davis =

American basketball player (born 1997)

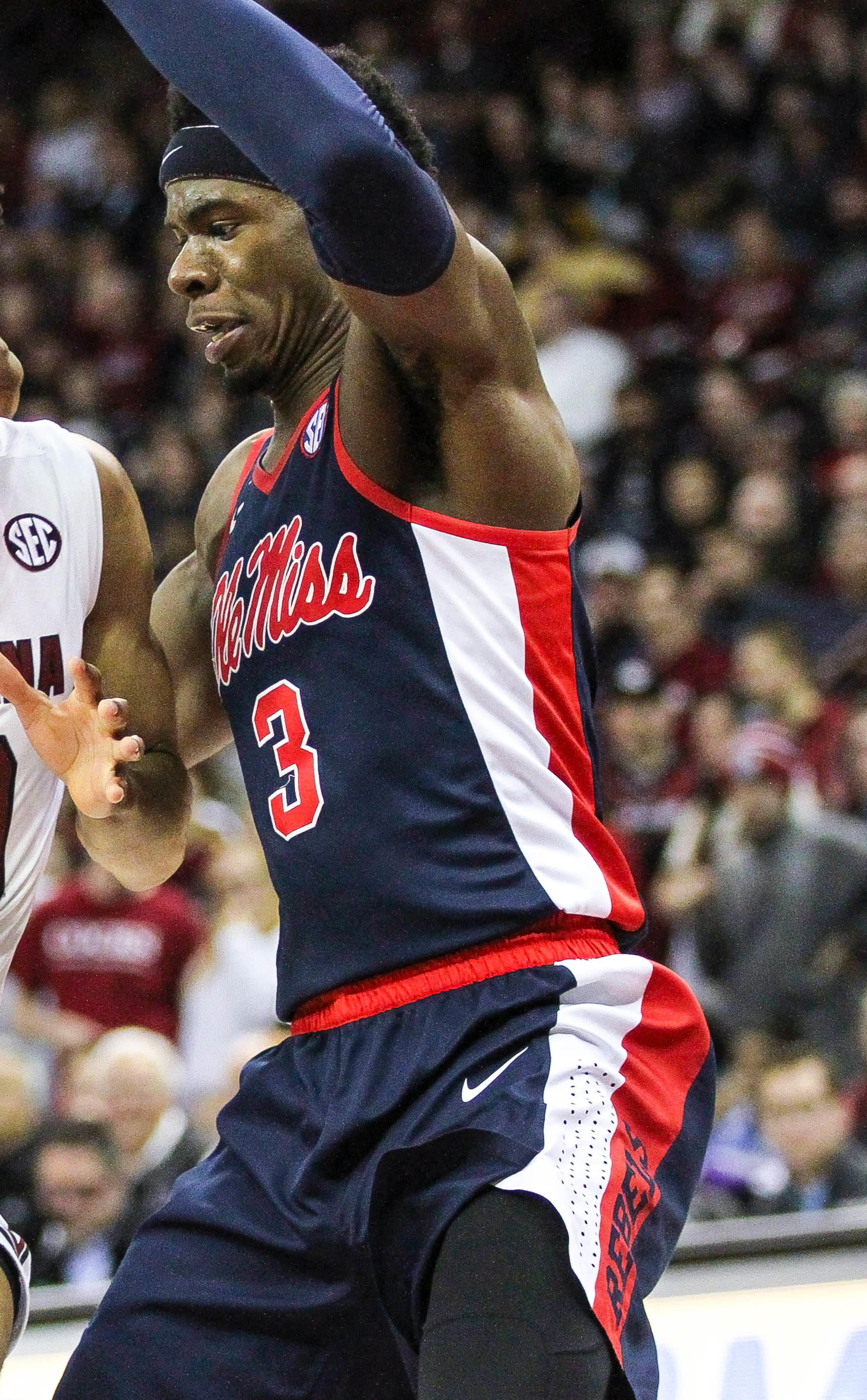
- Davis with Ole Miss in 2019

Free agent
- Position: Point guard / shooting guard

Personal information
- Born: May 16, 1997 (age 29) Southaven, Mississippi, U.S.
- Listed height: 6 ft 4 in (1.93 m)
- Listed weight: 200 lb (91 kg)

Career information
- High school: Southaven (Southaven, Mississippi)
- College: Ole Miss (2015–2019)
- NBA draft: 2019: undrafted
- Playing career: 2019–present

Career history
- 2019–2021: Toronto Raptors
- 2021–2023: Sacramento Kings
- 2023–2024: Rip City Remix
- 2024–2025: Wisconsin Herd
- 2025: Sacramento Kings
- 2026: Leones de Ponce

Career highlights
- NBA All-Rookie Second Team (2020); Second-team All-SEC (2019)
- Stats at NBA.com
- Stats at Basketball Reference

Terence B. Davis II (born May 16, 1997) is an American professional basketball player who most recently played for the Leones de Ponce of the Baloncesto Superior Nacional (BSN). He played college basketball for the Ole Miss Rebels. After going undrafted in the 2019 NBA draft, he signed with the Toronto Raptors and was named to the NBA All-Rookie Second Team in 2020. He has also played for the Sacramento Kings.

== Early life ==
Davis is the son of Trinina Smith and Terence Davis Sr. He began playing basketball at the age of six. He became a star football player at Southaven High School, competing as a wide receiver. Davis also managed to make the state's freestyle swimming finals in 2015. Davis earned twenty scholarship offers from major universities for football but opted to pursue basketball in college instead.

== College career ==
Davis played sparingly as a freshman at Ole Miss, averaging 1.9 points and 6.9 minutes per game. Coach Andy Kennedy's advice was to become a ball-getter and he improved markedly as a sophomore, becoming one of the most improved players in all of college basketball, and scoring 30 points on 6-for-7 three-pointers in an NIT win over Syracuse. He averaged 14.9 points and 5.3 rebounds per game as a sophomore. In his junior season, Davis led the team in scoring with 13.8 points per game, while contributing 6.2 rebounds and 2.1 assists per game.

After the season, coach Kennedy was fired and Kermit Davis, who was named SEC coach of the year in 2019, was tapped as the new coach. As a senior, Davis posted 15.2 points, 5.8 rebounds and 3.5 assists per game while shooting his best three-point percentage and free throw percentage of his career at 37.1% and 77.2%, respectively. He was named SEC player of the week after scoring 27 points and pulling down 12 rebounds, in a win over Auburn on January 9, 2019. Davis was named to the All-SEC second team. During his career at Ole Miss, Davis led the team to the NCAA tournament for the ninth time in school history. After the season Davis participated in the Portsmouth Invitational Tournament and was named to the All-Tournament Team.

== Professional career ==
=== Toronto Raptors (2019–2021) ===
After going undrafted in the 2019 NBA draft, Davis joined the Denver Nuggets for the NBA Summer League. On July 11, 2019, Davis signed a two-year deal with the Toronto Raptors, with a full guarantee in year one. On October 22, 2019, Davis made his debut in NBA, coming off the bench in a 130–122 overtime win over the New Orleans Pelicans with five points, five rebounds, two assists and two steals. On November 20, Davis put up impressive numbers in 113–97 win over the Orlando Magic, scoring 19 points and grabbing 8 rebounds. On January 8, in his first career start, Davis scored 23 points to go along with 11 rebounds and 5 assists, leading the Raptors to a 112–110 overtime win against the Charlotte Hornets. On February 2, 2020, Davis scored a career-high 31 points against the Chicago Bulls. During the NBA hiatus, he worked out in Miami. Including the seeding games in the 2020 NBA Bubble, Davis was the only Raptor to play all 72 regular-season games for the 2019–20 season. On September 15, 2020, Davis was named 2019–20 NBA All-Rookie Second Team by the NBA.

=== Sacramento Kings (2021–2023) ===
On March 25, 2021, Davis was traded to the Sacramento Kings in exchange for a 2021 second-round draft pick. He made his Kings debut two days later, recording six points, two rebounds and two assists in a 100–98 win over the Cleveland Cavaliers.

On August 7, 2021, Davis re-signed with the Kings. He scored a career-high 35 points in a 133–131 loss to the Detroit Pistons on January 19, 2022. On February 1, 2022, Davis underwent wrist surgery and was ruled out for three months, effectively ending the rest of his regular-season run.

On November 15, 2022, Davis scored 31 points, grabbed nine rebounds, and recorded three steals and seven three-pointers at 70% field goal shooting, in a 153–121 win over the Brooklyn Nets.

=== Rip City Remix (2023–2024) ===
On December 11, 2023, Davis joined the Rip City Remix of the NBA G League. However, he left the Remix in January 2024, after suffering a season-ending injury.

=== Wisconsin Herd (2024–2025) ===
On October 2, 2024, Davis signed with the Milwaukee Bucks, but was waived on October 15. On October 28, he joined the Wisconsin Herd.

=== Second stint with Kings (2025) ===
On April 9, 2025, Davis returned to the Sacramento Kings. He was waived by Sacramento prior to the start of the regular season on October 18, and joined the Stockton Kings. Davis was waived by the Kings on February 3, 2026.

On February 6, 2026, he was announced by the Leones de Ponce as their new signing for the upcoming season in Puerto Rico's Baloncesto Superior Nacional. He was released from the team on April 23, when the Leones signed Darius Bazley.

== Career statistics ==
Legend
| GP | Games played | GS | Games started | MPG | Minutes per game |
| FG% | Field goal percentage | 3P% | 3-point field goal percentage | FT% | Free throw percentage |
| RPG | Rebounds per game | APG | Assists per game | SPG | Steals per game |
| BPG | Blocks per game | PPG | Points per game | **Bold** | Career high |

=== NBA ===
==== Regular season ====
| Year | Team | GP | GS | MPG | FG% | 3P% | FT% | RPG | APG | SPG | BPG | PPG |
|---|---|---|---|---|---|---|---|---|---|---|---|---|
| 2019–20 | Toronto | **72** | 4 | 16.8 | **.456** | **.388** | .864 | **3.3** | 1.6 | .5 | .2 | 7.5 |
| 2020–21 | Toronto | 34 | 4 | 14.5 | .414 | .361 | **.889** | 1.9 | 1.1 | .5 | .2 | 6.9 |
| 2020–21 | Sacramento | 27 | 0 | **21.5** | .439 | .372 | .784 | **3.3** | **1.7** | **1.0** | .3 | **11.1** |
| 2021–22 | Sacramento | 30 | **11** | 17.9 | .423 | .329 | .818 | 3.1 | 1.3 | .8 | **.4** | 10.4 |
| 2022–23 | Sacramento | 64 | 5 | 13.1 | .423 | .366 | .791 | 2.2 | 1.0 | .7 | .2 | 6.7 |
| 2024–25 | Sacramento | 1 | 0 | 8.0 | .000 | .000 | .000 | 1.0 | 1.0 | .0 | .0 | 0.0 |
| Career | | 228 | 24 | 16.1 | .433 | .366 | .826 | 2.7 | 1.3 | .7 | .2 | 8.0 |

==== Playoffs ====
| Year | Team | GP | GS | MPG | FG% | 3P% | FT% | RPG | APG | SPG | BPG | PPG |
|---|---|---|---|---|---|---|---|---|---|---|---|---|
| 2020 | Toronto | **6** | 0 | 14.0 | **.483** | **.421** | **1.000** | 2.2 | 1.2 | .2 | .0 | **7.2** |
| 2023 | Sacramento | 4 | 0 | **14.4** | .400 | .353 | **1.000** | **2.3** | **1.5** | **.3** | .0 | 6.0 |
| Career | | 10 | 0 | 14.1 | .449 | .389 | 1.000 | 2.2 | 1.3 | .2 | .0 | 6.7 |

=== College ===
| Year | Team | GP | GS | MPG | FG% | 3P% | FT% | RPG | APG | SPG | BPG | PPG |
|---|---|---|---|---|---|---|---|---|---|---|---|---|
| 2015–16 | Ole Miss | 20 | 0 | 6.6 | .433 | .273 | .368 | .9 | .3 | .4 | .1 | 1.8 |
| 2016–17 | Ole Miss | **36** | 26 | 25.3 | **.482** | .333 | .723 | 5.3 | 1.8 | 1.4 | .5 | 14.9 |
| 2017–18 | Ole Miss | 32 | 24 | 27.3 | .407 | .317 | .720 | **6.2** | 2.1 | .9 | **.9** | 13.8 |
| 2018–19 | Ole Miss | 33 | **32** | **31.0** | .444 | **.371** | **.772** | 5.8 | **3.5** | **1.6** | .6 | **15.2** |
| Career | | 121 | 82 | 24.3 | .445 | .339 | .717 | 4.9 | 2.1 | 1.2 | .6 | 12.5 |

== Personal life ==
Davis was arrested in New York City on October 27, 2020, after allegedly slapping his girlfriend in the face and breaking her cell phone. The charges were reportedly dropped a few months later.
