= 2022–23 Denver Nuggets season =

2022–23 NBA season by team

- NBA champions
- Conference champions
- Division champions
- Head coach: Michael Malone
- President: Josh Kroenke
- General manager: Calvin Booth
- Owner: Ann Walton Kroenke
- Arena: Ball Arena

Results
- Record: 53–29 (.646)
- Place: Division: 1st (Northwest); Conference: 1st (Western)
- Playoff finish: NBA champions (defeated Heat 4–1)
- Stats at Basketball Reference

Local media
- Television: Altitude Sports and Entertainment
- Radio: KKSE

The 2022–23 Denver Nuggets season was the 47th season for the franchise in the National Basketball Association (NBA). The season culminated in a win in the NBA Finals, their first title in franchise history, including their time in the ABA.

On April 5, 2023, the Nuggets clinched the top seed in the Western Conference for the first time in franchise history. In the first round of the playoffs, the Nuggets eliminated their division rivals, the Minnesota Timberwolves, in five games. In the conference semifinals, they defeated the 4th seeded Phoenix Suns in six games to advance to the Western Conference Finals for the second time in four years. The Nuggets made the Finals for the first time in history by sweeping the 7th seeded Los Angeles Lakers in the Conference Finals to advance to the 2023 NBA Finals.

On June 12, 2023, Denver won their first championship in franchise history after a 94–89 win against the Miami Heat, defeating them in 5 games. They joined the San Antonio Spurs as the only former ABA franchises to win a championship in the NBA, although neither team had won a title in the old league. HoopsHype would later rank this squad as the team with the fifth-easiest path to winning the NBA Finals in 2024 (in terms of the records of their opponents) due to the improbable route they had to take to win it all this season (first by beating a #8 seed, then a #4 seed, before beating a #7 seed in the Western Conference Finals and then a #8 seed (who originally started out as a #7 seed before the play-in tournament began) in order to win the NBA Finals).

== Draft ==
Round	Pick	Player	Position(s)	Nationality	College / Club
1	21	Christian Braun	SG	United States	Kansas

The Nuggets own their first round pick; their second-round pick was traded to Minnesota via Philadelphia. A second-round pick Denver traded to the Miami Heat would later be forfeited by them after they violated tampering rules with free agency the previous season.

== Roster ==
2022–23 Denver Nuggets roster
Players

Pos.	No.	Player	Height	Weight	DOB	From
G	0	Christian Braun	6 ft 6 in (1.98 m)	220 lb (100 kg)	2001-04-17	Kansas
G	11	Bruce Brown	6 ft 4 in (1.93 m)	202 lb (92 kg)	1996-08-15	Miami (FL)
C	13	Thomas Bryant	6 ft 10 in (2.08 m)	248 lb (112 kg)	1997-07-31	Indiana
G	5	Kentavious Caldwell-Pope	6 ft 5 in (1.96 m)	204 lb (93 kg)	1993-02-18	Georgia
F	31	Vlatko Čančar	6 ft 8 in (2.03 m)	236 lb (107 kg)	1997-04-10	Slovenia
G	21	Collin Gillespie (TW)	6 ft 1 in (1.85 m)	195 lb (88 kg)	1999-06-25	Villanova
F	50	Aaron Gordon	6 ft 9 in (2.06 m)	235 lb (107 kg)	1995-09-16	Arizona
F	32	Jeff Green	6 ft 8 in (2.03 m)	235 lb (107 kg)	1986-08-28	Georgetown
G	7	Reggie Jackson	6 ft 2 in (1.88 m)	208 lb (94 kg)	1990-04-16	Boston College
C	15	Nikola Jokić	7 ft 0 in (2.13 m)	284 lb (129 kg)	1995-02-19	Serbia
C	6	DeAndre Jordan	6 ft 11 in (2.11 m)	265 lb (120 kg)	1988-07-21	Texas A&M
G	27	Jamal Murray	6 ft 4 in (1.93 m)	215 lb (98 kg)	1997-02-23	Kentucky
F/C	22	Zeke Nnaji	6 ft 11 in (2.11 m)	240 lb (109 kg)	2001-01-09	Arizona
F	1	Michael Porter Jr.	6 ft 10 in (2.08 m)	218 lb (99 kg)	1998-06-29	Missouri
G	14	Ish Smith	6 ft 0 in (1.83 m)	175 lb (79 kg)	1988-07-05	Wake Forest
G/F	8	Peyton Watson	6 ft 7 in (2.01 m)	200 lb (91 kg)	2002-09-11	UCLA
F	10	Jack White (TW)	6 ft 7 in (2.01 m)	225 lb (102 kg)	1997-08-05	Duke

Coaches
Head coach
- Michael Malone
Assistant(s)
- David Adelman
- John Beckett
- Ryan Bowen
- Popeye Jones
- Charles Klask
- Ryan Saunders
- Ognjen Stojaković
- Elvis Valcarcel

Legend
- (DP) Unsigned draft pick
- (FA) Free agent
- (S) Suspended
- (GL) On assignment to G League
- (TW) Two-way affiliate player
- Injured

Roster
Updated: February 14, 2023

== Standings ==
=== Division ===
Northwest Division	W	L	PCT	GB	Home	Road	Div	GP
c – Denver Nuggets	53	29	.646	–	34‍–‍7	19‍–‍22	10–6	82
x – Minnesota Timberwolves	42	40	.512	11.0	22‍–‍19	20‍–‍21	8–8	82
pi – Oklahoma City Thunder	40	42	.488	13.0	24‍–‍17	16‍–‍25	9–7	82
Utah Jazz	37	45	.451	16.0	23‍–‍18	14‍–‍27	6–10	82
Portland Trail Blazers	33	49	.402	20.0	17‍–‍24	16‍–‍25	7–9	82

=== Conference ===
Western Conference
#	Team	W	L	PCT	GB	GP
1	c – Denver Nuggets *	53	29	.646	–	82
2	y – Memphis Grizzlies *	51	31	.622	2.0	82
3	y – Sacramento Kings *	48	34	.585	5.0	82
4	x – Phoenix Suns	45	37	.549	8.0	82
5	x – Los Angeles Clippers	44	38	.537	9.0	82
6	x – Golden State Warriors	44	38	.537	9.0	82
7	x – Los Angeles Lakers	43	39	.524	10.0	82
8	x – Minnesota Timberwolves	42	40	.512	11.0	82
9	pi – New Orleans Pelicans	42	40	.512	11.0	82
10	pi – Oklahoma City Thunder	40	42	.488	13.0	82
11	Dallas Mavericks	38	44	.463	15.0	82
12	Utah Jazz	37	45	.451	16.0	82
13	Portland Trail Blazers	33	49	.402	20.0	82
14	Houston Rockets	22	60	.268	31.0	82
15	San Antonio Spurs	22	60	.268	31.0	82

== Game log ==
=== Preseason ===
2022 preseason game log
Total: 3–2 (Home: 1–1; Road: 2–1)
Preseason: 3–2 (home: 1–1; road: 2–1)

Game	Date	Team	Score	High points	High rebounds	High assists	Location Attendance	Record
1	October 3	Oklahoma City	L 101–112	Zeke Nnaji (15)	Nnaji, Jordan (6)	Jokić, Green (3)	Ball Arena; 12,432	0–1
2	October 7	@ Chicago	L 113–131	Bones Hyland (24)	DeAndre Jordan (10)	Murray, Smith (5)	United Center; 20,305	0–2
3	October 10	Phoenix	W 107–105	Ish Smith (17)	DeAndre Jordan (10)	Ish Smith (7)	Ball Arena; 12,505	1–2
4	October 12	@ L.A. Clippers	W 126–115	Ish Smith (15)	Zeke Nnaji (8)	Ish Smith (8)	Toyota Arena; 8,812	2–2
5	October 14	@ Golden State	W 119–112	Bones Hyland (18)	Aaron Gordon (12)	Aaron Gordon (7)	Chase Center; N/A (Note: Spectators were in attendance, but the exact number was not reported.)	3–2

2022–23 preseason schedule

=== Regular season ===
2022–23 game log
Total: 53–29 (Home: 34–7; Road: 19–22)
October: 4–3 (home: 3–0; road: 1–3)

Game	Date	Team	Score	High points	High rebounds	High assists	Location Attendance	Record
1	October 19	@ Utah	L 102–123	Nikola Jokić (27)	Aaron Gordon (10)	Jokić, Caldwell-Pope (6)	Vivint Arena; 18,206	0–1
2	October 21	@ Golden State	W 128–123	Nikola Jokić (26)	Nikola Jokić (12)	Nikola Jokić (10)	Chase Center; 18,064	1–1
3	October 22	Oklahoma City	W 122–117	Michael Porter Jr. (22)	Nikola Jokić (16)	Nikola Jokić (13)	Ball Arena; 19,983	2–1
4	October 24	@ Portland	L 110–135	Aaron Gordon (26)	Nikola Jokić (9)	Nikola Jokić (9)	Moda Center; 18,111	2–2
5	October 26	L.A. Lakers	W 110–99	Nikola Jokić (31)	Nikola Jokić (13)	Nikola Jokić (9)	Ball Arena; 19,520	3–2
6	October 28	Utah	W 117–101	Bones Hyland (26)	Jordan, Porter Jr. (13)	Nikola Jokić (6)	Ball Arena; 19,560	4–2
7	October 30	@ L.A. Lakers	L 110–121	Nikola Jokić (23)	Nikola Jokić (14)	Nikola Jokić (6)	Crypto.com Arena; 18,997	4–3

November: 10–4 (home: 3–2; road: 7–2)

Game	Date	Team	Score	High points	High rebounds	High assists	Location Attendance	Record
8	November 3	@ Oklahoma City	W 122–110	Aaron Gordon (27)	Nikola Jokić (13)	Nikola Jokić (14)	Paycom Center; 13,791	5–3
9	November 5	San Antonio	W 126–101	Bones Hyland (24)	Michael Porter Jr. (9)	Nikola Jokić (10)	Ball Arena; 19,641	6–3
10	November 7	@ San Antonio	W 115–109	Nikola Jokić (26)	Jokić, Jordan (8)	Nikola Jokić (10)	AT&T Center; 11,574	7–3
11	November 9	@ Indiana	W 122–119	Nikola Jokić (24)	Aaron Gordon (17)	Gordon, Jokić (6)	Gainbridge Fieldhouse; 14,069	8–3
12	November 11	@ Boston	L 112–131	Nikola Jokić (29)	Bruce Brown (10)	Jamal Murray (10)	TD Garden; 19,156	8–4
13	November 13	@ Chicago	W 126–103	Michael Porter Jr. (31)	Bruce Brown (11)	Nikola Jokić (14)	United Center; 21,602	9–4
14	November 16	New York	L 103–106	Hyland, Murray (21)	Jamal Murray (9)	Jamal Murray (6)	Ball Arena; 18,210	9–5
15	November 18	@ Dallas	L 99–127	Brown, Caldwell-Pope (18)	DeAndre Jordan (7)	Bruce Brown (7)	American Airlines Center; 20,135	9–6
16	November 20	@ Dallas	W 98–97	Bones Hyland (29)	DeAndre Jordan (17)	Bruce Brown (8)	American Airlines Center; 20,244	10–6
17	November 22	Detroit	L 108–110	Nikola Jokić (31)	Nikola Jokić (9)	Nikola Jokić (10)	Ball Arena; 19,635	10–7
18	November 23	@ Oklahoma City	W 131–126 (OT)	Nikola Jokić (39)	Bruce Brown (13)	Bruce Brown (10)	Paycom Center; 13,656	11–7
19	November 25	@ L.A. Clippers	W 114–104	Aaron Gordon (29)	Nikola Jokić (13)	Jamal Murray (9)	Crypto.com Arena; 16,559	12–7
20	November 28	Houston	W 129–113	Nikola Jokić (32)	Nikola Jokić (12)	Jokić, Smith (8)	Ball Arena; 16,027	13–7
21	November 30	Houston	W 120–100	Jamal Murray (26)	Nikola Jokić (9)	Nikola Jokić (12)	Ball Arena; 16,286	14–7

December: 9–5 (home: 7–1; road: 2–4)

Game	Date	Team	Score	High points	High rebounds	High assists	Location Attendance	Record
22	December 2	@ Atlanta	L 109–117	Nikola Jokić (24)	Nikola Jokić (10)	Nikola Jokić (8)	State Farm Arena; 16,974	14–8
23	December 4	@ New Orleans	L 106–121	Nikola Jokić (32)	Nikola Jokić (16)	Nikola Jokić (9)	Smoothie King Center; 15,658	14–9
24	December 6	Dallas	L 115–116	Aaron Gordon (27)	Gordon, Jokić (8)	Nikola Jokić (8)	Ball Arena; 19,520	14–10
25	December 8	@ Portland	W 121–120	Nikola Jokić (33)	Nikola Jokić (10)	Nikola Jokić (9)	Moda Center; 18,189	15–10
26	December 10	Utah	W 115–110	Nikola Jokić (31)	Nikola Jokić (12)	Nikola Jokić (14)	Ball Arena; 19,636	16–10
27	December 14	Washington	W 141–128	Nikola Jokić (43)	Nikola Jokić (14)	Nikola Jokić (8)	Ball Arena; 19,550	17–10
28	December 16	@ L.A. Lakers	L 108–126	Nikola Jokić (25)	Nikola Jokić (11)	Nikola Jokić (8)	Crypto.com Arena; 18,505	17–11
29	December 18	Charlotte	W 119–115	Nikola Jokić (40)	Nikola Jokić (27)	Jamal Murray (11)	Ball Arena; 19,235	18–11
30	December 20	Memphis	W 105–91	Aaron Gordon (24)	Nikola Jokić (13)	Nikola Jokić (13)	Ball Arena; 19,605	19–11
31	December 23	Portland	W 120–107	Nikola Jokić (29)	Jokić, Murray (8)	Jamal Murray (12)	Ball Arena; 19,619	20–11
32	December 25	Phoenix	W 128–125 (OT)	Nikola Jokić (41)	Nikola Jokić (15)	Nikola Jokić (15)	Ball Arena; 19,642	21–11
33	December 27	@ Sacramento	W 113–106	Michael Porter Jr. (30)	Nikola Jokić (9)	Nikola Jokić (11)	Golden 1 Center; 17,937	22–11
34	December 28	@ Sacramento	L 126–127	Nikola Jokić (40)	Jokić, Jordan, Porter Jr. (7)	Bones Hyland (11)	Golden 1 Center; 17,985	22–12
35	December 30	Miami	W 124–119	Kentavious Caldwell-Pope (20)	Nikola Jokić (12)	Nikola Jokić (12)	Ball Arena; 19,638	23–12

January: 12–4 (home: 10–1; road: 2–3)

Game	Date	Team	Score	High points	High rebounds	High assists	Location Attendance	Record
36	January 1	Boston	W 123–111	Nikola Jokić (30)	Nikola Jokić (12)	Nikola Jokić (12)	Ball Arena; 19,641	24–12
37	January 2	@ Minnesota	L 111–124	Nikola Jokić (24)	Aaron Gordon (16)	Nikola Jokić (9)	Target Center; 15,962	24–13
38	January 5	L.A. Clippers	W 122–91	Jamal Murray (18)	Vlatko Čančar (12)	Nikola Jokić (9)	Ball Arena; 19,087	25–13
39	January 6	Cleveland	W 121–108	Nikola Jokić (28)	Nikola Jokić (15)	Nikola Jokić (10)	Ball Arena; 19,638	26–13
40	January 9	L.A. Lakers	W 122–109	Jamal Murray (34)	Nikola Jokić (11)	Nikola Jokić (16)	Ball Arena; 19,609	27–13
41	January 11	Phoenix	W 126–97	Hyland, Jokić (21)	Nikola Jokić (18)	Nikola Jokić (9)	Ball Arena; 18,872	28–13
42	January 13	@ L.A. Clippers	W 115–103	Jamal Murray (24)	Jamal Murray (8)	Aaron Gordon (5)	Crypto.com Arena; 16,005	29–13
43	January 15	Orlando	W 119–116	Aaron Gordon (25)	Nikola Jokić (10)	Nikola Jokić (14)	Ball Arena; 19,641	30–13
44	January 17	Portland	W 122–113	Nikola Jokić (36)	Nikola Jokić (12)	Nikola Jokić (10)	Ball Arena; 18,258	31–13
45	January 18	Minnesota	W 122–118	Nikola Jokić (31)	Nikola Jokić (11)	Nikola Jokić (13)	Ball Arena; 16,112	32–13
46	January 20	Indiana	W 134–111	Aaron Gordon (28)	Jamal Murray (10)	Jamal Murray (14)	Ball Arena; 19,609	33–13
47	January 22	Oklahoma City	L 99–101	Jamal Murray (26)	Gordon, Nnaji (10)	Jamal Murray (9)	Ball Arena; 19,557	33–14
48	January 24	@ New Orleans	W 99–98	Jokić, Murray (25)	Nikola Jokić (11)	Nikola Jokić (10)	Smoothie King Center; 14,699	34–14
49	January 25	@ Milwaukee	L 99–107	Aaron Gordon (24)	Aaron Gordon (14)	Brown, Gordon (4)	Fiserv Forum; 17,352	34–15
50	January 28	@ Philadelphia	L 119–126	Nikola Jokić (24)	Nikola Jokić (8)	Nikola Jokić (9)	Wells Fargo Center; 21,255	34–16
51	January 31	New Orleans	W 122–113	Jamal Murray (32)	Nikola Jokić (18)	Nikola Jokić (15)	Ball Arena; 18,868	35–16

February: 9–3 (home: 5–0; road: 4–3)

Game	Date	Team	Score	High points	High rebounds	High assists	Location Attendance	Record
52	February 2	Golden State	W 134–117	Jamal Murray (33)	Nikola Jokić (14)	Nikola Jokić (16)	Ball Arena; 19,555	36–16
53	February 4	Atlanta	W 128–108	Jamal Murray (41)	Nikola Jokić (18)	Nikola Jokić (10)	Ball Arena; 19,630	37–16
54	February 5	@ Minnesota	L 98–128	Michael Porter Jr. (22)	Ish Smith (7)	Bruce Brown (7)	Target Center; 17,136	37–17
55	February 7	Minnesota	W 146–112	Michael Porter Jr. (30)	Nikola Jokić (12)	Nikola Jokić (16)	Ball Arena; 18,307	38–17
56	February 9	@ Orlando	L 104–115	Aaron Gordon (37)	Aaron Gordon (14)	Nikola Jokić (6)	Amway Center; 18,846	38–18
57	February 11	@ Charlotte	W 119–105	Nikola Jokić (30)	Nikola Jokić (16)	Nikola Jokić (10)	Spectrum Center; 19,256	39–18
58	February 13	@ Miami	W 112–108	Nikola Jokić (27)	Nikola Jokić (12)	Nikola Jokić (8)	Miami-Dade Arena; 19,755	40–18
59	February 15	Dallas	W 118–109	Jeff Green (24)	Nikola Jokić (13)	Nikola Jokić (10)	Ball Arena; 19,627	41–18
All-Star Break
60	February 23	@ Cleveland	W 115–109	Michael Porter Jr. (25)	Nikola Jokić (18)	Nikola Jokić (13)	Rocket Mortgage FieldHouse; 19,432	42–18
61	February 25	@ Memphis	L 94–112	Nikola Jokić (15)	Nikola Jokić (13)	Jamal Murray (4)	FedExForum; 18,302	42–19
62	February 26	L.A. Clippers	W 134–124 (OT)	Nikola Jokić (40)	Nikola Jokić (17)	Jamal Murray (12)	Ball Arena; 19,689	43–19
63	February 28	@ Houston	W 133–112	Jamal Murray (33)	Nikola Jokić (11)	Nikola Jokić (10)	Toyota Center; 15,368	44–19

March: 7–7 (home: 4–3; road: 3–4)

Game	Date	Team	Score	High points	High rebounds	High assists	Location Attendance	Record
64	March 3	Memphis	W 113–97	Michael Porter Jr. (26)	Nikola Jokić (18)	Nikola Jokić (10)	Ball Arena; 19,641	45–19
65	March 6	Toronto	W 118–113	Jamal Murray (24)	Nikola Jokić (13)	Nikola Jokić (9)	Ball Arena; 19,520	46–19
66	March 8	Chicago	L 96–117	Nikola Jokić (18)	Nikola Jokić (12)	Nikola Jokić (8)	Ball Arena; 19,896	46–20
67	March 10	@ San Antonio	L 120–128	Nikola Jokić (37)	Nikola Jokić (11)	Nikola Jokić (11)	AT&T Center; 18,354	46–21
68	March 12	Brooklyn	L 120–122	Nikola Jokić (35)	Nikola Jokić (20)	Nikola Jokić (11)	Ball Arena; 19,739	46–22
69	March 14	@ Toronto	L 110–125	Nikola Jokić (28)	Nikola Jokić (8)	Jamal Murray (9)	Scotiabank Arena; 19,800	46–23
70	March 16	@ Detroit	W 119–100	Nikola Jokić (30)	Nikola Jokić (10)	Jamal Murray (10)	Little Caesars Arena; 17,987	47–23
71	March 18	@ New York	L 110–116	Jamal Murray (25)	Nikola Jokić (10)	Nikola Jokić (8)	Madison Square Garden; 19,812	47–24
72	March 19	@ Brooklyn	W 108–102	Michael Porter Jr. (28)	Nikola Jokić (17)	Nikola Jokić (10)	Barclays Center; 18,235	48–24
73	March 22	@ Washington	W 118–104	Nikola Jokić (31)	Nikola Jokić (12)	Jamal Murray (8)	Capital One Arena; 16,508	49–24
74	March 25	Milwaukee	W 129–106	Nikola Jokić (31)	Kentavious Caldwell-Pope (8)	Nikola Jokić (11)	Ball Arena; 19,919	50–24
75	March 27	Philadelphia	W 116–111	Nikola Jokić (25)	Nikola Jokić (17)	Nikola Jokić (12)	Ball Arena; 19,781	51–24
76	March 30	New Orleans	L 88–107	Jamal Murray (21)	Jeff Green (7)	Jamal Murray (7)	Ball Arena; 19,728	51–25
77	March 31	@ Phoenix	L 93–100	Aaron Gordon (26)	DeAndre Jordan (12)	Aaron Gordon (6)	Footprint Center; 17,071	51–26

April: 2–3 (home: 2–0; road: 0–3)

Game	Date	Team	Score	High points	High rebounds	High assists	Location Attendance	Record
78	April 2	Golden State	W 112–110	Michael Porter Jr. (29)	Michael Porter Jr. (11)	Jamal Murray (8)	Ball Arena; 19,752	52–26
79	April 4	@ Houston	L 103–124	Michael Porter Jr. (23)	Nikola Jokić (10)	Gordon, Jokić, Murray (4)	Toyota Center; 16,924	52–27
80	April 6	@ Phoenix	L 115–119	Bruce Brown (31)	DeAndre Jordan (11)	Jackson, Smith (6)	Footprint Center; 17,071	52–28
81	April 8	@ Utah	L 114–118	Kentavious Caldwell-Pope (21)	Nikola Jokić (10)	Nikola Jokić (10)	Vivint Arena; 18,206	52–29
82	April 9	Sacramento	W 109–95	Bruce Brown (21)	Bryant, Jordan, White (8)	Ish Smith (9)	Ball Arena; 19,652	53–29

2022–23 season schedule

=== Playoffs ===
2023 playoff game log
Total: 16–4 (Home: 10–1; Road: 6–3)
First Round: 4–1 (home: 3–0; road: 1–1)

Game	Date	Team	Score	High points	High rebounds	High assists	Location Attendance	Series
1	April 16	Minnesota	W 109–80	Jamal Murray (24)	Nikola Jokić (14)	Jamal Murray (8)	Ball Arena; 19,628	1–0
2	April 19	Minnesota	W 122–113	Jamal Murray (40)	Aaron Gordon (10)	Nikola Jokić (9)	Ball Arena; 19,683	2–0
3	April 21	@ Minnesota	W 120–111	Michael Porter Jr. (25)	Nikola Jokić (11)	Nikola Jokić (12)	Target Center; 19,536	3–0
4	April 23	@ Minnesota	L 108–114 (OT)	Nikola Jokić (43)	Nikola Jokić (11)	Nikola Jokić (6)	Target Center; 18,978	3–1
5	April 25	Minnesota	W 112–109	Jamal Murray (35)	Nikola Jokić (17)	Nikola Jokić (12)	Ball Arena; 19,691	4–1

Conference Semifinals: 4–2 (home: 3–0; road: 1–2)

Game	Date	Team	Score	High points	High rebounds	High assists	Location Attendance	Series
1	April 29	Phoenix	W 125–107	Jamal Murray (34)	Nikola Jokić (19)	Jamal Murray (9)	Ball Arena; 19,762	1–0
2	May 1	Phoenix	W 97–87	Nikola Jokić (39)	Nikola Jokić (16)	Jamal Murray (8)	Ball Arena; 19,592	2–0
3	May 5	@ Phoenix	L 114–121	Jamal Murray (32)	Nikola Jokić (17)	Nikola Jokić (17)	Footprint Center; 17,071	2–1
4	May 7	@ Phoenix	L 124–129	Nikola Jokić (53)	Michael Porter Jr. (10)	Nikola Jokić (11)	Footprint Center; 17,071	2–2
5	May 9	Phoenix	W 118–102	Nikola Jokić (29)	Nikola Jokić (13)	Nikola Jokić (12)	Ball Arena; 19,773	3–2
6	May 11	@ Phoenix	W 125–100	Nikola Jokić (32)	Nikola Jokić (10)	Nikola Jokić (12)	Footprint Center; 17,071	4–2

Conference Finals: 4–0 (home: 2–0; road: 2–0)

Game	Date	Team	Score	High points	High rebounds	High assists	Location Attendance	Series
1	May 16	L.A. Lakers	W 132–126	Nikola Jokić (34)	Nikola Jokić (21)	Nikola Jokić (14)	Ball Arena; 19,633	1–0
2	May 18	L.A. Lakers	W 108–103	Jamal Murray (37)	Nikola Jokić (17)	Nikola Jokić (12)	Ball Arena; 19,742	2–0
3	May 20	@ L.A. Lakers	W 119–108	Jamal Murray (37)	Michael Porter Jr. (10)	Nikola Jokić (8)	Crypto.com Arena; 18,997	3–0
4	May 22	@ L.A. Lakers	W 113–111	Nikola Jokić (30)	Nikola Jokić (14)	Nikola Jokić (13)	Crypto.com Arena; 18,997	4–0

NBA Finals: 4–1 (home: 2–1; road: 2–0)

Game	Date	Team	Score	High points	High rebounds	High assists	Location Attendance	Series
1	June 1	Miami	W 104–93	Nikola Jokić (27)	Michael Porter Jr. (13)	Nikola Jokić (14)	Ball Arena; 19,528	1–0
2	June 4	Miami	L 108–111	Nikola Jokić (41)	Nikola Jokić (11)	Jamal Murray (10)	Ball Arena; 19,537	1–1
3	June 7	@ Miami	W 109–94	Jamal Murray (34)	Nikola Jokić (21)	Jokić, Murray (10)	Kaseya Center; 20,019	2–1
4	June 9	@ Miami	W 108–95	Aaron Gordon (27)	Nikola Jokić (12)	Jamal Murray (12)	Kaseya Center; 20,184	3–1
5	June 12	Miami	W 94–89	Nikola Jokić (28)	Nikola Jokić (16)	Jamal Murray (8)	Ball Arena; 19,537	4–1

2023 playoff schedule

== Player statistics ==
Legend
GP	Games played	GS	Games started	MPG	Minutes per game
FG%	Field-goal percentage	3P%	3-point field-goal percentage	FT%	Free-throw percentage
RPG	Rebounds per game	APG	Assists per game	SPG	Steals per game
BPG	Blocks per game	PPG	Points per game

=== Regular season ===
Denver Nuggets statistics
Player	GP	GS	MPG	FG%	3P%	FT%	RPG	APG	SPG	BPG	PPG
Christian Braun	76	6	15.5	.495	.354	.625	2.4	.8	.5	.2	4.7
Bruce Brown	80	31	28.5	.483	.358	.758	4.1	3.4	1.1	.6	11.5
Thomas Bryant	18	1	11.4	.485	.444	.722	3.3	.1	.1	.4	4.6
Kentavious Caldwell-Pope	76	76	31.3	.462	.423	.824	2.7	2.4	1.5	.5	10.8
Vlatko Čančar	60	9	14.8	.476	.374	.927	2.1	1.3	.4	.2	5.0
Aaron Gordon	68	68	30.2	.564	.347	.608	6.6	3.0	.8	.8	16.3
Jeff Green	56	4	19.5	.488	.288	.744	2.6	1.2	.3	.3	7.8
Bones Hyland	42	1	19.5	.399	.378	.866	2.0	3.0	.7	.3	12.1
Reggie Jackson	16	2	19.9	.383	.279	.833	1.8	3.1	.6	.1	7.9
Nikola Jokić	69	69	33.7	.632	.383	.822	11.8	9.8	1.3	.7	24.5
DeAndre Jordan	39	8	15.0	.765	1.000	.458	5.2	.9	.3	.6	5.1
Jamal Murray	65	65	32.8	.454	.398	.833	4.0	6.2	1.0	.2	20.0
Zeke Nnaji	53	5	13.7	.561	.262	.645	2.6	.3	.3	.4	5.2
Michael Porter Jr.	62	62	29.0	.487	.414	.800	5.5	1.0	.6	.5	17.4
Davon Reed	35	1	9.0	.313	.364	.750	1.6	.5	.4	.1	2.3
Ish Smith	43	0	9.3	.397	.167	.500	1.3	2.3	.2	.2	2.5
Peyton Watson	23	2	8.1	.492	.429	.550	1.6	.5	.1	.5	3.3
Jack White	17	0	3.9	.421	.333	.667	1.0	.2	.2	.1	1.2

=== Playoffs ===
Denver Nuggets statistics
Player	GP	GS	MPG	FG%	3P%	FT%	RPG	APG	SPG	BPG	PPG
Christian Braun	19	0	13.0	.533	.200	.579	2.1	.6	.6	.2	3.2
Bruce Brown	20	0	26.6	.511	.316	.857	4.0	1.9	1.1	.5	12.0
Thomas Bryant	1	0	.5	–	–	–	.0	.0	.0	.0	.0
Kentavious Caldwell-Pope	20	20	33.5	.457	.380	.829	3.3	1.6	1.3	.7	10.6
Vlatko Čančar	5	0	2.0	.000	.000	–	.6	.2	.0	.0	.0
Aaron Gordon	20	20	35.6	.518	.391	.652	6.0	2.6	.6	.7	13.3
Jeff Green	20	0	17.2	.452	.321	.895	1.6	.7	.3	.4	4.1
Reggie Jackson	6	0	3.0	.500	.500	–	.3	.3	.2	.0	.5
Nikola Jokić	20	20	39.4	.548	.461	.799	13.5	9.5	1.1	1.0	30.0
DeAndre Jordan	4	0	3.4	.667	–	.500	1.0	.3	.0	.3	1.3
Jamal Murray	20	20	39.9	.473	.396	.926	5.7	7.1	1.5	.3	26.1
Zeke Nnaji	5	0	2.4	.500	.333	–	.4	.0	.2	.0	1.0
Michael Porter Jr.	20	20	32.6	.423	.351	.793	8.1	1.6	.5	.6	13.4
Ish Smith	4	0	2.9	.500	–	–	.3	.3	.0	.0	.5
Peyton Watson	5	0	2.7	.400	.500	–	.8	.2	.0	.2	1.0

== Transactions ==
=== Overview ===
Players Added

Via draft

- Christian Braun

Via trade

- Peyton Watson
- Kentavious Caldwell-Pope
- Ish Smith
- Ismaël Kamagate
- Thomas Bryant

Via free agency

- Collin Gillespie
- Bruce Brown
- DeAndre Jordan
- Jack White
- Reggie Jackson
Players Lost

Via trade

- JaMychal Green
- Will Barton
- Monté Morris
- Bones Hyland
- Davon Reed

Via free agency

- Bryn Forbes
- Markus Howard
- Austin Rivers
- Facundo Campazzo
- DeMarcus Cousins

=== Trades ===
June 23, 2022
To Denver Nuggets

Draft rights to Peyton Watson (No. 30)
2023 second-round pick (Note: The second-best of the picks originally belonging to Oklahoma City, Washington, and Dallas/Miami (better of the two).)
2024 second-round pick (Note: The better of the picks originally belonging to Charlotte and Minnesota.)
To Oklahoma City Thunder

JaMychal Green
2027 protected first-round pick (Note: At least two years after Denver conveys its pick to Orlando, it will convey this pick to Oklahoma City. The earliest possible date is 2027 (if No. 6–30), rolling over to 2028 and 2029 with same protection; if not conveyed by 2029, it will convert to Denver's 2029 second-round pick.)
July 6, 2022
To Denver Nuggets

Kentavious Caldwell-Pope
Ish Smith
To Washington Wizards

Will Barton
Monté Morris
July 6, 2022
To Denver Nuggets

Draft rights to Ismaël Kamagate (No. 46)
To Portland Trail Blazers

2024 second-round pick (Note: The better of the picks originally belonging to Charlotte and Minnesota.)
February 9, 2023
Four-team trade
To Denver Nuggets

Thomas Bryant (from Lakers)

To Los Angeles Clippers

Bones Hyland (from Denver)

To Los Angeles Lakers

Mo Bamba (from Orlando)
Davon Reed (from Denver)
2024 LAC second-round pick (from Clippers)
2025 LAC second-round pick (from Clippers)

To Orlando Magic

Patrick Beverley (from Lakers)
2024 DEN second-round pick (from Denver)
Cash considerations (from Lakers)

=== Free agency ===
==== Re-signed ====
Date	Player	Signed	Ref.
July 7, 2022	Vlatko Čančar	3-year contract	
July 8, 2022	Nikola Jokić	5-year extension	
July 9, 2022	Davon Reed	2-year contract	
July 17, 2022	Kentavious Caldwell-Pope	2-year extension	

==== Additions ====
Date	Player	Former team	Ref.
July 3, 2022	Collin Gillespie (two-way)	Villanova	
July 7, 2022	Bruce Brown	Brooklyn Nets	
July 12, 2022	DeAndre Jordan	Philadelphia 76ers	
July 19, 2022	Jack White (two-way)	Melbourne United (Australia)	
February 14, 2023	Reggie Jackson	Charlotte Hornets	

==== Subtractions ====
Date	Player	Reason left	New team	Ref.
July 12, 2022	Bryn Forbes	Free Agent	Minnesota Timberwolves	
July 17, 2022	Markus Howard	Free Agent	Saski Baskonia (Spain)	
July 21, 2022	Austin Rivers	Free Agent	Minnesota Timberwolves	
October 18, 2022	Facundo Campazzo	Free Agent	Dallas Mavericks	
April 11, 2023	DeMarcus Cousins	Free Agent	Guaynabo Mets (Puerto Rico)	
