= 2022–23 Sacramento Kings season =

- Division champions
- Head coach: Mike Brown
- President: John Rinehart
- General manager: Monte McNair
- Owner: Vivek Ranadivé
- Arena: Golden 1 Center

Results
- Record: 48–34 (.585)
- Place: Division: 1st (Pacific); Conference: 3rd (Western)
- Playoff finish: First round (lost to Warriors 3–4)
- Stats at Basketball Reference

Local media
- Television: NBC Sports California; CBS 13
- Radio: KHTK Sports 1140

The 2022–23 Sacramento Kings season was the 78th season for the franchise in the National Basketball Association (NBA), and 39th season in the city of Sacramento. On April 11, 2022, the Sacramento Kings relieved interim head coach Alvin Gentry of his duties. Gentry was named interim head coach after the team fired Luke Walton in November 2021. On May 9, 2022, the Sacramento Kings hired Golden State Warriors assistant coach Mike Brown to become the Kings' new head coach. After the Seattle Mariners of MLB qualified for the Playoffs for the first time since 2001, the Kings entered this season with the longest active postseason drought in the four major North American sports with their last playoff appearance in 2006. Despite starting 0–4, they improved on their 30–52 record from last year by winning their 31st game on February 8, and won their first Pacific Division title since 2003, after putting an end to an NBA-record 16 season-long playoff drought. The longest active playoff drought in the four major North American Sports now belongs to the New York Jets of NFL with the team missing the playoffs 15 years straight. Meanwhile, the Charlotte Hornets now owned the longest playoffs drought in NBA with their last appearance in 2016.

On February 24, 2023, the Kings won the second-highest scoring game in NBA history, winning a 176–175 double-overtime match over the Los Angeles Clippers. On March 12, against the Suns, the Kings reached the 40-win mark for the first time since the 2005–06 season. Three days later, the Kings won their 41st game, ending an NBA-record of 16 consecutive losing seasons. The day after winning their 41st game, they secured their first winning season in 17 years with their win over the Brooklyn Nets. On March 29, the Kings clinched their first postseason berth since 2006 with their win over the Portland Trail Blazers, ending the longest playoff drought in NBA history and the longest active postseason drought in the four major North American sports. On April 4, the Kings secured their first Pacific Division championship since the 2002–03 NBA season with a win over the New Orleans Pelicans. Mike Brown was named the first ever unanimous NBA Coach of the Year for his work with the Kings this season.

The Kings faced the defending champions in the first round, the Golden State Warriors. Despite winning the first two games of the series, the Kings would then lose the next three games and Game 7 and were eliminated from the playoffs, becoming the first Pacific division champion to be eliminated in the first round since the 2012–13 Los Angeles Clippers.

== Draft picks ==
Round	Pick	Player	Position	Nationality	College / Club
1	4	Keegan Murray	Power forward	United States	Iowa

== Roster ==
2022–23 Sacramento Kings roster
Players

Pos.	No.	Player	Height	Weight	DOB	From
F	40	Harrison Barnes	6 ft 8 in (2.03 m)	225 lb (102 kg)	1992-05-30	North Carolina
G	3	Terence Davis	6 ft 4 in (1.93 m)	201 lb (91 kg)	1997-05-16	Mississippi
G	8	Matthew Dellavedova	6 ft 3 in (1.91 m)	200 lb (91 kg)	1990-09-08	Saint Mary's
G	35	PJ Dozier	6 ft 6 in (1.98 m)	205 lb (93 kg)	1996-10-25	South Carolina
F	17	Kessler Edwards	6 ft 7 in (2.01 m)	203 lb (92 kg)	2000-08-09	Pepperdine
G	23	Keon Ellis (TW)	6 ft 3 in (1.91 m)	167 lb (76 kg)	2000-01-08	Alabama
G	5	De'Aaron Fox	6 ft 3 in (1.91 m)	185 lb (84 kg)	1997-12-20	Kentucky
F	22	Richaun Holmes	6 ft 10 in (2.08 m)	235 lb (107 kg)	1993-10-15	Bowling Green
G	9	Kevin Huerter	6 ft 7 in (2.01 m)	198 lb (90 kg)	1998-08-27	Maryland
C	25	Alex Len	7 ft 2 in (2.18 m)	250 lb (113 kg)	1993-06-16	Maryland
F	41	Trey Lyles	6 ft 9 in (2.06 m)	234 lb (106 kg)	1995-11-05	Kentucky
F/C	7	Chimezie Metu	6 ft 11 in (2.11 m)	225 lb (102 kg)	1997-03-22	USC
G	15	Davion Mitchell	6 ft 0 in (1.83 m)	202 lb (92 kg)	1998-09-05	Baylor
G	0	Malik Monk	6 ft 3 in (1.91 m)	200 lb (91 kg)	1998-02-04	Kentucky
F	13	Keegan Murray	6 ft 8 in (2.03 m)	225 lb (102 kg)	2000-08-19	Iowa
C	88	Neemias Queta (TW)	7 ft 0 in (2.13 m)	248 lb (112 kg)	1999-07-13	Utah State
C	10	Domantas Sabonis	7 ft 1 in (2.16 m)	240 lb (109 kg)	1996-05-03	Gonzaga

Coaches
Head coach
- Mike Brown
Assistant(s)
- Leandro Barbosa
- Doug Christie
- Deividas Dulkys
- Jordi Fernández (associate HC)
- Dutch Gaitley
- Lindsey Harding
- Luke Loucks
- Jay Triano

Legend
- (DP) Unsigned draft pick
- (FA) Free agent
- (S) Suspended
- (GL) On assignment to G League affiliate
- (TW) Two-way affiliate player
- Injured

Roster
Updated: February 23, 2023

== Standings ==
=== Division ===
Pacific Division	W	L	PCT	GB	Home	Road	Div	GP
y – Sacramento Kings	48	34	.585	–	23‍–‍18	25‍–‍16	9–7	82
x – Phoenix Suns	45	37	.549	3.0	28‍–‍13	17‍–‍24	9–7	82
x – Los Angeles Clippers	44	38	.537	4.0	23‍–‍18	21‍–‍20	9–7	82
x – Golden State Warriors	44	38	.537	4.0	33‍–‍8	11‍–‍30	7–9	82
x – Los Angeles Lakers	43	39	.524	5.0	23‍–‍18	20‍–‍21	6–10	82

=== Conference ===
Western Conference
#	Team	W	L	PCT	GB	GP
1	c – Denver Nuggets *	53	29	.646	–	82
2	y – Memphis Grizzlies *	51	31	.622	2.0	82
3	y – Sacramento Kings *	48	34	.585	5.0	82
4	x – Phoenix Suns	45	37	.549	8.0	82
5	x – Los Angeles Clippers	44	38	.537	9.0	82
6	x – Golden State Warriors	44	38	.537	9.0	82
7	x – Los Angeles Lakers	43	39	.524	10.0	82
8	x – Minnesota Timberwolves	42	40	.512	11.0	82
9	pi – New Orleans Pelicans	42	40	.512	11.0	82
10	pi – Oklahoma City Thunder	40	42	.488	13.0	82
11	Dallas Mavericks	38	44	.463	15.0	82
12	Utah Jazz	37	45	.451	16.0	82
13	Portland Trail Blazers	33	49	.402	20.0	82
14	Houston Rockets	22	60	.268	31.0	82
15	San Antonio Spurs	22	60	.268	31.0	82

== Game log ==
=== Preseason ===
2022 preseason game log
Total: 4–0 (home: 2–0; road: 2–0)
Preseason: 4–0 (home: 2–0; road: 2–0)

Game	Date	Team	Score	High points	High rebounds	High assists	Location Attendance	Record
1	October 3	@ L.A. Lakers	W 105–75	Keegan Murray (16)	Monk, Murray (6)	Dellavedova, Mitchell (3)	Crypto.com Arena; 17,919	1–0
2	October 9	Portland	W 126–94	Keegan Murray (16)	Domantas Sabonis (7)	Davion Mitchell (5)	Golden 1 Center; 14,250	2–0
3	October 12	@ Phoenix	W 105–104	De'Aaron Fox (15)	Domantas Sabonis (10)	Domantas Sabonis (5)	Footprint Center; 16,085	3–0
4	October 14	L.A. Lakers	W 133–86	De'Aaron Fox (21)	Domantas Sabonis (12)	Domantas Sabonis (9)	Golden 1 Center; 17,611	4–0

2022–23 season schedule

=== Regular season ===
2022–23 game log
Total: 48–34 (home: 23–18; road: 25–16)
October: 2–4 (home: 1–3; road: 1–1)

Game	Date	Team	Score	High points	High rebounds	High assists	Location Attendance	Record
1	October 19	Portland	L 108–115	De'Aaron Fox (33)	Harrison Barnes (8)	De'Aaron Fox (7)	Golden 1 Center; 17,611	0–1
2	October 22	L.A. Clippers	L 109–111	De'Aaron Fox (36)	Domantas Sabonis (10)	Domantas Sabonis (7)	Golden 1 Center; 16,296	0–2
3	October 23	@ Golden State	L 125–130	De'Aaron Fox (26)	Domantas Sabonis (14)	De'Aaron Fox (10)	Chase Center; 18,064	0–3
4	October 27	Memphis	L 110–125	De'Aaron Fox (27)	Domantas Sabonis (11)	Domantas Sabonis (9)	Golden 1 Center; 15,511	0–4
5	October 29	Miami	W 119–113	Kevin Huerter (27)	De'Aaron Fox (13)	Kevin Huerter (7)	Golden 1 Center; 14,618	1–4
6	October 31	@ Charlotte	W 115–108	Kevin Huerter (26)	Domantas Sabonis (16)	Domantas Sabonis (7)	Spectrum Center; 12,020	2–4

November : 9–5 (home: 6–1; road: 3–4)

Game	Date	Team	Score	High points	High rebounds	High assists	Location Attendance	Record
7	November 2	@ Miami	L 107–110	Huerter, Sabonis (22)	Domantas Sabonis (12)	Domantas Sabonis (8)	FTX Arena; 19,600	2–5
8	November 5	@ Orlando	W 126–123 (OT)	De'Aaron Fox (37)	Domantas Sabonis (11)	Domantas Sabonis (6)	Amway Center; 18,846	3–5
9	November 7	@ Golden State	L 113–116	De'Aaron Fox (28)	Domantas Sabonis (14)	Fox, Sabonis (6)	Chase Center; 18,064	3–6
10	November 9	Cleveland	W 127–120	Domantas Sabonis (21)	Harrison Barnes (9)	De'Aaron Fox (8)	Golden 1 Center; 13,816	4–6
11	November 11	@ L.A. Lakers	W 120–114	De'Aaron Fox (32)	Domantas Sabonis (10)	De'Aaron Fox (12)	Crypto.com Arena; 17,849	5–6
12	November 7	Golden State	W 122–115	Domantas Sabonis (26)	Domantas Sabonis (22)	Fox, Sabonis (8)	Golden 1 Center; 16,410	6–6
13	November 15	Brooklyn	W 153–121	Terence Davis (31)	Terence Davis (9)	De'Aaron Fox (9)	Golden 1 Center; 17,611	7–6
14	November 17	San Antonio	W 130–112	De'Aaron Fox (28)	Barnes, Sabonis (8)	De'Aaron Fox (8)	Golden 1 Center; 16,522	8–6
15	November 20	Detroit	W 137–129	De'Aaron Fox (33)	Domantas Sabonis (13)	Fox, Sabonis (7)	Golden 1 Center; 17,866	9–6
16	November 22	@ Memphis	W 113–109	De'Aaron Fox (32)	Domantas Sabonis (13)	Domantas Sabonis (8)	FedExForum; 16,826	10–6
17	November 23	@ Atlanta	L 106–115	Malik Monk (27)	Domantas Sabonis (13)	Domantas Sabonis (7)	State Farm Arena; 18,173	10–7
18	November 25	@ Boston	L 104–122	De'Aaron Fox (20)	Murray, Sabonis (10)	Domantas Sabonis (6)	TD Garden; 19,156	10–8
19	November 28	Phoenix	L 117–122	Malik Monk (30)	Domantas Sabonis (9)	Domantas Sabonis (10)	Golden 1 Center; 16,407	10–9
20	November 30	Indiana	W 137–114	Harrison Barnes (22)	Domantas Sabonis (10)	Domantas Sabonis (7)	Golden 1 Center; 17,611	11–9

December: 8–6 (home: 4–3; road: 4–3)

Game	Date	Team	Score	High points	High rebounds	High assists	Location Attendance	Record
21	December 3	@ L.A. Clippers	W 123–96	Domantas Sabonis (24)	Chimezie Metu (8)	Domantas Sabonis (6)	Crypto.com Arena; 16,587	12–9
22	December 4	Chicago	W 110–101	Malik Monk (20)	Domantas Sabonis (17)	Domantas Sabonis (10)	Golden 1 Center; 17,611	13–9
23	December 7	@ Milwaukee	L 113–126	Domantas Sabonis (23)	Domantas Sabonis (12)	Domantas Sabonis (7)	Fiserv Forum; 17,341	13–10
24	December 9	@ Cleveland	W 106–95	Harrison Barnes (20)	Domantas Sabonis (18)	Mitchell, Sabonis (6)	Rocket Mortgage FieldHouse; 19,432	14–10
25	December 11	@ New York	L 99–112	Domantas Sabonis (20)	Domantas Sabonis (12)	Kevin Huerter (6)	Madison Square Garden; 19,812	14–11
26	December 13	@ Philadelphia	L 103–123	Domantas Sabonis (22)	Domantas Sabonis (10)	Domantas Sabonis (5)	Wells Fargo Center; 19,768	14–12
27	December 14	@ Toronto	W 124–123	De'Aaron Fox (27)	Domantas Sabonis (20)	De'Aaron Fox (10)	Scotiabank Arena; 19,800	15–12
28	December 16	@ Detroit	W 122–113	De'Aaron Fox (24)	Domantas Sabonis (13)	De'Aaron Fox (9)	Little Caesars Arena; 17,892	16–12
29	December 19	Charlotte	L 119–125	De'Aaron Fox (37)	Domantas Sabonis (23)	Domantas Sabonis (7)	Golden 1 Center; 17,803	16–13
30	December 21	L.A. Lakers	W 134–120	Kevin Huerter (26)	Domantas Sabonis (21)	Domantas Sabonis (12)	Golden 1 Center; 17,611	17–13
31	December 23	Washington	L 111–125	De'Aaron Fox (26)	Domantas Sabonis (15)	Domantas Sabonis (10)	Golden 1 Center; 17,894	17–14
32	December 27	Denver	L 106–113	De'Aaron Fox (26)	Trey Lyles (10)	Davion Mitchell (9)	Golden 1 Center; 17,937	17–15
33	December 28	Denver	W 127–126	Malik Monk (33)	Domantas Sabonis (10)	De'Aaron Fox (13)	Golden 1 Center; 17,985	18–15
34	December 30	Utah	W 126–125	Kevin Huerter (30)	Domantas Sabonis (11)	De'Aaron Fox (10)	Golden 1 Center; 17,946	19–15

January : 9–6 (home: 5–4; road: 4–2)

Game	Date	Team	Score	High points	High rebounds	High assists	Location Attendance	Record
35	January 1	@ Memphis	L 108–118	De'Aaron Fox (19)	Domantas Sabonis (14)	De'Aaron Fox (6)	FedEx Forum; 17,794	19–16
36	January 3	@ Utah	W 117–115	De'Aaron Fox (37)	Domantas Sabonis (14)	Domantas Sabonis (8)	Vivint Arena; 18,206	20–16
37	January 4	Atlanta	L 117–120	De'Aaron Fox (25)	Domantas Sabonis (14)	Domantas Sabonis (8)	Golden 1 Center; 17,611	20–17
38	January 7	L.A. Lakers	L 134–136	De'Aaron Fox (34)	Domantas Sabonis (12)	De'Aaron Fox (9)	Golden 1 Center; 17,611	20–18
39	January 9	Orlando	W 136–111	Harrison Barnes (30)	Domantas Sabonis (10)	De'Aaron Fox (9)	Golden 1 Center; 16,499	21–18
40	January 11	Houston	W 135–115	Domantas Sabonis (25)	Domantas Sabonis (14)	Fox, Sabonis (9)	Golden 1 Center; 16,057	22–18
41	January 13	Houston	W 139–114	Harrison Barnes (27)	Domantas Sabonis (15)	Domantas Sabonis (16)	Golden 1 Center; 17,894	23–18
42	January 15	@ San Antonio	W 132–119	Harrison Barnes (29)	Domantas Sabonis (18)	Domantas Sabonis (8)	AT&T Center; 12,339	24–18
43	January 18	@ L.A. Lakers	W 116–111	De'Aaron Fox (31)	Richaun Holmes (11)	Kevin Huerter (8)	Crypto.com Arena; 18,142	25–18
44	January 20	Oklahoma City	W 118–113	Keegan Murray (29)	Murray, Sabonis (14)	Domantas Sabonis (14)	Golden 1 Center; 17,932	26–18
45	January 21	Philadelphia	L 127–129	De'Aaron Fox (31)	Domantas Sabonis (9)	Domantas Sabonis (10)	Golden 1 Center; 17,861	26–19
46	January 23	Memphis	W 133–100	Trey Lyles (24)	Domantas Sabonis (10)	Domantas Sabonis (11)	Golden 1 Center; 17,821	27–19
47	January 25	Toronto	L 95–113	Kevin Huerter (21)	Domantas Sabonis (8)	De'Aaron Fox (8)	Golden 1 Center; 17,767	27–20
48	January 28	@ Minnesota	L 110–117	De'Aaron Fox (29)	Domantas Sabonis (10)	De'Aaron Fox (6)	Target Center; 17,136	27–21
49	January 30	@ Minnesota	W 118–111 (OT)	De'Aaron Fox (32)	Murray, Sabonis (13)	Malik Monk (5)	Target Center; 15,342	28–21

February : 8–4 (home: 2–1; road: 6–3)

Game	Date	Team	Score	High points	High rebounds	High assists	Location Attendance	Record
50	February 1	@ San Antonio	W 119–109	Domantas Sabonis (34)	Domantas Sabonis (11)	De'Aaron Fox (10)	AT&T Center; 13,207	29–21
51	February 3	@ Indiana	L 104–107	Harrison Barnes (23)	Domantas Sabonis (16)	Domantas Sabonis (6)	Gainbridge Fieldhouse; 17,274	29–22
52	February 5	@ New Orleans	L 104–136	Malik Monk (16)	Domantas Sabonis (11)	Matthew Dellavedova (6)	Smoothie King Center; 17,779	29–23
53	February 6	@ Houston	W 140–120	Keegan Murray (30)	Domantas Sabonis (7)	Domantas Sabonis (10)	Toyota Center; 15,405	30–23
54	February 8	@ Houston	W 130–128	De'Aaron Fox (31)	Domantas Sabonis (9)	De'Aaron Fox (11)	Toyota Center; 15,881	31–23
55	February 10	Dallas	L 114–122	De'Aaron Fox (33)	Domantas Sabonis (11)	Domantas Sabonis (7)	Golden 1 Center; 18,111	31–24
56	February 11	Dallas	W 133–128 (OT)	De'Aaron Fox (36)	Domantas Sabonis (14)	Fox, Huerter (5)	Golden 1 Center; 18,111	32–24
57	February 14	@ Phoenix	L 109–120	De'Aaron Fox (35)	Domantas Sabonis (15)	Domantas Sabonis (7)	Footprint Center; 17,071	32–25
58	February 23	Portland	W 133–116	De'Aaron Fox (31)	Domantas Sabonis (17)	Domantas Sabonis (10)	Golden 1 Center; 18,041	33–25
59	February 24	@ L.A. Clippers	W 176–175 (2OT)	Malik Monk (45)	Domantas Sabonis (10)	De'Aaron Fox (12)	Crypto.com Arena; 19,068	34–25
60	February 26	@ Oklahoma City	W 124–115	De'Aaron Fox (33)	Domantas Sabonis (15)	Sabonis, Fox (8)	Paycom Center; 15,147	35–25
61	February 28	@ Oklahoma City	W 123–117	Harrison Barnes (29)	Domantas Sabonis (13)	Sabonis, Huerter (9)	Paycom Center; 13,353	36–25

March : 11–5 (home: 5–4; road: 6–1)

Game	Date	Team	Score	High points	High rebounds	High assists	Location Attendance	Record
62	March 3	L.A. Clippers	W 128–127	De'Aaron Fox (33)	Domantas Sabonis (10)	Malik Monk (8)	Golden 1 Center; 18,111	37–25
63	March 4	Minnesota	L 134–138	Kevin Huerter (29)	Domantas Sabonis (14)	De'Aaron Fox (7)	Golden 1 Center; 18,111	37–26
64	March 6	New Orleans	W 123–108	Kevin Huerter (25)	Domantas Sabonis (11)	Domantas Sabonis (11)	Golden 1 Center; 17,708	38–26
65	March 9	New York	W 122–117	Domantas Sabonis (24)	Domantas Sabonis (13)	Domantas Sabonis (10)	Golden 1 Center; 18,068	39–26
66	March 11	@ Phoenix	W 128–119	Harrison Barnes (19)	Domantas Sabonis (8)	De'Aaron Fox (6)	Footprint Center; 17,071	40–26
67	March 13	Milwaukee	L 124–133	De'Aaron Fox (35)	Domantas Sabonis (17)	Domantas Sabonis (15)	Golden 1 Center; 18,111	40–27
68	March 15	@ Chicago	W 117–114	De'Aaron Fox (32)	Domantas Sabonis (17)	Domantas Sabonis (10)	United Center; 21,886	41–27
69	March 16	@ Brooklyn	W 101–96	Domantas Sabonis (24)	Domantas Sabonis (21)	Malik Monk (6)	Barclays Center; 18,172	42–27
70	March 18	@ Washington	W 132–118	Domantas Sabonis (30)	Domantas Sabonis (9)	Domantas Sabonis (10)	Capital One Arena; 18,529	43–27
71	March 20	@ Utah	L 120–128	De'Aaron Fox (37)	Domantas Sabonis (12)	Domantas Sabonis (9)	Vivint Arena; 18,206	43–28
72	March 21	Boston	L 106–132	De'Aaron Fox (18)	Domantas Sabonis (13)	Domantas Sabonis (12)	Golden 1 Center; 18,111	43–29
73	March 24	Phoenix	W 135–127	Kevin Huerter (29)	Huerter, Sabonis (9)	Domantas Sabonis (9)	Golden 1 Center; 18,151	44–29
74	March 25	Utah	W 121–113	Kevin Huerter (27)	Domantas Sabonis (15)	Domantas Sabonis (7)	Golden 1 Center; 18,151	45–29
75	March 27	Minnesota	L 115–119	De'Aaron Fox (29)	Trey Lyles (11)	De'Aaron Fox (6)	Golden 1 Center; 18,151	45–30
76	March 29	@ Portland	W 120–80	Malik Monk (19)	Domantas Sabonis (12)	Fox, Monk (6)	Moda Center; 18,550	46–30
77	March 31	@ Portland	W 138–114	Fox, Monk, Murray, Sabonis (20)	Domantas Sabonis (12)	De'Aaron Fox (11)	Moda Center; 18,389	47–30

April : 1–4 (home: 0–2; road: 1–2)

Game	Date	Team	Score	High points	High rebounds	High assists	Location Attendance	Record
78	April 2	San Antonio	L 134–142 (OT)	De'Aaron Fox (28)	Domantas Sabonis (8)	Domantas Sabonis (6)	Golden 1 Center; 18,183	47–31
79	April 4	@ New Orleans	W 121–103	De'Aaron Fox (23)	Domantas Sabonis (12)	Domantas Sabonis (11)	Smoothie King Center; 15,799	48–31
80	April 5	@ Dallas	L 119–123	De'Aaron Fox (28)	Domantas Sabonis (11)	Domantas Sabonis (11)	American Airlines Center; 20,271	48–32
81	April 7	Golden State	L 97–119	Lyles, Metu (15)	Chimezie Metu (9)	Davion Mitchell (5)	Golden 1 Center; 18,253	48–33
82	April 9	@ Denver	L 95–109	Harrison Barnes (17)	Domantas Sabonis (9)	PJ Dozier (6)	Ball Arena; 19,652	48–34

2022–23 season schedule

=== Playoffs ===
2023 playoff game log
Total: 3–4 (home: 2–2; road: 1–2)
First Round: 3–4 (home: 2–2; road: 1–2)

Game	Date	Team	Score	High points	High rebounds	High assists	Location Attendance	Series
1	April 15	Golden State	W 126–123	De'Aaron Fox (38)	Domantas Sabonis (16)	De'Aaron Fox (5)	Golden 1 Center; 18,253	1–0
2	April 17	Golden State	W 114–106	Fox, Sabonis (24)	Domantas Sabonis (9)	De'Aaron Fox (9)	Golden 1 Center; 18,253	2–0
3	April 20	@ Golden State	L 97–114	De'Aaron Fox (26)	Domantas Sabonis (16)	De'Aaron Fox (9)	Chase Center; 18,064	2–1
4	April 23	@ Golden State	L 125–126	De'Aaron Fox (38)	De'Aaron Fox (9)	Domantas Sabonis (8)	Chase Center; 18,064	2–2
5	April 26	Golden State	L 116–123	De'Aaron Fox (24)	Domantas Sabonis (10)	De'Aaron Fox (9)	Golden 1 Center; 18,253	2–3
6	April 28	@ Golden State	W 118–99	Malik Monk (28)	Keegan Murray (12)	De'Aaron Fox (11)	Chase Center; 18,064	3–3
7	April 30	Golden State	L 100–120	Domantas Sabonis (22)	Monk, Huerter (9)	Domantas Sabonis (7)	Golden 1 Center; 18,253	3–4

2023 playoff schedule

== Player statistics ==
Legend
GP	Games played	GS	Games started	MPG	Minutes per game
FG%	Field-goal percentage	3P%	3-point field-goal percentage	FT%	Free-throw percentage
RPG	Rebounds per game	APG	Assists per game	SPG	Steals per game
BPG	Blocks per game	PPG	Points per game

=== Regular season ===
Player	GP	GS	MPG	FG%	3P%	FT%	RPG	APG	SPG	BPG	PPG
Harrison Barnes	82	82	32.5	.473	.374	.847	4.5	1.6	.7	.1	15.0
Keegan Murray	80	78	29.8	.453	.411	.765	4.6	1.2	.8	.5	12.2
Davion Mitchell	80	9	18.1	.454	.320	.806	1.3	2.3	.6	.2	5.6
Domantas Sabonis	79	79	34.6	.615	.373	.742	12.3	7.3	.8	.5	19.1
Malik Monk	77	0	22.3	.448	.359	.889	2.6	3.9	.6	.3	13.5
Kevin Huerter	75	75	29.4	.485	.402	.725	3.3	2.9	1.1	.3	15.2
Trey Lyles	74	0	16.9	.458	.363	.815	4.1	.9	.4	.4	7.6
De'Aaron Fox	73	73	33.4	.512	.324	.780	4.2	6.1	1.1	.3	25.0
Chimezie Metu	66	0	10.4	.589	.237	.740	3.0	.6	.3	.3	4.9
Terence Davis	64	5	13.1	.423	.366	.791	2.2	1.0	.7	.2	6.7
Richaun Holmes	42	1	8.3	.618	.625	.789	1.9	.2	.1	.3	3.1
KZ Okpala	35	3	7.1	.421	.333	.875	1.0	.4	.2	.2	1.3
Matthew Dellavedova	32	0	6.7	.340	.333	.571	.4	1.3	.2	.0	1.5
Alex Len	26	2	6.2	.533	.000	.688	2.3	.5	.2	.4	1.7
Kessler Edwards^{†}	22	3	13.9	.435	.349	.769	2.1	1.0	.5	.2	3.9
PJ Dozier	16	0	4.9	.303	.125		.9	.6	.4	.1	1.4
Keon Ellis	16	0	4.4	.438	.500	.571	.5	.4	.3	.1	1.5
Neemias Queta	5	0	5.8	.667		.000	2.2	.2	.0	.4	2.4
Chima Moneke	2	0	4.0	.500		.000	1.0	.5	.0	.0	1.0
Deonte Burton	2	0	3.0	.000	.000		.0	.0	.0	.0	.0

=== Playoffs ===
Player	GP	GS	MPG	FG%	3P%	FT%	RPG	APG	SPG	BPG	PPG
De'Aaron Fox	7	7	38.6	.424	.333	.756	5.4	7.7	2.1	.6	27.4
Domantas Sabonis	7	7	34.7	.495	.200	.571	11.0	4.7	1.4	.9	16.4
Harrison Barnes	7	7	28.0	.417	.240	.731	3.4	.7	1.1	.3	10.7
Keegan Murray	7	7	27.7	.448	.375	.667	6.3	.7	.6	.3	9.7
Kevin Huerter	7	7	26.1	.347	.205	.750	4.4	1.1	.4	1.3	9.1
Malik Monk	7	0	29.3	.409	.333	.898	5.4	3.6	.7	.4	19.0
Davion Mitchell	7	0	20.0	.413	.259	.833	1.3	1.7	.9	.1	7.1
Trey Lyles	7	0	16.9	.425	.333	.600	5.7	.7	.3	.0	6.6
Alex Len	7	0	7.7	.778		.833	2.9	.1	.0	.4	2.7
Kessler Edwards	6	0	1.2				.2	.0	.0	.0	.0
Terence Davis	4	0	14.5	.400	.353	1.000	2.3	1.5	.3	.0	6.0
PJ Dozier	3	0	2.0	.500	.500		.7	.0	.0	.0	2.7
Chimezie Metu	3	0	2.0	.000		.667	.3	.0	.0	.0	.7

- ^{†} Denotes player spent time with another team in the season. Stats reflect time with the Kings only.

== Transactions ==
=== Trades ===
June 23, 2022	To Sacramento Kings Draft rights to Sasha Vezenkov (2017 No. 57); Cash considerations	To Cleveland Cavaliers 2022 No. 49 pick
June 23, 2022	To Sacramento Kings 2024 DAL second-round pick 2028 DAL second-round pick	To Dallas Mavericks Draft rights to Jaden Hardy (No. 37)
July 6, 2022	To Sacramento Kings Kevin Huerter	To Atlanta Hawks Maurice Harkless; Justin Holiday; 2024 SAC protected first-round pick
February 7, 2023	To Sacramento Kings Kessler Edwards; Cash considerations	To Brooklyn Nets *Draft rights to David Michineau (2016 No. 39)

=== Free agency ===
==== Re-signed ====
Player	Signed	Ref.
Neemias Queta	Two-way contract	

==== Additions ====
Player	Signed	Former team	Ref.
Keon Ellis	Two-way contract	Alabama	
Malik Monk	2 year, $19 million deal	Los Angeles Lakers	

==== Subtractions ====
Player	Reason left	New team	Ref.
Damian Jones	Free agent	Los Angeles Lakers	
Donte DiVincenzo	Free agent	Golden State Warriors	

== See also ==
- Light the Beam
