= 2022–23 Los Angeles Lakers season =

American professional basketball season

- Head coach: Darvin Ham
- President: Jeanie Buss
- General manager: Rob Pelinka
- Owners: Jerry Buss family trust (majority); Jeanie Buss (controlling owner); Mark Walter, Todd Boehly, Edward P. Roski, and Patrick Soon-Shiong (minority)
- Arena: Crypto.com Arena (Capacity: 18,997)

Results
- Record: 43–39 (.524)
- Place: Division: 5th (Pacific); Conference: 7th (Western)
- Playoff finish: Conference finals (lost to Nuggets 0–4)
- Stats at Basketball Reference

Local media
- Television: Spectrum SportsNet
- Radio: ESPN LA 710 (English); 1020 Radio AM (Spanish)

The 2022–23 Los Angeles Lakers season was the 76th season of the franchise, its 75th season in the National Basketball Association (NBA), its 63rd season in Los Angeles, and its 24th season playing home games at Crypto.com Arena. On April 11, 2022, the Los Angeles Lakers fired Frank Vogel as head coach. On June 3, 2022, the Lakers hired Darvin Ham as their new head coach.

The Lakers began the season 0–5 and were the last winless team in the league. It was the first time that LeBron James started a season 0–5 since his rookie season with the Cleveland Cavaliers in 2003. The Lakers earned their first win in the following game against the Denver Nuggets, after Anthony Davis returned from a one-game absence due to lower back tightness. He scored 23 points and had 15 rebounds, and James added 26 points. In his second game off the bench as the Lakers' sixth man, Russell Westbrook had 18 points, eight rebounds, and eight assists. After winning their next game against the New Orleans Pelicans, the Lakers lost 130–116 to the Utah Jazz, failing to secure their first three-game winning streak since January 7, 2022.

On November 18, 2022, the Lakers won their second straight game for the second time this season and they also won their third straight game for the first time since January 2022. The Lakers retired No. 99 in honor of George Mikan on October 30, 2022. Pau Gasol's No. 16 was retired on March 7, 2023, against his former team the Memphis Grizzlies. On February 7, 2023, James broke the NBA scoring record against the Oklahoma City Thunder.

The Lakers overhauled their roster after a series of trades before and during the trade deadline. On January 23, the Lakers acquired power forward Rui Hachimura in a move that sent Kendrick Nunn to the Washington Wizards. Two weeks later, during the deadline, the Lakers would move on from Westbrook, trading him to the Utah Jazz (though he would later sign with the Lakers' cross-town rivals, the Clippers, following a contract buyout with the Jazz), and acquiring D'Angelo Russell, Malik Beasley, and Jarred Vanderbilt.

With a 128–117 win over the Jazz, the Lakers qualified for the Play-In-Tournament for the first time since 2021. The Lakers defeated the Minnesota Timberwolves 108–102 in overtime to return to the playoffs after a one-year absence. Additionally, the Lakers became the sixth team to advance to the playoffs after starting the season 2–10. The Lakers won 8 of their last 10 games. In the 2023 NBA playoffs, the Lakers defeated the two-seeded Memphis Grizzlies in six games despite being underdogs to win a playoff series for the first time since their championship run in 2020 and on their home court for the first time since 2012. In the conference semifinals, they defeated the defending champion Golden State Warriors also in six games, becoming the first 7th-seed to reach the Western Conference finals since the 1986–87 Seattle SuperSonics.

The Lakers were swept by the eventual NBA champion Denver Nuggets in the Western Conference finals in 4 straight games. This was the first time that the Nuggets have won a playoff series over Los Angeles in their franchise history. Beforehand, the Lakers had won 7 straight playoff matchups against Denver dating back from 1979 to 2020. It was also the first time that the Lakers were swept in a playoff round since the San Antonio Spurs did it in the first round of the 2013 NBA playoffs, and the first time that they were swept by a top seeded team since the Utah Jazz did it in the 1997–98 NBA season. This also marked the first time for James of experiencing a defeat in the conference finals since 2009, when he also was then part of the Cleveland Cavaliers team, who were under his leadership that he also led and lost to the Dwight Howard-led Orlando Magic in a six-game series.

== Draft ==
The Lakers did not hold any pick in the 2022 NBA draft, because they have traded their original selections to the New Orleans Pelicans (as part of the 2019 Anthony Davis trade) and the Washington Wizards; the latter was a second-round pick that was eventually used by the San Antonio Spurs in the draft. However, they got the 35th pick, Max Christie, in a trade with the Orlando Magic in exchange for a 2028 second-round pick and cash considerations.

== Standings ==
=== Division ===
Pacific Division	W	L	PCT	GB	Home	Road	Div	GP
y – Sacramento Kings	48	34	.585	–	23‍–‍18	25‍–‍16	9–7	82
x – Phoenix Suns	45	37	.549	3.0	28‍–‍13	17‍–‍24	9–7	82
x – Los Angeles Clippers	44	38	.537	4.0	23‍–‍18	21‍–‍20	9–7	82
x – Golden State Warriors	44	38	.537	4.0	33‍–‍8	11‍–‍30	7–9	82
x – Los Angeles Lakers	43	39	.524	5.0	23‍–‍18	20‍–‍21	6–10	82

=== Conference ===
Western Conference
#	Team	W	L	PCT	GB	GP
1	c – Denver Nuggets *	53	29	.646	–	82
2	y – Memphis Grizzlies *	51	31	.622	2.0	82
3	y – Sacramento Kings *	48	34	.585	5.0	82
4	x – Phoenix Suns	45	37	.549	8.0	82
5	x – Los Angeles Clippers	44	38	.537	9.0	82
6	x – Golden State Warriors	44	38	.537	9.0	82
7	x – Los Angeles Lakers	43	39	.524	10.0	82
8	x – Minnesota Timberwolves	42	40	.512	11.0	82
9	pi – New Orleans Pelicans	42	40	.512	11.0	82
10	pi – Oklahoma City Thunder	40	42	.488	13.0	82
11	Dallas Mavericks	38	44	.463	15.0	82
12	Utah Jazz	37	45	.451	16.0	82
13	Portland Trail Blazers	33	49	.402	20.0	82
14	Houston Rockets	22	60	.268	31.0	82
15	San Antonio Spurs	22	60	.268	31.0	82

== Roster ==
2022–23 Los Angeles Lakers roster
Players

Pos.	No.	Player	Height	Weight	DOB	From
C	12	Mo Bamba	7 ft 0 in (2.13 m)	231 lb (105 kg)	1998-05-12	Texas
G	5	Malik Beasley	6 ft 4 in (1.93 m)	187 lb (85 kg)	1996-11-26	Florida State
G/F	7	Troy Brown Jr.	6 ft 7 in (2.01 m)	215 lb (98 kg)	1999-07-28	Oregon
G/F	10	Max Christie	6 ft 5 in (1.96 m)	190 lb (86 kg)	2003-02-10	Michigan State
F/C	3	Anthony Davis	6 ft 10 in (2.08 m)	253 lb (115 kg)	1993-03-11	Kentucky
F/C	35	Wenyen Gabriel	6 ft 9 in (2.06 m)	205 lb (93 kg)	1997-03-26	Kentucky
F	28	Rui Hachimura	6 ft 8 in (2.03 m)	230 lb (104 kg)	1998-02-08	Gonzaga
G	0	Shaquille Harrison	6 ft 4 in (1.93 m)	180 lb (82 kg)	1993-10-06	Tulsa
F	6	LeBron James	6 ft 9 in (2.06 m)	250 lb (113 kg)	1984-12-30	St. Vincent-St. Mary HS (OH)
G	14	Scotty Jr. Pippen (TW)	6 ft 1 in (1.85 m)	170 lb (77 kg)	2000-11-10	Vanderbilt
G	15	Austin Reaves	6 ft 5 in (1.96 m)	207 lb (94 kg)	1998-05-29	Oklahoma
G	1	D'Angelo Russell	6 ft 3 in (1.91 m)	193 lb (88 kg)	1996-02-23	Ohio State
G	17	Dennis Schröder	6 ft 1 in (1.85 m)	172 lb (78 kg)	1993-09-15	Germany
F	20	Cole Swider (TW)	6 ft 9 in (2.06 m)	220 lb (100 kg)	1999-05-08	Syracuse
F/C	9	Tristan Thompson	6 ft 9 in (2.06 m)	254 lb (115 kg)	1991-03-13	Texas
F	2	Jarred Vanderbilt	6 ft 8 in (2.03 m)	214 lb (97 kg)	1999-04-03	Kentucky
G/F	4	Lonnie IV Walker	6 ft 4 in (1.93 m)	204 lb (93 kg)	1998-12-14	Miami (FL)

Coaches
Head coach
- Darvin Ham
Assistant(s)
- Dru Anthrop
- J. D. DuBois
- Phil Handy
- Chris Jent
- Jordan Ott
- Jon Pastorek
- Zach Peterson
- Schuyler Rimmer

Legend
- (DP) Unsigned draft pick
- (FA) Free agent
- (S) Suspended
- (GL) On assignment to G League affiliate
- (TW) Two-way affiliate player
- (L) On leave from the team
- Injured

Roster
Updated: April 9, 2023

== Game log ==
=== Preseason ===
2022 preseason game log
Total: 1–5 (home: 0–3; road: 1–2)
Preseason: 1–5 (home: 0–3; road: 1–2)

Game	Date	Team	Score	High points	High rebounds	High assists	Location Attendance	Record
1	October 3	Sacramento	L 75–105	Anthony Davis (11)	Anthony Davis (11)	Westbrook, Christie (3)	Crypto.com Arena; 17,919	0–1
2	October 5	Phoenix	L 115–119	LeBron James (23)	Austin Reaves (7)	Austin Reaves (9)	T-Mobile Arena; 8,908	0–2
3	October 6	@ Minnesota	L 99–114	Thomas Bryant (18)	Austin Reaves (8)	Scotty Pippen Jr. (7)	T-Mobile Arena; 7,311	0–3
4	October 9	@ Golden State	W 124–121	Anthony Davis (28)	Cole Swider (6)	Kendrick Nunn (7)	Chase Center; 18,064	1–3
5	October 12	Minnesota	L 113–118	LeBron James (25)	Anthony Davis (13)	Beverley, Reaves (5)	Crypto.com Arena; 18,754	1–4
6	October 14	@ Sacramento	L 86–133	James, Reaves (10)	LeBron James (5)	Reaves, Pippen Jr. (3)	Golden 1 Center; 17,611	1–5

2022–23 season schedule

=== Regular season ===
2022–23 game log
Total: 43–39 (home: 23–18; road: 20–21)
October: 1–5 (home: 1–2; road: 0–3)

Game	Date	Team	Score	High points	High rebounds	High assists	Location Attendance	Record
1	October 18	@ Golden State	L 109–123	LeBron James (31)	LeBron James (14)	LeBron James (8)	Chase Center; 18,064	0–1
2	October 20	L.A. Clippers	L 97–103	Lonnie Walker IV (26)	LeBron James (10)	LeBron James (6)	Crypto.com Arena (LAL); 18,997	0–2
3	October 23	Portland	L 102–104	LeBron James (31)	Anthony Davis (10)	LeBron James (8)	Crypto.com Arena; 18,997	0–3
4	October 26	@ Denver	L 99–110	Anthony Davis (22)	Anthony Davis (14)	LeBron James (9)	Ball Arena; 19,520	0–4
5	October 28	@ Minnesota	L 102–111	LeBron James (28)	Brown Jr., Jones, Westbrook (8)	LeBron James (5)	Target Center; 17,136	0–5
6	October 30	Denver	W 121–110	LeBron James (26)	Anthony Davis (15)	James, Westbrook (8)	Crypto.com Arena; 18,997	1–5

November: 7–7 (home: 5–4; road: 2–3)

Game	Date	Team	Score	High points	High rebounds	High assists	Location Attendance	Record
7	November 2	New Orleans	W 120–117 (OT)	Lonnie Walker IV (28)	Anthony Davis (15)	Russell Westbrook (9)	Crypto.com Arena; 18,997	2–5
8	November 4	Utah	L 116–130	Russell Westbrook (26)	LeBron James (10)	LeBron James (8)	Crypto.com Arena; 18,997	2–6
9	November 6	Cleveland	L 100–114	LeBron James (27)	Anthony Davis (12)	Russell Westbrook (12)	Crypto.com Arena; 18,997	2–7
10	November 7	@ Utah	L 116–139	Anthony Davis (29)	Damian Jones (7)	Russell Westbrook (5)	Vivint Arena; 18,206	2–8
11	November 9	@ L.A. Clippers	L 101–114	LeBron James (30)	James, Reaves (9)	Russell Westbrook (9)	Crypto.com Arena (LAC); 19,068	2–9
12	November 11	Sacramento	L 114–120	Anthony Davis (24)	Anthony Davis (14)	Russell Westbrook (11)	Crypto.com Arena; 17,849	2–10
13	November 13	Brooklyn	W 116–103	Anthony Davis (37)	Anthony Davis (18)	Russell Westbrook (12)	Crypto.com Arena; 18,040	3–10
14	November 18	Detroit	W 128–121	Anthony Davis (38)	Anthony Davis (16)	Russell Westbrook (12)	Crypto.com Arena; 18,095	4–10
15	November 20	San Antonio	W 123–92	Anthony Davis (30)	Anthony Davis (18)	Russell Westbrook (10)	Crypto.com Arena; 18,211	5–10
16	November 22	@ Phoenix	L 105–115	Anthony Davis (37)	Anthony Davis (21)	Russell Westbrook (5)	Footprint Center; 17,071	5–11
17	November 25	@ San Antonio	W 105–94	Anthony Davis (25)	Anthony Davis (15)	Russell Westbrook (7)	AT&T Center; 18,354	6–11
18	November 26	@ San Antonio	W 143–138	LeBron James (39)	LeBron James (11)	Schröder, Westbrook (6)	AT&T Center; 18,354	7–11
19	November 28	Indiana	L 115–116	Anthony Davis (25)	Anthony Davis (13)	Davis, Westbrook (6)	Crypto.com Arena; 16,034	7–12
20	November 30	Portland	W 128–109	LeBron James (31)	Anthony Davis (12)	LeBron James (8)	Crypto.com Arena; 18,560	8–12

December: 7–9 (home: 2–2; road: 5–7)

Game	Date	Team	Score	High points	High rebounds	High assists	Location Attendance	Record
21	December 2	@ Milwaukee	W 133–129	Anthony Davis (44)	Anthony Davis (10)	James, Westbrook (11)	Fiserv Forum; 17,938	9–12
22	December 4	@ Washington	W 130–119	Anthony Davis (55)	Anthony Davis (17)	Russell Westbrook (15)	Capital One Arena; 19,647	10–12
23	December 6	@ Cleveland	L 102–116	LeBron James (21)	LeBron James (17)	LeBron James (4)	Rocket Mortgage FieldHouse; 19,432	10–13
24	December 7	@ Toronto	L 113–126	Dennis Schröder (18)	Damian Jones (10)	Russell Westbrook (4)	Scotiabank Arena; 19,800	10–14
25	December 9	@ Philadelphia	L 122–133 (OT)	Anthony Davis (31)	Anthony Davis (12)	Russell Westbrook (11)	Wells Fargo Center; 20,852	10–15
26	December 11	@ Detroit	W 124–117	LeBron James (35)	Anthony Davis (15)	Russell Westbrook (9)	Little Caesars Arena; 20,190	11–15
27	December 13	Boston	L 118–122 (OT)	Anthony Davis (37)	Russell Westbrook (14)	LeBron James (9)	Crypto.com Arena; 18,661	11–16
28	December 16	Denver	W 126–108	LeBron James (30)	Russell Westbrook (11)	Russell Westbrook (12)	Crypto.com Arena; 18,505	12–16
29	December 18	Washington	W 119–117	LeBron James (33)	Thomas Bryant (10)	LeBron James (9)	Crypto.com Arena; 18,153	13–16
30	December 19	@ Phoenix	L 104–130	Dennis Schröder (30)	Damian Jones (7)	Dennis Schröder (4)	Footprint Center; 17,071	13–17
31	December 21	@ Sacramento	L 120–134	LeBron James (31)	Thomas Bryant (10)	LeBron James (11)	Golden 1 Center; 17,611	13–18
32	December 23	Charlotte	L 130–134	LeBron James (34)	Thomas Bryant (13)	LeBron James (8)	Crypto.com Arena; 18,997	13–19
33	December 25	@ Dallas	L 115–124	LeBron James (38)	Wenyen Gabriel (7)	LeBron James (5)	American Airlines Center; 20,441	13–20
34	December 27	@ Orlando	W 129–110	LeBron James (28)	Russell Westbrook (13)	Russell Westbrook (13)	Amway Center; 19,482	14–20
35	December 28	@ Miami	L 98–112	LeBron James (27)	LeBron James (9)	Russell Westbrook (8)	FTX Arena; 20,221	14–21
36	December 30	@ Atlanta	W 130–121	LeBron James (47)	Thomas Bryant (17)	Russell Westbrook (11)	State Farm Arena; 17,984	15–21

January: 9–7 (home: 5–4; road: 4–3)

Game	Date	Team	Score	High points	High rebounds	High assists	Location Attendance	Record
37	January 2	@ Charlotte	W 121–115	LeBron James (43)	Thomas Bryant (15)	Austin Reaves (7)	Spectrum Center; 19,210	16–21
38	January 4	Miami	W 112–109	Dennis Schröder (32)	Thomas Bryant (9)	Russell Westbrook (9)	Crypto.com Arena; 18,997	17–21
39	January 6	Atlanta	W 130–114	LeBron James (25)	Thomas Bryant (13)	LeBron James (10)	Crypto.com Arena; 18,997	18–21
40	January 7	@ Sacramento	W 136–134	LeBron James (37)	Thomas Bryant (14)	Russell Westbrook (15)	Golden 1 Center; 17,611	19–21
41	January 9	@ Denver	L 109–122	Russell Westbrook (25)	Thomas Bryant (10)	Russell Westbrook (7)	Ball Arena; 19,609	19–22
42	January 12	Dallas	L 115–119 (2OT)	Russell Westbrook (28)	LeBron James (16)	LeBron James (9)	Crypto.com Arena; 18,997	19–23
43	January 15	Philadelphia	L 112–113	LeBron James (35)	Russell Westbrook (14)	Russell Westbrook (11)	Crypto.com Arena; 18,020	19–24
44	January 16	Houston	W 140–132	LeBron James (48)	Wenyen Gabriel (9)	LeBron James (9)	Crypto.com Arena; 17,657	20–24
45	January 18	Sacramento	L 111–116	LeBron James (32)	LeBron James (8)	LeBron James (9)	Crypto.com Arena; 18,142	20–25
46	January 20	Memphis	W 122–121	Russell Westbrook (29)	LeBron James (9)	Dennis Schröder (8)	Crypto.com Arena; 18,997	21–25
47	January 22	@ Portland	W 121–112	LeBron James (37)	Thomas Bryant (14)	Dennis Schröder (8)	Moda Center; 19,393	22–25
48	January 24	L.A. Clippers	L 115–133	LeBron James (46)	LeBron James (8)	LeBron James (7)	Crypto.com Arena (LAL) -17,604	22–26
49	January 25	San Antonio	W 113–104	Anthony Davis (21)	Anthony Davis (12)	LeBron James (11)	Crypto.com Arena; 17,955	23–26
50	January 28	@ Boston	L 121–125 (OT)	LeBron James (41)	Anthony Davis (10)	LeBron James (8)	TD Garden; 19,156	23–27
51	January 30	@ Brooklyn	L 104–121	Thomas Bryant (18)	Troy Brown Jr. (17)	Russell Westbrook (10)	Barclays Center; 17,924	23–28
52	January 31	@ New York	W 129–123 (OT)	LeBron James (28)	LeBron James (10)	LeBron James (11)	Madison Square Garden; 19,812	24–28

February: 5–5 (home: 2–2; road: 3–3)

Game	Date	Team	Score	High points	High rebounds	High assists	Location Attendance	Record
53	February 2	@ Indiana	W 112–111	Anthony Davis (31)	Anthony Davis (14)	Russell Westbrook (10)	Gainbridge Fieldhouse; 17,274	25–28
54	February 4	@ New Orleans	L 126–131	Anthony Davis (34)	Anthony Davis (14)	Dennis Schröder (10)	Smoothie King Center; 19,812	25–29
55	February 7	Oklahoma City	L 130–133	LeBron James (38)	Anthony Davis (8)	Russell Westbrook (8)	Crypto.com Arena; 18,997	25–30
56	February 9	Milwaukee	L 106–115	Dennis Schröder (25)	Anthony Davis (16)	Dennis Schröder (12)	Crypto.com Arena; 18,997	25–31
57	February 11	@ Golden State	W 109–103	Dennis Schröder (26)	Anthony Davis (16)	D'Angelo Russell (6)	Chase Center; 18,064	26–31
58	February 13	@ Portland	L 115–127	Malik Beasley (22)	Anthony Davis (20)	Dennis Schröder (6)	Moda Center; 18,299	26–32
59	February 15	New Orleans	W 120–102	Anthony Davis (28)	Anthony Davis (10)	D'Angelo Russell (7)	Crypto.com Arena; 18,997	27–32
60	February 23	Golden State	W 124–111	Malik Beasley (25)	Mo Bamba (13)	LeBron James (8)	Crypto.com Arena; 18,997	28–32
61	February 26	@ Dallas	W 111–108	Anthony Davis (30)	Jarred Vanderbilt (17)	Dennis Schröder (8)	American Airlines Center; 20,411	29–32
62	February 28	@ Memphis	L 109–121	Anthony Davis (28)	Anthony Davis (19)	Dennis Schröder (10)	FedExForum; 17,794	29–33

March: 10–5 (home: 6–4; road: 4–1)

Game	Date	Team	Score	High points	High rebounds	High assists	Location Attendance	Record
63	March 1	@ Oklahoma City	W 123–117	Dennis Schröder (26)	Wenyen Gabriel (10)	Dennis Schröder (6)	Paycom Center; 17,114	30–33
64	March 3	Minnesota	L 102–110	Anthony Davis (38)	Malik Beasley (8)	Dennis Schröder (12)	Crypto.com Arena; 18,997	30–34
65	March 5	Golden State	W 113–105	Anthony Davis (39)	Jarred Vanderbilt (13)	Austin Reaves (8)	Crypto.com Arena; 18,997	31–34
66	March 7	Memphis	W 112–103	Anthony Davis (30)	Anthony Davis (22)	Dennis Schröder (9)	Crypto.com Arena; 18,997	32–34
67	March 10	Toronto	W 122–112	D'Angelo Russell (28)	Anthony Davis (9)	D'Angelo Russell (9)	Crypto.com Arena; 18,322	33–34
68	March 12	New York	L 108–112	D'Angelo Russell (33)	Anthony Davis (16)	D'Angelo Russell (8)	Crypto.com Arena; 18,997	33–35
69	March 14	@ New Orleans	W 123–108	Anthony Davis (35)	Anthony Davis (17)	Brown Jr., Reaves (5)	Smoothie King Center; 18,625	34–35
70	March 15	@ Houston	L 110–114	Austin Reaves (24)	Wenyen Gabriel (14)	Reaves, Russell (7)	Toyota Center; 18,055	34–36
71	March 17	Dallas	L 110–111	Anthony Davis (26)	Wenyen Gabriel (11)	D'Angelo Russell (11)	Crypto.com Arena; 18,997	34–37
72	March 19	Orlando	W 111–105	Austin Reaves (35)	Anthony Davis (11)	Reaves, Russell (6)	Crypto.com Arena; 18,997	35–37
73	March 22	Phoenix	W 122–111	Anthony Davis (27)	Anthony Davis (9)	Austin Reaves (11)	Crypto.com Arena; 18,435	36–37
74	March 24	Oklahoma City	W 116–111	Anthony Davis (37)	Anthony Davis (14)	Austin Reaves (9)	Crypto.com Arena; 18,997	37–37
75	March 26	Chicago	L 108–118	LeBron James (19)	Anthony Davis (9)	Austin Reaves (7)	Crypto.com Arena; 18,997	37–38
76	March 29	@ Chicago	W 121–110	Anthony Davis (38)	Anthony Davis (10)	Austin Reaves (5)	United Center; 21,739	38–38
77	March 31	@ Minnesota	W 123–111	Anthony Davis (38)	Anthony Davis (17)	D'Angelo Russell (10)	Target Center; 18,978	39–38

April : 4–1 (home: 2–0; road: 2–1)

Game	Date	Team	Score	High points	High rebounds	High assists	Location Attendance	Record
78	April 2	@ Houston	W 134–109	Anthony Davis (40)	Rui Hachimura (12)	LeBron James (11)	Toyota Center; 18,204	40–38
79	April 4	@ Utah	W 135–133 (OT)	LeBron James (37)	Anthony Davis (14)	Davis, James, Reaves (6)	Vivint Arena; 18,206	41–38
80	April 5	@ L.A. Clippers	L 118–125	LeBron James (33)	Anthony Davis (11)	James, Russell (7)	Crypto.com Arena (LAC); 19,068	41–39
81	April 7	Phoenix	W 121–107	D'Angelo Russell (24)	Anthony Davis (21)	LeBron James (6)	Crypto.com Arena; 18,997	42–39
82	April 9	Utah	W 128–117	LeBron James (36)	Anthony Davis (13)	James, Reaves (6)	Crypto.com Arena; 18,997	43–39

2022–23 season schedule

=== Play-in ===
2023 play-in game log
Total: 1–0 (home: 1–0; road: 0–0)
Play-in: 1–0 (home: 1–0; road: 0–0)

Game	Date	Team	Score	High points	High rebounds	High assists	Location Attendance	Record
1	April 11	Minnesota	W 108–102 (OT)	LeBron James (30)	Anthony Davis (15)	D'Angelo Russell (8)	Crypto.com Arena; 18,997	1–0

2022–23 season schedule

== Playoffs ==
=== Game log ===
2023 playoff game log
Total: 8–8 (home: 6–2; road: 2–6)
First Round: 4–2 (home: 3–0; road: 1–2)

Game	Date	Team	Score	High points	High rebounds	High assists	Location Attendance	Series
1	April 16	@ Memphis	W 128–112	Rui Hachimura (29)	Anthony Davis (12)	D'Angelo Russell (7)	FedExForum; 18,487	1–0
2	April 19	@ Memphis	L 93–103	LeBron James (28)	LeBron James (12)	Reaves, Russell (4)	FedExForum; 17,928	1–1
3	April 22	Memphis	W 111–101	Anthony Davis (31)	Anthony Davis (17)	D'Angelo Russell (7)	Crypto.com Arena; 18,997	2–1
4	April 24	Memphis	W 117–111 (OT)	Austin Reaves (23)	LeBron James (20)	LeBron James (7)	Crypto.com Arena; 18,997	3–1
5	April 26	@ Memphis	L 99–116	Anthony Davis (31)	Anthony Davis (19)	D'Angelo Russell (10)	FedExForum; 18,117	3–2
6	April 28	Memphis	W 125–85	D'Angelo Russell (31)	Anthony Davis (14)	Austin Reaves (8)	Crypto.com Arena; 18,997	4–2

Conference Semifinals: 4–2 (home: 3–0; road: 1–2)

Game	Date	Team	Score	High points	High rebounds	High assists	Location Attendance	Series
1	May 2	@ Golden State	W 117–112	Anthony Davis (30)	Anthony Davis (23)	D'Angelo Russell (6)	Chase Center; 18,064	1–0
2	May 4	@ Golden State	L 100–127	LeBron James (23)	Davis, James (7)	D'Angelo Russell (8)	Chase Center; 18,064	1–1
3	May 6	Golden State	W 127–97	Anthony Davis (25)	Anthony Davis (13)	LeBron James (8)	Crypto.com Arena; 18,997	2–1
4	May 8	Golden State	W 104–101	LeBron James (27)	Anthony Davis (15)	LeBron James (6)	Crypto.com Arena; 18,997	3–1
5	May 10	@ Golden State	L 106–121	LeBron James (25)	Davis, James (9)	Austin Reaves (5)	Chase Center; 18,064	3–2
6	May 12	Golden State	W 122–101	LeBron James (30)	Anthony Davis (20)	LeBron James (9)	Crypto.com Arena; 18,997	4–2

Conference Finals: 0–4 (home: 0–2; road: 0–2)

Game	Date	Team	Score	High points	High rebounds	High assists	Location Attendance	Series
1	May 16	@ Denver	L 126–132	Anthony Davis (40)	LeBron James (12)	LeBron James (9)	Ball Arena; 19,633	0–1
2	May 18	@ Denver	L 103–108	James, Reaves (22)	Anthony Davis (14)	LeBron James (10)	Ball Arena; 19,742	0–2
3	May 20	Denver	L 108–119	Anthony Davis (28)	Anthony Davis (18)	LeBron James (12)	Crypto.com Arena; 18,997	0–3
4	May 22	Denver	L 111–113	LeBron James (40)	Anthony Davis (14)	LeBron James (9)	Crypto.com Arena; 18,997	0–4

2023 playoff schedule

== Player statistics ==
Legend
GP	Games played	GS	Games started	MPG	Minutes per game
FG%	Field-goal percentage	3P%	3-point field-goal percentage	FT%	Free-throw percentage
RPG	Rebounds per game	APG	Assists per game	SPG	Steals per game
BPG	Blocks per game	PPG	Points per game

=== Regular season ===
Los Angeles Lakers statistics
Player	GP	GS	MPG	FG%	3P%	FT%	RPG	APG	SPG	BPG	PPG
Troy Brown Jr.	76	45	24.5	.430	.381	.872	4.1	1.3	.8	.2	7.1
Wenyen Gabriel	68	2	15.1	.596	.278	.619	4.2	.5	.4	.5	5.5
Dennis Schröder	66	50	30.1	.415	.329	.857	2.5	4.5	.8	.2	12.6
Austin Reaves	64	22	28.8	.529	.398	.864	3.0	3.4	.5	.3	13.0
Anthony Davis	56	54	34.0	.563	.257	.784	12.5	2.6	1.1	2.0	25.9
Lonnie Walker IV	56	32	23.2	.448	.365	.858	1.9	1.1	.5	.3	11.7
LeBron James	55	54	35.5	.500	.321	.768	8.3	6.8	.9	.6	28.9
Russell Westbrook^{†}	52	3	28.7	.417	.296	.655	6.2	7.5	1.0	.4	15.9
Patrick Beverley^{†}	45	45	26.9	.402	.348	.780	3.1	2.6	.9	.6	6.4
Thomas Bryant^{†}	41	25	21.4	.654	.440	.741	6.8	.7	.3	.6	12.1
Max Christie	41	3	12.5	.415	.419	.875	1.8	.5	.2	.2	3.1
Kendrick Nunn^{†}	39	2	13.5	.406	.325	.810	1.4	.9	.3	.1	6.7
Rui Hachimura^{†}	33	9	22.4	.485	.296	.721	4.7	.7	.2	.4	9.6
Juan Toscano-Anderson^{†}	30	7	12.2	.500	.200	.733	2.0	.8	.3	.2	2.7
Jarred Vanderbilt^{†}	26	24	24.0	.529	.303	.784	6.7	1.6	1.2	.2	7.2
Malik Beasley^{†}	26	14	23.9	.392	.353	.619	3.3	1.2	.8	.0	11.1
Damian Jones^{†}	22	1	8.0	.541	.000	.750	2.5	.2	.1	.5	2.5
D'Angelo Russell^{†}	17	17	30.9	.484	.414	.735	2.9	6.1	.6	.5	17.4
Matt Ryan^{†}	12	0	10.8	.306	.371	.800	1.2	.3	.2	.0	3.9
Mo Bamba^{†}	9	1	9.8	.407	.313	.545	4.6	.4	.1	.6	3.7
Davon Reed^{†}	8	0	3.4	.750	.500	.250	.5	.5	.3	.0	1.0
Cole Swider	7	0	5.9	.333	.375		1.0	.6	.0	.0	1.3
Scotty Pippen Jr.	6	0	5.3	.333	.333	.556	.7	.3	.3	.2	2.3
Sterling Brown	4	0	6.0	.000	.000		2.0	.5	.8	.0	.0

=== Playoffs ===
Los Angeles Lakers statistics
Player	GP	GS	MPG	FG%	3P%	FT%	RPG	APG	SPG	BPG	PPG
LeBron James	16	16	38.7	.498	.264	.761	9.9	6.5	1.1	1.1	24.5
Anthony Davis	16	16	38.0	.520	.333	.852	14.1	2.6	1.4	3.1	22.6
Austin Reaves	16	16	36.2	.464	.443	.895	4.4	4.6	.6	.2	16.9
D'Angelo Russell	16	15	29.6	.426	.310	.769	2.9	4.6	.7	.3	13.3
Dennis Schröder	16	3	26.1	.398	.333	.821	1.9	2.9	1.0	.2	7.4
Rui Hachimura	16	1	24.3	.557	.487	.882	3.6	.6	.5	.3	12.2
Jarred Vanderbilt	15	13	16.5	.400	.241	.700	3.2	.8	.7	.8	4.6
Lonnie Walker IV	13	0	13.8	.483	.382	.750	.9	.8	.5	.1	6.2
Troy Brown Jr.	12	0	10.3	.357	.133		2.0	.9	.2	.1	1.8
Malik Beasley	11	0	8.3	.294	.269	1.000	.7	.2	.1	.0	3.0
Wenyen Gabriel	10	0	3.7	.400		.667	.9	.0	.2	.3	1.0
Max Christie	9	0	3.7	.500	.250	.500	.8	.3	.0	.1	1.4
Shaquille Harrison	8	0	3.5	.571	1.000	.500	.4	1.1	.3	.0	1.3
Tristan Thompson	6	0	5.3	.455		.200	1.7	.3	.0	.0	1.8
Mo Bamba	3	0	3.3	.000	.000		1.0	.3	.0	.3	.0

- ^{†} Denotes player spent time with another team in the season. Stats reflect time with the Lakers only.

== Transactions ==
=== Trades ===
June 23, 2022
To Los Angeles Lakers

2022 No. 35 pick (Max Christie)
To Orlando Magic

2028 second-round pick
Cash considerations
August 25, 2022
To Los Angeles Lakers

Patrick Beverley
To Utah Jazz

Talen Horton-Tucker
Stanley Johnson
January 23, 2023
To Los Angeles Lakers

Rui Hachimura
To Washington Wizards

Kendrick Nunn
2023 CHI second-round pick
2028 second-round pick (Note: The worse of the picks originally belonging to the Lakers and Wizards. Washington traded its 2028 pick to the Lakers in 2021. The Lakers traded the better of their pick and Washington's to Orlando before the 2022 draft and then the Lakers traded the remaining pick to Washington in this trade. It's a pick swap without technically being considered a pick swap.)
2029 LAL second-round pick
February 9, 2023
To Los Angeles Lakers

Malik Beasley (from Utah)
D'Angelo Russell (from Minnesota)
Jarred Vanderbilt (from Utah)

To Minnesota Timberwolves

Nickeil Alexander-Walker (from Utah)
Mike Conley (from Utah)
2024 second-round pick (Note: The worse of the picks originally belonging to Memphis and Washington.) (from Los Angeles)
2025 UTA second-round pick (from Utah)
2026 UTA second-round pick (from Utah)

To Utah Jazz

Damian Jones (from Los Angeles)
Juan Toscano-Anderson (from Los Angeles)
Russell Westbrook (from Los Angeles)
2027 LAL protected first-round pick (Note: Utah will receive the pick if it's No. 5–30, otherwise they receive the Lakers' 2027 second-round pick.) (from Los Angeles)

February 9, 2023

To Los Angeles Lakers

Mo Bamba (from Orlando)
Davon Reed (from Denver)
2024 LAC second-round pick (from Clippers)
2025 LAC second-round pick (from Clippers)

To Orlando Magic

Patrick Beverley (from Lakers)
~~2024 DEN second-round pick (from Denver)~~ (Note: The pick was later traded to the Phoenix Suns, who later had to forfeit said pick due to a tampering violation.)
Cash considerations (from Lakers)

To Denver Nuggets

Thomas Bryant (from Lakers)

To Los Angeles Clippers

Bones Hyland (from Denver)

=== Free agency ===
==== Additions ====
Date	Player	Contract terms	Former team	Ref.
July 1	Damian Jones	2 year minimum	Sacramento Kings	
July 1	Troy Brown Jr.	1 year minimum	Chicago Bulls	
July 1	Juan Toscano-Anderson	1 year minimum	Golden State Warriors	
July 1	Scotty Pippen Jr.	Two-way contract	Vanderbilt Commodores	
July 1	Cole Swider	Two-way contract	Syracuse Orange	
July 6	Thomas Bryant	1 year minimum	Washington Wizards	
July 6	Lonnie Walker IV	1 year $6.5M	San Antonio Spurs	
September 16	Dennis Schröder	1-year minimum	Houston Rockets	
September 26	Matt Ryan	1-year minimum	Boston Celtics	

==== Subtractions ====
Date	Player	Reason	New team	Ref.
July 6	Malik Monk	2-year $19M	Sacramento Kings	
April 9	Davon Reed	Waived	(Latvia) Prometey Slobozhanske	
