= 2023 NBA Summer League =

- League: National Basketball Association
- Sport: Basketball
- Duration: July 7–17
- Games: 76 total games
- Teams: California Classic-6; Salt Lake City-4; Las Vegas-30
- TV partner(s): NBA TV & ESPN

California Classic
- Top scorer: Keegan Murray

Salt Lake City Summer League
- Season champions: Memphis Grizzlies
- Runners-up: Oklahoma City Thunder
- Top scorer: Tre Mann

Las Vegas NBA Summer League
- Season champions: Cleveland Cavaliers
- Runners-up: Houston Rockets
- Season MVP: Cam Whitmore (league); Isaiah Mobley (championship game)
- Top scorer: Jabari Smith Jr.

NBA Summer League seasons
- ← 2022 2024 →

The 2023 NBA Summer League (branded as NBA 2K24 Summer League 2023 for sponsorship reasons) was an off-season competition held by the National Basketball Association (NBA) primarily at the Thomas and Mack Center and Cox Pavilion in Las Vegas, Nevada, on the campus of University of Nevada, Las Vegas from July 7 to 17, 2023. The summer league consisted of the California Classic, Salt Lake City Summer League, and the Las Vegas NBA Summer League.

== California Classic ==
The Sacramento Kings hosted the fifth annual California Classic at Golden 1 Center on July 3 and 5.

=== Teams ===
- Charlotte Hornets
- Golden State Warriors
- Los Angeles Lakers
- Miami Heat
- Sacramento Kings
- San Antonio Spurs

=== Games ===
==== Day 1 ====
ESPN2

July 3
3:00 PM PDT

Boxscore

Miami Heat 107, Los Angeles Lakers 90
Scoring by quarter: 22–16, 36–24, 26–27, 23–23
Pts: Jaquez Jr. (22); Rebs: Jović & Robinson (8); Asts: Bouyea (9)	Pts: Christie (17); Rebs: Figueroa & Killeya-Jones (7); Asts: Hood-Schifino & Christie (4)

Golden 1 Center, Sacramento, California
Referees: Kevin Scott, Randy Richardson, Tom Washington

ESPN

July 3
5:00 PM PDT

Boxscore

San Antonio Spurs 96, Charlotte Hornets 77
Scoring by quarter: 30–11, 28–21, 21–21, 17–24
Pts: Champagnie (30); Rebs: Barlow (11); Asts: Wesley (8)	Pts: Miller (18); Rebs: Black, McGowens & Miller (5); Asts: Miller & Smith Jr. (3)

Golden 1 Center, Sacramento, California
Referees: John Butler, Dan Crawford, John Goble

ESPN

July 3
7:00 PM PDT

Boxscore

Golden State Warriors 94, Sacramento Kings 100
Scoring by quarter: 18–21, 22–26, 23–23, 31–30
Pts: Quiñones (26); Rebs: Podziemski (6); Asts: Collins (7)	Pts: Murray (29); Rebs: Queta (10); Asts: Ford (3)

Golden 1 Center, Sacramento, California
Attendance: 14,054
Referees: Jacob Lear, Brandon Schwab, Matt Kallio

==== Day 2 ====
ESPN2

July 5
3:00 PM PDT

Boxscore

Golden State Warriors 98, Charlotte Hornets 83
Scoring by quarter: 23–19, 25–21, 29–15, 21–28
Pts: Quiñones (21); Rebs: Johnson (12); Asts: Collins (5)	Pts: Bailey (17); Rebs: Bouknight (6); Asts: Miller (7)

Golden 1 Center, Sacramento, California
Referees: John Butler, Danielle Scott, Jacob Lear

ESPN

July 5
5:00 PM PDT

Boxscore

San Antonio Spurs 109, Los Angeles Lakers 99
Scoring by quarter: 29–28, 26–22, 29–21, 25–28
Pts: Branham (32); Rebs: Bediako (8); Asts: Barlow (6)	Pts: Christie (25); Rebs: Castleton (8); Asts: Castleton (6)

Golden 1 Center, Sacramento, California
Referees: Mousa Dagher, Jenna Schroeder, Che Flores

ESPN

July 5
7:00 PM PDT

Boxscore

Miami Heat 83, Sacramento Kings 95
Scoring by quarter: 14–21, 26–26, 30–21, 13–27
Pts: Jović (22); Rebs: Cain (6); Asts: Bouyea (4)	Pts: Murray (41); Rebs: Queta (9); Asts: Ford (6)

Golden 1 Center, Sacramento, California
Attendance: 12,933
Referees: Evan Scott, Brandon Schwab, Matt Kallio

== Salt Lake City Summer League ==
The Utah Jazz hosted a round-robin tournament at the Delta Center on July 3, 5, and 6.

=== Teams ===
- Utah Jazz
- Oklahoma City Thunder
- Memphis Grizzlies
- Philadelphia 76ers

=== Games ===
==== Day 1 ====
NBA TV

July 3
5:00 PM MDT/4:00 PM PDT

Boxscore

Memphis Grizzlies 94, Philadelphia 76ers 92
Scoring by quarter: 21–24, 25–25, 22–28, 26–15
Pts: Lofton Jr. (21); Rebs: Lofton Jr. (13); Asts: Gilyard (7)	Pts: Smith (18); Rebs: King (8); Asts: King (5)

Delta Center, Salt Lake City, Utah
Referees: Suyash Mehta, John Conley, Robert Hussey

NBA TV

July 3
7:00 PM MDT/6:00 PM PDT

Boxscore

Oklahoma City Thunder 95, Utah Jazz 85
Scoring by quarter: 16–13, 43–30, 23–19, 13–23
Pts: Jal. Williams (21); Rebs: Jay. Williams (13); Asts: Dieng & Jay. Williams (3)	Pts: George (18); Rebs: Agbaji & Hauser (9); Asts: George, Potter & Ross (4)

Delta Center, Salt Lake City, Utah
Attendance: 9,338
Referees: Andy Nagy, Dannica Mosher, Jason Stiell

==== Day 2 ====
NBA TV

July 5
5:00 PM MDT/4:00 PM PDT

Boxscore

Memphis Grizzlies 94, Oklahoma City Thunder 86
Scoring by quarter: 39–31, 17–23, 19–16, 19–16
Pts: LaRavia (25); Rebs: Williams Jr. (9); Asts: Gilyard (6)	Pts: Mann (28); Rebs: Holmgren (11); Asts: Butler (6)

Delta Center, Salt Lake City, Utah
Referees: Andy Nagy, Dannica Mosher, Robert Hussey

NBA TV

July 5
7:00 PM MDT/6:00 PM PDT

Boxscore

Philadelphia 76ers 104, Utah Jazz 94
Scoring by quarter: 20–34, 34–22, 27–23, 23–15
Pts: Smart (19); Rebs: Petrušev (8); Asts: Council IV & Smith (5)	Pts: Šamanić (19); Rebs: Šamanić (9); Asts: Ross (8)

Delta Center, Salt Lake City, Utah
Attendance: 8,074
Referees: Suyash Mehta, John Conley, Jason Stiell

==== Day 3 ====
ESPN

July 6
5:00 PM MDT/4:00 PM PDT

Boxscore

Oklahoma City Thunder 100, Philadelphia 76ers 91
Scoring by quarter: 36–17, 26–21, 21–24, 17–29
Pts: Mann (23); Rebs: Dieng (10); Asts: Butler & Mann (5)	Pts: Springer (17); Rebs: Petrušev (8); Asts: Smart (4)

Delta Center, Salt Lake City, Utah
Referees: John Conley, Robert Hussey, Jason Stiell

NBA TV

July 6
7:00 PM MDT/6:00 PM PDT

Boxscore

Memphis Grizzlies 83, Utah Jazz 98
Scoring by quarter: 25–18, 13–27, 27–22, 18–31
Pts: Jackson (23); Rebs: Jackson (10); Asts: Ayayi & Ferrari (4)	Pts: Agbaji (22); Rebs: Agbaji (13); Asts: George (5)

Delta Center, Salt Lake City, Utah
Attendance: 8,838
Referees: Andy Nagy, Suyash Mehta, Dannica Mosher

== Las Vegas Summer League ==
The Las Vegas NBA Summer League is an official summer league of the NBA—the seventeenth year it has been held. The league played games across two venues: the Thomas and Mack Center and Cox Pavilion, both located in Paradise, Nevada, which is near Las Vegas.

=== Format ===
- Number of Games: A total of 76 games will be played, Each team will play at least five games, and Each team will play four games from July 7–14.
- Four-Team Tournament: After each team plays four games, the top four teams will advance to the playoffs and participate in a semifinal game on July 16, and the two semifinal game winners will participate in the championship game on July 17. The top four playoff seeds will be determined by winning percentage with tiebreakers set forth below.
- Consolation Games: The 26 teams that did not advance to the four-team playoff will play a fifth game on either July 15 or July 16

==== Tiebreak criteria ====
1. Two Teams Tied – In the case of a tie in preliminary round records involving only two teams, the following criteria, in order, were utilized:

• Head-to-head matchup: The team that won the game between the two teams in the preliminary round, if applicable, receives the higher seed.

• Point differential: The team with the greater point differential receives the higher seed.

• Total Points: The team with the most total points will receive the higher seed

- Random drawing: If necessary, the higher seed will be determined by a "coin flip".

2. More Than Two Teams Tied – In the case of a tie in preliminary round records involving more than two teams, the following criteria, in order, were utilized:

• Point differential: The team with the greater point differential receives the higher seed.

• Total Points: The team with the most total points will receive the higher seed

• Random drawing: The higher seed shall be determined by a “coin flip.”

=== Teams ===
- Atlanta Hawks
- Boston Celtics
- Brooklyn Nets
- Charlotte Hornets
- Chicago Bulls
- Cleveland Cavaliers
- Dallas Mavericks
- Detroit Pistons
- Denver Nuggets
- Golden State Warriors
- Houston Rockets
- Indiana Pacers
- Los Angeles Clippers
- Los Angeles Lakers
- Memphis Grizzlies
- Miami Heat
- Milwaukee Bucks
- Minnesota Timberwolves
- New Orleans Pelicans
- New York Knicks
- Oklahoma City Thunder
- Orlando Magic
- Philadelphia 76ers
- Phoenix Suns
- Portland Trail Blazers
- Sacramento Kings
- San Antonio Spurs
- Toronto Raptors
- Utah Jazz
- Washington Wizards

=== Games ===
==== Day 1 ====
NBA TV

July 7
4:30 PM EDT/1:30 PM PDT

Boxscore

New Orleans Pelicans 88, Minnesota Timberwolves 102
Scoring by quarter: 21–28, 26–28, 28–16, 13–30
Pts: Daniels (18); Rebs: Seabron (8); Asts: Hawkins (5)	Pts: Williams (24); Rebs: Miller (11); Asts: Moore Jr. (6)

Cox Pavilion, Las Vegas, Nevada
Referees: Biniam Maru, Italo Araujo, Shante Anderson

ESPNU

July 7
5:00 PM EDT/2:00 PM PDT

Boxscore

Denver Nuggets 85, Milwaukee Bucks 92
Scoring by quarter: 22–21, 23–22, 18–26, 22–23
Pts: Watson (23); Rebs: Kamagate & Pickett (6); Asts: Golden & Pickett (5)	Pts: Beauchamp (23); Rebs: Beauchamp & Cook (8); Asts: Jackson Jr. (6)

Thomas & Mack Center, Las Vegas, Nevada
Referees: Nate Cearley, Gina Cross, Stacie Blow

NBA TV

July 7
6:30 PM EDT/3:30 PM PDT

Boxscore

Chicago Bulls 83, Toronto Raptors 74
Scoring by quarter: 21–21, 23–15, 23–23, 16–15
Pts: Darling (15); Rebs: Lewis & Porter (7); Asts: dos Santos (5)	Pts: Nowell (17); Rebs: Brown (9); Asts: Nowell (5)

Cox Pavilion, Las Vegas, Nevada
Referees: Agon Abazi, Jacob Barnett, Ajajay Gonnelli

ESPN

July 7
7:00 PM EDT/4:00 PM PDT

Boxscore

Portland Trail Blazers 99, Houston Rockets 100
Scoring by quarter: 32–30, 21–17, 23–24, 23–29
Pts: Sharpe (21); Rebs: Walker (10); Asts: Henderson (6)	Pts: Smith Jr. (33); Rebs: Whitmore (11); Asts: Eason & Thompson (5)

Thomas & Mack Center, Las Vegas, Nevada
Referees: Brent Haskill, M.P. Malo, Josh Wilson

NBA TV

July 7
8:30 PM EDT/5:30 PM PDT

Boxscore

Cleveland Cavaliers 101, Brooklyn Nets 97
Scoring by quarter: 28–17, 24–21, 15–33, 34–26
Pts: Cooper (27); Rebs: Merrill (10); Asts: Mobley (6)	Pts: Brooks & Wilson (17); Rebs: Clowney (7); Asts: Duke Jr. (4)

Cox Pavilion, Las Vegas, Nevada
Referees: Clare Aubry, Stephanie Barksdale, Sara Gamal Elsharnouby

ESPN

July 7
9:00 PM EDT/6:00 PM PDT

Boxscore

Charlotte Hornets 68, San Antonio Spurs 76
Scoring by quarter: 12–15, 14–23, 19–20
Pts: Miller (16); Rebs: Miller (11); Asts: Robinson & Smith Jr. (3)	Pts: Champagnie (20); Rebs: Barlow (9); Asts: Champagnie (6)

Thomas & Mack Center, Las Vegas, Nevada
Referees: J.D. Ralls, Cameron Gelinas, Erik Aellig

NBA TV

July 7
10:30 PM EDT/7:30 PM PDT

Boxscore

Sacramento Kings 80, Atlanta Hawks 76
Scoring by quarter: 19–16, 15–16, 26–23, 20–21
Pts: Ford (20); Rebs: Queta (12); Asts: Ellis & Queta (3)	Pts: Manek (17); Rebs: Griffin & Martin (9); Asts: Krejčí (5)

Cox Pavilion, Las Vegas, Nevada
Referees: Marcy Williams, Jason Alabanza, Mehdi Difallah

ESPN

July 7
11:00 PM EDT/8:00 PM PDT

Boxscore

Golden State Warriors 96, Los Angeles Lakers 103
Scoring by quarter: 22–25, 22–25, 24–28, 28–25
Pts: Santos (25); Rebs: Perry & Podziemski (11); Asts: Davis (8)	Pts: Christie (22); Rebs: Baugh, Castleton & Christie (7); Asts: Castleton (6)

Thomas & Mack Center, Las Vegas, Nevada
Referees: Tyler Ricks, Kaz Beverly, Yohan Rosso

==== Day 2 ====
NBA TV

July 8
3:00 PM EDT/12:00 PM PDT

Boxscore

Miami Heat 99, Boston Celtics 88
Scoring by quarter: 20–22, 37–29, 14–24, 28–13
Pts: Robinson (36); Rebs: Robinson (11); Asts: Smith (7)	Pts: Walsh (18); Rebs: Champagnie (11); Asts: Davison (11)

Cox Pavilion, Las Vegas, Nevada
Referees: Intae Hwang, Ben Stirt, Viola Gyorgyi

ESPN2

July 8
3:30 PM EDT/12:30 PM PDT

Boxscore

Dallas Mavericks 80, Oklahoma City Thunder 91
Scoring by quarter: 15–18, 27–30, 19–21, 19–22
Pts: Hardy (24); Rebs: Key (8); Asts: Wright IV (4)	Pts: Wallace (20); Rebs: Holmgren (10); Asts: Butler & Mann (5)

Thomas & Mack Center, Las Vegas, Nevada
Referees: Catherine Chang, Paul Tuomey, JP Primm

NBA TV

July 8
5:00 PM EDT/2:00 PM PDT

Boxscore

New York Knicks 101, Philadelphia 76ers 110
Scoring by quarter: 28–27, 20–29, 26–26, 27–28
Pts: Jeffries (20); Rebs: Skapintsev (8); Asts: Keels (4)	Pts: Springer (23); Rebs: Council IV (8); Asts: Smart & Smith (5)

Cox Pavilion, Las Vegas, Nevada
Referees: Ian McClenny, Grant Detrick, Gatis Salins

ESPN

July 8
5:30 PM EDT/2:30 PM PDT

Boxscore

Detroit Pistons 89, Orlando Magic 78
Scoring by quarter: 20–23, 23–20, 21–13, 25–22
Pts: Duren (17); Rebs: Wiseman (12); Asts: Ivey & Sykes (4)	Pts: Harris (21); Rebs: Harris (6); Asts: Black (5)

Thomas & Mack Center, Las Vegas, Nevada
Referees: Tyler Mirkovich, Gina Cross, Johnny Batista

NBA TV

July 8
7:00 PM EDT/4:00 PM PDT

Boxscore

Memphis Grizzlies 87, Chicago Bulls 80
Scoring by quarter: 28–21, 15–20, 18–20, 26–19
Pts: Lofton Jr. (23); Rebs: Roddy (8); Asts: Gilyard (8)	Pts: Freeman-Liberty (24); Rebs: Sanogo (12); Asts: Freeman-Liberty (5)

Cox Pavilion, Las Vegas, Nevada
Referees: Klajdi Mulla, Cameron Garber, Deldre Carr

ESPN2

July 8
8:00 PM EDT/5:00 PM PDT

Boxscore

Indiana Pacers 91, Washington Wizards 83
Scoring by quarter: 23–19, 28–10, 13–32, 27–22
Pts: Mathurin (27); Rebs: Jackson (14); Asts: Nembhard (8)	Pts: Davis (17); Rebs: Cooks (7); Asts: Davis & Jackson (3)

Thomas & Mack Center, Las Vegas, Nevada
Referees: Blanca Burns, Bobby Bissant, Julio Anaya

NBA TV

July 8
9:00 PM EDT/6:00 PM PDT

Boxscore

Milwaukee Bucks 84, Phoenix Suns 75
Scoring by quarter: 15–27, 25–23, 27–13, 17–12
Pts: Beauchamp (20); Rebs: Jackson Jr. (11); Asts: Mannion (6)	Pts: Camara (20); Rebs: Camara (8); Asts: Sherfield (6)

Cox Pavilion, Las Vegas, Nevada
Referees: Jenna Reneau, Kenny Gardner, Gytis Vilius

ESPN2

July 8
10:00 PM EDT/7:00 PM PDT

Boxscore

Los Angeles Clippers 99, Utah Jazz 105
Scoring by quarter: 24–31, 15–18, 21–17, 39–39
Pts: Moon (26); Rebs: Diabaté (12); Asts: Preston (10)	Pts: George (33); Rebs: Agbaji & Potter (9); Asts: George (10)

Thomas & Mack Center, Las Vegas, Nevada
Referees: Julian McFadden, Kaitlynn Bunger, Kerem Beki

==== Day 3 ====
NBA TV

July 9
3:30 PM EDT/12:00 PM PDT

Boxscore

Toronto Raptors 76, Cleveland Cavaliers 99
Scoring by quarter: 15–22, 18–27, 17–21, 26–29
Pts: Dick & Hogg (11); Rebs: Dick (8); Asts: Dick & Nowell (4)	Pts: Mobley (15); Rebs: Diop (9); Asts: Cooper (5)

Cox Pavilion, Las Vegas, Nevada
Referees: Isaac Barnett, CP Painter, Johnny Batista

ESPN2

July 9
4:00 PM EDT/1:00 PM PDT

Boxscore

Los Angeles Lakers 93, Charlotte Hornets 75
Scoring by quarter: 20–16, 19–24, 26–19, 28–16
Pts: Castleton (21); Rebs: Castleton (14); Asts: Christie (6)	Pts: McGowens, Scott & Smith Jr. (11); Rebs: Jones & Miller (8); Asts: Miller (4)

Thomas & Mack Center, Las Vegas, Nevada
Referees: Kevin Fahy, Cameron Gelinas, Gatis Salins

NBA TV

July 9
5:30 PM EDT/12:00 PM PDT

Boxscore

New York Knicks 80, Brooklyn Nets 98
Scoring by quarter: 28–23, 21–24, 15–24, 16–27
Pts: Brown Jr. (16); Rebs: Garrett (7); Asts: Martin (6)	Pts: Brooks (21); Rebs: Wilson (8); Asts: Chandler (7)

Cox Pavilion, Las Vegas, Nevada
Referees: Teresa Stuck, Matt Rafferty, Julio Anaya

ESPN2

July 9
6:00 PM EDT/3:00 PM PDT

Boxscore

Detroit Pistons 101, Houston Rockets 113
Scoring by quarter: 28–35, 15–27, 33–30, 25–21
Pts: Duren (23); Rebs: Duren & Wiseman (10); Asts: Ivey (10)	Pts: Smith Jr. (38); Rebs: Eason (9); Asts: Smith Jr. (6)

Thomas & Mack Center, Las Vegas, Nevada
Referees: Brent Haskill, Omar Bermudez, Daigo Urusima

NBA TV

July 9
7:30 PM EDT/4:30 PM PDT

Boxscore

Boston Celtics 98, Washington Wizards 103
Scoring by quarter: 25–22, 27–29, 23–29, 23–23
Pts: Champagnie (21); Rebs: Champagnie (12); Asts: Davison (9)	Pts: Rollins (17); Rebs: Vukčević (8); Asts: Rollins (9)

Cox Pavilion, Las Vegas, Nevada
Referees: Ken Jones, M.P. Malo, Kerem Beki

ESPN2

July 9
8:00 PM EDT/5:00 PM PDT

Boxscore

San Antonio Spurs 80, Portland Trail Blazers 85
Scoring by quarter: 8–19, 25–24, 19–23, 28–19
Pts: Wembanyama (27); Rebs: Wembanyama (12); Asts: Wesley (5)	Pts: Devoe (29); Rebs: Walker (11); Asts: Devoe (5)

Thomas & Mack Center, Las Vegas, Nevada
Referees: Nate Cearley, Ryan Johnson, Mehdi Difallah

NBA TV

July 9
9:30 PM EDT/6:30 PM PDT

Boxscore

Atlanta Hawks 98, Denver Nuggets 93
Scoring by quarter: 25–27, 24–14, 22–19, 27–33
Pts: Martin (21); Rebs: Gueye & Manek (6); Asts: Bufkin & Krejčí (6)	Pts: Gillespie, Pickett & Tyson (16); Rebs: Simms (5); Asts: Pickett (5)

Cox Pavilion, Las Vegas, Nevada
Referees: Hortencia Sanchez-Carrizales, Josh Wilson, Viola Gyorgyi

ESPN2

July 9
10:00 PM EDT/7:00 PM PDT

Boxscore

New Orleans Pelicans 94, Golden State Warriors 86
Scoring by quarter: 21–22, 23–29, 26–16, 24–19
Pts: Seabron (25); Rebs: Daniels (15); Asts: Daniels (8)	Pts: Quiñones (26); Rebs: Podziemski (9); Asts: Podziemski (10)

Thomas & Mack Center, Las Vegas, Nevada
Referees: Julian Scott, Italo Araujo, Gytis Vilius

==== Day 4 ====
ESPNews

July 10
6:00 PM EDT/3:00 PM PDT

Boxscore

Memphis Grizzlies 77, Cleveland Cavaliers 100
Scoring by quarter: 19–24, 22–26, 20–26, 16–24
Pts: Roddy (18); Rebs: Lofton Jr. (6); Asts: Gilyard (5)	Pts: Merrill (27); Rebs: Diop (9); Asts: Porter (6)

Cox Pavilion, Las Vegas, Nevada
Referees: Jason Alabanza, Sarah Williams, Sara Gamal Elsharnouby

NBA TV

July 10
6:30 PM EDT/3:30 PM PDT

Boxscore

Phoenix Suns 73, Miami Heat 70
Scoring by quarter: 20–18, 19–12, 19–23, 15–17
Pts: B. Brown (14); Rebs: G. Brown (7); Asts: Sherfield (5)	Pts: Cain (18); Rebs: Bouyea & Robinson (9); Asts: Bouyea (9)

Thomas & Mack Center, Las Vegas, Nevada
Referees: Julian McFadden, Omar Bermudez, Kastine Evans

ESPNU

July 10
8:00 PM EDT/5:00 PM PDT

Boxscore

Philadelphia 76ers 103, Dallas Mavericks 111
Scoring by quarter: 31–24, 31–25, 27–25, 14–37
Pts: Hardy (24); Rebs: Lively II (11); Asts: Hardy (5)	Pts: Steward (24); Rebs: Brown III & Smith (6); Asts: Smart & Smith (6)

Cox Pavilion, Las Vegas, Nevada
Referees: Intae Hwang, Klajdi Mulla, Stacie Blow

NBA TV

July 10
8:30 PM EDT/5:30 PM PDT

Boxscore

Indiana Pacers 108, Orlando Magic 85
Scoring by quarter: 23–17, 34–17, 21–28, 30–23
Pts: Nembhard (21); Rebs: Jackson (11); Asts: Nembhard (7)	Pts: Houstan (18); Rebs: Wilson (8); Asts: Howard (5)

Thomas & Mack Center, Las Vegas, Nevada
Referees: Jenna Reneau, Gina Catanzariti, Shante Anderson

ESPNU

July 10
10:00 PM EDT/7:00 PM PDT

Boxscore

Minnesota Timberwolves 96, Utah Jazz 108
Scoring by quarter: 25–27, 25–24, 26–28, 20–29
Pts: Miller (20); Rebs: Minott (6); Asts: Williams (7)	Pts: George & Juzang (26); Rebs: Potter (12); Asts: George & Potter (7)

Cox Pavilion, Las Vegas, Nevada
Referees: Blanca Burns, Erik Aellig, Paul Tuomey

NBA TV

July 10
10:30 PM EDT/7:30 PM PDT

Boxscore

Sacramento Kings 70, Los Angeles Clippers 80
Scoring by quarter: 16–17, 9–27, 18–11, 27–25
Pts: Jones (19); Rebs: Jones (9); Asts: Ellis (5)	Pts: Bowden & Moon (18); Rebs: Diabaté (9); Asts: Moon (6)

Thomas & Mack Center, Las Vegas, Nevada
Referees: Catherine Chang, Stephanie Barksdale, Yohan Rosso

==== Day 5 ====
ESPNU

July 11
6:00 PM EDT/3:00 PM PDT

Boxscore

Brooklyn Nets 92, Milwaukee Bucks 71
Scoring by quarter: 18–18, 22–22, 35–9, 17–22
Pts: Duke Jr. (24); Rebs: Duke Jr. & Wilson (8); Asts: Chandler (7)	Pts: Wigginton (11); Rebs: Jackson Jr. (7); Asts: Mannion (4)

Cox Pavilion, Las Vegas, Nevada
Referees: J.D. Ralls, Italo Araujo, Viola Gyorgyi

NBA TV

July 11
6:30 PM EDT/3:30 PM PDT

Boxscore

Houston Rockets 105, Oklahoma City Thunder 92
Scoring by quarter: 34–31, 28–15, 22–23, 21–23
Pts: Hudgins (26); Rebs: Mayer (10); Asts: Hudgins (7)	Pts: Williams (19); Rebs: Williams (13); Asts: Maldonado (5)

Thomas & Mack Center, Las Vegas, Nevada
Referees: Kevin Fahy, Maripier Malo, Johnny Batista

ESPN2

July 11
8:00 PM EDT/5:00 PM PDT

Boxscore

Phoenix Suns 73, New Orleans Pelicans 82
Scoring by quarter: 15–17, 21–22, 18–20, 19–23
Pts: Hale (21); Rebs: Jemison (11); Asts: Sherfield (5)	Pts: Jones (16); Rebs: Seabron (7); Asts: Daniels (8)

Cox Pavilion, Las Vegas, Nevada
Referees: Ian McClenny, Jacob Barnett, Gatis Salins

NBA TV

July 11
8:30 PM EDT/5:30 PM PDT

Boxscore

Portland Trail Blazers 97, Charlotte Hornets 93
Scoring by quarter: 29–26, 24–22, 15–20, 29–25
Pts: Sharpe (26); Rebs: Reath (9); Asts: Devoe (7)	Pts: Smith Jr. (33); Rebs: Miller (6); Asts: Smith Jr. (3)

Thomas & Mack Center, Las Vegas, Nevada
Referees: Clare Aubry, Ben Stirt, Julio Anaya

ESPN2

July 11
10:00 PM EDT/7:00 PM PDT

Boxscore

Chicago Bulls 107, Sacramento Kings 99
Scoring by quarter: 26–21, 29–27, 22–31, 30–20
Pts: Freeman-Liberty (28); Rebs: Sanogo (9); Asts: Freeman-Liberty (6)	Pts: Ford (25); Rebs: Daum & Ellis (7); Asts: Ford (8)

Cox Pavilion, Las Vegas, Nevada
Referees: Angel Kent, Kaz Beverly, Daigo Urusima

NBA TV

July 11
10:30 PM EDT/7:30 PM PDT

Boxscore

Washington Wizards 85, San Antonio Spurs 96
Scoring by quarter: 19–20, 27–26, 19–20, 20–30
Pts: Cooks (16); Rebs: Cooks (10); Asts: Coulibaly (4)	Pts: Branham (29); Rebs: Champagnie (8); Asts: Champagnie (7)

Thomas & Mack Center, Las Vegas, Nevada
Referees: Isaac Barnett, Cameron Garber, Kerem Beki

==== Day 6 ====
NBA TV

July 12
3:30 PM EDT/12:30 PM PDT

Boxscore

Los Angeles Clippers 83, Memphis Grizzlies 74
Scoring by quarter: 26–19, 15–16, 16–21, 26–18
Pts: Moon (16); Rebs: Brown & Preston (10); Asts: Preston (5)	Pts: Lofton Jr. (24); Rebs: Lofton Jr. (10); Asts: Gilyard & Roddy (6)

Cox Pavilion, Las Vegas, Nevada
Referees: Ashley Gloss, Bobby Bissant, Yohan Rosso

ESPN2

July 12
4:00 PM EDT/1:00 PM PDT

Boxscore

Minnesota Timberwolves 93, Atlanta Hawks 99
Scoring by quarter: 20–21, 20–29, 29–20, 24–29
Pts: Williams (23); Rebs: Minott (8); Asts: Carton (7)	Pts: Martin (25); Rebs: Martin (9); Asts: Krejčí (6)

Thomas & Mack Center, Las Vegas, Nevada
Referees: Agon Abazi, Paul Tuomey, Sara Gamal Elsharnouby

NBA TV

July 12
5:30 PM EDT/2:30 PM PDT

Boxscore

Golden State Warriors 96, Dallas Mavericks 98 (OT)
Scoring by quarter: 16–20, 20–22, 25–22, 29–26, Overtime: 6–8
Pts: Quiñones (29); Rebs: Perry (17); Asts: Podziemski (7)	Pts: Hardy (21); Rebs: Lively II & Prosper (10); Asts: Miles Jr. (4)

Cox Pavilion, Las Vegas, Nevada
Referees: Marcy Williams, Kaitlynn Bunger, Jafar Kinsey

ESPN2

July 12
6:00 PM EDT/3:00 PM PDT

Boxscore

Toronto Raptors 90, Detroit Pistons 94
Scoring by quarter: 18–26, 36–16, 19–25, 17–27
Pts: Dick (22); Rebs: Brown (8); Asts: Nowell (6)	Pts: Rhoden (18); Rebs: Thompson (9); Asts: Sasser (7)

Thomas & Mack Center, Las Vegas, Nevada
Referees: Charles Watson, Kelsey Reynolds, Gytis Vilius

NBA TV

July 12
7:30 PM EDT/4:30 PM PDT

Boxscore

Oklahoma City Thunder 98, Indiana Pacers 87
Scoring by quarter: 20–13, 30–26, 22–24, 26–24
Pts: Holmgren (25); Rebs: Dieng & Holmgren (9); Asts: Butler (7)	Pts: Walker (20); Rebs: Tshiebwe (11); Asts: Wong (4)

Cox Pavilion, Las Vegas, Nevada
Referees: Intae Hwang, Rachael Rayford, Kastine Evans

ESPN2

July 12
8:00 PM EDT/5:00 PM PDT

Boxscore

New York Knicks 82, Orlando Magic 80 (OT)
Scoring by quarter: 19–23, 22–18, 12–23, 22–11, Overtime: 7–5
Pts: Brown Jr. (19); Rebs: Peterson (9); Asts: Garrett & Peterson (5)	Pts: Howard (22); Rebs: Black (14); Asts: Black (4)

Thomas & Mack Center, Las Vegas, Nevada
Referees: Pat O'Connell, Leah Lanie, Ajay Gonnelli

NBA TV

July 12
9:30 PM EDT/6:30 PM PDT

Boxscore

Denver Nuggets 91, Utah Jazz 96
Scoring by quarter: 16–30, 19–25, 25–16, 31–25
Pts: Strawther (21); Rebs: Tyson (12); Asts: Pickett (8)	Pts: Agbaji & Šamanić (14); Rebs: Potter (10); Asts: Hauser, Justice & Juzang (3)

Cox Pavilion, Las Vegas, Nevada
Referees: Klajdi Mulla, Gina Catanzariti, Josh Reed

ESPN2

July 12
10:00 PM EDT/7:00 PM PDT

Boxscore

Los Angeles Lakers 90, Boston Celtics 95
Scoring by quarter: 28–19, 25–24, 17–30, 20–22
Pts: Christie (24); Rebs: Castleton & Christie (8); Asts: Castleton (6)	Pts: Walsh (25); Rebs: Davison (11); Asts: Banton & Davison (6)

Thomas & Mack Center, Las Vegas, Nevada
Referees: Julian McFadden, Gerda Gatling, JP Primm

==== Day 7 ====
ESPN2

July 13
3:00 PM EDT/12:00 PM PDT

Boxscore

Cleveland Cavaliers 87, Chicago Bulls 83
Scoring by quarter: 29–19, 19–25, 20–25, 19–14
Pts: Porter (22); Rebs: Mobley (12); Asts: Porter (6)	Pts: Freeman-Liberty (18); Rebs: Sanogo (8); Asts: dos Santos (4)

Thomas & Mack Center, Las Vegas, Nevada
Referees: ShaRae Mitchell, Grant Detrick, Cameron Garber

NBA TV

July 13
3:30 PM EDT/12:30 PM PDT

Boxscore

Philadelphia 76ers 98, Atlanta Hawks 99
Scoring by quarter: 22–21, 28–22, 25–25, 23–31
Pts: Springer (29); Rebs: Brown III (7); Asts: Smart (6)	Pts: Lundy (16); Rebs: Gueye, Lundy & Plavšić (8); Asts: Bufkin (7)

Cox Pavilion, Las Vegas, Nevada
Referees: Ken Jones, Cameron Gelinas, Stephanie Barksdale

ESPN2

July 13
5:00 PM EDT/2:00 PM PDT

Boxscore

Brooklyn Nets 99, Toronto Raptors 94 (OT)
Scoring by quarter: 20–17, 28–17, 23–30, 20–27, Overtime: 8–3
Pts: Wilson (17); Rebs: Brooks (9); Asts: Brooks & Gray (4)	Pts: Harper Jr. (19); Rebs: Brown (10); Asts: Nembhard (5)

Thomas & Mack Center, Las Vegas, Nevada
Referees: Ashley Gloss, Nate Cearley, Shante Anderson

NBA TV

July 13
5:30 PM EDT/2:30 PM PDT

Boxscore

Miami Heat 91, Milwaukee Bucks 72
Scoring by quarter: 20–14, 26–19, 20–16, 25–23
Pts: Robinson (25); Rebs: Cain & Robinson (8); Asts: Bouyea (10)	Pts: Wigginton (15); Rebs: Jackson Jr. & Livingston (7); Asts: Beauchamp & Molinar (3)

Cox Pavilion, Las Vegas, Nevada
Referees: Tyler Mirkovich, Chelisa Painter, Josh Wilson

ESPN

July 13
7:00 PM EDT/4:00 PM PDT

Boxscore

Houston Rockets 118, Golden State Warriors 101
Scoring by quarter: 30–29, 37–20, 23–25, 28–27
Pts: Whitmore (26); Rebs: Mayer (8); Asts: Hudgins (11)	Pts: Davis (18); Rebs: Mike, Perry & Quiñones (8); Asts: Quiñones (8)

Thomas & Mack Center, Las Vegas, Nevada
Referees: Hortencia Sanchez-Carrizales, Ryan Sassano, Isaac Barnett

NBA TV

July 13
7:30 PM EDT/4:30 PM PDT

Boxscore

Charlotte Hornets 83, New Orleans Pelicans 89
Scoring by quarter: 5–25, 29–14, 21–30, 28–20
Pts: Bouknight (28); Rebs: Nnaji (12); Asts: Smith Jr. (4)	Pts: Seabron (20); Rebs: Hawkins (8); Asts: Daniels (5)

Cox Pavilion, Las Vegas, Nevada
Referees: Brent Haskill, Ryan Johnson, Ian McClenny

ESPN2

July 13
9:00 PM EDT/6:00 PM PDT

Boxscore

Portland Trail Blazers 88, Orlando Magic 71
Scoring by quarter: 23–12, 22–7, 24–27, 19–25
Pts: Devoe (18); Rebs: Rupert (12); Asts: Davis (4)	Pts: Dennis (16); Rebs: Toney (7); Asts: Weatherspoon (6)

Thomas & Mack Center, Las Vegas, Nevada
Referees: J.D. Ralls, Ben Stirt, Kenny Gardner

NBA TV

July 13
9:30 PM EDT/6:30 PM PDT

Boxscore

Minnesota Timberwolves 80, Sacramento Kings 93
Scoring by quarter: 16–21, 19–20, 22–24, 23–28
Pts: Minott (18); Rebs: Miller (11); Asts: Carton (9)	Pts: Edwards (18); Rebs: Edwards (8); Asts: Ford (7)

Cox Pavilion, Las Vegas, Nevada
Referees: Angel Kent, Stacie Blow, Matt Rafferty

==== Day 8 ====
NBA TV

July 14
4:30 PM EDT/1:30 PM PDT

Boxscore

Oklahoma City Thunder 89, Washington Wizards 105
Scoring by quarter: 20–28, 22–20, 28–30, 19–27
Pts: Butler (22); Rebs: Maldonado & Williams (7); Asts: Dieng (5)	Pts: Davis (22); Rebs: Baldwin (9); Asts: Rollins (7)

Cox Pavilion, Las Vegas, Nevada
Referees: Biniam Maru, Erik Aellig, Rachael Rayford

ESPN2

July 14
5:00 PM EDT/2:00 PM PDT

Boxscore

Los Angeles Clippers 102, Philadelphia 76ers 91
Scoring by quarter: 24–25, 17–31, 31–22, 30–13
Pts: Brown (35); Rebs: Brown (8); Asts: Preston & Wallace (4)	Pts: Springer (15); Rebs: Brown III (8); Asts: Smith (5)

Thomas & Mack Center, Las Vegas, Nevada
Referees: Tyler Ricks, Marcy Williams, Leah Lanie

NBA TV

July 14
6:30 PM EDT/3:30 PM PDT

Boxscore

Boston Celtics 89, New York Knicks 97
Scoring by quarter: 20–31, 18–26, 28–18, 23–22
Pts: Banton (18); Rebs: Banton (9); Asts: Davison (4)	Pts: Brown Jr. (27); Rebs: Brown Jr. (7); Asts: Brown Jr. (5)

Cox Pavilion, Las Vegas, Nevada
Referees: Agon Abazi, Jason Alabanza, Gerda Gatling

ESPN2

July 14
7:00 PM EDT/4:00 PM PDT

Boxscore

Dallas Mavericks 112, Indiana Pacers 91
Scoring by quarter: 19–15, 29–18, 31–31, 33–27
Pts: Lawson (24); Rebs: Lively II & Moore (8); Asts: Walker (8)	Pts: Sheppard (19); Rebs: Tshiebwe (7); Asts: Woodard II (4)

Thomas & Mack Center, Las Vegas, Nevada
Referees: Blanca Burns, Catherine Chang, Jafar Kinsey

NBA TV

July 14
8:30 PM EDT/5:30 PM PDT

Boxscore

Miami Heat 81, Denver Nuggets 112
Scoring by quarter: 17–31, 19–26, 18–30, 27–25
Pts: Bouyea (20); Rebs: Bouyea & Gardner (6); Asts: Audige & Bouyea (3)	Pts: Tyson (31); Rebs: Gillespie (9); Asts: Gillespie (8)

Cox Pavilion, Las Vegas, Nevada
Referees: ShaRae Mitchell, Ryan Sassano, Italo Araujo

ESPN2

July 14
9:00 PM EDT/6:00 PM PDT

Boxscore

San Antonio Spurs 73, Detroit Pistons 79
Scoring by quarter: 21–28, 23–13, 17–16, 12–22
Pts: Barlow (19); Rebs: Barlow (11); Asts: McCoy (4)	Pts: Thompson (18); Rebs: Thompson (14); Asts: Simpson (4)

Thomas & Mack Center, Las Vegas, Nevada
Referees: Julian Scott, Teresa Stuck, Josh Reed

NBATV

July 14
10:30 PM EDT/7:30 PM PDT

Boxscore

Utah Jazz 97, Phoenix Suns 93
Scoring by quarter: 22–25, 21–22, 21–25, 33–21
Pts: Juzang (24); Rebs: Juzang (7); Asts: 5 players (4)	Pts: Sherfield (23); Rebs: Camara (7); Asts: Camara (4)

Cox Pavilion, Las Vegas, Nevada
Referees: Charles Watson, Kelsey Reynolds, Kaz Beverly

ESPN2

July 14
11:00 PM EDT/8:00 PM PDT

Boxscore

Memphis Grizzlies 100, Los Angeles Lakers 69
Scoring by quarter: 24–9, 27–13, 20–27, 29–20
Pts: Roddy (21); Rebs: Williams Jr. (11); Asts: Gilyard (7)	Pts: Figueroa (15); Rebs: Swider (9); Asts: Hodge (3)

Thomas & Mack Center, Las Vegas, Nevada
Referees: Julian McFadden, Sarah Williams, Ajay Gonnelli

==== Day 9 ====
NBA TV

July 15
2:30 PM EDT/10:30 AM PDT

Boxscore

Charlotte Hornets 109, Minnesota Timberwolves 92
Scoring by quarter: 27–21, 33–24, 28–23, 21–24
Pts: Bailey (17); Rebs: Scott (7); Asts: Robinson & Simmons (8)	Pts: Cooke (16); Rebs: Miller (7); Asts: Carton (7)

Thomas & Mack Center, Las Vegas, Nevada
Referees: Kevin Fahy, Omar Bermudez, JP Primm

ESPN

July 15
3:00 PM EDT/12:00 PM PDT

Boxscore

Golden State Warriors 101, Toronto Raptors 108
Scoring by quarter: 19–28, 31–18, 27–22, 24–40
Pts: Quiñones (32); Rebs: Jackson-Davis (10); Asts: Collins (7)	Pts: Wieskamp (27); Rebs: Brown (6); Asts: Nowell (12)

Cox Pavilion, Las Vegas, Nevada
Referees: Biniam Maru, Grant Detrick, Jafar Kinsey

NBA TV

July 15
4:30 PM EDT/1:30 PM PDT

Boxscore

Milwaukee Bucks 84, Sacramento Kings 92
Scoring by quarter: 21–27, 21–26, 22–12, 20–27
Pts: Livingston (22); Rebs: Montgomery (6); Asts: Randall II (8)	Pts: Slawson (17); Rebs: Daum & Slawson (7); Asts: Goodwin, O'Connell & Slawson (4)

Thomas & Mack Center, Las Vegas, Nevada
Referees: Hortencia Sanchez-Carrizales, Klajdi Mulla, Bobby Bissant

ESPN

July 15
5:00 PM EDT/2:00 PM PDT

Boxscore

Washington Wizards 85, Chicago Bulls 90
Scoring by quarter: 17–13, 21–20, 13–24, 34–33
Pts: Bernard (17); Rebs: Vukčević (8); Asts: Jackson (7)	Pts: Freeman-Liberty (24); Rebs: Sanogo (9); Asts: Freeman-Liberty (5)

Cox Pavilion, Las Vegas, Nevada
Referees: Angel Kent, Cameron Garber, Josh Reed

NBA TV

July 15
6:30 PM EDT/3:30 PM PDT

Boxscore

Boston Celtics 94, Orlando Magic 77
Scoring by quarter: 16–20, 27–14, 34–23, 17–20
Pts: Bodon (13); Rebs: Bodon (6); Asts: Baldwin & Davison (6)	Pts: Baker (15); Rebs: Baker (11); Asts: Hardy & Weatherspoon (3)

Thomas & Mack Center, Las Vegas, Nevada
Referees: Tyler Mirkovich, Nate Cearley, Gina Catanzariti

NBA TV

July 15
8:30 PM EDT/5:30 PM PDT

Boxscore

Denver Nuggets 89, New York Knicks 86
Scoring by quarter: 21–9, 26–23, 23–25, 19–29
Pts: Strawther (25); Rebs: Strawther (9); Asts: Gillespie & Pickett (6)	Pts: Peterson (25); Rebs: Skapintsev (9); Asts: Garrett (5)

Thomas & Mack Center, Las Vegas, Nevada
Referees: Ian McClenny, Kaitlynn Bunger, Kenny Gardner

NBA TV

July 15
10:30 PM EDT/7:30 PM PDT

Boxscore

Memphis Grizzlies 79, Phoenix Suns 102
Scoring by quarter: 22–27, 22–23, 16–20, 19–32
Pts: Biberović & Mohammed (13); Rebs: Jackson (6); Asts: 4 players (3)	Pts: Camara (20); Rebs: Camara & Jemison (10); Asts: Usher (5)

Thomas & Mack Center, Las Vegas, Nevada
Referees: Isaac Barnett, Ken Jones, Kastine Evans

==== Day 10 ====
NBA TV

July 16
3:30 PM EDT/12:30 PM PDT

Boxscore

Philadelphia 76ers 117, New Orleans Pelicans 114
Scoring by quarter: 32–14, 25–36, 26–33, 34–31
Pts: Steward (36); Rebs: Brown III (9); Asts: Smart (9)	Pts: Liddell (23); Rebs: Daniels (11); Asts: Daniels (8)

Cox Pavilion, Las Vegas, Nevada
Referees: Ashley Gloss, Chelisa Painter, Paul Tuomey

ESPN

July 16
4:00 PM EDT/1:00 PM PDT

Boxscore

Brooklyn Nets 99, Cleveland Cavaliers 102 (OT)
Scoring by quarter: 21–26, 24–19, 17–28, 32–21, Overtime: 5–8
Pts: Brooks & Wilson (22); Rebs: Wilson (11); Asts: Chandler (7)	Pts: Mobley (23); Rebs: Travers (12); Asts: Porter (7)

Thomas & Mack Center, Las Vegas, Nevada
Referees: Pat O'Connell, Intae Hwang, Jenna Reneau

NBA TV

July 16
5:30 PM EDT/2:30 PM PDT

Boxscore

Detroit Pistons 100, Indiana Pacers 85
Scoring by quarter: 19–16, 23–31, 26–16, 32–22
Pts: Sasser (40); Rebs: Sylla (10); Asts: Sasser (5)	Pts: Wong (24); Rebs: Woodard II (11); Asts: Wong (3)

Cox Pavilion, Las Vegas, Nevada
Referees: Ryan Sassano, Matt Rafferty, Sarah Williams

ESPN2

July 16
6:00 PM EDT/3:00 PM PDT

Boxscore

Utah Jazz 101, Houston Rockets 115
Scoring by quarter: 19–19, 18–30, 35–32, 29–36
Pts: Justice, Potter & Ross (20); Rebs: Potter (12); Asts: Ross (6)	Pts: Hinton (27); Rebs: Samuels Jr. (10); Asts: Hudgins (9)

Thomas & Mack Center, Las Vegas, Nevada
Referees: Tyler Ricks, Tyler Mirkovich, Blanca Burns

NBA TV

July 16
7:30 PM EDT/4:30 PM PDT

Boxscore

Oklahoma City Thunder 94, San Antonio Spurs 98
Scoring by quarter: 17–29, 25–24, 29–27, 23–18
Pts: Butler (31); Rebs: Sueing (6); Asts: Dieng (6)	Pts: Stevenson (23); Rebs: Bediako (11); Asts: Cissoko (6)

Cox Pavilion, Las Vegas, Nevada
Referees: Ian McClenny, Leah Lanie, Gerda Gatling

ESPN2

July 16
8:00 PM EDT/5:00 PM PDT

Boxscore

Miami Heat 104, Portland Trail Blazers 78
Scoring by quarter: 26–22, 22–30, 28–7, 28–19
Pts: Robinson (27); Rebs: Robinson (9); Asts: Robinson (6)	Pts: Reath (18); Rebs: Reath (6); Asts: Devoe (5)

Thomas & Mack Center, Las Vegas, Nevada
Referees: Julian Scott, Kelsey Reynolds, Ryan Johnson

NBATV

July 16
9:30 PM EDT/6:30 PM PDT

Boxscore

Atlanta Hawks 80, Dallas Mavericks 101
Scoring by quarter: 23–19, 21–27, 18–36, 18–19
Pts: Bufkin (18); Rebs: Kabengele, Norris & Santos (6); Asts: Kabengele & Martin (4)	Pts: Walker (22); Rebs: Lively II (6); Asts: Miles Jr. (8)

Cox Pavilion, Las Vegas, Nevada
Referees: Clare Aubry, Cameron Gelinas, Jacob Barnett

ESPN2

July 16
10:00 PM EDT/7:00 PM PDT

Boxscore

Los Angeles Lakers 104, Los Angeles Clippers 103
Scoring by quarter: 22–28, 26–19, 26–32, 30–24
Pts: Figueroa & Hodge (23); Rebs: Castleton (14); Asts: Castleton & Hamilton (6)	Pts: Moon (21); Rebs: Moon (8); Asts: Moon (10)

Thomas & Mack Center, Las Vegas, Nevada
Referees: Hortencia Sanchez-Carrizales, Charles Watson, Rachael Rayford

==== Day 11 ====
ESPN

July 17
9:00 PM EDT/6:00 PM PDT

Boxscore

Houston Rockets 78, Cleveland Cavaliers 99
Scoring by quarter: 14–28, 30–23, 15–28, 19–20
Pts: Hinton (18); Rebs: Hinton (10); Asts: Hudgins (7)	Pts: Mobley (28); Rebs: Mobley (11); Asts: Porter (8)

Thomas & Mack Center, Las Vegas, Nevada
Referees: ShaRae Mitchell, J.D. Ralls, Brent Haskill
