= Jay Huff =

American basketball player (born 1997)

- Huff in 2026

No. 32 – Indiana Pacers
- Position: Center
- League: NBA

Personal information
- Born: August 25, 1997 (age 29) Durham, North Carolina, U.S.
- Listed height: 7 ft 1 in (2.16 m)
- Listed weight: 240 lb (109 kg)

Career information
- High school: Voyager Academy (Durham, North Carolina)
- College: Virginia (2017–2021)
- NBA draft: 2021: undrafted
- Playing career: 2021–present

Career history
- 2021–2022: Los Angeles Lakers
- 2021–2022: →South Bay Lakers
- 2022–2023: South Bay Lakers
- 2023: Washington Wizards
- 2023: →Capital City Go-Go
- 2023–2024: Denver Nuggets
- 2023–2024: →Grand Rapids Gold
- 2024–2025: Memphis Grizzlies
- 2024–2025: →Memphis Hustle
- 2025–present: Indiana Pacers

Career highlights
- NBA G League Defensive Player of the Year (2023); All-NBA G League First Team (2023); NBA G League All-Defensive Team (2023); NBA G League blocks leader (2023); NCAA champion (2019); Second-team All-ACC (2021); ACC All-Defensive Team (2021)
- Stats at NBA.com
- Stats at Basketball Reference

James Matthew Huff (born August 25, 1997) is an American professional basketball player for the Indiana Pacers of the National Basketball Association (NBA). He played college basketball for the Virginia Cavaliers.

== High school career ==
Huff was a four-year varsity basketball player for Voyager Academy in Durham, North Carolina, where he was coached by his father, Mike. On January 21, 2016, as a senior, he became his school's all-time leading scorer. Huff led his team to the Class 1A state title, earning most valuable player honors after recording a triple-double of 14 points, 14 rebounds and 10 blocks in the final. He finished the season averaging 16.3 points, 10.1 rebounds and 5.5 assists per game. A four-star recruit, Huff committed to play college basketball for Virginia.

== College career ==
Huff redshirted his first year to improve his strength and weight. He gained about 30 pounds (14 kg) by the time his redshirt freshman season began. Huff averaged 3.4 points and 1.9 rebounds per game as a freshman. On April 4, 2018, after his freshman season, it was announced that Huff would miss three to four months after undergoing surgery for a torn labrum. As a sophomore, he averaged 4.4 points and 2.1 rebounds in 9.3 minutes per game on the national champion team. On January 18, 2020, Huff scored 17 points and six blocks in a 63–58 win over Georgia Tech. On February 29, Huff recorded 15 points, 10 blocks and nine rebounds in a 52–50 win over Duke. He joined Ralph Sampson as the only players in program history with at least 10 blocks in a game. As a junior, Huff averaged 8.5 points, 6.2 rebounds and two blocks per game, all of which were career-highs. Following the season, he declared for the 2020 NBA draft. After evaluating his decision, he announced he would return to UVA for his senior season on August 1, 2020.

Following the 2020–21 season, Huff declared for the 2021 NBA draft.

== Professional career ==
=== Los Angeles / South Bay Lakers (2021–2023) ===
After going undrafted in the 2021 NBA draft, Huff joined the Washington Wizards for the 2021 NBA Summer League. On September 21, 2021, he signed with the Wizards, but was waived on October 13.

On October 18, 2021, Huff signed a two-way contract with the Los Angeles Lakers. On January 12, 2022, he was waived.

On January 16, 2022, Huff was re-acquired by the South Bay Lakers.

Huff joined the Los Angeles Lakers' 2022 NBA Summer League roster. In his Summer League debut for the Lakers, Huff scored nine points and seven rebounds in a 100–66 win against the Miami Heat.

On July 27, 2022, Huff signed an Exhibit 10 contract with the Los Angeles Lakers. He was waived on October 15, 2022. He subsequently re-joined South Bay.

=== Washington Wizards / Capital City Go-Go (2023) ===
On March 2, 2023, Huff signed a two-way contract with the Washington Wizards. On April 4, he was named NBA G League Defensive Player of the Year after leading the league with 4.0 blocks per game.

On July 3, 2023, Huff joined the Houston Rockets Summer League team.

=== Denver Nuggets / Grand Rapids Gold (2023–2024) ===
On July 18, 2023, Huff signed a two-way contract with the Denver Nuggets.

=== Memphis Grizzlies (2024–2025) ===
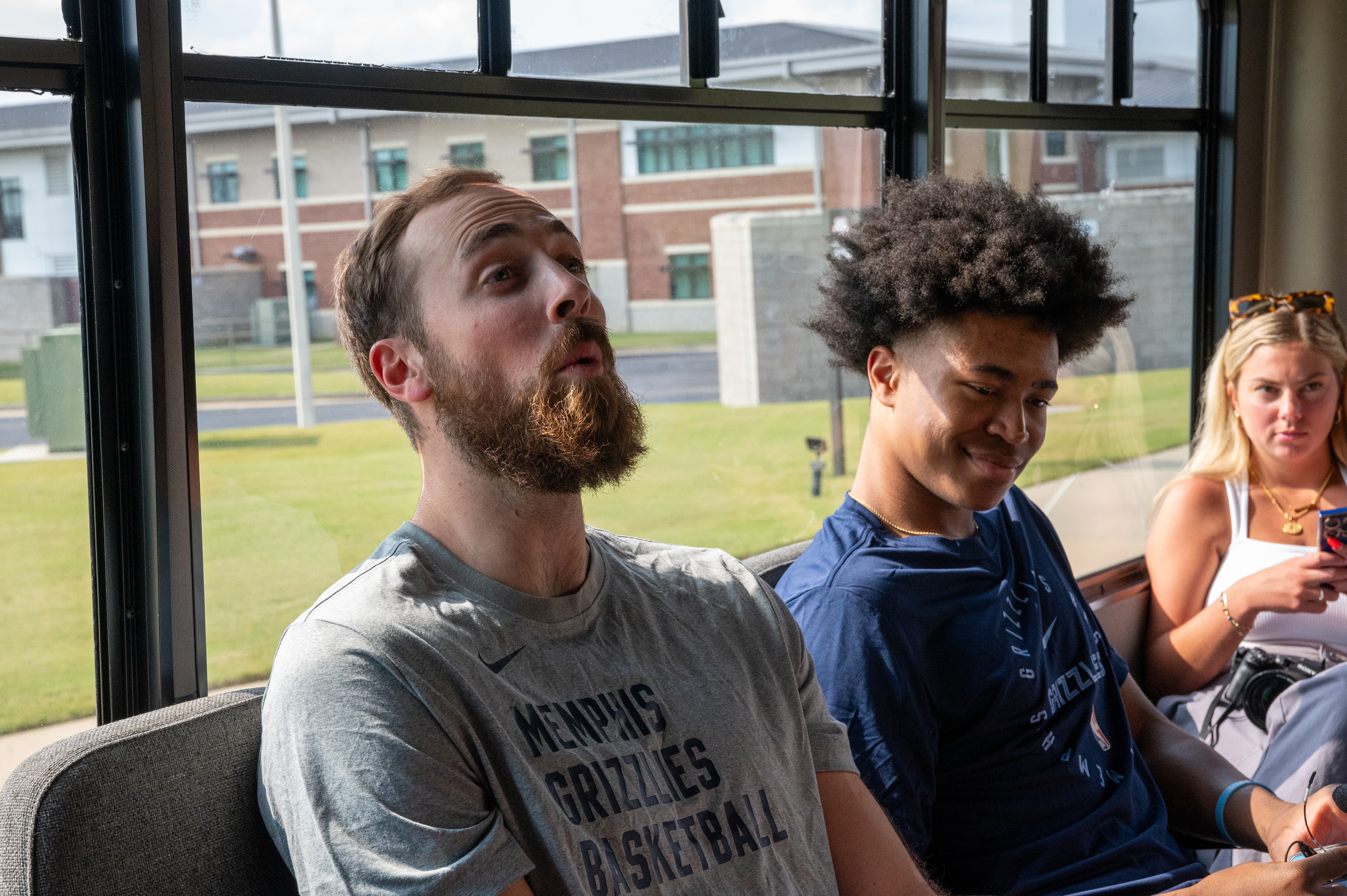
Huff (left) with Memphis Grizzlies rookie Jaylen Wells at Memphis Air National Guard Base in 2024

On July 24, 2024, Huff signed a two-way contract with the Memphis Grizzlies. On October 26, he scored a career high eighteen points in a home victory against the Orlando Magic and two days later, he signed a four-year, $10.1 million contract with the Grizzlies. Huff made 64 appearances (two starts) for Memphis during the 2024–25 NBA season, averaging 6.9 points, 2.0 rebounds, and 0.6 assists.

=== Indiana Pacers (2025–present) ===
On July 6, 2025, Huff was traded to the Indiana Pacers in exchange for a 2029 second-round pick and a 2031 second-round pick swap. On November 19, Huff scored 20 points, five rebounds, and four assists against the Charlotte Hornets. On January 16, 2026, Huff scored a career-high 29 points and grabbed nine rebounds against the New Orleans Pelicans. In the 2025-2026 season, Huff played in all 82 games and had the third highest blocks per game in the league, recording averages of 9.5 points, 4.0 rebounds, 1.5 assists, and 1.9 blocks.

== Career statistics ==
Legend
GP	Games played	GS	Games started	MPG	Minutes per game
FG%	Field goal percentage	3P%	3-point field goal percentage	FT%	Free throw percentage
RPG	Rebounds per game	APG	Assists per game	SPG	Steals per game
BPG	Blocks per game	PPG	Points per game	**Bold**	Career high
*	Led the league

=== NBA ===
==== Regular season ====
Year	Team	GP	GS	MPG	FG%	3P%	FT%	RPG	APG	SPG	BPG	PPG
2021–22	L.A. Lakers	4	0	5.1	.000	.000	—	1.0	.3	.3	.3	0
2022–23	Washington	7	0	13.6	**.600**	**.500**	.938	3.0	1.4	.4	.6	7.3
2023–24	Denver	20	0	2.5	**.600**	.333	**1.000**	.6	.1	.1	.2	1.2
2024–25	Memphis	64	2	11.7	.515	.405	.786	2.0	.6	.3	.9	6.9
2025–26	Indiana	**82***	**47**	**21.0**	.476	.319	.828	**4.0**	**1.5**	**.5**	**1.9**	**9.5**
Career		177	49	14.9	.492	.351	.827	2.8	1.0	.4	1.2	7.3

==== Playoffs ====
Year	Team	GP	GS	MPG	FG%	3P%	FT%	RPG	APG	SPG	BPG	PPG
2025	Memphis	2	0	9.0	.500	.000	1.000	1.5	.5	.0	1.5	4.0
Career		2	0	9.0	.500	.000	1.000	1.5	.5	.0	1.5	4.0

=== College ===
Year	Team	GP	GS	MPG	FG%	3P%	FT%	RPG	APG	SPG	BPG	PPG
2016–17	Virginia	Redshirt										
2017–18	Virginia	12	0	8.8	**.680**	.286	.625	1.9	.3	.1	1.2	3.4
2018–19	Virginia	**34**	0	9.3	.604	**.452**	.667	2.1	.2	.2	.7	4.4
2019–20	Virginia	30	18	25.0	.571	.358	.540	6.2	.8	.4	2.0	8.5
2020–21	Virginia	25	**25**	**27.0**	.585	.387	**.837**	**7.1**	**1.0**	**.5**	**2.6**	**13.0**
Career		101	43	18.3	.588	.386	.679	4.5	.6	.3	1.6	7.6

== Personal life ==
Both of Huff's parents are former college basketball players. His father, Mike, played for Pacific Lutheran University, and his mother, Kathy, played for West Virginia. Mike was the director of the Michael W. Krzyzewski Human Performance Laboratory at Duke University.

Huff is a member of the Chi Alpha Christian fellowship at the University of Virginia and aspires to become a minister when he retires from basketball.
