= 2025–26 Indiana Pacers season =

2025–26 NBA season by team

- Head coach: Rick Carlisle
- President: Kevin Pritchard
- General manager: Chad Buchanan
- Owner: Herbert Simon
- Arena: Gainbridge Fieldhouse

Results
- Record: 19–63 (.232)
- Place: Division: 5th (Central); Conference: 14th (Eastern)
- Playoff finish: Did not qualify
- Stats at Basketball Reference

Local media
- Television: FanDuel Sports Network Indiana; WTHR/WALV-CD (11 simulcasts)
- Radio: 1070 The Fan

The 2025–26 Indiana Pacers season was the 59th season of the franchise and the 50th season in the National Basketball Association (NBA). The team entered the season as the defending Eastern Conference champions. The full-year absence of Tyrese Haliburton, who was sidelined with a torn Achilles tendon sustained in Game 7 of the 2025 NBA Finals, along with a handful of other injuries caused catastrophe upon the Pacers' chances in their post-NBA Finals season.

With a loss to the Detroit Pistons on January 17, the Pacers were not able to improve on their 50–32 record from their previous season, with just a 10–33 record following that loss. Aside from Haliburton being out for the year, key players in Aaron Nesmith, Obi Toppin and Ben Sheppard amongst others all missed significant time due to injuries which plagued Indiana's record. On February 5, Indiana traded Bennedict Mathurin, Isaiah Jackson, two first-round picks and a second-round pick to the Los Angeles Clippers for Ivica Zubac and Kobe Brown. The Pacers' 2026 first-round pick was later conveyed to the Clippers after it landed outside the Top 4 following the 2026 NBA draft lottery.

The Pacers recorded the two longest losing streaks in franchise history during this season: a 13-game streak from December 2025 to January 2026 and a 16-game streak from February 2026 to March 2026. With a loss to the Sacramento Kings on March 10, the Pacers were the first team eliminated from the 2026 NBA playoffs, which is the first time since the 2022–23 season. Indiana would finish the season with a record of 19–63, the worst in franchise history.

== Draft ==
Round	Pick	Player	Position(s)	Nationality	College
2	54	Taelon Peter	Point Guard	United States	Liberty

The Pacers entered the draft holding only one second-round pick. A few days earlier, they had traded their first-round pick, which landed 23rd overall, to the New Orleans Pelicans.

== Roster ==
2025–26 Indiana Pacers roster
Players

Pos.	No.	Player	Height	Weight	DOB	From
F	24	Kobe Brown	6 ft 7 in (2.01 m)	250 lb (113 kg)	2000-01-01	Missouri
G	12	Johnny Furphy (injured)	6 ft 8 in (2.03 m)	200 lb (91 kg)	2004-12-08	Kansas
G	0	Tyrese Haliburton (injured)	6 ft 5 in (1.96 m)	185 lb (84 kg)	2000-02-29	Iowa State
C	32	Jay Huff	7 ft 1 in (2.16 m)	240 lb (109 kg)	1997-08-25	Virginia
G	29	Quenton Jackson	6 ft 4 in (1.93 m)	173 lb (78 kg)	1998-09-15	Texas A&M
G	7	Kam Jones	6 ft 4 in (1.93 m)	200 lb (91 kg)	2002-02-25	Marquette
G	9	T. J. McConnell	6 ft 1 in (1.85 m)	190 lb (86 kg)	1992-03-25	Arizona
G	2	Andrew Nembhard	6 ft 4 in (1.93 m)	191 lb (87 kg)	2000-01-16	Gonzaga
G/F	23	Aaron Nesmith	6 ft 5 in (1.96 m)	215 lb (98 kg)	1999-10-16	Vanderbilt
G	4	Taelon Peter (TW)	6 ft 3 in (1.91 m)	185 lb (84 kg)	2002-02-27	Liberty
C	11	Micah Potter	6 ft 9 in (2.06 m)	248 lb (112 kg)	1998-04-06	Wisconsin
G	26	Ben Sheppard	6 ft 6 in (1.98 m)	190 lb (86 kg)	2001-07-16	Belmont
F	43	Pascal Siakam	6 ft 8 in (2.03 m)	245 lb (111 kg)	1994-04-02	New Mexico State
F	18	Jalen Slawson (TW)	6 ft 7 in (2.01 m)	225 lb (102 kg)	1999-10-22	Furman
G	55	Ethan Thompson (TW)	6 ft 4 in (1.93 m)	195 lb (88 kg)	1999-05-04	Oregon State
F	1	Obi Toppin	6 ft 9 in (2.06 m)	220 lb (100 kg)	1998-03-04	Dayton
F	5	Jarace Walker	6 ft 7 in (2.01 m)	235 lb (107 kg)	2003-09-04	Houston
C	40	Ivica Zubac	7 ft 0 in (2.13 m)	240 lb (109 kg)	1997-03-18	Croatia

Coaches
Head coach
- Rick Carlisle
Assistant(s)
- Maurice Baker
- Jenny Boucek
- Jim Boylen
- Johnny Carpenter
- Jannero Pargo
- Lloyd Pierce
- Isaac Yacob

Legend
- (DP) Unsigned draft pick
- (FA) Free agent
- (S) Suspended
- (GL) On assignment to G League affiliate
- (TW) Two-way affiliate player
- Injured

Roster
Updated: February 6, 2026

== Standings ==
=== Division ===
Central Division	W	L	PCT	GB	Home	Road	Div	GP
c – Detroit Pistons	60	22	.732	–	32‍–‍9	28‍–‍13	12‍–‍4	82
x – Cleveland Cavaliers	52	30	.634	8.0	27‍–‍14	25‍–‍16	10‍–‍5	82
Milwaukee Bucks	32	50	.390	28.0	19‍–‍22	13‍–‍28	9‍–‍7	82
Chicago Bulls	31	51	.378	29.0	18‍–‍23	13‍–‍28	4‍–‍12	82
Indiana Pacers	19	63	.232	41.0	11‍–‍29	8‍–‍34	4‍–‍12	82

=== Conference ===
Eastern Conference
#	Team	W	L	PCT	GB	GP
1	c – Detroit Pistons *	60	22	.732	–	82
2	y – Boston Celtics *	56	26	.683	4.0	82
3	x – New York Knicks	53	29	.646	7.0	82
4	x – Cleveland Cavaliers	52	30	.634	8.0	82
5	x – Toronto Raptors	46	36	.561	14.0	82
6	y – Atlanta Hawks *	46	36	.561	14.0	82
7	x – Philadelphia 76ers	45	37	.549	15.0	82
8	x – Orlando Magic	45	37	.549	15.0	82
9	pi – Charlotte Hornets	44	38	.537	16.0	82
10	pi – Miami Heat	43	39	.524	17.0	82
11	Milwaukee Bucks	32	50	.390	28.0	82
12	Chicago Bulls	31	51	.378	29.0	82
13	Brooklyn Nets	20	62	.244	40.0	82
14	Indiana Pacers	19	63	.232	41.0	82
15	Washington Wizards	17	65	.207	43.0	82

== Game log ==
=== Preseason ===
2025 preseason game log
Total: 2–2 (Home: 1–1; Road: 1–1)
Preseason: 2–2 (home: 1–1; road: 1–1)

Game	Date	Team	Score	High points	High rebounds	High assists	Location Attendance	Record
1	October 7	@ Minnesota	W 135–134 (OT)	RayJ Dennis (16)	McGlothan, Peter, Walker (5)	RayJ Dennis (5)	Target Center; 0	1–0
2	October 11	Oklahoma City	W 116–101	Taelon Peter (18)	Slawson, Walker (8)	Jarace Walker (7)	Gainbridge Fieldhouse; 11,311	2–0
3	October 13	San Antonio	L 108–124	Bennedict Mathurin (31)	Bradley, Mathurin, Nesmith, Toppin (4)	Andrew Nembhard (8)	Gainbridge Fieldhouse; 10,008	2–1
4	October 17	@ San Antonio	L 104–133	Aaron Nesmith (12)	Huff, Peter (5)	Andrew Nembhard (5)	Frost Bank Center; 18,354	2–2

2025–26 preseason schedule

=== Regular season ===
2025–26 game log
Total: 19–63 (Home: 11–30; Road: 8–33)
October: 0–5 (home: 0–2; road: 0–3)

Game	Date	Team	Score	High points	High rebounds	High assists	Location Attendance	Record
1	October 23	Oklahoma City	L 135–141 (2OT)	Bennedict Mathurin (36)	Pascal Siakam (15)	Nembhard, Sheppard, Siakam, Walker (4)	Gainbridge Fieldhouse; 17,274	0–1
2	October 25	@ Memphis	L 103–128	Bennedict Mathurin (26)	Obi Toppin (9)	Pascal Siakam (6)	FedEx Forum; 15,441	0–2
3	October 26	@ Minnesota	L 110–114	Pascal Siakam (33)	Pascal Siakam (10)	Pascal Siakam (8)	Target Arena; 18,978	0–3
4	October 29	@ Dallas	L 105–107	Pascal Siakam (27)	Pascal Siakam (13)	Dennis, Walker (5)	American Airlines Center; 19,141	0–4
5	October 31	Atlanta	L 108–128	Pascal Siakam (18)	Isaiah Jackson (11)	Dennis, Siakam (5)	Gainbridge Fieldhouse; 16,212	0–5

November: 4–11 (home: 4–4; road: 0–7)

Game	Date	Team	Score	High points	High rebounds	High assists	Location Attendance	Record
6	November 1	Golden State	W 114–109	Aaron Nesmith (31)	Jarace Walker (9)	Quenton Jackson (10)	Gainbridge Fieldhouse; 17,274	1–5
7	November 3	Milwaukee	L 115–117	Pascal Siakam (32)	Isaiah Jackson (10)	Pascal Siakam (8)	Gainbridge Fieldhouse; 17,016	1–6
8	November 5	Brooklyn	L 103–112	Pascal Siakam (23)	Jeremiah Robinson-Earl (15)	Pascal Siakam (9)	Gainbridge Fieldhouse; 16,103	1–7
9	November 8	@ Denver	L 100–117	Aaron Nesmith (25)	Jay Huff (7)	Andrew Nembhard (6)	Ball Arena; 19,954	1–8
10	November 9	@ Golden State	L 83–114	Andrew Nembhard (14)	Jay Huff (11)	Andrew Nembhard (9)	Chase Center; 18,064	1–9
11	November 11	@ Utah	L 128–152	Pascal Siakam (27)	Isaiah Jackson (10)	Nembhard, Nesmith (7)	Delta Center; 18,186	1–10
12	November 13	@ Phoenix	L 98–133	Andrew Nembhard (21)	Jeremiah Robinson-Earl (7)	Andrew Nembhard (9)	Mortgage Matchup Center; 17,071	1–11
13	November 15	Toronto	L 111–129	Pascal Siakam (30)	Jarace Walker (8)	Andrew Nembhard (5)	Gainbridge Fieldhouse; 17,274	1–12
14	November 17	@ Detroit	L 112–127	Pascal Siakam (29)	Isaiah Jackson (10)	Nembhard, Sheppard (4)	Little Caesars Arena; 19,058	1–13
15	November 19	Charlotte	W 127–118	Bennedict Mathurin (24)	Bennedict Mathurin (12)	T.J. McConnell (8)	Gainbridge Fieldhouse; 17,003	2–13
16	November 21	@ Cleveland	L 109–120	Andrew Nembhard (32)	Pascal Siakam (9)	Andrew Nembhard (8)	Rocket Arena; 19,432	2–14
17	November 24	Detroit	L 117–122	Pascal Siakam (24)	Pascal Siakam (8)	Andrew Nembhard (6)	Gainbridge Fieldhouse; 17,009	2–15
18	November 26	@ Toronto	L 95–97	T.J. McConnell (16)	Jarace Walker (9)	T.J. McConnell (6)	Scotiabank Arena; 18,484	2–16
19	November 28	Washington	W 119–86	Pascal Siakam (24)	Robinson-Earl, Siakam (11)	T.J. McConnell (8)	Gainbridge Fieldhouse; 16,515	3–16
20	November 29	Chicago	W 103–101	Pascal Siakam (24)	Isaiah Jackson (11)	McConnell, Nembhard (6)	Gainbridge Fieldhouse; 17,006	4–16

December: 2–12 (home: 1–7; road: 1–5)

Game	Date	Team	Score	High points	High rebounds	High assists	Location Attendance	Record
21	December 1	Cleveland	L 119–135	Pascal Siakam (26)	Pascal Siakam (7)	Andrew Nembhard (6)	Gainbridge Fieldhouse; 15,470	4–17
22	December 3	Denver	L 120–135	Pascal Siakam (23)	Bennedict Mathurin (7)	Andrew Nembhard (7)	Gainbridge Fieldhouse; 15,578	4–18
23	December 5	@ Chicago	W 120–105	Pascal Siakam (36)	Pascal Siakam (9)	Andrew Nembhard (7)	United Center; 20,471	5–18
24	December 8	Sacramento	W 116–105	Andrew Nembhard (28)	Huff, Jackson (7)	Andrew Nembhard (12)	Gainbridge Fieldhouse; 16,465	6–18
25	December 12	@ Philadelphia	L 105–115	Pascal Siakam (20)	Isaiah Jackson (9)	Andrew Nembhard (7)	Xfinity Mobile Arena; 19,746	6–19
26	December 14	Washington	L 89–108	Bennedict Mathurin (15)	Isaiah Jackson (12)	Andrew Nembhard (6)	Gainbridge Fieldhouse; 16,001	6–20
27	December 18	New York	L 113–114	Andrew Nembhard (31)	Huff, Jackson (10)	McConnell, Siakam (5)	Gainbridge Fieldhouse; 15,660	6–21
28	December 20	@ New Orleans	L 109–128	Pascal Siakam (22)	Jay Huff (6)	T. J. McConnell (8)	Smoothie King Center; 16,434	6–22
29	December 22	@ Boston	L 95–103	Pascal Siakam (25)	Bennedict Mathurin (9)	Andrew Nembhard (7)	TD Garden; 19,156	6–23
30	December 23	Milwaukee	L 94–111	T. J. McConnell (16)	Pascal Siakam (9)	McConnell, Nembhard (6)	Gainbridge Fieldhouse; 16,509	6–24
31	December 26	Boston	L 122–140	Andrew Nembhard (18)	Pascal Siakam (6)	Andrew Nembhard (8)	Gainbridge Fieldhouse; 17,004	6–25
32	December 27	@ Miami	L 116–142	Pascal Siakam (33)	Furphy, Siakam (7)	Andrew Nembhard (16)	Kaseya Center; 19,715	6–26
33	December 29	@ Houston	L 119–126	Pascal Siakam (23)	Tied (4)	Micah Potter (6)	Toyota Center; 18,055	6–27
34	December 31	Orlando	L 110–112	Pascal Siakam (26)	Aaron Nesmith (10)	T. J. McConnell (8)	Gainbridge Fieldhouse; 16,504	6–28

January: 7–8 (home: 5–3; road: 2–5)

Game	Date	Team	Score	High points	High rebounds	High assists	Location Attendance	Record
35	January 2	San Antonio	L 113–123	Pascal Siakam (23)	Pascal Siakam (9)	Andrew Nembhard (6)	Gainbridge Fieldhouse; 17,013	6–29
36	January 4	@ Orlando	L 127–135	Pascal Siakam (34)	Micah Potter (10)	Andrew Nembhard (11)	Kia Center; 19,382	6–30
37	January 6	Cleveland	L 116–120	Pascal Siakam (22)	Johnny Furphy (11)	Andrew Nembhard (11)	Gainbridge Fieldhouse; 16,007	6–31
38	January 8	@ Charlotte	W 114–112	Pascal Siakam (30)	Pascal Siakam (14)	T. J. McConnell (8)	Spectrum Center; 17,342	7–31
39	January 10	Miami	W 123–99	Andrew Nembhard (29)	Nesmith, Walker (9)	Andrew Nembhard (9)	Gainbridge Fieldhouse; 17,274	8–31
40	January 12	Boston	W 98–96	Pascal Siakam (21)	Pascal Siakam (8)	Andrew Nembhard (9)	Gainbridge Fieldhouse; 15,650	9–31
41	January 14	Toronto	L 101–115	Pascal Siakam (26)	Furphy, Siakam (10)	McConnell, Nembhard (6)	Gainbridge Fieldhouse; 15,789	9–32
42	January 16	New Orleans	W 127–119	Jay Huff (29)	Bradley, Huff (9)	Andrew Nembhard (10)	Gainbridge Fieldhouse; 16,753	10–32
43	January 17	@ Detroit	L 78–121	Jarace Walker (13)	Micah Potter (9)	Micah Potter (5)	Little Caesars Arena; 20,062	10–33
44	January 19	@ Philadelphia	L 104–113	Andrew Nembhard (25)	Aaron Nesmith (11)	Pascal Siakam (7)	Xfinity Mobile Arena; 18,005	10–34
45	January 21	@ Boston	L 104–119	Pascal Siakam (32)	Pascal Siakam (10)	Andrew Nembhard (9)	TD Garden; 19,156	10–35
46	January 23	@ Oklahoma City	W 117–114	Andrew Nembhard (27)	Furphy, Potter (10)	Andrew Nembhard (11)	Paycom Center; 18,203	11–35
47	January 26	@ Atlanta	L 116–132	Pascal Siakam (26)	Pascal Siakam (9)	Andrew Nembhard (13)	State Farm Arena; 12,210	11–36
48	January 28	Chicago	W 113–110	Pascal Siakam (20)	Bennedict Mathurin (8)	Andrew Nembhard (9)	Gainbridge Fieldhouse; 16,777	12–36
49	January 31	Atlanta	W 129–124	Andrew Nembhard (26)	Jarace Walker (10)	Andrew Nembhard (10)	Gainbridge Fieldhouse; 17,010	13–36

February: 2–9 (home: 0–5; road: 2–4)

Game	Date	Team	Score	High points	High rebounds	High assists	Location Attendance	Record
50	February 2	Houston	L 114–118	Pascal Siakam (27)	I. Jackson, Nesmith (6)	Andrew Nembhard (8)	Gainbridge Fieldhouse; 16,511	13–37
51	February 3	Utah	L 122–131	Q. Jackson, Walker (24)	Isaiah Jackson (10)	Kam Jones (8)	Gainbridge Fieldhouse; 16,678	13–38
52	February 6	@ Milwaukee	L 99–105	Andrew Nembhard (22)	Jarace Walker (9)	Andrew Nembhard (8)	Fiserv Forum; 17,341	13–39
53	February 8	@ Toronto	L 104–122	Pascal Siakam (18)	Micah Potter (8)	T. J. McConnell (7)	Scotiabank Arena; 17,876	13–40
54	February 10	@ New York	W 137–134 (OT)	Pascal Siakam (30)	Aaron Nesmith (8)	Andrew Nembhard (10)	Madison Square Garden; 19,812	14–40
55	February 11	@ Brooklyn	W 115–110	Jarace Walker (23)	Micah Potter (12)	Kam Jones (6)	Barclays Center; 16,779	15–40
All-Star Game
56	February 19	@ Washington	L 105–112	Jarace Walker (19)	Jarace Walker (14)	Jarace Walker (7)	Capital One Arena; 14,602	15–41
57	February 20	@ Washington	L 118–131	Jay Huff (22)	Jarace Walker (12)	Kam Jones (11)	Capital One Arena; 15,846	15–42
58	February 22	Dallas	L 130–134	Pascal Siakam (30)	Jarace Walker (9)	Andrew Nembhard (11)	Gainbridge Fieldhouse; 17,274	15–43
59	February 24	Philadelphia	L 114–135	Nembhard, Potter (23)	Brown, Walker (10)	Jarace Walker (6)	Gainbridge Fieldhouse; 16,540	15–44
60	February 26	Charlotte	L 109–133	Andrew Nembhard (20)	Jarace Walker (6)	McConnell, Nembhard (7)	Gainbridge Fieldhouse; 17,073	15–45

March: 2–13 (home: 1–6; road: 1–7)

Game	Date	Team	Score	High points	High rebounds	High assists	Location Attendance	Record
61	March 1	Memphis	L 106–125	Jarace Walker (21)	Micah Potter (9)	Kam Jones (10)	Gainbridge Fieldhouse; 16,695	15–46
62	March 4	@ L. A. Clippers	L 107–130	Pascal Siakam (29)	Micah Potter (6)	Tied (5)	Intuit Dome; 17,093	15–47
63	March 6	@ L. A. Lakers	L 117–128	Pascal Siakam (26)	Jarace Walker (9)	Andrew Nembhard (8)	Crypto.com Arena; 18,173	15–48
64	March 8	@ Portland	L 111–131	Pascal Siakam (22)	Tied (6)	Andrew Nembhard (9)	Moda Center; 16,833	15–49
65	March 10	@ Sacramento	L 109–114	Aaron Nesmith (29)	Jarace Walker (9)	Kam Jones (9)	Golden 1 Center; 14,618	15–50
66	March 12	Phoenix	L 108–123	Andrew Nembhard (23)	Jalen Slawson (8)	Kam Jones (6)	Gainbridge Fieldhouse; 16,470	15–51
67	March 13	New York	L 92–101	Jarace Walker (18)	Jarace Walker (9)	Andrew Nembhard (7)	Gainbridge Fieldhouse; 15,544	15–52
68	March 15	@ Milwaukee	L 123–134	Aaron Nesmith (32)	Jarace Walker (8)	T. J. McConnell (11)	Fiserv Forum; 15,898	15–53
69	March 17	@ New York	L 110–136	Jarace Walker (16)	Ivica Zubac (7)	T. J. McConnell (10)	Madison Square Garden; 19,812	15–54
70	March 18	Portland	L 119–127	Ivica Zubac (18)	Ivica Zubac (8)	T. J. McConnell (10)	Gainbridge Fieldhouse; 17,274	15–55
71	March 21	@ San Antonio	L 119–134	Andrew Nembhard (25)	Tied (4)	T. J. McConnell (8)	Frost Bank Center; 18,811	15–56
72	March 23	@ Orlando	W 128–126	Pascal Siakam (37)	Andrew Nembhard (7)	Andrew Nembhard (14)	Kia Center; 17,721	16–56
73	March 25	L. A. Lakers	L 130–137	Pascal Siakam (20)	Pascal Siakam (8)	Andrew Nembhard (19)	Gainbridge Fieldhouse; 17,274	16–57
74	March 27	L. A. Clippers	L 113–114	Aaron Nesmith (26)	Obi Toppin (8)	Andrew Nembhard (10)	Gainbridge Fieldhouse; 16,645	16–58
75	March 29	Miami	W 135–118	Pascal Siakam (30)	Pascal Siakam (11)	Andrew Nembhard (10)	Gainbridge Fieldhouse; 16,771	17–58

April: 2–5 (home: 0–3; road: 2–2)

Game	Date	Team	Score	High points	High rebounds	High assists	Location Attendance	Record
76	April 1	@ Chicago	W 145–126	Pascal Siakam (25)	Brown, Slawson (8)	Kam Jones (7)	United Center; 21,312	18–58
77	April 3	@ Charlotte	L 108–129	Pascal Siakam (30)	Kobe Brown (9)	Kam Jones (10)	Spectrum Center; 19,579	18–59
78	April 5	@ Cleveland	L 108–117	Potter, Toppin (21)	Micah Potter (12)	Brown, Jones (5)	Rocket Arena; 19,432	18–60
79	April 7	Minnesota	L 104–124	Ethan Thompson (17)	Jarace Walker (6)	Jarace Walker (5)	Gainbridge Fieldhouse; 17,274	18–61
80	April 9	@ Brooklyn	W 123–94	Obi Toppin (26)	Micah Potter (14)	Jarace Walker (8)	Barclays Center; 17,548	19–61
81	April 10	Philadelphia	L 94–105	Jarace Walker (17)	Huff, Potter (10)	Quenton Jackson (6)	Gainbridge Fieldhouse; 17,274	19–62
82	April 12	Detroit	L 121–133	Jackson, Toppin (21)	Micah Potter (11)	Quenton Jackson (8)	Gainbridge Fieldhouse; 16,840	19–63

2025–26 season schedule

=== NBA Cup ===
==== East Group A ====
Pos	Team	Pld	W	L	PF	PA	PD	Qualification
1	Toronto Raptors	4	4	0	458	403	+55	Advanced to knockout rounds
2	Atlanta Hawks	4	2	2	468	472	−4	
3	Cleveland Cavaliers	4	2	2	492	466	+26	
4	Indiana Pacers	4	1	3	431	431	0	
5	Washington Wizards	4	1	3	443	520	−77	

Source: NBA

2025–26 game log
Total: 1–3 (Home: 1–1; Road: 0–2)
NBA Cup: 1–3 (home: 1–1; road: 0–2)

Game	Date	Team	Score	High points	High rebounds	High assists	Location Attendance	Record
1	October 31	Atlanta	L 108–128	Pascal Siakam (18)	Isaiah Jackson (11)	Dennis, Siakam (5)	Gainbridge Fieldhouse; 16,212	0–1
2	November 21	@ Cleveland	L 109–120	Andrew Nembhard (32)	Pascal Siakam (9)	Andrew Nembhard (8)	Rocket Arena; 19,432	0–2
3	November 26	@ Toronto	L 95–97	T. J. McConnell (16)	Jarace Walker (9)	T.J. McConnell (6)	Scotiabank Arena; 18,484	0–3
4	November 28	Washington	W 119–86	Pascal Siakam (24)	Robinson-Earl, Siakam (11)	T.J. McConnell (8)	Gainbridge Fieldhouse; 16,515	1–3

== Player statistics ==
=== Regular season ===
Player	POS	GP	GS	MP	REB	AST	STL	BLK	PTS	MPG	RPG	APG	SPG	BPG	PPG
Jay Huff	C	82	47	1,719	324	121	41	153	783	21.0	4.0	1.5	.5	1.9	9.5
Jarace Walker	PF	76	41	1,953	391	192	63	26	884	25.7	5.1	2.5	.8	.3	11.6
Ben Sheppard	SG	65	20	1,390	195	114	39	6	459	21.4	3.0	1.8	.6	.1	7.1
Pascal Siakam	PF	62	62	2,057	411	236	69	25	1,458	33.2	6.6	3.8	1.1	.4	24.0
Andrew Nembhard	PG	57	57	1,786	160	437	51	8	966	31.3	2.8	7.7	.9	.1	16.9
T. J. McConnell	PG	56	4	963	124	287	56	10	525	17.2	2.2	5.1	1.0	.2	9.4
Quenton Jackson	PG	49	19	897	114	140	31	6	448	18.3	2.3	2.9	.6	.1	9.1
Micah Potter	C	47	7	908	233	69	22	15	458	19.3	5.0	1.5	.5	.3	9.7
Aaron Nesmith	SF	45	42	1,335	187	86	26	23	621	29.7	4.2	1.9	.6	.5	13.8
Tony Bradley^{†}	C	38	3	416	107	20	6	7	151	10.9	2.8	.5	.2	.2	4.0
Isaiah Jackson^{†}	C	38	14	638	211	31	26	29	243	16.8	5.6	.8	.7	.8	6.4
Taelon Peter	SG	38	0	492	59	40	26	4	171	12.9	1.6	1.1	.7	.1	4.5
Kam Jones	SG	37	7	616	60	119	18	0	162	16.6	1.6	3.2	.5	.0	4.4
Johnny Furphy	SG	35	21	643	153	41	20	7	180	18.4	4.4	1.2	.6	.2	5.1
Ethan Thompson	SG	32	13	653	69	57	20	9	223	20.4	2.2	1.8	.6	.3	7.0
Bennedict Mathurin^{†}	SF	28	24	891	151	63	17	4	497	31.8	5.4	2.3	.6	.1	17.8
Kobe Brown^{†}	PF	27	10	668	132	53	14	10	253	24.7	4.9	2.0	.5	.4	9.4
Obi Toppin	PF	24	3	424	106	55	12	1	279	17.7	4.4	2.3	.5	.0	11.6
Jeremiah Robinson-Earl^{†}	PF	17	3	300	18	12	7	1	79	17.6	5.2	.7	.4	.1	4.6
Garrison Mathews	SG	15	1	196	17	10	6	3	78	13.1	1.1	.7	.4	.2	5.2
RayJ Dennis^{†}	PG	13	0	168	21	26	3	4	64	12.9	1.6	2.0	.2	.3	4.9
Jalen Slawson	SF	13	6	311	57	36	20	14	95	23.9	4.4	2.8	1.5	1.1	7.3
Monté Morris	PG	6	0	65	7	9	1	1	18	10.8	1.2	1.5	.2	.2	3.0
Ivica Zubac^{†}	C	5	5	118	36	9	2	4	58	23.6	7.2	1.8	.4	.8	11.6
Cody Martin	SF	4	0	55	14	2	4	2	7	13.8	3.5	.5	1.0	.5	1.8
James Wiseman	C	4	1	58	8	3	0	1	13	14.5	2.0	.8	.0	.3	3.3
Mac McClung^{†}	SG	3	0	34	4	1	5	1	19	11.3	1.3	.3	1.7	.3	6.3

- ^{†} Denotes player spent time with another team in the season. Stats reflect time with the Pacers only.

== Transactions ==
=== Trades ===
June 17, 2025	To Indiana Pacers 2026 IND first-round pick	To New Orleans Pelicans 2025 IND first-round pick (No. 23); Draft rights to Mojave King (2023 No. 47)
February 5, 2026	To Indiana Pacers Ivica Zubac; Kobe Brown	To Los Angeles Clippers Bennedict Mathurin; Isaiah Jackson; 2026 IND conditional first-round pick 2028 DAL second-round pick 2029 IND first-round pick

=== Free agency ===
==== Re-signed ====
Date	Player	Ref.

==== Additions ====
Date	Player	Former Team	Ref.

==== Subtractions ====
Player	Reason	New Team	Ref.
