= Kobe Brown =

American basketball player (born 2000)

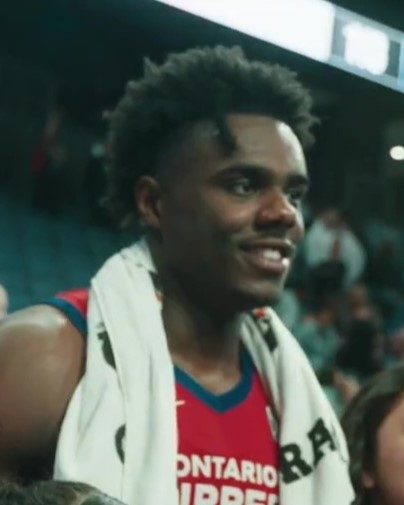
- Brown with the San Diego Clippers in 2024

No. 24 – Indiana Pacers
- Position: Small forward / power forward
- League: NBA

Personal information
- Born: January 1, 2000 (age 26) Huntsville, Alabama, U.S.
- Listed height: 6 ft 7 in (2.01 m)
- Listed weight: 250 lb (113 kg)

Career information
- High school: Lee (Huntsville, Alabama)
- College: Missouri (2019–2023)
- NBA draft: 2023: 1st round, 30th overall pick
- Drafted by: Los Angeles Clippers
- Playing career: 2023–present

Career history
- 2023–2026: Los Angeles Clippers
- 2023–2025: →Ontario / San Diego Clippers
- 2026–present: Indiana Pacers
- 2026–present: →Noblesville Boom

Career highlights
- First-team All-SEC (2023); Second-team All-SEC (2022)
- Stats at NBA.com
- Stats at Basketball Reference

Kobe Levose Brown (born January 1, 2000) is an American professional basketball player for the Indiana Pacers of the National Basketball Association (NBA), on a two-way contract with the Noblesville Boom of the NBA G League. He played college basketball for the Missouri Tigers. Brown was drafted at the end of the first round with the 30th pick by the Los Angeles Clippers.

== Early life and high school career ==
Brown grew up in Huntsville, Alabama and attended Lee High School. He averaged 20.9 points, 7.9 rebounds and 6.8 assists and was named first team All-State as a junior. Brown repeated as a first team All-State selection and was named the Huntsville Region Player of the Year after averaging 24.1 points, 12 rebounds and 8 assists per game during his senior season.

Brown was rated a four-star recruit and initially committed to play college basketball at Texas A&M during his junior year of high school. He decommitted as a senior and re-opened his recruitment. Brown ultimately signed to play at Missouri over offers from Minnesota, Penn State and Vanderbilt.

== College career ==
Brown played in all 30 of Missouri's games with 26 starts during his freshman season and averaged 5.8 points and 3.7 rebounds. He averaged eight points and 6.2 rebounds per game as a sophomore. Brown was named second-team All-Southeastern Conference (SEC) after leading Missouri with 12.5 points and 7.6 rebounds per game. He was a first-team All-SEC selection and the SEC Scholar-Athlete of the Year as a senior.

== Professional career ==
=== Los Angeles Clippers (2023–2026) ===
Brown was selected by the Los Angeles Clippers in the first round of the 2023 NBA draft with the 30th overall pick. The 2023 NBA Summer League boasted two players vying to be the second player to play in the NBA named Kobe (the other was Kobe Bufkin). Both were named after Kobe Bryant, although this is debated by Bufkin's family. Brown debuted in the Los Angeles Clippers' first game of the season on October 25 against Portland without scoring in five minutes and 18 seconds of play. Throughout his rookie and sophomore seasons, he has been assigned several times to the Ontario and San Diego Clippers. Brown made 44 appearances for Los Angeles during his rookie campaign, averaging 2.0 points, 1.4 rebounds, and 0.6 assists.

Brown played in 40 contests for the Clippers during the 2024–25 NBA season, recording averages of 1.9 points, 1.6 rebounds, and 0.6 assists. He made 34 appearances for Los Angeles in the 2025–26 season, averaging 2.9 points, 1.6 rebounds, and 0.8 assists.

=== Indiana Pacers (2026–present) ===
On February 5, 2026, Brown and Ivica Zubac were traded to the Indiana Pacers in exchange for Bennedict Mathurin, Isaiah Jackson, two first-round picks, and a second-round pick. He made 27 appearances (including 10 starts) for Indiana, recording averages of 9.4 points, 4.9 rebounds, and 2.0 assists.

On July 10, 2026, Brown re–signed with the Pacers on a two-way contract, splitting time with the G League's Noblesville Boom.

== Career statistics ==
Legend
GP	Games played	GS	Games started	MPG	Minutes per game
FG%	Field goal percentage	3P%	3-point field goal percentage	FT%	Free throw percentage
RPG	Rebounds per game	APG	Assists per game	SPG	Steals per game
BPG	Blocks per game	PPG	Points per game	**Bold**	Career high

=== NBA ===
==== Regular season ====
Year	Team	GP	GS	MPG	FG%	3P%	FT%	RPG	APG	SPG	BPG	PPG
2023–24	L.A. Clippers	**44**	0	9.0	.411	.292	.500	1.4	.6	.3	.1	2.0
2024–25	L.A. Clippers	40	0	6.8	.458	.231	.714	1.6	.6	.2	.1	1.9
2025–26	L.A. Clippers	34	0	8.7	.393	.265	**.808**	1.6	.8	.3	.1	2.9
2025–26	Indiana	27	**10**	**24.7**	**.503**	**.433**	.788	**4.9**	**2.0**	**.5**	**.4**	**9.4**
Career		145	10	11.2	.455	.338	.779	2.2	.9	.3	.2	3.6

==== Playoffs ====
Year	Team	GP	GS	MPG	FG%	3P%	FT%	RPG	APG	SPG	BPG	PPG
2024	L.A. Clippers	**3**	0	3.2	—	—	—	**.7**	.0	.0	.0	.0
2025	L.A. Clippers	**3**	0	**5.0**	.875	1.000	1.000	.3	**1.3**	.0	.0	**5.3**
Career		6	0	4.0	.875	1.000	1.000	.5	.7	.0	.0	2.7

=== College ===
Year	Team	GP	GS	MPG	FG%	3P%	FT%	RPG	APG	SPG	BPG	PPG
2019–20	Missouri	30	26	18.1	.401	.253	.744	3.7	.5	1.0	.4	5.8
2020–21	Missouri	26	26	21.3	.471	.250	.544	6.2	.8	.6	.4	8.0
2021–22	Missouri	33	32	**29.9**	.481	.206	**.795**	**7.6**	**2.5**	1.2	**.8**	12.5
2022–23	Missouri	**34**	**34**	29.6	**.553**	**.455**	.792	6.4	**2.5**	**1.5**	.4	**15.8**
Career		123	118	25.1	.492	.313	.747	6.0	1.7	1.1	.5	10.8

== Personal life ==
Brown's father, Greg Brown, was his coach at Lee High School and played collegiately at Athens State University. His younger brother, Kaleb, played basketball at Missouri and was his teammate for his final two seasons at the school.
