= Jalen Slawson =

American basketball player (born 1999)

No. 18 – Indiana Pacers
- Position: Small forward
- League: NBA

Personal information
- Born: October 22, 1999 (age 27) Charleston, South Carolina, U.S.
- Listed height: 6 ft 7 in (2.01 m)
- Listed weight: 215 lb (98 kg)

Career information
- High school: Pinewood Prep (Summerville, South Carolina)
- College: Furman (2018–2023)
- NBA draft: 2023: 2nd round, 54th overall pick
- Drafted by: Sacramento Kings
- Playing career: 2023–present

Career history
- 2023–2024: Sacramento Kings
- 2023–2024: →Stockton Kings
- 2024–2025: Osceola Magic
- 2025–2026: Noblesville Boom
- 2026–present: Indiana Pacers
- 2026–present: →Noblesville Boom

Career highlights
- NBA G League All-Defensive Team (2026); SoCon Player of the Year (2023); SoCon Defensive Player of the Year (2022); 2× First-team All-SoCon (2022, 2023)
- Stats at NBA.com
- Stats at Basketball Reference

Jalen Brooks Slawson (born October 22, 1999) is an American professional basketball player for the Indiana Pacers of the National Basketball Association (NBA), on a two-way contract with the Noblesville Boom of the NBA G League. He played college basketball for the Furman Paladins.

== Early life and high school career ==
Slawson grew up in Summerville, South Carolina and attended Pinewood Preparatory School. He was named the Area Player of the Year after averaging 14.6 points, 10.5 rebounds, 4.1 blocks and 3.5 assists per game as a senior. Slawson committed to playing college basketball for Furman.

== College career ==
Slawson was a key bench player during his freshman season at Furman and became a starter entering his sophomore year. He averaged 8.7 points as a junior. Slawson was named the Southern Conference (SoCon) Defensive Player of the Year and first-team All-SoCon after averaging 14.5 points, 7.4 rebounds, 3.7 assists, 1.7 steals and 1.7 blocks per game during his senior season.

Slawson decided to utilize the extra year of eligibility granted to college athletes who played in the 2020 season due to the COVID-19 pandemic and return to Furman for a fifth season. He was named the SoCon Player of the Year as he helped lead the Paladins to their first NCAA tournament appearance in 43 years. Slawson averaged 15.6 points, 7.1 rebounds, 3.2 assists, 1.5 steals and 1.5 blocks per game on the season. He scored 19 points and grabbed 10 rebounds in the Paladins' 68–67 upset win over Virginia in the first round of the NCAA tournament.

== Professional career ==
=== Sacramento / Stockton Kings (2023–2024) ===
Slawson was selected by the Sacramento Kings in the second round of the 2023 NBA draft with the 54th overall pick and on July 2, 2023, he signed a two-way contract with them. Slawson made 12 appearances for the Kings during his rookie campaign, recording averages of 0.7 points, 0.6 rebounds, and 0.2 assists.

=== Osceola Magic (2024–2025) ===
On September 11, 2024, Slawson signed with the Orlando Magic, but was waived on October 19. Eight days later, he joined the Osceola Magic.

=== Indiana Pacers (2025–present) ===
On September 9, 2025, Slawson signed with the Indiana Pacers on an Exhibit 10 contract. He was included on the Pacers' training camp roster, with the expectation of playing for the Noblesville Boom. Slawson played in his first game with the Pacers in their preseason opener against the Minnesota Timberwolves, scoring nine points. On October 18, Slawson was waived by Indiana. On October 27, the Noblesville Boom announced Slawson would be part of the 2025–26 training camp roster. On November 4, he played in the Boom's first scrimmage. On November 5, the Boom announced Slawson would be on their 2025–26 roster.

On February 27, 2026, Slawson signed a two-way contract with the Pacers, following Quenton Jackson's promotion to a standard contract. Slawson made 13 appearances (including six starts) for Indiana during the 2025–26 NBA season, averaging 7.3 points, 4.4 rebounds, and 2.8 assists (all career-highs).

On July 22, 2026, Slawson signed another two-way contract with the Pacers.

== Career statistics ==
Legend
GP	Games played	GS	Games started	MPG	Minutes per game
FG%	Field goal percentage	3P%	3-point field goal percentage	FT%	Free throw percentage
RPG	Rebounds per game	APG	Assists per game	SPG	Steals per game
BPG	Blocks per game	PPG	Points per game	**Bold**	Career high

=== NBA ===
Year	Team	GP	GS	MPG	FG%	3P%	FT%	RPG	APG	SPG	BPG	PPG
2023–24	Sacramento	12	0	3.1	.**667**	.000	—	.6	.2	.1	.1	.7
2025–26	Indiana	**13**	**6**	**23.9**	.442	**.375**	**.706**	**4.4**	**2.8**	**1.5**	**1.1**	**7.3**
Career		25	6	13.9	.458	.357	.706	2.6	1.5	.8	.6	4.1

=== College ===
Year	Team	GP	GS	MPG	FG%	3P%	FT%	RPG	APG	SPG	BPG	PPG
2018–19	Furman	26	0	6.0	.364	.167	.250	1.5	.2	.5	.5	.7
2019–20	Furman	32	32	22.6	.497	.265	.727	5.1	1.5	1.1	.8	6.9
2020–21	Furman	25	17	25.5	**.569**	.368	.691	5.3	2.8	1.2	1.2	8.7
2021–22	Furman	34	34	**30.9**	.486	.306	**.795**	**7.4**	**3.7**	**1.7**	**1.7**	14.5
2022–23	Furman	**36**	**36**	30.7	.556	**.394**	.775	7.1	3.2	1.5	1.5	**15.6**
Career		153	119	24.0	.519	.329	.754	5.5	2.4	1.3	1.2	9.9

== Personal life ==
Slawson's father, Tom Slawson, played college basketball at The Citadel.
