= Taelon Peter =

American basketball player (born 2002)

No. 4 – Austin Spurs
- Position: Shooting guard
- League: NBA G League

Personal information
- Born: February 27, 2002 (age 24) Russellville, Arkansas, U.S.
- Listed height: 6 ft 3 in (1.91 m)
- Listed weight: 185 lb (84 kg)

Career information
- High school: Russellville (Russellville, Arkansas)
- College: Tennessee Tech (2020–2021); Arkansas Tech (2021–2024); Liberty (2024–2025)
- NBA draft: 2025: 2nd round, 54th overall pick
- Drafted by: Indiana Pacers
- Playing career: 2025–present

Career history
- 2025–2026: Indiana Pacers
- 2025–2026: →Noblesville Boom
- 2026–present: Austin Spurs

Career highlights
- Third-team All-Conference USA (2025); Conference USA Sixth Man of the Year (2025); GAC Player of the Year (2024); First-team All-GAC (2024)
- Stats at NBA.com
- Stats at Basketball Reference

Taelon Joseph Peter (born February 27, 2002) is an American professional basketball player for the Austin Spurs of the NBA G League. He played college basketball for the Tennessee Tech Golden Eagles, Arkansas Tech Wonder Boys and Liberty Flames. He was selected by the Pacers in the second round of the 2025 NBA draft.

== Early life and high school career ==
Peter was born on February 27, 2002, and grew up in Russellville, Arkansas. He attended Russellville High School where he competed in basketball and track and field as a high jumper. He won two state championships in the high jump and in basketball, averaged 16 points per game as a senior. He was all-state in track and field and was named the Class 5A West Player of the Year, River Valley Now Player of the Year, all-state and all-conference in basketball. After high school, he signed to play college basketball for Tennessee Tech in 2020.

== College career ==
Peter only played six games as a freshman for Tennessee Tech in 2020–21 before transferring to the NCAA Division II-level Arkansas Tech Wonder Boys. He averaged 10 points playing in 25 games off the bench for Arkansas Tech in 2021–22. He then became a starter in 2022–23, averaging 15.5 points while shooting 44% from the field. In 2023–24, he was named the Great American Conference (GAC) Player of the Year and first-team All-GAC after averaging 18.5 points and starting every game for the Wonder Boys.

Peter finished his three-year stint at Arkansas Tech with overall averages of 15 points and 5.2 rebounds and transferred to the Liberty Flames for his final year of eligibility in 2024–25. In one season with the Flames, he averaged 13.7 points and four rebounds, being selected third-team All-Conference USA and the Conference USA Sixth Man of the Year. He led the conference in free throw percentage and also was the national leader with a true shooting percentage of 72.4%, "a statistic that combines field goal and free throw shooting proficiency".

== Professional career ==
Peter was selected by the Indiana Pacers in the second round (54th overall) of the 2025 NBA draft. He made 38 appearances for Indiana during the 2025–26 NBA season, recording averages of 4.5 points, 1.6 rebounds, and 1.1 assists. On July 20, 2026, Peter was waived by the Pacers.

On August 7, 2026, Peter signed an Exhibit 10 contract with the San Antonio Spurs. He was waived by the Spurs on October 14, 2026.

== Career statistics ==
Legend
GP	Games played	GS	Games started	MPG	Minutes per game
FG%	Field goal percentage	3P%	3-point field goal percentage	FT%	Free throw percentage
RPG	Rebounds per game	APG	Assists per game	SPG	Steals per game
BPG	Blocks per game	PPG	Points per game	**Bold**	Career high

=== NBA ===
Year	Team	GP	GS	MPG	FG%	3P%	FT%	RPG	APG	SPG	BPG	PPG
2025–26	Indiana	38	0	12.9	.380	.328	.625	1.6	1.1	.7	.1	4.5
Career		38	0	12.9	.380	.328	.625	1.6	1.1	.7	.1	4.5

=== College ===
==== NCAA Division I ====
Year	Team	GP	GS	MPG	FG%	3P%	FT%	RPG	APG	SPG	BPG	PPG
2020–21	Tennessee Tech	6	0	8.2	.286	.200	—	.2	.5	.2	.0	1.7
2024–25	Liberty	**35**	**2**	**22.7**	**.578**	**.453**	**.773**	**4.0**	**1.0**	**.9**	**.1**	**13.7**
Career		41	2	20.6	.564	.439	.773	3.5	1.0	.8	.1	11.9

==== NCAA Division II ====
Year	Team	GP	GS	MPG	FG%	3P%	FT%	RPG	APG	SPG	BPG	PPG
2021–22	Arkansas Tech	25	7	26.7	**.503**	.406	.809	4.0	1.8	1.1	.2	10.0
2022–23	Arkansas Tech	31	30	33.4	.437	.326	.793	5.5	1.7	**1.8**	**.5**	15.5
2023–24	Arkansas Tech	**32**	**32**	**35.0**	.499	**.409**	**.868**	**5.8**	**2.3**	**1.8**	**.5**	**18.5**
Career		88	69	32.1	.475	.373	.833	5.2	2.0	1.6	.4	15.0
