= Bennedict Mathurin =

Canadian basketball player (born 2002)

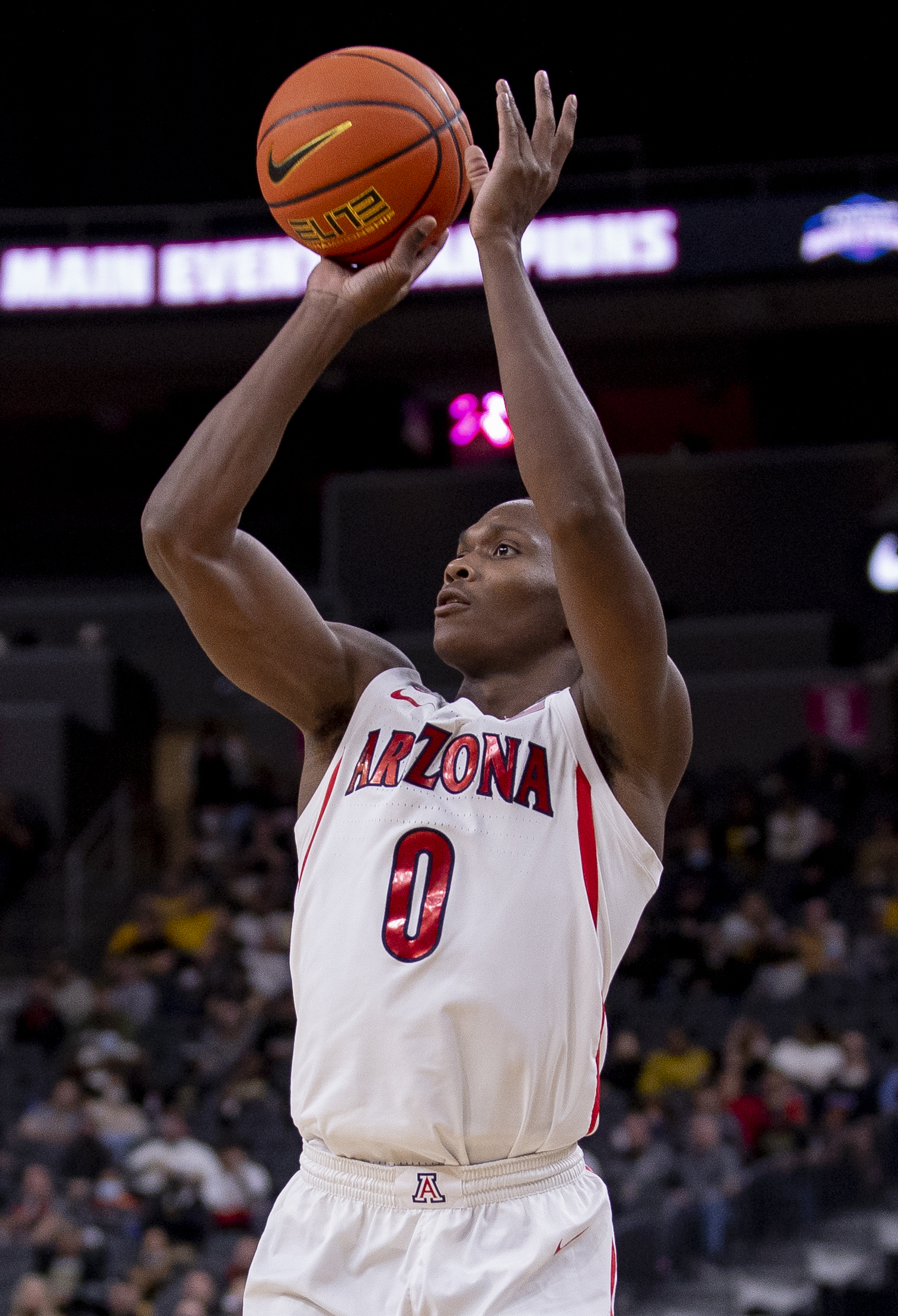
- Mathurin with Arizona in 2021

No. 24 – New Orleans Pelicans
- Position: Shooting guard / small forward
- League: NBA

Personal information
- Born: June 19, 2002 (age 24) Montreal, Quebec, Canada
- Listed height: 6 ft 6 in (1.98 m)
- Listed weight: 222 lb (101 kg)

Career information
- College: Arizona (2020–2022)
- NBA draft: 2022: 1st round, 6th overall pick
- Drafted by: Indiana Pacers
- Playing career: 2022–present

Career history
- 2022–2026: Indiana Pacers
- 2026: Los Angeles Clippers
- 2026–present: New Orleans Pelicans

Career highlights
- NBA All-Rookie First Team (2023); 2024 NBA Rising Stars Challenge MVP; Consensus second-team All-American (2022); Pac-12 Player of the Year (2022); First-team All-Pac-12 (2022); Pac-12 tournament MOP (2022); Pac-12 All-Freshman Team (2021)
- Stats at NBA.com
- Stats at Basketball Reference
Medals
Men's basketball
Representing Canada
FIBA Under-19 World Cup
| Bronze medal – third place | 2021 Latvia | Team |

Bennedict Richard Felder Mathurin (/ˈmæθərɪn/ MATH-ər-in, French: [matyʁɛ̃]; born June 19, 2002) is a Canadian professional basketball player for the New Orleans Pelicans of the National Basketball Association (NBA). He played college basketball for the Arizona Wildcats, where he was named a consensus second-team All-America and Pac-12 Player of the Year after his sophomore season. Mathurin was selected sixth overall by the Indiana Pacers in the 2022 NBA draft. He was voted to the NBA All-Rookie First Team in 2023 and finished fourth in voting for the 2023 NBA Rookie of the Year award.

== Early life and career ==
Mathurin was born and raised in Montreal, Quebec. He grew up playing ice hockey and Canadian football as a quarterback. He competed for the Quebec provincial basketball team. In 2018, Mathurin joined the NBA Academy Latin America in Mexico City, becoming its first Canadian-born player. He committed to playing college basketball for Arizona, choosing the Wildcats over Baylor. He was considered the best Canadian prospect in his class by North Pole Hoops.

== College career ==
On January 2, 2021, Mathurin posted 24 points and 11 rebounds in an 86–82 win over Washington State. On January 14, he recorded 31 points and eight rebounds in a 98–64 win over Oregon State. Mathurin averaged 10.8 points, 4.8 rebounds and 1.2 assists per game, shooting 41.8 percent from three-point range. Despite gaining interest as a draft prospect, he decided to return for his sophomore season. On December 11, 2021, Mathurin scored 30 points in a 83–79 win against Illinois. Mathurin won the 2022 Pac-12 Tournament Most Outstanding Player after leading the Wildcats to their eighth conference tournament title. He was named Pac-12 Player of the Year, the ninth player in Arizona Wildcats history to do so. Following his Sophomore season, Mathurin was voted a consensus second-team All-America, the fifth in Wildcat history to make second team and thirtieth All-American in school history. By winning conference player of the year he became the 31st Arizona Wildcat men's basketball player to have his name put into the school's Ring of Honor.

On April 14, 2022, Mathurin declared for the 2022 NBA draft, forgoing his remaining college eligibility.

== Professional career ==
=== Indiana Pacers (2022–2026) ===
==== 2022–23 season: All–Rookie First Team honors ====
Mathurin was selected with the 6th overall pick by the Indiana Pacers in the 2022 NBA draft. He is the first ever player from Montreal to be selected as a lottery pick. He joined the seventh overall pick, Shaedon Sharpe, as the only Canadians drafted in the first round that year. Mathurin was the Pacers' highest pick the franchise has owned since selecting Rik Smits second overall in the 1988 NBA draft. On July 3, 2022, Mathurin signed his rookie contract with the Pacers. On July 8, he made his NBA Summer League debut, recording 23 points and four rebounds in a 96–84 win over the Charlotte Hornets. Ten days later, Mathurin was named to the All–NBA Summer League Second Team, averaging 19.3 points, 4 rebounds and 1.3 steals per game.

On October 19, Mathurin made his regular season debut coming off the bench, recording 19 points in a 114–107 loss to the Washington Wizards. He would follow that performance by scoring 26 points against Jeremy Sochan and the San Antonio Spurs on October 21, and 27 points against Jaden Ivey and the Detroit Pistons on October 22. His 72 points through the first three games of the season was the most by a rookie since Jerry Stackhouse scored 76 to start off the 1995–96 NBA season. On October 26, he became the first Pacer to score 100–plus points through their first five career games. On October 29, Mathurin set a career high with 32 points on 6–of–9 three-point shooting and five rebounds in a 125–116 win over the Brooklyn Nets. On November 9, Mathurin recorded 30 points on 10–of–17 shooting from the field and 6–of–9 shooting from three in a loss to the Denver Nuggets. On December 1, Mathurin was named Eastern Conference Rookie of the Month, averaging 19.2 points, 4 rebounds, on 40.3% three-point shooting.

On January 31, 2023, Mathurin was named a 2023 NBA Rising Star alongside standout rookie teammate Andrew Nembhard. On February 13, after scoring 21 points against the Utah Jazz, Mathurin became the fastest Pacer rookie since Chuck Person in the 1986–87 season to reach 1,000 career points. With the Pacers dropping out of playoff contention, Mathurin became a starter over the last 10 games of his rookie season. On March 28, as a starter against the Milwaukee Bucks, Mathurin recorded 29 points and a career-high 9 rebounds, while passing teammate Chris Duarte for most three-pointers made as a rookie in Pacers franchise history. At the 2022–23 season's end, he finished fourth in the 2023 NBA Rookie of the Year Award voting and earned NBA All–Rookie First Team honors.

==== 2023–24 season: Season–ending shoulder injury ====
On November 8, 2023, Mathurin recorded 22 points, 9 rebounds, 4 assists, 2 steals, along with 4 threes made in a win against the Utah Jazz. On November 9, the next day, he scored 26 points to go along with a 11 rebounds, a steal, and a block in a win against the Milwaukee Bucks.

On February 17, 2024, Mathurin was named MVP of the 2024 NBA Rising Stars Challenge (as part of NBA All–Star Weekend), which was played in Indianapolis at Gainbridge Fieldhouse. He notably scored 22 total points in the Rising Stars tournament and helped lead Team Jalen to a Rising Stars championship. On March 9, Mathurin was diagnosed with a torn labrum in his right shoulder, an injury which required surgery. He missed the remainder of the 2023–24 season. Despite Mathurin's injury the Pacers made it to the Eastern Conference Finals.

==== 2024–25 season: NBA Finals appearance ====
On November 10, 2024, Mathurin put up a career-high 38 points with 7-of-8 three-pointers made in a 132–121 win over the New York Knicks. He and Tyrese Haliburton became the second duo to each score at least 35 points in a game in Pacers franchise history, after Jalen Rose and Reggie Miller during the 2000 NBA Eastern Conference Semifinals against the Philadelphia 76ers.

On March 20, 2025, Mathurin scored 28 points and collected a career-high 16 rebounds in an overtime win over the Brooklyn Nets. On May 29, he recorded 23 points and 9 rebounds, both team-highs, on 6-10 shooting and 9-9 free throws, in a game-five loss to the New York Knicks in the Eastern Conference Finals. The Pacers eventually won the series, advancing to the 2025 NBA Finals. On June 11, Mathurin scored a playoff career-high 27 points in only 22 minutes off the bench in a 116–107 Game 3 win over the Oklahoma City Thunder to help the Pacers take a 2–1 series lead.

==== 2025–26 season ====
Mathurin made 28 appearances (including 24 starts) for the Pacers during the 2025–26 NBA season, averaging 17.8 points, 5.4 rebounds, and 2.3 assists.

=== Los Angeles Clippers (2026) ===
On February 5, 2026, Mathurin, Isaiah Jackson, two first-round picks and one second-round pick were traded to the Los Angeles Clippers in exchange for Ivica Zubac and Kobe Brown. In his Clippers home debut on February 19, Mathurin scored a career-high-tying 38 points off the bench in a 115–114 win over the Denver Nuggets.

=== New Orleans Pelicans (2026–present) ===
On September 11, 2026, Mathurin agreed to a two-year, $16 million contract with the New Orleans Pelicans. On October 21, he made his Pelicans debut, recording 11 points, three rebounds and two assists in a 123–120 loss to the Indiana Pacers.

== National team career ==
Mathurin played for Canada at the 2021 FIBA Under-19 World Cup in Riga and Daugavpils, Latvia after being cut from the Olympic team. On July 4, 2021, he scored a team-high 30 points, shooting 11–of–15 from the field and 6–of–9 from three-point range, in a 100–75 group-stage win over Japan. One week later, Mathurin scored 31 points to lead Canada to a 101–92 victory over Serbia in the third–place game and win the bronze medal. He averaged 16.1 points and four rebounds per game in the tournament.

== Career statistics ==
Legend
| GP | Games played | GS | Games started | MPG | Minutes per game |
| FG% | Field goal percentage | 3P% | 3-point field goal percentage | FT% | Free throw percentage |
| RPG | Rebounds per game | APG | Assists per game | SPG | Steals per game |
| BPG | Blocks per game | PPG | Points per game | **Bold** | Career high |

=== NBA ===
==== Regular season ====
| Year | Team | GP | GS | MPG | FG% | 3P% | FT% | RPG | APG | SPG | BPG | PPG |
|---|---|---|---|---|---|---|---|---|---|---|---|---|
| 2022–23 | Indiana | **78** | 17 | 28.5 | .434 | .323 | .828 | 4.1 | 1.5 | .6 | .2 | 16.7 |
| 2023–24 | Indiana | 59 | 19 | 26.1 | .446 | **.374** | .821 | 4.0 | 2.0 | .6 | .2 | 14.5 |
| 2024–25 | Indiana | 72 | **49** | 29.8 | **.458** | .340 | .831 | 5.3 | 1.9 | .7 | **.3** | 16.1 |
| 2025–26 | Indiana | 28 | 24 | **31.8** | .433 | .372 | **.884** | 5.4 | 2.3 | .6 | .1 | **17.8** |
| 2025–26 | L.A. Clippers | 26 | 1 | 28.0 | .426 | .207 | .858 | **5.5** | **2.5** | **1.0** | **.3** | 17.4 |
| Career | | 263 | 110 | 28.6 | .442 | .336 | .838 | 4.7 | 1.9 | .7 | .2 | 16.2 |

==== Playoffs ====
| Year | Team | GP | GS | MPG | FG% | 3P% | FT% | RPG | APG | SPG | BPG | PPG |
|---|---|---|---|---|---|---|---|---|---|---|---|---|
| 2025 | Indiana | 22 | 0 | 17.5 | .459 | .300 | .864 | 3.3 | .9 | .4 | .3 | 11.0 |
| Career | | 22 | 0 | 17.5 | .459 | .300 | .864 | 3.3 | .9 | .4 | .3 | 11.0 |

=== College ===
| Year | Team | GP | GS | MPG | FG% | 3P% | FT% | RPG | APG | SPG | BPG | PPG |
|---|---|---|---|---|---|---|---|---|---|---|---|---|
| 2020–21 | Arizona | 26 | 12 | 25.0 | **.471** | **.418** | **.846** | 4.8 | 1.2 | .7 | .1 | 10.8 |
| 2021–22 | Arizona | **37** | **37** | **32.5** | .450 | .369 | .764 | **5.6** | **2.5** | **1.0** | **.3** | **17.7** |
| Career | | 63 | 49 | 29.4 | .456 | .383 | .789 | 5.3 | 2.0 | .9 | .2 | 14.8 |

== Personal life ==
Mathurin is of Haitian descent. His older sister, Jennifer, played college basketball for NC State. When Mathurin was 12 years old, his 15–year–old brother died in a bicycle accident. He speaks English, French, Spanish, and Haitian Creole.
