= Dereon Seabron =

American basketball player (born 2000)

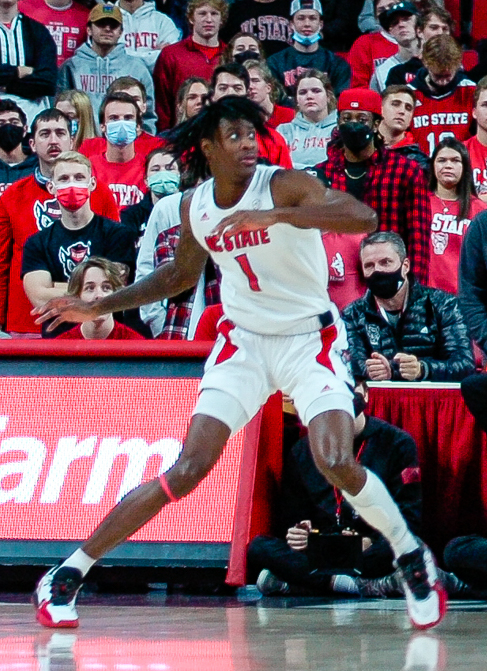
- Seabron with NC in 2021

Free agent
- Position: Shooting guard

Personal information
- Born: May 26, 2000 (age 26) Norfolk, Virginia, U.S.
- Listed height: 6 ft 5 in (1.96 m)
- Listed weight: 180 lb (82 kg)

Career information
- High school: Lake Taylor (Norfolk, Virginia); Massanutten Military Academy (Woodstock, Virginia)
- College: NC State (2020–2022)
- NBA draft: 2022: undrafted
- Playing career: 2022–present

Career history
- 2022–2024: New Orleans Pelicans
- 2022–2024: →Birmingham Squadron
- 2024: Motor City Cruise
- 2024: Salt Lake City Stars
- 2024: Motor City Cruise
- 2025–2026: Beijing Royal Fighters
- 2026: Salt Lake City Stars

Career highlights
- Second-team All-ACC (2022); ACC Most Improved Player (2022)
- Stats at NBA.com
- Stats at Basketball Reference

Dereon Seabron (/ˈdɛri.ɒn/ DERR-ee-on; born May 26, 2000) is an American professional basketball. He played college basketball for the NC State Wolfpack.

== High school career ==
Seabron played basketball for Lake Taylor High School in Norfolk, Virginia. As a sophomore, he helped his team reach the 4A state title game. In his junior season, Seabron averaged 17.2 points and seven rebounds per game. As a senior, he averaged 22.5 points and 11 rebounds per game, leading Lake Taylor to its first state championship. Seabron was named 4A Player of the Year and All-Tidewater Player of the Year. He opted to play a postgraduate season at Massanutten Military Academy in Woodstock, Virginia to gain more attention from college programs. A four-star recruit, he committed to playing college basketball for NC State in April 2019 over offers from Georgia, Pittsburgh, Providence and VCU.

== College career ==
Seabron redshirted his first season at NC State after being ruled academically ineligible by the NCAA and losing the appeal. In the regular season finale against Notre Dame, Seabron had his first double-double with 17 points and 13 rebounds, and he earned ACC Freshman of the Week honors. As a freshman, he averaged 5.2 points and 3.5 rebounds per game. On December 1, 2021, Seabron posted a career-high 39 points and 18 rebounds in a 104–100 win against Nebraska in quadruple overtime, breaking the ACC–Big Ten Challenge single-game scoring record. He scored the most points in a game by an NC State player since T. J. Warren scored 42 points against Boston College on March 29, 2014. As a sophomore, Seabron was named ACC Most Improved Player as well as Second Team All-ACC.

== Professional career ==
After going undrafted in the 2022 NBA draft, Seabron signed a two-way contract with the New Orleans Pelicans on September 9, 2022. On April 6, 2023, the Pelicans waived Seabron, but re-signed him to another two-way contract on April 9.

On September 17, 2024, Seabron signed with the Detroit Pistons, but was waived on October 17. On October 29, he joined the Motor City Cruise.

On December 27, 2024, Seabron was traded to the Salt Lake City Stars.

== Career statistics ==
Legend
GP	Games played	GS	Games started	MPG	Minutes per game
FG%	Field goal percentage	3P%	3-point field goal percentage	FT%	Free throw percentage
RPG	Rebounds per game	APG	Assists per game	SPG	Steals per game
BPG	Blocks per game	PPG	Points per game	**Bold**	Career high

=== NBA ===
==== Regular season ====
Year	Team	GP	GS	MPG	FG%	3P%	FT%	RPG	APG	SPG	BPG	PPG
2022–23	New Orleans	5	0	2.3	**.400**	—	—	.2	.0	.0	.0	.8
2023–24	New Orleans	**6**	0	**9.2**	.308	.500	.833	**1.2**	**.8**	**.3**	**.2**	**2.3**
Career		11	0	6.1	.333	.500	.833	.7	.5	.2	.1	1.6

=== College ===
Year	Team	GP	GS	MPG	FG%	3P%	FT%	RPG	APG	SPG	BPG	PPG
2019–20	NC State	Redshirt										
2020–21	NC State	24	8	17.4	.485	.250	.576	3.5	.8	.7	**.3**	5.2
2021–22	NC State	**32**	**32**	**35.8**	**.491**	**.256**	**.713**	**8.2**	**3.2**	**1.4**	.1	**17.3**
Career		56	40	27.9	.490	.254	.694	6.1	2.2	1.1	.2	12.1

== See also ==
- List of All-Atlantic Coast Conference men's basketball teams
