= Micah Potter =

American basketball player (born 1998)

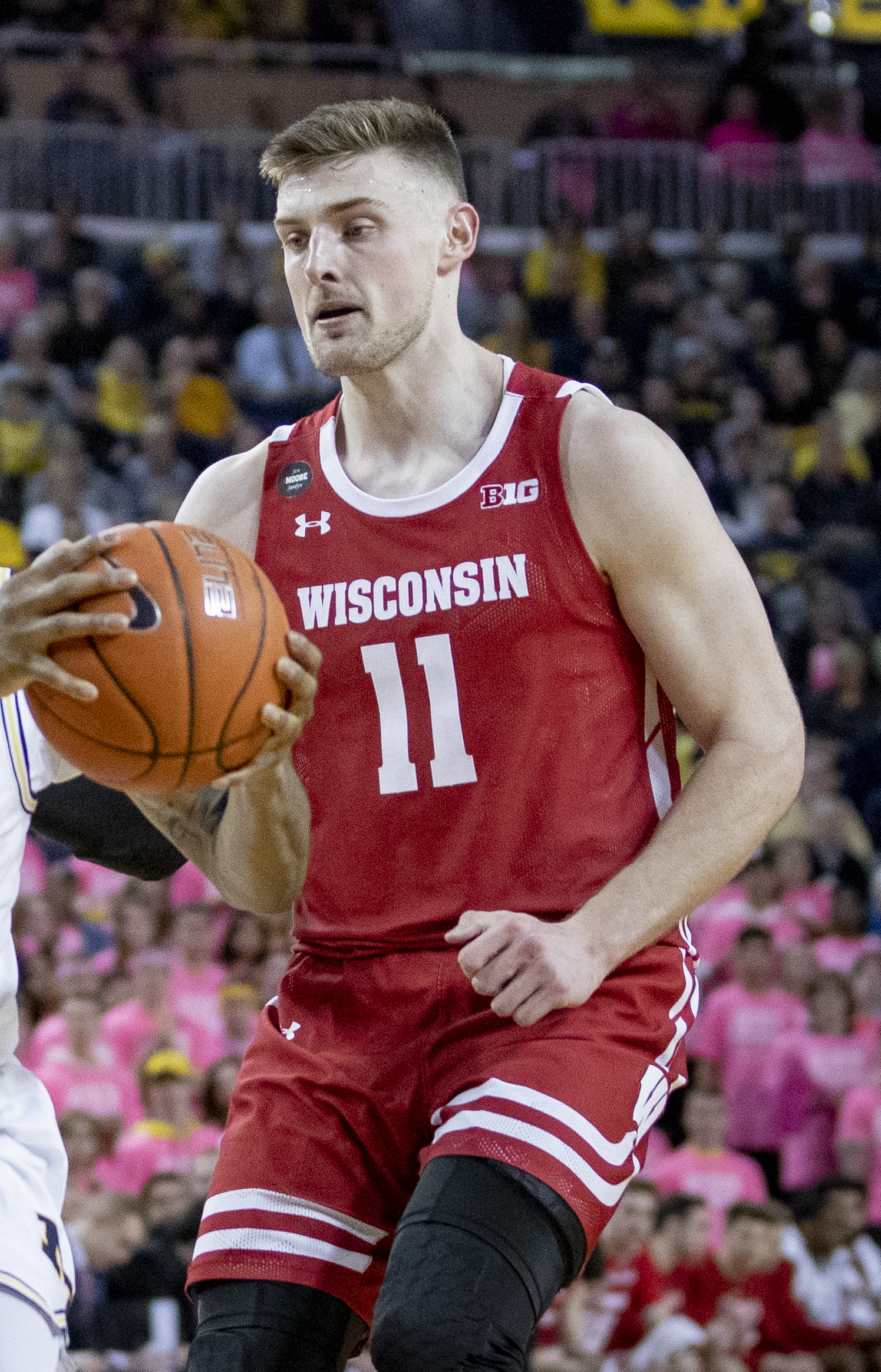
- Potter with Wisconsin in 2020

No. 9 – Portland Trail Blazers
- Position: Center
- League: NBA

Personal information
- Born: April 6, 1998 (age 28) Mentor, Ohio, U.S.
- Listed height: 6 ft 9 in (2.06 m)
- Listed weight: 248 lb (112 kg)

Career information
- High school: Mentor (Mentor, Ohio); Montverde Academy (Montverde, Florida)
- College: Ohio State (2016–2018); Wisconsin (2019–2021)
- NBA draft: 2021: undrafted
- Playing career: 2021–present

Career history
- 2021–2022: Sioux Falls Skyforce
- 2021–2022: Detroit Pistons
- 2022–2025: Utah Jazz
- 2022–2025: →Salt Lake City Stars
- 2025: Austin Spurs
- 2025–2026: Indiana Pacers
- 2026–present: Portland Trail Blazers

Career highlights
- NBA G League All-Rookie Team (2022)
- Stats at NBA.com
- Stats at Basketball Reference

Micah Potter (born April 6, 1998) is an American professional basketball player for the Portland Trail Blazers of the National Basketball Association (NBA). He played college basketball for the Ohio State Buckeyes and Wisconsin Badgers.

== Early life ==
Micah Potter attended Mentor High School in Mentor, Ohio and was a bench player until his junior season. He averaged 20.2 points and 9.1 rebounds per game as a junior, earning First Team All-State honors. For his senior season, Potter transferred to Montverde Academy in Montverde, Florida. He averaged 10.7 points and 5.5 rebounds per game and was named team most valuable player. Potter committed to playing college basketball for Ohio State.

== College career ==
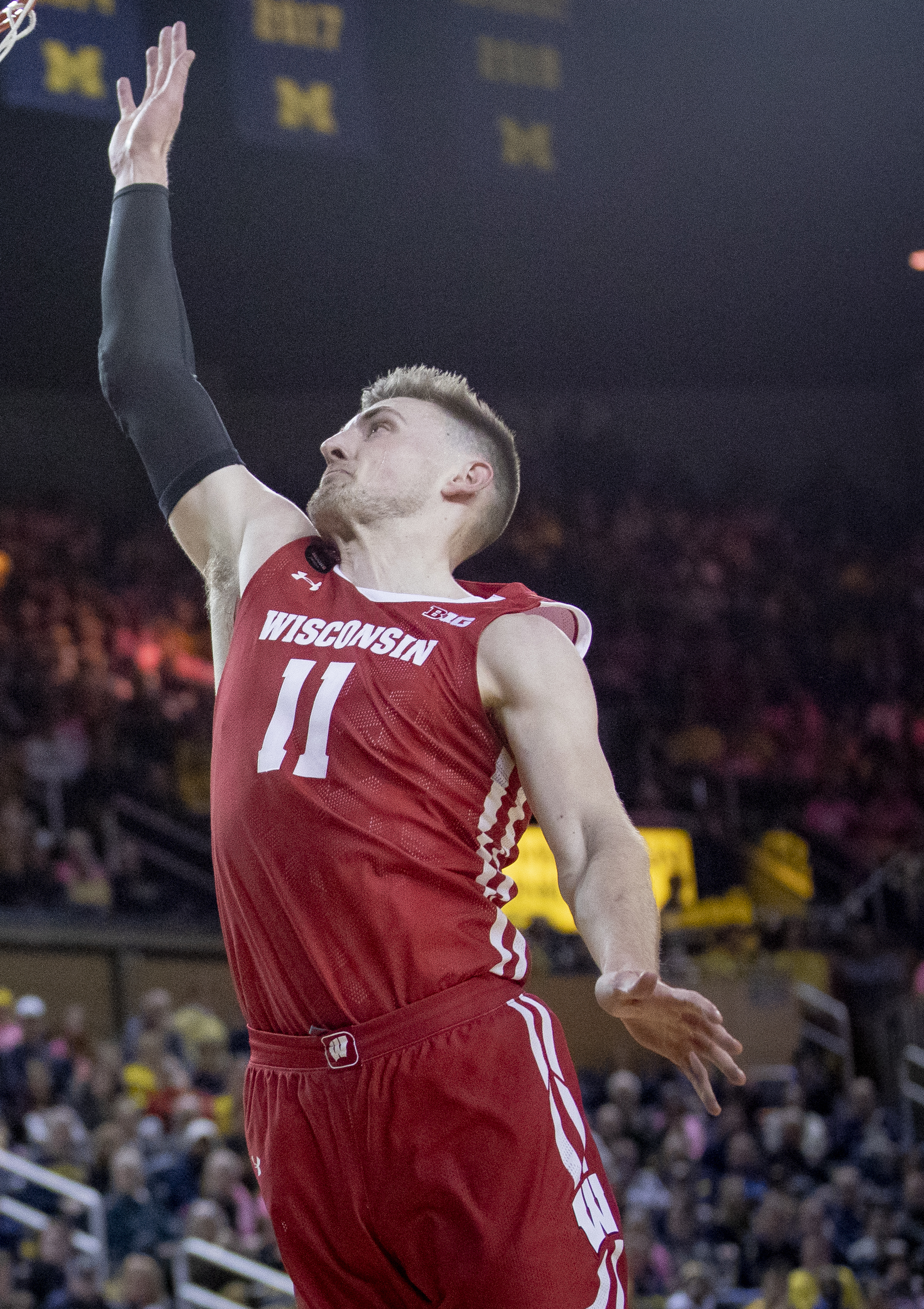
Potter in 2020

Potter began his freshman season for Ohio State in the starting lineup but was replaced by Trevor Thompson after missing two games with an ankle injury. He averaged 4.1 points and 3.1 rebounds per game as a freshman. Potter suffered a high ankle sprain in the fourth game of his sophomore season and received limited playing time with the emergence of Kaleb Wesson and Keita Bates-Diop. As a sophomore, he averaged 4.1 points and 2.4 rebounds per game. Two days before his junior season, Potter announced that he would transfer from Ohio State.

Potter transferred to Wisconsin and sat out for the 2018–19 season due to transfer rules. Potter also sat out for the next fall semester after his request for immediate eligibility was denied by the National Collegiate Athletic Association. On January 11, 2020, he recorded a junior season-high 24 points and 13 rebounds in a 58–49 win over Penn State. As a junior, he averaged 10.1 points and 6.2 rebounds per game through 21 appearances. Entering his senior season, Potter was named to the Kareem Abdul-Jabbar Award preseason watch list. He averaged 12.5 points and 5.9 rebounds per games and started 20 of 31 games.

== Professional career ==
=== Sioux Falls Skyforce / Detroit Pistons (2021–2022) ===
After going undrafted in the 2021 NBA draft, Potter joined the Miami Heat for the 2021 NBA Summer League and on September 10, he signed a contract with the Heat. He was one of the final cuts in training camp and joined the Sioux Falls Skyforce as an affiliate player. Potter averaged 14.1 points and 10.7 rebounds per game.

On December 29, 2021, Potter signed a 10-day contract with the Detroit Pistons and returned to Sioux Falls afterwards.

Potter joined the New York Knicks for the 2022 NBA Summer League.

=== Utah Jazz (2022–2025) ===
On October 12, 2022, Potter signed a two-way contract with the Utah Jazz.

On January 27, 2023, Potter underwent right elbow surgery and was ruled out for at least four-to-six weeks.

On August 6, 2024, Potter signed another two-way contract with the Jazz. He made 38 appearances (10 starts) for Utah during the 2024–25 NBA season, averaging 4.3 points, 4.3 rebounds, and 0.8 assists.

=== Austin Spurs (2025) ===
On August 7, 2025, Potter signed a training camp deal with the San Antonio Spurs. He was waived by the Spurs prior to the start of the regular season on October 18. For the 2025–26 season, he was added to the roster of the Spurs' G League affiliate, the Austin Spurs.

=== Indiana Pacers (2025–2026) ===
On December 26, 2025, Potter signed a two-year, $4.3 million contract with the Indiana Pacers. He made 47 total appearances (including seven starts) for Indiana during the 2025–26 NBA season, recording averages of 9.7 points, 5.0 rebounds, and 1.5 assists. On July 8, 2026, Potter was waived by the Pacers.

=== Portland Trail Blazers (2026–present) ===
On July 10, 2026, Potter was claimed off waivers by the Portland Trail Blazers. On October 21, he made his debut for the team, recording four points and three rebounds in a 124–83 win over the Phoenix Suns.

== National team ==
Potter and fellow Wisconsin Badger alumni Nigel Hayes-Davis were named to the USA Basketball Select Team to help prepare the main roster for the 2024 Olympics.

== Career statistics ==
Legend
GP	Games played	GS	Games started	MPG	Minutes per game
FG%	Field goal percentage	3P%	3-point field goal percentage	FT%	Free throw percentage
RPG	Rebounds per game	APG	Assists per game	SPG	Steals per game
BPG	Blocks per game	PPG	Points per game	**Bold**	Career high

=== NBA ===
Year	Team	GP	GS	MPG	FG%	3P%	FT%	RPG	APG	SPG	BPG	PPG
2021–22	Detroit	3	0	10.3	.455	.000	**1.000**	3.0	.0	.3	.3	4.0
2022–23	Utah	7	0	7.5	**.667**	**.571**	—	2.3	.6	.1	.0	3.4
2023–24	Utah	16	0	11.6	.475	.429	.750	2.7	.4	.3	**.4**	3.3
2024–25	Utah	38	**10**	18.6	.422	.316	.850	4.3	.8	.4	**.4**	4.3
2025–26	Indiana	**47**	7	**19.3**	.515	.423	.842	**5.0**	**1.5**	**.5**	.3	**9.7**
Career		111	17	17.0	.490	.389	.840	4.2	1.0	.4	.3	6.4

=== College ===
Year	Team	GP	GS	MPG	FG%	3P%	FT%	RPG	APG	SPG	BPG	PPG
2016–17	Ohio State	30	12	14.1	.434	.333	.600	3.1	.3	.3	.4	4.1
2017–18	Ohio State	29	4	10.1	.489	.300	.800	2.4	.3	.2	.4	4.1
2018–19	Wisconsin	Redshirt										
2019–20	Wisconsin	21	3	17.5	**.528**	**.451**	**.860**	**6.2**	.4	.4	**1.0**	10.1
2020–21	Wisconsin	**31**	**20**	**22.2**	.504	.386	.840	5.9	**1.4**	**.5**	.7	**12.5**
Career		111	39	15.9	.496	.381	.794	4.3	.6	.3	.6	7.6

== Personal life ==
Potter is a Christian. His older brother, Caleb, played baseball for West Virginia and Southern New Hampshire. His younger brother, Noah, played football for Ohio State, and later for both Cincinnati and North Carolina State. Potter's late grandfather was married to the grandmother of Jon Teske.

Micah married Elle Van Grinsven, a former volleyball player and graduate of Loyola University Chicago, on June 11, 2021, in Lomira, Wisconsin.
