= Quenton Jackson =

American basketball player (born 1998)

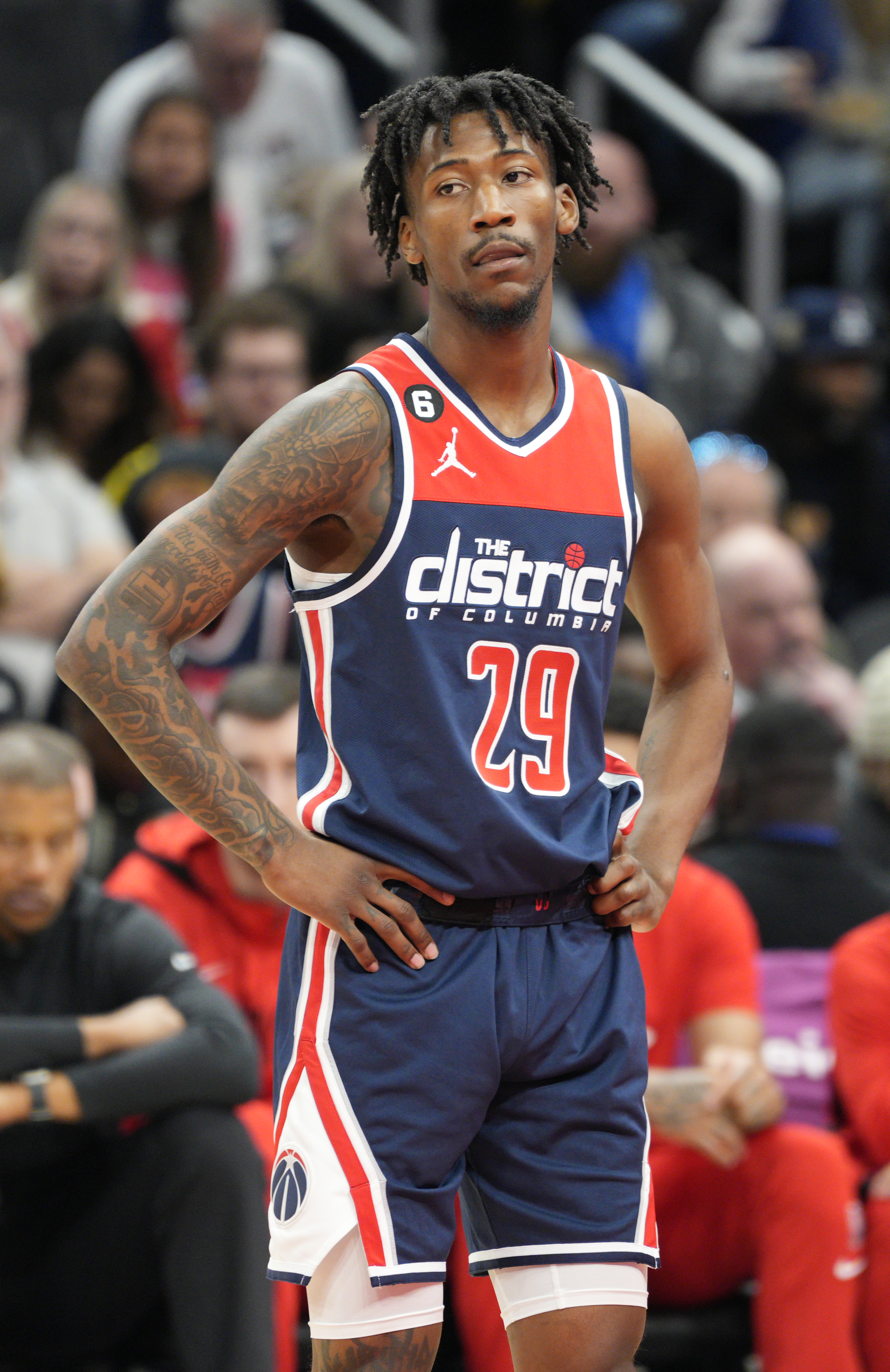
- Jackson with the Washington Wizards in 2023

No. 29 – Indiana Pacers
- Position: Point guard / shooting guard
- League: NBA

Personal information
- Born: September 15, 1998 (age 28) Los Angeles, California, U.S.
- Listed height: 6 ft 4 in (1.93 m)
- Listed weight: 173 lb (78 kg)

Career information
- High school: Mira Costa (Manhattan Beach, California)
- College: College of Central Florida (2017–2019); Texas A&M (2019–2022)
- NBA draft: 2022: undrafted
- Playing career: 2022–present

Career history
- 2022–2023: Capital City Go-Go
- 2023: Washington Wizards
- 2023: →Capital City Go-Go
- 2023–2024: Windy City Bulls
- 2024–present: Indiana Pacers
- 2024–2026: →Indiana Mad Ants/Noblesville Boom
- Stats at NBA.com
- Stats at Basketball Reference

Quenton Jackson (born September 15, 1998) is an American professional basketball player for the Indiana Pacers of the National Basketball Association (NBA). He played college basketball for the College of Central Florida Patriots and the Texas A&M Aggies.

== High school career ==
Jackson attended Mira Costa High School. He missed a month and a half with a wrist injury as a senior.

== College career ==
Jackson began his college career at the College of Central Florida. As a sophomore, he averaged 18.3 points, 5.2 rebounds and three assists per game. Jackson transferred to Texas A&M, choosing the Aggies over Arkansas, LSU, Texas and West Virginia. He averaged 8.8 points and 2.9 rebounds per game as a junior. As a senior, Jackson averaged 10.4 points, 2.4 rebounds and 1.7 assists per game. Following the season, he opted to return for an additional year of eligibility. Jackson led Texas A&M to the NIT final in his last season, averaging 14.8 points, 3.5 rebounds, 2.0 assists and 1.8 steals per game.

== Professional career ==
=== Washington Wizards / Capital City Go-Go (2022–2023) ===
After going undrafted in the 2022 NBA draft, Jackson signed an Exhibit 10 contract with the Washington Wizards on September 13, 2022. He was waived by the Wizards on October 15, and he subsequently joined the Capital City Go-Go, the Wizards' NBA G League affiliate.

On February 10, 2023, Jackson signed a two-way contract with the Wizards. However, he was waived on July 24.

=== Windy City Bulls (2023–2024) ===
On September 8, 2023, Jackson signed with the Chicago Bulls, but was waived on October 16. On November 9, he joined the Windy City Bulls.

=== Indiana Pacers / Mad Ants / Noblesville Boom (2024-present) ===
On March 4, 2024, Jackson signed a two-way contract with the Indiana Pacers.

On July 27, 2024, Jackson signed another two-way contract with the Pacers. Jackson made his first career start on November 21, against the Houston Rockets, and scored a career–high 24 points on 10–of–12 shooting in the 130–113 loss.

Jackson also had a standout performance against the Golden State Warriors on November 1, 2025, in which the Pacers snapped their five game losing streak at the beginning of the season, carried by his 25-point, 10-assist performance. This was a new career-high for Jackson. On February 27, 2026, it was announced that Jackson was signing a three-year, $6.2 million standard contract with the Pacers.

== Career statistics ==
Legend
GP	Games played	GS	Games started	MPG	Minutes per game
FG%	Field goal percentage	3P%	3-point field goal percentage	FT%	Free throw percentage
RPG	Rebounds per game	APG	Assists per game	SPG	Steals per game
BPG	Blocks per game	PPG	Points per game	**Bold**	Career high

=== NBA ===
Year	Team	GP	GS	MPG	FG%	3P%	FT%	RPG	APG	SPG	BPG	PPG
2022–23	Washington	9	0	15.0	.452	.083	.773	.9	1.7	.4	.1	6.2
2023–24	Indiana	3	0	3.5	.000	—	**1.000**	1.3	.7	.3	.0	.7
2024–25	Indiana	28	7	13.6	**.475**	**.375**	.775	1.6	1.9	**.8**	**.2**	5.8
2025–26	Indiana	**49**	**19**	**18.3**	.470	.356	.824	**2.3**	**2.9**	.6	.1	**9.1**
Career		89	26	16.0	.469	.341	.809	1.9	2.4	.6	.1	7.5

=== College ===
Year	Team	GP	GS	MPG	FG%	3P%	FT%	RPG	APG	SPG	BPG	PPG
2019–20	Texas A&M	29	8	23.6	.366	.244	.760	2.9	1.6	1.2	0.2	8.8
2020–21	Texas A&M	18	10	23.4	.474	**.411**	.736	2.4	1.7	1.2	0.2	10.4
2021–22	Texas A&M	**40**	**15**	**26.4**	**.490**	.346	**.828**	**3.5**	**2.0**	**1.8**	**0.6**	**14.8**
Career		87	33	24.8	.453	.330	.793	3.1	1.8	1.5	0.4	11.9
