= 2023–24 Indiana Pacers season =

2023–24 NBA season by team

- Head coach: Rick Carlisle
- President: Kevin Pritchard
- General manager: Chad Buchanan
- Owner: Herbert Simon
- Arena: Gainbridge Fieldhouse

Results
- Record: 47–35 (.573)
- Place: Division: 3rd (Central); Conference: 6th (Eastern)
- Playoff finish: Conference finals (lost to Celtics 0–4)
- Stats at Basketball Reference

Local media
- Television: Bally Sports Indiana
- Radio: 1070 The Fan

The 2023–24 Indiana Pacers season was the 57th season of the franchise and the 48th season in the National Basketball Association (NBA). Rick Carlisle returned for his 7th season as head coach while the franchise hired former Pacers Jim Boylen and Shayne Whittington as assistants. The season was highlighted by making the 2023 NBA In-Season Tournament Championship Game, the acquisition of Pascal Siakam, and making the Eastern Conference Finals.

During the 2023 NBA draft, the franchise most notably acquired Jarace Walker with the 8th overall selection. On July 1, 2023, Tyrese Haliburton agreed to a max contract extension with the Pacers worth up to $260 million over five years. During the offseason, the team acquired the services of Obi Toppin and Bruce Brown. The team advanced to the knockout stage of the 2023 NBA In-Season Tournament after winning East Group A with an undefeated 4–0 record. They defeated the Boston Celtics in the quarterfinals and the Milwaukee Bucks in the semifinals before falling to the Los Angeles Lakers in the championship game.

On January 17, 2024, the Pacers acquired All-NBA Forward Pascal Siakam from the Toronto Raptors in exchange for Bruce Brown, Jordan Nwora, Kira Lewis Jr., and three first–round draft picks. On February 8, 2024, after failing to reach a contract extension, Buddy Hield was traded to the Philadelphia 76ers in a three–team deal involving the San Antonio Spurs, in which the Pacers re–acquired Doug McDermott and draft compensation.

On November 4, 2023, Haliburton tied a career–high 43 points and added 12 assists, becoming the first player in Pacers franchise history to record at least 40+ points and 10+ assists in a game. On November 6, 2023, head coach Rick Carlisle earned his 900th career win, in a 152–111 win over rookie Victor Wembanyama, Gregg Popovich, and the San Antonio Spurs.

After defeating the Atlanta Hawks in the season finale, the Pacers clinched their first playoff berth since 2020. The Pacers faced the Milwaukee Bucks in the first round and won in six games, securing their first series win since their 2014 season. Despite going down 0–2 in the second round against the New York Knicks, the Pacers would respond with back-to-back blowout wins in Games 6 and 7, advancing to their first Eastern Conference finals since the aforementioned 2014 postseason, where they would go on to be swept by the eventual champion Boston Celtics.

The Indiana Pacers drew an average home attendance of 16,525 in 41 home games in the 2023–24 NBA season.

== Draft ==
| Round | Pick | Player | Position(s) | Nationality | College / Club |
|---|---|---|---|---|---|
| 1 | 7 | Bilal Coulibaly | SF | France | Metropolitans 92 (France) |
| 1 | 26 | Ben Sheppard | SG | United States | Belmont (Sr.) |
| 1 | 29 | Julian Strawther | SF | Puerto Rico; United States | Gonzaga (Jr.) |
| 2 | 32 | Jalen Pickett | PG | United States | Penn State |
| 2 | 55 | Isaiah Wong | PG/SG | United States | Miami (FL) (Sr.) |

The Pacers entered the draft with three first-round picks and two second-round picks. All selections were acquired through previous trades, except for the 7th pick. Following several trades during the 2023 NBA draft, the Pacers walked away with the 8th pick Jarace Walker, the 26th pick Ben Sheppard, the 47th pick Mojave King, and the 55th pick Isaiah Wong.

== Roster ==
2023–24 Indiana Pacers roster
Players

| Pos. | No. | Player | Height | Weight | DOB | From |
|---|---|---|---|---|---|---|
| G/F | 10 | Kendall Brown | 6 ft 7 in (2.01 m) | 205 lb (93 kg) | 2003-05-11 | Baylor |
| G | 0 | Tyrese Haliburton (injured) | 6 ft 5 in (1.96 m) | 185 lb (84 kg) | 2000-02-29 | Iowa State |
| F | 22 | Isaiah Jackson | 6 ft 10 in (2.08 m) | 205 lb (93 kg) | 2002-01-10 | Kentucky |
| G | 29 | Quenton Jackson (TW) | 6 ft 5 in (1.96 m) | 173 lb (78 kg) | 1998-09-15 | Texas A&M |
| F | 16 | James Johnson | 6 ft 7 in (2.01 m) | 240 lb (109 kg) | 1987-02-20 | Wake Forest |
| G/F | 00 | Bennedict Mathurin (injured) | 6 ft 5 in (1.96 m) | 210 lb (95 kg) | 2002-06-19 | Arizona |
| G | 9 | T. J. McConnell | 6 ft 1 in (1.85 m) | 190 lb (86 kg) | 1992-03-25 | Arizona |
| F | 20 | Doug McDermott | 6 ft 6 in (1.98 m) | 225 lb (102 kg) | 1992-01-03 | Creighton |
| G | 2 | Andrew Nembhard | 6 ft 4 in (1.93 m) | 191 lb (87 kg) | 2000-01-16 | Gonzaga |
| G/F | 23 | Aaron Nesmith | 6 ft 6 in (1.98 m) | 215 lb (98 kg) | 1999-10-16 | Vanderbilt |
| G | 26 | Ben Sheppard | 6 ft 6 in (1.98 m) | 190 lb (86 kg) | 2001-07-16 | Belmont |
| F | 43 | Pascal Siakam | 6 ft 8 in (2.03 m) | 245 lb (111 kg) | 1994-04-02 | New Mexico State |
| F/C | 25 | Jalen Smith | 6 ft 10 in (2.08 m) | 215 lb (98 kg) | 2000-03-16 | Maryland |
| F | 1 | Obi Toppin | 6 ft 9 in (2.06 m) | 220 lb (100 kg) | 1998-03-04 | Dayton |
| C | 44 | Oscar Tshiebwe (TW) | 6 ft 8 in (2.03 m) | 255 lb (116 kg) | 1999-11-27 | Kentucky |
| C | 33 | Myles Turner (C) | 6 ft 11 in (2.11 m) | 250 lb (113 kg) | 1996-03-24 | Texas |
| F | 5 | Jarace Walker | 6 ft 7 in (2.01 m) | 235 lb (107 kg) | 2003-09-04 | Houston |
| G | 21 | Isaiah Wong (TW) | 6 ft 3 in (1.91 m) | 185 lb (84 kg) | 2001-01-28 | Miami (FL) |

Coaches
Head coach
- Rick Carlisle
Assistant(s)
- Maurice Baker
- Jenny Boucek
- Jim Boylen
- Jannero Pargo
- Lloyd Pierce
- Mike Weinar
- Shayne Whittington

Legend
- (DP) Unsigned draft pick
- (FA) Free agent
- (S) Suspended
- (GL) On assignment to G League affiliate
- (TW) Two-way affiliate player
- Injured

Roster
Updated: April 3, 2024

== Standings ==
=== Division ===
| Central Division | W | L | PCT | GB | Home | Road | Div | GP |
|---|---|---|---|---|---|---|---|---|
| y – Milwaukee Bucks | 49 | 33 | .598 | – | 31‍–‍11 | 18‍–‍22 | 10‍–‍7 | 82 |
| x – Cleveland Cavaliers | 48 | 34 | .585 | 1.0 | 26‍–‍15 | 22‍–‍19 | 11‍–‍5 | 82 |
| x – Indiana Pacers | 47 | 35 | .573 | 2.0 | 26‍–‍15 | 21‍–‍20 | 11‍–‍6 | 82 |
| pi – Chicago Bulls | 39 | 43 | .476 | 10.0 | 20‍–‍21 | 19‍–‍22 | 7‍–‍9 | 82 |
| Detroit Pistons | 14 | 68 | .171 | 35.0 | 7‍–‍33 | 7‍–‍35 | 2‍–‍14 | 82 |

=== Conference ===
Eastern Conference
| # | Team | W | L | PCT | GB | GP |
|---|---|---|---|---|---|---|
| 1 | z – Boston Celtics * | 64 | 18 | .780 | – | 82 |
| 2 | x – New York Knicks | 50 | 32 | .610 | 14.0 | 82 |
| 3 | y – Milwaukee Bucks * | 49 | 33 | .598 | 15.0 | 82 |
| 4 | x – Cleveland Cavaliers | 48 | 34 | .585 | 16.0 | 82 |
| 5 | y – Orlando Magic * | 47 | 35 | .573 | 17.0 | 82 |
| 6 | x – Indiana Pacers | 47 | 35 | .573 | 17.0 | 82 |
| 7 | x – Philadelphia 76ers | 47 | 35 | .573 | 17.0 | 82 |
| 8 | x – Miami Heat | 46 | 36 | .561 | 18.0 | 82 |
| 9 | pi – Chicago Bulls | 39 | 43 | .476 | 25.0 | 82 |
| 10 | pi – Atlanta Hawks | 36 | 46 | .439 | 28.0 | 82 |
| 11 | Brooklyn Nets | 32 | 50 | .390 | 32.0 | 82 |
| 12 | Toronto Raptors | 25 | 57 | .305 | 39.0 | 82 |
| 13 | Charlotte Hornets | 21 | 61 | .256 | 43.0 | 82 |
| 14 | Washington Wizards | 15 | 67 | .183 | 49.0 | 82 |
| 15 | Detroit Pistons | 14 | 68 | .171 | 50.0 | 82 |

== Game log ==
=== Preseason ===
2023 preseason game log
Total: 2–2 (Home: 2–0; Road: 0–2)
Preseason: 2–2 (home: 2–0; road: 0–2)

| Game | Date | Team | Score | High points | High rebounds | High assists | Location Attendance | Record |
|---|---|---|---|---|---|---|---|---|
| 1 | October 8 | @ Memphis | L 122–127 (OT) | Jarace Walker (19) | Jarace Walker (9) | T. J. McConnell (8) | FedExForum; 14,403 | 0–1 |
| 2 | October 10 | @ Houston | L 103–122 | Aaron Nesmith (18) | Smith, Toppin (6) | Buddy Hield (9) | Toyota Center; 12,680 | 0–2 |
| 3 | October 16 | Atlanta | W 116–112 | Haliburton, Nesmith (15) | Jalen Smith (7) | T. J. McConnell (9) | Gainbridge Fieldhouse; 8,976 | 1–2 |
| 4 | October 20 | Cleveland | W 109–104 | Buddy Hield (20) | Toppin, Turner (9) | Tyrese Haliburton (9) | Gainbridge Fieldhouse; 10,470 | 2–2 |

2023–24 preseason schedule

=== Regular season ===
This became the first regular season where all the NBA teams competed in a mid-season tournament setting due to the implementation of the 2023 NBA In-Season Tournament.

2023–24 game log
Total: 47–35 (Home: 26–15; Road: 21–20)
October: 2–1 (home: 1–1; road: 1–0)

| Game | Date | Team | Score | High points | High rebounds | High assists | Location Attendance | Record |
|---|---|---|---|---|---|---|---|---|
| 1 | October 25 | Washington | W 143–120 | Bruce Brown (24) | Smith, Turner (8) | Tyrese Haliburton (11) | Gainbridge Fieldhouse; 16,004 | 1–0 |
| 2 | October 28 | @ Cleveland | W 125–113 | Aaron Nesmith (26) | Myles Turner (12) | Tyrese Haliburton (13) | Rocket Mortgage FieldHouse; 19,432 | 2–0 |
| 3 | October 30 | Chicago | L 105–112 | Myles Turner (20) | Myles Turner (11) | Tyrese Haliburton (13) | Gainbridge Fieldhouse; 15,021 | 2–1 |

November: 7–7 (home: 5–4; road: 2–3)

| Game | Date | Team | Score | High points | High rebounds | High assists | Location Attendance | Record |
|---|---|---|---|---|---|---|---|---|
| 4 | November 1 | @ Boston | L 104–155 | T. J. McConnell (18) | T. J. McConnell (7) | Hield, McConnell (5) | TD Garden; 19,156 | 2–2 |
| 5 | November 3 | Cleveland | W 121–116 | Myles Turner (27) | Myles Turner (9) | Tyrese Haliburton (13) | Gainbridge Fieldhouse; 16,744 | 3–2 |
| 6 | November 4 | Charlotte | L 124–125 | Tyrese Haliburton (43) | Jalen Smith (9) | Tyrese Haliburton (12) | Gainbridge Fieldhouse; 15,945 | 3–3 |
| 7 | November 6 | San Antonio | W 152–111 | Tyrese Haliburton (23) | Myles Turner (11) | Haliburton, Nembhard (8) | Gainbridge Fieldhouse; 15,129 | 4–3 |
| 8 | November 8 | Utah | W 134–118 | Aaron Nesmith (24) | Jalen Smith (11) | Tyrese Haliburton (13) | Gainbridge Fieldhouse; 14,509 | 5–3 |
| 9 | November 9 | Milwaukee | W 126–124 | Tyrese Haliburton (29) | Bennedict Mathurin (11) | Tyrese Haliburton (10) | Gainbridge Fieldhouse; 14,648 | 6–3 |
| 10 | November 12 | @ Philadelphia | L 126–137 | Tyrese Haliburton (25) | Jalen Smith (6) | Tyrese Haliburton (17) | Wells Fargo Center; 19,758 | 6–4 |
| 11 | November 14 | @ Philadelphia | W 132–126 | Tyrese Haliburton (33) | Isaiah Jackson (9) | Tyrese Haliburton (15) | Wells Fargo Center; 19,774 | 7–4 |
| 12 | November 19 | Orlando | L 116–128 | Jordan Nwora (19) | Bennedict Mathurin (6) | T.J. McConnell (5) | Gainbridge Fieldhouse; 17,276 | 7–5 |
| 13 | November 21 | @ Atlanta | W 157–152 | Tyrese Haliburton (37) | Myles Turner (9) | Tyrese Haliburton (16) | State Farm Arena; 17,162 | 8–5 |
| 14 | November 22 | Toronto | L 131–132 | Tyrese Haliburton (33) | Myles Turner (8) | Tyrese Haliburton (16) | Gainbridge Fieldhouse; 17,091 | 8–6 |
| 15 | November 24 | Detroit | W 136–113 | Tyrese Haliburton (26) | Myles Turner (10) | Tyrese Haliburton (10) | Gainbridge Fieldhouse; 17,274 | 9–6 |
| 16 | November 27 | Portland | L 110–114 | Tyrese Haliburton (33) | Myles Turner (8) | Tyrese Haliburton (9) | Gainbridge Fieldhouse; 14,508 | 9–7 |
| 17 | November 30 | @ Miami | L 132–142 | Tyrese Haliburton (44) | Myles Turner (9) | Tyrese Haliburton (10) | Kaseya Center; 19,604 | 9–8 |

December: 8–6 (home: 3–2; road: 5–4)

| Game | Date | Team | Score | High points | High rebounds | High assists | Location Attendance | Record |
|---|---|---|---|---|---|---|---|---|
| 18 | December 2 | @ Miami | W 144–129 | Bruce Brown (30) | Myles Turner (10) | McConnell, Nembhard (11) | Kaseya Center; 19,650 | 10–8 |
| 19 | December 4 | Boston | W 122–112 | Tyrese Haliburton (26) | Turner, Haliburton (10) | Tyrese Haliburton (13) | Gainbridge Fieldhouse; 16,693 | 11–8 |
| 20 | December 7 | @ Milwaukee | W 128–119 | Tyrese Haliburton (27) | Buddy Hield (11) | Tyrese Haliburton (15) | T-Mobile Arena; 16,837 | 12–8 |
| | December 9 | @ L.A. Lakers | L 109–123 | Haliburton, Mathurin (20) | Myles Turner (7) | Tyrese Haliburton (11) | T-Mobile Arena; 19,021 | |
| 21 | December 11 | @ Detroit | W 131–123 | Bennedict Mathurin (30) | Bruce Brown (9) | Tyrese Haliburton (16) | Little Caesars Arena; 14,988 | 13–8 |
| 22 | December 13 | @ Milwaukee | L 126–140 | Haliburton, Turner (22) | Myles Turner (9) | Bruce Brown (9) | Fiserv Forum; 17,431 | 13–9 |
| 23 | December 15 | @ Washington | L 123–137 | Isaiah Jackson (20) | Isaiah Jackson (13) | Tyrese Haliburton (11) | Capital One Arena; 15,208 | 13–10 |
| 24 | December 16 | @ Minnesota | L 109–127 | B. Brown, Nesmith (17) | B. Brown, Nesmith, Turner (5) | T. J. McConnell (6) | Target Center; 18,024 | 13–11 |
| 25 | December 18 | L.A. Clippers | L 127–151 | Bennedict Mathurin (34) | Mathurin, Nesmith (6) | Tyrese Haliburton (11) | Gainbridge Fieldhouse; 16,665 | 13–12 |
| 26 | December 20 | Charlotte | W 144–113 | Buddy Hield (25) | Myles Turner (6) | Tyrese Haliburton (13) | Gainbridge Fieldhouse; 16,761 | 14–12 |
| 27 | December 21 | @ Memphis | L 103–116 | Obi Toppin (22) | Hield, Turner (6) | Tyrese Haliburton (14) | FedExForum; 18,160 | 14–13 |
| 28 | December 23 | Orlando | L 110–117 | Tyrese Haliburton (29) | Hield, Turner (7) | Tyrese Haliburton (14) | Gainbridge Fieldhouse; 17,274 | 14–14 |
| 29 | December 26 | @ Houston | W 123–117 | Tyrese Haliburton (33) | Jackson, Smith (8) | Tyrese Haliburton (10) | Toyota Center; 18,055 | 15–14 |
| 30 | December 28 | @ Chicago | W 120–104 | Myles Turner (24) | Obi Toppin (12) | Tyrese Haliburton (20) | United Center; 21,568 | 16–14 |
| 31 | December 30 | New York | W 140–126 | Myles Turner (28) | Toppin, Turner (8) | Tyrese Haliburton (23) | Gainbridge Fieldhouse; 17,274 | 17–14 |

January: 10–7 (home: 7–2; road: 3–5)

| Game | Date | Team | Score | High points | High rebounds | High assists | Location Attendance | Record |
|---|---|---|---|---|---|---|---|---|
| 32 | January 1 | @ Milwaukee | W 122–113 | Tyrese Haliburton (26) | Bennedict Mathurin (13) | Tyrese Haliburton (11) | Fiserv Forum; 17,922 | 18–14 |
| 33 | January 3 | Milwaukee | W 142–130 | Tyrese Haliburton (31) | Obi Toppin (8) | Tyrese Haliburton (12) | Gainbridge Fieldhouse; 17,274 | 19–14 |
| 34 | January 5 | Atlanta | W 150–116 | Myles Turner (27) | Tyrese Haliburton (8) | Tyrese Haliburton (18) | Gainbridge Fieldhouse; 17,274 | 20–14 |
| 35 | January 6 | Boston | L 101–118 | Bennedict Mathurin (20) | Smith, Turner (7) | Tyrese Haliburton (7) | Gainbridge Fieldhouse; 17,274 | 20–15 |
| 36 | January 8 | Boston | W 133–131 | Bennedict Mathurin (26) | Jalen Smith (9) | T. J. McConnell (7) | Gainbridge Fieldhouse; 16,009 | 21–15 |
| 37 | January 10 | Washington | W 112–104 | Myles Turner (18) | Myles Turner (13) | T. J. McConnell (8) | Gainbridge Fieldhouse; 15,721 | 22–15 |
| 38 | January 12 | @ Atlanta | W 126–108 | Hield, Toppin (18) | Smith, Toppin, Turner (7) | T. J. McConnell (14) | State Farm Arena; 15,596 | 23–15 |
| 39 | January 14 | @ Denver | L 109–117 | Bruce Brown (18) | Bruce Brown (10) | Andrew Nembhard (7) | Ball Arena; 19,631 | 23–16 |
| 40 | January 15 | @ Utah | L 105–132 | Hield, Nembhard (14) | Jalen Smith (6) | T. J. McConnell (5) | Delta Center; 18,206 | 23–17 |
| 41 | January 18 | @ Sacramento | W 126–121 | Bennedict Mathurin (25) | Jalen Smith (13) | T. J. McConnell (10) | Golden 1 Center; 17,832 | 24–17 |
| 42 | January 19 | @ Portland | L 115–118 | Myles Turner (29) | Myles Turner (12) | Tyrese Haliburton (17) | Moda Center; 18,595 | 24–18 |
| 43 | January 21 | @ Phoenix | L 110–117 | Buddy Hield (18) | Jarace Walker (9) | Pascal Siakam (7) | Footprint Center; 17,071 | 24–19 |
| 44 | January 23 | Denver | L 109–114 | Myles Turner (22) | Pascal Siakam (10) | McConnell, Nembhard (7) | Gainbridge Fieldhouse; 16,004 | 24–20 |
| 45 | January 25 | Philadelphia | W 134–122 | Pascal Siakam (26) | Pascal Siakam (13) | Pascal Siakam (10) | Gainbridge Fieldhouse; 15,699 | 25–20 |
| 46 | January 26 | Phoenix | W 133–131 | Pascal Siakam (31) | Obi Toppin (11) | McConnell, Nembhard (8) | Gainbridge Fieldhouse; 17,274 | 26–20 |
| 47 | January 28 | Memphis | W 116–110 | Bennedict Mathurin (24) | Jalen Smith (10) | Andrew Nembhard (9) | Gainbridge Fieldhouse; 16,519 | 27–20 |
| 48 | January 30 | @ Boston | L 124–129 | Aaron Nesmith (26) | Aaron Nesmith (12) | Tyrese Haliburton (10) | TD Garden; 19,156 | 27–21 |

February: 7–5 (home: 4–3; road: 3–2)

| Game | Date | Team | Score | High points | High rebounds | High assists | Location Attendance | Record |
|---|---|---|---|---|---|---|---|---|
| 49 | February 1 | @ New York | L 105–109 | Jalen Smith (20) | Jalen Smith (9) | Andrew Nembhard (6) | Madison Square Garden; 19,812 | 27–22 |
| 50 | February 2 | Sacramento | L 122–133 | Bennedict Mathurin (31) | Isaiah Jackson (8) | T. J. McConnell (7) | Gainbridge Fieldhouse; 17,274 | 27–23 |
| 51 | February 4 | @ Charlotte | W 115–99 | Pascal Siakam (25) | Myles Turner (10) | Pascal Siakam (9) | Spectrum Center; 15,687 | 28–23 |
| 52 | February 6 | Houston | W 132–129 | Pascal Siakam (29) | Toppin, Siakam (4) | Tyrese Haliburton (7) | Gainbridge Fieldhouse; 15,571 | 29–23 |
| 53 | February 8 | Golden State | L 109–131 | Pascal Siakam (16) | Pascal Siakam (8) | Tyrese Haliburton (11) | Gainbridge Fieldhouse; 17,274 | 29–24 |
| 54 | February 10 | @ New York | W 125–111 | Myles Turner (23) | Jackson, Turner (8) | Tyrese Haliburton (12) | Madison Square Garden; 19,812 | 30–24 |
| 55 | February 12 | @ Charlotte | L 102–111 | Myles Turner (22) | Tyrese Haliburton (6) | Tyrese Haliburton (12) | Spectrum Center; 12,112 | 30–25 |
| 56 | February 14 | @ Toronto | W 127–125 | Pascal Siakam (23) | Isaiah Jackson (11) | Tyrese Haliburton (12) | Scotiabank Arena; 19,800 | 31–25 |
All-Star Game
| 57 | February 22 | Detroit | W 129–115 | Tyrese Haliburton (25) | Myles Turner (11) | Tyrese Haliburton (13) | Gainbridge Fieldhouse; 16,506 | 32–25 |
| 58 | February 25 | Dallas | W 133–111 | Myles Turner (33) | Bennedict Mathurin (11) | Tyrese Haliburton (10) | Gainbridge Fieldhouse; 17,274 | 33–25 |
| 59 | February 26 | Toronto | L 122–130 | Bennedict Mathurin (34) | Myles Turner (11) | Tyrese Haliburton (7) | Gainbridge Fieldhouse; 16,026 | 33–26 |
| 60 | February 28 | New Orleans | W 123–114 | Pascal Siakam (24) | Pascal Siakam (11) | Tyrese Haliburton (13) | Gainbridge Fieldhouse; 16,010 | 34–26 |

March: 8–7 (home: 2–3; road: 6–4)

| Game | Date | Team | Score | High points | High rebounds | High assists | Location Attendance | Record |
|---|---|---|---|---|---|---|---|---|
| 61 | March 1 | @ New Orleans | L 102–129 | Jackson, Mathurin (13) | Isaiah Jackson (11) | Jarace Walker (6) | Smoothie King Center; 17,898 | 34–27 |
| 62 | March 3 | @ San Antonio | L 105–117 | T. J. McConnell (26) | Myles Turner (10) | Tyrese Haliburton (8) | Frost Bank Center; 18,027 | 34–28 |
| 63 | March 5 | @ Dallas | W 137–120 | Myles Turner (20) | Pascal Siakam (13) | Tyrese Haliburton (11) | American Airlines Center; 20,200 | 35–28 |
| 64 | March 7 | Minnesota | L 111–113 | Pascal Siakam (24) | Myles Turner (7) | Tyrese Haliburton (13) | Gainbridge Fieldhouse; 16,580 | 35–29 |
| 65 | March 10 | @ Orlando | W 111–97 | Haliburton, Siakam (20) | Toppin, Turner (8) | Tyrese Haliburton (8) | Kia Center; 19,481 | 36–29 |
| 66 | March 12 | @ Oklahoma City | W 121–111 | Myles Turner (24) | Pascal Siakam (11) | Tyrese Haliburton (12) | Paycom Center; 17,118 | 37–29 |
| 67 | March 13 | Chicago | L 129–132 (OT) | Myles Turner (27) | Pascal Siakam (9) | Tyrese Haliburton (14) | Gainbridge Fieldhouse; 17,274 | 37–30 |
| 68 | March 16 | Brooklyn | W 121–100 | Pascal Siakam (28) | Pascal Siakam (11) | Haliburton, Siakam (4) | Gainbridge Fieldhouse; 17,009 | 38–30 |
| 69 | March 18 | Cleveland | L 103–108 | Pascal Siakam (19) | Pascal Siakam (12) | Tyrese Haliburton (12) | Gainbridge Fieldhouse; 17,274 | 38–31 |
| 70 | March 20 | @ Detroit | W 122–103 | Pascal Siakam (25) | Isaiah Jackson (11) | Tyrese Haliburton (9) | Little Caesars Arena; 19,897 | 39–31 |
| 71 | March 22 | @ Golden State | W 123–111 | Tyrese Haliburton (26) | Pascal Siakam (16) | Tyrese Haliburton (11) | Chase Center; 18,064 | 40–31 |
| 72 | March 24 | @ L.A. Lakers | L 145–150 | Pascal Siakam (36) | Pascal Siakam (12) | Tyrese Haliburton (10) | Crypto.com Arena; 18,997 | 40–32 |
| 73 | March 25 | @ L.A. Clippers | W 133–116 | Pascal Siakam (31) | Myles Turner (7) | Tyrese Haliburton (9) | Crypto.com Arena; 19,370 | 41–32 |
| 74 | March 27 | @ Chicago | L 99–125 | Andrew Nembhard (18) | Pascal Siakam (8) | Haliburton, Siakam (5) | United Center; 22,018 | 41–33 |
| 75 | March 29 | L.A. Lakers | W 109–90 | Pascal Siakam (22) | Pascal Siakam (11) | Tyrese Haliburton (8) | Gainbridge Fieldhouse; 17,274 | 42–33 |

April: 5–2 (home: 4–0; road: 1–2)

| Game | Date | Team | Score | High points | High rebounds | High assists | Location Attendance | Record |
|---|---|---|---|---|---|---|---|---|
| 76 | April 1 | Brooklyn | W 133–111 | Tyrese Haliburton (27) | Jalen Smith (10) | Tyrese Haliburton (13) | Gainbridge Fieldhouse; 16,522 | 43–33 |
| 77 | April 3 | @ Brooklyn | L 111–115 | Pascal Siakam (26) | Siakam, Smith (9) | Tyrese Haliburton (8) | Barclays Center; 17,732 | 43–34 |
| 78 | April 5 | Oklahoma City | W 126–112 | Pascal Siakam (21) | Obi Toppin (8) | Tyrese Haliburton (11) | Gainbridge Fieldhouse; 17,274 | 44–34 |
| 79 | April 7 | Miami | W 117–115 | Turner, McConnell (22) | Myles Turner (13) | Tyrese Haliburton (8) | Gainbridge Fieldhouse; 17,274 | 45–34 |
| 80 | April 9 | @ Toronto | W 140–123 | Tyrese Haliburton (30) | Pascal Siakam (9) | Andrew Nembhard (8) | Scotiabank Arena; 19,325 | 46–34 |
| 81 | April 12 | @ Cleveland | L 120–129 | Haliburton, Siakam (19) | five players (6) | Tyrese Haliburton (12) | Rocket Mortgage FieldHouse; 19,432 | 46–35 |
| 82 | April 14 | Atlanta | W 157–115 | Myles Turner (31) | Myles Turner (12) | Tyrese Haliburton (13) | Gainbridge Fieldhouse; 17,274 | 47–35 |

2023–24 season schedule

=== Playoffs ===
2024 playoff game log
Total: 8–9 (home: 6–2; road: 2–7)
First Round: 4–2 (home: 3–0; road: 1–2)

| Game | Date | Team | Score | High points | High rebounds | High assists | Location Attendance | Series |
|---|---|---|---|---|---|---|---|---|
| 1 | April 21 | @ Milwaukee | L 94–109 | Pascal Siakam (36) | Pascal Siakam (13) | Tyrese Haliburton (8) | Fiserv Forum; 17,341 | 0–1 |
| 2 | April 23 | @ Milwaukee | W 125–108 | Pascal Siakam (37) | Pascal Siakam (11) | Tyrese Haliburton (12) | Fiserv Forum; 17,683 | 1–1 |
| 3 | April 26 | Milwaukee | W 121–118 (OT) | Myles Turner (29) | Tyrese Haliburton (10) | Tyrese Haliburton (16) | Gainbridge Fieldhouse; 17,274 | 2–1 |
| 4 | April 28 | Milwaukee | W 126–113 | Myles Turner (29) | Siakam, Turner (9) | Andrew Nembhard (9) | Gainbridge Fieldhouse; 17,274 | 3–1 |
| 5 | April 30 | @ Milwaukee | L 92–115 | Tyrese Haliburton (16) | Obi Toppin (6) | Tyrese Haliburton (6) | Fiserv Forum; 17,341 | 3–2 |
| 6 | May 2 | Milwaukee | W 120–98 | Obi Toppin (21) | Obi Toppin (8) | Tyrese Haliburton (10) | Gainbridge Fieldhouse; 17,274 | 4–2 |

Conference Semifinals: 4–3 (home: 3–0; road: 1–3)

| Game | Date | Team | Score | High points | High rebounds | High assists | Location Attendance | Series |
|---|---|---|---|---|---|---|---|---|
| 1 | May 6 | @ New York | L 117–121 | Myles Turner (23) | Nesmith, Siakam, Toppin (6) | Tyrese Haliburton (8) | Madison Square Garden; 19,812 | 0–1 |
| 2 | May 8 | @ New York | L 121–130 | Tyrese Haliburton (34) | Pascal Siakam (9) | T. J. McConnell (12) | Madison Square Garden; 19,812 | 0–2 |
| 3 | May 10 | New York | W 111–106 | Tyrese Haliburton (35) | Myles Turner (10) | Tyrese Haliburton (7) | Gainbridge Fieldhouse; 17,274 | 1–2 |
| 4 | May 12 | New York | W 121–89 | Tyrese Haliburton (20) | Aaron Nesmith (12) | T.J. McConnell (10) | Gainbridge Fieldhouse; 17,274 | 2–2 |
| 5 | May 14 | @ New York | L 91–121 | Pascal Siakam (22) | Pascal Siakam (8) | Haliburton, McConnell (5) | Madison Square Garden; 19,812 | 2–3 |
| 6 | May 17 | New York | W 116–103 | Pascal Siakam (25) | Myles Turner (8) | Tyrese Haliburton (9) | Gainbridge Fieldhouse; 17,274 | 3–3 |
| 7 | May 19 | @ New York | W 130–109 | Tyrese Haliburton (26) | Nembhard, Sheppard, Turner (5) | T.J. McConnell (7) | Madison Square Garden; 19,812 | 4–3 |

Conference Finals: 0–4 (home: 0–2; road: 0–2)

| Game | Date | Team | Score | High points | High rebounds | High assists | Location Attendance | Series |
|---|---|---|---|---|---|---|---|---|
| 1 | May 21 | @ Boston | L 128–133 (OT) | Tyrese Haliburton (25) | Pascal Siakam (12) | Tyrese Haliburton (10) | TD Garden; 19,156 | 0–1 |
| 2 | May 23 | @ Boston | L 110–126 | Pascal Siakam (28) | Jackson, McConnell, Siakam (5) | Tyrese Haliburton (8) | TD Garden; 19,156 | 0–2 |
| 3 | May 25 | Boston | L 111–114 | Andrew Nembhard (32) | Myles Turner (10) | Andrew Nembhard (9) | Gainbridge Fieldhouse; 17,274 | 0–3 |
| 4 | May 27 | Boston | L 102–105 | Andrew Nembhard (24) | Pascal Siakam (10) | Andrew Nembhard (10) | Gainbridge Fieldhouse; 17,274 | 0–4 |

2024 playoff schedule

=== In-Season Tournament ===
This was the first regular season where all the NBA teams competed in a mid-season tournament setting, due to the implementation of the 2023 NBA In-Season Tournament. During the in-season tournament period, the Pacers competed in Group A of the Eastern Conference with the Philadelphia 76ers, Cleveland Cavaliers, Atlanta Hawks, and Detroit Pistons. Following high-scoring wins against the Cavaliers, 76ers, and Hawks, the Pacers were automatic winners of Group A in the Eastern Conference before they even played their final in-season tournament game in November against the Pistons. With a 4–0 record, the Pacers qualified for the knockout elimination rounds of the In-Season Tournament. They lost to the Lakers in the final, 123–109.

==== East group A ====
| Pos | Team | Pld | W | L | PF | PA | PD | Qualification | IND | CLE | PHI | ATL | DET |
|---|---|---|---|---|---|---|---|---|---|---|---|---|---|
| 1 | Indiana Pacers | 4 | 4 | 0 | 546 | 507 | +39 | Advance to knockout stage | — | 121–116 | 132–126 | 157–152 | 136–113 |
| 2 | Cleveland Cavaliers | 4 | 3 | 1 | 474 | 445 | +29 | | 116–121 | — | 122–119 (OT) | 128–105 | 108–100 |
| 3 | Philadelphia 76ers | 4 | 2 | 2 | 485 | 476 | +9 | | 126–132 | 119–122 (OT) | — | 126–116 | 114–106 |
| 4 | Atlanta Hawks | 4 | 1 | 3 | 499 | 531 | −32 | | 152–157 | 105–128 | 116–126 | — | 126–120 |
| 5 | Detroit Pistons | 4 | 0 | 4 | 439 | 484 | −45 | | 113–136 | 100–108 | 106–114 | 120–126 | — |

Source: NBA
Rules for classification: Tiebreakers

2023–24 game log
Total: 6–1 (Home: 3–0; Road: 3–1)
In-Season Tournament: 6–1 (home: 3–0; road: 3–1)

| Game | Date | Team | Score | High points | High rebounds | High assists | Location Attendance | Record |
|---|---|---|---|---|---|---|---|---|
| 1 | November 3 | Cleveland | W 121–116 | Myles Turner (27) | Myles Turner (9) | Tyrese Haliburton (13) | Gainbridge Fieldhouse; 16,744 | 1–0 |
| 2 | November 14 | @ Philadelphia | W 132–126 | Tyrese Haliburton (33) | Isaiah Jackson (9) | Tyrese Haliburton (15) | Wells Fargo Center; 19,774 | 2–0 |
| 3 | November 21 | @ Atlanta | W 157–152 | Tyrese Haliburton (37) | Myles Turner (9) | Tyrese Haliburton (16) | State Farm Arena; 17,162 | 3–0 |
| 4 | November 24 | Detroit | W 136–113 | Tyrese Haliburton (26) | Myles Turner (10) | Tyrese Haliburton (10) | Gainbridge Fieldhouse; 17,274 | 4–0 |
| 5 | December 4 | Boston | W 122–112 | Tyrese Haliburton (26) | Turner, Haliburton (10) | Tyrese Haliburton (13) | Gainbridge Fieldhouse; 16,693 | 5–0 |
| 6 | December 7 | @ Milwaukee | W 128–119 | Tyrese Haliburton (27) | Buddy Hield (11) | Tyrese Haliburton (15) | T-Mobile Arena; 16,837 | 6–0 |
| 7 | December 9 | L.A. Lakers | L 109–123 | Haliburton, Mathurin (20) | Myles Turner (7) | Tyrese Haliburton (11) | T-Mobile Arena; 19,021 | 6–1 |

== Player statistics ==
=== Regular season ===
| Player | POS | GP | GS | MP | REB | AST | STL | BLK | PTS | MPG | RPG | APG | SPG | BPG | PPG |
|---|---|---|---|---|---|---|---|---|---|---|---|---|---|---|---|
| Obi Toppin | PF | 82 | 28 | 1,730 | 320 | 128 | 47 | 43 | 843 | 21.1 | 3.9 | 1.6 | .6 | .5 | 10.3 |
| Myles Turner | C | 77 | 77 | 2,076 | 533 | 100 | 39 | 144 | 1,313 | 27.0 | 6.9 | 1.3 | .5 | 1.9 | 17.1 |
| Aaron Nesmith | SF | 72 | 47 | 1,995 | 275 | 108 | 65 | 49 | 877 | 27.7 | 3.8 | 1.5 | .9 | .7 | 12.2 |
| T. J. McConnell | PG | 71 | 4 | 1,291 | 191 | 390 | 72 | 8 | 727 | 18.2 | 2.7 | 5.5 | 1.0 | .1 | 10.2 |
| Tyrese Haliburton | PG | 69 | 68 | 2,224 | 271 | 752 | 83 | 48 | 1,389 | 32.2 | 3.9 | 10.9 | 1.2 | .7 | 20.1 |
| Andrew Nembhard | PG | 68 | 47 | 1,697 | 141 | 280 | 63 | 6 | 626 | 25.0 | 2.1 | 4.1 | .9 | .1 | 9.2 |
| Jalen Smith | C | 61 | 14 | 1,047 | 337 | 63 | 17 | 38 | 601 | 17.2 | 5.5 | 1.0 | .3 | .6 | 9.9 |
| Isaiah Jackson | C | 60 | 3 | 771 | 238 | 50 | 34 | 61 | 383 | 12.9 | 4.0 | .8 | .6 | 1.0 | 6.4 |
| Bennedict Mathurin | SF | 59 | 19 | 1,538 | 234 | 119 | 35 | 14 | 856 | 26.1 | 4.0 | 2.0 | .6 | .2 | 14.5 |
| Ben Sheppard | SG | 57 | 1 | 814 | 89 | 53 | 33 | 2 | 252 | 14.3 | 1.6 | .9 | .6 | .0 | 4.4 |
| Buddy Hield^{†} | SF | 52 | 28 | 1,336 | 167 | 139 | 43 | 31 | 623 | 25.7 | 3.2 | 2.7 | .8 | .6 | 12.0 |
| Pascal Siakam^{†} | PF | 41 | 41 | 1,303 | 319 | 152 | 31 | 15 | 872 | 31.8 | 7.8 | 3.7 | .8 | .4 | 21.3 |
| Bruce Brown^{†} | SG | 33 | 33 | 981 | 154 | 100 | 35 | 8 | 398 | 29.7 | 4.7 | 3.0 | 1.1 | .2 | 12.1 |
| Jarace Walker | PF | 33 | 0 | 340 | 63 | 40 | 15 | 11 | 120 | 10.3 | 1.9 | 1.2 | .5 | .3 | 3.6 |
| Doug McDermott^{†} | SF | 18 | 0 | 204 | 11 | 13 | 5 | 0 | 75 | 11.3 | .6 | .7 | .3 | .0 | 4.2 |
| Jordan Nwora^{†} | SF | 18 | 0 | 183 | 33 | 18 | 6 | 1 | 94 | 10.2 | 1.8 | 1.0 | .3 | .1 | 5.2 |
| Kendall Brown | SG | 15 | 0 | 63 | 5 | 5 | 0 | 0 | 21 | 4.2 | .3 | .3 | .0 | .0 | 1.4 |
| James Johnson | PF | 9 | 0 | 47 | 4 | 8 | 5 | 1 | 8 | 5.2 | .4 | .9 | .6 | .1 | .9 |
| Oscar Tshiebwe | PF | 8 | 0 | 42 | 16 | 2 | 2 | 1 | 26 | 5.3 | 2.0 | .3 | .3 | .1 | 3.3 |
| Quenton Jackson | PG | 3 | 0 | 11 | 4 | 2 | 1 | 0 | 2 | 3.7 | 1.3 | .7 | .3 | .0 | .7 |
| Daniel Theis^{†} | C | 1 | 0 | 8 | 0 | 0 | 0 | 0 | 2 | 8.0 | .0 | .0 | .0 | .0 | 2.0 |
| Isaiah Wong | SG | 1 | 0 | 4 | 0 | 0 | 0 | 0 | 2 | 4.0 | .0 | .0 | .0 | .0 | 2.0 |

- ^{†} Denotes player spent time with another team in the season. Stats reflect time with the Pacers only.

=== Playoffs ===
| Player | POS | GP | GS | MP | REB | AST | STL | BLK | PTS | MPG | RPG | APG | SPG | BPG | PPG |
|---|---|---|---|---|---|---|---|---|---|---|---|---|---|---|---|
| Pascal Siakam | PF | 17 | 17 | 603 | 128 | 64 | 13 | 7 | 367 | 35.5 | 7.5 | 3.8 | .8 | .4 | 21.6 |
| Aaron Nesmith | SF | 17 | 17 | 559 | 84 | 37 | 11 | 9 | 178 | 32.9 | 4.9 | 2.2 | .6 | .5 | 10.5 |
| Andrew Nembhard | PG | 17 | 17 | 554 | 56 | 94 | 6 | 4 | 253 | 32.6 | 3.3 | 5.5 | .4 | .2 | 14.9 |
| Myles Turner | C | 17 | 17 | 550 | 113 | 36 | 8 | 25 | 289 | 32.4 | 6.6 | 2.1 | .5 | 1.5 | 17.0 |
| Ben Sheppard | SG | 17 | 2 | 335 | 51 | 17 | 8 | 1 | 88 | 19.7 | 3.0 | 1.0 | .5 | .1 | 5.2 |
| T. J. McConnell | PG | 17 | 0 | 348 | 52 | 86 | 15 | 2 | 200 | 20.5 | 3.1 | 5.1 | .9 | .1 | 11.8 |
| Obi Toppin | PF | 17 | 0 | 343 | 75 | 29 | 6 | 6 | 185 | 20.2 | 4.4 | 1.7 | .4 | .4 | 10.9 |
| Tyrese Haliburton | PG | 15 | 15 | 522 | 72 | 123 | 19 | 10 | 280 | 34.8 | 4.8 | 8.2 | 1.3 | .7 | 18.7 |
| Isaiah Jackson | C | 15 | 0 | 154 | 48 | 7 | 3 | 13 | 57 | 10.3 | 3.2 | .5 | .2 | .9 | 3.8 |
| Doug McDermott | SF | 10 | 0 | 64 | 3 | 7 | 0 | 2 | 13 | 6.4 | .3 | .7 | .0 | .2 | 1.3 |
| Jarace Walker | PF | 9 | 0 | 31 | 4 | 4 | 2 | 1 | 8 | 3.4 | .4 | .4 | .2 | .1 | .9 |
| Jalen Smith | C | 7 | 0 | 42 | 14 | 2 | 2 | 1 | 13 | 6.0 | 2.0 | .3 | .3 | .1 | 1.9 |
| Kendall Brown | SG | 7 | 0 | 25 | 3 | 2 | 0 | 1 | 4 | 3.6 | .4 | .3 | .0 | .1 | .6 |
| James Johnson | PF | 1 | 0 | 1 | 0 | 0 | 0 | 0 | 1 | 1.0 | .0 | .0 | .0 | .0 | 1.0 |

== Transactions ==
=== Trades ===
| June 23, 2023 (Four-team trade) | To Indiana Pacers Mojave King (No. 47) (from Los Angeles); 2024 OKC first-round pick (from Oklahoma City) (Isaiah Collier); Cash considerations (from Los Angeles) | To Denver Nuggets Julian Strawther (No. 29) (from Indiana); Jalen Pickett (No. 32) (from Indiana); Hunter Tyson (No. 37) (from Oklahoma City); 2024 MIN second-round pick (from Oklahoma City) (Kevin McCullar Jr.) |
| June 23, 2023 (Four-team trade) | To L.A. Lakers Maxwell Lewis (No. 40) (from Denver) | To Oklahoma City Thunder 2029 DEN protected first-round pick (from Denver) |
| June 24, 2023 | To Indiana Pacers Draft rights to Jarace Walker (No. 8) (from Washington); 2028 second-round pick (from Phoenix); 2029 second-round pick (from Washington) | To Phoenix Suns Bradley Beal (from Washington); Jordan Goodwin (from Washington); Isaiah Todd (from Washington) |
| June 24, 2023 | To Washington Wizards Chris Paul (from Phoenix); Landry Shamet (from Phoenix); Draft rights to Bilal Coulibaly (No. 7) (from Indiana); Right to swap 2024 first-round pick with Phoenix; Right to swap 2026 first-round pick with Phoenix; Right to swap 2028 first-round pick with Phoenix; Right to swap 2030 first-round pick with Phoenix; 2024 second-round pick (from Phoenix); 2025 second-round pick (from Phoenix); 2026 second-round pick (from Phoenix); 2027 second-round pick (from Phoenix); 2030 second-round pick (from Phoenix); Cash considerations (from Phoenix) |
| July 6, 2023 | To Indiana Pacers 2028 DAL second-round pick 2030 SAC second-round pick | To Sacramento Kings Chris Duarte |
| July 7, 2023 | To Indiana Pacers Obi Toppin | To New York Knicks 2028 IND or PHX second-round pick 2029 IND or WAS second-round pick |
| January 17, 2024 | To Indiana Pacers Kira Lewis Jr. 2024 NOP second-round pick (Enrique Freeman) | To New Orleans Pelicans Cash considerations |
| January 17, 2024 | To Indiana Pacers Pascal Siakam | To Toronto Raptors Bruce Brown; Kira Lewis Jr. Jordan Nwora; 2024 IND first-round pick (Ja'Kobe Walter); 2024 OKC first-round pick (Isaiah Collier); 2026 IND conditional first-round pick |
| February 8, 2024 | To Indiana Pacers Marcus Morris; Furkan Korkmaz; 2024 TOR second-round pick (Juan Núñez); 2029 POR second-round pick 2029 LAC second-round pick | To Philadelphia 76ers Buddy Hield |
| February 8, 2024 | To Indiana Pacers Doug McDermott | To San Antonio Spurs Marcus Morris; 2029 LAC second-round pick |
| February 8, 2024 | To Indiana Pacers Cory Joseph; 2025 CHA second-round pick Cash considerations | To Golden State Warriors 2024 MIL second-round pick (Quinten Post) |

=== Free agency ===
==== Re-signed ====
| Player | Signed | Ref. |
|---|---|---|
| James Johnson | December 15 | |

==== Additions ====
| Player | Signed | Former Team | Ref. |
|---|---|---|---|
| Oscar Tshiebwe | July 3 (Two-way contract) | Kentucky Wildcats | |
| Bruce Brown | July 6 | Denver Nuggets | |

==== Subtractions ====
| Player | Reason | New Team | Ref. |
|---|---|---|---|
| Oshae Brissett | Free agency | Boston Celtics | |
| Daniel Theis | Waived | Los Angeles Clippers | |
| James Johnson | Waived | Indiana Pacers | |
| Cory Joseph | Waived | Orlando Magic | |
| Furkan Korkmaz | Waived | AS Monaco | |
