= 2022–23 Indiana Pacers season =

2022–23 NBA season by team

- Head coach: Rick Carlisle
- President: Kevin Pritchard
- General manager: Chad Buchanan
- Owner: Herbert Simon
- Arena: Gainbridge Fieldhouse

Results
- Record: 35–47 (.427)
- Place: Division: 4th (Central); Conference: 11th (Eastern)
- Playoff finish: Did not qualify
- Stats at Basketball Reference

Local media
- Television: Bally Sports Indiana
- Radio: 1070 The Fan

The 2022–23 Indiana Pacers season was the 56th season of the franchise and the 47th season in the National Basketball Association (NBA). Rick Carlisle served his 6th season as head coach of the franchise. During the offseason, the team signed restricted free-agent Deandre Ayton to a four–year, $133 million offer sheet, the largest in league history, before it was matched by the Phoenix Suns. The team also traded away Malcolm Brogdon in exchange for a package surrounding Aaron Nesmith, Daniel Theis, and a 2023 first–round pick. In the 2022 NBA draft, the team selected Bennedict Mathurin 6th overall alongside standout second rounder Andrew Nembhard.

Tyrese Haliburton earned his first NBA All–Star appearance in 2023 while also participating in the 2023 NBA Three–Point Contest alongside teammate Buddy Hield. During the season, Hield broke Reggie Miller's record of most three-pointers made in a season in Pacers history. The team acquired Jordan Nwora and former Pacer George Hill at the trade deadline. Bennedict Mathurin broke Chris Duarte's record for most three–pointers made as a rookie in Pacers franchise history.

The Pacers were eliminated from postseason contention on April 2, 2023, following their loss to the Cleveland Cavaliers and the Chicago Bulls’ win over the Memphis Grizzlies.

== Draft ==
Round	Pick	Player	Position(s)	Nationality	College / Club
1	6	Bennedict Mathurin	Shooting guard / small forward	Canada	Arizona
2	31	Andrew Nembhard	Point guard	Canada	Gonzaga
2	58	Hugo Besson	Point guard	France	New Zealand Breakers

The Pacers owned their first-round pick. They also had two second-round picks, due to trades surrounding Jalen Smith and Caris LeVert.

== Roster ==
2022–23 Indiana Pacers roster
Players

Pos.	No.	Player	Height	Weight	DOB	From
F	12	Oshae Brissett	6 ft 7 in (2.01 m)	210 lb (95 kg)	1998-06-20	Syracuse
G	10	Kendall Brown (injured) (TW)	6 ft 7 in (2.01 m)	205 lb (93 kg)	2003-05-11	Baylor
G	3	Chris Duarte (injured)	6 ft 6 in (1.98 m)	190 lb (86 kg)	1997-06-13	Oregon
G	0	Tyrese Haliburton	6 ft 5 in (1.96 m)	185 lb (84 kg)	2000-02-29	Iowa State
G	24	Buddy Hield	6 ft 4 in (1.93 m)	220 lb (100 kg)	1992-12-17	Oklahoma
G	7	George Hill	6 ft 4 in (1.93 m)	188 lb (85 kg)	1986-05-04	IUPUI
F	22	Isaiah Jackson	6 ft 10 in (2.08 m)	205 lb (93 kg)	2002-01-10	Kentucky
F	16	James Johnson	6 ft 7 in (2.01 m)	240 lb (109 kg)	1987-02-20	Wake Forest
G/F	00	Bennedict Mathurin	6 ft 6 in (1.98 m)	210 lb (95 kg)	2002-06-19	Arizona
G	9	T. J. McConnell	6 ft 1 in (1.85 m)	190 lb (86 kg)	1992-03-25	Arizona
G	2	Andrew Nembhard	6 ft 3 in (1.91 m)	191 lb (87 kg)	2000-01-16	Gonzaga
G/F	23	Aaron Nesmith	6 ft 5 in (1.96 m)	215 lb (98 kg)	1999-10-16	Vanderbilt
F	13	Jordan Nwora	6 ft 9 in (2.06 m)	225 lb (102 kg)	1998-09-09	Louisville
F	25	Jalen Smith	6 ft 10 in (2.08 m)	215 lb (98 kg)	2000-03-16	Maryland
C	27	Daniel Theis	6 ft 9 in (2.06 m)	245 lb (111 kg)	1992-04-04	Germany
C	33	Myles Turner	6 ft 11 in (2.11 m)	250 lb (113 kg)	1996-03-24	Texas
G	32	Gabe York (TW)	6 ft 3 in (1.91 m)	190 lb (86 kg)	1993–08–02	Arizona

Coaches
Head coach
- Rick Carlisle
Assistant(s)
- Maurice Baker
- Jenny Boucek
- Ronald Nored
- Jannero Pargo
- Lloyd Pierce
- Mike Weinar

Legend
- (DP) Unsigned draft pick
- (FA) Free agent
- (S) Suspended
- (GL) On assignment to G League affiliate
- (TW) Two-way affiliate player
- Injured

Roster
Updated: March 30, 2023

== Standings ==
=== Division ===
Central Division	W	L	PCT	GB	Home	Road	Div	GP
z – Milwaukee Bucks	58	24	.707	–	32‍–‍9	26‍–‍15	11–5	82
x – Cleveland Cavaliers	51	31	.622	7.0	31‍–‍10	20‍–‍21	13–3	82
pi – Chicago Bulls	40	42	.488	18.0	22‍–‍19	18‍–‍23	7–9	82
Indiana Pacers	35	47	.427	23.0	20‍–‍21	15‍–‍26	7–9	82
Detroit Pistons	17	65	.207	41.0	9‍–‍32	8‍–‍33	2–14	82

=== Conference ===
Eastern Conference
#	Team	W	L	PCT	GB	GP
1	z – Milwaukee Bucks *	58	24	.707	–	82
2	y – Boston Celtics *	57	25	.695	1.0	82
3	x – Philadelphia 76ers	54	28	.659	4.0	82
4	x – Cleveland Cavaliers	51	31	.622	7.0	82
5	x – New York Knicks	47	35	.573	11.0	82
6	x – Brooklyn Nets	45	37	.549	13.0	82
7	y – Miami Heat *	44	38	.537	14.0	82
8	x – Atlanta Hawks	41	41	.500	17.0	82
9	pi – Toronto Raptors	41	41	.500	17.0	82
10	pi – Chicago Bulls	40	42	.488	18.0	82
11	Indiana Pacers	35	47	.427	23.0	82
12	Washington Wizards	35	47	.427	23.0	82
13	Orlando Magic	34	48	.415	24.0	82
14	Charlotte Hornets	27	55	.329	31.0	82
15	Detroit Pistons	17	65	.207	41.0	82

== Game log ==
=== Preseason ===
2022 preseason game log
Total: 2–2 (Home: 1–1; Road: 1–1)
Preseason: 2–2 (home: 1–1; road: 1–1)

Game	Date	Team	Score	High points	High rebounds	High assists	Location Attendance	Record
1	October 5	@ Charlotte	W 122–97	Aaron Nesmith (16)	Jalen Smith (10)	Haliburton, McConnell (6)	Spectrum Center; 9,382	1–0
2	October 7	@ New York	L 114–131	Tyrese Haliburton (20)	Myles Turner (9)	Tyrese Haliburton (7)	Madison Square Garden; 16,510	1–1
3	October 12	New York	W 109–100	Bennedict Mathurin (27)	Oshae Brissett (8)	Andrew Nembhard (9)	Gainbridge Fieldhouse; 7,081	2–1
4	October 14	Houston	L 114–122	Buddy Hield (19)	Smith, Mathurin (5)	Andrew Nembhard (7)	Gainbridge Fieldhouse; 7,107	2–2

2022–23 preseason schedule

=== Regular season ===
2022–23 game log
Total: 35–47 (Home: 20–21; Road: 15–26)
October: 3–5 (home: 1–2; road: 2–3)

Game	Date	Team	Score	High points	High rebounds	High assists	Location Attendance	Record
1	October 19	Washington	L 107–114	Tyrese Haliburton (26)	Buddy Hield (10)	Tyrese Haliburton (7)	Gainbridge Fieldhouse; 15,027	0–1
2	October 21	San Antonio	L 134–137	Tyrese Haliburton (27)	Terry Taylor (7)	Tyrese Haliburton (12)	Gainbridge Fieldhouse; 12,073	0–2
3	October 22	Detroit	W 124–115	Bennedict Mathurin (27)	Smith, Bitadze (15)	Tyrese Haliburton (10)	Gainbridge Fieldhouse; 16,056	1–2
4	October 24	@ Philadelphia	L 106–120	Tyrese Haliburton (19)	Jalen Smith (10)	Tyrese Haliburton (10)	Wells Fargo Center; 19,786	1–3
5	October 26	@ Chicago	L 109–124	Buddy Hield (25)	Jalen Smith (9)	Tyrese Haliburton (11)	United Center; 18,306	1–4
6	October 28	@ Washington	W 127–117	Myles Turner (27)	Myles Turner (10)	Tyrese Haliburton (12)	Capital One Arena; 13,463	2–4
7	October 29	@ Brooklyn	W 125–116	Bennedict Mathurin (32)	Jalen Smith (14)	Haliburton, Hield (8)	Barclays Center; 17,732	3–4
8	October 31	@ Brooklyn	L 109–116	Chris Duarte (30)	Tyrese Haliburton (8)	Buddy Hield (7)	Barclays Center; 15,770	3–5

November : 9–4 (home: 6–2; road: 3–2)

Game	Date	Team	Score	High points	High rebounds	High assists	Location Attendance	Record
9	November 4	Miami	W 101–99	Buddy Hield (25)	Haliburton, Hield (9)	Tyrese Haliburton (9)	Gainbridge Fieldhouse; 13,141	4–5
10	November 7	New Orleans	W 129–122	Myles Turner (37)	Myles Turner (12)	Tyrese Haliburton (13)	Gainbridge Fieldhouse; 14,052	5–5
11	November 9	Denver	L 119–122	Bennedict Mathurin (30)	Myles Turner (11)	Tyrese Haliburton (12)	Gainbridge Fieldhouse; 14,069	5–6
12	November 12	Toronto	W 118–104	Buddy Hield (22)	Myles Turner (10)	Tyrese Haliburton (15)	Gainbridge Fieldhouse; 13,089	6–6
13	November 16	@ Charlotte	W 125–113	Tyrese Haliburton (22)	Myles Turner (10)	Tyrese Haliburton (11)	Spectrum Center; 14,756	7–6
14	November 18	@ Houston	W 99–91	Tyrese Haliburton (19)	Jalen Smith (18)	Tyrese Haliburton (8)	Toyota Center; 15,882	8–6
15	November 19	Orlando	W 114–113	Tyrese Haliburton (22)	Myles Turner (11)	Tyrese Haliburton (14)	Gainbridge Fieldhouse; 14,478	9–6
16	November 21	Orlando	W 123–102	Bennedict Mathurin (22)	Jackson, Nesmith (8)	Tyrese Haliburton (14)	Gainbridge Fieldhouse; 14,478	10–6
17	November 23	Minnesota	L 101–115	Myles Turner (31)	Myles Turner (7)	Tyrese Haliburton (14)	Gainbridge Fieldhouse; 15,751	10–7
18	November 25	Brooklyn	W 128–117	Buddy Hield (26)	Myles Turner (8)	Tyrese Haliburton (15)	Gainbridge Fieldhouse; 15,404	11–7
19	November 27	@ L.A. Clippers	L 100–114	Jalen Smith (23)	Jalen Smith (9)	Tyrese Haliburton (11)	Crypto.com Arena; 16,805	11–8
20	November 28	@ L.A. Lakers	W 116–115	Tyrese Haliburton (24)	Myles Turner (13)	Tyrese Haliburton (14)	Crypto.com Arena; 16,034	12–8
21	November 30	@ Sacramento	L 114–137	Mathurin, Smith (22)	Jackson, Smith, Turner (6)	Haliburton, McConnell (10)	Golden 1 Center; 17,611	12–9

December: 8–8 (home: 5–3; road: 3–5)

Game	Date	Team	Score	High points	High rebounds	High assists	Location Attendance	Record
22	December 2	@ Utah	L 119–139	Myles Turner (18)	Tyrese Haliburton (6)	Andrew Nembhard (10)	Vivint Arena; 18,206	12–10
23	December 4	@ Portland	L 100–116	Myles Turner (24)	Buddy Hield (11)	Andrew Nembhard (8)	Moda Center; 17,579	12–11
24	December 5	@ Golden State	W 112–104	Andrew Nembhard (31)	Hield, Smith (9)	Andrew Nembhard (13)	Chase Center; 18,064	13–11
25	December 7	@ Minnesota	L 115–121	Haliburton, Hield (28)	Myles Turner (7)	Tyrese Haliburton (15)	Target Center; 15,472	13–12
26	December 9	Washington	W 121–111	Buddy Hield (28)	Brissett, Mathurin (8)	Tyrese Haliburton (11)	Gainbridge Fieldhouse; 15,039	14–12
27	December 10	Brooklyn	L 133–136	Tyrese Haliburton (35)	Bennedict Mathurin (7)	Tyrese Haliburton (9)	Gainbridge Fieldhouse; 14,280	14–13
28	December 12	Miami	L 82–87	Buddy Hield (19)	Myles Turner (13)	Tyrese Haliburton (6)	Gainbridge Fieldhouse; 15,309	14–14
29	December 14	Golden State	W 125–119	Tyrese Haliburton (29)	Mathurin, Smith (6)	T. J. McConnell (9)	Gainbridge Fieldhouse; 15,069	15–14
30	December 16	@ Cleveland	L 112–118	Bennedict Mathurin (22)	Myles Turner (11)	Tyrese Haliburton (14)	Rocket Mortgage FieldHouse; 19,432	15–15
31	December 18	New York	L 106–109	Hield, Nesmith (23)	Aaron Nesmith (10)	Tyrese Haliburton (10)	Gainbridge Fieldhouse; 14,513	15–16
32	December 21	@ Boston	W 117–112	Tyrese Haliburton (33)	Jalen Smith (9)	Tyrese Haliburton (8)	TD Garden; 19,156	16–16
33	December 23	@ Miami	W 111–108	Tyrese Haliburton (43)	Smith, Turner (11)	Tyrese Haliburton (7)	FTX Arena; 19,600	17–16
34	December 26	@ New Orleans	L 93–113	Bennedict Mathurin (15)	Myles Turner (8)	Haliburton, McConnell (6)	Smoothie King Center; 18,636	17–17
35	December 27	Atlanta	W 129–114	Buddy Hield (28)	Buddy Hield (9)	Tyrese Haliburton (7)	Gainbridge Fieldhouse; 17,028	18–17
36	December 29	Cleveland	W 135–126	Tyrese Haliburton (29)	Myles Turner (12)	Tyrese Haliburton (9)	Gainbridge Fieldhouse; 17,274	19–17
37	December 31	L.A. Clippers	W 131–130	Myles Turner (34)	Buddy Hield (8)	Tyrese Haliburton (10)	Gainbridge Fieldhouse; 16,731	20–17

January : 4–11 (home: 4–3; road: 0–8)

Game	Date	Team	Score	High points	High rebounds	High assists	Location Attendance	Record
38	January 2	Toronto	W 122–114	Bennedict Mathurin (21)	Jalen Smith (11)	Tyrese Haliburton (8)	Gainbridge Fieldhouse; 14,054	21–17
39	January 4	@ Philadelphia	L 126–129 (OT)	Buddy Hield (24)	Buddy Hield (9)	Tyrese Haliburton (12)	Wells Fargo Center; 20,033	21–18
40	January 6	Portland	W 108–99	Bennedict Mathurin (19)	Nesmith, Turner (7)	Tyrese Haliburton (12)	Gainbridge Fieldhouse; 16,548	22–18
41	January 8	Charlotte	W 116–111	Myles Turner (29)	Oshae Brissett (10)	Tyrese Haliburton (13)	Gainbridge Fieldhouse; 15,805	23–18
42	January 11	@ New York	L 113–119	Buddy Hield (31)	Hield, McConnell (8)	Haliburton, McConnell (7)	Madison Square Garden; 18,249	23–19
43	January 13	Atlanta	L 111–113	Bennedict Mathurin (26)	Brissett, Jackson (10)	T. J. McConnell (7)	Gainbridge Fieldhouse; 16,071	23–20
44	January 14	Memphis	L 112–130	Chris Duarte (25)	T. J. McConnell (8)	T. J. McConnell (11)	Gainbridge Fieldhouse; 17,274	23–21
45	January 16	@ Milwaukee	L 119–132	Myles Turner (30)	Mathurin, Turner (8)	McConnell, Nembhard (9)	Fiserv Forum; 17,412	23–22
46	January 18	@ Oklahoma City	L 106–126	Andrew Nembhard (18)	Trevelin Queen (9)	Andrew Nembhard (7)	Paycom Center; 14,478	23–23
47	January 20	@ Denver	L 111–134	Bennedict Mathurin (19)	Myles Turner (7)	McConnell, Nembhard (6)	Ball Arena; 19,609	23–24
48	January 21	@ Phoenix	L 107–112	Bennedict Mathurin (23)	Myles Turner (12)	T. J. McConnell (12)	Footprint Center; 17,071	23–25
49	January 24	Chicago	W 116–110	Mathurin, Turner (26)	Chris Duarte (9)	T. J. McConnell (10)	Gainbridge Fieldhouse; 16,102	24–25
50	January 25	@ Orlando	L 120–126	Bennedict Mathurin (26)	Myles Turner (13)	T. J. McConnell (8)	Amway Center; 18,846	24–26
51	January 27	Milwaukee	L 131–141	Myles Turner (24)	Bennedict Mathurin (8)	T. J. McConnell (9)	Gainbridge Fieldhouse; 16,090	24–27
52	January 29	@ Memphis	L 100–112	Bennedict Mathurin (27)	Bennedict Mathurin (8)	T. J. McConnell (7)	FedExForum; 17,794	24–28

February : 4–7 (home: 2–5; road: 2–2)

Game	Date	Team	Score	High points	High rebounds	High assists	Location Attendance	Record
53	February 2	L.A. Lakers	L 111–112	Tyrese Haliburton (26)	Myles Turner (13)	Tyrese Haliburton (12)	Gainbridge Fieldhouse; 17,274	24–29
54	February 3	Sacramento	W 107–104	Buddy Hield (21)	Myles Turner (13)	Tyrese Haliburton (9)	Gainbridge Fieldhouse; 17,274	25–29
55	February 5	Cleveland	L 103–122	Myles Turner (27)	Myles Turner (10)	Tyrese Haliburton (11)	Gainbridge Fieldhouse; 17,274	25–30
56	February 8	@ Miami	L 111–116	Buddy Hield (29)	Myles Turner (10)	Tyrese Haliburton (10)	Miami-Dade Arena; 19,600	25–31
57	February 10	Phoenix	L 104–117	Bennedict Mathurin (22)	Chris Duarte (6)	Andrew Nembhard (10)	Gainbridge Fieldhouse; 16,522	25–32
58	February 11	@ Washington	L 113–127	Tyrese Haliburton (21)	Tyrese Haliburton (6)	Tyrese Haliburton (7)	Capital One Arena; 18,387	25–33
59	February 13	Utah	L 117–123	Tyrese Haliburton (30)	Aaron Nesmith (6)	Tyrese Haliburton (12)	Gainbridge Fieldhouse; 15,004	25–34
60	February 15	Chicago	W 117–113	Buddy Hield (27)	Myles Turner (9)	Tyrese Haliburton (8)	Gainbridge Fieldhouse; 15,599	26–34
61	February 23	Boston	L 138–142 (OT)	Myles Turner (40)	Myles Turner (10)	Tyrese Haliburton (14)	Gainbridge Fieldhouse; 16,125	26–35
62	February 25	@ Orlando	W 121–108	Myles Turner (24)	Nwora, Turner (8)	Tyrese Haliburton (14)	Amway Center; 19,231	27–35
63	February 28	@ Dallas	W 124–122	Tyrese Haliburton (32)	Jalen Smith (9)	Tyrese Haliburton (6)	American Airlines Center; 20,277	28–35

March : 6–9 (home: 2–4; road: 4–5)

Game	Date	Team	Score	High points	High rebounds	High assists	Location Attendance	Record
64	March 2	@ San Antonio	L 99–110	Buddy Hield (27)	Chris Duarte (9)	T. J. McConnell (5)	AT&T Center; 14,617	28–36
65	March 5	@ Chicago	W 125–122	Tyrese Haliburton (29)	Isaiah Jackson (7)	Tyrese Haliburton (11)	United Center; 21,225	29–36
66	March 6	Philadelphia	L 143–147	Tyrese Haliburton (40)	Buddy Hield (8)	Tyrese Haliburton (16)	Gainbridge Fieldhouse; 15,008	29–37
67	March 9	Houston	W 134–125 (OT)	Tyrese Haliburton (29)	Aaron Nesmith (7)	Tyrese Haliburton (19)	Gainbridge Fieldhouse; 16,027	30–37
68	March 11	@ Detroit	W 121–115	Jalen Smith (20)	Isaiah Jackson (11)	Andrew Nembhard (8)	Little Caesars Arena; 20,190	31–37
69	March 13	@ Detroit	L 97–117	Jordan Nwora (20)	Hield, Smith (8)	Andrew Nembhard (7)	Little Caesars Arena; 18,313	31–38
70	March 16	@ Milwaukee	W 139–123	Andrew Nembhard (24)	Nwora, Smith, Turner (8)	T. J. McConnell (12)	Fiserv Forum; 17,797	32–38
71	March 18	Philadelphia	L 121–141	Aaron Nesmith (25)	Jordan Nwora (9)	T. J. McConnell (9)	Gainbridge Fieldhouse; 17,274	32–39
72	March 20	@ Charlotte	L 109–115	Hield, Turner (20)	Isaiah Jackson (10)	T. J. McConnell (8)	Spectrum Center; 12,449	32–40
73	March 22	@ Toronto	W 118–114	Andrew Nembhard (25)	Myles Turner (7)	Andrew Nembhard (10)	Scotiabank Arena; 19,800	33–40
74	March 24	@ Boston	L 95–120	Haliburton, Turner (20)	Buddy Hield (8)	Tyrese Haliburton (9)	TD Garden; 19,699	33–41
75	March 25	@ Atlanta	L 130–143	Jordan Nwora (33)	Jalen Smith (7)	Tyrese Haliburton (13)	State Farm Arena; 17,699	33–42
76	March 27	Dallas	L 104–127	Bennedict Mathurin (26)	Isaiah Jackson (12)	T. J. McConnell (7)	Gainbridge Fieldhouse; 17,022	33–43
77	March 29	Milwaukee	L 136–149	Bennedict Mathurin (29)	Bennedict Mathurin (9)	Andrew Nembhard (15)	Gainbridge Fieldhouse; 16,524	33–44
78	March 31	Oklahoma City	W 121–117	T. J. McConnell (21)	Jalen Smith (15)	T. J. McConnell (8)	Gainbridge Fieldhouse; 16,506	34–44

April: 1–3 (home: 0–2; road: 1–1)

Game	Date	Team	Score	High points	High rebounds	High assists	Location Attendance	Record
79	April 2	@ Cleveland	L 105–115	Bennedict Mathurin (19)	Jordan Nwora (10)	Andrew Nembhard (8)	Rocket Mortgage FieldHouse; 19,432	34–45
80	April 5	New York	L 129–138	Jalen Smith (19)	Jackson, Mathurin (8)	T. J. McConnell (12)	Gainbridge Fieldhouse; 16,789	34–46
81	April 7	Detroit	L 115–122	Buddy Hield (22)	Isaiah Jackson (7)	Andrew Nembhard (10)	Gainbridge Fieldhouse; 17,274	34–47
82	April 9	@ New York	W 141–136	Bennedict Mathurin (26)	Brissett, Jackson (9)	Andrew Nembhard (9)	Madison Square Garden; 19,812	35–47

2022–23 season schedule

== Player statistics ==
=== Regular season ===
Player	POS	GP	GS	MP	REB	AST	STL	BLK	PTS	MPG	RPG	APG	SPG	BPG	PPG
Buddy Hield	SF	80	73	2,482	400	225	92	26	1,344	31.0	5.0	2.8	1.2	.3	16.8
Bennedict Mathurin	SG	78	17	2,222	318	116	48	13	1,302	28.5	4.1	1.5	.6	.2	16.7
Andrew Nembhard	SG	75	63	2,073	199	341	70	13	709	27.6	2.7	4.5	.9	.2	9.5
T. J. McConnell	PG	75	6	1,526	234	397	81	10	650	20.3	3.1	5.3	1.1	.1	8.7
Aaron Nesmith	SF	73	60	1,816	277	98	55	34	738	24.9	3.8	1.3	.8	.5	10.1
Jalen Smith	C	68	31	1,279	394	66	21	60	642	18.8	5.8	1.0	.3	.9	9.4
Oshae Brissett	PF	65	2	1,083	218	44	33	13	398	16.7	3.4	.7	.5	.2	6.1
Isaiah Jackson	C	63	12	1,042	282	51	31	93	455	16.5	4.5	.8	.5	1.5	7.2
Myles Turner	C	62	62	1,825	466	89	36	140	1,113	29.4	7.5	1.4	.6	2.3	18.0
Tyrese Haliburton	PG	56	56	1,883	205	585	91	25	1,160	33.6	3.7	10.4	1.6	.4	20.7
Chris Duarte	SF	46	12	897	115	64	25	9	362	19.5	2.5	1.4	.5	.2	7.9
Terry Taylor^{†}	PF	26	2	228	39	10	3	5	69	8.8	1.5	.4	.1	.2	2.7
Jordan Nwora^{†}	SF	24	11	591	112	50	12	7	313	24.6	4.7	2.1	.5	.3	13.0
Goga Bitadze^{†}	C	21	0	202	49	18	9	10	69	9.6	2.3	.9	.4	.5	3.3
James Johnson	PF	18	1	162	30	15	7	6	51	9.0	1.7	.8	.4	.3	2.8
George Hill^{†}	SG	11	1	166	18	21	7	3	57	15.1	1.6	1.9	.6	.3	5.2
Daniel Theis	C	7	1	109	22	9	2	6	49	15.6	3.1	1.3	.3	.9	7.0
Trevelin Queen	SG	7	0	70	17	6	2	5	21	10.0	2.4	.9	.3	.7	3.0
Kendall Brown	SG	6	0	40	6	3	4	0	9	6.7	1.0	.5	.7	.0	1.5
Gabe York	SG	3	0	56	6	5	2	0	24	18.7	2.0	1.7	.7	.0	8.0

- ^{†} Denotes player spent time with another team in the season. Stats reflect time with the Pacers only.

== Transactions ==
=== Trades ===
June 23, 2022	To Indiana Pacers Draft rights to Kendall Brown (No. 48)	To Minnesota Timberwolves 2026 second-round pick
June 24, 2022	To Indiana Pacers Cash considerations	To Milwaukee Bucks Draft rights to Hugo Besson (No. 58)
July 9, 2022	To Indiana Pacers Malik Fitts; Juwan Morgan; Aaron Nesmith; Nik Stauskas; Daniel Theis; 2023 BOS protected first-round pick (Julian Strawther)	To Boston Celtics Malcolm Brogdon
February 9, 2023 (Four-team trade)	To Indiana Pacers George Hill (from Milwaukee); Jordan Nwora (from Milwaukee); Serge Ibaka (from Milwaukee); 2023 CLE second-round pick (from Milwaukee) (Isaiah Wong); 2024 MIL second-round pick (from Milwaukee) (Quinten Post); 2025 IND second-round pick (from Brooklyn); Cash considerations (from Brooklyn)	To Milwaukee Bucks Jae Crowder (from Phoenix)
February 9, 2023 (Four-team trade)	To Brooklyn Nets Mikal Bridges (from Phoenix); Cameron Johnson (from Phoenix); Draft rights to Juan Pablo Vaulet (2015 No. 39) (from Indiana); 2023 PHX first-round pick (from Phoenix) (Noah Clowney); 2025 PHX first-round pick (from Phoenix); 2027 PHX first-round pick (from Phoenix); 2028 right to swap first-round picks (from Phoenix); 2028 MIL second-round pick (from Milwaukee); 2029 PHX first-round pick (from Phoenix); 2029 second-round pick (from Milwaukee)	To Phoenix Suns Kevin Durant (from Brooklyn); T. J. Warren (from Brooklyn)

=== Free agency ===
==== Re-signed ====
Player	Signed	Ref.
Jalen Smith	July 6, 2022	

==== Additions ====
Player	Signed	Former team	Ref.
Langston Galloway	September 23, 2022	Milwaukee Bucks	

==== Subtractions ====
Player	Reason	New Team	Ref.
Oshae Brissett	Free agency	Boston Celtics	
Goga Bitadze	Waived	Orlando Magic	
Langston Galloway	Waived	College Park Skyhawks	
