= Jarace Walker =

American basketball player (born 2003)

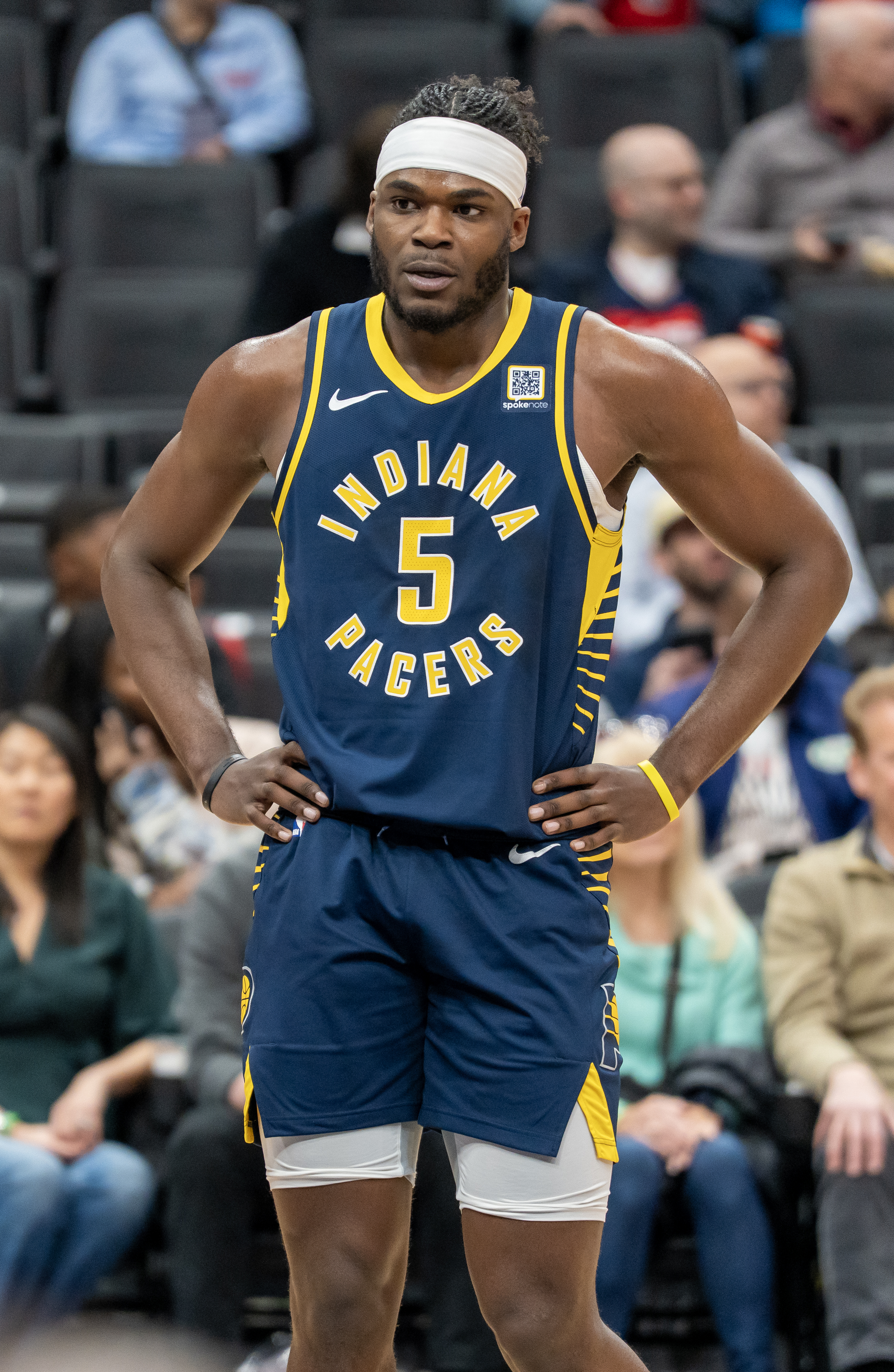
- Walker with the Indiana Pacers in 2025

No. 5 – Indiana Pacers
- Position: Power forward / small forward
- League: NBA

Personal information
- Born: September 4, 2003 (age 23) Baltimore, Maryland, U.S.
- Listed height: 6 ft 7 in (2.01 m)
- Listed weight: 235 lb (107 kg)

Career information
- High school: Susquehannock (Glen Rock, Pennsylvania); IMG Academy (Bradenton, Florida)
- College: Houston (2022–2023)
- NBA draft: 2023: 1st round, 8th overall pick
- Drafted by: Washington Wizards
- Playing career: 2023–present

Career history
- 2023–present: Indiana Pacers
- 2023–2025: →Indiana Mad Ants

Career highlights
- AAC Rookie of the Year (2023); Second-team All-AAC (2023); AAC All-Freshman Team (2023); McDonald's All-American (2022); Nike Hoop Summit (2022)
- Stats at NBA.com
- Stats at Basketball Reference

Jarace Isaiah Walker (/ˈdʒɛərəs/ JAIR-əss; born September 4, 2003) is an American professional basketball player for the Indiana Pacers of the National Basketball Association (NBA). Walker was a consensus five-star recruit and one of the top players in the 2022 class. He played college basketball for the Houston Cougars and was selected eighth overall by the Washington Wizards in the 2023 NBA draft before being traded to the Pacers later that offseason.

== High school career ==
Walker attended Susquehannock High School in York County, Pennsylvania for his freshman year before transferring to IMG Academy in Bradenton, Florida. As a senior, he averaged 16.7 points, 8.2 rebounds and four assists per game. He was selected to play in the 2022 McDonalds All-American Game.

=== Recruiting ===
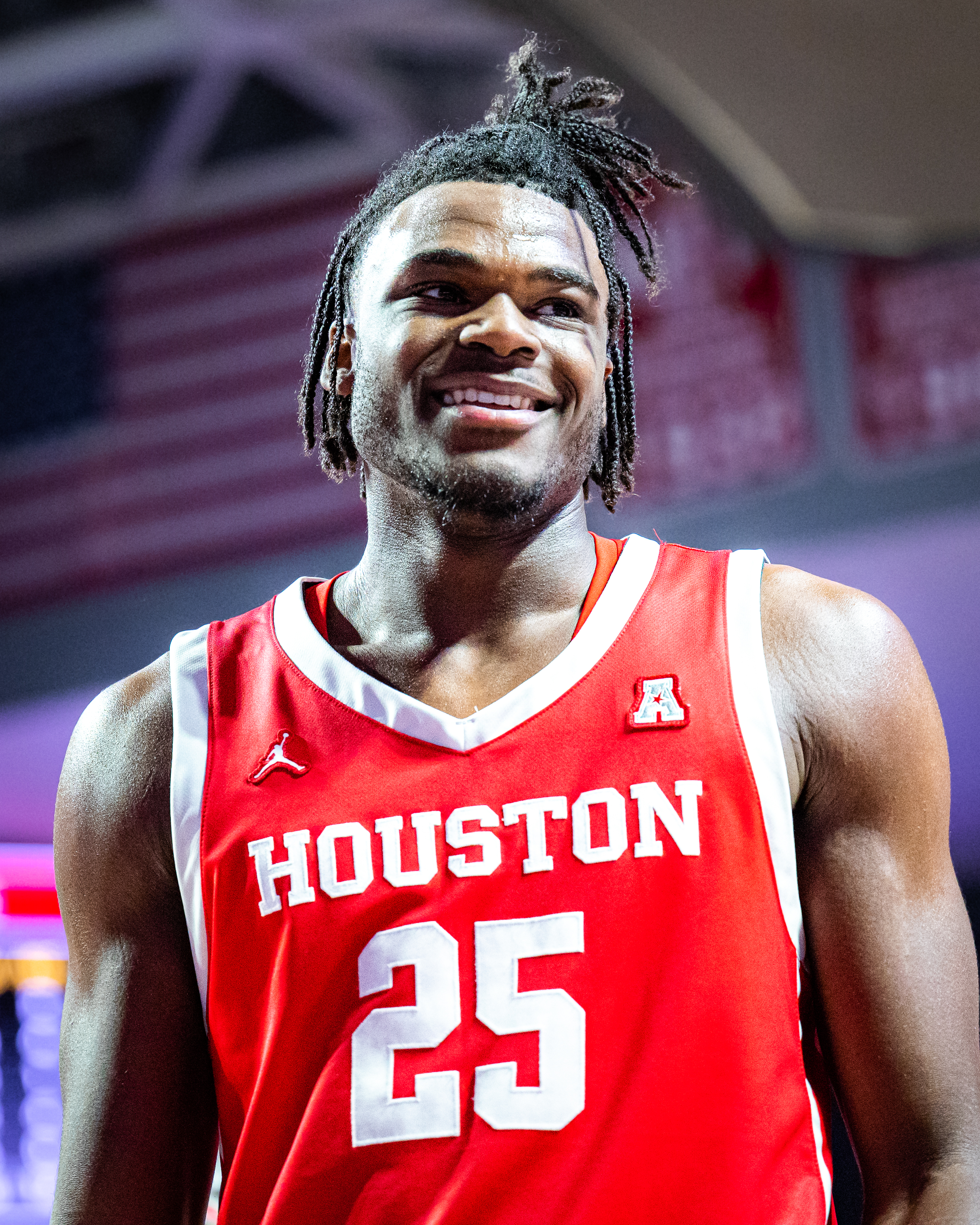

Walker was a consensus five-star recruit and one of the top players in the 2022 class, according to major recruiting services. On November 4, 2021, he committed to playing college basketball for Houston over offers from Alabama and Auburn.

College recruiting
| Name | Hometown | School | Height | Weight | Commit date |
|---|---|---|---|---|---|
| Jarace Walker; PF | New Freedom, PA | IMG Academy (FL) | 6 ft 8 in (2.03 m) | 220 lb (100 kg) | Nov 4, 2021 |
| Jarace Walker; PF | Recruit ratings: Rivals: 247Sports: ESPN: (92) | | | | |
Overall recruit ranking: Rivals: 12 247Sports: 12 ESPN: 10
Note: In many cases, Scout, Rivals, 247Sports, On3, and ESPN may conflict in their listings of height and weight.; In these cases, the average was taken. ESPN grades are on a 100-point scale.; Sources: "Houston 2022 Basketball Commitments". Rivals.; "2022 Houston Cougars Recruiting Class". ESPN.; "2022 Team Ranking". Rivals.

== Professional career ==
The Washington Wizards selected Walker with the eighth overall pick in the 2023 NBA draft and traded him to the Indiana Pacers along with two future second-round picks for the draft rights to Bilal Coulibaly, the seventh overall pick. Walker became the highest-drafted prospect from the University of Houston since Hall-of-Famer Hakeem Olajuwon was taken with the first overall pick by the Houston Rockets in 1984. On July 1, 2023, Walker signed his rookie contract with the Pacers alongside the 26th overall pick Ben Sheppard. Walker's playing time was limited his rookie season, playing behind Pascal Siakam and Obi Toppin as the team reached the 2024 Eastern Conference Finals.

On May 31, 2025, during game 6 of the Eastern Conference Finals against the New York Knicks, Walker suffered an ankle injury in the 125-108 victory which closed out the series. Walker was on crutches after the game and Pacers coach Rick Carlisle said that Walker's availability for the 2025 NBA Finals against the Oklahoma City Thunder was uncertain. Walker was ultimately ruled out for the entirety of the NBA Finals as the Pacers lost the series in the deciding Game 7.

Prior to the start of the 2025-26 NBA season, Walker recovered from his ankle injury.

== Personal life ==
Walker is the son of Marcia and Horace Walker. He has three older sisters: Jaden, Natichia and Sherelle. Sherelle played volleyball at UMBC and sister Jaden played basketball at Saint Joseph's.

== Career statistics ==
Legend
| GP | Games played | GS | Games started | MPG | Minutes per game |
| FG% | Field goal percentage | 3P% | 3-point field goal percentage | FT% | Free throw percentage |
| RPG | Rebounds per game | APG | Assists per game | SPG | Steals per game |
| BPG | Blocks per game | PPG | Points per game | **Bold** | Career high |

=== NBA ===
==== Regular season ====
| Year | Team | GP | GS | MPG | FG% | 3P% | FT% | RPG | APG | SPG | BPG | PPG |
|---|---|---|---|---|---|---|---|---|---|---|---|---|
| 2023–24 | Indiana | 33 | 0 | 10.3 | .409 | .400 | **.889** | 1.9 | 1.2 | .5 | **.3** | 3.6 |
| 2024–25 | Indiana | 75 | 5 | 15.8 | **.472** | **.405** | .667 | 3.1 | 1.5 | .7 | **.3** | 6.1 |
| 2025–26 | Indiana | **76** | **41** | 25.7 | .419 | .374 | .749 | **5.1** | **2.5** | **.8** | **.3** | **11.6** |
| Career | | 184 | 46 | 18.9 | .434 | .386 | .732 | 3.7 | 1.9 | .7 | .3 | 8.0 |

==== Playoffs ====
| Year | Team | GP | GS | MPG | FG% | 3P% | FT% | RPG | APG | SPG | BPG | PPG |
|---|---|---|---|---|---|---|---|---|---|---|---|---|
| 2024 | Indiana | 9 | 0 | 3.4 | .300 | .000 | **.667** | .4 | .4 | **.2** | .1 | .9 |
| 2025 | Indiana | **12** | 0 | **9.8** | **.382** | **.400** | .500 | **1.8** | **.7** | **.2** | **.2** | **3.0** |
| Career | | 21 | 0 | 7.0 | .364 | .348 | .571 | 1.2 | .6 | .2 | .1 | 2.1 |

=== College ===
| Year | Team | GP | GS | MPG | FG% | 3P% | FT% | RPG | APG | SPG | BPG | PPG |
|---|---|---|---|---|---|---|---|---|---|---|---|---|
| 2022–23 | Houston | 36 | 35 | 27.6 | .465 | .347 | .663 | 6.8 | 1.8 | 1.0 | 1.3 | 11.2 |
