= T. J. McConnell =

American basketball player (born 1992)

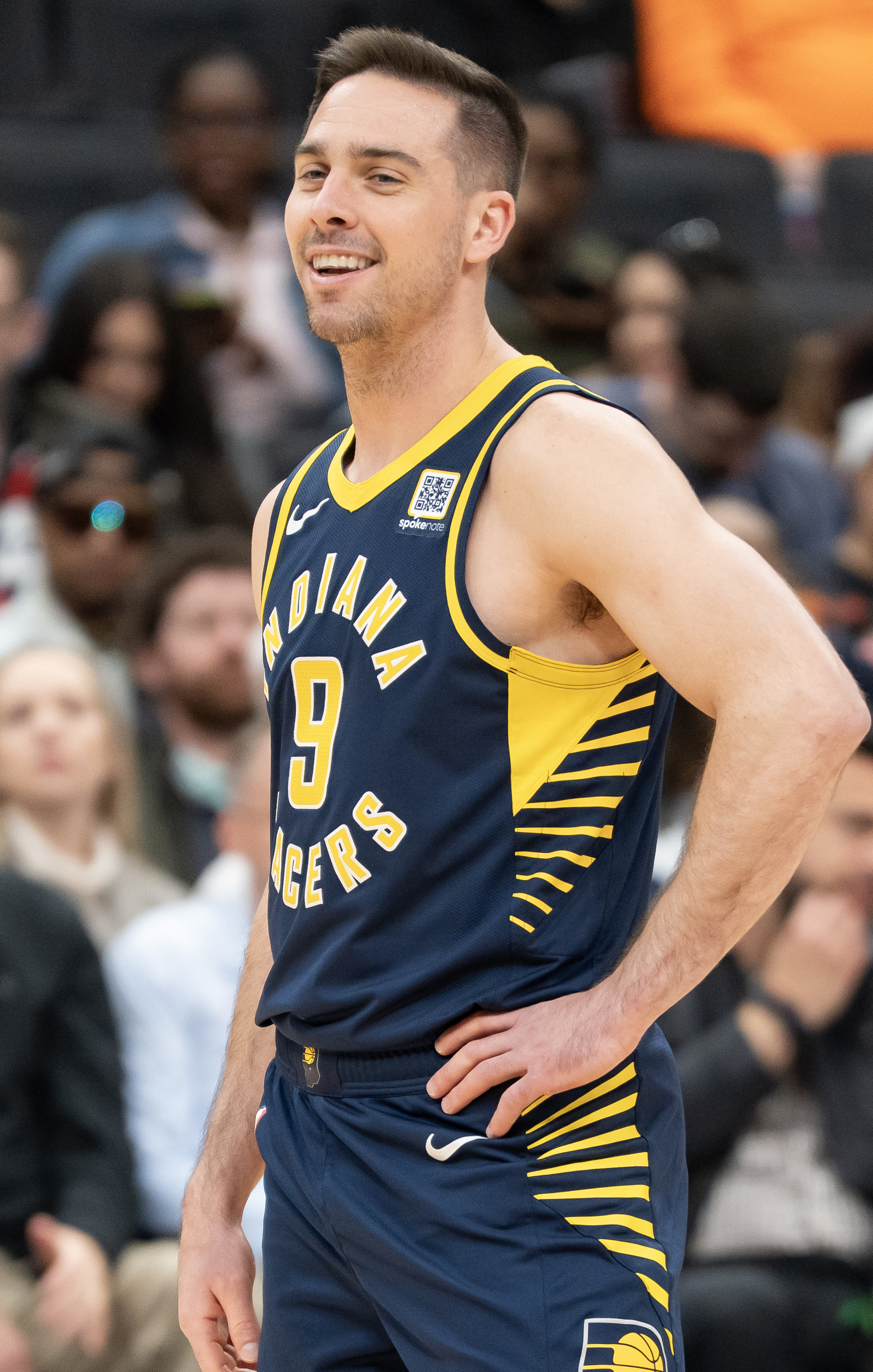
- McConnell with the Indiana Pacers in 2025

No. 9 – Indiana Pacers
- Position: Point guard
- League: NBA

Personal information
- Born: March 25, 1992 (age 34) Pittsburgh, Pennsylvania, U.S.
- Listed height: 6 ft 1 in (1.85 m)
- Listed weight: 190 lb (86 kg)

Career information
- High school: Chartiers Valley (Bridgeville, Pennsylvania)
- College: Duquesne (2010–2012); Arizona (2013–2015)
- NBA draft: 2015: undrafted
- Playing career: 2015–present

Career history
- 2015–2019: Philadelphia 76ers
- 2019–present: Indiana Pacers

Career highlights
- AP honorable mention All-American (2015); First-team All-Pac-12 (2015); Second-team All-Pac-12 (2014); 2× Pac-12 All-Defensive Team (2014, 2015); Third-team All-Atlantic 10 (2012); Atlantic 10 All-Defensive Team (2012); Atlantic 10 Rookie of the Year (2011); Atlantic 10 All-Rookie Team (2011)
- Stats at NBA.com
- Stats at Basketball Reference

Timothy John McConnell Jr. (born March 25, 1992) is an American professional basketball player for the Indiana Pacers of the National Basketball Association (NBA). He played college basketball for the Duquesne Dukes and the Arizona Wildcats. After going undrafted, McConnell joined the Philadelphia 76ers in 2015 and spent four seasons with the team before signing with the Pacers in 2019.

== High school career ==
McConnell attended Chartiers Valley High School in the Pittsburgh-area borough of Bridgeville, Pennsylvania, where he played for his father, Tim. As team captain his senior year, he averaged 34.2 points, 8.2 rebounds and 9.1 assists per game, earned first-team all-state honors, and was named the Associated Press's Pennsylvania Class 3A Player of the Year male athlete of the year for all sports by the Pittsburgh Post-Gazette. He led the Colts to a 29–2 record, the WPIAL championship, and a berth in the Class 3A state championship game as a senior, which they lost to Philadelphia's Neumann-Goretti.

== College career ==
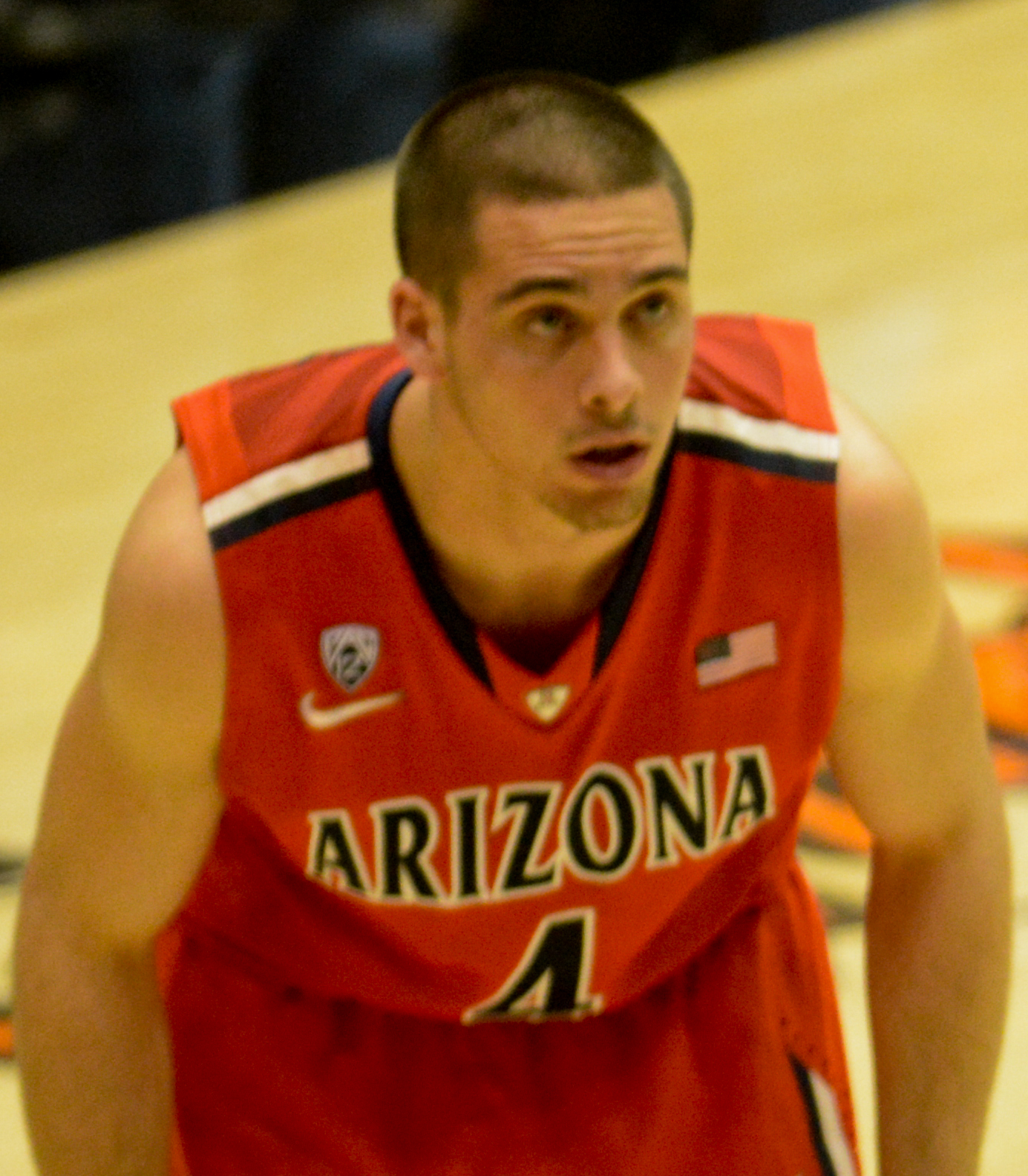
T.J. McConnell for Arizona in 2014

As a freshman for Duquesne in 2010–11, McConnell averaged 10.8 points, 3.8 rebounds, 4.4 assists, and 2.8 steals per game in 32 appearances (30 starts), earning 2011 Atlantic 10 Freshman of the Year honors.

As a sophomore in 2011–12, he averaged 11.4 points, 4.4 rebounds, 5.5 assists, and 2.8 steals per game, helping the Dukes to a 16–15 record and earning third-team All-Atlantic 10 Conference honors and a spot on the A-10 All-Defensive Team.

In April 2012, he transferred to Arizona where he was subsequently forced to sit out the 2012–13 season due to NCAA transfer rules. McConnell's transfer was motivated by a desire to compete for a national championship.

In the 2013–14 season, McConnell helped lead the Wildcats to a 21–0 record to start the season before teammate Brandon Ashley injured his foot and was sidelined for the rest of the season. The season culminated in an Elite 8 appearance for the Wildcats. As a senior, McConnell was voted first-team All-Pac-12 and named to the Pac-12 All-Defensive Team, and he helped lead Arizona to another appearance in the Elite Eight, where they lost to the Wisconsin Badgers for a second consecutive season. On December 18, 2024 McConnell became the 34th Arizona Wildcat to have his name inducted into the Arizona Basketball Ring of Honor, doing so by playing 10 years in the NBA.

== Professional career ==
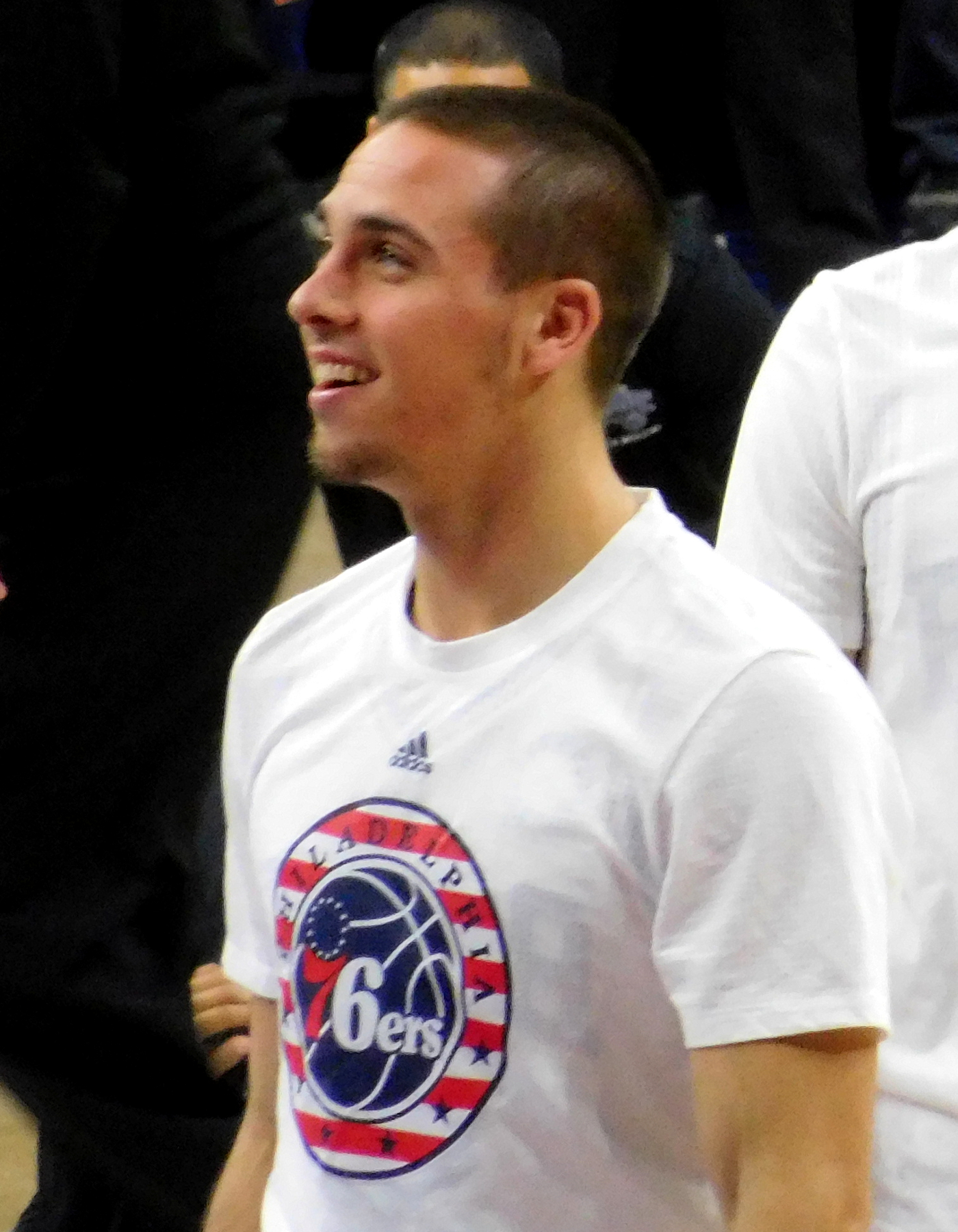
McConnell during pregame warmups

=== Philadelphia 76ers (2015–2019) ===
After going undrafted in the 2015 NBA draft, McConnell joined his home state team the Philadelphia 76ers for the 2015 NBA Summer League. On September 27, 2015, he signed with the 76ers. He played well during preseason, averaging 6.2 points and 4.8 assists in five games, earning himself a spot on the 76ers' opening night roster. McConnell went on to make his NBA debut in the team's season opener against the Boston Celtics on October 28. In 27 minutes of action, he recorded four points, four assists, and three steals in a 112–95 loss. On February 6, 2016, while starting at point guard in place of the injured Ish Smith, McConnell tied his season-high of 17 points in a 103–98 win over the Brooklyn Nets. On March 23, in a loss to the Denver Nuggets, he had a 17-point outing for a third time in 2015–16. At the season's end, he received two votes in the 2016 NBA All-Rookie Team voting.

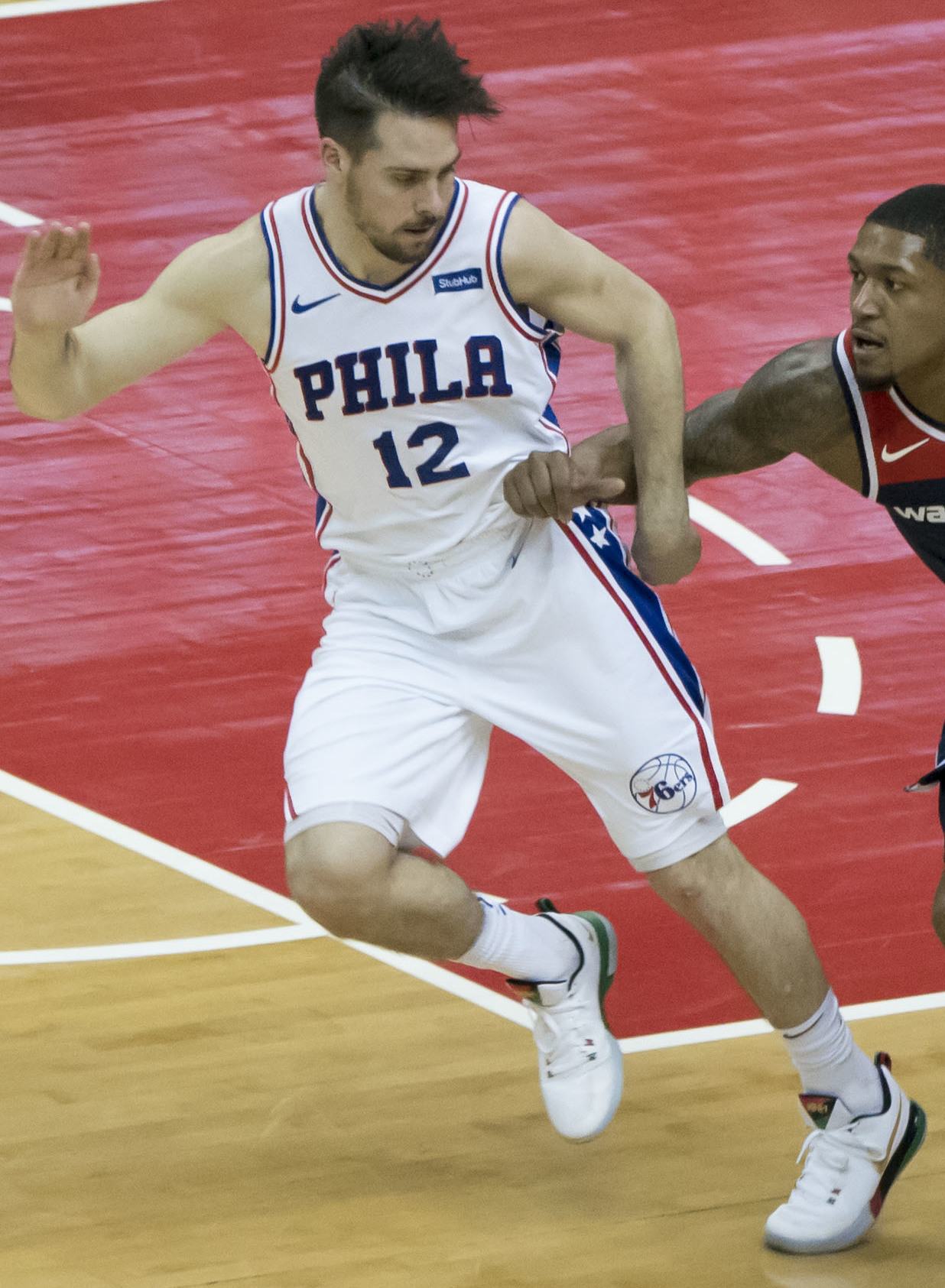
McConnell defending against Washington Wizards' Bradley Beal in February 2018

In July 2016, McConnell rejoined the 76ers for the 2016 NBA Summer League. On December 11, 2016, he had a near triple-double with 12 points, 10 rebounds and nine assists in a 97–79 win over the Detroit Pistons. On January 6, 2017, he had a career-high 17 assists in a 110–106 loss to the Boston Celtics, becoming just the fourth player in franchise history to hit that mark in a single contest. His total was two off the Philadelphia's all-time record of 19 assists, initially set by Maurice Cheeks in 1987, and later matched by Dana Barros in 1995. McConnell hit a game-winning buzzer beater against the New York Knicks with a turnaround jump shot on the baseline on January 11.

On November 25, 2017, McConnell had 15 points and 13 assists in a 130–111 win over the Orlando Magic. On January 15, 2018, he scored a career-high 18 points in a 117–111 win over the Toronto Raptors. On February 12, McConnell recorded his first career triple-double with 10 points, 10 rebounds and 11 assists in a 108–92 win over the New York Knicks. He also matched a career high with six steals and became the first player in franchise history to record a triple-double off the bench. In Game 4 of the 76ers' second-round playoff series against the Boston Celtics, McConnell had a career-high 19 points, seven rebounds, and five assists in a 103–92 win, helping Philadelphia cut the series deficit to 3–1. On June 13, the 76ers announced they had exercised the fourth-year option on their contract with McConnell.

McConnell made 76 appearances (including three starts) in his final season for the 76ers, recording averages of 6.4 points, 2.3 rebounds, and 3.4 assists.

=== Indiana Pacers (2019–present) ===
On July 3, 2019, McConnell signed a two-year contract worth $7 million with the Indiana Pacers. He compiled 71 appearances (including three starts) for the Pacers during the 2019–20 NBA season, recording averages of 6.5 points, 2.7 rebounds, and 5.0 assists.

On March 3, 2021, McConnell broke the NBA record for most steals in a half with 9. He also became the first player since Mookie Blaylock in 1998 to record a triple-double with points, steals, and assists, as well as the first one to do so off the bench. In 69 contests (three starts) for Indiana, McConnell averaged 8.6 points, and posted career-highs in rebounds (3.7), assists (6.6), and steals (1.9).

On August 2, 2021, the Pacers re-signed McConnell to a four-year, $35 million contract. On December 1, he suffered a right wrist injury in a 111–114 loss to the Atlanta Hawks. On December 7, McConnell underwent surgery and was ruled out for at least 10-to-12 weeks. Due to his injury, he only appeared in 27 games (starting eight), in which he averaged 8.5 points, 3.3 rebounds, and 4.9 assists.

On January 16, 2023, McConnell recorded a career-high 29 points, scoring 25 points in the first half, in a loss to the Milwaukee Bucks. On January 21, as a starter, McConnell recorded his third career triple-double with 18 points, 12 assists, and 10 rebounds. He appeared in 75 games (starting six) for Indiana in the 2022–23 season, averaging 8.7 points, 3.1 rebounds, and 5.3 assists.

On May 2, 2024, McConnell recorded a playoff career-high 20 points and nine rebounds in a 120–98 series-clinching victory against the Milwaukee Bucks in Game 6 of the First Round. He made 71 appearances (including four starts) for Indiana during the 2023–24 NBA season, averaging a career-high 10.2 points, 2.7 rebounds, and 5.5 assists.

On August 30, 2024, McConnell signed a four-year, $45 million contract extension with the Pacers. On December 8, McConnell scored a career-high 30 points, going 14-for-19 with one rebound, six assists, two blocks, and two steals in a 113–109 loss to the Charlotte Hornets. He played in 79 games (including one start) for Indiana during the regular season, posting averages of 9.1 points, 2.4 rebounds, and 4.4 assists. On June 11, 2025, McConnell recorded 10 points, five assists, and five steals in Game 3 of the NBA Finals against the Oklahoma City Thunder. He became the first player to record 10+ points, 5+ assists, and 5+ steals off the bench in an NBA Finals game.

On January 16, 2026, McConnell joined Lou Williams as the only players in NBA history to record 3,000 assists off of the bench. He made 56 appearances (including four starts) for the Pacers during the 2025–26 campaign, recording averages of 9.4 points, 2.2 rebounds, and 5.1 assists. For the season, McConnell led the NBA with a 4.48 assists:turnover ratio (minimum 200 assist).

== Career statistics ==
Legend
GP	Games played	GS	Games started	MPG	Minutes per game
FG%	Field goal percentage	3P%	3-point field goal percentage	FT%	Free throw percentage
RPG	Rebounds per game	APG	Assists per game	SPG	Steals per game
BPG	Blocks per game	PPG	Points per game	**Bold**	Career high
*	Led the league

=== NBA ===
==== Regular season ====
Year	Team	GP	GS	MPG	FG%	3P%	FT%	RPG	APG	SPG	BPG	PPG
2015–16	Philadelphia	**81**	17	19.8	.470	.348	.634	3.1	4.5	1.2	.1	6.1
2016–17	Philadelphia	**81**	**51**	**26.3**	.461	.200	.811	3.1	**6.6**	1.7	.1	6.9
2017–18	Philadelphia	76	1	22.5	.499	.435	.795	3.0	4.0	1.2	.2	6.3
2018–19	Philadelphia	76	3	19.3	.525	.333	.784	2.3	3.4	1.0	.2	6.4
2019–20	Indiana	71	3	18.7	.516	.294	.833	2.7	5.0	.8	.2	6.5
2020–21	Indiana	69	3	26.0	**.559**	.313	.688	**3.7**	**6.6**	**1.9**	.3	8.6
2021–22	Indiana	27	8	24.2	.481	.303	.826	3.3	4.9	1.1	**.4**	8.5
2022–23	Indiana	75	6	20.4	.543	**.441**	.853	3.1	5.3	1.1	.1	8.7
2023–24	Indiana	71	4	18.2	.556	.409	.790	2.7	5.5	1.0	.1	**10.2**
2024–25	Indiana	79	1	17.9	.519	.306	.740	2.4	4.4	1.1	.3	9.1
2025–26	Indiana	56	4	17.2	.538	.320	**.862**	2.2	5.1	1.0	.2	9.4
Career		762	101	20.8	.518	.343	.782	2.9	5.0	1.2	.2	7.8

==== Playoffs ====
Year	Team	GP	GS	MPG	FG%	3P%	FT%	RPG	APG	SPG	BPG	PPG
2018	Philadelphia	10	**2**	15.5	**.694**	**.667**	.600	2.6	2.3	.6	.0	5.5
2019	Philadelphia	9	0	8.3	.444	—	—	.7	1.2	.2	**.1**	2.7
2020	Indiana	3	0	9.3	.375	—	.500	2.0	2.3	.0	.0	2.3
2024	Indiana	17	0	**20.5**	.486	.269	**.867**	3.1	**5.1**	**.9**	**.1**	**11.8**
2025	Indiana	**23***	0	17.5	.537	.421	.815	**3.2**	4.0	**.9**	**.1**	9.5
Career		62	2	16.3	.520	.354	.796	2.7	3.5	.7	.1	8.1

=== College ===
Year	Team	GP	GS	MPG	FG%	3P%	FT%	RPG	APG	SPG	BPG	PPG
2010–11	Duquesne	32	30	30.6	.498	.402	.683	3.8	4.4	**2.8**	.2	10.8
2011–12	Duquesne	31	31	**34.3**	**.509**	**.432**	**.836**	**4.4**	5.5	**2.8**	**.3**	**11.4**
2013–14	Arizona	**38**	**38**	32.3	.454	.360	.620	3.6	5.3	1.7	.2	8.4
2014–15	Arizona	**38**	**38**	30.5	.498	.321	.829	3.8	**6.3**	2.2	.1	10.4
Career		139	137	31.8	.490	.380	.749	3.9	5.4	2.3	.2	10.2

=== Franchise records ===
- Most steals in a game in franchise history. Indiana Pacers (10)
- First player in Philadelphia 76ers history to record a triple-double off the bench, during the 2017–18 season. In the final game of the same regular season Markelle Fultz achieved the same feat.

=== NBA records ===
- NBA Record most steals in a half (9).

== Personal life ==
McConnell's father, Tim Sr., is one of the most successful basketball coaches in Western Pennsylvania Interscholastic Athletic League history. After many successful runs with the Chartiers Valley High School boys' and girls' teams, he became the head coach of the Bishop Canevin High School boys' team, a position vacated by T.J.'s roommate at Duquesne University, Gino Palmosina. Tim Sr. often jogs at Collier Park, the location of the T.J. McConnell Memorial Court. He played at Waynesburg College from 1984 to 1986.

T.J. has two siblings: Matthew and Megan. Matthew "Matty" McConnell played basketball for Robert Morris University until graduating in 2019. Matthew and T.J. are the only two players in Chartiers Valley High School basketball history to accrue 2,000 points in their high school careers. Megan McConnell, also a former star basketball player at Chartiers Valley High School, was a lead guard at Duquesne University and played for the Phoenix Mercury.

T.J.'s aunt, Suzie McConnell-Serio, was an All-American at Penn State (1985–1988), Olympic gold medalist, and WNBA standout who was inducted to the Women's Basketball Hall of Fame in 2008. She started her college coaching career at Duquesne.

T.J. married his high school sweetheart, Valerie, in Bridgeville, Pennsylvania, at Holy Child Parish (now known as Corpus Christi Parish) in 2017. Then-teammate Nik Stauskas, and his Duquesne roommate, Palmosina, served as groomsmen.

McConnell is a minority shareholder in the Premier League soccer club Leeds United.

== Awards and honors ==
High school

- AP first-team all-state honors
- AP Pennsylvania Class 3A Player of the Year

College

- NCAA Tournament West Region All-Tournament Team (2015)
- District IX All-District Team USBWA (2015)
- Pac-12 Tournament All-Tournament Team (2015)
- First-team All-Pac-12 (2015)
- Second-team All-Pac-12 (2014)
- 2x Pac-12 All-Defensive Team (2014, 2015)
- Third-team All-Atlantic 10 (2012)
- Atlantic 10 All-Defensive Team (2012)
- Atlantic 10 Rookie of the Year (2011)
- Atlantic 10 All-Rookie Team (2011)
- ECAC Rookie of the Year (2011)
- CollegeInsider.com Freshman All-America (2011)

== See also ==
- List of National Basketball Association single-game steals leaders
