= Ben Sheppard (basketball) =

American basketball player (born 2001)

No. 26 – Indiana Pacers
- Position: Shooting guard
- League: NBA

Personal information
- Born: July 16, 2001 (age 25) Atlanta, Georgia, U.S.
- Listed height: 6 ft 6 in (1.98 m)
- Listed weight: 190 lb (86 kg)

Career information
- High school: Greater Atlanta Christian (Norcross, Georgia)
- College: Belmont (2019–2023)
- NBA draft: 2023: 1st round, 26th overall pick
- Drafted by: Indiana Pacers
- Playing career: 2023–present

Career history
- 2023–present: Indiana Pacers
- 2023–2024: →Indiana Mad Ants

Career highlights
- First-team All-MVC (2023); First-team All-OVC (2022)
- Stats at NBA.com
- Stats at Basketball Reference

Benjamin Lee Sheppard (born July 16, 2001) is an American professional basketball player for the Indiana Pacers of the National Basketball Association (NBA). He played college basketball for the Belmont Bruins before being selected by the Pacers in the first round of the 2023 NBA draft.

== Early life and high school career ==
Sheppard grew up in Atlanta, Georgia and attended Greater Atlanta Christian School (GAC). He averaged 13.7 points per game during his junior season as GAC won the Class AAA State Championship.

== College career ==
Sheppard played in 32 games averaging 2.9 points during his freshman season at Belmont. He became a starter going into his sophomore year and averaged 10.5 points on the year. Sheppard was named first team All-Ohio Valley Conference as a junior after averaging 16.2 points per game. He was named first team All-Missouri Valley Conference, to which the Bruins had moved, as a senior after averaging 18.8 points per game.

== Professional career ==
The Indiana Pacers selected Sheppard in the first round with the 26th overall pick in the 2023 NBA draft. On July 1, 2023, Sheppard signed his rookie contract with the Pacers alongside the 8th overall pick Jarace Walker.

On October 23, 2026, Sheppard sustained a meniscus tear in his left knee ahead of the team's season home opener against the Dallas Mavericks.

== Career statistics ==
Legend
GP	Games played	GS	Games started	MPG	Minutes per game
FG%	Field goal percentage	3P%	3-point field goal percentage	FT%	Free throw percentage
RPG	Rebounds per game	APG	Assists per game	SPG	Steals per game
BPG	Blocks per game	PPG	Points per game	**Bold**	Career high

=== NBA ===
==== Regular season ====
Year	Team	GP	GS	MPG	FG%	3P%	FT%	RPG	APG	SPG	BPG	PPG
2023–24	Indiana	57	1	14.3	.393	.314	.885	1.6	.9	**.6**	.0	4.4
2024–25	Indiana	63	9	19.5	.418	.342	**.889**	2.8	1.3	**.6**	**.2**	5.3
2025–26	Indiana	**65**	**20**	**21.4**	**.434**	**.362**	.765	**3.0**	**1.8**	**.6**	.1	**7.1**
Career		185	30	18.6	.419	.342	.827	2.5	1.4	.6	.1	5.6

==== Playoffs ====
Year	Team	GP	GS	MPG	FG%	3P%	FT%	RPG	APG	SPG	BPG	PPG
2024	Indiana	17	**2**	**19.7**	.437	.380	.778	**3.0**	**1.0**	**.5**	**.1**	**5.2**
2025	Indiana	**21**	0	14.0	**.471**	**.395**	**1.000**	1.9	.4	.4	.0	3.2
Career		38	2	16.5	.451	.386	.846	2.4	.7	.4	.1	4.1

=== College ===
Year	Team	GP	GS	MPG	FG%	3P%	FT%	RPG	APG	SPG	BPG	PPG
2019–20	Belmont	32	0	10.8	.386	.279	.667	2.2	.6	.4	.1	2.9
2020–21	Belmont	27	26	27.7	.473	.328	.689	4.4	2.2	1.0	.1	10.5
2021–22	Belmont	**33**	**33**	31.4	**.496**	.371	**.719**	3.9	1.6	1.2	**.2**	16.2
2022–23	Belmont	32	32	**34.4**	.475	**.415**	.684	**5.2**	**2.9**	**1.4**	**.2**	**18.8**
Career		124	91	26.0	.475	.370	.696	3.9	1.8	1.0	.1	12.2
