= Kendall Brown (basketball) =

American basketball player (born 2003)

No. 5 – Austin Spurs
- Position: Small forward / shooting guard
- League: NBA G League

Personal information
- Born: May 11, 2003 (age 23) Cottage Grove, Minnesota, U.S.
- Listed height: 6 ft 7 in (2.01 m)
- Listed weight: 205 lb (93 kg)

Career information
- High school: East Ridge (Woodbury, Minnesota); Sunrise Christian Academy (Bel Aire, Kansas)
- College: Baylor (2021–2022)
- NBA draft: 2022: 2nd round, 48th overall pick
- Drafted by: Minnesota Timberwolves
- Playing career: 2022–present

Career history
- 2022–2024: Indiana Pacers
- 2022–2024: →Fort Wayne / Indiana Mad Ants
- 2024–2025: Long Island Nets
- 2025–2026: Maine Celtics
- 2026–present: Austin Spurs

Career highlights
- Big 12 All-Freshman Team (2022); McDonald's All-American (2021); Nike Hoop Summit (2021)
- Stats at NBA.com
- Stats at Basketball Reference

Kendall Thomas Brown (born May 11, 2003) is an American professional basketball player for the Austin Spurs of the NBA G League. He played college basketball for the Baylor Bears. Brown was a consensus five-star recruit and one of the best small forwards in the 2021 class.

== High school career ==
As a sophomore at East Ridge High School in Woodbury, Minnesota, Brown averaged 17.6 points and led the team to its first state tournament appearance. After the season, he transferred to Sunrise Christian Academy in Bel Aire, Kansas. Brown was teammates with top recruit Kennedy Chandler. As a senior, he helped his team reach the GEICO Nationals title game. He was named to the McDonald's All-American Game, Jordan Brand Classic and Nike Hoop Summit rosters.

=== Recruiting ===
Brown was a consensus five-star recruit and one of the best small forwards in the 2021 class. On July 20, 2020, he committed to playing college basketball for Baylor over offers from Kansas and Arizona, among others. Brown is the highest-ranked recruit to come to Baylor since Isaiah Austin in 2012. He said that since he came from a Christian high school, he liked the fact that Baylor was a Christian university.

College recruiting
Name	Hometown	School	Height	Weight	Commit date
Kendall Brown; SF	Cottage Grove, MN	Sunrise Christian Academy (KS)	6 ft 8 in (2.03 m)	205 lb (93 kg)	Jul 20, 2020
Kendall Brown; SF	Recruit ratings: Rivals: 247Sports: ESPN: (92)				
Overall recruit ranking: Rivals: 11 247Sports: 17 ESPN: 17
Note: In many cases, Scout, Rivals, 247Sports, On3, and ESPN may conflict in their listings of height and weight.; In these cases, the average was taken. ESPN grades are on a 100-point scale.; Sources: "Baylor 2021 Basketball Commitments". Rivals.; "2021 Baylor Bears Recruiting Class". ESPN.; "2021 Team Ranking". Rivals.

== College career ==
Prior to his freshman season, Brown was voted Preseason Big 12 Conference Freshman of the Year. In his college debut, Brown scored 13 points in a 87–60 victory over Incarnate Word. He earned Big 12 Newcomer of the Week honors twice (December 20 and March 7). As a freshman, Brown averaged 9.7 points and 4.9 rebounds per game. At the end of the season, he was named to the Big 12 All-Freshman Team. On March 30, 2022, Brown declared for the 2022 NBA draft, forgoing his remaining college eligibility.

== Professional career ==
=== Indiana Pacers (2022–2024) ===
Brown was selected with the 48th overall pick in the 2022 NBA draft by his hometown team, the Minnesota Timberwolves. On June 23, 2022, the Timberwolves traded his draft rights to the Indiana Pacers in exchange for cash considerations and a 2026 second-round pick. On September 16, Brown signed a two-way contract with the Pacers. On February 27, 2023, he underwent surgery to address a tibia stress fracture in his right leg and was ruled out indefinitely by the Pacers. On July 25, 2023, Brown signed another two-way contract with the Pacers and on March 4, 2024, he signed a multi-year contract. On October 15, Brown was waived.

=== Long Island Nets (2024–2025) ===
On October 27, 2024, Brown joined the Long Island Nets, and on February 25, 2025, he signed a two-way contract with the Brooklyn Nets. He did not appear for Brooklyn before he was waived on March 4.

=== Maine Celtics (2025–2026) ===
Brown joined the Boston Celtics summer league team for the 2025 NBA Summer League. He was later cut alongside Jalen Bridges and Wendell Moore Jr. on October 16, 2025. In November 2025, he joined the Celtics' NBA G League affiliates, the Maine Celtics, ahead of the G League season.

== Career statistics ==
Legend
GP	Games played	GS	Games started	MPG	Minutes per game
FG%	Field goal percentage	3P%	3-point field goal percentage	FT%	Free throw percentage
RPG	Rebounds per game	APG	Assists per game	SPG	Steals per game
BPG	Blocks per game	PPG	Points per game	**Bold**	Career high

=== NBA ===
==== Regular season ====
Year	Team	GP	GS	MPG	FG%	3P%	FT%	RPG	APG	SPG	BPG	PPG
2022–23	Indiana	6	0	**6.7**	**.571**	.000	.500	**1.0**	**.5**	**.7**	.0	**1.5**
2023–24	Indiana	**15**	0	4.2	.533	.000	**.625**	.3	.3	.0	.0	1.4
Career		21	0	4.9	.545	.000	.600	.5	.4	.2	.0	1.4

==== Playoffs ====
Year	Team	GP	GS	MPG	FG%	3P%	FT%	RPG	APG	SPG	BPG	PPG
2024	Indiana	7	0	3.5	.333	—	—	.4	.3	.0	.1	.6
Career		7	0	3.5	.333	—	—	.4	.3	.0	.1	.6

=== College ===
Year	Team	GP	GS	MPG	FG%	3P%	FT%	RPG	APG	SPG	BPG	PPG
2021–22	Baylor	34	34	27.0	.584	.341	.689	4.9	1.9	1.0	.4	9.7

== Personal life ==
Brown's father, Courtney Sr., played professional basketball in South America, Switzerland and England, and was a member of the Harlem Globetrotters, before becoming a public school intervention specialist. His older brother, Courtney Jr., plays college basketball for St. Thomas (MN).
