= Andrew Nembhard =

Canadian basketball player (born 2000)

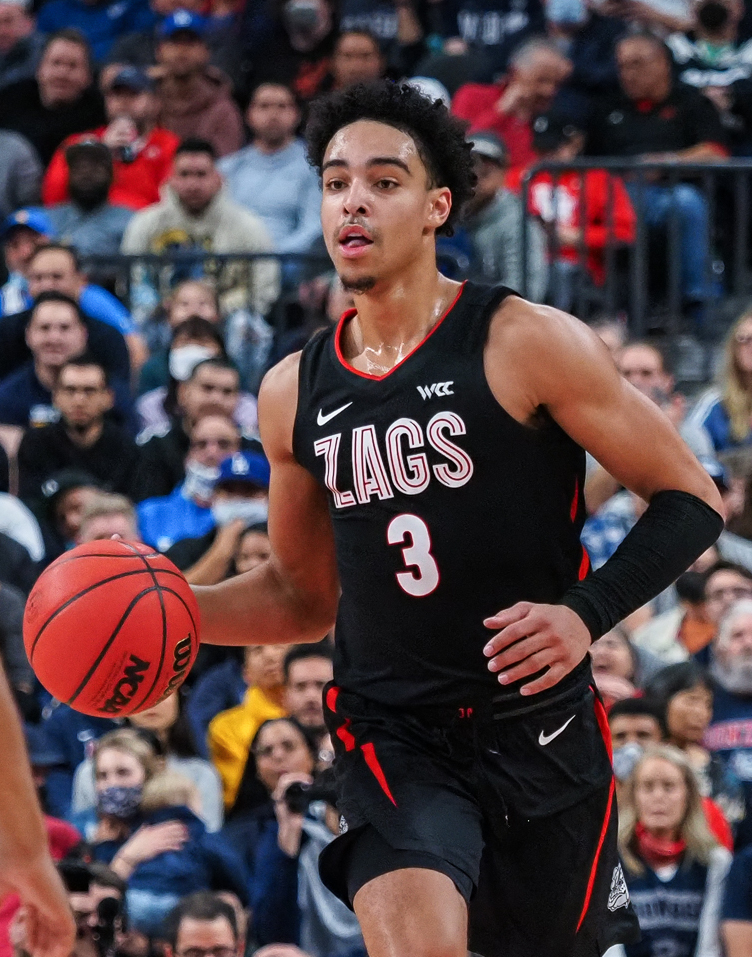
- Nembhard with Gonzaga in 2021

No. 2 – Indiana Pacers
- Position: Point guard / shooting guard
- League: NBA

Personal information
- Born: January 16, 2000 (age 26) Aurora, Ontario, Canada
- Listed height: 6 ft 4 in (1.93 m)
- Listed weight: 191 lb (87 kg)

Career information
- High school: Vaughan Secondary School (Vaughan, Ontario); Montverde Academy (Montverde, Florida)
- College: Florida (2018–2020); Gonzaga (2020–2022)
- NBA draft: 2022: 2nd round, 31st overall pick
- Drafted by: Indiana Pacers
- Playing career: 2022–present

Career history
- 2022–present: Indiana Pacers

Career highlights
- First-team All-WCC (2022); Second-team All-WCC (2021); WCC Sixth Man of the Year (2021); WCC tournament MOP (2022); SEC All-Freshman Team (2019)
- Stats at NBA.com
- Stats at Basketball Reference
Medals
Men's basketball
Representing Canada
FIBA Americas U18 Championship
Silver medal – second place	2018 Canada	Team

Andrew William Nembhard (/ˈnɛmhɑːrd/ NEM-hard; born January 16, 2000) is a Canadian professional basketball player for the Indiana Pacers of the National Basketball Association (NBA). He played college basketball for the Florida Gators and Gonzaga Bulldogs. He was selected by the Pacers with the 31st overall pick in the second round of the 2022 NBA draft.

== College career ==
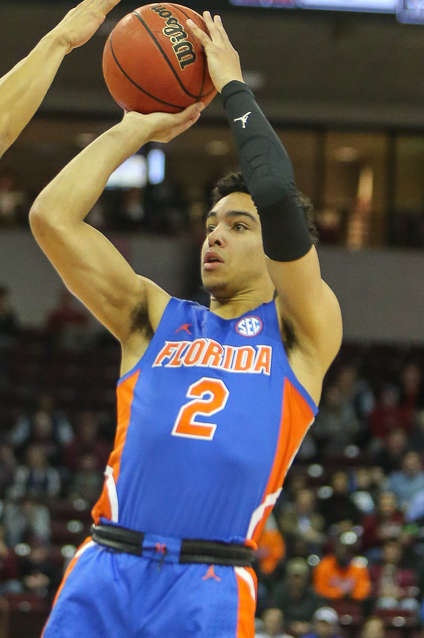
Nembhard with Florida in 2020

Nembhard was recruited to the University of Florida from Montverde Academy in Montverde, Florida. In his freshman season with the Gators, he started every game and tallied the fourth-highest freshman assist total in school history. After averaging 8.0 points, 2.9 rebounds and 5.4 assists, and finishing fifth in the Southeastern Conference (SEC) in assist-turnover ratio, Nembhard was named to the conference all-Freshman team. Just a few days later, Nembhard hit a buzzer-beater to upset Louisiana State University (LSU) in the 2019 SEC tournament.

Nembhard declared for the 2019 NBA draft, but ultimately chose to return to the Gators for his sophomore season. As a sophomore, Nembhard averaged 11.2 points, 5.6 assists, and 3.0 rebounds per game and led the SEC with a 2.2 assist-to-turnover ratio. Following the season he declared for the 2020 NBA draft but hired an NCAA-certified agent, allowing him the option to return to Florida. On May 30, 2020, Nembhard withdrew from the draft and entered the NCAA transfer portal.

On June 23, 2020, Nembhard announced that he would transfer to Gonzaga. He chose the Bulldogs over offers from Duke, USC, Memphis, Georgetown and Stanford. He was granted a waiver for immediate eligibility on November 24.

In his first Gonzaga season, he primarily came off the bench (though he played more minutes per game than two Bulldogs starters), averaging 9.2 points, 2.4 rebounds, and 4.4 assists per game for a team that entered its conference tournament unbeaten. Nembhard was named the West Coast Conference's inaugural Sixth Man of the Year, and was also named to the all-conference second team. He averaged 11.8 points, 5.8 assists, 3.4 rebounds and 1.6 steals per game as a senior. Nembhard was named to the First Team All-WCC. On April 21, 2022, Nembhard declared for the 2022 NBA draft, forgoing his remaining college eligibility.

== Professional career ==
=== Indiana Pacers (2022–present) ===
Nembhard was selected with the 31st overall pick by the Indiana Pacers. Nembhard joined the Pacers' 2022 NBA Summer League roster. In his Summer League debut, Nembhard scored five points, five rebounds, and five assists in a 96–84 win over the Charlotte Hornets. On July 22, 2022, Nembhard signed a four–year, $8.6M rookie contract with the Pacers, the largest rookie contract ever given to a second-rounder. On November 28, Nembhard scored a buzzer-beating, game-winning three-pointer in a 116–115 win over the Los Angeles Lakers. On December 5, with Tyrese Haliburton injured, Nembhard scored a career-high 31 points, 13 assists, 8 rebounds, and 5 three-pointers in a win over the Golden State Warriors.

On January 31, 2023, Nembhard was named a 2023 NBA Rising Star alongside standout rookie teammate Bennedict Mathurin. Nembhard recorded back–to–back 20–point games with 24 points on March 16 against the Milwaukee Bucks, and 22 points on 9–14 shooting on March 18 against the Philadelphia 76ers. On March 22, in a win against the Toronto Raptors, Nembhard recorded another double–double with 25 points and 10 assists on 11–17 shooting. On March 28, as a starter against the Milwaukee Bucks, Nembhard recorded a double–double with 15 points and a career–high 15 assists.

On May 10, 2024, in a second-round game of the playoffs against the New York Knicks, Nembhard hit a game winning three–pointer with 16 seconds on the clock to help the Pacers extend their series lead to 2–1. The three was the longest of his career up to that point.

On July 26, 2024, Nembhard signed a three-year, $59 million extension that would keep him under contract through 2028.

== National team career ==
Nembhard represented Canada in FIBA competition at the U-16, U-17 and U-18 levels. In 2019, he made the senior national team for the 2019 FIBA World Cup. He was named to Canada's roster for the 2024 Summer Olympics in Paris.

== Personal life ==
Nembhard is of Jamaican descent through his father, Claude. He has one younger brother, Ryan, who also played basketball at Gonzaga, signed with the Dallas Mavericks as an undrafted free agent in 2025 and is currently playing for the Denver Nuggets.

== Career statistics ==
Legend
GP	Games played	GS	Games started	MPG	Minutes per game
FG%	Field goal percentage	3P%	3-point field goal percentage	FT%	Free throw percentage
RPG	Rebounds per game	APG	Assists per game	SPG	Steals per game
BPG	Blocks per game	PPG	Points per game	**Bold**	Career high
*	Led the league

=== NBA ===
==== Regular season ====
Year	Team	GP	GS	MPG	FG%	3P%	FT%	RPG	APG	SPG	BPG	PPG
2022–23	Indiana	**75**	63	27.6	.441	.350	.790	2.7	4.5	.9	**.2**	9.5
2023–24	Indiana	68	47	25.0	**.498**	.357	.804	2.1	4.1	.9	.1	9.2
2024–25	Indiana	65	**65**	28.9	.458	.291	.794	**3.3**	5.0	**1.2**	**.2**	10.0
2025–26	Indiana	57	57	**31.3**	.442	**.361**	**.825**	2.8	**7.7**	.9	.1	**16.9**
Career		265	232	28.1	.457	.344	.809	2.7	5.2	1.0	.1	11.1

==== Playoffs ====
Year	Team	GP	GS	MPG	FG%	3P%	FT%	RPG	APG	SPG	BPG	PPG
2024	Indiana	17	17	32.6	**.560**	**.483**	.769	**3.3**	**5.5**	.4	**.2**	**14.9**
2025	Indiana	**23***	**23***	**33.4**	.471	.465	**.804**	3.2	4.7	**1.5**	**.2**	12.5
Career		40	40	33.1	.511	.473	.792	3.3	5.0	1.0	.2	13.5

=== College ===
Year	Team	GP	GS	MPG	FG%	3P%	FT%	RPG	APG	SPG	BPG	PPG
2018–19	Florida	**36**	**36**	32.9	.414	.347	.764	2.9	5.4	1.2	**.1**	8.0
2019–20	Florida	31	31	**33.2**	.441	.308	.775	3.0	5.6	1.1	**.1**	11.2
2020–21	Gonzaga	32	16	29.9	**.480**	.323	.754	2.4	4.4	1.1	**.1**	9.2
2021–22	Gonzaga	32	32	32.2	.452	**.383**	**.873**	**3.4**	**5.8**	**1.6**	**.1**	**11.8**
Career		131	115	32.1	.446	.343	.790	2.9	5.3	1.2	.1	10.0
