= Isaiah Jackson (basketball) =

American basketball player (born 2002)

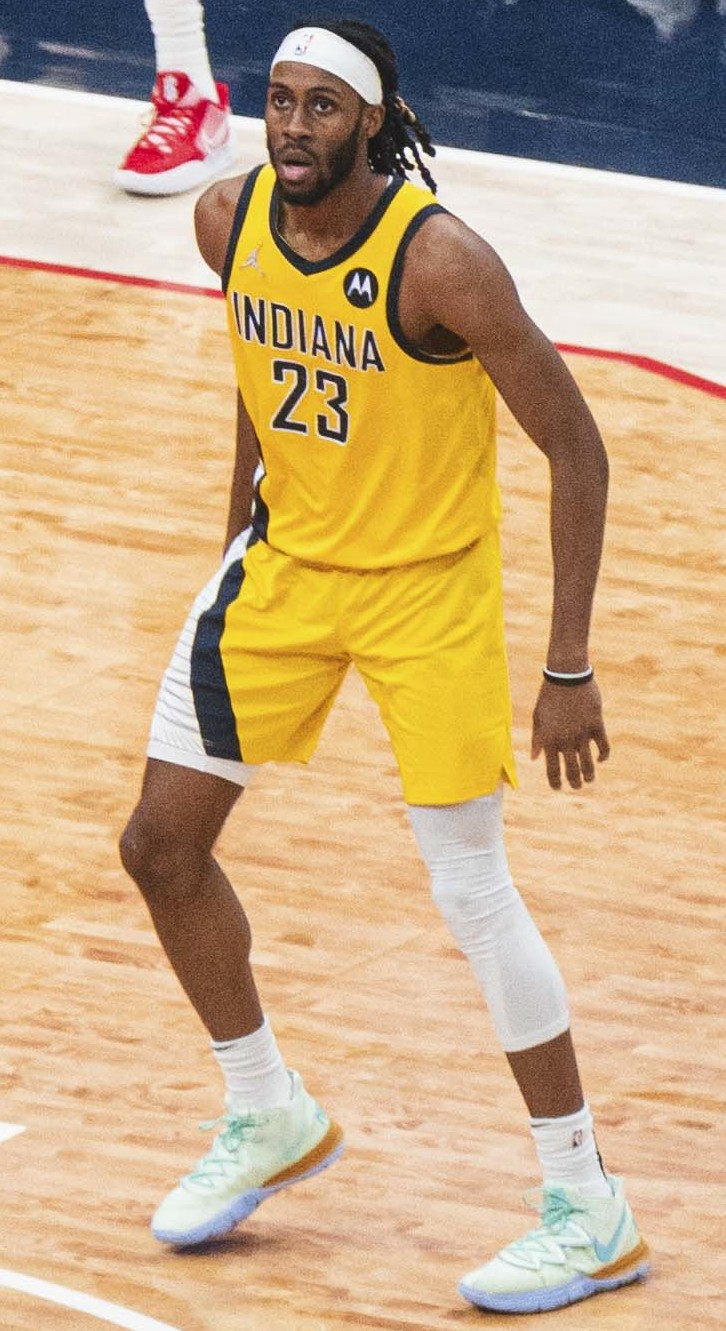
- Jackson with the Indiana Pacers in 2022

No. 23 – Los Angeles Clippers
- Position: Power forward
- League: NBA

Personal information
- Born: January 10, 2002 (age 24) Pontiac, Michigan, U.S.
- Listed height: 6 ft 8 in (2.03 m)
- Listed weight: 205 lb (93 kg)

Career information
- High school: Lutheran Northwest (Rochester Hills, Michigan); Old Redford Academy (Detroit, Michigan); SPIRE Academy (Geneva, Ohio); Waterford Mott (Waterford, Michigan)
- College: Kentucky (2020–2021)
- NBA draft: 2021: 1st round, 22nd overall pick
- Drafted by: Los Angeles Lakers
- Playing career: 2021–present

Career history
- 2021–2026: Indiana Pacers
- 2021–2023: →Fort Wayne Mad Ants
- 2026–present: Los Angeles Clippers

Career highlights
- SEC All-Defensive Team (2021); SEC All-Freshman Team (2021)
- Stats at NBA.com
- Stats at Basketball Reference

Isaiah Ju'mar Jackson (born January 10, 2002) is an American professional basketball player for the Los Angeles Clippers of the National Basketball Association (NBA). He played college basketball for the Kentucky Wildcats. He was selected by the Los Angeles Lakers in the first round of the 2021 NBA draft before being traded to the Indiana Pacers.

== High school career ==
As a freshman, Jackson played basketball for Lutheran Northwest High School in Rochester Hills, Michigan. He moved to Old Redford Academy in Detroit for his sophomore season. As a junior, Jackson competed for SPIRE Academy in Geneva, Ohio alongside LaMelo Ball and his Old Redford teammate Rocket Watts. He averaged 14.9 points and 10.4 rebounds per game. For his senior season, he transferred to Waterford Mott High School in Waterford, Michigan. Jackson averaged 19.1 points, 13 rebounds and 7.7 blocks per game as a senior. He was named to the Jordan Brand Classic roster.

=== Recruiting ===
Considered a five-star recruit by Rivals, Jackson committed to playing college basketball for Kentucky over offers from Alabama and Syracuse.

College recruiting
Name	Hometown	School	Height	Weight	Commit date
Isaiah Jackson; PF	Pontiac, MI	Waterford Mott (MI)	6 ft 9 in (2.06 m)	200 lb (91 kg)	Nov 16, 2019
Isaiah Jackson; PF	Recruit ratings: Rivals: 247Sports: ESPN: (89)				
Overall recruit ranking: Rivals: 28 247Sports: 34 ESPN: 34
Note: In many cases, Scout, Rivals, 247Sports, On3, and ESPN may conflict in their listings of height and weight.; In these cases, the average was taken. ESPN grades are on a 100-point scale.; Sources: "Kentucky 2020 Basketball Commitments". Rivals.; "2020 Kentucky Wildcats Recruiting Class". ESPN.; "2020 Team Ranking". Rivals.

== College career ==
On December 1, 2020, Jackson recorded seven points, 12 rebounds and a career-high eight blocks in a 65–62 loss to seventh-ranked Kansas at the Champions Classic. He had the most single-game blocks by a Kentucky player since Willie Cauley-Stein in 2013. As a freshman, Jackson averaged 8.4 points, 6.6 rebounds and an SEC-high 2.6 blocks per game, earning SEC All-Defensive and All-Freshman Team honors. On March 17, 2021, he declared for the 2021 NBA draft while maintaining his college eligibility. He later signed with an agent, forgoing his remaining eligibility.

== Professional career ==
Jackson was selected with the 22nd pick of the 2021 NBA draft by the Los Angeles Lakers and then traded to the Indiana Pacers. On October 23, he made his NBA debut, scoring one point in two minutes of action during a 102–91 overtime win over the Miami Heat. On January 31, 2022, Jackson logged a career-high 26 points, alongside ten rebounds and two blocks, in a 122–116 win over the Los Angeles Clippers. He made 36 appearances (including 15 starts) for Indiana during his rookie season, averaging 8.3 points, 4.1 rebounds, and 0.3 assists.

Jackson played in 63 contests (including 12 starts) for the Pacers during the 2022–23 NBA season, averaging 7.2 points, 4.5 rebounds, and 0.8 assists. He made 59 appearances (three starts) for Indiana in the 2023–24 season, logging averages of 6.5 points, 4.0 rebounds, and 0.8 assists.

Jackson tore his Achilles tendon on November 1, 2024 against the New Orleans Pelicans, ending his season. Prior to the injury, he had averaged 7.0 points, 5.6 rebounds, and 1.0 assist over five appearances (one start).

On July 11, 2025, Jackson re-signed with the Pacers on a three-year, $21 million contract. Jackson made 38 appearances (14 starts) for the Pacers during the 2025–26 season, recording averages of 6.4 points, 5.6 rebounds, and 0.8 assists.

On February 5, 2026, Jackson, Bennedict Mathurin, two first-round picks and one second-round pick were traded to the Los Angeles Clippers in exchange for Ivica Zubac and Kobe Brown.

== Career statistics ==
Legend
GP	Games played	GS	Games started	MPG	Minutes per game
FG%	Field goal percentage	3P%	3-point field goal percentage	FT%	Free throw percentage
RPG	Rebounds per game	APG	Assists per game	SPG	Steals per game
BPG	Blocks per game	PPG	Points per game	**Bold**	Career high

=== NBA ===
==== Regular season ====
Year	Team	GP	GS	MPG	FG%	3P%	FT%	RPG	APG	SPG	BPG	PPG
2021–22	Indiana	36	**15**	15.0	.563	**.313**	.682	4.1	.3	**.7**	1.4	**8.3**
2022–23	Indiana	**63**	12	16.5	.563	.143	.651	4.5	.8	.5	1.5	7.2
2023–24	Indiana	59	3	13.1	.665	.000	**.716**	4.0	.8	.6	1.0	6.5
2024–25	Indiana	5	1	**16.8**	.609	—	.500	**5.6**	1.0	.6	**1.6**	7.0
2025–26	Indiana	38	14	**16.8**	.582	.000	.689	**5.6**	.8	**.7**	.8	6.4
2025–26	L.A. Clippers	17	0	15.9	**.764**	.000	.548	4.6	**1.2**	.6	1.2	7.5
Career		219	45	15.3	.605	.189	.666	4.5	.8	.6	1.2	7.0

==== Playoffs ====
Year	Team	GP	GS	MPG	FG%	3P%	FT%	RPG	APG	SPG	BPG	PPG
2024	Indiana	15	0	10.2	.535	—	.611	3.2	.5	.2	.9	3.8
Career		15	0	10.2	.535	—	.611	3.2	.5	.2	.9	3.8

=== College ===
Year	Team	GP	GS	MPG	FG%	3P%	FT%	RPG	APG	SPG	BPG	PPG
2020–21	Kentucky	25	18	20.8	.540	.000	.700	6.6	.7	.8	2.6	8.4
