= Mike Weinar =

American basketball player (born 1984)

Personal information
- Born: July 23, 1984 (age 42) Urbana, Illinois, U.S.

Career information
- High school: Bronson High School
- College: Florida
- Coaching career: 2006–present

Career history

Coaching
- 2006–2008: Florida (GA)
- 2008–2021: Dallas Mavericks (assistant)
- 2021–2025: Indiana Pacers (assistant)

Career highlights
- NBA champion (2011)

Mike Weinar (born July 23, 1984) is an American basketball coach who last served as an assistant coach for the Indiana Pacers of the National Basketball Association (NBA). Previously he served as an assistant coach for the Dallas Mavericks.

== Coaching career ==
=== Florida (2006-2008) ===
From 2003 to 2006, Weinar served as a student manager with the University of Florida Men's Basketball Program. 2006 to 2008, Weinar served as a graduate assistant. During his tenure at the University of Florida, he was a part of back to back National Championship teams in 2005-06 and 2006–07.

=== Dallas Mavericks (2008-2021) ===
In 2008 Weinar was hired by the Dallas Mavericks as a Special Assistant to the Head Coach. In 2015 Weinar was promoted to assistant coach. Weinar led Dallas to the 2017 Orlando Summer Pro League Championship as well as guiding the 2019 NBA Summer League Mavericks to a playoff appearance as the head coach.

=== Indiana Pacers (2021-2025) ===
In 2021, Weinar, with Lloyd Pierce and Ronald Nored, was hired by the Indiana Pacers as an assistant coach.

On August 22, 2025, Weinar and the Pacers mutually agreed to part ways.
