= 2025 NBA Cup =

Basketball tournament

- Official promotional poster for the championship game

Tournament information
- Location: Local NBA cities (group stage and quarterfinals); Las Vegas Strip (semifinals and championship game)
- Date: October 31 – December 16, 2025
- Venues: Local NBA arenas (group stage and quarterfinals); T-Mobile Arena (semifinals and championship game)
- Teams: 30
- Purse: See prize money

Final positions
- Champions: New York Knicks (1st title)
- Runner-up: San Antonio Spurs
- MVP: Jalen Brunson (New York Knicks)

The 2025 NBA Cup (known as the Emirates NBA Cup for sponsorship reasons) was a multi-stage basketball tournament held as part of the 2025–26 NBA season. It was the third edition of the NBA Cup. All 30 teams participated, each playing four regular season games that counted towards the tournament's group stage standings. All games in the knockout round, except for the championship game, also counted towards the regular season standings. The tournament's semifinals and championship game were played at T-Mobile Arena on the Las Vegas Strip.

The Milwaukee Bucks were the defending champions, but were eliminated in the group stage by the New York Knicks, who would go on to beat the San Antonio Spurs in the championship game to win their first NBA Cup. The NBA Finals at the end of this season would feature a rematch of this championship game to become the first teams to face each other in both the NBA Cup and the NBA Finals in the same season; and it was also a rematch of the 1999 Finals. The Knicks went on to defeat the Spurs in that Finals for the league championship, making them the first team to win both the NBA Cup and the Larry O'Brien Trophy in the same season.

== Format ==
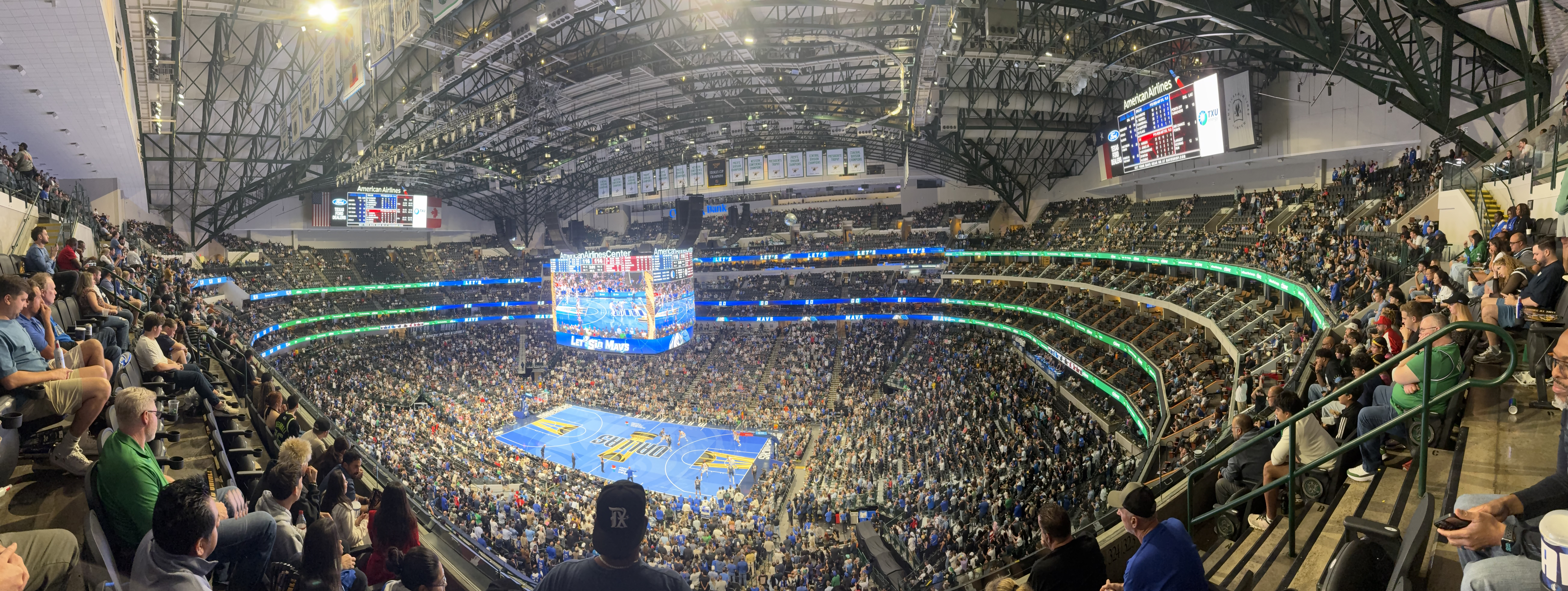
Panoramic view of the NBA Cup court of the Dallas Mavericks as seen during their West Group B game against the Los Angeles Clippers on November 14 at American Airlines Center.

In the group stage, each conference was divided into three groups with five teams each, for a total of six groups. Regular season games played on Tuesdays and Fridays between October 12 and November 28 counted in the regular season standings and the NBA Cup standings. Each team played one game against each of the other teams in its group, for a total of four games (two at home and two on the road).

If two or more teams in a group had equal records upon completion of group play, the following tiebreakers applied in this order:

1. Head-to-head record in the group stage
2. Point differential in the group stage (excluding overtime)
3. Total points scored in the group stage (excluding overtime)
4. Regular season record from the 2024–25 regular season
5. Random drawing

Note: Overtime scoring did not count towards the point differential and total points tiebreakers in the Emirates NBA Cup. A team's point differential was "0" in Group Play games that went to overtime, and a team's total points scored excluded points scored in overtime.

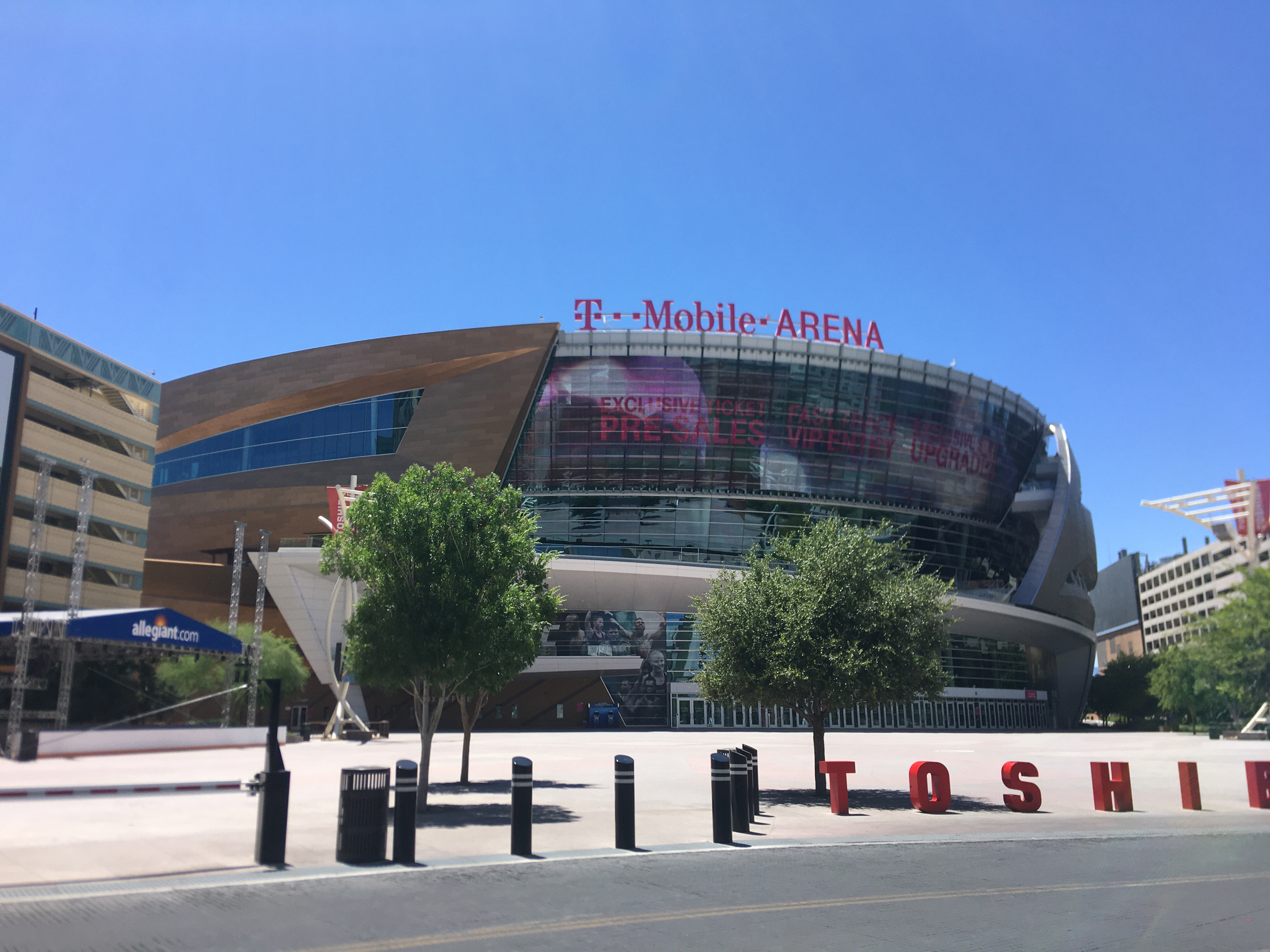
T-Mobile Arena in 2020

Each group's winner then advanced to the knockout stage, and one wild card from each conference—the group runner-up with the best group stage record. The knockout stage was a single-elimination tournament. Quarterfinal games were played in local NBA markets on December 9 and 10, with the teams with the top two group stage records in each conference hosting, and the best team in group-play games hosted the wild-card team. The semifinals were played on December 13, and the championship on December 16. The final two rounds were played at T-Mobile Arena on the Las Vegas Strip.

Quarterfinal and semifinal games counted as regular season games, affecting teams' positions in league standings, but the championship game did not. Statistics from the championship game were also not counted in regular season totals.

To balance the regular season, the teams that did not make the knockout stage played two additional consolation games on December 11 or 12 and 14 or 15, against each other in the same conference, while teams that were eliminated in the quarterfinals played one additional consolation game against each other (from the same conference) on December 14 or 15.

While the knockout stage was played, the 22 teams that did not qualify for the knockout stage each played two additional regular season games, one home and one away, to complete each team's 82 game regular season schedule. Among these 22 total matchups, 20 were intra-conference games, with an attempt by the league to schedule as many pairs of teams that were originally scheduled to only play each other three times during the regular season. The other two matchups were interconference games, as there was an odd number of teams in each conference (11). These two interconference matchups featured four of the six teams that finished last in their respective group.

=== Prize money ===
Players on teams advancing to the knockout stage received prize money as follows:

- Players on teams that lost in the quarterfinals: $51,497 each
- Players on teams that lost in the semifinals: $102,994 each
- Players on the tournament runner-up team: $205,988 each
- Players on the tournament championship team: $514,971 each

== Draw ==
=== Pots ===
Teams were allocated into five pots per conference based on the 2024–25 regular season standings. Pot 1 contained the teams with the top three regular season records in each conference, while Pot 2 contained the teams with the fourth- to sixth-best records and so forth, concluding with Pot 5, which contained the teams with the bottom three (thirteenth through fifteenth) records.

Eastern Conference in the 2025 NBA Cup
| Pot | # | Team | Record | |
| Pot | # | Team | W | L |
|---|---|---|---|---|
| 1 | 1 | Cleveland Cavaliers | 64 | 18 |
| 1 | 2 | Boston Celtics | 61 | 21 |
| 1 | 3 | New York Knicks | 51 | 31 |
| 2 | 4 | Indiana Pacers | 50 | 32 |
| 2 | 5 | Milwaukee Bucks | 48 | 34 |
| 2 | 6 | Detroit Pistons | 44 | 38 |
| 3 | 7 | Orlando Magic | 41 | 41 |
| 3 | 8 | Atlanta Hawks | 40 | 42 |
| 3 | 9 | Chicago Bulls | 39 | 43 |
| 4 | 10 | Miami Heat | 37 | 45 |
| 4 | 11 | Toronto Raptors | 30 | 52 |
| 4 | 12 | Brooklyn Nets | 26 | 56 |
| 5 | 13 | Philadelphia 76ers | 24 | 58 |
| 5 | 14 | Charlotte Hornets | 19 | 63 |
| 5 | 15 | Washington Wizards | 18 | 64 |

Western Conference in the 2025 NBA Cup
| Pot | # | Team | Record | |
| Pot | # | Team | W | L |
|---|---|---|---|---|
| 1 | 1 | Oklahoma City Thunder | 68 | 14 |
| 1 | 2 | Houston Rockets | 52 | 30 |
| 1 | 3 | Los Angeles Lakers | 50 | 32 |
| 2 | 4 | Denver Nuggets | 50 | 32 |
| 2 | 5 | Los Angeles Clippers | 50 | 32 |
| 2 | 6 | Minnesota Timberwolves | 49 | 33 |
| 3 | 7 | Golden State Warriors | 48 | 34 |
| 3 | 8 | Memphis Grizzlies | 48 | 34 |
| 3 | 9 | Sacramento Kings | 40 | 42 |
| 4 | 10 | Dallas Mavericks | 39 | 43 |
| 4 | 11 | Phoenix Suns | 36 | 46 |
| 4 | 12 | Portland Trail Blazers | 36 | 46 |
| 5 | 13 | San Antonio Spurs | 34 | 48 |
| 5 | 14 | New Orleans Pelicans | 21 | 61 |
| 5 | 15 | Utah Jazz | 17 | 65 |

=== Draw results ===
The groups were revealed on July 9, 2025.

Eastern Conference
| Group A | | Group B | | Group C | |
|---|---|---|---|---|---|
| 1 | Cleveland Cavaliers | 2 | Boston Celtics | 3 | New York Knicks |
| 4 | Indiana Pacers | 6 | Detroit Pistons | 5 | Milwaukee Bucks |
| 8 | Atlanta Hawks | 7 | Orlando Magic | 9 | Chicago Bulls |
| 11 | Toronto Raptors | 12 | Brooklyn Nets | 10 | Miami Heat |
| 15 | Washington Wizards | 13 | Philadelphia 76ers | 14 | Charlotte Hornets |

Western Conference
| Group A | | Group B | | Group C | |
|---|---|---|---|---|---|
| 1 | Oklahoma City Thunder | 3 | Los Angeles Lakers | 2 | Houston Rockets |
| 6 | Minnesota Timberwolves | 5 | Los Angeles Clippers | 4 | Denver Nuggets |
| 9 | Sacramento Kings | 8 | Memphis Grizzlies | 7 | Golden State Warriors |
| 11 | Phoenix Suns | 10 | Dallas Mavericks | 12 | Portland Trail Blazers |
| 15 | Utah Jazz | 14 | New Orleans Pelicans | 13 | San Antonio Spurs |

== Group stage ==
=== East group A ===
| Pos | Team | Pld | W | L | PF | PA | PD | Qualification |
|---|---|---|---|---|---|---|---|---|
| 1 | Toronto Raptors | 4 | 4 | 0 | 458 | 403 | +55 | Advanced to knockout rounds |
| 2 | Atlanta Hawks | 4 | 2 | 2 | 468 | 472 | −4 | |
| 3 | Cleveland Cavaliers | 4 | 2 | 2 | 492 | 466 | +26 | |
| 4 | Indiana Pacers | 4 | 1 | 3 | 431 | 431 | 0 | |
| 5 | Washington Wizards | 4 | 1 | 3 | 443 | 520 | −77 | |

Source: NBA

Games

Note: Times are Eastern Time (UTC−4 or UTC−5) as listed by the NBA. If the venue is located in a different time zone, the local time is also given.

NBA League Pass

October 31
7:00 p.m.

Recap

Atlanta Hawks 128, Indiana Pacers 108
Scoring by quarter: 32–29, 31–30, 34–17, 31–32
| Pts: Jalen Johnson (22); Rebs: Jalen Johnson (13); Asts: Jalen Johnson (8) | Pts: Pascal Siakam (18); Rebs: Isaiah Jackson (10); Asts: Pascal Siakam (5) |

Gainbridge Fieldhouse, Indianapolis, IN
Attendance: 16,212
Referees: Sean Corbin, Tyler Ford, Nate Green

NBA League Pass, TSN

October 31
7:30 p.m.

Recap

Toronto Raptors 112, Cleveland Cavaliers 101
Scoring by quarter: 30–22, 18–21, 33–34, 31–24
| Pts: Barrett, Battle, Ingram (20); Rebs: Scottie Barnes (10); Asts: Barnes, Quickley (6) | Pts: Evan Mobley (29); Rebs: Evan Mobley (8); Asts: Lonzo Ball (5) |

Rocket Arena, Cleveland, OH
Attendance: 19,432
Referees: Brett Nansel, Scott Twardoski, Justin Van Duyne

NBA League Pass

November 7
7:00 p.m.

Recap

Cleveland Cavaliers 148, Washington Wizards 115
Scoring by quarter: 39–26, 37–34, 33–27, 39–28
| Pts: Donovan Mitchell (24); Rebs: Jarrett Allen (14); Asts: Darius Garland (9) | Pts: CJ McCollum (25); Rebs: Justin Champagnie (11); Asts: Bub Carrington (11) |

Capital One Arena, Washington, DC
Attendance: 14,054
Referees: Ray Acosta, Jonathan Sterling, Danielle Scott

NBA League Pass, TSN

November 7
7:30 p.m.

Recap

Toronto Raptors 109, Atlanta Hawks 97
Scoring by quarter: 26–26, 18–27, 29–24, 36–20
| Pts: Brandon Ingram (20); Rebs: Barnes, Poeltl (10); Asts: Immanuel Quickley (6) | Pts: Jalen Johnson (21); Rebs: Onyeka Okongwu (11); Asts: Dyson Daniels (8) |

State Farm Arena, Atlanta, GA
Attendance: 16,340
Referees: Zach Zarba, Scott Twardoski, Suyash Mehta

NBA on Prime

November 21
7:00 p.m.

Recap

Indiana Pacers 109, Cleveland Cavaliers 120
Scoring by quarter: 31–33, 24–29, 26–38, 28–20
| Pts: Andrew Nembhard (32); Rebs: Pascal Siakam (9); Asts: Andrew Nembhard (8) | Pts: Donovan Mitchell (32); Rebs: Evan Mobley (12); Asts: Darius Garland (7) |

Rocket Arena, Cleveland, OH
Attendance: 19,432
Referees: Sean Corbin, Michael Smith, Curtis Blair

NBA League Pass, SN1

November 21
7:30 p.m.

Recap

Washington Wizards 110, Toronto Raptors 140
Scoring by quarter: 20–31, 27–26, 30–48, 33–35
| Pts: CJ McCollum (20); Rebs: Champagnie, Coulibaly, George, Kispert, McCollum, Vukčević (3); Asts: Champagnie, George, Middleton (4) | Pts: Barrett, Ingram (24); Rebs: Jakob Poeltl (9); Asts: Jamal Shead (10) |

Scotiabank Arena, Toronto, ON
Attendance: 19,800
Referees: Marc Davis, Matt Kallio, Andy Nagy

NBA League Pass

November 25
7:00 p.m.

Recap

Atlanta Hawks 113, Washington Wizards 132
Scoring by quarter: 23–45, 32–32, 23–34, 35–21
| Pts: Kristaps Porziņģis (22); Rebs: Dyson Daniels (9); Asts: Daniels, Johnson (7) | Pts: CJ McCollum (46); Rebs: Alex Sarr (11); Asts: Khris Middleton (12) |

Capital One Arena, Washington, DC
Attendance: 15,522
Referees: Curtis Blair, Justin Van Duyne, Tyler Ricks

NBA League Pass, TSN

November 26
7:30 p.m.

Recap

Indiana Pacers 95, Toronto Raptors 97
Scoring by quarter: 25–21, 24–29, 21–26, 25–21
| Pts: T. J. McConnell (16); Rebs: Jarace Walker (9); Asts: T.J. McConnell (6) | Pts: Brandon Ingram (26); Rebs: Scottie Barnes (10); Asts: Immanuel Quickley (6) |

Scotiabank Arena, Toronto, ON
Attendance: 18,484
Referees: Courtney Kirkland, Marat Kogut, Sha'Rae Mitchell

NBA League Pass

November 28
7:30 p.m.

Recap

Cleveland Cavaliers 123, Atlanta Hawks 130
Scoring by quarter: 23–33, 39–27, 28–37, 33–33
| Pts: Donovan Mitchell (42); Rebs: Evan Mobley (14); Asts: Darius Garland | Pts: Jalen Johnson (29); Rebs: Jalen Johnson (12); Asts: Jalen Johnson (12) |

State Farm Arena, Atlanta, GA
Attendance: 16,124
Referees: Tony Brothers, Tre Maddox, Matt Myers

NBA League Pass

November 28
7:30 p.m.

Recap

Washington Wizards 86, Indiana Pacers 119
Scoring by quarter: 24–30, 28–34, 21–30, 13–25
| Pts: Alex Sarr (24); Rebs: Alex Sarr (9); Asts: George, Middleton (4) | Pts: Pascal Siakam (24); Rebs: Robinson-Earl, Siakam (11); Asts: T. J. McConnell (8) |

Gainbridge Fieldhouse, Indianapolis, IN
Attendance: 16,515
Referees: Tyler Ford, Jason Goldenberg, Robert Hussey

=== East group B ===
| Pos | Team | Pld | W | L | PF | PA | PD | Qualification |
|---|---|---|---|---|---|---|---|---|
| 1 | Orlando Magic | 4 | 4 | 0 | 484 | 420 | +64 | Advanced to knockout rounds |
| 2 | Boston Celtics | 4 | 2 | 2 | 441 | 458 | −17 | |
| 3 | Detroit Pistons | 4 | 2 | 2 | 462 | 441 | +21 | |
| 4 | Philadelphia 76ers | 4 | 1 | 3 | 431 | 470 | −39 | |
| 5 | Brooklyn Nets | 4 | 1 | 3 | 421 | 450 | −29 | |

Source: NBA

Games

Note: Times are Eastern Time (UTC−4 or UTC−5) as listed by the NBA. If the venue is located in a different time zone, the local time is also given.

NBA on Prime

October 31
7:00 p.m.

Recap

Boston Celtics 109, Philadelphia 76ers 108
Scoring by quarter: 38–25, 30–32, 21–25, 20–26
| Pts: Jaylen Brown (32); Rebs: Josh Minott (8); Asts: Jaylen Brown (6) | Pts: Tyrese Maxey (26); Rebs: Kelly Oubre Jr. (9); Asts: Tyrese Maxey (14) |

Xfinity Mobile Arena, Philadelphia, PA
Attendance: 19,746
Referees: Courtney Kirkland, Kevin Cutler, J.T. Orr

NBA League Pass

November 7
7:00 p.m.

Recap

Boston Celtics 110, Orlando Magic 123
Scoring by quarter: 25–38, 26–21, 29–25, 30–39
| Pts: Jaylen Brown (32); Rebs: Jaylen Brown (9); Asts: Derrick White (10) | Pts: Franz Wagner (27); Rebs: Paolo Banchero (9); Asts: Desmond Bane (7) |

Kia Center, Orlando, FL
Attendance: 19,154
Referees: Sean Corbin, Tyler Ford, Jenna Schroeder

NBA League Pass

November 7
7:30 p.m.

Recap

Detroit Pistons 125, Brooklyn Nets 107
Scoring by quarter: 27–29, 33–26, 34–19, 31–33
| Pts: Cade Cunningham (34); Rebs: Jalen Duren (11); Asts: Cade Cunningham (10) | Pts: Michael Porter Jr. (28); Rebs: Nic Claxton (8); Asts: Egor Dëmin (7) |

Barclays Center, Brooklyn, NY
Attendance: 17,548
Referees: Leon Wood, Brent Barnaky, Mitchell Ervin

NBA League Pass

November 14
7:00 p.m.

Recap

Brooklyn Nets 98, Orlando Magic 105
Scoring by quarter: 36–27, 22–27, 24–25, 16–26
| Pts: Michael Porter Jr. (24); Rebs: Michael Porter Jr. (11); Asts: Michael Porter Jr. (7) | Pts: Franz Wagner (25); Rebs: Goga Bitadze (9); Asts: Jalen Suggs (6) |

Kia Center, Orlando, FL
Attendance: 17,902
Referees: James Capers, JB DeRosa, Tyler Ricks

NBA League Pass

November 14
7:30 p.m.

Recap

Philadelphia 76ers 105, Detroit Pistons 114
Scoring by quarter: 27–28, 27–35, 36–25, 15–26
| Pts: Tyrese Maxey (31); Rebs: Andre Drummond (11); Asts: Quentin Grimes (5) | Pts: Javonte Green (21); Rebs: Javonte Green (9); Asts: Daniss Jenkins (8) |

Little Caesars Arena, Detroit, MI
Attendance: 20,062
Referees: Bill Kennedy, Matt Myers, John Butler

NBA League Pass

November 21
7:30 p.m.

Recap

Brooklyn Nets 113, Boston Celtics 105
Scoring by quarter: 22–28, 40–25, 30–24, 21–28
| Pts: Michael Porter Jr. (33); Rebs: Nic Claxton (11); Asts: Nic Claxton (12) | Pts: Jaylen Brown (26); Rebs: Neemias Queta (12); Asts: Brown, Pritchard, Simons, White (4) |

TD Garden, Boston, MA
Attendance: 19,156
Referees: Pat Fraher, Mousa Dagher, Brandon Schwab

NBC

November 25
8:00 p.m.

Recap

Orlando Magic 144, Philadelphia 76ers 103
Scoring by quarter: 35–35, 51–25, 35–23, 23–20
| Pts: Anthony Black (31); Rebs: Goga Bitadze (9); Asts: Jalen Suggs (11) | Pts: Tyrese Maxey (20); Rebs: Andre Drummond (12); Asts: Grimes, Maxey (4) |

Xfinity Mobile Arena, Philadelphia, PA
Attendance: 19,746
Referees: Marc Davis, Jacyn Goble, Biniam Maru

ESPN

November 26
5:00 p.m.

Recap

Detroit Pistons 114, Boston Celtics 117
Scoring by quarter: 30–24, 28–33, 25–29, 31–31
| Pts: Cade Cunningham (42); Rebs: Jalen Duren (16); Asts: Cade Cunningham (5) | Pts: Jaylen Brown (33); Rebs: Jaylen Brown (10); Asts: Jaylen Brown (5) |

TD Garden, Boston, MA
Attendance: 19,156
Referees: Tony Brothers, Mitchell Ervin, Jenna Schroeder

NBA League Pass

November 28
7:30 p.m.

Recap

Philadelphia 76ers 115, Brooklyn Nets 103
Scoring by quarter: 31–23, 32–25, 24–27, 28–28
| Pts: Tyrese Maxey (22); Rebs: Dominick Barlow (10); Asts: Quentin Grimes (9) | Pts: Egor Dëmin (23); Rebs: Egor Dёmin (9); Asts: Terance Mann (6) |

Barclays Center, Brooklyn, NY
Attendance: 17,809
Referees: Mitchell Ervin, Andy Nagy, Jonathan Sterling

NBA League Pass

November 28
7:30 p.m.

Recap

Orlando Magic 112, Detroit Pistons 109
Scoring by quarter: 31–33, 28–25, 30–26, 23–25
| Pts: Desmond Bane (37); Rebs: Wendell Carter Jr. (11); Asts: Anthony Black (4) | Pts: Cade Cunningham (39); Rebs: Cade Cunningham (13); Asts: Cade Cunningham (11) |

Little Caesars Arena, Detroit, MI
Attendance: 20,062
Referees: Derrick Collins, David Guthrie, Eric Dalen

=== East group C ===
| Pos | Team | Pld | W | L | PF | PA | PD | Qualification |
|---|---|---|---|---|---|---|---|---|
| 1 | New York Knicks | 4 | 3 | 1 | 512 | 477 | +35 | Advanced to knockout rounds |
| 2 | Miami Heat | 4 | 3 | 1 | 507 | 458 | +49 | Advanced to knockout rounds |
| 3 | Milwaukee Bucks | 4 | 2 | 2 | 467 | 463 | +4 | |
| 4 | Charlotte Hornets | 4 | 1 | 3 | 461 | 500 | −39 | |
| 5 | Chicago Bulls | 4 | 1 | 3 | 468 | 517 | −49 | |

Source: NBA

Games

Note: Times are Eastern Time (UTC−4 or UTC−5) as listed by the NBA. If the venue is located in a different time zone, the local time is also given.

NBA League Pass

October 31
8:00 p.m. (7:00 p.m. Central)

Recap

New York Knicks 125, Chicago Bulls 135
Scoring by quarter: 27–35, 26–37, 38–28, 34–35
| Pts: Jalen Brunson (29); Rebs: Mitchell Robinson (11); Asts: Jalen Brunson (7) | Pts: Josh Giddey (32); Rebs: Josh Giddey (10); Asts: Ayo Dosunmu (9) |

United Center, Chicago, IL
Attendance: 18,330
Referees: Sean Wright, Matt Kallio, Andy Nagy

NBA League Pass

November 7
8:00 p.m.

Recap

Charlotte Hornets 108, Miami Heat 126
Scoring by quarter: 33–53, 36–19, 19–22, 20–32
| Pts: Kon Knueppel (30); Rebs: Miles Bridges (12); Asts: Bridges, Mann (7) | Pts: Norman Powell (25); Rebs: Jaime Jaquez Jr. (8); Asts: Jaime Jaquez Jr. (9) |

Kaseya Center, Miami, FL
Attendance: 19,600
Referees: James Williams, Matt Myers, Jason Goldenberg

NBA League Pass

November 7
8:00 p.m. (7:00 p.m. Central)

Recap

Chicago Bulls 110, Milwaukee Bucks 126
Scoring by quarter: 25–23, 27–30, 28–32, 30–41
| Pts: Matas Buzelis (20); Rebs: Matas Buzelis (8); Asts: Josh Giddey (14) | Pts: Giannis Antetokounmpo (41); Rebs: Giannis Antetokounmpo (15); Asts: Giannis Antetokounmpo (9) |

Fiserv Forum, Milwaukee, WI
Attendance: 17,839
Referees: Marc Davis, Natalie Sago, JD Ralls

NBA on Prime

November 14
7:00 p.m.

Recap

Miami Heat 132, New York Knicks 140
Scoring by quarter: 35–32, 33–46, 36–32, 28–30
| Pts: Norman Powell (38); Rebs: Kel'el Ware (10); Asts: Davion Mitchell (10) | Pts: Karl-Anthony Towns (39); Rebs: Josh Hart (12); Asts: Josh Hart (10) |

Madison Square Garden, New York, NY
Attendance: 19,812
Referees: Tre Maddox, Kevin Scott, CJ Washington

NBA League Pass

November 14
8:00 p.m. (7:00 p.m. Central)

Recap

Charlotte Hornets 134, Milwaukee Bucks 147 (OT)
Scoring by quarter: 33–34, 36–27, 29–42, 31–26, Overtime: 5–18
| Pts: Bridges, Knueppel (32); Rebs: Moussa Diabaté (11); Asts: LaMelo Ball (10) | Pts: Kyle Kuzma (29); Rebs: Kyle Kuzma (10); Asts: Giannis Antetokounmpo (18) |

Fiserv Forum, Milwaukee, WI
Attendance: 17,341
Referees: Michael Smith, James Williams, Jacyn Goble

NBA League Pass

November 21
8:00 p.m. (7:00 p.m. Central)

Recap

Miami Heat 143, Chicago Bulls 107
Scoring by quarter: 36–32, 34–20, 32–23, 41–32
| Pts: Kel'el Ware (20); Rebs: Kel'el Ware (14); Asts: Jaquez Jr., Larsson (7) | Pts: Ayo Dosunmu (23); Rebs: Josh Giddey (11); Asts: Josh Giddey (9) |

United Center, Chicago, IL
Attendance: 21,313
Referees: Tony Brothers, Che Flores, Nate Green

NBA League Pass

November 26
7:00 p.m.

Recap

New York Knicks 129, Charlotte Hornets 101
Scoring by quarter: 37–31, 35–16, 26–28, 31–26
| Pts: Jalen Brunson (33); Rebs: Karl-Anthony Towns (10); Asts: Josh Hart (7) | Pts: Brandon Miller (18); Rebs: Ball, Kalkbrenner (6); Asts: LaMelo Ball (4) |

Spectrum Center, Charlotte, NC
Attendance: 19,588
Referees: David Guthrie, Dannica Baroody, Danielle Scott

NBA League Pass

November 26
7:30 p.m.

Recap

Milwaukee Bucks 103, Miami Heat 106
Scoring by quarter: 27–29, 20–24, 30–28, 26–25
| Pts: Ryan Rollins (26); Rebs: Kyle Kuzma (12); Asts: A. J. Green (8) | Pts: Tyler Herro (29); Rebs: Bam Adebayo (11); Asts: Davion Mitchell (9) |

Kaseya Center, Miami, FL
Attendance: 19,600
Referees: Kevin Scott, Jason Goldenberg, Pat O'Connell

NBA League Pass

November 28
7:30 p.m.

Recap

Chicago Bulls 116, Charlotte Hornets 123
Scoring by quarter: 29–32, 33–35, 32–26, 22–30
| Pts: Giddey, White (25); Rebs: Nikola Vučević (14); Asts: Josh Giddey (9) | Pts: Brandon Miller (27); Rebs: Bridges, Diabaté (8); Asts: LaMelo Ball (8) |

Spectrum Center, Charlotte, NC
Attendance: 19,453
Referees: JB DeRosa, Kevin Scott, Jenna Schroder

NBA on Prime

November 28
7:30 p.m.

Recap

Milwaukee Bucks 109, New York Knicks 118
Scoring by quarter: 37–33, 25–28, 26–31, 21–26
| Pts: Giannis Antetokounmpo (30); Rebs: Giannis Antetokounmpo (15); Asts: Giannis Antetokounmpo (8) | Pts: Jalen Brunson (37); Rebs: Josh Hart (15); Asts: Josh Hart (7) |

Madison Square Garden, New York, NY
Attendance: 19,812
Referees: Michael Smith, Curtis Blair, Brent Barnaky

=== West group A ===
| Pos | Team | Pld | W | L | PF | PA | PD | Qualification |
|---|---|---|---|---|---|---|---|---|
| 1 | Oklahoma City Thunder | 4 | 4 | 0 | 512 | 437 | +75 | Advanced to knockout rounds |
| 2 | Phoenix Suns | 4 | 3 | 1 | 463 | 432 | +31 | Advanced to knockout rounds |
| 3 | Minnesota Timberwolves | 4 | 2 | 2 | 479 | 434 | +45 | |
| 4 | Utah Jazz | 4 | 1 | 3 | 433 | 518 | −85 | |
| 5 | Sacramento Kings | 4 | 0 | 4 | 430 | 496 | −66 | |

Source: NBA

Games

Note: Times are Eastern Time (UTC−4 or UTC−5) as listed by the NBA. If the venue is located in a different time zone, the local time is also given.

NBA League Pass

October 31
10:00 p.m. (8:00 p.m. Mountain)

Recap

Utah Jazz 96, Phoenix Suns 118
Scoring by quarter: 17–37, 23–17, 27–29, 29–35
| Pts: Lauri Markkanen (33); Rebs: Walker Kessler (13); Asts: Keyonte George (9) | Pts: Devin Booker (36); Rebs: Ryan Dunn (10); Asts: Devin Booker (9) |

Mortgage Matchup Center, Phoenix, AZ
Attendance: 17,071
Referees: Tony Brothers, Leon Wood, John Butler

NBA League Pass

November 7
8:00 p.m. (7:00 p.m. Central)

Recap

Utah Jazz 97, Minnesota Timberwolves 137
Scoring by quarter: 15–43, 30–36, 22–25, 30–33
| Pts: Keyonte George (18); Rebs: Kyle Filipowski (10); Asts: Anderson, Nurkić (4) | Pts: Anthony Edwards (37); Rebs: Julius Randle (10); Asts: Julius Randle (12) |

Target Center, Minneapolis, MN
Attendance: 17,924
Referees: Brett Nansel, Dedric Taylor, Jacyn Goble

NBA League Pass

November 7
10:00 p.m. (7:00 p.m. Pacific)

Recap

Oklahoma City Thunder 132, Sacramento Kings 101
Scoring by quarter: 30–32, 40–24, 28–27, 34–18
| Pts: Isaiah Hartenstein (33); Rebs: Isaiah Hartenstein (19); Asts: Ajay Mitchell (10) | Pts: Russell Westbrook (24); Rebs: Maxime Raynaud (10); Asts: Russell Westbrook (9) |

Golden One Center, Sacramento, CA
Attendance: 15,767
Referees: Courtney Kirkland, Marat Kogut, Andy Nagy

NBA League Pass

November 14
8:00 p.m. (7:00 p.m. Central)

Recap

Sacramento Kings 110, Minnesota Timberwolves 124
Scoring by quarter: 30–35, 31–26, 30–31, 19–32
| Pts: Domantas Sabonis (31); Rebs: Domantas Sabonis (9); Asts: Russell Westbrook (13) | Pts: Anthony Edwards (26); Rebs: Naz Reid (12); Asts: DiVincenzo, Randle (5) |

Target Center, Minneapolis, MN
Attendance: 16,962
Referees: John Goble, Eric Dalen, Suyash Mehta

NBA League Pass

November 21
9:00 p.m. (7:00 p.m. Mountain)

Recap

Minnesota Timberwolves 113, Phoenix Suns 114
Scoring by quarter: 24–32, 25–30, 33–19, 31–33
| Pts: Anthony Edwards (41); Rebs: Rudy Gobert (12); Asts: Edwards, Gobert (4) | Pts: Dillon Brooks (22); Rebs: Mark Williams (8); Asts: Devin Booker (10) |

Mortgage Matchup Center, Phoenix, AZ
Attendance: 17,071
Referees: Eric Dalen, Kevin Scott, Robert Hussey

NBA League Pass

November 21
10:00 p.m. (8:00 p.m. Mountain)

Recap

Oklahoma City Thunder 144, Utah Jazz 112
Scoring by quarter: 30–44, 37–24, 43–20, 34–24
| Pts: Shai Gilgeous-Alexander (31); Rebs: Hartenstein, Williams (6); Asts: Shai Gilgeous-Alexander (8) | Pts: Keyonte George (20); Rebs: Jusuf Nurkić (10); Asts: Keyonte George (8) |

Delta Center, Salt Lake City, UT
Attendance: 18,186
Referees: Sean Wright, Matt Myers, John Butler

ESPN

November 26
7:30 p.m. (6:30 p.m. Central)

Recap

Minnesota Timberwolves 105, Oklahoma City Thunder 113
Scoring by quarter: 17–24, 22–25, 32–29, 34–35
| Pts: Anthony Edwards (31); Rebs: Rudy Gobert (12); Asts: Anthony Edwards (5) | Pts: Shai Gilgeous-Alexander (40); Rebs: Chet Holmgren (9); Asts: Shai Gilgeous-Alexander (6) |

Paycom Center Oklahoma City, OK
Attendance: 18,203
Referees: Josh Tiven, Dedric Taylor, Jonathan Sterling

NBA League Pass

November 26
10:00 p.m. (7:00 p.m. Pacific)

Recap

Phoenix Suns 112, Sacramento Kings 100
Scoring by quarter: 41–16, 26–29, 16–28, 29–27
| Pts: Gillespie, Williams (21); Rebs: Mark Williams (16); Asts: Collin Gillespie (9) | Pts: Murray, Westbrook (19); Rebs: Drew Eubanks (9); Asts: Achiuwa, DeRozan, Murray, Westbrook (3) |

Golden 1 Center, Sacramento, CA
Attendance: 17,961
Referees: Sean Corbin, Bill Kennedy, Matt Kallio

NBA League Pass

November 28
9:30 p.m. (8:30 p.m. Central)

Recap

Phoenix Suns 119, Oklahoma City Thunder 123
Scoring by quarter: 25–25, 27–31, 30–38, 37–29
| Pts: Collin Gillespie (24); Rebs: Mark Williams (14); Asts: Devin Booker (6) | Pts: Shai Gilgeous-Alexander (37); Rebs: Chet Holmgren (8); Asts: Gilgeous-Alexander, Williams (8) |

Paycom Center, Oklahoma City, OK
Attendance: 18,203
Referees: James Capers, Nate Green, Evan Scott

NBA League Pass

November 28
9:30 p.m. (7:30 p.m. Mountain)

Recap

Sacramento Kings 119, Utah Jazz 128
Scoring by quarter: 27–30, 24–32, 22–28, 46–38
| Pts: Zach LaVine (34); Rebs: Russell Westbrook (12); Asts: Russell Westbrook (14) | Pts: Keyonte George (31); Rebs: Jusuf Nurkić (11); Asts: Jusuf Nurkić (9) |

Delta Center, Salt Lake City, UT
Attendance: 18,186
Referees: Pat Fraher, Josh Tiven, Jenna Reneau

=== West group B ===
| Pos | Team | Pld | W | L | PF | PA | PD | Qualification |
|---|---|---|---|---|---|---|---|---|
| 1 | Los Angeles Lakers | 4 | 4 | 0 | 499 | 453 | +46 | Advanced to knockout rounds |
| 2 | Memphis Grizzlies | 4 | 3 | 1 | 464 | 450 | +14 | |
| 3 | Los Angeles Clippers | 4 | 2 | 2 | 465 | 485 | −20 | |
| 4 | Dallas Mavericks | 4 | 1 | 3 | 455 | 476 | −21 | |
| 5 | New Orleans Pelicans | 4 | 0 | 4 | 465 | 484 | −19 | |

Source: NBA

Games

Note: Times are Eastern Time (UTC−4 or UTC−5) as listed by the NBA. If the venue is located in a different time zone, the local time is also given.

NBA on Prime

October 31
9:30 p.m. (8:30 p.m. Central)

Recap

Los Angeles Lakers 117, Memphis Grizzlies 112
Scoring by quarter: 31–27, 24–42, 34–22, 28–21
| Pts: Luka Dončić (44); Rebs: Luka Dončić (11); Asts: Luka Dončić (6) | Pts: Landale, Wells (16); Rebs: Aldama, Coward (10); Asts: Ja Morant (7) |

FedExForum, Memphis, TN
Attendance: 16,122
Referees: Scott Foster, Jacyn Goble, Biniam Maru

NBA League Pass

October 31
10:30 p.m. (7:30 p.m. Pacific)

Recap

New Orleans Pelicans 124, Los Angeles Clippers 126
Scoring by quarter: 28–26, 31–41, 25–27, 40–32
| Pts: Jordan Poole (30); Rebs: Yves Missi (9); Asts: Jeremiah Fears (8) | Pts: Kawhi Leonard (34); Rebs: Ivica Zubac (11); Asts: James Harden (14) |

Intuit Dome, Los Angeles, CA
Attendance: 16,083
Referees: John Goble, Jason Goldenberg, Jenna Schroeder

NBA League Pass

November 7
8:00 p.m. (7:00 p.m. Central)

Recap

Dallas Mavericks 104, Memphis Grizzlies 118
Scoring by quarter: 24–34, 27–40, 29–28, 24–16
| Pts: Max Christie (18); Rebs: Moussa Cissé (8); Asts: D'Angelo Russell (5) | Pts: Coward, Morant (21); Rebs: Cedric Coward (9); Asts: Ja Morant (13) |

FedExForum, Memphis, TN
Attendance: 15,028
Referees: Sean Wright, Kevin Cutler, Evan Scott

NBA League Pass

November 14
8:00 p.m. (7:00 p.m. Central)

Recap

Los Angeles Lakers 118, New Orleans Pelicans 104
Scoring by quarter: 35–25, 30–27, 30–25, 23–27
| Pts: Austin Reaves (31); Rebs: Deandre Ayton (16); Asts: Luka Dončić (12) | Pts: Trey Murphy III (35); Rebs: Derik Queen (10); Asts: Saddiq Bey (7) |

Smoothie King Center, New Orleans, LA
Attendance: 18,102
Referees: Mitchell Ervin, Andy Nagy, Jenna Schroeder

NBA League Pass

November 14
8:30 p.m. (7:30 p.m. Central)

Recap

Los Angeles Clippers 133, Dallas Mavericks 127 (2OT)
Scoring by quarter: 34–31, 28–24, 31–31, 21–28, Overtime: 9–9, 10–4
| Pts: James Harden (41); Rebs: James Harden (14); Asts: James Harden (11) | Pts: Marshall, Russell (28); Rebs: Gafford, Marshall (8); Asts: Russell, Williams (5) |

American Airlines Center, Dallas, TX
Attendance: 18,624
Referees: Courtney Kirkland, Nick Buchert, Pat O'Connell

NBA League Pass

November 21
8:30 p.m. (7:30 p.m. Central)

Recap

New Orleans Pelicans 115, Dallas Mavericks 118
Scoring by quarter: 34–25, 29–24, 22–36, 30–33
| Pts: Trey Murphy III (25); Rebs: Herbert Jones (9); Asts: Derik Queen (11) | Pts: Cooper Flagg (29); Rebs: P. J. Washington (9); Asts: Brandon Williams (12) |

American Airlines Center, Dallas, TX
Attendance: 18,506
Referees: Bill Kennedy, Jason Goldenberg, Dannica Baroody

NBC

November 25
11:00 p.m. (8:00 p.m. Pacific)

Recap

Los Angeles Clippers 118, Los Angeles Lakers 135
Scoring by quarter: 38–37, 28–32, 27–29, 25–37
| Pts: James Harden (29); Rebs: Ivica Zubac (10); Asts: James Harden (9) | Pts: Luka Dončić (43); Rebs: Dončić, Reaves (9); Asts: Luka Dončić (13) |

Crypto.com Arena, Los Angeles, CA
Attendance: 18,997
Referees: JB DeRosa, James Williams, John Conley

NBA League Pass

November 26
8:00 p.m. (7:00 p.m. Central)

Recap

Memphis Grizzlies 133, New Orleans Pelicans 128 (OT)
Scoring by quarter: 25–39, 28–29, 39–32, 30–22, Overtime: 11–6
| Pts: Jaren Jackson Jr. (27); Rebs: Zach Edey (15); Asts: Vince Williams Jr. (17) | Pts: Jose Alvarado (24); Rebs: Saddiq Bey (10); Asts: Derik Queen (9) |

Smoothie King Center, New Orleans, LA
Attendance: 17,333
Referees: Karl Lane, Gediminas Petraitis, Suyash Mehta

NBA on Prime

November 28
10:00 p.m. (7:00 p.m. Pacific)

Recap

Dallas Mavericks 119, Los Angeles Lakers 129
Scoring by quarter: 22–28, 40–32, 32–38, 25–31
| Pts: P. J. Washington (22); Rebs: P. J. Washington (9); Asts: Cooper Flagg (11) | Pts: Austin Reaves (38); Rebs: Ayton, Reaves (8); Asts: Luka Dončić (11) |

Crypto.com Arena Los Angeles, CA
Attendance: 18,997
Referees: Scott Foster, Justin Van Duyne, Mousa Dagher

NBA League Pass

November 28
10:00 p.m. (7:00 p.m. Pacific)

Recap

Memphis Grizzlies 112, Los Angeles Clippers 107
Scoring by quarter: 24–35, 26–28, 28–18, 34–26
| Pts: Jaren Jackson Jr. (24); Rebs: Zach Edey (19); Asts: Aldama, Williams Jr. (5) | Pts: Kawhi Leonard (39); Rebs: Ivica Zubac (12); Asts: James Harden (11) |

Intuit Dome Los Angeles, CA
Attendance: 17,927
Referees: Sean Corbin, Brett Nansel, Ray Acosta

=== West group C ===
| Pos | Team | Pld | W | L | PF | PA | PD | Qualification |
|---|---|---|---|---|---|---|---|---|
| 1 | San Antonio Spurs | 4 | 3 | 1 | 483 | 457 | +26 | Advanced to knockout rounds |
| 2 | Denver Nuggets | 4 | 2 | 2 | 484 | 461 | +23 | |
| 3 | Houston Rockets | 4 | 2 | 2 | 463 | 449 | +14 | |
| 4 | Portland Trail Blazers | 4 | 2 | 2 | 454 | 485 | −31 | |
| 5 | Golden State Warriors | 4 | 1 | 3 | 436 | 468 | −32 | |

Source: NBA

Games

Note: Times are Eastern Time (UTC−4 or UTC−5) as listed by the NBA. If the venue is located in a different time zone, the local time is also given.

NBA League Pass

October 31
10:00 p.m. (7:00 p.m. Pacific)

Recap

Denver Nuggets 107, Portland Trail Blazers 109
Scoring by quarter: 26-18, 31–35, 24–18, 26–38
| Pts: Jamal Murray (22); Rebs: Nikola Jokić (14); Asts: Nikola Jokić (9) | Pts: Deni Avdija (23); Rebs: Donovan Clingan (15); Asts: Jrue Holiday (13) |

Moda Center, Portland, OR
Attendance: 16,382
Referees: Zach Zarba, Mousa Dagher, Simone Jelks

NBA on Prime

November 7
7:30 p.m. (6:30 p.m. Central)

Recap

Houston Rockets 110, San Antonio Spurs 121
Scoring by quarter: 25-23, 25-28, 32-35, 28-35
| Pts: Alperen Şengün (25); Rebs: Alperen Şengün (9); Asts: Alperen Şengün (8) | Pts: Harrison Barnes (24); Rebs: Victor Wembanyama (8); Asts: Stephon Castle (13) |

Frost Bank Center, San Antonio, TX
Attendance: 19,035
Referees: Tony Brothers, Justin Van Duyne, Brandon Adair

NBA on Prime

November 7
10:00 p.m. (8:00 p.m. Mountain)

Recap

Golden State Warriors 104, Denver Nuggets 129
Scoring by quarter: 21–32, 28–34, 28–33, 27–UTA, 30
| Pts: Draymond Green (17); Rebs: Jackson-Davis, Kuminga (7); Asts: Green, Pat Spencer (5) | Pts: Nikola Jokić (26); Rebs: Nikola Jokić (9); Asts: Nikola Jokić (9) |

Ball Arena, Denver, CO
Attendance: 19,969
Referees: James Capers, Gediminas Petraitis, Brandon Schwab

NBA League Pass

November 14
8:00 p.m. (7:00 p.m. Central)

Recap

Portland Trail Blazers 116, Houston Rockets 140
Scoring by quarter: 32–41, 28–28, 31–36, 25–35
| Pts: Deni Avdija (22); Rebs: Deni Avdija (10); Asts: Jrue Holiday (6) | Pts: Kevin Durant (30); Rebs: Steven Adams (11); Asts: Alperen Sengun (9) |

Toyota Center, Houston, TX
Attendance: 18,055
Referees: Tony Brothers, Sean Corbin, Evan Scott

NBA on Prime

November 14
9:30 p.m. (8:30 p.m. Central)

Recap

Golden State Warriors 109, San Antonio Spurs 108
Scoring by quarter: 18–20, 29–25, 30–34, 32–29
| Pts: Stephen Curry (49); Rebs: Butler III, Green (8); Asts: Draymond Green (8) | Pts: Victor Wembanyama (26); Rebs: Victor Wembanyama (12); Asts: De'Aaron Fox (10) |

Frost Bank Center, San Antonio, TX
Attendance: 19,059
Referees: Marc Davis, Brian Forte, Brandon Schwab

NBA on Prime

November 21
9:30 p.m. (8:30 p.m. Central)

Recap

Denver Nuggets 112, Houston Rockets 109
Scoring by quarter: 25–12, 21–37, 34–29, 32–31
| Pts: Nikola Jokić (34); Rebs: Jokić, Watson (10); Asts: Jamal Murray (10) | Pts: Reed Sheppard (27); Rebs: Jabari Smith Jr. (11); Asts: Alperen Şengün (6) |

Toyota Center, Houston, TX
Attendance: 18,108
Referees: Courtney Kirkland, J.T. Orr, Dedric Taylor

NBA League Pass

November 21
10:00 p.m. (7:00 p.m. Pacific)

Recap

Portland Trail Blazers 127, Golden State Warriors 123
Scoring by quarter: 35–28, 30–44, 29–25, 33–26
| Pts: Avdija, Love (26); Rebs: Robert Williams III (11); Asts: Deni Avdija (14) | Pts: Stephen Curry (38); Rebs: Jimmy Butler III (8); Asts: Draymond Green (8) |

Chase Center, San Francisco, CA
Referees: JB DeRosa, Kevin Cutler, CJ Washington

ESPN

November 26
10:00 p.m. (7:00 p.m. Pacific)

Recap

Houston Rockets 104, Golden State Warriors 100
Scoring by quarter: 22–25, 25–34, 27–17, 30–24
| Pts: Reed Sheppard (31); Rebs: Amen Thompson (14); Asts: Alperen Şengün (6) | Pts: Jimmy Butler III (21); Rebs: Draymond Green (9); Asts: Draymond Green (8) |

Chase Center, San Francisco, CA
Attendance: 18,064
Referees: Sean Wright, Brandon Adair, Mousa Dagher

NBA League Pass

November 26
10:00 p.m. (7:00 p.m. Pacific)

Recap

San Antonio Spurs 115, Portland Trail Blazers 102
Scoring by quarter: 29–30, 27–24, 35–32, 24–16
| Pts: De'Aaron Fox (37); Rebs: Julian Champagnie (11); Asts: De'Aaron Fox (8) | Pts: Deni Avdija (37); Rebs: Donovan Clingan (11); Asts: Deni Avdija (8) |

Moda Center, Portland, OR
Attendance: 19,335
Referees: John Goble, Scott Twardoski, Nate Green

NBA League Pass

November 28
9:30 p.m. (7:30 p.m. Mountain)

Recap

San Antonio Spurs 139, Denver Nuggets 136
Scoring by quarter: 41–33, 18–41, 44–30, 36–32
| Pts: Devin Vassell (35); Rebs: Julian Champagnie (10); Asts: De'Aaron Fox (12) | Pts: Jamal Murray (37); Rebs: Nikola Jokić (9); Asts: Nikola Jokić (10) |

Ball Arena, Denver, CO
Attendance: 19,936
Referees: Marat Kogut, Kevin Cutler, Brandon Adair

== Ranking of wild card teams ==
=== Eastern Conference ===
| Pos | Team | Pld | W | L | PF | PA | PD | Qualification |
|---|---|---|---|---|---|---|---|---|
| 1 | Miami Heat | 4 | 3 | 1 | 507 | 458 | +49 | Advanced to knockout rounds |
| 2 | Atlanta Hawks | 4 | 2 | 2 | 468 | 472 | −4 | |
| 3 | Boston Celtics | 4 | 2 | 2 | 441 | 458 | −17 | |

Source: NBA

=== Western Conference ===
| Pos | Team | Pld | W | L | PF | PA | PD | Qualification |
|---|---|---|---|---|---|---|---|---|
| 1 | Phoenix Suns | 4 | 3 | 1 | 463 | 432 | +31 | Advanced to knockout rounds |
| 2 | Memphis Grizzlies | 4 | 3 | 1 | 464 | 450 | +14 | |
| 3 | Denver Nuggets | 4 | 2 | 2 | 484 | 461 | +23 | |

Source: NBA

== Knockout rounds ==
=== Qualified teams ===
Eastern Conference

| Pos | Team | Pld | W | L | PF | PA | PD |
|---|---|---|---|---|---|---|---|
| 1 | Orlando Magic | 4 | 4 | 0 | 484 | 420 | +64 |
| 2 | Toronto Raptors | 4 | 4 | 0 | 458 | 403 | +55 |
| 3 | New York Knicks | 4 | 3 | 1 | 512 | 477 | +35 |
| 4 | Miami Heat | 4 | 3 | 1 | 507 | 458 | +49 |

Source: NBA
Rules for classification: Tiebreakers

Western Conference

| Pos | Team | Pld | W | L | PF | PA | PD |
|---|---|---|---|---|---|---|---|
| 1 | Oklahoma City Thunder | 4 | 4 | 0 | 512 | 437 | +75 |
| 2 | Los Angeles Lakers | 4 | 4 | 0 | 499 | 453 | +46 |
| 3 | San Antonio Spurs | 4 | 3 | 1 | 483 | 457 | +26 |
| 4 | Phoenix Suns | 4 | 3 | 1 | 463 | 432 | +31 |

Source: NBA
Rules for classification: Tiebreakers

=== Bracket ===
Quarterfinals
December 9 – Orlando, FL
1 Orlando | 117
4 Miami | 108
December 9 – Toronto, ON
2 Toronto | 101
3 New York | 117
December 10 – Oklahoma City, OK
1 Oklahoma City | 138
4 Phoenix | 89
December 10 – Los Angeles, CA
2 LA Lakers | 119
3 San Antonio | 132

Semifinals
December 13 – Las Vegas, NV
1 Orlando | 120
3 New York | 132
December 13 – Las Vegas, NV
1 Oklahoma City | 109
3 San Antonio | 111

Championship game
December 16 – Las Vegas, NV
3 New York | 124
3 San Antonio | 113

=== Quarterfinals ===
Note: Times are Eastern Standard Time (UTC−5) as listed by the NBA. If the venue is located in a different time zone, the local time is also given.

Prime

December 9
6:00 p.m.

Recap

Miami Heat 108, Orlando Magic 117
Scoring by quarter: 30–17, 27–39, 26–33, 25–28
| Pts: Norman Powell (21); Rebs: Bam Adebayo (8); Asts: Davion Mitchell (9) | Pts: Desmond Bane (37); Rebs: Wendell Carter Jr. (10); Asts: Anthony Black (7) |

Kia Center, Orlando, FL
Attendance: 18,605
Referees: Courtney Kirkland, Tre Maddox, Robert Hussey

Prime,
SN

December 9
8:30 p.m.

Recap

New York Knicks 117, Toronto Raptors 101
Scoring by quarter: 35–39, 34–13, 25–27, 23–22
| Pts: Jalen Brunson (35); Rebs: Karl-Anthony Towns (16); Asts: Bridges, Brunson, Hart, Robinson (4) | Pts: Brandon Ingram (31); Rebs: Jakob Pöltl (9); Asts: Jamal Shead (8) |

Scotiabank Arena, Toronto, ON
Attendance: 17,801
Referees: Josh Tiven, Brandon Adair, Jacyn Goble

Prime

December 10
7:30 p.m.
(6:30 p.m. Central)

Recap

Phoenix Suns 89, Oklahoma City Thunder 138
Scoring by quarter: 23–38, 25–36, 24–36, 17–28
| Pts: Dillon Brooks (16); Rebs: Ighodaro, Richards, Williams (5); Asts: Jamaree Bouyea (5) | Pts: Shai Gilgeous-Alexander (28); Rebs: Chet Holmgren (8); Asts: Shai Gilgeous-Alexander (8) |

Paycom Center, Oklahoma City, OK
Attendance: 18,203
Referees: James Williams, Ray Acosta, Danielle Scott

Prime

December 10
10:00 p.m.
(7:00 p.m. Pacific)

Recap

San Antonio Spurs 132, Los Angeles Lakers 119
Scoring by quarter: 39–30, 31–28, 34–29, 28–32
| Pts: Stephon Castle (30); Rebs: Stephon Castle (10); Asts: Stephon Castle (6) | Pts: Luka Dončić (35); Rebs: LeBron James (15); Asts: Dončić, James (8) |

Crypto.com Arena, Los Angeles, CA
Attendance: 18,684
Referees: John Goble, John Butler, Brandon Schwab

=== Semifinals ===
Prime

December 13
5:30 PM (2:30 PM Pacific)

Recap

New York Knicks 132, Orlando Magic 120
Scoring by quarter: 33–36, 38–28, 29–28, 32–28
| Pts: Jalen Brunson (40); Rebs: Mitchell Robinson (9); Asts: Jalen Brunson (8) | Pts: Jalen Suggs (26); Rebs: Banchero, Black (8); Asts: Bane, Suggs (7) |

T-Mobile Arena, Las Vegas, NV
Attendance: 16,697
Referees: Kevin Scott, Sean Corbin, Andy Nagy

Prime

December 13
9:00 PM (6:00 PM Pacific)

Recap

San Antonio Spurs 111, Oklahoma City Thunder 109
Scoring by quarter: 20–31, 26–18, 32–28, 33–32
| Pts: Devin Vassell (23); Rebs: Victor Wembanyama (9); Asts: Harrison Barnes (5) | Pts: Shai Gilgeous-Alexander (29); Rebs: Caruso, Hartenstein (8); Asts: Shai Gilgeous-Alexander (5) |

T-Mobile Arena, Las Vegas, NV
Attendance: 18,519
Referees: Sean Wright, Brian Forte, Jason Goldenberg

=== Championship game ===
Prime

December 16
8:30 PM (5:30 PM Pacific)

Recap

New York Knicks 124, San Antonio Spurs 113
Scoring by quarter: 28–30, 31–31, 30–33, 35–19
| Pts: OG Anunoby (28); Rebs: Mitchell Robinson (15); Asts: Jalen Brunson (8) | Pts: Dylan Harper (21); Rebs: Castle, Harper (7); Asts: Stephon Castle (12) |

T-Mobile Arena, Las Vegas, NV
Attendance: 18,609
Referees: Marc Davis, Brent Barnaky, Nate Green

| Starters: | | | Pts | Reb | Ast |
|---|---|---|---|---|---|
| G | 11 | Jalen Brunson | 25 | 4 | 8 |
| G | 25 | Mikal Bridges | 11 | 5 | 5 |
| F | 3 | Josh Hart | 11 | 8 | 3 |
| F | 8 | OG Anunoby | 28 | 9 | 3 |
| C | 32 | Karl-Anthony Towns | 16 | 11 | 1 |
| Reserves: | | | | | |
| G | 00 | Jordan Clarkson | 15 | 2 | 0 |
| F | 23 | Mitchell Robinson | 4 | 15 | 2 |
| G | 13 | Tyler Kolek | 14 | 5 | 5 |
| C | 55 | Ariel Hukporti | 0 | 0 | 0 |
| F | 4 | Pacôme Dadiet | DNP | | |
| F | 51 | Mohamed Diawara | DNP | | |
| G | 20 | Tosan Evbuomwan | DNP | | |
| C | 50 | Trey Jemison | DNP | | |
| G | 9 | Kevin McCullar Jr. | DNP | | |
| F | 28 | Guerschon Yabusele | DNP | | |
Head coach:
Mike Brown

| New York | San Antonio |

| New York | Statistics | San Antonio |
|---|---|---|
| 49/105 (46.7%) | Field goals | 41/99 (41.4%) |
| 15/40 (37.5%) | 3-point field goals | 14/39 (35.9%) |
| 11/15 (73.3%) | Free throws | 17/22 (77.3%) |
| 23 | Offensive rebounds | 18 |
| 36 | Defensive rebounds | 24 |
| 59 | Total rebounds | 42 |
| 27 | Assists | 29 |
| 10 | Turnovers | 8 |
| 7 | Steals | 4 |
| 6 | Blocks | 5 |
| 20 | Fouls | 13 |
| 56 | Points in the paint | 44 |
| 13 | Fast break points | 10 |
| 12 | Biggest lead | 11 |
| 33 | Bench points | 45 |
| | Points off turnovers | |

| Starters: | | | Pts | Reb | Ast |
|---|---|---|---|---|---|
| G | 4 | De'Aaron Fox | 16 | 2 | 9 |
| G | 5 | Stephon Castle | 15 | 7 | 12 |
| F | 24 | Devin Vassell | 12 | 5 | 3 |
| F | 40 | Harrison Barnes | 11 | 3 | 2 |
| C | 7 | Luke Kornet | 14 | 6 | 1 |
| Reserves: | | | | | |
| C | 1 | Victor Wembanyama | 18 | 6 | 1 |
| G | 2 | Dylan Harper | 21 | 7 | 0 |
| F | 30 | Julian Champagnie | 3 | 2 | 1 |
| G/F | 3 | Keldon Johnson | 3 | 4 | 0 |
| C | 18 | Bismack Biyombo | DNP | | |
| F | 11 | Carter Bryant | DNP | | |
| G | 0 | Jordan McLaughlin | DNP | | |
| F/C | 8 | Kelly Olynyk | DNP | | |
| F | 10 | Jeremy Sochan | DNP | | |
| F | 43 | Lindy Waters III | DNP | | |
Head coach:
Mitch Johnson

== Awards and aftermath ==
The Knicks won their first NBA Cup title, and Jalen Brunson was awarded the Most Valuable Player (MVP) award for the tournament after the championship game on December 16. Each player on the Knicks roster received $530,000 in prize money, while Spurs players received $212,000 each.

Both teams would face each other again in the 2026 NBA Finals, after the Knicks swept the Cleveland Cavaliers in the Eastern Finals, and the Spurs defeated the defending champion Oklahoma City Thunder in seven games in the Western Finals. This marks the first time both finalists of the NBA Cup reached the NBA Finals in the same season. The Knicks would go on to beat the Spurs in the Finals in five games.

In contrast with the past two Cup champions, the Knicks initially decided not to raise a championship banner to commemorate their Cup victory. The Knicks ultimately raised their 2025 NBA Cup banner during their banner raising ceremony on the opening night of the 2026–27 regular season.

On December 18, the NBA announced the All-Tournament Team:

All-NBA Cup Tournament Team
| Pos. | Player | Team |
|---|---|---|
| G | Jalen Brunson (MVP) | New York Knicks |
| G | Luka Dončić | Los Angeles Lakers |
| G | De'Aaron Fox | San Antonio Spurs |
| G | Shai Gilgeous-Alexander | Oklahoma City Thunder |
| C | Karl-Anthony Towns | New York Knicks |

== Media coverage ==
With games primarily on Friday evenings, Prime Video aired the majority of group play games (two games each night). Two Tuesday night games aired on NBC, NBCSN and Peacock, while three Wednesday night games aired on ESPN. All knockout round games, including the final, aired on Prime Video.
