= Noah Clowney =

American basketball player (born 2004)

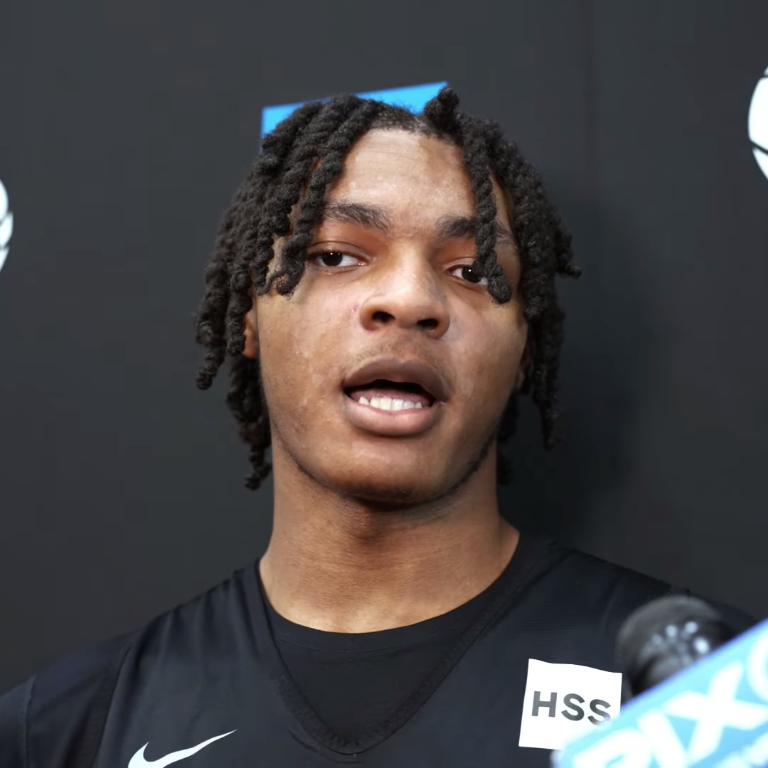
- Clowney with the Brooklyn Nets in 2024

No. 21 – Brooklyn Nets
- Position: Power forward / center
- League: NBA

Personal information
- Born: July 14, 2004 (age 22) Spartanburg, South Carolina, U.S.
- Listed height: 6 ft 10 in (2.08 m)
- Listed weight: 240 lb (109 kg)

Career information
- High school: Dorman (Roebuck, South Carolina)
- College: Alabama (2022–2023)
- NBA draft: 2023: 1st round, 21st overall pick
- Drafted by: Brooklyn Nets
- Playing career: 2023–present

Career history
- 2023–present: Brooklyn Nets
- 2023–2024: →Long Island Nets
- Stats at NBA.com
- Stats at Basketball Reference

Noah Clowney (born July 14, 2004) is an American professional basketball player for the Brooklyn Nets of the National Basketball Association (NBA). He played college basketball for the Alabama Crimson Tide.

== Early life and high school career ==
Clowney grew up in Spartanburg, South Carolina and attended Dorman High School. As a junior, he averaged 9.6 points, 7.9 rebounds, and 1.4 blocks per game over 26 games. Clowney averaged 17.5 points, 9.7 rebounds, and 1.7 blocks per game during his senior season.

Clowney was rated a four-star recruit and committed to playing college basketball for Alabama over offers from Virginia Tech, Florida, and Indiana.

== College career ==
During the summer before his freshman season at Alabama, Clowney took part in the Crimson Tide's European tour and averaged 12.3 points and 7.7 rebounds per game. In a game against the Chinese national team, he scored 11 points and grabbed 10 rebounds. Clowney entered his freshman season as Alabama's starting power forward. He was named the Southeastern Conference (SEC) Freshman of the Week for the first two weeks of December. Following the end of the season, Clowney entered the 2023 NBA draft.

== Professional career ==
=== Brooklyn Nets (2023–present) ===
==== 2023–24 season ====
The Brooklyn Nets selected Clowney with the 21st overall pick in the 2023 NBA draft. The Nets assigned Clowney to their NBA G League affiliate, the Long Island Nets, on October 30, 2023. His first G League action came on November 10, 2023, where he started in their Showcase Cup opener recording game-highs of 12 rebounds and 4 blocks, along with 12 points, in a 123–120 victory over Raptors 905, despite fouling out in just 31 minutes. He played in 15 games, all starts, during the Long Island Nets' 9-7 Showcase Cup campaign, averaging 13.1 points on 56.3% shooting, 8.5 rebounds, and 1.9 blocks per game.

Clowney would be recalled to the Nets and assigned back to Long Island numerous times throughout his first year. He got his first NBA action on November 25, 2023, grabbing one rebound in 3 minutes of play in a 112–97 win against the Miami Heat. On December 27, he checked in for his second NBA game, promptly scoring his first NBA points, 2 of the 14 he would put up in 24 minutes of action during a 124–144 loss to the Milwaukee Bucks. For the next couple months he would be recalled by Brooklyn and play in NBA games intermittently, still spending the bulk of his time with Long Island. In 19 games of the G-League regular season, he averaged an impressive 17.4 points in 30.6 minutes per game, to go along with 7.8 rebounds and 1.8 blocks per game, both team highs, helping Long Island to a 19–15 record and a playoff bid.

On March 21, 2024, shortly before the G-League playoffs, he was again recalled to the Brooklyn Nets where he has remained since. He saw steady increases in appearances and minutes from this point through the end of the season and made the most of his opportunities. On April 3, Clowney recorded 22 points, 10 rebounds and one assist off the bench in a 115–111 win against the Indiana Pacers, going 7-for-9 from the field and 3-for-4 from three in just 17 minutes of playing time. Despite the valiant effort, the win marked the Nets' elimination from playoff contention as the Atlanta Hawks' 121–113 win over the Detroit Pistons put the final Play-In Tournament spot out of reach. With this came a marked increase for minutes for Clowney as Cam Johnson and Dorian Finney-Smith shut it down for the season. He started the final four games of the season for Brooklyn, the first of which (a 77–107 loss to the Sacramento Kings) was his first NBA start, where he recorded 7 points and 10 rebounds in 35 minutes.

==== 2024–25 season ====
Clowney made 46 appearances (20 starts) for Brooklyn during the 2024–25 NBA season, averaging 9.1 points, 3.9 rebounds, and 0.9 assists. On April 2, 2025, Clowney was ruled out for the remainder of the season due to a right ankle sprain.

==== 2025–26 season ====
Clowney logged career-highs with 31 points and seven three-pointers in a losing effort against the New York Knicks on November 24, 2025.

== Career statistics ==
Legend
| GP | Games played | GS | Games started | MPG | Minutes per game |
| FG% | Field goal percentage | 3P% | 3-point field goal percentage | FT% | Free throw percentage |
| RPG | Rebounds per game | APG | Assists per game | SPG | Steals per game |
| BPG | Blocks per game | PPG | Points per game | **Bold** | Career high |

=== NBA ===
| Year | Team | GP | GS | MPG | FG% | 3P% | FT% | RPG | APG | SPG | BPG | PPG |
|---|---|---|---|---|---|---|---|---|---|---|---|---|
| 2023–24 | Brooklyn | 23 | 4 | 16.1 | **.538** | **.364** | .700 | 3.5 | .8 | .3 | **.7** | 5.8 |
| 2024–25 | Brooklyn | 46 | 20 | 22.7 | .358 | .333 | **.838** | 3.9 | .9 | .5 | .5 | 9.1 |
| 2025–26 | Brooklyn | **66** | **60** | **27.0** | .396 | .329 | .804 | **4.1** | **1.6** | **.8** | **.7** | **12.3** |
| Career | | 135 | 84 | 23.6 | .395 | .332 | .802 | 4.0 | 1.2 | .6 | .6 | 10.1 |

=== College ===
| Year | Team | GP | GS | MPG | FG% | 3P% | FT% | RPG | APG | SPG | BPG | PPG |
|---|---|---|---|---|---|---|---|---|---|---|---|---|
| 2022–23 | Alabama | 36 | 36 | 25.4 | .486 | .283 | .649 | 7.9 | .8 | .6 | .9 | 9.8 |
