= Malachi Smith (basketball) =

American basketball player (born 1999)

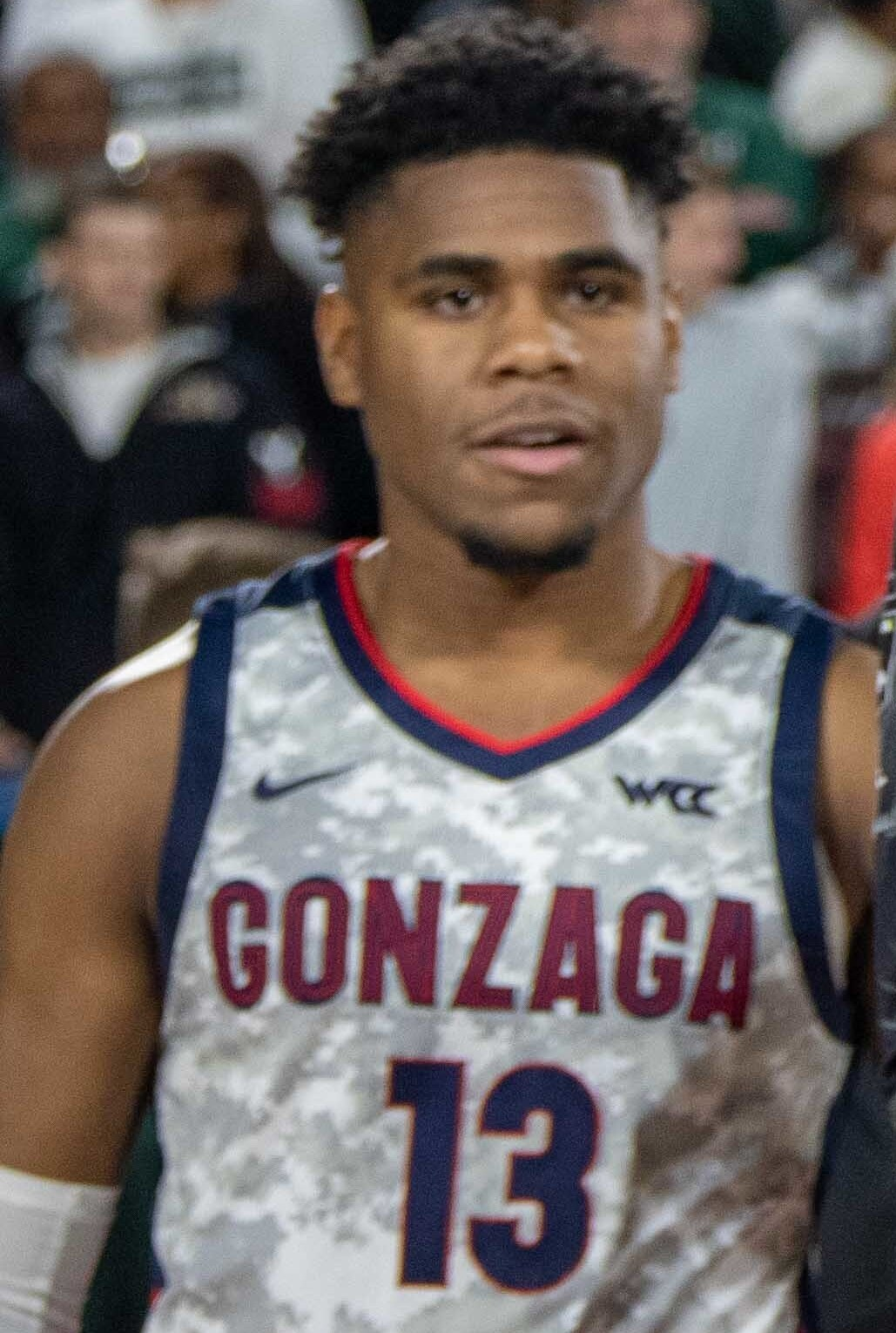
- Smith in 2022

No. 18 – Toronto Raptors
- Position: Point guard
- League: NBA

Personal information
- Born: December 6, 1999 (age 26) Evansville, Indiana, U.S.
- Listed height: 6 ft 4 in (1.93 m)
- Listed weight: 205 lb (93 kg)

Career information
- High school: Belleville East (Belleville, Illinois); Belleville West (Belleville, Illinois)
- College: Wright State (2018–2019); Chattanooga (2020–2022); Gonzaga (2022–2023)
- NBA draft: 2023: undrafted
- Playing career: 2023–present

Career history
- 2023–2024: Rip City Remix
- 2024: Wisconsin Herd
- 2024–2025: Memphis Hustle
- 2025–2026: Long Island Nets
- 2026: Brooklyn Nets
- 2026–present: Toronto Raptors
- 2026–present: →Raptors 905

Career highlights
- Lou Henson Award (2022); SoCon Player of the Year (2022); First-team All-SoCon (2022); First-team All-SoCon – Coaches (2021); Second-team All-SoCon – Media (2021); WCC Sixth Man of the Year (2023); Horizon League All-Freshman Team (2019)
- Stats at NBA.com
- Stats at Basketball Reference

Malachi Knight-Smith (born December 6, 1999) is an American professional basketball player for the Toronto Raptors of the National Basketball Association (NBA), on a two-way contract with the Raptors 905 of the NBA G League. He played college basketball for the Wright State Raiders, Chattanooga Mocs, and Gonzaga Bulldogs.

== High school career ==
Smith started playing high school basketball at Belleville High School-East in Belleville, Illinois before transferring to Belleville High School-West for his senior season. At Belleville West, he averaged 15.5 points alongside E. J. Liddell and helped his team win its first Class 4A state title. Smith committed to playing college basketball for Wright State in November 2017, choosing the Raiders over Lindenwood, Montana State and Denver.

== College career ==
As a freshman at Wright State, Smith averaged 5.4 points and 2.9 rebounds per game, earning Horizon League All-Freshman Team honors. For his sophomore season, he transferred to Chattanooga and sat out for one year due to transfer rules. Smith averaged 16.8 points, 8.8 rebounds and 3.3 assists per game, earning First Team All-Southern Conference (SoCon) honors from the league's coaches, in his first year with the team. He declared for the 2021 NBA draft before returning to college. On November 18, 2021, he scored a career-high 36 points in an 87–76 loss to Murray State.

At the close of his sophomore season, Smith was named the Southern Conference Player of the Year by both the league's coaches and media.

== Professional career ==
=== Rip City Remix (2023–2024) ===
After going undrafted in the 2023 NBA draft, Smith joined the Portland Trail Blazers for the 2023 NBA Summer League and on October 2, 2023, he signed with them. However, he was waived on October 10 and on October 30, he joined the Rip City Remix of the NBA G League.

=== Wisconsin Herd (2024) ===
On January 12, 2024, Smith was traded to the Wisconsin Herd in exchange for Jazian Gortman. He made 27 appearances (including six starts) for the Herd, recording averages of 9.5 points, 4.7 rebounds, and 2.7 assists.

=== Memphis Hustle (2024–2025) ===
On October 9, 2024, Smith was traded to the Memphis Hustle. He made 31 appearances (including eight starts) for Memphis during the 2024–25 NBA G League season, averaging 11.4 points, 4.0 rebounds, and 2.8 assists.

=== Long Island Nets (2025–2026) ===
On September 9, 2025, Smith was traded to the Long Island Nets in exchange for Jordan Minor and a 2026 first-round pick.

=== Brooklyn Nets (2026) ===
On March 13, 2026, Smith signed a 10-day contract with the Brooklyn Nets. He signed a second 10-day contract with Brooklyn on March 24. On April 4, following the expiration of his 10-day deal, Brooklyn re-signed Smith to a two-year, standard NBA contract. On April 10, he recorded 19 points, 10 assists, and eight rebounds in a 108–125 loss to the Milwaukee Bucks. In total, Smith appeared in ten NBA regular-season games, averaging 7.3 points, 2.1 rebounds, and 2.0 assists. On July 10, Smith was waived by the Nets.

=== Toronto Raptors (2026–present) ===
On August 17, 2026, Smith signed with the Toronto Raptors. On September 21, the Raptors converted Smith's deal into a two-way contract.

== Career statistics ==
Legend
GP	Games played	GS	Games started	MPG	Minutes per game
FG%	Field goal percentage	3P%	3-point field goal percentage	FT%	Free throw percentage
RPG	Rebounds per game	APG	Assists per game	SPG	Steals per game
BPG	Blocks per game	PPG	Points per game	**Bold**	Career high

=== NBA ===
Year	Team	GP	GS	MPG	FG%	3P%	FT%	RPG	APG	SPG	BPG	PPG
2025–26	Brooklyn	15	4	23.9	.485	.435	1.000	3.4	3.3	.8	.3	8.3
Career		15	4	23.9	.485	.435	1.000	3.4	3.3	.8	.3	8.3

=== College ===
Year	Team	GP	GS	MPG	FG%	3P%	FT%	RPG	APG	SPG	BPG	PPG
2018–19	Wright State	35	0	15.1	.435	.222	.820	2.9	1.7	.8	.1	5.4
2019–20	Chattanooga	Redshirt										
2020–21	Chattanooga	25	25	**35.8**	.460	.383	.802	**8.8**	**3.3**	1.5	**.2**	16.8
2021–22	Chattanooga	35	**34**	35.4	.493	.407	**.827**	6.7	3.0	**1.7**	.1	**19.9**
2022–23	Gonzaga	**37**	1	20.8	**.536**	**.500**	.792	3.6	1.4	.9	.0	8.7
Career		132	60	26.0	.485	.410	.815	5.2	2.3	1.2	.1	12.3

== Personal life ==
Smith's mother, Connie, served in the United States Air Force for 12.5 years and is currently an ALT Administrator at Ascension. His parents divorced when he was six years old, and he was subsequently raised by his mother. Smith's grandfather, Larry Knight, played professional basketball and was a first-round draft pick by the Utah Jazz.
