= 2025–26 Brooklyn Nets season =

- Head coach: Jordi Fernández
- General manager: Sean Marks
- Owners: Joseph Tsai
- Arena: Barclays Center

Results
- Record: 20–62 (.244)
- Place: Division: 5th (Atlantic); Conference: 13th (Eastern)
- Playoff finish: Did not qualify
- Stats at Basketball Reference

Local media
- Television: YES Network
- Radio: WFAN-AM • WFAN-FM

The 2025–26 Brooklyn Nets season was the 50th season of the franchise in the National Basketball Association (NBA), 59th season overall, and its 14th season playing in the New York City borough of Brooklyn.

On March 12, the Nets were eliminated from playoff contention for the third season in a row following a loss to the Atlanta Hawks. They were also unable to improve their record from their previous season following a loss to the Los Angeles Lakers on March 27. The team finished 13th in the East with a 20–62 record.

== Draft ==
Round	Pick	Player	Position(s)	Nationality	College / Club
1	8	Egor Dëmin	Point Guard	Russia	Brigham Young
1	19	Nolan Traoré	Point Guard	France	Saint-Quentin (France)
1	22	Drake Powell	Shooting Guard	United States	North Carolina
1	26	Ben Saraf	Shooting Guard	Israel	Ratiopharm Ulm (Germany)
1	27	Danny Wolf	Power Forward	Israel	Michigan
2	36	Adou Thiero	Small Forward	United States	Arkansas

The Nets entered the draft holding five different first-round picks, including back-to-back picks near the end of the first-round, and one second-round pick. As part of the seven-team trade that dealt Kevin Durant to the Houston Rockets, the Nets traded their only second round pick to the Los Angeles Lakers and received two future second round picks in return.

== Roster ==
2025–26 Brooklyn Nets roster
Players

Pos.	No.	Player	Height	Weight	DOB	From
G	30	Ochai Agbaji	6 ft 5 in (1.96 m)	215 lb (98 kg)	2000-04-20	Kansas
C	33	Nic Claxton	6 ft 11 in (2.11 m)	215 lb (98 kg)	1999-04-17	Georgia
F/C	21	Noah Clowney	6 ft 10 in (2.08 m)	210 lb (95 kg)	2004-07-14	Alabama
G	8	Egor Dëmin (injured)	6 ft 8 in (2.03 m)	200 lb (91 kg)	2006-03-03	BYU
G	10	Tyson Etienne (TW)	6 ft 0 in (1.83 m)	200 lb (91 kg)	1999-09-17	Wichita State
G/F	31	Chaney Johnson (TW)	6 ft 7 in (2.01 m)	220 lb (100 kg)	2002-06-20	Auburn
F	9	E. J. Liddell (TW)	6 ft 6 in (1.98 m)	240 lb (109 kg)	2000-12-18	Ohio State
G/F	14	Terance Mann	6 ft 6 in (1.98 m)	215 lb (98 kg)	1996-10-18	Florida State
F	00	Josh Minott	6 ft 8 in (2.03 m)	205 lb (93 kg)	2002-11-25	Memphis
F	17	Michael Porter Jr. (injured)	6 ft 10 in (2.08 m)	218 lb (99 kg)	1998-06-29	Missouri
G/F	4	Drake Powell	6 ft 5 in (1.96 m)	195 lb (88 kg)	2005-09-08	North Carolina
G	77	Ben Saraf	6 ft 6 in (1.98 m)	200 lb (91 kg)	2006-04-14	Israel
C	20	Day'Ron Sharpe	6 ft 10 in (2.08 m)	265 lb (120 kg)	2001-11-06	North Carolina
SG	18	Malachi Smith	6 ft 4 in (1.93 m)	205 lb (93 kg)	1999-12-06	Gonzaga
G	88	Nolan Traoré	6 ft 3 in (1.91 m)	185 lb (84 kg)	2006-05-28	France
F	1	Ziaire Williams	6 ft 9 in (2.06 m)	185 lb (84 kg)	2001-09-12	Stanford
F	22	Jalen Wilson	6 ft 6 in (1.98 m)	220 lb (100 kg)	2000-11-04	Kansas
F	2	Danny Wolf (injured)	6 ft 11 in (2.11 m)	250 lb (113 kg)	2004-05-05	Michigan

Coaches
Head coach
- Jordi Fernández
Assistant(s)
- Travis Bader
- Deividas Dulkys
- Ryan Forehan-Kelly
- Dutch Gaitley
- Connor Griffin
- Jay Hernandez
- Steve Hetzel
- Juwan Howard
- Corey Vinson

Legend
- (DP) Unsigned draft pick
- (FA) Free agent
- (S) Suspended
- (GL) On assignment to G League affiliate
- (TW) Two-way affiliate player
- Injured

Roster
Updated: April 12, 2026

== Standings ==
=== Division ===
Atlantic Division	W	L	PCT	GB	Home	Road	Div	GP
y – Boston Celtics	56	26	.683	–	30‍–‍11	26‍–‍15	10‍–‍6	82
x – New York Knicks	53	29	.646	3.0	30‍–‍10	23‍–‍19	14‍–‍3	82
x – Toronto Raptors	46	36	.561	10.0	24‍–‍17	22‍–‍19	5‍–‍12	82
x – Philadelphia 76ers	45	37	.549	11.0	23‍–‍18	22‍–‍19	9‍–‍7	82
Brooklyn Nets	20	62	.244	36.0	12‍–‍29	8‍–‍33	3‍–‍13	82

=== Conference ===
Eastern Conference
#	Team	W	L	PCT	GB	GP
1	c – Detroit Pistons *	60	22	.732	–	82
2	y – Boston Celtics *	56	26	.683	4.0	82
3	x – New York Knicks	53	29	.646	7.0	82
4	x – Cleveland Cavaliers	52	30	.634	8.0	82
5	x – Toronto Raptors	46	36	.561	14.0	82
6	y – Atlanta Hawks *	46	36	.561	14.0	82
7	x – Philadelphia 76ers	45	37	.549	15.0	82
8	x – Orlando Magic	45	37	.549	15.0	82
9	pi – Charlotte Hornets	44	38	.537	16.0	82
10	pi – Miami Heat	43	39	.524	17.0	82
11	Milwaukee Bucks	32	50	.390	28.0	82
12	Chicago Bulls	31	51	.378	29.0	82
13	Brooklyn Nets	20	62	.244	40.0	82
14	Indiana Pacers	19	63	.232	41.0	82
15	Washington Wizards	17	65	.207	43.0	82

== Game log ==
=== Preseason ===
In December 2024, the NBA announced that the Nets and Phoenix Suns would play two of their preseason games at the Venetian Arena in Macau, with the Nets designated the road team in those games. These games mark the first played in China (although not Mainland China) for both the Nets and the NBA since the 2019 preseason, when the Nets met the Los Angeles Lakers. China had boycotted the NBA in response to comments of Daryl Morey (the Houston Rockets' general manager at the time) regarding the 2019–20 Hong Kong protests.

2025 preseason game log
Total: 2–2 (Home: 1–1; Road: 1–1)
Preseason: 2–2 (home: 1–1; road: 1–1)

Game	Date	Team	Score	High points	High rebounds	High assists	Location Attendance	Record
1	October 4	Hapoel Jerusalem	W 123–88	Terance Mann (15)	Nic Claxton (8)	Ben Saraf (6)	Barclays Center; 13,849	1–0
2	October 10	Phoenix	L 127–132 (OT)	Cam Thomas (22)	Nic Claxton (9)	Cam Thomas (6)	(Macau) Venetian Arena; 11,317	1–1
3	October 12	@ Phoenix	W 111–109	Cam Thomas (16)	Claxton, Sharpe (7)	Ben Saraf (11)	(Macau) Venetian Arena; 11,729	2–1
4	October 17	@ Toronto	L 114–119	Michael Porter Jr. (34)	Nic Claxton (11)	Cam Thomas (6)	Scotiabank Arena; 16,950	2–2

2025–26 preseason schedule

=== Regular season ===
2025–26 game log
Total: 20–62 (Home: 12–29; Road: 8–33)
October: 0–5 (home: 0–2; road: 0–3)

Game	Date	Team	Score	High points	High rebounds	High assists	Location Attendance	Record
1	October 22	@ Charlotte	L 117–136	Nic Claxton (17)	Ben Saraf (7)	Martin, Porter Jr. (5)	Spectrum Center; 19,516	0–1
2	October 24	Cleveland	L 124–131	Cam Thomas (33)	Nic Claxton (9)	Cam Thomas (9)	Barclays Center; 17,548	0–2
3	October 26	@ San Antonio	L 107–118	Cam Thomas (40)	Mann, Porter Jr. (6)	Ban Saraf (5)	Frost Bank Center; 19,016	0–3
4	October 27	@ Houston	L 109–137	Terance Mann (21)	Day'Ron Sharpe (12)	Ben Saraf (5)	Toyota Center; 18,055	0–4
5	October 29	Atlanta	L 112–117	Michael Porter Jr. (32)	Nic Claxton (12)	Terance Mann (6)	Barclays Center; 17,548	0–5

November: 3–11 (home: 0–7; road: 3–4)

Game	Date	Team	Score	High points	High rebounds	High assists	Location Attendance	Record
6	November 2	Philadelphia	L 105–129	Cam Thomas (29)	Michael Porter Jr. (17)	Nic Claxton (5)	Barclays Center; 17,548	0–6
7	November 3	Minnesota	L 109–125	Cam Thomas (25)	Nic Claxton (8)	Nic Claxton (7)	Barclays Center; 17,287	0–7
8	November 5	@ Indiana	W 112–103	Michael Porter Jr. (32)	Michael Porter Jr. (11)	Claxton, Mann (6)	Gainbridge Fieldhouse; 16,103	1–7
9	November 7	Detroit	L 107–125	Michael Porter Jr. (28)	Nic Claxton (8)	Egor Dëmin (7)	Barclays Center; 17,548	1–8
10	November 9	@ New York	L 98–134	Michael Porter Jr. (25)	Tyrese Martin (8)	Nic Claxton (5)	Madison Square Garden; 19,812	1–9
11	November 11	Toronto	L 106–119	Claxton, Porter Jr. (21)	Claxton, Clowney (8)	Egor Dëmin (5)	Barclays Center; 17,233	1–10
12	November 14	@ Orlando	L 98–105	Michael Porter Jr. (24)	Michael Porter Jr. (11)	Michael Porter Jr. (7)	Kia Center; 17,902	1–11
13	November 16	@ Washington	W 129–106	Michael Porter Jr. (34)	Claxton, Porter Jr. (9)	Claxton, Porter Jr. (7)	Capital One Arena; 14,164	2–11
14	November 18	Boston	L 99–113	Michael Porter Jr. (25)	Nic Claxton (11)	Terance Mann (7)	Barclays Center; 18,118	2–12
15	November 21	@ Boston	W 113–105	Michael Porter Jr. (33)	Nic Claxton (11)	Nic Claxton (12)	TD Garden; 19,156	3–12
16	November 23	@ Toronto	L 109–119	Tyrese Martin (26)	Nic Claxton (11)	Terance Mann (5)	Scotiabank Arena; 18,038	3–13
17	November 24	New York	L 100–113	Noah Clowney (31)	Day'Ron Sharpe (8)	Tyrese Martin (5)	Barclays Center; 18,019	3–14
18	November 28	Philadelphia	L 103–115	Egor Dëmin (23)	Egor Dëmin (9)	Terance Mann (6)	Barclays Center; 17,809	3–15
19	November 29	@ Milwaukee	L 99–116	Danny Wolf (22)	Day'Ron Sharpe (7)	Ben Saraf (7)	Fiserv Forum; 16,396	3–16

December: 7–4 (home: 4–3; road: 3–1)

Game	Date	Team	Score	High points	High rebounds	High assists	Location Attendance	Record
20	December 1	Charlotte	W 116–103	Michael Porter Jr. (35)	Nic Claxton (11)	Nic Claxton (6)	Barclays Center; 16,443	4–16
21	December 3	@ Chicago	W 113–103	Michael Porter Jr. (33)	Michael Porter Jr. (10)	Nic Claxton (9)	United Center; 20,633	5–16
22	December 4	Utah	L 110–123	Noah Clowney (29)	Claxton, Wolf (9)	Nic Claxton (4)	Barclays Center; 16,485	5–17
23	December 6	New Orleans	W 119–101	Michael Porter Jr. (35)	Nic Claxton (11)	Nic Claxton (10)	Barclays Center; 17,055	6–17
24	December 12	@ Dallas	L 111–119	Michael Porter Jr. (34)	Nic Claxton (10)	Terance Mann (7)	American Airlines Center; 19,032	6–18
25	December 14	Milwaukee	W 127–82	Egor Dëmin (17)	Day'Ron Sharpe (8)	Porter Jr., Sharpe (5)	Barclays Center; 16,439	7–18
26	December 18	Miami	L 95–106	Michael Porter Jr. (28)	Nic Claxton (12)	Nic Claxton (8)	Barclays Center; 17,548	7–19
27	December 21	Toronto	W 96–81	Michael Porter Jr. (24)	Michael Porter Jr. (11)	Terance Mann (7)	Barclays Center; 17,548	8–19
28	December 23	@ Philadelphia	W 114–106	Michael Porter Jr. (28)	Day'Ron Sharpe (11)	Day'Ron Sharpe (6)	Xfinity Mobile Arena; 19,746	9–19
29	December 27	@ Minnesota	W 123–107	Cam Thomas (30)	Michael Porter Jr. (10)	Tied (4)	Target Center; 18,978	10–19
30	December 29	Golden State	L 107–120	Michael Porter Jr. (27)	Claxton, Porter Jr. (9)	Michael Porter Jr. (5)	Barclays Center; 18,163	10–20

January: 3–14 (home: 2–5; road: 1–9)

Game	Date	Team	Score	High points	High rebounds	High assists	Location Attendance	Record
31	January 1	Houston	L 96–120	Cam Thomas (21)	Claxton, Sharpe (8)	Day'Ron Sharpe (7)	Barclays Center; 18,003	10–21
32	January 2	@ Washington	L 99–119	Tied (14)	Day'Ron Sharpe (9)	Nolan Traoré (5)	Capital One Arena; 16,486	10–22
33	January 4	Denver	W 127–115	Michael Porter Jr. (27)	Michael Porter Jr. (11)	Terance Mann (6)	Barclays Center; 17,548	11–22
34	January 7	Orlando	L 103–104 (OT)	Michael Porter Jr. (34)	Day'Ron Sharpe (7)	Dëmin, Sharpe (5)	Barclays Center; 16,916	11–23
35	January 9	L.A. Clippers	L 105–121	Egor Dëmin (19)	Day'Ron Sharpe (9)	Michael Porter Jr. (6)	Barclays Center; 17,548	11–24
36	January 11	@ Memphis	L 98–103	Clowney, Martin (17)	Day'Ron Sharpe (13)	Nolan Traoré (6)	FedExForum; 15,578	11–25
37	January 12	@ Dallas	L 105–113	Michael Porter Jr. (28)	Day'Ron Sharpe (12)	Mann, Traoré (6)	American Airlines Center; 18,632	11–26
38	January 14	@ New Orleans	L 113–116	Michael Porter Jr. (20)	Day'Ron Sharpe (9)	Noah Clowney (6)	Smoothie King Center; 16,201	11–27
39	January 16	Chicago	W 112–109	Michael Porter Jr. (26)	Nic Claxton (14)	Nolan Traoré (7)	Barclays Center; 17,548	12–27
40	January 18	@ Chicago	L 102–124	Nolan Traoré (16)	Noah Clowney (8)	Cam Thomas (10)	United Center; 19,753	12–28
41	January 19	Phoenix	L 117–126	Michael Porter Jr. (23)	Nic Claxton (8)	Terance Mann (8)	Barclays Center; 17,344	12–29
42	January 21	@ New York	L 66–120	Michael Porter Jr. (12)	Michael Porter Jr. (6)	Tied (3)	Madison Square Garden; 19,812	12–30
43	January 23	Boston	L 126–130 (2OT)	Michael Porter Jr. (30)	Claxton, Clowney (9)	Tied (4)	Barclays Center; 17,727	12–31
44	January 25	@ L.A. Clippers	L 89–126	Danny Wolf (14)	Danny Wolf (7)	Egor Dëmin (5)	Intuit Dome; 17,927	12–32
45	January 27	@ Phoenix	L 102–106	Michael Porter Jr. (36)	Day'Ron Sharpe (7)	Nic Claxton (8)	Mortgage Matchup Center; 17,071	12–33
46	January 29	@ Denver	L 103–107	Michael Porter Jr. (38)	Michael Porter Jr. (10)	Nic Claxton (7)	Ball Arena; 19,630	12–34
47	January 30	@ Utah	W 109–99	Egor Dëmin (25)	Egor Dëmin (10)	Nolan Traoré (6)	Delta Center; 18,186	13–34

February: 2–10 (home: 2–4; road: 0–6)

Game	Date	Team	Score	High points	High rebounds	High assists	Location Attendance	Record
48	February 1	@ Detroit	L 77–130	Powell, Thomas (12)	Day'Ron Sharpe (11)	Saraf, Wolf (4)	Little Caesars Arena; 19,899	13–35
49	February 3	L.A. Lakers	L 109–125	Michael Porter Jr. (21)	Day'Ron Sharpe (14)	Day'Ron Sharpe (5)	Barclays Center; 18,248	13–36
50	February 5	@ Orlando	L 98–118	Egor Dëmin (26)	Claxton, Wolf (6)	Nolan Traoré (7)	Kia Center; 18,093	13–37
51	February 7	Washington	W 127–113	Michael Porter Jr. (23)	Day'Ron Sharpe (9)	Danny Wolf (6)	Barclays Center; 17,548	14–37
52	February 9	Chicago	W 123–115	Nic Claxton (28)	Nic Claxton (10)	Nolan Traoré (13)	Barclays Center; 17,038	15–37
53	February 11	Indiana	L 110–115	Nolan Traoré (20)	Day'Ron Sharpe (12)	Nolan Traoré (8)	Barclays Center; 16,779	15–38
All-Star Game
54	February 19	@ Cleveland	L 84–112	Michael Porter Jr. (14)	Danny Wolf (6)	Danny Wolf (7)	Rocket Arena; 19,432	15–39
55	February 20	@ Oklahoma City	L 86–105	Michael Porter Jr. (22)	Michael Porter Jr. (9)	Michael Porter Jr. (5)	Paycom Center; 18,203	15–40
56	February 22	@ Atlanta	L 104–115	Michael Porter Jr. (18)	Nic Claxton (8)	Michael Porter Jr. (6)	State Farm Arena; 17,121	15–41
57	February 24	Dallas	L 114–123	Michael Porter Jr. (26)	Clowney, Dëmin (5)	Nic Claxton (9)	Barclays Center; 16,510	15–42
58	February 26	San Antonio	L 110–126	Michael Porter Jr. (25)	Michael Porter Jr. (14)	Egor Dëmin (9)	Barclays Center; 17,548	15–43
59	February 27	@ Boston	L 111–148	Michael Porter Jr. (18)	Day'Ron Sharpe (5)	Nolan Traoré (7)	TD Garden; 19,156	15–44

March: 3–14 (home: 2–6; road: 1–8)

Game	Date	Team	Score	High points	High rebounds	High assists	Location Attendance	Record
60	March 1	Cleveland	L 102–106	Michael Porter Jr. (26)	Danny Wolf (9)	Williams, Wolf (5)	Barclays Center; 17,804	15–45
61	March 3	@ Miami	L 98–124	Noah Clowney (17)	Day'Ron Sharpe (8)	Danny Wolf (5)	Kaseya Center; 19,700	15–46
62	March 5	@ Miami	L 110–126	Michael Porter Jr. (27)	Michael Porter Jr. (13)	Nolan Traoré (9)	Kaseya Center; 19,700	15–47
63	March 7	@ Detroit	W 107–105	Michael Porter Jr. (30)	Michael Porter Jr. (13)	Tied (4)	Little Caesars Arena; 20,062	16–47
64	March 9	Memphis	W 126–115	Day'Ron Sharpe (19)	Danny Wolf (9)	Ben Saraf (7)	Barclays Center; 16,543	17–47
65	March 10	Detroit	L 100–138	Michael Porter Jr. (19)	Danny Wolf (8)	Ben Saraf (6)	Barclays Center; 17,548	17–48
66	March 12	@ Atlanta	L 97–108	Josh Minott (24)	Danny Wolf (8)	Ben Saraf (4)	State Farm Arena; 15,526	17–49
67	March 14	@ Philadelphia	L 97–104	Danny Wolf (15)	Johnson, Wolf (10)	Ben Saraf (5)	Xfinity Mobile Arena; 18,418	17–50
68	March 16	Portland	L 95–114	Chaney Johnson (17)	Nic Claxton (11)	Tied (4)	Barclays Center; 17,030	17–51
69	March 18	Oklahoma City	L 92–121	Jalen Wilson (15)	Chaney Johnson (7)	Nolan Traoré (6)	Barclays Center; 17,548	17–52
70	March 20	New York	L 92–93	Josh Minott (22)	Nic Claxton (7)	Nolan Traoré (7)	Barclays Center; 18,017	17–53
71	March 22	@ Sacramento	L 122–126	Ben Saraf (22)	Danny Wolf (4)	Ben Saraf (5)	Golden 1 Center; 16,289	17–54
72	March 23	@ Portland	L 99–134	Tyson Etienne (18)	Johnson, Minott (5)	Nolan Traoré (5)	Moda Center; 17,059	17–55
73	March 25	@ Golden State	L 106–109	Ziaire Williams (19)	Terance Mann (5)	Ben Saraf (7)	Chase Center; 18,064	17–56
74	March 27	@ L.A. Lakers	L 99–116	Josh Minott (18)	Nic Claxton (7)	Nolan Traoré (7)	Crypto.com Arena; 18,997	17–57
75	March 29	Sacramento	W 116–99	Ochai Agbaji (18)	Ben Saraf (8)	Saraf, Traoré (6)	Barclays Center; 17,548	18–57
76	March 31	Charlotte	L 86–117	Josh Minott (14)	Drake Powell (6)	Nolan Traoré (4)	Barclays Center; 18,027	18–58

April: 2–4 (home: 2–2; road: 0–2)

Game	Date	Team	Score	High points	High rebounds	High assists	Location Attendance	Record
77	April 3	Atlanta	L 107–141	Nic Claxton (16)	Chaney Johnson (6)	Tied (4)	Barclays Center; 17,548	18–59
78	April 5	Washington	W 121–115	Nolan Traoré (23)	Trevon Scott (8)	Nolan Traoré (7)	Barclays Center; 17,257	19–59
79	April 7	Milwaukee	W 96–90	E. J. Liddell (21)	Tied (5)	Malachi Smith (4)	Barclays Center; 16,834	20–59
80	April 9	Indiana	L 94–123	E. J. Liddell (26)	E. J. Liddell (10)	Saraf, Smith (6)	Barclays Center; 17,548	20–60
81	April 10	@ Milwaukee	L 108–125	Tyson Etienne (23)	Malachi Smith (8)	Malachi Smith (10)	Fiserv Forum; 17,379	20–61
82	April 12	@ Toronto	L 101–136	Tyson Etienne (20)	Chaney Johnson (13)	Malachi Smith (6)	Scotiabank Arena; 18,778	20–62

2025–26 season schedule

=== NBA Cup ===
==== East Group B ====
Pos	Team	Pld	W	L	PF	PA	PD	Qualification
1	Orlando Magic	4	4	0	484	420	+64	Advanced to knockout rounds
2	Boston Celtics	4	2	2	441	458	−17	
3	Detroit Pistons	4	2	2	462	441	+21	
4	Philadelphia 76ers	4	1	3	431	470	−39	
5	Brooklyn Nets	4	1	3	421	450	−29	

Source: NBA

== Player statistics ==
Legend
GP	Games played	GS	Games started	MPG	Minutes per game
FG%	Field-goal percentage	3P%	3-point field-goal percentage	FT%	Free-throw percentage
RPG	Rebounds per game	APG	Assists per game	SPG	Steals per game
BPG	Blocks per game	PPG	Points per game

=== Regular season ===
Brooklyn Nets statistics
Player	GP	GS	MPG	FG%	3P%	FT%	RPG	APG	SPG	BPG	PPG
Ochai Agbaji^{†}	20	0	16.2	.455	.349	786	2.3	.9	.4	.3	6.7
Nic Claxton	69	68	27.8	.571	.158	.616	6.9	3.7	.7	1.1	11.7
Noah Clowney	66	60	27.0	.396	.329	.804	4.1	1.6	.8	.7	12.3
Egor Dëmin	52	45	25.2	.399	.385	.831	3.2	3.3	.8	.3	10.3
Tyson Etienne	24	2	15.8	.400	.398	.833	1.1	1.7	.5	.0	7.9
Chaney Johnson	17	1	20.5	.543	.300	.800	4.6	2.1	.9	.5	8.2
E. J. Liddell	26	5	13.4	.486	.346	.808	2.7	.9	.2	.4	5.7
Terance Mann	63	51	24.3	.457	.364	.788	3.2	3.0	.7	.2	7.2
Tyrese Martin^{†}	37	6	18.8	.392	.336	.731	2.9	1.9	.6	.1	7.3
Josh Minott^{†}	16	1	19.3	.491	.395	.800	2.5	.8	1.3	.8	10.8
Grant Nelson	4	0	8.8	.556		.700	1.5	1.3	.3	1.3	4.3
Michael Porter Jr.	52	52	32.5	.463	.363	.859	7.1	3.0	1.1	.3	24.2
Drake Powell	63	24	21.0	.402	.280	.896	1.8	1.4	.6	.2	6.5
Ben Saraf	44	11	20.8	.396	.211	.830	2.1	3.3	.9	.2	7.5
Trevon Scott	6	4	30.3	.380	.316	.667	5.2	1.7	1.3	.8	8.0
Day'Ron Sharpe	62	7	18.7	.601	.231	.678	6.7	2.3	1.1	.4	8.7
Malachi Smith	15	4	23.9	.485	.435	1.000	3.4	3.3	.8	.3	8.3
Cam Thomas^{†}	24	8	24.3	.399	.325	.843	1.8	3.1	.2	.1	15.6
Nolan Traoré	56	31	22.2	.380	.318	.787	1.8	3.8	.8	.4	8.9
Ziaire Williams	56	13	22.9	.425	.343	.850	2.4	1.1	1.4	.4	10.2
Jalen Wilson	54	2	15.9	.396	.355	.719	2.1	.9	.4	.0	6.4
Danny Wolf	57	15	20.8	.405	.322	.771	4.9	2.2	.5	.6	8.9

- ^{†} Denotes player spent time with another team in the season. Stats reflect time with the Nets only.

== Transactions ==
=== Trades ===
July 6, 2025
Seven–team trade
To Houston Rockets

• (United States) Kevin Durant (from Phoenix) • (Switzerland) Clint Capela (sign-and-trade deal from Atlanta)

To Atlanta Hawks

• (United States) David Roddy (from Houston) • Rights to swap 2031 second-round pick with Houston • $85,300 (from Houston)

To Golden State Warriors

• Draft rights to (Australia) Alex Toohey (No. 52) [from Phoenix] • Draft rights to (United States) Jahmai Mashack (No. 59) [from Houston]

To Minnesota Timberwolves

• Draft rights to (Australia) Rocco Zikarsky (No. 45) [from L.A. Lakers] • 2026 second-round pick (from Denver or Golden State via Phoenix) • Most favorable 2032 second-round pick between Houston and Phoenix • $3,250,000 (from L.A. Lakers)

To Los Angeles Lakers

• Draft rights to (United States) Adou Thiero (No. 36) [from Brooklyn]

To Brooklyn Nets

• 2026 second-round pick (from Boston, Indiana, the L.A. Clippers, or Miami via Houston) • 2030 second-round pick (from Boston via Houston)

To Phoenix Suns

• (United States) Jalen Green (from Houston) • (Canada) Dillon Brooks (from Houston) • (United States) Daeqwon Plowden (two-way contract from Atlanta) • Draft rights to (South Sudan) Khaman Maluach (No. 10) [from Houston] • Draft rights to (United States) Rasheer Fleming (No. 31) [from Minnesota] • Draft rights to (Dominican Republic) Koby Brea (No. 41) [from Golden State] • 2026 second-round pick (from Dallas, Oklahoma City, or Philadelphia via Houson) • Least favorable 2032 second-round pick between Houston and Minnesota

I: The 2026 second-round pick that originally would be going to Phoenix before sent to the Minnesota Timberwolves in the seven-team mega-trade would either be the lesser 2026 NBA draft selection previously held by the Denver Nuggets due to a previous trade the Suns made with Charlotte earlier in the year back in their previous season of play or by the Golden State Warriors through multiple trades on their end.
II: The 2032 second-round pick that would be sent to Minnesota will be the selection that's considered the higher selection between Houston and Phoenix, while the Suns would keep the lesser of the second-round picks between the Rockets and Timberwolves. As such, if the Suns have a worse record by 2032 than Houston, the trade would effectively be the Suns getting the worst selection between the Timberwolves and Rockets, while Houston sends out the Suns' second-round pick that year out to Minnesota alongside the Timberwolves keeping the remaining second-round pick of the three teams instead. However, if the Rockets hold a better record than the Suns by 2032, then Houston would send Phoenix's second-round pick either right back to the Suns or out to the Timberwolves (depending on which team between them had the better overall record by that year), while Minnesota would have both of the remaining second-round picks between the three teams instead.
III: Due to another trade the Brooklyn Nets made with the Memphis Grizzlies (thus making the transaction more complex to cover efficiently due to the amount of previous trades involved before this one (including a previous deal involving the Suns, funnily enough)), the Nets will receive either the Los Angeles Clippers' own 2026 second-round pick without any stipulations involved with it or one of the second-round picks that was originally held by either the Boston Celtics, Indiana Pacers, or Miami Heat, depending on which option is the least favorable amongst the four teams for this season of play.
IV: Due to multiple trades that involved the Houston Rockets before the massive deal that the Suns made, the Rockets will give Phoenix the middle-valued draft pick in the 2026 NBA draft (with the defending champion Oklahoma City Thunder getting the most valuable of the upcoming selections and the San Antonio Spurs getting the least valuable of the upcoming selections by a different trade involving them) between the Dallas Mavericks, the defending-champion Oklahoma City Thunder, and the Philadelphia 76ers.

=== Free agency ===
==== Re-signed ====
Date	Player	Ref.

==== Additions ====
Date	Player	Former Team	Ref.

==== Subtractions ====
Date	Player	Reason	New Team	Ref.
October 1, 2025	(United States) De'Anthony Melton	Free agency	Golden State Warriors	
