= Nolan Traoré =

French basketball player (born 2006)

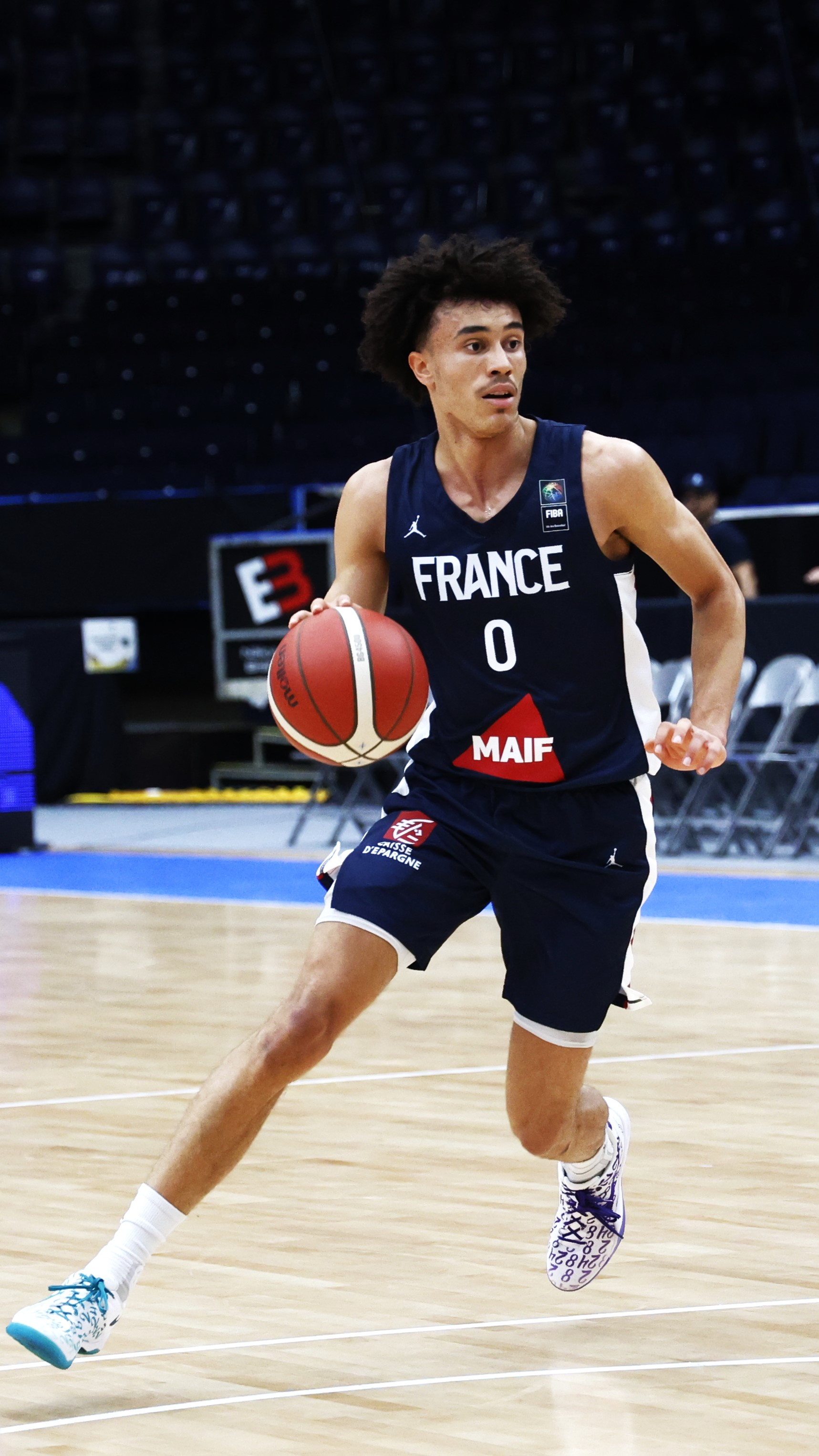
- Traoré with the French under-18 team in 2024

No. 10 – Brooklyn Nets
- Position: Point guard
- League: NBA

Personal information
- Born: 28 May 2006 (age 20) Créteil, Val-de-Marne, France
- Listed height: 6 ft 4 in (1.93 m)
- Listed weight: 190 lb (86 kg)

Career information
- NBA draft: 2025: 1st round, 19th overall pick
- Drafted by: Brooklyn Nets
- Playing career: 2021–present

Career history
- 2021–2024: Centre Fédéral
- 2024–2025: Saint-Quentin
- 2025–present: Brooklyn Nets
- 2025: Long Island Nets

Career highlights
- FIBA Champions League Best Young Player (2025); Nike Hoop Summit (2024)
- Stats at NBA.com
- Stats at Basketball Reference

Nolan Traoré (born 28 May 2006) is a French professional basketball player for the Brooklyn Nets of the National Basketball Association (NBA). He was selected by the Nets with the 19th overall pick in the 2025 NBA draft.

== Early life ==
Traoré was born on 28 May 2006 and grew up in the French commune Chennevières-sur-Marne in the southern suburbs of Paris. He is the younger brother of basketball player Armel Traoré. He began playing basketball at age four with the club COC Chennevières, and played with them from 2010 to 2014. He then spent three years with VGA Saint-Maur Omnisports, being a member of the U9, U10, and U11 teams there.

Traoré joined the club Saint-Charles Charenton in 2017. While at Saint-Charles Charenton, he also played for the Pôle Espoirs Île-de-France from 2019 to 2021; he played at the French junior championships in 2020–21 and averaged over 16 points per game.

Traoré received his baccalauréat in 2023, one year early. He's Ivorian descent through his father.

== Professional career ==
=== Centre Fédéral (2021–2024) ===
Traoré was admitted to the training institute INSEP in 2021 and began playing for their affiliated team, Centre Fédéral de Basket-ball. Playing in the French third tier, Nationale Masculine 1, he averaged 2.2 points in 2021–22, 11.2 points in 2022–23, and then 16.8 points in 2023–24. He was their leading player during the 2023–24 season and had a rating of over 30 in several games; he was also named the team's player of the month multiple times. In the 2024 Adidas Next Generation Tournament (ANGT) against Barcelona, he scored a record 45 points while helping INSEP win in overtime. He won an award at the end of the season as the best young player in the league.

=== Saint-Quentin (2024–2025) ===
Traoré was signed to Saint-Quentin Basket-Ball in the French top tier, LNB Élite, at the end of March 2024, and later made his debut against AS Monaco. Later in the season, he set the all-time league record for most points in a game by a player under 18, with 25. He ended the season with seven games played and 10.3 points per game.

Traoré was projected as a lottery pick in ESPN's February 2024 mock 2025 NBA draft. In April 2024, he participated in the Nike Hoop Summit all-star game, being one of the top performers with 18 points and four assists against top-ranked NBA prospects. After the season 2023–24 season, Traoré had offers to play for a number of teams, including many top U.S. college basketball programs, but opted to stay in France, announcing his intention to sign a two-year contract with Saint-Quentin on 1 June 2024. On 3 October, Traoré made his European debut and scored 27 points in a Champions League home win against Kolossos Rhodes. It was the most points scored in a Champions League game by a player under age 21, beating the previous record of Alperen Şengün. On 10 May 2025, Traoré was named the Basketball Champions League Best Young Player.

=== Brooklyn Nets (2025–present) ===
On 25 June 2025, the Brooklyn Nets selected Traoré with the 19th overall pick in the 2025 NBA draft. On December 15, he was assigned to their G League affiliate, the Long Island Nets.

== National team career ==
Traoré represented France at the 2022 FIBA U16 European Championship, averaging 13.6 points. In 2023, he participated at the FIBA U18 European Championship and averaged 8.6 points.

== Career statistics ==
Legend
| GP | Games played | GS | Games started | MPG | Minutes per game |
| FG% | Field goal percentage | 3P% | 3-point field goal percentage | FT% | Free throw percentage |
| RPG | Rebounds per game | APG | Assists per game | SPG | Steals per game |
| BPG | Blocks per game | PPG | Points per game | **Bold** | Career high |

=== NBA ===
| Year | Team | GP | GS | MPG | FG% | 3P% | FT% | RPG | APG | SPG | BPG | PPG |
|---|---|---|---|---|---|---|---|---|---|---|---|---|
| 2025–26 | Brooklyn | 56 | 31 | 22.2 | .380 | .318 | .787 | 1.8 | 3.8 | .8 | .4 | 8.9 |
| Career | | 56 | 31 | 22.2 | .380 | .318 | .787 | 1.8 | 3.8 | .8 | .4 | 8.9 |
