= Chaney Johnson =

American basketball player (born 2002)

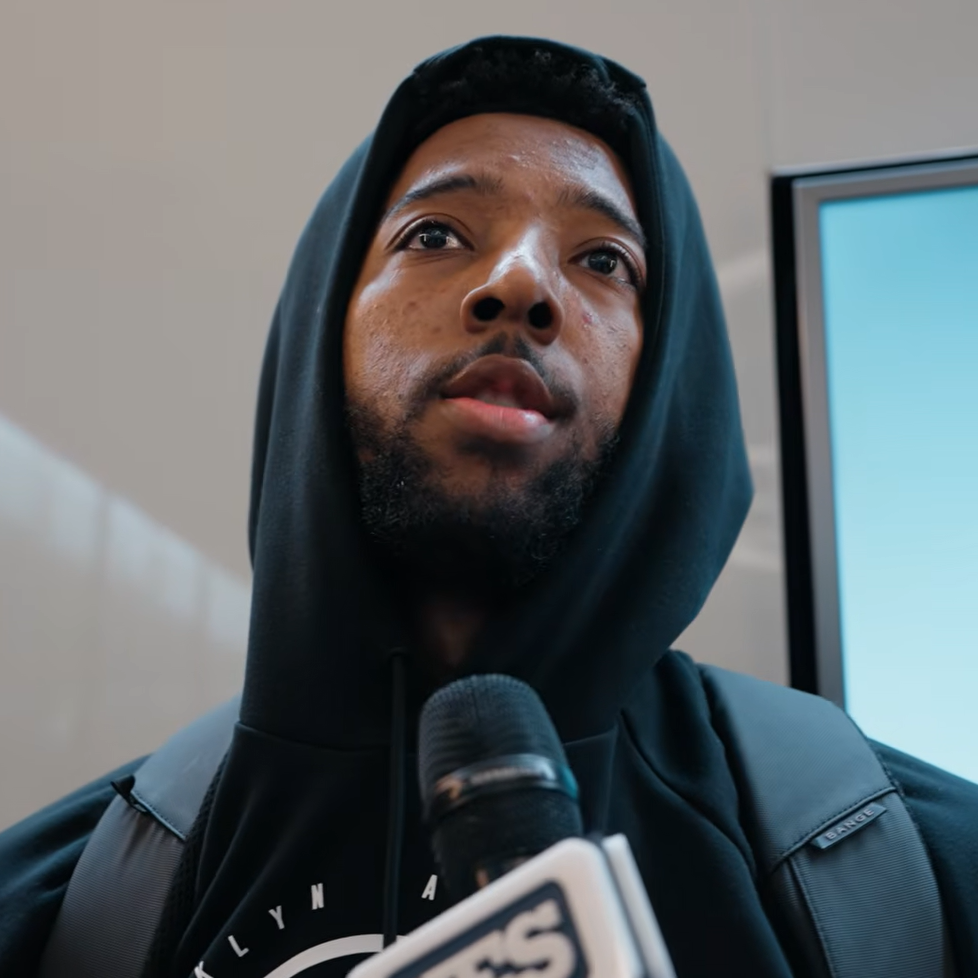
- Johnson with the Brooklyn Nets in 2026

No. 31 – Brooklyn Nets
- Position: Small forward / shooting guard
- League: NBA

Personal information
- Born: June 20, 2002 (age 24) Alabaster, Alabama, U.S.
- Listed height: 6 ft 7 in (2.01 m)
- Listed weight: 220 lb (100 kg)

Career information
- High school: Thompson (Alabaster, Alabama)
- College: UAH (2021–2023); Auburn (2023–2025)
- NBA draft: 2025: undrafted
- Playing career: 2025–present

Career history
- 2025: Cleveland Charge
- 2025–present: Brooklyn Nets
- 2025–present: →Long Island Nets

Career highlights
- Gulf South Player of the Year (2023); 2× First-team All-Gulf South (2022, 2023)
- Stats at NBA.com
- Stats at Basketball Reference

Chaney J. Johnson (born June 20, 2002) is an American professional basketball player for the Brooklyn Nets of the National Basketball Association (NBA), on a two-way contract with the Long Island Nets of the NBA G League. He played college basketball for the UAH Chargers and Auburn Tigers.

== College career ==
Holding no offers from power programs coming out of Thompson High School in Alabaster, Alabama, Johnson began his collegiate career with the Division II University of Alabama, Huntsville in 2020. During the 2022–23 season, he averaged 15.9 points and 6.6 rebounds, leading the team to a 27–8 record and regular-season championship title. Johnson was named the Gulf South Conference Player of the Year for the season.

On April 21, 2023, Johnson transferred to Auburn. In the 2023–24 season, he averaged 4.7 points, 3.4 rebounds, and 0.8 assists across 35 appearances (two starts). During the 2024–25 campaign, his final collegiate season, Johnson averaged 9.1 points and 4.9 rebounds, helping Auburn make a run to the Final Four.

== Professional career ==
=== Cleveland Charge (2025) ===
After going unselected in the 2025 NBA draft, Johnson signed an Exhibit 10 contract with the Cleveland Cavaliers on June 27, 2025. He was waived prior to the start of the regular season on October 14. Johnson subsequently joined the Cleveland Charge of the NBA G League, where he averaged 12.8 points, 5.4 rebounds, 1.9 assists, 1.4 steals, and 1.1 blocks across 16 appearances (10 starts).

=== Brooklyn Nets (2025–present) ===
On December 26, 2025, Johnson signed a two-way contract with the Brooklyn Nets. Johnson made 17 appearances (including one start) for the Nets during the 2025–26 NBA season, recording averages of 8.2 points, 4.6 rebounds, and 2.1 assists.

== Career statistics ==
Legend
GP	Games played	GS	Games started	MPG	Minutes per game
FG%	Field goal percentage	3P%	3-point field goal percentage	FT%	Free throw percentage
RPG	Rebounds per game	APG	Assists per game	SPG	Steals per game
BPG	Blocks per game	PPG	Points per game	**Bold**	Career high

=== NBA ===
Year	Team	GP	GS	MPG	FG%	3P%	FT%	RPG	APG	SPG	BPG	PPG
2025–26	Brooklyn	17	1	20.5	.543	.300	.800	4.6	2.1	.9	.5	8.2
Career		17	1	20.5	.543	.300	.800	4.6	2.1	.9	.5	8.2

=== College ===
==== Division I ====
Year	Team	GP	GS	MPG	FG%	3P%	FT%	RPG	APG	SPG	BPG	PPG
2023–24	Auburn	35	2	15.2	.500	.273	**.744**	3.4	.8	.5	.5	4.7
2024–25	Auburn	**38**	**3**	**23.5**	**.567**	**.294**	.704	**4.9**	**1.3**	**.7**	**.9**	**9.1**
Career		73	5	19.5	.544	.286	.718	4.2	1.1	.6	.7	7.0

==== Division II ====
Year	Team	GP	GS	MPG	FG%	3P%	FT%	RPG	APG	SPG	BPG	PPG
2020–21	UAH	19	0	11.5	.431	.393	.500	1.9	.2	.3	.1	4.4
2021–22	UAH	33	31	23.6	**.586**	**.464**	.748	5.7	1.2	.8	**.7**	**16.8**
2022–23	UAH	**35**	**35**	**25.5**	.518	.296	**.766**	**6.6**	**1.6**	**1.1**	.5	15.9
Career		87	66	21.7	.541	.376	.742	5.2	1.1	.8	.5	13.7
