= Egor Dëmin =

Russian basketball player (born 2006)

Egor Dëmin Егор Дёмин
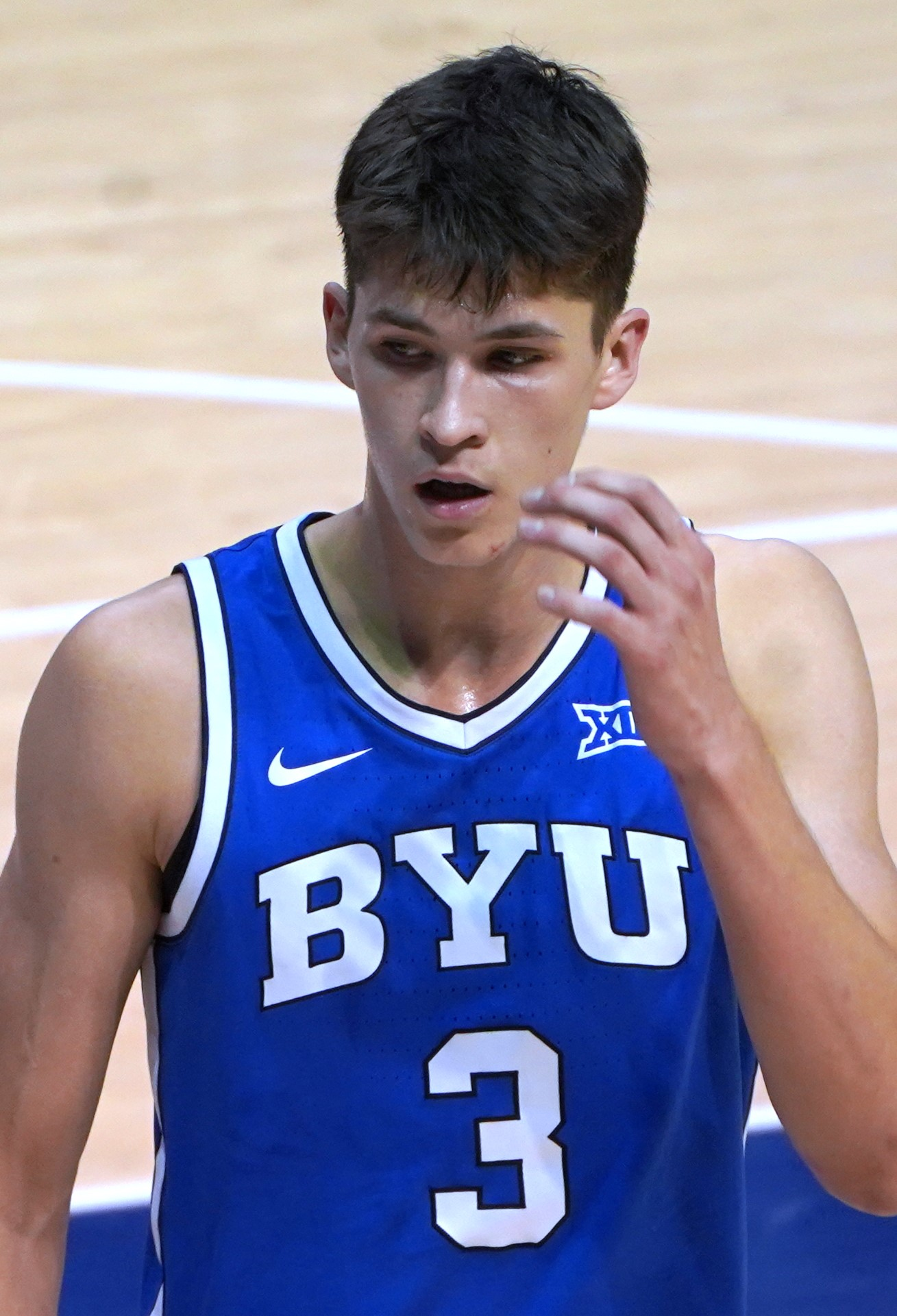
- Dëmin with BYU in 2024

No. 8 – Brooklyn Nets
- Position: Point guard / shooting guard
- League: NBA

Personal information
- Born: 3 March 2006 (age 20) Moscow, Russia
- Listed height: 6 ft 9 in (2.06 m)
- Listed weight: 212 lb (96 kg)

Career information
- College: BYU (2024–2025)
- NBA draft: 2025: 1st round, 8th overall pick
- Drafted by: Brooklyn Nets
- Playing career: 2023–present

Career history
- 2023: Real Madrid
- 2025–present: Brooklyn Nets

Career highlights
- Big 12 All-Freshman Team (2025)
- Stats at NBA.com
- Stats at Basketball Reference

Egor Vladimirovich Dëmin (/jɪˈɡɔːr ˈdjoʊmɪn/ yih-GOR DYOH-min; Russian: Егор Владимирович Дёмин, Russian pronunciation: [jɪˈgor ˈdʲɵmʲɪn]; born 3 March 2006) is a Russian professional basketball player for the Brooklyn Nets of the National Basketball Association (NBA). He played college basketball for the BYU Cougars. He previously played for Real Madrid. He also represents the Russian national team.

== Early life ==
Dëmin was born on 3 March 2006. His father, Vladimir, was also a basketball player. He grew up in Moscow and attended the Moscow Basketball Academy (also known as the Trinta School) where he trained until 2021. He received offers to play with other teams, including BC Khimki, but opted to stay at the academy until age 15 to be with his coach, Evgeny Gorbunov.

Dëmin sent highlight footage to European teams and received six offers by 2021. He was considered a top Russian prospect and signed a six-year contract with Real Madrid in Spain in September 2021, at age 15. Playing for the cadet "A" team in the Real Madrid academy, he helped them win the Spanish Cadet Championship in 2022 while averaging 17.3 points and 4.3 rebounds in the tournament. For the following two seasons, he was a member of the junior "A" team and the Real Madrid B team in the Liga EBA.

Dëmin helped Real Madrid B to the Euroleague Basketball Next Generation Tournament championship in 2023 and scored 10 points in the final, while finishing with averages of 8.5 points and 6.8 rebounds per game. In May 2023, he received a promotion to the main Real Madrid squad and made his debut at the age of 17, playing in just one game there. With Real Madrid B in the 2023–24 season, he played 21 games and averaged 13 points and 5.1 rebounds per game. He also helped Real Madrid B return to the Next Generation Tournament and scored double figures in all four games, including 26 points and 11 rebounds in the final, an 85–84 overtime win over the French academy INSEP.

=== Recruiting ===
Following the 2023–24 season, Dëmin opted to move to the U.S. to play college basketball. He committed to playing college basketball for BYU, where he was the program’s first five-star recruit; he was described in the Deseret News as "arguably the most notable prospect ever to commit to the BYU basketball program."

College recruiting
Name	Hometown	School	Height	Weight	Commit date
Egor Dëmin; PG / SF	Moscow, Russia	—	6 ft 8 in (2.03 m)	190 lb (86 kg)	May 28, 2024
Egor Dëmin; PG / SF	Recruit ratings: Rivals: 247Sports: On3: ESPN: (NR)				
Overall recruit ranking: Rivals: N/A 247Sports: 16 On3: 34 ESPN: N/A
Note: In many cases, Scout, Rivals, 247Sports, On3, and ESPN may conflict in their listings of height and weight.; In these cases, the average was taken. ESPN grades are on a 100-point scale.; Sources: "BYU 2024 Basketball Commitments". Rivals.; "2024 BYU Cougars Recruiting Class". ESPN.; "2024 Team Ranking". Rivals.

== College career ==
As a freshman, Dëmin averaged 10.6 points, 5.5 assists, 3.9 rebounds and 1.2 steals per game. He was selected to the Big 12 All-Freshman Team. Following the season, Dëmin declared for the 2025 NBA draft.

== Professional career ==
Dëmin was selected with the 8th overall pick by the Brooklyn Nets in the 2025 NBA draft. He was signed on 3 July 2025. During a loss to the Golden State Warriors on 29 December, Dëmin broke the Nets franchise record for most three pointers in a single game by a rookie, shooting 7-for-14 on the night. On January 30, 2026, Dëmin made a three-pointer in his 34th straight game, breaking the NBA record for most consecutive games with a made three-pointer by a rookie. That night, he led the Nets with 25 points, 10 rebounds and 5 three-point field goals during a 106-99 win over the Utah Jazz. Dëmin made 52 appearances (including 45 starts) for Brooklyn during his rookie campaign, recording averages of 10.3 points, 3.2 rebounds, and 3.3 assists. On 9 March, Dëmin was ruled out for the remainder of the season due to increased plantar fasciitis in his left foot.

Dëmin returned to the court during the 2026 NBA Summer League. In Las Vegas, despite playing in only 3 of the Nets 5 games, Dëmin averaged 21 ppg and 4.3 apg en route to being named a second team All-Summer league performer. ESPN also named Dëmin the "Best Sophomore" during Summer League.

== National team career ==
Dëmin represented Russia at the 2021 FIBA U16 European Challengers tournament where he had per-40-minute averages of 21.1 points and 6.9 rebounds. His performance at the tournament received comparisons to Luka Dončić by ESPN journalist Mike Schmitz.

== Career statistics ==
Legend
GP	Games played	GS	Games started	MPG	Minutes per game
FG%	Field-goal percentage	3P%	3-point field-goal percentage	FT%	Free-throw percentage
RPG	Rebounds per game	APG	Assists per game	SPG	Steals per game
BPG	Blocks per game	PPG	Points per game	PIR	Performance index rating
**Bold**	Career high

=== NBA ===
Year	Team	GP	GS	MPG	FG%	3P%	FT%	RPG	APG	SPG	BPG	PPG
2025–26	Brooklyn	52	45	25.2	.399	.385	.831	3.2	3.3	.8	.3	10.3
Career		52	45	25.2	.399	.385	.831	3.2	3.3	.8	.3	10.3

=== College ===
Year	Team	GP	GS	MPG	FG%	3P%	FT%	RPG	APG	SPG	BPG	PPG
2024–25	BYU	33	33	27.5	.412	.273	.695	3.9	5.5	1.2	.4	10.6

=== Domestic leagues ===
Year	Team	League	GP	MPG	FG%	3P%	FT%	RPG	APG	SPG	BPG	PPG
2022–23	(Spain) Real Madrid	ACB	1	0.9	.000	.000	—	—	—	—	—	0.0

== Personal life ==
In 2024, Dëmin was one of the nominees for the Russian Forbes 30 Under 30 list.

In 2026, Dëmin was baptised as a member of the Church of Jesus Christ of Latter-day Saints. The baptism was performed by former BYU basketball player Travis Hansen, while his confirmation was conducted by Elder Ronald A. Rasband, a member of the Church’s Quorum of the Twelve Apostles.
