= Nic Claxton =

American basketball player (born 1999)

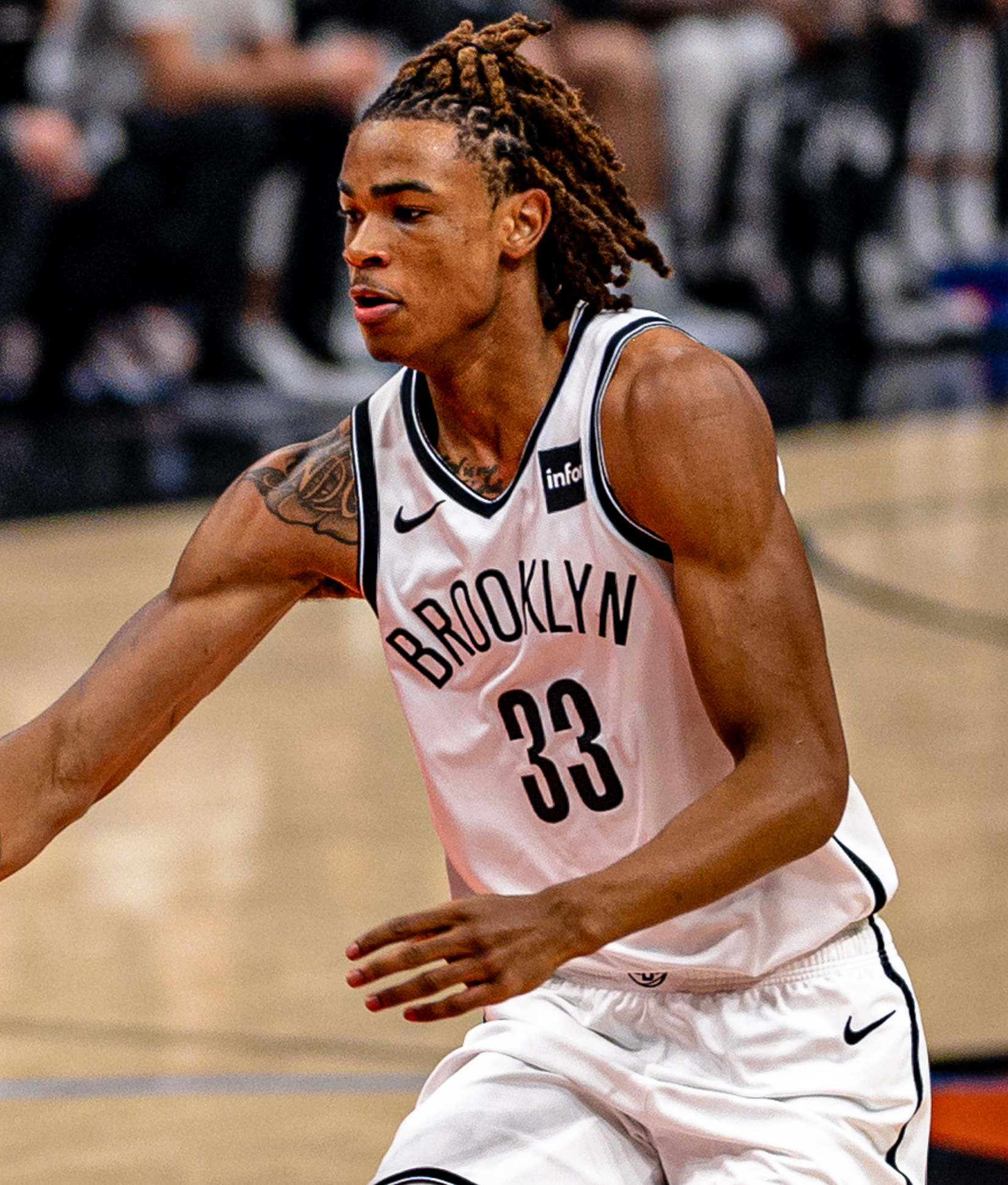
- Claxton with the Brooklyn Nets in 2019

No. 9 – Chicago Bulls
- Position: Center
- League: NBA

Personal information
- Born: April 17, 1999 (age 27) Greenville, South Carolina, U.S.
- Listed height: 6 ft 11 in (2.11 m)
- Listed weight: 215 lb (98 kg)

Career information
- High school: Legacy Charter School (Greenville, South Carolina)
- College: Georgia (2017–2019)
- NBA draft: 2019: 2nd round, 31st overall pick
- Drafted by: Brooklyn Nets
- Playing career: 2019–present

Career history
- 2019–2026: Brooklyn Nets
- 2019–2020: →Long Island Nets
- 2026–present: Chicago Bulls

Career highlights
- Second-team All-SEC – Coaches (2019)
- Stats at NBA.com
- Stats at Basketball Reference

Nicolas Devir Claxton (born April 17, 1999) is an American professional basketball player for the Chicago Bulls of the National Basketball Association (NBA). He played college basketball for the Georgia Bulldogs. Claxton was selected by the Brooklyn Nets with the 31st overall pick in the 2019 NBA draft. He had a breakout season in the 2022-23 NBA season in which he became the starting center for the team since his 3rd season. After seven seasons with the Nets, Claxton was traded to the Bulls in 2026 in a trade that sent Julius Randle to Brooklyn.

== High school career ==
Claxton attended Legacy Charter School in Greenville, South Carolina. In his senior season, he averaged 17.4 points, 7.8 rebounds and 2.9 blocks per game and became the fourth player in school history to record 1,000 career points. Claxton was a three-star recruit and chose to play for Georgia over Baylor, Florida State, NC State and South Carolina.

== Professional career ==
=== Brooklyn Nets (2019–2026) ===
==== Early years and limited role (2019–2021) ====
On June 20, 2019, Claxton was selected with the 31st overall pick in the 2019 NBA draft by the Brooklyn Nets. On July 7, the Nets announced that they had signed Claxton. He made his NBA debut on November 8, recording eight points and six rebounds in a 119–115 win over the Portland Trail Blazers. Claxton suffered a hamstring injury in January 2020 and was assigned to the Nets' NBA G League affiliate, the Long Island Nets, on January 10, 2020. On January 20, he scored a season-high 15 points, alongside four rebounds and two assists, in a 117–111 loss to the Philadelphia 76ers. On June 24, the Nets announced that Claxton had undergone successful arthroscopic labrum repair surgery on his left shoulder and was expected to miss the remainder of the 2019–20 season.

Heading to the 2020–21 season the Nets traded center Jarrett Allen to create more minutes for Claxton. On May 12, 2021, Claxton scored a season-high 18 points, alongside five rebounds and two blocks, in a 128–116 win over the San Antonio Spurs. During the playoffs, the Nets faced the Boston Celtics in the first round. Claxton made his playoff debut on May 22, recording six points and five rebounds in a 104–93 Game 1 win. The Nets ended up winning the series in five games, but lost to the Milwaukee Bucks in seven games during the second round.

==== Emerging as a defensive star and increase production (2021–2026) ====
In the off-season the Nets traded starting center DeAndre Jordan to the Detroit Pistons and named Claxton as their main starting center. On February 2, 2022, Claxton scored a season-high 23 points, alongside eleven rebounds and five blocks, in a 112–101 loss to the Sacramento Kings. In a rematch of last year's series, the Nets faced the Boston Celtics in the first round of the playoffs. The Nets were eliminated in four games, with Claxton averaging 10.5 points and 2.3 blocks per game.

On July 7, 2022, Claxton re-signed with the Nets on a two-year, $20 million contract. He was the Nets' starting center entering the 2021–22 season. On January 26, 2023, Claxton scored a career-high 27 points, alongside 13 rebounds and two blocks, in a 130–122 loss to the Detroit Pistons. He ended the year leading the league in field goal percentage at 70.5%, averaged 2.5 blocks per game, 2nd behind Defensive Player of the Year winner Jaren Jackson Jr., and finished 9th in DPOY voting.

On July 6, 2024, Claxton re-signed with the Nets on a reported four-year, $100 million contract. On October 23, 2024, during the Nets season opener against the Atlanta Hawks, Claxton was ejected clotheslining Hawks guard Dyson Daniels after receiving a flagrant 2 foul which resulted in a scuffle. On December 19, 2024, during a 101–94 win against the Toronto Raptors, Claxton was ejected again in the second quarter for throwing the ball into the stands. Two days later, Claxton was fined $25,000 for his actions.

=== Chicago Bulls (2026–present) ===
On July 10, 2026, Claxton was traded to the Chicago Bulls in a four-team, six-player trade in which the Nets acquired Julius Randle and the draft rights to Joshua Jefferson.

== National team career ==
In 2014, Claxton played for the United States Virgin Islands at the Centrobasket Under-15 Championship in Panama City, averaging a double-double of 10.6 points and 11.8 rebounds per game. He made another appearance for the U.S. Virgin Islands at the 2015 Centrobasket Under-17 Championship in San Juan, Puerto Rico, where he averaged 11 points and eight rebounds per game. Claxton competed at the 2016 FIBA Americas Under-18 Championship in Valdivia, Chile. He averaged a team-high 12 points and 7.2 rebounds per game, leading his team to seventh place. In the summer of 2018, Claxton joined the senior Virgin Islands national team at qualifying competition for the 2019 FIBA World Cup.

Claxton is eligible for the U.S. Virgin Islands team because his father, Charles, was born in St. Thomas.

== Career statistics ==
Legend
GP	Games played	GS	Games started	MPG	Minutes per game
FG%	Field goal percentage	3P%	3-point field goal percentage	FT%	Free throw percentage
RPG	Rebounds per game	APG	Assists per game	SPG	Steals per game
BPG	Blocks per game	PPG	Points per game	**Bold**	Career high
*	Led the league

=== NBA ===
==== Regular season ====
Year	Team	GP	GS	MPG	FG%	3P%	FT%	RPG	APG	SPG	BPG	PPG
2019–20	Brooklyn	15	0	12.5	.563	.143	.524	2.9	1.1	.1	.5	4.4
2020–21	Brooklyn	32	1	18.6	.621	.200	.484	5.2	.9	.7	1.3	6.6
2021–22	Brooklyn	47	19	20.7	.674	—	.581	5.6	.9	.5	1.1	8.7
2022–23	Brooklyn	**76**	**76**	**29.9**	**.705***	.000	.541	9.2	1.9	**.9**	**2.5**	**12.6**
2023–24	Brooklyn	71	71	29.8	.629	.200	.551	**9.9**	2.1	.6	2.1	11.8
2024–25	Brooklyn	70	62	26.9	.563	**.238**	.513	7.4	2.2	**.9**	1.4	10.3
2025–26	Brooklyn	69	68	27.8	.571	.158	**.616**	6.9	**3.7**	.7	1.1	11.7
Career		380	297	26.2	.622	.186	.555	7.6	2.1	.7	1.6	10.6

==== Playoffs ====
Year	Team	GP	GS	MPG	FG%	3P%	FT%	RPG	APG	SPG	BPG	PPG
2021	Brooklyn	**12**	0	10.8	.483	—	**.667**	2.8	.6	.3	1.0	2.5
2022	Brooklyn	4	0	24.5	**.792**	—	.182	6.3	**1.5**	**1.3**	**2.3**	**10.5**
2023	Brooklyn	4	**4**	**29.2**	.720	—	.600	**8.0**	**1.5**	.3	1.8	**10.5**
Career		20	4	17.2	.654	—	.343	4.5	1.0	.5	1.4	5.7

=== College ===
Year	Team	GP	GS	MPG	FG%	3P%	FT%	RPG	APG	SPG	BPG	PPG
2017–18	Georgia	**33**	5	14.7	.449	**.364**	.523	3.9	.2	.2	1.3	3.9
2018–19	Georgia	32	**32**	**31.6**	**.460**	.281	**.641**	**8.6**	**1.8**	**1.1**	**2.5**	**13.0**
Career		65	37	23.0	.457	.302	.611	6.2	1.0	.6	1.9	8.4

== Personal life ==
Claxton is the son of Charles Claxton, a U.S. Virgin Islands native who played college basketball for Georgia and was briefly a member of the Boston Celtics in the 1995–96 NBA season. Nic's younger brother, Chase Claxton, plays Division I basketball for the Winthrop Eagles.

== See also ==
- List of second-generation NBA players
