= Day'Ron Sharpe =

American basketball player (born 2001)

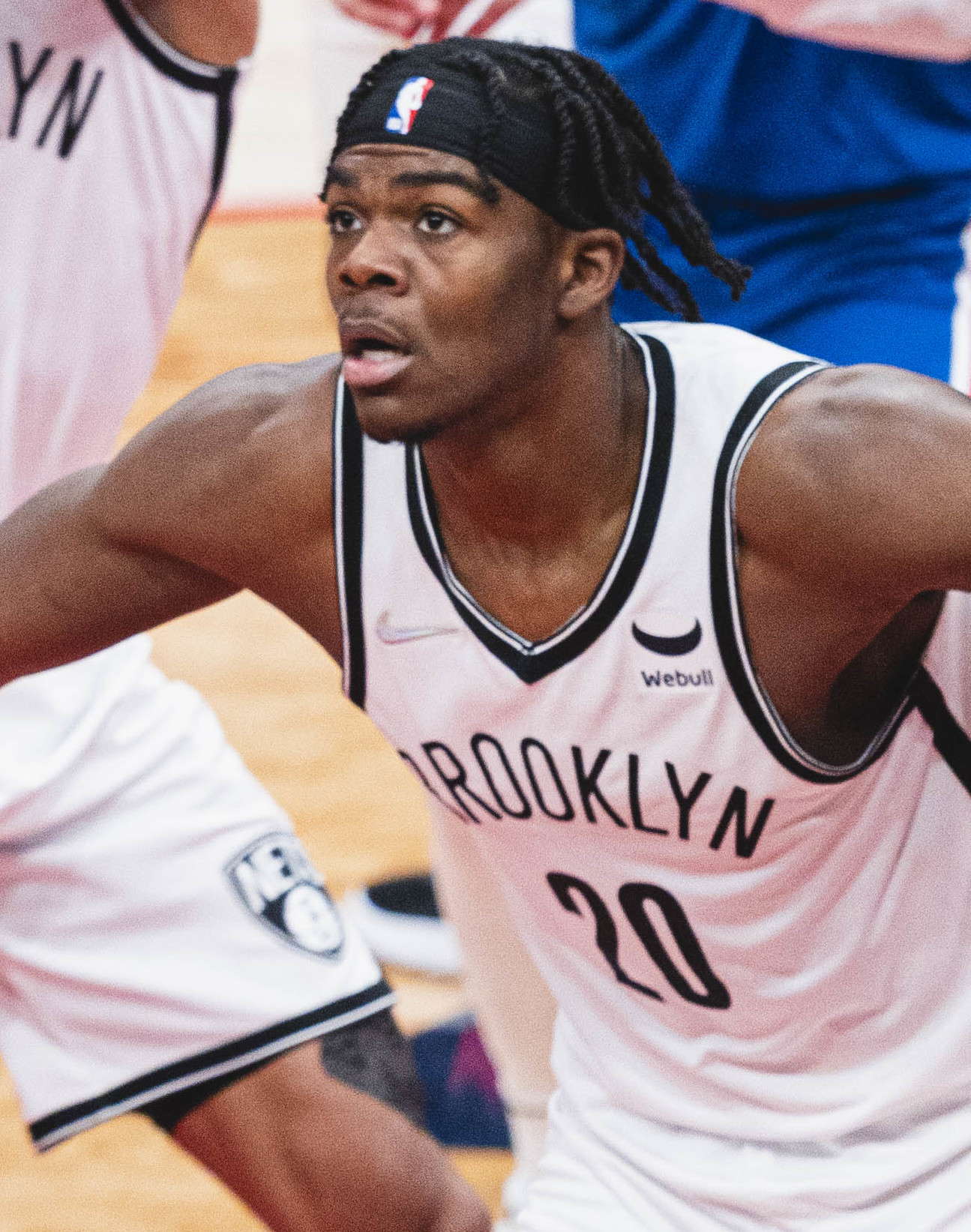
- Sharpe with the Brooklyn Nets in 2022

No. 20 – Brooklyn Nets
- Position: Center
- League: NBA

Personal information
- Born: November 6, 2001 (age 25) Greenville, North Carolina, U.S.
- Listed height: 6 ft 10 in (2.08 m)
- Listed weight: 265 lb (120 kg)

Career information
- High school: South Central (Winterville, North Carolina); Montverde Academy (Montverde, Florida)
- College: North Carolina (2020–2021)
- NBA draft: 2021: 1st round, 29th overall pick
- Drafted by: Phoenix Suns
- Playing career: 2021–present

Career history
- 2021–present: Brooklyn Nets
- 2021–2023: →Long Island Nets

Career highlights
- ACC All-Freshman Team (2021); McDonald's All-American (2020)
- Stats at NBA.com
- Stats at Basketball Reference

Day'Ron Yusha Sharpe (born November 6, 2001) is an American professional basketball player for the Brooklyn Nets of the National Basketball Association (NBA). He played college basketball for the North Carolina Tar Heels.

== Early life ==
Sharpe began his high school career playing for South Central High School in Winterville, North Carolina. As a sophomore, he averaged 14.3 points and 9.3 rebounds per game. Sharpe averaged 16.5 points and 10.7 rebounds per game as a junior, helping South Central finish with a 30–1 record and win the NCHSAA Class 4A state title. He announced he was transferring to Montverde Academy for his senior season. Sharpe averaged 12.1 points and 7.3 rebounds per game as a senior, leading Montverde to a 25–0 record and No. 1 national ranking according to MaxPreps. He was named a McDonald's All-American as well as a Jordan Brand All-American. In AAU play, he played for Garner Road.

Sharpe was considered a five-star recruit ranked the No. 5 center in the class of 2020 and the No. 22 overall player by 247Sports. He committed to North Carolina on June 17, 2018, becoming the first member of the class of 2020 to commit to the Tar Heels. Sharpe turned down scholarship offers from Virginia, East Carolina and Georgetown.

College recruiting
Name	Hometown	School	Height	Weight	Commit date
Day'Ron Sharpe; C	Greenville, NC	Montverde Academy (FL)	6 ft 10 in (2.08 m)	246 lb (112 kg)	Jun 17, 2018
Day'Ron Sharpe; C	Recruit ratings: Rivals: 247Sports: ESPN: (94)				
Overall recruit ranking: Rivals: 13 247Sports: 22 ESPN: 12
Note: In many cases, Scout, Rivals, 247Sports, On3, and ESPN may conflict in their listings of height and weight.; In these cases, the average was taken. ESPN grades are on a 100-point scale.; Sources: "North Carolina 2020 Basketball Commitments". Rivals.; "2020 North Carolina Tar Heels Recruiting Class". ESPN.; "2020 Team Ranking". Rivals.

== College career ==
In Sharpe's freshman debut on November 25, 2020, he had 13 points and 10 rebounds in a 79–60 win against College of Charleston. He became the fourth North Carolina player to record a double-double in his debut game, joining Lennie Rosenbluth, Sam Perkins, and Cole Anthony. Sharpe averaged 9.5 points and 7.6 rebounds per game as a freshman. On March 24, 2021, Sharpe declared for the 2021 NBA draft.

== Professional career ==
=== Brooklyn Nets (2021–present) ===
Sharpe was selected with the 29th pick in the 2021 NBA draft by the Phoenix Suns. On August 6, 2021, Jevon Carter and the draft rights to Sharpe were traded to the Brooklyn Nets in exchange for Landry Shamet.

On January 13, 2022, the Nets beat the Chicago Bulls 138–112. In this game, Sharpe played 21 minutes, made 10 of 14 shots, scored 20 points, had seven rebounds and one block. The 20 points in this game set a new personal season–high (his previous record was 14 points, against the Portland Trail Blazers on January 11).

On January 10, 2024, Sharpe was diagnosed with hyperextension of his left knee, according to Nets reporter Brian Lewis. He had suffered the injury during a January 8 against the Trail Blazers, and was scheduled to be re-evaluated in two weeks time. In a March 19 game against the New Orleans Pelicans, Sharpe played 23 minutes and shot 4-for-11 from the field, registering 8 points, a career-high 17 rebounds (previously 15 on December 21, 2023 against the New York Knicks), three assists, and two blocks.

Sharpe made 50 appearances (two starts) for the Nets during the 2024–25 NBA season, averaging 7.9 points, 6.6 rebounds, and 1.8 assists. On June 30, 2025, Sharpe re-signed with the Nets on a two-year, $12 million contract.

Sharpe made 62 appearances (including seven starts) for the Nets during the 2025–26 season, recording averages of 8.7 points, 6.7 rebounds, and 2.3 assists. On March 12, 2026, it was announced that Sharpe would require season-ending surgery to repair a torn ulnar collateral ligament in his left thumb.

On June 29, 2026, Sharpe re-signed with the Nets on a two-year, $20 million contract.

== Career statistics ==
Legend
GP	Games played	GS	Games started	MPG	Minutes per game
FG%	Field goal percentage	3P%	3-point field goal percentage	FT%	Free throw percentage
RPG	Rebounds per game	APG	Assists per game	SPG	Steals per game
BPG	Blocks per game	PPG	Points per game	**Bold**	Career high

=== NBA ===
==== Regular season ====
Year	Team	GP	GS	MPG	FG%	3P%	FT%	RPG	APG	SPG	BPG	PPG
2021–22	Brooklyn	32	**8**	12.2	.577	.286	.585	5.0	.5	.3	.5	6.2
2022–23	Brooklyn	48	3	11.5	.544	**.545**	.636	4.2	.8	.3	.7	4.7
2023–24	Brooklyn	61	1	15.1	.571	.267	.610	6.4	1.4	.4	.7	6.8
2024–25	Brooklyn	50	2	18.1	.521	.244	**.757**	6.6	1.8	.8	**.8**	7.9
2025–26	Brooklyn	**62**	7	**18.7**	**.601**	.231	.678	**6.7**	**2.3**	**1.1**	.4	**8.7**
Career		253	21	15.5	.564	.274	.658	5.9	1.5	.6	.6	7.0

==== Playoffs ====
Year	Team	GP	GS	MPG	FG%	3P%	FT%	RPG	APG	SPG	BPG	PPG
2022	Brooklyn	1	0	.4	—	—	—	.0	.0	.0	.0	.0
2023	Brooklyn	**2**	0	**9.8**	.667	—	1.000	**3.0**	**2.5**	.0	**.5**	**3.0**
Career		3	0	6.7	.667	—	1.000	2.0	1.7	.0	.3	2.0

=== College ===
Year	Team	GP	GS	MPG	FG%	3P%	FT%	RPG	APG	SPG	BPG	PPG
2020–21	North Carolina	29	4	19.2	.519	.000	.505	7.6	1.4	.8	.9	9.5

== Personal life ==
Sharpe was born in Greenville, North Carolina. He was an honor student and also plays piano.
