= 2022–23 New York Knicks season =

Season of National Basketball Association team the New York Knicks

- Head coach: Tom Thibodeau
- President: Leon Rose
- General manager: Scott Perry
- Owners: Madison Square Garden Sports
- Arena: Madison Square Garden

Results
- Record: 47–35 (.573)
- Place: Division: 3rd (Atlantic); Conference: 5th (Eastern)
- Playoff finish: Conference semifinals (lost to Heat 2–4)
- Stats at Basketball Reference

Local media
- Television: MSG TV
- Radio: WEPN-FM

The 2022–23 New York Knicks season was the 77th season of the franchise in the National Basketball Association (NBA). On April 2, 2023, the Knicks clinched a playoff spot after missing the playoffs in the previous season. In the first round of the 2023 NBA playoffs, they faced the Cleveland Cavaliers, winning the series in five games. The Knicks were eliminated from the playoffs in the conference semifinals by the Miami Heat in six games. This would also be the first season of future NBA Finals MVP Jalen Brunson with the team.

== Draft ==
2022 NBA draft picks
Round	Pick	Player	Position	Nationality	School/club
1	11	Ousmane Dieng	SF	France	New Zealand Breakers
2	42	Trevor Keels	SG	United States	Duke

The Knicks entered the draft holding one first-round pick and one second-round pick. The Knicks used their 11th overall pick to select Ousmane Dieng who was then traded to the Oklahoma City Thunder, while the 42nd overall pick was used to select Trevor Keels.

== Roster ==
2022–23 New York Knicks roster
Players

Pos.	No.	Player	Height	Weight	DOB	From
G/F	9	RJ Barrett	6 ft 6 in (1.98 m)	214 lb (97 kg)	2000-06-14	Duke
G	11	Jalen Brunson	6 ft 2 in (1.88 m)	190 lb (86 kg)	1996-08-31	Villanova
G/F	13	Evan Fournier	6 ft 6 in (1.98 m)	205 lb (93 kg)	1992-10-29	France
G	6	Quentin Grimes	6 ft 5 in (1.96 m)	205 lb (93 kg)	2000-05-08	Houston
G	3	Josh Hart	6 ft 4 in (1.93 m)	215 lb (98 kg)	1995-03-06	Villanova
F/C	55	Isaiah Hartenstein	7 ft 0 in (2.13 m)	250 lb (113 kg)	1998-05-05	Germany
G/F	8	DaQuan Jeffries	6 ft 5 in (1.96 m)	225 lb (102 kg)	1997-08-30	Tulsa
G	0	Trevor Keels (TW)	6 ft 5 in (1.96 m)	221 lb (100 kg)	2003-08-26	Duke
G	2	Miles McBride	6 ft 2 in (1.88 m)	200 lb (91 kg)	2000-09-08	West Virginia
G	5	Immanuel Quickley (injured)	6 ft 2 in (1.88 m)	190 lb (86 kg)	1999-06-17	Kentucky
F	30	Julius Randle	6 ft 8 in (2.03 m)	250 lb (113 kg)	1994-11-29	Kentucky
C	23	Mitchell Robinson	7 ft 0 in (2.13 m)	240 lb (109 kg)	1998-04-01	Chalmette HS (LA)
F	18	Isaiah Roby	6 ft 8 in (2.03 m)	230 lb (104 kg)	1998-02-03	Nebraska
G	4	Derrick Rose	6 ft 3 in (1.91 m)	200 lb (91 kg)	1988-10-04	Memphis
C	45	Jericho Sims (injured)	6 ft 9 in (2.06 m)	250 lb (113 kg)	1998-10-20	Texas
F	1	Obi Toppin	6 ft 9 in (2.06 m)	220 lb (100 kg)	1998-03-04	Dayton
G	44	Duane Jr. Washington (TW)	6 ft 3 in (1.91 m)	197 lb (89 kg)	2000-03-24	Ohio State

Coaches
Head coach
- Tom Thibodeau
Assistant(s)
- Rick Brunson
- Johnnie Bryant (associate HC)
- Darren Erman
- Andy Greer
- Larry Greer

Legend
- (DP) Unsigned draft pick
- (FA) Free agent
- (S) Suspended
- (GL) On assignment to G League affiliate
- (TW) Two-way affiliate player
- Injured

Roster
Updated: May 12, 2023

== Standings ==
=== Division ===
Atlantic Division	W	L	PCT	GB	Home	Road	Div	GP
y – Boston Celtics	57	25	.695	–	32‍–‍9	25‍–‍16	11–5	82
x – Philadelphia 76ers	54	28	.659	3.0	29‍–‍12	25‍–‍16	10–6	82
x – New York Knicks	47	35	.573	10.0	23‍–‍18	24‍–‍17	8–8	82
x – Brooklyn Nets	45	37	.549	12.0	23‍–‍18	22‍–‍19	7–9	82
pi – Toronto Raptors	41	41	.500	16.0	27‍–‍14	14‍–‍27	4–12	82

=== Conference ===
Eastern Conference
#	Team	W	L	PCT	GB	GP
1	z – Milwaukee Bucks *	58	24	.707	–	82
2	y – Boston Celtics *	57	25	.695	1.0	82
3	x – Philadelphia 76ers	54	28	.659	4.0	82
4	x – Cleveland Cavaliers	51	31	.622	7.0	82
5	x – New York Knicks	47	35	.573	11.0	82
6	x – Brooklyn Nets	45	37	.549	13.0	82
7	y – Miami Heat *	44	38	.537	14.0	82
8	x – Atlanta Hawks	41	41	.500	17.0	82
9	pi – Toronto Raptors	41	41	.500	17.0	82
10	pi – Chicago Bulls	40	42	.488	18.0	82
11	Indiana Pacers	35	47	.427	23.0	82
12	Washington Wizards	35	47	.427	23.0	82
13	Orlando Magic	34	48	.415	24.0	82
14	Charlotte Hornets	27	55	.329	31.0	82
15	Detroit Pistons	17	65	.207	41.0	82

== Game log ==
=== Preseason ===
The preseason schedule was announced on August 12, 2022.

2022 preseason game log
Total: 3–1 (home: 3–0; road: 0–1)
Preseason: 3–1 (home: 3–0; road: 0–1)

Game	Date	Team	Score	High points	High rebounds	High assists	Location Attendance	Record
1	October 4	Detroit	W 117–96	Barrett (21)	Hartenstein (7)	Brunson (5)	Madison Square Garden; 14,426	1–0
2	October 7	Indiana	W 131–114	Toppin (24)	Robinson (9)	Brunson, Randle (4)	Madison Square Garden; 16,510	2–0
3	October 12	@ Indiana	L 100–109	Barrett (21)	Hartenstein (10)	Hartenstein, Randle (5)	Gainbridge Fieldhouse; 7,081	2–1
4	October 14	Washington	W 105–89	Brunson (27)	Barrett, Robinson (12)	Brunson, Fournier (5)	Madison Square Garden; 19,812	3–1

2022–23 preseason schedule

=== Regular season ===
The regular season schedule was released on August 17, 2022.

2022–23 game log
Total: 47–35 (home: 23–18; road: 24–17)
October: 3–3 (home: 3–0; road: 0–3)

Game	Date	Team	Score	High points	High rebounds	High assists	Location Attendance	Record
1	October 19	@ Memphis	L 112–115 (OT)	Randle (24)	Randle (11)	Brunson (9)	FedExForum; 18,202	0–1
2	October 21	Detroit	W 130–106	Quickley (20)	Hartenstein (11)	Quickley (7)	Madison Square Garden; 19,812	1–1
3	October 24	Orlando	W 115–102	Randle (25)	Randle (12)	Quickley (8)	Madison Square Garden; 18,800	2–1
4	October 26	Charlotte	W 134–131 (OT)	Brunson (27)	Barrett, Robinson (8)	Brunson (13)	Madison Square Garden; 19,812	3–1
5	October 28	@ Milwaukee	L 108–119	Barrett (20)	Randle (12)	Rose (4)	Fiserv Forum; 17,341	3–2
6	October 30	@ Cleveland	L 108–121	Brunson, Fournier (16)	Hartenstein, Randle (9)	Brunson, Randle (7)	Rocket Mortgage FieldHouse; 19,432	3–3

November: 7–9 (home: 1–6; road: 6–3)

Game	Date	Team	Score	High points	High rebounds	High assists	Location Attendance	Record
7	November 2	Atlanta	L 99–112	Brunson (20)	Quickley (16)	Barrett, Brunson (5)	Madison Square Garden; 19,812	3–4
8	November 4	@ Philadelphia	W 106–104	Brunson (23)	Hartenstein, Randle (10)	Brunson (7)	Wells Fargo Center; 20,679	4–4
9	November 5	Boston	L 118–133	Randle (29)	Hartenstein (14)	Brunson (10)	Madison Square Garden; 19,812	4–5
10	November 7	@ Minnesota	W 120–107	Randle (31)	Randle (8)	Brunson (8)	Target Center; 14,524	5–5
11	November 9	@ Brooklyn	L 85–112	Randle (24)	Randle (11)	Quickley (4)	Barclays Center; 18,156	5–6
12	November 11	Detroit	W 121–112	Barrett (30)	Hartenstein (12)	Brunson (7)	Madison Square Garden; 19,812	6–6
13	November 13	Oklahoma City	L 135–145	Reddish (26)	Randle (10)	Brunson (7)	Madison Square Garden; 18,325	6–7
14	November 15	@ Utah	W 118–111	Brunson (25)	Sims (13)	Brunson (8)	Vivint Arena; 18,206	7–7
15	November 16	@ Denver	W 106–103	Randle (34)	Randle (11)	Brunson (7)	Ball Arena; 18,210	8–7
16	November 18	@ Golden State	L 101–111	Randle (20)	Sims (10)	Barrett (5)	Chase Center; 18,064	8–8
17	November 20	@ Phoenix	L 95–116	Brunson (27)	Randle (6)	Grimes (8)	Footprint Center; 17,071	8–9
18	November 21	@ Oklahoma City	W 129–119	Brunson (34)	Randle (11)	Brunson (9)	Paycom Center; 15,079	9–9
19	November 25	Portland	L 129–132 (OT)	Brunson (32)	Barrett (10)	Barrett, Grimes, Quickley (5)	Madison Square Garden; 19,812	9–10
20	November 27	Memphis	L 123–127	Brunson (30)	Randle (10)	Brunson, Randle (9)	Madison Square Garden; 19,524	9–11
21	November 29	@ Detroit	W 140–110	Randle (36)	Robinson (13)	Brunson, Randle (5)	Little Caesars Arena; 14,864	10–11
22	November 30	Milwaukee	L 103–109	Barrett (26)	Robinson (20)	Brunson, Randle (5)	Madison Square Garden; 17,277	10–12

December: 9–6 (home: 4–4; road: 5–2)

Game	Date	Team	Score	High points	High rebounds	High assists	Location Attendance	Record
23	December 3	Dallas	L 100–121	Randle (24)	Toppin (7)	5 players (3)	Madison Square Garden; 18,319	10–13
24	December 4	Cleveland	W 92–81	Brunson (23)	Robinson (11)	Brunson, Randle (4)	Madison Square Garden; 19,007	11–13
25	December 7	Atlanta	W 113–89	Randle (34)	Randle (17)	Brunson, McBride (6)	Madison Square Garden; 18,091	12–13
26	December 9	@ Charlotte	W 121–102	Randle (33)	Robinson (13)	Brunson (11)	Spectrum Center; 17,696	13–13
27	December 11	Sacramento	W 112–99	Barrett, Randle (27)	Barrett, Hartenstein, Robinson (9)	Barrett (6)	Madison Square Garden; 19,812	14–13
28	December 14	@ Chicago	W 128–120 (OT)	Randle (31)	Randle (13)	Brunson, Randle (7)	United Center; 18,820	15–13
29	December 16	@ Chicago	W 114–91	Barrett (27)	Randle (12)	Brunson (6)	United Center; 19,661	16–13
30	December 18	@ Indiana	W 109–106	Brunson (30)	Randle (14)	Brunson, Randle (3)	Gainbridge Fieldhouse; 14,513	17–13
31	December 20	Golden State	W 132–94	Quickley (22)	Randle (12)	Barrett, Brunson, Randle (5)	Madison Square Garden; 19,812	18–13
32	December 21	Toronto	L 106–113	Barrett, Randle (30)	Randle (13)	Brunson (12)	Madison Square Garden; 19,294	18–14
33	December 23	Chicago	L 117–118	Barrett (44)	Randle (12)	Brunson (9)	Madison Square Garden; 19,812	18–15
34	December 25	Philadelphia	L 112–119	Randle (35)	Robinson (16)	Brunson (11)	Madison Square Garden; 19,812	18–16
35	December 27	@ Dallas	L 121–126 (OT)	Grimes (33)	Randle (18)	Quickley (15)	American Airlines Center; 20,377	18–17
36	December 29	@ San Antonio	L 115–122	Randle (41)	Randle (11)	Quickley, Randle (7)	AT&T Center; 18,354	18–18
37	December 31	@ Houston	W 108–88	Randle (35)	Randle, Robinson (12)	Quickley (7)	Toyota Center; 18,055	19–18

January: 8–7 (home: 4–4; road: 4–3)

Game	Date	Team	Score	High points	High rebounds	High assists	Location Attendance	Record
38	January 2	Phoenix	W 102–83	Randle (28)	Randle (16)	Brunson, Randle (6)	Madison Square Garden; 19,812	20–18
39	January 4	San Antonio	W 117–114	Brunson (38)	Randle (13)	Brunson (6)	Madison Square Garden; 19,812	21–18
40	January 6	@ Toronto	W 112–108	Randle (32)	Robinson (18)	Brunson (8)	Scotiabank Arena; 19,800	22–18
41	January 9	Milwaukee	L 107–111	Brunson (44)	Randle (16)	Randle (5)	Madison Square Garden; 18,167	22–19
42	January 11	Indiana	W 119–113	Brunson (34)	Randle (16)	4 players (4)	Madison Square Garden; 18,249	23–19
43	January 13	@ Washington	W 112–108	Brunson (34)	Randle (16)	Brunson (8)	Capital One Arena; 20,476	24–19
44	January 15	@ Detroit	W 117–104	Randle (42)	Randle (15)	Brunson, Randle (4)	Little Caesars Arena; 19,894	25–19
45	January 16	Toronto	L 121–123 (OT)	Barrett (32)	Randle (15)	Randle (8)	Madison Square Garden; 19,812	25–20
46	January 18	Washington	L 105–116	Brunson (32)	Randle (15)	Brunson, Randle (4)	Madison Square Garden; 19,164	25–21
47	January 20	@ Atlanta	L 124–139	Randle (32)	Randle (9)	Brunson (9)	State Farm Arena; 17,711	25–22
48	January 22	@ Toronto	L 116–125	Barrett (30)	Randle (19)	Randle (8)	Scotiabank Arena; 19,261	25–23
49	January 24	Cleveland	W 105–103	Randle (36)	Randle (13)	Quickley (6)	Madison Square Garden; 19,812	26–23
50	January 26	@ Boston	W 120–117 (OT)	Randle (37)	Sims (14)	Brunson (7)	TD Garden; 19,156	27–23
51	January 28	@ Brooklyn	L 115–122	Brunson (26)	Randle, Sims (10)	Randle (8)	Barclays Center; 18,100	27–24
52	January 31	L.A. Lakers	L 123–129 (OT)	Brunson (37)	Hartenstein (13)	Quickley (8)	Madison Square Garden; 19,812	27–25

February: 9–2 (home: 6–1; road: 3–1)

Game	Date	Team	Score	High points	High rebounds	High assists	Location Attendance	Record
53	February 2	Miami	W 106–104	Barrett (30)	Hartenstein, Randle (10)	Randle (6)	Madison Square Garden; 19,044	28–25
54	February 4	L.A. Clippers	L 128–134 (OT)	Brunson (41)	Hartenstein, Randle (11)	Brunson, Randle (7)	Madison Square Garden; 19,812	28–26
55	February 5	Philadelphia	W 108–97	Randle (24)	Hartenstein (14)	Brunson, Randle (7)	Madison Square Garden; 17,586	29–26
56	February 7	@ Orlando	W 102–98	Brunson (25)	Randle (14)	Randle (6)	Amway Center; 19,438	30–26
57	February 10	@ Philadelphia	L 108–119	Brunson, Randle (30)	Randle (10)	Brunson (9)	Wells Fargo Center; 21,057	30–27
58	February 11	Utah	W 126–120	Brunson (38)	Hartenstein (14)	Brunson (5)	Madison Square Garden; 19,339	31–27
59	February 13	Brooklyn	W 124–106	Brunson (40)	Randle (10)	Brunson, Quickley (5)	Madison Square Garden; 19,812	32–27
60	February 15	@ Atlanta	W 122–101	Brunson (28)	Hartenstein, Randle (11)	Brunson (5)	State Farm Arena; 17,771	33–27
61	February 24	@ Washington	W 115–109	Randle (46)	Robinson (12)	Brunson (9)	Capital One Arena; 20,476	34–27
62	February 25	New Orleans	W 128–106	Randle (28)	Robinson (13)	Barrett (7)	Madison Square Garden; 19,812	35–27
63	February 27	Boston	W 109–94	Quickley, Randle (23)	Robinson (13)	Hart (5)	Madison Square Garden; 19,812	36–27

March: 9–6 (home: 4–2; road: 5–4)

Game	Date	Team	Score	High points	High rebounds	High assists	Location Attendance	Record
64	March 1	Brooklyn	W 142–118	Brunson (39)	Robinson (10)	Randle (8)	Madison Square Garden; 19,812	37–27
65	March 3	@ Miami	W 122–120	Randle (43)	Randle (9)	Brunson (8)	Miami-Dade Arena; 19,600	38–27
66	March 5	@ Boston	W 131–129 (2OT)	Quickley (38)	Robinson (14)	Quickley (7)	TD Garden; 19,156	39–27
67	March 7	Charlotte	L 105–112	Barrett (27)	Hart, Randle, Robinson (8)	Quickley (5)	Madison Square Garden; 19,812	39–28
68	March 9	@ Sacramento	L 117–122	Barrett (25)	Hart (15)	Hart (7)	Golden 1 Center; 18,068	39–29
69	March 11	@ L.A. Clippers	L 95–106	Quickley (26)	Robinson (14)	Grimes, Hart, Quickley (4)	Crypto.com Arena; 19,068	39–30
70	March 12	@ L.A. Lakers	W 112–108	Randle (33)	Hartenstein (11)	Randle (5)	Crypto.com Arena; 18,997	40–30
71	March 14	@ Portland	W 123–107	Quickley (26)	Hartenstein (11)	Hart (8)	Moda Center; 19,488	41–30
72	March 18	Denver	W 116–110	Brunson (24)	Hartenstein, Robinson (9)	Brunson, Hart (5)	Madison Square Garden; 19,812	42–30
73	March 20	Minnesota	L 134–140	Randle (57)	Robinson (9)	Brunson (10)	Madison Square Garden; 19,812	42–31
74	March 22	@ Miami	L 120–127	Barrett (26)	Robinson (8)	Randle (9)	Miami-Dade Arena; 19,863	42–32
75	March 23	@ Orlando	L 106–111	Grimes, Quickley (25)	Robinson (12)	Quickley (7)	Amway Center; 17,607	42–33
76	March 27	Houston	W 137–115	Quickley (40)	Grimes (9)	Quickley (9)	Madison Square Garden; 19,812	43–33
77	March 29	Miami	W 101–92	Quickley (24)	Hartenstein (9)	Grimes, Quickley, Toppin (4)	Madison Square Garden; 19,812	44–33
78	March 31	@ Cleveland	W 130–116	Brunson (48)	Robinson (14)	Brunson (9)	Rocket Mortgage FieldHouse; 19,432	45–33

April: 2–2 (home: 1–1; road: 1–1)

Game	Date	Team	Score	High points	High rebounds	High assists	Location Attendance	Record
79	April 2	Washington	W 118–109	Brunson, Grimes (27)	Robinson (11)	Brunson (8)	Madison Square Garden; 19,812	46–33
80	April 5	@ Indiana	W 138–129	Quickley (39)	Robinson (16)	Quickley (9)	Gainbridge Fieldhouse; 16,789	47–33
81	April 7	@ New Orleans	L 105–113	Barrett (28)	Sims (8)	Barrett (6)	Smoothie King Center; 18,656	47–34
82	April 9	Indiana	L 136–141	Toppin (34)	Robinson (20)	Quickley (7)	Madison Square Garden; 19,812	47–35

2022–23 season schedule

=== Playoffs ===
2023 playoff game log
Total: 6–5 (home: 4–1; road: 2–4)
First round: 4–1 (home: 2–0; road: 2–1)

Game	Date	Team	Score	High points	High rebounds	High assists	Location Attendance	Series
1	April 15	@ Cleveland	W 101–97	Brunson (27)	Hart, Randle (10)	Barrett (6)	Rocket Mortgage FieldHouse; 19,432	1–0
2	April 18	@ Cleveland	L 90–107	Randle (22)	Randle (8)	Brunson (6)	Rocket Mortgage FieldHouse; 19,432	1–1
3	April 21	Cleveland	W 99–79	Brunson (21)	Barrett, Randle (8)	Brunson (6)	Madison Square Garden; 19,812	2–1
4	April 23	Cleveland	W 102–93	Brunson (29)	Robinson (11)	Brunson (6)	Madison Square Garden; 19,812	3–1
5	April 26	@ Cleveland	W 106–95	Brunson (23)	Robinson (18)	Randle (6)	Rocket Mortgage FieldHouse; 19,432	4–1

Conference semifinals: 2–4 (home: 2–1; road: 0–3)

Game	Date	Team	Score	High points	High rebounds	High assists	Location Attendance	Series
1	April 30	Miami	L 101–108	Barrett (26)	Robinson (14)	Barrett, Brunson (7)	Madison Square Garden; 19,812	0–1
2	May 2	Miami	W 111–105	Brunson (30)	Randle (12)	Hart (9)	Madison Square Garden; 19,812	1–1
3	May 6	@ Miami	L 86–105	Brunson (20)	Randle (14)	Brunson (8)	Kaseya Center; 19,927	1–2
4	May 8	@ Miami	L 101–109	Brunson (32)	Randle (9)	Brunson (11)	Kaseya Center; 19,769	1–3
5	May 10	Miami	W 112–103	Brunson (38)	Robinson (11)	Brunson (7)	Madison Square Garden; 19,812	2–3
6	May 12	@ Miami	L 92–96	Brunson (41)	Randle, Robinson (11)	Brunson, Grimes, Randle (3)	Kaseya Center; 19,737	2–4

2023 playoff schedule

== Player statistics ==
Legend
GP	Games played	GS	Games started	MPG	Minutes per game
FG%	Field-goal percentage	3P%	3-point field-goal percentage	FT%	Free-throw percentage
RPG	Rebounds per game	APG	Assists per game	SPG	Steals per game
BPG	Blocks per game	PPG	Points per game

=== Regular season statistics ===
As of April 9, 2023

New York Knicks statistics
Player	GP	GS	MPG	FG%	3P%	FT%	RPG	APG	SPG	BPG	PPG
Ryan Arcidiacono	11	0	2.4	.200	.333	—	.4	.2	.2	.0	.3
RJ Barrett	73	73	33.9	.434	.310	.740	5.0	2.8	.4	.2	19.6
Jalen Brunson	68	68	35.0	.491	.416	.829	3.5	6.2	.9	.2	24.0
Evan Fournier	27	7	17.0	.337	.307	.857	1.8	1.3	.6	.1	6.1
Quentin Grimes	71	66	29.9	.468	.386	.796	3.2	2.1	.7	.4	11.3
Josh Hart	25	1	30.0	.586	.519	.789	7.0	3.6	1.4	.5	10.2
Isaiah Hartenstein	82	8	19.8	.535	.216	.676	6.5	1.2	.6	.8	5.0
Trevor Keels	3	0	2.7	.250	.250	—	.7	.0	.0	.0	1.0
Miles McBride	64	2	11.9	.358	.299	.667	.8	1.1	.6	.1	3.5
Sviatoslav Mykhailiuk	13	0	3.1	.500	.600	.600	.5	.1	.1	.0	1.6
Immanuel Quickley	81	21	28.9	.448	.370	.819	4.2	3.4	1.0	.2	14.9
Julius Randle	77	77	35.5	.459	.343	.757	10.0	4.1	.6	.3	25.1
Cam Reddish	20	8	21.9	.449	.304	.879	1.6	1.0	.8	.4	8.4
Mitchell Robinson	59	58	27.0	.671	—	.484	9.4	.9	.9	1.8	7.4
Derrick Rose	27	0	12.5	.384	.302	.917	1.5	1.7	.3	.2	5.6
Jericho Sims	52	16	15.6	.776	.000	.750	4.7	.5	.3	.5	3.4
Obi Toppin	67	5	15.7	.446	.344	.809	2.8	1.0	.3	.2	7.4

=== Playoff statistics ===
As of May 12, 2023

New York Knicks statistics
Player	GP	GS	MPG	FG%	3P%	FT%	RPG	APG	SPG	BPG	PPG
RJ Barrett	11	11	34.3	.433	.328	.769	4.5	2.8	.8	.2	19.3
Jalen Brunson	11	11	40.3	.474	.325	.912	4.9	5.6	1.5	.1	27.8
Quentin Grimes	9	6	26.9	.304	.243	.818	2.8	1.4	1.0	.6	5.1
Josh Hart	11	5	32.1	.479	.313	.636	7.4	2.2	.8	.3	10.4
Isaiah Hartenstein	11	0	20.0	.478	—	.750	4.6	1.3	.8	1.4	3.1
DaQuan Jeffries	2	0	2.5	—	—	—	.0	.0	.0	.0	.0
Miles McBride	8	0	2.5	.250	.333	—	.3	.1	.0	.1	.4
Immanuel Quickley	8	0	21.9	.348	.243	.850	1.6	1.0	.5	.0	9.0
Julius Randle	10	10	33.0	.374	.258	.709	8.3	3.6	.5	.3	16.6
Mitchell Robinson	11	11	27.1	.604	—	.394	9.3	.8	.6	1.5	6.5
Derrick Rose	1	0	3.0	.000	.000	—	.0	1.0	.0	.0	.0
Obi Toppin	11	1	15.9	.429	.302	.800	3.5	.6	.7	.3	7.0

== Transactions ==
=== Trades ===
June 23, 2022	To New York Knicks 2023 first round pick 2023 first round pick 2023 first round pick	To Oklahoma City Thunder Draft rights to Ousmane Dieng
July 6, 2022	To New York Knicks 2025 first round pick	To Charlotte Hornets 2023 first round pick 2023 second round pick 2023 second round pick 2023 second round pick 2024 second round pick
July 6, 2022	To Detroit Pistons Kemba Walker; Draft rights to Jalen Duren	
July 11, 2022	To New York Knicks Draft rights to Nikola Radičević; Protected 2025 second round pick	To Detroit Pistons Alec Burks; Nerlens Noel; 2023 second round pick 2026 second round pick Cash considerations
February 9, 2023	To New York Knicks Josh Hart; Draft rights to Dani Díez; Draft rights to Bojan Dubljević	To Charlotte Hornets Sviatoslav Mykhailiuk; 2023 second round pick 2027 second round pick
February 9, 2023	To Philadelphia 76ers Jalen McDaniels; 2024 second round pick 2029 second round pick	To Portland Trail Blazers Ryan Arcidiacono; Cam Reddish; Matisse Thybulle; Protected 2023 first round pick Draft rights to Ante Tomić

=== Additions ===
Date	Player	Former team	Ref
July 12, 2022	Jalen Brunson	Dallas Mavericks	
July 12, 2022	Isaiah Hartenstein	Los Angeles Clippers	
September 15, 2022	DaQuan Jeffries	College Park Skyhawks	
September 18, 2022	Sviatoslav Mykhailiuk	Toronto Raptors	
September 21, 2022	Quinton Rose	Westchester Knicks	
September 21, 2022	M. J. Walker	Westchester Knicks	
September 23, 2022	Garrison Brooks	Mississippi State Bulldogs	
September 23, 2022	Nuni Omot	Leones de Ponce	
September 25, 2022	Jalen Harris	Scarborough Shooting Stars	
October 14, 2022	James Akinjo	Baylor Bears	
November 29, 2022	DaQuan Jeffries	Westchester Knicks	
February 28, 2023	Duane Washington Jr.	Phoenix Suns	
March 5, 2023	DaQuan Jeffries	—	
March 8, 2023	Moses Brown	Los Angeles Clippers	
March 12, 2023	Trevor Keels	Westchester Knicks	
March 16, 2023	DaQuan Jeffries	—	
March 26, 2023	DaQuan Jeffries	—	
April 9, 2023	Isaiah Roby	San Antonio Spurs	

=== Subtractions ===
Date	Player	New team	Ref
July 8, 2022	Taj Gibson	Washington Wizards	
September 23, 2022	Quinton Rose	Westchester Knicks	
September 23, 2022	M. J. Walker	Westchester Knicks	
September 25, 2022	Garrison Brooks	Westchester Knicks	
September 25, 2022	Nuni Omot	Westchester Knicks	
October 15, 2022	James Akinjo	Westchester Knicks	
October 15, 2022	Jalen Harris	Westchester Knicks	
October 15, 2022	DaQuan Jeffries	Westchester Knicks	
November 29, 2022	Feron Hunt	Westchester Knicks	
March 5, 2023	Trevor Keels	Westchester Knicks	
March 12, 2023	Moses Brown	Brooklyn Nets	
