= 2022–23 Philadelphia 76ers season =

2022–23 NBA season by team

- Head coach: Doc Rivers
- President: Daryl Morey
- General manager: Elton Brand
- Owner: Josh Harris
- Arena: Wells Fargo Center

Results
- Record: 54–28 (.659)
- Place: Division: 2nd (Atlantic); Conference: 3rd (Eastern)
- Playoff finish: Conference semifinals (lost to Celtics 3–4)
- Stats at Basketball Reference

Local media
- Television: NBCSPHI, NBCSPHI+, 6ABC
- Radio: WPEN

The 2022–23 Philadelphia 76ers season was the 74th season for the franchise in the National Basketball Association (NBA).

The 76ers led the NBA in both free throw percentage (83.5%) and three-point field goal percentage (38.7%) during the regular season. Philadelphia clinched a playoff spot on March 21, when the Cleveland Cavaliers beat the Brooklyn Nets. On April 22, the Philadelphia 76ers swept the Brooklyn Nets in the first round of the 2023 NBA playoffs, following a 96–88 victory.

They were eliminated in the Eastern Conference semifinals for the third consecutive season and for the fifth time in the past six seasons by the Boston Celtics after being defeated by a score of 112–88 in game 7 of the series.

This was Doc Rivers' last season with the team as head coach; the 76ers fired him on May 16, 2023.

== Draft ==
Round	Pick	Player	Position(s)	Nationality	College / Club
1	23	David Roddy	Guard	United States	Colorado State

The 76ers entered the draft holding their first round pick. They owe two second-round picks at 50th to the Minnesota Timberwolves that the Denver Nuggets previously owned and at 51st to the Golden State Warriors that the Toronto Raptors previously owned. They initially owed another second-round pick to the Miami Heat that they initially acquired from the Nuggets, but the pick was forfeited after the league found that the Heat violated tampering rules with Kyle Lowry in free agency.

== Roster ==
2022–23 Philadelphia 76ers roster
Players

Pos.	No.	Player	Height	Weight	DOB	From
C	14	Dewayne Dedmon	7 ft 0 in (2.13 m)	245 lb (111 kg)	1989-08-12	USC
C	21	Joel Embiid (C)	7 ft 0 in (2.13 m)	280 lb (127 kg)	1994-03-16	Kansas
G	1	James Harden	6 ft 5 in (1.96 m)	220 lb (100 kg)	1989-08-26	Arizona State
F/C	5	Montrezl Harrell	6 ft 8 in (2.03 m)	240 lb (109 kg)	1994-01-26	Louisville
F	12	Tobias Harris	6 ft 9 in (2.06 m)	226 lb (103 kg)	1992-07-15	Tennessee
F	25	Danuel Jr. House	6 ft 6 in (1.98 m)	220 lb (100 kg)	1993-06-07	Texas A&M
F	23	Louis King (TW)	6 ft 7 in (2.01 m)	205 lb (93 kg)	1999-04-06	Oregon
G/F	30	Furkan Korkmaz	6 ft 7 in (2.01 m)	202 lb (92 kg)	1997-07-24	Turkey
G	0	Tyrese Maxey	6 ft 2 in (1.88 m)	200 lb (91 kg)	2000-10-04	Kentucky
G	9	Mac McClung (TW)	6 ft 2 in (1.88 m)	185 lb (84 kg)	1999-01-06	Texas Tech
F	7	Jalen McDaniels	6 ft 9 in (2.06 m)	205 lb (93 kg)	1998-01-31	San Diego State
G	8	De'Anthony Melton	6 ft 2 in (1.88 m)	200 lb (91 kg)	1998-05-28	USC
G	18	Shake Milton	6 ft 5 in (1.96 m)	205 lb (93 kg)	1996-09-26	SMU
F	20	Georges Niang	6 ft 7 in (2.01 m)	230 lb (104 kg)	1993-06-17	Iowa State
F	44	Paul Reed	6 ft 9 in (2.06 m)	210 lb (95 kg)	1999-06-26	DePaul
G	11	Jaden Springer	6 ft 3 in (1.91 m)	202 lb (92 kg)	2002-09-25	Tennessee
F	17	P. J. Tucker	6 ft 5 in (1.96 m)	245 lb (111 kg)	1985-05-05	Texas

Coaches
Head coach
- Doc Rivers
Assistant(s)
- Brian Adams
- Dan Burke
- Sam Cassell
- Eric Hughes
- Dave Joerger
- Jamie Young

Legend
- (DP) Unsigned draft pick
- (FA) Free agent
- (S) Suspended
- (GL) On assignment to G League affiliate
- (TW) Two-way affiliate player
- Injured

Roster
Updated: April 7, 2023

== Standings ==
=== Division ===
Atlantic Division	W	L	PCT	GB	Home	Road	Div	GP
y – Boston Celtics	57	25	.695	–	32‍–‍9	25‍–‍16	11–5	82
x – Philadelphia 76ers	54	28	.659	3.0	29‍–‍12	25‍–‍16	10–6	82
x – New York Knicks	47	35	.573	10.0	23‍–‍18	24‍–‍17	8–8	82
x – Brooklyn Nets	45	37	.549	12.0	23‍–‍18	22‍–‍19	7–9	82
pi – Toronto Raptors	41	41	.500	16.0	27‍–‍14	14‍–‍27	4–12	82

=== Conference ===
Eastern Conference
#	Team	W	L	PCT	GB	GP
1	z – Milwaukee Bucks *	58	24	.707	–	82
2	y – Boston Celtics *	57	25	.695	1.0	82
3	x – Philadelphia 76ers	54	28	.659	4.0	82
4	x – Cleveland Cavaliers	51	31	.622	7.0	82
5	x – New York Knicks	47	35	.573	11.0	82
6	x – Brooklyn Nets	45	37	.549	13.0	82
7	y – Miami Heat *	44	38	.537	14.0	82
8	x – Atlanta Hawks	41	41	.500	17.0	82
9	pi – Toronto Raptors	41	41	.500	17.0	82
10	pi – Chicago Bulls	40	42	.488	18.0	82
11	Indiana Pacers	35	47	.427	23.0	82
12	Washington Wizards	35	47	.427	23.0	82
13	Orlando Magic	34	48	.415	24.0	82
14	Charlotte Hornets	27	55	.329	31.0	82
15	Detroit Pistons	17	65	.207	41.0	82

== Game log ==
=== Preseason ===
2022 preseason game log
Total: 4–0 (home: 2–0; road: 2–0)
Preseason: 4–0 (home: 2–0; road: 2–0)

Game	Date	Team	Score	High points	High rebounds	High assists	Location Attendance	Record
1	October 3	@ Brooklyn	W 127–108	Tyrese Maxey (20)	Charles Bassey (9)	Harris, Korkmaz (4)	Barclays Center; 13,250	1–0
2	October 5	Cleveland	W 113–112	Tyrese Maxey (21)	Embiid, Korkmaz, Reed (6)	Harden, Milton (5)	Wells Fargo Center; 19,793	2–0
3	October 10	@ Cleveland	W 113–97	Tyrese Maxey (19)	Tobias Harris (7)	De'Anthony Melton (5)	Rocket Mortgage FieldHouse; 13,648	3–0
4	October 12	Charlotte	W 99–94	Joel Embiid (19)	Embiid, Harrell (6)	James Harden (5)	Wells Fargo Center; 19,778	4–0

2022–23 preseason schedule

=== Regular season ===
2022–23 game log
Total: 54–28 (home: 29–12; road: 25–16)
October: 4–4 (home: 1–2; road: 3–2)

Game	Date	Team	Score	High points	High rebounds	High assists	Location Attendance	Record
1	October 18	@ Boston	L 117–126	James Harden (35)	Joel Embiid (15)	James Harden (7)	TD Garden; 19,156	0–1
2	October 20	Milwaukee	L 88–90	James Harden (31)	Joel Embiid (12)	James Harden (9)	Wells Fargo Center; 20,060	0–2
3	October 22	San Antonio	L 105–114	Joel Embiid (40)	Joel Embiid (13)	James Harden (12)	Wells Fargo Center; 19,822	0–3
4	October 24	Indiana	W 120–106	James Harden (29)	James Harden (9)	James Harden (11)	Wells Fargo Center; 19,786	1–3
5	October 26	@ Toronto	L 109–119	Embiid, Maxey (31)	Tobias Harris (8)	James Harden (9)	Scotiabank Arena; 19,800	1–4
6	October 28	@ Toronto	W 112–90	Tyrese Maxey (44)	Tyrese Maxey (8)	De'Anthony Melton (6)	Scotiabank Arena; 19,800	2–4
7	October 29	@ Chicago	W 114–109	Joel Embiid (25)	Joel Embiid (7)	James Harden (11)	United Center; 19,010	3–4
8	October 31	@ Washington	W 118–111	Tyrese Maxey (28)	James Harden (7)	James Harden (17)	Capital One Arena; 13,746	4–4

November: 8–6 (home: 6–3; road: 2–3)

Game	Date	Team	Score	High points	High rebounds	High assists	Location Attendance	Record
9	November 2	Washington	L 111–121	Tyrese Maxey (32)	Tobias Harris (9)	James Harden (10)	Wells Fargo Center; 19,855	4–5
10	November 4	New York	L 104–106	Tyrese Maxey (31)	Tobias Harris (9)	De'Anthony Melton (9)	Wells Fargo Center; 20,679	4–6
11	November 7	Phoenix	W 100–88	Joel Embiid (33)	Joel Embiid (10)	Harris, Maxey (6)	Wells Fargo Center; 20,347	5–6
12	November 10	@ Atlanta	L 95–104	Joel Embiid (26)	Joel Embiid (13)	Tyrese Maxey (5)	State Farm Arena; 16,066	5–7
13	November 12	Atlanta	W 121–109	Joel Embiid (42)	Joel Embiid (10)	Tyrese Maxey (9)	Wells Fargo Center; 20,245	6–7
14	November 13	Utah	W 105–98	Joel Embiid (59)	Joel Embiid (11)	Joel Embiid (8)	Wells Fargo Center; 19,761	7–7
15	November 18	Milwaukee	W 110–102	Joel Embiid (32)	Joel Embiid (11)	Joel Embiid (8)	Wells Fargo Center; 19,769	8–7
16	November 19	Minnesota	L 109–112	Joel Embiid (32)	Joel Embiid (9)	Embiid, Melton (6)	Wells Fargo Center; 20,515	8–8
17	November 22	Brooklyn	W 115–106	Tobias Harris (24)	Paul Reed (10)	Shake Milton (5)	Wells Fargo Center; 20,184	9–8
18	November 23	@ Charlotte	L 101–107	Shake Milton (22)	Paul Reed (8)	Shake Milton (9)	Spectrum Center; 16,910	9–9
19	November 25	@ Orlando	W 107–99	Shake Milton (24)	Tobias Harris (10)	Shake Milton (10)	Amway Center; 15,384	10–9
20	November 27	@ Orlando	W 133–103	Shake Milton (29)	Paul Reed (13)	Shake Milton (7)	Amway Center; 16,218	11–9
21	November 28	Atlanta	W 104–101	Joel Embiid (30)	Tobias Harris (10)	Embiid, Milton (7)	Wells Fargo Center; 19,778	12–9
22	November 30	@ Cleveland	L 85–113	Joel Embiid (19)	Joel Embiid (6)	Joel Embiid (6)	Rocket Mortgage FieldHouse; 19,432	12–10

December: 9–4 (home: 7–0; road: 2–4)

Game	Date	Team	Score	High points	High rebounds	High assists	Location Attendance	Record
23	December 2	@ Memphis	L 109–117	Joel Embiid (35)	Joel Embiid (12)	Joel Embiid (8)	FedExForum; 17,022	12–11
24	December 5	@ Houston	L 123–132 (2OT)	Joel Embiid (39)	De'Anthony Melton (8)	James Harden (7)	Toyota Center; 15,331	12–12
25	December 9	L.A. Lakers	W 133–122 (OT)	Joel Embiid (38)	Joel Embiid (12)	James Harden (12)	Wells Fargo Center; 20,852	13–12
26	December 11	Charlotte	W 131–113	Joel Embiid (53)	Joel Embiid (12)	James Harden (16)	Wells Fargo Center; 19,765	14–12
27	December 13	Sacramento	W 123–103	Joel Embiid (31)	Embiid, Harden, Harris (7)	James Harden (15)	Wells Fargo Center; 19,768	15–12
28	December 16	Golden State	W 118–106	Joel Embiid (34)	Joel Embiid (13)	James Harden (9)	Wells Fargo Center; 20,567	16–12
29	December 19	Toronto	W 104–101 (OT)	Joel Embiid (28)	Joel Embiid (11)	James Harden (8)	Wells Fargo Center; 20,408	17–12
30	December 21	Detroit	W 113–93	Joel Embiid (22)	Embiid, Tucker (10)	James Harden (8)	Wells Fargo Center; 20,615	18–12
31	December 23	L.A. Clippers	W 119–114	Joel Embiid (44)	James Harden (11)	James Harden (21)	Wells Fargo Center; 19,996	19–12
32	December 25	@ New York	W 119–112	Joel Embiid (35)	Joel Embiid (8)	James Harden (13)	Madison Square Garden; 19,812	20–12
33	December 27	@ Washington	L 111–116	Joel Embiid (48)	Joel Embiid (10)	James Harden (13)	Capital One Arena; 20,476	20–13
34	December 30	@ New Orleans	L 116–127	Joel Embiid (37)	Joel Embiid (8)	James Harden (10)	Smoothie King Center; 18,656	20–14
35	December 31	@ Oklahoma City	W 115–96	Tobias Harris (23)	Joel Embiid (13)	Joel Embiid (10)	Paycom Center; 17,147	21–14

January: 11–3 (home: 5–3; road: 6–0)

Game	Date	Team	Score	High points	High rebounds	High assists	Location Attendance	Record
36	January 2	New Orleans	W 120–111	Joel Embiid (42)	Joel Embiid (11)	James Harden (8)	Wells Fargo Center; 20,531	22–14
37	January 4	Indiana	W 129–126 (OT)	James Harden (26)	Tobias Harris (10)	James Harden (8)	Wells Fargo Center; 20,033	23–14
38	January 6	Chicago	L 112–126	Tyrese Maxey (26)	Tobias Harris (11)	James Harden (11)	Wells Fargo Center; 20,766	23–15
39	January 8	@ Detroit	W 123–111	Tyrese Maxey (23)	Paul Reed (12)	James Harden (11)	Little Caesars Arena; 18,898	24–15
40	January 10	Detroit	W 147–116	Joel Embiid (36)	James Harden (12)	James Harden (15)	Wells Fargo Center; 20,221	25–15
41	January 12	Oklahoma City	L 114–133	Joel Embiid (30)	Joel Embiid (10)	James Harden (15)	Wells Fargo Center; 20,892	25–16
42	January 14	@ Utah	W 118–117	Joel Embiid (30)	Joel Embiid (7)	James Harden (11)	Vivint Arena; 18,206	26–16
43	January 15	@ L.A. Lakers	W 113–112	Joel Embiid (35)	Joel Embiid (11)	James Harden (13)	Crypto.com Arena; 18,020	27–16
44	January 17	@ L.A. Clippers	W 120–110	Joel Embiid (40)	Joel Embiid (9)	James Harden (9)	Crypto.com Arena; 15,155	28–16
45	January 19	@ Portland	W 105–95	Joel Embiid (32)	James Harden (10)	James Harden (14)	Moda Center; 18,113	29–16
46	January 21	@ Sacramento	W 129–127	Tyrese Maxey (32)	Harrell, Melton (7)	Shake Milton (7)	Golden 1 Center; 17,861	30–16
47	January 25	Brooklyn	W 137–133	Tyrese Maxey (27)	Joel Embiid (10)	James Harden (7)	Wells Fargo Center; 19,772	31–16
48	January 28	Denver	W 126–119	Joel Embiid (47)	Joel Embiid (18)	James Harden (13)	Wells Fargo Center; 21,255	32–16
49	January 30	Orlando	L 109–119	Joel Embiid (30)	Joel Embiid (11)	Joel Embiid (5)	Wells Fargo Center; 19,812	32–17

February: 7–4 (home: 5–2; road: 2–2)

Game	Date	Team	Score	High points	High rebounds	High assists	Location Attendance	Record
50	February 1	Orlando	W 105–94	Joel Embiid (28)	Joel Embiid (11)	James Harden (10)	Wells Fargo Center; 20,885	33–17
51	February 3	@ San Antonio	W 137–125	Joel Embiid (33)	Joel Embiid (10)	James Harden (8)	AT&T Center; 15,252	34–17
52	February 5	@ New York	L 97–108	Joel Embiid (31)	Joel Embiid (14)	James Harden (12)	Madison Square Garden; 17,586	34–18
53	February 8	@ Boston	L 99–106	Joel Embiid (28)	Joel Embiid (7)	James Harden (11)	TD Garden; 19,156	34–19
54	February 10	New York	W 119–108	Joel Embiid (35)	Joel Embiid (11)	James Harden (12)	Wells Fargo Center; 21,057	35–19
55	February 11	@ Brooklyn	W 101–98	Joel Embiid (37)	Joel Embiid (13)	James Harden (6)	Barclays Center; 17,732	36–19
56	February 13	Houston	W 123–104	James Harden (28)	Embiid, Harris (6)	James Harden (10)	Wells Fargo Center; 19,850	37–19
57	February 15	Cleveland	W 118–112	Joel Embiid (29)	Joel Embiid (14)	James Harden (12)	Wells Fargo Center; 21,134	38–19
58	February 23	Memphis	W 110–105	James Harden (31)	Joel Embiid (19)	James Harden (7)	Wells Fargo Center; 21,205	39–19
59	February 25	Boston	L 107–110	Joel Embiid (41)	P. J. Tucker (16)	James Harden (8)	Wells Fargo Center; 20,993	39–20
60	February 27	Miami	L 99–101	Joel Embiid (27)	Joel Embiid (12)	James Harden (12)	Wells Fargo Center; 20,859	39–21

March: 12–5 (home: 5–1; road: 7–4)

Game	Date	Team	Score	High points	High rebounds	High assists	Location Attendance	Record
61	March 1	@ Miami	W 119–96	Tyrese Maxey (27)	Paul Reed (14)	Tyrese Maxey (7)	Miami-Dade Arena; 19,600	40–21
62	March 2	@ Dallas	L 126–133	Joel Embiid (35)	Joel Embiid (8)	James Harden (13)	American Airlines Center; 20,002	40–22
63	March 4	@ Milwaukee	W 133–130	James Harden (38)	James Harden (9)	Embiid, Harden (10)	Fiserv Forum; 18,100	41–22
64	March 6	@ Indiana	W 147–143	Joel Embiid (42)	James Harden (9)	James Harden (20)	Gainbridge Fieldhouse; 15,008	42–22
65	March 7	@ Minnesota	W 117–94	Joel Embiid (39)	Tobias Harris (14)	Maxey, Milton (5)	Target Center; 17,136	43–22
66	March 10	Portland	W 120–119	Joel Embiid (39)	James Harden (9)	James Harden (8)	Wells Fargo Center; 21,001	44–22
67	March 12	Washington	W 112–93	Joel Embiid (34)	Joel Embiid (8)	James Harden (14)	Wells Fargo Center; 21,220	45–22
68	March 15	@ Cleveland	W 118–109	Joel Embiid (36)	Joel Embiid (18)	James Harden (12)	Rocket Mortgage FieldHouse; 19,432	46–22
69	March 17	@ Charlotte	W 121–82	Joel Embiid (38)	Joel Embiid (13)	James Harden (10)	Spectrum Center; 19,096	47–22
70	March 18	@ Indiana	W 141–121	Embiid, Maxey (31)	Joel Embiid (7)	Embiid, Maxey (7)	Gainbridge Fieldhouse; 17,274	48–22
71	March 20	Chicago	L 105–109 (2OT)	Joel Embiid (37)	Joel Embiid (16)	James Harden (12)	Wells Fargo Center; 21,145	48–23
72	March 22	@ Chicago	W 116–91	De'Anthony Melton (25)	Tobias Harris (9)	Tobias Harris (8)	United Center; 20,946	49–23
73	March 24	@ Golden State	L 112–120	Joel Embiid (46)	Joel Embiid (9)	Joel Embiid (8)	Chase Center; 18,064	49–24
74	March 25	@ Phoenix	L 105–125	Joel Embiid (28)	Joel Embiid (10)	Shake Milton (6)	Footprint Center; 17,071	49–25
75	March 27	@ Denver	L 111–116	Tyrese Maxey (29)	Paul Reed (9)	Tyrese Maxey (5)	Ball Arena; 19,781	49–26
76	March 29	Dallas	W 116–108	Joel Embiid (25)	Joel Embiid (9)	James Harden (12)	Wells Fargo Center; 20,583	50–26
77	March 31	Toronto	W 117–110	Joel Embiid (25)	Joel Embiid (12)	James Harden (11)	Wells Fargo Center; 20,993	51–26

April : 3–2 (home: 2–1; road: 1–1)

Game	Date	Team	Score	High points	High rebounds	High assists	Location Attendance	Record
78	April 2	@ Milwaukee	L 104–117	Tyrese Maxey (29)	Paul Reed (10)	James Harden (6)	Fiserv Forum; 17,532	51–27
79	April 4	Boston	W 103–101	Joel Embiid (52)	Joel Embiid (13)	James Harden (10)	Wells Fargo Center; 21,104	52–27
80	April 6	Miami	L 101–129	Joel Embiid (21)	Joel Embiid (6)	Shake Milton (10)	Wells Fargo Center; 21,178	52–28
81	April 7	@ Atlanta	W 136–131 (OT)	McDaniels, Niang (24)	Jalen McDaniels (11)	Shake Milton (16)	State Farm Arena; 17,627	53–28
82	April 9	@ Brooklyn	W 134–105	King, McClung, Milton (20)	Paul Reed (10)	Mac McClung (9)	Barclays Center; 17,732	54–28

2022–23 season schedule

=== Playoffs ===
2023 playoff game log
Total: 7–4 (home: 3–2; road: 4–2)
First Round: 4–0 (home: 2–0; road: 2–0)

Game	Date	Team	Score	High points	High rebounds	High assists	Location Attendance	Series
1	April 15	Brooklyn	W 121–101	Joel Embiid (26)	P. J. Tucker (7)	James Harden (13)	Wells Fargo Center; 20,913	1–0
2	April 17	Brooklyn	W 96–84	Tyrese Maxey (33)	Joel Embiid (19)	Embiid, Harden (7)	Wells Fargo Center; 20,958	2–0
3	April 20	@ Brooklyn	W 102–97	Tyrese Maxey (25)	Joel Embiid (10)	Harden, Tucker (4)	Barclays Center; 17,910	3–0
4	April 22	@ Brooklyn	W 96–88	Tobias Harris (25)	Paul Reed (15)	James Harden (11)	Barclays Center; 18,037	4–0

Conference Semifinals: 3–4 (home: 1–2; road: 2–2)

Game	Date	Team	Score	High points	High rebounds	High assists	Location Attendance	Series
1	May 1	@ Boston	W 119–115	James Harden (45)	Paul Reed (13)	James Harden (6)	TD Garden; 19,156	1–0
2	May 3	@ Boston	L 87–121	Tobias Harris (16)	James Harden (10)	James Harden (4)	TD Garden; 19,156	1–1
3	May 5	Boston	L 102–114	Joel Embiid (30)	Joel Embiid (13)	James Harden (11)	Wells Fargo Center; 21,290	1–2
4	May 7	Boston	W 116–115 (OT)	James Harden (42)	Joel Embiid (13)	James Harden (9)	Wells Fargo Center; 21,264	2–2
5	May 9	@ Boston	W 115–103	Joel Embiid (33)	Tobias Harris (11)	James Harden (10)	TD Garden; 19,156	3–2
6	May 11	Boston	L 86–95	Embiid, Maxey (26)	Joel Embiid (10)	James Harden (9)	Wells Fargo Center; 21,337	3–3
7	May 14	@ Boston	L 88–112	Tobias Harris (19)	Joel Embiid (8)	James Harden (7)	TD Garden; 19,156	3–4

2023 playoff schedule

== Player statistics ==
Legend
GP	Games played	GS	Games started	MPG	Minutes per game
FG%	Field-goal percentage	3P%	3-point field-goal percentage	FT%	Free-throw percentage
RPG	Rebounds per game	APG	Assists per game	SPG	Steals per game
BPG	Blocks per game	PPG	Points per game

=== Regular season ===
Philadelphia 76ers statistics
Player	GP	GS	MPG	FG%	3P%	FT%	RPG	APG	SPG	BPG	PPG
Georges Niang	78	1	19.4	.442	.401	.867	2.4	1.0	.4	.2	8.2
De'Anthony Melton	77	58	27.9	.425	.390	.793	4.1	2.6	1.6	.5	10.1
Shake Milton	76	11	20.6	.479	.378	.853	2.5	3.2	.3	.2	8.4
P. J. Tucker	75	75	25.6	.427	.393	.826	3.9	.8	.5	.2	3.5
Tobias Harris	74	74	32.9	.501	.389	.876	5.7	2.5	.9	.5	14.7
Paul Reed	69	2	10.9	.593	.167	.745	3.8	.4	.7	.7	4.2
Joel Embiid	66	66	34.6	.548	.330	.857	10.2	4.2	1.0	1.7	33.1
Tyrese Maxey	60	41	33.6	.481	.434	.845	2.9	3.5	.8	.1	20.3
James Harden	58	58	36.8	.441	.385	.867	6.1	10.7	1.2	.5	21.0
Montrezl Harrell	57	7	11.9	.598	.000	.693	2.8	.6	.3	.4	5.6
Danuel House Jr.	56	5	14.4	.472	.336	.750	1.7	.8	.3	.2	4.8
Matisse Thybulle^{†}	49	6	12.1	.431	.333	.750	1.3	.5	.9	.3	2.7
Furkan Korkmaz	37	0	9.5	.432	.391	.722	1.1	.6	.3	.1	3.8
Jalen McDaniels^{†}	24	3	17.5	.488	.400	.824	3.2	.8	.7	.2	6.7
Jaden Springer	16	2	5.6	.486	.400	.750	.9	.5	.4	.2	2.6
Dewayne Dedmon^{†}	8	1	9.5	.591	.500	.200	3.1	1.3	.3	.6	3.5
Mac McClung	2	0	20.5	.450	.364	.600	5.0	4.5	.0	.0	12.5
Saben Lee^{†}	2	0	5.0	.750	.000		.0	1.0	.5	.0	3.0
Julian Champagnie^{†}	2	0	3.5	.000	.000		.0	.0	.5	.0	.0
Louis King	1	0	29.0	.615	.500	.000	4.0	2.0	1.0	.0	20.0
Michael Foster Jr.	1	0	1.0				.0	.0	.0	.0	.0

=== Playoffs ===
Philadelphia 76ers statistics
Player	GP	GS	MPG	FG%	3P%	FT%	RPG	APG	SPG	BPG	PPG
James Harden	11	11	38.8	.393	.378	.873	6.2	8.3	1.8	.4	25.3
Tyrese Maxey	11	11	38.5	.427	.400	.903	4.8	2.3	1.4	.5	20.5
Tobias Harris	11	11	35.6	.522	.366	.867	7.3	1.6	.6	.5	15.3
P. J. Tucker	11	11	26.7	.373	.350	.667	4.5	1.5	1.2	.3	4.9
Paul Reed	11	2	14.3	.579		1.000	5.5	.6	.5	.4	4.6
De'Anthony Melton	11	0	24.9	.383	.388	.750	3.3	1.6	1.2	.8	7.9
Georges Niang	11	0	14.3	.500	.462		.4	.2	.0	.2	4.4
Joel Embiid	9	9	37.3	.431	.179	.905	9.8	2.7	.7	2.8	23.7
Jalen McDaniels	8	0	12.8	.400	.333		2.0	.6	.1	.0	2.4
Danuel House Jr.	7	0	6.0	.429	.100	1.000	1.7	.1	.0	.0	2.9
Shake Milton	6	0	3.5	.600	.000	1.000	.5	.3	.3	.0	1.3
Jaden Springer	4	0	4.3	1.000		.500	.0	.0	.3	.0	2.3
Furkan Korkmaz	3	0	3.7	.000	.000	1.000	.3	.3	.0	.0	.7
Montrezl Harrell	2	0	3.5	.000			.5	.0	.0	.0	.0
Dewayne Dedmon	1	0	5.0	.000	.000		1.0	.0	.0	.0	.0

- ^{†} Denotes player spent time with another team in the season. Stats reflect time with the 76ers only.

== Transactions ==
=== Trades ===
June 24, 2022	To Philadelphia 76ers De'Anthony Melton	To Memphis Grizzlies Danny Green; Draft rights to David Roddy (No. 23)
February 9, 2023	Four-team trade
February 9, 2023	To Philadelphia 76ers Jalen McDaniels; 2024 CHA second-round pick 2029 POR second-round pick	To Portland Trail Blazers Cam Reddish; Matisse Thybulle; Ryan Arcidiacono; 2023 NYK protected first-round pick
February 9, 2023	To Charlotte Hornets Svi Mykhailiuk; 2023 PHI second-round pick 2027 POR second-round pick	To New York Knicks Josh Hart

=== Free agency ===
==== Re-signed ====
Date	Player	Ref.
July 27	James Harden	

==== Additions ====
Date	Player	Former team	Ref.
July 2	Julian Champagnie	St. John's	
July 6	Danuel House	Utah Jazz	
July 6	P. J. Tucker	Miami Heat	
July 10	Michael Foster Jr.	NBA G League Ignite	
September 13	Montrezl Harrell	Charlotte Hornets	

==== Subtractions ====
Date	Player	Reason left	New team	Ref.
July 12	DeAndre Jordan	Free agency	Denver Nuggets	
October 13	Isaiah Joe	Waived	Oklahoma City Thunder	
October 13	Charles Bassey	Waived		
