= Edmond Sumner =

American basketball player (born 1995)

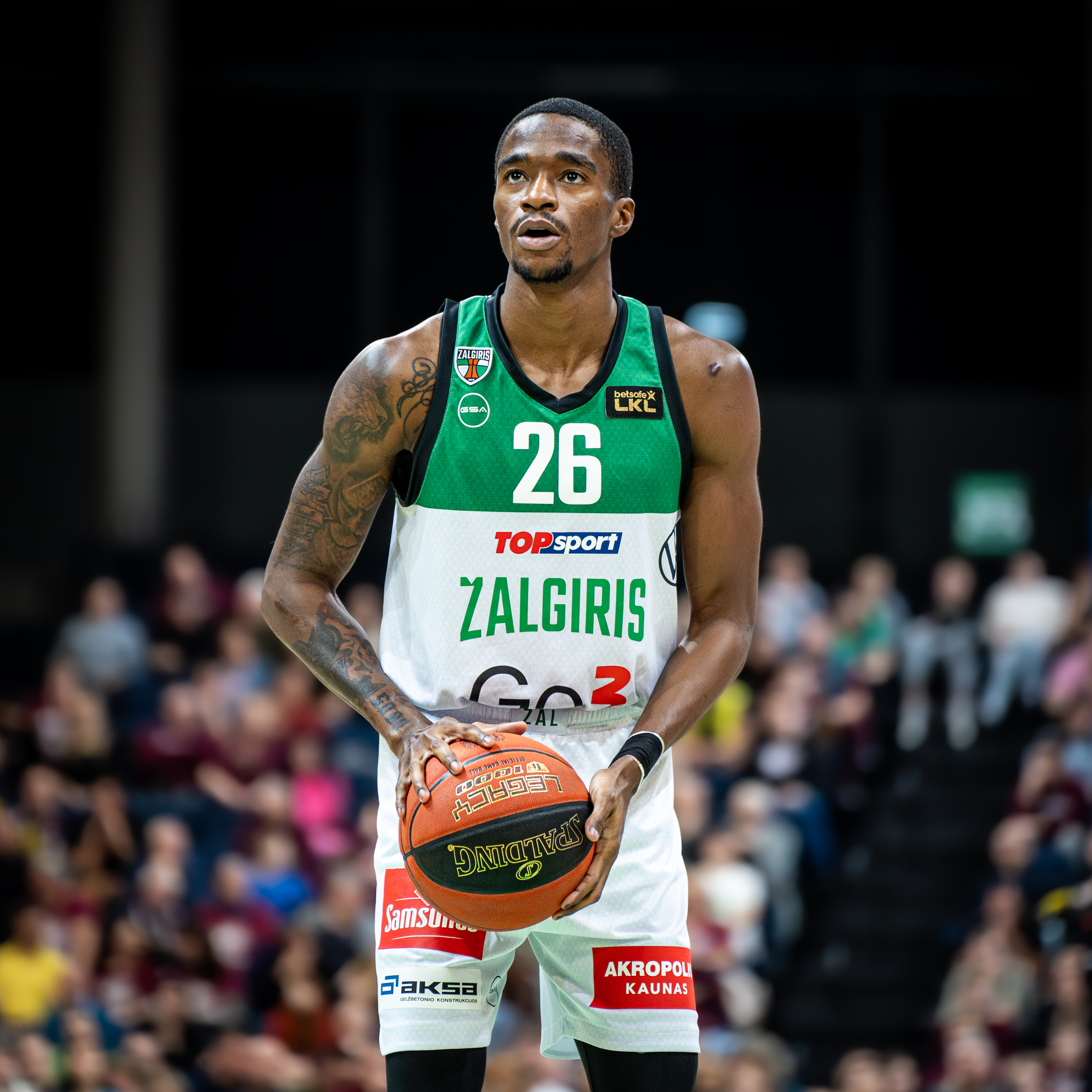
- Sumner with Žalgiris Kaunas in 2024

No. 1 – Guangdong Southern Tigers
- Position: Point guard / shooting guard
- League: CBA

Personal information
- Born: December 31, 1995 (age 30) Detroit, Michigan, U.S.
- Listed height: 6 ft 5 in (1.96 m)
- Listed weight: 196 lb (89 kg)

Career information
- High school: Detroit Country Day (Beverly Hills, Michigan)
- College: Xavier (2014–2017)
- NBA draft: 2017: 2nd round, 52nd overall pick
- Drafted by: New Orleans Pelicans
- Playing career: 2017–present

Career history
- 2017–2021: Indiana Pacers
- 2017–2019: →Fort Wayne Mad Ants
- 2022–2023: Brooklyn Nets
- 2023–2024: Žalgiris Kaunas
- 2024–2025: Sichuan Blue Whales
- 2025–present: Guangdong Southern Tigers

Career highlights
- CBA scoring champion (2025); Lithuanian King Mindaugas Cup winner (2024); Second-team All-Big East (2016)
- Stats at NBA.com
- Stats at Basketball Reference

Edmond Byron Sumner (born December 31, 1995) is an American professional basketball player for the Guangdong Southern Tigers of the Chinese Basketball Association (CBA). A point guard, he played college basketball for the Xavier Musketeers and averaged 15.0 points per game as a junior.

== College career ==
Sumner spent three years playing for the Xavier Musketeers (at Xavier University, Cincinnati) from 2014 to 2017. Sumner was sidelined with an injury in an 82–77 win against St. John's in January 2017 and did not play the rest of the season. At that point, he was averaging 14.9 points, 4.9 assists and 4.4 rebounds per game. This was not the first time he had suffered knee issues; his freshman season was cut to just six games as he withdrew from further playing due to chronic tendinitis in his knees. On March 28, 2017, Sumner declared for the 2017 NBA draft.

== Professional career ==
=== Indiana Pacers (2017–2021) ===
On June 23, 2017, Sumner was selected 52nd overall in the 2017 NBA draft by the New Orleans Pelicans, only to be traded to the Indiana Pacers in exchange for cash considerations. Sumner signed a two-way contract with the Pacers on July 5, 2017, becoming the first second round draft pick to sign such a deal. In the 2017–18 season, Sumner struggled for minutes and spent significant time with the Pacers' G-League team, the Fort Wayne Mad Ants.

Sumner's limited minutes continued into the beginning of the 2018–19 season, but when teammate Victor Oladipo suffered a season-ending injury of a quadriceps tendon rupture his playing time increased significantly, and was given his first NBA start, against the Golden State Warriors. On February 11, 2019, Sumner signed a standard NBA contract with the Pacers, which was reported to be a two-year contract.

On July 29, Sumner inked a three-year contract worth $6.48 million with the Pacers after declining his $1.6 million team option in late June.

During the 2020–21 season, Sumner averaged 7.5 points and 1.8 rebounds per game, shooting 52.5 percent from the floor. In April 2021, he posted consecutive 20-point games against the Detroit Pistons and the Orlando Magic. On September 9, 2021, it was announced that Sumner would be sidelined indefinitely with a torn Achilles tendon.

=== Brooklyn Nets (2022–2023) ===
On October 6, 2021, Sumner was traded, alongside a 2025 second-round pick, to the Brooklyn Nets in exchange for the draft rights to Juan Pablo Vaulet. Four days later, he was waived by the Nets.

On July 8, 2022, Sumner re-signed with the Nets.

On July 15, 2023, Sumner was waived by the Nets.

On September 29, 2023, Sumner signed with the Charlotte Hornets, but was waived on October 24.

=== Žalgiris Kaunas (2023–2024) ===
On November 29, 2023, Sumner signed with Žalgiris Kaunas of the Lithuanian Basketball League (LKL) and the EuroLeague.

=== Sichuan Blue Whales (2024–2025) ===
On August 23, 2024, Sumner signed with Sichuan Blue Whales of the Chinese Basketball Association. He led the CBA in scoring in the 2024–25 season, averaging 36 points per game, along with 6.6 rebounds, 6.8 assists and 2.1 steals per contest.

=== Guangdong Southern Tigers (2025–present) ===
November 28, 2025, Sumner joined Guangdong Southern Tigers of the Chinese Basketball Association. On September 22, 2026, he re-signed with the team.

== Career statistics ==
Legend
GP	Games played	GS	Games started	MPG	Minutes per game
FG%	Field goal percentage	3P%	3-point field goal percentage	FT%	Free throw percentage
RPG	Rebounds per game	APG	Assists per game	SPG	Steals per game
BPG	Blocks per game	PPG	Points per game	**Bold**	Career high

=== NBA ===
==== Regular season ====
Year	Team	GP	GS	MPG	FG%	3P%	FT%	RPG	APG	SPG	BPG	PPG
2017–18	Indiana	1	0	2.0	**1.000**	—	—	1.0	.0	.0	.0	2.0
2018–19	Indiana	23	2	9.1	.344	.259	.625	1.0	.4	.5	.2	2.9
2019–20	Indiana	31	3	14.4	.430	.264	.552	1.5	**1.8**	.5	**.3**	4.9
2020–21	Indiana	**53**	**24**	**16.2**	.525	**.398**	.819	**1.8**	.9	**.6**	.2	**7.5**
2022–23	Brooklyn	**53**	12	13.9	.461	.356	**.917**	1.5	1.3	**.6**	.2	7.1
Career		161	41	14.0	.470	.341	.811	1.5	1.1	.6	.2	6.2

==== Playoffs ====
Year	Team	GP	GS	MPG	FG%	3P%	FT%	RPG	APG	SPG	BPG	PPG
2019	Indiana	1	0	1.6	—	—	—	**2.0**	.0	.0	.0	.0
2020	Indiana	**3**	0	**13.5**	**.286**	.000	**1.000**	**2.0**	.0	.0	.0	**2.0**
2023	Brooklyn	1	0	4.5	—	—	—	.0	**1.0**	.0	.0	.0
Career		5	0	9.3	.286	.000	1.000	1.6	.2	.0	.0	1.2

=== EuroLeague ===
Year	Team	GP	GS	MPG	FG%	3P%	FT%	RPG	APG	SPG	BPG	PPG	PIR
2023–24	Žalgiris	23	7	13.4	.438	.393	.811	1.1	1.8	.8	.1	6.9	4.3
Career		23	7	13.4	.438	.393	.811	1.1	1.8	.8	.1	6.9	4.3

=== College ===
Year	Team	GP	GS	MPG	FG%	3P%	FT%	RPG	APG	SPG	BPG	PPG
2014–15	Xavier	6	0	7.2	.200	.000	.667	.8	1.0	.3	.0	1.3
2015–16	Xavier	**31**	**29**	25.9	.397	**.301**	.727	3.4	3.6	**1.3**	.2	11.0
2016–17	Xavier	22	19	**31.7**	**.479**	.273	**.735**	**4.1**	**4.8**	1.2	**.7**	**14.3**
Career		59	48	26.1	.429	.285	.730	3.4	3.8	1.2	.4	11.2
