= Dru Smith =

American basketball player (born 1997)

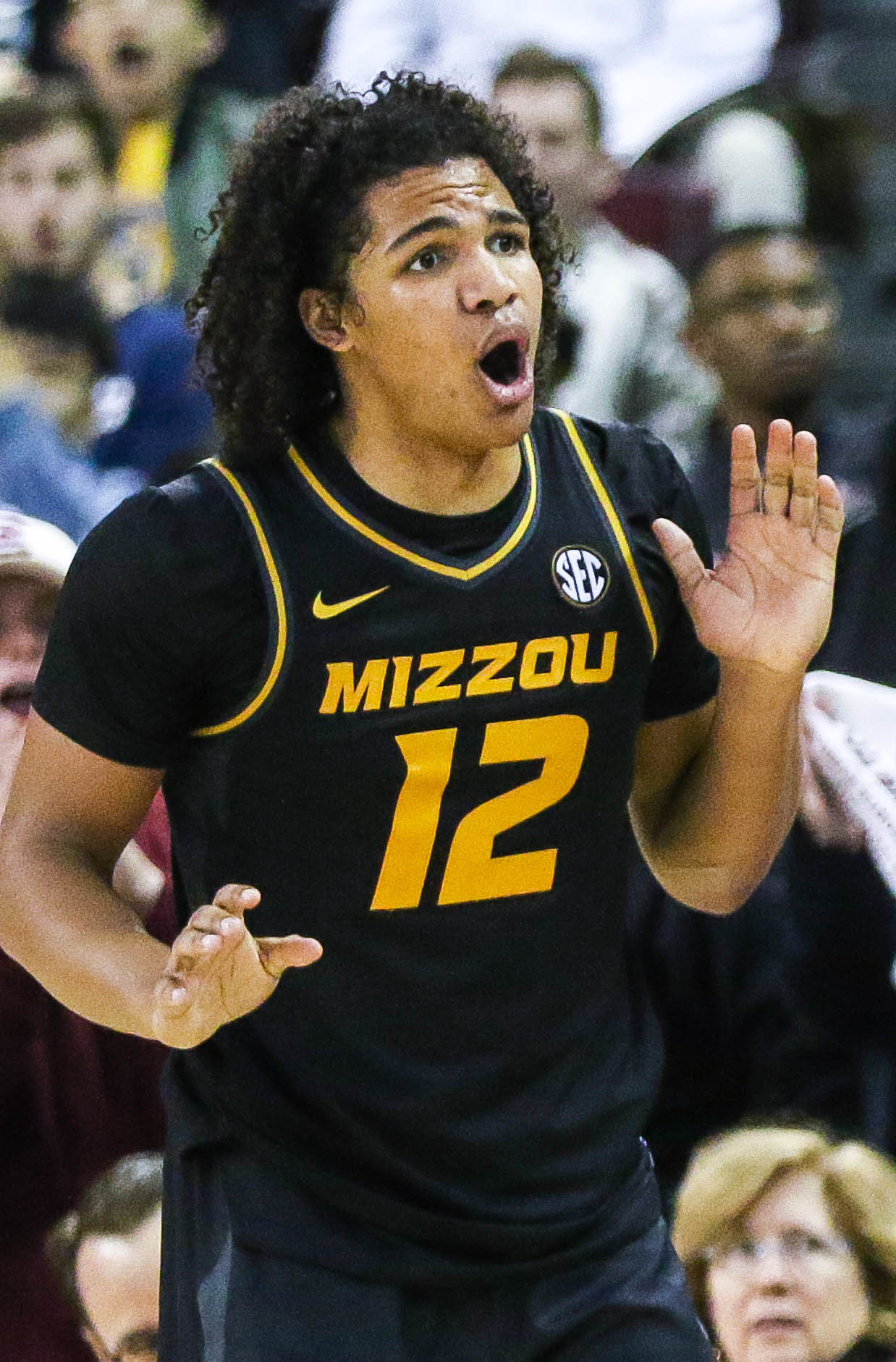
- Smith with Missouri in 2020

No. 12 – Miami Heat
- Position: Shooting guard
- League: NBA

Personal information
- Born: December 30, 1997 (age 28) Evansville, Indiana, U.S.
- Listed height: 6 ft 2 in (1.88 m)
- Listed weight: 203 lb (92 kg)

Career information
- High school: FJ Reitz (Evansville, Indiana)
- College: Evansville (2016–2018); Missouri (2019–2021)
- NBA draft: 2021: undrafted
- Playing career: 2021–present

Career history
- 2021–2023: Sioux Falls Skyforce
- 2022: Miami Heat
- 2023: Brooklyn Nets
- 2023: →Long Island Nets
- 2023–present: Miami Heat
- 2024: →Sioux Falls Skyforce

Career highlights
- First-team All-SEC – Coaches (2021); Second-team All-SEC – AP (2021); SEC All-Defensive Team (2021); MVC Most Improved Team (2018); MVC All-Freshman Team (2017)
- Stats at NBA.com
- Stats at Basketball Reference

Dru Smith (born December 30, 1997) is an American professional basketball player for the Miami Heat of the National Basketball Association (NBA). He played college basketball for the Evansville Purple Aces and the Missouri Tigers.

== High school career ==
Smith attended FJ Reitz High School in Evansville, Indiana. In his junior season he averaged 10.5 points, 5.4 rebounds and 4.5 assists per game as a starting point guard alongside Jaelan Sanford and Alex Stein. Smith helped his team achieve a 29–2 record and reach the Class 4A state title game. As a senior, he averaged 20.8 points, 7.3 assists, seven rebounds and 4.1 steals per game, leading Reitz to a 22–5 record and the Class 4A regional finals. Smith was named to the Indiana All-Star team. He committed to playing college basketball for Evansville over offers from Ball State, Northern Kentucky, South Alabama and Indiana State. Smith was drawn to the school because it was close to home.

== College career ==
=== Evansville ===
On February 22, 2017, Smith scored a freshman season-high 19 points for Evansville, making five three-pointers, in a 109–83 loss to Wichita State. As a freshman, he averaged 5.3 points, 2.9 assists and 2.6 rebounds per game, earning Missouri Valley Conference (MVC) All-Freshman Team honors. On December 5, 2017, Smith recorded a sophomore season-high 25 points, shooting 11-of-13 from the field, seven assists and four steals in a 91–76 win over Bowling Green. As a sophomore, he averaged 13.7 points, 4.6 assists and two steals per game, leading the MVC with a 48.2 three-point field goal percentage. He was named to the MVC Most Improved Team.

=== Missouri ===
After his sophomore season, Smith transferred to Missouri over offers from Xavier and Virginia Tech. He sat out the following season due to National Collegiate Athletic Association transfer rules. On November 12, 2019, he posted his first career double-double of 22 points and 10 rebounds in a 63–58 overtime loss to Xavier. On February 15, 2020, he scored a junior season-high 28 points in an 85–73 victory over 11th-ranked Auburn. As a junior, Smith averaged 12.7 points, 4.2 rebounds, 3.9 assists and 2.1 steals per game. He recorded 64 steals, which led the Southeastern Conference (SEC) and ranked sixth in program history. As a senior, Smith averaged 14.3 points, 3.8 assists, 3.5 rebounds and 2.1 steals per game.

== Professional career ==
=== Miami Heat / Sioux Falls Skyforce (2021–2023) ===
After going undrafted in the 2021 NBA draft, Smith joined the Miami Heat for the 2021 NBA Summer League and on September 10, he signed a contract with the Heat. He was waived prior to the start of the season and joined the Sioux Falls Skyforce as an affiliate player. On February 1, 2022, Smith was waived after being ruled out for the season with a knee injury.

On October 13, 2022, Smith was signed to a two-way contract with the Miami Heat. He was waived by the Heat on November 13, and subsequently re-joined the Skyforce. On November 25, 2022, Smith was re-signed to a two-way contract with the Heat and subsequently waived on December 11, and re-joined the Skyforce two days later.

=== Brooklyn Nets (2023) ===
On January 13, 2023, Smith signed a two-way contract with the Brooklyn Nets. In 10 appearances for Brooklyn, Smith averaged 3.3 points, 1.5 rebounds and 1.7 assists.

=== Second stint with Heat (2023–present) ===
On July 1, 2023, Smith signed a two-way contract with the Miami Heat and on October 21, his deal was converted into a standard contract.

On November 24, 2023, it was announced that Smith would miss the remainder of the 2023–24 NBA season due to an ACL injury sustained during a game against the Cleveland Cavaliers on November 22. The head coach of the Heat, Erik Spoelstra, blamed the court design at Rocket Mortgage FieldHouse for the incident. On March 6, 2024, he was waived by the Heat.

On July 1, 2024, Smith signed a two-way contract with the Heat. He played in 15 games for Miami, averaging 6.3 points, 2.6 rebounds and 1.6 assists. On December 24, it was announced that Smith had suffered a season-ending torn Achilles tendon.

On August 16, 2025, Smith re-signed with the Heat on a three-year, $7.9 million contract.

== Career statistics ==
Legend
GP	Games played	GS	Games started	MPG	Minutes per game
FG%	Field goal percentage	3P%	3-point field goal percentage	FT%	Free throw percentage
RPG	Rebounds per game	APG	Assists per game	SPG	Steals per game
BPG	Blocks per game	PPG	Points per game	**Bold**	Career high

=== NBA ===
Year	Team	GP	GS	MPG	FG%	3P%	FT%	RPG	APG	SPG	BPG	PPG
2022–23	Miami	5	**1**	13.4	.357	.167	—	1.8	1.0	.8	**.6**	2.2
2022–23	Brooklyn	10	0	9.1	.419	.308	**1.000**	1.5	1.7	.6	.1	3.3
2023–24	Miami	9	0	14.5	.455	.412	**1.000**	1.6	1.6	1.0	.3	4.3
2024–25	Miami	14	**1**	**19.1**	**.508**	**.533**	.769	**2.6**	1.6	**1.5**	.4	**6.3**
2025–26	Miami	**70**	**1**	16.3	.415	.295	.829	2.5	**2.6**	1.4	.3	5.6
Career		108	3	15.7	.429	.338	.828	2.3	2.2	1.3	.3	5.2

=== College ===
Year	Team	GP	GS	MPG	FG%	3P%	FT%	RPG	APG	SPG	BPG	PPG
2016–17	Evansville	28	8	22.5	.445	.327	.818	2.6	2.9	.8	.4	5.3
2017–18	Evansville	22	22	30.2	**.578**	**.482**	.862	3.5	**4.6**	2.0	**.5**	13.7
2018–19	Missouri	Redshirt										
2019–20	Missouri	**31**	**31**	32.8	.412	.294	**.899**	**4.2**	3.9	**2.1**	.4	12.7
2020–21	Missouri	26	26	**34.1**	.442	.398	.833	3.5	3.8	**2.1**	.3	**14.3**
Career		107	87	29.9	.459	.373	.865	3.5	3.8	1.7	.4	11.4
