= 2022–23 Brooklyn Nets season =

Season of National Basketball Association team the Brooklyn Nets

- Head coach: Steve Nash (fired); Jacque Vaughn
- General manager: Sean Marks
- Owner: Joseph Tsai
- Arena: Barclays Center

Results
- Record: 45–37 (.549)
- Place: Division: 4th (Atlantic); Conference: 6th (Eastern)
- Playoff finish: First round (lost to 76ers 0–4)
- Stats at Basketball Reference

Local media
- Television: YES Network, WWOR-TV
- Radio: WFAN AM/FM

The 2022–23 Brooklyn Nets season was the 47th season of the franchise in the National Basketball Association (NBA), 56th season overall, and its 11th season playing in the New York City borough of Brooklyn.

On November 1, 2022, Steve Nash was fired as the Nets' head coach after the team started the season with a 2–5 record and was replaced by Jacque Vaughn on an interim basis. On November 9, Vaughn was named the new head coach. On April 7, 2023, the Nets clinched a playoff spot after a 101–84 win against the Orlando Magic. In the first round of the 2023 NBA playoffs, they faced the Philadelphia 76ers, losing the series 4–0. It was the third time in four seasons that the Nets were swept in the first round of the playoffs (also in the 2020 and 2022 playoffs). As of 2026, this remains the Nets latest playoff appearance.

== Draft ==
The Nets did not hold any picks in the 2022 NBA draft. This is because they have traded in 2021 their original first-round pick to the Houston Rockets as part of the James Harden four-team deal and their original second-round pick to the Detroit Pistons.

== Roster ==
2022–23 Brooklyn Nets roster
Players

Pos.	No.	Player	Height	Weight	DOB	From
G/F	1	Mikal Bridges	6 ft 6 in (1.98 m)	209 lb (95 kg)	1996-08-30	Villanova
F/C	33	Nic Claxton	6 ft 11 in (2.11 m)	215 lb (98 kg)	1999-04-17	Georgia
G	30	Seth Curry	6 ft 1 in (1.85 m)	185 lb (84 kg)	1990-08-23	Duke
G	26	Spencer Dinwiddie	6 ft 5 in (1.96 m)	215 lb (98 kg)	1993-04-06	Colorado
G	6	David Jr. Duke	6 ft 4 in (1.93 m)	204 lb (93 kg)	1999-10-13	Providence
F	28	Dorian Finney-Smith	6 ft 7 in (2.01 m)	220 lb (100 kg)	1993-05-04	Florida
F	0	RaiQuan Gray (TW)	6 ft 7 in (2.01 m)	260 lb (118 kg)	1999-07-07	Florida State
G/F	12	Joe Harris	6 ft 6 in (1.98 m)	220 lb (100 kg)	1991-09-07	Virginia
F	2	Cameron Johnson	6 ft 8 in (2.03 m)	210 lb (95 kg)	1996-03-03	North Carolina
G	8	Patty Mills	6 ft 0 in (1.83 m)	180 lb (82 kg)	1988-08-11	Saint Mary's
F	00	Royce O'Neale	6 ft 6 in (1.98 m)	226 lb (103 kg)	1993-06-05	Baylor
C	20	Day'Ron Sharpe	6 ft 10 in (2.08 m)	265 lb (120 kg)	2001-11-06	North Carolina
G/F	10	Ben Simmons	6 ft 10 in (2.08 m)	240 lb (109 kg)	1996-07-20	LSU
G	9	Dru Smith (TW)	6 ft 3 in (1.91 m)	200 lb (91 kg)	1997-12-30	Missouri
G	4	Edmond Sumner	6 ft 4 in (1.93 m)	196 lb (89 kg)	1995-12-31	Xavier
G	24	Cam Thomas	6 ft 3 in (1.91 m)	210 lb (95 kg)	2001-10-13	LSU
G/F	18	Yuta Watanabe	6 ft 8 in (2.03 m)	214 lb (97 kg)	1994-10-13	George Washington

Coaches
Head coach
- Jacque Vaughn
Assistant(s)
- Adam Caporn
- Ryan Forehan-Kelly
- Trevor Hendry
- Royal Ivey
- Brian Keefe
- Igor Kokoškov
- Tiago Splitter

Legend
- (DP) Unsigned draft pick
- (FA) Free agent
- (S) Suspended
- (GL) On assignment to G League affiliate
- (TW) Two-way affiliate player
- Injured

Roster
Updated: April 22, 2023

== Standings ==
=== Division ===
Atlantic Division	W	L	PCT	GB	Home	Road	Div	GP
y – Boston Celtics	57	25	.695	–	32‍–‍9	25‍–‍16	11–5	82
x – Philadelphia 76ers	54	28	.659	3.0	29‍–‍12	25‍–‍16	10–6	82
x – New York Knicks	47	35	.573	10.0	23‍–‍18	24‍–‍17	8–8	82
x – Brooklyn Nets	45	37	.549	12.0	23‍–‍18	22‍–‍19	7–9	82
pi – Toronto Raptors	41	41	.500	16.0	27‍–‍14	14‍–‍27	4–12	82

=== Conference ===
Eastern Conference
#	Team	W	L	PCT	GB	GP
1	z – Milwaukee Bucks *	58	24	.707	–	82
2	y – Boston Celtics *	57	25	.695	1.0	82
3	x – Philadelphia 76ers	54	28	.659	4.0	82
4	x – Cleveland Cavaliers	51	31	.622	7.0	82
5	x – New York Knicks	47	35	.573	11.0	82
6	x – Brooklyn Nets	45	37	.549	13.0	82
7	y – Miami Heat *	44	38	.537	14.0	82
8	x – Atlanta Hawks	41	41	.500	17.0	82
9	pi – Toronto Raptors	41	41	.500	17.0	82
10	pi – Chicago Bulls	40	42	.488	18.0	82
11	Indiana Pacers	35	47	.427	23.0	82
12	Washington Wizards	35	47	.427	23.0	82
13	Orlando Magic	34	48	.415	24.0	82
14	Charlotte Hornets	27	55	.329	31.0	82
15	Detroit Pistons	17	65	.207	41.0	82

== Game log ==
=== Preseason ===
The preseason schedule was announced on July 18, 2022.

2022 preseason game log
Total: 2–2 (home: 0–2; road: 2–0)
Preseason: 2–2 (home: 0–2; road: 2–0)

Game	Date	Team	Score	High points	High rebounds	High assists	Location Attendance	Record
1	October 3	Philadelphia	L 108–127	Durant (13)	7 players (4)	Simmons (5)	Barclays Center; 13,250	0–1
2	October 6	Miami	L 80–109	Durant (22)	Simmons (10)	Chiozza, Simmons (4)	Barclays Center; 14,058	0–2
3	October 12	@ Milwaukee	W 107–97	Irving (23)	Claxton (9)	Simmons (10)	Fiserv Forum; 12,544	1–2
4	October 14	@ Minnesota	W 112–102	Irving (26)	Sharpe (13)	Durant, Summons (6)	Target Center; 12,787	2–2

2022–23 preseason schedule

=== Regular season ===
The regular season schedule was released on August 17, 2022.

2022–23 game log
Total: 45–37 (home: 23–18; road: 22–19)
October: 2–5 (home: 2–3; road: 0–2)

Game	Date	Team	Score	High points	High rebounds	High assists	Location Attendance	Record
1	October 19	New Orleans	L 108–130	Durant (32)	Claxton (10)	Irving, Simmons (5)	Barclays Center; 18,003	0–1
2	October 21	Toronto	W 109–105	Irving (30)	Claxton (11)	Simmons (8)	Barclays Center; 17,732	1–1
3	October 24	@ Memphis	L 124–134	Durant, Irving (37)	Irving (8)	Simmons (8)	FedExForum; 17,392	1–2
4	October 26	@ Milwaukee	L 99–110	Durant (33)	Irving (9)	Simmons (9)	Fiserv Forum; 17,341	1–3
5	October 27	Dallas	L 125–129 (OT)	Irving (39)	Simmons (8)	Durant (5)	Barclays Center; 18,039	1–4
6	October 29	Indiana	L 116–125	Irving (35)	Claxton (9)	Simmons (9)	Barclays Center; 17,732	1–5
7	October 31	Indiana	W 116–109	Durant (36)	Claxton, Durant (9)	Durant (7)	Barclays Center; 15,770	2–5

November: 10–6 (home: 5–1; road: 5–5)

Game	Date	Team	Score	High points	High rebounds	High assists	Location Attendance	Record
8	November 1	Chicago	L 99–108	Durant (32)	Claxton (10)	Irving (7)	Barclays Center; 17,732	2–6
9	November 4	@ Washington	W 128–86	Durant (28)	Claxton, Durant (9)	Durant (11)	Capital One Arena; 17,258	3–6
10	November 5	@ Charlotte	W 98–94	Durant (27)	Claxton (9)	O'Neale (5)	Spectrum Center; 19,398	4–6
11	November 7	@ Dallas	L 94–96	Durant (26)	Claxton (14)	O'Neale (8)	American Airlines Center; 20,011	4–7
12	November 9	New York	W 112–85	Durant (29)	Durant (12)	Durant (12)	Barclays Center; 18,156	5–7
13	November 12	@ L.A. Clippers	W 110–95	Durant (27)	Claxton (14)	Sumner (4)	Crypto.com Arena; 17,777	6–7
14	November 13	@ L.A. Lakers	L 103–116	Durant (31)	Durant (9)	Durant (7)	Crypto.com Arena; 18,040	6–8
15	November 15	@ Sacramento	L 121–153	Durant (27)	Simmons (5)	Durant (6)	Golden 1 Center; 17,611	6–9
16	November 17	@ Portland	W 109–107	Durant (35)	Simmons (13)	O'Neale (11)	Moda Center; 19,393	7–9
17	November 20	Memphis	W 127–115	Durant (26)	Simmons (8)	O'Neale (8)	Barclays Center; 18,241	8–9
18	November 22	@ Philadelphia	L 106–115	Irving (23)	O'Neale, Simmons (7)	Simmons (11)	Wells Fargo Center; 20,184	8–10
19	November 23	@ Toronto	W 112–98	Irving (29)	Claxton (12)	O'Neale (7)	Scotiabank Arena; 19,800	9–10
20	November 25	@ Indiana	L 117–128	Durant (36)	Claxton (11)	Durant (8)	Gainbridge Fieldhouse; 15,404	9–11
21	November 27	Portland	W 111–97	Durant (31)	Simmons (12)	Simmons (8)	Barclays Center; 17,732	10–11
22	November 28	Orlando	W 109–102	Durant (45)	Claxton (13)	Durant, O'Neale (5)	Barclays Center; 15,704	11–11
23	November 30	Washington	W 113–107	Durant (39)	Claxton, O'Neale (8)	O'Neale (7)	Barclays Center; 15,963	12–11

December: 12–1 (home: 5–1; road: 7–0)

Game	Date	Team	Score	High points	High rebounds	High assists	Location Attendance	Record
24	December 2	Toronto	W 114–105	Irving (27)	Claxton, Durant (9)	Durant (7)	Barclays Center; 17,732	13–11
25	December 4	Boston	L 92–103	Durant (31)	Claxton (14)	Durant, Irving (5)	Barclays Center; 18,043	13–12
26	December 7	Charlotte	W 122–116	Irving (33)	Durant (9)	Irving (9)	Barclays Center; 16,903	14–12
27	December 9	Atlanta	W 120–116	Durant (34)	Irving (11)	Simmons (7)	Barclays Center; 18,072	15–12
28	December 10	@ Indiana	W 136–133	Thomas (33)	Sharpe (12)	Mills (6)	Gainbridge Fieldhouse; 14,280	16–12
29	December 12	@ Washington	W 112–100	Durant (30)	Durant (9)	Durant (6)	Capital One Arena; 16,090	17–12
30	December 16	@ Toronto	W 119–116	Irving (32)	Claxton (10)	Irving, Simmons (5)	Scotiabank Arena; 19,800	18–12
31	December 18	@ Detroit	W 124–121	Durant (43)	Simmons (8)	Simmons (8)	Little Caesars Arena; 19,488	19–12
32	December 21	Golden State	W 143–113	Durant (23)	Claxton, Durant (7)	Simmons (8)	Barclays Center; 18,026	20–12
33	December 23	Milwaukee	W 118–100	Durant (24)	Simmons (11)	Simmons (8)	Barclays Center; 18,169	21–12
34	December 26	@ Cleveland	W 125–117	Durant, Irving (32)	Durant, Simmons (9)	Simmons (8)	Rocket Mortgage FieldHouse; 19,432	22–12
35	December 28	@ Atlanta	W 108–107	Irving (28)	Durant (16)	Durant, Irving (8)	State Farm Arena; 18,030	23–12
36	December 31	@ Charlotte	W 123–106	Irving (28)	Warren (7)	O'Neale (6)	Spectrum Center; 19,386	24–12

January: 7–7 (home: 3–3; road: 4–4)

Game	Date	Team	Score	High points	High rebounds	High assists	Location Attendance	Record
37	January 2	San Antonio	W 139–103	Irving (27)	Irving (8)	Durant (11)	Barclays Center; 18,224	25–12
38	January 4	@ Chicago	L 112–121	Durant (44)	Simmons (9)	Irving (8)	United Center; 21,418	25–13
39	January 6	@ New Orleans	W 108–102	Durant (33)	Durant (10)	Simmons (10)	Smoothie King Center; 18,636	26–13
40	January 8	@ Miami	W 102–101	Irving (29)	Claxton (11)	Simmons (7)	FTX Arena (Note: FTX Arena was renamed to Miami-Dade Arena on January 11, 2023.); 19,901	27–13
41	January 12	Boston	L 98–109	Irving (24)	Claxton, Simmons (9)	Simmons (13)	Barclays Center; 18,125	27–14
42	January 15	Oklahoma City	L 102–112	Curry (23)	Claxton (13)	O'Neale (8)	Barclays Center; 18,165	27–15
43	January 17	@ San Antonio	L 98–106	Warren (19)	Claxton (11)	Simmons (11)	AT&T Center; 13,532	27–16
44	January 19	@ Phoenix	L 112–117	Irving (30)	Claxton (11)	Irving (7)	Footprint Center; 17,071	27–17
45	January 20	@ Utah	W 117–106	Irving (48)	Irving (11)	Irving, O'Neale (6)	Vivint Arena; 18,206	28–17
46	January 22	@ Golden State	W 120–116	Irving (38)	Claxton (15)	Simmons (11)	Chase Center; 18,064	29–17
47	January 25	@ Philadelphia	L 133–137	Curry (32)	Claxton (11)	Irving (10)	Wells Fargo Center; 19,772	29–18
48	January 26	Detroit	L 122–130	Irving (40)	Claxton (13)	Simmons (7)	Barclays Center; 17,732	29–19
49	January 28	New York	W 122–115	Irving (32)	Claxton (12)	Irving (9)	Barclays Center; 18,100	30–19
50	January 30	L.A. Lakers	W 121–104	Irving (26)	Sharpe (14)	Irving (6)	Barclays Center; 17,924	31–19

February: 3–8 (home: 3–4; road: 0–4)

Game	Date	Team	Score	High points	High rebounds	High assists	Location Attendance	Record
51	February 1	@ Boston	L 96–139	Irving (20)	Sharpe (7)	Irving, O'Neale (4)	TD Garden; 19,156	31–20
52	February 4	Washington	W 125–123	Thomas (44)	Claxton (13)	Claxton, Thomas (5)	Barclays Center; 17,732	32–20
53	February 6	L.A. Clippers	L 116–124	Thomas (47)	Claxton (16)	Smith (4)	Barclays Center; 16,981	32–21
54	February 7	Phoenix	L 112–116	Thomas (43)	Claxton (13)	O'Neale, Simmons (6)	Barclays Center; 17,093	32–22
55	February 9	Chicago	W 116–105	Dinwiddie (25)	Sharpe (12)	Dinwiddie (6)	Barclays Center; 16,938	33–22
56	February 11	Philadelphia	L 98–101	Bridges (23)	Finney-Smith (8)	Dinwiddie (6)	Barclays Center; 17,732	33–23
57	February 13	@ New York	L 106–124	Dinwiddie (28)	Sharpe (8)	Dinwiddie (4)	Madison Square Garden; 19,812	33–24
58	February 15	Miami	W 116–105	Bridges (45)	Claxton (9)	Bridges, Dinwiddie (5)	Barclays Center; 17,963	34–24
59	February 24	@ Chicago	L 87–131	Thomas (22)	Bridges, Claxton, Finney-Smith (6)	Dinwiddie (5)	United Center; 21,286	34–25
60	February 26	@ Atlanta	L 127–129	Johnson (27)	Claxton (11)	Dinwiddie (8)	State Farm Arena; 16,983	34–26
61	February 28	Milwaukee	L 104–118	Bridges (31)	Claxton, Johnson (7)	Dinwiddie (8)	Barclays Center; 17,732	34–27

March: 8–8 (home: 3–4; road: 5–4)

Game	Date	Team	Score	High points	High rebounds	High assists	Location Attendance	Record
62	March 1	@ New York	L 118–142	Johnson (33)	Claxton (8)	Dinwiddie (10)	Madison Square Garden; 19,812	34–28
63	March 3	@ Boston	W 115–105	Bridges (38)	Claxton (12)	Dinwiddie (8)	TD Garden; 19,156	35–28
64	March 5	Charlotte	W 102–86	Bridges (33)	Claxton (12)	Dinwiddie (8)	Barclays Center; 17,921	36–28
65	March 7	@ Houston	W 118–96	Bridges (30)	Claxton (13)	Bridges (5)	Toyota Center; 14,833	37–28
66	March 9	@ Milwaukee	L 113–118	Mills (23)	Watanabe (9)	Smith (5)	Fiserv Forum; 17,341	37–29
67	March 10	@ Minnesota	W 124–123 (OT)	Bridges (34)	O'Neale (15)	Dinwiddie (11)	Target Center; 17,136	38–29
68	March 12	@ Denver	W 122–120	Bridges (25)	Claxton, Dinwiddie, O'Neale (6)	Dinwiddie (16)	Ball Arena; 19,739	39–29
69	March 14	@ Oklahoma City	L 107–121	Bridges (34)	Claxton (12)	Dinwiddie (11)	Paycom Center; 16,976	39–30
70	March 16	Sacramento	L 96–101	Bridges (23)	Claxton (14)	Dinwiddie (7)	Barclays Center; 18,172	39–31
71	March 19	Denver	L 102–108	Bridges (23)	Claxton (8)	Dinwiddie (11)	Barclays Center; 18,235	39–32
72	March 21	Cleveland	L 109–115	Sharpe (20)	Sharpe (11)	Dinwiddie (11)	Barclays Center; 17,732	39–33
73	March 23	Cleveland	L 114–116	Bridges (32)	Claxton (9)	Dinwiddie (12)	Barclays Center; 17,732	39–34
74	March 25	@ Miami	W 129–100	Bridges (27)	Claxton (10)	Dinwiddie (9)	Miami-Dade Arena; 19,680	40–34
75	March 26	@ Orlando	L 106–119	Bridges (44)	Claxton (9)	Dinwiddie (5)	Amway Center; 17,862	40–35
76	March 29	Houston	W 123–114	Johnson (31)	Claxton (10)	Dinwiddie (11)	Barclays Center; 17,074	41–35
77	March 31	Atlanta	W 124–107	Bridges (42)	Claxton (12)	Dinwiddie (12)	Barclays Center; 17,849	42–35

April: 3–2 (home: 2–2; road: 1–0)

Game	Date	Team	Score	High points	High rebounds	High assists	Location Attendance	Record
78	April 2	Utah	W 111–110	Bridges (30)	Bridges, Claxton, Sharpe (7)	Dinwiddie (12)	Barclays Center; 17,732	43–35
79	April 4	Minnesota	L 102–107	Dinwiddie (30)	Finney-Smith (10)	Dinwiddie (6)	Barclays Center; 17,893	43–36
80	April 5	@ Detroit	W 123–108	Bridges (26)	Claxton, O'Neale, Sharpe (7)	Dinwiddie (16)	Little Caesars Arena; 18,313	44–36
81	April 7	Orlando	W 101–84	Bridges (22)	Claxton (15)	Dinwiddie (14)	Barclays Center; 18,177	45–36
82	April 9	Philadelphia	L 105–134	Thomas (46)	Sharpe (10)	Gray (7)	Barclays Center; 17,732	45–37

2022–23 season schedule

=== Playoffs ===
2023 playoff game log
Total: 0–4 (home: 0–2; road: 0–2)
First round: 0–4 (home: 0–2; road: 0–2)

Game	Date	Team	Score	High points	High rebounds	High assists	Location Attendance	Series
1	April 15	@ Philadelphia	L 101–121	Bridges (30)	Claxton (10)	Dinwiddie (7)	Wells Fargo Center; 20,913	0–1
2	April 17	@ Philadelphia	L 84–96	Johnson (28)	Finney-Smith (7)	Bridges (7)	Wells Fargo Center; 20,958	0–2
3	April 20	Philadelphia	L 97–102	Bridges (26)	Finney-Smith (9)	Dinwiddie (7)	Barclays Center; 17,910	0–3
4	April 22	Philadelphia	L 88–96	Dinwiddie (20)	Claxton (12)	Dinwiddie (6)	Barclays Center; 18,037	0–4

2023 playoff schedule

== Player statistics ==
Legend
GP	Games played	GS	Games started	MPG	Minutes per game
FG%	Field-goal percentage	3P%	3-point field-goal percentage	FT%	Free-throw percentage
RPG	Rebounds per game	APG	Assists per game	SPG	Steals per game
BPG	Blocks per game	PPG	Points per game

=== Regular season statistics ===
As of April 9, 2023

Brooklyn Nets statistics
Player	GP	GS	MPG	FG%	3P%	FT%	RPG	APG	SPG	BPG	PPG
Mikal Bridges	27	27	34.2	.475	.376	.894	4.5	2.7	1.0	.6	26.1
Moses Brown	2	0	3.0	—	—	—	.0	.0	.5	.0	.0
Nic Claxton	76	76	29.9	.705	.000	.541	9.2	1.9	.9	2.5	12.6
Seth Curry	61	7	19.9	.463	.405	.927	1.6	1.6	.6	.1	9.2
Spencer Dinwiddie	26	26	35.3	.404	.289	.797	4.1	9.1	1.1	.3	16.5
David Duke Jr.	23	0	9.9	.462	.083	.706	1.3	.9	.4	.0	3.7
Kevin Durant	39	39	36.0	.559	.376	.934	6.7	5.3	.8	1.5	29.7
Kessler Edwards	14	1	5.6	.250	.167	.500	1.0	.1	.2	.1	1.1
Dorian Finney-Smith	26	26	27.7	.351	.306	.789	4.9	1.6	.7	.6	7.2
RaiQuan Gray	1	0	35.0	.500	.400	1.000	9.0	7.0	.0	1.0	16.0
Joe Harris	74	33	20.6	.457	.426	.643	2.2	1.4	.5	.2	7.6
Kyrie Irving	40	40	37.0	.486	.374	.883	5.1	5.3	1.0	.8	27.1
Cameron Johnson	25	25	30.8	.468	.372	.851	4.8	2.1	1.4	.3	16.6
Patty Mills	40	2	14.2	.411	.366	.833	1.1	1.4	.4	.1	6.2
Markieff Morris	27	1	10.6	.402	.408	1.000	2.2	.9	.3	.2	3.6
Nerlens Noel	3	1	14.3	.167	—	.500	3.0	1.0	1.0	.3	1.0
Royce O'Neale	76	53	31.7	.386	.389	.725	5.1	3.7	.9	.6	8.8
Day'Ron Sharpe	48	3	11.5	.544	.545	.636	4.2	.8	.3	.7	4.7
Ben Simmons	42	33	26.3	.566	.000	.439	6.3	6.1	1.3	.6	6.9
Dru Smith	10	0	9.1	.419	.308	1.000	1.5	1.7	.6	.1	3.3
Edmond Sumner	53	12	13.9	.461	.356	.917	1.5	1.3	.6	.2	7.1
Cam Thomas	57	4	16.6	.441	.383	.868	1.7	1.4	.4	.1	10.6
T. J. Warren	26	0	18.8	.510	.333	.818	2.8	1.1	.6	.3	9.5
Yuta Watanabe	58	1	16.0	.491	.444	.723	2.4	.8	.4	.3	5.6
Alondes Williams	1	0	5.0	—	—	—	1.0	.0	.0	.0	.0

=== Playoff statistics ===
As of April 22, 2023

Brooklyn Nets statistics
Player	GP	GS	MPG	FG%	3P%	FT%	RPG	APG	SPG	BPG	PPG
Mikal Bridges	4	4	39.3	.429	.400	.783	5.3	4.0	.5	.5	23.5
Nic Claxton	4	4	29.3	.720	—	.600	8.0	1.5	.3	1.8	10.5
Seth Curry	3	0	19.3	.526	.333	.667	1.0	2.0	.0	.0	8.3
Spencer Dinwiddie	4	4	39.8	.431	.389	.682	3.3	6.5	1.3	.3	16.5
David Duke Jr.	1	0	5.0	.333	.000	—	.0	.0	.0	.0	2.0
Dorian Finney-Smith	4	4	25.3	.391	.412	—	4.5	.8	.8	.5	6.3
Joe Harris	4	0	11.0	.154	.083	1.000	1.3	.0	.5	.0	1.8
Cameron Johnson	4	4	38.0	.509	.429	.857	5.8	2.8	.8	.3	18.5
Patty Mills	1	0	5.0	.000	.000	—	.0	.0	.0	.0	.0
Royce O'Neale	4	0	29.5	.241	.182	1.000	4.3	3.5	1.3	.3	5.0
Day'Ron Sharpe	2	0	10.0	.667	—	1.000	3.0	2.5	.0	.5	3.0
Edmond Sumner	1	0	4.0	—	—	—	.0	1.0	.0	.0	.0
Cam Thomas	2	0	8.0	.429	.000	—	.5	.5	.0	.0	3.0
Yuta Watanabe	1	0	5.0	.500	.500	.000	1.0	.0	.0	.0	3.0

== Transactions ==
=== Trades ===
June 30, 2022	To Brooklyn Nets Royce O'Neale	To Utah Jazz 2023 first-round pick
February 6, 2023	To Brooklyn Nets Spencer Dinwiddie; Dorian Finney-Smith; 2027 second-round pick 2029 first-round pick 2029 second-round pick	To Dallas Mavericks Kyrie Irving; Markieff Morris
February 8, 2023	To Brooklyn Nets Draft rights to David Michineau	To Sacramento Kings Kessler Edwards; Cash considerations
February 9, 2023	To Brooklyn Nets Mikal Bridges; Cameron Johnson; 2023 first-round pick 2025 first-round pick 2027 first-round pick 2028 first-round pick swap 2028 second-round pick 2029 first-round pick 2029 second-round pick Draft rights to Juan Pablo Vaulet	To Indiana Pacers George Hill; Serge Ibaka; Jordan Nwora; 3 future second-round picks Cash considerations
February 9, 2023	To Milwaukee Bucks Jae Crowder	To Phoenix Suns Kevin Durant; T. J. Warren

=== Additions ===
Date	Player	Former team	Ref
July 4, 2022	Alondes Williams	Wake Forest Demon Deacons	
July 7, 2022	T. J. Warren	Indiana Pacers	
July 8, 2022	Edmond Sumner	—	
August 28, 2022	Yuta Watanabe	Toronto Raptors	
September 7, 2022	Markieff Morris	Miami Heat	
September 16, 2022	Chris Chiozza	Golden State Warriors	
September 25, 2022	Marcus Zegarowski	Long Island Nets	
September 26, 2022	RaiQuan Gray	Long Island Nets	
January 13, 2023	Dru Smith	Sioux Falls Skyforce	
March 6, 2023	Nerlens Noel	Detroit Pistons	
March 17, 2023	Moses Brown	New York Knicks	
March 28, 2023	Moses Brown	—	

=== Subtractions ===
Date	Player	New team	Ref
July 6, 2022	Andre Drummond	Chicago Bulls	
July 7, 2022	Bruce Brown	Denver Nuggets	
August 2, 2022	Goran Dragić	Chicago Bulls	
September 29, 2022	Marcus Zegarowski	Long Island Nets	
October 3, 2022	Blake Griffin	Boston Celtics	
October 15, 2022	Chris Chiozza	Long Island Nets	
October 15, 2022	RaiQuan Gray	Long Island Nets	
January 12, 2023	Alondes Williams	Long Island Nets	
March 15, 2023	Nerlens Noel		
April 6, 2023	Moses Brown	Portland Trail Blazers	
