= David Duke Jr. =

American basketball player (born 1999)

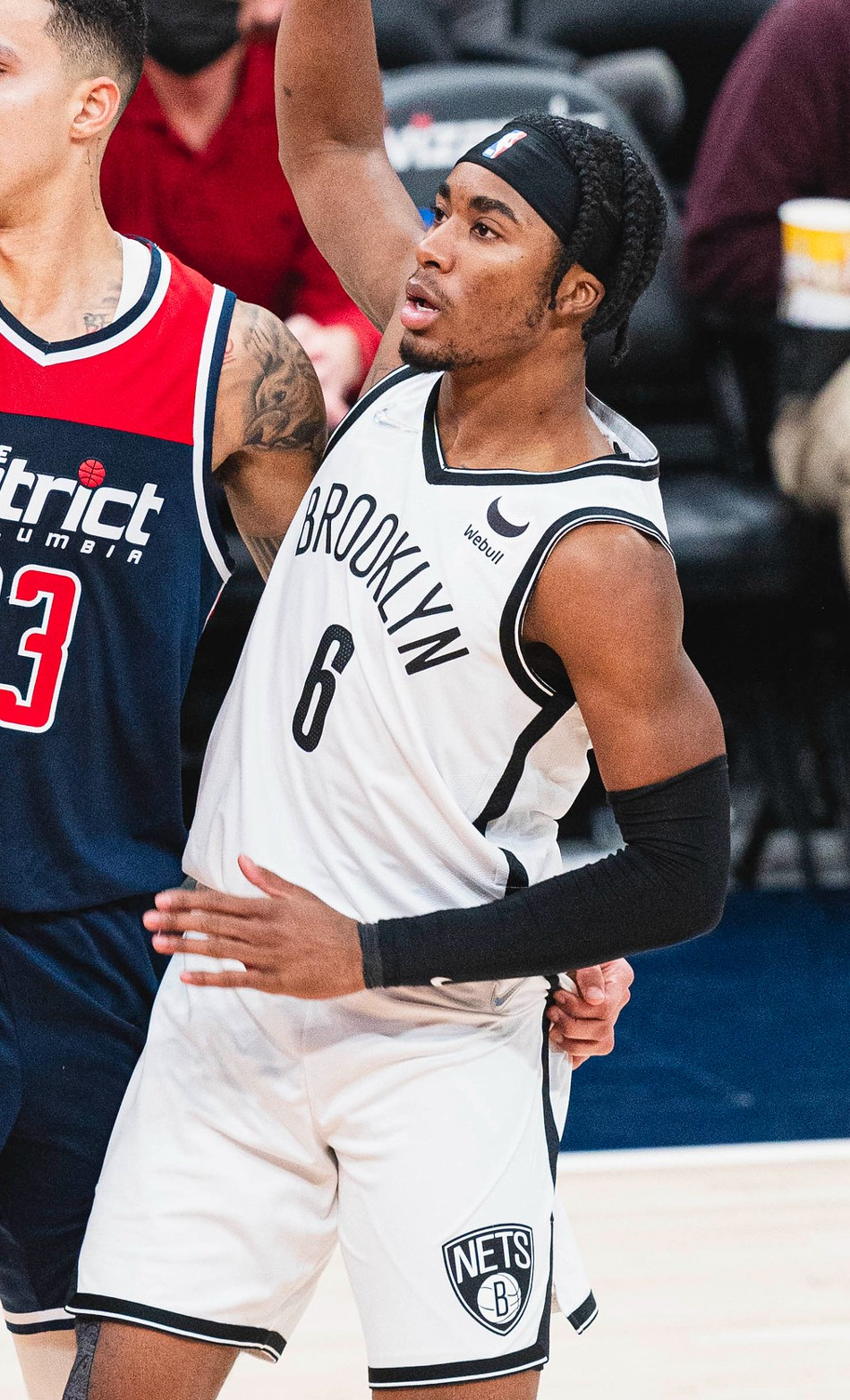
- Duke with the Brooklyn Nets in 2022

No. 3 – Pallacanestro Varese
- Position: Shooting guard / point guard
- League: LBA; Champions League

Personal information
- Born: October 13, 1999 (age 27) Providence, Rhode Island, U.S.
- Listed height: 6 ft 4 in (1.93 m)
- Listed weight: 204 lb (93 kg)

Career information
- High school: Classical (Providence, Rhode Island); Cushing Academy (Ashburnham, Massachusetts)
- College: Providence (2018–2021)
- NBA draft: 2021: undrafted
- Playing career: 2021–present

Career history
- 2021–2023: Brooklyn Nets
- 2021–2023: →Long Island Nets
- 2023: Delaware Blue Coats
- 2023–2025: San Antonio Spurs
- 2023–2025: →Austin Spurs
- 2025–2026: Perth Wildcats
- 2026: Bàsquet Manresa
- 2026–present: Pallacanestro Varese

Career highlights
- All-NBA G League First Team (2023); NBA G League Next Up Game (2023); Second-team All-Big East (2021)
- Stats at NBA.com
- Stats at Basketball Reference

David Duke Jr. (born October 13, 1999) is an American professional basketball player for Pallacanestro Varese of the Lega Basket Serie A. He has previously played for the San Antonio Spurs of the National Basketball Association (NBA) and with the Austin Spurs of the NBA G League. He played college basketball for the Providence Friars.

== Early life ==
Duke was born and raised in Providence, Rhode Island. He grew up playing soccer and football and running track, not fully devoting himself to basketball until high school.

== High school career ==
As a freshman at Classical High School in Providence, Duke stood 5 feet 6 inches (1.68 m) and played at the junior varsity level. Duke grew to 6 feet 1 inch (1.85 m) and joined the varsity team in his sophomore season. As a junior, he averaged 15 points per game and led his team to a Division 1 state title. After the season, Duke transferred to Cushing Academy in Ashburnham, Massachusetts and repeated his junior year due to reclassification. He played with Wabissa Bede and helped his team win the New England Preparatory School Athletic Council (NEPSAC) Class AA title. As a senior, Duke averaged 17 points, five rebounds and four assists per game and helped Cushing reach the NEPSAC Class AA semifinals. A four-star recruit, he committed to playing college basketball for Providence over offers from Virginia Tech, Florida, Indiana and Villanova.

== College career ==
Entering his first season at Providence, Duke shared preseason Big East Freshman of the Year honors with Jahvon Quinerly. He immediately became the team's starting point guard but moved off the ball by the end of the season. On November 17, 2018, Duke scored a freshman season-high 20 points in a 76–67 win over South Carolina. As a freshman, he averaged 7.1 points, 2.6 rebounds and 2.1 assists per game. On January 18, 2020, Duke scored a sophomore season-high 36 points, shooting 6-of-8 from three-point range, in a 78–74 loss to Creighton. As a sophomore, he averaged 12 points, 4.2 rebounds, 3.1 assists and 1.5 steals per game, shooting 42 percent on three-pointers. Duke averaged 16.8 points, 6.3 rebounds and 4.8 assists per game as a junior. He was named to the Second Team All-Big East. On April 2, 2021, Duke declared for the 2021 NBA draft, forgoing his remaining college eligibility.

== Professional career ==
=== Brooklyn Nets / Long Island Nets (2021–2023) ===
After going undrafted in the 2021 NBA draft, Duke signed with the Brooklyn Nets on August 8, 2021. He played for the Nets during the 2021 NBA Summer League. On October 16, the Nets converted Duke to a two-way contract. He subsequently split his time during the 2021–22 season between Brooklyn and their NBA G League affiliate, the Long Island Nets.

Duke joined the Nets for the 2022 NBA Summer League after turning down a new two-way contract offer from the team. However, he ultimately re-signed with the Nets on a two-way deal on September 16, 2022, once again splitting the 2022–23 season between Brooklyn and Long Island. Duke was named to the G League's inaugural Next Up Game in February 2023. In 22 games with Long Island during the 2022–23 NBA G League season, Duke averaged a team-leading 22.9 points (fifth in the NBA G League) on 47.8 percent shooting from the field, 32.1 percent shooting from 3-point range and 80.5 percent shooting from the free-throw line, to go with 6.1 rebounds, 3.8 assists and 1.9 steals (10th in the NBA G League) in a team-high 34.2 minutes per game. He also appeared in seven NBA G League Showcase games and played in two postseason games for Long Island, averaging 21.6 and 16.0 points per game, respectively. He finished third in the NBA G League Most Valuable Player Award voting and was named to the All-NBA G League First Team.

On April 7, 2023, Duke signed a standard contract with Brooklyn to finish the season. He then re-joined the Nets for the 2023 NBA Summer League.

=== Delaware Blue Coats (2023) ===
On September 11, 2023, Duke signed with the Philadelphia 76ers, but was waived on October 20. He subsequently joined the Delaware Blue Coats for the 2023–24 NBA G League season. In 11 games with the Blue Coats, he averaged 21.7 points, 5.5 rebounds, 4.1 assists in 31.5 minutes.

=== San Antonio / Austin Spurs (2023–2025) ===
On December 14, 2023, Duke signed a two-way contract with the San Antonio Spurs. In 38 games (37 starts) with the Austin Spurs during the 2023–24 NBA G League season, he averaged a team-high 19.8 points to go with 6.4 rebounds, 4.6 assists and 1.3 steals in 32.9 minutes per game. He then finished the 2023–24 NBA season averaging 6.5 points, 2.5 rebounds and 1.3 assists in 12.8 minutes in four games for San Antonio.

Despite being sidelined for the 2024 NBA Summer League, Duke re-signed with San Antonio on another two-way contract on July 26, 2024. He appeared in six games with San Antonio during the 2024–25 season while also playing with the Austin Spurs of the NBA G League, averaging 16.9 points, 6.7 rebounds and 3.1 assists in 27 regular season games (all starts).

On September 23, 2025, Duke signed with the Phoenix Suns, but was waived on October 17.

=== Perth Wildcats (2025–2026) ===
On October 24, 2025, Duke signed with the Perth Wildcats of the Australian National Basketball League (NBL) for the rest of the 2025–26 season, replacing their previous international guard, Mason Jones. On December 28, he suffered a serious elbow injury during a loss to the Adelaide 36ers. He returned to the court in mid February.

=== Bàsquet Manresa (2026) ===
On March 30, 2026, Duke signed with Bàsquet Manresa of the Spanish Liga ACB for the rest of the 2025–26 season.

=== Pallacanestro Varese (2026–present) ===
On July 27, 2026, Duke signed a multi–year contract with Pallacanestro Varese of the Lega Basket Serie A.

== National team career ==
Duke represented the United States at the 2019 Pan American Games in Peru. He helped his team win the bronze medal and recorded 16 points, four assists and three steals in a 114–75 loss to Argentina in the semifinals.

== Career statistics ==
Legend
GP	Games played	GS	Games started	MPG	Minutes per game
FG%	Field goal percentage	3P%	3-point field goal percentage	FT%	Free throw percentage
RPG	Rebounds per game	APG	Assists per game	SPG	Steals per game
BPG	Blocks per game	PPG	Points per game	**Bold**	Career high

=== NBA ===
==== Regular season ====
Year	Team	GP	GS	MPG	FG%	3P%	FT%	RPG	APG	SPG	BPG	PPG
2021–22	Brooklyn	22	**7**	**15.5**	.361	.243	.810	**3.0**	.8	**.6**	**.3**	4.7
2022–23	Brooklyn	**23**	0	9.9	.462	.083	.706	1.3	.9	.4	.0	3.7
2023–24	San Antonio	4	0	12.8	**.556**	**.500**	**1.000**	2.5	**1.3**	.5	.0	**6.5**
Career		49	7	12.7	.417	.236	.780	2.2	.9	.5	.2	4.4

==== Playoffs ====
Year	Team	GP	GS	MPG	FG%	3P%	FT%	RPG	APG	SPG	BPG	PPG
2023	Brooklyn	1	0	4.7	.333	.000	—	.0	.0	.0	.0	2.0
Career		1	0	4.7	.333	.000	—	.0	.0	.0	.0	2.0

=== College ===
Year	Team	GP	GS	MPG	FG%	3P%	FT%	RPG	APG	SPG	BPG	PPG
2018–19	Providence	**34**	**34**	24.7	.387	.297	.689	2.6	2.1	.7	.3	7.1
2019–20	Providence	31	31	32.2	**.409**	**.420**	**.793**	4.2	3.1	**1.5**	**.4**	12.0
2020–21	Providence	26	26	**37.1**	.387	.389	.792	**6.3**	**4.8**	1.2	.3	**16.8**
Career		91	91	30.8	.394	.377	.769	4.2	3.2	1.1	.3	11.5

== Personal life ==
Duke is the son of David and Sharon Duke. He has two brothers, Sean and Jordan. His parents are Liberian refugees who escaped from war-torn Liberia before reuniting in Providence.

In 2023, Duke dedicated a feeding hall in Liberia through his foundation, The David Duke Jr. Foundation, to help feed underprivileged children.

In 2025, Duke married his longtime girlfriend, Kayla Lopez, in Paris.
