= Trevor Keels =

American basketball player (born 2003)

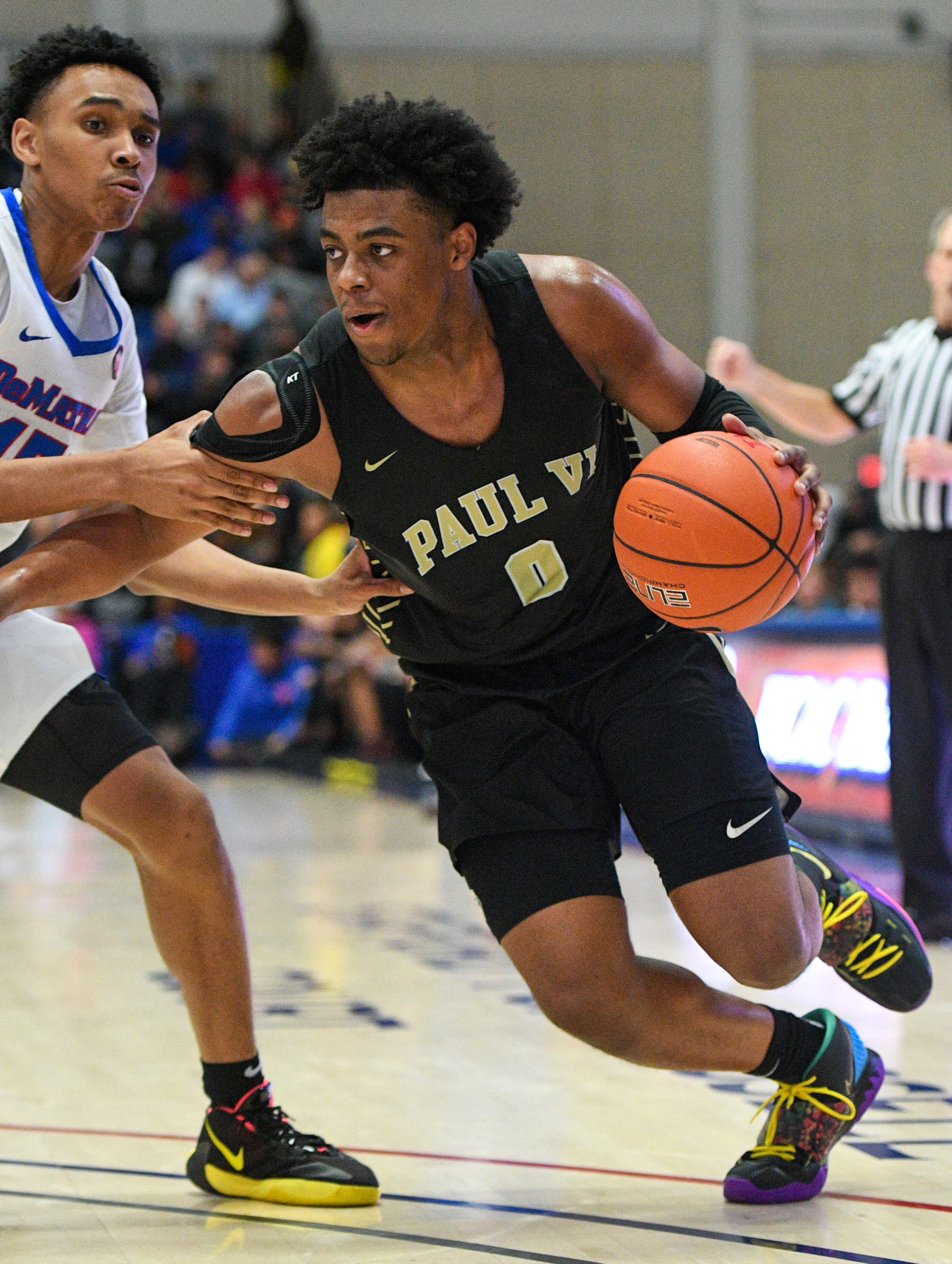
- Keels with Paul VI Catholic in 2020

No. 0 – Capital City Go-Go
- Position: Shooting guard
- League: NBA G League

Personal information
- Born: August 26, 2003 (age 23) Clinton, Maryland, U.S.
- Listed height: 6 ft 3 in (1.91 m)
- Listed weight: 215 lb (98 kg)

Career information
- High school: Paul VI Catholic (Chantilly, Virginia)
- College: Duke (2021–2022)
- NBA draft: 2022: 2nd round, 42nd overall pick
- Drafted by: New York Knicks
- Playing career: 2022–present

Career history
- 2022–2023: New York Knicks
- 2022–2023: →Westchester Knicks
- 2023–2025: Iowa Wolves
- 2025–2026: Sioux Falls Skyforce
- 2026: Miami Heat
- 2026: →Sioux Falls Skyforce
- 2026–present: Capital City Go-Go

Career highlights
- ACC All-Rookie Team (2022); McDonald's All-American (2021); Nike Hoop Summit (2021)
- Stats at NBA.com
- Stats at Basketball Reference
Medals
Men's basketball
Representing Lithuania

Trevor Jamaal Keels (born August 26, 2003) is an American professional basketball player for the Capital City Go-Go of the NBA G League. He played college basketball for the Duke Blue Devils. Keels was a consensus five-star recruit and one of the top shooting guards in the 2021 class. As of September 2026 he is a reserve for the Lithuania Men’s National Team for the upcoming 2027 FIBA World Cup as a neutralized citizen.

== High school career ==
Keels played basketball for Paul VI Catholic High School in Chantilly, Virginia, where he was teammates with his future college teammate Jeremy Roach. As a sophomore, he averaged 15.6 points, 3.9 rebounds and 2.3 assists per game, earning Washington Catholic Athletic Conference (WCAC) Co-Player of the Year honors. In his junior season, Keels led Paul VI to the Virginia Independent Schools Athletic Association Division I state title. As a senior, he averaged 28.7 points, 9.1 rebounds, 7.2 assists and 3.8 steals per game. He was named Virginia Gatorade Player of the Year and was selected to the McDonald's All-American Game, Jordan Brand Classic and Nike Hoop Summit rosters.

=== Recruiting ===
Keels received his first NCAA Division I scholarship offer from Wake Forest, three games into his high school career. He finished as a consensus five-star recruit and one of the top shooting guards in the 2021 class. On April 2, 2021, Keels committed to playing college basketball for Duke over offers from Virginia, Villanova and Kentucky.

College recruiting
Name	Hometown	School	Height	Weight	Commit date
Trevor Keels; SG	Clinton, MD	Paul VI Catholic (VA)	6 ft 5 in (1.96 m)	210 lb (95 kg)	Apr 2, 2021
Trevor Keels; SG	Recruit ratings: Rivals: 247Sports: ESPN: (90)				
Overall recruit ranking: Rivals: 22 247Sports: 22 ESPN: 23
Note: In many cases, Scout, Rivals, 247Sports, On3, and ESPN may conflict in their listings of height and weight.; In these cases, the average was taken. ESPN grades are on a 100-point scale.; Sources: "Duke 2021 Basketball Commitments". Rivals.; "2021 Duke Blue Devils Recruiting Class". ESPN.; "2021 Team Ranking". Rivals.

== College career ==
In his collegiate debut, a 79–71 win against Kentucky, Keels scored 25 points. He averaged 11.5 points, 3.4 rebounds and 2.7 assists in his first season with Duke. Keels was named to the ACC All-Rookie Team. Following his freshman season, Keels announced his intention to enter the 2022 NBA draft. On June 1, 2022, he announced he would remain in the draft and forego his remaining college eligibility.

== Professional career ==
=== New York / Westchester Knicks (2022–2023) ===
Keels was selected with the 42nd overall pick by the New York Knicks in the 2022 NBA draft. On July 10, 2022, Keels signed a two-way contract with the Knicks. On February 23, 2023, the Knicks converted his deal to a 10-day contract, which expired on March 5 and he returned to the Westchester Knicks of the NBA G League. On March 12, Keels signed a two-way contract with the New York Knicks.

On July 19, 2023, Keels signed another two-way contract with the Knicks, but was waived on July 26.

=== Iowa Wolves (2023–2025) ===
On September 28, 2023, Keels signed with the Minnesota Timberwolves, but was waived on October 20. Nine days later, he joined the Iowa Wolves.

On September 25, 2024, Keels re-signed with the Timberwolves, but was waived the next day. On October 25, he rejoined Iowa.

=== Miami Heat / Sioux Falls Skyforce (2025–2026) ===
On July 28, 2025, Keels' rights were acquired by the Sioux Falls Skyforce of the NBA G League. On January 9, 2026, Keels made all 12 of his three-point attempts and set the G League record for made threes in a game without a miss; he scored a total of 46 points in the game. He was named Rookie of the Week on January 13.

On February 18, 2026, Keels signed a two-way contract with the Miami Heat. He made eight appearances for Miami, averaging 1.0 point and 0.3 rebounds.

=== Capital City Go-Go (2026–present) ===
On September 17, 2026, Keels agreed to an Exhibit 10 contract with the Washington Wizards.

== Career statistics ==
Legend
GP	Games played	GS	Games started	MPG	Minutes per game
FG%	Field goal percentage	3P%	3-point field goal percentage	FT%	Free throw percentage
RPG	Rebounds per game	APG	Assists per game	SPG	Steals per game
BPG	Blocks per game	PPG	Points per game	**Bold**	Career high

=== NBA ===
Year	Team	GP	GS	MPG	FG%	3P%	FT%	RPG	APG	SPG	BPG	PPG
2022–23	New York	3	0	**2.7**	**.250**	**.250**	—	**.7**	.0	.0	.0	**1.0**
2025–26	Miami	**8**	0	1.9	**.250**	.222	—	.3	.0	**.1**	.0	**1.0**
Career		11	0	2.1	.250	.231	—	.4	.0	.1	.0	1.0

=== College ===
Year	Team	GP	GS	MPG	FG%	3P%	FT%	RPG	APG	SPG	BPG	PPG
2021–22	Duke	36	26	30.2	.419	.312	.670	3.4	2.7	1.2	.1	11.5
