= Jahmyl Telfort =

Canadian basketball player (born 2001)

No. 19 – San Diego Clippers
- Position: Small forward
- League: NBA G League

Personal information
- Born: April 30, 2001 (age 25) Montreal, Quebec, Canada
- Listed height: 6 ft 7 in (2.01 m)
- Listed weight: 220 lb (100 kg)

Career information
- High school: New Hampton School (New Hampton, New Hampshire)
- College: Northeastern (2020–2023); Butler (2023–2025)
- NBA draft: 2025: undrafted
- Playing career: 2025–present

Career history
- 2025: Los Angeles Clippers
- 2025: →San Diego Clippers
- 2026–present: San Diego Clippers

Career highlights
- Third-team All-Big East (2025); Third-team All-CAA (2023); CAA Sixth Man of the Year (2021); CAA All-Freshman team (2021)
- Stats at NBA.com
- Stats at Basketball Reference

Jahmyl Telfort (born April 30, 2001) is a Canadian professional basketball player for the San Diego Clippers of the NBA G League. He played college basketball for the Northeastern Huskies and Butler Bulldogs.

== College career ==
Telfort began his collegiate career at Northeastern and averaged 12.6 points per game as a sophomore. He averaged 16.3 points and 4.5 rebounds per game as a junior, earning Third Team All-CAA honors. Following the season he opted to transfer to Butler. As a senior, Telfort averaged 13.9 points, 4.9 rebounds and 3.0 assists per game, helping Butler reach the NIT. Following the season, he declared for the 2024 NBA draft before withdrawing and returning to school. In his final season, Telfort averaged 16 points, 4.7 rebounds, 3.4 assists and one steal per game. He was named to the Third Team All-Big East.

== Professional career ==
Undrafted after the close of his college career, Telfort signed a contract with the Los Angeles Clippers on June 27, 2025. On October 18, the Clippers converted Telfort's contract into a two-way contract. In six games with the San Diego Clippers, he averaged 12.0 points, 3.0 rebounds, and 2.0 assists per game; in eight games for Los Angeles, he logged averages of 0.1 points, 0.4 rebounds, and 0.1 assists. Telfort was waived by the Clippers following the signing of RayJ Dennis on December 5.

== Career statistics ==
Legend
GP	Games played	GS	Games started	MPG	Minutes per game
FG%	Field goal percentage	3P%	3-point field goal percentage	FT%	Free throw percentage
RPG	Rebounds per game	APG	Assists per game	SPG	Steals per game
BPG	Blocks per game	PPG	Points per game	**Bold**	Career high

=== NBA ===
Year	Team	GP	GS	MPG	FG%	3P%	FT%	RPG	APG	SPG	BPG	PPG
2025–26	L.A. Clippers	8	0	4.0	.000	.000	.250	.4	.1	.1	.0	.1
Career		8	0	4.0	.000	.000	.250	.4	.1	.1	.0	.1
