= Sean Pedulla =

American basketball player (born 2002)

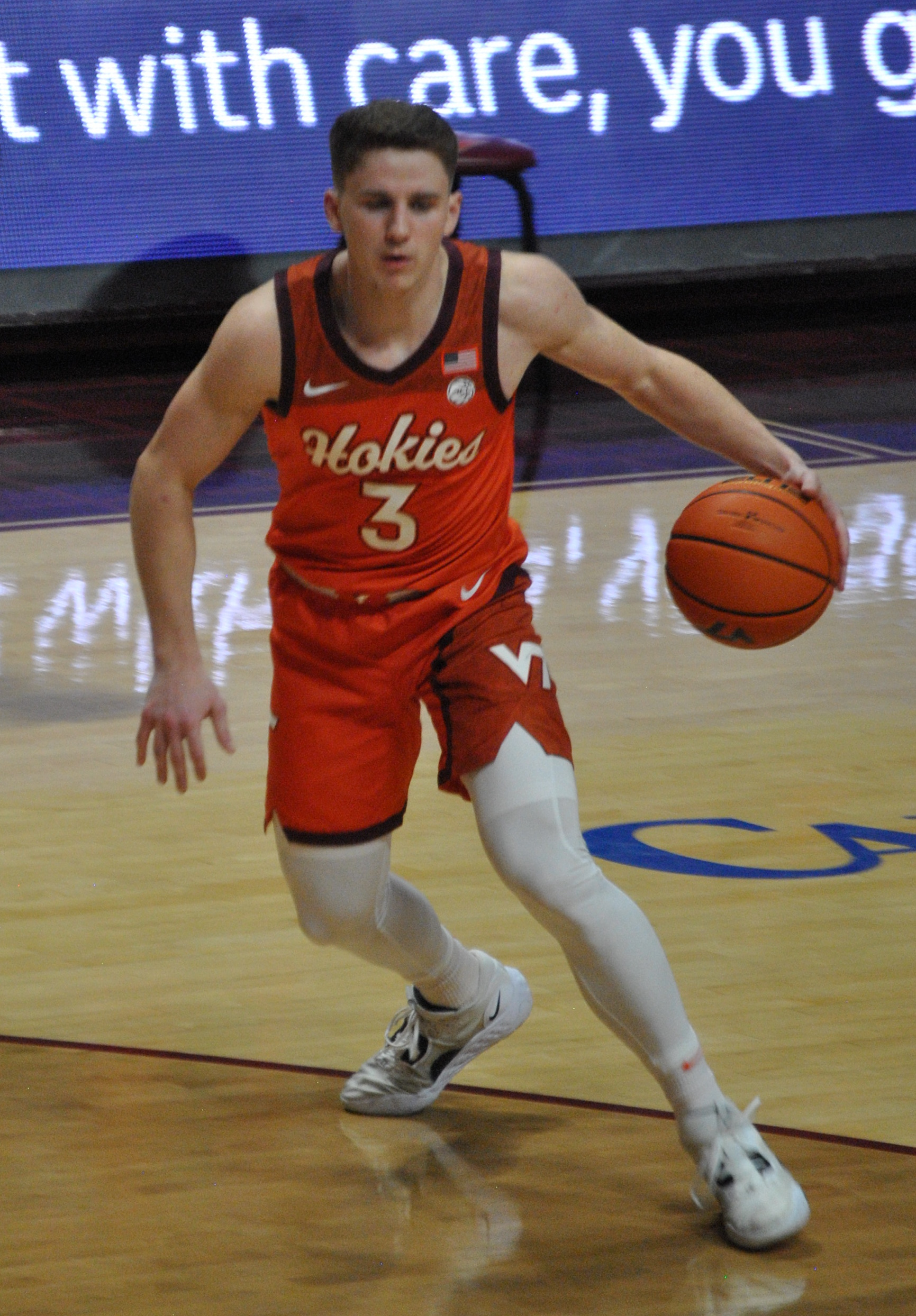
- Pedulla in 2022

No. 3 – Sacramento Kings
- Position: Point guard
- League: NBA

Personal information
- Born: October 10, 2002 (age 24) Edmond, Oklahoma, U.S.
- Listed height: 6 ft 1 in (1.85 m)
- Listed weight: 197 lb (89 kg)

Career information
- High school: Edmond Memorial (Edmond, Oklahoma)
- College: Virginia Tech (2021–2024); Ole Miss (2024–2025)
- NBA draft: 2025: undrafted
- Playing career: 2025–present

Career history
- 2025–2026: Rip City Remix
- 2026: Los Angeles Clippers
- 2026: →San Diego Clippers
- 2026–present: Sacramento Kings
- 2026–present: →Stockton Kings

Career highlights
- NBA G League Rookie of the Year (2026); NBA G League All-Rookie Team (2026); Third-team All-ACC (2024); Third-team All-SEC (2025)
- Stats at NBA.com
- Stats at Basketball Reference

Sean Pedulla (born October 10, 2002) is an American professional basketball player for the Sacramento Kings of the National Basketball Association (NBA), on a two-way contract with the Stockton Kings of the NBA G League. He played college basketball for the Virginia Tech Hokies and Ole Miss Rebels.

== High school career ==
Pedulla attended Edmond Memorial High School in Edmond, Oklahoma. During his junior year, he averaged 17.2 points per game while leading Edmond Memorial to the 2020 state championship, which was cancelled by the COVID-19 pandemic. This performance led him to be named to The Oklahoman's Super 5 third-team. In July 2020, Pedulla posted 31 points during an Oklahoma AAU game, which captured the attention of numerous Division I programs. In the week following the game, Pedulla received offers from Minnesota, Samford, Saint Louis, Tulsa, and Virginia Tech. A few days prior to the game, he received an offer from Louisiana Tech.

Ranked as the nation's 141st-best prospect and the 25th-best point guard in the 2021 class per 247Sports, he committed to play college basketball at Virginia Tech on October 19, 2020, over offers from Minnesota and Oklahoma State. In his senior year, he again led Edmond Memorial to the championship game and earned a first-team Super 5 selection from The Oklahoman.

== College career ==
=== Virginia Tech ===
In his freshman year, Pedulla did not start a single one of Virginia Tech's 36 games and averaged 5.4 points. However, he managed to shoot 45% from beyond the three-point arc, and scored a then-career high 19 points off the bench in the 2022 NCAA tournament against Texas.

Pedulla became the starting point guard for the team during his sophomore season and quickly became a leading contributor. Early on, he emerged as one of the top ACC point guards, and led the team in scoring and assists through their hot 11–1 run. He started all 34 games for the Hokies, scoring double-digit points in 31 of those, with his highest single-game point total being 25 against Florida State. Averaging 15.0 points per game, Pedulla was the Hokies' number two scorer that season.

He improved upon this in his junior season. On January 15, 2024, Pedulla was named the Atlantic Coast Conference Player of the Week after putting up 32 points in a win against Clemson, following it up with a 33-point performance against Miami, a new career high. At the end of the season, Pedulla earned third-team All-ACC honors, finishing with an average of 16.4 points per game.

=== Ole Miss ===
On March 24, 2024, Pedulla entered the transfer portal. A month later, on April 24, Pedulla announced that he was transferring to Ole Miss over Oklahoma and Creighton. Pedulla was solid early for the Rebels, scoring 18 points in a half in the December 21 game against Queens. On February 27, 2025, Pedulla was named a finalist for the Howell Trophy, awarded to the best college basketball player in the state of Mississippi. Two days later, Pedulla hit a game-winning three-pointer against his home state team Oklahoma, capping off a 26-point day to solidify Ole Miss' bid to the 2025 NCAA tournament. On March 10, Pedulla was named a third-team All-SEC selection. During Ole Miss' opening game in the 2025 SEC tournament, Pedulla hit the game-winning three-pointer to secure an 83-80 win over Arkansas, allowing the Rebels to advance to the quarterfinals.

== Professional career ==
=== Rip City Remix (2025–2026) ===
After going undrafted in the 2025 NBA draft, Pedulla joined the Portland Trail Blazers for the 2025 NBA Summer League. For the 2025–26 season, he was added to the roster of the Blazers' NBA G League affiliate, the Rip City Remix.

=== Los Angeles Clippers (2026) ===
On February 20, 2026, Pedulla signed on a two-way contract with the Los Angeles Clippers. He made his NBA debut on March 11 against the Minnesota Timberwolves, in which he had six points, three assists and one rebound in six minutes. On April 2, Pedulla was named the NBA G League Rookie Of The Year, having averaged 23.6 points, 6.7 assists, 5.0 rebounds, and 1.6 steals across 28 total appearances. He logged seven appearances for the Clippers, recording averages of 1.9 points, 0.4 rebounds, and 0.7 assists. Pedulla was waived by Los Angeles on August 5.

On August 17, 2026, Pedulla signed a two-way contract with the Houston Rockets. On October 19, Pedulla was waived as a part of final roster cuts.

=== Sacramento Kings (2026–present) ===
On October 23, 2026, Pedulla signed a two-way contract with the Sacramento Kings.

== Career statistics ==
Legend
GP	Games played	GS	Games started	MPG	Minutes per game
FG%	Field goal percentage	3P%	3-point field goal percentage	FT%	Free throw percentage
RPG	Rebounds per game	APG	Assists per game	SPG	Steals per game
BPG	Blocks per game	PPG	Points per game	**Bold**	Career high

=== NBA ===
Year	Team	GP	GS	MPG	FG%	3P%	FT%	RPG	APG	SPG	BPG	PPG
2025–26	L.A. Clippers	7	0	4.4	.333	.300	—	.4	.7	.0	.0	1.9
Career		7	0	4.4	.333	.300	—	.4	.7	.0	.0	1.9

=== College ===
Year	Team	GP	GS	MPG	FG%	3P%	FT%	RPG	APG	SPG	BPG	PPG
2021–22	Virginia Tech	**36**	0	12.9	.428	**.447**	**.900**	1.2	1.3	.6	.0	5.4
2022–23	Virginia Tech	34	34	**35.6**	.416	.344	.859	3.6	3.8	1.2	**.2**	15.0
2023–24	Virginia Tech	32	32	32.2	.424	.325	.801	**4.3**	**4.6**	1.2	.1	**16.4**
2024–25	Ole Miss	**36**	**36**	32.8	**.441**	.392	.825	3.5	3.8	**1.9**	**.2**	15.4
Career		138	102	28.2	.427	.367	.831	3.1	3.3	1.2	.1	12.9
