= Yanic Konan Niederhäuser =

Swiss basketball player (born 2003)

No. 14 – Los Angeles Clippers
- Position: Center
- League: NBA

Personal information
- Born: 14 March 2003 (age 23) Bern, Switzerland
- Listed height: 6 ft 11 in (2.11 m)
- Listed weight: 242 lb (110 kg)

Career information
- College: Northern Illinois (2022–2024); Penn State (2024–2025)
- NBA draft: 2025: 1st round, 30th overall pick
- Drafted by: Los Angeles Clippers
- Playing career: 2021–present

Career history
- 2021–2022: Ehingen Urspring
- 2025–present: Los Angeles Clippers
- 2025–2026: →San Diego Clippers
- Stats at NBA.com
- Stats at Basketball Reference

Yanic Konan Niederhäuser (born 14 March 2003) is a Swiss professional basketball player for the Los Angeles Clippers of the National Basketball Association (NBA). He played college basketball for the Northern Illinois Huskies and Penn State Nittany Lions.

== Early life and high school career ==
Niederhäuser was born in Bern, Switzerland, to a German-speaking father and a mother of Ivorian descent. His middle name, Konan, was chosen by his father after the titular character played by Arnold Schwarzenegger in the film Conan the Barbarian; Niederhäuser includes his middle name on his jersey. Niederhäuser was raised in Fräschels and started playing basketball at the age of 10 in Neuchâtel.

During the 2021–22 season, Niederhäuser played for Ehingen Urspring, a professional German club, on both its youth team and its German Pro A League squad. After the season, he committed to play college basketball in the United States for the Northern Illinois Huskies.

== College career ==
=== Northern Illinois ===
As a freshman in 2022–23, Niederhäuser played in 20 games with two starts, averaging 2.2 points and 1.5 rebounds per game. During the 2023–24 season, he made 26 starts, averaging 7.3 points and 4.4 rebounds per game. After the 2023–24 season, Niederhäuser entered his name into the NCAA transfer portal.

=== Penn State ===
Niederhäuser transferred to play for the Penn State Nittany Lions. On 30 January 2025, he notched 21 points, five rebounds and a block in a loss to Ohio State. During the 2024–25 season, Niederhauser recorded 12.9 points, 6.3 rebounds and 2.3 blocks per game, while shooting 61% from the field, where after the season he entered his name into the 2025 NBA draft. He also accepted invites to participate in NBA G League Elite Camp and the NBA scouting combine.

== Professional career ==
On 25 June 2025, Niederhäuser was selected last in the first round, with the 30th overall pick by the Los Angeles Clippers in the 2025 NBA draft. He made 41 appearances for Los Angeles during his rookie campaign, averaging 4.3 points, 2.9 rebounds, and 0.3 assists. On 6 March 2026, it was announced that Niederhauser would require season-ending surgery to repair a Lisfranc injury in his right foot.

== National team career ==
Niederhäuser first represented Switzerland at the youth level during the 2021 FIBA U18 European Challengers competition. He averaged 10.3 points, 7.7 rebounds and 2.7 blocks per game by the end of the tournament. In 2022, with the U20 national team at the 2022 FIBA U20 European Championship Division B, he averaged 6.6 points, 4.3 rebounds and 1.7 blocks during the event. In July 2023, Niederhäuser returned to the U20 national team for the 2023 FIBA U20 European Championship Division B. He finished with averages of 7.7 points, 4.4 rebounds and two blocks per game.

Following Niederhäuser's stint at the youth level in July 2023, he was named to the senior Switzerland national team later that month, for the third round of EuroBasket 2025 pre-qualifiers. In his two games against Kosovo and Denmark, he averaged 11.5 points, three rebounds and two blocks per game.

== Career statistics ==
Legend
GP	Games played	GS	Games started	MPG	Minutes per game
FG%	Field goal percentage	3P%	3-point field goal percentage	FT%	Free throw percentage
RPG	Rebounds per game	APG	Assists per game	SPG	Steals per game
BPG	Blocks per game	PPG	Points per game	**Bold**	Career high

=== NBA ===
Year	Team	GP	GS	MPG	FG%	3P%	FT%	RPG	APG	SPG	BPG	PPG
2025–26	L.A. Clippers	41	0	10.3	.640	.200	.758	2.9	.3	.1	.7	4.3
Career		41	0	10.3	.640	.200	.758	2.9	.3	.1	.7	4.3

=== College ===
Year	Team	GP	GS	MPG	FG%	3P%	FT%	RPG	APG	SPG	BPG	PPG
2022–23	Northern Illinois	20	2	7.6	.429	.188	**.800**	1.5	.2	.2	.5	2.2
2023–24	Northern Illinois	27	26	19.6	.541	**.292**	.610	4.4	.3	.2	2.1	7.3
2024–25	Penn State	**29**	**29**	**25.1**	**.611**	.091	.664	**6.3**	**.8**	**.7**	**2.3**	**12.9**
Career		76	57	18.6	.570	.216	.648	4.4	.4	.4	1.8	8.1
