= 2025 NBA draft =

79th edition of the NBA draft

General information
- Sport: Basketball
- Date: June 25–26, 2025
- Location: Barclays Center (Brooklyn, New York)
- Networks: ESPN; ABC (first round only)

Overview
- 59 total selections in 2 rounds
- League: National Basketball Association
- First selection: Cooper Flagg (Dallas Mavericks)

The 2025 NBA draft was the 79th edition of the National Basketball Association's (NBA) annual draft. Like the 2024 draft, this draft took place over two nights. The draft consisted of 59 picks, rather than 60, because the New York Knicks forfeited a second-round pick for a free agency violation in 2022.

The first round of the draft took place on June 25, while the second took place on June 26. Both rounds were held at Barclays Center in Brooklyn, New York. The time between second-round picks remained four minutes, a change that was made from the previous year's draft.

The Dallas Mavericks took power forward Cooper Flagg out of Duke University as the first overall selection. The Mavericks won the draft lottery with only a 1.8% chance and previously winning a coin toss for a higher placement in draft total odds over the Chicago Bulls, who finished the season with the same record as the Mavericks.

== Draft selections ==
PG	Point guard	SG	Shooting guard	SF	Small forward	PF	Power forward	C	Center

^{#}	Denotes player who has never appeared in an NBA regular-season or playoff game
^{~}	Denotes player who has been selected as Rookie of the Year

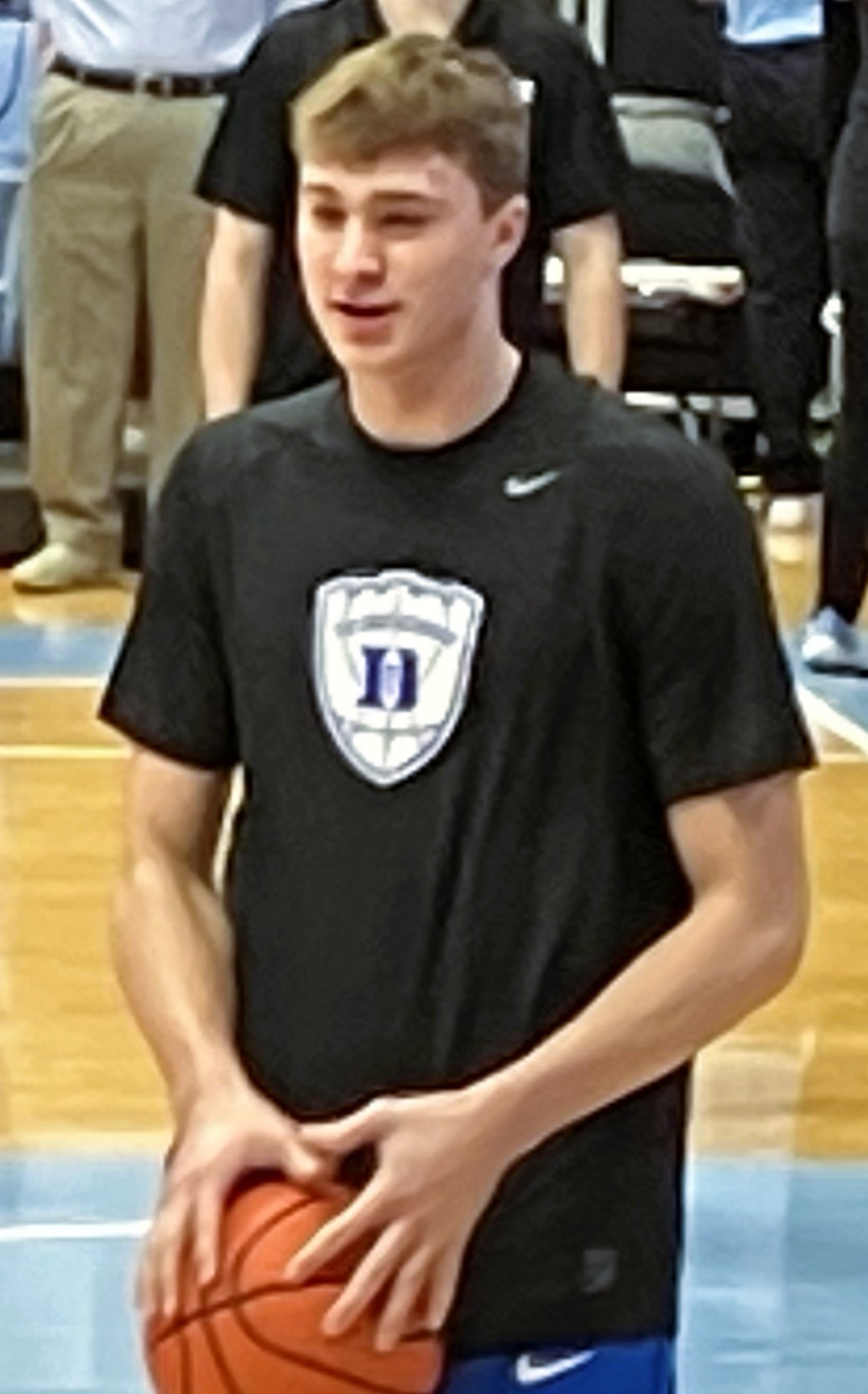
Cooper Flagg was selected 1st overall by the Dallas Mavericks.

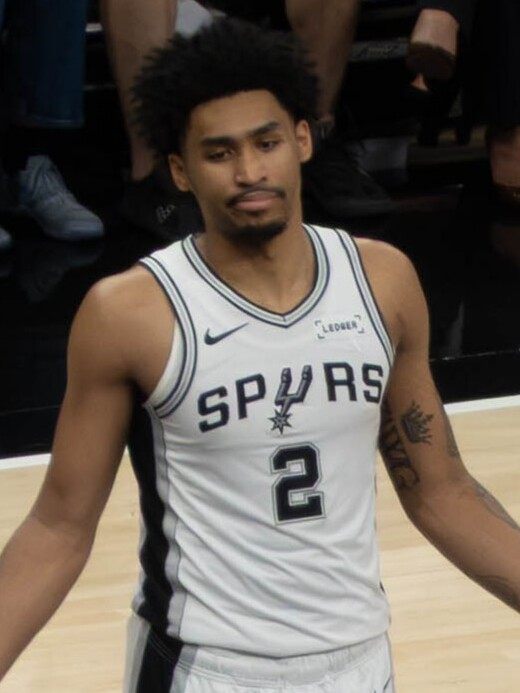
Dylan Harper was selected 2nd overall by the San Antonio Spurs.

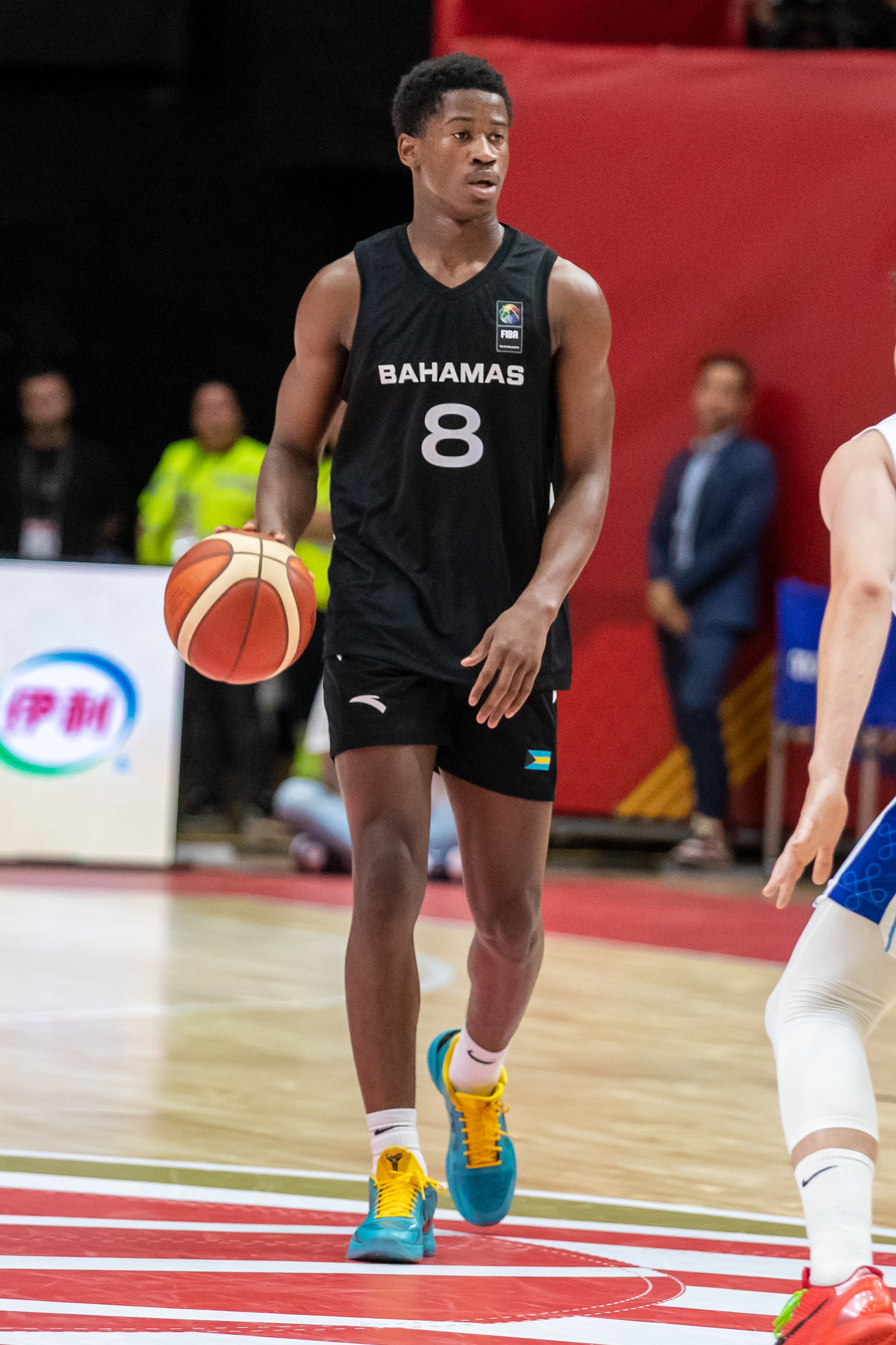
V. J. Edgecombe was selected 3rd overall by the Philadelphia 76ers.

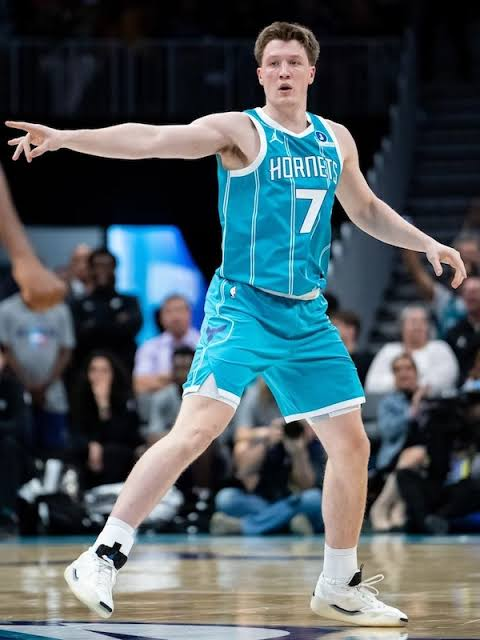
Kon Knueppel was selected 4th overall by the Charlotte Hornets.

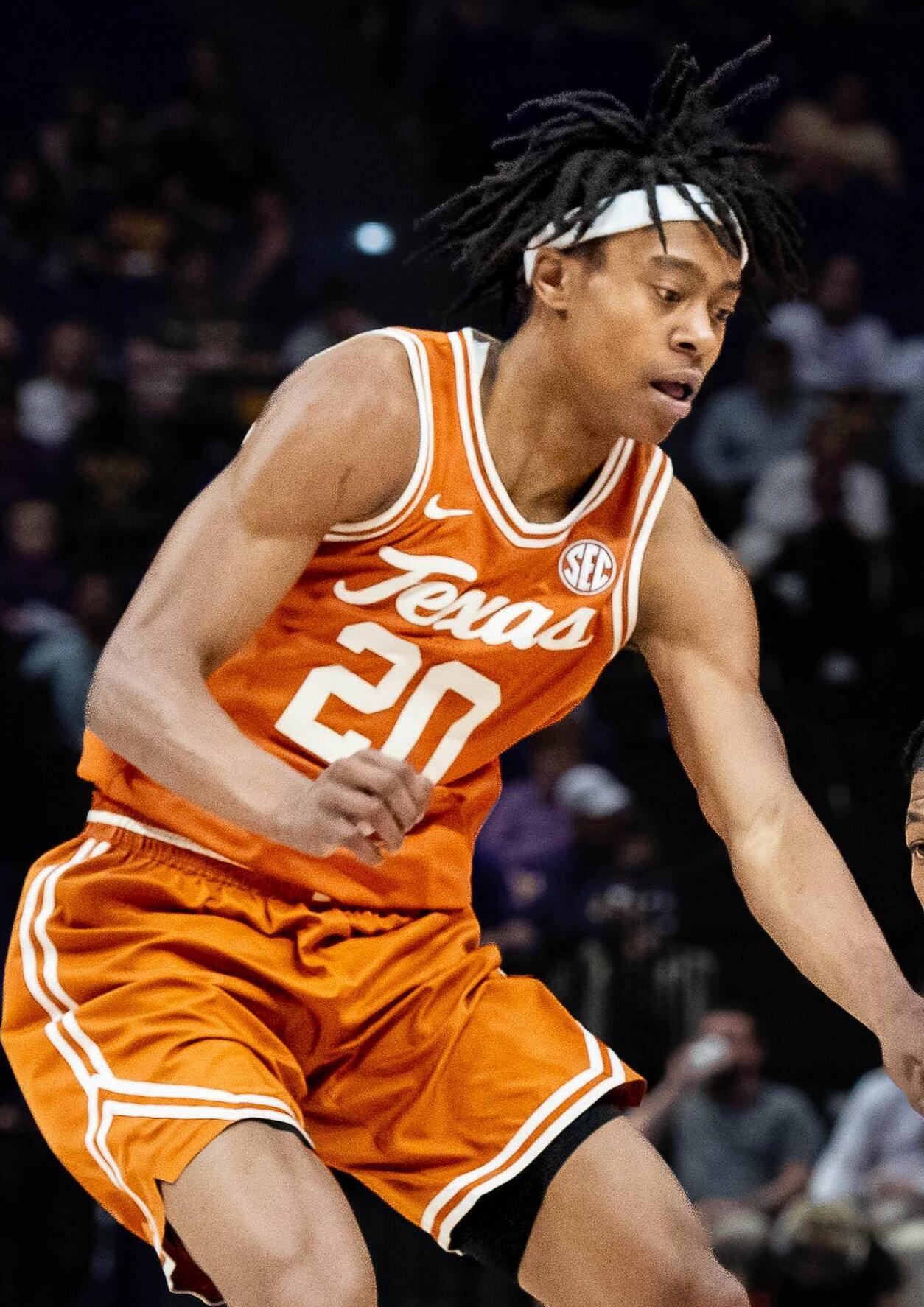
Tre Johnson was selected 6th overall by the Washington Wizards.

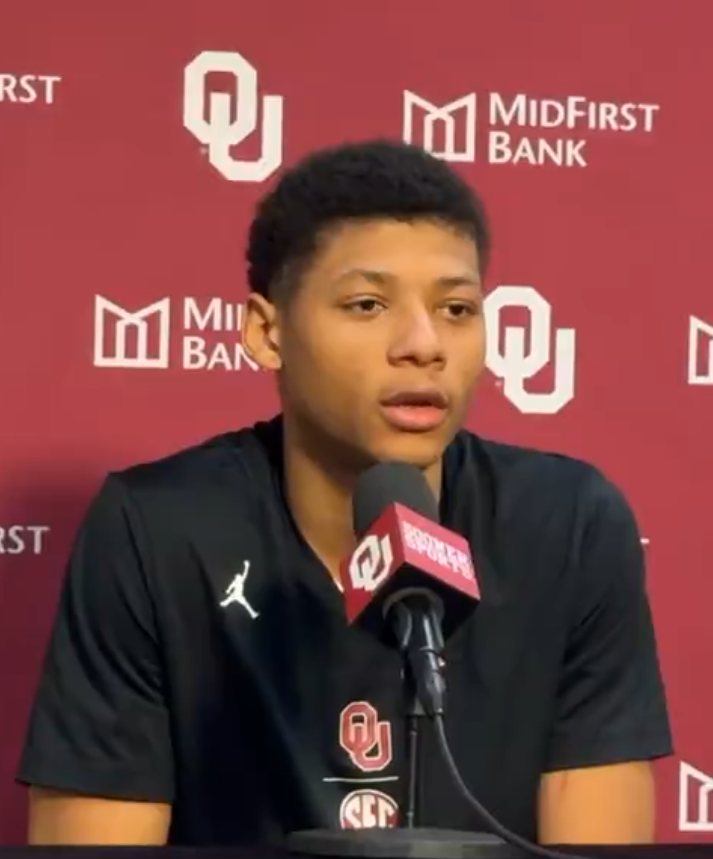
Jeremiah Fears was selected 7th overall by the New Orleans Pelicans.

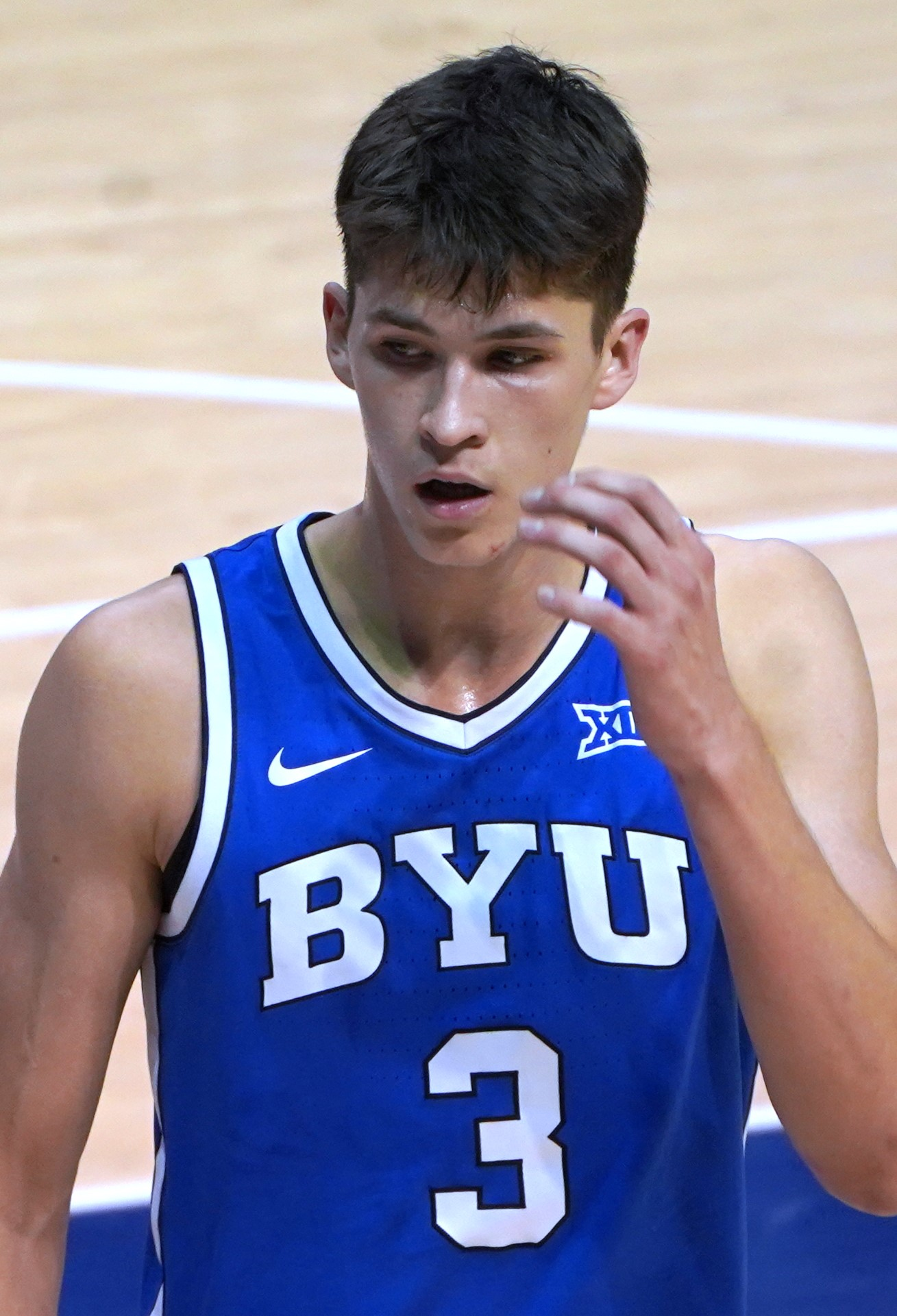
Egor Dëmin was selected 8th overall by the Brooklyn Nets.

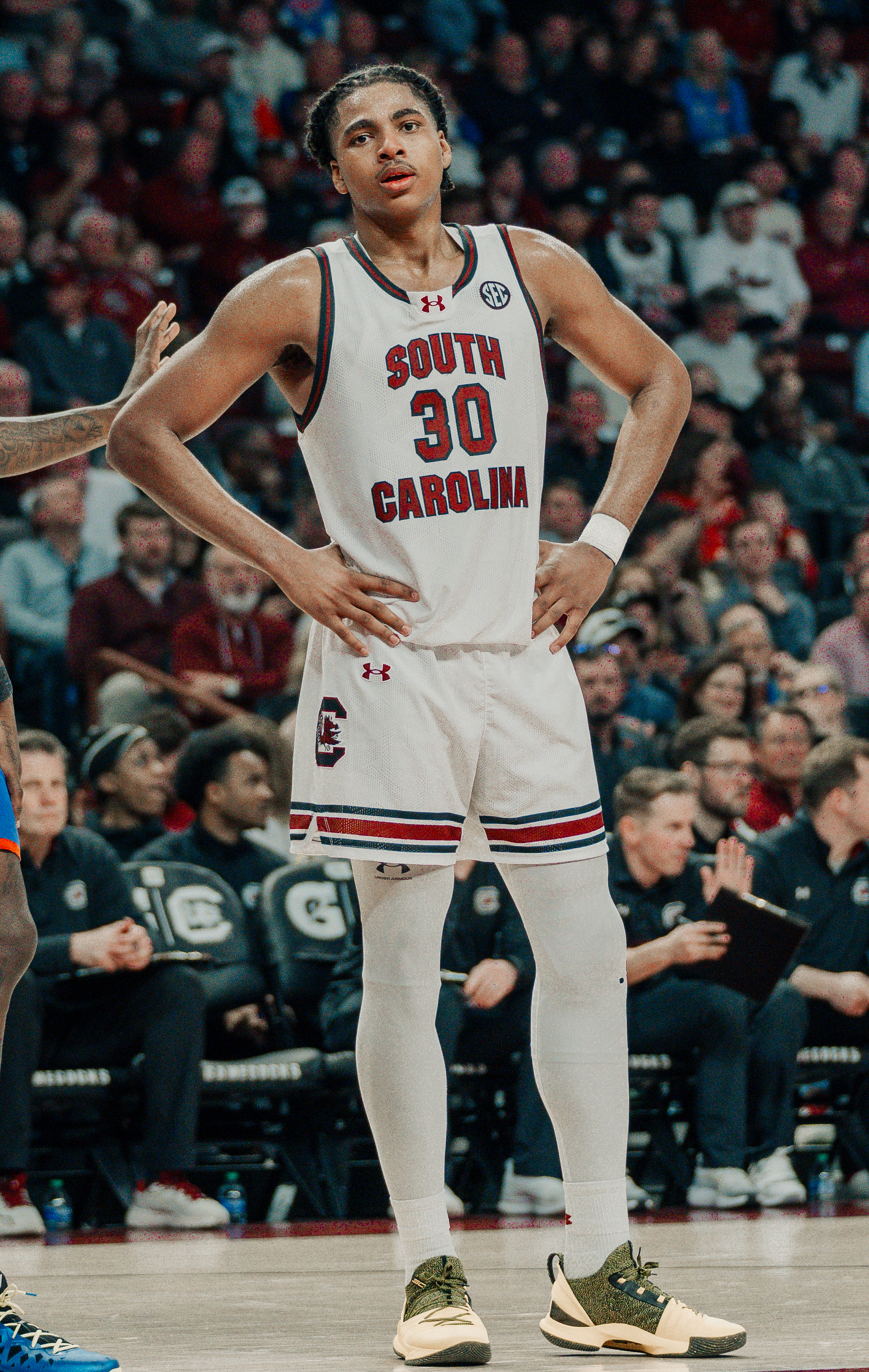
Collin Murray-Boyles was selected 9th overall by the Toronto Raptors.

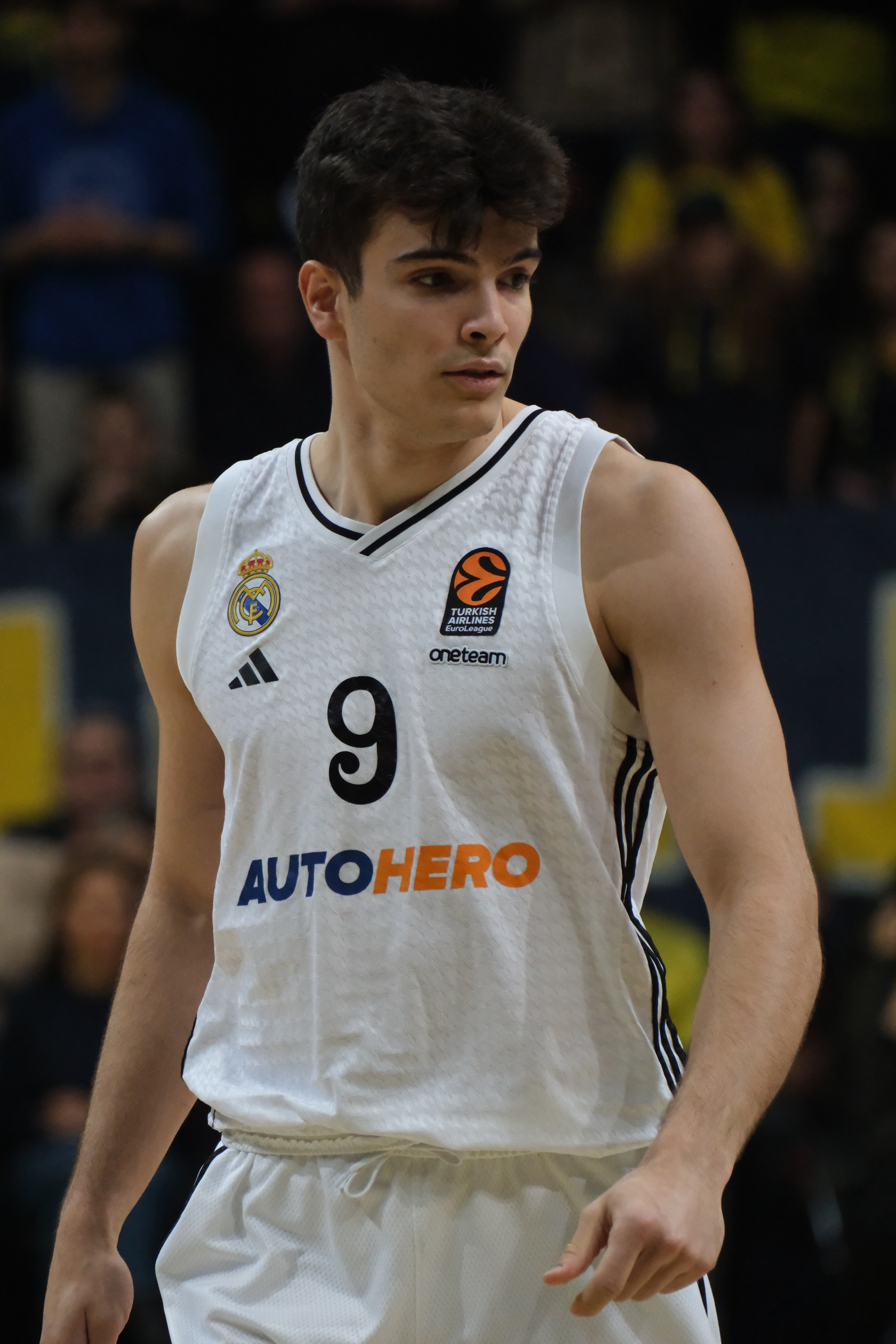
Hugo González was selected 28th overall by the Boston Celtics.

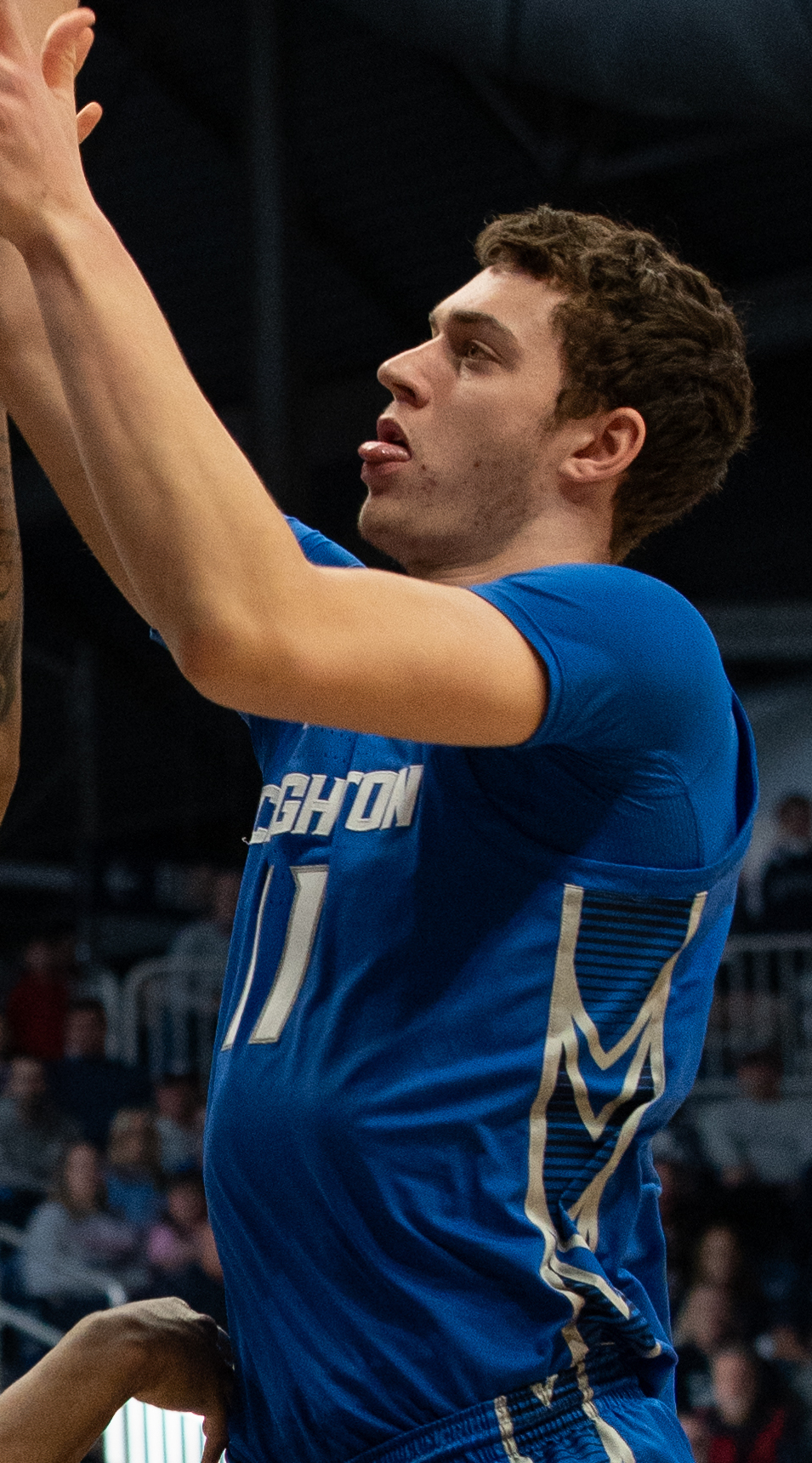
Ryan Kalkbrenner was selected 34th overall by the Charlotte Hornets.

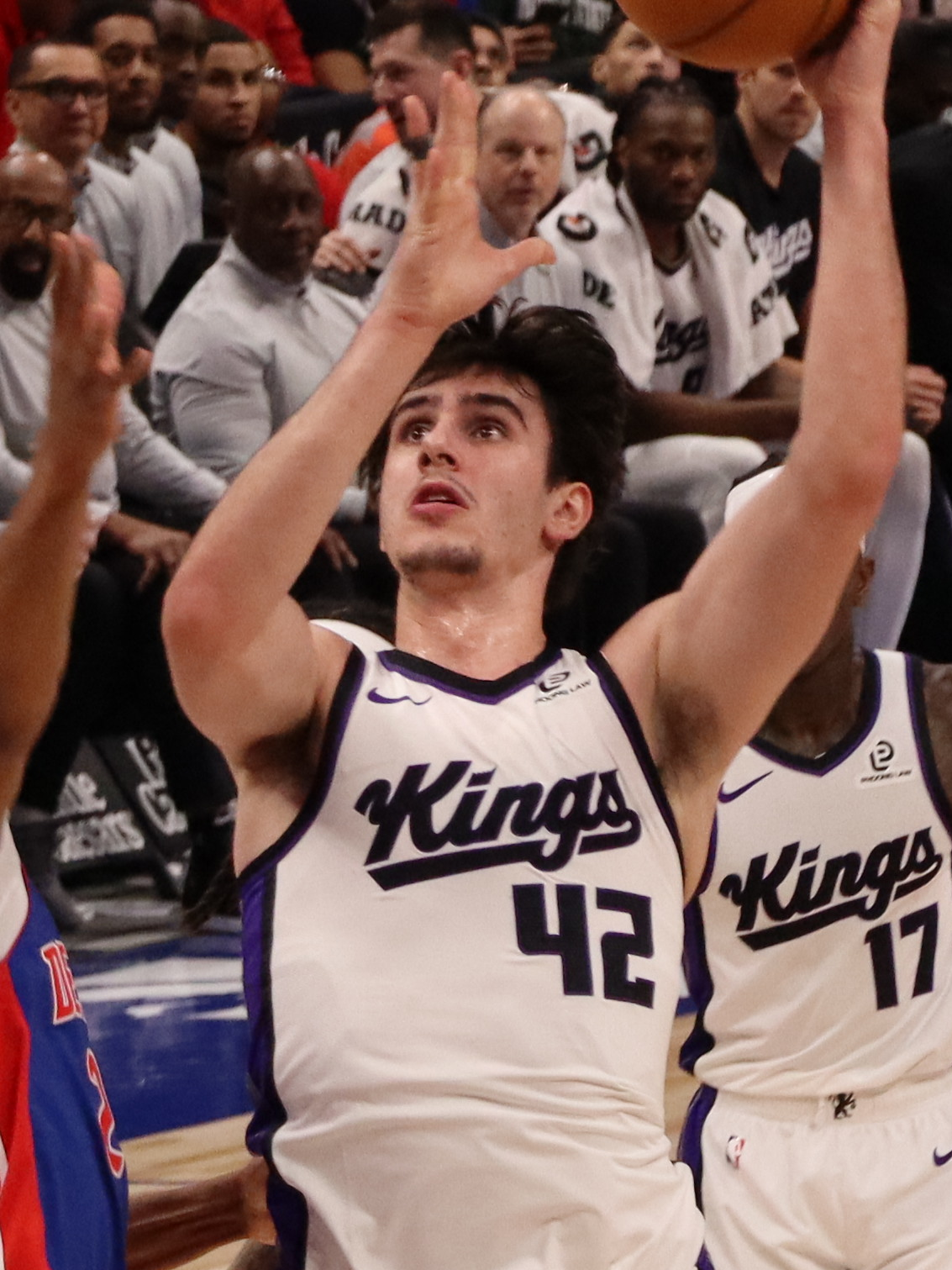
Maxime Raynaud was selected 42nd overall by the Sacramento Kings.

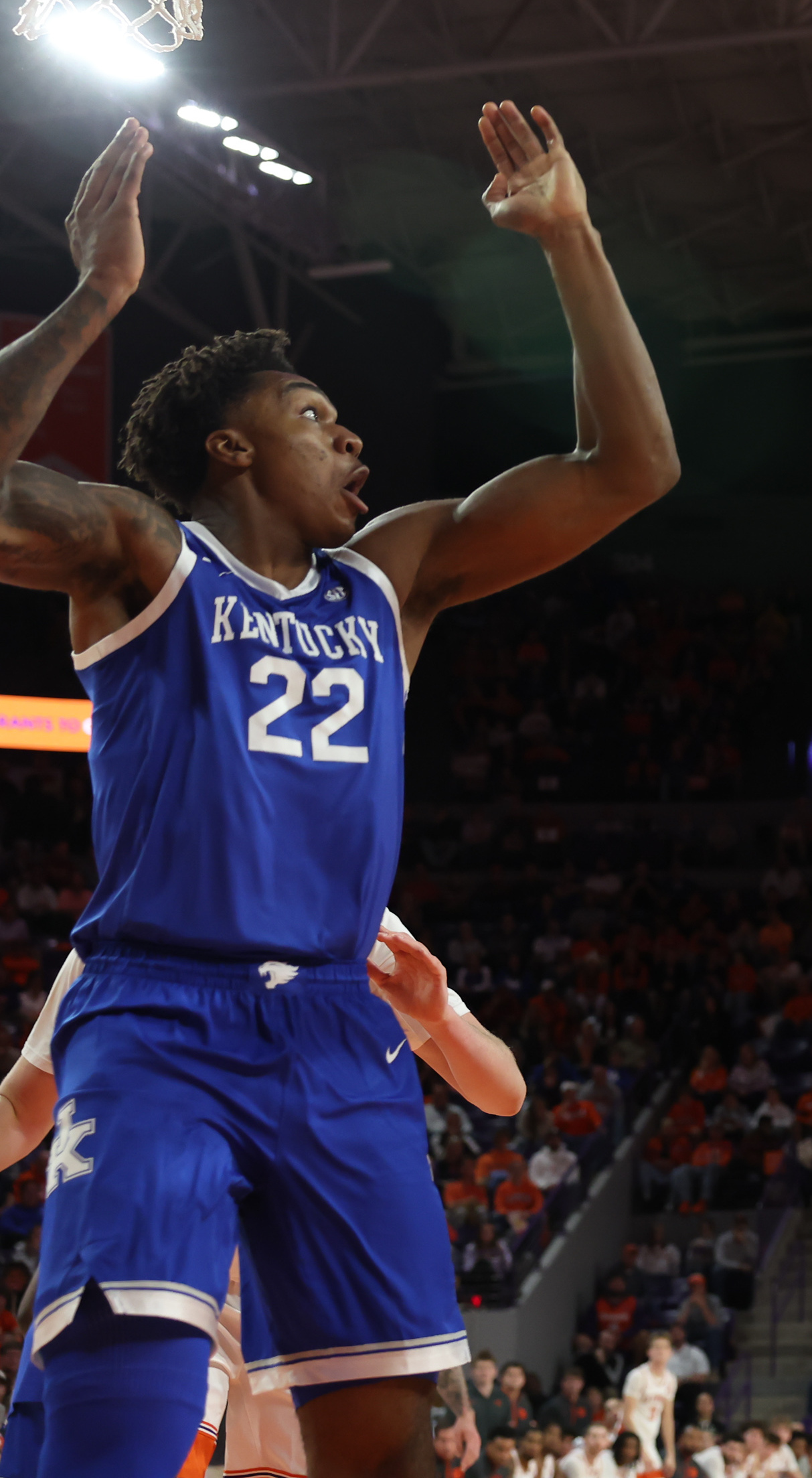
Amari Williams was selected 46th overall by the Orlando Magic.

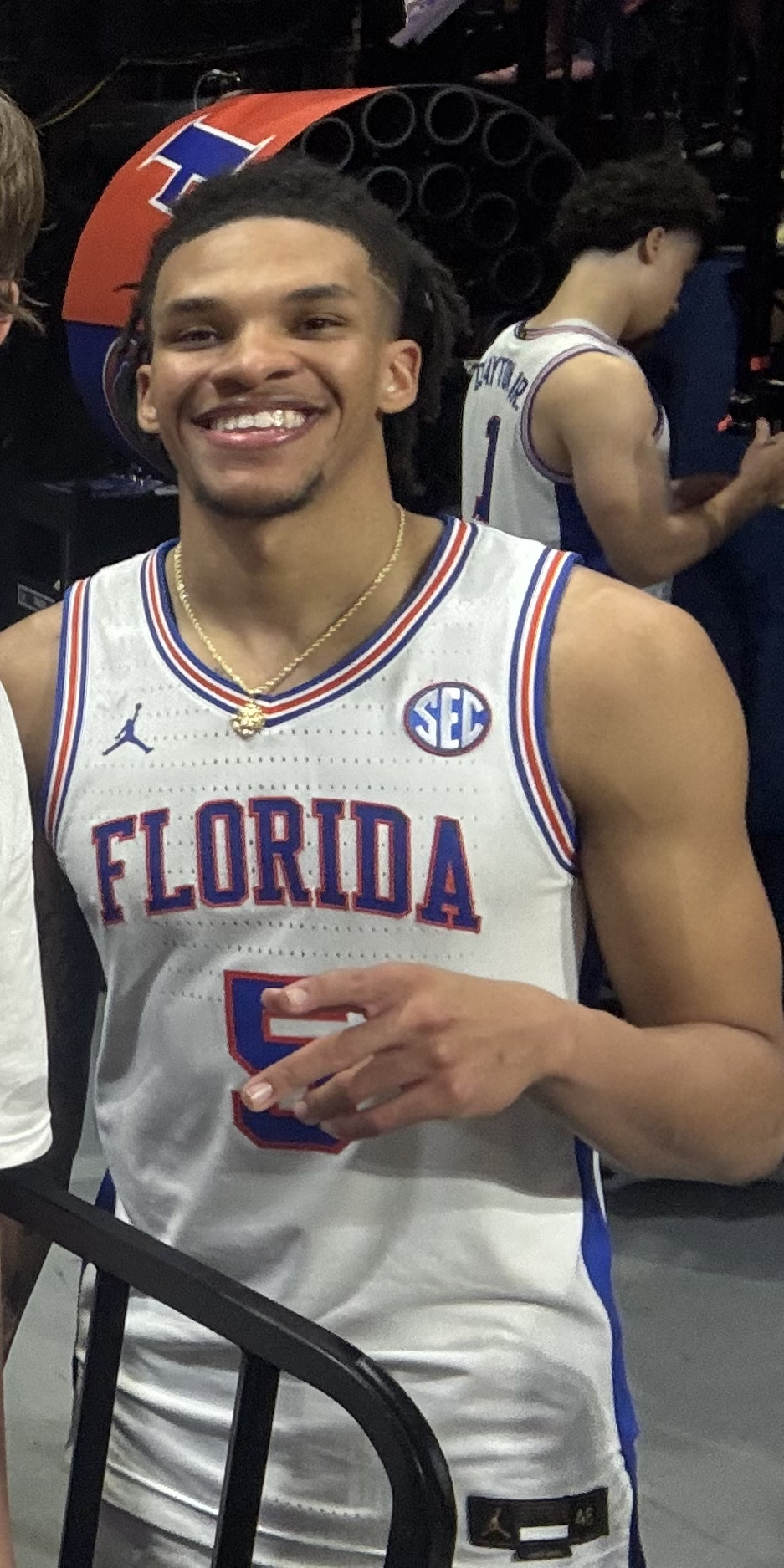
Will Richard was selected 56th overall by the Memphis Grizzlies.

Rnd.	Pick	Player	Pos.	Nationality (Note: Nationality indicates the player's national team or representative nationality. If a player has not competed at the international level, then the nationality indicates the national team which the player is eligible to represent according to FIBA rules.)	Team	School / club team
1	1	Cooper Flagg^{~}	SF	United States	Dallas Mavericks	Duke (Fr.)
1	2	Dylan Harper	SG/PG	United States	San Antonio Spurs	Rutgers (Fr.)
1	3	V. J. Edgecombe	SG	Bahamas	Philadelphia 76ers	Baylor (Fr.)
1	4	Kon Knueppel	SF/SG	United States	Charlotte Hornets	Duke (Fr.)
1	5	Ace Bailey	SF	United States	Utah Jazz	Rutgers (Fr.)
1	6	Tre Johnson	SG	United States	Washington Wizards	Texas (Fr.)
1	7	Jeremiah Fears	PG	United States	New Orleans Pelicans	Oklahoma (Fr.)
1	8	Egor Dëmin	PG	Russia	Brooklyn Nets	BYU (Fr.)
1	9	Collin Murray-Boyles	PF	United States	Toronto Raptors	South Carolina (So.)
1	10	Khaman Maluach	C	South Sudan	Houston Rockets (from Phoenix via Brooklyn, (Note: February 9, 2023: Phoenix Suns to Brooklyn Nets (four-team trade with Indiana and Milwaukee): Phoenix acquired Kevin Durant and T. J. Warren; Brooklyn acquired Mikal Bridges, Cameron Johnson, Draft rights to Juan Pablo Vaulet (2015 No. 39), 2023, 2025, 2027, and 2029 PHX first-round pick, 2028 right to swap first-round picks, 2028 MIL second-round pick, and 2029 second-round pick; Indiana acquired George Hill, Serge Ibaka, Jordan Nwora, 2023 second-round pick, 2024 MIL second-round pick, 2025 IND second-round pick, and cash considerations; Milwaukee acquired Jae Crowder) (Note: June 26, 2024: Brooklyn Nets to Houston Rockets: Brooklyn acquired 2025 BKN first-round pick swap right relinquished and 2026 BKN first-round pick returned; Houston acquired 2025 PHX first-round pick swap right, 2027 PHX first-round pick, 2029 first-round pick, and 2029 first-round pick swap right) traded to Phoenix) (Note: July 6, 2025: Houston Rockets to Phoenix Suns (seven-team trade with Atlanta, Brooklyn, Golden State, LA Lakers and Minnesota): Houston acquired Clint Capela (sign-and-trade) and Kevin Durant; Phoenix acquired Dillon Brooks, Jalen Green, Daeqwon Plowden, draft rights to Koby Brea, draft rights to Rasheer Fleming, draft rights to Khaman Maluach, and 2026 second-round pick; Atlanta acquired David Roddy, 2031 second-round pick swap right, and cash considerations; Brooklyn acquired 2026 second-round pick and 2030 BOS second-round pick; Golden State acquired draft rights to Jahmai Mashack and draft rights to Alex Toohey; LA Lakers acquired draft rights to Adou Thiero; Minnesota acquired draft rights to Rocco Zikarsky, 2026 second-round pick, 2032 second-round pick, and cash considerations)	Duke (Fr.)
1	11	Cedric Coward	SG	United States	Portland Trail Blazers (traded to Memphis) (Note: June 25, 2025: Portland Trail Blazers to Memphis Grizzlies: Portland acquired draft rights to Yang Hansen, 2027 ATL second-round pick, 2028 ORL first-round pick, and 2028 SAC second-round pick; Memphis acquired draft rights to Cedric Coward)	Washington State (Sr.)
1	12	Noa Essengue	PF	France	Chicago Bulls	Ratiopharm Ulm (Germany)
1	13	Derik Queen	C	United States	Atlanta Hawks (from Sacramento, (Note: July 6, 2022: Sacramento Kings to Atlanta Hawks: Atlanta acquired Maurice Harkless, Justin Holiday, and 2025 protected first-round pick; Sacramento acquired Kevin Huerter) traded to New Orleans) (Note: June 25, 2025: Atlanta Hawks to New Orleans Pelicans: Atlanta acquired draft rights to Asa Newell and 2026 first-round pick; New Orleans acquired draft rights to Derik Queen)	Maryland (Fr.)
1	14	Carter Bryant	SF	United States	San Antonio Spurs (from Atlanta) (Note: June 30, 2022: Atlanta Hawks to San Antonio Spurs: San Antonio acquired Danilo Gallinari, 2023, 2025 and 2027 first-round picks, and 2026 rights to swap first-round picks; Atlanta acquired Dejounte Murray and Jock Landale)	Arizona (Fr.)
1	15	Thomas Sorber^{#}	C	United States	Oklahoma City Thunder (from Miami via the LA Clippers) (Note: July 6, 2019: Miami Heat to Los Angeles Clippers (four-team trade with Philadelphia and Portland): Miami acquired Jimmy Butler (sign and trade), Meyers Leonard, and cash considerations; LA Clippers acquired Maurice Harkless, Draft rights to Mathias Lessort (2017 No. 50), and 2025 MIA protected first-round pick; Philadelphia acquired Josh Richardson; Portland acquired Hassan Whiteside) (Note: July 10, 2019: Los Angeles Clippers to Oklahoma City Thunder: Oklahoma City acquired Shai Gilgeous-Alexander, Danilo Gallinari, 2022, 2024, and 2026 first-round selections, Miami's 2021 and 2023 first-round selections, and right to swap 2023 and 2025 first-round picks; L. A. Clippers acquired Paul George)	Georgetown (Fr.)
1	16	Yang Hansen	C	China	Memphis Grizzlies (from Orlando, (Note: June 15, 2025: Orlando Magic to Memphis Grizzlies: Orlando acquired Desmond Bane; Memphis acquired Cole Anthony, Kentavious Caldwell-Pope, 2025 ORL first-round pick (No. 16), 2026 PHX first-round pick, 2028 first-round pick, 2029 protected first-round pick swap right, and 2030 ORL first-round pick) traded to Portland)	Qingdao Eagles (China)
1	17	Joan Beringer	C	France	Minnesota Timberwolves (from Detroit via New York, Oklahoma City, and Houston) (Note: November 24, 2020: Detroit Pistons to Houston Rockets: Houston acquired Christian Wood (sign and trade), a future first-round pick, and a future second-round pick from the Los Angeles Lakers; Detroit acquired Trevor Ariza, the draft rights to Isaiah Stewart, a future Houston second-round pick, and cash considerations; July 29, 2021: Houston Rockets to Oklahoma City Thunder: Houston acquired the draft rights to Alperen Şengün; Oklahoma City acquired two future first-round draft picks; June 23, 2022: Oklahoma City Thunder to New York Knicks: Oklahoma City acquired the draft rights to Ousmane Dieng; NY Knicks acquired 3 protected first-round picks; October 2, 2024: New York Knicks to Minnesota Timberwolves (three-team trade with Charlotte: New York acquired Karl-Anthony Towns and the draft rights to James Nnaji; Minnesota acquired Julius Randle, Donte DiVincenzo, Keita Bates-Diop, 2025 DET protected first-round pick; Charlotte acquired Charlie Brown, DaQuan Jeffries, Duane Washington Jr., 2026 GSW second-round pick, 2031 NYK second-round pick, a 2025 second-round pick from MIN, and cash considerations)	Cedevita Olimpija (Slovenia)
1	18	Walter Clayton Jr.	PG	United States	Washington Wizards (from Memphis, (Note: February 6, 2025: Memphis Grizzlies to Washington Wizards (three-team trade with Sacramento): Memphis acquired Marvin Bagley III, Johnny Davis, 2025 and 2028 second-round picks; Washington acquired Colby Jones, Alex Len, Marcus Smart, 2025 MEM protected first-round pick; Sacramento acquired Jake LaRavia) traded to Utah) (Note: June 25, 2025: Washington Wizards to Utah Jazz: Utah acquired draft rights to Walter Clayton Jr.; Washington acquired draft rights to Will Riley and draft rights to Jamir Watkins)	Florida (Sr.)
1	19	Nolan Traoré	PG	France	Brooklyn Nets (from Milwaukee via New York, Detroit, Portland, and New Orleans) (Note: November 24, 2020: Milwaukee Bucks to New Orleans Pelicans (four-team trade with Denver and Oklahoma City): Milwaukee acquired Jrue Holiday and rights to Sam Merrill; New Orleans acquired Steven Adams, Eric Bledsoe, 2024 right to swap first-round pick with MIL, 2025 MIL first-round pick, 2026 right to swap first-round pick with MIL, and 2027 MIL first-round pick; Denver acquired rights to R. J. Hampton; Oklahoma City acquired Zylan Cheatham (sign and trade), Josh Gray (sign and trade), George Hill, Darius Miller, Kenrich Williams (sign and trade), 2023 DEN protected first-round pick, 2023 WAS second-round pick, and 2024 CHA second-round pick; February 8, 2022: New Orleans Pelicans to Portland Trail Blazers: New Orleans acquired C. J. McCollum, Larry Nance Jr. and Tony Snell; Portland acquired Josh Hart, Nickeil Alexander-Walker, Tomáš Satoranský, Didi Louzada, a protected first-round draft pick, and two second-round picks; July 6, 2022: Portland Trail Blazers to Detroit Pistons: Portland acquired Jerami Grant and Draft rights to Ismaël Kamagate; Detroit acquired Draft rights to Gabriele Procida, 2025 MIL protected first-round pick, 2025 DET second-round pick, and 2026 second-round pick; July 6, 2022: Detroit Pistons to New York Knicks: Detroit acquired Kemba Walker and Draft rights to Jalen Duren; NY Knicks acquired 2025 MIL protected first-round pick) (Note: July 6, 2024: New York Knicks to Brooklyn Nets: New York acquired Keita Bates-Diop, Mikal Bridges, Draft rights to Juan Pablo Vaulet (2015 No. 39), and 2026 second-round pick; Brooklyn acquired Bojan Bogdanović, Mamadi Diakite, Shake Milton (sign-and-trade), 2025 MIL protected first-round pick, 2025 NYK first-round pick, 2025 BKN second-round pick, 2027 NYK first-round pick, 2028 NYK first-round pick swap, 2029 NYK first-round pick, and 2031 NYK first-round pick)	Saint-Quentin (France)
1	20	Kasparas Jakučionis	PG	Lithuania	Miami Heat (from Golden State) (Note: February 6, 2025: Golden State Warriors to Miami Heat (five-team trade with Detroit, Toronto, and Utah): Golden State acquired Jimmy Butler; Miami acquired Kyle Anderson, Davion Mitchell, Andrew Wiggins, and 2025 GSW protected first-round pick; Detroit acquired Dennis Schröder, Lindy Waters III, and 2031 second-round pick; Toronto acquired P. J. Tucker, 2026 LAL second-round pick, and cash considerations; Utah acquired KJ Martin, Josh Richardson, 2028 second-round pick, 2031 second-round pick, and cash considerations)	Illinois (Fr.)
1	21	Will Riley	SF	Canada	Utah Jazz (from Minnesota, (Note: July 6, 2022: Minnesota Timberwolves to Utah Jazz: Utah acquired Walker Kessler, 2023, 2025, 2027, and 2029 first-round picks, and 2026 right to swap first-round picks; Minnesota acquired Rudy Gobert) traded to Washington)	Illinois (Fr.)
1	22	Drake Powell	SG	United States	Atlanta Hawks (from LA Lakers via New Orleans, (Note: July 6, 2019: Los Angeles Lakers to New Orleans Pelicans (three-team trade with Washington): LA Lakers acquired Anthony Davis; New Orleans acquired Lonzo Ball, Josh Hart, Brandon Ingram, Draft rights to De'Andre Hunter, 2021 LAL protected first-round pick, 2025 LAL first-round pick, 2023 LAL first-round pick swap, and cash considerations; Washington acquired Isaac Bonga, Jemerrio Jones, Moritz Wager, and 2022 second-round pick; July 6, 2024: New Orleans Pelicans to Atlanta Hawks: New Orleans acquired Dejounte Murray; Atlanta acquired Dyson Daniels, E. J. Liddell, Larry Nance Jr., Cody Zeller (sign-and-trade), 2025 LAL first-round pick, and 2027 first-round pick) traded to Brooklyn) (Note: July 7, 2025: Atlanta Hawks to Brooklyn Nets (three-team trade with Boston): Atlanta acquired Kristaps Porziņģis and 2026 second-round pick; Brooklyn acquired Terance Mann and draft rights to Drake Powell; Boston acquired Georges Niang, 2031 CLE second-round pick, and cash considerations)	North Carolina (Fr.)
1	23	Asa Newell	PF	United States	New Orleans Pelicans (from Indiana, (Note: June 17, 2025: Indiana Pacers to New Orleans Pelicans: Indiana acquired 2026 IND first-round pick; New Orleans acquired 2025 IND first-round pick (No. 23) and Draft rights to Mojave King (2023 No. 47)) traded to Atlanta)	Georgia (Fr.)
1	24	Nique Clifford	SG	United States	Oklahoma City Thunder (from LA Clippers, traded to Sacramento) (Note: June 25, 2025: Oklahoma City Thunder to Sacramento Kings: Oklahoma City acquired 2027 SAS protected first-round pick; Sacramento acquired draft rights to Nique Clifford)	Colorado State (Sr.)
1	25	Jase Richardson	SG	United States	Orlando Magic (from Denver) (Note: March 25, 2021: Denver Nuggets to Orlando Magic: Denver acquired Gary Clark and Aaron Gordon; Orlando acquired R. J. Hampton, Gary Harris, and 2025 DEN first-round pick)	Michigan State (Fr.)
1	26	Ben Saraf	SG	Israel	Brooklyn Nets (from New York)	Ratiopharm Ulm (Germany)
1	27	Danny Wolf	PF	United States; Israel	Brooklyn Nets (from Houston)	Michigan (Jr.)
1	28	Hugo González	SF	Spain	Boston Celtics	Real Madrid (Spain)
1	29	Liam McNeeley	SF	United States	Phoenix Suns (from Cleveland via Utah, (Note: September 3, 2022: Cleveland Cavaliers to Utah Jazz: Utah acquired Ochai Agbaji, Lauri Markkanen, Collin Sexton (sign-and-trade), 2025 CLE first-round pick, 2026 right to swap first-round picks, 2027 CLE first-round pick, 2028 right to swap first-round picks, and 2029 CLE first-round pick; Cleveland acquired Donovan Mitchell; January 21, 2025: Utah Jazz to Phoenix Suns: Phoenix acquired 2025, 2027, and 2029 first-round picks; Utah acquired 2031 PHX first-round pick)) traded to Charlotte) (Note: June 30, 2025: Phoenix Suns to Charlotte Hornets: Phoenix acquired Mark Williams and 2029 PHX second-round pick; Charlotte acquired Vasilije Micić, draft rights to Liam McNeeley, 2029 first-round pick)	UConn (Fr.)
1	30	Yanic Konan Niederhäuser	C	Switzerland	Los Angeles Clippers (from Oklahoma City)	Penn State (Jr.)
2	31	Rasheer Fleming	PF	United States	Minnesota Timberwolves (from Utah, (Note: February 9, 2023: Utah Jazz to Minnesota Timberwolves (three-team trade with LA Lakers): Utah acquired Damian Jones, Juan Toscano-Anderson, Russell Westbrook, and 2027 LAL protected first-round pick; Minnesota acquired Nickeil Alexander-Walker, Mike Conley, 2024 second-round pick, 2025 and 2026 UTA second-round pick; LA Lakers acquired Malik Beasley, D'Angelo Russell, and Jarred Vanderbilt) traded to Phoenix)	Saint Joseph's (Jr.)
2	32	Noah Penda	SF	France	Boston Celtics (from Washington via Detroit and Brooklyn, (Note: August 6, 2021: Washington Wizards to Brooklyn Nets (five-team trade with Indiana, LA Lakers, and San Antonio): Washington acquired Kentavious Caldwell-Pope, Spencer Dinwiddie (sign-and-trade), Montrezl Harrell, Aaron Holiday, Kyle Kuzma, Draft rights to Isaiah Todd, and cash considerations; Brooklyn acquired 2024 second-round pick, 2025 second-round pick swap right, and Draft rights to Nikola Milutinov (2015 No. 26); Indiana acquired Draft rights to Isaiah Jackson; LA Lakers acquired Russell Westbrook, 2023 CHI second-round pick, 2024 second-round pick, and 2028 WAS second-round pick; San Antonio acquired Chandler Hutchison and 2022 second-round pick; September 4, 2021: Brooklyn Nets to Detroit Pistons: Brooklyn acquired Sekou Doumbouya and Jahlil Okafor; Detroit acquired DeAndre Jordan, 2022 BKN second-round pick, 2025 second-round pick, 2027 BKN second-round pick, and cash considerations; June 28, 2023: Detroit Pistons to Boston Celtics: Detroit acquired Draft rights to Marcus Sasser; Boston acquired Draft rights to James Nnaji, 2025 second-round pick, 2026 second-round pick) traded to Orlando) (Note: June 26, 2025: Boston Celtics to Orlando Magic: Boston acquired draft rights to Amari Williams, draft rights to Max Shulga, 2026 second-round pick, and 2027 second-round pick; Orlando acquired draft rights to Noah Penda)	Le Mans Sarthe (France)
2	33	Sion James	SG	United States	Charlotte Hornets	Duke (Sr.)
2	34	Ryan Kalkbrenner	C	United States	Charlotte Hornets (from New Orleans via San Antonio, Phoenix, and Memphis) (Note: August 7, 2021: New Orleans Pelicans to Memphis Grizzlies (three-team trade with Charlotte): New Orleans acquired Devonte' Graham (sign-and-trade), Jonas Valančiūnas, Draft rights to Trey Murphy III, and Draft rights to Brandon Boston Jr.; Memphis acquired Steven Adams, Eric Bledsoe, Draft rights to Ziaire Williams, Draft rights to Jared Butler, and 2025 NOP second-round pick; Charlotte acquired Wes Iwundu, Draft rights to Tyler Harvey (2015 No. 51), 2022 NOP protected first-round pick, and cash considerations; July 11, 2023: Memphis Grizzlies to Phoenix Suns: Memphis acquired Isaiah Todd, 2024 right to swap first-round picks, and 2030 right to swap first-round picks; Phoenix acquired 2025 NOP second-round pick, 2028 and 2029 MEM second-round pick; July 17, 2023: Phoenix Suns to San Antonio Spurs: Phoenix acquired 2024 SAS protected second-round pick; San Antonio acquired Cameron Payne, 2025 NOP second-round pick, and cash considerations; July 17, 2023: San Antonio Spurs to Charlotte Hornets: San Antonio acquired cash considerations; Charlotte acquired Devonte' Graham and 2025 NOP second-round pick)	Creighton (Sr.)
2	35	Johni Broome	PF	United States	Philadelphia 76ers	Auburn (Sr.)
2	36	Adou Thiero	SF	United States	Brooklyn Nets (traded to LA Lakers)	Arkansas (Jr.)
2	37	Chaz Lanier	SG	United States	Detroit Pistons (from Toronto via Dallas and San Antonio) (Note: February 9, 2023:Toronto Raptors to San Antonio Spurs: San Antonio acquired Khem Birch, 2023 TOR second-round pick, 2024 TOR protected first-round pick, 2025 TOR second-round pick; Toronto acquired Jakob Poeltl; July 12, 2023: San Antonio Spurs to Dallas Mavericks: Boston acquired 2024 second-round pick, 2025 right to swap second-round picks, 2030 DAL second-round pick; Dallas acquired Grant Williams (sign-and-trade), 2025 TOR second-round pick, 2028 MIA second-round pick; San Antonio acquired Reggie Bullock, 2030 right to swap first-round picks; July 6, 2024: Dallas Mavericks to Detroit Pistons: Dallas acquired Quentin Grimes; Detroit acquired Tim Hardaway Jr., 2025 TOR second-round pick, 2028 MIA second-round pick, 2028 second-round pick)	Tennessee (Sr.)
2	38	Kam Jones	SG	United States	San Antonio Spurs (traded to Indiana) (Note: July 6, 2025: San Antonio Spurs to Indiana Pacers: San Antonio acquired 2030 SAC second-round pick and cash considerations; Indiana acquired draft rights to Kam Jones)	Marquette (Sr.)
2	39	Alijah Martin	SG	United States	Toronto Raptors (from Portland via Sacramento) (Note: January 21, 2020: Portland Trail Blazers to Sacramento Kings: Sacramento acquired Kent Bazemore, Anthony Tolliver, 2024 and 2025 second-round selections; Portland acquired Trevor Ariza, Wenyen Gabriel, and Caleb Swanigan; June 28, 2024: Sacramento Kings to Toronto Raptors: Toronto acquired Davion Mitchell, Aleksandar Vezenkov, Draft rights to Jamal Shead (No. 45), and 2025 POR second-round pick; Sacramento acquired Jalen McDaniels)	Florida (Sr.)
2	40	Micah Peavy	SF	United States	Washington Wizards (from Phoenix, (Note: June 26, 2023: Phoenix Suns to Washington Wizards (three-team trade with Indiana): Washington acquired Chris Paul, Landry Shamet, the draft rights to Bilal Coulibaly, 2024, 2025, 2026, 2027 and 2030 second-round picks, rights to swap first-round picks in 2024, 2026, 2028 and 2030, and cash considerations; Phoenix acquired Bradley Beal, Jordan Goodwin, and Isaiah Todd; Indiana acquired the draft rights to Jarace Walker, 2028 PHX second-round pick, and 2029 WAS second-round pick) traded to New Orleans) (Note: July 6, 2025: Washington Wizards to New Orleans Pelicans (three-team trade with Houston): Washington acquired CJ McCollum, Kelly Olynyk, Cam Whitmore, and 2027 CHI second-round pick; New Orleans acquired Saddiq Bey, Jordan Poole, and draft rights to Micah Peavy; Houston acquired 2026 CHI second-round pick, 2029 SAC second-round pick, and draft rights to Mojave King (2023 No. 47))	Georgetown (Sr.)
2	41	Koby Brea	SG	Dominican Republic	Golden State Warriors (from Miami via Brooklyn and Indiana, (Note: July 6, 2019: Miami Heat to Indiana Pacers (three-team trade with Phoenix): Miami acquired Draft rights to KZ Okpala; Indiana acquired T. J. Warren, 2022, 2025 and 2026 MIA second-round pick; Phoenix acquired cash considerations; October 6, 2021: Indiana Pacers to Brooklyn Nets: Indiana acquired Draft rights to Juan Pablo Vaulet; Brooklyn acquired Edmond Sumner and 2025 MIA protected second-round pick; December 15, 2024: Brooklyn Nets to Golden State Warriors: Brooklyn acquired Reece Beekman, De'Anthony Melton, 2026 ATL second-round pick, 2028 ATL second-round pick, and 2029 GSW second-round pick; Golden State acquired Dennis Schröder and 2025 MIA protected second-round pick) traded to Phoenix)	Kentucky (Sr.)
2	42	Maxime Raynaud	C	France	Sacramento Kings (from Chicago via San Antonio) (Note: August 11, 2021: Chicago Bulls to San Antonio Spurs: Chicago acquired DeMar DeRozan (sign-and-trade); San Antonio acquired Al-Farouq Aminu, Thaddeus Young, 2022 second-round pick, 2025 CHI protected first-round pick, and 2025 CHI second-round pick; February 3, 2025: San Antonio Spurs to Sacramento Kings (three-team trade with Chicago): Sacramento acquired Sidy Cissoko, Zach LaVine, 2025 CHA protected first-round pick, 2025 CHI second-round pick, 2027 SAS first-round pick, 2028 DEN protected second-round pick, 2028 SAC second-round pick, and 2031 MIN first-round pick; Chicago acquired Zach Collins, Kevin Huerter, and Tre Jones; San Antonio acquired De'Aaron Fox and Jordan McLaughlin)	Stanford (Sr.)
2	43	Jamir Watkins	SG	United States	Utah Jazz (from Dallas, (Note: February 2, 2025: Dallas Mavericks to Utah Jazz (three-team trade with LA Lakers): Utah acquired Jalen Hood-Schifino, 2025 DAL second-round pick, and 2025 LAC second-round pick; Dallas acquired Max Christie, Anthony Davis, 2029 LAL first-round pick, and cash considerations; LA Lakers acquired Luka Dončić, Maxi Kleber, Markieff Morris, and cash considerations) traded to Washington)	Florida State (Sr.)
2	44	Brooks Barnhizer	SF	United States	Oklahoma City Thunder (from Atlanta) (Note: November 24, 2020: Atlanta Hawks to Oklahoma City Thunder: Atlanta acquired Danilo Gallinari (sign and trade) and cash considerations; Oklahoma City acquired 2025 ATL protected second-round pick)	Northwestern (Sr.)
2	45	Rocco Zikarsky	C	Australia	Chicago Bulls (from Sacramento, (Note: July 8, 2024: Sacramento Kings to Chicago Bulls (three-team trade with San Antonio): Sacramento acquired DeMar DeRozan (sign-and-trade); Chicago acquired Chris Duarte, RaiQuan Gray, 2025 SAC second-round pick, 2028 SAC second-round pick, and cash considerations; San Antonio acquired Harrison Barnes and 2031 first-round pick swap right)) traded to Minnesota via LA Lakers) (Note: July 1, 2025: Chicago Bulls to Los Angeles Lakers: Chicago acquired draft rights to Lachlan Olbrich and cash considerations; LA Lakers acquired draft rights to Rocco Zikarsky)	Brisbane Bullets (Australia)
2	46	Amari Williams	C	United Kingdom	Orlando Magic (traded to Boston)	Kentucky (Sr.)
2	47	Bogoljub Marković	PF	Serbia	Milwaukee Bucks (from Detroit via Washington) (Note: January 14, 2024: Detroit Pistons to Washington Wizards: Detroit acquired Danilo Gallinari and Mike Muscala; Washington acquired Marvin Bagley III, Isaiah Livers, 2025 second-round pick, and 2026 second-round pick; February 6, 2025: Washington Wizards to Milwaukee Bucks (four-team trade with New York and San Antonio): Washington acquired AJ Johnson, Khris Middleton, Draft rights to Mathias Lessort (2017 No. 50), 2028 right to swap first-round picks, and cash considerations; Milwaukee acquired Kyle Kuzma, Jericho Sims, 2025 second-round pick, and 2026 SAS protected second-round pick; New York acquired Delon Wright, Draft rights to Hugo Besson (2022 No. 58), and cash considerations; San Antonio acquired Patrick Baldwin Jr. and cash considerations)	Mega Basket (Serbia)
2	48	Javon Small	PG	United States	Memphis Grizzlies (from Golden State via Washington and Brooklyn) (Note: July 7, 2019: Golden State Warriors to Brooklyn Nets: Golden State acquired D'Angelo Russell (sign and trade), Shabazz Napier, and Treveon Graham; Brooklyn acquired Kevin Durant (sign and trade) and a 2025 GSW second-round pick; August 6, 2021: Washington Wizards to Brooklyn Nets (five-team trade with Indiana, LA Lakers, and San Antonio): Washington acquired Kentavious Caldwell-Pope, Spencer Dinwiddie (sign-and-trade), Montrezl Harrell, Aaron Holiday, Kyle Kuzma, Draft rights to Isaiah Todd, and cash considerations; Brooklyn acquired 2024 second-round pick, 2025 second-round pick swap right, and Draft rights to Nikola Milutinov (2015 No. 26); Indiana acquired Draft rights to Isaiah Jackson; LA Lakers acquired Russell Westbrook, 2023 CHI second-round pick, 2024 second-round pick, and 2028 WAS second-round pick; San Antonio acquired Chandler Hutchison and 2022 second-round pick; September 4, 2021: Brooklyn Nets to Detroit Pistons: Brooklyn acquired Sekou Doumbouya and Jahlil Okafor; Detroit acquired DeAndre Jordan, 2022 BKN second-round pick, 2025 second-round pick, 2027 BKN second-round pick, and cash considerations)	West Virginia (Sr.)
2	49	Tyrese Proctor	PG	Australia	Cleveland Cavaliers (from Milwaukee) (Note: November 18, 2020: Milwaukee Bucks to Cleveland Cavaliers: Milwaukee acquired the rights to İlkan Karaman (2012 No. 57); Cleveland acquired removal of protection on 2022 MIL first-round pick and a 2025 MIL second-round pick)	Duke (Jr.)
2	50	Kobe Sanders	SG/SF	United States	New York Knicks (from Memphis via Oklahoma City and Boston, (Note: November 20, 2020: Memphis Grizzlies to Boston Celtics (three-team trade with Portland): Memphis acquired Mario Hezonja and rights to Desmond Bane; Boston acquired 2023 second-round pick and 2025 MEM second-round pick; Portland acquired Enes Kanter and cash considerations; June 18, 2021: Boston Celtics to Oklahoma City Thunder: Boston acquired Moses Brown, Al Horford, and 2023 second-round pick; Oklahoma City acquired Kemba Walker, 2021 BOS first-round pick, and 2025 second-round pick; June 26, 2024: Oklahoma City Thunder to New York Knicks: Oklahoma City acquired Draft rights to Dillon Jones; New York acquired 2025 second-round pick, 2026 GSW second-round pick, 2027 MIN second-round pick, 2027 second-round pick, and 2027 second-round pick) traded to LA Clippers) (Note: June 26, 2025: New York Knicks to Los Angeles Clippers: New York acquired draft rights to Mohamed Diawara and draft rights to Luka Mitrović (2015 No. 60); LA Clippers acquired draft rights to Kobe Sanders)	Nevada (Sr.)
2	51	Mohamed Diawara	PF	France	Los Angeles Clippers (from Minnesota via Atlanta and Houston, (Note: June 24, 2022: Minnesota Timberwolves to Houston Rockets: Minnesota acquired the rights to Wendell Moore Jr.; Houston acquired the rights to TyTy Washington Jr., 2025 and 2027 MIN second-round pick; July 8, 2023: Houston Rockets to Atlanta Hawks (five-team trade with LA Clippers, Memphis, and Oklahoma City): Houston acquired Dillon Brooks, Draft rights to Alpha Kaba (2017 No. 60), 2026 LAC second-round pick, and 2027 MEM second-round pick; Atlanta acquired Usman Garuba, TyTy Washington Jr., 2025 MIN second-round pick, 2028 HOU second-round pick, and cash considerations; LA Clippers acquired Kenyon Martin Jr.; Memphis acquired Josh Christopher and Draft rights to Vanja Marinković (2019 No. 60); Oklahoma City acquired Patty Mills, 2024, 2029 and 2030 HOU second-round pick; February 6, 2025: Atlanta Hawks to Los Angeles Clippers: Atlanta acquired the rights to Bones Hyland and Terance Mann; LA Clippers acquired Bogdan Bogdanović, 2025 MIN second-round pick, 2026 MEM protected second-round pick, and 2027 LAC second-round pick) traded to New York)	Cholet Basket (France)
2	52	Alex Toohey^{#}	SF	Australia	Phoenix Suns (from Denver via Charlotte and Minnesota, (Note: July 6, 2024: Denver Nuggets to Minnesota Timberwolves (six-team trade with Charlotte, Dallas, Golden State, and Philadelphia): Denver acquired 2025 PHI second-round pick and cash considerations; Minnesota acquired 2025 second-round pick, 2031 second-round pick swap right, and cash considerations; Charlotte acquired Josh Green, Reggie Jackson, 2029 and 2030 DEN second-round pick; Dallas acquired Klay Thompson (sign-and-trade) and 2025 second-round pick; Golden State acquired Kyle Anderson (sign-and-trade) and Buddy Hield (sign-and-trade); Philadelphia acquired 2031 DAL second-round pick; October 2, 2024: Minnesota Timberwolves to Charlotte Hornets (three-team trade with New York): Minnesota acquired Julius Randle, Donte DiVincenzo, Keita Bates-Diop, 2025 DET protected first-round pick; Charlotte acquired Charlie Brown, DaQuan Jeffries, Duane Washington Jr., 2026 GSW second-round pick, 2031 NYK second-round pick, a 2025 second-round pick from MIN, and cash considerations; New York acquired Karl-Anthony Towns and the draft rights to James Nnaji; January 15, 2025: Charlotte Hornets to Phoenix Suns: Charlotte acquired Josh Okogie, 2026 DEN second-round pick, 2031 DEN second-round pick, and 2031 PHO second-round pick; Phoenix acquired Nick Richards and 2025 second-round pick) traded to Golden State)	Sydney Kings (Australia)
2	53	John Tonje	SG	United States	Utah Jazz (from LA Clippers via the LA Lakers) (Note: February 9, 2023: Los Angeles Clippers to Los Angeles Lakers (four-team trade with Denver and Orlando): LA Clippers acquired Bones Hyland; LA Lakers acquired Mo Bamba, Davon Reed, 2024 and 2025 LAC second-round pick; Denver acquired Thomas Bryant; Orlando acquired Patrick Beverley, 2024 DEN second-round pick, and cash considerations)	Wisconsin (Sr.)
2	54	Taelon Peter	PG	United States	Indiana Pacers	Liberty (Sr.)
2	55	Lachlan Olbrich	PF	Australia	Los Angeles Lakers (traded to Chicago)	Illawarra Hawks (Australia)
2	New York Knicks (forfeited due to tampering violation)					
2	56	Will Richard	PG	United States	Memphis Grizzlies (from Houston, (Note: February 1, 2024: Houston Rockets to Memphis Grizzlies: Memphis acquired Victor Oladipo, 2024 OKC second-round pick, 2024 protected second-round pick, and 2025 second-round pick; Houston acquired Steven Adams) traded to Golden State) (Note: July 6, 2025: Memphis Grizzlies to Golden State Warriors: Memphis acquired draft rights to Justinian Jessup (2020 No. 51), draft rights to Jahmai Mashack, and 2032 GSW protected second-round pick; Golden State acquired draft rights to Will Richard)	Florida (Sr.)
2	57	Max Shulga	SG	Ukraine	Orlando Magic (from Boston, (Note: March 25, 2021: Boston Celtics to Orlando Magic: Orlando acquired Jeff Teague, 2025 second-round pick, and 2027 BOS second-round pick; Boston acquired Evan Fournier) traded to Boston)	VCU (Sr.)
2	58	Saliou Niang^{#}	SG	Italy	Cleveland Cavaliers	Aquila Basket Trento (Italy)
2	59	Jahmai Mashack	SG	United States	Houston Rockets (from Oklahoma City via Atlanta, (Note: July 25, 2018: Oklahoma City Thunder to Atlanta Hawks (three-team trade with Philadelphia): Atlanta acquired Carmelo Anthony, Justin Anderson, and a protected 2022 first-round pick (protected top 14 in 2022, else 2024 and 2025 second-round picks); Oklahoma City acquired Dennis Schröder and Timothé Luwawu-Cabarrot; Philadelphia acquired Mike Muscala; February 9, 2023: Atlanta Hawks to Houston Rockets: Houston acquired Justin Holiday, Frank Kaminsky, 2024 and 2025 OKC second-round pick; Atlanta acquired Bruno Fernando and Garrison Mathews) traded to Memphis via Golden State)	Tennessee (Sr.)

== Notable undrafted players ==
These players were not selected in the 2025 NBA draft, but have played at least one regular-season or playoff game in the NBA.

Player	Pos.	Nationality	School/club team
Jaden Akins	PG	United States	Michigan State (Sr.)
Adama Bal	G/F	France	Santa Clara (Sr.)
Dylan Cardwell	C	United States	Auburn (Sr.)
Moussa Cissé	C	Guinea	Memphis (Sr.)
LJ Cryer	PG	United States	Houston (Sr.)
Hunter Dickinson	C	United States	Kansas (Sr.)
Andersson Garcia	SF	Dominican Republic	Texas A&M (Sr.)
Keshon Gilbert	PG	United States	Iowa State (Sr.)
Vladislav Goldin	C	Russia	Michigan (Sr.)
Hayden Gray	PG/SG	United States	UC San Diego (Sr.)
Chucky Hepburn	PG	United States	Louisville (Sr.)
C. J. Huntley	PF	United States	Appalachian State (Sr.)
Chaney Johnson	SF	United States	Auburn (Sr.)
Curtis Jones	SG	United States	Iowa State (Sr.)
Miles Kelly	SG	United States	Auburn (Sr.)
Jayson Kent	SF	United States	Texas (Sr.)
Caleb Love	PG	United States	Arizona (Sr.)
Lawson Lovering	C	United States	Utah (Sr.)
Chris Mañon	SG	United States	Vanderbilt (Sr.)
Bez Mbeng	SG	United States	Yale (Sr.)
Grant Nelson	PF	United States	Alabama (Sr.)
Ryan Nembhard	PG	Canada	Gonzaga (Sr.)
Toby Okani	SG	United States	West Virginia (Sr.)
Norchad Omier	PF	Nicaragua	Baylor (Sr.)
Sean Pedulla	PG	United States	Ole Miss (Sr.)
John Poulakidas	SG	United States	Yale (Sr.)
Julian Reese	PF	United States	Maryland (Sr.)
Kadary Richmond	PG/SG	United States	St. John's (Sr.)
Hunter Sallis	SG	United States	Wake Forest (Sr.)
Payton Sandfort	SF	United States	Iowa (Sr.)
Mark Sears	PG	United States	Alabama (Sr.)
Jahmyl Telfort	SF	Canada	Butler (Sr.)
Chris Youngblood	SG	United States	Alabama (Sr.)

== Trades involving draft picks ==
=== Pre-draft trades ===
Prior to the draft, the following trades were made and resulted in exchanges of draft picks between teams:

=== Post-draft trades ===
Post-draft trades are made after the draft begins. These trades are usually not confirmed until the next day or after free agency officially begins.

== Combine ==
The 11th G League Elite Camp took place on May 9–11, from which certain participants were selected to join the main draft combine.

The primary portion of the 2025 NBA draft combine was held from May 11–18 in Chicago, Illinois.

== Draft lottery ==
External videos
- 2025 NBA Draft Lottery Drawing, NBA's official YouTube channel. May 12, 2025.

The NBA draft lottery was held on May 12.

Denotes the actual lottery result

Team	2024–25 record	Lottery chances	Lottery probabilities													
Team	2024–25 record	Lottery chances	1st	2nd	3rd	4th	5th	6th	7th	8th	9th	10th	11th	12th	13th	14th
Utah Jazz	17–65	140	14.0%	13.4%	12.7%	12.0%	47.9%	–	–	–	–	–	–	–	–	–
Washington Wizards	18–64	140	14.0%	13.4%	12.7%	12.0%	27.8%	20.0%	–	–	–	–	–	–	–	–
Charlotte Hornets	19–63	140	14.0%	13.4%	12.7%	12.0%	14.8%	26.0%	7.0%	–	–	–	–	–	–	–
New Orleans Pelicans	21–61	125	12.5%	12.2%	11.9%	11.5%	7.2%	25.7%	16.8%	2.2%	–	–	–	–	–	–
Philadelphia 76ers (Note: Philadelphia kept their pick since it was inside the top 6. Oklahoma City would have received the pick had it gone outside of the top 6.)	24–58	105	10.5%	10.5%	10.6%	10.5%	2.2%	19.6%	26.7%	8.7%	0.6%	–	–	–	–	–
Brooklyn Nets	26–56	90	9.0%	9.2%	9.4%	9.6%	–	8.6%	29.7%	20.6%	3.7%	0.2%	–	–	–	–
Toronto Raptors	30–52	75	7.5%	7.8%	8.1%	8.5%	–	–	19.7%	34.1%	12.9%	1.3%	<0.1%	–	–	–
San Antonio Spurs	34–48	60	6.0%	6.3%	6.7%	7.2%	–	–	–	34.5%	32.0%	6.8%	0.4%	<0.1%	–	–
Phoenix Suns (to Houston)	36–46	38	3.8%	4.1%	4.5%	4.9%	–	–	–	–	50.7%	28.3%	3.5%	0.1%	<0.1%	–
Portland Trail Blazers	36–46	37	3.7%	4.0%	4.4%	4.8%	–	–	–	–	–	63.4%	18.5%	1.2%	<0.1%	<0.1%
Dallas Mavericks	39–43	18	1.8%	2.0%	2.2%	2.5%	–	–	–	–	–	–	77.6%	13.5%	0.5%	<0.1%
Chicago Bulls	39–43	17	1.7%	1.9%	2.1%	2.4%	–	–	–	–	–	–	–	85.2%	6.6%	0.1%
Sacramento Kings (to Atlanta) (Note: Atlanta received the pick since it was outside the top 12. Sacramento would have retained the pick had it moved up into the top 12.)	40–42	8	0.8%	0.9%	1.0%	1.1%	–	–	–	–	–	–	–	–	92.9%	3.3%
Atlanta Hawks (to San Antonio)	40–42	7	0.7%	0.8%	0.9%	1.0%	–	–	–	–	–	–	–	–	–	96.6%

== Eligibility and entrants ==
The draft is conducted under the eligibility rules established in the league's 2023 collective bargaining agreement (CBA) with its players' union.

- All drafted players must be at least 19 years old during the calendar year of the draft. In terms of dates, players who were eligible for the 2025 NBA draft must have been born on or before December 31, 2006.
- Since the 2016 draft, the following rules are, as implemented by the NCAA Division I council for that division:
  - Declaration for the draft no longer results in automatic loss of college eligibility. As long as a player does not sign a contract with a professional team outside the NBA or sign with an agent, he retains college eligibility as long as he makes a timely withdrawal from the draft.
  - NCAA players now have 10 days after the end of the NBA draft combine to withdraw from the draft. Since the combine is normally held in mid-May, the current deadline is about five weeks after the previous mid-April deadline.
  - NCAA players may participate in the draft combine and are allowed to attend one tryout per year with each NBA team without losing college eligibility.
  - NCAA players may now enter and withdraw from the draft up to two times without loss of eligibility. Previously, the NCAA treated a second declaration of draft eligibility as a permanent loss of college eligibility.

=== Early entrants ===
Players who were not automatically eligible had to declare their eligibility for the draft by notifying the NBA offices in writing no later than at least 60 days before the event. For the 2025 draft, the date fell on April 26. Under the CBA a player may withdraw his name from consideration from the draft at any time before the final declaration deadline, which usually falls 10 days before the draft at 5:00 p.m. EDT (2100 UTC). Under current NCAA rules, players usually have until 10 days after the draft combine to withdraw from the draft and retain college eligibility.

A player who has hired an agent for purposes of negotiating with professional teams (Note: Due to changes in rules regarding student athlete compensation in the 2020s, players can hire agents to manage appearances and endorsements while retaining college athletic eligibility.) retains his remaining college eligibility regardless of whether he is drafted after an evaluation from the NBA Undergraduate Advisory Committee. Players who declare for the NBA draft and are not selected have the opportunity to return to their school for at least another year only after terminating all agreements with their agents, (Note: Specifically agents hired to negotiate with professional teams. Relationships with agents hired for other purposes are not affected.) who must have been certified.

On April 29, 2025, the NBA announced the 106 players who filed as early entry candidates. On May 30, 50 early entry candidates withdrew their eligibility. By the end of the international deadline, 13 more early entry players withdrew their names from the draft listing as well, leaving only a total of 46 early entrants (32 being players that were born in the U.S. and 14 being born overseas) available for this year's draft. This marked the lowest total of early entrant players in well over a decade.

==== College underclassmen ====
- (United States) Ace Bailey – F, Rutgers (freshman)
- (United States) Carter Bryant – F, Arizona (freshman)
- (Russia) Egor Dëmin – G, BYU (freshman)
- (The Bahamas) V. J. Edgecombe – G, Baylor (freshman)
- (United States) Jeremiah Fears – G, Oklahoma (freshman)
- (United States) Cooper Flagg – F, Duke (freshman)
- (United States) Rasheer Fleming – F, Saint Joseph's (junior)
- (United States) Dylan Harper – G, Rutgers (freshman)
- (Lithuania) Kasparas Jakučionis – G, Illinois (freshman)
- (United States) Tre Johnson – G, Texas (freshman)
- (United States) Kon Knueppel – G, Duke (freshman)
- (United States) RJ Luis Jr. – G, St. John's (junior)
- (South Sudan) Khaman Maluach – C, Duke (freshman)
- (United States) Liam McNeeley – F, UConn (freshman)
- (United States) Collin Murray-Boyles – F, South Carolina (sophomore)
- (United States) Asa Newell – F, Georgia (freshman)
- (Switzerland) Yanic Konan Niederhäuser – C, Penn State (junior)
- (United States) Drake Powell – G, North Carolina (freshman)
- (Australia) Tyrese Proctor – G, Duke (junior)
- (United States) Derik Queen – C, Maryland (freshman)
- (United States) Jase Richardson – G, Michigan State (freshman)
- (Canada) Will Riley – F, Illinois (freshman)
- (United States) Thomas Sorber – C, Georgetown (freshman)
- (United States) Adou Thiero – F, Arkansas (junior)
- (Israel) Danny Wolf – C, Michigan (junior)

==== College seniors ====
"Redshirt" referred to players who were redshirt seniors in the 2024–25 season and who have college eligibility remaining.

- (United States) Cedric Coward – G, Washington State
- (United States) Omar Rowe – G, Morehouse
- (United States) Jamir Watkins - G, Florida State

==== International players ====
- (Spain) Izan Almansa – F, Perth Wildcats (Australia)
- (France) Joan Beringer – C, Cedevita Olimpija (Slovenia)
- Mohamed Diawara – F, Cholet Basket (France)
- (France) Noa Essengue – F, Ratiopharm Ulm (Germany)
- Hugo González – G, Real Madrid (Spain)
- Bogoljub Marković – F, Mega Basket (Serbia)
- (Senegal) Ousmane N'Diaye – C, Coviran Granada (Spain)
- Eli Ndiaye – F, Real Madrid (Spain)
- Saliou Niang – G, Aquila Basket Trento (Italy)
- Noah Penda – F, Le Mans Sarthe (France)
- (Israel) Ben Saraf – G, Ratiopharm Ulm (Germany)
- Alex Toohey – F, Sydney Kings (Australia)
- Nolan Traoré – G, Saint-Quentin (France)
- Yang Hansen – C, Qingdao Eagles (China)
- Rocco Zikarsky – C, Brisbane Bullets (Australia)

==== Other ====
- (United States) Muodubem Muoneke – G, Green Bay / Real Betis (Spain)
- (Spain) Isaac Nogués – G, Rip City Remix (NBA G League)
- (United States) Dink Pate – G, Mexico City Capitanes (NBA G League)

=== Automatically eligible entrants ===
Players who do not meet the criteria for "international" players are automatically eligible if they meet any of the following criteria:

- They have no remaining college eligibility.
- If they graduated from high school in the U.S., but did not enroll in a U.S. college or university, four years have passed since their high school class graduated.
- They have signed a contract with a professional basketball team not in the NBA, anywhere in the world, and have played under the contract.

Players who meet the criteria for "international" players are automatically eligible if they meet any of the following criteria:

- They are at least 22 years old during the calendar year of the draft. In term of dates players born on or before December 31, 2003, are automatically eligible for the 2025 draft.
- They have signed a contract with a professional basketball team not in the NBA within the United States, and have played under that contract.

== Invited attendees ==
The NBA annually invites players to sit in the so-called "green room", a special room set aside at the draft site for the invited players plus their families and agents. Ever since the NBA transitioned itself to a two-day draft as of the previous year's draft, the NBA sends out its invites in waves. The first wave was reported on June 10, with thirteen players confirmed to have received invitations.

- (United States) Ace Bailey – F, Rutgers
- (United States) Carter Bryant – F, Arizona
- (Russia) Egor Dëmin – G, Brigham Young
- (The Bahamas) V. J. Edgecombe – G, Baylor
- (United States) Jeremiah Fears – G, Oklahoma
- (United States) Cooper Flagg – F, Duke
- (United States) Dylan Harper – G, Rutgers
- (Lithuania) Kasparas Jakučionis – G, Illinois
- (United States) Tre Johnson – G, Texas
- (United States) Kon Knueppel – G, Duke
- (South Sudan) Khaman Maluach – C, Duke
- (United States) Asa Newell – F, Georgia
- (United States) Derik Queen – C, Maryland

A second group of invitees was announced on June 16.

- (France) Noa Essengue – F, Ratiopharm Ulm (Germany)
- (United States) Liam McNeeley – F, UConn
- (United States) Collin Murray-Boyles – F, South Carolina
- (Canada) Will Riley – F, Illinois
- (United States) Thomas Sorber – C, Georgetown
- Nolan Traoré – G, Saint-Quentin Basket-Ball (France)

A third group of invitees was announced three days later, raising the overall total to 24 invites.

- (France) Joan Beringer – C, Cedevita Olimpija (Slovenia)
- (United States) Walter Clayton Jr. – G, Florida
- (United States) Nique Clifford – G, Colorado State
- (United States) Cedric Coward – G, Washington State
- (United States) Danny Wolf – C, Michigan

An additional fourth group of invitees was announced for the second round of the draft on June 26 after every invitee in the prior waves got drafted in the first round, upping the final total of invites to 36. This marked the first time the NBA sent out invites mid-draft. Technically speaking, this also marked the first time a green room invitee went undrafted, with Izan Almansa being invited in this final wave.

- (Spain) Izan Almansa – F/C, Perth Wildcats (Australia)
- (United States) Koby Brea – G/F, Kentucky
- (United States) Johni Broome – C, Auburn
- (United States) Rasheer Fleming – F, Saint Joseph’s
- (United States) Kam Jones – G, Marquette
- Bogoljub Marković – F/C, Mega Basket (Serbia)
- (United States) Alijah Martin – G, Florida
- Saliou Niang – G/F, Virtus Bologna (Italy)
- (United States) Micah Peavy – G/F, Georgetown
- Noah Penda – F, Le Mans Sarthe Basket (France)
- (United States) Javon Small – G, West Virginia
- (United States) Adou Thiero – F, Arkansas
