= 2025–26 Los Angeles Clippers season =

- Head coach: Tyronn Lue
- President: Lawrence Frank; Gillian Zucker
- General manager: Trent Redden
- Owner: Steve Ballmer
- Arena: Intuit Dome

Results
- Record: 42–40 (.512)
- Place: Division: 3rd (Pacific); Conference: 9th (Western)
- Playoff finish: Did not qualify
- Stats at Basketball Reference

Local media
- Television: FanDuel Sports Network West; FanDuel Sports Network SoCal; Nexstar Media Group (Note: Affiliates include: KTLA (Los Angeles); KSWB-TV (San Diego); KGET-TV (Bakersfield); KSEE-TV/KGPE-TV (Fresno)) (9 simulcasts)
- Radio: KLAC

The 2025–26 Los Angeles Clippers season was the 56th season of the franchise in the National Basketball Association (NBA), their 48th season in Southern California, and their second season in Inglewood. The team had also hosted the 2026 NBA All-Star Game.

During the offseason, the Clippers made major changes to their roster, acquiring several All-Star veterans such as Brook Lopez, Bradley Beal, and reuniting with Chris Paul in his 21st and final season in the league, while retaining others such as James Harden, Kawhi Leonard and Nicolas Batum. These additions resulted in the Clippers roster having an average age of 33.2 years, the oldest team in NBA history. Guard and forward Norman Powell, who was on the verge of becoming an All-Star last season, was traded to the Miami Heat for Jazz forward John Collins to address the team's front court issues. The promising offseason turned sour, when in September 2025, investigative journalist Pablo Torre reported of a potential salary cap circumvention surrounding Clippers owner Steve Ballmer and the now-bankrupt environmental company Aspiration paying Leonard unethically, which prompted a league investigation that would last throughout the season.

Despite expectations of being a "dark horse" playoff contender in the Western Conference, the Clippers quickly floundered during the season as front office mismanagement, injuries, and poor play from several key players crippled their competency. Starting with a loss to the Utah Jazz on Opening Night, the Clippers went 5–16 in their first 21 games, the second-worst in their conference behind the New Orleans Pelicans, coinciding with a 2–13 record in November which was regarded as the worst month in their franchise history. Beal underperformed during the six of 10 games he appeared in before suffering a fractured hip on November 8 that was deemed season-ending. Starter Derrick Jones Jr. was ruled out for at least six weeks after a sprained MCL on November 17. Bogdan Bogdanović continued to miss significant time due to a left hip contusion, while Lopez and Paul fell almost completely out of the rotation. Collins was pushed to the starting lineup in response to the injuries, but their pair of losses to the Heat only furthered critic's concerns of his fit with the Clippers as opposed to Powell who was having a career year in Miami. On December 3, Paul was sent home during a road trip, a move which was controversial and criticized. After starting 6–21, the Clippers suddenly exploded and won 16 out of 19 games, obtaining a record of 22–24. By March 11, the Clippers became the first team in NBA history to get above .500 after starting 15 games below .500. On March 31, the Clippers clinched a play-in spot. This was their 15th consecutive winning season, and their 14th season in the NBA postseason in that time frame.

The team finished the regular season with a 42–40 record, placing ninth in the West as they also lost the tiebreaker to the Portland Trail Blazers due to intra-conference record. Their season came to an end in the first stage of the play-in tournament on April 15 against the Golden State Warriors, missing the playoffs for the first time since 2022.

== Draft picks ==
Round	Pick	Player	Position	Nationality	College
1	30	Yanic Konan Niederhäuser	C	Switzerland	Penn State

The Clippers entered the draft with a single first-round selection from a first-round swap with the Oklahoma City Thunder. The team's original second-round pick had previously been traded to the Los Angeles Lakers, who later dealt it to the Utah Jazz as part of the Luka Dončić–Anthony Davis trade.

== Roster ==
2025–26 Los Angeles Clippers roster
Players

Pos.	No.	Player	Height	Weight	DOB	From
G/F	33	Nicolas Batum	6 ft 7 in (2.01 m)	230 lb (104 kg)	1988-12-14	France
G	0	Bradley Beal (injured)	6 ft 4 in (1.93 m)	207 lb (94 kg)	1993-06-28	Florida
G	7	Bogdan Bogdanović	6 ft 5 in (1.96 m)	225 lb (102 kg)	1992-08-18	Serbia
G	12	Cam Christie	6 ft 5 in (1.96 m)	190 lb (86 kg)	2005-07-24	Minnesota
F/C	20	John Collins	6 ft 9 in (2.06 m)	226 lb (103 kg)	1997-09-23	Wake Forest
G	8	Kris Dunn	6 ft 3 in (1.91 m)	205 lb (93 kg)	1994-03-18	Providence
G	10	Darius Garland	6 ft 1 in (1.85 m)	192 lb (87 kg)	2000-01-26	Vanderbilt
F	23	Isaiah Jackson	6 ft 8 in (2.03 m)	205 lb (93 kg)	2002-01-10	Kentucky
F	5	Derrick Jones Jr.	6 ft 6 in (1.98 m)	210 lb (95 kg)	1997-02-15	UNLV
F	2	Kawhi Leonard	6 ft 6 in (1.98 m)	225 lb (102 kg)	1991-06-29	San Diego State
C	11	Brook Lopez	7 ft 1 in (2.16 m)	282 lb (128 kg)	1988-04-01	Stanford
G	9	Bennedict Mathurin	6 ft 5 in (1.96 m)	210 lb (95 kg)	2002-06-19	Arizona
G	22	Jordan Miller	6 ft 5 in (1.96 m)	194 lb (88 kg)	2000-01-23	Miami (FL)
C	14	Yanic Konan Niederhäuser (injured)	6 ft 11 in (2.11 m)	242 lb (110 kg)	2003-03-14	Penn State
F	55	Norchad Omier (TW)	6 ft 7 in (2.01 m)	248 lb (112 kg)	2002-10-10	Baylor
G	00	Sean Pedulla (TW)	6 ft 1 in (1.85 m)	195 lb (88 kg)	2002-10-10	Mississippi
G	4	Kobe Sanders	6 ft 8 in (2.03 m)	207 lb (94 kg)	2002-05-30	Nevada
G	15	TyTy Washington Jr. (TW)	6 ft 3 in (1.91 m)	195 lb (88 kg)	2001-11-15	Kentucky

Coaches
Head coach
- Tyronn Lue
Assistant(s)
- Jeremy Castleberry
- Larry Drew
- Shaun Fein
- Dahntay Jones
- Jay Larranaga
- Brian Shaw
- Jeff Van Gundy

Legend
- (DP) Unsigned draft pick
- (FA) Free agent
- (S) Suspended
- (GL) On assignment to G League affiliate
- (TW) Two-way affiliate player
- Injured

Roster
Updated: November 17, 2025

=== Roster Notes ===
- Center Brook Lopez is the 32nd former Lakers player to play for the Clippers.
- Guard Chris Paul makes his second tour of duty with the Clippers having played for them from 2011 to 2017. After 16 games, he was sent home on December 3, 2025, after conflicts with coaches and teammates. He was later sent to the Toronto Raptors at the trade deadline.

== Standings ==
=== Division ===
Pacific Division	W	L	PCT	GB	Home	Road	Div	GP
y – Los Angeles Lakers	53	29	.646	–	28‍–‍13	25‍–‍16	9‍–‍7	82
x – Phoenix Suns	45	37	.549	8.0	25‍–‍16	20‍–‍21	10‍–‍6	82
pi – Los Angeles Clippers	42	40	.512	11.0	23‍–‍18	19‍–‍22	10‍–‍6	82
pi – Golden State Warriors	37	45	.451	16.0	22‍–‍19	15‍–‍26	7‍–‍9	82
Sacramento Kings	22	60	.268	31.0	15‍–‍26	7‍–‍34	4‍–‍12	82

=== Conference ===
Western Conference
#	Team	W	L	PCT	GB	GP
1	z – Oklahoma City Thunder *	64	18	.780	–	82
2	y – San Antonio Spurs *	62	20	.756	2.0	82
3	x – Denver Nuggets	54	28	.659	10.0	82
4	y – Los Angeles Lakers *	53	29	.646	11.0	82
5	x – Houston Rockets	52	30	.634	12.0	82
6	x – Minnesota Timberwolves	49	33	.598	15.0	82
7	x – Phoenix Suns	45	37	.549	19.0	82
8	x – Portland Trail Blazers	42	40	.512	22.0	82
9	pi – Los Angeles Clippers	42	40	.512	22.0	82
10	pi – Golden State Warriors	37	45	.451	27.0	82
11	New Orleans Pelicans	26	56	.317	38.0	82
12	Dallas Mavericks	26	56	.317	38.0	82
13	Memphis Grizzlies	25	57	.305	39.0	82
14	Sacramento Kings	22	60	.268	42.0	82
15	Utah Jazz	22	60	.268	42.0	82

== Game log ==
=== Preseason ===
2025 preseason game log
Total: 3–1 (Home: 1–1; Road: 2–0)
Preseason: 3–1 (home: 1–1; road: 2–0)

Game	Date	Team	Score	High points	High rebounds	High assists	Location Attendance	Record
1	October 9	Guanghzou	W 142–95	Kawhi Leonard (18)	Chris Paul (6)	James Harden (9)	Frontwave Arena; 5,993	1–0
2	October 12	Denver	L 94–102	Kawhi Leonard (17)	Ivica Zubac (10)	James Harden (11)	Intuit Dome; 13,951	1–1
3	October 15	@ Sacramento	W 109–91	John Collins (24)	Ivica Zubac (8)	Chris Paul (10)	Golden 1 Center; 16,016	2–1
4	October 17	@ Golden State	W 106–103	Kobe Sanders (25)	Yanic Konan Niederhäuser (11)	TyTy Washington Jr. (5)	Chase Center; 18,064	3–1

2025–26 preseason schedule

=== Regular season ===
2025–26 game log
Total: 42–40 (Home: 23–18; Road: 19–22)
October: 3–2 (home: 3–0; road: 0–2)

Game	Date	Team	Score	High points	High rebounds	High assists	Location Attendance	Record
1	October 22	@ Utah	L 108–129	Ivica Zubac (19)	Collins, Zubac (7)	James Harden (11)	Delta Center; 20,122	0–1
2	October 24	Phoenix	W 129–102	James Harden (30)	Harden, Lopez (7)	Chris Paul (8)	Intuit Dome; 17,927	1–1
3	October 26	Portland	W 114–107	Kawhi Leonard (30)	Kawhi Leonard (10)	James Harden (13)	Intuit Dome; 17,927	2–1
4	October 28	@ Golden State	L 79–98	James Harden (20)	Ivica Zubac (12)	Konan Niederhäuser, Paul (2)	Chase Center; 18,064	2–2
5	October 31	New Orleans	W 126–124	Kawhi Leonard (34)	Ivica Zubac (11)	James Harden (14)	Intuit Dome; 16,083	3–2

November: 2–13 (home: 0–7; road: 2–6)

Game	Date	Team	Score	High points	High rebounds	High assists	Location Attendance	Record
6	November 3	Miami	L 119–120	Kawhi Leonard (27)	Ivica Zubac (18)	James Harden (8)	Intuit Dome; 17,045	3–3
7	November 4	Oklahoma City	L 107–126	James Harden (25)	Ivica Zubac (7)	James Harden (6)	Intuit Dome; 17,195	3–4
8	November 6	@ Phoenix	L 102–115	Ivica Zubac (23)	Ivica Zubac (11)	Kris Dunn (6)	Mortgage Matchup Center; 17,071	3–5
9	November 8	Phoenix	L 103–114	Ivica Zubac (21)	Ivica Zubac (15)	James Harden (13)	Intuit Dome; 17,927	3–6
10	November 10	Atlanta	L 102–105	James Harden (35)	Ivica Zubac (12)	James Harden (11)	Intuit Dome; 16,368	3–7
11	November 12	Denver	L 116–130	James Harden (23)	Ivica Zubac (9)	Bogdan Bogdanović (6)	Intuit Dome; 17,927	3–8
12	November 14	@ Dallas	W 133–127 (2OT)	James Harden (41)	James Harden (14)	James Harden (11)	American Airlines Center; 18,624	4–8
13	November 16	@ Boston	L 118–121	James Harden (37)	Ivica Zubac (12)	James Harden (8)	TD Garden; 19,156	4–9
14	November 17	@ Philadelphia	L 108–110	James Harden (28)	Ivica Zubac (13)	Bogdanović, Dunn, Harden (5)	Xfinity Mobile Arena; 18,008	4–10
15	November 20	@ Orlando	L 101–129	James Harden (31)	Ivica Zubac (19)	James Harden (8)	Kia Center; 17,801	4–11
16	November 22	@ Charlotte	W 131–116	James Harden (55)	Christie, Zubac (9)	Chris Paul (8)	Spectrum Center; 18,721	5–11
17	November 23	@ Cleveland	L 105–120	Ivica Zubac (33)	Ivica Zubac (18)	James Harden (6)	Rocket Arena; 19,432	5–12
18	November 25	@ L.A. Lakers	L 118–135	James Harden (29)	Ivica Zubac (10)	James Harden (9)	Crypto.com Arena; 18,997	5–13
19	November 28	Memphis	L 107–112	Kawhi Leonard (39)	Ivica Zubac (12)	James Harden (11)	Intuit Dome; 17,927	5–14
20	November 29	Dallas	L 110–114	Kawhi Leonard (30)	Ivica Zubac (11)	James Harden (11)	Intuit Dome; 17,927	5–15

December: 6–6 (home: 4–1; road: 2–5)

Game	Date	Team	Score	High points	High rebounds	High assists	Location Attendance	Record
21	December 1	@ Miami	L 123–140	Kawhi Leonard (36)	Ivica Zubac (13)	Kris Dunn (5)	Kaseya Center; 19,600	5–16
22	December 3	@ Atlanta	W 115–92	James Harden (27)	Ivica Zubac (17)	James Harden (9)	State Farm Arena; 16,470	6–16
23	December 5	@ Memphis	L 98–107	Kawhi Leonard (24)	Kawhi Leonard (8)	James Harden (7)	FedExForum; 15,052	6–17
24	December 6	@ Minnesota	L 106–109	James Harden (34)	Ivica Zubac (13)	James Harden (6)	Target Center; 17,506	6–18
25	December 11	@ Houston	L 113–115	Ivica Zubac (33)	Kawhi Leonard (9)	James Harden (7)	Toyota Center; 18,055	6–19
26	December 15	Memphis	L 103–121	Kawhi Leonard (21)	Ivica Zubac (13)	James Harden (6)	Intuit Dome; 17,927	6–20
27	December 17	@ Oklahoma City	L 101–122	Kawhi Leonard (22)	Ivica Zubac (11)	Kawhi Leonard (6)	Paycom Center; 18,203	6–21
28	December 20	L.A. Lakers	W 103–88	Kawhi Leonard (32)	Collins, Leonard (12)	James Harden (10)	Intuit Dome; 17,927	7–21
29	December 23	Houston	W 128–108	Kawhi Leonard (41)	Kawhi Leonard (8)	James Harden (6)	Intuit Dome; 17,927	8–21
30	December 26	@ Portland	W 119–103	James Harden (34)	Kawhi Leonard (8)	Harden, Leonard (6)	Moda Center; 17,839	9–21
31	December 28	Detroit	W 112–99	Kawhi Leonard (55)	Kawhi Leonard (11)	James Harden (7)	Intuit Dome; 17,927	10–21
32	December 30	Sacramento	W 131–90	Kawhi Leonard (33)	Tied (6)	Harden, Leonard (5)	Intuit Dome; 17,927	11–21

January: 11–4 (home: 6–1; road: 5–3)

Game	Date	Team	Score	High points	High rebounds	High assists	Location Attendance	Record
33	January 1	Utah	W 118–101	Kawhi Leonard (45)	John Collins (11)	James Harden (7)	Intuit Dome; 17,927	12–21
34	January 3	Boston	L 115–146	Collins, Leonard (22)	Ivica Zubac (7)	James Harden (12)	Intuit Dome; 17,927	12–22
35	January 5	Golden State	W 103–102	Kawhi Leonard (24)	Kawhi Leonard (12)	Kris Dunn (6)	Intuit Dome; 17,927	13–22
36	January 7	@ New York	L 111–123	Kawhi Leonard (25)	Ivica Zubac (11)	James Harden (9)	Madison Square Garden; 19,812	13–23
37	January 9	@ Brooklyn	W 121–105	James Harden (31)	Ivica Zubac (6)	James Harden (6)	Barclays Center; 17,548	14–23
38	January 10	@ Detroit	W 98–92	Kawhi Leonard (26)	Kawhi Leonard (8)	James Harden (7)	Little Caesars Arena; 20,062	15–23
39	January 12	Charlotte	W 117–109	Kawhi Leonard (35)	Ivica Zubac (11)	James Harden (10)	Intuit Dome; 17,927	16–23
40	January 14	Washington	W 119–105	Kawhi Leonard (33)	Jordan Miller (10)	James Harden (8)	Intuit Dome; 15,452	17–23
41	January 16	@ Toronto	W 121–117	James Harden (31)	Ivica Zubac (14)	James Harden (10)	Scotiabank Arena; 18,934	18–23
42	January 19	@ Washington	W 110–106	James Harden (36)	Ivica Zubac (12)	James Harden (9)	Capital One Arena; 16,630	19–23
43	January 20	@ Chicago	L 110–138	James Harden (24)	Ivica Zubac (11)	Dunn, Harden (6)	United Center; 18,536	19–24
44	January 22	L.A. Lakers	W 112–104	Kawhi Leonard (24)	Ivica Zubac (19)	James Harden (10)	Intuit Dome; 17,927	20–24
45	January 25	Brooklyn	W 126–89	Kawhi Leonard (28)	Ivica Zubac (10)	James Harden (8)	Intuit Dome; 17,927	21–24
46	January 27	@ Utah	W 115–103	Kawhi Leonard (21)	Leonard, Zubac (7)	James Harden (10)	Delta Center; 18,186	22–24
47	January 30	@ Denver	L 109–122	James Harden (25)	Ivica Zubac (7)	James Harden (9)	Ball Arena; 20,016	22–25

February: 5–6 (home: 1–4; road: 4–2)

Game	Date	Team	Score	High points	High rebounds	High assists	Location Attendance	Record
48	February 1	@ Phoenix	W 117–93	Kawhi Leonard (25)	Ivica Zubac (20)	Kawhi Leonard (5)	Mortgage Matchup Center; 17,071	23–25
49	February 2	Philadelphia	L 113–128	Kawhi Leonard (29)	Ivica Zubac (9)	Dunn, Leonard (6)	Intuit Dome; 17,927	23–26
50	February 4	Cleveland	L 91–124	Kawhi Leonard (25)	Yanic Konan Niederhäuser (8)	Kris Dunn (6)	Intuit Dome; 17,927	23–27
51	February 6	@ Sacramento	W 114–111	Kawhi Leonard (31)	Leonard, Lopez (9)	Kawhi Leonard (7)	Golden 1 Center; 16,665	24–27
52	February 8	@ Minnesota	W 115–96	Kawhi Leonard (41)	Kawhi Leonard (8)	Kris Dunn (6)	Target Center; 18,978	25–27
53	February 10	@ Houston	L 95–102	Kawhi Leonard (24)	Collins, Leonard (8)	Kris Dunn (7)	Toyota Center; 18,055	25–28
54	February 11	@ Houston	W 105–102	Kawhi Leonard (27)	Kawhi Leonard (12)	Kris Dunn (6)	Toyota Center; 18,055	26–28
All-Star Game
55	February 19	Denver	W 115–114	Bennedict Mathurin (38)	John Collins (12)	Kris Dunn (8)	Intuit Dome; 17,927	27–28
56	February 20	@ L.A. Lakers	L 122–125	Kawhi Leonard (31)	Brook Lopez (10)	Kris Dunn (8)	Crypto.com Arena; 18,997	27–29
57	February 22	Orlando	L 109–111	Kawhi Leonard (37)	Bennedict Mathurin (9)	Bennedict Mathurin (5)	Intuit Dome; 17,927	27–30
58	February 26	Minnesota	L 88–94	Derrick Jones Jr. (18)	Tied (6)	Kris Dunn (7)	Intuit Dome; 17,649	27–31

March: 12–6 (home: 7–3; road: 5–3)

Game	Date	Team	Score	High points	High rebounds	High assists	Location Attendance	Record
59	March 1	New Orleans	W 137–117	Kawhi Leonard (23)	Collins, Lopez (7)	Jordan Miller (8)	Intuit Dome; 17,003	28–31
60	March 2	@ Golden State	W 114–101	Kawhi Leonard (23)	Yanic Konan Niederhäuser (9)	Kris Dunn (7)	Chase Center; 18,064	29–31
61	March 4	Indiana	W 130–107	Kawhi Leonard (29)	Leonard, Mathurin (8)	Darius Garland (8)	Intuit Dome; 17,093	30–31
62	March 6	@ San Antonio	L 112–116	Kawhi Leonard (30)	Kawhi Leonard (9)	Jordan Miller (6)	Frost Bank Center; 18,711	30–32
63	March 7	@ Memphis	W 123–120	Kawhi Leonard (28)	Isaiah Jackson (12)	Darius Garland (6)	FedExForum; 16,037	31–32
64	March 9	New York	W 126–118	Kawhi Leonard (29)	Tied (7)	Kawhi Leonard (8)	Intuit Dome; 17,927	32–32
65	March 11	Minnesota	W 153–128	Kawhi Leonard (45)	Isaiah Jackson (6)	Jordan Miller (7)	Intuit Dome; 16,871	33–32
66	March 13	Chicago	W 119–108	Kawhi Leonard (28)	Jackson, Lopez (7)	Kris Dunn (6)	Intuit Dome; 17,927	34–32
67	March 14	Sacramento	L 109–118	Kawhi Leonard (31)	Isaiah Jackson (8)	Darius Garland (7)	Intuit Dome; 17,420	34–33
68	March 16	San Antonio	L 115–119	Darius Garland (25)	Collins, Miller (9)	Darius Garland (10)	Intuit Dome; 17,927	34–34
69	March 18	@ New Orleans	L 109–124	Kawhi Leonard (25)	Kawhi Leonard (8)	Darius Garland (6)	Smoothie King Center; 16,546	34–35
70	March 19	@ New Orleans	W 105–99	Derrick Jones Jr. (22)	Collins, Miller (8)	Jordan Miller (5)	Smoothie King Center; 15,395	34–36
71	March 21	@ Dallas	W 138–131 (OT)	Darius Garland (41)	Brook Lopez (9)	Darius Garland (11)	American Airlines Center; 19,365	35–36
72	March 23	Milwaukee	W 129–96	Kawhi Leonard (28)	Jones Jr., Leonard (5)	Darius Garland (6)	Intuit Dome; 16,515	36–36
73	March 25	Toronto	W 119–94	Kawhi Leonard (27)	Derrick Jones Jr. (7)	Garland, Mathurin (6)	Intuit Dome; 17,927	37–36
74	March 27	@ Indiana	W 114–113	Darius Garland (30)	Brook Lopez (9)	Darius Garland (5)	Gainbridge Fieldhouse; 16,645	38–36
75	March 29	@ Milwaukee	W 127–113	Bennedict Mathurin (28)	Kawhi Leonard (8)	Darius Garland (11)	Fiserv Forum; 17,341	39–36
76	March 31	Portland	L 104–114	Kawhi Leonard (23)	Kawhi Leonard (8)	Darius Garland (4)	Intuit Dome; 17,927	39–37

April: 3–3 (home: 2–2; road: 1–1)

Game	Date	Team	Score	High points	High rebounds	High assists	Location Attendance	Record
77	April 2	San Antonio	L 99–118	Kawhi Leonard (24)	Bennedict Mathurin (7)	Kawhi Leonard (5)	Intuit Dome; 17,927	39–38
78	April 5	@ Sacramento	W 138–109	Kawhi Leonard (26)	Tied (6)	Garland, Miller (6)	Golden 1 Center; 15,014	40–38
79	April 7	Dallas	W 116–103	Kawhi Leonard (34)	Brook Lopez (11)	Darius Garland (4)	Intuit Dome; 17,927	41–38
80	April 8	Oklahoma City	L 110–128	Kawhi Leonard (20)	John Collins (9)	Dunn, Miller (6)	Intuit Dome; 17,927	41–39
81	April 10	@ Portland	L 97–116	Kawhi Leonard (24)	Kawhi Leonard (8)	Darius Garland (7)	Moda Center; 19,490	41–40
82	April 12	Golden State	W 115–110	Bennedict Mathurin (20)	Collins, Mathurin (9)	Bennedict Mathurin (8)	Intuit Dome; 17,927	42–40

2025–26 season schedule

=== Play-in ===
2026 play-in game log
Total: 0–1 (Home: 0–1; Road: 0–0)
Play-in: 0–1 (home: 0–1; road: 0–0)

Game	Date	Team	Score	High points	High rebounds	High assists	Location Attendance	Record
1	April 15	Golden State	L 121–126	Bennedict Mathurin (23)	John Collins (9)	Kris Dunn (10)	Intuit Dome; 17,927	0–1

2025–26 season schedule

=== NBA Cup ===
==== West Group B ====
Pos	Team	Pld	W	L	PF	PA	PD	Qualification
1	Los Angeles Lakers	4	4	0	499	453	+46	Advanced to knockout rounds
2	Memphis Grizzlies	4	3	1	464	450	+14	
3	Los Angeles Clippers	4	2	2	465	485	−20	
4	Dallas Mavericks	4	1	3	455	476	−21	
5	New Orleans Pelicans	4	0	4	465	484	−19	

Source: NBA

== Player statistics ==
Legend
GP	Games played	GS	Games started	MPG	Minutes per game
FG%	Field-goal percentage	3P%	3-point field-goal percentage	FT%	Free-throw percentage
RPG	Rebounds per game	APG	Assists per game	SPG	Steals per game
BPG	Blocks per game	PPG	Points per game

=== Regular season ===
Player	GP	GS	MPG	FG%	3P%	FT%	RPG	APG	SPG	BPG	PPG
Patrick Baldwin Jr.^{†}	2	0	6.0	.750	.667	1.000	.5	.0	.0	.0	5.0
Dalano Banton^{†}	2	0	5.0	.750	–	–	.5	1.0	.5	.0	3.0
Nicolas Batum	74	6	17.5	.403	.404	.818	2.5	.9	.6	.3	4.0
Bradley Beal	6	6	20.2	.375	.368	.750	.8	1.7	.5	.0	8.2
Bogdan Bogdanović	23	3	19.7	.388	.347	.800	2.6	2.2	.4	.1	7.4
Kobe Brown^{†}	34	0	8.7	.393	.265	.808	1.6	.8	.3	.1	2.9
Cam Christie	55	0	8.7	.381	.245	.760	1.4	.6	.3	.1	2.8
John Collins	69	56	27.1	.552	.406	.766	5.3	1.0	.9	.7	13.6
RayJ Dennis^{†}	1	0	4.0	–	–	–	2.0	.0	.0	.0	.0
Kris Dunn	82	68	27.2	.476	.374	.765	3.3	3.6	1.6	.2	7.3
Darius Garland^{†}	19	17	29.1	.471	.438	.860	2.3	6.4	1.2	.3	19.9
James Harden^{†}	44	44	35.4	.419	.347	.901	4.8	8.1	1.3	.4	25.4
Isaiah Jackson^{†}	17	0	15.9	.764	.000	.548	4.6	1.2	.6	1.2	7.5
Derrick Jones Jr.	50	45	27.0	.499	.359	.763	3.5	1.4	.9	1.0	10.1
Yanic Konan Niederhäuser	41	0	10.3	.640	.200	.758	2.9	.3	.1	.7	4.3
Kawhi Leonard	65	65	32.1	.505	.387	.892	6.4	3.6	1.9	.4	27.9
Brook Lopez	75	40	21.8	.428	.360	.757	3.6	1.3	.6	1.2	8.5
Bennedict Mathurin^{†}	26	1	28.0	.426	.207	.858	5.5	2.5	1.0	.3	17.4
Jordan Miller	60	1	22.1	.531	.345	.777	3.0	2.3	.8	.2	10.0
Norchad Omier	6	0	4.0	.700	.000	1.000	1.2	.3	.2	.0	2.8
Chris Paul	16	0	14.3	.321	.333	.500	1.8	3.3	.7	.0	2.9
Sean Pedulla	7	0	4.4	.333	.300	–	.4	.7	.0	.0	1.9
Kobe Sanders	68	16	19.9	.466	.408	.826	2.3	1.6	.7	.1	7.3
Jahmyl Telfort	8	0	4.0	.000	.000	.250	.4	.1	.1	.0	.1
TyTy Washington Jr.	16	0	5.5	.474	.375	–	.4	1.1	.4	.2	1.3
Ivica Zubac^{†}	43	42	30.9	.613	–	.705	11.0	2.2	.4	.8	14.4

- ^{†} Denotes player spent time with another team in the season. Stats reflect time with the Clippers only.

== Transactions ==
=== Trades ===
Date	Trade		Ref.
June 26, 2025	To Los Angeles Clippers: Draft rights to Kobe Sanders (No. 50)	To New York Knicks: Draft rights to Mohamed Diawara (No. 51) Draft rights to Luka Mitrović (2015 No. 60)	
July 7, 2025	Three-team trade		
July 7, 2025	To Los Angeles Clippers: John Collins	To Miami Heat: Norman Powell	
July 7, 2025	To Utah Jazz: Kyle Anderson; Kevin Love; 2027 second-round pick (from LA Clippers)		
February 4, 2026	To Los Angeles Clippers: Darius Garland; 2026 second-round pick (from Cleveland)	To Cleveland Cavaliers: James Harden	
February 5, 2026	Three-team trade		
February 5, 2026	To Los Angeles Clippers: Draft rights to Vanja Marinković (2019 No. 60)	To Toronto Raptors: Chris Paul	
February 5, 2026	To Brooklyn Nets: Ochai Agbaji; 2032 second-round pick (from Toronto); Cash considerations (from Los Angeles)		
February 5, 2026	To Los Angeles Clippers: Bennedict Mathurin; Isaiah Jackson; 2026 first-round pick (Note: LA Clippers will receive the pick if it's No. 5–9. If the pick doesn't convey, they'll receive Indiana's 2031 first-round pick.); 2028 second-round pick (from Dallas); ~~2029 first-round pick (from Indiana)~~	To Indiana Pacers: Ivica Zubac; Kobe Brown	

=== Free agency ===
==== Re-signed ====
Date	Player	Ref.
July 6	Nicolas Batum	
July 6	James Harden	
July 29	Jordan Miller (two-way contract, later converted to a standard 2-year contract on February 18) (previously waived on July 8)	

==== Additions ====
Date	Player	Former Team	Ref.
July 6	Brook Lopez	Milwaukee Bucks	
July 18	Bradley Beal	Phoenix Suns	
July 21	Chris Paul	San Antonio Spurs	
August 11	Jason Preston	Utah Jazz	
October 18	Jahmyl Telfort (previously signed to training camp contract on June 27)	Butler Bulldogs	
December 5	RayJ Dennis (Two-way contract)	Indiana Pacers	
December 27	TyTy Washington Jr. (Two-way contract) (previously signed to training camp contract on October 14 and waived on October 18)	San Diego Clippers	
January 16	Patrick Baldwin Jr. (10-day contract) (previously signed to training camp contract on October 2 and waived on October 18)	San Diego Clippers	
February 8	Dalano Banton (10-day contract)	Texas Legends	
February 20	Sean Pedulla (Two-way contract)	Rip City Remix	
February 20	Norchad Omier (Two-way contract)	Cleveland Charge	

==== Subtractions ====
Player	Reason	New Team	Ref.
Patty Mills	Free agency	(Spain) CB Canarias	
Drew Eubanks	Waived	Sacramento Kings	
Seth Lundy	Waived	Toronto Raptors	
Amir Coffey	Free agency	Milwaukee Bucks	
Ben Simmons	Free agency	Sacramento Kings	
Jason Preston	Waived	San Diego Clippers	
Jahmyl Telfort	Waived	San Diego Clippers	
RayJ Dennis	Waived	Atlanta Hawks	
Patrick Baldwin Jr.	Contract expired	Philadelphia 76ers	
Dalano Banton	Contract expired	Boston Celtics	
