= RayJ Dennis =

American basketball player (born 2001)

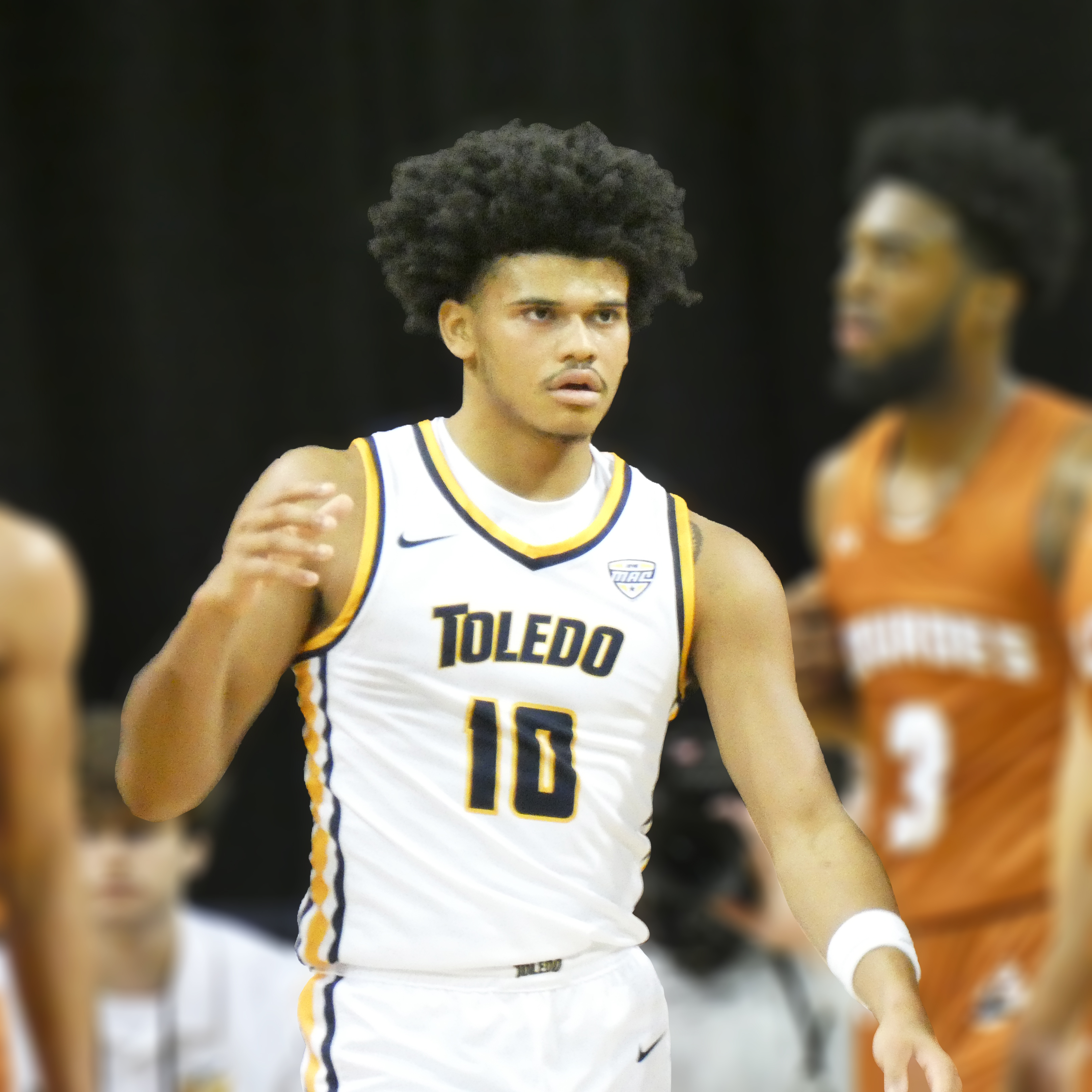
- Dennis with Toledo in 2022

No. 10 – Atlanta Hawks
- Position: Point guard
- League: NBA

Personal information
- Born: March 30, 2001 (age 25) Plainfield, Illinois, U.S.
- Listed height: 6 ft 1 in (1.85 m)
- Listed weight: 180 lb (82 kg)

Career information
- High school: Montini Catholic (Lombard, Illinois); Oswego East (Oswego, Illinois)
- College: Boise State (2019–2021); Toledo (2021–2023); Baylor (2023–2024)
- NBA draft: 2024: undrafted
- Playing career: 2024–present

Career history
- 2024–2025: San Diego Clippers
- 2025: Indiana Pacers
- 2025: →Indiana Mad Ants/Noblesville Boom
- 2025: Los Angeles Clippers
- 2025: San Diego Clippers
- 2025–present: Atlanta Hawks
- 2025–present: →College Park Skyhawks

Career highlights
- All-NBA G League Third Team (2026); NBA G League All-Rookie Team (2025); MAC Player of the Year (2023); First-team All-MAC (2023); Second-team All-Big 12 (2024)
- Stats at NBA.com
- Stats at Basketball Reference

Raymond "RayJ" Patterson Dennis (born March 30, 2001) is an American professional basketball player for the Atlanta Hawks of the National Basketball Association (NBA), on a two-way contract with the College Park Skyhawks of the NBA G League. He played college basketball for the Boise State Broncos, the Toledo Rockets and the Baylor Bears.

== High school career ==
Before high school, Dennis attended Heritage Grove Middle School and Murphy Jr. High in Plainfield, Illinois. Dennis attended Montini Catholic High School for two seasons. For his junior year, he transferred to Oswego East High School and averaged 17.2 points and 4.9 assists per game. As a senior, he averaged 23.2 points, 5.1 assists, 4.9 rebounds and 2.5 steals per game. Dennis committed to play college basketball at Boise State, choosing the Broncos over 26 Division I offers.

== College career ==
As a freshman, Dennis averaged 4.1 points, 1.8 rebounds and 1.8 assists per game. He posted 8.6 points, 3.0 rebounds and a team-best 2.9 assists per game as a sophomore. Dennis opted to transfer to Toledo after the season. Dennis averaged 12.7 points, 4.0 assists and 5.6 rebounds per game as a junior. On March 3, 2023, he scored a career-high 32 points to go with seven assists in a 87–81 win over Ball State. As a senior, Dennis averaged 19.5 points, 4.3 rebounds and 5.8 assists per game, leading Toledo to a 27–8 record and Mid-American Conference (MAC) regular-season championship. He was named MAC Player of the Year. Following the season he transferred to Baylor, choosing the Bears over Illinois, Michigan and Utah.

== Professional career ==
After going undrafted in the 2024 NBA draft, Dennis joined the Los Angeles Clippers for the 2024 NBA Summer League and on September 6, 2024, he signed with the team. However, on October 9, he was waived. On October 19, he signed a two-way contract with the Washington Wizards, but was waived two days later. On October 28, he joined the San Diego Clippers.

On January 3, 2025, Dennis signed a two-way contract with the Indiana Pacers. He made 11 appearances for the Pacers during the 2024–25 NBA season, averaging 2.7 points, 1.1 rebounds and 1.3 assists.

Dennis played in 13 games for Indiana during the 2025–26 NBA season, posting averages of 4.9 points, 1.6 rebounds and 2.0 assists. Dennis was waived by the Pacers on November 30, 2025, following the signing of Ethan Thompson.

On December 5, 2025, Dennis signed a two-way contract with the Los Angeles Clippers. He made one appearance for Los Angeles, going scoreless in four minutes during a 122–101 loss to the Oklahoma City Thunder on December 18. On December 29, Dennis was waived by the Clippers.

On December 31, 2025, Dennis signed a two-way contract with the Atlanta Hawks. On January 16, 2026, while playing for the College Park Skyhawks, Dennis recorded 46 points and 15 assists in a 140–155 loss to the Delaware Blue Coats.

== Career statistics ==
Legend
| GP | Games played | GS | Games started | MPG | Minutes per game |
| FG% | Field goal percentage | 3P% | 3-point field goal percentage | FT% | Free throw percentage |
| RPG | Rebounds per game | APG | Assists per game | SPG | Steals per game |
| BPG | Blocks per game | PPG | Points per game | **Bold** | Career high |

=== NBA ===
| Year | Team | GP | GS | MPG | FG% | 3P% | FT% | RPG | APG | SPG | BPG | PPG |
|---|---|---|---|---|---|---|---|---|---|---|---|---|
| 2024–25 | Indiana | 11 | 0 | 6.4 | .333 | .286 | **1.000** | 1.1 | 1.3 | **.6** | .2 | 2.7 |
| 2025–26 | Indiana | **13** | 0 | **12.9** | .306 | **.316** | .889 | 1.6 | 2.0 | .2 | **.3** | **4.9** |
| 2025–26 | L.A. Clippers | 1 | 0 | 4.0 | — | — | — | **2.0** | .0 | .0 | .0 | .0 |
| 2025–26 | Atlanta | 3 | 0 | 11.3 | **.364** | .286 | — | 1.0 | **2.3** | .3 | .0 | 3.3 |
| Career | | 28 | 0 | 9.9 | .319 | .303 | .909 | 1.4 | 1.7 | .4 | .2 | 3.7 |

=== College ===
| Year | Team | GP | GS | MPG | FG% | 3P% | FT% | RPG | APG | SPG | BPG | PPG |
|---|---|---|---|---|---|---|---|---|---|---|---|---|
| 2019–20 | Boise State | 32 | 15 | 17.4 | .359 | .260 | **.800** | 1.8 | 1.8 | .4 | .1 | 4.1 |
| 2020–21 | Boise State | 28 | 25 | 27.2 | .442 | .291 | .688 | 3.0 | 2.9 | 1.2 | **.2** | 8.6 |
| 2021–22 | Toledo | 34 | 34 | 33.7 | **.503** | .321 | .716 | **5.6** | 4.0 | .8 | .1 | 12.7 |
| 2022–23 | Toledo | **35** | **35** | 33.9 | .484 | **.366** | .769 | 4.3 | 5.8 | **1.5** | **.2** | **19.5** |
| 2023–24 | Baylor | **35** | **35** | **34.3** | .479 | .328 | .731 | 3.9 | **6.7** | 1.4 | .1 | 13.6 |
| Career | | 164 | 144 | 29.6 | .472 | .321 | .741 | 3.8 | 4.3 | 1.1 | .1 | 12.0 |
