= Matas Buzelis =

American basketball player (born 2004)

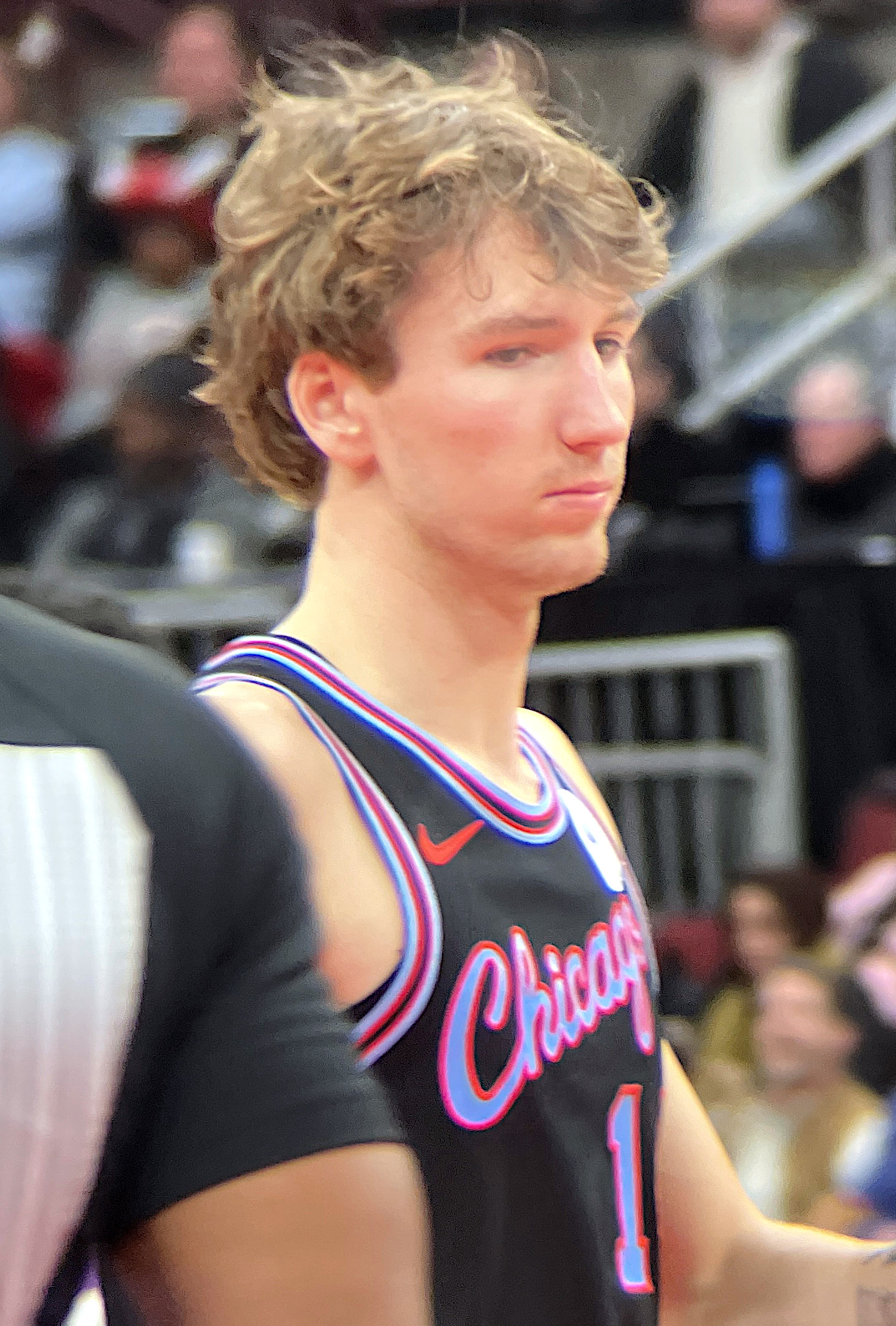
- Buzelis with the Bulls in 2026

No. 14 – Chicago Bulls
- Position: Power forward / small forward
- League: NBA

Personal information
- Born: October 13, 2004 (age 22) Chicago, Illinois, U.S.
- Listed height: 6 ft 9 in (2.06 m)
- Listed weight: 196 lb (89 kg)

Career information
- High school: Brewster Academy (Wolfeboro, New Hampshire); Sunrise Christian Academy (Bel Aire, Kansas)
- NBA draft: 2024: 1st round, 11th overall pick
- Drafted by: Chicago Bulls
- Playing career: 2023–present

Career history
- 2023–2024: NBA G League Ignite
- 2024–present: Chicago Bulls
- 2024–2025: →Windy City Bulls

Career highlights
- NBA All-Rookie Second Team (2025); NBA G League Next Up Game (2024); McDonald's All-American (2023); Jordan Brand Classic (2023); Nike Hoop Summit (2022)
- Stats at NBA.com
- Stats at Basketball Reference

Matas Arvidas Buzelis (born October 13, 2004) is a Lithuanian American professional basketball player for the Chicago Bulls of the National Basketball Association (NBA). He was selected 11th overall by the Bulls in the 2024 NBA draft.

== Early life and high school career ==
Buzelis was born in Chicago on October 13, 2004. Both of his parents played basketball professionally in Lithuania before immigrating to the United States and settling in the Chicago area, where Buzelis was born and raised. During his childhood, Buzelis attended gymnastics school with his brother and sister. Later in the same school, he attended swimming and had the best results among under-10 and under-12 breaststroke swimmers in the state of Illinois.

Buzelis initially attended Hinsdale Central High School in suburban Hinsdale and played on their sophomore team as a freshman. He transferred to Brewster Academy, a boarding school in Wolfeboro, New Hampshire, midway through the start of the first semester of his sophomore year after Hinsdale Central's basketball season was postponed due to concerns related to the COVID-19 pandemic. As a junior, Buzelis was named the 2022 New Hampshire Gatorade Player of the Year after averaging 11.4 points, 5.9 rebounds, 2.1 assists, 1.3 blocks and 1.2 steals per game. He was also selected to play for Team World in the 2022 Nike Hoop Summit.

Buzelis transferred to Sunrise Christian Academy in Bel Aire, Kansas, before the start of his senior year. During his senior year, he averaged 15.7 points and 5.6 rebounds per game while shooting 54 percent from the field, 42.4 percent from three-point range and 80 percent from the free throw line.

Buzelis was selected to play in the 2023 McDonald's All-American Boys Game. He also took part in the Basketball Without Borders camp during the 2023 NBA All-Star weekend and was named the camp's MVP.

=== Recruiting ===
Buzelis was a consensus five-star recruit and one of the top players in the 2023 class, according to major recruiting services. He ultimately chose to play professionally for NBA G League Ignite. Buzelis had also considered playing college basketball for Kentucky, North Carolina, Florida State and Wake Forest.

College recruiting
Name	Hometown	School	Height	Weight	Commit date
Matas Buzelis; SF	Chicago, IL	Sunrise Christian Academy (KS)	6 ft 10 in (2.08 m)	190 lb (86 kg)	—
Matas Buzelis; SF	Recruit ratings: Rivals: 247Sports: ESPN: (93)				
Overall recruit ranking: Rivals: 4 247Sports: 7 ESPN: 5
Note: In many cases, Scout, Rivals, 247Sports, On3, and ESPN may conflict in their listings of height and weight.; In these cases, the average was taken. ESPN grades are on a 100-point scale.; Sources: "2023 Team Ranking". Rivals.

== Professional career ==
=== NBA G League Ignite (2023–2024) ===
On May 31, 2023, Buzelis signed with the NBA G League Ignite. Buzelis for the first time was selected to play in the 2024 Rising Stars Challenge as a part of the Team Detlef with which he lost in the final 25–13 to the Team Jalen. During the 2023–24 NBA G League season Buzelis averaged 14.1 points, 6.6 rebounds and 1.9 assists per game.

=== Chicago Bulls (2024–present) ===
==== 2024–2025 season ====
Buzelis was selected with the 11th overall pick by the Chicago Bulls during the 2024 NBA draft. Buzelis reportedly worked his way as a projected top 5 in the pre-draft process as teams were interested in his size and feel for the game putting him as a top 5 pick commonly to the Detroit Pistons who decided to go with Ignite teammate Ron Holland. Other teams passed on Buzelis dropping him to his hometown Bulls. He signed a rookie-scale contract with the Bulls on July 2, 2024.

Buzelis made his NBA debut on October 23, 2024, in a 123–111 loss to the New Orleans Pelicans. On January 20, 2025, he committed to the NBA Slam Dunk Contest during the 2025 All-Star weekend, becoming the first Lithuanian player to do so. He also became the first Bulls player to participate in the contest since Tyrus Thomas in 2007. On February 4, Buzelis scored 24 points while shooting 10-for-10 from the field in a 133–124 win over the Miami Heat. In addition to participation in the NBA Slam Dunk Contest, Buzelis was also selected to play for Mitch Richmond's team during the 2025 Rising Stars Challenge, where his team was eliminated in the semifinal 40–39. On March 22, he put up a career-high 31 points in a 146–115 victory over the Los Angeles Lakers. On March 29, Buzelis scored 28 points, grabbed nine rebounds, dished out six assists against the Dallas Mavericks and became the third Bulls rookie to achieve such game statistics, the other two being Michael Jordan and Charles Oakley. On April 4, Buzelis put up his first career double-double with 12 points and 12 rebounds in a 118–113 win over the Portland Trail Blazers. When his playing time increased in the second half of his first NBA season and Buzelis started in 31 games, his averages were 13 points (47.3 percent from the field) and 4.5 rebounds per game. His debut season in the NBA ended when the Bulls in the 2025 NBA play-in tournament lost the first game 90–109 to the Miami Heat and failed to qualify for the 2025 NBA playoffs. On May 20, 2025, Buzelis was included to the NBA All-Rookie Second Team.

==== 2025–2026 season ====
Buzelis began his second NBA season with a dominating performance of 21 points, 6 rebounds, 3 blocks and together with Nikola Vučević (28 points) led the Bulls to a season-opening 115–111 victory versus the Detroit Pistons. When the Bulls traded their long-term players Nikola Vučević, Coby White, and Ayo Dosunmu just before the NBA trade deadline, Buzelis's role in the team further increased and he became Bulls' leading scorer. On February 13, Buzelis was selected to play for the Vince Carter's team during the 2026 Rising Stars Challenge and his team won the tournament. On February 21, Buzelis achieved a new career-high by blocking six shots, along with scoring 15 points, grabbing six rebounds, making two steals, and dishing out three assists, however the Bulls lost the game 126–110 to the Detroit Pistons. On February 24, Buzelis set a new career-high in scoring with 32 points against the Charlotte Hornets, however the Bulls lost the game 131–99. On March 10, Buzelis set another career-high by scoring 41 points, along with six rebounds, two steals, two assists, two blocks, and led the Bulls to a 130–124 victory over the Golden State Warriors. He became only the third Bulls player in history to score at least 40 points being 21 years old or younger, the other two being Michael Jordan and Elton Brand. Moreover, he matched Linas Kleiza's second-highest scoring performance for a Lithuanian player in the NBA and was just one point away from Domantas Sabonis' all-time scoring record of 42 points. Buzelis role in the team during his second NBA season significantly increased, his scoring input nearly doubled, however the Bulls finished 12th in the Eastern Conference and lost all chances to qualify for the 2026 NBA playoffs.

2026-2027 season

Buzelis struggled at the start of his third NBA season with the Chicago Bulls. In a post-game interview he stated that the beginning of both his previous seasons were tough, stating that this year is harder due to new players coming in to the team (new players included: Norman Powell, rookie Caleb Wilson, etc.) He claimed that it is a process and promised that he would figure it out.

== National team career ==
On July 21, 2022, Buzelis committed to the Lithuania men's national basketball team for international competition. Later that year, the Lithuanian Basketball Federation registered Buzelis in the FIBA system as a member of the Lithuanian national team. On July 2, 2026, Buzelis debuted in an official game with the Lithuania men's national basketball team during the 2027 FIBA Basketball World Cup qualification and helped it to reach a 105–85 victory versus the Great Britain men's national basketball team.

== Career statistics ==
Legend
GP	Games played	GS	Games started	MPG	Minutes per game
FG%	Field goal percentage	3P%	3-point field goal percentage	FT%	Free throw percentage
RPG	Rebounds per game	APG	Assists per game	SPG	Steals per game
BPG	Blocks per game	PPG	Points per game	**Bold**	Career high

=== NBA ===
Year	Team	GP	GS	MPG	FG%	3P%	FT%	RPG	APG	SPG	BPG	PPG
2024–25	Chicago	**80**	31	18.9	.454	**.361**	**.815**	3.5	1.0	.4	.9	8.6
2025–26	Chicago	77	**77**	**29.2**	**.463**	.349	.786	**5.8**	**2.5**	**.7**	**1.5**	**16.3**
Career		157	108	23.9	.460	.353	.795	4.6	1.5	.5	1.2	12.4

=== NBA G League ===
Year	Team	GP	GS	MPG	FG%	3P%	FT%	RPG	APG	SPG	BPG	PPG
2023–24	NBA G League	26	26	32.0	.448	.273	.679	6.9	2.0	.8	2.1	14.3

== Personal life ==
Buzelis's maternal grandfather, Arvydas Jankauskas, is a former basketball player and coach, while his paternal grandfather, Petras Buzelis, also is a former basketball player who debuted in Žalgiris Kaunas at 19 years old, later becoming Žalgiris Kaunas's captain and winning six Lithuanian League titles and three USSR Premier Basketball League bronze medals. One of Buzelis's grandmothers, Elena Buzelienė, is an all-time great Lithuanian handball player who won two European Champions Cups.

Buzelis's mother, Kristina Jankauskaitė, played for Lithuanian youth basketball national teams and was one of the most promising basketball players of her generation. Buzelis's father, Aidas Buzelis, is a former basketball player who played for multiple Lithuanian Basketball League clubs and also worked as a physiotherapist of the Lithuania men's national basketball team.

Buzelis speaks Lithuanian in addition to English.
