= Julian Phillips (basketball) =

American basketball player (born 2003)

No. 3 – Houston Rockets
- Position: Small forward
- League: NBA

Personal information
- Born: November 5, 2003 (age 23) Killeen, Texas, U.S.
- Listed height: 6 ft 7 in (2.01 m)
- Listed weight: 205 lb (93 kg)

Career information
- High school: Blythewood (Blythewood, South Carolina); Link Academy (Branson, Missouri)
- College: Tennessee (2022–2023)
- NBA draft: 2023: 2nd round, 35th overall pick
- Drafted by: Boston Celtics
- Playing career: 2023–present

Career history
- 2023–2026: Chicago Bulls
- 2023–2024; 2025: →Windy City Bulls
- 2026: Minnesota Timberwolves
- 2026: →Iowa Wolves
- 2026–present: Houston Rockets
- 2026–present: →Rio Grande Valley Vipers

Career highlights
- McDonald's All-American (2022)
- Stats at NBA.com
- Stats at Basketball Reference

Julian Phillips (born November 5, 2003) is an American professional basketball player for the Houston Rockets of the National Basketball Association (NBA), on a two-way contract with the Rio Grande Valley Vipers of the NBA G League. He played college basketball for the Tennessee Volunteers.

== Early life and high school ==
Phillips was born in Killeen, Texas and moved to Columbia, South Carolina in the third grade after his parents, who were serving in the U.S. Army, were stationed at Fort Jackson. He initially attended Blythewood High School in Blythewood, South Carolina. Phillips transferred to Link Prep in Branson, Missouri after his junior year. He played in the 2022 McDonald's All-American Boys Game during his senior year.

Phillips was a consensus five-star recruit and one of the top 20 players in the 2022 class, according to major recruiting services. He originally committed to play college basketball at LSU over offers from Florida State, Tennessee and USC at the beginning of his senior season and signed a National Letter of Intent (NLI) during the early signing period. After LSU head coach Will Wade was fired, Phillips requested and was granted a release from his NLI and reopened his recruitment. He ultimately committed to play at Tennessee after considering offers from South Carolina and Auburn. Phillips also considered playing professionally in the NBA G League.

== College career ==
Phillips entered his freshman season at Tennessee as the Volunteers' starting small forward. He was named to the 2022 Battle 4 Atlantis All-Tournament team after averaging a team-leading 13.3 points per game. Phillips played in 32 games with 25 starts as a freshman and averaged 8.3 points and 4.7 rebounds per game. After the season, Phillips declared for the 2023 NBA draft while maintaining his eligibility. After taking part in the NBA draft combine and receiving positive feedback, he decided to remain in the draft.

== Professional career ==
=== Chicago Bulls (2023–2026) ===
Phillips was selected with the 35th overall pick in the 2023 NBA draft by the Boston Celtics, and was soon traded to the Chicago Bulls via the Washington Wizards. Phillips made 40 appearances for the Bulls during his rookie campaign, recording averages of 2.2 points, 0.9 rebounds, and 0.3 assists.

Phillips played in 79 contests (including five starts) for Chicago in the 2024–25 NBA season, averaging 4.6 points, 2.1 rebounds, and 0.5 assists. He made 35 appearances (two starts) for Chicago during the 2025–26 season, logging averages of 2.8 points, 1.3 rebounds, and 0.2 assists.

=== Minnesota Timberwolves (2026) ===
On February 4, 2026, Philips and Ayo Dosunmu were traded to the Minnesota Timberwolves in exchange for Rob Dillingham, Leonard Miller, and four second-round picks.

=== Houston Rockets (2026–present) ===
On July 25, 2026, Phillips signed with the Houston Rockets. On October 19, his contract was converted to a two-way contract.

== Career statistics ==
Legend
GP	Games played	GS	Games started	MPG	Minutes per game
FG%	Field goal percentage	3P%	3-point field goal percentage	FT%	Free throw percentage
RPG	Rebounds per game	APG	Assists per game	SPG	Steals per game
BPG	Blocks per game	PPG	Points per game	**Bold**	Career high

=== NBA ===
==== Regular season ====
Year	Team	GP	GS	MPG	FG%	3P%	FT%	RPG	APG	SPG	BPG	PPG
2023–24	Chicago	40	0	8.1	.416	.316	.684	.9	.3	.2	.2	2.2
2024–25	Chicago	**79**	**5**	**14.2**	**.446**	**.327**	.789	**2.1**	**.5**	**.5**	**.3**	**4.6**
2025–26	Chicago	35	2	9.5	.420	**.327**	**.818**	1.3	.2	**.5**	.2	2.8
2025–26	Minnesota	13	0	7.2	.424	.250	.750	.4	.2	.4	.1	3.2
Career		167	7	11.2	.435	.320	.771	1.5	.4	.4	.2	3.6

==== Playoffs ====
Year	Team	GP	GS	MPG	FG%	3P%	FT%	RPG	APG	SPG	BPG	PPG
2026	Minnesota	5	0	5.0	.333	.500	—	.2	.4	.4	.0	1.2
Career		5	0	5.0	.333	.500	—	.2	.4	.4	.0	1.2

=== College ===
Year	Team	GP	GS	MPG	FG%	3P%	FT%	RPG	APG	SPG	BPG	PPG
2022–23	Tennessee	32	25	24.1	.411	.239	.822	4.7	1.4	.6	.5	8.3
