= Joan Beringer =

French basketball player (born 2006)

No. 19 – Minnesota Timberwolves
- Position: Power forward
- League: NBA

Personal information
- Born: 11 November 2006 (age 19) Sélestat, France
- Listed height: 7 ft 0 in (2.13 m)
- Listed weight: 230 lb (104 kg)

Career information
- NBA draft: 2025: 1st round, 17th overall pick
- Drafted by: Minnesota Timberwolves
- Playing career: 2024–present

Career history
- 2024–2025: Cedevita Olimpija
- 2025–present: Minnesota Timberwolves
- 2025: →Iowa Wolves

Career highlights
- ABA League blocks leaders (2025); Slovenian League champion (2025); Slovenian Cup winner (2025)
- Stats at NBA.com
- Stats at Basketball Reference

Joan Beringer (/joʊˈɑːn ˌbɛərɪnˈʒeɪ/ yoh-AHN BAIR-in-ZHAY, French: [jɔan beʁɛ̃ʒe]; born 11 November 2006) is a French professional basketball player for the Minnesota Timberwolves of the National Basketball Association (NBA).

== Early life ==
Beringer was born on 11 November 2006, in Sélestat, France. His father is Alsatian and his mother is from Benin. He spent the first 10 years of his life in Sélestat before moving to Strasbourg. He played football growing up, and by the summer of 2021 had "never even touched a basketball." However, he said that "At around 14–15 years old, I couldn't find cleats in my size, my feet were too big." After being pressured by friends, he tried out basketball for the first time and enjoyed the sport. He later joined the club Strasbourg Saint-Joseph Basket and played for the U17 team.

Beringer joined SIG Strasbourg in 2022 and played for their U18 squad in the LNB Espoirs league, averaging 4.1 points in the 2022–23 season, then 17.4 points in 2023–24. He also played for the U21 prospects team and averaged 9.4 points, eight rebounds, and 1.5 assists per game.

== Professional career ==
=== Cedevita Olimpija (2024–2025) ===
Beringer moved to Ljubljana in the summer of 2024 to join the club Cedevita Olimpija. He was initially set to play for the club's reserve squad, but impressed and was promoted to the senior team before having appeared in a game. In November 2024, he signed a four-year contract with Cedevita. He saw significant playing time and helped them win the Slovenian Basketball Cup for the 2024–25 season.

=== Minnesota Timberwolves (2025–present) ===
Beringer was selected 17th in the 2025 NBA draft by the Minnesota Timberwolves. He debuted for the Timberwolves in the 2025 NBA Summer League. On 12 April 2026, Beringer put up a double-double with a career-high 24 points and a career-high 12 rebounds, along with a career-high seven blocks.

== National team career ==
Beringer competed for France at the 2023 FIBA U18 European Championship.

== Career statistics ==
Legend
GP	Games played	GS	Games started	MPG	Minutes per game
FG%	Field goal percentage	3P%	3-point field goal percentage	FT%	Free throw percentage
RPG	Rebounds per game	APG	Assists per game	SPG	Steals per game
BPG	Blocks per game	PPG	Points per game	**Bold**	Career high

=== NBA ===
==== Regular season ====
Year	Team	GP	GS	MPG	FG%	3P%	FT%	RPG	APG	SPG	BPG	PPG
2025–26	Minnesota	40	3	7.9	.663	—	.703	2.3	.3	.2	.7	3.9
Career		40	3	7.9	.663	—	.703	2.3	.3	.2	.7	3.9

==== Playoffs ====
Year	Team	GP	GS	MPG	FG%	3P%	FT%	RPG	APG	SPG	BPG	PPG
2026	Minnesota	5	0	4.6	.556	—	.750	2.2	.0	.4	.4	3.2
Career		5	0	4.6	.556	—	.750	2.2	.0	.4	.4	3.2
