= Rob Dillingham =

American basketball player (born 2005)

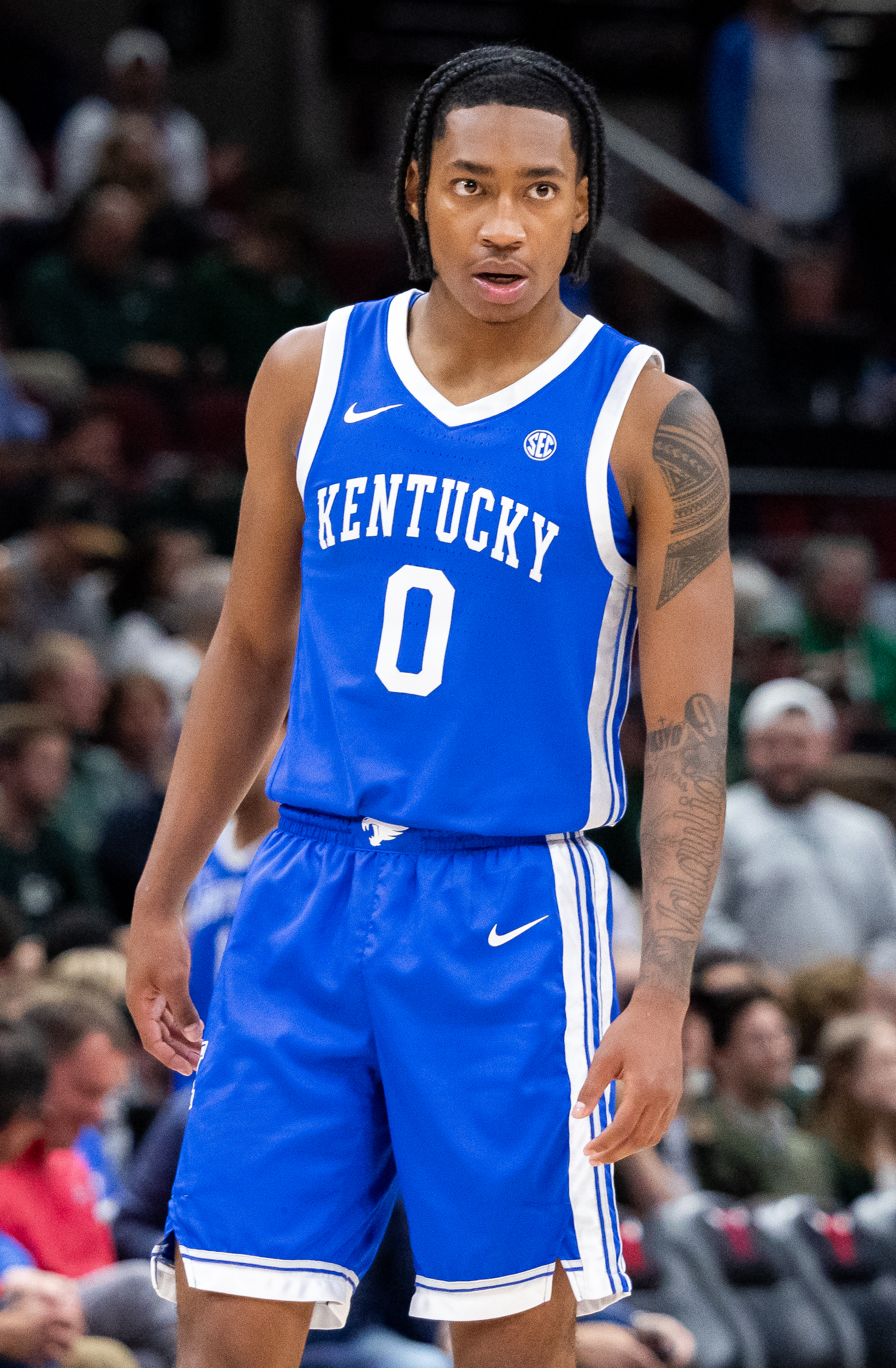
- Dillingham with Kentucky in 2023

No. 00 – Westchester Knicks
- Position: Point guard / shooting guard
- League: NBA G League

Personal information
- Born: January 4, 2005 (age 21) Hickory, North Carolina, U.S.
- Listed height: 6 ft 2 in (1.88 m)
- Listed weight: 175 lb (79 kg)

Career information
- High school: Combine Academy (Lincolnton, North Carolina); Donda Academy (Simi Valley, California); Overtime Elite (Atlanta, Georgia)
- College: Kentucky (2023–2024)
- NBA draft: 2024: 1st round, 8th overall pick
- Drafted by: San Antonio Spurs
- Playing career: 2024–present

Career history
- 2022–2023: Cold Hearts
- 2024–2026: Minnesota Timberwolves
- 2025: →Iowa Wolves
- 2026: Chicago Bulls
- 2026–present: Westchester Knicks

Career highlights
- Second-team All-SEC (2024); SEC Sixth Man of the Year (2024); SEC All-Freshman Team (2024); FIBA Americas Under-16 Championship MVP (2021)
- Stats at NBA.com
- Stats at Basketball Reference
Medals
Men's basketball
Representing the United States
FIBA Americas Under-16 Championship
Gold medal – first place	2021 Mexico	Team

Robert Deon Potasi Dillingham (born January 4, 2005) is an American professional basketball player for the Westchester Knicks of the NBA G League. He played college basketball for the Kentucky Wildcats. Dillingham was a five-star recruit who previously played professionally for the Cold Hearts and Blue Checks with Karter Knox in Overtime Elite during what would have been his senior year in high school. He became a guard for Kentucky during the 2023–24 season. Dillingham was selected in the 2024 NBA draft with the 8th overall pick by the San Antonio Spurs, but was immediately traded to the Minnesota Timberwolves on draft night. After nearly two seasons in Minnesota, he was traded to the Chicago Bulls in 2026.

== Early life and high school career ==
Dillingham was born and raised in Hickory, North Carolina. His father Donald is African American and mother Valaaulia "Lia" Tailele is originally from Samoa. Rob played basketball for Combine Academy in Lincolnton, North Carolina. Dillingham emerged as one of the top players in his class by his sophomore season. As a sophomore, he averaged 21.2 points, 4.9 assists, 4.1 rebounds and 2.1 steals per game, leading his team to a 29–3 record and a non-association state title. He was named Charlotte Observer Player of the Year. For his junior year, he transferred to Donda Academy, Kanye West's school in Simi Valley, California. For his senior year, he transferred to Overtime Elite in Atlanta, Georgia.

=== Recruiting ===
Dillingham was considered a five-star recruit by ESPN and Rivals, and a four-star recruit by 247Sports. On December 1, 2021, he committed to playing college basketball for NC State over offers from Memphis, LSU, Kansas and Kentucky. He became the second-highest-ranked recruit in program history, behind Dennis Smith Jr. On March 19, 2022, Dillingham announced his decommitment from NC State and reopened his recruitment. On June 24, 2022, Dillingham committed to Kentucky over offers from Louisville, Auburn and USC. He became Kentucky's second commit in the 2023 recruiting class. and went on to average 15.2 points per game.

College recruiting
Name	Hometown	School	Height	Weight	Commit date
Rob Dillingham; PG	Hickory, NC	Donda Academy (CA)	6 ft 1 in (1.85 m)	170 lb (77 kg)	Jun 24, 2022
Rob Dillingham; PG	Recruit ratings: Rivals: 247Sports: ESPN: (91)				
Overall recruit ranking: Rivals: 15 247Sports: 21 ESPN: 15
Note: In many cases, Scout, Rivals, 247Sports, On3, and ESPN may conflict in their listings of height and weight.; In these cases, the average was taken. ESPN grades are on a 100-point scale.; Sources: "Kentucky 2023 Basketball Commitments". Rivals.; "2023 Kentucky Wildcats Recruiting Class". ESPN.; "2023 Team Ranking". Rivals.

== Overtime Elite and college career ==
On November 3, 2022, Dillingham left Donda Academy after multiple controversies surrounding its founder, Kanye West, and signed with Overtime Elite, a professional basketball league for late-high-school- and early-college-level players. He joined the Overtime Cold Hearts, one of the six teams in the league. Dillingham made his OTE debut for the Cold Hearts on November 11, recording six points, three rebounds and three steals in a 92–84 loss to the YNG Dreamerz.

After spending one season with the University of Kentucky, Dillingham declared his entry into the 2024 NBA draft and received a green room invite.

== Professional career ==
=== Minnesota Timberwolves (2024–2026) ===
On June 26, 2024, Dillingham was selected with the eighth overall pick by the San Antonio Spurs in the 2024 NBA draft; however, immediately on draft night, he was traded to the Minnesota Timberwolves in exchange for a 2030 protected first-round pick swap and an unprotected first-round pick in 2031. On July 8, he signed with the Timberwolves. On January 12, 2025, Dillingham was assigned to the Iowa Wolves. Dillingham had 49 appearances (including one start) for the Timberwolves during the 2024–25 NBA season, recording averages of 4.5 points, 1.0 rebounds and 2.0 assists.

Dillingham made 35 appearances for Minnesota in the 2025–26 NBA season, averaging 3.5 points, 1.2 rebounds and 1.7 assists.

=== Chicago Bulls (2026) ===
On February 5, 2026, Dillingham, Leonard Miller and four second-round picks were traded to the Chicago Bulls in exchange for Ayo Dosunmu and Julian Philips. On February 7, Dillingham made his Bulls debut. He scored nine points, tallied three rebounds, four assists and one steal in 22 minutes of playtime against the Denver Nuggets. He made 30 appearances for Chicago, recording averages of 9.6 points, 3.0 rebounds and 2.8 assists. On April 22, Dillingham underwent surgery to remove a ganglion cyst from his right wrist.

On September 27, 2026, Dillingham was traded to the Charlotte Hornets in exchange for Buddy Hield, but was released on September 28.

== National team career ==
Dillingham led the United States to a gold medal at the 2021 FIBA Under-16 Americas Championship in Mexico. He was named most valuable player after averaging 15.7 points, 6.2 assists and 3.2 steals per game. He posted a team-record 31 points, six rebounds, four assists and three steals in a 90–75 win against Argentina in the final.

== Personal life ==
Dillingham is the son of Valaaulia Tailele and Donald Dillingham. He has two siblings, Pai Tailele and Denzel Dillingham.

== Career statistics ==
Legend
GP	Games played	GS	Games started	MPG	Minutes per game
FG%	Field goal percentage	3P%	3-point field goal percentage	FT%	Free throw percentage
RPG	Rebounds per game	APG	Assists per game	SPG	Steals per game
BPG	Blocks per game	PPG	Points per game	**Bold**	Career high

=== NBA ===
==== Regular season ====
Year	Team	GP	GS	MPG	FG%	3P%	FT%	RPG	APG	SPG	BPG	PPG
2024–25	Minnesota	**49**	**1**	10.5	**.441**	.338	.533	1.0	2.0	.4	.0	4.5
2025–26	Minnesota	35	0	9.3	.333	**.364**	**.750**	1.2	1.7	.5	**.1**	3.5
2025–26	Chicago	30	0	**21.5**	.428	.300	.743	**3.0**	**2.8**	**.9**	**.1**	**9.6**
Career		114	1	13.0	.411	.324	.700	1.6	2.1	.6	.1	5.5

==== Playoffs ====
Year	Team	GP	GS	MPG	FG%	3P%	FT%	RPG	APG	SPG	BPG	PPG
2025	Minnesota	3	0	5.3	.375	.500	.500	.7	2.3	.0	.0	2.7
Career		3	0	5.3	.375	.500	.500	.7	2.3	.0	.0	2.7

=== College ===
Year	Team	GP	GS	MPG	FG%	3P%	FT%	RPG	APG	SPG	BPG	PPG
2023–24	Kentucky	32	1	23.3	.475	.444	.796	2.9	3.9	1.0	.1	15.2
