= Donda Academy =

Private school in California, United States

Location
- 1625 Tierra Rejada Road; Simi Valley, California 93065; United States; 34°16′16″N 118°49′51″W

Information
- Type: Private school
- Motto: To be a reflection of God's glory in the world
- Founded: c. 2020
- Founder: Kanye West
- Principal: Moira Love
- Grades: PK–12
- Student to teacher ratio: 10:1
- Color: Grey
- Mascot: Doves
- Team name: Donda Doves
- Tuition: $15,000

Donda Academy was an unaccredited Christian private school for pre-kindergarten through twelfth grade, located in Simi Valley, California, United States. It was founded in 2020 by American rapper Kanye West.

During the admissions and hiring process, parents, faculty and staff were required to comply with the following stipulations: a non-disclosure agreement had to be signed, the school's location had to be kept secret and all members of the school community had to refrain from publicly discussing the school's existence, practices and any other non-public details. All students, faculty and staff were required to adhere to the school dress code of black Balenciaga uniforms designed by West.

On October 27, 2022, it was reported that the school had closed abruptly after West made antisemitic comments in interviews and on social media. It was reopened hours later. Donda Academy is listed as closed by the California Department of Education with an official closure date of June 30, 2024.

== History ==
The school was founded in late 2020 in Calabasas, as a private Christian academy. In September 2022, West revealed that the school would be named Donda Academy after his late mother Donda West. It was located in Simi Valley at the former site of the Simi Valley Stoneridge Preparatory School. Rolling Stone was told that parents are required to sign a non-disclosure agreement to register their children. The founding executive director was Brianne Campbell, a Masters student at Pepperdine University, who later resigned because of Kanye West's antisemitic statements. A 2023 lawsuit stated that the principal is Moira Love. The school enrolled about 100 students and employed 16 teachers, with a number of celebrities' children in attendance. West's four children with Kim Kardashian did not attend the school; they attended Sierra Canyon School in Los Angeles.

In October 2022, Tamar Andrews, a Jewish educator who worked at the academy, resigned after West's antisemitic comments.

On October 27, 2022, the school notified parents that it had canceled the remainder of the 2022–23 school year and would reopen at the beginning of the 2023–24 school year. Hours later, the school notified parents that the school would reopen on October 28, 2022. On the same day, singer Keyshia Cole pulled her son out of the school. When a fan asked on Twitter if she had signed an NDA, Cole responded, "And there was no NDA signed. Idk who may have but that wasn't brought up to us."

Two former teachers filed a lawsuit against the school in April 2023, alleging that they were unjustly fired without any reason after complaining of health and safety violations. The teachers allege that the academy had unusual rules and requirements. Crossword puzzles, coloring sheets, utensils, and chairs were disallowed. Students could not wear jewelry and clothing made by Nike and Adidas. No color or artwork was allowed in classrooms, and all cups and bowls were required to be gray. West did not allow classes on the second floor of the school building because of a fear of stairs. Students were only allowed to eat sushi on the floor, as the school did not have tables; outside food was disallowed. There were no janitorial services and no school nurse; West banned the use of cleaning chemicals and trash cans, and one student's EpiPen was stored above a microwave.

== Academics ==
The school curriculum includes Christianity, language arts, mathematics, and science. It also includes enrichment courses, such as world languages, the visual arts, film, choir, and parkour. The school has a 10:1 ratio of students to teachers, and no class exceeds 12 students.

The school had not sought accreditation by the private Western Association of Schools and Colleges, as private schools in California are not required to be accredited or licensed, though they do have to register with the state.

== Basketball team ==
Donda Doves logo

The school's basketball team was the Donda Doves. The team was featured on the January 2022 cover of Slam, a basketball-focused publication. In order of appearance, the players who appeared on the cover along with West were Bryce Baker, Brandon White, Jalen Hooks, Chuck Bailey III, Javonte "JJ" Taylor, Jahki Howard, Robert Dillingham, Seven Bahati, Braeden Moore, Omarion Bodrick, and Zion Cruz.

Their inaugural game was held in February 2022 at the Credit Union 1 Arena, playing against Chicago Prep. The Doves won the game, 85–62.

The team was scheduled to appear at the Hoophall Classic and Kentucky Play-By-Play Classic showcases in 2022, but the invitations were rescinded in late October. ESPN rated player Robert Dillingham number 8 on their ESPN 100 list; speculation surrounding Dillingham continuing with the team began in late October after West's antisemitic remarks, the abrupt school closure and reopening, and the showcases being rescinded resulted in a fallout for the school. Dillingham later left Donda Academy to play for the Cold Hearts team in the Overtime Elite.

After the showcase invitations were canceled, players JJ Taylor (small forward) and Chuck Bailey III (reserve guard) left the school, with Taylor transferring to San Ysidro High School.

== Notable alumni ==
- Rob Dillingham, basketball player currently with the Charlotte Hornets.
- AJ Johnson, basketball player currently with the Memphis Grizzlies.
