= Leonard Miller (basketball) =

Canadian basketball player (born 2003)

No. 11 – Chicago Bulls
- Position: Power forward
- League: NBA

Personal information
- Born: November 26, 2003 (age 22) Scarborough, Ontario, Canada
- Listed height: 6 ft 10 in (2.08 m)
- Listed weight: 220 lb (100 kg)

Career information
- High school: Bill Crothers Secondary School (Markham, Ontario): Thornlea Secondary School (Thornhill, Ontario); Wasatch Academy (Mount Pleasant, Utah); Victory Rock Prep (Bradenton, Florida); Fort Erie International Academy (Fort Erie, Ontario)
- NBA draft: 2023: 2nd round, 33rd overall pick
- Drafted by: San Antonio Spurs
- Playing career: 2022–present

Career history
- 2022–2023: NBA G League Ignite
- 2023–2026: Minnesota Timberwolves
- 2023–2024: →Iowa Wolves
- 2026–present: Chicago Bulls
- 2026: →Windy City Bulls

Career highlights
- NBA G League Next Up Game (2023)
- Stats at NBA.com
- Stats at Basketball Reference
Medals
Men's basketball
Representing Canada
FIBA Americas Under-16 Championship
| Silver medal – second place | 2019 Brazil | Team |

Leonard Miller (born November 26, 2003) is a Canadian professional basketball player for the Chicago Bulls of the National Basketball Association (NBA). He previously played for the NBA G League Ignite.

== Early life and high school career ==
Leonard Miller was born in Scarborough, Ontario, and played basketball, volleyball and golf during his childhood. He played basketball for Bill Crothers Secondary School in Markham, Ontario, for grade 9 from 2017 to 2018 and transferred to Thornlea Secondary School in Thornhill, Ontario, for grade 10, where he helped the team win the National Junior Circuit title in March 2019. Miller transferred to Wasatch Academy in Mount Pleasant, Utah, to face stronger competition but received limiting playing time. He transferred to Victory Rock Prep in Bradenton, Florida, before missing several months with a broken right wrist in November 2020 that required surgery. Miller opted to play a postgraduate season at Fort Erie International Academy in Fort Erie, Ontario after growing 6' 4" guard to 6' 10" guard/wing over an 18-month period, and had no college offers at the time he made the decision. He became the team's star player and received over 25 offers from college programs. Miller led Fort Erie to an Ontario Scholastic Basketball Association title and was named league most valuable player. He was selected to play for the World Team in the Nike Hoop Summit. On April 23, 2022, he declared for the 2022 NBA draft. On June 13, 2022, he withdrew from the draft and decided to play with the NBA G League Ignite for the next season.

=== Recruiting ===
Miller was considered a five-star recruit by Rivals and was ranked as the 2nd ranked prospect by On3.com despite playing in Canada with On3 ranking him first with the highest upside in the recruiting class. On May 31, 2022, he announced that he would pursue professional options instead of playing college basketball.

== Professional career ==
=== NBA G League Ignite (2022–2023) ===
On September 7, 2022, Miller signed a contract with the NBA G League Ignite. He was named to the G League's inaugural Next Up Game for the 2022–23 season.

=== Minnesota Timberwolves (2023–2026) ===
Miller was drafted in the second round of the 2023 NBA draft with the 33rd overall pick by the San Antonio Spurs. He was then traded to the Minnesota Timberwolves on draft night. He made his summer league debut in Las Vegas on July 7, 2023. The Timberwolves announced they had signed Miller to a contract on July 9 of that year. Miller made 17 appearances for Minnesota during his rookie campaign, posting averages of 1.7 points, 1.2 rebounds, and 0.5 assists.

Miller played in 13 games for the Timberwolves during the 2024–25 NBA season, averaging 1.5 points and 0.8 rebounds. Throughout his rookie and sophomore seasons, he was assigned several times to the Iowa Wolves. Miller made 19 appearances for Minnesota in the 2025–26 NBA season, logging averages of 2.3 points, 1.3 rebounds, and 0.3 assists.

=== Chicago Bulls (2026–present) ===
On February 5, 2026, Miller, Rob Dillingham, and four second-round picks were traded to the Chicago Bulls in exchange for Ayo Dosunmu and Julian Philips.

== National team career ==
Miller won a silver medal with Canada at the 2019 FIBA Under-16 Americas Championship in Brazil, averaging 4.2 points per game.

== Career statistics ==
Legend
| GP | Games played | GS | Games started | MPG | Minutes per game |
| FG% | Field goal percentage | 3P% | 3-point field goal percentage | FT% | Free throw percentage |
| RPG | Rebounds per game | APG | Assists per game | SPG | Steals per game |
| BPG | Blocks per game | PPG | Points per game | **Bold** | Career high |

=== NBA ===
==== Regular season ====
| Year | Team | GP | GS | MPG | FG% | 3P% | FT% | RPG | APG | SPG | BPG | PPG |
|---|---|---|---|---|---|---|---|---|---|---|---|---|
| 2023–24 | Minnesota | 17 | 0 | 3.1 | **.650** | **.400** | .500 | 1.2 | .5 | .1 | .1 | 1.7 |
| 2024–25 | Minnesota | 13 | 0 | 2.5 | .400 | .000 | **1.000** | .8 | .0 | .2 | .1 | 1.5 |
| 2025–26 | Minnesota | 19 | 0 | 5.0 | .545 | .083 | .636 | 1.3 | .3 | .2 | .0 | 2.3 |
| 2025–26 | Chicago | **27** | **12** | **23.1** | .555 | .356 | .762 | **5.8** | **1.3** | **.5** | **.6** | **11.7** |
| Career | | 76 | 12 | 10.6 | .552 | .312 | .762 | 2.8 | .6 | .3 | .2 | 5.4 |

==== Playoffs ====
| Year | Team | GP | GS | MPG | FG% | 3P% | FT% | RPG | APG | SPG | BPG | PPG |
|---|---|---|---|---|---|---|---|---|---|---|---|---|
| 2024 | Minnesota | **3** | 0 | 2.3 | .000 | .000 | — | 1.3 | .0 | .0 | .0 | .0 |
| 2025 | Minnesota | **3** | 0 | **4.3** | **.750** | **1.000** | — | **1.7** | .0 | .0 | .0 | **4.3** |
| Career | | 6 | 0 | 3.3 | .667 | .500 | — | 1.5 | .0 | .0 | .0 | 2.2 |

=== NBA G League ===
| Year | Team | GP | GS | MPG | FG% | 3P% | FT% | RPG | APG | SPG | BPG | PPG |
|---|---|---|---|---|---|---|---|---|---|---|---|---|
| 2022–23 | NBA G League | **14** | **11** | **28.1** | .500 | .275 | .793 | **8.6** | 1.6 | **1.2** | .6 | 15.1 |
| 2023–24 | Iowa | 12 | **11** | 26.7 | **.528** | **.327** | **.933** | 6.4 | **1.9** | .8 | **.9** | **16.2** |
| Career | | 26 | 22 | 27.4 | .513 | .305 | .841 | 7.6 | 1.7 | 1.0 | .8 | 15.6 |

== Personal life ==
Miller's older brother, Emanuel, played college basketball for Texas A&M and TCU and currently plays on a two-way contract for the San Antonio Spurs.
