= 2025–26 Minnesota Timberwolves season =

2025–26 NBA season by team

- Head coach: Chris Finch
- President: Tim Connelly
- General manager: Tim Connelly
- Owner(s): Alex Rodriguez & Marc Lore
- Arena: Target Center

Results
- Record: 49–33 (.598)
- Place: Division: 3rd (Northwest); Conference: 6th (Western)
- Playoff finish: Conference semifinals (lost to Spurs 2–4)
- Stats at Basketball Reference

Local media
- Television: FanDuel Sports Network North; KARE/North Star Sports & Entertainment Network (4 simulcasts, 3 on NSEN)
- Radio: KFXN

The 2025–26 Minnesota Timberwolves season was the 37th season for the franchise in the National Basketball Association (NBA). The season also marked the first under the ownership of Marc Lore and former Major League Baseball player Alex Rodriguez, following ownership disputes involving former owner Glen Taylor. The NBA unanimously approved the ownership transfer on June 24, 2025.

On April 7, 2026, the Timberwolves clinched the playoffs for the fifth consecutive season following their win against the Indiana Pacers. They finished the season 49–33 and placed sixth in the Western Conference for the second straight time. In the playoffs, they faced the third seed Denver Nuggets in the first round; despite losing Anthony Edwards and Donte DiVincenzo to injuries, they ended up upsetting the Nuggets in six games. However, their season came into an end when they were eliminated in the conference semifinals by the San Antonio Spurs in six games.

== Draft ==
Round	Pick	Player	Position(s)	Nationality	College / Club
1	17	Joan Beringer	Center	France	Cedevita Olimpija (Slovenia)
2	31	Rasheer Fleming	Power Forward	United States	Saint Joseph's

The Timberwolves entered the draft with one first-round pick and one second-round pick, both acquired through previous trades. The first-round pick is originally owned by the Detroit Pistons and was eventually conveyed to Minnesota when Detroit clinched a 2025 playoff berth and thus lost its Top 13 protection, having previously rolled over from 2021 to 2024 as Detroit missed the playoffs during those years. Meanwhile, the second-round pick is unprotected and acquired from the Utah Jazz as part of the three-team trade in 2023 involving Mike Conley. The Timberwolves have traded their original first- and second-round selections to Utah (as part of the Rudy Gobert trade in 2022) and Houston Rockets (eventually used by the Los Angeles Clippers), respectively.

== Roster ==
2025–26 Minnesota Timberwolves roster
Players

Pos.	No.	Player	Height	Weight	DOB	From
F	12	Kyle Anderson	6 ft 8 in (2.03 m)	230 lb (104 kg)	1993-09-20	UCLA
C	19	Joan Beringer	6 ft 11 in (2.11 m)	230 lb (104 kg)	2006-11-11	France
G	22	Jaylen Clark	6 ft 5 in (1.96 m)	205 lb (93 kg)	2001-10-13	UCLA
G	10	Mike Conley Jr.	6 ft 1 in (1.85 m)	175 lb (79 kg)	1987-10-11	Ohio State
G	0	Donte DiVincenzo	6 ft 4 in (1.93 m)	203 lb (92 kg)	1997-01-31	Villanova
G	13	Ayo Dosunmu	6 ft 4 in (1.93 m)	200 lb (91 kg)	2000-01-17	Illinois
G	5	Anthony Edwards	6 ft 4 in (1.93 m)	225 lb (102 kg)	2001-08-05	Georgia
F	25	Enrique Freeman (TW)	6 ft 9 in (2.06 m)	220 lb (100 kg)	2000-07-29	Akron
C	27	Rudy Gobert	7 ft 1 in (2.16 m)	258 lb (117 kg)	1992-06-26	France
G	8	Bones Hyland	6 ft 2 in (1.88 m)	169 lb (77 kg)	2000-09-14	VCU
F	7	Joe Ingles	6 ft 8 in (2.03 m)	220 lb (100 kg)	1987-10-02	Australia
F	3	Jaden McDaniels	6 ft 9 in (2.06 m)	185 lb (84 kg)	2000-09-29	Washington
F	4	Julian Phillips	6 ft 6 in (1.98 m)	201 lb (91 kg)	2003-11-05	Tennessee
G	15	Zyon Pullin (TW)	6 ft 4 in (1.93 m)	206 lb (93 kg)	2001-03-03	Florida
F	30	Julius Randle	6 ft 9 in (2.06 m)	250 lb (113 kg)	1994-11-29	Kentucky
F/C	11	Naz Reid	6 ft 9 in (2.06 m)	264 lb (120 kg)	1999-08-26	LSU
G/F	1	Terrence Shannon Jr.	6 ft 6 in (1.98 m)	215 lb (98 kg)	2000-07-30	Illinois
C	44	Rocco Zikarsky (TW)	7 ft 3 in (2.21 m)	227 lb (103 kg)	2006-07-11	Australia

Coaches
Head coach
- Chris Finch
Assistant(s)
- Nathan Bubes
- Moses Ehambe
- Kevin Hanson
- Chris Hines
- Max Lefevre
- Jeff Newton
- Micah Nori
- Pablo Prigioni
- Elston Turner
- Corliss Williamson

Legend
- (DP) Unsigned draft pick
- (FA) Free agent
- (S) Suspended
- (GL) On assignment to G League affiliate
- (TW) Two-way affiliate player
- Injured

Roster
Updated: March 3, 2026

== Standings ==
=== Division ===
Northwest Division	W	L	PCT	GB	Home	Road	Div	GP
z – Oklahoma City Thunder	64	18	.780	–	34‍–‍8	30‍–‍10	12‍–‍4	82
x – Denver Nuggets	54	28	.659	10.0	28‍–‍13	26‍–‍15	11‍–‍5	82
x – Minnesota Timberwolves	49	33	.598	15.0	26‍–‍15	23‍–‍18	9‍–‍7	82
x – Portland Trail Blazers	42	40	.512	22.0	24‍–‍17	18‍–‍23	7‍–‍9	82
Utah Jazz	22	60	.268	42.0	14‍–‍27	8‍–‍33	1‍–‍15	82

=== Conference ===
Western Conference
#	Team	W	L	PCT	GB	GP
1	z – Oklahoma City Thunder *	64	18	.780	–	82
2	y – San Antonio Spurs *	62	20	.756	2.0	82
3	x – Denver Nuggets	54	28	.659	10.0	82
4	y – Los Angeles Lakers *	53	29	.646	11.0	82
5	x – Houston Rockets	52	30	.634	12.0	82
6	x – Minnesota Timberwolves	49	33	.598	15.0	82
7	x – Phoenix Suns	45	37	.549	19.0	82
8	x – Portland Trail Blazers	42	40	.512	22.0	82
9	pi – Los Angeles Clippers	42	40	.512	22.0	82
10	pi – Golden State Warriors	37	45	.451	27.0	82
11	New Orleans Pelicans	26	56	.317	38.0	82
12	Dallas Mavericks	26	56	.317	38.0	82
13	Memphis Grizzlies	25	57	.305	39.0	82
14	Sacramento Kings	22	60	.268	42.0	82
15	Utah Jazz	22	60	.268	42.0	82

== Game log ==
=== Preseason ===
2025 preseason game log
Total: 2–4 (Home: 1–1; Road: 1–3)
Preseason: 2–4 (home: 1–1; road: 1–3)

Game	Date	Team	Score	High points	High rebounds	High assists	Location Attendance	Record
1	October 4	@ Denver	W 126–116	Bones Hyland (18)	Rocco Zikarsky (8)	Rob Dillingham (9)	Pechanga Arena; 12,096	1–0
2	October 7	Indiana	L 134–135 (OT)	Johnny Juzang (20)	Alize Johnson (9)	Terrence Shannon Jr. (5)	Target Center; 0	1–1
3	October 9	@ New York	L 95–100 (OT)	Anthony Edwards (17)	Rudy Gobert (11)	Rob Dillingham (5)	Madison Square Garden; 18,344	1–2
4	October 13	Guangzhou	W 134–74	Rob Dillingham (27)	Leonard Miller (11)	Rob Dillingham (9)	Target Center; 8,013	2–2
5	October 16	@ Chicago	L 120–126	Anthony Edwards (25)	Gobert, Randle (8)	Terrence Shannon Jr. (7)	United Center; 17,573	2–3
6	October 17	@ Philadelphia	L 110–126	Leonard Miller (21)	Johnny Juzang (6)	Rob Dillingham (6)	Xfinity Mobile Arena; 17,824	2–4

2025–26 preseason schedule

=== Regular season ===
2025–26 game log
Total: 49–33 (Home: 26–15; Road: 23–18)
October: 2–3 (home: 1–2; road: 1–1)

Game	Date	Team	Score	High points	High rebounds	High assists	Location Attendance	Record
1	October 22	@ Portland	W 118–114	Anthony Edwards (41)	Edwards, Randle (7)	Julius Randle (6)	Moda Center; 19,335	1–0
2	October 24	@ L.A. Lakers	L 110–128	Anthony Edwards (31)	Julius Randle (9)	Julius Randle (6)	Crypto.com Arena; 18,642	1–1
3	October 26	Indiana	W 114–110	Julius Randle (31)	Rudy Gobert (19)	Julius Randle (6)	Target Center; 18,978	2–1
4	October 27	Denver	L 114–127	Jaden McDaniels (25)	Randle, Reid (7)	Conley Jr., DiVincenzo (4)	Target Center; 14,018	2–2
5	October 29	L.A. Lakers	L 115–116	Julius Randle (33)	Jaden McDaniels (7)	Conley Jr., DiVincenzo, Randle (6)	Target Center; 15,308	2–3

November: 10–5 (home: 6–1; road: 4–4)

Game	Date	Team	Score	High points	High rebounds	High assists	Location Attendance	Record
6	November 1	@ Charlotte	W 122–105	Julius Randle (30)	Rudy Gobert (15)	Conley, McDaniels (6)	Spectrum Center; 19,444	3–3
7	November 3	@ Brooklyn	W 125–109	Donte DiVincenzo (25)	Rudy Gobert (12)	Julius Randle (10)	Barclays Center; 17,287	4–3
8	November 5	@ New York	L 114–137	Julius Randle (32)	Rudy Gobert (9)	Mike Conley (6)	Madison Square Garden; 19,812	4–4
9	November 7	Utah	W 137–97	Anthony Edwards (37)	Julius Randle (10)	Julius Randle (12)	Target Center; 17,924	5–4
10	November 9	@ Sacramento	W 144–117	Anthony Edwards (26)	Rudy Gobert (12)	Anthony Edwards (5)	Golden 1 Center; 15,227	6–4
11	November 10	@ Utah	W 120–113	Anthony Edwards (35)	Rudy Gobert (12)	Julius Randle (7)	Delta Center; 18,186	7–4
12	November 14	Sacramento	W 124–110	Anthony Edwards (30)	Naz Reid (12)	DiVincenzo, Randle (5)	Target Center; 16,962	8–4
13	November 15	Denver	L 112–123	Julius Randle (20)	Rudy Gobert (6)	Anthony Edwards (6)	Target Center	8–5
14	November 17	Dallas	W 120–96	Naz Reid (22)	Naz Reid (12)	Gobert, Randle (4)	Target Center; 16,712	9–5
15	November 19	Washington	W 120–109	Julius Randle (32)	Rudy Gobert (15)	Conley, DiVincenzo, Randle (6)	Target Center; 16,578	10–5
16	November 21	@ Phoenix	L 112–113	Anthony Edwards (41)	Rudy Gobert (12)	Edwards, Gobert (4)	Mortgage Matchup Center; 17,071	10–6
17	November 24	@ Sacramento	L 112–117 (OT)	Anthony Edwards (43)	Rudy Gobert (13)	Conley, Randle (5)	Golden 1 Center; 16,957	10–7
18	November 26	@ Oklahoma City	L 105–113	Anthony Edwards (31)	Rudy Gobert (12)	Anthony Edwards (5)	Paycom Center; 18,203	10–8
19	November 29	Boston	W 119–115	Anthony Edwards (39)	Julius Randle (9)	Donte DiVincenzo (8)	Target Center; 17,344	11–8
20	November 30	San Antonio	W 125–112	Anthony Edwards (32)	Rudy Gobert (8)	Julius Randle (12)	Target Center; 16,979	12–8

December: 9–5 (home: 5–3; road: 4–2)

Game	Date	Team	Score	High points	High rebounds	High assists	Location Attendance	Record
21	December 2	@ New Orleans	W 149–142 (OT)	Anthony Edwards (42)	Rudy Gobert (13)	Randle, Reid (6)	Smoothie King Center; 12,770	13–8
22	December 4	@ New Orleans	W 125–116	Julius Randle (28)	Rudy Gobert (12)	Naz Reid (6)	Smoothie King Center; 16,459	14–8
23	December 6	L.A. Clippers	W 109–106	Jaden McDaniels (27)	Naz Reid (9)	Julius Randle (6)	Target Center; 17,506	15–8
24	December 8	Phoenix	L 105–108	Anthony Edwards (40)	Edwards, Reid (9)	Julius Randle (8)	Target Center; 16,046	15–9
25	December 12	@ Golden State	W 127–120	Julius Randle (27)	Rudy Gobert (14)	Naz Reid (7)	Chase Center; 18,064	16–9
26	December 14	Sacramento	W 117–103	Julius Randle (24)	Rudy Gobert (12)	Donte DiVincenzo (6)	Target Center; 15,466	17–9
27	December 17	Memphis	L 110–116	Julius Randle (21)	Rudy Gobert (16)	Jaden McDaniels (6)	Target Center; 16,287	17–10
28	December 19	Oklahoma City	W 112–107	Anthony Edwards (26)	Rudy Gobert (14)	Julius Randle (5)	Target Center; 18,978	18–10
29	December 21	Milwaukee	W 103–100	Anthony Edwards (24)	Rudy Gobert (14)	Conley Jr., Edwards (6)	Target Center; 18,978	19–10
30	December 23	New York	W 115–104	Anthony Edwards (38)	Rudy Gobert (16)	Donte DiVincenzo (8)	Target Center; 18,978	20–10
31	December 25	@ Denver	L 138–142 (OT)	Anthony Edwards (44)	Rudy Gobert (12)	Donte DiVincenzo (8)	Ball Arena; 20,046	20–11
32	December 27	Brooklyn	L 107–123	Anthony Edwards (28)	Rudy Gobert (8)	Julius Randle (11)	Target Center; 18,978	20–12
33	December 29	@ Chicago	W 136–101	Naz Reid (33)	Rudy Gobert (10)	Julius Randle (14)	United Center; 21,429	21–12
34	December 31	@ Atlanta	L 102–126	Anthony Edwards (30)	Rudy Gobert (11)	Donte DiVincenzo (7)	State Farm Arena; 16,345	21–13

January: 10–6 (home: 5–2; road: 5–4)

Game	Date	Team	Score	High points	High rebounds	High assists	Location Attendance	Record
35	January 3	@ Miami	W 125–115	Anthony Edwards (33)	Rudy Gobert (12)	Anthony Edwards (5)	Kaseya Center; 19,893	22–13
36	January 4	@ Washington	W 141–115	Anthony Edwards (35)	Rudy Gobert (14)	Hyland, McDaniels (5)	Capital One Arena; 16,728	23–13
37	January 6	Miami	W 122–94	Anthony Edwards (26)	Rudy Gobert (16)	Hyland, Randle (5)	Target Center; 17,023	24–13
38	January 8	Cleveland	W 131–122	Julius Randle (28)	Rudy Gobert (13)	Anthony Edwards (9)	Target Center; 17,274	25–13
39	January 10	@ Cleveland	L 134–146	Edwards, Reid (25)	Rudy Gobert (12)	Bones Hyland (7)	Rocket Arena; 19,432	25–14
40	January 11	San Antonio	W 104–103	Anthony Edwards (23)	Rudy Gobert (14)	Donte DiVincenzo (7)	Target Center; 18,978	26–14
41	January 13	@ Milwaukee	W 139–106	Julius Randle (29)	Julius Randle (8)	Donte DiVincenzo (7)	Fiserv Forum; 17,341	27–14
42	January 16	@ Houston	L 105–110	Julius Randle (39)	Rudy Gobert (13)	Bones Hyland (5)	Toyota Center; 18,055	27–15
43	January 17	@ San Antonio	L 123–126	Anthony Edwards (55)	Julius Randle (10)	Jaden McDaniels (5)	Frost Bank Center; 18,527	27–16
44	January 20	@ Utah	L 122–127	Anthony Edwards (38)	Rudy Gobert (10)	Donte DiVincenzo (8)	Delta Center; 18,186	27–17
45	January 22	Chicago	L 115–120	Julius Randle (30)	Rudy Gobert (11)	Julius Randle (6)	Target Center; 17,463	27–18
—	January 24	Golden State	Postponed due to the killing of Alex Pretti in Minneapolis. Makeup date January 25.					
46	January 25	Golden State	L 85–111	Anthony Edwards (32)	Anthony Edwards (11)	Julius Randle (6)	Target Center; 18,978	27–19
47	January 26	Golden State	W 108–83	Julius Randle (18)	Rudy Gobert (17)	Donte DiVincenzo (8)	Target Center; 18,978	28–19
48	January 28	@ Dallas	W 118–105	Julius Randle (31)	Naz Reid (8)	Anthony Edwards (6)	American Airlines Center; 18,680	29–19
49	January 29	Oklahoma City	W 123–111	Anthony Edwards (26)	Rudy Gobert (11)	Tied (5)	Target Center; 18,012	30–19
50	January 31	@ Memphis	W 131–114	Anthony Edwards (33)	Rudy Gobert (16)	Julius Randle (7)	FedExForum; 15,372	31–19

February: 6–4 (home: 3–3; road: 3–1)

Game	Date	Team	Score	High points	High rebounds	High assists	Location Attendance	Record
51	February 2	@ Memphis	L 128–137	Anthony Edwards (39)	Rudy Gobert (10)	Julius Randle (8)	FedExForum; 14,005	31–20
52	February 4	@ Toronto	W 128–126	Anthony Edwards (30)	Rudy Gobert (12)	DiVincenzo, Edwards (5)	Scotiabank Arena; 18,775	32–20
53	February 6	New Orleans	L 115–119	Anthony Edwards (35)	Rudy Gobert (16)	Julius Randle (7)	Target Center; 18,978	32–21
54	February 8	L.A. Clippers	L 96–115	Anthony Edwards (23)	Naz Reid (9)	Naz Reid (3)	Target Center; 18,978	32–22
55	February 9	Atlanta	W 138–116	Anthony Edwards (30)	Julius Randle (12)	Julius Randle (10)	Target Center; 17,243	33–22
56	February 11	Portland	W 133–109	Julius Randle (41)	Rudy Gobert (8)	Jaden McDaniels (6)	Target Center; 16,988	34–22
All-Star Game
57	February 20	Dallas	W 122–111	Anthony Edwards (40)	Rudy Gobert (17)	Donte DiVincenzo (9)	Target Center; 18,978	35–22
58	February 22	Philadelphia	L 108–135	Anthony Edwards (28)	Anthony Edwards (9)	Conley, Dosunmu (4)	Target Center; 18,978	35–23
59	February 24	@ Portland	W 124–121	Anthony Edwards (34)	Rudy Gobert (19)	Julius Randle (6)	Moda Center; 17,581	36–23
60	February 26	@ L.A. Clippers	W 94–88	Anthony Edwards (31)	Rudy Gobert (13)	Julius Randle (6)	Intuit Dome; 17,649	37–23

March: 9–6 (home: 5–3; road: 4–3)

Game	Date	Team	Score	High points	High rebounds	High assists	Location Attendance	Record
61	March 1	@ Denver	W 117–108	Anthony Edwards (21)	Rudy Gobert (15)	Julius Randle (7)	Ball Arena; 19,895	38–23
62	March 3	Memphis	W 117–110	Anthony Edwards (41)	Rudy Gobert (12)	Donte DiVincenzo (6)	Target Center; 17,416	39–23
63	March 5	Toronto	W 115–107	Anthony Edwards (22)	Rudy Gobert (12)	Rudy Gobert (5)	Target Center; 18,978	40–23
64	March 7	Orlando	L 92–119	Anthony Edwards (34)	Julius Randle (9)	DiVincenzo, Hyland (4)	Target Center; 18,978	40–24
65	March 10	@ L.A. Lakers	L 106–120	Edwards, Randle (14)	Rudy Gobert (12)	Anthony Edwards (4)	Crypto.com Arena; 18,997	40–25
66	March 11	@ L.A. Clippers	L 129–153	Anthony Edwards (36)	Julius Randle (6)	Anthony Edwards (5)	Intuit Dome; 16,871	40–26
67	March 13	@ Golden State	W 127–117	Anthony Edwards (42)	Rudy Gobert (9)	Ayo Dosunmu (7)	Chase Center; 18,064	41–26
68	March 15	@ Oklahoma City	L 103–116	Julius Randle (32)	Donte DiVincenzo (9)	Julius Randle (6)	Paycom Center; 18,203	41–27
69	March 17	Phoenix	W 116–104	Julius Randle (32)	Rudy Gobert (19)	Kyle Anderson (6)	Target Center; 17,309	42–27
70	March 18	Utah	W 147–111	Ayo Dosunmu (23)	Rudy Gobert (12)	Julius Randle (8)	Target Center; 17,047	43–27
71	March 20	Portland	L 104–108	Julius Randle (19)	Rudy Gobert (15)	Ayo Dosunmu (8)	Target Center; 18,978	43–28
72	March 22	@ Boston	W 102–92	Bones Hyland (23)	Rudy Gobert (14)	Ayo Dosunmu (6)	TD Garden; 19,156	44–28
73	March 25	Houston	W 110–108 (OT)	Jaden McDaniels (25)	Rudy Gobert (14)	Bones Hyland (8)	Target Center; 18,978	45–28
74	March 28	Detroit	L 87–109	Donte DiVincenzo (22)	Rudy Gobert (12)	Mike Conley (6)	Target Center; 18,978	45–29
75	March 30	@ Dallas	W 124–94	Julius Randle (24)	Ayo Dosunmu (15)	Ayo Dosunmu (12)	American Airlines Center; 20,021	46–29

April: 3–4 (home: 1–1; road: 2–3)

Game	Date	Team	Score	High points	High rebounds	High assists	Location Attendance	Record
76	April 2	@ Detroit	L 108–113	Julius Randle (27)	Anderson, Gobert (7)	Julius Randle (6)	Little Caesars Arena; 20,062	46–30
77	April 3	@ Philadelphia	L 103–115	Hyland, Randle (21)	Rudy Gobert (16)	Kyle Anderson (5)	Xfinity Mobile Arena; 18,457	46–31
78	April 5	Charlotte	L 108–122	Julius Randle (26)	Rudy Gobert (10)	Bones Hyland (6)	Target Center; 18,978	46–32
79	April 7	@ Indiana	W 124–104	Ayo Dosunmu (24)	Rudy Gobert (12)	Bones Hyland (7)	Gainbridge Fieldhouse; 17,274	47–32
80	April 8	@ Orlando	L 120–132	Terrence Shannon Jr. (33)	Joan Beringer (8)	Terrence Shannon Jr. (5)	Kia Center; 18,482	47–33
81	April 10	@ Houston	W 136–132	Terrence Shannon Jr. (23)	Jaden McDaniels (7)	Kyle Anderson (9)	Toyota Center; 18,113	48–33
82	April 12	New Orleans	W 132–126	Terrence Shannon Jr. (26)	Joan Beringer (13)	Joe Ingles (10)	Target Center; 18,978	49–33

2025–26 season schedule

=== Playoffs ===
2026 playoff game log
Total: 6–6 (home: 4–2; road: 2–4)
First Round: 4–2 (home: 3–0; road: 1–2)

Game	Date	Team	Score	High points	High rebounds	High assists	Location Attendance	Series
1	April 18	@ Denver	L 105–116	Anthony Edwards (22)	Rudy Gobert (10)	Anthony Edwards (7)	Ball Arena; 19,796	0–1
2	April 20	@ Denver	W 119–114	Anthony Edwards (30)	Anthony Edwards (10)	DiVincenzo, Randle (6)	Ball Arena; 19,692	1–1
3	April 23	Denver	W 113–96	Ayo Dosunmu (25)	Rudy Gobert (12)	Ayo Dosunmu (9)	Target Center; 18,978	2–1
4	April 25	Denver	W 112–96	Ayo Dosunmu (43)	Rudy Gobert (15)	Bones Hyland (7)	Target Center; 18,978	3–1
5	April 27	@ Denver	L 113–125	Julius Randle (27)	Julius Randle (9)	Anderson, Randle (6)	Ball Arena; 19,907	3–2
6	April 30	Denver	W 110–98	Jaden McDaniels (32)	Rudy Gobert (13)	Rudy Gobert (8)	Target Center; 18,978	4–2

Conference Semifinals: 2–4 (home: 1–2; road: 1–2)

Game	Date	Team	Score	High points	High rebounds	High assists	Location Attendance	Series
1	May 4	@ San Antonio	W 104–102	Julius Randle (21)	Gobert, Randle (10)	Mike Conley (6)	Frost Bank Center; 18,827	1–0
2	May 6	@ San Antonio	L 95–133	Tied (12)	Rudy Gobert (10)	Anderson, McDaniels (4)	Frost Bank Center; 19,185	1–1
3	May 8	San Antonio	L 108–115	Anthony Edwards (32)	Anthony Edwards (14)	Anthony Edwards (6)	Target Center; 18,978	1–2
4	May 10	San Antonio	W 114–109	Anthony Edwards (36)	Rudy Gobert (13)	Gobert, Reid (4)	Target Center; 18,978	2–2
5	May 12	@ San Antonio	L 97–126	Anthony Edwards (20)	Julius Randle (10)	Dosunmu, Shannon Jr. (4)	Frost Bank Center; 19,345	2–3
6	May 15	San Antonio	L 109–139	Anthony Edwards (24)	Randle, Reid (7)	Ayo Dosunmu (9)	Target Center; 18,978	2–4

2026 playoff schedule

=== NBA Cup ===
==== West Group A ====
Pos	Team	Pld	W	L	PF	PA	PD	Qualification
1	Oklahoma City Thunder	4	4	0	512	437	+75	Advanced to knockout rounds
2	Phoenix Suns	4	3	1	463	432	+31	Advanced to knockout rounds
3	Minnesota Timberwolves	4	2	2	479	434	+45	
4	Utah Jazz	4	1	3	433	518	−85	
5	Sacramento Kings	4	0	4	430	496	−66	

Source: NBA

== Player statistics ==
=== Regular season ===
Player	POS	GP	GS	MP	REB	AST	STL	BLK	PTS	MPG	RPG	APG	SPG	BPG	PPG
Donte DiVincenzo	SG	82	82	2,494	336	313	104	34	1,000	30.4	4.1	3.8	1.3	.4	12.2
Julius Randle	PF	79	79	2,610	532	398	86	18	1,667	33.0	6.7	5.0	1.1	.2	21.1
Naz Reid	PF	77	3	2,007	477	170	76	78	1,046	26.1	6.2	2.2	1.0	1.0	13.6
Rudy Gobert	C	76	76	2,380	872	128	58	124	829	31.3	11.5	1.7	.8	1.6	10.9
Jaden McDaniels	SF	73	73	2,316	310	199	81	73	1,084	31.7	4.2	2.7	1.1	1.0	14.8
Bones Hyland	PG	71	3	1,177	127	188	44	17	604	16.6	1.8	2.6	.6	.2	8.5
Jaylen Clark	SG	68	1	888	120	43	47	9	275	13.1	1.8	.6	.7	.1	4.0
Anthony Edwards	SG	61	60	2,137	302	226	83	49	1,757	35.0	5.0	3.7	1.4	.8	28.8
Mike Conley	PG	54	15	991	93	157	35	14	245	18.4	1.7	2.9	.6	.3	4.5
Terrence Shannon Jr.	SG	43	2	538	49	38	14	1	241	12.5	1.1	.9	.3	.0	5.6
Joan Beringer	C	40	3	314	92	12	7	26	156	7.9	2.3	.3	.2	.7	3.9
Rob Dillingham^{†}	PG	35	0	326	41	58	19	3	121	9.3	1.2	1.7	.5	.1	3.5
Joe Ingles	SF	27	2	153	19	34	9	2	41	5.7	.7	1.3	.3	.1	1.5
Ayo Dosunmu^{†}	SG	24	9	694	101	85	24	6	345	28.9	4.2	3.5	1.0	.3	14.4
Johnny Juzang	SG	21	0	88	17	6	2	1	43	4.2	.8	.3	.1	.0	2.0
Kyle Anderson^{†}	SF	19	2	363	70	62	16	12	87	19.1	3.7	3.3	.8	.6	4.6
Leonard Miller^{†}	SF	19	0	95	25	5	4	0	44	5.0	1.3	.3	.2	.0	2.3
Julian Phillips^{†}	SF	13	0	94	5	3	5	1	41	7.2	.4	.2	.4	.1	3.2
Zyon Pullin	SG	5	0	43	3	9	1	0	23	8.6	.6	1.8	.2	.0	4.6
Rocco Zikarsky	C	5	0	36	14	2	0	5	14	7.2	2.8	.4	.0	1.0	2.8
Enrique Freeman	PF	4	0	37	10	2	2	3	13	9.3	2.5	.5	.5	.8	3.3

=== Playoffs ===
Player	POS	GP	GS	MP	REB	AST	STL	BLK	PTS	MPG	RPG	APG	SPG	BPG	PPG
Mike Conley	PG	12	5	168	15	32	8	0	53	14.0	1.3	2.7	.7	.0	4.4
Rudy Gobert	C	12	12	372	112	28	14	13	86	31.0	9.3	2.3	1.2	1.1	7.2
Jaden McDaniels	SF	12	12	406	69	29	6	8	196	33.8	5.8	2.4	.5	.7	16.3
Julius Randle	PF	12	12	400	90	34	6	1	192	33.3	7.5	2.8	.5	.1	16.0
Naz Reid	PF	12	0	323	88	25	5	4	151	26.9	7.3	2.1	.4	.3	12.6
Ayo Dosunmu	SG	10	4	292	36	41	9	4	156	29.2	3.6	4.1	.9	.4	15.6
Anthony Edwards	SG	10	8	324	57	27	5	7	216	32.4	5.7	2.7	.5	.7	21.6
Bones Hyland	PG	10	0	116	13	15	4	1	46	11.6	1.3	1.5	.4	.1	4.6
Terrence Shannon Jr.	SG	9	3	203	23	12	4	0	106	22.6	2.6	1.3	.4	.0	11.8
Kyle Anderson	SF	8	0	61	7	15	2	0	15	7.6	.9	1.9	.3	.0	1.9
Jaylen Clark	SG	6	0	57	7	3	1	1	10	9.5	1.2	.5	.2	.2	1.7
Joan Beringer	C	5	0	23	11	0	2	2	16	4.6	2.2	.0	.4	.4	3.2
Julian Phillips	SF	5	0	25	1	2	2	0	6	5.0	.2	.4	.4	.0	1.2
Donte DiVincenzo	SG	4	4	96	15	16	7	0	43	24.0	3.8	4.0	1.8	.0	10.8
Joe Ingles	SF	3	0	14	2	0	2	0	7	4.7	.7	.0	.7	.0	2.3

- ^{†} Denotes player spent time with another team in the season. Stats reflect time with the Timberwolves only.

== Transactions ==
=== Trades ===
Date	Trade		Ref.
July 6, 2025	To Minnesota Timberwolves: 2027 second-round pick (from Cleveland); Cash considerations	To Atlanta Hawks: Nickeil Alexander-Walker (sign-and-trade)	
July 6, 2025	Seven-team trade		
July 6, 2025	To Atlanta Hawks: David Roddy (two-way contract); 2031 second-round pick swap (Note: Atlanta may swap their own pick for Houston's pick.); Cash considerations	To Los Angeles Lakers: Draft rights to Adou Thiero (No. 36)	
July 6, 2025	To Brooklyn Nets: 2026 second-round pick (Note: The second-most favorable of the picks originally belonging to Boston, Indiana, Los Angeles, and Miami.); 2030 second-round pick (from Boston)	To Houston Rockets: Kevin Durant; Clint Capela (sign-and-trade)	
July 6, 2025	To Phoenix Suns: Jalen Green; Dillon Brooks; Daeqwon Plowden (two-way contract); Draft rights to Khaman Maluach (No. 10); Draft rights to Rasheer Fleming (No. 31); Draft rights to Koby Brea (No. 41); 2026 second-round pick (Note: The second-most favorable of the picks originally belonging to Dallas, Oklahoma City, and Philadelphia.); Least favorable 2032 second-round pick between Houston and Minnesota	To Minnesota Timberwolves: Draft rights to Rocco Zikarsky (No. 45); 2026 second-round pick (Note: The less favorable of the picks originally belonging to Denver and Golden State.); 2032 second-round pick (Note: The less favorable of the picks originally belonging to Houston and Phoenix.); Cash considerations	
July 6, 2025	To Golden State Warriors: Draft rights to Alex Toohey (No. 52); Draft rights to Jahmai Mashack (No. 59) (Note: Golden State flipped Jahmai Mashack's rights to Memphis in a separate trade.)		
February 3, 2026	Three-team trade		
February 3, 2026	To Detroit Pistons: Kevin Huerter; Dario Šarić; 2026 protected first-round pick swap (from Minnesota)	To Chicago Bulls: Jaden Ivey; Mike Conley Jr.	
February 3, 2026	To Minnesota Timberwolves: Cash considerations		
February 5, 2025	To Chicago Bulls: Rob Dillingham; Leonard Miller; 2026 second-round pick (Note: The less favorable of the picks originally belonging to Denver and Golden State.); 2027 second-round pick (from Cleveland); 2031 second-round pick (Note: The more favorable of the picks originally belonging to Golden State and Minnesota.); 2032 second-round pick (Note: The more favorable of the picks originally belonging to Houston and Phoenix.)	To Minnesota Timberwolves: Ayo Dosunmu; Julian Phillips	

=== Free agency ===
==== Re-signed ====
Date	Player	Ref.
July 7	Joe Ingles	
July 14	Naz Reid	
July 16	Julius Randle	

==== Additions ====
Date	Player	Former Team	Ref.

==== Subtractions ====
Player	Reason	New Team	Ref.
Luka Garza	Free agency	Boston Celtics	
Josh Minott	Free agency	Boston Celtics	
