= Bill Crothers Secondary School =

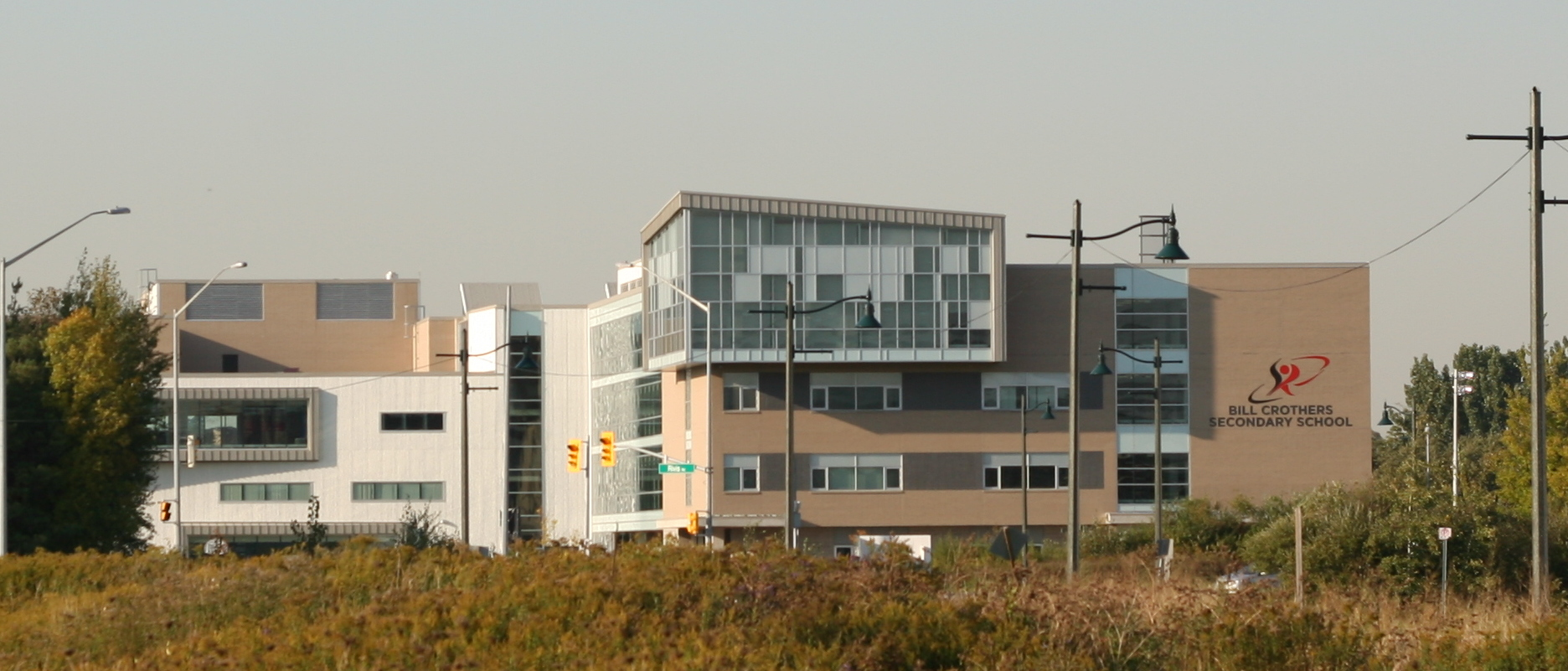
- Exterior view of Bill Crothers Secondary School

Location
- 44 Main Street; Unionville, Ontario, L4S 2T9; Canada; 43°51′24″N 79°18′44″W

Information
- School type: Public, High school
- Motto: To Develop In Students The Love Of Sport Through Learning, and The Love Of Learning Through Sport
- Religious affiliation: Secular
- Founded: August 2008
- School board: York Region District School Board
- Superintendent: Lisa Walsh
- Area trustee: Ed Law
- School number: 939585
- Administrator: Shirley DiFebo
- Principal: Wendy Luck; Vice Principals: Nicole Baxter-Lyn, George Ellinas, Tamara Vanderveen
- Grades: 9-12
- Enrolment: 1522 (October 2025)
- Colours: Red, black, and white
- Team name: Colts
- Community: CEC East
- Bell times: 8:45 AM – 3:00 PM (M, T, Th, F); 9:45 AM - 3:05 PM (W)
- Telephone: 905-477-8503; 647-795-7610
- Website: www.yrdsb.ca/schools/billcrothers.ss/Pages/default.aspx
- Last updated: May 2026

Bill Crothers Secondary School is an athletic based high school in the community of Unionville in Markham, Ontario, Canada. It was the newest secondary school in the York Region District School Board for a number of years, since 2008. Named for the former Olympic athlete and Chair of the York Region District School Board, Bill Crothers, the school opened its doors to Grade 9 and 10 students in August 2008. The school is 32 acres (130,000 m^{2}) and cost an estimated $32 million to build. The school was formerly an 18-hole golf course, Unionville Golf Centre, opened in 1961.

== Notable alumni ==
- Bianca Andreescu, Canadian tennis player, winner of 2019 US Open
- Trae Bell-Haynes, basketball player
- Joseph Blandisi, AHL ice hockey player
- Anthony Cirelli, ice hockey player for the Tampa Bay Lightning
- Andrew Coe, professional rugby player
- Kayla Cross Canadian tennis player
- Travis Dermott, ice hockey player for the Utah Mammoth
- Morgan Frost, NHL ice hockey player for the Calgary Flames
- Steven Furlano, Canadian soccer player
- Zachary Gingras, Canadian paralympic athlete
- Marc Liegghio, Canadian football kicker and punter for the Hamilton Tigercats
- Joshua Liendo, Canadian olympic swimmer
- Stephen Maar, Canadian volleyball player
- David Mackie, Canadian football player for the BC Lions
- Mariah Madigan, retired trampoline gymnast
- Emanuel Miller, Canadian college basketball player
- Leonard Miller, Canadian basketball player in the Chicago Bulls Organization
- Jayde Riviere, Canadian soccer player
- Roman Sadovsky, Canadian figure skater and YouTuber
- Alain Sargeant, Canadian soccer player
- Jonah Tong, MLB baseball player for the New York Mets
- Breanne Wilson-Bennett, ice hockey player
- Carol Zhao, Chinese-Canadian tennis player

== See also ==
- Education in Ontario
- List of secondary schools in Ontario
