= Emanuel Miller (basketball) =

Canadian basketball player (born 2000)

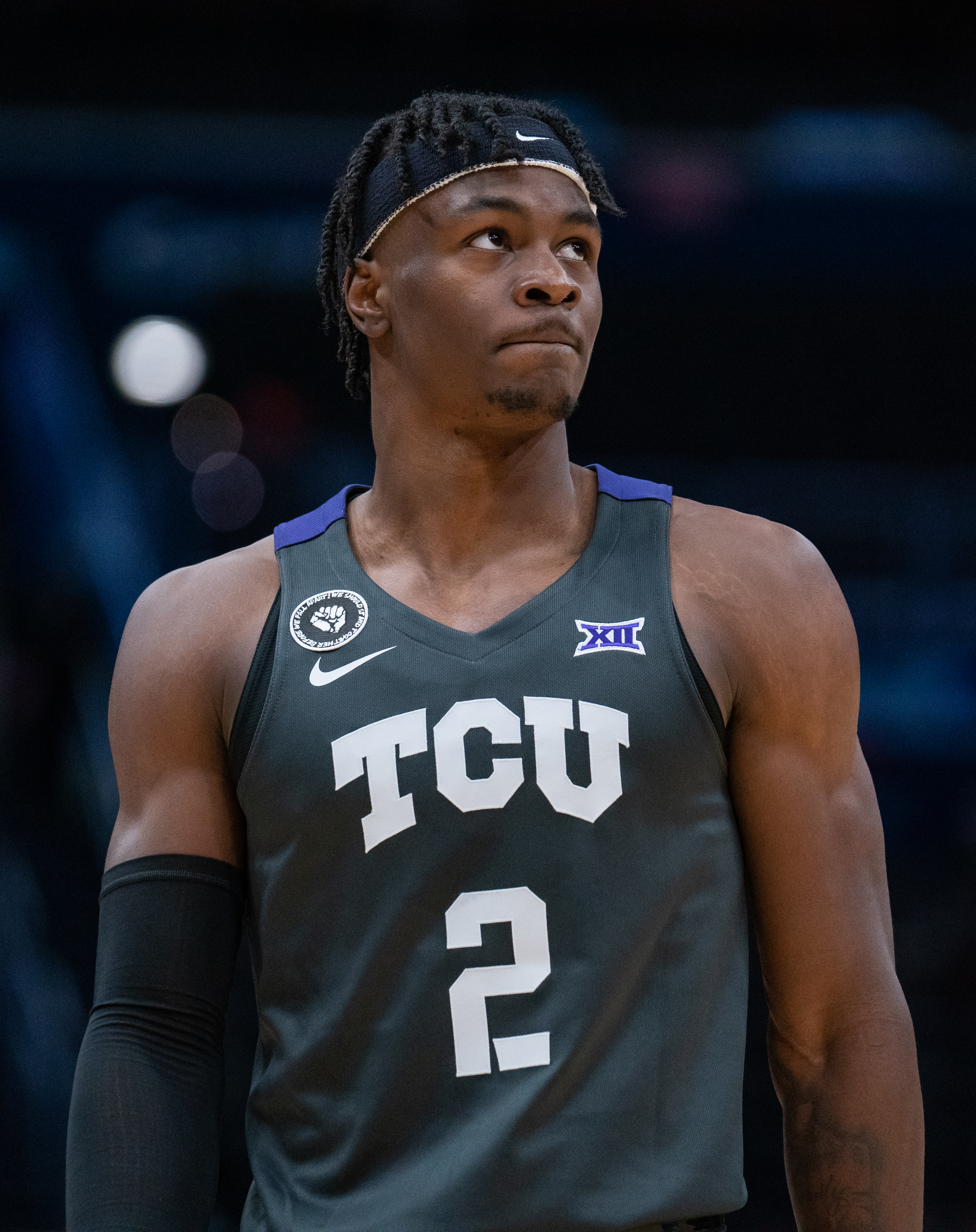
- Miller with TCU in 2021

No. 1 – Grand Rapids Gold
- Position: Small forward
- League: NBA G League

Personal information
- Born: June 19, 2000 (age 26) Scarborough, Ontario, Canada
- Listed height: 6 ft 5 in (1.96 m)
- Listed weight: 215 lb (98 kg)

Career information
- High school: Bill Crothers (Unionville, Ontario); La Lumiere School (La Porte, Indiana); Prolific Prep (Napa, California)
- College: Texas A&M (2019–2021); TCU (2021–2024)
- NBA draft: 2024: undrafted
- Playing career: 2024–present

Career history
- 2024: Texas Legends
- 2024–2026: Chicago Bulls
- 2024–2026: →Windy City Bulls
- 2026: Cleveland Charge
- 2026: Austin Spurs
- 2026–present: Grand Rapids Gold

Career highlights
- Second-team All-Big 12 (2024)
- Stats at NBA.com
- Stats at Basketball Reference
Medals
Men's basketball
Representing Canada
FIBA Under-19 World Cup
Gold medal – first place	2017 Egypt	Team
FIBA Americas U18 Championship
Silver medal – second place	2018 Canada	Team

Emanuel Miller (born June 19, 2000) is a Canadian professional basketball player for the Grand Rapids Gold of the NBA G League. He played college basketball for the Texas A&M Aggies and the TCU Horned Frogs.

== Early life ==
Miller began his high school career at Bill Crothers Secondary School. Prior to his junior season, he transferred to La Lumiere School. Miller transferred to Prolific Prep for his senior season. In October 2018, he committed to Virginia Tech over offers from Maryland, Minnesota, and Buffalo. After Buzz Williams accepted the head coaching position at Texas A&M, Miller followed him to play for the Aggies.

== College career ==
Miller averaged 6.4 points and 6.3 rebounds per game as a freshman. On January 26, 2021, he scored a career-high 28 points in a 78–54 loss to South Carolina. As a sophomore, Miller averaged 16.2 points and 8.2 rebounds per game. Following the season, he transferred to TCU, citing the desire of a fresh start. Miller averaged 10.3 points and 6.2 rebounds per game in his junior season. As a senior, he averaged 12.3 points and 6.5 rebounds per game. In his final season, Miller averaged 15.8 points and 6.1 rebounds per game. He was named to the Second Team All-Big 12.

== Professional career ==
=== Texas Legends (2024) ===
After going undrafted in the 2024 NBA draft, Miller signed with the Dallas Mavericks on July 12, 2024, and joined them for the 2024 NBA Summer League. However, he was waived by the Mavericks on October 18 and on October 26, he joined the Texas Legends.

=== Chicago Bulls (2024–2026) ===
On December 28, 2024, Miller signed a two-way contract with the Chicago Bulls. He made six appearances for the Bulls during the 2024–25 NBA season, averaging 1.7 points, 1.3 rebounds, and 0.3 assists.

Miller played in five contests for the Bulls during the 2025–26 NBA season, recording averages of 3.0 points, 0.6 rebounds, and 0.8 assists.

=== Austin Spurs (2026) ===
On February 1, 2026, Miller was traded to the Cleveland Cavaliers in a three-team trade that also included the Sacramento Kings. He was released by the Cavaliers on February 20, without making an appearance for the team. On February 23, the San Antonio Spurs signed Miller to a two-way contract. He did not make any appearances for San Antonio prior to being waived on July 22.

=== Grand Rapids Gold (2026–present) ===
Miller joined the Grand Rapids Gold for the 2026-27 season.

== National team career ==
Miller has represented Canada in several international competitions. In July 2017, he competed for the Canada team that won a gold medal at the FIBA U19 World Cup. Miller averaged 1.6 points and 1.7 rebounds per game. In June 2018, he was a key piece for the Canada team that captured a silver medal at the FIBA U18 Americas Championship. Miller averaged 17.3 points, 7.3 rebounds, 1.5 assists and 1.2 steals per game. In the semifinal win against Puerto Rico, he posted 31 points and 14 rebounds.

== Career statistics ==
Legend
GP	Games played	GS	Games started	MPG	Minutes per game
FG%	Field goal percentage	3P%	3-point field goal percentage	FT%	Free throw percentage
RPG	Rebounds per game	APG	Assists per game	SPG	Steals per game
BPG	Blocks per game	PPG	Points per game	**Bold**	Career high

=== NBA ===
==== Regular season ====
Year	Team	GP	GS	MPG	FG%	3P%	FT%	RPG	APG	SPG	BPG	PPG
2024–25	Chicago	**6**	0	4.2	**.500**	.000	**1.000**	**1.3**	.3	.2	.0	1.7
2025–26	Chicago	5	0	**6.6**	.462	**.333**	.500	.6	**.8**	**.4**	.0	**3.0**
Career		11	0	5.3	.476	.286	.750	1.0	.5	.3	.0	2.3

=== College ===
Year	Team	GP	GS	MPG	FG%	3P%	FT%	RPG	APG	SPG	BPG	PPG
2019–20	Texas A&M	30	25	24.6	.404	.143	.617	6.3	0.9	0.7	0.1	6.4
2020–21	Texas A&M	17	13	31.6	**.571**	.000	**.817**	**8.2**	1.4	0.8	0.1	**16.2**
2021–22	TCU	**34**	**34**	27.5	.493	.244	.688	6.2	0.9	0.7	0.8	10.3
2022–23	TCU	32	31	29.8	.505	**.392**	.652	6.5	1.7	0.9	**0.9**	12.3
2023–24	TCU	**34**	**34**	**32.6**	.486	.383	.815	6.1	**2.6**	**1.1**	0.4	15.8
Career		147	137	29.1	.493	.319	.734	6.5	1.5	0.8	0.5	11.9

== Personal life ==
Miller's younger brother Leonard plays for the Chicago Bulls of the NBA, after being traded by the Minnesota Timberwolves, whom he was drafted by in the second round of the 2023 NBA draft.
