= 2025–26 Chicago Bulls season =

2025–26 NBA season by team

- Head coach: Billy Donovan
- President: Michael Reinsdorf
- General manager: Marc Eversley (fired); Vacant
- Owner: Jerry Reinsdorf
- Arena: United Center

Results
- Record: 31–51 (.378)
- Place: Division: 4th (Central); Conference: 12th (Eastern)
- Playoff finish: Did not qualify
- Stats at Basketball Reference

Local media
- Television: Chicago Sports Network
- Radio: WLS; WSCR

The 2025–26 Chicago Bulls season was the 60th season for the franchise in the National Basketball Association (NBA).

The Bulls began the regular season 5–0, their best start since the 1996–97 season. However, they soon struggled, enduring a seven-game losing streak through November and December 2025. It was followed by an 11-game losing streak in February 2026, setting a franchise record for most losses in a winless month, surpassing the previous 0–10 mark set in November 1976. Josh Giddey, Coby White, Zach Collins, Noa Essengue (who would miss the rest of his rookie season early on), and Jalen Smith missed significant time due to injuries which plagued Chicago's record.

On January 24, 2026, the Bulls officially retired Derrick Rose's jersey number 1 immediately after their game against the Boston Celtics. In the February trade deadline period, the Bulls completed a league-high seven trades by dismantling its veteran core, trading away Coby White, Nikola Vučević, Ayo Dosunmu, Kevin Huerter, Dalen Terry, Julian Phillips, and Emanuel Miller. In exchange, Chicago acquired Jaden Ivey, Anfernee Simons, Collin Sexton, Rob Dillingham, Leonard Miller, Nick Richards, Guerschon Yabusele, and eight future second-round picks (reduced by one following a trade with the Charlotte Hornets due to White’s calf injury). Ivey, having been sidelined for the rest of the season due to a knee injury, was later waived on March 30 due to "conduct detrimental to the team" following his criticism about the NBA's involvement in Pride Month activities.

Following a loss to the Oklahoma City Thunder on March 27, the Bulls were eliminated from playoff contention for the fourth consecutive season, marking their first season missing the play-in tournament since 2021 and failing to improve upon their 39–43 record from each of their two previous seasons. The team would finish the regular season with a 31–51 record, placing 12th in the East.

On April 6, the Bulls fired executive vice president of basketball operations Artūras Karnišovas and general manager Marc Eversley.

This was unexpectedly the final season to feature Stacey King as color analyst for locally televised games, as he passed away on June 7 at the age of 59.

== Draft ==
Round	Pick	Player	Position	Nationality	College / Club
1	12	Noa Essengue	Power Forward	France	Ratiopharm Ulm (Germany)
2	45	Rocco Zikarsky	Center	Australia	Brisbane Bullets (Australia)

The Bulls entered the draft with one first-round selection and one second-round selection. While their original 2025 second-round pick ended up with the Sacramento Kings via San Antonio Spurs, the Bulls acquired a different 2025 second-round pick from Sacramento as an exchange for DeMar DeRozan in a 2024 trade. Chicago notably lost a coin toss against the Dallas Mavericks for higher draft lottery odds, which subsequently later led to Dallas claiming the #1 pick of the draft.

The Bulls later traded the #45 pick to the Los Angeles Lakers in exchange for cash and the #55 pick, Lachlan Olbrich.

== Roster ==
2025–26 Chicago Bulls roster
Players

Pos.	No.	Player	Height	Weight	DOB	From
F	14	Matas Buzelis	6 ft 8 in (2.03 m)	196 lb (89 kg)	2004-10-13	Sunrise Christian (KS)
F/C	12	Zach Collins (injured)	6 ft 9 in (2.06 m)	240 lb (109 kg)	1997-11-19	Gonzaga
G	7	Rob Dillingham	6 ft 2 in (1.88 m)	175 lb (79 kg)	2005-01-04	Kentucky
F	24	Noa Essengue (injured)	6 ft 8 in (2.03 m)	194 lb (88 kg)	2006-12-18	France
G	3	Josh Giddey	6 ft 7 in (2.01 m)	214 lb (97 kg)	2002-10-10	Australia
F	16	Mouhamadou Gueye	6 ft 9 in (2.06 m)	210 lb (95 kg)	1998-07-06	Pittsburgh
G	30	Tre Jones	6 ft 1 in (1.85 m)	190 lb (86 kg)	2000-01-08	Duke
G	8	Yuki Kawamura (TW)	5 ft 7 in (1.70 m)	159 lb (72 kg)	2001-03-02	Tokai University (JPN)
G	5	Mac McClung (TW)	6 ft 2 in (1.88 m)	185 lb (84 kg)	1999-01-06	Texas Tech
F	11	Leonard Miller	6 ft 10 in (2.08 m)	220 lb (100 kg)	2003-11-26	Fort Erie (CAN)
G/F	35	Isaac Okoro	6 ft 4 in (1.93 m)	225 lb (102 kg)	2001-01-26	Auburn
C	47	Lachlan Olbrich (TW)	6 ft 8 in (2.03 m)	236 lb (107 kg)	2003-12-30	UC Riverside
C	13	Nick Richards	6 ft 11 in (2.11 m)	245 lb (111 kg)	1997-11-29	Kentucky
G	2	Collin Sexton	6 ft 3 in (1.91 m)	190 lb (86 kg)	1999-01-04	Alabama
G	22	Anfernee Simons	6 ft 3 in (1.91 m)	200 lb (91 kg)	1999-06-08	IMG Academy (FL)
F/C	25	Jalen Smith	6 ft 8 in (2.03 m)	244 lb (111 kg)	2000-03-16	Maryland
F	44	Patrick Williams	6 ft 6 in (1.98 m)	235 lb (107 kg)	2001-08-26	Florida State
F	28	Guerschon Yabusele	6 ft 7 in (2.01 m)	265 lb (120 kg)	1995-12-17	France

Coaches
Head coach
- Tiago Splitter
Assistant(s)
- John Bryant
- Damian Cotter
- Dan Craig
- Henry Domercant
- Billy Schmidt
- Wes Unseld Jr.

Legend
- (DP) Unsigned draft pick
- (FA) Free agent
- (S) Suspended
- (GL) On assignment to G League affiliate
- (TW) Two-way affiliate player
- Injured

Roster
Updated: April 21, 2026

== Standings ==
=== Division ===
Central Division	W	L	PCT	GB	Home	Road	Div	GP
c – Detroit Pistons	60	22	.732	–	32‍–‍9	28‍–‍13	12‍–‍4	82
x – Cleveland Cavaliers	52	30	.634	8.0	27‍–‍14	25‍–‍16	10‍–‍5	82
Milwaukee Bucks	32	50	.390	28.0	19‍–‍22	13‍–‍28	9‍–‍7	82
Chicago Bulls	31	51	.378	29.0	18‍–‍23	13‍–‍28	4‍–‍12	82
Indiana Pacers	19	63	.232	41.0	11‍–‍29	8‍–‍34	4‍–‍12	82

=== Conference ===
Eastern Conference
#	Team	W	L	PCT	GB	GP
1	c – Detroit Pistons *	60	22	.732	–	82
2	y – Boston Celtics *	56	26	.683	4.0	82
3	x – New York Knicks	53	29	.646	7.0	82
4	x – Cleveland Cavaliers	52	30	.634	8.0	82
5	x – Toronto Raptors	46	36	.561	14.0	82
6	y – Atlanta Hawks *	46	36	.561	14.0	82
7	x – Philadelphia 76ers	45	37	.549	15.0	82
8	x – Orlando Magic	45	37	.549	15.0	82
9	pi – Charlotte Hornets	44	38	.537	16.0	82
10	pi – Miami Heat	43	39	.524	17.0	82
11	Milwaukee Bucks	32	50	.390	28.0	82
12	Chicago Bulls	31	51	.378	29.0	82
13	Brooklyn Nets	20	62	.244	40.0	82
14	Indiana Pacers	19	63	.232	41.0	82
15	Washington Wizards	17	65	.207	43.0	82

=== NBA Cup ===
==== East Group C ====
Pos	Team	Pld	W	L	PF	PA	PD	Qualification
1	New York Knicks	4	3	1	512	477	+35	Advanced to knockout rounds
2	Miami Heat	4	3	1	507	458	+49	Advanced to knockout rounds
3	Milwaukee Bucks	4	2	2	467	463	+4	
4	Charlotte Hornets	4	1	3	461	500	−39	
5	Chicago Bulls	4	1	3	468	517	−49	

Source: NBA

== Game log ==
=== Preseason ===
2025 preseason game log
Total: 3–2 (Home: 2–1; Road: 1–1)
Preseason: 3–2 (home: 2–1; road: 1–1)

Game	Date	Team	Score	High points	High rebounds	High assists	Location Attendance	Record
1	October 7	@ Cleveland	W 118–117	Matas Buzelis (19)	Buzelis, Smith (8)	Giddey, Kawamura (5)	Rocket Arena; 15,348	1–0
2	October 9	Cleveland	W 119–112	Ayo Dosunmu (16)	Zach Collins (8)	Tre Jones (7)	United Center; 16,258	2–0
3	October 12	Milwaukee	L 121–127	Ayo Dosunmu (22)	Nikola Vučević (9)	Josh Giddey (7)	United Center; 20,976	2–1
4	October 14	@ Denver	L 117–124	Josh Giddey (25)	Nikola Vučević (10)	Giddey, Terry (6)	Ball Arena; 16,567	2–2
5	October 16	Minnesota	W 126–120	Matas Buzelis (19)	Nikola Vučević (10)	Josh Giddey (9)	United Center; 17,573	3–2

2025–26 preseason schedule

=== Regular season ===
2025–26 game log
Total: 31–51 (Home: 18–23; Road: 13–28)
October: 5–0 (home: 4–0; road: 1–0)

Game	Date	Team	Score	High points	High rebounds	High assists	Location Attendance	Record
1	October 22	Detroit	W 115–111	Nikola Vučević (28)	Nikola Vučević (14)	Josh Giddey (11)	United Center; 21,381	1–0
2	October 25	@ Orlando	W 110–98	Josh Giddey (21)	Giddey, Vučević (8)	Tre Jones (8)	Kia Center; 19,117	2–0
3	October 27	Atlanta	W 128–123	Ayo Dosunmu (21)	Nikola Vučević (17)	Jones, Vučević (9)	United Center; 18,094	3–0
4	October 29	Sacramento	W 126–113	Matas Buzelis (27)	Nikola Vučević (14)	Josh Giddey (12)	United Center; 19,017	4–0
5	October 31	New York	W 135–125	Josh Giddey (32)	Josh Giddey (10)	Dosunmu, Giddey (9)	United Center; 18,330	5–0

November: 4–10 (home: 2–2; road: 2–8)

Game	Date	Team	Score	High points	High rebounds	High assists	Location Attendance	Record
6	November 2	@ New York	L 116–128	Josh Giddey (23)	Nikola Vučević (14)	Josh Giddey (12)	Madison Square Garden; 19,812	5–1
7	November 4	Philadelphia	W 113–111	Josh Giddey (29)	Josh Giddey (15)	Josh Giddey (12)	United Center; 21,016	6–1
8	November 7	@ Milwaukee	L 110–126	Matas Buzelis (20)	Matas Buzelis (8)	Josh Giddey (14)	Fiserv Forum; 17,839	6–2
9	November 8	@ Cleveland	L 122–128	Isaac Okoro (19)	Jalen Smith (11)	Josh Giddey (6)	Rocket Arena; 19,432	6–3
10	November 10	San Antonio	L 117–121	Kevin Huerter (23)	Jalen Smith (12)	Tre Jones (7)	United Center; 21,672	6–4
11	November 12	@ Detroit	L 113–124	Matas Buzelis (21)	Matas Buzelis (14)	Tre Jones (5)	Little Caesars Arena; 19,023	6–5
12	November 16	@ Utah	L 147–150 (2OT)	Coby White (27)	Nikola Vučević (13)	Josh Giddey (13)	Delta Center; 18,186	6–6
13	November 17	@ Denver	W 130–127	Dosunmu, Giddey (21)	Josh Giddey (14)	Giddey, Vučević (6)	Ball Arena; 19,951	7–6
14	November 19	@ Portland	W 122–121	Nikola Vučević (27)	Nikola Vučević (8)	Josh Giddey (13)	Moda Center; 17,795	8–6
15	November 21	Miami	L 107–143	Ayo Dosunmu (23)	Josh Giddey (11)	Josh Giddey (9)	United Center; 21,313	8–7
16	November 22	Washington	W 121–120	Nikola Vučević (28)	Giddey, Vučević (12)	Josh Giddey (11)	United Center; 21,302	9–7
17	November 24	@ New Orleans	L 130–143	Ayo Dosunmu (28)	Josh Giddey (7)	Tre Jones (11)	Smoothie King Center; 16,690	9–8
18	November 28	@ Charlotte	L 116–123	Giddey, White (25)	Nikola Vučević (14)	Josh Giddey (9)	Spectrum Center; 19,453	9–9
19	November 29	@ Indiana	L 101–103	Giddey, Jones (17)	Buzelis, Giddey (11)	Josh Giddey (7)	Gainbridge Fieldhouse; 17,006	9–10

December: 7–7 (home: 3–6; road: 4–1)

Game	Date	Team	Score	High points	High rebounds	High assists	Location Attendance	Record
20	December 1	@ Orlando	L 120–125	Josh Giddey (22)	Nikola Vučević (11)	Ayo Dosunmu (7)	Kia Center; 18,096	9–11
21	December 3	Brooklyn	L 103–113	Josh Giddey (28)	Giddey, Vučević (11)	Josh Giddey (11)	United Center; 20,633	9–12
22	December 5	Indiana	L 105–120	Coby White (22)	Matas Buzelis (12)	Giddey, White (6)	United Center; 20,471	9–13
23	December 7	Golden State	L 91–123	Josh Giddey (18)	Vučević, Williams (6)	Dosunmu, Giddey (5)	United Center; 18,449	9–14
24	December 12	@ Charlotte	W 129–126	Josh Giddey (26)	Jalen Smith (10)	Josh Giddey (11)	Spectrum Center; 16,205	10–14
25	December 14	New Orleans	L 104–114	Coby White (20)	Nikola Vučević (8)	Giddey, Jones, White (5)	United Center; 18,372	10–15
26	December 17	Cleveland	W 127–111	Coby White (25)	Josh Giddey (11)	Giddey, Jones (11)	United Center; 18,872	11–15
27	December 19	@ Cleveland	W 136–125	Buzelis, Vučević (24)	Nikola Vučević (15)	Coby White (9)	Rocket Arena; 19,432	12–15
28	December 21	@ Atlanta	W 152–150	Matas Buzelis (28)	Josh Giddey (9)	Josh Giddey (12)	State Farm Arena; 15,110	13–15
29	December 23	@ Atlanta	W 126–123	Coby White (24)	Josh Giddey (11)	Josh Giddey (15)	State Farm Arena; 15,367	14–15
30	December 26	Philadelphia	W 109–102	Collins, Jones (15)	Buzelis, Smith (8)	Josh Giddey (11)	United Center; 20,952	15–15
31	December 27	Milwaukee	L 103–112	Vučević, White (16)	Collins, Smith (10)	Josh Giddey (9)	United Center; 20,934	15–16
32	December 29	Minnesota	L 101–136	Nikola Vučević (23)	Tied (6)	Ayo Dosunmu (7)	United Center; 21,429	15–17
33	December 31	New Orleans	W 134–118	Isaac Okoro (24)	Jalen Smith (14)	Tre Jones (12)	United Center; 20,527	16–17

January: 8–8 (home: 6–3; road: 2–5)

Game	Date	Team	Score	High points	High rebounds	High assists	Location Attendance	Record
34	January 2	Orlando	W 121–114	Matas Buzelis (21)	Smith, Vučević (10)	Buzelis, Dosunmu (7)	United Center; 21,245	17–17
35	January 3	Charlotte	L 99–112	Nikola Vučević (28)	Kevin Huerter (11)	Jones, Vučević (8)	United Center; 21,315	17–18
36	January 5	@ Boston	L 101–115	Matas Buzelis (26)	Nikola Vučević (15)	Nikola Vučević (7)	TD Garden; 19,156	17–19
37	January 7	@ Detroit	L 93–108	Ayo Dosunmu (24)	Nikola Vučević (16)	Tre Jones (12)	Little Caesars Arena; 19,501	17–20
—	January 8	Miami	Postponed due to condensation on the court, rescheduled to January 29.					
38	January 10	Dallas	W 125–107	Coby White (22)	Nikola Vučević (12)	Ayo Dosunmu (8)	United Center; 19,753	18–20
39	January 13	@ Houston	L 113–119	Tre Jones (34)	Jalen Smith (9)	Tre Jones (7)	Toyota Center; 18,055	18–21
40	January 14	Utah	W 128–126	Nikola Vučević (35)	Jalen Smith (10)	Tre Jones (8)	United Center; 18,859	19–21
41	January 16	@ Brooklyn	L 109–112	Nikola Vučević (19)	Jalen Smith (13)	Tied (5)	Barclays Center; 17,548	19–22
42	January 18	Brooklyn	W 124–102	Coby White (24)	Nikola Vučević (11)	Tre Jones (10)	United Center; 19,753	20–22
43	January 20	L.A. Clippers	W 138–110	Coby White (27)	Jalen Smith (9)	Tre Jones (10)	United Center; 18,536	21–22
44	January 22	@ Minnesota	W 120–115	Coby White (22)	Nikola Vučević (8)	Tre Jones (7)	Target Center; 17,463	22–22
45	January 24	Boston	W 114–111	Coby White (22)	Jalen Smith (9)	Josh Giddey (10)	United Center; 22,093	23–22
46	January 26	L.A. Lakers	L 118–129	Coby White (23)	Nikola Vučević (11)	Josh Giddey (7)	United Center; 21,298	23–23
47	January 28	@ Indiana	L 110–113	Nikola Vučević (25)	Jalen Smith (11)	Josh Giddey (7)	Gainbridge Fieldhouse; 16,777	23–24
48	January 29	Miami	L 113–116	Ayo Dosunmu (23)	Huerter, Vučević (10)	Coby White (8)	United Center; 20,685	23–25
49	January 31 (Note: This game was originally scheduled for January 30, but was postponed to accommodate the January 8 game against Miami, which was rescheduled for January 29.)	@ Miami	W 125–118	Ayo Dosunmu (29)	Buzelis, Dosunmu (8)	Ayo Dosunmu (9)	Kaseya Center; 19,700	24–25

February: 0–11 (home: 0–6; road: 0–5)

Game	Date	Team	Score	High points	High rebounds	High assists	Location Attendance	Record
50	February 1	@ Miami	L 91–134	Coby White (16)	Patrick Williams (10)	Yuki Kawamura (6)	Kaseya Center; 19,700	24–26
51	February 3	@ Milwaukee	L 115–131	Matas Buzelis (22)	Coby White (10)	Ayo Dosunmu (8)	Fiserv Forum; 17,341	24–27
52	February 5	@ Toronto	L 107–123	Anfernee Simons (22)	Guerschon Yabusele (11)	Yuki Kawamura (7)	Scotiabank Arena; 18,795	24–28
53	February 7	Denver	L 120–136	Matas Buzelis (21)	Matas Buzelis (8)	Anfernee Simons (6)	United Center; 20,939	24–29
54	February 9	@ Brooklyn	L 115–123	Anfernee Simons (23)	Rob Dillingham (7)	Anfernee Simons (7)	Barclays Center; 17,038	24–30
55	February 11	@ Boston	L 105–124	Rob Dillingham (16)	Matas Buzelis (8)	Rob Dillingham (7)	TD Garden; 19,156	24–31
All-Star Game
56	February 19	Toronto	L 101–110	Anfernee Simons (20)	Jalen Smith (10)	Tre Jones (6)	United Center; 20,397	24–32
57	February 21	Detroit	L 110–126	Josh Giddey (27)	Guershon Yabusele (9)	Guershon Yabusele (8)	United Center; 21,589	24–33
58	February 22	New York	L 99–105	Matas Buzelis (15)	Richards, Yabusele (13)	Patrick Williams (8)	United Center; 19,628	24–34
59	February 24	Charlotte	L 99–131	Matas Buzelis (32)	Matas Buzelis (7)	Dillingham, Giddey (5)	United Center; 19,145	24–35
60	February 26	Portland	L 112–121	Matas Buzelis (20)	Nick Richards (10)	Josh Giddey (9)	United Center; 18,516	24–36

March: 5–10 (home: 3–3; road: 2–7)

Game	Date	Team	Score	High points	High rebounds	High assists	Location Attendance	Record
61	March 1	Milwaukee	W 120–97	Collin Sexton (22)	Josh Giddey (14)	Josh Giddey (10)	United Center; 20,749	25–36
62	March 3	Oklahoma City	L 108–116	Collin Sexton (20)	Nick Richards (13)	Josh Giddey (9)	United Center; 18,561	25–37
63	March 5	@ Phoenix	W 105–103	Collin Sexton (30)	Nick Richards (11)	Jones, Sexton (5)	Mortgage Matchup Center; 17,071	26–37
64	March 8	@ Sacramento	L 110–126	Collin Sexton (28)	Josh Giddey (12)	Josh Giddey (10)	Golden 1 Center; 15,022	26–38
65	March 10	@ Golden State	W 130–124	Matas Buzelis (41)	Josh Giddey (13)	Josh Giddey (17)	Chase Center; 18,064	27–38
66	March 12	@ L.A. Lakers	W 142–130	Josh Giddey (27)	Leonard Miller (9)	Josh Giddey (15)	Crypto.com Arena; 18,794	27–39
67	March 13	@ L.A. Clippers	L 108–119	Tre Jones (21)	Buzelis, Giddey (11)	Josh Giddey (10)	Intuit Dome; 17,927	27–40
68	March 16	Memphis	W 132–107	Matas Buzelis (29)	Josh Giddey (15)	Josh Giddey (13)	United Center; 20,157	28–40
69	March 18	Toronto	L 109–139	Matas Buzelis (19)	Matas Buzelis (7)	Jones, Sexton (5)	United Center; 19,082	28–41
70	March 19	Cleveland	L 110–115	Tre Jones (20)	Guerschon Yabusele (11)	Josh Giddey (19)	United Center; 19,763	28–42
71	March 23	Houston	W 132–124	Collin Sexton (25)	Leonard Miller (9)	Josh Giddey (13)	United Center; 21,395	29–42
72	March 25	@ Philadelphia	L 137–157	Josh Giddey (23)	Josh Giddey (9)	Josh Giddey (12)	Xfinity Mobile Arena; 18,921	29–43
73	March 27	@ Oklahoma City	L 113–131	Collin Sexton (22)	Matas Buzelis (9)	Josh Giddey (11)	Paycom Center; 18,203	29–44
74	March 28	@ Memphis	L 124–125	Matas Buzelis (29)	Josh Giddey (13)	Josh Giddey (10)	FedExForum; 16,883	29–45
75	March 30	@ San Antonio	L 114–129	Tre Jones (23)	Josh Giddey (7)	Josh Giddey (10)	Frost Bank Center; 18,904	29–46

April: 2–5 (home: 0–3; road: 2–2)

Game	Date	Team	Score	High points	High rebounds	High assists	Location Attendance	Record
76	April 1	Indiana	L 126–145	Guerschon Yabusele (20)	Matas Buzelis (9)	Matas Buzelis (6)	United Center; 21,312	29–47
77	April 3	@ New York	L 96–136	Collin Sexton (19)	Buzelis, Miller (6)	Tre Jones (8)	Madison Square Garden; 19,812	29–48
78	April 5	Phoenix	L 110–120	Tre Jones (29)	Leonard Miller (10)	Tre Jones (6)	United Center; 20,941	29–49
79	April 7	@ Washington	W 129–98	Rob Dillingham (26)	Collin Sexton (9)	Tre Jones (9)	Capital One Arena; 15,049	30–49
80	April 9	@ Washington	W 119–108	Tre Jones (31)	Leonard Miller (11)	Tied (4)	Capital One Arena; 15,482	31–49
81	April 10	Orlando	L 103–127	Tre Jones (23)	Lachlan Olbrich (9)	Lachlan Olbrich (5)	United Center; 21,522	31–50
82	April 12	@ Dallas	L 128–149	Rob Dillingham (25)	Lachlan Olbrich (15)	Lachlan Olbrich (10)	American Airlines Center; 20,232	31–51

2025–26 season schedule

== Player statistics ==
Player	Pos.	GP	GS	MP	Reb.	Ast.	Stl.	Blk.	Pts.
Matas Buzelis	SF	77	77	2,248	448	158	55	116	1,252
Jevon Carter^{‡}	PG	23	0	254	26	19	13	2	124
Zach Collins	C	10	0	184	56	15	2	4	97
Rob Dillingham^{≠}	PG	30	0	644	90	85	28	3	288
Ayo Dosunmu^{†}	SG	45	10	1,187	136	164	34	12	677
Noa Essengue	F	2	0	6	0	0	1	0	0
Trentyn Flowers	SF	2	0	6	1	1	0	0	4
Josh Giddey	F	54	51	1,731	448	494	55	27	919
Mouhamadou Gueye	F	2	0	45	6	6	2	1	16
Kevin Huerter^{†}	SG	44	11	1,037	169	116	35	26	479
Jaden Ivey^{≠}	SG	4	3	115	19	16	8	2	46
Tre Jones	PG	65	41	1,752	204	350	76	11	914
Yuki Kawamura	PG	18	0	209	33	47	9	0	62
Mac McClung	PG	8	0	101	6	9	6	2	48
Emanuel Miller^{†}	PF	5	0	33	3	4	2	0	15
Leonard Miller^{≠}	SF	27	12	624	156	35	13	15	317
Isaac Okoro	G/F	63	62	1,695	173	100	46	29	584
Lachlan Olbrich	PF	37	2	344	112	42	12	8	89
Julian Phillips^{†}	SF	35	2	334	44	7	17	6	99
Nick Richards^{≠}	C	20	4	447	152	8	6	18	187
Collin Sexton^{≠}	PG	26	10	676	75	66	40	3	454
Anfernee Simons^{≠}	SG	6	5	170	17	18	0	2	91
Jalen Smith	F	53	21	1,095	355	65	24	42	541
Dalen Terry^{†}	G	34	0	377	64	43	22	11	118
Nikola Vučević^{†}	C	48	48	1,480	431	181	32	31	810
Coby White^{†}	PG	29	26	843	108	136	20	2	540
Patrick Williams	PF	72	6	1,474	215	105	49	26	505
Guerschon Yabusele^{≠}	C	26	19	641	147	45	20	11	261

After all games.
^{‡}Waived during the season
^{†}Traded during the season
^{≠}Acquired during the season

== Transactions ==
=== Trades ===
Date	Trade		Ref.
July 1, 2025	To Chicago Bulls: Draft rights to Lachlan Olbrich (No. 55); Cash considerations	To Los Angeles Lakers: Draft rights to Rocco Zikarsky (Note: LA Lakers flipped Zikarsky's rights to Minnesota in a separate trade.) (No. 45)	
July 6, 2025	To Chicago Bulls: Isaac Okoro	To Cleveland Cavaliers: Lonzo Ball	
February 1, 2026	Three-team trade		
February 1, 2026	To Chicago Bulls: Dario Šarić (from Sacramento); 2027 DEN second-round pick (from Cleveland); 2029 SAC second-round pick (Note: The least favorable of the picks originally belonging to Detroit, Milwaukee, and New York.) (from Sacramento)	To Cleveland Cavaliers: Keon Ellis (from Sacramento); Emanuel Miller (from Chicago); Dennis Schröder (from Sacramento)	
February 1, 2026	To Sacramento Kings: De'Andre Hunter (from Cleveland)		
February 3, 2026	Three-team trade		
February 3, 2026	To Chicago Bulls: Mike Conley Jr. (from Minnesota); Jaden Ivey (from Detroit)	To Detroit Pistons: Kevin Huerter (from Chicago); Dario Šarić (from Chicago); 2026 MIN protected first-round swap right (Note: Detroit can swap picks if Minnesota's pick is No. 20–30.) (from Minnesota)	
February 3, 2026	To Minnesota Timberwolves: Cash considerations (Note: None of the teams' press releases state who Minnesota received the cash considerations from.)		
February 4, 2026	To Chicago Bulls: Ousmane Dieng (Note: Oklahoma City traded Dieng to Charlotte, which then flipped him to Chicago. This was originally reported to be a three-team trade but was made official as two separate trades.); Collin Sexton; ~~2029 second-round pick~~ (Note: The less favorable of the picks originally belonging to Charlotte and Denver. Initially included in the trade, this pick was removed after White's physical found a calf injury requiring him to miss some time.); 2031 NYK second-round pick; 2031 DEN second-round pick	To Charlotte Hornets: Mike Conley Jr.; Coby White	Amended; Feb. 6
February 4, 2026	To Chicago Bulls: Anfernee Simons; 2026 second-round pick (Note: The most favorable of the picks originally belonging to Minnesota, New Orleans, New York, and Portland.)	To Boston Celtics: Nikola Vučević; 2027 DEN second-round pick	
February 5, 2026	To Chicago Bulls: Rob Dillingham; Leonard Miller; 2026 second-round pick (Note: The less favorable of the picks originally belonging to Denver and Golden State.); 2027 CLE second-round pick; 2031 second-round pick (Note: The more favorable of the picks originally belonging to Golden State and Minnesota.); 2032 second-round pick (Note: The more favorable of the picks originally belonging to Houston and Phoenix.)	To Minnesota Timberwolves: Ayo Dosunmu; Julian Phillips	
February 5, 2026	To Chicago Bulls: Guerschon Yabusele; Cash considerations	To New York Knicks: Dalen Terry	
February 5, 2026	Three-team trade		
February 5, 2026	To Chicago Bulls: Nick Richards (from Phoenix)	To Milwaukee Bucks: Ousmane Dieng (from Chicago); Nigel Hayes-Davis (from Phoenix)	
February 5, 2026	To Phoenix Suns: Cole Anthony (from Milwaukee); Amir Coffey (from Milwaukee)		

=== Free agency ===
==== Re-signed ====
Date	Player	Ref.
July 1	Emanuel Miller	
September 24	Josh Giddey	

==== Additions ====
Date	Player	Former Team	Ref.
July 19	Yuki Kawamura	Memphis Grizzlies	

==== Subtractions ====
Player	Reason	New Team	Ref.
Jahmir Young	Waived	Miami Heat	
Adama Sanogo	Free agency	Trapani Shark (Italy)	
Talen Horton-Tucker	Free agency	Fenerbahçe (Turkey)	
Mac McClung	Waived	Indiana Pacers	
Trentyn Flowers	Waived	Brampton Honey Badgers (Canada)	
Jevon Carter	Waived	Orlando Magic	
Jaden Ivey	Waived via detrimental team conduct		
