= Ayo Dosunmu =

American basketball player (born 2000)

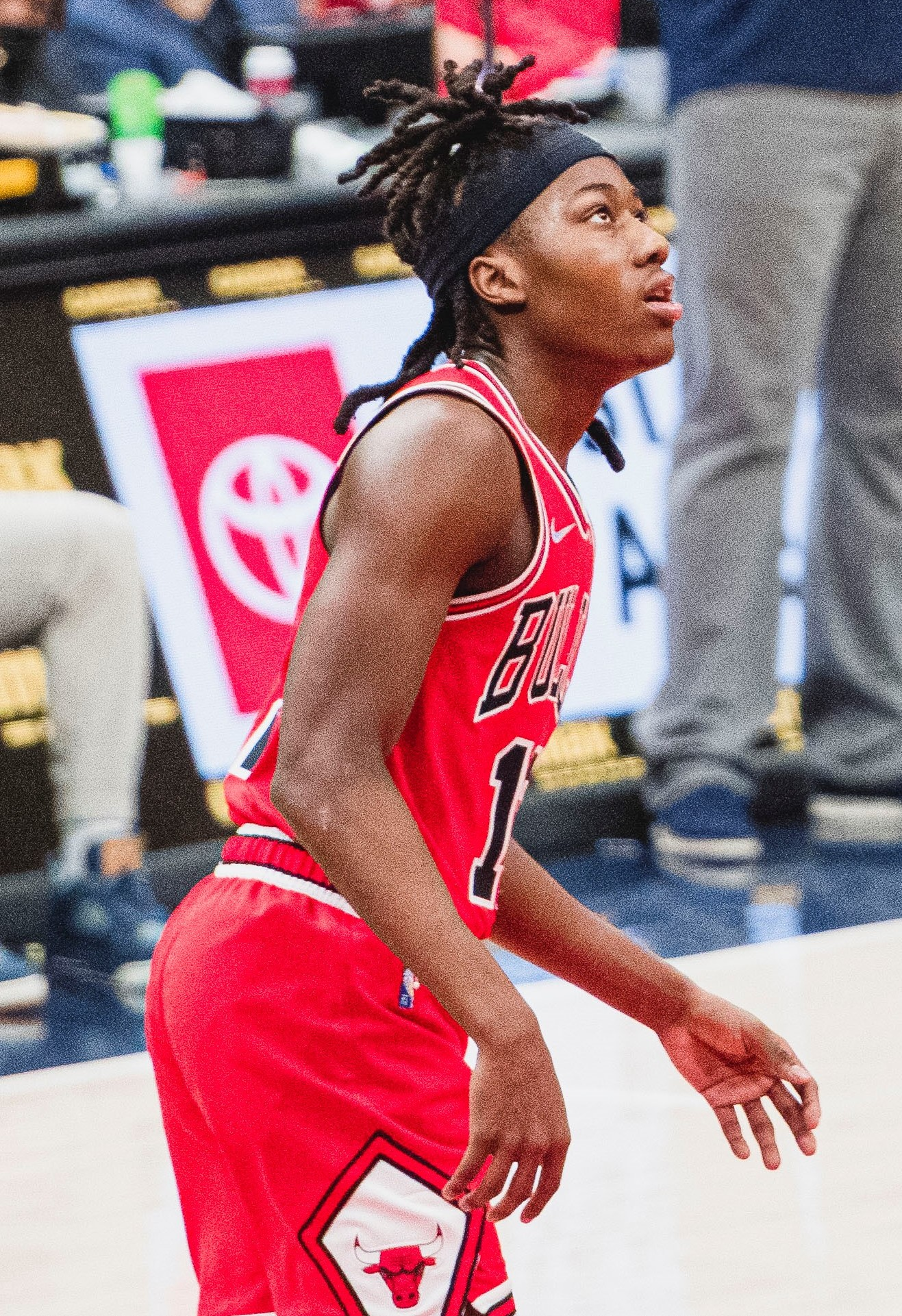
- Dosunmu with the Chicago Bulls in 2022

No. 13 – Minnesota Timberwolves
- Position: Shooting guard
- League: NBA

Personal information
- Born: January 17, 2000 (age 26) Chicago, Illinois, U.S.
- Listed height: 6 ft 4 in (1.93 m)
- Listed weight: 201 lb (91 kg)

Career information
- High school: Westinghouse (Chicago, Illinois); Morgan Park (Chicago, Illinois)
- College: Illinois (2018–2021)
- NBA draft: 2021: 2nd round, 38th overall pick
- Drafted by: Chicago Bulls
- Playing career: 2021–present

Career history
- 2021–2026: Chicago Bulls
- 2026–present: Minnesota Timberwolves

Career highlights
- NBA All-Rookie Second Team (2022); Bob Cousy Award (2021); Consensus first-team All-American (2021); 2× First-team All-Big Ten – Media (2020, 2021); First-team All-Big Ten – Coaches (2021); Second-team All-Big Ten – Coaches (2020); Big Ten All-Freshman Team (2019); Big Ten tournament MOP (2021); No. 11 jersey honored by Illinois Fighting Illini
- Stats at NBA.com
- Stats at Basketball Reference
Medals
Men's basketball
Representing United States
FIBA Americas U18 Championship
Gold medal – first place	2018 St. Catharines	Team

Quamdeen Ayopo "Ayo" Dosunmu (born January 17, 2000) is an American professional basketball player for the Minnesota Timberwolves of the National Basketball Association (NBA). He played college basketball for the Illinois Fighting Illini, earning consensus first-team All-American honors in his junior season. The Chicago Bulls selected him with the 38th pick in the 2021 NBA draft.

== Early life ==
Ayo Dosunmu was born in Chicago to a Nigerian father and African American mother. His father descends from the Yoruba people in Nigeria, and his name Ayo means "joy" in the Yoruba language. Dosunmu began his high school career at Chicago's Westinghouse College Prep, where he helped lead the Warriors to a 2015 conference championship against Al Raby High School and scored a season-high 40 points against Crane High School as a freshman, earning Chicago Sun-Times All-City Accolades. Dosunmu transferred after his freshman year to Morgan Park. During his junior year, Dosunmu led the Mustangs to a 3A State Championship, although he was unable to play in the championship game due to injury. In his senior year, Dosunmu led the Mustangs once again to a state championship, in which he scored 28 points; breaking an IHSA record for points scored in a championship game.

In March 2018, Dosunmu was named one of 26 high school seniors who participated in the Jordan Brand Classic on April 8, 2018, at the Barclays Center in Brooklyn, New York. Dosunmu is the third Illini to be selected to play in the Jordan Classic, joining Dee Brown who played for the Red team in 2002 and Jalen Coleman-Lands who played in 2015. Dosunmu was also selected to play in the second annual Iverson Roundball Classic All-American Game in April 2018 at Souderton Area High School outside of Philadelphia, Pennsylvania. During his senior season, Dosunmu averaged 25.2 points, 7.4 rebounds, 7.3 assists and 2.7 steals, leading Morgan Park to a second-straight IHSA Class 3A championship. Dosunmu was also named a Consensus first-team All-State selection by the Associated Press, Chicago Tribune, Chicago Sun-Times, Champaign News-Gazette and Illinois Basketball Coaches Association (IBCA) following his senior season.

On October 19, 2017, Dosunmu verbally committed to play college basketball for Illinois and head coach Brad Underwood. Dosunmu announced his commitment to Illinois over Wake Forest at the flagship Jordan Brand Store on State Street in the Chicago Loop. Dosunmu signed his National Letter of Intent in November 2017 to attend Illinois.

College recruiting
Name	Hometown	School	Height	Weight	Commit date
Ayo Dosunmu; PG	Chicago, IL	Morgan Park (IL)	6 ft 5 in (1.96 m)	185 lb (84 kg)	Oct 19, 2017
Ayo Dosunmu; PG	Recruit ratings: Rivals: 247Sports: ESPN: (89)				
Overall recruit ranking: Rivals: 30 247Sports: 30 ESPN: 36
Note: In many cases, Scout, Rivals, 247Sports, On3, and ESPN may conflict in their listings of height and weight.; In these cases, the average was taken. ESPN grades are on a 100-point scale.; Sources: "Illinois 2018 Basketball Commitments". Rivals.; "2018 Illinois Fighting Illini Recruiting Class". ESPN.; "2018 Team Ranking". Rivals.

== College career ==
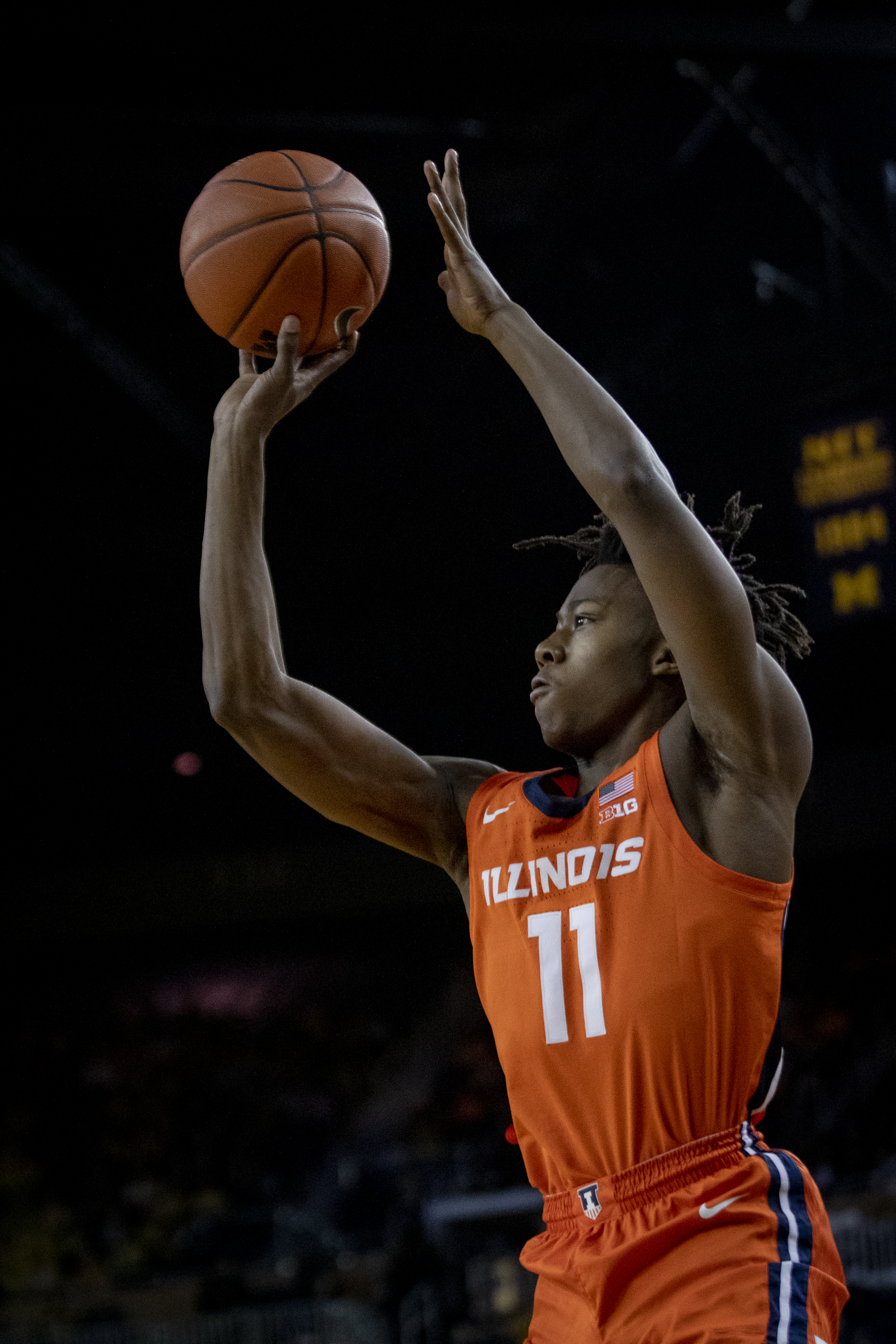
Dosunmu with Illinois in 2020

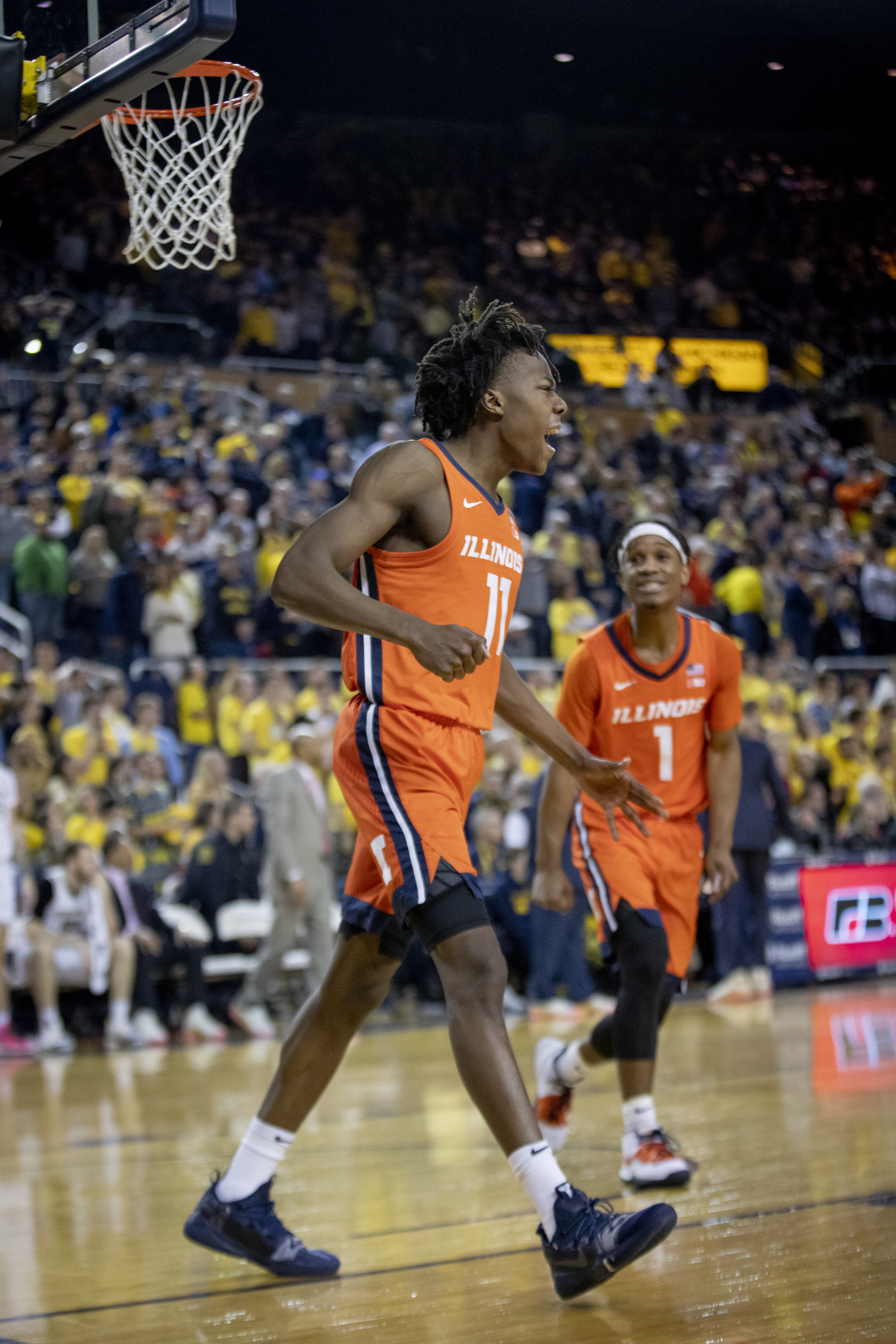
Dosunmu (left) with Illinois in 2020

=== 2018–19 season ===
Dosunmu made his college debut on November 8, 2018, against Evansville, recording 18 points on 8-of-15 shooting, with six rebounds, four assists and three steals. Following the season, Dosunmu was named to the All-Big Ten Freshman Team and was named as an honorable mention for the All-Big Ten team. He averaged 13.8 points and 3.3 assists per game as a freshman.

=== 2019–20 season ===
Dosunmu hit a last-second jump shot in a 64–62 win over Michigan on January 25, 2020, and finished with 27 points. On February 11, Dosunmu was injured late in a 70–69 loss to Michigan State. Despite an MRI showing no structural damage, Dosunmu missed the following game against Rutgers. In his return from injury, Dosunmu scored 24 points in a 62–56 win at Penn State. At the close of the regular season, Dosunmu was named to the First Team All-Big Ten by the media and Second Team by the coaches. As a sophomore, Dosunmu averaged 16.6 points, 4.3 rebounds, and 3.3 assists per game. Following the season, Dosunmu declared for the 2020 NBA draft. Dosunmu withdrew from the draft to return to Illinois for his junior season on July 31, 2020.

=== 2020–21 season ===
In his junior season debut on November 25, 2020, Dosunmu recorded 28 points, 10 rebounds and five assists in a 122–60 win against North Carolina A&T. On December 12, he scored a career-high 36 points in an 81–78 loss to Missouri. On February 6, 2021, he became the third player in program history to register a triple-double, with 21 points, 12 rebounds and 12 assists in a 75–60 victory over Wisconsin. On February 20, Dosunmu recorded his second triple-double, with 19 points, 10 rebounds and 10 assists in a 94–63 win over Minnesota. On February 23, Dosunmu suffered a broken nose during an 81–72 loss to Michigan State. On March 14, he recorded 16 points and nine rebounds in a 91–88 win over Ohio State in the Big Ten Men's Basketball Championship game. He was named the Big Ten tournament Most Outstanding Player. Dosunmu was a consensus first-team All-American and won the Bob Cousy Award as top point guard in the nation. On April 6, 2021, Dosunmu declared for the 2021 NBA draft, ending his three-year career with Illinois.

=== Legacy ===
On January 6, 2022, Dosunmu's number 11 was honored by the Illini; the program does not retire jerseys. Bulls teammate and mentor, DeMar DeRozan, attended the celebration.

== Professional career ==
=== Chicago Bulls (2021–2026) ===
Dosunmu's hometown team, the Chicago Bulls, selected him in the second round of the 2021 NBA draft with the 38th pick. On August 18, 2021, the Bulls announced that they had signed Dosunmu. On December 8, Dosunmu entered the Bulls' starting lineup. He scored 11 points along with six rebounds and eight assists in a 109–97 victory over the Denver Nuggets. On January 25, 2022, Dosunmu opened with nine consecutive made field goals, surpassing Orlando Woolridge's Bulls rookie record of eight.

On December 21, 2022, Dosunmu put up a buzzer-beating, game-winning putback in a 110–108 win over the Atlanta Hawks. On July 23, 2023, he re-signed with the Chicago Bulls to a three-year, $21 million contract.

On February 12, 2024, Dosunmu scored a then career-high 29 points, with a season-high seven assists, in a 136–126 win against the Atlanta Hawks. On March 16, Dosunmu scored a career-high 34 points in a 127–98 win over the Washington Wizards.

On December 5, 2024, Dosunmu achieved his first career triple-double with 27 points, 10 rebounds, and 11 assists, in a 139-124 win over the San Antonio Spurs. In 46 appearances (26 starts) for Chicago during the 2024–25 NBA season, he averaged 12.3 points, 3.5 rebounds, and 4.5 assists. On March 4, 2025, it was announced that Dosunmu would miss 4-to-6 weeks following surgery to repair a fracture in the back of his left shoulder. The procedure subsequently ended Dosunmu's season.

On January 31, 2026, Dosunmu scored 29 points in a 125-118 win over the Miami Heat. Dosunmu shot 5-for-6 from beyond the three-point line and made every field goal he attempted in the second half. He made 45 appearances (10 starts) for Chicago during the 2025–26 NBA season, averaging 15.0 points, 3.0 rebounds, and 3.6 assists.

=== Minnesota Timberwolves (2026–present) ===
On February 4, 2026, Dosunmu and Julian Philips were traded to the Minnesota Timberwolves in exchange for Rob Dillingham, Leonard Miller, and four second-round picks. On February 8, Dosunmu made his Timberwolves debut, scoring 11 points along with two steals in a 115–96 loss against the Los Angeles Clippers. Shooting 50–40–90 with the Timberwolves, he soon became known for his exciting and fast-paced backcourt with Bones Hyland, with the duo being nicknamed the "Twin Turbos". On March 30, Dosunmu put up a triple-double with 18 points, a career-high 15 rebounds, and 12 assists in a 124–94 win over the Dallas Mavericks. On April 23, Dosunmu led the Timberwolves in scoring with 25 points, along with nine assists, in a 113–96 win against the Denver Nuggets in Game 3 of the Western Conference First Round. On April 25, Dosunmu recorded a career-high 43 points, including a perfect 5-for-5 from three-point range, in a 112–96 Game 4 win.

On June 23, 2026, Dosunmu re-signed with the Timberwolves on a five-year, $112 million contract.

== National team career ==
In May 2018, Dosunmu was among the 32 players who earned an invitation to the training camp at the United States Olympic Training Center in Colorado Springs, Colorado for USA Basketball Men's U18 National Team in preparation for the 2018 FIBA Under-18 Americas Championship. Dosunmu won a gold medal with the U18 National Team, while averaging 9.5 points, 4.5 assists and 2.3 rebounds during the international competition.

== Pop Culture ==
In 2022, Dosunmu guest starred in a non-speaking role on the third season of the HBO Max comedy South Side (TV series).

== Career statistics ==
Legend
GP	Games played	GS	Games started	MPG	Minutes per game
FG%	Field goal percentage	3P%	3-point field goal percentage	FT%	Free throw percentage
RPG	Rebounds per game	APG	Assists per game	SPG	Steals per game
BPG	Blocks per game	PPG	Points per game	**Bold**	Career high

=== NBA ===
==== Regular season ====
Year	Team	GP	GS	MPG	FG%	3P%	FT%	RPG	APG	SPG	BPG	PPG
2021–22	Chicago	77	40	27.4	.520	.376	.679	2.8	3.3	.8	.4	8.8
2022–23	Chicago	**80**	**51**	26.2	.493	.312	.805	2.8	2.6	.8	.3	8.6
2023–24	Chicago	76	37	29.1	.501	.403	.810	2.8	3.2	.9	**.5**	12.2
2024–25	Chicago	46	26	**30.3**	.492	.328	.785	3.5	**4.5**	.9	.4	12.3
2025–26	Chicago	45	10	26.4	.514	**.451**	.857	3.0	3.6	.8	.3	**15.0**
2025–26	Minnesota	24	9	28.9	**.521**	.414	**.925**	**4.2**	3.5	**1.0**	.3	14.4
Career		348	173	27.9	.505	.380	.804	3.0	3.3	.8	.4	11.1

==== Playoffs ====
Year	Team	GP	GS	MPG	FG%	3P%	FT%	RPG	APG	SPG	BPG	PPG
2022	Chicago	5	1	17.2	.308	.231	**1.000**	2.6	2.2	.2	.0	4.0
2026	Minnesota	**10**	**4**	**29.2**	**.500**	**.425**	.926	**3.6**	**4.1**	**.9**	**.4**	**15.6**
Career		15	5	25.2	.464	.377	.929	3.3	3.5	.7	.3	11.7

=== College ===
Year	Team	GP	GS	MPG	FG%	3P%	FT%	RPG	APG	SPG	BPG	PPG
2018–19	Illinois	**32**	**32**	31.3	.435	.352	.695	4.0	3.3	**1.3**	**.3**	13.8
2019–20	Illinois	30	30	33.5	.484	.296	.755	4.3	3.3	.8	.2	16.6
2020–21	Illinois	28	28	**35.1**	**.488**	**.390**	**.783**	**6.3**	**5.3**	1.1	.2	**20.1**
Career		90	90	33.2	.470	.345	.750	4.8	3.9	1.1	.2	16.7
