= 2025–26 Golden State Warriors season =

- Head coach: Steve Kerr
- President: Brandon Schneider
- General manager: Mike Dunleavy Jr.
- Owners: Joe Lacob; Peter Guber
- Arena: Chase Center

Results
- Record: 37–45 (.451)
- Place: Division: 4th (Pacific); Conference: 10th (Western)
- Playoff finish: Did not qualify
- Stats at Basketball Reference

Local media
- Television: NBC Sports Bay Area
- Radio: 95.7 The Game

The 2025–26 Golden State Warriors season was the 80th season of the franchise in the National Basketball Association (NBA), their 64th in the San Francisco Bay Area, and their seventh season at the Chase Center.

Despite a 4-1 start, the Warriors struggled throughout the season. Star player Jimmy Butler suffered a season-ending ACL injury on January 19, 2026 against the Miami Heat which sidelined him for the rest of the season.

With their loss against the eventual NBA champion New York Knicks on March 15, the Warriors failed to improve on their 48–34 record from the previous season. Following their loss to the Houston Rockets on April 5, the Warriors suffered their first losing season since 2020, and their first in a full season since 2011.

On March 29, the Warriors clinched a play-in spot for the third straight year. They eventually finished 10th in the West with a 37–45 regular season record. In the first stage of the play-in, they eliminated the Los Angeles Clippers through a comeback win. However, they were soundly beaten by the Phoenix Suns in the second stage, eliminating them from playoff contention for the second time in three seasons and the fourth time since 2020.

== Draft picks ==
Round	Pick	Player	Position	Nationality	College / Club
2	41	Koby Brea	SG	Dominican Republic	Kentucky (Sr.)

The Warriors entered the draft holding only one selection, which was the 41st overall pick in the second round. The pick originally belonged to the Miami Heat and was conveyed to the Warriors when it fell outside its top-37 protection as part of a December 2024 trade with the Brooklyn Nets. The Warriors previously traded their original first and second-round selections to Miami (as part of the Jimmy Butler deal in February 2025) and Brooklyn (ended up with the Memphis Grizzlies on draft night), respectively.

During the second round of the draft, Golden State traded the draft rights to the 41st pick (Koby Brea) to the Phoenix Suns in exchange for the rights to the 52nd (Alex Toohey) and 59th (Jahmai Mashack) selections. In a subsequent transaction, the Warriors acquired the rights to the 56th pick (Will Richard) from the Memphis Grizzlies in exchange for the rights to the 59th pick (Jahmai Mashack), the rights to Justinian Jessup (51st pick in 2020), and a protected 2032 second-round pick.

== Roster ==
2025–26 Golden State Warriors roster
Players

Pos.	No.	Player	Height	Weight	DOB	From
F/C	28	Charles Bassey	6 ft 10 in (2.08 m)	230 lb (104 kg)	2000-10-28	Western Kentucky
F	10	Jimmy Butler (injured)	6 ft 6 in (1.98 m)	230 lb (104 kg)	1989-09-14	Marquette
G	18	LJ Cryer (TW)	6 ft 0 in (1.83 m)	200 lb (91 kg)	2001-10-09	Houston
G	31	Seth Curry	6 ft 1 in (1.85 m)	185 lb (84 kg)	1990-08-23	Duke
G	30	Stephen Curry	6 ft 2 in (1.88 m)	185 lb (84 kg)	1988-03-14	Davidson
F	23	Draymond Green	6 ft 6 in (1.98 m)	230 lb (104 kg)	1990-03-04	Michigan State
F/C	20	Al Horford	6 ft 8 in (2.03 m)	240 lb (109 kg)	1986-06-03	Florida
F	33	Malevy Leons (TW)	6 ft 9 in (2.06 m)	210 lb (95 kg)	1999-09-23	Bradley
G	8	De'Anthony Melton	6 ft 2 in (1.88 m)	200 lb (91 kg)	1998-05-28	USC
G	4	Moses Moody (injured)	6 ft 5 in (1.96 m)	211 lb (96 kg)	2002-05-31	Arkansas
G	0	Gary Payton II	6 ft 2 in (1.88 m)	195 lb (88 kg)	1992-12-01	Oregon State
G	2	Brandin Podziemski	6 ft 4 in (1.93 m)	205 lb (93 kg)	2003-02-25	Santa Clara
C	7	Kristaps Porziņģis	7 ft 2 in (2.18 m)	240 lb (109 kg)	1995-08-02	Latvia
C	21	Quinten Post	7 ft 0 in (2.13 m)	238 lb (108 kg)	2000-03-21	Boston College
G	3	Will Richard	6 ft 3 in (1.91 m)	206 lb (93 kg)	2002-12-24	Florida
F	15	Gui Santos	6 ft 7 in (2.01 m)	185 lb (84 kg)	2002-06-22	Brazil
G	61	Pat Spencer	6 ft 2 in (1.88 m)	205 lb (93 kg)	1996-07-04	Northwestern
G	19	Nate Williams (TW)	6 ft 5 in (1.96 m)	205 lb (93 kg)	1999-02-12	Buffalo

Coaches
Head coach
- Steve Kerr
Assistant(s)
- Ron Adams
- Seth Cooper
- Bruce Fraser
- Nick Kerr
- Khalid Robinson
- Jacob Rubin
- Jerry Stackhouse
- Terry Stotts
- Anthony Vereen
- Kris Weems
- Drew Yoder

Legend
- (DP) Unsigned draft pick
- (FA) Free agent
- (S) Suspended
- (GL) On assignment to G League affiliate
- (TW) Two-way affiliate player
- Injured

Roster
Updated: April 5, 2026

== Standings ==
=== Division ===
Pacific Division	W	L	PCT	GB	Home	Road	Div	GP
y – Los Angeles Lakers	53	29	.646	–	28‍–‍13	25‍–‍16	9‍–‍7	82
x – Phoenix Suns	45	37	.549	8.0	25‍–‍16	20‍–‍21	10‍–‍6	82
pi – Los Angeles Clippers	42	40	.512	11.0	23‍–‍18	19‍–‍22	10‍–‍6	82
pi – Golden State Warriors	37	45	.451	16.0	22‍–‍19	15‍–‍26	7‍–‍9	82
Sacramento Kings	22	60	.268	31.0	15‍–‍26	7‍–‍34	4‍–‍12	82

=== Conference ===
Western Conference
#	Team	W	L	PCT	GB	GP
1	z – Oklahoma City Thunder *	64	18	.780	–	82
2	y – San Antonio Spurs *	62	20	.756	2.0	82
3	x – Denver Nuggets	54	28	.659	10.0	82
4	y – Los Angeles Lakers *	53	29	.646	11.0	82
5	x – Houston Rockets	52	30	.634	12.0	82
6	x – Minnesota Timberwolves	49	33	.598	15.0	82
7	x – Phoenix Suns	45	37	.549	19.0	82
8	x – Portland Trail Blazers	42	40	.512	22.0	82
9	pi – Los Angeles Clippers	42	40	.512	22.0	82
10	pi – Golden State Warriors	37	45	.451	27.0	82
11	New Orleans Pelicans	26	56	.317	38.0	82
12	Dallas Mavericks	26	56	.317	38.0	82
13	Memphis Grizzlies	25	57	.305	39.0	82
14	Sacramento Kings	22	60	.268	42.0	82
15	Utah Jazz	22	60	.268	42.0	82

== Game log ==
=== Preseason ===
2025 preseason game log
Total: 3–2 (Home: 2–1; Road: 1–1)
Preseason: 3–2 (home: 2–1; road: 1–1)

Game	Date	Team	Score	High points	High rebounds	High assists	Location Attendance	Record
1	October 5	L.A. Lakers	W 111–103	Moses Moody (19)	Jonathan Kuminga (6)	Draymond Green (5)	Chase Center; 18,064	1–0
2	October 8	Portland	W 129–123	Quinten Post (20)	Jackson-Davis, Kuminga (5)	Curry, Jackson-Davis, Podziemski, Spencer (3)	Chase Center; 18,064	2–0
3	October 12	@ L.A. Lakers	L 116–126	Brandin Podziemski (23)	Trayce Jackson-Davis (7)	Brandin Podziemski (8)	Crypto.com Arena; 17,382	2–1
4	October 14	@ Portland	W 118–111	Stephen Curry (28)	Trayce Jackson-Davis (10)	Stephen Curry (5)	Moda Center; 16,262	3–1
5	October 17	L.A. Clippers	W 106–103	Stephen Curry (20)	Green, Spencer (5)	Pat Spencer (6)	Chase Center; 18,064	3–2

2025–26 preseason schedule

=== Regular season ===
2025–26 game log
Total: 37–45 (Home: 22–19; Road: 15–26)
October: 4–2 (home: 3–0; road: 1–2)

Game	Date	Team	Score	High points	High rebounds	High assists	Location Attendance	Record
1	October 21	@ L.A. Lakers	W 119–109	Jimmy Butler III (31)	Jonathan Kuminga (9)	Draymond Green (9)	Crypto.com Arena; 18,997	1–0
2	October 23	Denver	W 137–131 (OT)	Stephen Curry (42)	Draymond Green (8)	Draymond Green (8)	Chase Center; 18,064	2–0
3	October 24	@ Portland	L 119–139	Stephen Curry (35)	Jonathan Kuminga (8)	Draymond Green (5)	Moda Center; 18,090	2–1
4	October 27	Memphis	W 131–118	Jonathan Kuminga (25)	Jonathan Kuminga (10)	Draymond Green (10)	Chase Center; 18,064	3–1
5	October 28	L.A. Clippers	W 98–79	Jimmy Butler III (21)	Quinten Post (8)	Stephen Curry (8)	Chase Center; 18,064	4–1
6	October 30	@ Milwaukee	L 110–120	Stephen Curry (27)	Jimmy Butler III (11)	Draymond Green (6)	Fiserv Forum; 17,341	4–2

November: 7–8 (home: 4–2; road: 3–6)

Game	Date	Team	Score	High points	High rebounds	High assists	Location Attendance	Record
7	November 1	@ Indiana	L 109–114	Stephen Curry (24)	Draymond Green (10)	Jimmy Butler III (7)	Gainbridge Fieldhouse; 17,274	4–3
8	November 4	Phoenix	W 118–107	Stephen Curry (28)	Green, Post (6)	Draymond Green (8)	Chase Center; 18,064	5–3
9	November 5	@ Sacramento	L 116–121	Will Richard (30)	Kuminga, Podziemski (9)	Brandin Podziemski (9)	Golden 1 Center; 17,832	5–4
10	November 7	@ Denver	L 104–129	Draymond Green (17)	Jackson-Davis, Kuminga (7)	Pat Spencer (5)	Ball Arena; 19,969	5–5
11	November 9	Indiana	W 114–83	Jimmy Butler III (21)	Jimmy Butler III (9)	Jimmy Butler III (7)	Chase Center; 18,064	6–5
12	November 11	@ Oklahoma City	L 102–126	Jonathan Kuminga (13)	Jackson-Davis, Payton II (6)	Green, Hield, Kuminga (4)	Paycom Center; 18,203	6–6
13	November 12	@ San Antonio	W 125–120	Stephen Curry (46)	Tied (6)	Jimmy Butler III (8)	Frost Bank Center; 18,578	7–6
14	November 14	@ San Antonio	W 109–108	Stephen Curry (49)	Butler III, Green (8)	Draymond Green (8)	Frost Bank Center; 19,059	8–6
15	November 16	@ New Orleans	W 124–106	Moses Moody (32)	Draymond Green (10)	Jimmy Butler III (10)	Smoothie King Center; 18,373	9–6
16	November 18	@ Orlando	L 113–121	Stephen Curry (34)	Jimmy Butler III (7)	Stephen Curry (9)	Kia Center; 18,846	9–7
17	November 19	@ Miami	L 96–110	Brandin Podziemski (20)	Trayce Jackson-Davis (11)	Pat Spencer (13)	Kaseya Center; 19,600	9–8
18	November 21	Portland	L 123–127	Stephen Curry (38)	Jimmy Butler III (8)	Draymond Green (7)	Chase Center; 18,064	9–9
19	November 24	Utah	W 134–117	Stephen Curry (31)	Tied (6)	Gary Payton II (8)	Chase Center; 18,064	10–9
20	November 26	Houston	L 100–104	Jimmy Butler III (21)	Draymond Green (9)	Draymond Green (8)	Chase Center; 18,064	10–10
21	November 29	New Orleans	W 104–96	Jimmy Butler III (24)	Gary Payton II (11)	Jimmy Butler III (10)	Chase Center; 18,064	11–10

December: 7–6 (home: 3–2; road: 4–4)

Game	Date	Team	Score	High points	High rebounds	High assists	Location Attendance	Record
22	December 2	Oklahoma City	L 112–124	Podziemski, Spencer (17)	Draymond Green (9)	Pat Spencer (6)	Chase Center; 18,064	11–11
23	December 4	@ Philadelphia	L 98–99	Pat Spencer (16)	Buddy Hield (8)	Horford, Post, Spencer (4)	Xfinity Mobile Arena; 18,221	11–12
24	December 6	@ Cleveland	W 99–94	Pat Spencer (19)	Quinten Post (9)	Pat Spencer (7)	Rocket Arena; 19,432	12–12
25	December 7	@ Chicago	W 123–91	Brandin Podziemski (21)	Butler III, Podziemski (8)	Brandin Podziemski (7)	United Center; 18,449	13–12
26	December 12	Minnesota	L 120–127	Stephen Curry (39)	Jimmy Butler III (8)	Butler III, Curry (5)	Chase Center; 18,064	13–13
27	December 14	@ Portland	L 131–136	Stephen Curry (48)	Draymond Green (8)	Draymond Green (7)	Moda Center; 19,064	13–14
28	December 18	@ Phoenix	L 98–99	Jimmy Butler III (31)	Quinten Post (11)	Stephen Curry (7)	Mortgage Matchup Center; 17,071	13–15
29	December 20	Phoenix	W 119–116	Stephen Curry (28)	Stephen Curry (9)	Curry, Podziemski (6)	Chase Center; 18,064	14–15
30	December 22	Orlando	W 120–97	Stephen Curry (26)	Quinten Post (12)	Stephen Curry (6)	Chase Center; 18,064	15–15
31	December 25	Dallas	W 126–116	Stephen Curry (23)	Jimmy Butler III (9)	Jimmy Butler III (9)	Chase Center; 18,064	16–15
32	December 28	@ Toronto	L 127–141 (OT)	Stephen Curry (39)	Horford, Richard (7)	Draymond Green (7)	Scotiabank Arena; 19,800	16–16
33	December 29	@ Brooklyn	W 120–107	Stephen Curry (27)	De'Anthony Melton (8)	Stephen Curry (5)	Barclays Center; 18,163	17–16
34	December 31	@ Charlotte	W 132–125	Stephen Curry (26)	Draymond Green (8)	Draymond Green (12)	Spectrum Center; 19,685	18–16

January: 9–7 (home: 7–4; road: 2–3)

Game	Date	Team	Score	High points	High rebounds	High assists	Location Attendance	Record
35	January 2	Oklahoma City	L 94–131	Tied (13)	Trayce Jackson-Davis (9)	Pat Spencer (11)	Chase Center; 18,064	18–17
36	January 3	Utah	W 123–114	Stephen Curry (31)	Gary Payton II (8)	Brandin Podziemski (8)	Chase Center; 18,064	19–17
37	January 5	@ L.A. Clippers	L 102–103	Stephen Curry (27)	Jimmy Butler III (6)	Draymond Green (12)	Intuit Dome; 17,927	19–18
38	January 7	Milwaukee	W 120–113	Stephen Curry (31)	Al Horford (10)	Curry, Green (7)	Chase Center; 18,064	20–18
39	January 9	Sacramento	W 137–103	Stephen Curry (27)	Gary Payton II (9)	Stephen Curry (10)	Chase Center; 18,064	21–18
40	January 11	Atlanta	L 111–124	Stephen Curry (31)	Draymond Green (9)	Jimmy Butler III (6)	Chase Center; 18,064	21–19
41	January 13	Portland	W 119–97	De'Anthony Melton (23)	Draymond Green (7)	Stephen Curry (11)	Chase Center; 18,064	22–19
42	January 15	New York	W 126–113	Jimmy Butler III (32)	Jimmy Butler III (8)	Stephen Curry (7)	Chase Center; 18,064	23–19
43	January 17	Charlotte	W 136–116	De'Anthony Melton (24)	Quinten Post (7)	Brandin Podziemski (7)	Chase Center; 18,064	24–19
44	January 19	Miami	W 135–112	Brandin Podziemski (24)	Quinten Post (9)	Stephen Curry (11)	Chase Center; 18,064	25–19
45	January 20	Toronto	L 127–145	Buddy Hield (25)	Quinten Post (7)	Tied (5)	Chase Center; 18,064	25–20
46	January 22	@ Dallas	L 115–123	Stephen Curry (38)	Al Horford (8)	Brandin Podziemski (10)	American Airlines Center; 19,432	25–21
—	January 24	@ Minnesota	Postponed due to the killing of Alex Pretti in Minneapolis. Makeup date January 25.					
47	January 25	@ Minnesota	W 111–85	Stephen Curry (26)	Moses Moody (8)	Stephen Curry (7)	Target Center; 18,978	26–21
48	January 26	@ Minnesota	L 83–108	Quinten Post (13)	Gui Santos (10)	Pat Spencer (6)	Target Center; 18,978	26–22
49	January 28	@ Utah	W 140–124	Stephen Curry (27)	Brandin Podziemski (8)	Al Horford (8)	Delta Center; 18,186	27–22
50	January 30	Detroit	L 124–131	Stephen Curry (23)	Brandin Podziemski (8)	Brandin Podziemski (8)	Chase Center; 18,064	27–23

February: 4–6 (home: 2–4; road: 2–2)

Game	Date	Team	Score	High points	High rebounds	High assists	Location Attendance	Record
51	February 3	Philadelphia	L 94–113	Santos, Spencer (13)	Draymond Green (7)	De'Anthony Melton (6)	Chase Center; 18,064	27–24
52	February 5	@ Phoenix	W 101–97	Pat Spencer (20)	Moody, Payton II (8)	Gui Santos (7)	Mortgage Matchup Center; 17,071	28–24
53	February 7	@ L.A. Lakers	L 99–105	Moses Moody (25)	Gui Santos (8)	Pat Spencer (7)	Crypto.com Arena; 18,997	28–25
54	February 9	Memphis	W 114–113	Pat Spencer (17)	Al Horford (9)	Pat Spencer (7)	Chase Center; 18,064	29–25
55	February 11	San Antonio	L 113–126	Tied (17)	Draymond Green (12)	Draymond Green (8)	Chase Center; 18,064	29–26
All-Star Game
56	February 19	Boston	L 110–121	De'Anthony Melton (18)	Al Horford (8)	Pat Spencer (7)	Chase Center; 18,064	29–27
57	February 22	Denver	W 128–117	Moses Moody (23)	Brandin Podziemski (15)	Brandin Podziemski (9)	Chase Center; 18,064	30–27
58	February 24	@ New Orleans	L 109–113	De'Anthony Melton (28)	Brandin Podziemski (15)	Draymond Green (6)	Smoothie King Center; 16,481	30–28
59	February 25	@ Memphis	W 133–112	Will Richard (21)	Tied (8)	Pat Spencer (9)	FedExForum; 15,689	31–28
60	February 28	L.A. Lakers	L 101–129	Gui Santos (14)	Podziemski, Post (7)	Green, Podziemski (6)	Chase Center; 18,064	31–29

March: 5–10 (home: 2–3; road: 3–7)

Game	Date	Team	Score	High points	High rebounds	High assists	Location Attendance	Record
61	March 2	L.A. Clippers	L 101–114	Brandin Podziemski (22)	Gui Santos (10)	Draymond Green (6)	Chase Center; 18,064	31–30
62	March 5	@ Houston	W 115–113 (OT)	Brandin Podziemski (26)	Brandin Podziemski (9)	Draymond Green (8)	Toyota Center; 18,055	32–30
63	March 7	@ Oklahoma City	L 97–104	Gui Santos (22)	Gary Payton II (12)	Brandin Podziemski (6)	Paycom Center; 18,203	32–31
64	March 9	@ Utah	L 116–119	De'Anthony Melton (22)	Podziemski, Santos (8)	Draymond Green (11)	Delta Center; 18,186	32–32
65	March 10	Chicago	L 124–130	Tied (17)	Gary Payton II (11)	Brandin Podziemski (7)	Chase Center; 18,064	32–33
66	March 13	Minnesota	L 117–127	Brandin Podziemski (25)	Brandin Podziemski (10)	Gui Santos (8)	Chase Center; 18,064	32–34
67	March 15	@ New York	L 101–107	Brandin Podziemski (25)	Gui Santos (7)	Gui Santos (7)	Madison Square Garden; 19,812	32–35
68	March 16	@ Washington	W 125–117	Kristaps Porziņģis (30)	Draymond Green (8)	Draymond Green (7)	Capital One Arena; 15,922	33–35
69	March 18	@ Boston	L 99–120	Payton II, Spencer (14)	Payton II, Podziemski (6)	Green, Podziemski (5)	TD Garden; 19,156	33–36
70	March 20	@ Detroit	L 101–115	Brandin Podziemski (15)	Podziemski, Yurtseven (6)	Draymond Green (6)	Little Caesars Arena; 20,062	33–37
71	March 21	@ Atlanta	L 110–126	De'Anthony Melton (20)	Draymond Green (6)	Gui Santos (6)	State Farm Arena; 17,069	33–38
72	March 23	@ Dallas	W 137–131 (OT)	Moses Moody (23)	Brandin Podziemski (10)	Green, Podziemski (6)	American Airlines Center; 18,821	34–38
73	March 25	Brooklyn	W 109–106	Gui Santos (31)	De'Anthony Melton (9)	Brandin Podziemski (5)	Chase Center; 18,064	35–38
74	March 27	Washington	W 131–126	Kristaps Porziņģis (28)	Brandin Podziemski (10)	Draymond Green (10)	Chase Center; 18,064	36–38
75	March 29	@ Denver	L 93–116	Podziemski, Porziņģis (23)	Gui Santos (10)	Green, Spencer (8)	Ball Arena; 19,588	36–39

April: 1–6 (home: 1–4; road: 0–2)

Game	Date	Team	Score	High points	High rebounds	High assists	Location Attendance	Record
76	April 1	San Antonio	L 113–127	Nate Williams (18)	Spencer, Yurtseven (8)	Pat Spencer (7)	Chase Center; 18,064	36–40
77	April 2	Cleveland	L 111–118	Podziemski, Santos (25)	Gary Payton II (12)	Draymond Green (9)	Chase Center; 18,064	36–41
78	April 5	Houston	L 116–117	Stephen Curry (29)	Kristaps Porziņģis (8)	Draymond Green (12)	Chase Center; 18,064	36–42
79	April 7	Sacramento	W 110–105	De'Anthony Melton (21)	Charles Bassey (12)	Draymond Green (7)	Chase Center; 18,064	37–42
80	April 9	L.A. Lakers	L 103–119	Podziemski, Williams (17)	Charles Bassey (13)	Green, Spencer (6)	Chase Center; 18,064	37–43
81	April 10	@ Sacramento	L 118–124	Brandin Podziemski (30)	Kristaps Porziņģis (7)	Green, Santos (6)	Golden 1 Center; 18,175	37–44
82	April 12	@ L.A. Clippers	L 110–115	Stephen Curry (24)	Kristaps Porziņģis (8)	Curry, Spencer (3)	Intuit Dome; 17,927	37–45

2025–26 season schedule

=== Play-in ===
2026 play-in game log
Total: 1–1 (Home: 0–0; Road: 1–1)
Play-in: 1–1 (home: 0–0; road: 1–1)

Game	Date	Team	Score	High points	High rebounds	High assists	Location Attendance	Record
1	April 15	@ L.A. Clippers	W 126–121	Stephen Curry (35)	Brandin Podziemski (7)	Draymond Green (9)	Intuit Dome; 17,927	1–0
2	April 17	@ Phoenix	L 96–111	Brandin Podziemski (23)	Brandin Podziemski (10)	Draymond Green (6)	Mortgage Matchup Center; 17,071	1–1

2025–26 season schedule

=== NBA Cup ===
==== West Group C ====
Pos	Team	Pld	W	L	PF	PA	PD	Qualification
1	San Antonio Spurs	4	3	1	483	457	+26	Advanced to knockout rounds
2	Denver Nuggets	4	2	2	484	461	+23	
3	Houston Rockets	4	2	2	463	449	+14	
4	Portland Trail Blazers	4	2	2	454	485	−31	
5	Golden State Warriors	4	1	3	436	468	−32	

Source: NBA

== Player statistics ==
Legend
GP	Games played	GS	Games started	MPG	Minutes per game
FG%	Field-goal percentage	3P%	3-point field-goal percentage	FT%	Free-throw percentage
RPG	Rebounds per game	APG	Assists per game	SPG	Steals per game
BPG	Blocks per game	PPG	Points per game

=== Regular season ===
Golden State Warriors statistics
Player	GP	GS	MPG	FG%	3P%	FT%	RPG	APG	SPG	BPG	PPG
Charles Bassey^{†}	5	0	20.0	.677	–	.846	7.2	1.0	.4	1.4	10.6
Jimmy Butler III	38	38	31.1	.519	.376	.864	5.6	4.9	1.4	.2	20.0
LJ Cryer	18	1	16.2	.402	.394	.895	1.6	1.0	.2	.0	8.2
Seth Curry	10	0	13.3	.490	.480	.917	1.2	1.0	.3	.0	7.1
Stephen Curry	43	41	30.9	.468	.393	.923	3.6	4.7	1.1	.4	26.6
Draymond Green	68	68	27.5	.418	.326	.702	5.5	5.5	.9	.6	8.4
Buddy Hield^{†}	44	3	17.5	.433	.344	.794	2.5	1.5	.8	.2	8.0
Al Horford	45	13	21.5	.426	.361	.846	4.9	2.6	.7	1.1	8.3
Trayce Jackson-Davis^{†}	36	1	11.4	.588	1.000	.558	3.1	.9	.4	.5	4.2
Jonathan Kuminga^{†}	20	13	23.8	.454	.321	.742	5.9	2.5	.4	.3	12.1
Malevy Leons	25	2	11.0	.444	.250	.789	2.1	.9	.6	.4	3.3
De'Anthony Melton	49	24	23.0	.407	.294	.826	3.2	2.6	1.6	.4	12.3
Moses Moody	60	49	25.7	.440	.401	.770	3.3	1.6	1.0	.6	12.1
Gary Payton II	73	1	15.6	.583	.291	.650	3.6	1.7	.9	.3	7.5
Brandin Podziemski	82	43	28.5	.455	.371	.797	5.1	3.7	1.1	.2	13.8
Kristaps Porziņģis^{†}	15	11	23.7	.433	.311	.844	5.3	2.3	.6	1.1	16.1
Quinten Post	67	35	17.3	.440	.336	.791	4.0	1.4	.4	.5	7.7
Will Richard	69	21	20.0	.468	.335	.852	2.5	1.3	1.2	.1	6.4
Gui Santos	68	30	20.5	.500	.351	.725	3.9	2.3	.9	.3	9.2
Pat Spencer	66	14	18.6	.427	.357	.772	2.4	3.5	.7	.1	7.2
Nate Williams	14	2	17.1	.489	.433	.867	2.1	1.0	.4	.0	8.0
Ömer Yurtseven	9	0	11.6	.423	.000	.667	3.3	.9	.2	.1	3.8

- ^{†} Denotes player spent time with another team in the season. Stats reflect time with the Warriors only.

== Transactions ==
=== Trades ===
Date	Trade		Ref.
July 6, 2025	To Memphis Grizzlies: Draft rights to Justinian Jessup (2020 No. 51); Draft rights to Jahmai Mashack (No. 59); 2032 protected second-round pick (from Golden State) (Note: Memphis will receive the pick if it's No. 51–60.)	To Golden State Warriors: Draft rights to Will Richard (No. 56)	
July 6, 2025	Seven-team trade		
July 6, 2025	To Atlanta Hawks: David Roddy (two-way contract); 2031 second-round pick swap (Note: Atlanta may swap their own pick for Houston's pick.); Cash considerations	To Los Angeles Lakers: Draft rights to Adou Thiero (No. 36)	
July 6, 2025	To Brooklyn Nets: 2026 second-round pick (Note: The second-most favorable of the picks originally belonging to Boston, Indiana, Los Angeles, and Miami.); 2030 second-round pick (from Boston)	To Houston Rockets: Kevin Durant; Clint Capela (sign-and-trade)	
July 6, 2025	To Phoenix Suns: Jalen Green; Dillon Brooks; Daeqwon Plowden (two-way contract); Draft rights to Khaman Maluach (No. 10); Draft rights to Rasheer Fleming (No. 31); Draft rights to Koby Brea (No. 41); 2026 second-round pick (Note: The second-most favorable of the picks originally belonging to Dallas, Oklahoma City, and Philadelphia.); Least favorable 2032 second-round pick between Houston and Minnesota	To Minnesota Timberwolves: Draft rights to Rocco Zikarsky (No. 45); 2026 second-round pick (Note: The less favorable of the picks originally belonging to Denver and Golden State.); 2032 second-round pick (Note: The less favorable of the picks originally belonging to Houston and Phoenix.); Cash considerations	
July 6, 2025	To Golden State Warriors: Draft rights to Alex Toohey (No. 52); Draft rights to Jahmai Mashack (No. 59) (Note: Golden State flipped Jahmai Mashack's rights to Memphis in a separate trade.)		
February 5, 2026	To Atlanta Hawks: Buddy Hield; Jonathan Kuminga	To Golden State Warriors: Kristaps Porziņģis	
February 5, 2026	To Golden State Warriors: 2026 second-round pick (from LA Lakers)	To Toronto Raptors: Trayce Jackson-Davis	

=== Free agency ===
==== Re-signed ====
Date	Player	Ref.
September 29, 2025	(United States) Gary Payton II	
September 29, 2025	(United States) Pat Spencer	
September 30, 2025	(Democratic Republic of the Congo) Jonathan Kuminga	

==== Additions ====
Date	Player	Former Team	Ref.
September 29, 2025	(United States) Will Richard	Florida (Sr.)	
September 29, 2025	(Australia) Alex Toohey	Sydney Kings (Australia)	
October 1, 2025	(Dominican Republic) Al Horford	Boston Celtics	
October 1, 2025	(United States) De'Anthony Melton	Brooklyn Nets	
October 1, 2025	(United States) Seth Curry	Charlotte Hornets	
December 1, 2025	(United States) Seth Curry	Charlotte Hornets	
December 2, 2025	(United States) LJ Cryer	Santa Cruz Warriors (NBA G League)	
December 8, 2025	(Netherlands) Malevy Leons	Oklahoma City Blue (NBA G League)	
February 16, 2026	(United States) Nate Williams	Long Island Nets (NBA G League)	
March 15, 2026	(Turkey) Ömer Yurtseven	Rio Grande Valley Vipers (NBA G League)	
March 15, 2026	(Turkey) Ömer Yurtseven	Golden State Warriors	
April 5, 2026	(Nigeria) Charles Bassey	Santa Cruz Warriors (NBA G League)	

==== Subtractions ====
Date	Player	Reason	New team	Ref.
July 7, 2025	(United States) Kevon Looney	Free agency	New Orleans Pelicans	
October 10, 2025	(Australia) Taran Armstrong	Free agency	Dubai Basketball (United Arab Emirates)	
October 18, 2025	(United States) Seth Curry	Waived	Golden State Warriors	
October 25, 2025	(United States) Braxton Key	Free agency	Valencia (Spain)	
November 1, 2025	(United States) Kevin Knox II	Free agency	Windy City Bulls (NBA G League)	
December 8, 2025	(Australia) Alex Toohey	Waived	—N/a	
December 17, 2025	(Canada) Jackson Rowe	Waived	Ironi Ness Ziona (Israel)	
