= 2025–26 Los Angeles Lakers season =

- Division champions
- Head coach: JJ Redick
- President: Jeanie Buss; Rob Pelinka (vice)
- General manager: Rob Pelinka
- Owners: Mark Walter (majority); Jeanie Buss (controlling owner); Todd Boehly, Edward P. Roski, and Patrick Soon-Shiong (minority)
- Arena: Crypto.com Arena

Results
- Record: 53–29 (.646)
- Place: Division: 1st (Pacific); Conference: 4th (Western)
- Playoff finish: Conference semifinals (Lost to Thunder 0–4)
- Stats at Basketball Reference

Local media
- Television: Spectrum SportsNet
- Radio: ESPN LA 710 (English); 1020 Radio AM (Spanish)

The 2025–26 Los Angeles Lakers season was the 79th season of the franchise, its 78th season in the National Basketball Association (NBA), its 66th season in Los Angeles, and its 27th season playing home games at Crypto.com Arena.

The Lakers advanced to the 2025 NBA Cup knockout stage as the winner of West Group B, having finished the group stage with an undefeated 4–0 record. However, they were eliminated by the eventual Cup runners-up San Antonio Spurs in the quarterfinals.

On March 31, the Lakers clinched the playoffs for the fourth consecutive season and their second consecutive Pacific Division title following a win by the Orlando Magic over the Phoenix Suns. They also won 50 games in back-to-back seasons for the first time since 2009–10 and 2010–11. On April 9, the Lakers improved on their 50–32 record from the previous season with a win over the Golden State Warriors. For the second season in a row, the Lakers have home-court advantage in the first round. However, Luka Dončić sustained a left hamstring strain during a game against the Oklahoma City Thunder, sidelining him beginning on April 2.

The Lakers finished the regular season with a 53–29 record, ranking fourth in the Western Conference. They faced the Houston Rockets in the first round in a rematch of the 2020 Semifinals, in which the Lakers defeated the Rockets in five games en route to their 17th championship. Los Angeles defeated Houston in six games of the first round, but were later swept by the top-seeded (and defending NBA champion) Oklahoma City Thunder in the Western Conference Semifinals, ending their season.

This was the last season for public address announcer Lawrence Tanter, who retired from the role, but stayed on as an adviser on the Lakers' game presentation. This would also be the end of LeBron James 's tenure with the Lakers, as he announced on social media that he would return for the 2026-27 NBA season but with a different team (which would turn out to be the Philadelphia 76ers). Lastly, this was the only season where Mark Walter and TWG Global would officially be named the primary owners of the team, as they were sold off in August 2026 to Bob Iger and Joshua Kushner.

== Draft picks ==
Round	Pick	Player	Position	Nationality	College / Club
2	55	Lachlan Olbrich	PF	Australia	Illawarra Hawks (Australia)

The Lakers entered the draft with only one second-round selection. They traded their original first-round pick, along with a second-round pick acquired from the Los Angeles Clippers through separate transactions involving star players with the New Orleans Pelicans and Utah Jazz, respectively. Throughout the process, the Lakers retained their own second-round pick.

== Roster ==
2025–26 Los Angeles Lakers roster
Players

Pos.	No.	Player	Height	Weight	DOB	From
C	5	Deandre Ayton	7 ft 0 in (2.13 m)	252 lb (114 kg)	1998-07-23	Arizona
G	77	Luka Dončić (injured)	6 ft 8 in (2.03 m)	230 lb (104 kg)	1999-02-28	Slovenia
F	28	Rui Hachimura	6 ft 8 in (2.03 m)	230 lb (104 kg)	1998-02-08	Gonzaga
C	11	Jaxson Hayes	7 ft 0 in (2.13 m)	220 lb (100 kg)	2000-05-23	Texas
G	9	Bronny James	6 ft 2 in (1.88 m)	210 lb (95 kg)	2004-10-06	USC
F	23	LeBron James	6 ft 9 in (2.06 m)	250 lb (113 kg)	1984-12-30	St. Vincent–St. Mary HS (OH)
G/F	10	Luke Kennard	6 ft 5 in (1.96 m)	206 lb (93 kg)	1996-06-24	Duke
F/C	14	Maxi Kleber	6 ft 10 in (2.08 m)	240 lb (109 kg)	1992-01-29	Germany
G/F	4	Dalton Knecht	6 ft 6 in (1.98 m)	215 lb (98 kg)	2001-04-19	Tennessee
F	12	Jake LaRavia	6 ft 7 in (2.01 m)	235 lb (107 kg)	2001-11-03	Wake Forest
G	30	Chris Mañon (TW)	6 ft 4 in (1.93 m)	209 lb (95 kg)	2001-12-09	Vanderbilt
G	15	Austin Reaves	6 ft 5 in (1.96 m)	197 lb (89 kg)	1998-05-29	Oklahoma
G	36	Marcus Smart	6 ft 3 in (1.91 m)	220 lb (100 kg)	1994-03-06	Oklahoma State
G	20	Nick Smith Jr.	6 ft 2 in (1.88 m)	185 lb (84 kg)	2004-04-18	Arkansas
F	1	Adou Thiero	6 ft 7 in (2.01 m)	220 lb (100 kg)	2004-05-08	Arkansas
F/C	17	Drew Timme (TW)	6 ft 9 in (2.06 m)	235 lb (107 kg)	2000-09-09	Gonzaga
F	2	Jarred Vanderbilt	6 ft 8 in (2.03 m)	214 lb (97 kg)	1999-04-03	Kentucky

Coaches
Head coach
- JJ Redick
Assistant(s)
- Bob Beyer
- Scott Brooks
- Lindsey Harding
- Beau Levesque
- Nate McMillan
- Greg St. Jean

Legend
- (DP) Unsigned draft pick
- (FA) Free agent
- (S) Suspended
- (GL) On assignment to G League affiliate
- (TW) Two-way affiliate player
- (L) On leave from the team
- Injured

Roster
Updated: April 12, 2026

== Standings ==
=== Division ===
Pacific Division	W	L	PCT	GB	Home	Road	Div	GP
y – Los Angeles Lakers	53	29	.646	–	28‍–‍13	25‍–‍16	9‍–‍7	82
x – Phoenix Suns	45	37	.549	8.0	25‍–‍16	20‍–‍21	10‍–‍6	82
pi – Los Angeles Clippers	42	40	.512	11.0	23‍–‍18	19‍–‍22	10‍–‍6	82
pi – Golden State Warriors	37	45	.451	16.0	22‍–‍19	15‍–‍26	7‍–‍9	82
Sacramento Kings	22	60	.268	31.0	15‍–‍26	7‍–‍34	4‍–‍12	82

=== Conference ===
Western Conference
#	Team	W	L	PCT	GB	GP
1	z – Oklahoma City Thunder *	64	18	.780	–	82
2	y – San Antonio Spurs *	62	20	.756	2.0	82
3	x – Denver Nuggets	54	28	.659	10.0	82
4	y – Los Angeles Lakers *	53	29	.646	11.0	82
5	x – Houston Rockets	52	30	.634	12.0	82
6	x – Minnesota Timberwolves	49	33	.598	15.0	82
7	x – Phoenix Suns	45	37	.549	19.0	82
8	x – Portland Trail Blazers	42	40	.512	22.0	82
9	pi – Los Angeles Clippers	42	40	.512	22.0	82
10	pi – Golden State Warriors	37	45	.451	27.0	82
11	New Orleans Pelicans	26	56	.317	38.0	82
12	Dallas Mavericks	26	56	.317	38.0	82
13	Memphis Grizzlies	25	57	.305	39.0	82
14	Sacramento Kings	22	60	.268	42.0	82
15	Utah Jazz	22	60	.268	42.0	82

== Game log ==
=== Preseason ===
2025 preseason game log
Total: 1–5 (Home: 1–3; Road: 0–2)
Preseason: 1–5 (home: 1–3; road: 0–2)

Game	Date	Team	Score	High points	High rebounds	High assists	Location Attendance	Record
1	October 3	Phoenix	L 81–103	Austin Reaves (20)	Deandre Ayton (8)	James, Reaves (2)	Acrisure Arena; 9,122	0–1
2	October 5	@ Golden State	L 103–111	Gabe Vincent (16)	Ayton, Vanderbilt (7)	Gabe Vincent (5)	Chase Center; 18,064	0–2
3	October 12	Golden State	W 126–116	Austin Reaves (21)	Deandre Ayton (8)	Ayton, LaRavia (5)	Crypto.com Arena; 17,382	1–2
4	October 14	@ Phoenix	L 104–113	Dončić, Reaves (25)	Deandre Ayton (13)	Luka Dončić (4)	Mortgage Matchup Center; 17,071	1–3
5	October 15	Dallas	L 94–121	Gabe Vincent (22)	Jaxson Hayes (10)	Dalton Knecht (7)	T-Mobile Arena; 12,770	1–4
6	October 17	Sacramento	L 116–117	Luka Dončić (31)	Deandre Ayton (9)	Luka Dončić (9)	Crypto.com Arena; 16,053	1–5

2025–26 preseason schedule

=== Regular season ===
2025–26 game log
Total: 53–29 (Home: 28–13; Road: 25–16)
October: 4–2 (home: 1–2; road: 3–0)

Game	Date	Team	Score	High points	High rebounds	High assists	Location Attendance	Record
1	October 21	Golden State	L 109–119	Luka Dončić (43)	Luka Dončić (12)	Dončić, Reaves (9)	Crypto.com Arena; 18,997	0–1
2	October 24	Minnesota	W 128–110	Luka Dončić (49)	Luka Dončić (11)	Austin Reaves (11)	Crypto.com Arena; 18,642	1–1
3	October 26	@ Sacramento	W 127–120	Austin Reaves (51)	Deandre Ayton (15)	Austin Reaves (9)	Golden 1 Center; 17,832	2–1
4	October 27	Portland	L 108–122	Austin Reaves (41)	Ayton, Vanderbilt (8)	LaRavia, Reaves (5)	Crypto.com Arena; 18,512	2–2
5	October 29	@ Minnesota	W 116–115	Austin Reaves (28)	Jarred Vanderbilt (12)	Austin Reaves (16)	Target Center; 15,308	3–2
6	October 31	@ Memphis	W 117–112	Luka Dončić (44)	Luka Dončić (12)	Luka Dončić (6)	FedExForum; 16,122	4–2

November: 11–2 (home: 6–0; road: 5–2)

Game	Date	Team	Score	High points	High rebounds	High assists	Location Attendance	Record
7	November 2	Miami	W 130–120	Luka Dončić (29)	Luka Dončić (11)	Austin Reaves (11)	Crypto.com Arena; 18,831	5–2
8	November 3	@ Portland	W 123–115	Deandre Ayton (29)	Deandre Ayton (10)	Tied (6)	Moda Center; 17,083	6–2
9	November 5	San Antonio	W 118–116	Luka Dončić (35)	Deandre Ayton (10)	Luka Dončić (13)	Crypto.com Arena; 18,997	7–2
10	November 8	@ Atlanta	L 102–122	Luka Dončić (22)	Jarred Vanderbilt (18)	Luka Dončić (11)	State Farm Arena; 17,194	7–3
11	November 10	@ Charlotte	W 121–111	Luka Dončić (38)	Ayton, Dončić (6)	Dončić, Reaves (7)	Spectrum Center; 19,537	8–3
12	November 12	@ Oklahoma City	L 92–121	Luka Dončić (19)	Jarred Vanderbilt (10)	Luka Dončić (7)	Paycom Center; 18,203	8–4
13	November 14	@ New Orleans	W 118–104	Austin Reaves (31)	Deandre Ayton (16)	Luka Dončić (12)	Smoothie King Center; 18,102	9–4
14	November 15	@ Milwaukee	W 119–95	Luka Dončić (41)	Deandre Ayton (10)	Austin Reaves (8)	Fiserv Forum; 17,341	10–4
15	November 18	Utah	W 140–126	Luka Dončić (37)	Deandre Ayton (14)	LeBron James (12)	Crypto.com Arena; 18,997	11–4
16	November 23	@ Utah	W 108–106	Luka Dončić (33)	Luka Dončić (11)	Dončić, James (8)	Delta Center; 18,186	12–4
17	November 25	L.A. Clippers	W 135–118	Luka Dončić (43)	Reaves, Dončić (9)	Luka Dončić (13)	Crypto.com Arena; 18,997	13–4
18	November 28	Dallas	W 129–119	Austin Reaves (38)	Ayton, Reaves (8)	Luka Dončić (11)	Crypto.com Arena; 19,600	14–4
19	November 30	New Orleans	W 133–121	Luka Dončić (34)	Ayton, Dončić (12)	Austin Reaves (8)	Crypto.com Arena; 18,824	15–4

December: 5–7 (home: 1–4; road: 4–3)

Game	Date	Team	Score	High points	High rebounds	High assists	Location Attendance	Record
20	December 1	Phoenix	L 108–125	Luka Dončić (38)	Luka Dončić (11)	Luka Dončić (5)	Crypto.com Arena; 18,997	15–5
21	December 4	@ Toronto	W 123–120	Austin Reaves (44)	Deandre Ayton (8)	LeBron James (11)	Scotiabank Arena; 19,800	16–5
22	December 5	@ Boston	L 105–126	Austin Reaves (36)	Deandre Ayton (10)	Austin Reaves (8)	TD Garden; 19,156	16–6
23	December 7	@ Philadelphia	W 112–108	Luka Dončić (31)	Luka Dončić (15)	Luka Dončić (11)	Xfinity Mobile Arena; 20,431	17–6
24	December 10	San Antonio	L 119–132	Luka Dončić (35)	LeBron James (15)	Dončić, James (8)	Crypto.com Arena; 18,684	17–7
25	December 14	@ Phoenix	W 116–114	Luka Dončić (29)	Deandre Ayton (13)	Dončić, Smart (6)	Mortgage Matchup Center; 17,071	18–7
26	December 18	@ Utah	W 143–135	Luka Dončić (45)	Dončić, Vanderbilt (11)	Luka Dončić (14)	Delta Center; 18,186	19–7
27	December 20	@ L.A. Clippers	L 88–103	LeBron James (36)	Jake LaRavia (11)	Jake LaRavia (6)	Intuit Dome; 17,927	19–8
28	December 23	@ Phoenix	L 108–132	LeBron James (23)	Deandre Ayton (10)	James, Smart (6)	Mortgage Matchup Center; 17,071	19–9
29	December 25	Houston	L 96–119	Luka Dončić (25)	Dončić, Vanderbilt (5)	Luka Dončić (7)	Crypto.com Arena; 18,997	19–10
30	December 28	Sacramento	W 125–101	Luka Dončić (34)	Deandre Ayton (11)	Luka Dončić (7)	Crypto.com Arena; 18,997	20–10
31	December 30	Detroit	L 106–128	Luka Dončić (30)	Jarred Vanderbilt (8)	Luka Dončić (11)	Crypto.com Arena; 18,997	20–11

January: 9–7 (home: 4–2; road: 5–5)

Game	Date	Team	Score	High points	High rebounds	High assists	Location Attendance	Record
32	January 2	Memphis	W 128–121	Luka Dončić (34)	James, LaRavia (9)	Luka Dončić (8)	Crypto.com Arena; 18,997	21–11
33	January 4	Memphis	W 120–114	Luka Dončić (36)	Luka Dončić (9)	LeBron James (10)	Crypto.com Arena; 18,997	22–11
34	January 6	@ New Orleans	W 111–103	Dončić, James (30)	Deandre Ayton (11)	Luka Dončić (10)	Smoothie King Center; 18,227	23–11
35	January 7	@ San Antonio	L 91–107	Luka Dončić (38)	Luka Dončić (10)	Luka Dončić (10)	Frost Bank Center; 19,329	23–12
36	January 9	Milwaukee	L 101–105	LeBron James (26)	Tied (9)	LeBron James (10)	Crypto.com Arena; 18,997	23–13
37	January 12	@ Sacramento	L 112–124	Luka Dončić (42)	Deandre Ayton (13)	Luka Dončić (8)	Golden 1 Center; 17,832	23–14
38	January 13	Atlanta	W 141–116	LeBron James (31)	Deandre Ayton (18)	Luka Dončić (12)	Crypto.com Arena; 18,757	24–14
39	January 15	Charlotte	L 117–135	Luka Dončić (39)	LeBron James (9)	LeBron James (6)	Crypto.com Arena; 18,997	24–15
40	January 17	@ Portland	L 116–132	Marcus Smart (25)	LeBron James (9)	LeBron James (8)	Moda Center; 19,335	24–16
41	January 18	Toronto	W 110–93	Ayton, Dončić (25)	Deandre Ayton (13)	Dončić, James (7)	Crypto.com Arena; 18,997	25–16
42	January 20	@ Denver	W 115–107	Luka Dončić (38)	Luka Dončić (13)	Luka Dončić (10)	Ball Arena; 19,974	26–16
43	January 22	@ L.A. Clippers	L 104–112	Luka Dončić (32)	Luka Dončić (11)	Luka Dončić (8)	Intuit Dome; 17,927	26–17
44	January 24	@ Dallas	W 116–110	Luka Dončić (33)	Deandre Ayton (11)	Luka Dončić (11)	American Airlines Center; 19,880	27–17
45	January 26	@ Chicago	W 129–118	Luka Dončić (46)	Dončić, Vanderbilt (7)	Luka Dončić (12)	United Center; 21,298	28–17
46	January 28	@ Cleveland	L 99–129	Luka Dončić (29)	Jarred Vanderbilt (6)	Luka Dončić (6)	Rocket Arena; 19,432	28–18
47	January 30	@ Washington	W 142–111	Luka Dončić (37)	Deandre Ayton (13)	Luka Dončić (13)	Capital One Arena; 20,028	29–18

February: 6–6 (home: 4–4; road: 2–2)

Game	Date	Team	Score	High points	High rebounds	High assists	Location Attendance	Record
48	February 1	@ New York	L 100–112	Luka Dončić (30)	Luka Dončić (15)	Luka Dončić (8)	Madison Square Garden; 19,812	29–19
49	February 3	@ Brooklyn	W 125–109	LeBron James (25)	Deandre Ayton (8)	LeBron James (7)	Barclays Center; 18,248	30–19
50	February 5	Philadelphia	W 119–115	Austin Reaves (35)	Rui Hachimura (7)	LeBron James (10)	Crypto.com Arena; 18,731	31–19
51	February 7	Golden State	W 105–99	LeBron James (20)	Jarred Vanderbilt (8)	LeBron James (10)	Crypto.com Arena; 18,997	32–19
52	February 9	Oklahoma City	L 110–119	LeBron James (22)	Deandre Ayton (10)	LeBron James (10)	Crypto.com Arena; 18,519	32–20
53	February 10	San Antonio	L 108–136	Kennard, Timme (14)	Dalton Knecht (5)	Bronny James (6)	Crypto.com Arena; 18,668	32–21
54	February 12	Dallas	W 124–104	LeBron James (28)	LeBron James (10)	LeBron James (12)	Crypto.com Arena; 18,679	33–21
All-Star Game
55	February 20	L.A. Clippers	W 125–122	Luka Dončić (38)	Deandre Ayton (7)	Dončić, James (11)	Crypto.com Arena; 18,997	34–21
56	February 22	Boston	L 89–111	Luka Dončić (25)	Ayton, Reaves (7)	LeBron James (5)	Crypto.com Arena; 18,997	34–22
57	February 24	Orlando	L 109–110	Luka Dončić (22)	Deandre Ayton (13)	Luka Dončić (15)	Crypto.com Arena; 18,997	34–23
58	February 26	@ Phoenix	L 110–113	Luka Dončić (41)	Dončić, Hayes (8)	Luka Dončić (8)	Mortgage Matchup Center; 17,071	34–24
59	February 28	@ Golden State	W 129–101	Luka Dončić (26)	Deandre Ayton (10)	LeBron James (9)	Chase Center; 18,064	35–24

March: 15–2 (home: 10–0; road: 5–2)

Game	Date	Team	Score	High points	High rebounds	High assists	Location Attendance	Record
60	March 1	Sacramento	W 128–104	Luka Dončić (28)	Jake LaRavia (7)	Luka Dončić (9)	Crypto.com Arena; 18,272	36–24
61	March 3	New Orleans	W 110–101	Luka Dončić (27)	Luka Dončić (10)	Tied (7)	Crypto.com Arena; 18,248	37–24
62	March 5	@ Denver	L 113–120	Luka Dončić (27)	Luka Dončić (11)	LeBron James (8)	Ball Arena; 19,947	37–25
63	March 6	Indiana	W 128–117	Luka Dončić (44)	Luka Dončić (9)	Dončić, Reaves (5)	Crypto.com Arena; 18,713	38–25
64	March 8	New York	W 110–97	Luka Dončić (35)	Ayton, Dončić (8)	Austin Reaves (5)	Crypto.com Arena; 18,997	39–25
65	March 10	Minnesota	W 120–106	Dončić, Reaves (31)	Deandre Ayton (12)	Luka Dončić (11)	Crypto.com Arena; 18,997	40–25
66	March 12	Chicago	W 142–130	Luka Dončić (51)	Ayton, Dončić (10)	Luka Dončić (9)	Crypto.com Arena; 18,794	41–25
67	March 14	Denver	W 127–125 (OT)	Austin Reaves (32)	Luka Dončić (11)	Luka Dončić (13)	Crypto.com Arena; 18,997	42–25
68	March 16	@ Houston	W 100–92	Luka Dončić (36)	Deandre Ayton (11)	James, Reaves (5)	Toyota Center; 18,055	43–25
69	March 18	@ Houston	W 124–116	Luka Dončić (40)	Luka Dončić (9)	Luka Dončić (10)	Toyota Center; 18,055	44–25
70	March 19	@ Miami	W 134–126	Luka Dončić (60)	LeBron James (15)	LeBron James (10)	Kaseya Center; 20,177	45–25
71	March 21	@ Orlando	W 105–104	Luka Dončić (33)	Deandre Ayton (12)	Luka Dončić (8)	Kia Center; 19,597	46–25
72	March 23	@ Detroit	L 110–113	Luka Dončić (32)	Deandre Ayton (10)	LeBron James (10)	Little Caesars Arena; 20,180	46–26
73	March 25	@ Indiana	W 137–130	Luka Dončić (43)	Jaxson Hayes (10)	LeBron James (9)	Gainbridge Fieldhouse; 17,274	47–26
74	March 27	Brooklyn	W 116–99	Luka Dončić (41)	Tied (8)	LeBron James (8)	Crypto.com Arena; 18,997	48–26
75	March 30	Washington	W 120–101	LeBron James (21)	LeBron James (10)	LeBron James (12)	Crypto.com Arena; 18,997	49–26
76	March 31	Cleveland	W 127–113	Luka Dončić (42)	Deandre Ayton (9)	Luka Dončić (12)	Crypto.com Arena; 18,997	50–26

April: 3–3 (home: 2–1; road: 1–2)

Game	Date	Team	Score	High points	High rebounds	High assists	Location Attendance	Record
77	April 2	@ Oklahoma City	L 96–139	Austin Reaves (15)	Jake LaRavia (8)	Luka Dončić (7)	Paycom Center; 18,203	50–27
78	April 5	@ Dallas	L 128–134	LeBron James (30)	Luke Kennard (16)	LeBron James (15)	American Airlines Center; 19,829	50–28
79	April 7	Oklahoma City	L 87–123	Rui Hachimura (15)	Jake LaRavia (7)	Luke Kennard (9)	Crypto.com Arena; 18,997	50–29
80	April 9	@ Golden State	W 119–103	LeBron James (26)	LeBron James (8)	LeBron James (11)	Chase Center; 18,064	51–29
81	April 10	Phoenix	W 101–73	LeBron James (28)	Jarred Vanderbilt (7)	LeBron James (12)	Crypto.com Arena; 18,997	52–29
82	April 12	Utah	W 131–107	Ayton, Hachimura (22)	Ayton, Hachimura (10)	Marcus Smart (10)	Crypto.com Arena; 18,791	53–29

2025–26 season schedule

=== Playoffs ===
2026 playoff game log
Total: 4–6 (home: 2–3; road: 2–3)
First Round: 4–2 (home: 2–1; road: 2–1)

Game	Date	Team	Score	High points	High rebounds	High assists	Location Attendance	Series
1	April 18	Houston	W 107–98	Luke Kennard (27)	Deandre Ayton (11)	LeBron James (13)	Crypto.com Arena; 19,057	1–0
2	April 21	Houston	W 101–94	LeBron James (28)	LeBron James (8)	James, Smart (7)	Crypto.com Arena; 19,057	2–0
3	April 24	@ Houston	W 112–108 (OT)	LeBron James (29)	LeBron James (13)	Marcus Smart (10)	Toyota Center; 18,055	3–0
4	April 26	@ Houston	L 96–115	Deandre Ayton (19)	Deandre Ayton (10)	LeBron James (9)	Toyota Center; 18,055	3–1
5	April 29	Houston	L 93–99	LeBron James (25)	Deandre Ayton (17)	LeBron James (7)	Crypto.com Arena; 19,057	3–2
6	May 1	@ Houston	W 98–78	LeBron James (28)	Deandre Ayton (16)	LeBron James (8)	Toyota Center; 18,055	4–2

Conference Semifinals: 0–4 (home: 0–2; road: 0–2)

Game	Date	Team	Score	High points	High rebounds	High assists	Location Attendance	Series
1	May 5	@ Oklahoma City	L 90–108	LeBron James (27)	Deandre Ayton (11)	Marcus Smart (7)	Paycom Center; 18,203	0–1
2	May 7	@ Oklahoma City	L 107–125	Austin Reaves (31)	Deandre Ayton (10)	James, Reaves (6)	Paycom Center; 18,203	0–2
3	May 9	Oklahoma City	L 108–131	Rui Hachimura (21)	Adou Thiero (8)	Austin Reaves (9)	Crypto.com Arena; 19,057	0–3
4	May 11	Oklahoma City	L 110–115	Austin Reaves (27)	LeBron James (12)	Austin Reaves (6)	Crypto.com Arena; 19,057	0–4

2026 playoff schedule

=== NBA Cup ===
==== West Group B ====
Pos	Team	Pld	W	L	PF	PA	PD	Qualification
1	Los Angeles Lakers	4	4	0	499	453	+46	Advanced to knockout rounds
2	Memphis Grizzlies	4	3	1	464	450	+14	
3	Los Angeles Clippers	4	2	2	465	485	−20	
4	Dallas Mavericks	4	1	3	455	476	−21	
5	New Orleans Pelicans	4	0	4	465	484	−19	

Source: NBA

==== Game log ====
2025–26 game log
Total: 4–1 (Home: 2–1; Road: 2–0)
NBA Cup: 4–1 (home: 2–1; road: 2–0)

Game	Date	Team	Score	High points	High rebounds	High assists	Location Attendance	Record
1	October 31	@ Memphis	W 117–112	Luka Dončić (44)	Luka Dončić (12)	Luka Dončić (6)	FedExForum; 16,122	1–0
2	November 14	@ New Orleans	W 118–104	Austin Reaves (31)	Deandre Ayton (16)	Luka Dončić (12)	Smoothie King Center; 18,102	2–0
3	November 25	L.A. Clippers	W 135–118	Luka Dončić (43)	Dončić, Reaves (9)	Luka Dončić (13)	Crypto.com Arena; 18,997	3–0
4	November 28	Dallas	W 129–119	Austin Reaves (38)	Ayton, Reaves (8)	Luka Dončić (11)	Crypto.com Arena; 18,997	4–0
5	December 10	San Antonio	L 119–132	Luka Dončić (35)	LeBron James (15)	Dončić, James (8)	Crypto.com Arena; 18,684	4–1

2025–26 season schedule

== Player statistics ==
Legend
GP	Games played	GS	Games started	MPG	Minutes per game
FG%	Field-goal percentage	3P%	3-point field-goal percentage	FT%	Free-throw percentage
RPG	Rebounds per game	APG	Assists per game	SPG	Steals per game
BPG	Blocks per game	PPG	Points per game

=== Regular season ===
Los Angeles Lakers statistics
Player	GP	GS	MPG	FG%	3P%	FT%	RPG	APG	SPG	BPG	PPG
Deandre Ayton	72	72	27.2	.671		.645	8.0	.8	.6	1.0	12.5
Kobe Bufkin	16	1	7.4	.300	.192	.917	.8	.6	.1	.2	2.9
Luka Dončić	64	64	35.8	.476	.366	.780	7.7	8.3	1.6	.5	33.5
Rui Hachimura	68	41	28.3	.514	.443	.694	3.3	.8	.6	.3	11.5
Jaxson Hayes	66	9	18.3	.756	1.000	.653	4.1	.9	.4	.8	7.5
Bronny James	42	1	8.9	.409	.386	.857	.5	1.2	.5	.1	2.9
LeBron James	60	60	33.2	.515	.317	.737	6.1	7.2	1.2	.6	20.9
Luke Kennard^{†}	32	6	23.0	.527	.448	.912	2.6	2.4	.7	.1	9.0
Maxi Kleber	43	1	10.7	.452	.231	.538	2.0	.6	.4	.3	2.0
Dalton Knecht	54	1	10.2	.455	.342	.727	1.4	.4	.2	.2	4.2
Christian Koloko^{†}	2	0	3.0				.5	.0	.0	.0	.0
Jake LaRavia	82	43	25.1	.459	.321	.763	4.0	1.8	1.3	.5	8.2
Chris Mañon	9	0	5.1	.333	.000	.750	1.1	.3	.6	.2	.8
Austin Reaves	51	45	34.5	.490	.360	.871	4.7	5.5	1.1	.4	23.3
Marcus Smart	62	54	28.5	.395	.331	.822	2.8	3.0	1.4	.4	9.3
Nick Smith Jr.	30	1	12.5	.435	.395	.733	.8	1.0	.3	.1	6.2
Adou Thiero	25	0	6.0	.516	.333	.636	1.1	.4	.3	.1	1.9
Drew Timme	27	1	8.7	.576	.440	.556	1.2	.9	.2	.0	3.4
Jarred Vanderbilt	65	3	17.4	.471	.293	.589	4.5	1.3	.8	.3	4.4
Gabe Vincent^{†}	29	7	19.3	.346	.369	.909	.9	1.3	.5	.0	4.8

=== Playoffs ===
Los Angeles Lakers statistics
Player	GP	GS	MPG	FG%	3P%	FT%	RPG	APG	SPG	BPG	PPG
Deandre Ayton	10	10	28.5	.548		.615	9.6	.9	.2	.8	10.0
Rui Hachimura	10	10	38.6	.549	.569	.727	4.0	1.7	.9	.6	17.5
Jaxson Hayes	10	0	16.3	.679	.000	.704	3.2	.7	.3	.8	5.7
Bronny James	8	0	5.3	.500	.333		.4	.9	.1	.0	1.5
LeBron James	10	10	38.4	.459	.327	.746	6.7	7.3	1.3	.3	23.2
Luke Kennard	10	5	32.6	.488	.474	.826	3.5	2.3	.9	.1	11.5
Maxi Kleber	3	0	4.7	.000		.500	.7	1.0	.3	.0	.3
Dalton Knecht	5	0	3.6	.375	.400	1.000	1.2	.6	.0	.0	2.0
Jake LaRavia	8	0	14.3	.333	.286	1.000	2.1	.8	.5	.8	3.3
Austin Reaves	6	5	36.8	.407	.257	.860	4.0	5.8	.0	1.2	20.0
Marcus Smart	10	10	34.5	.394	.340	.791	3.5	5.1	2.4	1.0	12.9
Nick Smith Jr.	6	0	3.0	.429	.429	.500	.2	.2	.2	.2	2.7
Adou Thiero	6	0	5.7	.500	.000	.500	2.0	.2	.0	.0	1.5
Jarred Vanderbilt	7	0	10.7	.409	.111	.333	3.4	.3	.3	.0	2.9

- ^{†} Denotes player spent time with another team in the season. Stats reflect time with the Lakers only.

== Transactions ==
=== Trades ===
Date	Trade		Ref.
July 1, 2025	To Chicago Bulls: Draft rights to Lachlan Olbrich (No. 55); Cash considerations	To Los Angeles Lakers: Draft rights to Rocco Zikarsky (No. 45) (Note: LA Lakers flipped Rocco Zikarsky's rights to Minnesota in a separate trade.)	
July 6, 2025	Seven-team trade		
July 6, 2025	To Atlanta Hawks: David Roddy (two-way contract); 2031 second-round pick swap (Note: Atlanta may swap their own pick for Houston's pick.); Cash considerations	To Los Angeles Lakers: Draft rights to Adou Thiero (No. 36)	
July 6, 2025	To Brooklyn Nets: 2026 second-round pick (Note: The second-most favorable of the picks originally belonging to Boston, Indiana, Los Angeles, and Miami.); 2030 second-round pick (from Boston)	To Houston Rockets: Kevin Durant; Clint Capela (sign-and-trade)	
July 6, 2025	To Phoenix Suns: Jalen Green; Dillon Brooks; Daeqwon Plowden (two-way contract); Draft rights to Khaman Maluach (No. 10); Draft rights to Rasheer Fleming (No. 31); Draft rights to Koby Brea (No. 41); 2026 second-round pick (Note: The second-most favorable of the picks originally belonging to Dallas, Oklahoma City, and Philadelphia.); Least favorable 2032 second-round pick between Houston and Minnesota	To Minnesota Timberwolves: Draft rights to Rocco Zikarsky (No. 45); 2026 second-round pick (Note: The less favorable of the picks originally belonging to Denver and Golden State.); 2032 second-round pick (Note: The less favorable of the picks originally belonging to Houston and Phoenix.); Cash considerations	
July 6, 2025	To Golden State Warriors: Draft rights to Alex Toohey (No. 52); Draft rights to Jahmai Mashack (No. 59) (Note: Golden State flipped Jahmai Mashack's rights to Memphis in a separate trade.)		
February 5, 2026	To Los Angeles Lakers: Luke Kennard	To Atlanta Hawks: Gabe Vincent; 2032 second-round pick (from LA Lakers)	

=== Free agency ===
==== Re-signed ====
Date	Player	Contract Terms	Ref.
July 6, 2025	Jaxson Hayes	1-year $3.4M contract	
July 22, 2025	Christian Koloko	Two-way contract	

==== Additions ====
Date	Player	Contract Terms	Former Team	Ref.
July 6, 2025	Deandre Ayton	2-year $16M contract	Portland Trail Blazers	
July 6, 2025	Jake LaRavia	2-year $12M contract	Sacramento Kings	
July 22, 2025	Marcus Smart	2-year $11M contract	Washington Wizards	
July 24, 2025	Chris Mañon	Two-way contract	Vanderbilt Commodores	
September 30, 2025	Nick Smith Jr.	Two-way contract	Charlotte Hornets	
November 24, 2025	Drew Timme	Two-way contract	Brooklyn Nets	

==== Subtractions ====
Date	Player	Reason	New Team	Ref.
July 6, 2025	Dorian Finney-Smith	4-year $53M contract	Houston Rockets	
July 20, 2025	Jordan Goodwin	Waived	Phoenix Suns	
July 20, 2025	Shake Milton	Waived	KK Partizan	
July 20, 2025	Trey Jemison	Waived	Westchester Knicks	
July 20, 2025	Christian Koloko	Waived	Memphis Grizzlies	
N/A	Markieff Morris	Expired contract		
N/A	Alex Len	Expired contract	Real Madrid Baloncesto	

LeBron James
