= Marcus Smart =

American basketball player (born 1994)

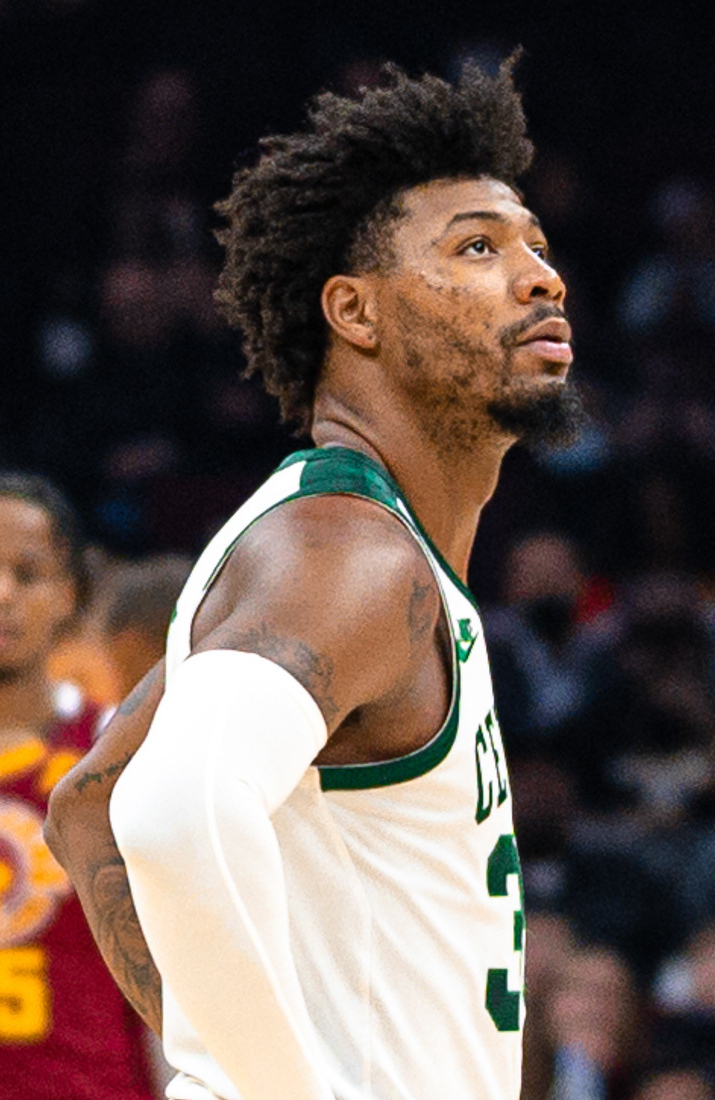
- Smart with the Boston Celtics in 2021

No. 36 – Houston Rockets
- Position: Point guard / shooting guard
- League: NBA

Personal information
- Born: March 6, 1994 (age 32) Flower Mound, Texas, U.S.
- Listed height: 6 ft 3 in (1.91 m)
- Listed weight: 220 lb (100 kg)

Career information
- High school: Edward S. Marcus (Flower Mound, Texas)
- College: Oklahoma State (2012–2014)
- NBA draft: 2014: 1st round, 6th overall pick
- Drafted by: Boston Celtics
- Playing career: 2014–present

Career history
- 2014–2023: Boston Celtics
- 2014: →Maine Red Claws
- 2023–2025: Memphis Grizzlies
- 2025: Washington Wizards
- 2025–2026: Los Angeles Lakers
- 2026–present: Houston Rockets

Career highlights
- NBA Defensive Player of the Year (2022); 3× NBA All-Defensive First Team (2019, 2020, 2022); NBA All-Rookie Second Team (2015); Consensus second-team All-American (2013); Third-team All-American – NABC (2014); Big 12 Player of the Year (2013); 2× First-team All-Big 12 (2013, 2014); USBWA National Freshman of the Year (2013); Big 12 Freshman of the Year (2013); McDonald's All-American (2012); Texas Mr. Basketball (2012)
- Stats at NBA.com
- Stats at Basketball Reference
Medals
Men's basketball
Representing United States
FIBA World U19 Championship
Gold medal – first place	2013 Czech Republic	National team
FIBA Americas U18 Championship
Gold medal – first place	2012 Brazil	National team

Marcus Osmond Smart (born March 6, 1994) is an American professional basketball player for the Houston Rockets of the National Basketball Association (NBA). Widely considered one of the most accomplished and versatile defenders of his era, he has been selected to the NBA All-Defensive First Team thrice and was the NBA Defensive Player of the Year in 2022, becoming only the second point guard after Gary Payton to win the award. Smart played college basketball for the Oklahoma State Cowboys.

Smart was drafted by the Boston Celtics with the sixth overall pick in the 2014 NBA Draft. He initially came off the bench for the Celtics before becoming the starting point guard in 2018. Smart helped the Celtics reach the NBA Finals in 2022. After eight seasons in Boston, he was traded to the Memphis Grizzlies. However, after greatly struggling with injuries in Memphis, Smart was traded to the Washington Wizards in 2025. In July 2025, he signed a two-year contract with the Los Angeles Lakers as a free agent, following a buyout agreement with the Wizards and subsequent clearance through waivers.

== Early life ==
Marcus Osmond Smart was born on March 6, 1994, in Flower Mound, Texas, to Billy Frank Smart and Camellia Smart, who died of myelodysplastic syndrome on September 16, 2018. He has four older brothers: Todd Westbrook (deceased), Jeff Westbrook, Jacob Smart, and Michael Smart. Smart attended Edward S. Marcus High School in Flower Mound, along with one of his future Oklahoma State teammates, Phillip Forte. As a senior, Smart averaged 15.1 points, 9.2 rebounds, and 5.0 assists. In high school, Smart achieved a record of 115–6 through three seasons and was a two-time 5A state champion. He was also named a McDonald's All-American and was an ESPNHS first team All-American. Smart went on to set a new Team USA U18 record for steals over a five-game period when he grabbed 18 during the 2012 FIBA Americas U18 Championships in Brazil.

Smart played youth football until the sixth grade and continues to enjoy playing tennis in his spare time.

Considered a five-star recruit by ESPN.com, Smart was listed as the No. 1 shooting guard and the No. 10 player in the nation in 2012.

== College career ==
During his freshman year at Oklahoma State, Smart led the Cowboys to a 24–8 record and they finished in third place in the Big 12 behind Kansas and Kansas State. He averaged 15.4 points, 5.8 rebounds, and 4.2 assists per game and led the Big 12 in steals with 99 and averaged 3.0 per game. Smart and the Cowboys earned a trip to the NCAA Tournament that year, clinching a #5 seed in the Midwest Region. During the first round of the tournament though, the Cowboys were eliminated by the #12 seed Oregon. On April 17, 2013, Smart held a press conference in the student union at OSU and announced that he would not declare for the NBA draft and instead return to OSU for his sophomore season. Smart's 99 steals set a freshman record in the Big 12.

On November 19, 2013, Smart scored 39 points leading the #7-seed Oklahoma State Cowboys past the #11-seed Memphis. On February 8, 2014, during a game at Texas Tech, Smart shoved a fan in the stands after a verbal altercation in the closing minutes of the game, and received a technical foul. Reports after the game stated that Smart claimed the fan yelled a racial slur at him. At a press conference the following afternoon, Smart would not comment on that element of the altercation, and coach Travis Ford chose not to address it. The fan denied using a racial slur and stated that he called Smart "a piece of crap." Audio from the incident confirmed the fan's account. Smart was subsequently suspended for three games and the fan agreed not to attend any further Texas Tech games during the 2013–14 season.

Later that season, Smart was named one of the 30 finalists for the Naismith College Player of the Year. In the first game of the 2014 NCAA tournament, the Cowboys lost to Gonzaga. Smart finished with 23 points, 13 rebounds, seven assists and six steals, becoming the first player in tournament history to record 20 points, 10 rebounds, five assists, and five steals.

During his two seasons at Oklahoma State, Smart averaged 16.6 points, 5.9 rebounds and 4.5 assists in 33.1 minutes per game. On April 7, 2014, he declared for the NBA draft, forgoing his final two years of college eligibility.

== Professional career ==
=== Boston Celtics (2014–2023) ===
==== Early years (2014–2016) ====
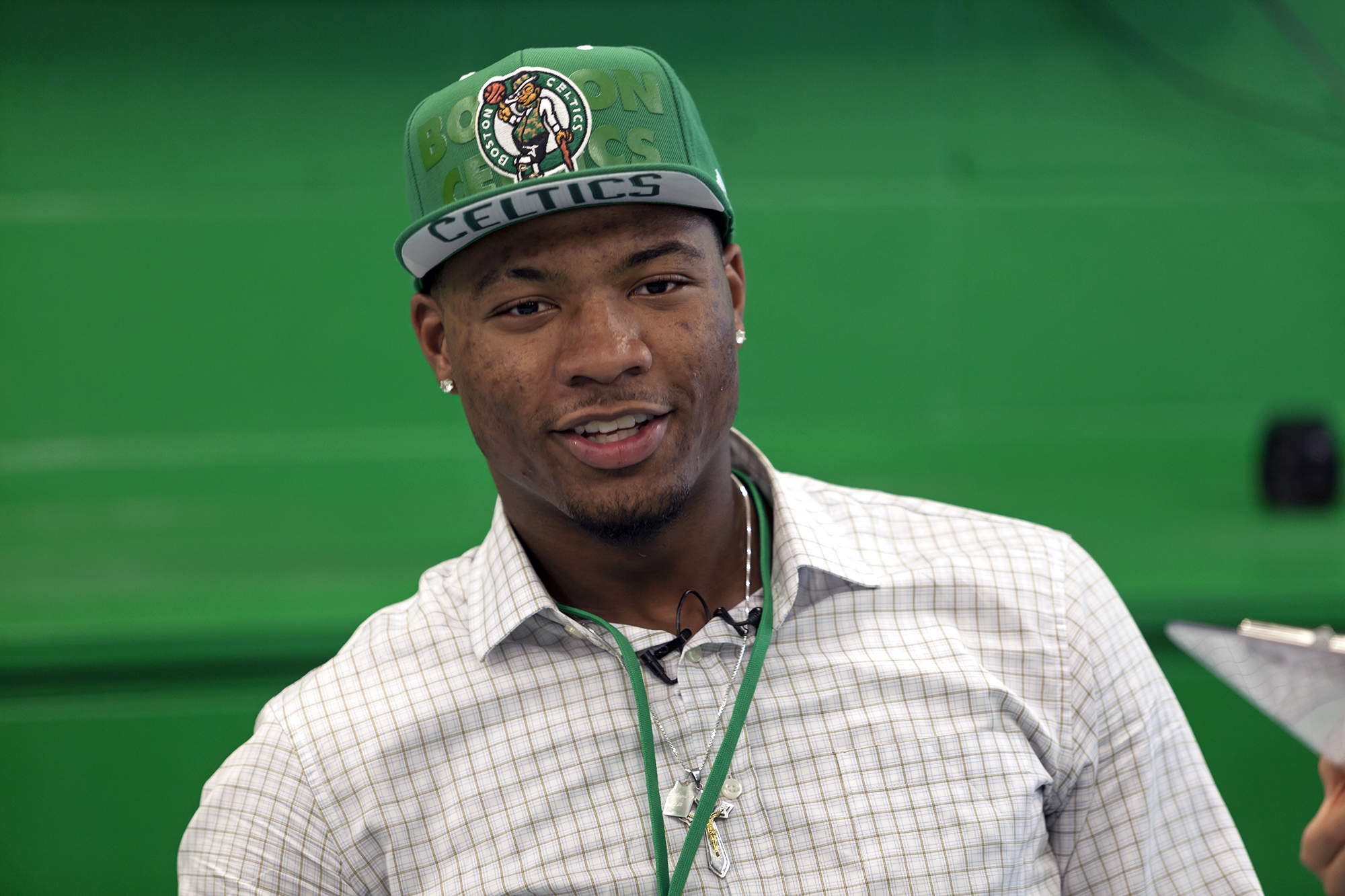
Smart in June 2014, shortly after being drafted by the Celtics

On June 26, 2014, Smart was selected with the sixth overall pick in the 2014 NBA draft by the Boston Celtics. He joined the Celtics for the 2014 NBA Summer League, and signed with the team on July 10. In just his fifth NBA game, Smart sprained his left ankle during a 101–98 victory over the Indiana Pacers on November 7. He underwent an MRI following the game and was ruled out for two to three weeks. After missing 10 games with the injury, Smart returned to action on December 3 against the Detroit Pistons. The next day, he was assigned to the Maine Red Claws of the NBA Development League. Smart was recalled the next day after playing in Maine's victory over the Erie BayHawks. On March 18, 2015, he scored a season-high 25 points in a 122–118 loss to the Oklahoma City Thunder. Three days later, Smart was suspended for one game without pay for hitting San Antonio Spurs forward Matt Bonner in the groin the previous night. On May 18, Smart was named to the NBA's All-Rookie Second Team, garnering 142 points in the voting process.

On July 16, 2015, while playing for the Celtics at the 2015 Las Vegas Summer League, Smart dislocated two fingers on his right hand. On November 15, Smart scored a career-high 26 points in a 100–85 victory over the Oklahoma City Thunder. Between November 22 and December 26, he missed 18 games with a lower left leg injury. Smart returned to action on December 27 against the New York Knicks, scoring six points in 13 minutes off the bench. On January 15, 2016, in a 117–103 victory over the Phoenix Suns, he recorded his first career triple-double with 10 points, 11 assists, and 11 rebounds, becoming the first Celtics player to record a triple-double off the bench since Art Williams did so in 1971. On January 31, Smart tied his career high of 26 points in a 119–114 loss to the Orlando Magic.

==== First Eastern Conference Finals appearance (2016–2017) ====
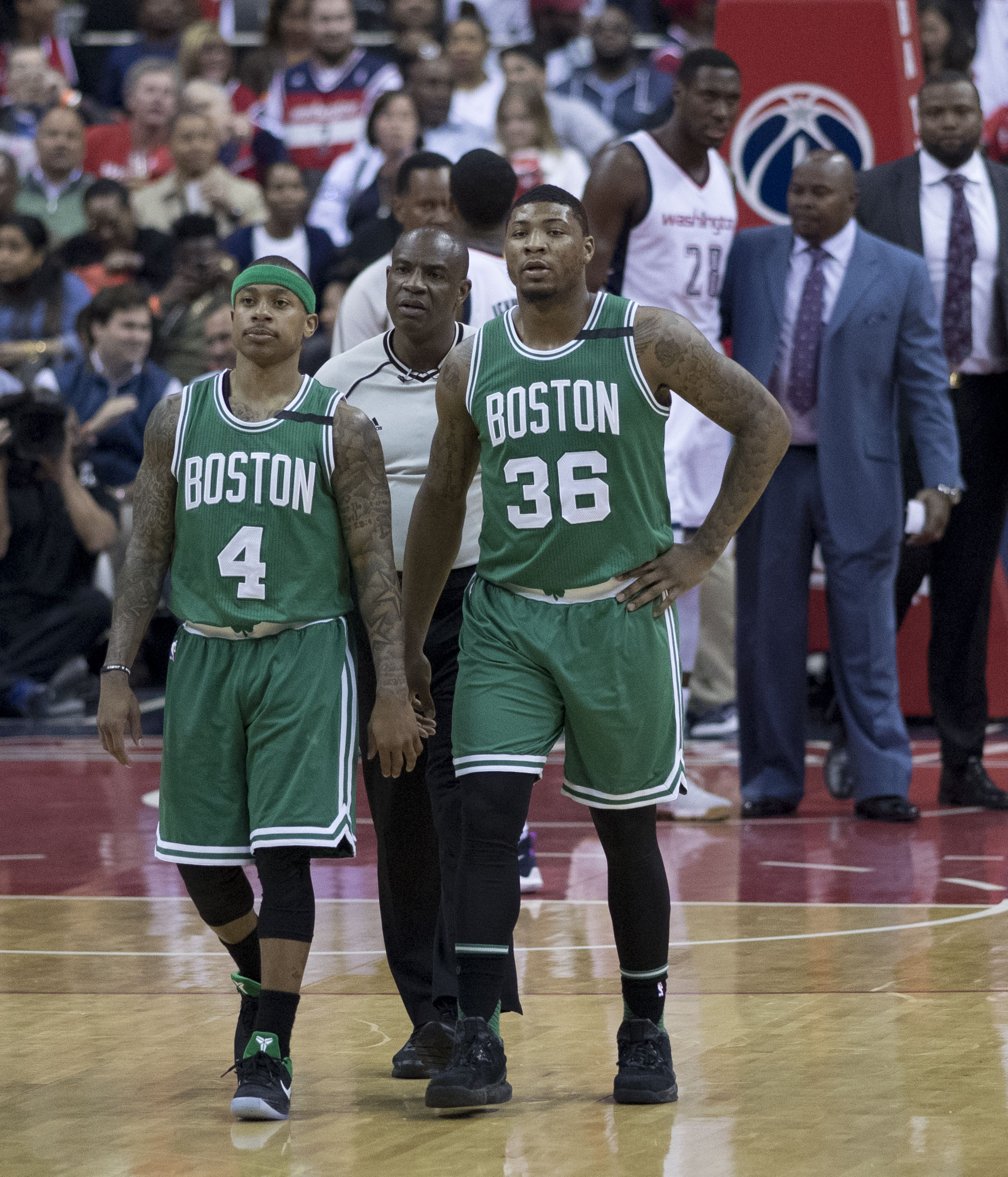
Smart (right) in May 2017, with teammate Isaiah Thomas

On November 9, 2016, Smart scored a then season-high 20 points in a 118–93 loss to the Washington Wizards. On December 25, he scored 15 points and made a tie-breaking three-pointer with 47 seconds left to help the Celtics claim a 119–114 victory over the New York Knicks. On January 7, 2017, Smart scored a season-high 22 points in a 117–108 victory over the New Orleans Pelicans.

During Game 3 of the Eastern Conference Finals against the Cleveland Cavaliers on May 21, Smart, who started in place of the injured Isaiah Thomas, made seven three-pointers and scored 27 points to help the Celtics win 111–108. The Celtics were blown out in the first two games of the series and came back from a 21-point deficit in the third quarter of Game 3. Boston went on to lose the series in five games.

==== Injuries and first All-Defensive selection (2017–2019) ====
On November 27, 2017, Smart scored a season-high 23 points, making 6-of-9 from three-point range, in a 118–108 loss to the Detroit Pistons. He missed 11 games between January 24 and February 14 after cutting his hand on glass at the team hotel in Los Angeles. On March 16, 2018, Smart was ruled out for the rest of the regular season with a torn ligament in his right thumb. After missing the Celtics' first four games of the playoffs, Smart returned for Game 5 of the first-round series against the Milwaukee Bucks. He came off the bench and had nine points, five rebounds, four assists, and three blocks in a 92–87 victory, helping the Celtics take a 3–2 lead.

On June 29, 2018, the Celtics tendered a qualifying offer to make Smart a restricted free agent. On July 19, he re-signed with the Celtics to a four-year, $52 million contract. On November 9, Smart had his first double-double of the season with 13 points and a season-high 10 assists in a 123–115 loss to the Utah Jazz. Smart missed the end of the regular season and the first round of the playoffs with a left oblique tear. He returned during the second round of the playoffs. Following the season, Smart was named to the NBA All-Defensive First Team.

==== Career high in scoring and health problems (2019–2021) ====
On January 18, 2020, Smart dropped a career-high 37 points in a 123–119 loss to the Phoenix Suns. He went 11 for 22 from three in the game, breaking the Celtics record for three pointers in a single game. On March 20, Smart was tested positive for COVID-19 after fellow NBA player Rudy Gobert was tested positive eight days prior, which had caused the NBA season to suspend indefinitely. Smart was one of the first NBA players to speak out publicly regarding the concerns of COVID-19 and how the community should not take the disease lightly. On March 29, he was cleared from COVID-19. After the season, Smart was named to the NBA All-Defensive First Team for the second time.

On April 28, 2021, Smart was suspended for one game without pay for directing threatening language towards a game official.

==== Defensive Player of the Year and NBA Finals appearance (2021–2023) ====
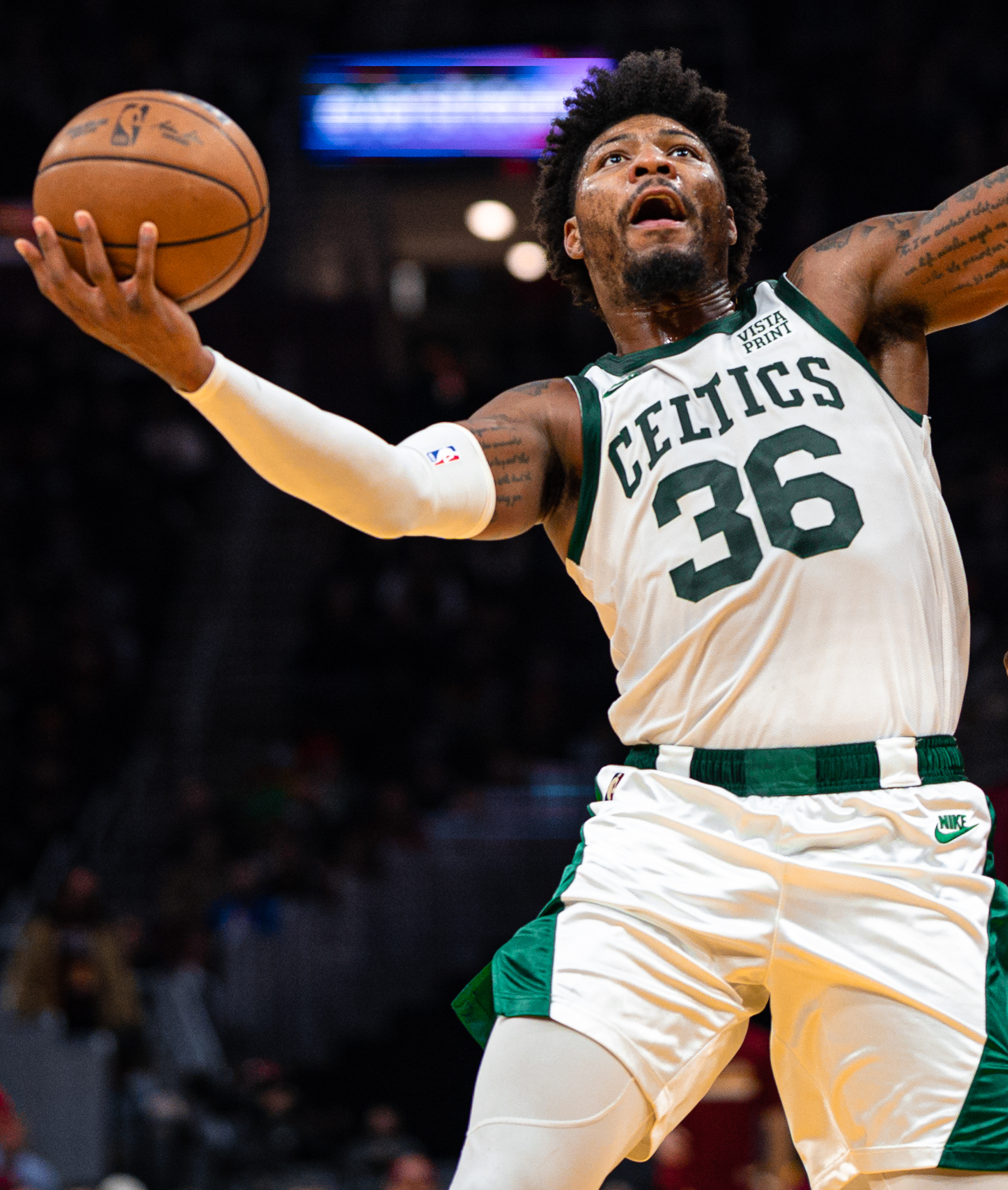
Smart in 2021

On August 16, 2021, the Celtics re-signed Smart to a four-year, $77 million contract extension. During the summer of 2021, new head coach Ime Udoka named Smart the team's starting point guard; he remained in that role throughout the season and during the Celtics' 2022 playoff run. Both Fox Sports and Deadspin have credited Smart's move to the starting point guard role as a major catalyst for the team's successful 2021–22 season. On October 14, 2021, he was suspended for the team's final preseason game for missing a team flight to Florida. As of February 2022, Smart was the longest-tenured member of the Celtics' team.

Smart was named the 2021–22 NBA Defensive Player of the Year on April 18, 2022, the first guard to win the award since Gary Payton won it in 1996. Smart became the fifth guard in NBA history (alongside Michael Jordan, Gary Payton, Sidney Moncrief, and Alvin Robertson) to win the award. He was also named to the NBA All-Defensive First Team, receiving more first-place votes than any other NBA player.

On May 19, 2022, in Game 2 of the Eastern Conference Finals, Smart recorded a playoff career-high 12 assists along with 24 points, nine rebounds, and three steals in a 127–102 victory over the Miami Heat to tie the series at 1–1. Ten days later in Game 7, he logged 24 points, nine rebounds, five assists, and two steals during a 100–96 victory, advancing to the NBA Finals for the first time in his career, and the Celtics' first NBA Finals appearance since 2010. On June 2, Smart made his Finals debut against the Golden State Warriors and finished the 120–108 road victory with 18 points, five rebounds, four assists, and two steals. Six days later in Game 3, Smart had 24 points, seven rebounds, and five assists in the 116–100 victory. The Celtics took a 2–1 series lead, but eventually lost in six games.

In the 2023 NBA playoffs, Smart averaged 14.9 points, 4.0 rebounds, 5.1 assists, and 1.3 steals per game. He averaged 34 minutes played per game, shot 45.3% from the field overall, made 36.1% of three-point attempts, and made 80% of free throw attempts. Smart had only 1.9 fouls times per game and turned the ball over 2.3 times per game.

=== Memphis Grizzlies (2023–2025) ===
On June 22, 2023, Smart was traded to the Memphis Grizzlies as part of a three-team deal that sent Kristaps Porziņģis to the Celtics and Tyus Jones to Washington. The trade also involved the Grizzlies sending a 2023 first-round pick (pick No. 25) and a top-four-protected 2024 first-round pick (via Golden State Warriors) to the Celtics. Additionally, the Washington Wizards acquired Danilo Gallinari, Mike Muscala, and Boston's 2023 second-round pick (pick No. 35).

On October 25, 2023, Smart made his Grizzlies debut, recording up 17 points, three assists, and two steals in a 111–104 loss to the New Orleans Pelicans. At the 2024 NBA All-Star break, Smart averaged a career best 14.4 points alongside 2.0 steals while playing 30.2 minutes per game. However, he only appeared in 20 games during the 2023–24 season due to injuries. Smart played in just one game following the All-Star break, a 121–118 overtime loss to the Sacramento Kings on March 18, where he played just five minutes without recording a single stat in any category.

=== Washington Wizards (2025) ===
On February 6, 2025, Smart was traded to the Washington Wizards along with Colby Jones and Alex Len for Johnny Davis, Marvin Bagley III, and a 2025 second-round pick in a three-team trade that sent Jake LaRavia to the Sacramento Kings.

On July 20, Smart was waived by the Wizards after a contract buyout agreement.

=== Los Angeles Lakers (2025–2026) ===
On July 22, 2025, Smart signed a two-year, $11 million deal with the Los Angeles Lakers. Luka Doncic also played a role in recruiting Smart to the team. On December 23, he was fined $35,000 for making an obscene gesture towards a game official at halftime during a game against the Utah Jazz. During Game 3 of the first round against the Houston Rockets on April 24, 2026, Smart put up what was described as a strong defensive performance, recording 21 points and 10 assists.

=== Houston Rockets (2026–present) ===
On July 10, 2026, Smart signed a two-year, $12.4 million deal with the Houston Rockets, with the second year being a player option. This reunited him with his former Celtics head coach Ime Udoka, under whom he won NBA Defensive Player of the Year in 2022.

On October 21, Smart made his Rockets debut, recording 10 points and two assists in a 128–110 victory over the Dallas Mavericks. On November 11 against the Golden State Warriors, Smart was ejected from the game after throwing a punch at Charles Bassey. One day later, Smart was suspended for three games.

== Player profile ==
Smart plays both the point guard and shooting guard positions, but was named the Celtics' starting point guard in 2021. Standing at 6 feet 3 inches (1.91 m) with a 6-foot-9-inch (2.06 m) wingspan, he is capable of guarding all five positions, enabling him to play a switching defense with historic efficiency.

Smart has earned a reputation as a hustle player. He is known for diving for loose balls and taking charges, and has been nicknamed "the Cobra" as a result. Due to his physicality, quick hands, and elite basketball IQ, many consider Smart to be one of the most versatile and consistent defenders in the NBA.

Although not a high percentage shooter, Smart is aggressive on offense and defense. He often guards opposing players taller than him, using his physicality to make them uncomfortable and often causing turnovers or missed shots. Over Smart's years in the league, his three-point shooting has improved. Former teammate Kemba Walker describes the energy Smart brings to the game: "It's exciting. It's energizing. He just gets everybody going. Gets us going, gets the crowd going. Like I said, we just kinda feed off him. He just does so many great things. And propels our defense each and every night."

== Career statistics ==
Legend
GP	Games played	GS	Games started	MPG	Minutes per game
FG%	Field goal percentage	3P%	3-point field goal percentage	FT%	Free throw percentage
RPG	Rebounds per game	APG	Assists per game	SPG	Steals per game
BPG	Blocks per game	PPG	Points per game	**Bold**	Career high

=== NBA ===
==== Regular season ====
Year	Team	GP	GS	MPG	FG%	3P%	FT%	RPG	APG	SPG	BPG	PPG
2014–15	Boston	67	38	27.0	.367	.335	.646	3.3	3.1	1.5	.3	7.8
2015–16	Boston	61	10	27.3	.348	.253	.777	**4.2**	3.0	1.5	.3	9.0
2016–17	Boston	79	24	30.4	.359	.284	.812	3.9	4.6	1.6	.4	10.6
2017–18	Boston	54	11	29.9	.367	.301	.729	3.5	4.8	1.3	.4	10.2
2018–19	Boston	**80**	60	27.5	.422	.364	.806	2.9	4.0	1.8	.4	8.9
2019–20	Boston	60	40	32.0	.375	.347	**.836**	3.8	4.9	1.7	**.5**	12.9
2020–21	Boston	48	45	**32.9**	.398	.330	.790	3.5	5.7	1.5	**.5**	13.1
2021–22	Boston	71	**71**	32.3	.418	.331	.793	3.8	5.9	1.7	.3	12.1
2022–23	Boston	61	61	32.1	.415	.336	.746	3.1	**6.3**	1.5	.4	11.5
2023–24	Memphis	20	20	30.2	.430	.313	.768	2.7	4.3	**2.1**	.3	**14.5**
2024–25	Memphis	19	6	21.1	.358	.322	.833	2.3	3.7	1.2	.3	8.7
2024–25	Washington	15	1	18.7	**.440**	**.392**	.686	1.9	2.5	1.1	.2	9.3
2025–26	L.A. Lakers	62	54	28.5	.395	.331	.822	2.8	3.0	1.4	.4	9.3
Career		697	441	29.4	.389	.324	.779	3.4	4.4	1.6	.4	10.5

==== Playoffs ====
Year	Team	GP	GS	MPG	FG%	3P%	FT%	RPG	APG	SPG	BPG	PPG
2015	Boston	4	3	22.5	**.483**	.231	.533	2.8	1.3	.3	.3	9.8
2016	Boston	6	1	32.2	.367	.344	.810	4.5	3.0	1.7	.8	12.0
2017	Boston	18	3	29.9	.351	**.397**	.640	4.7	4.7	1.5	.9	8.6
2018	Boston	15	4	29.9	.336	.221	.735	3.7	5.3	1.7	.7	9.8
2019	Boston	2	0	16.0	.091	.091	.667	2.0	2.0	1.5	.0	3.5
2020	Boston	17	16	**38.1**	.394	.333	**.875**	**5.2**	4.6	1.2	.5	14.5
2021	Boston	5	5	36.0	.439	.372	.714	4.4	**6.0**	1.0	.2	**17.8**
2022	Boston	**21**	**21**	36.2	.405	.350	.806	4.5	5.9	1.2	.2	15.4
2023	Boston	20	20	34.0	.453	.361	.800	4.0	5.1	1.3	.3	14.9
2026	L.A. Lakers	10	10	34.5	.394	.340	.791	3.5	5.1	**2.4**	**1.0**	12.9
Career		118	83	33.2	.396	.335	.765	4.3	4.9	1.4	.5	12.8

=== College ===
Year	Team	GP	GS	MPG	FG%	3P%	FT%	RPG	APG	SPG	BPG	PPG
2012–13	Oklahoma State	**33**	**32**	**33.5**	.404	.290	**.777**	5.8	4.2	**3.0**	**.7**	15.4
2013–14	Oklahoma State	31	31	32.7	**.422**	**.299**	.728	**5.9**	**4.8**	2.9	.6	**18.0**
Career		64	63	33.1	.413	.295	.751	5.9	4.5	2.9	.6	16.6

== See also ==
- List of NBA career playoff 3-point scoring leaders
- List of NBA single-game 3-point field goal leaders
