= Will Richard =

American basketball player (born 2002)

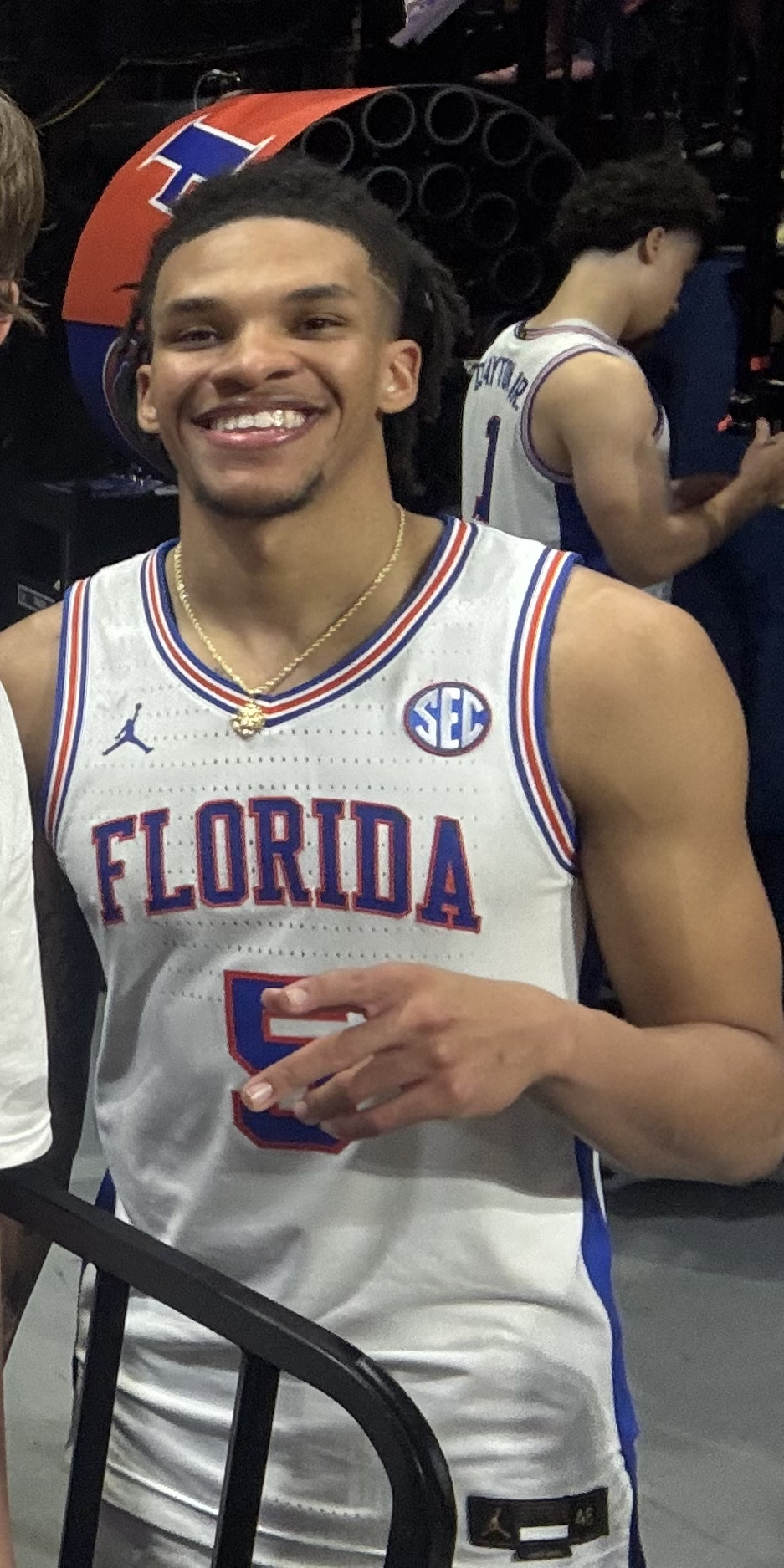
- Richard with Florida in 2025

No. 3 – Golden State Warriors
- Position: Shooting guard
- League: NBA

Personal information
- Born: December 24, 2002 (age 23) Fairburn, Georgia, U.S.
- Listed height: 6 ft 3 in (1.91 m)
- Listed weight: 207 lb (94 kg)

Career information
- High school: Woodward Academy (College Park, Georgia)
- College: Belmont (2021–2022); Florida (2022–2025)
- NBA draft: 2025: 2nd round, 56th overall pick
- Drafted by: Memphis Grizzlies
- Playing career: 2025–present

Career history
- 2025–present: Golden State Warriors

Career highlights
- NCAA champion (2025); OVC All-Newcomer team (2022)
- Stats at NBA.com
- Stats at Basketball Reference

William Richard (born December 24, 2002) is an American professional basketball player for the Golden State Warriors of the National Basketball Association (NBA). He played college basketball for the Belmont Bruins and the Florida Gators. He was drafted by the Memphis Grizzlies with the 56th pick in the second round of the 2025 NBA draft.

== Early life and high school career ==
Richard grew up in Fairburn, Georgia and attended Woodward Academy. His senior season, he averaged 24.0 points, 8.8 rebounds, and 2.1 steals per game, and during his time at Woodward played on the varsity basketball team with current Los Angeles Lakers center, Walker Kessler. He earned first-team All-State honors as a senior and finished his high school career with over 1,000 points and 90 wins. Richard was a key player on the Woodward Academy team that won the Georgia 4A State Championship during his junior year. He was ranked second in the state of Georgia for scoring per 32 minutes and was named to the GHSAA first-team All-State. Coming out of high school, he committed to playing college basketball for Belmont.

== College career ==
=== Belmont ===
In the first round of the 2022 National Invitation Tournament, Richard notched 22 points and eight rebounds in a loss to Vanderbilt. As a freshman in 2021–22, he averaged 12.1 points and six rebounds per game while shooting 32.6 percent from three, earning Ohio Valley Conference all-newcomer team honors. After the season, Richard entered his name into the NCAA transfer portal.

=== Florida ===
Richard transferred to play for the Florida Gators. In 2022–23, he made 30 starts out of 32 games played, averaging 10.4 points and 4.5 rebounds while shooting 39.8 percent from 3-point range in his first season as a Gator. On February 24, 2024, Richard dropped 21 points and five threes in a win over Vanderbilt. During the 2023–24 season, he made 35 starts, averaging 11.4 points and 3.9 rebounds per game while shooting 34.5 percent from three. On December 29, 2024, Richard totaled 26 points, five rebounds, two steals and two assists in a win over Stetson. On February 25, 2025, he notched 30 points in a loss to Georgia. On March 1, Richard put up 25 points on nine of 13 from the field in a win over Texas A&M. In the national championship game, Richard scored 18 points, including all four of his three-pointers in the first half, in a close, come-from-behind 65–63 win over Houston.

== Professional career ==
On June 25, 2025, Richard was selected with the 56th overall pick by the Memphis Grizzlies in the second round of the 2025 NBA draft. He was later traded to the Golden State Warriors, in exchange for the draft rights to the 59th and last pick (Jahmai Mashack), the draft rights to Justinian Jessup (2020 51st pick), and a 2032 protected second-round pick.

On September 29, 2025, Richard signed his first contract with the Warriors. On November 5, Richard had his first career start with the Warriors and scored a career-high of 30 points.

He won the 2026 NBA Summer League Championship with the Warriors, beating the Memphis Grizzlies 94–90 in the final.

== Career statistics ==
Legend
GP	Games played	GS	Games started	MPG	Minutes per game
FG%	Field goal percentage	3P%	3-point field goal percentage	FT%	Free throw percentage
RPG	Rebounds per game	APG	Assists per game	SPG	Steals per game
BPG	Blocks per game	PPG	Points per game	**Bold**	Career high

*	Led NCAA Division I

=== NBA ===
Year	Team	GP	GS	MPG	FG%	3P%	FT%	RPG	APG	SPG	BPG	PPG
2025–26	Golden State	69	21	20.0	.468	.335	.852	2.5	1.3	1.2	.1	6.4
Career		69	21	20.0	.468	.335	.852	2.5	1.3	1.2	.1	6.4

=== College ===
Year	Team	GP	GS	MPG	FG%	3P%	FT%	RPG	APG	SPG	BPG	PPG
2021–22	Belmont	33	30	27.6	.468	.326	.804	**6.0**	1.8	1.2	**.8**	12.1
2022–23	Florida	32	30	27.8	**.493**	**.398**	**.857**	4.5	.8	.9	.6	10.4
2023–24	Florida	36	35	29.5	.411	.345	.802	3.9	1.3	.9	.5	11.4
2024–25	Florida	**40***	**40***	**31.6**	.487	.359	.844	4.6	**1.9**	**1.7**	.3	**13.3**
Career		141	135	29.3	.463	.355	.825	4.7	1.5	1.2	.5	11.9

== Personal life ==
Richard is the son of Al and Helen Richard. He is a Christian.
