= Lawrence Tanter =

American public address announcer (1949–2026)

- Tanter in college, c. 1968
- Born: 1949; Chicago, Illinois, U.S.
- Died: September 23, 2026 (aged 76)
- Occupation: Announcer
- Known for: PA announcer for the Los Angeles Lakers

Lawrence Tanter (1949 – September 23, 2026), also known as L.T., was an American public address announcer for the Los Angeles Lakers of the National Basketball Association (NBA). While working with the Lakers, he was a longtime disc jockey and program director at both jazz and rhythm and blues radio stations in Los Angeles.

== Early life ==
Tanter was born in Chicago in 1949. He attended Thornton High School in the Chicago area, where he played basketball and helped lead the team to a state title. He also played the saxophone and clarinet. A 6-foot-7-inch (2.01 m) forward, Tanter earned an athletic scholarship to play college basketball at the University of Dubuque. He worked at the college radio station after responding to an ad for a host for a Sunday night jazz program.

== Professional career ==
Tanter moved to Los Angeles in 1971, and was initially a cab driver. He began working at radio station KJLH in 1972, before joining KUTE and driving their quiet storm format.

He began attending Los Angeles Lakers games after they acquired Kareem Abdul-Jabbar. Listening to their public address announcer piqued Tanter's interest in the role. He was friends with Lakers player Jamaal Wilkes, who helped him submit an audition tape. Tanter was hired by Lakers executive Bob Steiner, and began working as the Lakers' public address announcer during the 1982–83 season. He became their longest-tenured PA announcer. During his tenure at The Forum and later Crypto.com Arena, the Lakers won 9 NBA championships, (Note: The Lakers won titles in the 1985, 1987, 1988, 2000, 2001, 2002, 2009, 2010, and 2020 NBA Finals. Some sources say they won 10 titles during his tenure.) and he called 14 NBA Finals series.

Known for his smooth baritone voice and affinity for jazz music, Tanter maintained his low-key style, even as other league announcers grew louder and sought attention. “I never tried to be a cheerleader”, he said. His signature call was "Llllaker Girlsss" after the team's dance squad completed a performance and scampered off the court. On traveling violations, he called "too many steps". Tanter mixed his inflections. On an exciting play, he extended the vowel of a name, such as "James Woorrrtheeeee", "Michael Coooooperrr", "Kobeeee Bryant", or "LeBronnnn James".

Tanter resigned from the Lakers in 1993, when he became co-owner of KQBR in Sacramento, California. "It was the worst year of my life”, Steiner said. “[Lakers owner] Jerry [Buss] wanted a replacement who sounded like Lawrence—we couldn’t find anyone". Tanter moved back to Los Angeles and returned to the Lakers in 1995, after missing two seasons.

When the WWE fought with the Denver Nuggets over an arena booking for a playoff game in 2009, Tanter was recruited as guest ring announcer for the main event of a newly relocated Raw at Staples Center. In the match, five heel (villain) wrestlers in Nuggets jerseys competed against five face (hero) wrestlers in Lakers jerseys, and the Lakers team won. Soon afterward, the Lakers eliminated the Nuggets in the 2009 Western Conference Finals 4–2. They went on to defeat the Orlando Magic in the 2009 NBA Finals and capture their 15th NBA title.

The Lakers won their 17th NBA championship in 2019–20. That season, Kobe Bryant died in a helicopter crash in January 2020. In the Lakers' first game after his death, Tanter introduced all five Lakers starters as Kobe Bryant, as suggested by LeBron James. Tanter called it "the hardest introductions ever". Later that year, he played an instrumental role in creating an air of normalcy for Lakers "home" games in the 2020 NBA Bubble, as the league returned to action following a hiatus due to the ongoing coronavirus pandemic. In July, he recorded an array of starting lineup introductions, accounting for potential lineup variations and team highlights, at a home studio in Los Angeles. Matt Shelton, the Lakers' director of game entertainment, pieced together Tanter's tracks with Adobe Audition editing software. As the Lakers advanced in the postseason, Tanter's voice was a part of the game presentation.

Tanter's other on-air work in Los Angeles included KTWV. He served as program director at KUTE, KACE, and KKJZ. Additionally, he served as the announcer for LTV, the Lakers pregame show on KCAL-TV, during the Lakers' time with that station.

After more than 40 seasons with the Lakers, (Note: Tanter's tenure spanned from 1982–83 through 2025–26. While some sources say 43 seasons, he missed two seasons in 1993–94 and 1994–95. Some other sources say he missed only one year, 1994.) Tanter retired from his role as public address announcer at the conclusion of the 2025–26 season. He had suffered a stroke, which caused him to miss the last six games of the regular season plus the playoffs. He remained with the Lakers as an advisor focusing on game presentation until his death.

== Personal life ==
Tanter had a son named Miles.

In March 2026, Tanter was walking in his bedroom when he lost all strength in his legs and arms and collapsed. He lived alone, and refused to call for help, though he had access to a phone. He asked for help the next morning, and a stroke was diagnosed. He died on September 23, 2026, at the age of 76.
