= Jahmai Mashack =

American basketball player (born 2002)

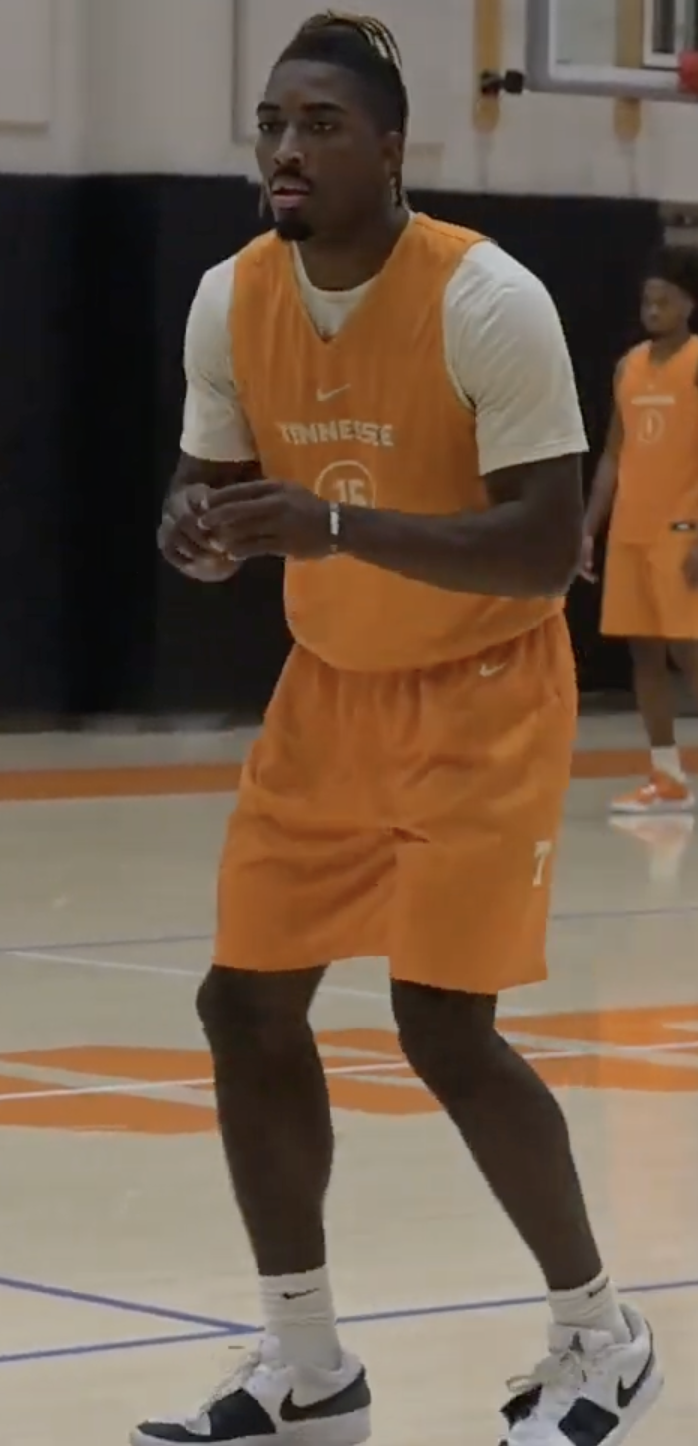
- Mashack with Tennessee in 2024

No. 21 – Memphis Grizzlies
- Position: Shooting guard
- League: NBA

Personal information
- Born: November 10, 2002 (age 24) Riverside, California, U.S.
- Listed height: 6 ft 4 in (1.93 m)
- Listed weight: 203 lb (92 kg)

Career information
- High school: Etiwanda (Rancho Cucamonga, California)
- College: Tennessee (2021–2025)
- NBA draft: 2025: 2nd round, 59th overall pick
- Drafted by: Houston Rockets
- Playing career: 2025–present

Career history
- 2025: Memphis Hustle
- 2025–present: Memphis Grizzlies
- 2025–present: →Memphis Hustle

Career highlights
- SEC All-Defensive team (2025)
- Stats at NBA.com
- Stats at Basketball Reference

Jahmai Hasan Mashack (born November 10, 2002) is an American professional basketball player for the Memphis Grizzlies of the National Basketball Association (NBA), on a two-way contract with the Memphis Hustle of the NBA G League. He played college basketball for the Tennessee Volunteers and was selected by the Houston Rockets with the last pick in the second round (59th) of the 2025 NBA draft.

== Early life and high school career ==
Mashack was born on November 10, 2002, in Riverside, California. His father, Elton, was a first-team All-West Coast Conference (WCC) in basketball for the Loyola Marymount Lions, while his mother, Meika, competed in track and field for the UNLV Rebels. His older brother, Kwesi Mashack, played cornerback for the Arizona Wildcats from 2014 to 2017. His younger sister, Malika Mashack, like her mother, is currently on the track & field team at UNLV Rebels.

At age four, he battled Guillain–Barré syndrome, which he recovered from but required years of physical therapy. He attended Etiwanda High School in Rancho Cucamonga and was a top basketball player there, excelling on defense. He helped Etiwanda to the CIF Southern California Regional final as a junior and as a senior helped them to the title while being named the Cal-Hi Sports State Senior Player of the Year, the Baseline League Player of the Year and to the Los Angeles Times All-Star team. Ranked a four-star shooting guard prospect and a top-80 recruit nationally, he committed to playing college basketball for Tennessee.

== College career ==
As a freshman for the Volunteers in 2021–22, Mashack appeared in 27 games while playing 4.6 minutes per game. He was part of the NCAA Tournament team as a freshman. The following year, he started 13 of 36 games and averaged 4.7 points. He also started all three of Tennessee's NCAA Tournament games, averaging 6.7 points in those games. As a junior in 2023–24, Mashack averaged 4.5 points and 3.1 rebounds while starting eight games and contributing to the team's Southeastern Conference (SEC) regular season championship. In his last year, he started all 38 games and helped Tennessee reach the Elite Eight of the NCAA Tournament, averaging six points and 4.2 rebounds. During his collegiate career, he won 109 games for the Volunteers, including nine in the NCAA Tournament, a team-record.

Although Mashack averaged only 4.2 points per game during his four seasons at Tennessee, he was considered one of the top defensive players in the nation. The Knoxville News Sentinel described him as a "master at knowing an opponent's strengths and weaknesses offensively" and he was often tasked with guarding opponents' best players. In his last year, he ranked fourth nationally in Defensive Box Plus-Minus and was selected to the SEC All-Defensive team, as well as named a finalist for the Naismith Defensive Player of the Year Award. In March 2025, he received Tennessee's Torchbearer award, the highest honor for school students.

== Professional career ==
Mashack was selected by the Houston Rockets in the second round (59th overall) of the 2025 NBA draft, with his rights then traded to the Memphis Grizzlies from the Golden State Warriors via the Phoenix Suns, in a deal exchange for the draft rights to the 56th pick (Will Richard). He was the final selection in the draft. Mashack and teammate Chaz Lanier were two players from the University of Tennessee to be drafted into the NBA.

Mashack began the 2025–26 season on the Memphis Hustle of the NBA G League. On November 16, the Grizzlies signed Mashack to a two-way contract. He made his NBA debut on November 20 against the Sacramento Kings, where he scored six points, and tallied up two rebounds in six minutes. On February 7, 2026, Mashack made his first career start against the Portland Trail Blazers, where he totaled eight points, a career-high of six steals, one rebound, and one assist in 30 minutes, additionally, this was the first game where Mashack had to play the center position due to the absence of players due to injury and the trade of Jaren Jackson Jr. Mashack converted 3-of-9 field goal attempts and 2-of-7 three-point attempts. On February 9, Mashack scored a career-high 17 points against the Golden State Warriors. On April 10, Mashack recorded a triple-double with 13 points, 15 rebounds, and 14 assists in a 147–101 loss to the Utah Jazz. The performance marked as a career-high in rebounds and assists for Mashack. Mashack finished the season averaging 6.2 points, 2.6 rebounds, and 2.2 assists.

On June 30, 2026, it was announced that Mashack would be participating in the 2026 NBA Summer League with the Grizzlies.

== Player profile ==
Mashack was widely regarded as one of the top defenders in college basketball during the 2024–25 season. He is known for his aggressive, anticipatory style of defense and frequently takes on the opposing team's most challenging assignments, demonstrating activity with both his hands and feet. While he is most effective guarding guards and smaller wings, he is also capable of defending larger players due to his anticipation and physical strength. Offensively, Mashack is not expected to play a central role. He is considered a capable three-point shooter but does not pose a significant scoring threat, and his ball-handling and playmaking abilities are adequate.

== Personal life ==
In a sit-down interview with Grind City Media, Mashack is a big "NBA2K, friends, and family guy", and growing up as a kid, he was a big fan of the Oklahoma City Thunder especially when Kevin Durant and Russell Westbrook were there, as those were one of his favorite players growing up, as he got older, he began to enjoy watching Kawhi Leonard, and Jrue Holiday a lot due to their defensive play style.

== Career statistics ==
Legend
GP	Games played	GS	Games started	MPG	Minutes per game
FG%	Field goal percentage	3P%	3-point field goal percentage	FT%	Free throw percentage
RPG	Rebounds per game	APG	Assists per game	SPG	Steals per game
BPG	Blocks per game	PPG	Points per game	**Bold**	Career high

=== NBA ===
Year	Team	GP	GS	MPG	FG%	3P%	FT%	RPG	APG	SPG	BPG	PPG
2025–26	Memphis	31	7	21.7	.395	.253	.543	2.6	2.2	1.2	.5	6.2
Career		31	7	21.7	.395	.253	.543	2.6	2.2	1.2	.5	6.2

=== College ===
Year	Team	GP	GS	MPG	FG%	3P%	FT%	RPG	APG	SPG	BPG	PPG
2021–22	Tennessee	27	0	4.6	.412	.333	.444	.7	.3	.4	.1	.7
2022–23	Tennessee	36	13	18.1	.420	.314	.579	2.4	**1.5**	1.4	.3	4.7
2023–24	Tennessee	36	8	17.9	.448	**.359**	.720	3.1	1.3	.8	.3	4.5
2024–25	Tennessee	**38**	**38**	**28.2**	**.454**	.351	**.723**	**4.2**	**1.5**	**1.7**	**.5**	**6.0**
Career		137	59	18.2	.440	.343	.668	2.8	1.2	1.1	.3	4.2
