= Adou Thiero =

American basketball player (born 2004)

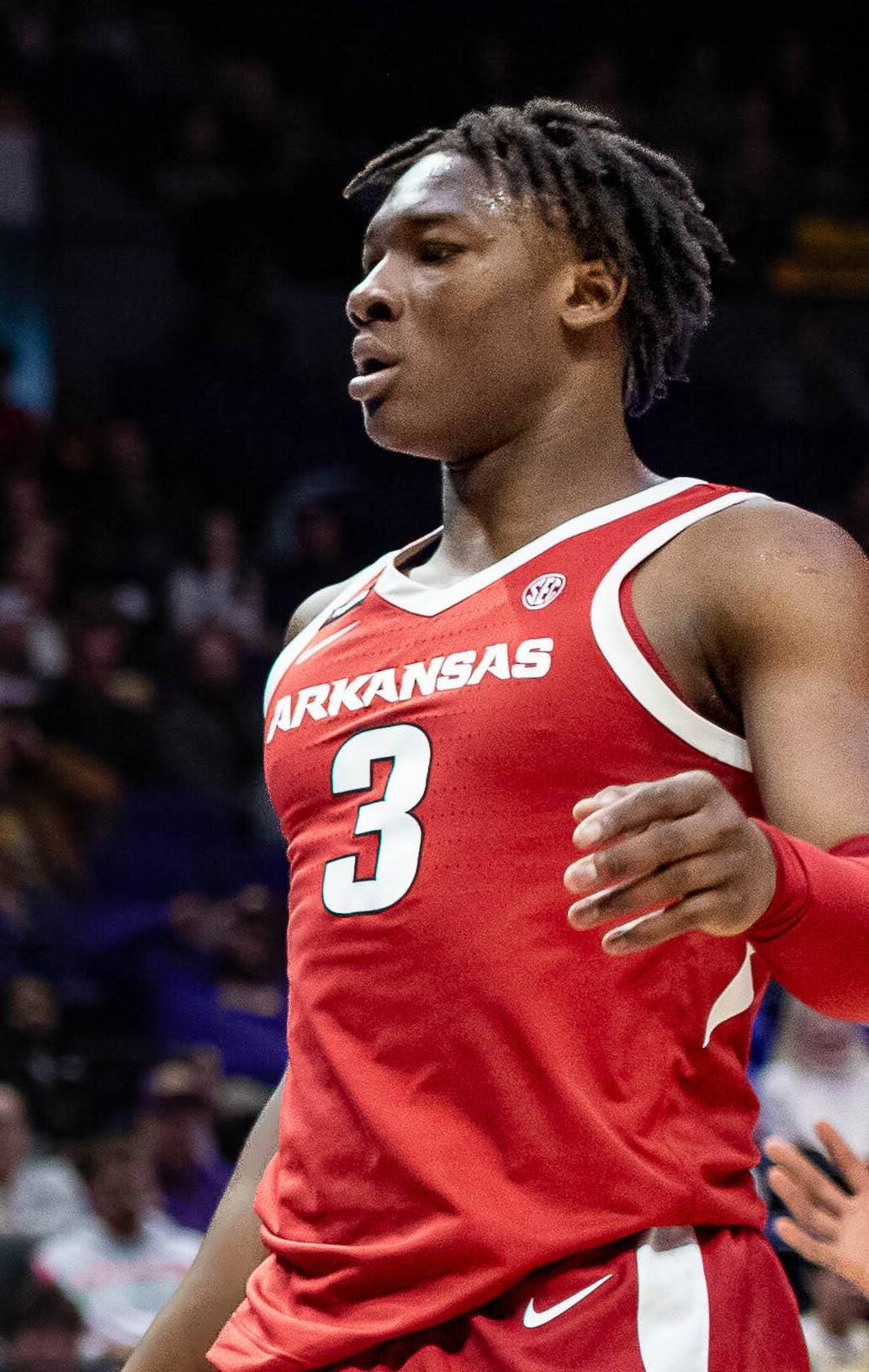
- Thiero with Arkansas in 2025

No. 1 – Los Angeles Lakers
- Position: Small forward / power forward
- League: NBA

Personal information
- Born: May 8, 2004 (age 22) Salt Lake City, Utah, U.S.
- Listed height: 6 ft 7 in (2.01 m)
- Listed weight: 220 lb (100 kg)

Career information
- High school: Quaker Valley (Leetsdale, Pennsylvania)
- College: Kentucky (2022–2024); Arkansas (2024–2025)
- NBA draft: 2025: 2nd round, 36th overall pick
- Drafted by: Brooklyn Nets
- Playing career: 2025–present

Career history
- 2025–present: Los Angeles Lakers
- 2025–2026: →South Bay Lakers
- Stats at NBA.com
- Stats at Basketball Reference

Adou Thiero (born May 8, 2004) is an American professional basketball player for the Los Angeles Lakers of the National Basketball Association (NBA). He played college basketball for the Kentucky Wildcats and the Arkansas Razorbacks.

== Early life and high school career ==
Thiero was born on May 8, 2004, in Salt Lake City, Utah. His parents, Almamy and Mariam, immigrated to the U.S. from Mali and both played college basketball; his father Almamy for Memphis under coach John Calipari and then for Duquesne, while his mother Mariam for Oklahoma City. His mother was selected in the 2006 WNBA draft by the Washington Mystics.

Thiero, born in the U.S., spent his early years in Mali with his grandmother, while his parents played college basketball. In 2007, at age three, he returned to the U.S. He attended Quaker Valley High School in Leetsdale, Pennsylvania, where he played basketball, soccer and lacrosse. A combo guard, he led Quaker Valley in scoring as a sophomore, averaging 17.7 points per game. Then, as a junior in 2020–21, he remained their leading scorer and averaged 21.8 points as well as a team-leading 5.1 assists, 2.2 steals and 1.2 blocks per game.

As a senior, Thiero averaged 23.3 points, 10.3 rebounds, 5.9 assists, 3.9 steals and 2.3 blocks per game, helping the team compile a record of 27–1 while being undefeated in league play; their only loss came in the Pennsylvania Interscholastic Athletic Association (PIAA) championship game. He set a school record with 44 points in a game, finished third in school history with 1,624 career points, and received several honors after his senior season including Western Pennsylvania Interscholastic Athletic League (WPIAL) Player of the Year, TribLive HSSN Boys Basketball Player of the Year, and Pennsylvania Class 4A Player of the Year. He committed to playing college basketball for Kentucky, coached by John Calipari, who had coached his father in college.

== College career ==
=== Kentucky ===
As a freshman at Kentucky in 2022–23, Thiero appeared in 20 games, averaging 9.5 minutes per game, and recorded averages of 2.3 points and 1.9 rebounds. He was the team leader in steals in four games and in blocks in three games. In 2023–24, he saw more playing time, appearing in 25 games, 19 as a starter, while missing eight due to injury. He averaged 7.2 points and five rebounds per game, also totaling 27 blocks which was second on the team. He was Kentucky's leading rebounder in eight games and had five games where he scored double figures; he also posted a double-double in their game against No. 1 ranked Kansas, scoring 16 points and 13 rebounds. After the season, Thiero entered his name in the 2024 NBA draft and the NCAA transfer portal.

=== Arkansas ===
Thiero withdrew from the 2024 NBA draft and transferred to the Arkansas Razorbacks for the 2024–25 season, following coach Calipari from Kentucky. In his lone season at Arkansas, Thiero led the team in scoring, averaging 15.1 points per game. He missed ten games due to an injury, but helped the Razorbacks finish 22–14 overall and make it to the Sweet 16 of the 2025 NCAA Division I men's basketball tournament. He declared for the 2025 NBA draft after the season was over.

== Professional career ==
On June 26, 2025, Thiero was taken in the second round of the 2025 NBA draft by the Brooklyn Nets with the 36th overall pick. He was then traded to the Los Angeles Lakers for the 45th overall pick, which later became Rocco Zikarsky, and cash considerations as part of a seven-team trade involving Kevin Durant. As the season began, he was recovering from knee surgery but on October 29 was sent down to the South Bay Lakers, typically an indication that an injured player is nearing a full recovery. He was recalled by the Lakers on November 2. He made his NBA debut against the Milwaukee Bucks on November 15, 2025, scoring four points and recording a rebound. His first field goal was a dunk during the final minute of the game. When teammate Jarred Vanderbilt attempted to secure the game ball for him after the game ended, officials initially refused to give it to him, insisting that the ball belonged to the Bucks. Eventually, Bucks star Giannis Antetokounmpo intervened and gave the Lakers the ball.

== Career statistics ==
Legend
GP	Games played	GS	Games started	MPG	Minutes per game
FG%	Field goal percentage	3P%	3-point field goal percentage	FT%	Free throw percentage
RPG	Rebounds per game	APG	Assists per game	SPG	Steals per game
BPG	Blocks per game	PPG	Points per game	**Bold**	Career high

=== NBA ===
==== Regular season ====
Year	Team	GP	GS	MPG	FG%	3P%	FT%	RPG	APG	SPG	BPG	PPG
2025–26	L.A. Lakers	25	0	6.0	.516	.333	.636	1.1	.4	.3	.1	1.9
Career		25	0	6.0	.516	.333	.636	1.1	.4	.3	.1	1.9

==== Playoffs ====
Year	Team	GP	GS	MPG	FG%	3P%	FT%	RPG	APG	SPG	BPG	PPG
2026	L.A. Lakers	6	0	5.7	.500	.000	.500	2.0	.2	.0	.0	1.5
Career		6	0	5.7	.500	.000	.500	2.0	.2	.0	.0	1.5

=== College ===
Year	Team	GP	GS	MPG	FG%	3P%	FT%	RPG	APG	SPG	BPG	PPG
2022–23	Kentucky	20	0	9.5	.345	**.333**	.697	1.9	.4	.5	.3	2.3
2023–24	Kentucky	25	19	21.4	.492	.318	**.800**	5.0	1.1	.7	**1.1**	7.2
2024–25	Arkansas	**27**	**26**	**27.5**	**.545**	.256	.686	**5.8**	**1.9**	**1.6**	.7	**15.1**
Career		72	45	20.4	.514	.284	.711	4.4	1.2	1.0	.7	8.8
