= Charles Bassey =

Nigerian basketball player (born 2000)

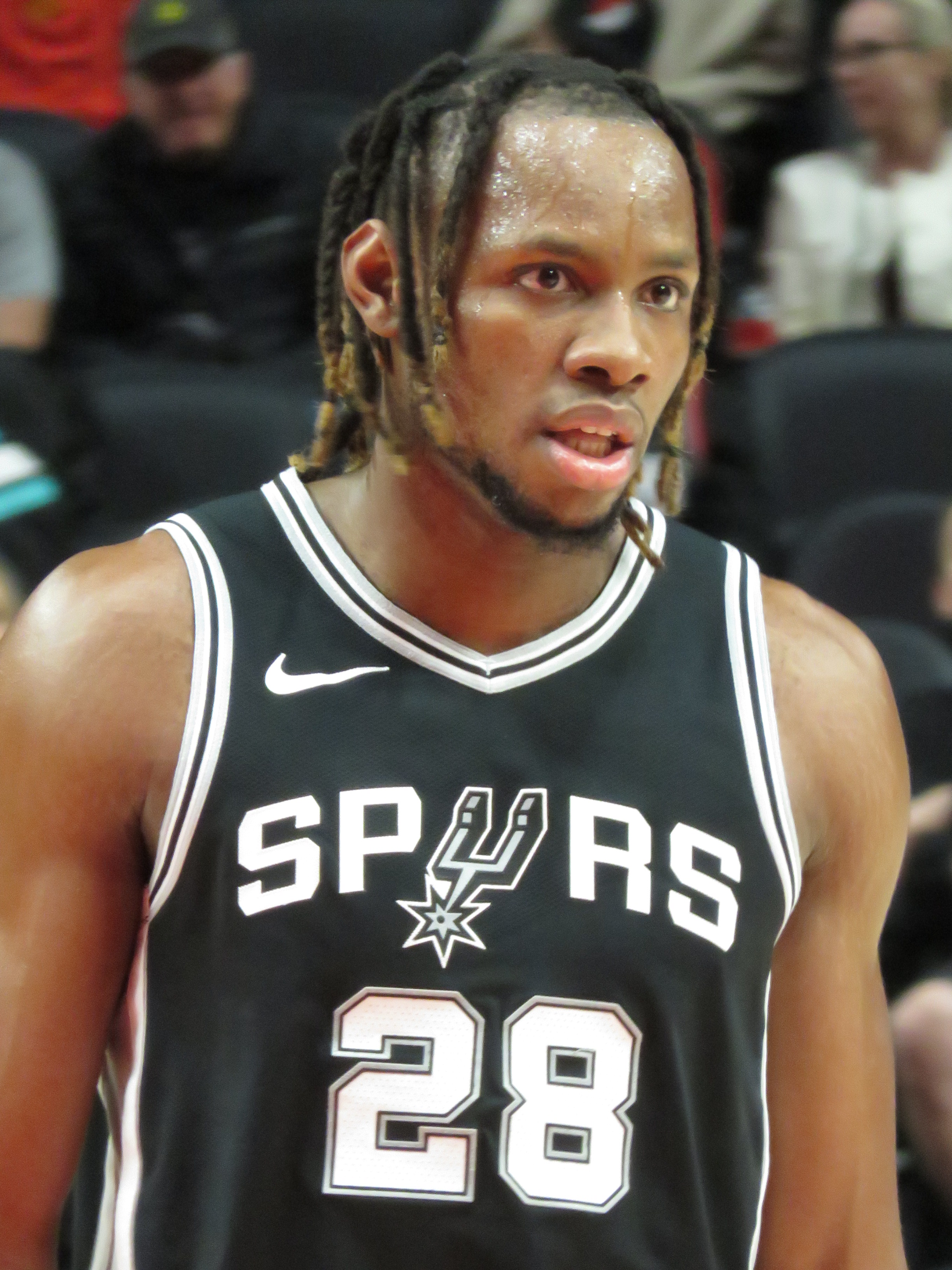
- Bassey with the San Antonio Spurs in 2024

No. 28 – Golden State Warriors
- Position: Center / power forward
- League: NBA

Personal information
- Born: October 28, 2000 (age 26) Lagos, Nigeria
- Listed height: 6 ft 9 in (2.06 m)
- Listed weight: 244 lb (111 kg)

Career information
- High school: St. Anthony (San Antonio, Texas); DeSales (Louisville, Kentucky)
- College: Western Kentucky (2018–2021)
- NBA draft: 2021: 2nd round, 53rd overall pick
- Drafted by: Philadelphia 76ers
- Playing career: 2021–present

Career history
- 2021–2022: Philadelphia 76ers
- 2021–2022: →Delaware Blue Coats
- 2022–2025: San Antonio Spurs
- 2022–2023: →Austin Spurs
- 2025: Memphis Grizzlies
- 2025–2026: Santa Cruz Warriors
- 2026: Philadelphia 76ers
- 2026: →Delaware Blue Coats
- 2026: Santa Cruz Warriors
- 2026: Boston Celtics
- 2026–present: Golden State Warriors

Career highlights
- NBA G League Next Up Game (2023); NBA G League rebounds leader (2026); All-NBA G League Second Team (2022); NBA G League All-Defensive Team (2022); NBA G League All-Rookie Team (2022); Third-team All-American – USBWA (2021); Conference USA Player of the Year (2021); 2× First-team All-Conference USA (2019, 2021); 2× Conference USA Defensive Player of the Year (2019, 2021); Conference USA Freshman of the Year (2019)
- Stats at NBA.com
- Stats at Basketball Reference

Charles Akemini Bassey (born October 28, 2000) is a Nigerian professional basketball player for the Golden State Warriors of the National Basketball Association (NBA). He played college basketball for the Western Kentucky Hilltoppers. He was drafted by the Philadelphia 76ers in the second round of 2021 NBA draft with the 53rd overall pick.

== Early life ==
Bassey was born in Lagos, Nigeria, where he played soccer until age 12, standing 6 feet 1 inch (1.85 m) at the time. At that age, he was discovered by a youth basketball coach while Bassey was selling fried chicken on the side of a road and wearing flip-flops that were too small for him. He stopped playing soccer soon after, instead focusing on developing his basketball skills. At age 14, Bassey was named most valuable player (MVP) of basketball camp Giants of Africa, a program established by Toronto Raptors executive Masai Ujiri.

== High school career ==
At age 14, Bassey stood 6 feet 10 inches (2.08 m) and moved to the United States to continue his basketball career at St. Anthony Catholic High School, a private school in San Antonio, Texas. By then, recruiting analysts considered him one of the best prospects in his class. As a freshman, Bassey averaged 20.2 points, 17.1 rebounds and 5.9 blocks per game, leading his team to the Texas Association of Private and Parochial Schools (TAPPS) title game. Bassey competed in the Jordan Brand Classic International Game, where he was named MVP. Before his sophomore season, Bassey was ruled ineligible by the TAPPS, with St. Anthony filing an appeal. He still made his season debut, and head coach Jeff Merritt was fired for playing an ineligible player. St. Anthony withdrew from the TAPPS and joined the Texas Christian Athletic League, allowing Bassey to become eligible again.

For his junior season, Bassey transferred to DeSales High School in Louisville, Kentucky and began playing basketball for Aspire Basketball Academy in Louisville. He made the decision after Hennssy Auriantal, his legal guardian and an assistant coach at St. Anthony, was dismissed from the program. As a junior, he averaged 19.4 points and 12.8 rebounds per game.

=== Recruiting ===
Bassey was a consensus five-star recruit and one of the top centers in the 2018 class. On June 13, 2018, he reclassified to the 2018 class and committed to playing college basketball for Western Kentucky.

College recruiting
Name	Hometown	School	Height	Weight	Commit date
Charles Bassey; C	Lagos, Nigeria	Aspire Academy (KY)	6 ft 10 in (2.08 m)	220 lb (100 kg)	Jun 13, 2018
Charles Bassey; C	Recruit ratings: Rivals: 247Sports: ESPN: (92)				
Overall recruit ranking: Rivals: 9 247Sports: 9 ESPN: 18
Note: In many cases, Scout, Rivals, 247Sports, On3, and ESPN may conflict in their listings of height and weight.; In these cases, the average was taken. ESPN grades are on a 100-point scale.; Sources: "Western Kentucky 2018 Basketball Commitments". Rivals.; "2018 Western Kentucky Hilltoppers Recruiting Class". ESPN.; "2018 Team Ranking". Rivals.

== College career ==
On November 18, 2018, Bassey recorded a freshman season-high 25 points and 10 rebounds in a 78–62 loss to UCF. On January 31, 2019, he posted 22 points and 18 rebounds, the most rebounds by a Western Kentucky freshman since 1972. As a freshman, Bassey averaged 14.6 points, 10 rebounds and 2.4 blocks per game, earning First Team All-Conference USA, Defensive Player of the Year and Freshman of the Year honors. He recorded the most rebounds, blocks and double-doubles by a freshman in program history. Bassey's sophomore season was cut short by a tibial plateau fracture he suffered against Arkansas that required surgery. Through 10 games, he was averaging 15.3 points, 9.2 rebounds and 1.6 blocks per game.

On November 26, 2020, Bassey recorded 21 points, 14 rebounds and a career-high seven blocks in a 75–69 win over Memphis. On December 10, he had a career-high 29 points and 14 rebounds in an 86–84 victory over Gardner–Webb. At the close of the 2020–21 regular season, he was named the Conference USA Player of the Year, while repeating as the league's Defensive Player of the Year. He averaged 17.6 points per game, 11.6 rebounds and 3.1 blocks per game. Following the season, he declared for the 2021 NBA draft, forgoing his remaining college eligibility.

== Professional career ==
=== Philadelphia 76ers (2021–2022) ===
Bassey was selected in the second round of the 2021 NBA draft with the 53rd pick by the Philadelphia 76ers, subsequently joining them for the 2021 NBA Summer League. On September 24, 2021, he signed with the 76ers.

On October 13, 2022, Bassey was waived by the 76ers.

=== San Antonio Spurs (2022–2025) ===
On October 24, 2022, the San Antonio Spurs announced that they had signed Bassey to a two-way contract, splitting time with the Spurs' NBA G League affiliate, the Austin Spurs. He was named to the G League's inaugural Next Up Game for the 2022–23 season. On February 14, 2023, the Spurs converted Bassey's deal to a four-year, $10.2 million standard contract. On March 14, during a 132–114 win over the Orlando Magic, he suffered a left knee injury. The next day, the Spurs announced that Bassey was diagnosed with a non-displaced fracture of his left patella, ending his season. In December 2023, Bassey tore his left anterior cruciate ligament (ACL), prematurely ending another season. On July 8, 2024, Bassey was waived by the Spurs only to be re-signed nine days later.

On July 11, 2025, Bassey played for the Boston Celtics in the 2025 NBA Summer League. On September 10, Bassey signed with the Atlanta Hawks. He was waived prior to the start of the regular season on October 18.

=== Memphis Grizzlies (2025) ===
On October 26, 2025, the Memphis Grizzlies signed Bassey to a 10-day hardship contract. Bassey made two appearances for Memphis, averaging 3.5 points, 7.5 rebounds, and 1.0 assist.

=== Santa Cruz Warriors (2025–2026) ===
On December 27, 2025, Bassey signed with the Santa Cruz Warriors of the NBA G League.

=== Second stint with Philadelphia 76ers (2026) ===
On January 26, 2026, Bassey signed a 10-day contract with the Philadelphia 76ers. On February 5, Bassey signed another 10-day contract with the 76ers. He made one appearance for the team, recording two points and one block. Upon the expiration of his second 10-day deal, Bassey returned to Santa Cruz.

=== Boston Celtics ===
On March 15, 2026, Bassey signed a 10-day contract with the Boston Celtics. On March 25, Bassey signed another 10-day contract with the Celtics. In five total appearances for Boston, he averaged 2.8 points and 1.2 rebounds.

=== Golden State Warriors (2026–present) ===
On April 5, 2026, Bassey signed a contract with the Golden State Warriors for the rest of the season. On April 7, he recorded 14 points, 12 rebounds, two steals, and two blocks in a 110–105 victory over the Sacramento Kings.

On July 9, 2026, Bassey re-signed with the Warriors on a one–year contract.

== Career statistics ==
Legend
GP	Games played	GS	Games started	MPG	Minutes per game
FG%	Field goal percentage	3P%	3-point field goal percentage	FT%	Free throw percentage
RPG	Rebounds per game	APG	Assists per game	SPG	Steals per game
BPG	Blocks per game	PPG	Points per game	**Bold**	Career high

=== NBA ===
==== Regular season ====
Year	Team	GP	GS	MPG	FG%	3P%	FT%	RPG	APG	SPG	BPG	PPG
2021–22	Philadelphia	23	0	7.3	.638	.000	.750	2.7	.3	.2	.7	3.0
2022–23	San Antonio	35	**2**	14.5	.644	**.375**	.595	5.5	**1.4**	**.5**	.9	5.7
2023–24	San Antonio	19	0	10.8	.725	.000	.833	4.0	1.1	.4	.9	3.3
2024–25	San Antonio	**36**	1	10.4	.581	–	.636	4.2	.5	.4	.8	4.4
2025–26	Memphis	2	0	15.5	.375	.000	.333	**7.5**	1.0	**.5**	.5	3.5
2025–26	Philadelphia	1	0	5.0	**1.000**	.000	.000	.0	.0	.0	1.0	2.0
2025–26	Boston	5	0	3.4	.857	–	.500	1.2	.0	.2	.4	2.8
2025–26	Golden State	5	0	**20.0**	.677	–	**.846**	7.2	1.0	.4	**1.4**	**10.6**
Career		126	3	11.2	.635	.231	.657	4.3	.8	.4	.9	4.5

==== Playoffs ====
Year	Team	GP	GS	MPG	FG%	3P%	FT%	RPG	APG	SPG	BPG	PPG
2022	Philadelphia	3	0	4.0	.500	—	.000	1.7	.3	.0	.3	.7
Career		3	0	4.0	.500	—	.000	1.7	.3	.0	.3	.7

=== College ===
Year	Team	GP	GS	MPG	FG%	3P%	FT%	RPG	APG	SPG	BPG	PPG
2018–19	Western Kentucky	**34**	**34**	**31.4**	**.627**	**.450**	.769	10.0	.7	**.8**	2.4	14.6
2019–20	Western Kentucky	10	10	28.1	.533	.167	**.787**	9.2	**1.3**	**.8**	1.6	15.3
2020–21	Western Kentucky	28	28	30.4	.590	.305	.759	**11.6**	.7	.4	**3.1**	**17.6**
Career		72	72	30.5	.596	.319	.768	10.5	.8	.6	2.6	15.9

== Personal life ==
Shortly after arriving in the United States at age 14, Bassey's mother died. At the time, Bassey considered moving back to Nigeria, but his father Akpan Ebong Bassey encouraged him to stay for financial reasons.

Canadian-born basketball coach, Hennssy Auriantal, who runs the Yes II Success organization that brings international players to American private schools, helped bring Bassey to the United States. On March 31, 2017, Auriantal and his wife were granted conservatorship over Bassey. Bassey's father later filed a petition to reopen the case and give Nigerian basketball tournament organizer John Faniran custody over his son, but the petition was dropped due to lack of verification.
