= Dylan Cardwell =

American basketball player (born 2001)

No. 32 – Sacramento Kings
- Position: Center
- League: NBA

Personal information
- Born: December 16, 2001 (age 24) Augusta, Georgia, U.S.
- Listed height: 6 ft 10 in (2.08 m)
- Listed weight: 255 lb (116 kg)

Career information
- High school: Oak Hill Academy (Mouth of Wilson, Virginia); McEachern (Powder Springs, Georgia)
- College: Auburn (2020–2025)
- NBA draft: 2025: undrafted
- Playing career: 2025–present

Career history
- 2025–present: Sacramento Kings
- 2025–2026: →Stockton Kings
- Stats at NBA.com
- Stats at Basketball Reference

Dylan Cardwell (born December 16, 2001) is an American professional basketball player for the Sacramento Kings of the National Basketball Association (NBA). He played college basketball for the Auburn Tigers.

== Early life and high school ==
Cardwell attended Oak Hill Academy up to his junior season before transferring to McEachern High School for his senior year. As a junior he averaged 3.8 points and 3.8 rebounds per game. Coming out of high school, Cardwell was rated as a three-star recruit and committed to play college basketball for the Auburn Tigers over other schools such as Georgia, Tennessee, Miami, Maryland and UConn.

== College career ==
As a freshman in 2020–21, Cardwell appeared in 27 games where he averaged 3.8 points and 3.6 rebounds in 15.2 minutes per game. On January 11, 2022, he tallied six points, six rebounds and four blocks in a win over rival Alabama. During the 2021–22 season, Cardwell appeared in all 34 games and averaged three points and three rebounds. In the first two games of the 2022–23 season, he put up nine points and ten blocks. In the 2022–23 season, Cardwell averaged 3.7 points and 3.8 rebounds in 32 appearances. In 2023–24, he averaged 5.3 points, 1.6 blocks and 1.2 assists in 14.7 minutes per game. Heading into the 2024–25 season, Cardwell become a full-time starter for the first time. On December 30, 2024, he posted 12 points, 11 rebounds, two blocks and a steal in a win over Monmouth. On March 1, 2025, Cardwell become the all-time winningest player in Auburn men’s basketball history, with 115 wins after he helped the Tigers to a 94–78 win over Kentucky.

== Professional career ==
On June 26, 2025 after being undrafted in the 2025 NBA draft, Cardwell signed a two-way contract with the Sacramento Kings.

On February 6, 2026, the Kings signed Cardwell to a four-year, $8.3 million standard contract after trading Dennis Schroder, Keon Ellis and Dario Šarić as part of a three-team deal that brought De'Andre Hunter to Sacramento. At the time of the signing, Cardwell was leading his rookie class in blocks per game, and he led all rookies in rebounds per game in the same month. Cardwell recorded a career-high 15 points against the Los Angeles Clippers on April 5th, 2026, alongside four blocks.

== Career statistics ==
Legend
GP	Games played	GS	Games started	MPG	Minutes per game
FG%	Field goal percentage	3P%	3-point field goal percentage	FT%	Free throw percentage
RPG	Rebounds per game	APG	Assists per game	SPG	Steals per game
BPG	Blocks per game	PPG	Points per game	**Bold**	Career high

=== NBA ===
Year	Team	GP	GS	MPG	FG%	3P%	FT%	RPG	APG	SPG	BPG	PPG
2025–26	Sacramento	44	1	20.6	.587	.500	.510	7.5	1.4	.7	1.5	5.4
Career		44	1	20.6	.587	.500	.510	7.5	1.4	.7	1.5	5.4

=== College ===
Year	Team	GP	GS	MPG	FG%	3P%	FT%	RPG	APG	SPG	BPG	PPG
2020–21	Auburn	27	1	15.1	.705	**1.000**	.571	3.6	.5	.4	.6	3.8
2021–22	Auburn	34	0	11.5	.690	.000	.400	3.0	.5	.5	1.2	3.0
2022–23	Auburn	32	1	13.4	.**747**	.000	.318	3.8	1.1	.3	1.3	3.7
2023–24	Auburn	35	1	14.5	.709	.400	**.587**	3.7	1.2	.6	**1.6**	**5.3**
2024–25	Auburn	**38**	**38**	**20.3**	.700	.500	.324	**5.1**	**1.6**	**.8**	1.4	5.0
Career		166	41	15.1	.709	.400	.450	3.9	1.2	.6	1.3	4.2
