= Devin Carter =

American basketball player (born 2002)

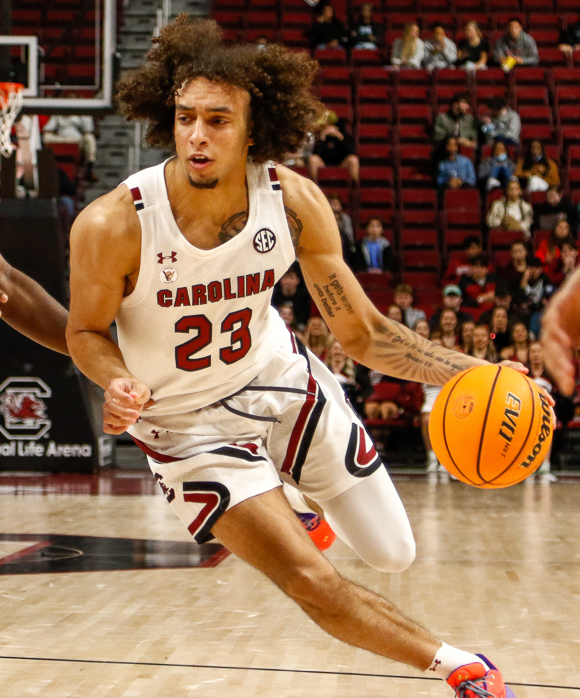
- Carter with South Carolina in 2021

No. 99 – Boston Celtics
- Position: Shooting guard / point guard
- League: NBA

Personal information
- Born: March 18, 2002 (age 24) Miami, Florida, U.S.
- Listed height: 6 ft 2 in (1.88 m)
- Listed weight: 199 lb (90 kg)

Career information
- High school: Cherry Creek (Greenwood Village, Colorado); Doral Academy (Doral, Florida); Brewster Academy (Wolfeboro, New Hampshire)
- College: South Carolina (2021–2022); Providence (2022–2024)
- NBA draft: 2024: 1st round, 13th overall pick
- Drafted by: Sacramento Kings
- Playing career: 2024–present

Career history
- 2024–2026: Sacramento Kings
- 2024–2025: →Stockton Kings
- 2026–present: Boston Celtics
- 2026–present: →Maine Celtics

Career highlights
- Big East Player of the Year (2024); First-team All-Big East (2024); SEC All-Freshman team (2022)
- Stats at NBA.com
- Stats at Basketball Reference

Devin Carter (born March 18, 2002) is an American professional basketball player for the Boston Celtics of the National Basketball Association (NBA), on a two-way contract with the Maine Celtics of the NBA G League. He played college basketball for the South Carolina Gamecocks and Providence Friars. Carter was selected with the 13th overall pick in the 2024 NBA draft by the Sacramento Kings.

== Early life and high school career ==
Carter initially attended Cherry Creek High School in Greenwood Village, Colorado. He transferred to Doral Academy Preparatory School in Doral, Florida, after his freshman year, when his family relocated to Florida following his father, Anthony Carter, being hired as a player development coach for the Miami Heat. Carter's senior season was cut short due to a shoulder injury, and he opted to enroll at Brewster Academy in Wolfeboro, New Hampshire, for a postgraduate year. Carter was rated a three-star recruit and committed to playing college basketball for South Carolina during his senior year at Doral Academy.

== College career ==
=== South Carolina ===
On December 13, 2021, Carter was named SEC Freshman of the Week. He helped South Carolina to a 66–65 win over Florida State. He led the team with 16 points, which tied his career high, and 7 rebounds. On March 8, 2022, Carter was named to the SEC All-Freshman team. He became the 13th Gamecock to be named to the SEC All-Freshman squad. He joined Michael Carrera, Sindarius Thornwell, A. J. Lawson and Jermaine Couisnard. Carter played in 30 games during the 2021–22 season and started in seven of them. He averaged 9 points and 3.8 rebounds during the season.

=== Providence ===
As a sophomore, Carter transferred to Providence. He averaged 13 points and 4.9 rebounds in his first season with the Friars.

In his second season at Providence, under first-year head coach Kim English, Carter won both Big East First Team and Big East Player of the Year. He averaged nearly 20 points and 9 rebounds per game, establishing himself as one of the best players in college basketball. His outstanding scoring ability, tenacious defense and high motor impressed NBA scouts throughout his junior season.

== Professional career ==
=== Sacramento Kings (2024–2026) ===
On June 26, 2024, Carter was selected with the thirteenth overall pick by the Sacramento Kings in the 2024 NBA draft and on July 9, he signed with the Kings. Throughout his rookie season, he was assigned several times to the Stockton Kings. On January 3, 2025, Carter made his NBA debut against the Memphis Grizzlies and his father Anthony, an assistant coach for the Grizzlies. He recorded no points, five rebounds, and two assists.

On October 14, 2025, the Kings exercised the third-year option on Carter. On March 10, 2026, Carter recorded a career-high 24 points in a 114–109 victory over the Indiana Pacers. On April 10, Carter increased his career high to 29 points, also setting career highs in rebounds (nine) and three-pointers (six) during a 124–118 win over the Golden State Warriors.

On June 30, 2026, Carter and a 2033 second-round pick were traded to the Atlanta Hawks in exchange for the draft rights to Alpha Kaba. On September 11, Carter was waived by the Hawks.

=== Boston Celtics (2026–present) ===
On September 15, 2026, Carter signed with Boston Celtics on an Exhibit 10 contract. On October 18, he was converted to a two-way contract.

== Personal life ==
Carter is the son of Anthony Carter and Cassie Carter. He has one brother named Joshua.

== Career statistics ==
Legend
| GP | Games played | GS | Games started | MPG | Minutes per game |
| FG% | Field goal percentage | 3P% | 3-point field goal percentage | FT% | Free throw percentage |
| RPG | Rebounds per game | APG | Assists per game | SPG | Steals per game |
| BPG | Blocks per game | PPG | Points per game | **Bold** | Career high |

=== NBA ===
| Year | Team | GP | GS | MPG | FG% | 3P% | FT% | RPG | APG | SPG | BPG | PPG |
|---|---|---|---|---|---|---|---|---|---|---|---|---|
| 2024–25 | Sacramento | 36 | 0 | 11.0 | .370 | **.295** | .591 | 2.1 | 1.1 | .6 | .1 | 3.8 |
| 2025–26 | Sacramento | **38** | **12** | **18.4** | **.414** | .263 | **.713** | **3.3** | **2.7** | **.9** | **.2** | **8.9** |
| Career | | 74 | 12 | 14.8 | .401 | .274 | .674 | 2.7 | 1.9 | .7 | .2 | 6.4 |

=== College ===
| Year | Team | GP | GS | MPG | FG% | 3P% | FT% | RPG | APG | SPG | BPG | PPG |
|---|---|---|---|---|---|---|---|---|---|---|---|---|
| 2021–22 | South Carolina | 30 | 7 | 18.7 | .420 | .267 | .688 | 3.8 | 1.8 | .9 | .3 | 9.0 |
| 2022–23 | Providence | **33** | **33** | 32.0 | .427 | .299 | .720 | 4.9 | 2.5 | **1.8** | **1.1** | 13.0 |
| 2023–24 | Providence | **33** | **33** | **35.3** | **.473** | **.377** | **.749** | **8.7** | **3.6** | **1.8** | 1.0 | **19.7** |
| Career | | 96 | 73 | 29.0 | .447 | .338 | .723 | 5.9 | 2.7 | 1.5 | .8 | 14.1 |

== See also ==
- List of second-generation NBA players
