= De'Andre Hunter =

American basketball player (born 1997)

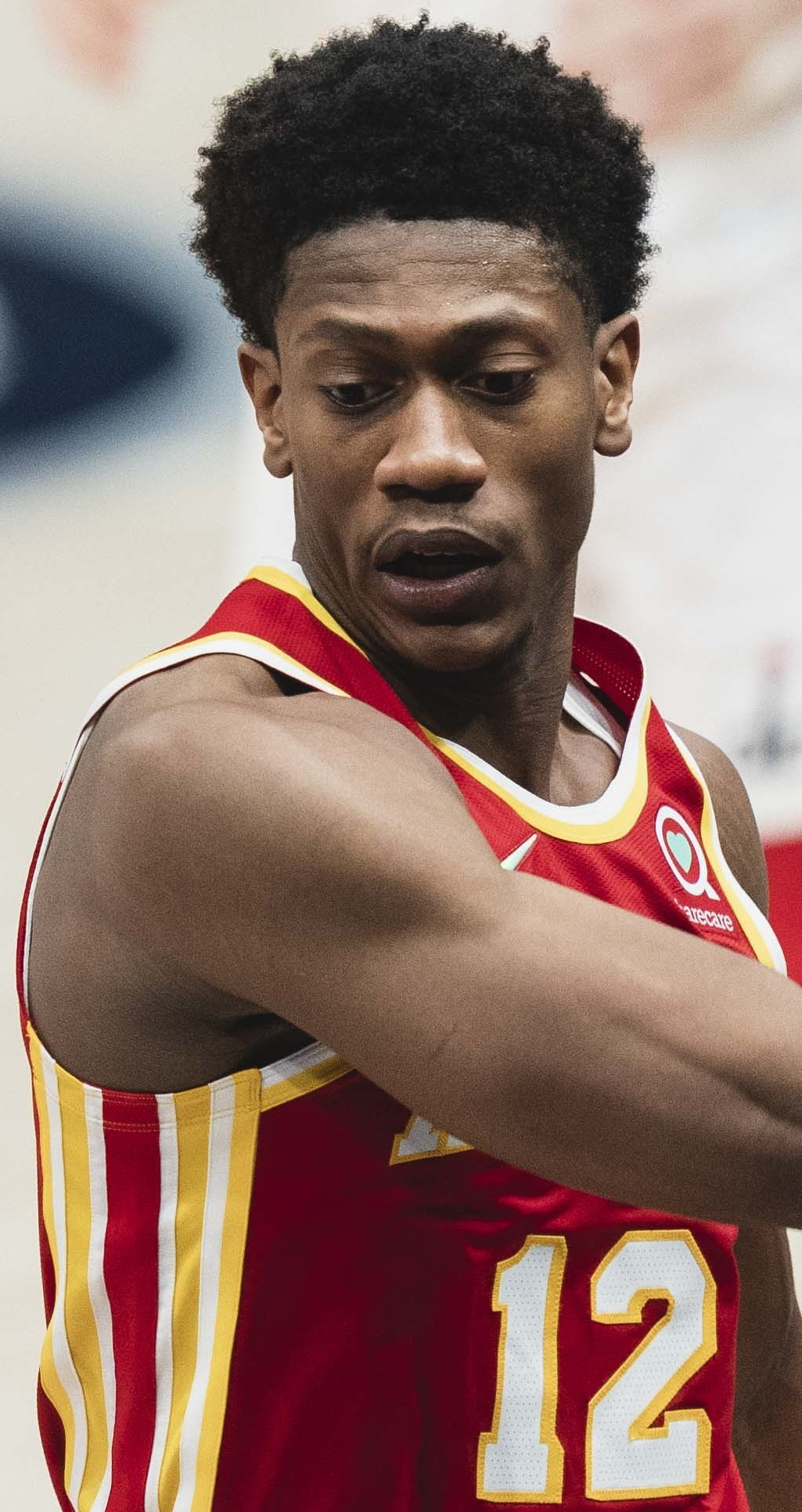
- Hunter with the Atlanta Hawks in 2021

No. 15 – Sacramento Kings
- Position: Small forward / shooting guard
- League: NBA

Personal information
- Born: December 2, 1997 (age 28) Philadelphia, Pennsylvania, U.S.
- Listed height: 6 ft 7 in (2.01 m)
- Listed weight: 221 lb (100 kg)

Career information
- High school: Friends' Central School (Wynnewood, Pennsylvania)
- College: Virginia (2017–2019)
- NBA draft: 2019: 1st round, 4th overall pick
- Drafted by: Los Angeles Lakers
- Playing career: 2019–present

Career history
- 2019–2025: Atlanta Hawks
- 2025–2026: Cleveland Cavaliers
- 2026–present: Sacramento Kings

Career highlights
- NCAA champion (2019); Second-team All-American – NABC (2019); Third-team All-American – AP, USBWA, SN (2019); NABC Defensive Player of the Year (2019); First-team All-ACC (2019); ACC Defensive Player of the Year (2019); ACC Sixth Man of the Year (2018); ACC All-Freshman Team (2018)
- Stats at NBA.com
- Stats at Basketball Reference

De'Andre James Hunter (born December 2, 1997) is an American professional basketball player for the Sacramento Kings of the National Basketball Association (NBA). He played college basketball for the Virginia Cavaliers and was named the NABC Defensive Player of the Year for 2019.

Hunter was selected in the 2019 NBA draft with the 4th overall pick by the Los Angeles Lakers, but was then traded to the New Orleans Pelicans before being traded again to the Atlanta Hawks on draft night. He was traded during his sixth season with Atlanta to the Cleveland Cavaliers and was traded again during the following season to the Sacramento Kings.

== High school career ==
Hunter grew up in Lawncrest, Philadelphia and attended Friends' Central School in Wynnewood, Pennsylvania. As a junior, he averaged 21.6 points, 11.0 rebounds, and 5.0 assists per game, while being named Pennsylvania Class AA Player of the Year. As a senior in 2016, Hunter averaged 23.5 points, 9.8 rebounds, 3.0 assists and 2.5 blocks per game. Hunter was rated as a four-star recruit and ranked as the 72nd overall recruit and 14th best small forward in the 2016 high school class.

On September 12, 2015, Hunter committed to Virginia, choosing UVA over other offers from NC State and Notre Dame.

== College career ==
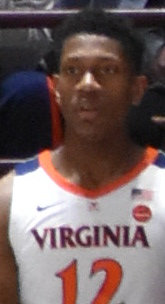
Hunter with Virginia in 2019

During his redshirt freshman season, Hunter scored double figures in 16 games, including in 11 conference games. During a game against Louisville, Hunter scored the final 3 pointer to win the game at the buzzer. Hunter broke his wrist during the 2018 ACC tournament and could not play in the 2018 NCAA tournament. Without Hunter, the number 1 seed Virginia went on to lose in the first round to the number 16 seed, UMBC. After this season, Hunter was named to the All-ACC All-Freshman team, as well as being named the ACC Sixth man of the year. In his freshman season, Hunter posted 9.2 points and 3.5 rebounds per game. Hunter later announced that he would return to Virginia for the 2018–2019 season despite speculation that he could declare for the 2018 NBA draft.

In his sophomore season, Hunter averaged 15.2 points per game and 5.1 rebounds per game. He helped lead Virginia to another #1 seed in the 2019 NCAA tournament. Virginia would win the 2019 Championship game 85–77 behind Hunter's 27 points and 9 rebounds, including a game-tying 3 with 12.9 seconds left in regulation.

Following his second season, Hunter announced his intention to forgo his final two seasons of collegiate eligibility and declare for the 2019 NBA draft, where he was taken 4th overall by the Los Angeles Lakers and later traded to the Atlanta Hawks.

== Professional career ==
=== Atlanta Hawks (2019–2025) ===
On June 20, 2019, Hunter was drafted by the Los Angeles Lakers with the fourth overall pick in the 2019 NBA draft, then traded to the New Orleans Pelicans in the Anthony Davis trade, and then again to the Atlanta Hawks along with Solomon Hill for picks Nos. 8, 17, and 35 in the 2019 NBA draft. On July 7, the Atlanta Hawks announced that they had signed Hunter. On October 24, Hunter made his NBA debut, starting in a 117–100 win over the Detroit Pistons and finishing with 14 points and two rebounds.

Hunter began the 2020–21 season in the starting lineup for the Hawks.

On January 24, 2021, Hunter recorded a then-career-high of 33 points against the Milwaukee Bucks. On February 7, the Hawks announced that Hunter would undergo arthroscopic surgery on his right knee and would be out for an extended period of time. Going into the All-Star break, Hunter posted averages of 17.2 points per game and 5.4 rebounds per game, leading to the NBA naming him to the Rising Stars roster. On June 9, the Hawks announced that Hunter would undergo surgery to repair a torn meniscus in his right knee and would be out for the rest of the season.

On April 26, 2022, Hunter scored a career-high of 35 points and grabbed 11 rebounds. Despite his effort, the Hawks would lose the game 97–94 against the Miami Heat, eliminating them from the playoffs in five games.

On October 17, 2022, Hunter agreed on a four-year, $95 million contract extension with the Hawks. On January 13, 2023, Hunter scored 26 points on a career-high six three-pointers made in a 113–111 win over the Indiana Pacers.

On January 27, 2025, Hunter matched his career-high of 35 points in a 100–92 loss to the Minnesota Timberwolves.

=== Cleveland Cavaliers (2025–2026) ===
On February 6, 2025, Hunter was traded to the Cleveland Cavaliers in exchange for Caris LeVert, Georges Niang, three second round picks, and two pick swaps. He made 27 appearances (five starts) for Cleveland over the remainder of the season, posting averages of 14.3 points, 4.2 rebounds, and 1.3 assists.

On November 8, 2025, in a 128-122 win over the Chicago Bulls, Hunter received extensive media coverage for a play where he crossed over Josh Giddey, causing Giddey to fall to the floor, and then finished with a two-handed dunk over Patrick Williams in the third quarter of the game. Hunter finished the game with 29 points on 10-for-16 shooting, making 4-8 three-point attempts. He made 43 appearances (including 23 starts) for the Cavaliers during the 2025–26 NBA season, averaging 14.0 points, 4.2 rebounds, and 2.1 assists.

=== Sacramento Kings (2026–present) ===
On February 1, 2026, Hunter was traded to the Sacramento Kings in a three-team trade involving the Chicago Bulls which sent Emanuel Miller, Dennis Schröder and Keon Ellis to Cleveland. In his second game with Sacramento on February 6, Hunter departed the contest after being inadvertently poked in the left eye by Los Angeles Clippers guard Kobe Sanders; he was subsequently diagnosed with retinal detachment. On February 20, it was announced that Hunter would require season-ending surgery to address the malady.

== Career statistics ==
Legend
GP	Games played	GS	Games started	MPG	Minutes per game
FG%	Field goal percentage	3P%	3-point field goal percentage	FT%	Free throw percentage
RPG	Rebounds per game	APG	Assists per game	SPG	Steals per game
BPG	Blocks per game	PPG	Points per game	**Bold**	Career high

=== NBA ===
==== Regular season ====
Year	Team	GP	GS	MPG	FG%	3P%	FT%	RPG	APG	SPG	BPG	PPG
2019–20	Atlanta	63	62	**32.0**	.410	.355	.764	4.5	1.8	.7	.3	12.3
2020–21	Atlanta	23	19	29.5	.484	.326	**.859**	**4.8**	1.9	**.8**	**.5**	15.0
2021–22	Atlanta	53	52	29.8	.442	.379	.765	3.3	1.3	.7	.4	13.4
2022–23	Atlanta	**67**	**67**	31.7	.461	.350	.826	4.2	1.4	.5	.3	15.4
2023–24	Atlanta	57	37	29.5	.459	.385	.847	3.9	1.5	.7	.3	15.6
2024–25	Atlanta	37	4	28.7	.461	.393	.858	3.9	1.5	**.8**	.1	**19.0**
2024–25	Cleveland	27	5	25.0	**.485**	**.426**	.821	4.2	1.3	.7	.3	14.3
2025–26	Cleveland	43	23	26.2	.423	.308	**.869**	4.2	**2.1**	.7	.1	14.0
2025–26	Sacramento	2	2	25.5	.211	.222	.833	1.5	.5	.0	.0	7.5
Career		372	271	29.6	.447	.364	.825	4.1	1.6	.7	.3	14.7

==== Playoffs ====
Year	Team	GP	GS	MPG	FG%	3P%	FT%	RPG	APG	SPG	BPG	PPG
2021	Atlanta	5	5	30.4	.400	.375	.750	4.0	.6	.2	**.6**	10.8
2022	Atlanta	5	5	34.9	**.557**	**.462**	.800	3.8	.6	**.8**	.2	**21.2**
2023	Atlanta	6	**6**	**37.4**	.459	.368	.800	**5.7**	**1.2**	.7	.3	16.7
2025	Cleveland	**8**	0	23.1	.429	**.462**	**.846**	3.6	1.0	.5	.1	11.0
Career		24	16	30.6	.468	.415	.806	4.3	.9	.5	.3	14.5

=== College ===
Year	Team	GP	GS	MPG	FG%	3P%	FT%	RPG	APG	SPG	BPG	PPG
2016–17	Virginia	Redshirt										
2017–18	Virginia	33	0	19.9	.488	.382	.755	3.5	1.1	**.6**	.4	9.2
2018–19	Virginia	**38**	**38**	**32.5**	**.520**	**.438**	**.783**	**5.1**	**2.0**	**.6**	**.6**	**15.2**
Career		71	38	26.6	.509	.419	.773	4.4	1.6	.6	.5	12.4
