= Maxime Raynaud =

French basketball player (born 2003)

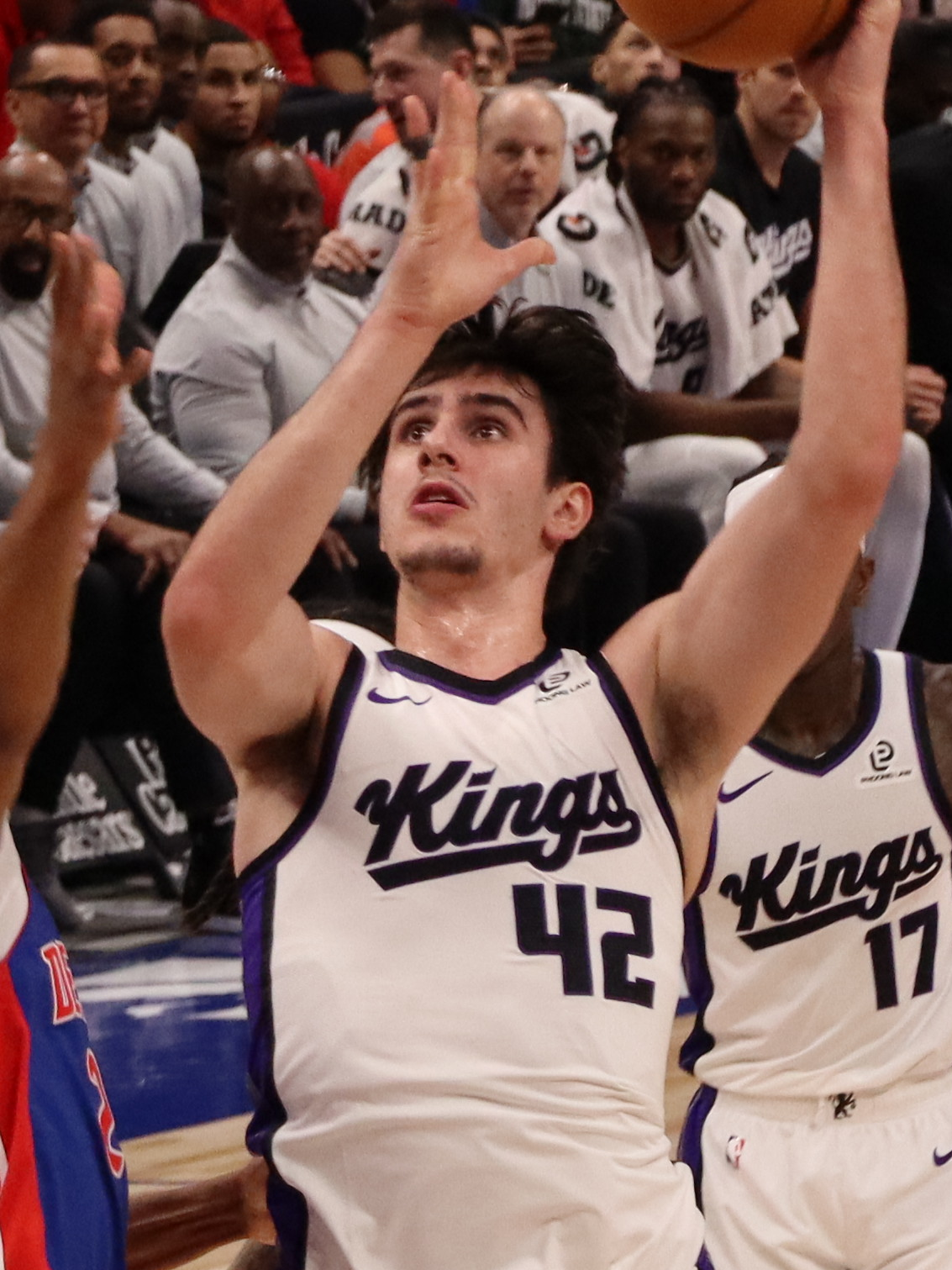
- Raynaud with the Sacramento Kings in 2026

No. 42 – Sacramento Kings
- Position: Center
- League: NBA

Personal information
- Born: 7 April 2003 (age 23) Paris, France
- Listed height: 7 ft 1 in (2.16 m)
- Listed weight: 268 lb (122 kg)

Career information
- High school: Lycée Henri-IV (Paris, France)
- College: Stanford (2021–2025)
- NBA draft: 2025: 2nd round, 42nd overall pick
- Drafted by: Sacramento Kings
- Playing career: 2020–present

Career history
- 2020–2021: Nanterre 92
- 2025–present: Sacramento Kings
- 2025: →Stockton Kings

Career highlights
- NBA All-Rookie Second Team (2026); First-team All-ACC (2025); Second-team All-Pac-12 (2024); Pac-12 Most Improved Player (2024)
- Stats at NBA.com
- Stats at Basketball Reference
Medals
Men's basketball
Representing France
FIBA U20 European Championship
Gold medal – first place	2023 Greece	Team
FIBA U16 European Championship
Silver medal – second place	2019 Italy	Team

Maxime Pierre Raynaud (born 7 April 2003) is a French professional basketball player for the Sacramento Kings of the National Basketball Association (NBA). He played college basketball for the Stanford Cardinal.

== College career ==
Raynaud graduated from Lycée Henri-IV in his native Paris. Seeking to play college basketball in the United States, Raynaud committed to the Stanford Cardinal. He established himself as a part of the Cardinal rotation under coach Jerod Haase in his first two seasons. As a junior in the 2023–24 season, Raynaud saw an increase in his productivity, averaging 15.5 points and 9.6 rebounds per game. He was named second-team All-Pac-12 and the Most Improved Player in the conference.

With the firing of Haase at the close of the season, Raynaud entered the transfer portal and considered leaving Stanford, but ultimately chose to remain and play for new coach Kyle Smith in Stanford's inaugural season in the Atlantic Coast Conference. At the close of the season, Raynaud was named the recipient of the Skip Prosser Award for top scholar-athlete in the ACC. At the conclusion of the season, Raynaud was also named recipient of the Skip Prosser Award, recognizing the ACC’s top scholar-athlete. Raynaud graduated with a double major in Mathematics and Computer Science.

== Professional career ==
Raynaud was selected 42nd overall in the 2025 NBA draft by the Sacramento Kings and signed a three-year rookie contract on July 3, 2025. On November 4, he was assigned to the Stockton Kings of the NBA G League.

On March 17, 2026, Raynaud recorded a career-high 32 points and nine rebounds in a 104–132 loss to the San Antonio Spurs.

His average of 7.5 rebounds per game in the 2025–26 NBA season led the Sacramento Kings. Raynaud was named to the 2026 All-Rookie Second Team, becoming the only second-round draft pick named to either of the 2026 All-Rookie Teams.

== National team career ==
Raynaud has been a member of the France national team, competing at several levels of their junior program. He was a starter on the French team that won gold at the 2023 FIBA U20 European Championship, leading the team in scoring (26) in their championship win over Israel.

== Career statistics ==
Legend
GP	Games played	GS	Games started	MPG	Minutes per game
FG%	Field goal percentage	3P%	3-point field goal percentage	FT%	Free throw percentage
RPG	Rebounds per game	APG	Assists per game	SPG	Steals per game
BPG	Blocks per game	PPG	Points per game	**Bold**	Career high

=== NBA ===
Year	Team	GP	GS	MPG	FG%	3P%	FT%	RPG	APG	SPG	BPG	PPG
2025–26	Sacramento	74	56	26.5	.571	.324	.786	7.5	1.4	.5	.5	12.5
Career		74	56	26.5	.571	.324	.786	7.5	1.4	.5	.5	12.5

=== College ===
Year	Team	GP	GS	MPG	FG%	3P%	FT%	RPG	APG	SPG	BPG	PPG
2021–22	Stanford	29	5	12.0	.541	**.423**	.538	3.8	.8	.2	.2	4.5
2022–23	Stanford	33	23	22.4	.540	.279	.595	6.1	.9	.5	.5	8.8
2023–24	Stanford	32	31	29.1	**.567**	.361	**.784**	9.6	**2.0**	.7	.8	15.5
2024–25	Stanford	**35**	**35**	**33.5**	.467	.347	.770	**10.6**	1.7	**.9**	**1.4**	**20.2**
Career		129	94	24.7	.515	.347	.732	7.7	1.3	.6	.8	12.6

== See also ==
- List of All-Atlantic Coast Conference men's basketball teams
