= 2025–26 Sacramento Kings season =

- Head coach: Doug Christie
- President: John Rinehart
- General manager: Scott Perry
- Owner: Vivek Ranadivé
- Arena: Golden 1 Center

Results
- Record: 22–60 (.268)
- Place: Division: 5th (Pacific); Conference: 14th (Western)
- Playoff finish: Did not qualify
- Stats at Basketball Reference

Local media
- Television: NBC Sports California; CBS 13
- Radio: KHTK Sports 1140

The 2025–26 Sacramento Kings season was the 81st season for the franchise in the National Basketball Association (NBA), and 41st season in the city of Sacramento. On May 1, 2025, the Kings hired Doug Christie as their head coach.

Following a loss to the Cleveland Cavaliers on February 7, the Kings failed to improve upon their 40–42 record from the previous season, while also becoming the first team in the NBA to have a guaranteed losing record for the year. During this time, the Kings suffered a 16-game losing streak from January to February 2026, the longest in franchise history. Domantas Sabonis, Zach LaVine, and DeAndre Hunter were already sidelined for the rest of the season due to injuries. With a loss to the Charlotte Hornets on March 11, the Kings were eliminated from playoff contention for the third consecutive season.

The Kings finished the season with a 22–60 record—the franchise's first 60-loss season since 2008–09. The team had the same regular season record as the Utah Jazz, but won the tiebreaker due to a better intra-conference record; as a result, the Kings placed 14th in the West.

== Draft picks ==
Round	Pick	Player	Position	Nationality	College
2	42	Maxime Raynaud	C	France	Stanford

The Kings entered the draft with only one second-round selection, which originally belonged to the Chicago Bulls and was acquired from the San Antonio Spurs in February 2025 in a three-team deal that sent De'Aaron Fox to San Antonio. The team's first-round pick conveyed to the Atlanta Hawks after falling outside its top-12 protection following the NBA draft lottery, while a second-round pick was traded to the Chicago Bulls as part of the 2024 DeMar DeRozan three-team deal.

During the first round, Sacramento traded a 2027 second-round pick (originally acquired from San Antonio) to the Oklahoma City Thunder in exchange for the draft rights to Nique Clifford, the 24th pick.

== Roster ==
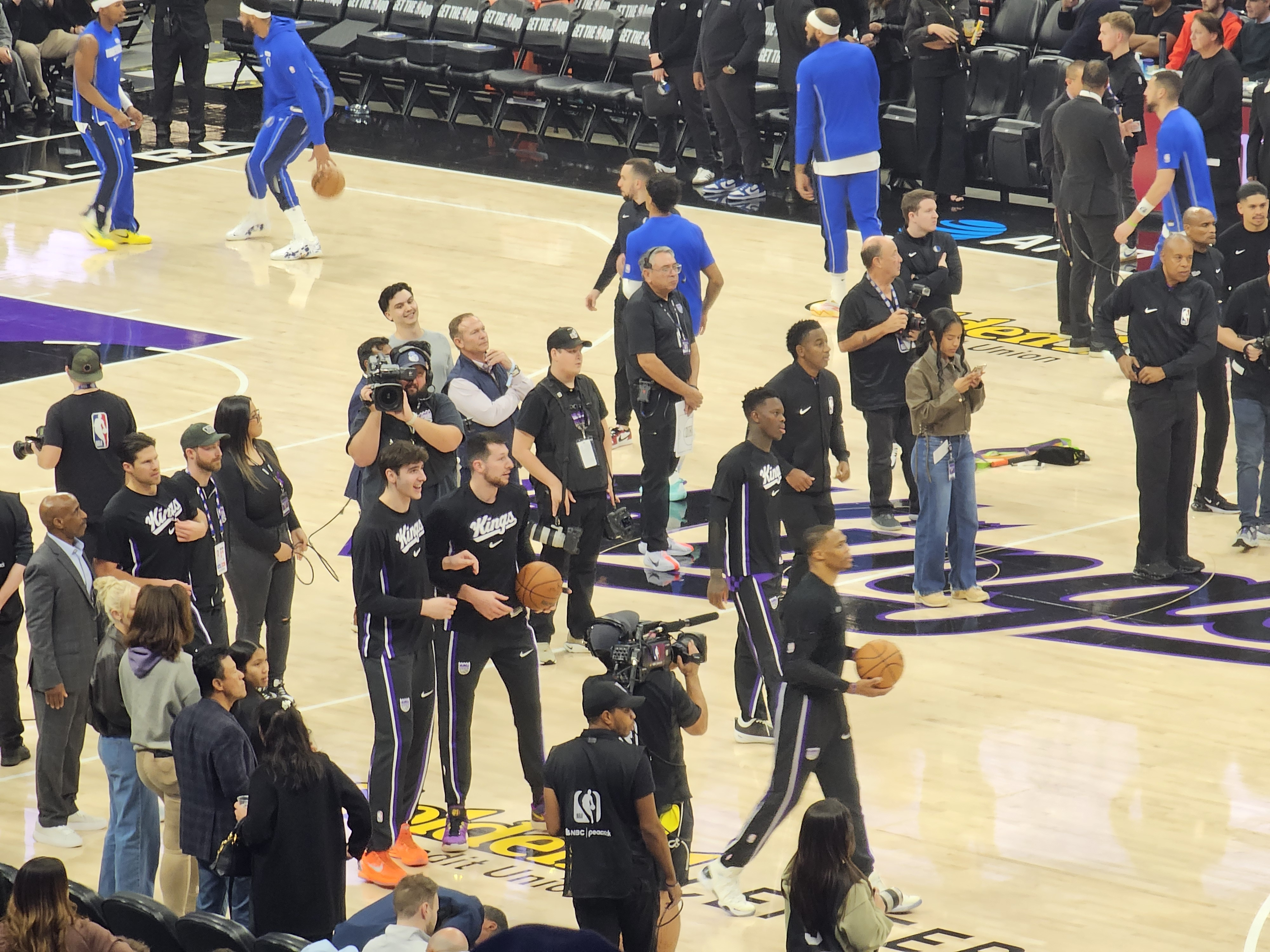
The Kings warming up ahead of their home game against the Dallas Mavericks on January 6, 2026

2025–26 Sacramento Kings roster
Players

Pos.	No.	Player	Height	Weight	DOB	From
F	9	Precious Achiuwa	6 ft 8 in (2.03 m)	243 lb (110 kg)	1999-09-19	Nigeria
F	23	Patrick Baldwin Jr. (TW)	6 ft 10 in (2.08 m)	220 lb (100 kg)	2002-11-18	Auburn
C	32	Dylan Cardwell	6 ft 11 in (2.11 m)	255 lb (116 kg)	2001-12-16	Auburn
G	22	Devin Carter	6 ft 2 in (1.88 m)	195 lb (88 kg)	2002-03-18	Providence
G	5	Nique Clifford	6 ft 5 in (1.96 m)	175 lb (79 kg)	2002-02-09	Colorado State
G/F	10	DeMar DeRozan	6 ft 6 in (1.98 m)	220 lb (100 kg)	1989-08-07	USC
F/C	19	Drew Eubanks	6 ft 10 in (2.08 m)	245 lb (111 kg)	1997-02-01	Oregon State
G	3	Killian Hayes	6 ft 5 in (1.96 m)	195 lb (88 kg)	2001-07-27	France
G/F	15	De'Andre Hunter	6 ft 7 in (2.01 m)	221 lb (100 kg)	1997-12-02	Virginia
G	8	Zach LaVine (injured)	6 ft 5 in (1.96 m)	200 lb (91 kg)	1995-03-10	UCLA
F	7	Doug McDermott	6 ft 6 in (1.98 m)	225 lb (102 kg)	1992-01-03	Creighton
G	0	Malik Monk	6 ft 3 in (1.91 m)	200 lb (91 kg)	1998-02-04	Kentucky
F	13	Keegan Murray (injured)	6 ft 8 in (2.03 m)	225 lb (102 kg)	2000-08-19	Iowa
G/F	29	Daeqwon Plowden (TW)	6 ft 6 in (1.98 m)	215 lb (98 kg)	1998-08-29	Bowling Green
C	42	Maxime Raynaud	7 ft 1 in (2.16 m)	250 lb (113 kg)	2003-04-07	Stanford
F/C	11	Domantas Sabonis (injured)	6 ft 10 in (2.08 m)	240 lb (109 kg)	1996-05-03	Gonzaga
G	24	Isaiah Stevens (TW)	6 ft 0 in (1.83 m)	185 lb (84 kg)	2000-11-01	Colorado State
G	18	Russell Westbrook	6 ft 4 in (1.93 m)	200 lb (91 kg)	1988-11-12	UCLA

Coaches
Head coach
- Doug Christie
Assistant(s)
- Mike Woodson (Associate HC)
- Leandro Barbosa
- Bobby Jackson
- Mike Miller
- Chris Darnell

Legend
- (DP) Unsigned draft pick
- (FA) Free agent
- (S) Suspended
- (GL) On assignment to G League affiliate
- (TW) Two-way affiliate player
- Injured

Roster
Updated: March 1, 2026

== Standings ==
=== Division ===
Pacific Division	W	L	PCT	GB	Home	Road	Div	GP
y – Los Angeles Lakers	53	29	.646	–	28‍–‍13	25‍–‍16	9‍–‍7	82
x – Phoenix Suns	45	37	.549	8.0	25‍–‍16	20‍–‍21	10‍–‍6	82
pi – Los Angeles Clippers	42	40	.512	11.0	23‍–‍18	19‍–‍22	10‍–‍6	82
pi – Golden State Warriors	37	45	.451	16.0	22‍–‍19	15‍–‍26	7‍–‍9	82
Sacramento Kings	22	60	.268	31.0	15‍–‍26	7‍–‍34	4‍–‍12	82

=== Conference ===
Western Conference
#	Team	W	L	PCT	GB	GP
1	z – Oklahoma City Thunder *	64	18	.780	–	82
2	y – San Antonio Spurs *	62	20	.756	2.0	82
3	x – Denver Nuggets	54	28	.659	10.0	82
4	y – Los Angeles Lakers *	53	29	.646	11.0	82
5	x – Houston Rockets	52	30	.634	12.0	82
6	x – Minnesota Timberwolves	49	33	.598	15.0	82
7	x – Phoenix Suns	45	37	.549	19.0	82
8	x – Portland Trail Blazers	42	40	.512	22.0	82
9	pi – Los Angeles Clippers	42	40	.512	22.0	82
10	pi – Golden State Warriors	37	45	.451	27.0	82
11	New Orleans Pelicans	26	56	.317	38.0	82
12	Dallas Mavericks	26	56	.317	38.0	82
13	Memphis Grizzlies	25	57	.305	39.0	82
14	Sacramento Kings	22	60	.268	42.0	82
15	Utah Jazz	22	60	.268	42.0	82

== Game log ==
=== Preseason ===
2025 preseason game log
Total: 1–3 (Home: 0–2; Road: 1–1)
Preseason: 1–3 (home: 0–2; road: 1–1)

Game	Date	Team	Score	High points	High rebounds	High assists	Location Attendance	Record
1	October 8	Toronto	L 122–130	Domantas Sabonis (19)	DeRozan, Raynaud, Schröder (6)	Nique Clifford (9)	Golden 1 Center; 16,362	0–1
2	October 10	@ Portland	L 123–124	Zach LaVine (19)	Murray, Raynaud (5)	Maxime Raynaud (4)	Moda Center; 15,323	0–2
3	October 15	L.A. Clippers	L 91–109	Nique Clifford (19)	Domantas Sabonis (14)	Zach LaVine (6)	Golden 1 Center; 16,016	0–3
4	October 17	@ L.A. Lakers	W 117–116	Dennis Schröder (25)	Dylan Cardwell (7)	Nique Clifford (7)	Crypto.com Arena; 16,053	1–3

2025–26 preseason schedule

=== Regular season ===
2025–26 game log
Total: 22–60 (Home: 15–26; Road: 7–34)
October: 1–4 (home: 1–1; road: 0–3)

Game	Date	Team	Score	High points	High rebounds	High assists	Location Attendance	Record
1	October 22	@ Phoenix	L 116–120	Zach LaVine (30)	Nique Clifford (8)	DeMar DeRozan (9)	Mortgage Matchup Center; 17,071	0–1
2	October 24	Utah	W 105–104	Zach LaVine (31)	Domantas Sabonis (12)	DeMar Derozan (6)	Golden 1 Center; 17,832	1–1
3	October 26	L.A. Lakers	L 120–127	Zach LaVine (32)	Domantas Sabonis (14)	Dennis Schröder (12)	Golden 1 Center; 17,832	1–2
4	October 28	@ Oklahoma City	L 101–107	Zach LaVine (23)	Domantas Sabonis (18)	Monk, Westbrook (4)	Paycom Center; 18,203	1–3
5	October 29	@ Chicago	L 113–126	Zach LaVine (30)	Domantas Sabonis (11)	Dennis Schröder (7)	United Center; 19,017	1–4

November: 4–12 (home: 2–6; road: 2–6)

Game	Date	Team	Score	High points	High rebounds	High assists	Location Attendance	Record
6	November 1	@ Milwaukee	W 135–133	Zach LaVine (31)	Domantas Sabonis (13)	Russell Westbrook (10)	Fiserv Forum; 17,341	2–4
7	November 3	@ Denver	L 124–130	Russell Westbrook (26)	Domantas Sabonis (17)	Dennis Schröder (9)	Ball Arena; 19,653	2–5
8	November 5	Golden State	W 121–116	DeMar DeRozan (25)	Russell Westbrook (16)	Russell Westbrook (10)	Golden 1 Center; 17,832	3–5
9	November 7	Oklahoma City	L 101–132	Russell Westbrook (24)	Maxime Raynaud (10)	Russell Westbrook (9)	Golden 1 Center; 15,767	3–6
10	November 9	Minnesota	L 117–144	Zach LaVine (26)	Domantas Sabonis (13)	Clifford, Monk (5)	Golden 1 Center; 15,227	3–7
11	November 11	Denver	L 108–122	Sabonis, Eubanks (19)	Sabonis, Westbrook (8)	Russell Westbrook (11)	Golden 1 Center; 15,106	3–8
12	November 12	Atlanta	L 100–133	Keon Ellis (20)	Devin Carter (6)	Clifford, Schröder (4)	Golden 1 Center; 15,008	3–9
13	November 14	@ Minnesota	L 110–124	Domantas Sabonis (34)	Domantas Sabonis (11)	Russell Westbrook (14)	Target Center; 16,962	3–10
14	November 16	@ San Antonio	L 110–123	DeMar DeRozan (27)	Domantas Sabonis (13)	Russell Westbrook (7)	Frost Bank Center; 18,354	3–11
15	November 19	@ Oklahoma City	L 99–113	Dennis Schröder (21)	Russell Westbrook (10)	Russell Westbrook (6)	Paycom Center; 18,203	3–12
16	November 20	@ Memphis	L 96–137	Zach LaVine (26)	Russell Westbrook (7)	Dennis Schröder (6)	FedExForum; 14,704	3–13
17	November 22	@ Denver	W 128–123	Westbrook, Schrõder (21)	DeMar DeRozan (7)	Russell Westbrook (11)	Ball Arena; 19,893	4–13
18	November 24	Minnesota	W 117–112	DeMar DeRozan (33)	Keegan Murray (14)	Russell Westbrook (7)	Golden 1 Center; 16,957	5–13
19	November 26	Phoenix	L 100–112	Murray, Westbrook (19)	Drew Eubanks (9)	Achiuwa, DeRozan, Murray, Westbrook (3)	Golden 1 Center; 17,961	5–14
20	November 28	@ Utah	L 119–128	Zach LaVine (34)	Russell Westbrook (12)	Russell Westbrook (14)	Delta Center; 18,186	5–15
21	November 30	Memphis	L 107–115	DeMar DeRozan (23)	Precious Achiuwa (7)	Russell Westbrook (7)	Golden 1 Center; 15,901	5–16

December: 3–9 (home: 2–3; road: 1–6)

Game	Date	Team	Score	High points	High rebounds	High assists	Location Attendance	Record
22	December 3	@ Houston	L 95–121	Monk, Raynaud (25)	Keegan Murray (11)	Russell Westbrook (9)	Toyota Center; 18,055	5–17
23	December 6	@ Miami	W 127–111	Zach LaVine (42)	Achiuwa, Raynaud (10)	Russell Westbrook (10)	Kaseya Center; 19,700	6–17
24	December 8	@ Indiana	L 105–116	Russell Westbrook (24)	Russell Westbrook (13)	Russell Westbrook (14)	Gainbridge Fieldhouse; 16,465	6–18
25	December 11	Denver	L 105–136	Malik Monk (18)	Maxime Raynaud (9)	Monk, Westbrook (5)	Golden 1 Center; 16,307	6–19
26	December 14	@ Minnesota	L 103–117	Tied (17)	Keegan Murray (8)	Russell Westbrook (10)	Target Center; 15,466	6–20
27	December 18	@ Portland	L 133–134 (OT)	DeMar DeRozan (33)	Maxime Raynaud (11)	Russell Westbrook (10)	Moda Center; 16,382	6–21
28	December 20	Portland	L 93–98	Dennis Schröder (21)	Maxime Raynaud (11)	Russell Westbrook (7)	Golden 1 Center; 15,963	6–22
29	December 21	Houston	W 125–124 (OT)	DeMar DeRozan (27)	Maxime Raynaud (14)	Dennis Schröder (10)	Golden 1 Center; 15,796	7–22
30	December 23	Detroit	L 127–136	DeMar DeRozan (37)	Precious Achiuwa (12)	DeMar DeRozan (8)	Golden 1 Center; 17,832	7–23
31	December 27	Dallas	W 113–107	Ellis, Westbrook (21)	Achiuwa, Clifford (9)	Russell Westbrook (9)	Golden 1 Center; 17,832	8–23
32	December 28	@ L.A. Lakers	L 101–125	DeMar DeRozan (22)	Maxime Raynaud (10)	Dennis Schröder (7)	Crypto.com Arena; 18,997	8–24
33	December 30	@ L.A. Clippers	L 90–131	Nique Clifford (18)	Maxime Raynaud (12)	Schröder, Westbrook (4)	Intuit Dome; 17,927	8–25

January: 4–13 (home: 4–6; road: 0–7)

Game	Date	Team	Score	High points	High rebounds	High assists	Location Attendance	Record
34	January 1	Boston	L 106–120	DeMar DeRozan (25)	Maxime Raynaud (8)	Dennis Schröder (7)	Golden 1 Center; 17,832	8–26
35	January 2	@ Phoenix	L 102–129	Keegan Murray (23)	Murray, Westbrook (9)	Russell Westbrook (6)	Mortgage Matchup Center; 17,071	8–27
36	January 4	Milwaukee	L 98–115	Russell Westbrook (21)	Maxime Raynaud (8)	Dennis Schröder (5)	Golden 1 Center; 15,892	8–28
37	January 6	Dallas	L 98–100	DeMar DeRozan (21)	Tied (9)	Dennis Schröder (9)	Golden 1 Center; 15,058	8–29
38	January 9	@ Golden State	L 103–137	DeMar DeRozan (24)	Dylan Cardwell (8)	Russell Westbrook (7)	Chase Center; 18,064	8–30
39	January 11	Houston	W 111–98	DeMar DeRozan (22)	Dylan Cardwell (11)	Russell Westbrook (10)	Golden 1 Center; 15,268	9–30
40	January 12	L.A. Lakers	W 124–112	DeMar DeRozan (32)	Achiuwa, Cardwell (7)	Malik Monk (8)	Golden 1 Center; 17,832	10–30
41	January 14	New York	W 112–101	DeMar DeRozan (27)	Precious Achiuwa (14)	Russell Westbrook (11)	Golden 1 Center; 15,095	11–30
42	January 16	Washington	W 128–115	Russell Westbrook (26)	Dylan Cardwell (9)	Russell Westbrook (6)	Golden 1 Center; 16,339	12–30
43	January 18	Portland	L 110–117	Monk, Westbrook (23)	Dylan Cardwell (10)	DeRozan, Westbrook (7)	Golden 1 Center; 16,241	12–31
44	January 20	Miami	L 117–130	DeMar DeRozan (23)	Dylan Cardwell (12)	Russell Westbrook (7)	Golden 1 Center; 15,295	12–32
45	January 21	Toronto	L 109–122	Russell Westbrook (23)	Dylan Cardwell (13)	Zach LaVine (5)	Golden 1 Center; 16,182	12–33
46	January 23	@ Cleveland	L 118–123	Domantas Sabonis (24)	Domantas Sabonis (16)	Malik Monk (7)	Rocket Arena; 19,432	12–34
47	January 25	@ Detroit	L 116–139	Malik Monk (19)	Dylan Cardwell (9)	Domantas Sabonis (8)	Little Caesars Arena; 18,299	12–35
48	January 27	@ New York	L 87–103	DeMar DeRozan (34)	Domantas Sabonis (12)	Domantas Sabonis (7)	Madison Square Garden; 19,812	12–36
49	January 29	@ Philadelphia	L 111–113	Dennis Schröder (27)	Precious Achiuwa (13)	DeMar DeRozan (8)	Xfinity Mobile Arena; 18,608	12–37
50	January 30	@ Boston	L 93–112	Zach LaVine (17)	Maxime Raynaud (14)	Malik Monk (4)	TD Garden; 19,156	12–38

February: 2–9 (home: 0–4; road: 2–5)

Game	Date	Team	Score	High points	High rebounds	High assists	Location Attendance	Record
51	February 1	@ Washington	L 112–116	Zach LaVine (35)	LaVine, Raynaud (6)	DeRozan, Stevens (5)	Capital One Arena; 13,102	12–39
52	February 4	Memphis	L 125–129	Domantas Sabonis (24)	Domantas Sabonis (15)	Tied (5)	Golden 1 Center; 15,017	12–40
53	February 6	L.A. Clippers	L 111–114	Malik Monk (18)	Dylan Cardwell (14)	Russell Westbrook (5)	Golden 1 Center; 16,665	12–41
54	February 7	Cleveland	L 126–132	Nique Clifford (30)	Dylan Cardwell (11)	Russell Westbrook (9)	Golden 1 Center; 16,212	12–42
55	February 9	@ New Orleans	L 94–120	Maxime Raynaud (21)	Maxime Raynaud (19)	Nique Clifford (6)	Smoothie King Center; 16,633	12–43
56	February 11	@ Utah	L 93–121	DeMar DeRozan (20)	Dylan Cardwell (10)	Nique Clifford (6)	Delta Center; 18,186	12–44
All-Star Game
57	February 19	Orlando	L 94–131	Maxime Raynaud (17)	Maxime Raynaud (14)	DeMar DeRozan (6)	Golden 1 Center; 16,544	12–45
58	February 21	@ San Antonio	L 122–139	DeRozan, Murray (20)	Maxime Raynaud (12)	Malik Monk (6)	Moody Center; 16,168	12–46
59	February 23	@ Memphis	W 123–114	Russell Westbrook (25)	Maxime Raynaud (13)	Russell Westbrook (7)	FedExForum; 14,176	13–46
60	February 25	@ Houston	L 97–128	Russell Westbrook (22)	Precious Achiuwa (10)	DeMar DeRozan (7)	Toyota Center; 18,055	13–47
61	February 26	@ Dallas	W 130–121	Precious Achiuwa (29)	Precious Achiuwa (12)	Nique Clifford (7)	American Airlines Center; 19,013	14–47

March: 5–10 (home: 4–5; road: 1–5)

Game	Date	Team	Score	High points	High rebounds	High assists	Location Attendance	Record
62	March 1	@ L.A. Lakers	L 104–128	Nique Clifford (26)	Maxime Raynaud (13)	DeMar DeRozan (8)	Crypto.com Arena; 18,272	14–48
63	March 3	Phoenix	L 103–114	Maxime Raynaud (22)	Maxime Raynaud (10)	Russell Westbrook (7)	Golden 1 Center; 15,009	14–49
64	March 5	New Orleans	L 123–133	Precious Achiuwa (29)	Precious Achiuwa (12)	Russell Westbrook (10)	Golden 1 Center; 15,350	14–50
65	March 8	Chicago	W 126–110	Malik Monk (30)	Raynaud, Westbrook (11)	Russell Westbrook (12)	Golden 1 Center; 15,022	15–50
66	March 10	Indiana	W 114–109	Devin Carter (24)	Maxime Raynaud (11)	Russell Westbrook (9)	Golden 1 Center; 14,618	16–50
67	March 11	Charlotte	L 109–117	DeMar DeRozan (39)	Precious Achiuwa (8)	Nique Clifford (8)	Golden 1 Center; 15,597	16–51
68	March 14	@ L.A. Clippers	W 118–109	DeMar DeRozan (27)	Precious Achiuwa (13)	Russell Westbrook (10)	Intuit Dome; 17,420	17–51
69	March 15	Utah	W 116–111	DeMar DeRozan (41)	Maxime Raynaud (12)	DeMar DeRozan (11)	Golden 1 Center; 15,132	18–51
70	March 17	San Antonio	L 104–132	Maxime Raynaud (32)	Maxime Raynaud (9)	Russell Westbrook (10)	Golden 1 Center; 16,475	18–52
71	March 19	Philadelphia	L 118–139	Maxime Raynaud (30)	Dylan Cardwell (13)	Russell Westbrook (8)	Golden 1 Center; 15,007	18–53
72	March 22	Brooklyn	W 126–122	Malik Monk (32)	Precious Achiuwa (15)	DeMar DeRozan (8)	Golden 1 Center; 16,289	19–53
73	March 24	@ Charlotte	L 90–134	Daeqwon Plowden (22)	Dylan Cardwell (11)	Malik Monk (14)	Spectrum Center; 19,450	19–54
74	March 26	@ Orlando	L 117–121	DeMar DeRozan (33)	Precious Achiuwa (9)	DeMar DeRozan (11)	Kia Center; 17,256	19–55
75	March 28	@ Atlanta	L 113–123	DeMar DeRozan (22)	Maxime Raynaud (10)	Malik Monk (7)	State Farm Arena; 17,066	19–56
76	March 29	@ Brooklyn	L 99–116	Devin Carter (20)	Tied (8)	Killian Hayes (7)	Barclays Center; 17,548	19–57

April: 3–3 (home: 2–1; road: 1–2)

Game	Date	Team	Score	High points	High rebounds	High assists	Location Attendance	Record
77	April 1	@ Toronto	W 123–115	Achiuwa, DeRozan (28)	Precious Achiuwa (19)	Malik Monk (5)	Scotiabank Arena; 18,616	20–57
78	April 3	New Orleans	W 117–113	Maxime Raynaud (28)	Maxime Raynaud (9)	Nique Clifford (6)	Golden 1 Center; 15,422	21–57
79	April 5	L.A. Clippers	L 109–138	Devin Carter (21)	Maxime Raynaud (15)	Carter, Clifford (5)	Golden 1 Center; 15,014	21–58
80	April 7	@ Golden State	L 105–110	Killian Hayes (18)	Dylan Cardwell (9)	Devin Carter (5)	Chase Center; 18,064	21–59
81	April 10	Golden State	W 124–118	Devin Carter (29)	Tied (9)	Nique Clifford (6)	Golden 1 Center; 18,175	22–59
82	April 12	@ Portland	L 110–122	Precious Achiuwa (27)	Precious Achiuwa (11)	Devin Carter (8)	Moda Center; 19,555	22–60

2025–26 season schedule

=== NBA Cup ===
==== West Group A ====
Pos	Team	Pld	W	L	PF	PA	PD	Qualification
1	Oklahoma City Thunder	4	4	0	512	437	+75	Advanced to knockout rounds
2	Phoenix Suns	4	3	1	463	432	+31	Advanced to knockout rounds
3	Minnesota Timberwolves	4	2	2	479	434	+45	
4	Utah Jazz	4	1	3	433	518	−85	
5	Sacramento Kings	4	0	4	430	496	−66	

Source: NBA

== Player statistics ==
Legend
GP	Games played	GS	Games started	MPG	Minutes per game
FG%	Field-goal percentage	3P%	3-point field-goal percentage	FT%	Free-throw percentage
RPG	Rebounds per game	APG	Assists per game	SPG	Steals per game
BPG	Blocks per game	PPG	Points per game

=== Regular season ===
Sacramento Kings statistics
Player	GP	GS	MPG	FG%	3P%	FT%	RPG	APG	SPG	BPG	PPG
Precious Achiuwa	73	57	23.9	.528	.278	.554	6.7	1.4	.9	.7	10.1
Patrick Baldwin Jr.^{†}	6	1	14.7	.348	.364	.600	3.5	.8	.5	.8	3.8
Dylan Cardwell	44	1	20.6	.587	.500	.510	7.5	1.4	.7	1.5	5.4
Devin Carter	38	12	18.4	.414	.263	.713	3.3	2.7	.9	.2	8.9
Nique Clifford	75	28	25.1	.418	.333	.722	3.8	2.4	.9	.3	8.6
DeMar DeRozan	77	77	31.2	.497	.320	.868	2.9	4.1	1.0	.3	18.4
Keon Ellis^{†}	43	5	17.6	.397	.368	.625	1.3	.6	1.1	.5	5.6
Drew Eubanks	42	11	13.1	.596	.143	.561	3.0	.5	.4	.6	5.2
Killian Hayes	23	3	17.7	.304	.270	.929	2.3	3.5	.9	.2	5.5
De'Andre Hunter^{†}	2	2	25.5	.211	.222	.833	1.5	.5	.0	.0	7.5
DaQuan Jeffries	3	0	20.0	.579	.444	1.000	1.7	.3	.7	.0	10.3
Isaac Jones^{†}	3	1	5.7	.500	.000	.500	.7	.3	.0	.0	1.0
Zach LaVine	39	37	31.4	.479	.390	.880	2.8	2.3	.7	.3	19.2
Doug McDermott	29	0	15.1	.388	.390	.889	1.3	.8	.2	.1	5.7
Malik Monk	62	3	22.0	.438	.395	.879	1.9	3.0	.6	.4	12.5
Keegan Murray	23	22	34.5	.420	.277	.776	5.7	1.7	1.0	1.6	14.0
Daeqwon Plowden	32	7	26.4	.430	.333	.857	3.0	1.3	.7	.2	10.8
Maxime Raynaud	74	56	26.5	.571	.324	.786	7.5	1.4	.5	.5	12.5
Domantas Sabonis	19	15	29.7	.543	.185	.727	11.4	4.1	.9	.2	15.8
Dario Šarić	5	0	8.2	.167	.333	1.000	1.2	.4	.0	.0	1.0
Dennis Schröder^{†}	40	14	26.4	.408	.343	.820	3.1	5.3	.8	.2	12.8
Isaiah Stevens	3	0	14.3	.429	.000	1.000	1.0	3.3	1.7	.0	3.3
Russell Westbrook	64	58	29.0	.427	.338	.694	5.4	6.7	1.3	.2	15.2

- ^{†} Denotes player spent time with another team in the season. Stats reflect time with the Kings only.

== Transactions ==
=== Trades ===
Date	Trade		Ref.
June 25, 2025	To Sacramento Kings: Draft rights to Nique Clifford (No. 24)	To Oklahoma City Thunder: 2027 protected first-round pick (from San Antonio) (Note: Oklahoma City will receive the pick if it's No. 17–30, otherwise they receive two 2027 second-round picks.)	
July 7, 2025	To Sacramento Kings: Dennis Schröder (sign-and-trade); 2029 second-round pick (Note: The least favorable of the picks originally belonging to Detroit, Milwaukee, and New York.)	To Detroit Pistons: 2026 protected second-round pick (from Charlotte) (Note: Detroit will receive the pick if it's No. 56–60.)	
July 13, 2025	To Sacramento Kings: Dario Šarić	To Denver Nuggets: Jonas Valančiūnas	
February 1, 2026	Three-team deal		
February 1, 2026	To Chicago Bulls: Dario Šarić; 2027 second-round pick (from Denver); 2029 second-round pick (from Sacramento)	To Cleveland Cavaliers: Keon Ellis; Dennis Schröder; Emanuel Miller	
February 1, 2026	To Sacramento Kings: De’Andre Hunter		

=== Free agency ===
==== Subtractions ====
Player	Reason	New Team	Ref.
Jake LaRavia	Free agency	Los Angeles Lakers	
