= Keon Ellis =

American basketball player (born 2000)

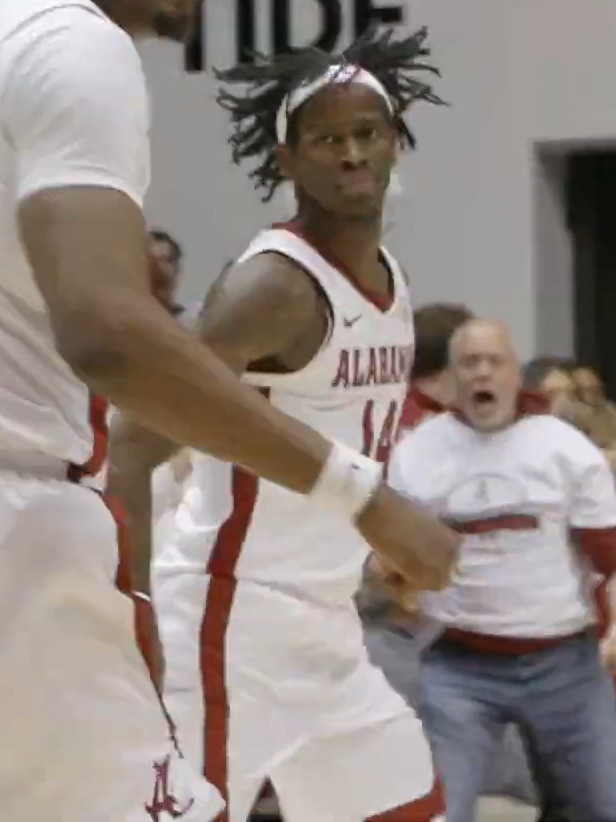
- Ellis with Alabama in 2022

No. 1 – Brooklyn Nets
- Position: Shooting guard
- League: NBA

Personal information
- Born: January 8, 2000 (age 26) Eustis, Florida, U.S.
- Listed height: 6 ft 4 in (1.93 m)
- Listed weight: 180 lb (82 kg)

Career information
- High school: Eustis (Eustis, Florida); Leesburg (Leesburg, Florida)
- College: Florida SouthWestern (2018–2020); Alabama (2020–2022)
- NBA draft: 2022: undrafted
- Playing career: 2022–present

Career history
- 2022–2026: Sacramento Kings
- 2022–2024: →Stockton Kings
- 2026: Cleveland Cavaliers
- 2026–present: Brooklyn Nets

Career highlights
- SEC All-Defensive Team (2022); Second-team NJCAA DI All-American (2020); Suncoast Player of the Year (2020); First-team All-Suncoast (2020); Second-team All-Suncoast (2019)
- Stats at NBA.com
- Stats at Basketball Reference

Keon Tyrese Ellis (born January 8, 2000) is an American professional basketball player for the Brooklyn Nets of the National Basketball Association (NBA). He played college basketball for the Florida SouthWestern Buccaneers and the Alabama Crimson Tide.

== High school career ==
Ellis played basketball for Eustis High School in his hometown of Eustis, Florida before transferring to Leesburg High School in Leesburg, Florida for his junior season. He led Leesburg to back-to-back Class 6A state titles. As a senior, Ellis averaged 12.7 points, 11 rebounds and two assists per game, helping his team achieve a 29–1 record. He signed to play college basketball for Gardner–Webb but instead opted to join Florida SouthWestern, a junior college program, for academic reasons.

== College career ==
As a freshman at Florida SouthWestern, Ellis averaged 8.3 points and three rebounds per game, earning Second Team All-Suncoast Conference honors. On January 4, 2020, he scored a school-record 41 points in a 92–77 win against St. Petersburg College. In his sophomore season, Ellis averaged 18.1 points, 4.3 rebounds, 2.2 assists and 2.1 steals per game, setting program single-season records in points and steals. He was recognized as a Second-Team NJCAA Division I All-American and Suncoast Player of the Year. For his junior season, Ellis moved to Alabama, choosing the Crimson Tide over Iowa State, Kansas State and Western Kentucky.

He averaged 5.5 points and four rebounds per game as a junior. Ellis was named to the SEC All-Defensive Team as a senior. He averaged 12.1 points, 6.1 rebounds and two steals per game.

== Professional career ==
=== Sacramento / Stockton Kings (2022–2026) ===
After going undrafted in the 2022 NBA draft, Ellis signed a two-way contract with the Sacramento Kings on July 2, 2022. Ellis played in seven total games during the 2022 NBA Summer League, averaging 11.4 points on 44.1% shooting from the field and an impressive 46.9% from three, 3.6 rebounds, 3.3 assists and 2.0 steals per game. He made 16 appearances for Sacramento during his rookie campaign, averaging 1.5 points, 0.5 rebounds, and 0.4 assists.

On July 2, 2023, Ellis signed another two-way contract with Sacramento and on February 9, 2024, he signed a multi-year contract with the Kings. On April 9, Ellis scored a career–high 26 points in a loss against the Oklahoma City Thunder. He made 57 appearances (including 21 starts) for the Kings during the 2023–24 NBA season, averaging 5.4 points, 2.2 rebounds, and 1.5 assists. On April 17, Ellis helped the Kings to a play-in tournament victory over the Golden State Warriors, with 15 points, five assists, four rebounds, three steals and three blocks.

On November 18, 2024, Ellis scored a new career-high 33 points with nine three-pointers in a loss against the Atlanta Hawks. He made 80 appearances (including 28 starts) for Sacramento in the 2024–25 season, recording averages of 8.3 points, 2.7 rebounds, and 1.5 assists. Ellis played in 43 games (including five starts) for the Kings during the 2025–26 season, averaging 5.6 points, 1.3 rebounds, and 0.6 assists. During Ellis' tenure with the Kings, the team's fans praised him for his perimeter defense and shooting.

=== Cleveland Cavaliers (2026) ===
On February 1, 2026, Ellis was traded to the Cleveland Cavaliers in a three-team trade that included the Chicago Bulls. Ellis averaged 8.3 points, 1.6 assists, 1.3 steals, and 0.8 blocks in 29 regular season games for the Cavaliers. During the postseason, Ellis averaged 1.6 points, 0.3 assists, and 0.1 blocks, while playing a reduced role.

=== Brooklyn Nets (2026–present) ===
On July 6, 2026, Ellis signed a two-year, $18 million contract with the Brooklyn Nets. On October 21, he made his Nets debut, recording seven points, four assists and two steals in a 110–103 loss to the Charlotte Hornets.

== Career statistics ==
Legend
GP	Games played	GS	Games started	MPG	Minutes per game
FG%	Field goal percentage	3P%	3-point field goal percentage	FT%	Free throw percentage
RPG	Rebounds per game	APG	Assists per game	SPG	Steals per game
BPG	Blocks per game	PPG	Points per game	**Bold**	Career high

=== NBA ===
==== Regular season ====
Year	Team	GP	GS	MPG	FG%	3P%	FT%	RPG	APG	SPG	BPG	PPG
2022–23	Sacramento	16	0	4.4	.438	**.500**	.571	.5	.4	.3	.1	1.5
2023–24	Sacramento	57	21	17.2	.461	.417	.743	2.2	1.5	.9	.5	5.4
2024–25	Sacramento	**80**	**28**	24.4	.489	.433	**.849**	2.7	1.5	**1.5**	**.8**	**8.3**
2025–26	Sacramento	43	5	17.6	.397	.368	.625	1.3	.6	1.1	.5	5.6
2025–26	Cleveland	29	6	**24.8**	**.491**	.355	.816	**2.8**	**1.6**	1.3	**.8**	**8.3**
Career		225	60	19.9	.465	.407	.778	2.1	1.3	1.2	.6	6.6

==== Playoffs ====
Year	Team	GP	GS	MPG	FG%	3P%	FT%	RPG	APG	SPG	BPG	PPG
2026	Cleveland	12	0	7.4	.333	.357	.800	1.2	.3	.6	.1	1.6
Career		12	0	7.4	.333	.357	.800	1.2	.3	.6	.1	1.6

=== College ===
==== NCAA Division I ====
Year	Team	GP	GS	MPG	FG%	3P%	FT%	RPG	APG	SPG	BPG	PPG
2020–21	Alabama	32	7	17.5	.504	.389	.723	4.0	1.1	1.1	.4	5.5

==== JUCO ====
Year	Team	GP	GS	MPG	FG%	3P%	FT%	RPG	APG	SPG	BPG	PPG
2018–19	Florida SouthWestern	**33**	6	18.3	.442	.291	.767	3.0	**2.2**	1.5	.6	8.3
2019–20	Florida SouthWestern	31	**26**	**27.6**	**.536**	**.401**	**.807**	**4.3**	**2.2**	**2.1**	**1.2**	**18.1**
Career		64	32	22.8	.501	.371	.791	3.7	2.2	1.8	.9	13.1

== Personal life ==
Ellis' older brother, Antwon Clayton, played college basketball for Jacksonville before turning professional.
