= 2025–26 NBA season =

80th NBA season

- League: National Basketball Association
- Sport: Basketball
- Duration: October 21, 2025 – April 12, 2026; October 31 – December 16, 2025 (NBA Cup); April 14–17, 2026 (Play-in tournament); April 18 – May 30, 2026 (Playoffs); June 3–13, 2026 (Finals)
- Games: 82
- Teams: 30
- TV partner(s): ESPN/ABC, NBC/NBCSN, NBA TV
- Streaming partner(s): ESPN app/Disney+, Amazon Prime Video, Peacock

Draft
- Top draft pick: Cooper Flagg
- Picked by: Dallas Mavericks

Regular season
- Top seed: Oklahoma City Thunder
- Season MVP: Shai Gilgeous-Alexander (Oklahoma City)
- Top scorer: Luka Dončić (Los Angeles Lakers)

NBA Cup
- Champions: New York Knicks
- Runners-up: San Antonio Spurs

Playoffs
- Eastern champions: New York Knicks
- Eastern runners-up: Cleveland Cavaliers
- Western champions: San Antonio Spurs
- Western runners-up: Oklahoma City Thunder

Finals
- Champions: New York Knicks
- Runners-up: San Antonio Spurs
- Finals MVP: Jalen Brunson (New York)

NBA seasons
- ← 2024–25 2026–27 →

The 2025–26 NBA season was the 80th season of the National Basketball Association (NBA). The regular season began on October 21, 2025 and ended on April 12, 2026. The third edition of the in-season NBA Cup tournament was held from October 31 through December 16, 2025, with the New York Knicks winning it against the San Antonio Spurs. The 2026 NBA All-Star Game was played on February 15, 2026, at the Intuit Dome in Inglewood, California. The play-in tournament to attempt and win a playoff spot was played from April 14 to 17, 2026, followed the next day by the opening of the playoffs. In a rematch of the NBA Cup final, the Knicks defeated the Spurs in five games in the 2026 NBA Finals.

== Transactions ==
=== Retirements ===
- On June 29, 2025, Bojan Bogdanović announced his retirement from professional basketball, citing recurring foot injuries. He played for six teams in his ten-year NBA career.
- On August 18, 2025, Marco Belinelli announced his retirement from professional basketball. He spent 13 seasons in the NBA and won an NBA championship with the San Antonio Spurs in 2014.
- On August 19, 2025, John Wall announced his retirement from professional basketball. He played for three teams in his 13-year career.
- On August 30, 2025, Jeremy Lin announced his retirement from professional basketball. He played for eight teams in his nine-year NBA career. He is best known for the "Linsanity" phenomenon when he played with the New York Knicks in the 2011–12 season. He later won an NBA championship with the Toronto Raptors in 2019.
- On October 15, 2025, Malcolm Brogdon announced his retirement from professional basketball. He played for five teams in his nine-year career and was named the NBA Rookie of the Year in 2017.
- On November 22, 2025, Chris Paul announced that the 2025–26 season would be his last after playing for seven teams during his 21-year career. He was named NBA Rookie of the Year in 2006 and was the last remaining active player from the 2005 NBA draft. He announced his retirement from professional basketball on February 13, 2026.
- On December 2, 2025, Danilo Gallinari announced his retirement from professional basketball. He played for eight teams over a sixteen-year career.
- On May 7, 2026, P.J. Tucker announced his retirement from professional basketball. He played for eight teams over a fourteen-year career. Known for his defense, he won a championship with the Milwaukee Bucks in 2021.
- On May 12, 2026 Damion Lee announced his retirement from professional basketball. He played for three teams in his seven-year career, winning a championship with the Golden State Warriors in 2022.

=== Draft ===
The 2025 NBA draft took place on June 25–26 at Barclays Center in Brooklyn, New York.

=== Free agency ===
Free agency negotiations began on June 30, 2025, at 6:00 p.m. ET. Players may be signed after the July moratorium on July 6 at 12:00 p.m. ET.

=== Notable trades ===
- In the largest trade in NBA history, involving seven teams and 13 players, the Houston Rockets acquired Kevin Durant from the Phoenix Suns in exchange for Dillon Brooks and Jalen Green.
- The Atlanta Hawks traded Trae Young to the Washington Wizards for CJ McCollum and Corey Kispert.
- The Los Angeles Clippers traded James Harden to the Cleveland Cavaliers for Darius Garland and a second-round pick.

=== Coaching changes ===
Coaching changes
Team	2024–25 season	2025–26 season
Off-season
Denver Nuggets	David Adelman (interim)	David Adelman
Memphis Grizzlies	Tuomas Iisalo (interim)	Tuomas Iisalo
New York Knicks	Tom Thibodeau	Mike Brown
Phoenix Suns	Mike Budenholzer	Jordan Ott
Sacramento Kings	Doug Christie (interim)	Doug Christie
San Antonio Spurs	Gregg Popovich	Mitch Johnson
In-season
New Orleans Pelicans	Willie Green	James Borrego (interim)
Portland Trail Blazers	Chauncey Billups	Tiago Splitter (interim)

==== Off-season ====
- On April 14, 2025, the Phoenix Suns fired head coach Mike Budenholzer after one season with the team.
- On May 1, 2025, the Sacramento Kings hired Doug Christie as their full-time head coach.
- On May 2, 2025, Gregg Popovich stepped down as Spurs head coach after 29 seasons with the team. Assistant coach Mitch Johnson was named the head coach.
- On May 2, 2025, the Memphis Grizzlies hired Tuomas Iisalo as their full-time head coach.
- On May 22, 2025, the Denver Nuggets hired David Adelman as their full-time head coach.
- On June 3, 2025, the New York Knicks fired head coach Tom Thibodeau after five seasons with the team.
- On June 6, 2025, the Phoenix Suns hired Jordan Ott as their head coach.
- On July 7, 2025, the New York Knicks hired Mike Brown as their head coach.

==== In-season ====
- On October 23, 2025, the Portland Trail Blazers named Tiago Splitter as interim head coach, after Chauncey Billups was placed on leave by the NBA due to a federal gambling investigation.
- On November 15, 2025, the New Orleans Pelicans fired head coach Willie Green after four seasons with the team. Assistant coach James Borrego was named interim head coach.

== Preseason ==
In addition to regular preseason games hosted at NBA teams' own arenas, the NBA often hosts neutral site preseason games (either in domestic non-NBA markets or foreign markets) or against non-NBA teams. Listed below are only those neutral site or preseason games.

=== Domestic neutral site games ===
Date	Teams	Arena	Location	Winner	Reference
October 3	Phoenix Suns vs. Los Angeles Lakers	Acrisure Arena	Palm Desert, California	Phoenix Suns	
October 4	Minnesota Timberwolves vs. Denver Nuggets	Pechanga Arena	San Diego, California	Minnesota Timberwolves	
October 4	Orlando Magic vs. Miami Heat	José Miguel Agrelot Coliseum	San Juan, Puerto Rico	Orlando Magic	
October 5	Oklahoma City Thunder vs. Charlotte Hornets	North Charleston Coliseum	North Charleston, South Carolina	Oklahoma City Thunder	
October 6	Oklahoma City Thunder vs. Dallas Mavericks	Dickies Arena	Fort Worth, Texas	Dallas Mavericks	
October 6	Denver Nuggets vs. Toronto Raptors	Rogers Arena	Vancouver, British Columbia	Denver Nuggets	
October 14	Houston Rockets vs. New Orleans Pelicans	Legacy Arena	Birmingham, Alabama	Houston Rockets	
October 15	Memphis Grizzlies vs. Charlotte Hornets	First Horizon Coliseum	Greensboro, North Carolina	Charlotte Hornets	
October 15	Dallas Mavericks vs. Los Angeles Lakers	T-Mobile Arena	Paradise, Nevada	Dallas Mavericks	

=== International games ===
Date	Teams	Arena	Location	Winner	Reference
October 2	Philadelphia 76ers vs. New York Knicks	Etihad Arena	Abu Dhabi, United Arab Emirates	New York Knicks	
October 4	New York Knicks vs. Philadelphia 76ers	Etihad Arena	Abu Dhabi, United Arab Emirates	New York Knicks	
October 10	Phoenix Suns vs. Brooklyn Nets	Venetian Arena	Macau, China	Phoenix Suns	
October 12	Brooklyn Nets vs. Phoenix Suns	Venetian Arena	Macau, China	Brooklyn Nets	

=== Non-NBA opponents ===
Date	Teams	Arena	Location	Winner	Reference
October 3	Melbourne United vs. New Orleans Pelicans	Rod Laver Arena	Melbourne, Australia	New Orleans Pelicans	
October 4	Hapoel Jerusalem B.C. @ Brooklyn Nets	Barclays Center	New York City, New York	Brooklyn Nets	
October 5	South East Melbourne Phoenix vs. New Orleans Pelicans	Rod Laver Arena	Melbourne, Australia	New Orleans Pelicans	
October 6	Guangzhou Loong Lions @ San Antonio Spurs	Frost Bank Center	San Antonio, Texas	San Antonio Spurs	
October 9	Guangzhou Loong Lions @ Los Angeles Clippers	Frontwave Arena	Oceanside, California	Los Angeles Clippers	
October 13	Guangzhou Loong Lions @ Minnesota Timberwolves	Target Center	Minneapolis, Minnesota	Minnesota Timberwolves	

== Regular season ==
The NBA released the regular season schedule on August 14, with select games announced in advance of the full schedule release.

=== International games ===
Date	Teams	Arena	Location	Reference	Winner
NBA Mexico City Game 2025
November 1	Detroit Pistons vs. Dallas Mavericks	Mexico City Arena	Mexico City, Mexico		Detroit Pistons
NBA Berlin Game 2026
January 15	Memphis Grizzlies vs. Orlando Magic	Uber Arena	Berlin, Germany		Orlando Magic
NBA London Game 2026
January 18	Orlando Magic vs. Memphis Grizzlies	The O2 Arena	London, United Kingdom		Memphis Grizzlies

=== NBA Cup ===
The NBA Cup returned for the 2025–26 season, with the same basic structure:

- All games except the championship final counting towards the regular-season standings.
- Six intraconference pools of five (three pools per conference).
- This season, the group games against each of the other teams in their pool (two at home and two on the road), were held primarily on Fridays between October 31 and November 28. Group games were also played on Tuesday, November 25 and Wednesday, November 26.
- The winners of each pool (three teams per conference) and two wild-card teams (one team per conference) advanced to a single-elimination tournament held on December 9, 10, 13 and 16.
- To compensate, the NBA's regular-season scheduling formula was modified so only 80 games for each team were initially announced during the offseason. The first two rounds of the tournament counted as regular-season games 81 and 82. The championship game was an extra 83rd game that did not count toward the regular season. Teams that did not qualify for the in-season tournament knockout round, or were eliminated in the quarterfinals, were scheduled additional games against other teams that were eliminated in the same conference (if possible) and round to reach 82 games.
- The semifinals and championship game were held at T-Mobile Arena in Paradise, Nevada for the third consecutive season.

=== Standings ===
Eastern Conference

Atlantic Division	W	L	PCT	GB	Home	Road	Div	GP
y – Boston Celtics	56	26	.683	–	30‍–‍11	26‍–‍15	10‍–‍6	82
x – New York Knicks	53	29	.646	3.0	30‍–‍10	23‍–‍19	14‍–‍3	82
x – Toronto Raptors	46	36	.561	10.0	24‍–‍17	22‍–‍19	5‍–‍12	82
x – Philadelphia 76ers	45	37	.549	11.0	23‍–‍18	22‍–‍19	9‍–‍7	82
Brooklyn Nets	20	62	.244	36.0	12‍–‍29	8‍–‍33	3‍–‍13	82

Central Division	W	L	PCT	GB	Home	Road	Div	GP
c – Detroit Pistons	60	22	.732	–	32‍–‍9	28‍–‍13	12‍–‍4	82
x – Cleveland Cavaliers	52	30	.634	8.0	27‍–‍14	25‍–‍16	10‍–‍5	82
Milwaukee Bucks	32	50	.390	28.0	19‍–‍22	13‍–‍28	9‍–‍7	82
Chicago Bulls	31	51	.378	29.0	18‍–‍23	13‍–‍28	4‍–‍12	82
Indiana Pacers	19	63	.232	41.0	11‍–‍29	8‍–‍34	4‍–‍12	82

Southeast Division	W	L	PCT	GB	Home	Road	Div	GP
y – Atlanta Hawks	46	36	.561	–	24‍–‍17	22‍–‍19	9‍–‍7	82
x – Orlando Magic	45	37	.549	1.0	26‍–‍16	19‍–‍21	9‍–‍8	82
pi – Charlotte Hornets	44	38	.537	2.0	21‍–‍20	23‍–‍18	11‍–‍5	82
pi – Miami Heat	43	39	.524	3.0	26‍–‍15	17‍–‍24	10‍–‍7	82
Washington Wizards	17	65	.207	29.0	11‍–‍30	6‍–‍35	2‍–‍14	82

Western Conference

Northwest Division	W	L	PCT	GB	Home	Road	Div	GP
z – Oklahoma City Thunder	64	18	.780	–	34‍–‍8	30‍–‍10	12‍–‍4	82
x – Denver Nuggets	54	28	.659	10.0	28‍–‍13	26‍–‍15	11‍–‍5	82
x – Minnesota Timberwolves	49	33	.598	15.0	26‍–‍15	23‍–‍18	9‍–‍7	82
x – Portland Trail Blazers	42	40	.512	22.0	24‍–‍17	18‍–‍23	7‍–‍9	82
Utah Jazz	22	60	.268	42.0	14‍–‍27	8‍–‍33	1‍–‍15	82

Pacific Division	W	L	PCT	GB	Home	Road	Div	GP
y – Los Angeles Lakers	53	29	.646	–	28‍–‍13	25‍–‍16	9‍–‍7	82
x – Phoenix Suns	45	37	.549	8.0	25‍–‍16	20‍–‍21	10‍–‍6	82
pi – Los Angeles Clippers	42	40	.512	11.0	23‍–‍18	19‍–‍22	10‍–‍6	82
pi – Golden State Warriors	37	45	.451	16.0	22‍–‍19	15‍–‍26	7‍–‍9	82
Sacramento Kings	22	60	.268	31.0	15‍–‍26	7‍–‍34	4‍–‍12	82

Southwest Division	W	L	PCT	GB	Home	Road	Div	GP
y – San Antonio Spurs	62	20	.756	–	32‍–‍8	30‍–‍12	13‍–‍3	82
x – Houston Rockets	52	30	.634	10.0	30‍–‍11	22‍–‍19	10‍–‍6	82
New Orleans Pelicans	26	56	.317	36.0	17‍–‍24	9‍–‍32	7‍–‍9	82
Dallas Mavericks	26	56	.317	36.0	16‍–‍25	10‍–‍31	4‍–‍12	82
Memphis Grizzlies	25	57	.305	37.0	14‍–‍27	11‍–‍30	6‍–‍10	82

==== By conference ====
Eastern Conference
#	Team	W	L	PCT	GB	GP
1	c – Detroit Pistons *	60	22	.732	–	82
2	y – Boston Celtics *	56	26	.683	4.0	82
3	x – New York Knicks	53	29	.646	7.0	82
4	x – Cleveland Cavaliers	52	30	.634	8.0	82
5	x – Toronto Raptors	46	36	.561	14.0	82
6	y – Atlanta Hawks *	46	36	.561	14.0	82
7	x – Philadelphia 76ers	45	37	.549	15.0	82
8	x – Orlando Magic	45	37	.549	15.0	82
9	pi – Charlotte Hornets	44	38	.537	16.0	82
10	pi – Miami Heat	43	39	.524	17.0	82
11	Milwaukee Bucks	32	50	.390	28.0	82
12	Chicago Bulls	31	51	.378	29.0	82
13	Brooklyn Nets	20	62	.244	40.0	82
14	Indiana Pacers	19	63	.232	41.0	82
15	Washington Wizards	17	65	.207	43.0	82

Western Conference
#	Team	W	L	PCT	GB	GP
1	z – Oklahoma City Thunder *	64	18	.780	–	82
2	y – San Antonio Spurs *	62	20	.756	2.0	82
3	x – Denver Nuggets	54	28	.659	10.0	82
4	y – Los Angeles Lakers *	53	29	.646	11.0	82
5	x – Houston Rockets	52	30	.634	12.0	82
6	x – Minnesota Timberwolves	49	33	.598	15.0	82
7	x – Phoenix Suns	45	37	.549	19.0	82
8	x – Portland Trail Blazers	42	40	.512	22.0	82
9	pi – Los Angeles Clippers	42	40	.512	22.0	82
10	pi – Golden State Warriors	37	45	.451	27.0	82
11	New Orleans Pelicans	26	56	.317	38.0	82
12	Dallas Mavericks	26	56	.317	38.0	82
13	Memphis Grizzlies	25	57	.305	39.0	82
14	Sacramento Kings	22	60	.268	42.0	82
15	Utah Jazz	22	60	.268	42.0	82

Notes

- z – Clinched home court advantage for the entire playoffs
- c – Clinched home court advantage for the conference playoffs
- y – Clinched division title
- pi – Clinched play-in tournament spot (locked into a play-in spot but not able to clinch a playoff spot directly)
- ps – Clinched postseason (at least a play-in spot but can still clinch a playoff spot directly)
- x – Clinched playoff spot
- * – Division leader

=== Postponed games ===
- January 8: Heat vs. Bulls due to condensation on the court.
- January 24: Warriors vs. Timberwolves due to the killing of Alex Pretti.
- January 25: Nuggets vs. Grizzlies and Mavericks vs. Bucks due to the January 2026 North American winter storm.

== Play-in tournament ==
The top six seeds in each conference advanced to the main rounds of the 2026 NBA playoffs, while the next four seeds participated in a Page playoff system tournament from April 14–17, 2026. The 7th-place team hosted the 8th-place team in the double-chance round needing to win one game to advance, with the winner clinching the 7th seed in the playoffs. The 9th-place team hosted the 10th-place team in the elimination round requiring two wins to advance, with the loser being eliminated from the contention. The loser in the double-chance round hosted the elimination-round game-winner, with the winner clinching the 8th seed and the loser being eliminated.

=== Eastern Conference ===
Play-in games
7	Philadelphia	109
8	Orlando	97
9	Charlotte	127 (OT)
10	Miami	126

No. 8 seed game
8	Orlando	121
9	Charlotte	90

Final seeds
7	Philadelphia	No. 7 seed
8	Orlando	No. 8 seed

Bold Game winner
Italic Team with home-court advantage

=== Western Conference ===
Play-in games
7	Phoenix	110
8	Portland	114
9	LA Clippers	121
10	Golden State	126

No. 8 seed game
7	Phoenix	111
10	Golden State	96

Final seeds
8	Portland	No. 7 seed
7	Phoenix	No. 8 seed

Bold Game winner
Italic Team with home-court advantage

== Playoffs ==
The playoffs began on April 18, 2026.

=== Bracket ===
First round	Conference semifinals
E1	Detroit*	4
E8	Orlando	3
E1	Detroit*	3
E4	Cleveland	4
E4	Cleveland	4
E5	Toronto	3
Eastern Conference
E3	New York	4
E6	Atlanta*	2
E3	New York	4
E7	Philadelphia	0
E2	Boston*	3
E7	Philadelphia	4
W1	Oklahoma City*	4
W8	Phoenix	0
W1	Oklahoma City*	4
W4	LA Lakers*	0
W4	LA Lakers*	4
W5	Houston	2
Western Conference
W3	Denver	2
W6	Minnesota	4
W6	Minnesota	2
W2	San Antonio*	4
W2	San Antonio*	4
W7	Portland	1

Conference finals
E4	Cleveland	0
E3	New York	4
W1	Oklahoma City*	3
W2	San Antonio*	4

NBA Finals
E3	New York	4
W2	San Antonio*	1

- * Division winner
- Bold Series winner
- Italic Team with home-court advantage

== Statistics ==
=== Individual statistic leaders ===
Category	Player	Team(s)	Statistic
Points per game	Luka Dončić	Los Angeles Lakers	33.5
Rebounds per game	Nikola Jokić	Denver Nuggets	12.9
Assists per game	Nikola Jokić	Denver Nuggets	10.7
Steals per game	Ausar Thompson	Detroit Pistons	2.0
Blocks per game	Victor Wembanyama	San Antonio Spurs	3.1
Turnovers per game	Luka Dončić	Los Angeles Lakers	3.9
Fouls per game	Wendell Carter Jr.	Orlando Magic	3.4
Minutes per game	Tyrese Maxey	Philadelphia 76ers	38.0
FG%	Rudy Gobert	Minnesota Timberwolves	68.2
FT%	Cam Spencer	Memphis Grizzlies	94.0
3P%	Luke Kennard	Atlanta/L.A. Lakers	47.8
Efficiency per game	Nikola Jokić	Denver Nuggets	32.2
Double-doubles	Karl-Anthony Towns	New York Knicks	57
Triple-doubles	Nikola Jokić	Denver Nuggets	34

=== Individual game highs ===
Category	Player	Team	Statistic
Points	Bam Adebayo	Miami Heat	83
Rebounds	Scottie Barnes	Toronto Raptors	25
Assists	Ryan Nembhard	Dallas Mavericks	23
Steals	Herbert Jones	New Orleans Pelicans	8
Steals	Tyrese Maxey	Philadelphia 76ers	8
Blocks	Victor Wembanyama	San Antonio Spurs	9
Three-pointers	Stephen Curry	Golden State Warriors	12
Three-pointers	Trey Murphy III	New Orleans Pelicans	12

=== Team statistic leaders ===
Category	Team	Statistic
Points per game	Denver Nuggets	122.0
Rebounds per game	Houston Rockets	47.9
Assists per game	Atlanta Hawks	30.1
Steals per game	Detroit Pistons	10.4
Blocks per game	Detroit Pistons	6.4
Turnovers per game	Boston Celtics	11.4
Fouls per game	Dallas Mavericks	18.3
FG%	Los Angeles Lakers	50.2
FT%	Los Angeles Clippers	82.2
3P%	Denver Nuggets	39.6
+/−	Oklahoma City Thunder	11.6

== Awards ==
=== Yearly awards ===
2025–26 NBA awards
Award	Recipient(s)	Finalists
Most Valuable Player	Shai Gilgeous-Alexander (Oklahoma City Thunder)	Nikola Jokić (Denver Nuggets); Victor Wembanyama (San Antonio Spurs)
Defensive Player of the Year	Victor Wembanyama (San Antonio Spurs)	Chet Holmgren (Oklahoma City Thunder); Ausar Thompson (Detroit Pistons)
Rookie of the Year	Cooper Flagg (Dallas Mavericks)	V. J. Edgecombe (Philadelphia 76ers); Kon Knueppel (Charlotte Hornets)
Sixth Man of the Year	Keldon Johnson (San Antonio Spurs)	Tim Hardaway Jr. (Denver Nuggets); Jaime Jaquez Jr. (Miami Heat)
Most Improved Player	Nickeil Alexander-Walker (Atlanta Hawks)	Deni Avdija (Portland Trail Blazers); Jalen Duren (Detroit Pistons)
Clutch Player of the Year	Shai Gilgeous-Alexander (Oklahoma City Thunder)	Anthony Edwards (Minnesota Timberwolves); Jamal Murray (Denver Nuggets)
Coach of the Year	Joe Mazzulla (Boston Celtics)	J. B. Bickerstaff (Detroit Pistons); Mitch Johnson (San Antonio Spurs)
Executive of the Year	Brad Stevens (Boston Celtics)	
NBA Sportsmanship Award	Derrick White (Boston Celtics)	Bam Adebayo (Miami Heat); Harrison Barnes (San Antonio Spurs); Shai Gilgeous-Alexander (Oklahoma City Thunder); Al Horford (Golden State Warriors); T. J. McConnell (Indiana Pacers)
Twyman–Stokes Teammate of the Year Award	DeAndre Jordan (New Orleans Pelicans)	Desmond Bane (Orlando Magic); Jalen Brunson (New York Knicks); Pat Connaughton (Charlotte Hornets); De'Aaron Fox (San Antonio Spurs); Jeff Green (Houston Rockets); Jrue Holiday (Portland Trail Blazers); Duncan Robinson (Detroit Pistons); Marcus Smart (Los Angeles Lakers); Jayson Tatum (Boston Celtics); Garrett Temple (Toronto Raptors); Jaylin Williams (Oklahoma City Thunder)
Community Assist Award		
Kareem Abdul-Jabbar Social Justice Champion Award	Bam Adebayo (Miami Heat)	Harrison Barnes (San Antonio Spurs); Jaylen Brown (Boston Celtics); Tobias Harris (Detroit Pistons); Larry Nance Jr. (Cleveland Cavaliers)
NBA Hustle Award	Moussa Diabaté (Charlotte Hornets)	

- All-NBA First Team:
  - Cade Cunningham, Detroit Pistons
  - Luka Dončić, Los Angeles Lakers
  - Shai Gilgeous-Alexander, Oklahoma City Thunder
  - Nikola Jokić, Denver Nuggets
  - Victor Wembanyama, San Antonio Spurs
- All-NBA Second Team:
  - Jaylen Brown, Boston Celtics
  - Jalen Brunson, New York Knicks
  - Kevin Durant, Houston Rockets
  - Kawhi Leonard, Los Angeles Clippers
  - Donovan Mitchell, Cleveland Cavaliers
- All-NBA Third Team:
  - Tyrese Maxey, Philadelphia 76ers
  - Jamal Murray, Denver Nuggets
  - Jalen Johnson, Atlanta Hawks
  - Chet Holmgren, Oklahoma City Thunder
  - Jalen Duren, Detroit Pistons

- NBA All-Defensive First Team:
  - Victor Wembanyama, San Antonio Spurs
  - Chet Holmgren, Oklahoma City Thunder
  - Ausar Thompson, Detroit Pistons
  - Rudy Gobert, Minnesota Timberwolves
  - Derrick White, Boston Celtics
- NBA All-Defensive Second Team:
  - Scottie Barnes, Toronto Raptors
  - Cason Wallace, Oklahoma City Thunder
  - Bam Adebayo, Miami Heat
  - O.G. Anunoby, New York Knicks
  - Dyson Daniels, Atlanta Hawks

- NBA All-Rookie First Team:
  - Cooper Flagg, Dallas Mavericks
  - Kon Knueppel, Charlotte Hornets
  - V. J. Edgecombe, Philadelphia 76ers
  - Dylan Harper, San Antonio Spurs
  - Cedric Coward, Memphis Grizzlies
- NBA All-Rookie Second Team:
  - Ace Bailey, Utah Jazz
  - Jeremiah Fears, New Orleans Pelicans
  - Collin Murray-Boyles, Toronto Raptors
  - Maxime Raynaud, Sacramento Kings
  - Derik Queen, New Orleans Pelicans

=== Players of the Week ===
The following players were named the Eastern and Western Conference Players of the Week.

Week	Eastern Conference	Western Conference	Ref
October 21–26	Giannis Antetokounmpo (Milwaukee Bucks) (1/1)	Victor Wembanyama (San Antonio Spurs) (1/2)	
October 27 – November 2	Tyrese Maxey (Philadelphia 76ers) (1/2)	Shai Gilgeous-Alexander (Oklahoma City Thunder) (1/4)	
November 3–9	Cade Cunningham (Detroit Pistons) (1/1)	Nikola Jokić (Denver Nuggets) (1/3)	
November 10–16	Jalen Johnson (Atlanta Hawks) (1/2)	Nikola Jokić (Denver Nuggets) (2/3)	
November 17–23	Donovan Mitchell (Cleveland Cavaliers) (1/1)	Shai Gilgeous-Alexander (Oklahoma City Thunder) (2/4)	
November 24–30	Jalen Brunson (New York Knicks) (1/2)	Luka Dončić (Los Angeles Lakers) (1/4)	
December 1–7	Jaylen Brown (Boston Celtics) (1/3)	Jamal Murray (Denver Nuggets) (1/1)	
December 15–21	Jalen Brunson (New York Knicks) (2/2)	Jaren Jackson Jr. (Memphis Grizzlies) (1/1)	
December 22–28	Jaylen Brown (Boston Celtics) (2/3)	Kawhi Leonard (Los Angeles Clippers) (1/1)	
December 29 – January 4	Tyrese Maxey (Philadelphia 76ers) (2/2)	Deni Avdija (Portland Trail Blazers) (1/1)	
January 5–11	Scottie Barnes (Toronto Raptors) (1/1)	Peyton Watson (Denver Nuggets) (1/1)	
January 12–18	Bam Adebayo (Miami Heat) (1/2)	Shai Gilgeous-Alexander (Oklahoma City Thunder) (3/4)	
January 19–25	Immanuel Quickley (Toronto Raptors) (1/1)	Luka Dončić (Los Angeles Lakers) (2/4)	
January 26 – February 1	Brandon Miller (Charlotte Hornets) (1/1)	Dillon Brooks (Phoenix Suns) (1/1)	
February 2–8	Jalen Johnson (Atlanta Hawks) (2/2)	Stephon Castle (San Antonio Spurs) (1/1)	
February 23 – March 1	Jalen Duren (Detroit Pistons) (1/1)	Anthony Edwards (Minnesota Timberwolves) (1/1)	
March 2–8	Tyler Herro (Miami Heat) (1/1)	Victor Wembanyama (San Antonio Spurs) (2/2)	
March 9–15	Bam Adebayo (Miami Heat) (2/2)	Luka Dončić (Los Angeles Lakers) (3/4)	
March 16–22	LaMelo Ball (Charlotte Hornets) (1/1)	Luka Dončić (Los Angeles Lakers) (4/4)	
March 23–29	Jayson Tatum (Boston Celtics) (1/1)	Nikola Jokić (Denver Nuggets) (3/3)	
March 30 – April 5	Jaylen Brown (Boston Celtics) (3/3)	Shai Gilgeous-Alexander (Oklahoma City Thunder) (4/4)	
April 6–12	Brandon Ingram (Toronto Raptors) (1/1)	LeBron James (Los Angeles Lakers) (1/1)	

=== Players of the Month ===
The following players were named the Eastern and Western Conference Players of the Month.

Month	Eastern Conference	Western Conference	Ref
October/November	Cade Cunningham (Detroit Pistons) (1/2)	Nikola Jokić (Denver Nuggets) (1/1)	
December	Jalen Brunson (New York Knicks) (1/1)	Shai Gilgeous-Alexander (Oklahoma City Thunder) (1/1)	
January	Jaylen Brown (Boston Celtics) (1/1)	Luka Dončić (Los Angeles Lakers) (1/2)	
February	Cade Cunningham (Detroit Pistons) (2/2)	Victor Wembanyama (San Antonio Spurs) (1/1)	
March	Jalen Johnson (Atlanta Hawks) (1/1)	Luka Dončić (Los Angeles Lakers) (2/2)	

=== Defensive Players of the Month ===
The following players were named the Eastern and Western Conference Defensive Players of the Month.

Month	Eastern Conference	Western Conference	Ref
October/November	Scottie Barnes (Toronto Raptors) (1/1)	Cason Wallace (Oklahoma City Thunder) (1/1)	
December	Isaiah Stewart (Detroit Pistons) (1/1)	Chet Holmgren (Oklahoma City Thunder) (1/1)	
January	Ausar Thompson (Detroit Pistons) (1/2)	Victor Wembanyama (San Antonio Spurs) (1/3)	
February	Derrick White (Boston Celtics) (1/1)	Victor Wembanyama (San Antonio Spurs) (2/3)	
March	Ausar Thompson (Detroit Pistons) (2/2)	Victor Wembanyama (San Antonio Spurs) (3/3)	

=== Rookies of the Month ===
The following players were named the Eastern and Western Conference Rookies of the Month.

Month	Eastern Conference	Western Conference	Ref
October/November	Kon Knueppel (Charlotte Hornets) (1/4)	Cooper Flagg (Dallas Mavericks) (1/3)	
December	Kon Knueppel (Charlotte Hornets) (2/4)	Cooper Flagg (Dallas Mavericks) (2/3)	
January	Kon Knueppel (Charlotte Hornets) (3/4)	Cooper Flagg (Dallas Mavericks) (3/3)	
February	Kon Knueppel (Charlotte Hornets) (4/4)	Dylan Harper (San Antonio Spurs) (1/1)	
March	V. J. Edgecombe (Philadelphia 76ers) (1/1)	Maxime Raynaud (Sacramento Kings) (1/1)	

=== Coaches of the Month ===
The following coaches were named the Eastern and Western Conference Coaches of the Month.

Month	Eastern Conference	Western Conference	Ref
October/November	J. B. Bickerstaff (Detroit Pistons) (1/1)	Mark Daigneault (Oklahoma City Thunder) (1/2)	
December	Joe Mazzulla (Boston Celtics) (1/1)	Mitch Johnson (San Antonio Spurs) (1/2)	
January	Charles Lee (Charlotte Hornets) (1/1)	Jordan Ott (Phoenix Suns) (1/1)	
February	Kenny Atkinson (Cleveland Cavaliers) (1/1)	Mitch Johnson (San Antonio Spurs) (2/2)	
March	Quin Snyder (Atlanta Hawks) (1/1)	Mark Daigneault (Oklahoma City Thunder) (2/2)	

== Arena changes ==
- The Wells Fargo Center, the home of the Philadelphia 76ers, was renamed to Xfinity Mobile Arena on August 14, 2025, under a new naming rights deal with Xfinity Mobile, a subsidiary of Comcast (Spectacor, a subsidiary company, owns the arena).
- PHX Arena, the home of the Phoenix Suns, was renamed to Mortgage Matchup Center on October 2, 2025.

== Uniform and logo changes ==
- The Orlando Magic unveiled a new logo and uniforms, taking inspiration from the team's original look from 1989 to 2000. The "shooting ball with stars" logo returned with an updated look while the wordmarks were updated with a star replacing the letter "A" in the words "Orlando" and "Magic", which are reflected in their new uniforms. The team's "Icon" uniform was changed to a blue color while the "Statement" uniform was changed to a black and blue pattern inspired by the team's original warmup gear.
- The Los Angeles Lakers unveiled a new purple Statement Edition uniform. The Lakers' white wordmark is outlined in gold, and the white jersey numbers have a gold drop shadow. The design removes the previous black side panel, leaving only purple and gold, with "Los Angeles Lakers" along the side trim. The primary logo appears at the center of the shorts, while the "LA" mark is shown on both sides for the first time on a core uniform. "Leave a Legacy" is placed above the jock tag, and "17" at the back of the neck represents the team's championships.
- The Phoenix Suns unveiled a new black Statement Edition uniform. The uniform takes inspiration from Arizona's sunsets with a purple and orange The Valley gradient throughout its design. A bold Phoenix wordmark is placed on the chest at an angle where the left side is leaning downwards. The team's sunburst logo was reimagined with the Valley-inspired gradient streaks across the shorts, while the classic sunburst logo is on the center of the beltline. The Suns would wear this uniform for the first time on October 31 against the Utah Jazz in their first 2025 NBA Cup game.
- The NBA, in partnership with Topps, announced that players who played their first NBA game would wear an "NBA Debut" patch on their uniforms, which were then removed and authenticated after the game on an autographed, one-on-one numbered rookie card. Additionally, previous season's winners of the Most Valuable Player, Rookie of the Year and Defensive Player of the Year would wear a gold NBA logo patch on the back of their uniforms for the entire season. All award winners and members of last season's All-NBA, All-Rookie and All-Defensive teams also wore a special patch on their uniforms (or lapels in the case of Coach of the Year and Executive of the Year winners) during their first game of the season. These patches depicted specific silhouettes tied to each player's award or year-end team selection. After the game, these uniforms are auctioned off by Sotheby's throughout the season. LeBron James would also wear a special patch on his uniform commemorating his record 23rd NBA season, starting with the January 12 game at the Sacramento Kings. This design featured his trademark chalk toss silhouette in front of each of the four colors corresponding to the teams he played: navy for his first stint with the Cleveland Cavaliers, red for the Miami Heat, wine for his second stint with the Cavaliers, and gold for the Los Angeles Lakers.

== Media ==
=== Television ===
==== National ====
This was the first season of new 11-year deals with the ESPN family of networks, NBC Sports and Amazon Prime Video. The ESPN networks renewed their contract with a modified schedule. NBC and Prime Video both replaced TNT, with NBC returning to televising the NBA for the first time since 2001–02, and Prime Video signing its first U.S. national contract with the league. The new contracts expanded the number of nationally-televised games (excluding games on NBA TV) from approximately 172 to 247, with all teams appearing on a national game at least twice, and an increased number of games on broadcast television and streaming as opposed to cable television.

===== Linear television =====
- ESPN continued to primarily carry Wednesday night regular season games and the NBA All-Star Celebrity Game, along with producing NBA Saturday Primetime and NBA Sunday Showcase on ABC, and the slate of five ESPN/ABC simulcasts on Christmas Day. Games only on ESPN continued to be non-exclusive and co-exist with the teams' regional broadcasts.
  - ESPN no longer carried a regular Friday package, but continued to carry a limited selection of Friday-night games as the schedule permitted.
  - This season, NBA Saturday Primetime aired on seven weeks between January and March (including two doubleheaders on January 24 and February 7); due to the postponement of the Golden State–Minnesota game on January 24, the Detroit–Minnesota game on March 28 was instead added to ABC's Saturday schedule. NBA Sunday Showcase was then on five Sunday afternoons in February and March (with the middle three as doubleheaders).
  - On the final day of the regular season, April 12, two games with playoff implications was flexed into ESPN's doubleheader; with ESPN dropping Sunday Night Baseball, this doubleheader moved from the afternoon to the evening and primetime.
- NBC took over opening night, the Tuesday night package, a tripleheader of Martin Luther King Jr. Day games, and the NBA All-Star Game from TNT.
  - NBC branded the opening night doubleheader as NBA Tip-Off. Most Tuesday night doubleheaders were then branded as Coast 2 Coast Tuesdays, with games scheduled at 8 p.m. ET/5 p.m. PT and 11 p.m. ET/8 p.m. PT respectively; NBC affiliates had the option to show one or both games at their discretion (with the 8 p.m. game generally shown in the East, the 11 p.m. game in the West). (Note: Multiple references:)
  - On December 23, 29, and 30, NBC aired standard, national doubleheaders with 8 and 10:30 p.m. ET windows instead of the Coast 2 Coast Tuesdays format.
  - NBC carried a late-season Sunday Night Basketball package, airing on most weeks between February and April, with February 1, March 29 and April 5 scheduled as doubleheaders.
  - Unusual for a broadcast television package, a select number of these games were non-exclusive and could co-exist with the teams' regional broadcasts.
  - Spanish-language broadcasts of Sunday Night Basketball, the Mexico City Global Game, and the All-Star Game were carried by Telemundo.
  - NBCUniversal relaunched its NBCSN cable network in November 2025, which simulcast the rest of what were originally Peacock-exclusive NBA telecasts (with overflow channels being available if more than one game airs at the same time). On February 24, both Coast 2 Coast Tuesday games aired on Peacock/NBCSN in 7:30 and 10:00 p.m. ET windows due to NBC News coverage of the State of the Union address.
  - Due to NBC Sports airing the 2026 Winter Olympics and Super Bowl LX during the weeks of February 6–22, its NBA coverage was limited to the All-Star Game and then one weekend of Sunday Night Basketball as a lead-out to the Olympics Closing Ceremony. NBC Sports cross-promoted these events under the banner "Legendary February".
- NBA TV continued to televise select games throughout the regular season when the other national broadcasters were not airing games, most of which simulcast from regional broadcasters. NBA TV had additional games during the weeks when NBC was airing the Olympics. Operations of NBA TV were taken in-house by the league, moving from TNT's Atlanta studios to the league's offices in Secaucus, New Jersey.

===== Streaming =====
- Amazon Prime Video took over the Friday night doubleheader package from ESPN, and the late-season Thursday night package from TNT. Prime Video's Thursday night doubleheaders streamed on most weeks between January and April following the conclusion of Thursday Night Football. Prime Video also carried Saturday afternoon games on eight select weeks between January and April, as well as the Berlin and London Global games, and the entire knockout round of the NBA Cup. A select number of Prime Video's games were non-exclusive and co-existed with the teams' regional broadcasts.
- ESPN Unlimited streamed all ESPN-produced games, including a simulcast of Celtics vs. Bulls on January 24, while both ESPN+ (ESPN Select) and Disney+ continued to simulcast select ABC and ESPN games.
- Peacock streamed all games carried by NBC. The streaming service was also awarded a package of Monday night games throughout most the regular season, a night that was previously given to NBA TV since none of the other national broadcasters regularly aired Monday games. Branded as NBA Monday, Peacock had one, two, or occasionally three games per-week, except on December 29 which aired instead on the NBC broadcast network). Peacock also had the Mexico City Global Game, and one exclusive Martin Luther King Jr. Day game. A select number of these regular season games were non-exclusive and co-existed with the teams' regional broadcasts.
- The league-owned NBA League Pass will continue to offer out-of-market games, and live access to NBA TV.

===== Personnel =====
- ESPN and ABC revamped their roster of commentators for this season. Analyst Tim Legler replaced Doris Burke on the lead broadcast team with play-by-play Mike Breen, analyst Richard Jefferson, and sideline reporter Lisa Salters. SEC Network sideline reporter Alyssa Lang also joined ESPN's NBA coverage as a sideline reporter.
- ESPN reached an agreement with TNT to continue producing its Inside the NBA and NBA Tip-Off studio shows for ESPN with no change in personnel, airing during 20 selected regular season nights and then throughout the playoffs. ESPN's existing studio show, NBA Countdown, airs for all other games.
- NBC's new team includes play-by-play announcers Mike Tirico, Terry Gannon, Noah Eagle, Michael Grady, Mark Followill, Kate Scott, John Michael, Kevin Ray and Jason Benetti; color commentators Reggie Miller, Jamal Crawford, Grant Hill, Austin Rivers, Derek Fisher, Brian Scalabrine, Robbie Hummel and Brad Daugherty; sideline reporters Zora Stephenson, Jordan Cornette, Ashley ShahAhmadi, and John Fanta; studio hosts Maria Taylor (Tuesday and Sunday) and Ahmed Fareed (Monday); studio analysts Carmelo Anthony, Vince Carter and Tracy McGrady; front office insider Grant Liffmann; digital insider Chris Mannix; and special contributor Michael Jordan. Tirico called his first NBA game on a regular basis since the 2015–16 season with ESPN. (Note: Multiple references:)
- Amazon's new team includes play-by-play announcers Ian Eagle, Kevin Harlan, Michael Grady and Eric Collins; color commentators Stan Van Gundy, Steve Nash, Dwyane Wade, Candace Parker, Brent Barry, Dell Curry and Jim Jackson; sideline reporters Cassidy Hubbarth, Kristina Pink, Allie Clifton and JayDee Dyer; studio host Taylor Rooks; studio analysts Dirk Nowitzki, Blake Griffin, Udonis Haslem, John Wall, Rudy Gay and Kyle Lowry; front office analyst Swin Cash; league insider Chris Haynes; and feature reporter Marcus Thompson. (Note: Multiple references:)

==== Local ====
- Prior to the season, the Hawks, Cavaliers, Heat, Timberwolves and Bucks reached an extension with FanDuel Sports Network to keep their local games on the network until at least the 2026–27 season. The Heat later announced an agreement with WPLG, a local over-the-air station in Miami, to simulcast 12 regular season games with FanDuel Sports Network.
- In September 2025, the Suns extended its agreement with Arizona's Family Sports through the 2027–28 season.
- The Magic announced an agreement with Hearst Television to simulcast 10 games over-the-air in both Orlando and Tampa Bay. Games will air on WESH or WKCF in Orlando, and WMOR-TV in Tampa Bay.

===== FanDuel Sports Network teams =====
In December 2025, the Wall Street Journal reported that DAZN was in advanced talks to acquire a majority stake in Main Street Sports Group, the owner of the FanDuel Sports Networks. If the deal went through, DAZN and Main Street would integrate their live streaming platform in the United States and collaborate on programming. Afterwards, Sports Business Journal reported that Main Street had missed a payment to the St. Louis Cardinals baseball team and that the company would be forced to dissolve operations at the end of the 2025–26 season if the deal with DAZN did not go through by the end of January 2026. In January, Sports Business Journal reported that Main Street had missed payments to "several, if not all 13" of its NBA teams. As a result, Main Street and the teams with missed payments entered a 15-day grace period. Two days later, Sports Business Journal reported that talks with DAZN had stopped progressing and all MLB teams except the Tampa Bay Rays had not received payments on-time.

On January 8, 2026, all nine MLB teams with agreements with FanDuel Sports Network terminated their contracts with the company due to missed payments. In February 2026, most former FanDuel MLB teams announced production and distribution deals with MLB Local Media. Puck reported that Main Street intends to wind down FanDuel Sports Network in mid-April after the close of the 2025–26 NBA and NHL seasons.

==== International ====
- In Mexico, Brazil, France, Italy, Spain, Germany, the United Kingdom and Ireland, Prime Video will stream 20 additional regular-season games, along with the games being already aired in the United States, a conference final (for 2026, the Western Conference finals) and the NBA Finals in 6 of the 11 years of the deal.
- ESPN will additionally air its slate of games in Latin America, sub-Saharan Africa, Oceania and the Netherlands, and will air games through Disney+ in select markets in Asia and Europe.
- NBC will additionally air its slate of games on Sky Sports in the United Kingdom and Italy, and will distribute games in the Caribbean and sub-Saharan Africa.
- In the Philippines, Disney+ will stream selected games, including most ESPN/ABC games, and Prime Video will exclusively stream the NBA Finals. Cignal TV also aired games except the finals.
- TNT Sports will air games internationally in Poland, Denmark, Finland, Norway, Sweden and Latin America (excluding Brazil and Mexico).
- NBA TV international will also air games in select countries worldwide.

=== Radio ===
==== National ====
- ESPN Radio has rights to select regular-season games, all playoff games and rights to the NBA Finals.
- This is the sixth season of the league's muti-year deal with SiriusXM and SiriusXM Canada to simulcast all 30 teams' local regular-season and postseason broadcasts.

== Notable occurrences ==
- The league introduced a new circular design for the shot clock.
- On September 10, 2025, the NBA approved a rule change that will consider any shot taken within the final three seconds of the first three quarters that is taken from at least 36 feet away on any play that starts in the backcourt as a team shot attempt and not an individual one.
- On October 13, 2025, the Milwaukee Bucks signed Alex Antetokounmpo to a two-way deal. With his brothers Giannis and Thanasis, this marks the first time in NBA history that three brothers have been on the same team's roster at the same time.
- On October 23, 2025, Portland Trail Blazers coach Chauncey Billups, Miami Heat guard Terry Rozier, and former Cleveland Cavaliers player and assistant coach Damon Jones were among those indicted for allegedly conducting rigged sports betting and poker games.
- On October 23, 2025, the Oklahoma City Thunder became the first team in NBA history to head to double overtime in both of their first two games of the season.
- On October 24, 2025, Luka Dončić became the fourth player in NBA history to open a season with back-to-back 40+ point games. He also became the first player in NBA history to open a season with back-to-back games of 40+ points, 10+ rebounds, and 5+ assists.
- On October 24, 2025, Giannis Antetokounmpo became the first player in NBA history to have 60+ points, 30+ rebounds, and 10+ assists in the first two games of a season.
- On October 29, 2025, Nikola Jokić set the record for most triple-doubles in under 30 minutes, with 17. The previous record was held by Russell Westbrook. He also tied the record for most consecutive triple-doubles to start the season, with 4; the record is also held by Westbrook and Oscar Robertson.
- On November 10, 2025, the Cleveland Cavaliers set the record for most consecutive regular-season games with at least 10 three-pointers, with 98. The previous record was held by the Houston Rockets with a streak from 2018 to 2020. The streak ended on December 3, 2025, at 110 games.
- On November 11, 2025, general manager Nico Harrison was fired from the Dallas Mavericks, nine months after orchestrating the Luka Dončić trade.
- On November 14, 2025, Russell Westbrook became the second player after LeBron James to record 25,000 career points and 10,000 career assists.
- On November 18, 2025, LeBron James set the record for most seasons played, with 23, breaking the record previously held by Vince Carter.
- On December 4, 2025, LeBron James's streak of 1,297 games of scoring 10 or more points came to an end after he scored 8 points in a victory over the Toronto Raptors.
- On December 6, 2025, the New York Knicks opened the game with a 23–0 scoring run against the Utah Jazz, the largest game-opening run without an opponent scoring since the league began keeping detailed play-by-play records in the 1997–98 season. The total record for most consecutive points to start a game before the opponent scored was 29, set by the Los Angeles Lakers against the Sacramento Kings on February 4, 1987.
- On December 10, 2025, the Oklahoma City Thunder tied the record for the best 25-game start, going 24–1 with a victory over the Phoenix Suns. This matches the record set by the 2015–16 Golden State Warriors.
- On December 14, 2025, Stephen Curry broke the all-time record for most 40-point games after the age of 30, surpassing Michael Jordan with a 48-point game in a 131–139 loss to the Trailblazers.
- On December 15, 2025, Cooper Flagg became the youngest player to score 40 points, at the age of 18 years, 359 days. The previous record of 19 years, 88 days was held by LeBron James.
- On December 20, 2025, LeBron James became the oldest player to score 30 points, at the age of 40 years, 355 days. The previous record of 40 years, 294 days was held by Dirk Nowitzki.
- On December 22, 2025, Kon Knueppel set the record for the fewest games to make 100 three-pointers, with 29. The previous record of 41 was held by Lauri Markkanen.
- On December 25, 2025, Nikola Jokić set the record for the most points in a single overtime period, with 18. The previous record of 17 was held by Stephen Curry. In the same game, he set the record for the most points in a 15/15/15 game with 56. The previous record of 53 was held by James Harden.
- On January 8, 2026, Rick Carlisle became the 11th head coach to record 1,000 regular season wins.
- On January 10, 2026, Cody Williams set the record for the worst single-game plus/minus, recording a –60 in a loss to the Charlotte Hornets. The previous record of –58 was held by Scoot Henderson and Jeremiah Robinson-Earl.
- On January 28, 2026, LeBron James became the first player to play 60,000 career minutes in the regular season.
- On January 29, 2026, Cooper Flagg set the record for most points in a game by a teenager, with 49 in a loss to the Charlotte Hornets. The previous record of 45 was held by Cliff Robinson.
- On February 12, 2026, LeBron James became the oldest player to record a triple-double, at the age of 41 years, 44 days. The previous record of 40 years, 127 days was held by Karl Malone.
- On February 24, 2026, Kon Knueppel set the record for the fewest games to make 200 three-pointers, with 58. The previous record of 69 was held by Duncan Robinson.
- On February 26, 2026, Kon Knueppel set the record for the most three-pointers in a season by a rookie, with 207. The previous record was held by Keegan Murray.
- On March 1, 2026, LeBron James surpassed Kareem Abdul-Jabbar for the most points scored after the age of 40, with 1,942.
- On March 1, 2026, Shai Gilgeous-Alexander surpassed Wilt Chamberlain for the most consecutive road games scoring 20 points, with 59.
- On March 3, 2026, the Philadelphia 76ers became the first team in NBA history to lose three home games by 40 or more points, with a 131–91 loss to the San Antonio Spurs.
- On March 5, 2026, LeBron James surpassed Kareem Abdul-Jabbar for the most career field goals made, with 15,838.
- On March 9, 2026, Shai Gilgeous-Alexander became the second player to have 35 points and 15 assists with no turnovers in a game, joining LeBron James.
- On March 10, 2026, Bam Adebayo scored the second-most points in a game in NBA history, with 83 points in a 150–129 victory over the Washington Wizards. He made 36 of 43 free throws, both NBA records. The previous record of 28 free throws was held by Wilt Chamberlain and Adrian Dantley, and the previous record of 39 free throw attempts was held by Dwight Howard.
- On March 12, 2026, Shai Gilgeous-Alexander surpassed Wilt Chamberlain for the most consecutive games scoring 20 points, with 127.
- On March 19, 2026, the Detroit Pistons secured their first 50-win season since 2007–08.
- On March 21, 2026, LeBron James surpassed Robert Parish for the most regular season games played, with 1,612.
- On March 21, 2026, Kevin Durant passed Michael Jordan for 5th on the league's scoring list.
- On March 25, 2026, the Minnesota Timberwolves set a record for the largest overtime comeback (13 points) in the play-by-play era.
- On March 25, 2026, Kevin Durant passed Dirk Nowitzki for 8th on the career field goals list.
- On March 25, 2026, Nikola Jokić became the first player to record 15 points, 15 rebounds, and 15 assists in consecutive games.
- On March 25, 2026, the NBA board of governors authorized the exploration of expansion teams in Seattle and Las Vegas.
- On March 26, 2026, Kon Knueppel set the record for the fewest games to make 250 three-pointers, with 72. The previous record of 79 was held by Duncan Robinson.
- On March 29, 2026, the Toronto Raptors set an NBA record in the play-by-play era by scoring 31 unanswered points against the Orlando Magic. The previous record of 30 was held by the Denver Nuggets against the Oklahoma City Thunder.
- On March 30, 2026, LeBron James recorded the 125th triple-double of his career with 21 points, 12 assists, and 10 rebounds to break his own record for the oldest player to record a triple-double, at the age of 41 years, 90 days.
- On April 1, 2026, LeBron James surpassed Kareem Abdul-Jabbar for the most wins in the regular season and the postseason, with 1,229.
- On April 1, 2026, Nikola Jokić became the second player to average a triple-double in consecutive seasons, joining Russell Westbrook, who did so in three consecutive seasons.
- On April 2, 2026, Toumani Camara set the record for most personal fouls drawn in a season, with 100. The NBA first began tracking the stat in the 2005–06 season. The previous record was held by Anderson Varejão.
- On April 3, 2026, Cooper Flagg became the youngest player to score 50 points, at the age of 19 years, 103 days. The previous record of 20 years, 52 days was held by Brandon Jennings.
- On April 6, 2026, the Memphis Grizzlies tied the record for the most three-pointers in a game with 29 in a 126–142 loss to the Cleveland Cavaliers. The record is also held by the 2024–25 Boston Celtics and the 2020–21 Milwaukee Bucks.
- On April 10, 2026, the Boston Celtics tied the record for the most three-pointers in a game with 29 in a 144–118 win against the New Orleans Pelicans. In this game, the Celtics recorded their fourth 80-point first half of the season, setting an NBA record for 80-point first halves in a season.
- On April 10, 2026, John Konchar and Bez Mbeng of the Utah Jazz and Jahmai Mashack of the Memphis Grizzlies became the first trio in NBA history to each record a triple-double in the same game.
- On April 10, 2026, LeBron James became the fourth player in NBA history to record 12,000 career assists and the first non-point guard to do so.
- Nikola Jokić became the first player to lead the league in both rebounds per game and assists per game.
- Kon Knueppel became the first rookie to lead the league in three-pointers.
- The Detroit Pistons became the first team in NBA history to win 60 games after losing 60 games two seasons prior.
- On April 13, 2026, LeBron James became the first player in NBA history to win the Player of the Week award 70 times.

== See also ==
- Bam Adebayo's 83-point game
