= J. B. Bickerstaff =

American basketball coach (born 1979)

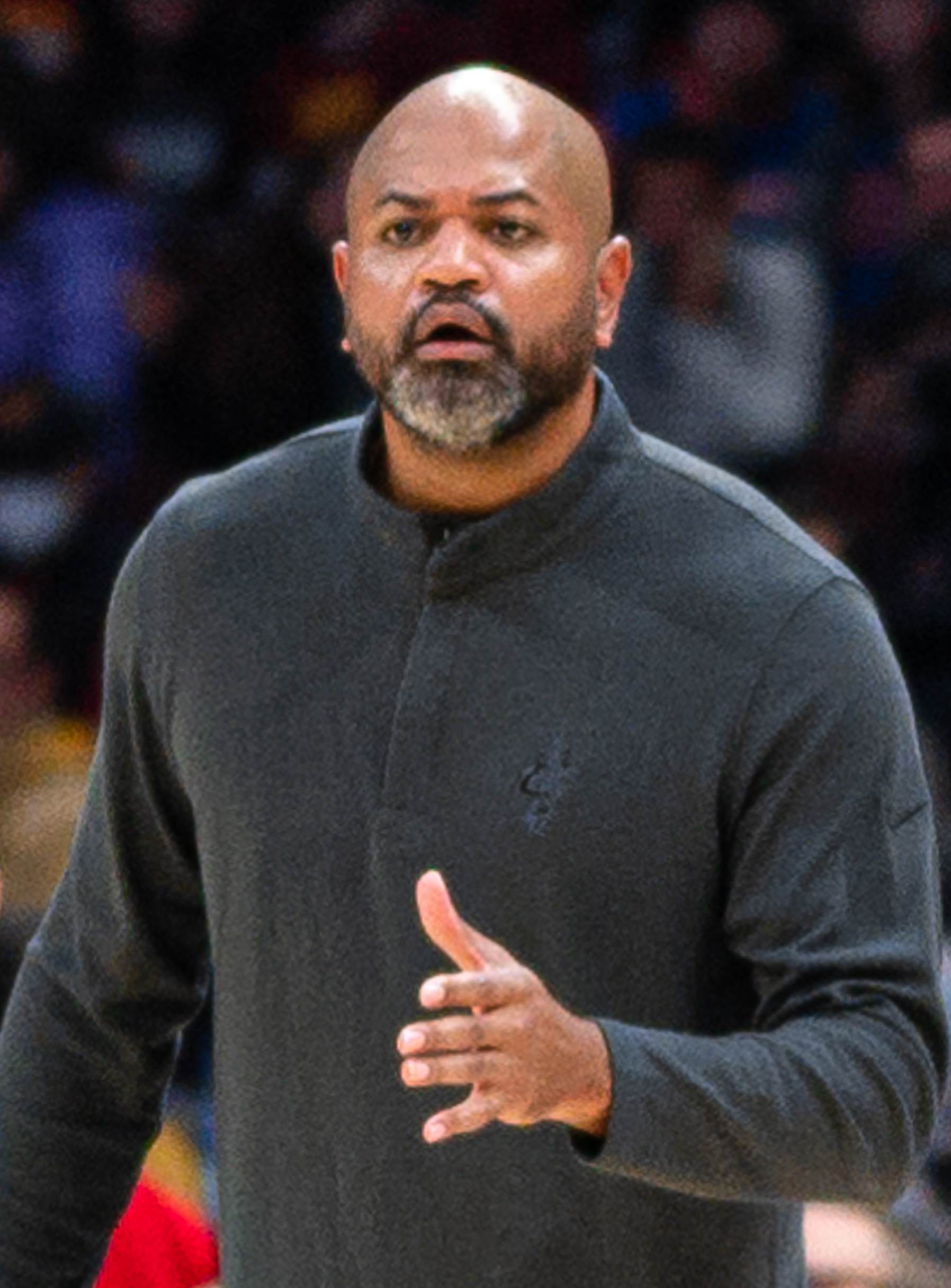
- Bickerstaff with the Cleveland Cavaliers in 2021

Detroit Pistons
- Title: Head coach
- League: NBA

Personal information
- Born: March 10, 1979 (age 47) Denver, Colorado, U.S.
- Listed height: 6 ft 6 in (1.98 m)
- Listed weight: 190 lb (86 kg)

Career information
- High school: East (Denver, Colorado)
- College: Oregon State (1996–1998); Minnesota (1999–2001)
- NBA draft: 2001: undrafted
- Position: Forward
- Coaching career: 2004–present

Career history

Coaching
- 2004–2007: Charlotte Bobcats (assistant)
- 2007–2011: Minnesota Timberwolves (assistant)
- 2011–2015: Houston Rockets (assistant)
- 2015–2016: Houston Rockets (interim)
- 2016–2017: Memphis Grizzlies (associate)
- 2017–2019: Memphis Grizzlies
- 2019–2020: Cleveland Cavaliers (assistant/assoc. HC)
- 2020–2024: Cleveland Cavaliers
- 2024–present: Detroit Pistons

Career highlights
- As head coach: NBCA Coach of the Year (2026); NBA All-Star Game head coach (2026)

John-Blair Bickerstaff (born March 10, 1979) is an American professional basketball coach who is the head coach of the Detroit Pistons of the National Basketball Association (NBA). He was previously the head coach for the Memphis Grizzlies and the Cleveland Cavaliers, and has also been an assistant coach for several other NBA teams.

== College career ==
Bickerstaff played his first two collegiate seasons at Oregon State and finished his career at the University of Minnesota. He averaged 10.9 points and 6.1 rebounds as a senior for the Golden Gophers. Bickerstaff suffered season-ending injuries in both seasons he played with the Golden Gophers.

Bickerstaff was the director of men's basketball operations for the Golden Gophers during the 2002–03 season. He joined the radio broadcast team for the Minnesota Timberwolves during the 2003–04 season.

== Coaching career ==
=== Assistant coach (2004–2011) ===
Bickerstaff started his coaching career with the Charlotte Bobcats as an assistant coach in 2004 where he worked under his father, head coach and general manager Bernie Bickerstaff. He spent three seasons (2004–2007) with the Bobcats as an assistant coach, before spending four (2007–2011) seasons as an assistant coach for the Minnesota Timberwolves.

=== Houston Rockets (2011-2016) ===
Bickerstaff was hired as an assistant coach by the Houston Rockets on July 14, 2011. He was made interim head coach of the Rockets on November 18, 2015, after Kevin McHale was fired. On that same day, he made his coaching debut against the Portland Trail Blazers with a 108–103 overtime victory.

After the season, Bickerstaff informed the Rockets that he had withdrawn his name for the head coaching search, effectively ending his tenure with the Houston Rockets.

=== Memphis Grizzlies (2016-2019) ===
On June 8, 2016, Bickerstaff was hired by the Memphis Grizzlies to be the associate head coach.

On November 27, 2017, Bickerstaff was promoted as the Grizzlies' interim head coach after the firing of David Fizdale. On May 1, 2018, he was announced as the new permanent head coach of the Grizzlies. On April 11, 2019, the Grizzlies fired Bickerstaff after the team failed to reach the playoffs.

=== Cleveland Cavaliers (2019–2024) ===
On May 19, 2019, the Cleveland Cavaliers named Bickerstaff associate head coach.

On February 19, 2020, head coach John Beilein resigned as head coach of the Cavaliers, and Bickerstaff was announced as the new head coach. On March 10, the Cavaliers announced that they had agreed on a multi-year contract with Bickerstaff. On December 25, 2021, the Cavaliers signed Bickerstaff to a multi-year contract extension. Bickerstaff was fired on May 23, 2024, by the Cavaliers.

=== Detroit Pistons (2024–present) ===
On July 3, 2024, Bickerstaff became the new head coach of the Detroit Pistons. On December 23, Bickerstaff would lead the Pistons to their 15th win of the season. This would be one more win than the Pistons had for the entirety of the 2023–24 season. On March 3, 2025, Bickerstaff was named the NBA Eastern Conference Coach of the Month for February 2025 after guiding the Pistons to a 9–3 record, which included an eight-game winning streak and a 4–0 road mark. On March 28, 2025, Bickerstaff would help lead the Pistons to their first playoff appearance since the 2018–19 season. On March 30, 2025, Bickerstaff was ejected from the Pistons game against the Minnesota Timberwolves after an on-court brawl broke out. Pistons players Isaiah Stewart, Ron Holland, and Marcus Sasser were ejected, along with Timberwolves players Donte DiVincenzo and Naz Reid. Timberwolves assistant coach Pablo Prigioni was also ejected. Bickerstaff finished in 2nd place in Coach of the Year voting in 2025.

The Detroit Pistons opened the 2025–26 season with a thirteen game win streak. He was named the Eastern Conference Coach of the Month for October/November 2025.

On May 4, 2026, Bickerstaff and the Pistons agreed to a contract extension.

== Head coaching record ==
Legend
Regular season	G	Games coached	W	Games won	L	Games lost	W–L %	Win–loss %
Playoffs	PG	Playoff games	PW	Playoff wins	PL	Playoff losses	PW–L %	Playoff win–loss %

Team	Year	G	W	L	W–L%	Finish	PG	PW	PL	PW–L%	Result
Houston	2015–16	71	37	34	.521	4th in Southwest	5	1	4	.200	Lost in first round
Memphis	2017–18	63	15	48	.238	5th in Southwest	—	—	—	—	Missed playoffs
Memphis	2018–19	82	33	49	.402	3rd in Southwest	—	—	—	—	Missed playoffs
Cleveland	2019–20	11	5	6	.455	5th in Central	—	—	—	—	Missed playoffs
Cleveland	2020–21	72	22	50	.306	4th in Central	—	—	—	—	Missed playoffs
Cleveland	2021–22	82	44	38	.537	3rd in Central	—	—	—	—	Missed playoffs
Cleveland	2022–23	82	51	31	.622	2nd in Central	5	1	4	.200	Lost in first round
Cleveland	2023–24	82	48	34	.585	2nd in Central	12	5	7	.417	Lost in conference semifinals
Detroit	2024–25	82	44	38	.537	4th in Central	6	2	4	.333	Lost in first round
Detroit	2025–26	82	60	22	.732	1st in Central	14	7	7	.500	Lost in conference semifinals
Career		709	359	350	.506		42	16	26	.381	

== Personal life ==
Bickerstaff is the son of former NBA coach Bernie Bickerstaff, who is working for the Pistons in their front office serving as senior basketball advisor. Bickerstaff and his wife have three kids. He has been a Philadelphia Eagles fan since childhood.
