= 2025–26 Detroit Pistons season =

2025–26 NBA season by team

- Division champions
- Head coach: J. B. Bickerstaff
- President: Trajan Langdon
- Owner: Tom Gores
- Arena: Little Caesars Arena

Results
- Record: 60–22 (.732)
- Place: Division: 1st (Central); Conference: 1st (Eastern)
- Playoff finish: Conference semifinals (lost to Cavaliers 3–4)
- Stats at Basketball Reference

Local media
- Television: FanDuel Sports Network Detroit; WMYD (five simulcasts)
- Radio: WXYT

The 2025–26 Detroit Pistons season was the 85th season of the franchise, the 78th in the National Basketball Association (NBA), and the ninth in Midtown Detroit.

From October 29 to November 26, 2025, the Pistons won 13 consecutive games, tied for the longest in franchise history. On March 1, 2026, following a win over the Orlando Magic, the Pistons surpassed their win total from the 2024–25 season. On March 19, the Pistons secured their first 50-win season since 2007–08. The next day, the Pistons clinched a playoff berth for the second consecutive season following a win over the Golden State Warriors.

On March 31, the Pistons won the Central Division title for the first time since 2008 following a win over the Toronto Raptors. On April 4, the Pistons clinched the No. 1 seed in the Eastern Conference for the first time since 2007 following a win over the Philadelphia 76ers. The Pistons finished the regular season with the third-best record in franchise history at 60–22, their first 60-win season since 2005–06. They became the first team in NBA history to win 60 games after losing 60 games two seasons prior.

Matching up with the Orlando Magic in the first round, the Pistons secured their first home playoff win since 2008 on April 22, breaking their NBA record 11-game home postseason losing streak. The Pistons overcame a 3–1 deficit to eliminate the Magic, becoming the 15th team in NBA history to accomplish the feat. They also won their first playoff series since 2008. However, their season came to an end in the Eastern Conference semifinals when the Pistons were eliminated by the Cleveland Cavaliers in seven games despite winning the first two games.

== Draft ==
Round	Pick	Player	Position	Nationality	College
2	37	Chaz Lanier	Shooting guard	United States	Tennessee

The Pistons entered the draft with one second-round pick, which was originally owned by the Toronto Raptors and acquired through a trade with the Dallas Mavericks in 2023. Their original first-round pick was conveyed to the Minnesota Timberwolves after the Pistons qualified for the 2025 NBA playoffs that made it fall outside the top-13 protection, while their original second-round pick was conveyed to the Milwaukee Bucks based on their 2024–25 season finish.

== Roster ==
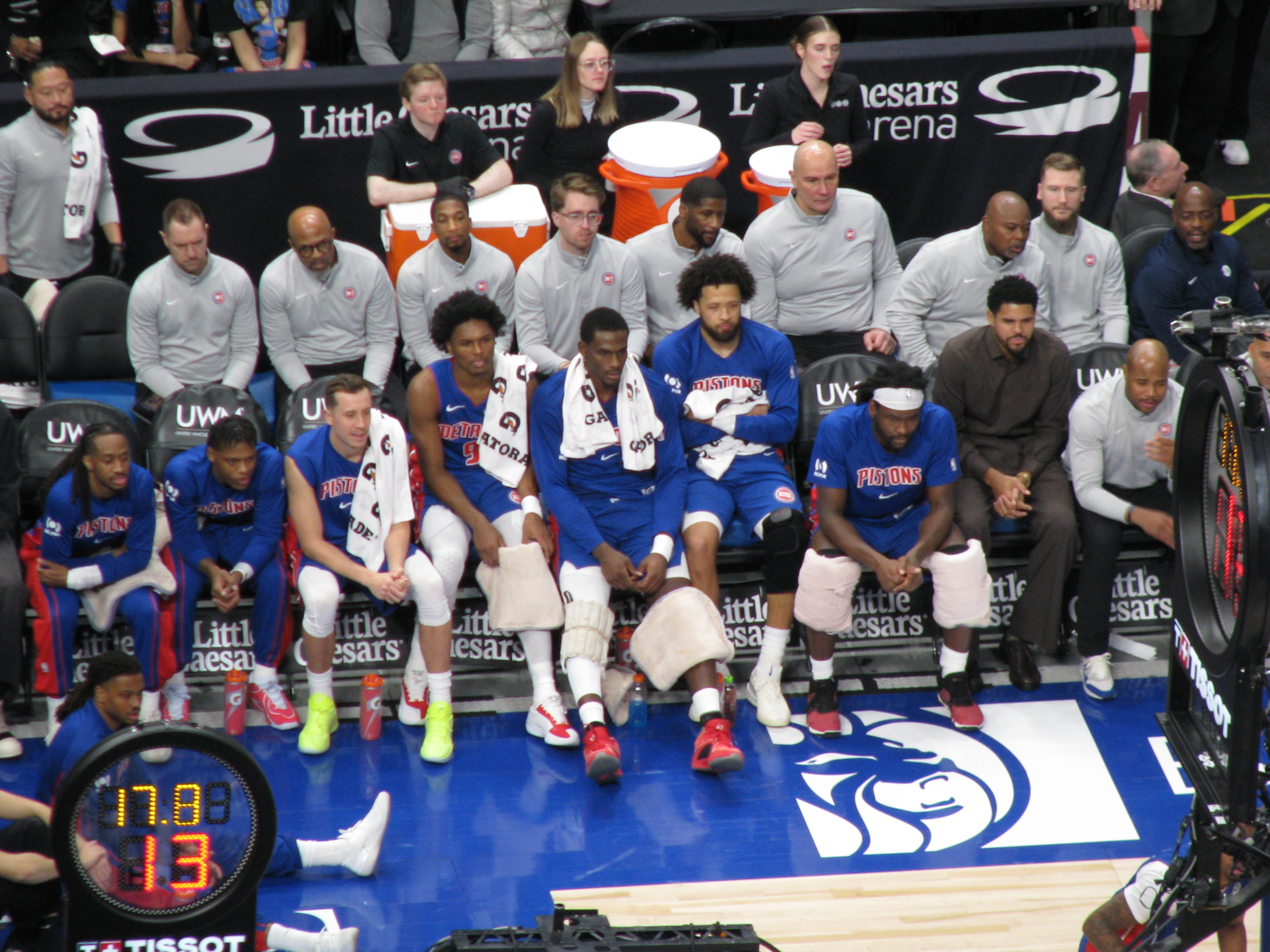
Pistons bench during a regular season game against the Milwaukee Bucks on December 6, 2025

2025–26 Detroit Pistons roster
Players

Pos.	No.	Player	Height	Weight	DOB	From
G	2	Cade Cunningham	6 ft 6 in (1.98 m)	220 lb (100 kg)	2001-09-25	Oklahoma State
C	0	Jalen Duren	6 ft 10 in (2.08 m)	250 lb (113 kg)	2003-11-18	Memphis
G	31	Javonte Green	6 ft 5 in (1.96 m)	205 lb (93 kg)	1993-07-23	Radford
F	12	Tobias Harris	6 ft 8 in (2.03 m)	226 lb (103 kg)	1992-07-15	Tennessee
F	5	Ron Holland II	6 ft 8 in (2.03 m)	206 lb (93 kg)	2005-07-07	Duncanville HS (TX)
G/F	27	Kevin Huerter	6 ft 6 in (1.98 m)	198 lb (90 kg)	1998-08-27	Maryland
G	24	Daniss Jenkins	6 ft 3 in (1.91 m)	165 lb (75 kg)	2001-08-17	St. John's
F	13	Isaac Jones (TW)	6 ft 9 in (2.06 m)	245 lb (111 kg)	2000-07-11	Washington State
G	20	Chaz Lanier	6 ft 3 in (1.91 m)	206 lb (93 kg)	2001-12-19	Tennessee
G	3	Caris LeVert	6 ft 7 in (2.01 m)	205 lb (93 kg)	1994-08-25	Michigan
G	14	Wendell Moore Jr. (TW)	6 ft 5 in (1.96 m)	215 lb (98 kg)	2001-09-18	Duke
F/C	7	Paul Reed	6 ft 9 in (2.06 m)	210 lb (95 kg)	1999-06-26	DePaul
F	55	Duncan Robinson	6 ft 7 in (2.01 m)	215 lb (98 kg)	1994-04-22	Michigan
G	25	Marcus Sasser	6 ft 2 in (1.88 m)	195 lb (88 kg)	2000-09-21	Houston
F	35	Tolu Smith	6 ft 11 in (2.11 m)	245 lb (111 kg)	2001-07-26	Mississippi State
C	28	Isaiah Stewart	6 ft 8 in (2.03 m)	250 lb (113 kg)	2001-05-22	Washington
G/F	9	Ausar Thompson	6 ft 6 in (1.98 m)	205 lb (93 kg)	2003-01-30	Pine Crest (FL)

Coaches
Head coach
- J. B. Bickerstaff
Assistant(s)
- Jerome Allen
- Kevin Burleson
- Josh Estes
- Jarrett Jack
- Sidney Lowe
- Vitaly Potapenko
- Steve Scalzi
- Fred Vinson
- Luke Walton

Legend
- (DP) Unsigned draft pick
- (FA) Free agent
- (S) Suspended
- (GL) On assignment to G League affiliate
- (TW) Two-way affiliate player
- Injured

Roster
Updated: April 7, 2026

== Standings ==
=== Division ===
Central Division	W	L	PCT	GB	Home	Road	Div	GP
c – Detroit Pistons	60	22	.732	–	32‍–‍9	28‍–‍13	12‍–‍4	82
x – Cleveland Cavaliers	52	30	.634	8.0	27‍–‍14	25‍–‍16	10‍–‍5	82
Milwaukee Bucks	32	50	.390	28.0	19‍–‍22	13‍–‍28	9‍–‍7	82
Chicago Bulls	31	51	.378	29.0	18‍–‍23	13‍–‍28	4‍–‍12	82
Indiana Pacers	19	63	.232	41.0	11‍–‍29	8‍–‍34	4‍–‍12	82

=== Conference ===
Eastern Conference
#	Team	W	L	PCT	GB	GP
1	c – Detroit Pistons *	60	22	.732	–	82
2	y – Boston Celtics *	56	26	.683	4.0	82
3	x – New York Knicks	53	29	.646	7.0	82
4	x – Cleveland Cavaliers	52	30	.634	8.0	82
5	x – Toronto Raptors	46	36	.561	14.0	82
6	y – Atlanta Hawks *	46	36	.561	14.0	82
7	x – Philadelphia 76ers	45	37	.549	15.0	82
8	x – Orlando Magic	45	37	.549	15.0	82
9	pi – Charlotte Hornets	44	38	.537	16.0	82
10	pi – Miami Heat	43	39	.524	17.0	82
11	Milwaukee Bucks	32	50	.390	28.0	82
12	Chicago Bulls	31	51	.378	29.0	82
13	Brooklyn Nets	20	62	.244	40.0	82
14	Indiana Pacers	19	63	.232	41.0	82
15	Washington Wizards	17	65	.207	43.0	82

== Game log ==
=== Preseason ===
2025 preseason game log
Total: 2–2 (Home: 1–0; Road: 1–2)
Preseason: 2–2 (home: 1–0; road: 1–2)

Game	Date	Team	Score	High points	High rebounds	High assists	Location Attendance	Record
1	October 6	@ Memphis	W 128–112	Cade Cunningham (20)	Paul Reed (12)	Daniss Jenkins (6)	FedExForum; 12,517	1–0
2	October 9	@ Milwaukee	L 111–117	Cade Cunningham (26)	Cunningham, Klintman, Reed (6)	Cade Cunningham (6)	Fiserv Forum; 11,364	1–1
3	October 14	@ Cleveland	L 100–118	Harris, Jenkins (19)	Duren, Harris, Robinson, Thompson (5)	Daniss Jenkins (6)	Rocket Arena; 17,561	1–2
4	October 16	Washington	W 119–89	Jalen Duren (20)	Ausar Thompson (7)	Cade Cunningham (12)	Little Caesars Arena; 11,088	2–2

2025–26 preseason schedule

=== Regular season ===
2025–26 game log
Total: 60–22 (Home: 32–9; Road: 28–13)
October: 3–2 (home: 2–1; road: 1–1)

Game	Date	Team	Score	High points	High rebounds	High assists	Location Attendance	Record
1	October 22	@ Chicago	L 111–115	Cade Cunningham (23)	Isaiah Stewart (10)	Cade Cunningham (10)	United Center; 21,381	0–1
2	October 24	@ Houston	W 115–111	Cade Cunningham (21)	Paul Reed (9)	Cade Cunningham (9)	Toyota Center; 18,055	1–1
3	October 26	Boston	W 119–113	Cade Cunningham (25)	Jalen Duren (17)	Cade Cunningham (8)	Little Caesars Arena; 20,062	2–1
4	October 27	Cleveland	L 95–116	Cade Cunningham (12)	Isaiah Stewart (9)	Daniss Jenkins (5)	Little Caesars Arena; 18,933	2–2
5	October 29	Orlando	W 135–116	Cade Cunningham (30)	Jalen Duren (12)	Cade Cunningham (10)	Little Caesars Arena; 19,244	3–2

November: 13–2 (home: 6–1; road: 7–1)

Game	Date	Team	Score	High points	High rebounds	High assists	Location Attendance	Record
6	November 1	Dallas	W 122–110	Jalen Duren (33)	Jalen Duren (10)	Cade Cunningham (18)	Mexico City Arena; 20,385	4–2
7	November 3	@ Memphis	W 114–106	Cade Cunningham (33)	Isaiah Stewart (14)	Cade Cunningham (8)	FedExForum; 13,822	5–2
8	November 5	Utah	W 114–103	Cade Cunningham (31)	Jalen Duren (22)	Cade Cunningham (10)	Little Caesars Arena; 18,403	6–2
9	November 7	@ Brooklyn	W 125–107	Cade Cunningham (34)	Jalen Duren (11)	Cade Cunningham (10)	Barclays Center; 17,548	7–2
10	November 9	@ Philadelphia	W 111–108	Cade Cunningham (26)	Jalen Duren (16)	Cade Cunningham (11)	Xfinity Mobile Arena; 18,520	8–2
11	November 10	Washington	W 137–135 (OT)	Cade Cunningham (46)	Jalen Duren (14)	Cade Cunningham (11)	Little Caesars Arena; 17,994	9–2
12	November 12	Chicago	W 124–113	Paul Reed (28)	Paul Reed (13)	Daniss Jenkins (12)	Little Caesars Arena; 19,023	10–2
13	November 14	Philadelphia	W 114–105	Javonte Green (21)	Javonte Green (9)	Daniss Jenkins (8)	Little Caesars Arena; 20,062	11–2
14	November 17	Indiana	W 127–112	Jalen Duren (31)	Jalen Duren (15)	Jenkins, LeVert (8)	Little Caesars Arena; 19,058	12–2
15	November 18	@ Atlanta	W 120–112	Cade Cunningham (25)	Isaiah Stewart (9)	Cade Cunningham (10)	State Farm Arena; 17,353	13–2
16	November 22	@ Milwaukee	W 129–116	Cade Cunningham (29)	Cade Cunningham (8)	Cade Cunningham (10)	Fiserv Forum; 17,341	14–2
17	November 24	@ Indiana	W 122–117	Cade Cunningham (24)	Jalen Duren (12)	Cade Cunningham (6)	Gainbridge Fieldhouse; 17,009	15–2
18	November 26	@ Boston	L 114–117	Cade Cunningham (42)	Jalen Duren (16)	Cade Cunningham (5)	TD Garden; 19,156	15–3
19	November 28	Orlando	L 109–112	Cade Cunningham (39)	Cade Cunningham (13)	Cade Cunningham (11)	Little Caesars Arena; 20,062	15–4
20	November 29	@ Miami	W 138–135	Cade Cunningham (29)	Paul Reed (10)	Cade Cunningham (8)	Kaseya Center; 19,600	16–4

December: 9–4 (home: 5–0; road: 4–4)

Game	Date	Team	Score	High points	High rebounds	High assists	Location Attendance	Record
21	December 1	Atlanta	W 99–98	Jalen Duren (21)	Jalen Duren (11)	Cade Cunningham (8)	Little Caesars Arena; 19,008	17–4
22	December 3	@ Milwaukee	L 109–113	Tobias Harris (20)	Cade Cunningham (7)	Cade Cunningham (7)	Fiserv Forum; 16,256	17–5
23	December 5	Portland	W 122–116	Cade Cunningham (29)	Jalen Duren (8)	Cade Cunningham (9)	Little Caesars Arena; 19,907	18–5
24	December 6	Milwaukee	W 124–112	Cade Cunningham (23)	Jalen Duren (16)	Cade Cunningham (12)	Little Caesars Arena; 19,931	19–5
25	December 12	Atlanta	W 142–115	Isaiah Stewart (17)	Jalen Duren (7)	Caris LeVert (8)	Little Caesars Arena; 18,989	20–5
26	December 15	@ Boston	W 112–105	Cade Cunningham (32)	Harris, Stewart (7)	Cade Cunningham (10)	TD Garden; 19,156	21–5
27	December 18	@ Dallas	L 114–116 (OT)	Cade Cunningham (29)	Jalen Duren (13)	Cade Cunningham (9)	American Airlines Center; 19,600	21–6
28	December 20	Charlotte	W 112–86	Cade Cunningham (22)	Duren, Stewart (11)	Cade Cunningham (10)	Little Caesars Arena; 20,062	22–6
29	December 22	@ Portland	W 110–102	Jalen Duren (26)	Ausar Thompson (12)	Cade Cunningham (9)	Moda Center; 19,335	23–6
30	December 23	@ Sacramento	W 136–127	Tobias Harris (24)	Jalen Duren (13)	Cade Cunningham (14)	Golden 1 Center; 17,832	24–6
31	December 26	@ Utah	L 129–131	Cade Cunningham (29)	Tobias Harris (7)	Cade Cunningham (17)	Delta Center; 18,186	24–7
32	December 28	@ L.A. Clippers	L 99–112	Cade Cunningham (27)	Jalen Duren (14)	Cade Cunningham (9)	Intuit Dome; 17,927	24–8
33	December 30	@ L.A. Lakers	W 128–106	Cade Cunningham (27)	Jalen Duren (8)	Cade Cunningham (11)	Crypto.com Arena; 18,997	25–8

January: 10–4 (home: 6–3; road: 4–1)

Game	Date	Team	Score	High points	High rebounds	High assists	Location Attendance	Record
34	January 1	Miami	L 112–118	Cade Cunningham (31)	Cade Cunningham (8)	Cade Cunningham (11)	Little Caesars Arena; 20,062	25–9
35	January 4	@ Cleveland	W 114–110	Cade Cunningham (27)	Ronald Holland II (10)	Cade Cunningham (7)	Rocket Arena; 19,432	26–9
36	January 5	New York	W 121–90	Cade Cunningham (29)	Isaiah Stewart (9)	Cade Cunningham (13)	Little Caesars Arena; 20,032	27–9
37	January 7	Chicago	W 108–93	Isaiah Stewart (31)	Ausar Thompson (8)	Daniss Jenkins (15)	Little Caesars Arena; 19,501	28–9
38	January 10	L.A. Clippers	L 92–98	Duncan Robinson (20)	Tolu Smith (14)	Ausar Thompson (6)	Little Caesars Arena; 20,062	28–10
39	January 15	Phoenix	W 108–105	Duncan Robinson (19)	Jalen Duren (18)	Cade Cunningham (11)	Little Caesars Arena; 19,199	29–10
40	January 17	Indiana	W 121–78	Tied (16)	Jalen Duren (8)	Cunningham, Stewart (5)	Little Caesars Arena; 19,199	30–10
41	January 19	Boston	W 104–103	Tobias Harris (25)	Jalen Duren (9)	Cade Cunningham (14)	Little Caesars Arena; 19,996	31–10
42	January 21	@ New Orleans	W 112–104	Jalen Duren (20)	Jalen Duren (15)	Jenkins, Sasser (4)	Smoothie King Center; 15,502	32–10
43	January 23	Houston	L 104–111	Jalen Duren (18)	Ausar Thompson (8)	Cade Cunningham (8)	Little Caesars Arena; 20,062	32–11
44	January 25	Sacramento	W 139–116	Cade Cunningham (29)	Isaiah Stewart (8)	Cade Cunningham (11)	Little Caesars Arena; 20,062	33–11
45	January 27	@ Denver	W 109–107	Cunningham, Harris (22)	Duren, Harris (8)	Cade Cunningham (11)	Ball Arena; 19,734	34–11
46	January 29	@ Phoenix	L 96–114	Cade Cunningham (26)	Jalen Duren (13)	Cade Cunningham (7)	Mortgage Matchup Center; 17,071	34–12
47	January 30	@ Golden State	W 131–124	Cade Cunningham (29)	Jalen Duren (13)	Cade Cunningham (11)	Chase Center; 18,064	35–12

February: 9–2 (home: 5–2; road: 4–0)

Game	Date	Team	Score	High points	High rebounds	High assists	Location Attendance	Record
48	February 1	Brooklyn	W 130–77	Jalen Duren (21)	Jalen Duren (10)	Cade Cunningham (12)	Little Caesars Arena; 19,899	36–12
49	February 3	Denver	W 124–121	Cade Cunningham (29)	Jalen Duren (13)	Cade Cunningham (10)	Little Caesars Arena; 19,976	37–12
50	February 5	Washington	L 117–126	Cade Cunningham (30)	Ron Holland (10)	Cade Cunningham (8)	Little Caesars Arena; 19,401	37–13
51	February 6	New York	W 118–80	Daniss Jenkins (18)	Harris, Reed (6)	Cade Cunningham (7)	Little Caesars Arena; 20,062	38–13
52	February 9	@ Charlotte	W 110–104	Cade Cunningham (33)	Cade Cunningham (9)	Cade Cunningham (7)	Spectrum Center; 19,476	39–13
53	February 11	@ Toronto	W 113–95	Cade Cunningham (28)	Tobias Harris (11)	Cade Cunningham (9)	Scotiabank Arena; 19,120	40–13
All-Star Game
54	February 19	@ New York	W 126–111	Cade Cunningham (42)	Tobias Harris (10)	Cade Cunningham (13)	Madison Square Garden; 19,812	41–13
55	February 21	@ Chicago	W 126–110	Jalen Duren (26)	Jalen Duren (13)	Cade Cunningham (13)	United Center; 21,589	42–13
56	February 23	San Antonio	L 103–114	Jalen Duren (25)	Jalen Duren (14)	Cade Cunningham (10)	Little Caesars Arena; 20,062	42–14
57	February 25	Oklahoma City	W 124–116	Cunningham, Duren (29)	Jalen Duren (15)	Cade Cunningham (13)	Little Caesars Arena; 20,062	43–14
58	February 27	Cleveland	W 122–119 (OT)	Jalen Duren (33)	Jalen Duren (16)	Cade Cunningham (7)	Little Caesars Arena; 20,232	44–14

March: 11–7 (home: 6–2; road: 5–5)

Game	Date	Team	Score	High points	High rebounds	High assists	Location Attendance	Record
59	March 1	@ Orlando	W 106–92	Cade Cunningham (29)	Ausar Thompson (11)	Cade Cunningham (11)	Kia Center; 19,015	45–14
60	March 3	@ Cleveland	L 109–113	Jalen Duren (24)	Jalen Duren (14)	Cade Cunningham (14)	Rocket Arena; 19,432	45–15
61	March 5	@ San Antonio	L 106–121	Cade Cunningham (26)	Jalen Duren (7)	Cade Cunningham (8)	Frost Bank Center; 18,748	45–16
62	March 7	Brooklyn	L 105–107	Tobias Harris (18)	Jalen Duren (14)	Daniss Jenkins (9)	Little Caesars Arena; 20,062	45–17
63	March 8	@ Miami	L 110–121	Cade Cunningham (26)	Ron Holland II (7)	Cade Cunningham (10)	Kaseya Center; 19,700	45–18
64	March 10	@ Brooklyn	W 138–100	Jalen Duren (26)	Isaiah Stewart (8)	Cade Cunningham (15)	Barclays Center; 17,548	46–18
65	March 12	Philadelphia	W 131–109	Duncan Robinson (19)	Jalen Duren (10)	Cade Cunningham (13)	Little Caesars Arena; 20,062	47–18
66	March 13	Memphis	W 126–110	Jalen Duren (30)	Jalen Duren (13)	Cade Cunningham (15)	Little Caesars Arena; 20,062	48–18
67	March 15	@ Toronto	L 108–119	Cade Cunningham (33)	Jalen Duren (11)	Cade Cunningham (9)	Scotiabank Arena; 19,435	48–19
68	March 17	@ Washington	W 130–117	Jalen Duren (36)	Jalen Duren (12)	Daniss Jenkins (7)	Capital One Arena; 15,296	49–19
69	March 19	@ Washington	W 117–95	Jalen Duren (24)	Jalen Duren (11)	Caris LeVert (6)	Capital One Arena; 16,572	50–19
70	March 20	Golden State	W 115–101	Jalen Duren (23)	Daniss Jenkins (7)	Daniss Jenkins (8)	Little Caesars Arena; 20,062	51–19
71	March 23	L.A. Lakers	W 113–110	Daniss Jenkins (30)	Jalen Duren (11)	Daniss Jenkins (8)	Little Caesars Arena; 20,180	52–19
72	March 25	Atlanta	L 129–130 (OT)	Jalen Duren (26)	Jalen Duren (14)	Daniss Jenkins (10)	Little Caesars Arena; 18,921	52–20
73	March 26	New Orleans	W 129–108	Jalen Duren (30)	Jalen Duren (10)	Daniss Jenkins (9)	Little Caesars Arena; 18,940	53–20
74	March 28	@ Minnesota	W 109–87	Tobias Harris (18)	Jalen Duren (13)	Jalen Duren (5)	Target Center; 18,978	54–20
75	March 30	@ Oklahoma City	L 110–114 (OT)	Paul Reed (21)	Paul Reed (10)	Huerter, Jenkins (6)	Paycom Center; 18,203	54–21
76	March 31	Toronto	W 127–116	Jalen Duren (31)	Jalen Duren (9)	Tobias Harris (6)	Little Caesars Arena; 19,982	55–21

April: 5–1 (home: 2–0; road: 3–1)

Game	Date	Team	Score	High points	High rebounds	High assists	Location Attendance	Record
77	April 2	Minnesota	W 113–108	Daniss Jenkins (26)	Jalen Duren (14)	Ausar Thompson (9)	Little Caesars Arena; 20,062	56–21
78	April 4	@ Philadelphia	W 116–93	Tobias Harris (19)	Duren, Reed (7)	Daniss Jenkins (14)	Xfinity Mobile Arena; 19,746	57–21
79	April 6	@ Orlando	L 107–123	Duren, Jenkins (18)	Jalen Duren (9)	Daniss Jenkins (7)	Kia Center; 19,441	57–22
80	April 8	Milwaukee	W 137–111	Jalen Duren (21)	Jalen Duren (9)	Cade Cunningham (10)	Little Caesars Arena; 19,997	58–22
81	April 10	@ Charlotte	W 118–100	Jalen Duren (20)	Jalen Duren (9)	Cade Cunningham (7)	Spectrum Center; 19,623	59–22
82	April 12	@ Indiana	W 133–121	Paul Reed (26)	Cade Cunningham (8)	Cade Cunningham (14)	Gainbridge Fieldhouse; 16,840	60–22

2025–26 season schedule

=== Playoffs ===
2026 playoff game log
Total: 7–7 (home: 5–3; road: 2–4)
First Round: 4–3 (home: 3–1; road: 1–2)

Game	Date	Team	Score	High points	High rebounds	High assists	Location Attendance	Series
1	April 19	Orlando	L 101–112	Cade Cunningham (39)	Duren, Thompson (7)	Cunningham, Robinson (4)	Little Caesars Arena; 20,062	0–1
2	April 22	Orlando	W 98–83	Cade Cunningham (27)	Tobias Harris (11)	Cade Cunningham (11)	Little Caesars Arena; 20,062	1–1
3	April 25	@ Orlando	L 105–113	Cade Cunningham (27)	Jalen Duren (9)	Cade Cunningham (9)	Kia Center; 18,846	1–2
4	April 27	@ Orlando	L 88–94	Cade Cunningham (25)	Cunningham, Thompson (9)	Cade Cunningham (6)	Kia Center; 19,040	1–3
5	April 29	Orlando	W 116–109	Cade Cunningham (45)	Ausar Thompson (15)	Ausar Thompson (6)	Little Caesars Arena; 20,062	2–3
6	May 1	@ Orlando	W 93–79	Cade Cunningham (32)	Tied (10)	Ausar Thompson (6)	Kia Center; 19,205	3–3
7	May 3	Orlando	W 116–94	Cade Cunningham (32)	Jalen Duren (15)	Cade Cunningham (12)	Little Caesars Arena; 20,062	4–3

Conference Semifinals: 3–4 (home: 2–2; road: 1–2)

Game	Date	Team	Score	High points	High rebounds	High assists	Location Attendance	Series
1	May 5	Cleveland	W 111–101	Cade Cunningham (23)	Jalen Duren (12)	Cade Cunningham (7)	Little Caesars Arena; 20,062	1–0
2	May 7	Cleveland	W 107–97	Cade Cunningham (25)	Jalen Duren (10)	Cade Cunningham (10)	Little Caesars Arena; 20,062	2–0
3	May 9	@ Cleveland	L 109–116	Cade Cunningham (27)	Cade Cunningham (10)	Cade Cunningham (10)	Rocket Arena; 19,432	2–1
4	May 11	@ Cleveland	L 103–112	Caris LeVert (24)	Tobias Harris (8)	Cade Cunningham (6)	Rocket Arena; 19,432	2–2
5	May 13	Cleveland	L 113–117 (OT)	Cade Cunningham (39)	Paul Reed (8)	Cade Cunningham (9)	Little Caesars Arena; 20,062	2–3
6	May 16	@ Cleveland	W 115–94	Cade Cunningham (21)	Jalen Duren (11)	Cade Cunningham (8)	Rocket Arena; 19,432	3–3
7	May 19	Cleveland	L 94–125	Daniss Jenkins (17)	Jalen Duren (9)	Cunningham, Jenkins (5)	Little Caesars Arena; 20,062	3–4

2026 playoff schedule

=== NBA Cup ===
==== East Group B ====
Pos	Team	Pld	W	L	PF	PA	PD	Qualification
1	Orlando Magic	4	4	0	484	420	+64	Advanced to knockout rounds
2	Boston Celtics	4	2	2	441	458	−17	
3	Detroit Pistons	4	2	2	462	441	+21	
4	Philadelphia 76ers	4	1	3	431	470	−39	
5	Brooklyn Nets	4	1	3	421	450	−29	

Source: NBA

== Player statistics ==
Legend
GP	Games played	GS	Games started	MPG	Minutes per game
FG%	Field-goal percentage	3P%	3-point field-goal percentage	FT%	Free-throw percentage
RPG	Rebounds per game	APG	Assists per game	SPG	Steals per game
BPG	Blocks per game	PPG	Points per game

=== Regular season ===
Detroit Pistons statistics
Player	GP	GS	MPG	FG%	3P%	FT%	RPG	APG	SPG	BPG	PPG
Cade Cunningham	64	64	33.9	.461	.342	.814	5.5	9.9	1.4	.8	23.9
Jalen Duren	70	70	28.2	.650		.747	10.5	2.0	.8	.9	19.5
Javonte Green	82	6	17.6	.447	.381	.840	2.8	.7	1.2	.3	6.9
Tobias Harris	63	63	27.7	.469	.368	.866	5.1	2.5	.9	.4	13.3
Ron Holland	78	5	19.9	.432	.253	.805	4.0	1.2	1.2	.3	8.2
Kevin Huerter^{†}	25	3	20.5	.443	.294	.933	2.8	2.5	1.1	.3	8.6
Jaden Ivey^{†}	33	2	16.8	.450	.372	.789	2.2	1.6	.5	.4	8.2
Daniss Jenkins	72	19	20.2	.408	.374	.832	2.3	3.9	.9	.2	9.3
Colby Jones	1	0	7.0	.333	.000		4.0	2.0	.0	.0	2.0
Isaac Jones^{†}	4	0	4.8	.400	.000	1.000	.8	.0	.0	.3	1.5
Bobi Klintman	12	0	5.9	.333	.308	.000	1.6	.5	.3	.0	1.8
Chaz Lanier	34	0	7.7	.315	.284	.833	.7	.5	.2	.0	2.4
Caris LeVert	60	0	19.2	.417	.333	.679	2.0	2.7	.9	.7	7.4
Wendell Moore Jr.	6	0	10.0	.571	.000	1.000	1.0	.7	.3	.3	1.7
Paul Reed	65	11	13.9	.617	.325	.664	4.5	1.2	.9	.9	7.8
Duncan Robinson	77	77	27.4	.456	.410	.755	2.7	2.1	.6	.3	12.2
Marcus Sasser	38	5	12.0	.390	.415	.833	1.0	2.0	.5	.1	5.2
Tolu Smith	15	0	9.1	.500		.667	3.3	.9	.1	.4	3.7
Isaiah Stewart	58	13	22.7	.550	.333	.756	5.0	1.1	.3	1.6	10.0
Ausar Thompson	73	72	26.0	.525	.250	.571	5.7	3.1	2.0	.9	9.9

=== Playoffs ===
Detroit Pistons statistics
Player	GP	GS	MPG	FG%	3P%	FT%	RPG	APG	SPG	BPG	PPG
Cade Cunningham	14	14	40.9	.432	.402	.861	5.1	7.5	1.1	.6	28.1
Jalen Duren	14	14	30.1	.514		.674	8.5	2.1	.6	1.2	10.2
Javonte Green	11	0	12.0	.300	.259	.833	1.8	.3	.5	.5	2.7
Tobias Harris	14	14	34.6	.425	.292	.825	7.2	1.6	1.5	.8	18.1
Ron Holland	9	0	6.4	.308	.250	.600	1.6	.1	.4	.2	1.4
Kevin Huerter	5	0	9.2	.286	.400		1.0	1.4	.4	.0	1.2
Daniss Jenkins	14	3	22.7	.361	.271	.774	2.6	3.0	.4	.4	9.1
Chaz Lanier	3	0	2.7	.333	.000		.0	.3	.0	.0	.7
Caris LeVert	13	0	16.6	.446	.370	.900	2.2	1.2	.6	.5	5.9
Paul Reed	9	0	9.6	.667	.400	.750	4.0	.6	.1	.7	7.4
Duncan Robinson	13	11	29.5	.447	.456	.611	2.4	2.3	1.3	.2	11.8
Marcus Sasser	6	0	10.2	.478	.357		.8	.5	.5	.0	4.5
Tolu Smith	3	0	2.3	1.000			.7	.0	.3	.0	1.3
Isaiah Stewart	14	0	11.8	.588	.500	.706	2.4	.2	.1	1.0	4.0
Ausar Thompson	14	14	30.5	.505	.143	.516	7.9	3.1	2.0	1.8	8.2

- ^{†} Denotes player spent time with another team in the season. Stats reflect time with the Pistons only.

== Transactions ==
=== Overview ===
Players Added

Via draft

- Chaz Lanier

Via trade

- Kevin Huerter
- Duncan Robinson
- Dario Šarić

Via free agency

- Javonte Green
- Colby Jones
- Isaac Jones
- Caris LeVert
- Wendell Moore Jr.
Players Lost

Via trade

- Simone Fontecchio
- Jaden Ivey
- Dennis Schröder

Via free agency

- Malik Beasley
- Tim Hardaway Jr.
- Lindy Waters III

Waived

- Ron Harper Jr.
- Colby Jones
- Isaac Jones
- Bobi Klintman
- Dario Šarić

=== Trades ===
July 7, 2025	To Detroit Pistons Duncan Robinson	To Miami Heat Simone Fontecchio
July 7, 2025	To Detroit Pistons 2026 second-round pick	To Sacramento Kings Dennis Schröder; 2029 second-round pick
February 3, 2026	Three-team trade
February 3, 2026	To Chicago Bulls Mike Conley Jr. (from Minnesota) Jaden Ivey (from Detroit)	To Minnesota Timberwolves Cash considerations
February 3, 2026	To Detroit Pistons Kevin Huerter (from Chicago) Dario Šarić (from Chicago) 2026 first-round protected pick swap (from Minnesota)

=== Free agency ===
==== Re-signed ====
Date	Player	Ref.
July 7	Paul Reed	
August 2	Daniss Jenkins	

==== Additions ====
Date	Player	Former Team	Ref.
July 8	Caris LeVert	Atlanta Hawks	
July 29	Colby Jones	Washington Wizards	
August 15	Javonte Green	Cleveland Cavaliers	
November 6	Isaac Jones	Sacramento Kings	
November 10	Wendell Moore Jr.	Maine Celtics	

==== Subtractions ====
Date	Player	Reason	New Team	Ref.
July 10	Tim Hardaway Jr.	Unrestricted free agent	Denver Nuggets	
July 24	Ron Harper Jr.	Waived	Boston Celtics	
July 24	Lindy Waters III	Unrestricted free agent	San Antonio Spurs	
November 10	Colby Jones	Waived	Motor City Cruise	
February 4	Isaac Jones	Waived	—N/a	
February 9	Dario Šarić	Waived	—N/a	
February 13	Malik Beasley	Unrestricted free agent	(Puerto Rico) Cangrejeros de Santurce	
April 7	Bobi Klintman	Waived	—N/a	
