= Paul Reed (basketball) =

American basketball player (born 1999)

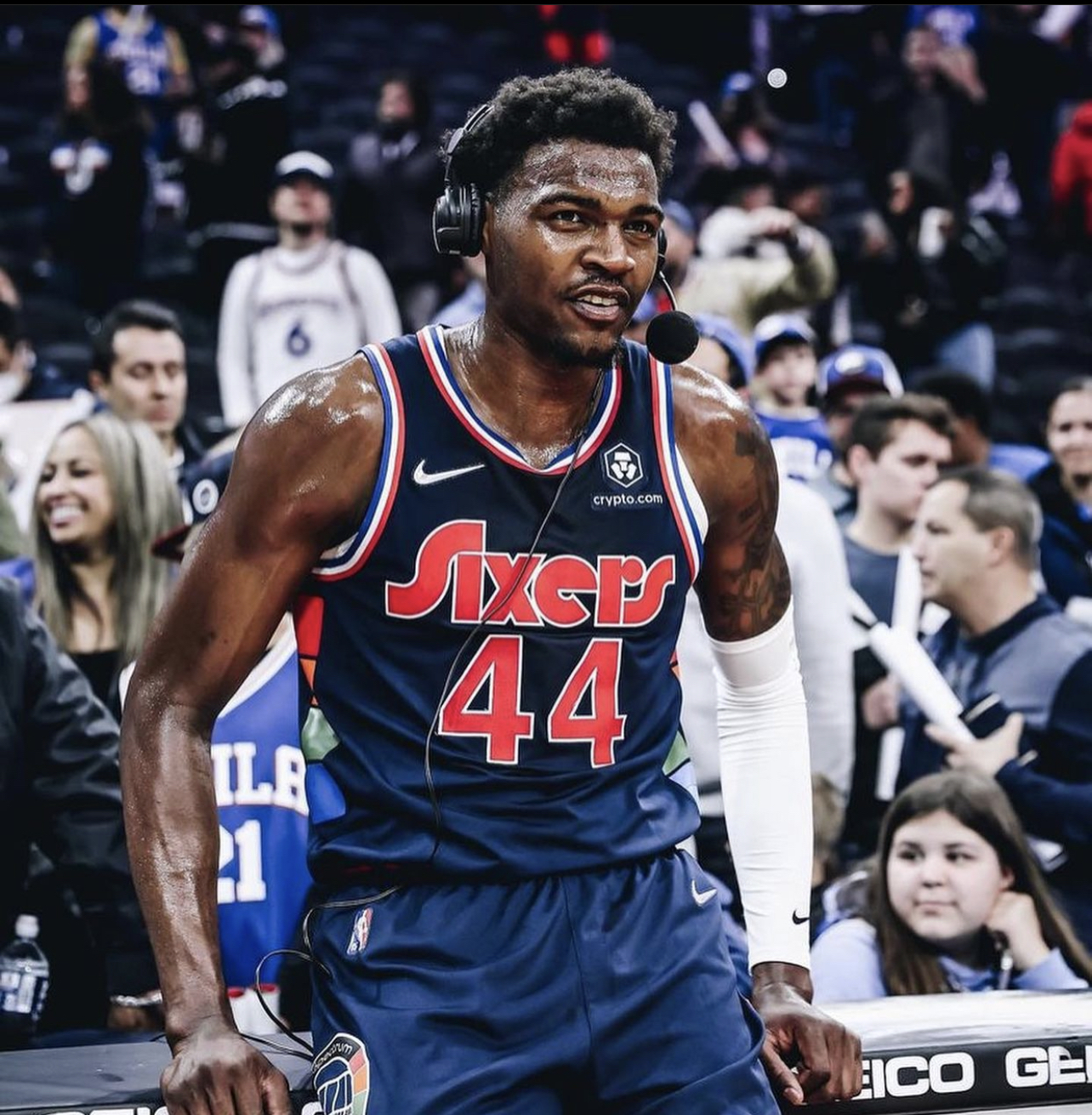
- Reed with the Philadelphia 76ers in 2022

No. 7 – Detroit Pistons
- Position: Power forward
- League: NBA

Personal information
- Born: June 14, 1999 (age 27) Orlando, Florida, U.S.
- Listed height: 6 ft 9 in (2.06 m)
- Listed weight: 210 lb (95 kg)

Career information
- High school: Wekiva (Apopka, Florida)
- College: DePaul (2017–2020)
- NBA draft: 2020: 2nd round, 58th overall pick
- Drafted by: Philadelphia 76ers
- Playing career: 2020–present

Career history
- 2020–2024: Philadelphia 76ers
- 2021–2022: →Delaware Blue Coats
- 2024–present: Detroit Pistons

Career highlights
- NBA G League MVP (2021); NBA G League Rookie of the Year (2021); All-NBA G League First Team (2021); NBA G League All-Defensive Team (2021); NBA G League All-Rookie Team (2021); Second-team All-Big East (2020); Big East Most Improved Player (2019)
- Stats at NBA.com
- Stats at Basketball Reference

Paul Reed (born June 14, 1999), nicknamed "BBall Paul", is an American professional basketball player for the Detroit Pistons of the National Basketball Association (NBA). He played college basketball for the DePaul Blue Demons. He was drafted by the Philadelphia 76ers with the 58th pick in the 2020 NBA draft.

== Early life ==
Reed grew up in Orlando, Florida, and attended Wekiva High School. Reed grew from being 6'2" as a freshman in high school to 6'6" as a junior and was 6'8" by the start of his senior year. As a senior, he averaged 18.2 points and 11.4 rebounds and was named the Central Florida Player of the Year as he led the Mustangs to the state championship game. Rated a three-star recruit and the No. 235 prospect in his class, Reed committed to play college basketball at DePaul over offers from Clemson, Kansas State, Rutgers and Murray State.

== College career ==
As a true freshman, Reed averaged 3.6 points, and 3.1 rebounds in 28 games played off the bench. He received more playing time towards the end of the season and averaged 5.6 points and 4.6 rebounds over the final 14 games of the season. As a sophomore, Reed averaged 12.3 points and a Big East Conference-leading 8.5 rebounds per game and was named the Big East Conference Most Improved Player. In the 2019 College Basketball Invitational Reed averaged 18.3 points, 10.3 rebounds, 2.7 blocks, and 2.2 steals as he helped lead the Blue Demons to the best-of-three final.

Reed entered his junior season as a preseason All-Big East selection. Reed recorded ten double-doubles and was named to the Big East Weekly Honor Roll four times during DePaul's 13-game non-conference schedule at the start of the season. Reed scored 23 points on 8-of-9 shooting with nine rebounds in DePaul's 79–66 upset of No. 5 Butler on January 18. Reed missed several games in February and March with a hip pointer injury. After the regular season, Reed was named Second Team All-Big East after averaging 15.1 points and finishing second in the conference in rebounds (10.7), blocks (2.6) and steals (1.9). He had 18 double-doubles for the season. After the season, Reed declared for the 2020 NBA draft, forgoing his final season of eligibility.

== Professional career ==
=== Philadelphia 76ers (2020–2024) ===
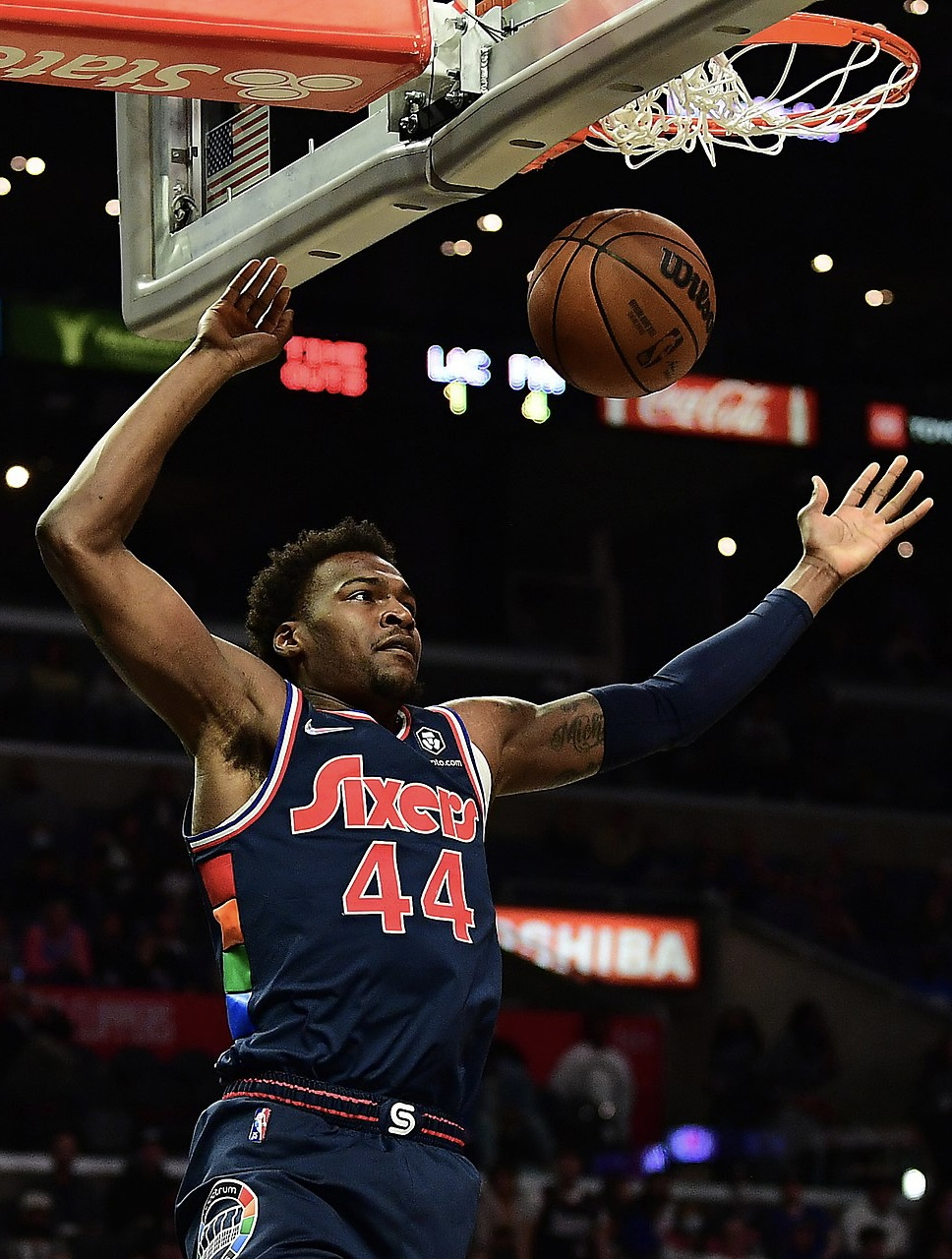
Reed with the Philadelphia 76ers in 2022

Reed was drafted in the second round with 58th overall selection in the 2020 NBA draft by the Philadelphia 76ers. On December 3, he signed with the 76ers on a two-way contract, meaning he would split time between the 76ers and their G League affiliate, the Delaware Blue Coats. Reed made his NBA debut on January 4, 2021, playing the final 90 seconds of the game and scoring two points on his sole field goal attempt in a 118–101 win over the Charlotte Hornets. Paul played with the Blue Coats during the shortened single-site G League season in 2021, where he won the league's Most Valuable Player and Rookie of the Year awards.

On March 26, 2021, the 76ers announced that they had converted Reed to a standard NBA contract.

On November 27, 2022, Reed grabbed 13 rebounds and scored 12 points during a win over the Orlando Magic.

On May 2, 2023, Reed sank four clutch free throws, leading the Philadelphia 76ers to win Game 1 of the Eastern Conference Semi-finals against the Boston Celtics.

On July 8, 2023, Reed signed the Utah Jazz’s three-year, $23 million offer sheet. The Philadelphia 76ers matched that offer sheet the next day.

On January 27, 2024, Reed posted a career-high 30 points, along with 13 rebounds in a 111–105 loss to the Denver Nuggets.

On July 6, 2024, Reed was waived by the 76ers.

=== Detroit Pistons (2024–present) ===
On July 9, 2024, the Detroit Pistons claimed Reed off waivers, but waived him on December 14. The next day, Reed re-signed with the Pistons.

On December 19, 2024, Reed started an altercation with Jordan Clarkson, and was fined $15,000 on December 21.

On June 30, 2025, Reed agreed to a two-year, $11 million contract to return to the Pistons.

== Career statistics ==
Legend
GP	Games played	GS	Games started	MPG	Minutes per game
FG%	Field goal percentage	3P%	3-point field goal percentage	FT%	Free throw percentage
RPG	Rebounds per game	APG	Assists per game	SPG	Steals per game
BPG	Blocks per game	PPG	Points per game	**Bold**	Career high

=== NBA ===
==== Regular season ====
Year	Team	GP	GS	MPG	FG%	3P%	FT%	RPG	APG	SPG	BPG	PPG
2020–21	Philadelphia	26	0	6.8	.538	.000	.500	2.3	.5	.4	.5	3.4
2021–22	Philadelphia	38	2	8.0	.563	.250	.429	2.4	.4	**.9**	.4	3.1
2022–23	Philadelphia	69	2	10.9	.593	.167	.745	3.8	.4	.7	.7	4.2
2023–24	Philadelphia	**82**	**24**	**19.4**	.540	**.368**	.718	**6.0**	**1.3**	.8	**1.0**	7.3
2024–25	Detroit	45	0	9.7	.507	.286	**.762**	2.7	1.0	**.9**	.6	4.1
2025–26	Detroit	65	11	13.9	**.617**	.325	.664	4.5	1.2	**.9**	.9	**7.8**
Career		325	39	12.8	.565	.310	.690	4.1	.9	.8	.8	5.5

==== Playoffs ====
Year	Team	GP	GS	MPG	FG%	3P%	FT%	RPG	APG	SPG	BPG	PPG
2021	Philadelphia	3	0	3.5	.500	—	—	2.7	.0	.0	.3	1.3
2022	Philadelphia	**12**	0	11.6	.528	**.667**	.571	3.8	**.8**	.8	.5	3.7
2023	Philadelphia	11	**2**	**14.3**	.579	—	**1.000**	**5.5**	.6	.5	.4	4.6
2024	Philadelphia	6	0	7.2	.444	—	.500	2.7	.3	.2	.5	1.5
2025	Detroit	5	0	10.6	.625	—	.667	3.0	.2	**1.0**	.6	2.8
2026	Detroit	9	0	9.6	**.667**	.400	.750	4.0	.6	.1	**.7**	**7.4**
Career		46	2	10.7	.584	.500	.735	3.9	.5	.5	.5	4.1

=== College ===
Year	Team	GP	GS	MPG	FG%	3P%	FT%	RPG	APG	SPG	BPG	PPG
2017–18	DePaul	28	1	9.9	.518	.214	.579	3.1	.4	.5	.5	3.6
2018–19	DePaul	**36**	28	26.9	**.562**	**.405**	**.770**	8.5	.9	1.1	1.5	12.3
2019–20	DePaul	29	**29**	**31.7**	.516	.308	.738	**10.7**	**1.6**	**1.9**	**2.6**	**15.1**
Career		93	58	23.2	.535	.330	.739	7.5	1.0	1.2	1.5	10.6

== Personal life ==
Reed's father, Paul, played college basketball at Old Dominion and UCF, then played professional basketball in Europe. He has four sisters. His uncle, Mike Sims-Walker, played in the National Football League (NFL).

Outside of basketball, Reed is known on social media to sell his "Out the Mud" labelled hoodies. 'Out the Mud' calls back to a tweet Paul posted when he did not receive any playing time in a game, referencing the Lil Baby and Future song of the same name.
