= Alondes Williams =

American basketball player (born 1999)

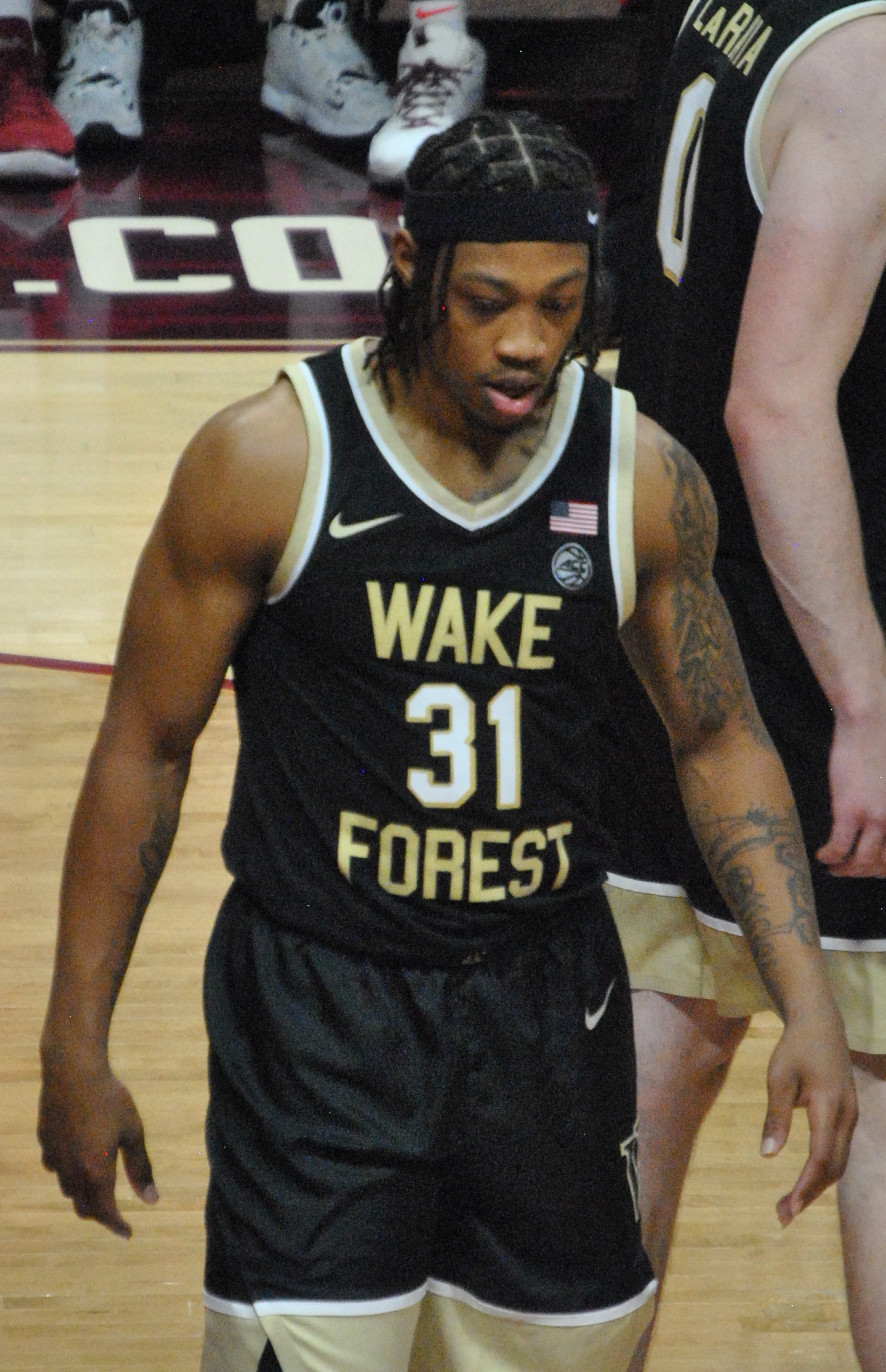
- Williams with Wake Forest in 2021

No. 31 – Capital City Go-Go
- Position: Point guard / shooting guard
- League: NBA G League

Personal information
- Born: June 19, 1999 (age 27) Milwaukee, Wisconsin, U.S.
- Listed height: 6 ft 4 in (1.93 m)
- Listed weight: 210 lb (95 kg)

Career information
- High school: Riverside (Milwaukee, Wisconsin)
- College: Triton (2017–2019); Oklahoma (2019–2021); Wake Forest (2021–2022)
- NBA draft: 2022: undrafted
- Playing career: 2022–present

Career history
- 2022–2023: Brooklyn Nets
- 2022–2023: →Long Island Nets
- 2023: Long Island Nets
- 2023–2024: Sioux Falls Skyforce
- 2024: Miami Heat
- 2024: →Sioux Falls Skyforce
- 2024–2025: Detroit Pistons
- 2024–2025: →Motor City Cruise
- 2025: Sioux Falls Skyforce
- 2025–2026: Capital City Go-Go
- 2026: Washington Wizards
- 2026: Beijing Ducks
- 2026–present: Capital City Go-Go

Career highlights
- NBA G League Most Improved Player (2024); All-NBA G League First Team (2024); NBA G League Next Up Game (2024); ACC Player of the Year (2022); First-team All-ACC (2022); N4C Player of the Year (2019); 2× First-team All-N4C (2018, 2019)
- Stats at NBA.com
- Stats at Basketball Reference

Alondes Louis Williams (born June 19, 1999) is an American professional basketball player for the Capital City Go-Go of the NBA G League. He played college basketball for the Triton Trojans, Oklahoma Sooners, and Wake Forest Demon Deacons.

== High school career ==
Williams played basketball for Riverside University High School in Milwaukee, Wisconsin, where he was coached by Tyrone Lewis. Williams averaged 12.3 points per game as a senior.

== College career ==
As a freshman at Triton College, Williams averaged 13.8 points and 6.3 rebounds per game, earning First Team All-North Central Community College Conference (N4C) accolades. His team won the National Junior College Athletic Association (NJCAA) Division II title before moving to the NJCAA Division I in the following year. In his sophomore season, Williams averaged 17 points, 7.7 rebounds and 5.3 assists per game, and was named N4C Player of the Year. He transferred to Oklahoma for his junior season, and averaged six points and 1.9 rebounds per game. As a senior, Williams averaged 6.7 points and 2.8 rebounds per game. He opted to use an additional year of eligibility and transferred to Wake Forest. On December 11, 2021, Williams posted the second triple-double in program history, with 16 points, 14 rebounds and 10 assists in a 79–53 win against USC Upstate. In his next game, three days later, he scored a career-high 36 points in a 77–70 victory over VMI. Williams was named ACC Player of the Year.

== Professional career ==
=== Brooklyn / Long Island Nets (2022–2023) ===
After being undrafted in the 2022 NBA draft, Williams signed a two-way contract with the Brooklyn Nets on July 4, 2022, but was waived on January 12, 2023, after appearing in just one regular-season game. Six days later, Williams was reacquired by the Long Island Nets.

=== Miami Heat / Sioux Falls Skyforce (2023–2024) ===
On July 24, 2023, Williams signed with the Miami Heat, but was waived on October 14 and sixteen days later, he joined the Sioux Falls Skyforce. On February 9, 2024, he signed a two-way contract with the Heat and on April 5, he was named the NBA G League Most Improved Player after averaging 20.3 points on 49.8 percent from the field, 5.3 rebounds. 7.1 assists, 1.3 steals and 0.6 blocks per 37.4 minutes a game in 43 appearances.

On September 30, 2024, Williams signed an Exhibit 10 contract with the Los Angeles Clippers, but was waived on October 19.

=== Detroit Pistons / Motor City Cruise (2024–2025) ===
On October 22, 2024, Williams signed a two-way contract with the Detroit Pistons. However, he was waived on January 6, 2025.

=== Return to Sioux Falls (2025) ===
On January 12, 2025, Williams returned to the Sioux Falls Skyforce.

=== Washington Wizards / Capital City Go-Go (2025–2026) ===
On October 13, 2025, Williams signed an Exhibit 10 contract with the Washington Wizards. On February 16, 2026, he signed a 10-day contract with the Wizards. On February 20, Williams recorded a career-high 25 points and 10 rebounds in a 131-118 victory over the Indiana Pacers.

In July 2026, Williams joined the Boston Celtics for the 2026 NBA Summer League.

== Career statistics ==
Legend
GP	Games played	GS	Games started	MPG	Minutes per game
FG%	Field goal percentage	3P%	3-point field goal percentage	FT%	Free throw percentage
RPG	Rebounds per game	APG	Assists per game	SPG	Steals per game
BPG	Blocks per game	PPG	Points per game	**Bold**	Career high

=== NBA ===
==== Regular season ====
Year	Team	GP	GS	MPG	FG%	3P%	FT%	RPG	APG	SPG	BPG	PPG
2022–23	Brooklyn	1	0	5.3	—	—	—	1.0	.0	.0	.0	.0
2023–24	Miami	**7**	0	2.2	.250	.000	**1.000**	.1	.0	.0	.1	.7
2024–25	Detroit	1	0	3.7	**1.000**	**1.000**	—	.0	1.0	.0	.0	5.0
2025–26	Washington	4	0	**25.3**	.615	.357	.875	**6.3**	**3.0**	**.8**	**.8**	**11.0**
Career		13	0	9.7	.556	.316	.889	2.1	1.0	.2	.3	4.2

=== College ===
==== NCAA Division I ====
Year	Team	GP	GS	MPG	FG%	3P%	FT%	RPG	APG	SPG	BPG	PPG
2019–20	Oklahoma	31	10	16.6	.438	**.283**	.636	1.9	.6	.4	.1	6.0
2020–21	Oklahoma	24	14	18.5	.481	.167	**.839**	2.8	1.3	.7	.3	6.7
2021–22	Wake Forest	**35**	**35**	**34.1**	**.507**	.282	.691	**6.4**	**5.2**	**1.2**	**.4**	**18.5**
Career		90	59	23.9	.488	.270	.699	3.9	2.6	.8	.2	11.1

==== NJCAA ====
Year	Team	GP	GS	MPG	FG%	3P%	FT%	RPG	APG	SPG	BPG	PPG
2017–18	Triton	**36**	—	—	**.577**	.376	—	6.3	2.7	—	—	13.8
2018–19	Triton	33	**32**	**21.7**	.504	**.404**	**.701**	**7.7**	**5.3**	**1.8**	**1.0**	**17.0**
Career		69	—	—	—	—	—	—	—	—	—	—
