= 2020–21 NBA G League season =

- League: NBA G League
- Sport: Basketball
- Duration: February 9 – March 11, 2021
- Number of teams: 18

Draft
- Top draft pick: Admiral Schofield
- Picked by: Greensboro Swarm

Regular season
- Top seed: Raptors 905
- Season MVP: Paul Reed (Delaware)
- Finals champions: Lakeland Magic
- Runners-up: Delaware Blue Coats
- Finals MVP: Devin Cannady (Lakeland)

NBA G League seasons
- ← 2019–20 2021–22 →

The 2020–21 NBA G League season was the 20th season of the NBA G League, the official minor league basketball organization owned by the National Basketball Association (NBA). The season was indefinitely postponed following the previous season's cessation amid the COVID-19 pandemic. The league used the same type of isolation season as the 2020 NBA Bubble with all games at ESPN Wide World of Sports Complex in Bay Lake, Florida. Only 17 of the 28 teams from the previous season, plus the new NBA G League Ignite development team, chose to participate.

== League changes ==
In December 2019, NBA commissioner Adam Silver announced that the Capitanes de la Ciudad de México of the Liga Nacional de Baloncesto Profesional would be joining the G League in the 2020–21 season on a five-year agreement. The 2019–20 season was then curtailed by the restrictions of the COVID-19 pandemic and all remaining games after March 12, 2020, and the playoffs were cancelled.

On July 9, 2020, the Phoenix Suns announced they were relocating their G League franchise, the Northern Arizona Suns, from the Prescott Valley to the Phoenix area for the 2020–21 season and subsequently sold the franchise to the Detroit Pistons. The Pistons plan to move the team to Detroit in the 2021–22 season under the name Motor City Cruise. The New Orleans Pelicans launched a name-the-team contest for their upcoming team in Birmingham.

During the constantly changing restrictions amid the pandemic, no announcements for the 2020–21 season were made by the league or the NBA. The NBA season began in December 2020. It was rumored that all games for the G League season would take place in a bubble similar to the 2020 NBA Bubble in either Atlanta, Georgia, or outside Orlando, Florida, with several teams likely to opt out, but that the NBA G League Ignite prospects team would be joining. The bubble season was confirmed by the league on January 8, 2021, to start in February at ESPN Wide World of Sports Complex at Walt Disney World in Bay Lake, Florida. Eleven teams opted out of the season: the Capital City Go-Go, College Park Skyhawks, Grand Rapids Drive, Maine Red Claws, Northern Arizona Suns, Sioux Falls SkyForce, South Bay Lakers, Stockton Kings, Texas Legends, Windy City Bulls, and Wisconsin Herd. The Capitanes de la Ciudad de México also announced they would postpone their first season in the league until 2021–22.

The schedule was announced on January 27 with the 18 teams each playing 15 regular season games between February 9 and March 6. There is no conference or divisional alignment in the bubble and the top eight teams play a single-elimination playoff from March 8 through the championship game on March 11.

== Regular season ==
Pos	Team	W	L	PCT	GB
1	y – Raptors 905 (TOR)	12	3	.800	—
2	x – Santa Cruz Warriors (GSW)	11	4	.733	1
3	x – Erie BayHawks (NO)	11	4	.733	1
4	x – Delaware Blue Coats (PHI)	10	5	.667	2
5	x – Austin Spurs (SAS)	10	5	.667	2
6	x – Lakeland Magic (ORL)	9	6	.600	3
7	x – Rio Grande Valley Vipers (HOU)	9	6	.600	3
8	x – NBA G League Ignite	8	7	.533	4
9	Oklahoma City Blue (OKC)	8	7	.533	4
10	Long Island Nets (BKN)	7	8	.467	5
11	Westchester Knicks (NYK)	7	8	.467	5
12	Memphis Hustle (MEM)	6	9	.400	6
13	Fort Wayne Mad Ants (IND)	6	9	.400	6
14	Canton Charge (CLE)	5	10	.333	7
15	Greensboro Swarm (CHA)	5	10	.333	7
16	Agua Caliente Clippers (LAC)	5	10	.333	7
17	Salt Lake City Stars (UTA)	4	11	.267	8
18	Iowa Wolves (MIN)	2	13	.133	10

Source: GLeague.NBA.com
x – Qualified for playoffs; y – Clinched top seed

== Playoffs ==
For the first time since the 2006–07 NBA Development League season, the playoffs were held entirely as a single-elimination bracket (the league held this type of format from 2003 to 2007, albeit with four teams for the first three seasons and six for the last season). The Lakeland Magic became the lowest seeded team to win a G League championship.

Quarterfinals; March 8
1	Raptors 905	127
8	Ignite	102
4	Delaware Blue Coats	124
5	Austin Spurs	103
2	Santa Cruz Warriors	110
7	Rio Grande Valley Vipers	81
3	Erie BayHawks	110
6	Lakeland Magic	139

Semifinals; March 9
1	Raptors 905	100
4	Delaware Blue Coats	127
2	Santa Cruz Warriors	96
6	Lakeland Magic	108

Championship; March 11
4	Delaware Blue Coats	78
6	Lakeland Magic	97

=== Championship boxscore ===
March 11, 2021
4:30 p.m. ET

Boxscore

Lakeland Magic 97, Delaware Blue Coats 78
Scoring by quarter: 21–11, 25–23, 31–20, 20–24
Pts: Devin Cannady 22; Rebs: Karim Mane 8 Asts: Jeff Dowtin Jr. 7	Pts: Rayjon Tucker 20; Rebs: Paul Reed 11; Asts: Justin Robinson 5

AdventHealth Arena, Orlando, Florida
Attendance: Game was behind closed doors
Referees:
- #18 Isaac Barnett
- #55 Cheryl Flores
- #80 Jamahl Ralls
- #36 Tyler Ricks

== Awards ==
=== Player of the Week ===
Date	Player	Ref
February 16, 2021	Paul Reed	
February 22, 2021	Moses Brown	
March 1, 2021	Kevin Porter Jr.	
March 8, 2021	Henry Ellenson	

== Notable occurrences ==
- On July 9, 2020, Tori Miller became the first female general manager (GM) in the NBA G League when she was promoted to the position by the College Park Skyhawks.
- On January 15, 2021, Amber Nichols became the second female general manager in the NBA G League when she was promoted to the position by the Capital City Go-Go.
