= Ron Harper Jr. =

American basketball player (born 2000)

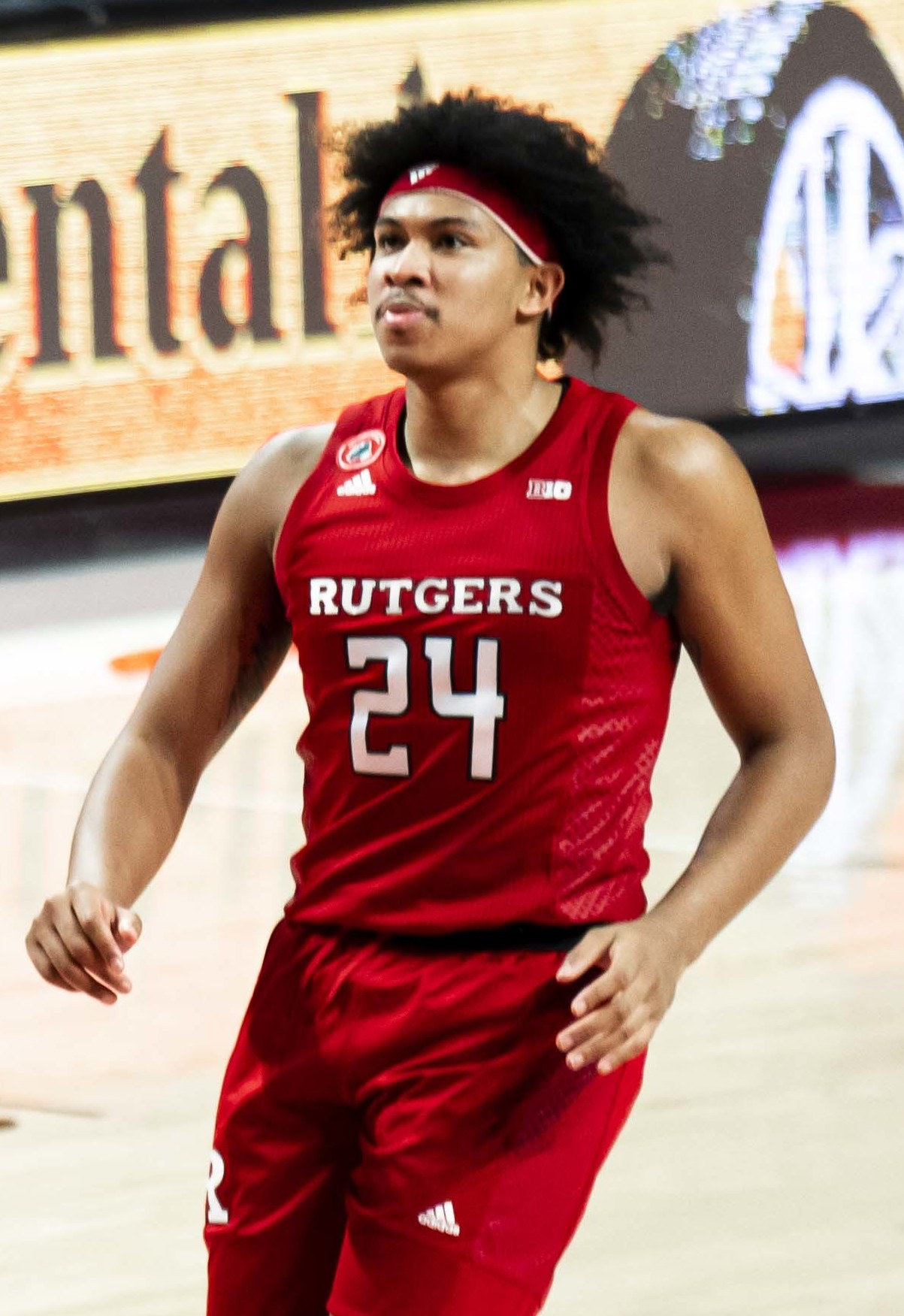
- Harper with Rutgers in 2020

No. 8 – Boston Celtics
- Position: Small forward / shooting guard
- League: NBA

Personal information
- Born: April 12, 2000 (age 26) Paterson, New Jersey, U.S.
- Listed height: 6 ft 5 in (1.96 m)
- Listed weight: 231 lb (105 kg)

Career information
- High school: Don Bosco Prep (Ramsey, New Jersey)
- College: Rutgers (2018–2022)
- NBA draft: 2022: undrafted
- Playing career: 2022–present

Career history
- 2022–2023: Toronto Raptors
- 2022–2023: → Raptors 905
- 2024–2025: Maine Celtics
- 2025: Detroit Pistons
- 2025: → Motor City Cruise
- 2025–present: Boston Celtics
- 2025–2026: → Maine Celtics

Career highlights
- All-NBA G League Third Team (2026); Honorable mention All-American – AP (2022); Second-team All-Big Ten (2022); Third-team All-Big Ten (2021); Haggerty Award (2022)
- Stats at NBA.com
- Stats at Basketball Reference

Ronald Harper Jr. (born April 12, 2000) is an American professional basketball player for the Boston Celtics of the National Basketball Association (NBA). He played college basketball for the Rutgers Scarlet Knights of the Big Ten Conference. He is the son of former NBA player Ron Harper and the older brother of San Antonio Spurs player Dylan Harper.

== Early life and high school career ==
Harper was born in Paterson, New Jersey, while his father, Ron Harper, was playing for the Los Angeles Lakers in the NBA. He began playing basketball under the coaching of his mother, Maria. On the Amateur Athletic Union circuit, he played for Ring City Basketball, a program operated by his parents. He was raised in Upper Saddle River and Franklin Lakes, New Jersey, and attended Don Bosco Preparatory High School in Ramsey, New Jersey.

As a junior, Harper averaged 10.1 points per game and helped Don Bosco win its first NJSIAA Non-Public A state championship in 47 years. During his senior season, he averaged 20.8 points and led the Ironmen to a 29–3 record, a second consecutive Non-Public A title and the Bergen County Jamboree championship. He was named North Jersey Player of the Year by The Record.

Harper was rated a four-star recruit by Rivals. He committed to Rutgers on August 11, 2017, choosing the Scarlet Knights over reported offers that included Nebraska and Miami (Ohio).

== College career ==
Harper appeared in all 31 games as a freshman at Rutgers, averaging 7.8 points and 3.1 rebounds per game. As a sophomore, he started every game and led the team in scoring at 12.1 points per game while averaging 5.8 rebounds. He was named honorable mention All-Big Ten and second-team All-Met.

As a junior, Harper averaged 14.9 points and 5.9 rebounds and earned third-team All-Big Ten and first-team All-Met honors. He helped Rutgers qualify for its first NCAA tournament since 1991. Rutgers defeated Clemson in the first round for the program's first NCAA tournament victory since 1983. Following the season, Harper entered the 2021 NBA draft process before withdrawing and returning to Rutgers.

On December 9, 2021, Harper recorded 30 points and 10 rebounds against the top-ranked Purdue Boilermakers. He made a shot from just inside halfcourt at the buzzer to give Rutgers a 70–68 victory, its first win over the No. 1-ranked team in program history. As a senior, he averaged 15.8 points, 5.9 rebounds and 1.9 assists per game. Harper was named second-team All-Big Ten, an AP honorable mention All-American and the recipient of the Haggerty Award as the leading Division I men's college basketball player in the New York metropolitan area.

Following Rutgers' loss in the First Four of the 2022 NCAA tournament, Harper announced that he would forgo his remaining collegiate eligibility and enter the 2022 NBA draft. He went undrafted.

== Professional career ==
=== Toronto Raptors and Raptors 905 (2022–2023) ===
On July 14, 2022, Harper signed a two-way contract with the Toronto Raptors and their NBA G League affiliate, Raptors 905. He appeared in nine NBA games during his rookie season. On July 22, 2023, Harper signed another two-way contract with Toronto. The Raptors waived him on December 8 after announcing that he would undergo season-ending shoulder surgery.

=== Maine Celtics (2024–2025) ===
After playing for the Boston Celtics during the 2024 NBA Summer League, Harper signed an Exhibit 10 contract with Boston in July 2024. He was waived on October 17, and joined the Maine Celtics on October 26.

=== Detroit Pistons and Motor City Cruise (2025) ===
On January 6, 2025, Harper signed a two-way contract with the Detroit Pistons, joining their G League affiliate, the Motor City Cruise. On February 1, he made 11 of 18 three-point attempts in a 145–132 victory over the Long Island Nets, setting a Cruise franchise record for three-pointers in a game. Harper appeared in one NBA game for Detroit. The Pistons waived him on July 24.

=== Boston Celtics and Maine Celtics (2025–present) ===
In August 2025, Harper agreed to return to Boston on an Exhibit 10 contract. On October 16, the Celtics converted his contract to a two-way deal.

On February 4, 2026, Harper made his first NBA start and recorded 11 points, nine rebounds and three assists in a 114–93 victory over the Houston Rockets. In 18 games with Maine across the G League Tip-Off Tournament and regular season, all starts, he averaged 25.4 points, 5.1 rebounds, 3.4 assists, 1.3 steals and 1.2 blocks in 31.2 minutes per game. He was selected to participate in the 2026 Rising Stars Challenge and was named to the All-NBA G League Third Team.

On April 4, Boston converted Harper's two-way contract to a standard NBA contract. On April 12, his 26th birthday, he scored a career-high 27 points and added seven rebounds, four assists and three steals in a 113–108 victory over the Orlando Magic.

On April 7, 2026, Harper was named to the All NBA G League Third Team.

Boston declined the team option in Harper's contract for the 2026–27 season before signing him to a new multiyear agreement on July 6. The finalized contract was reported as worth up to $13.7 million over four years. Its first two seasons were fully guaranteed, while the third season was non-guaranteed and the fourth was a non-guaranteed team option.

== Career statistics ==
Legend
GP	Games played	GS	Games started	MPG	Minutes per game
FG%	Field goal percentage	3P%	3-point field goal percentage	FT%	Free throw percentage
RPG	Rebounds per game	APG	Assists per game	SPG	Steals per game
BPG	Blocks per game	PPG	Points per game	**Bold**	Career high

=== NBA ===
==== Regular season ====
Year	Team	GP	GS	MPG	FG%	3P%	FT%	RPG	APG	SPG	BPG	PPG
2022–23	Toronto	9	0	5.3	**.500**	.333	**1.000**	.8	.4	.0	.1	2.2
2023–24	Toronto	1	0	3.7	–	–	–	.0	1.0	.0	.0	.0
2024–25	Detroit	1	0	**17.0**	.125	.000	**1.000**	**7.0**	**2.0**	.0	.0	4.0
2025–26	Boston	**29**	**3**	11.0	.418	**.350**	.750	1.7	.8	**.3**	**.3**	**4.2**
Career		40	3	9.7	.410	.326	.857	1.6	.7	.3	.3	3.7

==== Playoffs ====
Year	Team	GP	GS	MPG	FG%	3P%	FT%	RPG	APG	SPG	BPG	PPG
2026	Boston	6	1	4.2	.444	.500	–	.7	.2	.5	.0	1.8
Career		6	1	4.2	.444	.500	–	.7	.2	.5	.0	1.8

=== College ===
Year	Team	GP	GS	MPG	FG%	3P%	FT%	RPG	APG	SPG	BPG	PPG
2018–19	Rutgers	31	19	22.3	.413	.278	.679	3.1	1.1	.6	.5	7.8
2019–20	Rutgers	31	31	28.1	**.452**	.349	.708	5.8	1.0	.8	**.8**	12.1
2020–21	Rutgers	27	27	32.0	.441	.310	.736	**5.9**	1.6	.7	.6	14.9
2021–22	Rutgers	**32**	**32**	**34.3**	.442	**.398**	**.795**	**5.9**	**1.9**	**1.0**	.6	**15.8**
Career		121	109	29.1	.439	.340	.741	5.1	1.4	.8	.6	12.6

== Personal life ==
Harper's father, Ron Harper, was an All-American college basketball player at Miami (Ohio) and played 15 seasons in the NBA, winning five championships. His mother, Maria (née Pizarro), is of Filipino descent and played college basketball at the University of New Orleans. She later coached the girls' basketball team at DePaul Catholic High School and served as an assistant coach for the boys' team at Don Bosco Prep.

Harper's maternal grandfather, Manuel Pizarro, represented the Philippines in the Basque pelota demonstration event at the 1968 Summer Olympics. Harper has expressed interest in representing the Philippines national team. He attempted to obtain a Philippine passport while in high school, but the application was not completed.

His younger brother, Dylan Harper, played one season at Rutgers before being selected second overall by the San Antonio Spurs in the 2025 NBA draft.
