= 2024–25 Detroit Pistons season =

- Head coach: J. B. Bickerstaff
- President: Trajan Langdon
- General manager: Vacant
- Owner: Tom Gores
- Arena: Little Caesars Arena

Results
- Record: 44–38 (.537)
- Place: Division: 4th (Central); Conference: 6th (Eastern)
- Playoff finish: First round (lost to Knicks 2–4)
- Stats at Basketball Reference

Local media
- Television: FanDuel Sports Network Detroit; WMYD (five simulcasts)
- Radio: WXYT

The 2024–25 Detroit Pistons season was the 84th season of the franchise, the 77th in the National Basketball Association (NBA), and the eighth in Midtown Detroit. This was the Pistons' first season under head coach J. B. Bickerstaff. This was also the Pistons' first season under a new president of basketball operations after finishing the previous season with the worst record in franchise history at 14–68. On January 1, 2025, following a win over the Orlando Magic, the Pistons surpassed the previous season's win total.

On March 28, the Pistons secured their first winning season since 2016. They also became the second team in NBA history to triple their win total from the previous season, joining the 2012–13 Charlotte Bobcats, and the first to do so from the previous full season. On April 4, the Pistons clinched a playoff spot for the first time since 2019 with a 117–105 win over the Toronto Raptors. The Pistons finished the regular season at 44–38, their best record since 2016.

Matching up with the New York Knicks in the first round, the Pistons secured their first playoff win since the 2008 Eastern Conference Finals on April 21, breaking their NBA record 15-game postseason losing streak. The Pistons were ultimately defeated by the Knicks in six games.

The Detroit Pistons drew an average home attendance of 19,071, the 9th-highest of all NBA teams.

== Draft ==
Round	Pick	Player	Position	Nationality	College / team
1	5	Ron Holland II	Small forward	United States	NBA G League Ignite
2	53	Cam Spencer	Shooting guard	United States	UConn

The Pistons held the fifth overall pick in the 2024 NBA draft, along with one second round pick originally owned by the New York Knicks and acquired from the Philadelphia 76ers. They had also traded their original second-round pick to the Los Angeles Clippers before ultimately landing with the Toronto Raptors. The NBA draft lottery was held on May 12, 2024. After finishing with the worst record in the league the previous season, the Pistons had a 14 percent chance of getting the top pick in the draft, and were guaranteed a top-five pick. This was the first NBA draft to be held on multiple nights.

On the first night of the draft, the Pistons selected Ron Holland II from the now-defunct NBA G League Ignite. On the second day of the draft, the Pistons traded for Bobi Klintman, who was selected by the Minnesota Timberwolves with the 37th overall pick.

== Roster ==
2024–25 Detroit Pistons roster
Players

Pos.	No.	Player	Height	Weight	DOB	From
G	5	Malik Beasley	6 ft 4 in (1.93 m)	187 lb (85 kg)	1996-11-26	Florida State
G	2	Cade Cunningham	6 ft 6 in (1.98 m)	220 lb (100 kg)	2001-09-25	Oklahoma State
C	0	Jalen Duren	6 ft 10 in (2.08 m)	250 lb (113 kg)	2003-11-18	Memphis
F	19	Simone Fontecchio	6 ft 7 in (2.01 m)	209 lb (95 kg)	1995-12-09	Italy
G/F	8	Tim Hardaway Jr.	6 ft 5 in (1.96 m)	205 lb (93 kg)	1992-03-16	Michigan
F	13	Ron Harper Jr. (TW)	6 ft 4 in (1.93 m)	233 lb (106 kg)	2000-04-12	Rutgers
F	12	Tobias Harris	6 ft 8 in (2.03 m)	226 lb (103 kg)	1992-07-15	Tennessee
F	00	Ron Holland II	6 ft 8 in (2.03 m)	206 lb (93 kg)	2005-07-07	Duncanville HS (TX)
G	23	Jaden Ivey (injured)	6 ft 4 in (1.93 m)	195 lb (88 kg)	2002-02-13	Purdue
G	24	Daniss Jenkins (TW)	6 ft 3 in (1.91 m)	165 lb (75 kg)	2001-08-17	St. John's
F	34	Bobi Klintman (GL)	6 ft 9 in (2.06 m)	225 lb (102 kg)	2003-03-06	Wake Forest
F/C	7	Paul Reed	6 ft 9 in (2.06 m)	210 lb (95 kg)	1999-06-26	DePaul
G	25	Marcus Sasser	6 ft 2 in (1.88 m)	195 lb (88 kg)	2000-09-21	Houston
G	17	Dennis Schröder	6 ft 1 in (1.85 m)	175 lb (79 kg)	1993-09-15	Germany
F	35	Tolu Smith (TW)	6 ft 11 in (2.11 m)	245 lb (111 kg)	2001-07-26	Mississippi State
C	28	Isaiah Stewart	6 ft 8 in (2.03 m)	250 lb (113 kg)	2001-05-22	Washington
G/F	9	Ausar Thompson	6 ft 6 in (1.98 m)	205 lb (93 kg)	2003-01-30	Pine Crest (FL)
G/F	43	Lindy Waters III	6 ft 6 in (1.98 m)	210 lb (95 kg)	1997-07-28	Oklahoma State

Coaches
Head coach
- J. B. Bickerstaff
Assistant(s)
- Jerome Allen
- Kevin Burleson
- Josh Estes
- Jarrett Jack
- Sidney Lowe
- Vitaly Potapenko
- Steve Scalzi
- Fred Vinson
- Luke Walton

Legend
- (DP) Unsigned draft pick
- (FA) Free agent
- (S) Suspended
- (GL) On assignment to G League affiliate
- (TW) Two-way affiliate player
- Injured

Roster
Updated: February 6, 2025

== Standings ==
=== Division ===
Central Division	W	L	PCT	GB	Home	Road	Div	GP
c – Cleveland Cavaliers	64	18	.780	–	34‍–‍7	30‍–‍11	12‍–‍4	82
x – Indiana Pacers	50	32	.610	14.0	29‍–‍12	21‍–‍20	10‍–‍6	82
x – Milwaukee Bucks	48	34	.585	16.0	28‍–‍14	20‍–‍20	9‍–‍7	82
x – Detroit Pistons	44	38	.537	20.0	22‍–‍19	22‍–‍19	5‍–‍11	82
pi – Chicago Bulls	39	43	.476	25.0	18‍–‍23	21‍–‍20	4‍–‍12	82

=== Conference ===
Eastern Conference
#	Team	W	L	PCT	GB	GP
1	c – Cleveland Cavaliers *	64	18	.780	–	82
2	y – Boston Celtics *	61	21	.744	3.0	82
3	x – New York Knicks	51	31	.622	13.0	82
4	x – Indiana Pacers	50	32	.610	14.0	82
5	x – Milwaukee Bucks	48	34	.585	16.0	82
6	x – Detroit Pistons	44	38	.537	20.0	82
7	y – Orlando Magic *	41	41	.500	23.0	82
8	pi – Atlanta Hawks	40	42	.488	24.0	82
9	pi – Chicago Bulls	39	43	.476	25.0	82
10	x – Miami Heat	37	45	.451	27.0	82
11	Toronto Raptors	30	52	.366	34.0	82
12	Brooklyn Nets	26	56	.317	38.0	82
13	Philadelphia 76ers	24	58	.293	40.0	82
14	Charlotte Hornets	19	63	.232	45.0	82
15	Washington Wizards	18	64	.220	46.0	82

== Game log ==
=== Preseason ===
During the preseason, the Pistons played their games on what was previously known as Bally Sports Detroit. Bally Sports rebranded itself as FanDuel Sports Network prior to the start of the regular season on October 21, 2024.

2024 preseason game log
Total: 3–2 (Home: 2–1; Road: 1–1)
Preseason: 3–2 (home: 2–1; road: 1–1)

Game	Date	Team	Score	High points	High rebounds	High assists	Location Attendance	Record
1	October 6	Milwaukee	W 120–87	Jaden Ivey (22)	Jalen Duren (9)	Marcus Sasser (9)	Little Caesars Arena; 9,811	1–0
2	October 8	Phoenix	L 97–105	Jalen Duren (17)	Jalen Duren (6)	Cade Cunningham (8)	Breslin Center; 14,901	1–1
3	October 11	@ Phoenix	W 109–91	Cade Cunningham (25)	Cade Cunningham (12)	Cade Cunningham (9)	Footprint Center; 17,071	2–1
4	October 13	@ Golden State	L 93–111	Jaden Ivey (19)	Jalen Duren (9)	Cade Cunningham (7)	Chase Center; 18,064	2–2
5	October 16	Cleveland	W 108–92	Simone Fontecchio (18)	Paul Reed (9)	Marcus Sasser (5)	Little Caesars Arena; 8,411	3–2

2024–25 preseason schedule

=== Regular season ===
2024–25 game log
Total: 44–38 (Home: 22–19; Road: 22–19)
October: 1–4 (home: 0–2; road: 1–2)

Game	Date	Team	Score	High points	High rebounds	High assists	Location Attendance	Record
1	October 23	Indiana	L 109–115	Cade Cunningham (28)	Jalen Duren (13)	Cade Cunningham (8)	Little Caesars Arena; 20,062	0–1
2	October 25	@ Cleveland	L 101–113	Cade Cunningham (33)	Duren, Holland (7)	Cade Cunningham (6)	Rocket Mortgage FieldHouse; 19,432	0–2
3	October 26	Boston	L 118–124	Jaden Ivey (26)	Tobias Harris (11)	Cade Cunningham (10)	Little Caesars Arena; 19,311	0–3
4	October 28	@ Miami	L 98–106	Cade Cunningham (24)	Isaiah Stewart (15)	Cade Cunningham (6)	Kaseya Center; 19,626	0–4
5	October 30	@ Philadelphia	W 105–95	Jaden Ivey (23)	Tobias Harris (14)	Cade Cunningham (7)	Wells Fargo Center; 19,759	1–4

November: 8–9 (home: 4–4; road: 4–5)

Game	Date	Team	Score	High points	High rebounds	High assists	Location Attendance	Record
6	November 1	New York	L 98–128	Cade Cunningham (22)	Tobias Harris (8)	Cade Cunningham (6)	Little Caesars Arena; 17,022	1–5
7	November 3	@ Brooklyn	W 106–92	Cade Cunningham (19)	Jalen Duren (17)	Tobias Harris (6)	Barclays Center; 17,086	2–5
8	November 4	L.A. Lakers	W 115–103	Jaden Ivey (26)	Jalen Duren (14)	Cade Cunningham (11)	Little Caesars Arena; 20,062	3–5
9	November 6	@ Charlotte	L 107–108	Jaden Ivey (21)	Cade Cunningham (10)	Cade Cunningham (10)	Spectrum Center; 13,247	3–6
10	November 8	Atlanta	W 122–121	Beasley, Cunningham, Harris (22)	Cunningham, Stewart (11)	Cade Cunningham (13)	Little Caesars Arena; 17,913	4–6
11	November 10	Houston	L 99–101	Cade Cunningham (26)	Cunningham, Harris, Stewart (8)	Cade Cunningham (9)	Little Caesars Arena; 18,744	4–7
12	November 12	Miami	W 123–121 (OT)	Beasley, Cunningham (21)	Jalen Duren (11)	Cade Cunningham (9)	Little Caesars Arena; 17,806	5–7
13	November 13	@ Milwaukee	L 120–127 (OT)	Cade Cunningham (35)	Malik Beasley (10)	Cade Cunningham (11)	Fiserv Forum; 17,341	5–8
14	November 15	@ Toronto	W 99–95	Malik Beasley (20)	Tobias Harris (11)	Cade Cunningham (10)	Scotiabank Arena; 19,245	6–8
15	November 17	@ Washington	W 124–104	Jaden Ivey (28)	Cunningham, Duren (10)	Cade Cunningham (10)	Capital One Arena; 14,789	7–8
16	November 18	Chicago	L 112–122	Cade Cunningham (26)	Jalen Duren (22)	Cade Cunningham (10)	Little Caesars Arena; 18,022	7–9
17	November 21	@ Charlotte	L 121–123 (OT)	Cade Cunningham (27)	Duren, Stewart (9)	Cade Cunningham (10)	Spectrum Center; 14,671	7–10
18	November 23	@ Orlando	L 100–111	Jaden Ivey (19)	Jaden Ivey (7)	Beasley, Stewart (4)	Kia Center; 19,094	7–11
19	November 25	Toronto	W 102–100	Jaden Ivey (25)	Jalen Duren (12)	Jaden Ivey (8)	Little Caesars Arena; 18,421	8–11
20	November 27	@ Memphis	L 111–131	Marcus Sasser (22)	Duren, Moore Jr., Reed (7)	Marcus Sasser (5)	FedExForum; 16,261	8–12
21	November 29	@ Indiana	W 130–106	Malik Beasley (25)	Jalen Duren (12)	Cade Cunningham (11)	Gainbridge Fieldhouse; 17,274	9–12
22	November 30	Philadelphia	L 96–111	Malik Beasley (19)	Simone Fontecchio (11)	Jaden Ivey (5)	Little Caesars Arena; 22,062	9–13

December: 5–5 (home: 1–2; road: 4–3)

Game	Date	Team	Score	High points	High rebounds	High assists	Location Attendance	Record
23	December 3	Milwaukee	L 107–128	Cade Cunningham (23)	Duren, Stewart (6)	Cade Cunningham (6)	Little Caesars Arena; 17,988	9–14
24	December 4	@ Boston	L 120–130	Cunningham, Harris (27)	Cade Cunningham (9)	Cade Cunningham (14)	TD Garden; 19,156	9–15
25	December 7	@ New York	W 120–111	Cade Cunningham (29)	Cade Cunningham (10)	Cade Cunningham (15)	Madison Square Garden; 19,812	10–15
26	December 12	@ Boston	L 99–123	Ron Holland II (26)	Cunningham, Harris (8)	Cade Cunningham (8)	TD Garden; 19,156	10–16
27	December 16	Miami	W 125–124 (OT)	Malik Beasley (28)	Jalen Duren (16)	Cade Cunningham (18)	Little Caesars Arena; 17,810	11–16
28	December 19	Utah	L 119–126	Cade Cunningham (33)	Paul Reed (9)	Cade Cunningham (7)	Little Caesars Arena; 18,022	11–17
29	December 21	@ Phoenix	W 133–125	Cade Cunningham (28)	Jalen Duren (11)	Cade Cunningham (13)	Footprint Center; 17,071	12–17
30	December 23	@ L.A. Lakers	W 117–114	Malik Beasley (21)	Jalen Duren (9)	Cade Cunningham (10)	Crypto.com Arena; 18,997	13–17
31	December 26	@ Sacramento	W 114–113	Cade Cunningham (33)	Jalen Duren (10)	Cade Cunningham (10)	Golden 1 Center; 17,832	14–17
32	December 28	@ Denver	L 121–134	Cunningham, Ivey (17)	Jalen Duren (7)	Cade Cunningham (8)	Ball Arena; 19,876	14–18

January: 10–6 (home: 6–3; road: 4–3)

Game	Date	Team	Score	High points	High rebounds	High assists	Location Attendance	Record
33	January 1	Orlando	W 105–96	Jaden Ivey (22)	Jalen Duren (11)	Cade Cunningham (9)	Little Caesars Arena; 19,399	15–18
34	January 3	Charlotte	W 98–94	Tobias Harris (24)	Jalen Duren (14)	Cunningham, Sasser (5)	Little Caesars Arena; 18,866	16–18
35	January 4	Minnesota	W 119–105	Cade Cunningham (40)	Tobias Harris (11)	Cade Cunningham (9)	Little Caesars Arena; 20,062	17–18
36	January 6	Portland	W 118–115	Cade Cunningham (32)	Jalen Duren (12)	Cade Cunningham (9)	Little Caesars Arena; 16,002	18–18
37	January 8	@ Brooklyn	W 113–98	Malik Beasley (23)	Jalen Duren (9)	Beasley, Cunningham, Harris (5)	Barclays Center; 16,098	19–18
38	January 9	Golden State	L 104–107	Cade Cunningham (32)	Jalen Duren (12)	Cade Cunningham (8)	Little Caesars Arena; 20,062	19–19
39	January 11	Toronto	W 123–114	Tim Hardaway Jr. (27)	Cade Cunningham (10)	Cade Cunningham (17)	Little Caesars Arena; 19,011	20–19
40	January 13	@ New York	W 124–119	Cade Cunningham (36)	Duren, Harris (8)	Cunningham, Sasser (4)	Madison Square Garden; 19,812	21–19
41	January 16	Indiana	L 100–111	Tim Hardaway Jr. (25)	Jalen Duren (17)	Cade Cunningham (9)	Little Caesars Arena; 16,366	21–20
42	January 18	Phoenix	L 121–125	Tobias Harris (21)	Jalen Duren (10)	Cade Cunningham (11)	Little Caesars Arena; 20,062	21–21
43	January 20	@ Houston	W 107–96	Cade Cunningham (32)	Jalen Duren (14)	Cade Cunningham (7)	Toyota Center; 18,055	22–21
44	January 22	@ Atlanta	W 114–104	Cade Cunningham (29)	Duren, Stewart (12)	Cade Cunningham (11)	State Farm Arena; 13,983	23–21
45	January 25	@ Orlando	L 113–121	Cade Cunningham (35)	Jalen Duren (8)	Cade Cunningham (11)	Kia Center; 19,489	23–22
46	January 27	@ Cleveland	L 91–110	Cade Cunningham (22)	Jalen Duren (16)	Cade Cunningham (7)	Rocket Mortgage FieldHouse; 19,432	23–23
47	January 29	@ Indiana	L 119–133	Cade Cunningham (32)	Jalen Duren (10)	Cade Cunningham (9)	Gainbridge Fieldhouse; 16,275	23–24
48	January 31	Dallas	W 117–102	Cade Cunningham (40)	Jalen Duren (13)	Jalen Duren (5)	Little Caesars Arena; 20,062	24–24

February: 9–3 (home: 5–3; road: 4–0)

Game	Date	Team	Score	High points	High rebounds	High assists	Location Attendance	Record
49	February 2	Chicago	W 127–119	Cade Cunningham (22)	Jalen Duren (13)	Cade Cunningham (15)	Little Caesars Arena; 20,062	25–24
50	February 3	Atlanta	L 130–132	Cade Cunningham (30)	Jalen Duren (9)	Cade Cunningham (14)	Little Caesars Arena; 15,988	25–25
51	February 5	Cleveland	L 115–118	Cade Cunningham (38)	Jalen Duren (10)	Cade Cunningham (9)	Little Caesars Arena; 18,734	25–26
52	February 7	Philadelphia	W 125–112	Malik Beasley (36)	Jalen Duren (13)	Jalen Duren (7)	Little Caesars Arena; 19,241	26–26
53	February 9	Charlotte	W 112–102	Tobias Harris (20)	Jalen Duren (12)	Cade Cunningham (12)	Little Caesars Arena; 18,740	27–26
54	February 11	@ Chicago	W 132–92	Malik Beasley (24)	Jalen Duren (11)	Cade Cunningham (7)	United Center; 18,321	28–26
55	February 12	@ Chicago	W 128–110	Cade Cunningham (29)	Jalen Duren (14)	Cunningham, Thompson (7)	United Center; 18,916	29–26
All-Star Game
56	February 21	@ San Antonio	W 125–110	Cade Cunningham (25)	Jalen Duren (15)	Cade Cunningham (12)	Moody Center; 16,143	30–26
57	February 23	@ Atlanta	W 148–143	Cade Cunningham (38)	Beasley, Cunningham (7)	Cade Cunningham (12)	State Farm Arena; 17,051	31–26
58	February 24	L.A. Clippers	W 106–97	Cade Cunningham (32)	Jalen Duren (19)	Cade Cunningham (7)	Little Caesars Arena; 18,989	32–26
59	February 26	Boston	W 117–97	Malik Beasley (26)	Jalen Duren (11)	Cade Cunningham (11)	Little Caesars Arena; 20,062	33–26
60	February 28	Denver	L 119–134	Malik Beasley (16)	Jalen Duren (8)	Dennis Schröder (7)	Little Caesars Arena; 20,062	33–27

March: 9–6 (home: 5–2; road: 4–4)

Game	Date	Team	Score	High points	High rebounds	High assists	Location Attendance	Record
61	March 1	Brooklyn	W 115–94	Beasley, Duren, Harris (18)	Jalen Duren (11)	Cade Cunningham (9)	Little Caesars Arena; 20,062	34–27
62	March 3	@ Utah	W 134–106	Cade Cunningham (29)	Jalen Duren (12)	Cade Cunningham (9)	Delta Center; 18,175	35–27
63	March 5	@ L.A. Clippers	L 115–123	Cade Cunningham (37)	Cade Cunningham (7)	Cade Cunningham (10)	Intuit Dome; 17,927	35–28
64	March 8	@ Golden State	L 110–115	Cade Cunningham (31)	Jalen Duren (13)	Cade Cunningham (5)	Chase Center; 18,064	35–29
65	March 9	@ Portland	W 119–112	Cade Cunningham (28)	Jalen Duren (12)	Cade Cunningham (5)	Moda Center; 19,661	36–29
66	March 11	Washington	W 123–103	Cade Cunningham (27)	Jalen Duren (13)	Cade Cunningham (10)	Little Caesars Arena; 17,699	37–29
67	March 13	Washington	L 125–129	Cade Cunningham (38)	Jalen Duren (14)	Cade Cunningham (10)	Little Caesars Arena; 20,062	37–30
68	March 15	Oklahoma City	L 107–113	Tobias Harris (18)	Cunningham, Harris, Stewart (8)	Dennis Schröder (11)	Little Caesars Arena; 20,062	37–31
69	March 17	@ New Orleans	W 127–81	Cade Cunningham (24)	Duren, Fontecchio (7)	Cade Cunningham (8)	Smoothie King Center; 17,398	38–31
70	March 19	@ Miami	W 116–113	Cade Cunningham (25)	Cade Cunningham (12)	Cade Cunningham (11)	Kaseya Center; 19,600	39–31
71	March 21	@ Dallas	L 117–123	Cade Cunningham (35)	Jalen Duren (9)	Cade Cunningham (6)	American Airlines Center; 20,071	39–32
72	March 23	New Orleans	W 136–130	Ron Holland II (26)	Jalen Duren (12)	Ron Holland II (6)	Little Caesars Arena; 20,062	40–32
73	March 25	San Antonio	W 122–96	Marcus Sasser (27)	Tobias Harris (8)	Jalen Duren (7)	Little Caesars Arena; 19,511	41–32
74	March 28	Cleveland	W 133–122	Tim Hardaway Jr. (32)	Jalen Duren (13)	Dennis Schröder (10)	Little Caesars Arena; 20,062	42–32
75	March 30	@ Minnesota	L 104–123	Malik Beasley (27)	Jalen Duren (11)	Dennis Schröder (11)	Target Center; 18,978	42–33

April: 2–5 (home: 1–3; road: 1–2)

Game	Date	Team	Score	High points	High rebounds	High assists	Location Attendance	Record
76	April 2	@ Oklahoma City	L 103–119	Tim Hardaway Jr. (23)	Jalen Duren (13)	Dennis Schröder (7)	Paycom Center; 18,203	42–34
77	April 4	@ Toronto	W 117–105	Tim Hardaway Jr. (23)	Jalen Duren (18)	Dennis Schröder (7)	Scotiabank Arena; 19,491	43–34
78	April 5	Memphis	L 103–109	Cade Cunningham (25)	Ausar Thompson (11)	Ausar Thompson (5)	Little Caesars Arena; 20,062	43–35
79	April 7	Sacramento	L 117–127	Cade Cunningham (35)	Isaiah Stewart (10)	Jalen Duren (6)	Little Caesars Arena; 19,208	43–36
80	April 10	New York	W 115–106	Cade Cunningham (36)	Jalen Duren (13)	Cade Cunningham (8)	Little Caesars Arena; 20,062	44–36
81	April 11	Milwaukee	L 119–125	Cade Cunningham (36)	Jalen Duren (16)	Cade Cunningham (12)	Little Caesars Arena; 20,062	44–37
82	April 13	@ Milwaukee	L 133–140 (OT)	Malik Beasley (23)	Tolu Smith (8)	Marcus Sasser (10)	Fiserv Forum; 17,796	44–38

2024–25 season schedule

=== Playoffs ===
2025 playoff game log
Total: 2–4 (home: 0–3; road: 2–1)
First Round: 2–4 (home: 0–3; road: 2–1)

Game	Date	Team	Score	High points	High rebounds	High assists	Location Attendance	Series
1	April 19	@ New York	L 112–123	Tobias Harris (25)	four players (6)	Cade Cunningham (12)	Madison Square Garden; 19,812	0–1
2	April 21	@ New York	W 100–94	Cade Cunningham (33)	Duren, Harris (13)	Cunningham, Schröder (3)	Madison Square Garden; 19,812	1–1
3	April 24	New York	L 116–118	Cunningham, Hardaway Jr. (24)	Duren, Reed (8)	Cade Cunningham (11)	Little Caesars Arena; 20,062	1–2
4	April 27	New York	L 93–94	Cade Cunningham (25)	Jalen Duren (17)	Cade Cunningham (10)	Little Caesars Arena; 20,062	1–3
5	April 29	@ New York	W 106–103	Cade Cunningham (24)	Jalen Duren (14)	Cade Cunningham (8)	Madison Square Garden; 19,812	2–3
6	May 1	New York	L 113–116	Cade Cunningham (23)	Cade Cunningham (7)	Dennis Schröder (9)	Little Caesars Arena; 20,062	2–4

2025 playoff schedule

=== NBA Cup ===
The groups were revealed during the tournament announcement on July 12, 2024.

==== East Group B ====
Pos	Team	Pld	W	L	PF	PA	PD	Qualification
1	Milwaukee Bucks	4	4	0	462	412	+50	Advance to knockout stage
2	Detroit Pistons	4	3	1	447	440	+7	
3	Miami Heat	4	2	2	459	439	+20	
4	Toronto Raptors	4	1	3	413	430	−17	
5	Indiana Pacers	4	0	4	445	505	−60	

Source: NBA
Rules for classification: Tiebreakers

== Player statistics ==
Legend
GP	Games played	GS	Games started	MPG	Minutes per game
FG%	Field-goal percentage	3P%	3-point field-goal percentage	FT%	Free-throw percentage
RPG	Rebounds per game	APG	Assists per game	SPG	Steals per game
BPG	Blocks per game	PPG	Points per game

=== Regular season ===
Detroit Pistons statistics
Player	GP	GS	MPG	FG%	3P%	FT%	RPG	APG	SPG	BPG	PPG
Malik Beasley	82	18	27.8	.430	.416	.679	2.6	1.7	.9	.1	16.3
Cade Cunningham	70	70	35.0	.469	.356	.846	6.1	9.1	1.0	.8	26.1
Jalen Duren	78	78	26.1	.692		.669	10.3	2.7	.7	1.1	11.8
Simone Fontecchio	75	0	16.5	.402	.335	.833	2.9	.9	.4	.2	5.9
Tim Hardaway Jr.	77	77	28.0	.406	.368	.855	2.4	1.6	.5	.1	11.0
Ron Harper Jr.	1	0	17.0	.125	.000	1.000	7.0	2.0	.0	.0	4.0
Tobias Harris	73	73	31.6	.477	.345	.861	5.9	2.2	1.0	.8	13.7
Ron Holland	81	2	15.6	.474	.238	.754	2.7	1.0	.6	.2	6.4
Jaden Ivey	30	30	29.9	.460	.409	.733	4.1	4.0	.9	.4	17.6
Daniss Jenkins	7	0	3.3	.300	.143	.000	.3	.4	.0	.0	1.0
Bobi Klintman	8	0	5.3	.600	.400	.500	.9	.9	.3	.1	1.9
Wendell Moore Jr.^{†}	20	1	10.9	.460	.286	.929	2.2	1.2	.5	.2	3.2
Paul Reed	45	0	9.7	.507	.286	.762	2.7	1.0	.9	.6	4.1
Marcus Sasser	57	1	14.2	.463	.382	.843	1.2	2.3	.6	.1	6.6
Dennis Schröder^{†}	28	8	25.2	.378	.302	.833	2.6	5.3	.5	.2	10.8
Tolu Smith	1	0	22.4	.667		.667	8.0	.0	.0	.0	14.0
Isaiah Stewart	72	4	19.9	.559	.321	.759	5.5	1.7	.4	1.4	6.0
Cole Swider^{†}	2	0	6.6	.000	.000		1.0	.5	.0	.0	.0
Ausar Thompson	59	48	22.5	.535	.224	.641	5.1	2.3	1.7	.7	10.1
Lindy Waters III^{†}	14	0	8.8	.364	.395		1.0	.7	.4	.1	3.4
Alondes Williams	1	0	3.7	1.000	1.000		.0	1.0	.0	.0	5.0

=== Playoffs ===
Detroit Pistons statistics
Player	GP	GS	MPG	FG%	3P%	FT%	RPG	APG	SPG	BPG	PPG
Malik Beasley	6	0	27.2	.373	.339	1.000	2.5	1.2	.5	.2	14.0
Cade Cunningham	6	6	41.3	.426	.179	.833	8.3	8.7	1.8	1.3	25.0
Jalen Duren	6	6	33.9	.650		.826	10.7	3.5	.3	1.7	11.8
Tim Hardaway Jr.	6	6	31.4	.338	.308	.800	2.8	1.2	.3	.0	12.0
Tobias Harris	6	6	38.8	.479	.435	1.000	7.7	.5	1.0	1.2	15.7
Ron Holland	5	0	6.7	.000	.000	.900	1.2	.0	.0	.2	1.8
Paul Reed	5	0	10.6	.625		.667	3.0	.2	1.0	.6	2.8
Dennis Schröder	6	0	27.4	.491	.476	.813	2.3	3.7	1.2	.2	12.5
Isaiah Stewart	1	0	18.9	.500			5.0	1.0	.0	2.0	2.0
Ausar Thompson	6	6	22.5	.571	.000	.583	5.2	1.0	1.2	.8	11.5

- ^{†} Denotes player spent time with another team in the season. Stats reflect time with the Pistons only.

== Transactions ==
=== Overview ===
Players Added

Via draft

- Ron Holland II
- Cam Spencer

Via trade

- Tim Hardaway Jr.
- Bobi Klintman
- Kenyon Martin Jr.
- Wendell Moore Jr.
- Dennis Schröder
- Lindy Waters III

Via free agency

- Malik Beasley
- Ron Harper Jr.
- Tobias Harris
- Daniss Jenkins
- Javante McCoy
- Paul Reed
- Tolu Smith
- Cole Swider
- Alondes Williams
Players Lost

Via trade

- Quentin Grimes
- Kenyon Martin Jr.
- Cam Spencer

Via free agency

- Malachi Flynn
- Evan Fournier
- Taj Gibson
- Chimezie Metu
- Stanley Umude
- James Wiseman

Waived

- Buddy Boeheim
- Troy Brown Jr.
- Tosan Evbuomwan
- Javante McCoy
- Wendell Moore Jr.
- Paul Reed
- Cole Swider
- Alondes Williams

=== Trades ===
July 6, 2024
To Detroit Pistons

Tim Hardaway Jr.
Three future second-round picks
To Dallas Mavericks

Quentin Grimes
July 6, 2024
To Detroit Pistons

Wendell Moore Jr.
Draft rights to Bobi Klintman
To Minnesota Timberwolves

Draft rights to Cam Spencer
February 6, 2025
Five-team trade
To Golden State Warriors

Jimmy Butler (from Miami)
Two second-round picks (from Miami)
Cash considerations (from Miami)

To Detroit Pistons

Dennis Schröder (from Utah via Golden State)
Lindy Waters III (from Golden State)
2031 second-round pick (from Golden State)

To Miami Heat

Kyle Anderson (from Golden State)
Davion Mitchell (from Toronto)
Andrew Wiggins (from Golden State)
2025 protected first-round pick (from Golden State)

To Toronto Raptors

P. J. Tucker (from Utah)
2026 second-round pick (from Miami)
Cash considerations (from Miami)

To Utah Jazz

Kenyon Martin Jr. (from Detroit via Philadelphia)
Josh Richardson (from Miami)
2028 second-round pick (from Detroit via Philadelphia)
2031 second-round pick (from Miami)
Cash considerations (from Miami)

=== Free agency ===
==== Re-signed ====
Date	Player	Ref.
July 10	Cade Cunningham	
July 12	Simone Fontecchio	
December 16	Paul Reed	

==== Additions ====
Date	Player	Former team	Ref.
July 6	Daniss Jenkins	St. John's Red Storm	
July 8	Tobias Harris	Philadelphia 76ers	
July 9	Paul Reed	Philadelphia 76ers	
July 11	Malik Beasley	Milwaukee Bucks	
October 21	Cole Swider	Indiana Pacers	
October 22	Alondes Williams	Miami Heat	
December 15	Javante McCoy	Motor City Cruise	
January 6	Ron Harper Jr.	Maine Celtics	
January 6	Tolu Smith	Motor City Cruise	

==== Subtractions ====
Date	Player	Reason	New team	Ref.
June 29	Buddy Boeheim	Waived	Oklahoma City Thunder	
June 29	Troy Brown Jr.	Waived	(Turkey) Manisa Basket	
July 5	James Wiseman	Unrestricted free agent	Indiana Pacers	
July 9	Stanley Umude	Unrestricted free agent	Milwaukee Bucks	
July 13	Taj Gibson	Unrestricted free agent	Charlotte Hornets	
July 30	Chimezie Metu	Unrestricted free agent	(Spain) FC Barcelona	
August 7	Malachi Flynn	Unrestricted free agent	San Antonio Spurs	
September 2	Evan Fournier	Unrestricted free agent	(Greece) Olympiacos	
October 16	Tosan Evbuomwan	Waived	Los Angeles Clippers	
December 14	Paul Reed	Waived	—N/a	
December 16	Javante McCoy	Waived	Motor City Cruise	
January 6	Cole Swider	Waived	South Bay Lakers	
January 6	Alondes Williams	Waived	Sioux Falls Skyforce	
February 6	Wendell Moore Jr.	Waived	Charlotte Hornets	
