= Isaiah Stewart =

American basketball player (born 2001)

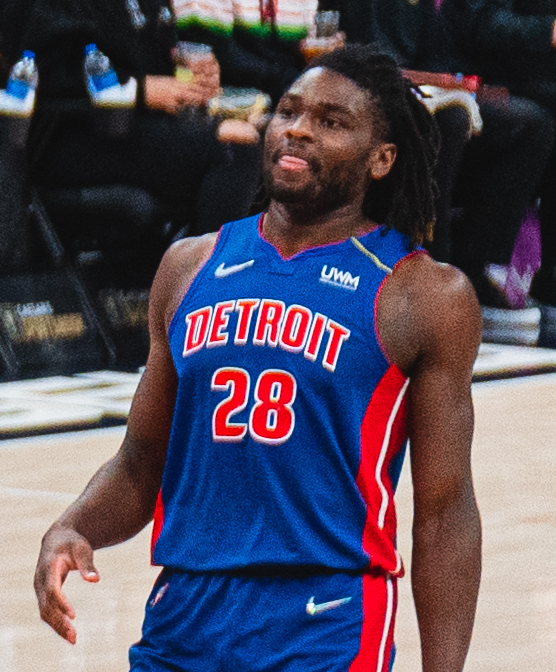
- Stewart with the Detroit Pistons in 2022

No. 28 – Memphis Grizzlies
- Position: Center / power forward
- League: NBA

Personal information
- Born: May 22, 2001 (age 25) Rochester, New York, U.S.
- Listed height: 6 ft 8 in (2.03 m)
- Listed weight: 250 lb (113 kg)

Career information
- High school: McQuaid Jesuit (Brighton, New York); La Lumiere School (La Porte, Indiana)
- College: Washington (2019–2020)
- NBA draft: 2020: 1st round, 16th overall pick
- Drafted by: Portland Trail Blazers
- Playing career: 2020–present

Career history
- 2020–2026: Detroit Pistons
- 2026–present: Memphis Grizzlies

Career highlights
- NBA All-Rookie Second Team (2021); First-team All-Pac-12 (2020); Pac-12 All-Freshman Team (2020); National high school player of the year (2019); McDonald's All-American (2019)
- Stats at NBA.com
- Stats at Basketball Reference
Medals
Men's basketball
Representing the United States
FIBA World U17 Cup
Gold medal – first place	2018 Argentina	Team

Isaiah Stewart II (born May 22, 2001), nicknamed Beef Stew, is an American professional basketball player for the Memphis Grizzlies of the National Basketball Association (NBA). He played college basketball for the Washington Huskies. Listed at 6 feet 8 inches (2.03 m) and 250 pounds (113 kg), he plays the center and power forward positions.

Stewart attended McQuaid Jesuit High School in New York in his first two years of high school, after which he transferred to La Lumiere School, a prep school in Indiana. He was a consensus five-star recruit and was ranked among the top players in the 2019 class. Stewart earned McDonald's All-American honors and was named Mr. Basketball USA and Naismith Prep Player of the Year.

== Early life ==
Stewart was born in Rochester, New York. He grew up boxing and playing soccer. Starting in fifth grade, Stewart focused on basketball, which he was drawn to because of his size and athleticism. He played organized basketball for the first time at age 10, while attending elementary school in Rochester. At age 12, Stewart stood around 6 feet 0 inches (1.83 m).

== High school ==
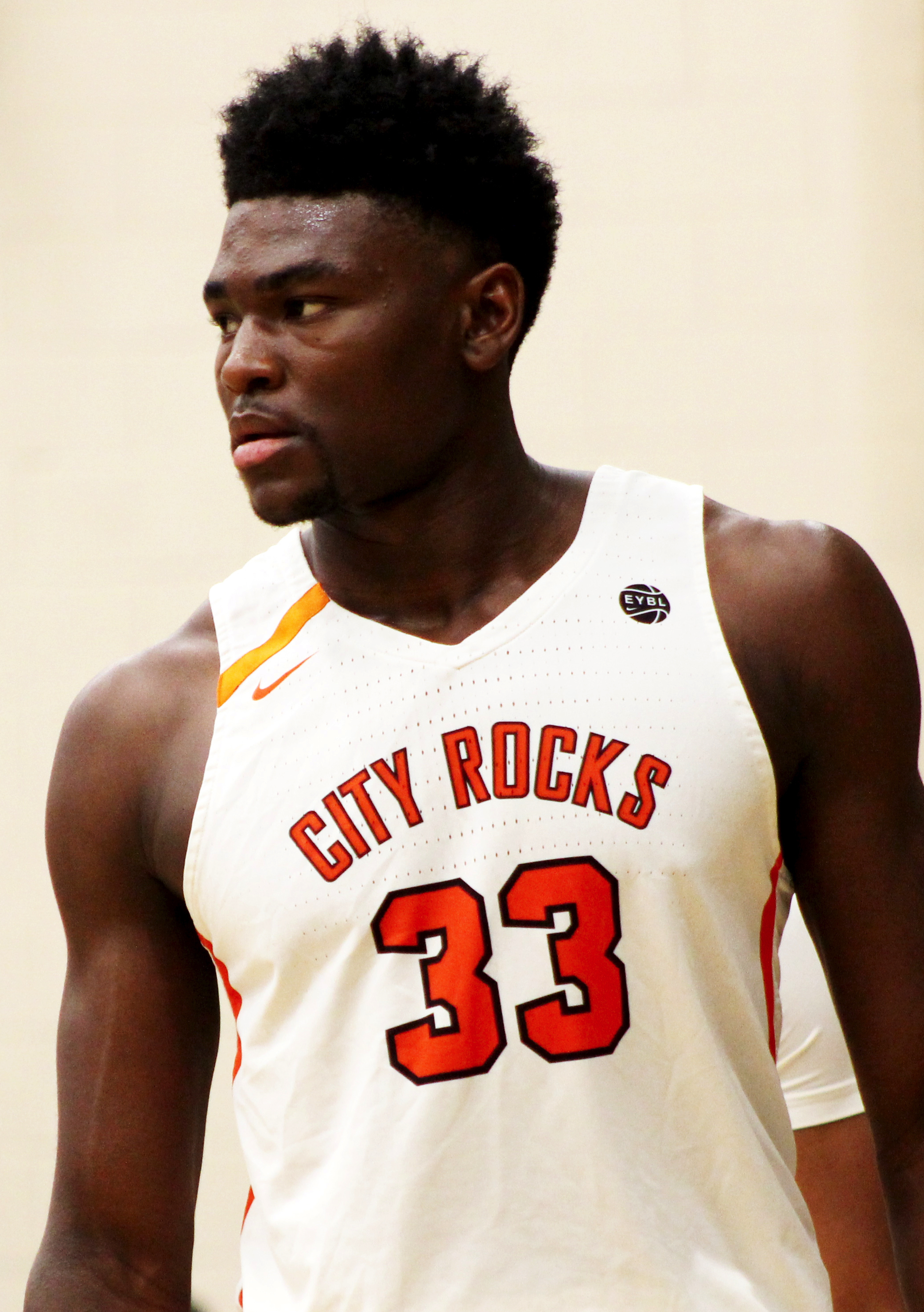
Stewart at the Nike EYBL in July 2018

Stewart attended McQuaid Jesuit High School in his first two years of high school. When he was 14 years old, as a freshman, he stood 6 feet 7 inches (2.01 m). In his freshman season, Stewart averaged 18.5 points, 12.4 rebounds and 3.1 blocks per game, recording two back-to-back 40-point games, and was named Rochester City Athletic Conference player of the year. In October 2016, he broke his tailbone during United States national under-16 team tryouts and consequently missed most of his sophomore season. On February 2, 2017, Stewart returned to the court, posting 35 points, 14 rebounds, and six blocks in his season debut.

Entering his junior year, Stewart transferred to La Lumiere School, a prep school in La Porte, Indiana with a prestigious basketball program. In 19 games, he averaged 19.8 points, 11.2 rebounds, and 2.4 blocks per game, leading his team to a 25–4 record. Stewart earned MaxPreps Junior All-American honorable mention recognition. In his senior season with La Lumiere, he averaged 18.1 points, 11.3 rebounds, and 2.9 blocks per game, helping his team to a 30–1 record. Stewart won the Naismith Prep Player of the Year and Mr. Basketball USA awards. He was named to the USA Today All-USA first team and MaxPreps All-American second team. Stewart played in the McDonald's All-American Game, Jordan Brand Classic, and Nike Hoop Summit.

=== Recruiting ===
Stewart finished his high school career as a consensus five-star recruit and top-five player in the 2019 class. On January 21, 2019, he committed to playing college basketball for Washington. The other finalists to land him were Duke, Kentucky, Michigan State, and Syracuse. Stewart was drawn to Washington because of his longtime relationship with Mike Hopkins. He knew Hopkins, a former Syracuse assistant coach, since his time playing for McQuaid Jesuit.

College recruiting
Name	Hometown	School	Height	Weight	Commit date
Isaiah Stewart; C	Rochester, NY	La Lumiere School (IN)	6 ft 9 in (2.06 m)	245 lb (111 kg)	Jan 20, 2019
Isaiah Stewart; C	Recruit ratings: Rivals: 247Sports: ESPN: (96)				
Overall recruit ranking: Rivals: 2 247Sports: 4 ESPN: 3
Note: In many cases, Scout, Rivals, 247Sports, On3, and ESPN may conflict in their listings of height and weight.; In these cases, the average was taken. ESPN grades are on a 100-point scale.; Sources: "Washington 2019 Basketball Commitments". Rivals.; "2019 Washington Huskies Recruiting Class". ESPN.; "2019 Team Ranking". Rivals.

== College career ==
Heading into the season Stewart and teammate Jaden McDaniels were projected as potential top 3 picks for the 2020 NBA draft and possibly going first and second. In part to this, Washington also received a lot of hype. Stewart made his college debut for UW against the Baylor Bears in the 2019 Armed Forces Classic, recording 15 points and seven rebounds, including the game-winning basket in a 67–64 victory for Washington. At the conclusion of the regular season, Stewart was named to the All-Pac-12 first team and the Freshman Team. Stewart posted 29 points and 12 rebounds against Arizona in the Pac-12 tournament. He averaged 17 points, 8.8 rebounds and 2.1 blocks per game as a freshman. On April 1, 2020, Stewart declared for the 2020 NBA draft, forgoing his remaining college eligibility.

== Professional career ==
=== Detroit Pistons (2020–2026) ===
Stewart was drafted 16th overall by the Portland Trail Blazers in the 2020 NBA draft. On November 22, 2020, Stewart, Trevor Ariza, and a conditional future first-round pick were traded to the Houston Rockets in exchange for Robert Covington. On November 24, Stewart, Ariza, a future second round pick, and cash considerations were traded to the Detroit Pistons in exchange for Christian Wood, a protected future first-round pick, and a second round pick in 2021. On December 1, the Pistons announced that they had signed Stewart to his rookie scale contract. On March 26, 2021, Stewart was ejected from a game against the Brooklyn Nets with a flagrant-2 foul.

On November 21, 2021, Stewart was ejected in the third quarter after repeatedly attempting to attack LeBron James during a 116–121 loss to the Los Angeles Lakers. James initially hit Stewart in the face while attempting to block him out during a free throw attempt, which led to a bloody-faced Stewart charging at James multiple times. Stewart had to be held back by game officials and players. The next day, it was announced that Stewart would be suspended for two games.

On March 9, 2023, the Pistons announced that Stewart was diagnosed with a left shoulder impingement and would be sidelined for at least three-to-four weeks. On July 10, 2023, it was reported that Stewart had agreed to a four-year, $64 million contract extension with the Pistons.

On December 23, 2023, Stewart was ejected from a game against the Philadelphia 76ers with a flagrant-2 foul against Patrick Beverley. On February 14, 2024, Stewart was arrested in Phoenix for assault after punching opponent Drew Eubanks in the parking lot of Footprint Center before a matchup against the Phoenix Suns. Stewart was issued a citation and released. The NBA suspended him for 3 games.

On November 3, 2024, Stewart was assessed a flagrant 1 foul during a game against the Brooklyn Nets, and on November 13, Stewart was ejected with a flagrant 2 foul after grabbing Giannis Antetokounmpo out of the air by his jersey during a dunk attempt. On January 8, 2025, Stewart was assessed a flagrant 1 foul during another game against the Nets after elbowing Noah Clowney in the neck. On January 29, Stewart was ejected from a game against the Indiana Pacers with a flagrant 2 foul for shoving Thomas Bryant. He was automatically given a 1-game suspension for accruing his 6th flagrant foul point of the season, and he was also fined $50,000 for gestures he made after his ejection. During a March 30 game against the Minnesota Timberwolves, Stewart received a technical foul for shoving Donte DiVincenzo and then was ejected on the following play after putting Naz Reid in a chokehold. He was suspended for 2 games "based in part on his repeated history of unsportsmanlike acts".

On February 9, 2026, Stewart was ejected from a game against the Charlotte Hornets with a double technical for charging at and throwing punches at Miles Bridges in the midst of a brawl. A total of four players subsequently received suspensions as a result of the melee, with Stewart being dealt the longest suspension of seven games. Stewart made 58 total appearances (including 13 starts) for the Pistons during the 2025–26 season, averaging 10.0 points, 5.0 rebounds, and 1.1 assists.

=== Memphis Grizzlies (2026–present) ===
On July 8, 2026, Stewart was traded to the Memphis Grizzlies in a six-team, 11-player trade.

== National team career ==
Stewart played for the United States at the 2018 FIBA Under-17 Basketball World Cup in Argentina. In seven games, he averaged 11.1 points and 8.4 rebounds per game. In the finals, Stewart led all scorers with 15 points and nine rebounds in a 95–52 win over France to capture the gold medal.

== Career statistics ==
Legend
GP	Games played	GS	Games started	MPG	Minutes per game
FG%	Field goal percentage	3P%	3-point field goal percentage	FT%	Free throw percentage
RPG	Rebounds per game	APG	Assists per game	SPG	Steals per game
BPG	Blocks per game	PPG	Points per game	**Bold**	Career high

=== NBA ===
==== Regular season ====
Year	Team	GP	GS	MPG	FG%	3P%	FT%	RPG	APG	SPG	BPG	PPG
2020–21	Detroit	68	14	21.4	.553	.333	.696	6.7	.9	**.6**	1.3	7.9
2021–22	Detroit	71	**71**	25.6	.510	.326	.718	**8.7**	1.2	.3	1.1	8.3
2022–23	Detroit	50	47	28.3	.442	.327	.738	8.1	1.4	.4	.7	**11.3**
2023–24	Detroit	46	45	**30.9**	.487	**.383**	.753	6.6	1.6	.4	.8	10.9
2024–25	Detroit	**72**	4	19.9	**.559**	.321	**.759**	5.5	**1.7**	.4	1.4	6.0
2025–26	Detroit	58	13	22.7	.550	.333	.756	5.0	1.1	.3	**1.6**	10.0
Career		365	194	24.3	.514	.343	.737	6.8	1.3	.4	1.2	8.8

==== Playoffs ====
Year	Team	GP	GS	MPG	FG%	3P%	FT%	RPG	APG	SPG	BPG	PPG
2025	Detroit	1	0	**19.0**	.500	—	—	**5.0**	**1.0**	.0	**2.0**	2.0
2026	Detroit	**14**	0	11.8	**.588**	.500	.706	2.4	.2	**.1**	1.0	**4.0**
Career		15	0	12.3	.583	.500	.706	2.6	.3	.1	1.1	3.9

=== College ===
Year	Team	GP	GS	MPG	FG%	3P%	FT%	RPG	APG	SPG	BPG	PPG
2019–20	Washington	32	32	32.2	.570	.250	.774	8.8	.8	.5	2.1	17.0

== Personal life ==
Stewart's father Dela Stewart, who is a native of Jamaica, immigrated to the United States in the early 1970s for farm work. Later on, he moved to New York, where he met Stewart's mother Shameka Holloway and began working in construction. Stewart's paternal grandfather, who was a Jamaican fisherman and farmer, stood 6 feet 9 inches (2.06 m). Stewart has worn the number 33 in honor of Jamaican-American former player Patrick Ewing. Stewart has one son, Rafa Naryan Stewart (born July 24, 2024), with his wife, Kiley Stewart.

== See also ==
- List of people banned or suspended by the NBA
