= Ron Holland II =

American basketball player (born 2005)

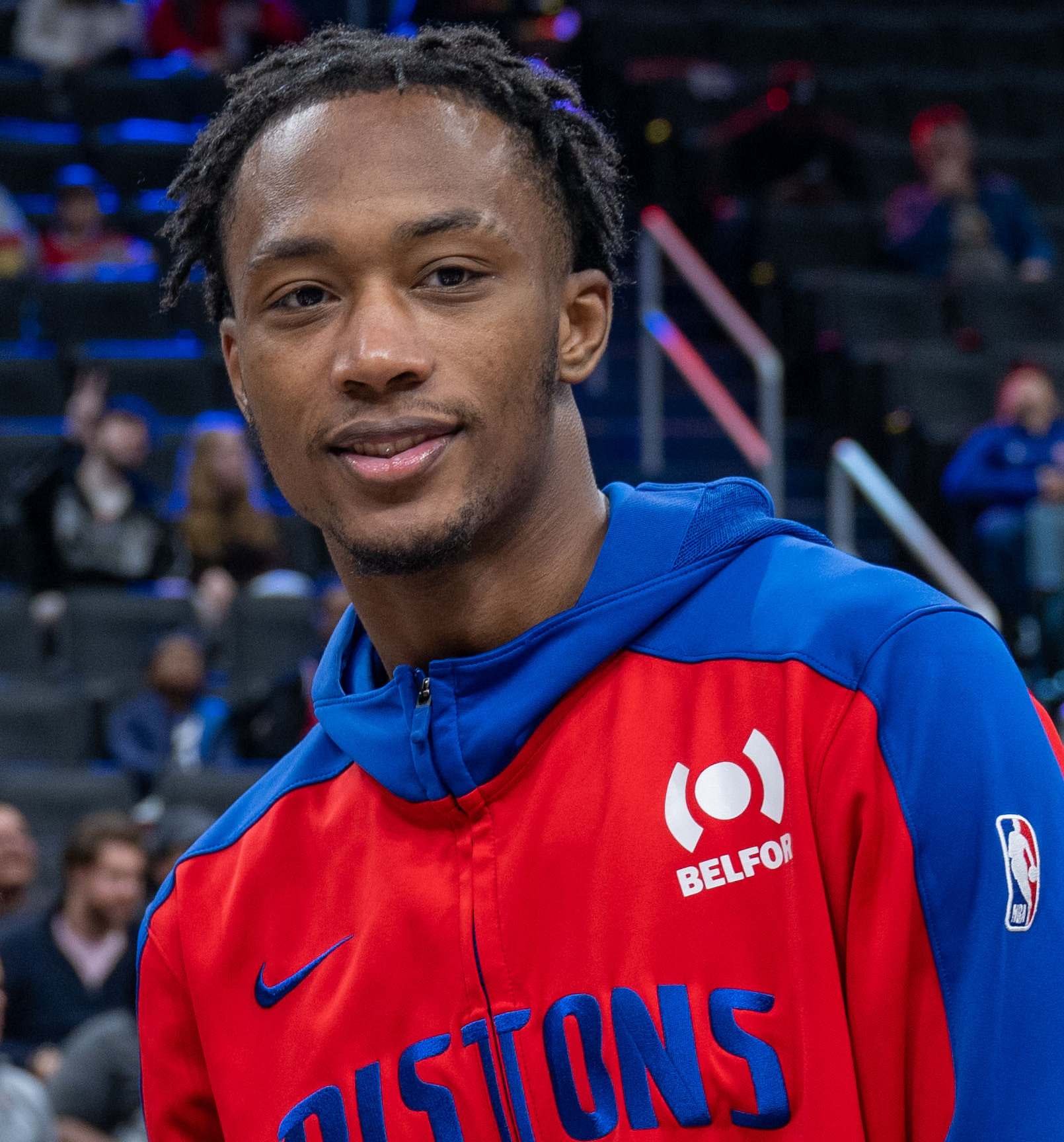
- Holland with the Detroit Pistons in 2024

No. 5 – Detroit Pistons
- Position: Small forward
- League: NBA

Personal information
- Born: July 7, 2005 (age 21) Duncanville, Texas, U.S.
- Listed height: 6 ft 8 in (2.03 m)
- Listed weight: 206 lb (93 kg)

Career information
- High school: Duncanville (Duncanville, Texas)
- NBA draft: 2024: 1st round, 5th overall pick
- Drafted by: Detroit Pistons
- Playing career: 2023–present

Career history
- 2023–2024: NBA G League Ignite
- 2024–present: Detroit Pistons

Career highlights
- NBA G League Next Up Game (2024); McDonald's All-American (2023)
- Stats at NBA.com
- Stats at Basketball Reference
Medals
Men's basketball
Representing United States
FIBA Under-17 Basketball World Cup
Gold medal – first place	2022 Spain	Team
FIBA Americas Under-16 Championship
Gold medal – first place	2021 Mexico	Team

Ronald Dewayne Holland II (born July 7, 2005), known as Hustleman, is an American professional basketball player for the Detroit Pistons of the National Basketball Association (NBA). A consensus five-star recruit, he ultimately chose to play for the NBA G League Ignite instead of playing collegiate basketball. One of the top players in the 2024 draft class, Holland was selected fifth overall by the Pistons in the 2024 NBA draft.

== Early life and high school career ==
Holland grew up in Duncanville, Texas and attended Duncanville High School.

As a freshman, Holland averaged 4.5 points, 3.5 rebounds and 0.5 assists per game. Duncanville High School won the state championship, their first since 2007. As a sophomore, Holland took a leap in stats and averaged 13.8 points and 10.1 rebounds per game, leading the Duncanville Panthers to win a second straight Texas Class 6A state championship.

As a junior, Holland led Duncanville to a 35–1 record and a third consecutive state championship while averaging 15.9 points, 7.9 rebounds, 2.9 assists and two steals per game. As a senior, Holland averaged 20.3 points, 10.1 rebounds, 2.4 assists and two steals per game while shooting 54.4 percent from the field and 79.3 percent from the free throw line to guide the Panthers to a 29–1 record.

Holland compiled over 1,500 points and 900 rebounds during his four years at Duncanville, helping the Panthers finish ranked nationally in all four seasons with a pair of state titles.

Holland was selected to play in the 2023 McDonald's All-American Boys Game during his senior year. He was also selected to play for Team USA in the Nike Hoops Summit.

=== Recruiting ===
Holland was a consensus five-star recruit and one of the top players in the 2023 class, according to major recruiting services. He was ranked as the best recruit in the state of Texas. On November 5, 2022, Holland committed to playing college basketball for Texas over offers from Kentucky, Memphis, Kansas, Arkansas, Oklahoma State, UCLA and Oregon. He initially reaffirmed his commitment after Texas head coach Chris Beard was fired in January 2023. However, Holland later requested a release from his National Letter of Intent (NLI) on April 28, 2023. Shortly after being released from his NLI, he announced that he would forgo playing college basketball and instead play professionally for NBA G League Ignite.

College recruiting
Name	Hometown	School	Height	Weight	Commit date
Ron Holland; PF	Duncanville, TX	Duncanville (TX)	6 ft 8 in (2.03 m)	200 lb (91 kg)	—
Ron Holland; PF	Recruit ratings: Rivals: 247Sports: ESPN: (94)				
Overall recruit ranking: Rivals: 5 247Sports: 1 ESPN: 2
Note: In many cases, Scout, Rivals, 247Sports, On3, and ESPN may conflict in their listings of height and weight.; In these cases, the average was taken. ESPN grades are on a 100-point scale.; Sources: "2023 Team Ranking". Rivals.

== Professional career ==
=== NBA G League Ignite (2023–2024) ===
On June 20, 2023, Holland signed a contract to join the NBA G League Ignite. He suffered a ruptured tendon in his right thumb on January 31, 2024, in a game against the Iowa Wolves and underwent season-ending surgery. Holland averaged 18.5 points, 6.7 rebounds, 2.8 assists and 2.1 steals per game in 29 games played. After the season, he entered the 2024 NBA draft.

=== Detroit Pistons (2024–present) ===
Holland was selected with the fifth overall pick by the Detroit Pistons in the 2024 NBA draft and on July 6, he signed with the Pistons.

Holland made his NBA debut on October 23, 2024, in a 115–109 loss to the Indiana Pacers, scoring 6 points.

== National team career ==
Holland played for the United States national under-16 team at the 2021 FIBA Under-16 Americas Championship. He was named to the All-Tournament team after averaging 19 points and 10.2 rebounds per game as the United States won the gold medal. The following summer, Holland played for the under-17 team at the 2022 FIBA Under-17 Basketball World Cup and averaged 11.1 points and 6.6 rebounds over seven games.

== Career statistics ==
Legend
GP	Games played	GS	Games started	MPG	Minutes per game
FG%	Field goal percentage	3P%	3-point field goal percentage	FT%	Free throw percentage
RPG	Rebounds per game	APG	Assists per game	SPG	Steals per game
BPG	Blocks per game	PPG	Points per game	**Bold**	Career high

=== NBA ===
==== Regular season ====
Year	Team	GP	GS	MPG	FG%	3P%	FT%	RPG	APG	SPG	BPG	PPG
2024–25	Detroit	**81**	2	15.6	**.474**	.238	.754	2.7	1.0	.6	.2	6.4
2025–26	Detroit	78	**5**	**19.9**	.432	**.253**	**.805**	**4.0**	**1.2**	**1.2**	**.3**	**8.2**
Career		159	7	17.7	.450	.246	.782	3.4	1.1	.9	.3	7.3

==== Playoffs ====
Year	Team	GP	GS	MPG	FG%	3P%	FT%	RPG	APG	SPG	BPG	PPG
2025	Detroit	5	0	**6.8**	.000	.000	**.900**	1.2	.0	.0	**.2**	**1.8**
2026	Detroit	**9**	0	6.4	**.308**	**.250**	.600	**1.6**	**.1**	**.4**	**.2**	1.4
Career		14	0	6.6	.222	.182	.800	1.4	.1	.3	.2	1.6

=== NBA G League ===
Year	Team	GP	GS	MPG	FG%	3P%	FT%	RPG	APG	SPG	BPG	PPG
2023–24	NBA G League	15	14	30.3	.474	.239	.682	6.7	2.8	2.1	1.1	18.5
Career		15	14	30.3	.474	.239	.682	6.7	2.8	2.1	1.1	18.5
