= 2021–22 Detroit Pistons season =

- Head coach: Dwane Casey
- General manager: Troy Weaver
- Owners: Tom Gores
- Arena: Little Caesars Arena

Results
- Record: 23–59 (.280)
- Place: Division: 5th (Central); Conference: 14th (Eastern)
- Playoff finish: Did not qualify
- Stats at Basketball Reference

Local media
- Television: Bally Sports Detroit
- Radio: WXYT

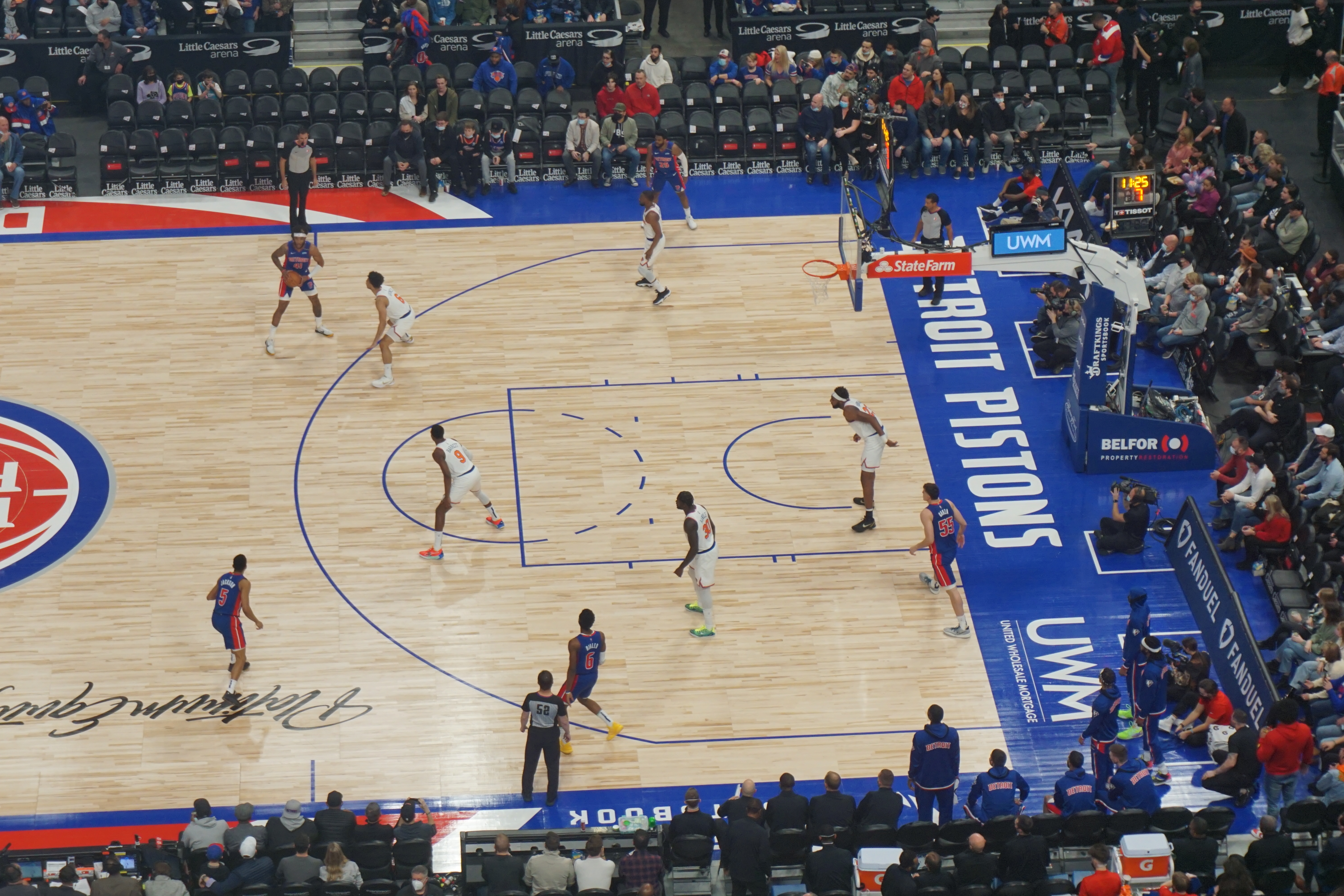
Detroit in action against the Knicks

The 2021–22 Detroit Pistons season was the 81st season of the franchise, the 74th in the National Basketball Association (NBA), and the fifth in Midtown Detroit. The Pistons attempted to improve on their record of 20–52 from last season. The Pistons held the first overall pick in the NBA draft for the first time since 1970. The Pistons finished at 23–59, missing the playoffs for the third consecutive season.

== Draft picks ==
Round	Pick	Player	Position	Nationality	College / Team
1	1	Cade Cunningham	Point guard	United States	Oklahoma State
2	37	JT Thor	Power forward	United States	Auburn
2	42	Isaiah Livers	Small forward	United States	Michigan
2	52	Luka Garza	Center	United States	Iowa

The Pistons held the first overall pick in the 2021 NBA draft, along with three acquired second-round picks entering the draft. Their original second-round pick was traded to the Philadelphia 76ers and was eventually used by the New York Knicks in the draft.

The 37th pick was later traded to the Charlotte Hornets in exchange for the draft rights to Balša Koprivica, the 57th pick.

== Roster ==
2021–22 Detroit Pistons roster
Players

Pos.	No.	Player	Height	Weight	DOB	From
F	41	Saddiq Bey	6 ft 7 in (2.01 m)	215 lb (98 kg)	1999-04-09	Villanova
G	2	Cade Cunningham	6 ft 6 in (1.98 m)	220 lb (100 kg)	2001-09-25	Oklahoma State
G	6	Hamidou Diallo	6 ft 5 in (1.96 m)	202 lb (92 kg)	1998-07-31	Kentucky
G	20	Carsen Edwards	5 ft 11 in (1.80 m)	200 lb (91 kg)	1998-03-12	Purdue
C	55	Luka Garza	6 ft 11 in (2.11 m)	265 lb (120 kg)	1998-12-27	Iowa
F	9	Jerami Grant	6 ft 9 in (2.06 m)	210 lb (95 kg)	1994-03-12	Syracuse
G	7	Killian Hayes	6 ft 5 in (1.96 m)	195 lb (88 kg)	2001-07-27	France
G	5	Frank Jackson	6 ft 3 in (1.91 m)	205 lb (93 kg)	1998-05-04	Duke
G	18	Cory Joseph	6 ft 3 in (1.91 m)	200 lb (91 kg)	1991-08-20	Texas
F	8	Braxton Key (TW)	6 ft 8 in (2.03 m)	225 lb (102 kg)	1997-02-14	Virginia
G	38	Saben Lee	6 ft 2 in (1.88 m)	183 lb (83 kg)	1999-06-23	Vanderbilt
F	12	Isaiah Livers	6 ft 6 in (1.98 m)	232 lb (105 kg)	1998-07-28	Michigan
G	17	Rodney McGruder	6 ft 4 in (1.93 m)	205 lb (93 kg)	1991-07-29	Kansas State
F/C	13	Kelly Olynyk	6 ft 11 in (2.11 m)	240 lb (109 kg)	1991-04-19	Gonzaga
F	24	Jamorko Pickett (TW)	6 ft 9 in (2.06 m)	206 lb (93 kg)	1997-12-24	Georgetown
C	28	Isaiah Stewart	6 ft 9 in (2.06 m)	250 lb (113 kg)	2001-05-22	Washington

Coaches
Head coach
- Dwane Casey
Assistant(s)
- Jerome Allen
- Bill Bayno
- Andrew Jones
- Rex Kalamian
- Jim Moran

Legend
- (DP) Unsigned draft pick
- (FA) Free agent
- (S) Suspended
- (GL) On assignment to G League affiliate
- (TW) Two-way affiliate player
- Injured

Roster
Updated: April 9, 2022

== Standings ==
=== Division ===
Central Division	W	L	PCT	GB	Home	Road	Div	GP
y – Milwaukee Bucks	51	31	.622	–	27‍–‍14	24‍–‍17	12–4	82
x – Chicago Bulls	46	36	.561	5.0	27‍–‍14	19‍–‍22	10–6	82
pi − Cleveland Cavaliers	44	38	.537	7.0	25‍–‍16	19‍–‍22	10–6	82
Indiana Pacers	25	57	.305	26.0	16‍–‍25	9‍–‍32	2–14	82
Detroit Pistons	23	59	.280	28.0	13‍–‍28	10‍–‍31	6–10	82

=== Conference ===
Eastern Conference
#	Team	W	L	PCT	GB	GP
1	c – Miami Heat *	53	29	.646	–	82
2	y – Boston Celtics *	51	31	.622	2.0	82
3	y – Milwaukee Bucks *	51	31	.622	2.0	82
4	x – Philadelphia 76ers	51	31	.622	2.0	82
5	x – Toronto Raptors	48	34	.585	5.0	82
6	x – Chicago Bulls	46	36	.561	7.0	82
7	x − Brooklyn Nets	44	38	.537	9.0	82
8	pi − Cleveland Cavaliers	44	38	.537	9.0	82
9	x − Atlanta Hawks	43	39	.524	10.0	82
10	pi − Charlotte Hornets	43	39	.524	10.0	82
11	New York Knicks	37	45	.451	16.0	82
12	Washington Wizards	35	47	.427	18.0	82
13	Indiana Pacers	25	57	.305	28.0	82
14	Detroit Pistons	23	59	.280	30.0	82
15	Orlando Magic	22	60	.268	31.0	82

== Game log ==
=== Preseason ===
2021 preseason game log
Total: 2–2 (Home: 2–0; Road: 0–2)
Preseason: 2–2 (home: 2–0; road: 0–2)

Game	Date	Team	Score	High points	High rebounds	High assists	Location Attendance	Record
1	October 6	San Antonio	W 115–105	Jerami Grant (19)	Isaiah Stewart (8)	Joseph & Olynyk (6)	Little Caesars Arena; 5,423	1–0
2	October 11	@ Memphis	L 92–127	Grant & Diallo (13)	Josh Jackson (6)	Josh Jackson (4)	FedExForum; 10,286	1–1
3	October 13	@ New York	L 100–108	Jerami Grant (18)	Isaiah Stewart (8)	Jackson & Lee (5)	Madison Square Garden; 11,226	1–2
4	October 15	Philadelphia	W 112–108	Jerami Grant (24)	Isaiah Stewart (12)	Saben Lee (8)	Little Caesars Arena; 7,623	2–2

2021–22 season schedule

=== Regular season ===
2021–22 game log
Total: 23–59 (Home: 13–28; Road: 10–31)
October: 1–5 (home: 1–1; road: 0–4)

Game	Date	Team	Score	High points	High rebounds	High assists	Location Attendance	Record
1	October 20	Chicago	L 88–94	Jerami Grant (28)	Saddiq Bey (9)	Saddiq Bey (4)	Little Caesars Arena; 20,088	0–1
2	October 23	@ Chicago	L 82–97	Saddiq Bey (20)	Saddiq Bey (16)	Hayes & Joseph (3)	United Center; 18,888	0–2
3	October 25	@ Atlanta	L 104–122	Bey & Olynyk (21)	Bey & Stewart (7)	Isaiah Stewart (5)	State Farm Arena; 14,209	0–3
4	October 28	@ Philadelphia	L 102–110	Saddiq Bey (19)	Bey & Grant (6)	Killian Hayes (4)	Wells Fargo Center; 20,017	0–4
5	October 30	Orlando	W 110–103	Jerami Grant (22)	Isaiah Stewart (8)	Cory Joseph (6)	Little Caesars Arena; 11,423	1–4
6	October 31	@ Brooklyn	L 91–117	Cory Joseph (13)	Josh Jackson (5)	Saddiq Bey (6)	Barclays Center; 13,507	1–5

November : 3–12 (home: 1–7; road: 2–5)

Game	Date	Team	Score	High points	High rebounds	High assists	Location Attendance	Record
7	November 2	Milwaukee	L 89–117	Jerami Grant (21)	Isaiah Stewart (8)	Killian Hayes (4)	Little Caesars Arena; 9,254	1–6
8	November 4	Philadelphia	L 98–109	Jerami Grant (27)	Cade Cunningham (10)	Cory Joseph (5)	Little Caesars Arena; 8,702	1–7
9	November 5	Brooklyn	L 90–96	Cade Cunningham (17)	Kelly Olynyk (10)	Cory Joseph (5)	Little Caesars Arena; 14,235	1–8
10	November 10	@ Houston	W 112–104	Jerami Grant (35)	Saddiq Bey (9)	Cory Joseph (5)	Toyota Center; 15,350	2–8
11	November 12	@ Cleveland	L 78–98	Jerami Grant (16)	Bey & Stewart (7)	Killian Hayes (5)	Rocket Mortgage FieldHouse; 17,095	2–9
12	November 13	@ Toronto	W 127–121	Jerami Grant (24)	Saddiq Bey (8)	Killian Hayes (10)	Scotiabank Arena; 19,800	3–9
13	November 15	Sacramento	L 107–129	Saddiq Bey (28)	Isaiah Stewart (15)	Cade Cunningham (8)	Little Caesars Arena; 10,092	3–10
14	November 17	Indiana	W 97–89	Jerami Grant (19)	Isaiah Stewart (11)	Cade Cunningham (6)	Little Caesars Arena; 11,457	4–10
15	November 19	Golden State	L 102–105	Frank Jackson (27)	Cade Cunningham (6)	Cade Cunningham (6)	Little Caesars Arena; 20,088	4–11
16	November 21	LA Lakers	L 116–121	Jerami Grant (36)	Cade Cunningham (12)	Cade Cunningham (10)	Little Caesars Arena; 15,532	4–12
17	November 23	Miami	L 92–100	Jerami Grant (21)	Trey Lyles (9)	Cory Joseph (9)	Little Caesars Arena; 13,123	4–13
18	November 24	@ Milwaukee	W 114–93	Trey Lyles (19)	Cade Cunningham (8)	Cade Cunningham (7)	Fiserv Forum; 17,341	4–14
19	November 26	@ LA Clippers	L 96–107	Jerami Grant (20)	Isaiah Stewart (12)	Cade Cunningham (6)	Staples Center; 18,139	4–15
20	November 28	@ LA Lakers	L 106–110	Jerami Grant (32)	Bey & Cunningham (11)	Killian Hayes (8)	Staples Center; 18,997	4–16
21	November 30	@ Portland	L 92–110	Cade Cunningham (26)	Isaiah Stewart (14)	Saddiq Bey (5)	Moda Center; 16,071	4–17

December : 1–11 (home: 1–5; road: 0–6)

Game	Date	Team	Score	High points	High rebounds	High assists	Location Attendance	Record
22	December 2	@ Phoenix	L 103–114	Jerami Grant (34)	Isaiah Stewart (14)	Cade Cunningham (5)	Footprint Center; 18,055	4–18
23	December 6	Oklahoma City	L 103–114	Cade Cunningham (28)	Cade Cunningham (11)	Cunningham, Grant & Hayes (5)	Little Caesars Arena; 10,522	4–19
24	December 8	Washington	L 116–119 (OT)	Jerami Grant (28)	Isaiah Stewart (10)	Cory Joseph (5)	Little Caesars Arena; 10,499	4–20
25	December 10	@ New Orleans	L 93–109	Trey Lyles (18)	Hamidou Diallo (7)	Killian Hayes (6)	Smoothie King Center; 15,828	4–21
26	December 12	Brooklyn	L 104–116	Cade Cunningham (26)	Isaiah Stewart (10)	Cunningham & Lee (6)	Little Caesars Arena; 15,289	4–22
—	December 14	@ Chicago	Postponed due to COVID-19 (Rescheduled: January 11)					
27	December 16	@ Indiana	L 113–122	Saddiq Bey (28)	Saddiq Bey (10)	Bey & Lee (5)	Gainbridge Fieldhouse; 13,596	4–23
28	December 18	Houston	L 107–116	Saddiq Bey (23)	Isaiah Stewart (8)	Cade Cunningham (11)	Little Caesars Arena; 13,722	4–24
29	December 19	Miami	W 100–90	Saddiq Bey (26)	Isaiah Stewart (14)	Cade Cunningham (10)	Little Caesars Arena; 15,188	5–24
30	December 21	@ New York	L 91–105	Saben Lee (16)	Isaiah Stewart (11)	Cade Cunningham (8)	Madison Square Garden; 17,906	5–25
31	December 23	@ Miami	L 112–115	Trey Lyles (28)	Saddiq Bey (10)	Cory Joseph (9)	FTX Arena; 19,600	5–26
32	December 26	@ San Antonio	L 109–144	Hamidou Diallo (28)	Cheick Diallo (9)	Derrick Walton (6)	AT&T Center; 14,715	5–27
33	December 29	New York	L 85–94	Saddiq Bey (32)	Cheick Diallo (13)	Derrick Walton (9)	Little Caesars Arena; 18,312	5–28

January : 7–9 (home: 5–2; road: 2–7)

Game	Date	Team	Score	High points	High rebounds	High assists	Location Attendance	Record
34	January 1	San Antonio	W 117–116 (OT)	Hamidou Diallo (34)	Saddiq Bey (17)	Derrick Walton (6)	Little Caesars Arena; 18,911	6–28
35	January 3	@ Milwaukee	W 115–106	Saddiq Bey (34)	Hamidou Diallo (9)	Cade Cunningham (7)	Fiserv Forum; 17,341	7–28
36	January 5	@ Charlotte	L 111–140	Trey Lyles (17)	Trey Lyles (7)	Cade Cunningham (7)	Spectrum Center; 14,427	7–29
37	January 6	@ Memphis	L 88–118	Saben Lee (14)	Isaiah Stewart (8)	Cade Cunningham (6)	FedExForum; 12,983	7–30
38	January 8	Orlando	W 97–92	Hamidou Diallo (17)	Trey Lyles (13)	Cunningham & Joseph (5)	Little Caesars Arena; 18,644	8–30
39	January 10	Utah	W 126–116	Bey & Cunningham (29)	Hamidou Diallo (8)	Cade Cunningham (8)	Little Caesars Arena; 17,834	9–30
40	January 11	@ Chicago	L 87–133	Josh Jackson (16)	Cunningham, Diallo & Stewart (7)	Killian Hayes (5)	United Center; 19,886	9–31
41	January 14	Toronto	W 103–87	Trey Lyles (21)	Cunningham & Lyles (7)	Cunningham & Hayes (5)	Little Caesars Arena; 18,011	10–31
42	January 16	Phoenix	L 108–135	Cunningham & Joseph (21)	Lyles & Stewart (6)	Cory Joseph (7)	Little Caesars Arena; 18,178	10–32
43	January 18	@ Golden State	L 86–102	Rodney McGruder (19)	Hamidou Diallo (13)	Cory Joseph (6)	Chase Center; 18,064	10–33
44	January 19	@ Sacramento	W 133–131	Saddiq Bey (30)	Kelly Olynyk (9)	Cory Joseph (9)	Golden 1 Center; 12,907	11–33
45	January 21	@ Utah	L 101–111	Cade Cunningham (25)	Isaiah Stewart (9)	Cunningham & Olynyk (5)	Vivint Arena; 18,306	11–34
46	January 23	@ Denver	L 111–117	Cunningham, Lyles & Stewart (18)	Saddiq Bey (7)	Cade Cunningham (8)	Ball Arena; 14,060	11–35
47	January 25	Denver	L 105–110	Cade Cunningham (34)	Cade Cunningham (8)	Cunningham & Hayes (8)	Little Caesars Arena; 16,023	11–36
48	January 28	@ Orlando	L 103–119	Trey Lyles (18)	Isaiah Stewart (8)	Killian Hayes (6)	Amway Center; 13,156	11–37
49	January 30	Cleveland	W 115–105	Saddiq Bey (31)	Isaiah Stewart (12)	Cade Cunningham (10)	Little Caesars Arena; 16,811	12–37

February : 3–9 (home: 1–6; road: 2–3)

Game	Date	Team	Score	High points	High rebounds	High assists	Location Attendance	Record
50	February 1	New Orleans	L 101–111	Cory Joseph (18)	Isaiah Stewart (11)	Kelly Olynyk (6)	Little Caesars Arena; 15,499	12–38
51	February 3	Minnesota	L 117–128	Frank Jackson (25)	Bey & Stewart (13)	Saddiq Bey (8)	Little Caesars Arena; 15,523	12–39
52	February 4	Boston	L 93–102	Bey & Diallo (21)	Isaiah Stewart (17)	Killian Hayes (5)	Little Caesars Arena; 17,584	12–40
53	February 6	@ Minnesota	L 105–118	Saddiq Bey (24)	Isaiah Stewart (12)	Killian Hayes (8)	Target Center; 16,487	12–41
54	February 8	@ Dallas	L 86–116	Hamidou Diallo (18)	Isaiah Stewart (15)	Saddiq Bey (6)	American Airlines Center; 19,200	12–42
55	February 10	Memphis	L 107–132	Jerami Grant (20)	Hamidou Diallo (10)	Cory Joseph (9)	Little Caesars Arena; 18,744	12–43
56	February 11	Charlotte	L 119–141	Saddiq Bey (25)	Isaiah Stewart (12)	Killian Hayes (12)	Little Caesars Arena; 20,088	12–44
57	February 14	@ Washington	L 94–103	Saddiq Bey (24)	Isaiah Stewart (9)	Saddiq Bey (5)	Capital One Arena; 10,793	12–45
58	February 16	@ Boston	W 112–111	Jerami Grant (24)	Saddiq Bey (11)	Bey & Cunningham (6)	TD Garden; 19,156	13–45
All-Star Break
59	February 24	Cleveland	W 106–103	Hamidou Diallo (21)	Isaiah Stewart (8)	Cade Cunningham (6)	Little Caesars Arena; 15,622	14–45
60	February 26	Boston	L 104–113	Cade Cunningham (25)	Isaiah Stewart (10)	Killian Hayes (4)	Little Caesars Arena; 19,122	14–46
61	February 27	@ Charlotte	W 127–126 (OT)	Saddiq Bey (28)	Isaiah Stewart (11)	Killian Hayes (7)	Spectrum Center; 15,348	15–46

March : 6–10 (home: 4–5; road: 2–5)

Game	Date	Team	Score	High points	High rebounds	High assists	Location Attendance	Record
62	March 1	@ Washington	L 113–116	Jerami Grant (26)	Cunningham & Stewart (9)	Cunningham & Hayes (5)	Capital One Arena; 12,122	15–47
63	March 3	@ Toronto	W 108–106	Jerami Grant (26)	Cade Cunningham (12)	Cory Joseph (6)	Scotiabank Arena; 19,548	16–47
64	March 4	Indiana	W 111–106	Saddiq Bey (25)	Isaiah Stewart (13)	Jerami Grant (5)	Little Caesars Arena; 17,244	17–47
65	March 7	Atlanta	W 113–110 (OT)	Cade Cunningham (28)	Marvin Bagley III (10)	Cade Cunningham (10)	Little Caesars Arena; 14,942	18–47
66	March 9	Chicago	L 108–114	Cade Cunningham (22)	Marvin Bagley III (6)	Bey & Cunningham (6)	Little Caesars Arena; 18,022	18–48
67	March 11	@ Boston	L 103–114	Cade Cunningham (27)	Marvin Bagley III (11)	Bey, Cunningham & Joseph (6)	TD Garden; 19,156	18–49
68	March 13	LA Clippers	L 102–106	Cade Cunningham (23)	Cade Cunningham (9)	Cade Cunningham (10)	Little Caesars Arena; 19,313	18–50
69	March 15	@ Miami	L 98–105	Jerami Grant (22)	Isaiah Stewart (8)	Killian Hayes (8)	FTX Arena; 19,600	18–51
70	March 17	@ Orlando	W 134–120	Saddiq Bey (51)	Marvin Bagley III (11)	Joseph & Lee (7)	Amway Center; 14,369	19–51
71	March 19	@ Cleveland	L 109–113	Jerami Grant (40)	Isaiah Stewart (12)	Cade Cunningham (10)	Rocket Mortgage FieldHouse; 19,432	19–52
72	March 21	Portland	L 115–119	Bey & Cunningham (25)	Isaiah Stewart (13)	Cade Cunningham (7)	Little Caesars Arena; 14,923	19–53
73	March 23	Atlanta	W 122–101	Jerami Grant (21)	Isaiah Stewart (10)	Cade Cunningham (8)	Little Caesars Arena; 16,212	20–53
74	March 25	Washington	L 97–100	Marvin Bagley III (25)	Isaiah Stewart (8)	Cade Cunningham (9)	Little Caesars Arena; 18,943	20–54
75	March 27	New York	L 102–104	Marvin Bagley III (27)	Isaiah Stewart (10)	Cade Cunningham (7)	Little Caesars Arena; 19,304	20–55
76	March 29	@ Brooklyn	L 123–130	Cade Cunningham (34)	Isaiah Stewart (11)	Kelly Olynyk (8)	Barclays Center; 17,559	20–56
77	March 31	Philadelphia	W 102–94	Cade Cunningham (27)	Isaiah Stewart (12)	Cade Cunningham (6)	Little Caesars Arena; 20,023	21–56

April : 2–3 (home: 0–2; road: 2–1)

Game	Date	Team	Score	High points	High rebounds	High assists	Location Attendance	Record
78	April 1	@ Oklahoma City	W 110–101	Hayes & Jackson (26)	Isaiah Livers (11)	Saben Lee (12)	Paycom Center; 16,961	22–56
79	April 3	@ Indiana	W 121–117	Saddiq Bey (31)	Braxton Key (9)	Carsen Edwards (9)	Gainbridge Fieldhouse; 17,407	23–56
80	April 6	Dallas	L 113–131	Cade Cunningham (25)	Isaiah Stewart (14)	Cade Cunningham (9)	Little Caesars Arena; 18,422	23–57
81	April 8	Milwaukee	L 101–131	Rodney McGruder (26)	Isaiah Stewart (12)	Cade Cunningham (7)	Little Caesars Arena; 22,088	23–58
82	April 10	@ Philadelphia	L 106–118	Luka Garza (20)	Luka Garza (10)	Saben Lee (8)	Wells Fargo Center; 21,459	23–59

2021–22 season schedule

== Player statistics ==
Legend
GP	Games played	GS	Games started	MPG	Minutes per game
FG%	Field-goal percentage	3P%	3-point field-goal percentage	FT%	Free-throw percentage
RPG	Rebounds per game	APG	Assists per game	SPG	Steals per game
BPG	Blocks per game	PPG	Points per game

=== Regular season ===
Detroit Pistons statistics
Player	GP	GS	MPG	FG%	3P%	FT%	RPG	APG	SPG	BPG	PPG
Saddiq Bey	82	82	33.0	.396	.346	.827	5.4	2.8	.9	.2	16.1
Isaiah Stewart	71	71	25.6	.510	.326	.718	8.7	1.2	.3	1.1	8.3
Killian Hayes	66	40	25.0	.383	.263	.770	3.2	4.2	1.2	.5	6.9
Cory Joseph	65	39	24.6	.445	.414	.885	2.7	3.6	.6	.3	8.0
Cade Cunningham	64	64	32.6	.416	.314	.845	5.5	5.6	1.2	.7	17.4
Hamidou Diallo	58	29	21.9	.496	.247	.650	4.8	1.3	1.2	.3	11.0
Frank Jackson	53	7	22.0	.402	.308	.827	1.6	1.0	.5	.2	10.6
Trey Lyles^{†}	51	3	19.4	.456	.301	.784	4.8	1.1	.4	.5	10.4
Rodney McGruder	51	2	14.8	.436	.397	.731	2.2	.9	.4	.1	5.4
Jerami Grant	47	47	31.9	.426	.358	.838	4.1	2.4	.9	1.0	19.2
Kelly Olynyk	40	1	19.1	.448	.336	.775	4.4	2.8	.8	.5	9.1
Josh Jackson^{†}	39	3	18.1	.410	.265	.714	3.2	1.3	.5	.5	7.1
Saben Lee	37	0	16.3	.390	.233	.789	2.4	2.9	1.0	.3	5.6
Luka Garza	32	5	12.2	.449	.327	.623	3.1	.6	.3	.2	5.8
Isaiah Livers	19	5	20.2	.456	.422	.857	3.0	1.1	.7	.4	6.4
Marvin Bagley III^{†}	18	8	27.2	.555	.229	.593	6.8	1.1	.7	.4	14.6
Jamorko Pickett	13	0	13.5	.360	.333	.500	2.5	.5	.0	.5	3.8
Cassius Stanley	9	1	17.2	.413	.235	1.000	2.1	.4	.6	.2	5.8
Braxton Key^{†}	9	0	21.2	.457	.300	.538	5.3	1.1	1.0	1.2	8.6
Justin Robinson^{†}	5	0	18.2	.321	.381	.333	1.4	1.8	.2	.2	5.6
Carsen Edwards	4	0	19.8	.300	.250	1.000	1.5	3.5	.5	.0	5.8
Derrick Walton	3	3	36.0	.231	.231	1.000	3.3	7.0	2.3	1.3	6.3
Micah Potter	3	0	10.3	.455	.000	1.000	3.0	.0	.3	.3	4.0
Cheick Diallo	3	0	10.3	.375		.833	4.0	.0	.3	.0	3.7
Deividas Sirvydis	3	0	9.0	.100	.143		2.0	.3	1.0	.3	1.0
Trayvon Palmer	1	0	17.0	.000			2.0	.0	.0	.0	.0
Jaysean Paige	1	0	7.0	.000	.000		1.0	1.0	.0	.0	.0

- ^{†} Denotes player spent time with another team in the season. Stats reflect time with the Pistons only.

== Transactions ==
=== Overview ===
Players Added

Via draft

- Cade Cunningham
- Luka Garza
- Isaiah Livers

Via trade

- Marvin Bagley III
- DeAndre Jordan
- Balša Koprivica

Via free agency

- Jared Cunningham
- Carsen Edwards
- Cory Joseph
- Braxton Key
- Trey Lyles
- Rodney McGruder
- Kelly Olynyk
- Jamorko Pickett
- Chris Smith
- Cassius Stanley
- Anthony Tarke
- Derrick Walton
Players Lost

Via trade

- Sekou Doumbouya
- Josh Jackson
- Trey Lyles
- Jahlil Okafor
- Mason Plumlee
- JT Thor

Via free agency

- Wayne Ellington
- Dennis Smith Jr.

Waived

- Tyler Cook
- Jared Cunningham
- DeAndre Jordan
- Cory Joseph
- Rodney McGruder
- Deividas Sirvydis
- Chris Smith
- Cassius Stanley
- Anthony Tarke
- Derrick Walton

=== Trades ===
August 6, 2021	To Detroit Pistons Draft rights to Balša Koprivica	To Charlotte Hornets Mason Plumlee; Draft rights to JT Thor
September 4, 2021	To Detroit Pistons DeAndre Jordan; 2022 second-round draft pick 2024 second-round draft pick (from Washington via Brooklyn); 2025 second-round draft pick (from Golden State via Brooklyn); 2027 second-round draft pick Cash considerations	To Brooklyn Nets Sekou Doumbouya; Jahlil Okafor
February 10, 2022	Four-team trade
February 10, 2022	To Milwaukee Bucks Serge Ibaka (from Los Angeles); Two future second-round picks (from Sacramento and Detroit); Cash considerations (from Los Angeles)	To Los Angeles Clippers Rodney Hood (from Milwaukee); Semi Ojeleye (from Milwaukee)
February 10, 2022	To Sacramento Kings Donte DiVincenzo (from Milwaukee); Josh Jackson (from Detroit); Trey Lyles (from Detroit)	To Detroit Pistons Marvin Bagley III (from Sacramento)

=== Free agency ===
==== Re-signed ====
Date	Player	Contract terms	Ref.
August 6	Saben Lee	3-year contract	
August 11	Frank Jackson	2-year contract	
August 11	Cory Joseph	2-year contract worth $10 million	
August 11	Rodney McGruder	1-year contract	
August 19	Hamidou Diallo	2-year contract worth $10.4 million	

==== Additions ====
Date	Player	Contract terms	Former team	Ref.
August 6	Trey Lyles	2-year contract worth $5 million	San Antonio Spurs	
August 6	Kelly Olynyk	3-year contract worth $37 million	Houston Rockets	
August 17	Chris Smith	Two-way contract	UCLA Bruins	
September 22	Anthony Tarke	Exhibit 10 contract	Coppin State Eagles	
September 24	Jamorko Pickett	Two-way contract	Georgetown Hoyas	
September 28	Cassius Stanley	Exhibit 10 contract	Indiana Pacers	
September 28	Derrick Walton	Exhibit 10 contract	(France) ASVEL	
September 29	Jared Cunningham	Exhibit 10 contract	(Israel) Bnei Herzliya	
March 24	Braxton Key	10-day contract	Delaware Blue Coats	
April 3	Carsen Edwards	2-year contract	Salt Lake City Stars	

==== Subtractions ====
Date	Player	Reason	New team	Ref.
July 31	Tyler Cook	Waived	Chicago Bulls	
July 31	Cory Joseph	Waived	—N/a	
August 6	Wayne Ellington	Unrestricted free agent	Los Angeles Lakers	
August 6	Rodney McGruder	Waived	—N/a	
September 7	DeAndre Jordan	Waived	Los Angeles Lakers	
September 23	Dennis Smith Jr.	Unrestricted free agent	Portland Trail Blazers	
September 27	Anthony Tarke	Waived	Motor City Cruise	
September 29	Deividas Sirvydis	Waived	Motor City Cruise	
October 16	Jared Cunningham	Waived	Motor City Cruise	
October 16	Cassius Stanley	Waived	Motor City Cruise	
October 16	Derrick Walton	Waived	Motor City Cruise	
April 3	Chris Smith	Waived	—N/a	
