= 2020–21 Detroit Pistons season =

Season of National Basketball Association team the Detroit Pistons

- Head coach: Dwane Casey
- General manager: Troy Weaver
- Owner: Tom Gores
- Arena: Little Caesars Arena

Results
- Record: 20–52 (.278)
- Place: Division: 5th (Central); Conference: 15th (Eastern)
- Playoff finish: Did not qualify
- Stats at Basketball Reference

Local media
- Television: Bally Sports Detroit (Note: Formerly Fox Sports Detroit until March 31, 2021.)
- Radio: WXYT

The 2020–21 Detroit Pistons season was the 80th season of the franchise, the 73rd in the National Basketball Association (NBA), and the fourth in Midtown Detroit. This was the third season under head coach Dwane Casey. On June 18, 2020, the Pistons hired Troy Weaver as their new general manager. The Pistons finished with the worst record in the Eastern Conference, missing the playoffs for a second consecutive season.

== Draft picks ==
Round	Pick	Player	Position	Nationality	College / Team
1	7	Killian Hayes	Point guard	France	ratiopharm Ulm
1	16	Isaiah Stewart	Power forward / center	United States	Washington
1	19	Saddiq Bey	Small forward	United States	Villanova

The Pistons held one first-round pick entering the draft. They acquired the draft rights to the 16th overall pick from the Houston Rockets, the 19th overall pick from the Brooklyn Nets, and the 38th overall pick from the Utah Jazz.

== Roster ==
2020–21 Detroit Pistons roster
Players

Pos.	No.	Player	Height	Weight	DOB	From
F	41	Saddiq Bey	6 ft 7 in (2.01 m)	215 lb (98 kg)	1999-04-09	Villanova
F	25	Tyler Cook	6 ft 8 in (2.03 m)	255 lb (116 kg)	1997-09-23	Iowa
G	6	Hamidou Diallo	6 ft 5 in (1.96 m)	202 lb (92 kg)	1998-07-31	Kentucky
F	45	Sekou Doumbouya	6 ft 8 in (2.03 m)	230 lb (104 kg)	2000-12-23	France
G	8	Wayne Ellington	6 ft 4 in (1.93 m)	207 lb (94 kg)	1987-11-29	North Carolina
F	9	Jerami Grant	6 ft 8 in (2.03 m)	210 lb (95 kg)	1994-03-12	Syracuse
G	7	Killian Hayes	6 ft 5 in (1.96 m)	195 lb (88 kg)	2001-07-27	France
G	5	Frank Jackson (TW)	6 ft 3 in (1.91 m)	205 lb (93 kg)	1998-05-04	Duke
G/F	20	Josh Jackson	6 ft 8 in (2.03 m)	207 lb (94 kg)	1997-02-10	Kansas
G	18	Cory Joseph	6 ft 3 in (1.91 m)	200 lb (91 kg)	1991-08-20	Texas
G	38	Saben Lee (TW)	6 ft 2 in (1.88 m)	183 lb (83 kg)	1999-06-23	Vanderbilt
G	17	Rodney McGruder	6 ft 4 in (1.93 m)	205 lb (93 kg)	1991-07-29	Kansas State
C	13	Jahlil Okafor (injured)	6 ft 11 in (2.11 m)	270 lb (122 kg)	1995-12-15	Duke
C	24	Mason Plumlee	7 ft 0 in (2.13 m)	255 lb (116 kg)	1990-03-05	Duke
G	91	Deividas Sirvydis	6 ft 8 in (2.03 m)	190 lb (86 kg)	2000-06-10	Lithuania
G	0	Dennis Smith Jr.	6 ft 2 in (1.88 m)	205 lb (93 kg)	1997-11-25	NC State
F/C	28	Isaiah Stewart	6 ft 9 in (2.06 m)	250 lb (113 kg)	2001-05-22	Washington

Coaches
Head coach
- Dwane Casey
Assistant(s)
- Sidney Lowe
- Micah Nori
- Sean Sweeney

Legend
- (DP) Unsigned draft pick
- (FA) Free agent
- (S) Suspended
- (GL) On assignment to G League affiliate
- (TW) Two-way affiliate player
- Injured

Roster
Updated: May 12, 2021

== Standings ==
=== Division ===
Central Division	W	L	PCT	GB	Home	Road	Div	GP
y – Milwaukee Bucks	46	26	.639	–	26‍–‍10	20‍–‍16	11–1	72
pi – Indiana Pacers	34	38	.472	12.0	13‍–‍23	21‍–‍15	7–5	72
Chicago Bulls	31	41	.431	15.0	15‍–‍21	16‍–‍20	7–5	72
Cleveland Cavaliers	22	50	.306	24.0	13‍–‍23	9‍–‍27	4–8	72
Detroit Pistons	20	52	.278	26.0	13‍–‍23	7‍–‍29	1–11	72

=== Conference ===
Eastern Conference
#	Team	W	L	PCT	GB	GP
1	c − Philadelphia 76ers *	49	23	.681	–	72
2	x – Brooklyn Nets	48	24	.667	1.0	72
3	y – Milwaukee Bucks *	46	26	.639	3.0	72
4	x – New York Knicks	41	31	.569	8.0	72
5	y – Atlanta Hawks *	41	31	.569	8.0	72
6	x – Miami Heat	40	32	.556	9.0	72
7	x – Boston Celtics	36	36	.500	13.0	72
8	x – Washington Wizards	34	38	.472	15.0	72
9	pi – Indiana Pacers	34	38	.472	15.0	72
10	pi – Charlotte Hornets	33	39	.458	16.0	72
11	Chicago Bulls	31	41	.431	18.0	72
12	Toronto Raptors	27	45	.375	22.0	72
13	Cleveland Cavaliers	22	50	.306	27.0	72
14	Orlando Magic	21	51	.292	28.0	72
15	Detroit Pistons	20	52	.278	29.0	72

Notes

- z – Clinched home court advantage for the entire playoffs
- c – Clinched home court advantage for the conference playoffs
- y – Clinched division title
- x – Clinched playoff spot
- * – Division leader

== Game log ==
=== Preseason ===
2020 preseason game log
Total: 2–2 (Home: 1–1; Road: 1–1)
Preseason: 2–2 (home: 1–1; road: 1–1)

Game	Date	Team	Score	High points	High rebounds	High assists	Location Attendance	Record
1	December 11	New York	L 84–90	Bey & Mykhailiuk (14)	Blake Griffin (7)	Blake Griffin (5)	Little Caesars Arena	0–1
2	December 13	New York	W 99–91	Sekou Doumbouya (23)	Griffin & Okafor (6)	Derrick Rose (8)	Little Caesars Arena	1–1
3	December 17	@ Washington	W 97–86	Josh Jackson (17)	Josh Jackson (7)	Derrick Rose (6)	Capital One Arena	2–1
4	December 19	@ Washington	L 96–99	Grant & Rose (14)	Jerami Grant (9)	Blake Griffin (3)	Capital One Arena	2–2

2020–21 season schedule

=== Regular season ===
2020–21 game log
Total: 20–52 (Home: 13–23; Road: 7–29)
December: 0–4 (home: 0–2; road: 0–2)

Game	Date	Team	Score	High points	High rebounds	High assists	Location Attendance	Record
1	December 23	@ Minnesota	L 101–111	Josh Jackson (19)	Sekou Doumbouya (9)	Plumlee & Rose (6)	Target Center; 0	0–1
2	December 26	Cleveland	L 119–128 (2OT)	Jerami Grant (28)	Jerami Grant (10)	Mason Plumlee (5)	Little Caesars Arena; 0	0–2
3	December 28	@ Atlanta	L 120–128	Grant & Jackson (27)	Mason Plumlee (12)	Killian Hayes (8)	State Farm Arena; 0	0–3
4	December 29	Golden State	L 106–116	Jerami Grant (27)	Mason Plumlee (10)	Derrick Rose (7)	Little Caesars Arena; 0	0–4

January : 5–11 (home: 4–5; road: 1–6)

Game	Date	Team	Score	High points	High rebounds	High assists	Location Attendance	Record
5	January 1	Boston	W 96–93	Jerami Grant (24)	Mason Plumlee (17)	Killian Hayes (6)	Little Caesars Arena; 0	1–4
6	January 3	Boston	L 120–122	Jerami Grant (22)	Mason Plumlee (8)	Derrick Rose (8)	Little Caesars Arena; 0	1–5
7	January 4	@ Milwaukee	L 115–125	Jerami Grant (24)	Mason Plumlee (8)	Mason Plumlee (6)	Fiserv Forum; 0	1–6
8	January 6	@ Milwaukee	L 115–130	Jerami Grant (31)	Saddiq Bey (10)	Blake Griffin (5)	Fiserv Forum; 0	1–7
9	January 8	Phoenix	W 110–105	Jerami Grant (31)	Saddiq Bey (12)	Delon Wright (6)	Little Caesars Arena; 0	2–7
10	January 10	Utah	L 86–96	Jerami Grant (28)	Mason Plumlee (8)	Blake Griffin (5)	Little Caesars Arena; 0	2–8
11	January 13	Milwaukee	L 101–110	Jerami Grant (22)	Mason Plumlee (13)	Delon Wright (7)	Little Caesars Arena; 0	2–9
—	January 15	Washington	Postponed due to COVID-19 (makeup date: April 1)					
12	January 16	@ Miami	W 120–100	Jerami Grant (24)	Isaiah Stewart (11)	Delon Wright (10)	American Airlines Arena; 0	3–9
13	January 18	@ Miami	L 107–113	Jerami Grant (27)	Mason Plumlee (7)	Jerami Grant (6)	American Airlines Arena; 0	3–10
14	January 20	@ Atlanta	L 115–123 (OT)	Jerami Grant (32)	Mason Plumlee (9)	Jerami Grant (5)	State Farm Arena; 0	3–11
15	January 22	Houston	L 102–103	Jerami Grant (21)	Griffin & Stewart (10)	Mason Plumlee (4)	Little Caesars Arena; 0	3–12
16	January 23	Philadelphia	L 110–114	Wayne Ellington (17)	Jerami Grant (9)	Delon Wright (6)	Little Caesars Arena; 0	3–13
17	January 25	Philadelphia	W 119–104	Delon Wright (28)	Mason Plumlee (10)	Delon Wright (9)	Little Caesars Arena; 0	4–13
18	January 27	@ Cleveland	L 107–122	Jerami Grant (26)	Mason Plumlee (12)	Delon Wright (7)	Rocket Mortgage FieldHouse; 1,944	4–14
19	January 28	L. A. Lakers	W 107–92	Blake Griffin (23)	Mason Plumlee (10)	Grant, Griffin & Wright (6)	Little Caesars Arena; 0	5–14
20	January 30	@ Golden State	L 91–118	Jerami Grant (18)	Jackson & Wright (6)	Delon Wright (4)	Chase Center; 0	5–15

February : 4–10 (home: 2–3; road: 2–7)

Game	Date	Team	Score	High points	High rebounds	High assists	Location Attendance	Record
—	February 1	@ Denver	Postponed due to COVID-19 (makeup date: April 6)					
21	February 2	@ Utah	L 105–117	Jerami Grant (27)	Mason Plumlee (14)	Jerami Grant (4)	Vivint Arena; 3,902	5–16
22	February 5	@ Phoenix	L 92–109	Jerami Grant (21)	Isaiah Stewart (10)	Delon Wright (6)	Phoenix Suns Arena; 0	5–17
23	February 6	@ L. A. Lakers	L 129–135 (2OT)	Jerami Grant (32)	Mason Plumlee (8)	Delon Wright (10)	Staples Center; 0	5–18
24	February 9	Brooklyn	W 122–111	Jerami Grant (32)	Mason Plumlee (12)	Delon Wright (9)	Little Caesars Arena; 0	6–18
25	February 11	Indiana	L 95–111	Josh Jackson (18)	Josh Jackson (8)	Blake Griffin (6)	Little Caesars Arena; 0	6–19
26	February 12	@ Boston	W 108–102	Saddiq Bey (30)	Saddiq Bey (12)	Delon Wright (7)	TD Garden; 0	7–19
27	February 14	New Orleans	W 123–112	Josh Jackson (21)	Mason Plumlee (10)	Mason Plumlee (10)	Little Caesars Arena; 0	8–19
—	February 16	San Antonio	Postponed due to COVID-19 (makeup date: March 15)					
—	February 17	@ Dallas	Postponed due to winter storm (makeup date: April 21)					
28	February 17	@ Chicago	L 102–105	Jerami Grant (43)	Mason Plumlee (8)	Delon Wright (4)	United Center; 0	8–20
29	February 19	@ Memphis	L 95–109	Grant & Wright (16)	Mason Plumlee (15)	Mason Plumlee (6)	FedExForum; 1,795	8–21
30	February 21	@ Orlando	L 96–105	Jerami Grant (24)	Josh Jackson (10)	Saben Lee (5)	Amway Center; 4,002	8–22
31	February 23	@ Orlando	W 105–93	Saben Lee (21)	Mason Plumlee (12)	Jerami Grant (6)	Amway Center; 3,631	9–22
32	February 24	@ New Orleans	L 118–128	Josh Jackson (25)	Isaiah Stewart (10)	Plumlee & Smith Jr. (7)	Smoothie King Center; 2,700	9–23
33	February 26	Sacramento	L 107–110	Jerami Grant (30)	Isaiah Stewart (11)	Plumlee & Smith Jr. (6)	Little Caesars Arena; 0	9–24
34	February 28	New York	L 90–109	Jerami Grant (21)	Isaiah Stewart (10)	Saben Lee (4)	Little Caesars Arena; 0	9–25

March : 4–9 (home: 2–4; road: 2–5)

Game	Date	Team	Score	High points	High rebounds	High assists	Location Attendance	Record
—	March 2	@ Toronto	Postponed due to COVID-19 (makeup date: March 3)					
35	March 3	@ Toronto	W 129–105	Wayne Ellington (25)	Dennis Smith Jr. (12)	Dennis Smith Jr. (11)	Amalie Arena; 0	10–25
36	March 4	@ New York	L 104–114	Wayne Ellington (17)	Mason Plumlee (13)	Sviatoslav Mykhailiuk (5)	Madison Square Garden; 1,981	10–26
All-Star Break
37	March 11	@ Charlotte	L 102–105	Jerami Grant (32)	Grant, Plumlee & Stewart (8)	Sviatoslav Mykhailiuk (8)	Spectrum Center; 0	10–27
38	March 13	@ Brooklyn	L 95–100	Jerami Grant (22)	Mason Plumlee (9)	Mason Plumlee (6)	Barclays Center; 1,364	10–28
39	March 15	San Antonio	L 99–109	Josh Jackson (15)	Mason Plumlee (12)	Delon Wright (8)	Little Caesars Arena; 0	10–29
40	March 17	Toronto	W 116–112	Saddiq Bey (28)	Mason Plumlee (14)	Delon Wright (8)	Little Caesars Arena; 750	11–29
41	March 19	@ Houston	W 113–100	Frank Jackson (23)	Mason Plumlee (16)	Delon Wright (8)	Toyota Center; 3,061	12–29
42	March 21	Chicago	L 86–100	Jerami Grant (26)	Mason Plumlee (10)	Dennis Smith Jr. (5)	Little Caesars Arena; 750	12–30
43	March 24	@ Indiana	L 111–116	Jerami Grant (29)	Mason Plumlee (10)	Jackson & Smith Jr. (5)	Bankers Life Fieldhouse; 0	12–31
44	March 26	Brooklyn	L 111–113	Jerami Grant (19)	Mason Plumlee (10)	Mason Plumlee (5)	Little Caesars Arena; 750	12–32
45	March 27	@ Washington	L 92–106	Wayne Ellington (15)	Plumlee & Stewart (8)	Cory Joseph (4)	Capital One Arena; 0	12–33
46	March 29	Toronto	W 118–104	Bey, Lee & Diallo (19)	Hamidou Diallo (10)	Lee & Joseph (5)	Little Caesars Arena; 750	13–33
47	March 31	Portland	L 101–124	Jerami Grant (30)	Hamidou Diallo (7)	Cory Joseph (9)	Little Caesars Arena; 750	13–34

April : 6–10 (home: 4–3; road: 2–7)

Game	Date	Team	Score	High points	High rebounds	High assists	Location Attendance	Record
48	April 1	Washington	W 120–91	Josh Jackson (31)	Mason Plumlee (11)	Plumlee & Joseph (7)	Little Caesars Arena; 750	14–34
49	April 3	New York	L 81–125	Jerami Grant (16)	Mason Plumlee (10)	Jackson, Lee & Hayes (3)	Little Caesars Arena; 750	14–35
50	April 5	@ Oklahoma City	W 132–108	Jerami Grant (21)	Hamidou Diallo (8)	Killian Hayes (7)	Chesapeake Energy Arena; 0	15–35
51	April 6	@ Denver	L 119–134	Jerami Grant (29)	Isaiah Stewart (8)	Saben Lee (7)	Ball Arena; 3,556	15–36
52	April 8	@ Sacramento	W 113–101	Cory Joseph (24)	Isaiah Stewart (13)	Cory Joseph (7)	Golden 1 Center; 0	16–36
53	April 10	@ Portland	L 103–118	Josh Jackson (21)	Bey & Plumlee (6)	Cory Joseph (8)	Moda Center; 0	16–37
54	April 11	@ L. A. Clippers	L 124–131	Josh Jackson (26)	Isaiah Stewart (6)	Cory Joseph (13)	Staples Center; 0	16–38
55	April 14	L. A. Clippers	L 98–100	Jerami Grant (28)	Mason Plumlee (9)	Killian Hayes (6)	Little Caesars Arena; 750	16–39
56	April 16	Oklahoma City	W 110–104	Josh Jackson (29)	Isaiah Stewart (21)	Killian Hayes (7)	Little Caesars Arena; 750	17–39
57	April 17	@ Washington	L 100–121	Stewart & Jackson (19)	Isaiah Stewart (12)	Grant & Lee (4)	Capital One Arena; 0	17–40
58	April 19	Cleveland	W 109–105	Bey & Jackson (20)	Isaiah Stewart (16)	Killian Hayes (9)	Little Caesars Arena; 750	18–40
59	April 21	@ Dallas	L 117–127	Jerami Grant (26)	Mason Plumlee (16)	Mason Plumlee (7)	American Airlines Center; 4,043	18–41
60	April 22	@ San Antonio	L 91–106	Josh Jackson (29)	Isaiah Stewart (13)	Killian Hayes (5)	AT&T Center; 3,334	18–42
61	April 24	@ Indiana	L 109–115	Jerami Grant (25)	Mason Plumlee (21)	Hayes & Plumlee (5)	Bankers Life Fieldhouse; 0	18–43
62	April 26	Atlanta	W 100–86	Grant & Jackson (18)	Isaiah Stewart (11)	Killian Hayes (5)	Little Caesars Arena; 750	19–43
63	April 29	Dallas	L 105–115	Stewart & Jackson (20)	Stewart & Diallo (10)	Killian Hayes (11)	Little Caesars Arena; 750	19–44

May : 1–8 (home: 1–6; road: 0–2)

Game	Date	Team	Score	High points	High rebounds	High assists	Location Attendance	Record
64	May 1	@ Charlotte	L 97–104	Frank Jackson (25)	Bey, Cook & Jackson (7)	Saben Lee (7)	Spectrum Center; 3,766	19–45
65	May 3	Orlando	L 112–119	Saddiq Bey (26)	Saddiq Bey (9)	Hayes & Lee (7)	Little Caesars Arena; 750	19–46
66	May 4	Charlotte	L 99–102	Hamidou Diallo (35)	Saddiq Bey (9)	Killian Hayes (7)	Little Caesars Arena; 750	19–47
67	May 6	Memphis	W 111–97	Joseph & Ellington (18)	Isaiah Stewart (7)	Cory Joseph (11)	Little Caesars Arena; 750	20–47
68	May 8	@ Philadelphia	L 104–118	Bey & Grant (14)	Saddiq Bey (7)	Killian Hayes (6)	Wells Fargo Center; 5,119	20–48
69	May 9	Chicago	L 96–108	Killian Hayes (21)	Bey, Stewart & Hayes (7)	Killian Hayes (8)	Little Caesars Arena; 750	20–49
70	May 11	Minnesota	L 100–119	Saben Lee (22)	Doumbouya & Stewart (8)	Killian Hayes (7)	Little Caesars Arena; 750	20–50
71	May 14	Denver	L 91–104	Hamidou Diallo (18)	Hamidou Diallo (12)	Jackson & Hayes (7)	Little Caesars Arena; 750	20–51
72	May 16	Miami	L 107–120	Saddiq Bey (22)	Tyler Cook (9)	Saben Lee (7)	Little Caesars Arena; 750	20–52

2020–21 season schedule

== Player statistics ==
Legend
GP	Games played	GS	Games started	MPG	Minutes per game
FG%	Field-goal percentage	3P%	3-point field-goal percentage	FT%	Free-throw percentage
RPG	Rebounds per game	APG	Assists per game	SPG	Steals per game
BPG	Blocks per game	PPG	Points per game

=== Regular season ===
Detroit Pistons statistics
Player	GP	GS	MPG	FG%	3P%	FT%	RPG	APG	SPG	BPG	PPG
Saddiq Bey	70	53	27.3	.404	.380	.844	4.5	1.4	.7	.2	12.2
Isaiah Stewart	68	14	21.4	.553	.333	.696	6.7	.9	.6	1.3	7.9
Josh Jackson	62	25	25.2	.419	.300	.729	4.1	2.3	.9	.8	13.4
Mason Plumlee	56	56	26.8	.614	.000	.669	9.3	3.6	.8	.9	10.4
Sekou Doumbouya	56	11	15.5	.379	.226	.703	2.6	.8	.4	.2	5.1
Jerami Grant	54	54	33.9	.429	.350	.845	4.6	2.8	.6	1.1	22.3
Saben Lee	48	7	16.3	.471	.348	.685	2.0	3.6	.7	.3	5.6
Wayne Ellington	46	31	22.0	.441	.422	.800	1.8	1.5	.4	.2	9.6
Frank Jackson	40	6	18.5	.457	.407	.813	2.2	.9	.4	.0	9.8
Delon Wright^{†}	36	31	29.2	.464	.348	.789	4.6	5.0	1.6	.5	10.4
Sviatoslav Mykhailiuk^{†}	36	5	17.6	.377	.333	.800	2.1	1.6	.8	.2	6.9
Tyler Cook^{†}	28	1	15.0	.680	.500	.486	3.3	.5	.3	.1	5.5
Jahlil Okafor	27	2	12.9	.618	.222	.708	2.4	.5	.2	.2	5.4
Killian Hayes	26	18	25.8	.353	.278	.824	2.7	5.3	1.0	.4	6.8
Blake Griffin^{†}	20	20	31.3	.365	.315	.710	5.2	3.9	.7	.1	12.3
Dennis Smith Jr.^{†}	20	9	19.6	.415	.352	.700	2.7	3.7	1.0	.7	7.3
Hamidou Diallo^{†}	20	4	23.3	.468	.390	.662	5.4	1.2	.5	.6	11.2
Deividas Sirvydis	20	0	6.7	.350	.357	.500	1.5	.3	.1	.0	2.1
Cory Joseph^{†}	19	11	26.4	.506	.368	.878	3.2	5.5	1.2	.5	12.0
Rodney McGruder	16	2	12.1	.529	.458	.750	1.4	1.0	.5	.1	5.7
Derrick Rose^{†}	15	0	22.8	.429	.333	.840	1.9	4.2	1.2	.3	14.2

- ^{†} Denotes player spent time with another team in the season. Stats reflect time with the Pistons only.

== Transactions ==
=== Overview ===
Players Added

Via draft

- Killian Hayes

Via trade

- Trevor Ariza
- Saddiq Bey
- Tony Bradley
- Dewayne Dedmon
- Hamidou Diallo
- Jerami Grant
- Jaylen Hands
- Cory Joseph
- Saben Lee
- Rodney McGruder
- Džanan Musa
- Nikola Radičević
- Dennis Smith Jr.
- Zhaire Smith
- Isaiah Stewart
- Delon Wright

Via free agency

- LiAngelo Ball
- Tyler Cook
- Wayne Ellington
- Frank Jackson
- Josh Jackson
- Anthony Lamb
- Jahlil Okafor
- Mason Plumlee
- Deividas Sirvydis
Players Lost

Via trade

- Trevor Ariza
- Tony Bradley
- Bruce Brown
- Luke Kennard
- Sviatoslav Mykhailiuk
- Justin Patton
- Derrick Rose
- Tony Snell
- Khyri Thomas
- Christian Wood
- Delon Wright

Via free agency

- Jordan Bone
- Langston Galloway
- John Henson
- Brandon Knight
- Thon Maker
- Jordan McRae

Waived

- LiAngelo Ball
- Dewayne Dedmon
- Blake Griffin
- Louis King
- Anthony Lamb
- Džanan Musa
- Zhaire Smith

=== Trades ===
November 19, 2020	Three-team trade
November 19, 2020	To Brooklyn Nets Bruce Brown (from Detroit) Landry Shamet (from Los Angeles) Draft rights to Reggie Perry (from Los Angeles)	To Los Angeles Clippers Luke Kennard (from Detroit) Justin Patton (from Detroit) Draft rights to Jay Scrubb (from Brooklyn) 2023 second round draft pick (from Portland via Detroit) 2024 second round draft pick (from Detroit) 2025 second round draft pick (from Detroit) 2026 second round draft pick (from Detroit)
November 19, 2020	To Detroit Pistons Rodney McGruder (from Los Angeles) Džanan Musa (from Brooklyn) Draft rights to Saddiq Bey (from Brooklyn) Draft rights to Jaylen Hands (from Brooklyn) 2021 second round draft pick (from Toronto via Brooklyn) Cash considerations
November 20, 2020	To Detroit Pistons Dewayne Dedmon	To Atlanta Hawks Tony Snell; Khyri Thomas
November 22, 2020	To Detroit Pistons Tony Bradley; Draft rights to Saben Lee	To Utah Jazz Cash considerations
November 22, 2020	To Detroit Pistons Jerami Grant; Draft rights to Nikola Radičević	To Denver Nuggets Cash considerations
November 23, 2020	To Detroit Pistons Zhaire Smith	To Philadelphia 76ers Tony Bradley
November 24, 2020	To Detroit Pistons Trevor Ariza; Draft rights to Isaiah Stewart; Future second-round draft pick Cash considerations	To Houston Rockets Christian Wood; 2021 second-round pick Protected future first-round pick
November 27, 2020	Three-team trade
November 27, 2020	To Dallas Mavericks James Johnson (from Oklahoma City)	To Oklahoma City Thunder Trevor Ariza (from Detroit) Justin Jackson (from Dallas) 2023 second round draft pick (from Dallas or Miami) 2026 second round draft pick (from Dallas)
November 27, 2020	To Detroit Pistons Delon Wright (from Dallas)
February 8, 2021	To Detroit Pistons Dennis Smith Jr. 2021 second-round draft pick (from Charlotte via New York)	To New York Knicks Derrick Rose
March 13, 2021	To Detroit Pistons Hamidou Diallo	To Oklahoma City Thunder Sviatoslav Mykhailiuk; Future second-round pick
March 26, 2021	To Detroit Pistons Cory Joseph; 2021 second-round draft pick (from Los Angeles via Sacramento); 2024 second-round draft pick (from Sacramento)	To Sacramento Kings Delon Wright

=== Free agency ===
==== Re-signed ====
Date	Player	Contract terms	Ref.
December 2	Louis King	Two-way contract	

==== Additions ====
Date	Player	Contract terms	Former team	Ref.
December 1	Josh Jackson	2-year contract worth $9.77 million	Memphis Grizzlies	
December 1	Jahlil Okafor	2-year contract worth $4.01 million	New Orleans Pelicans	
December 1	Mason Plumlee	3-year contract worth $24.66 million	Denver Nuggets	
December 1	Deividas Sirvydis	3-year contract worth $4.2 million	(Israel) Hapoel Jerusalem	
December 2	Wayne Ellington	1-year contract worth $2.56 million	New York Knicks	
December 3	LiAngelo Ball	Exhibit 10 contract	Oklahoma City Blue	
December 3	Anthony Lamb	Exhibit 10 contract	Vermont Catamounts	
December 27	Frank Jackson	Two-way contract	New Orleans Pelicans	
March 19	Tyler Cook	10-day contract	Brooklyn Nets	

==== Subtractions ====
Date	Player	Reason	New team	Ref.
November 20	Brandon Knight	Unrestricted free agent		
November 24	Dewayne Dedmon	Waived	Miami Heat	
November 27	Jordan Bone	Unrestricted free agent	Orlando Magic	
November 30	Langston Galloway	Unrestricted free agent	Phoenix Suns	
November 30	Thon Maker	Unrestricted free agent	Cleveland Cavaliers	
November 30	Zhaire Smith	Waived	Memphis Hustle	
December 14	LiAngelo Ball	Waived		
December 14	Louis King	Waived	New York Knicks	
December 14	Anthony Lamb	Waived	Canton Charge	
December 20	Džanan Musa	Waived	(Turkey) Anadolu Efes	
December 27	Jordan McRae	Unrestricted free agent	(China) Beijing Ducks	
March 5	Blake Griffin	Waived	Brooklyn Nets	
April 5	John Henson	Unrestricted free agent	New York Knicks	
