= Sviatoslav Mykhailiuk =

Ukrainian basketball player (born 1997)

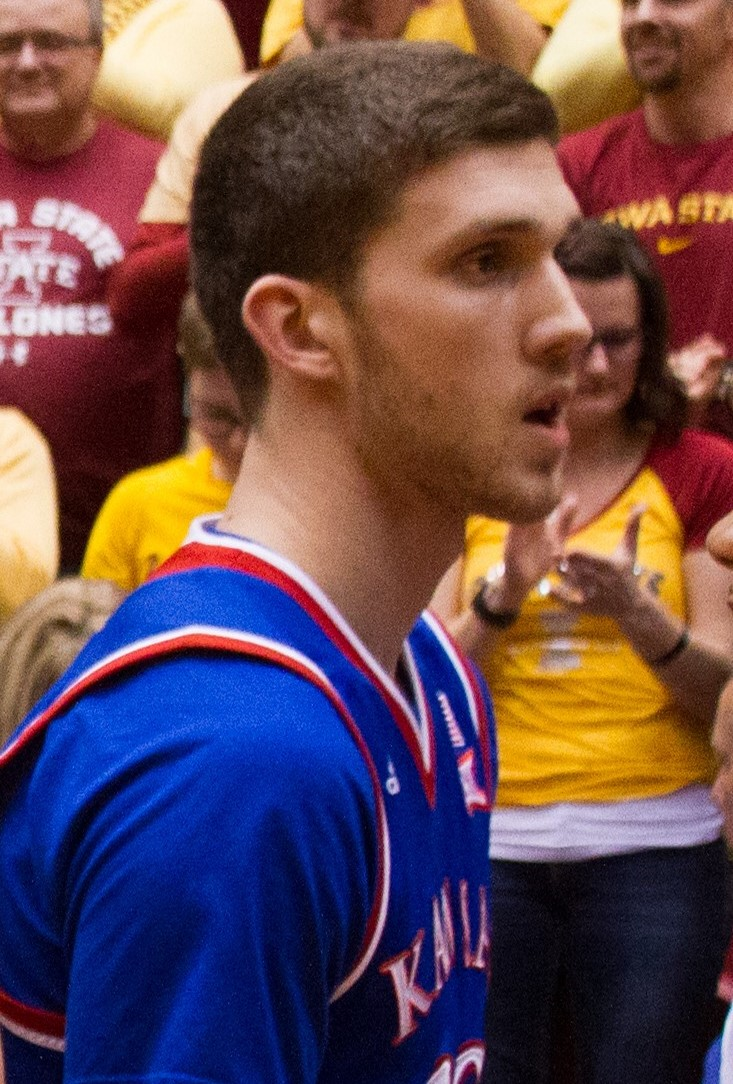
- Mykhailiuk with Kansas in 2016

No. 10 – Utah Jazz
- Position: Small forward / shooting guard
- League: NBA

Personal information
- Born: June 10, 1997 (age 29) Cherkasy, Ukraine
- Listed height: 6 ft 6 in (1.98 m)
- Listed weight: 205 lb (93 kg)

Career information
- High school: Cherkasy First City Gymnasia (Cherkasy, Ukraine)
- College: Kansas (2014–2018)
- NBA draft: 2018: 2nd round, 47th overall pick
- Drafted by: Los Angeles Lakers
- Playing career: 2012–2014; 2018–present

Career history
- 2012–2014: Cherkaski Mavpy
- 2018–2019: Los Angeles Lakers
- 2018–2019: →South Bay Lakers
- 2019–2021: Detroit Pistons
- 2019: →Grand Rapids Drive
- 2021: Oklahoma City Thunder
- 2021–2022: Toronto Raptors
- 2022: →Raptors 905
- 2022–2023: New York Knicks
- 2022: →Westchester Knicks
- 2023: Charlotte Hornets
- 2023–2024: Boston Celtics
- 2024–present: Utah Jazz

Career highlights
- NBA champion (2024); Second-team All-Big 12 (2018)
- Stats at NBA.com
- Stats at Basketball Reference

Sviatoslav Yuriyovych "Svi" Mykhailiuk (Ukrainian: Святосла́в Ю́рійович Михайлю́к, pronounced [sʲwʲɐtoˈslɑu̯ mɪxɐjˈlʲuk]; born June 10, 1997) is a Ukrainian professional basketball player for the Utah Jazz of the National Basketball Association (NBA). He played college basketball for the Kansas Jayhawks and prior to that, he played for Cherkaski Mavpy in the Ukrainian Basketball SuperLeague from 2012 to 2014 and for the Ukraine national team at the 2014 FIBA World Cup. As a reserve with the 2023-24 Boston Celtics, Mykhailiuk won an NBA championship.

== Early life ==
Born in Cherkasy, Ukraine, Mykhailiuk's mother, Inna, is a high school biology teacher, and his father, Iurri, is a college history professor. He attended high school at Cherkasy First City Gymnasia.

== College career ==
Mykhailiuk received offers from Virginia, Iowa State, Oregon, and Kansas. On May 21, 2014, Mykhailiuk committed to play basketball at the University of Kansas and played for the team during their 2014–15 season. During his freshman season, he started five of the first seven games of the season, averaging 21.3 minutes a game, but his playing time since then was significantly curtailed. He scored 11 points while playing 32 minutes in the Orlando Classic Championship game against Michigan State on November 30, 2014. He was the youngest player in Big 12 Conference history at 17 years old.

Returning to Kansas in his sophomore year, Mykhailiuk averaged 5.4 points, 1.3 rebounds, and 0.9 assists per game in 35 games of the 2015–16 season while hitting 40.2 percent of his three-point shots. On November 23, 2015, Mykhailiuk scored 18 points against Chaminade. In the first round of the 2016 NCAA basketball tourney, on March 17, 2016, Mykhailiuk scored 23 points, setting his personal college career scoring record, with 9 of 11 field goals and 4 of 5 threes against the Austin Peay.

Mykhailiuk returned to Kansas for his junior year of college. On December 22, 2016, in a game against UNLV, Mykhailiuk scored 20 points with 6 rebounds, 2 assists, and 2 steals, helping KU to a 71–53 win. In the UNLV game, Mykhailiuk made 4 of 6 three-point attempts. In the 2016–17 season, Mykhailiuk averaged 10.6 points per game, 3.5 rebounds per game, and 1.6 assists per game, while shooting 41.5 percent from three-point territory. On April 12, 2017, Mykhailiuk decided to enter the 2017 NBA draft, but did not hire an agent, allowing him to return for his senior year. Mykhailiuk opted to return to Kansas for the 2017–18 season.

On November 17, 2017, Mykhailiuk scored a career high 27 points in a game against San Diego State. He set a school record for 3–pointers made in a season during the Jayhawks 2017–18 season with 115.

== Professional career ==
=== Cherkaski Mavpy (2012–2014) ===
Prior to playing at Kansas, Mykhailiuk played professionally for Cherkaski Mavpy, his hometown club team, in the Ukrainian Basketball SuperLeague from 2012 to 2014.

=== Los Angeles Lakers (2018–2019) ===
On June 21, 2018, Mykhailiuk was selected with the 47th overall pick in the 2018 NBA draft by the Los Angeles Lakers. On July 10, he signed a three-year, $4.6 million rookie scale contract with the Lakers.

=== Detroit Pistons (2019–2021) ===
On February 6, 2019, Mykhailiuk was traded to the Detroit Pistons, along with a future second-round draft pick, in exchange for Reggie Bullock.

=== Oklahoma City Thunder (2021) ===
On March 13, 2021, Mykhailiuk was traded to the Oklahoma City Thunder, along with a 2027 second-round draft pick, in exchange for Hamidou Diallo.

=== Toronto Raptors (2021–2022) ===
On August 31, 2021, Mykhailiuk signed a 2-year deal with the Toronto Raptors for just over $3.6 million. On August 29, 2022, Mykhailiuk was waived by the Raptors.

=== New York Knicks (2022–2023) ===
On September 18, 2022, Mykhailiuk signed a 1-year deal with the New York Knicks.

=== Charlotte Hornets (2023) ===
On February 8, 2023, the Knicks reached an agreement to trade Mykhailiuk, Ryan Arcidiacono, Cam Reddish, and draft considerations to the Portland Trail Blazers for Josh Hart. The following day, the deal was reworked into a four-team trade involving the Charlotte Hornets and Philadelphia 76ers, with the Hornets receiving Mykhailiuk, the 76ers receiving Jalen McDaniels, the Knicks receiving Hart and the Trail Blazers receiving Arcidiacono, Reddish and Matisse Thybulle. He made his Hornets debut on February 15, recording 12 points and two rebounds in a 120–110 win over the San Antonio Spurs.

=== Boston Celtics (2023–2024) ===
On August 31, 2023, Mykhailiuk signed a 1-year deal with the Boston Celtics. On June 6, 2024, he made his debut in the NBA Finals against Dallas Mavericks, becoming the second Ukrainian to achieve this feat following Slava Medvedenko. He eventually achieved the NBA title with his club, which won their 18th championship overall.

=== Utah Jazz (2024–present) ===
On 13 August 2024, Mykhailiuk signed a 4-year deal with the Utah Jazz. On November 6, 2025, Mykhailiuk scored an NBA career high 28 points in a game against Detroit Pistons.

== National team career ==
=== Ukrainian junior national team ===
In the summer of 2013, Mykhailiuk played with the Ukrainian Under-16 junior national team in the 2013 FIBA Europe Under-16 Championship. He was selected to the All-Tournament Team, after completing an outstanding championship, averaging 25.2 points, 8.0 rebounds and 3.4 assists per game.

Mykhailiuk played for the Ukrainian under-20 junior national team in the 2016 FIBA Europe Under-20 Championship in Helsinki. During the tournament, Mykhailiuk led his team in scoring, at 14.9 points per game, in seven tourney games. He hit 36.8 percent of his floor shots. Mykhailiuk shot 47.2 percent from two-point and 19 percent from three-point territory. He made 85.7 percent of his free throws and also grabbed 5.6 rebounds a game, with 2.7 assists, 4.7 turnovers, and 2.1 steals per game.

He played for the Ukrainian under-20 team again in the 2017 FIBA Europe Under-20 Championship, where he was the leading scorer of the tournament, averaging 20.4 points per game.

=== Ukrainian senior national team ===
Mykhailiuk played with the senior men's Ukraine national basketball team, which competed at the 2014 FIBA Basketball World Cup, in Spain, from August 30 to September 14.

== Career statistics ==
Legend
GP	Games played	GS	Games started	MPG	Minutes per game
FG%	Field goal percentage	3P%	3-point field goal percentage	FT%	Free throw percentage
RPG	Rebounds per game	APG	Assists per game	SPG	Steals per game
BPG	Blocks per game	PPG	Points per game	**Bold**	Career high
†	Won an NBA championship

=== NBA ===
==== Regular season ====
Year	Team	GP	GS	MPG	FG%	3P%	FT%	RPG	APG	SPG	BPG	PPG
2018–19	L.A. Lakers	39	0	10.8	.333	.318	.600	.9	.8	.3	.0	3.3
2018–19	Detroit	3	0	6.6	.250	.500	—	.7	1.3	.3	.0	2.0
2019–20	Detroit	**56**	27	22.6	.410	.404	.814	1.9	1.9	.7	.1	9.0
2020–21	Detroit	36	5	17.6	.377	.333	.800	2.1	1.6	**.8**	**.2**	6.9
2020–21	Oklahoma City	30	9	23.0	.438	.336	.700	**3.0**	1.8	**.8**	**.2**	10.3
2021–22	Toronto	**56**	5	12.8	.389	.306	.865	1.6	.8	.5	.1	4.6
2022–23	New York	13	0	3.1	**.500**	**.600**	.600	.5	.1	.1	.0	1.6
2022–23	Charlotte	19	8	22.5	.441	.404	.676	2.4	**2.7**	.7	**.2**	**10.6**
2023–24†	Boston	41	2	10.1	.416	.389	.667	1.2	.9	.3	.0	4.0
2024–25	Utah	38	13	20.0	.391	.345	.800	2.4	2.0	.5	.2	8.8
2025–26	Utah	50	**41**	**23.1**	.478	.408	**.893**	2.5	1.9	.5	.1	9.4
Career		381	110	17.2	.414	.368	.778	1.9	1.5	.5	.1	6.9

==== Playoffs ====
Year	Team	GP	GS	MPG	FG%	3P%	FT%	RPG	APG	SPG	BPG	PPG
2022	Toronto	3	0	1.6	.000	.000	1.000	.3	.0	.0	.0	.3
2024†	Boston	**8**	0	**4.0**	**.250**	**.222**	—	**.6**	**.1**	**.1**	.0	**1.0**
Career		11	0	3.3	.214	.182	1.000	.5	.1	.1	.0	.8

=== College ===
Year	Team	GP	GS	MPG	FG%	3P%	FT%	RPG	APG	SPG	BPG	PPG
2014–15	Kansas	26	6	11.2	.306	.288	**.833**	1.2	.7	.3	.0	2.8
2015–16	Kansas	35	0	12.8	**.450**	.402	.680	1.3	.9	.3	.1	5.4
2016–17	Kansas	36	25	27.3	.443	.398	.702	3.0	1.3	.9	**.3**	9.8
2017–18	Kansas	**39**	**39**	**34.5**	.434	**.444**	.804	**3.9**	**2.7**	**1.2**	**.3**	**14.6**
Career		136	70	22.6	.428	.409	.746	2.5	1.5	.7	.2	8.7

== Personal life ==
Following Russia's invasion of Ukraine on February 23, 2022, Mykhailiuk along with the only other Ukrainian NBA player, Alex Len, released a statement condemning the invasion. The statement read "A great tragedy befell our dear homeland of Ukraine. We categorically condemn the war. Ukraine is a peaceful, sovereign state inhabited by people who want to control their own destiny. We pray for their families, friends, and relatives and all the people who are in the territory of Ukraine. We hope for an end to this terrible war as soon as possible. Dear fellow Ukrainians, hold on! Our strength is in unity! We are with you!"
