= Trayvon Palmer =

American basketball player (born 1994)

Personal information
- Born: November 13, 1994 (age 32) Milwaukee, Wisconsin, U.S.
- Listed height: 6 ft 6 in (1.98 m)
- Listed weight: 200 lb (91 kg)

Career information
- High school: Brown Deer (Brown Deer, Wisconsin)
- College: NDSCS (2013–2014); Chicago State (2014–2017)
- NBA draft: 2017: undrafted
- Playing career: 2017–2024
- Position: Shooting guard

Career history
- 2017–2018: Worcester Wolves
- 2018: Santa Cruz Warriors
- 2018–2023: Northern Arizona Suns / Motor City Cruise
- 2021–2022: Detroit Pistons
- 2024: Marinos B.B.C.
- Stats at NBA.com
- Stats at Basketball Reference

Trayvon Palmer (born November 13, 1994) is an American former professional basketball player. He played college basketball for the North Dakota State College of Science (NDSCS) and Chicago State University.

== College career ==
Palmer played one season of junior college basketball for NDSCS, averaging 13.3 points and 10.1 rebounds per game in the 2013–14 season. He then transferred to NCAA Division I Chicago State. He averaged 9.5 points and 7.8 rebounds per game as a junior. As a senior, Palmer averaged 15.1 points and 9.4 rebounds per game and earned Chicago State's Student-Athlete of the Year honors.

== Professional career ==
=== Worcester Wolves (2017–2018) ===
Palmer began his professional career in 2017 with the Worcester Wolves of the British Basketball League. After a year in England, in which he averaged 14.6 points, 6.0 rebounds and 2.8 assists per game, he returned to the United States.

=== Santa Cruz Warriors (2018) ===
Palmer joined the NBA G League, signing with the Santa Cruz Warriors on November 28, 2018.

=== Northern Arizona Suns / Motor City Cruise (2018–2021) ===
After averaging 8.5 points and 5.5 rebounds per game in two games, he was acquired by the Northern Arizona Suns in December 2018. Palmer moved with the team to Detroit as the team became the Motor City Cruise in 2021. He averaged 11.1 points and six rebounds per game for the Cruise.

=== Detroit Pistons (2021–2022) ===
On December 28, 2021, Palmer was signed to a 10-day contract by the Detroit Pistons of the NBA under league hardship exceptions concerning COVID-19. He made his NBA debut the following day in a 94–85 loss to the New York Knicks, grabbing two rebounds.

=== Return to the Cruise (2022–2023) ===
On January 3, 2022, Palmer was reassigned to the Motor City Cruise. He then was placed there at the expiration of his 10-day contract.

=== Marinos de Oriente (2024) ===
On February 20, 2024, Palmer signed with the Marinos de Oriente of the Superliga Profesional de Baloncesto.

== Career statistics ==
Legend
GP	Games played	GS	Games started	MPG	Minutes per game
FG%	Field goal percentage	3P%	3-point field goal percentage	FT%	Free throw percentage
RPG	Rebounds per game	APG	Assists per game	SPG	Steals per game
BPG	Blocks per game	PPG	Points per game	**Bold**	Career high

=== NBA ===
Year	Team	GP	GS	MPG	FG%	3P%	FT%	RPG	APG	SPG	BPG	PPG
2021–22	Detroit	1	0	17.0	.000	—	—	2.0	.0	.0	.0	.0
Career		1	0	17.0	.000	—	—	2.0	.0	.0	.0	.0
