= Hamidou Diallo =

American basketball player (born 1998)

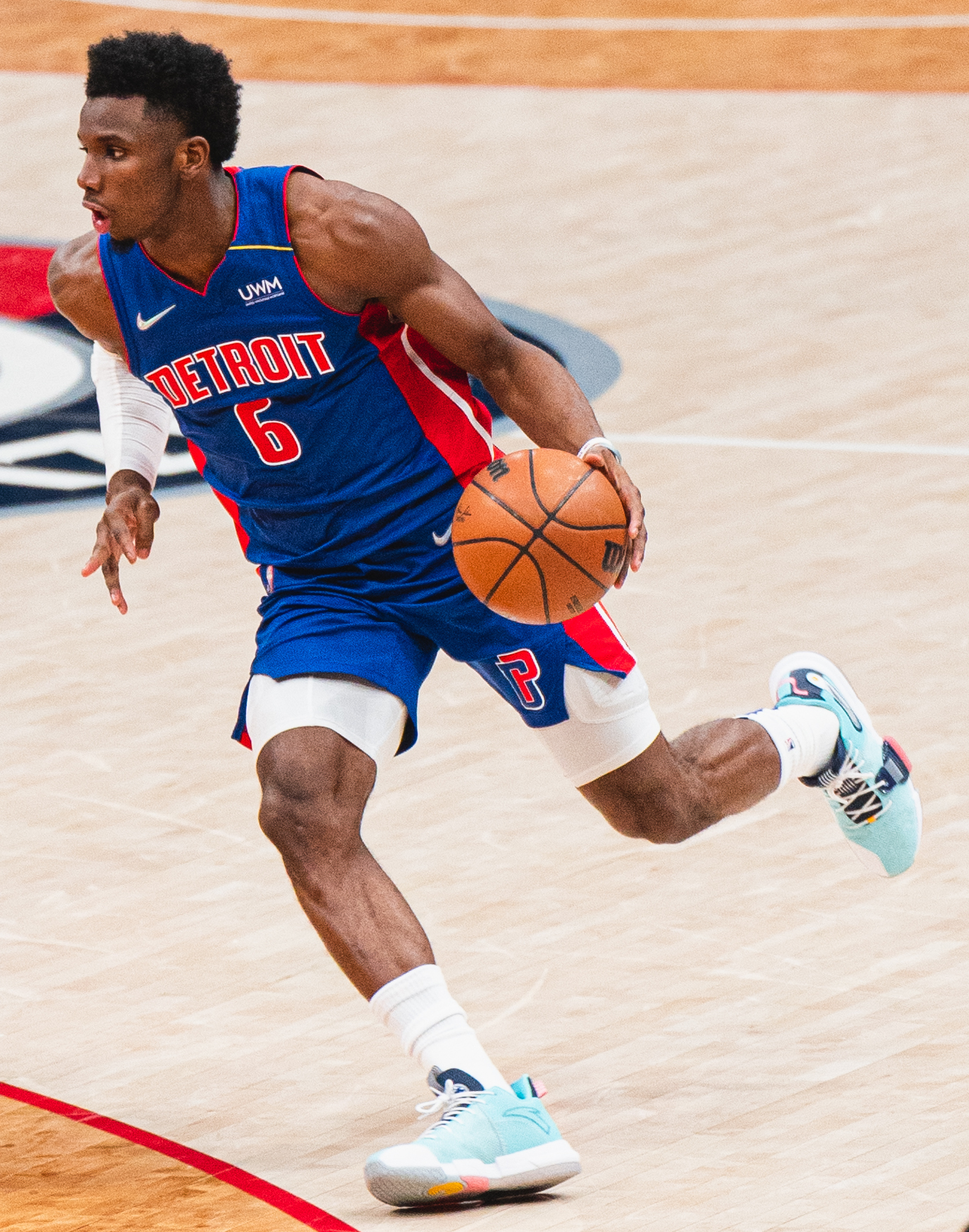
- Diallo with the Detroit Pistons in 2022

No. 11 – Shanxi Loongs
- Position: Shooting guard / Small forward
- League: CBA

Personal information
- Born: July 31, 1998 (age 28) Queens, New York, U.S.
- Listed height: 6 ft 6 in (1.98 m)
- Listed weight: 202 lb (92 kg)

Career information
- High school: John Bowne (Flushing, New York); Putnam Science Academy (Putnam, Connecticut)
- College: Kentucky (2017–2018)
- NBA draft: 2018: 2nd round, 45th overall pick
- Drafted by: Brooklyn Nets
- Playing career: 2018–present

Career history
- 2018–2021: Oklahoma City Thunder
- 2019: →Oklahoma City Blue
- 2021–2023: Detroit Pistons
- 2023–2024: Capital City Go-Go
- 2024: Washington Wizards
- 2024: →Capital City Go-Go
- 2024–present: Shanxi Loongs
- 2025: Saski Baskonia

Career highlights
- NBA Slam Dunk Contest champion (2019); 2× CBA All-Star (2025, 2026)
- Stats at NBA.com
- Stats at Basketball Reference
Medals
Men's basketball
Representing the United States
FIBA Americas U18 Championship
Gold medal – first place	2016 Chile	National team
Bronze medal – third place	2017 Egypt

Hamidou Diallo (born July 31, 1998) is an American professional basketball player for Shanxi Loongs of the Chinese Basketball Association (CBA). He played college basketball for the Kentucky Wildcats. He was a consensus five-star prospect, and one of the top-rated basketball players in the class of 2017. He won the 2019 Slam Dunk Contest.

== High school career ==
Diallo attended John Bowne High School in Flushing, New York during his freshman and sophomore year. He also attended Putnam Science Academy. As a sophomore, he averaged 17.1 points, 6.6 rebounds per game, and 2.7 assists. During the 2015 summer, Diallo competed on the Under Armour Association Circuit (UAA) for the AAU team, New York Jayhawks, where he averaged 22.5 points and 5.0 rebounds per game. Later that summer Diallo was invited to both NBPA Top 100 and Adidas Nations camps.

Diallo transferred to Putnam Science Academy in Putnam, Connecticut prior to his junior year. As a junior, he averaged 17.0 points per game, and 4.0 rebounds while leading Putnam to a (35–7) overall record. In the 2016 summer, Diallo then joined the AAU team, New York Rens on the Nike Elite Youth Basketball League (EYBL) Circuit. He averaged 18.6 points, and 2.1 assists while leading the Rens to the season-ending Peach Jam. As a senior in 2016–17, he averaged 19.0 points, 6.0 rebounds, and 3.0 assists where he led the Mustangs to a (38–3) record. Diallo was considered one of the top players in the 2017 recruiting class by Scout.com, Rivals.com and ESPN. Diallo was heavily recruited by six schools: University of Kentucky, University of Arizona, Indiana University, University of Kansas, Syracuse University, and the University of Connecticut.

== College career ==
On January 7, 2017, Diallo committed to the University of Kentucky. He reclassified, graduating a semester early and joining the Wildcats midseason that month. He would start participating with the team in practices, but would not play a single game that year due to his late entry into the program. Diallo was one of a record-high 182 players to declare for the 2017 NBA draft, despite not having played a single college game in the process.

On May 24, 2017, Diallo announced that he would return to Kentucky to play in their 2017–18 season, despite draft scouts saying he could have been taken in the first round of the draft that year.

Diallo had season averages of 10.0 points and 3.6 rebounds per game.

== Professional career ==
=== Oklahoma City Thunder (2018–2021) ===
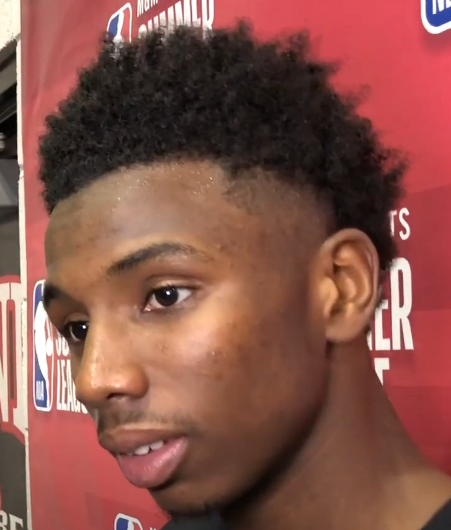
Diallo at the 2018 NBA Summer League

On June 21, 2018, Diallo was selected with the 45th pick in the 2018 NBA draft by the Brooklyn Nets. His draft rights were subsequently traded to the Charlotte Hornets, and then to the Oklahoma City Thunder. On July 28, 2018, the Thunder announced that they had signed Diallo to his rookie-scale contract. On October 16, 2018, Diallo made his debut in NBA, coming off the bench in a 100–108 loss to the Golden State Warriors with four points, a rebound, an assist and a steal. On November 19, 2018, Diallo scored a career-high 18 points with two steals, a rebound, and an assist in a 113–117 loss to the Sacramento Kings.

On February 16, 2019, Diallo won the NBA Slam Dunk Contest, becoming the first Oklahoma City Thunder player ever to win it. For one dunk he jumped over Shaquille O'Neal, and did the "honey dip" dunk popularized by Vince Carter, and displayed a Superman undershirt while hanging from the rim. In another dunk, he jumped over rapper Quavo who held the ball above his head and finished it with two hands.

=== Detroit Pistons (2021–2023) ===
On March 13, 2021, Diallo was traded to the Detroit Pistons in exchange for Sviatoslav Mykhailiuk and a future second-round draft pick.

On August 19, 2021, Diallo signed a two-year, $10.4 million rookie-scale extension with the Pistons. On March 25, 2022, he was ruled out for the remainder of the 2021–22 season with an avulsion fracture in his left index finger.

On December 29, 2022, Diallo was suspended by the NBA for one game without pay due to an altercation during a game against the Orlando Magic the day before. On March 6, 2023, during a 110–104 loss to the Portland Trail Blazers, he suffered a right ankle injury. The next day, the Pistons announced that Diallo had suffered a grade 2 sprain in his right ankle and would be re-evaluated in three to four weeks. In a press conference the same day, however, Pistons head coach Dwane Casey stated that Diallo would miss the rest of the 2022–23 season.

=== Washington Wizards / Capital City Go-Go (2023–2024) ===
On October 21, 2023, Diallo signed with the Washington Wizards, but was waived the same day. On October 30, he joined the Capital City Go-Go.

On January 9, 2024, Diallo signed a 10-day contract with the Wizards. On January 19, he returned to Capital City.

=== Shanxi Loongs (2024–2025) ===
On September 11, 2024, Diallo signed with the Shanxi Loongs of the Chinese Basketball Association.

=== Saski Baskonia (2025) ===
On August 7, 2025, Diallo signed a two-year contract with Saski Baskonia of the Liga ACB and the EuroLeague. On December 3, 2025, Diallo left the club.

== National team career ==
Diallo competed for the under-18 United States national basketball team that captured gold in the FIBA Americas Under-18 Championship game in 2016. He won bronze at the 2017 FIBA Under-19 Basketball World Cup in Egypt.

== Career statistics ==
Legend
GP	Games played	GS	Games started	MPG	Minutes per game
FG%	Field goal percentage	3P%	3-point field goal percentage	FT%	Free throw percentage
RPG	Rebounds per game	APG	Assists per game	SPG	Steals per game
BPG	Blocks per game	PPG	Points per game	**Bold**	Career high

=== NBA ===
==== Regular season ====
Year	Team	GP	GS	MPG	FG%	3P%	FT%	RPG	APG	SPG	BPG	PPG
2018–19	Oklahoma City	51	3	10.3	.455	.167	.610	1.9	.3	.4	.2	3.7
2019–20	Oklahoma City	46	3	19.5	.446	.281	.603	3.6	.8	.8	.2	6.9
2020–21	Oklahoma City	32	5	**23.8**	.481	.293	.629	5.2	**2.4**	1.0	.4	**11.9**
2020–21	Detroit	20	4	23.3	.468	**.390**	**.662**	**5.4**	1.2	.5	**.6**	11.2
2021–22	Detroit	**58**	**29**	21.9	.496	.247	.650	4.8	1.3	**1.2**	.3	11.0
2022–23	Detroit	56	0	17.8	**.573**	.238	.588	3.5	1.0	.9	.3	9.3
2023–24	Washington	2	0	2.4	.500	—	—	1.0	.5	1.0	.0	1.0
Career		265	44	18.6	.495	.274	.623	3.8	1.1	.8	.3	8.6

==== Playoffs ====
Year	Team	GP	GS	MPG	FG%	3P%	FT%	RPG	APG	SPG	BPG	PPG
2020	Oklahoma City	3	0	8.3	.364	.200	.571	2.0	.3	.0	.7	4.3
Career		3	0	8.3	.364	.200	.571	2.0	.3	.0	.7	4.3

=== College ===
Year	Team	GP	GS	MPG	FG%	3P%	FT%	RPG	APG	SPG	BPG	PPG
2017–18	Kentucky	37	37	24.8	.428	.338	.616	3.6	1.2	.8	.4	10.0

== Personal life ==
Diallo grew up in LeFrak City, Queens, New York. He attended JHS 157 Stephen A. Halsey. He is of Guinean descent; his parents, Abdoulaye and Mariama, emigrated to the U.S. from Guinea.
