= Josh Jackson (basketball) =

American basketball player (born 1997)

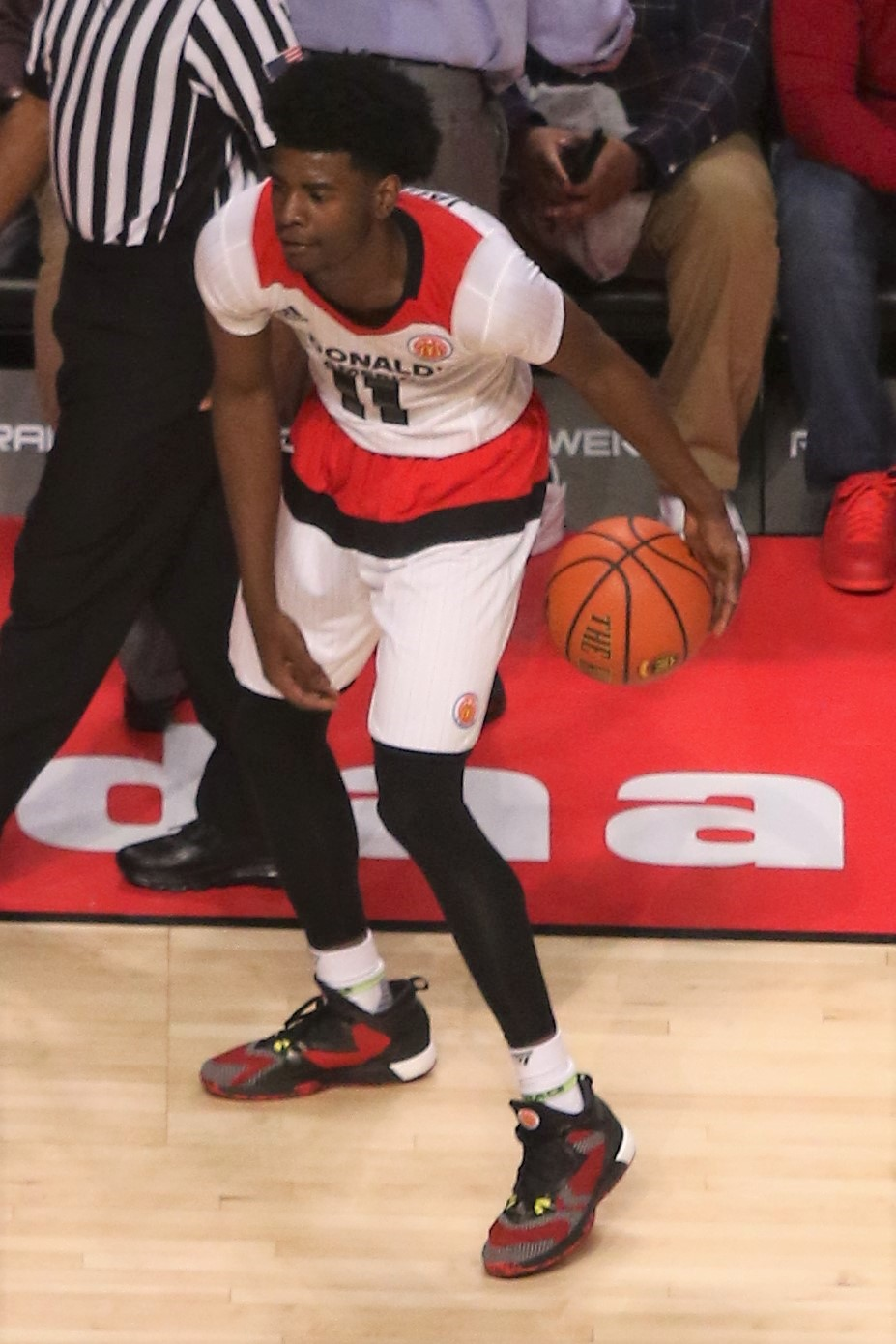
- Jackson in the 2016 McDonald's All-American Boys Game

Personal information
- Born: February 10, 1997 (age 29) San Diego, California, U.S.
- Listed height: 6 ft 8 in (2.03 m)
- Listed weight: 207 lb (94 kg)

Career information
- High school: Consortium College Prep School (Detroit, Michigan); Justin-Siena (Napa, California)
- College: Kansas (2016–2017)
- NBA draft: 2017: 1st round, 4th overall pick
- Drafted by: Phoenix Suns
- Playing career: 2017–2023
- Position: Shooting guard / small forward
- Number: 20, 55

Career history
- 2017–2019: Phoenix Suns
- 2019–2020: Memphis Grizzlies
- 2019–2020: →Memphis Hustle
- 2020–2022: Detroit Pistons
- 2022: Sacramento Kings
- 2023: Stockton Kings

Career highlights
- NBA All-Rookie Second Team (2018); Second-team All-American – SN (2017); Third-team All-American – AP, NABC (2017); First-team All-Big 12 (2017); Big 12 Freshman of the Year (2017); McDonald's All-American Co-MVP (2016)
- Stats at NBA.com
- Stats at Basketball Reference
Medals
Men's basketball
Representing the United States
FIBA U19 World Championship
Gold medal – first place	2015 Greece	National team
FIBA U17 World Championship
Gold medal – first place	2014 Dubai	National team

Joshua O'Neal Jackson (born February 10, 1997) is an American former professional basketball player, who played five seasons in the National Basketball Association (NBA). He played one season of college basketball for the Kansas Jayhawks before declaring for the 2017 NBA draft, where he was selected fourth overall by the Phoenix Suns. Due to not meeting the expectations of being the fourth overall pick and the short length of his career, Jackson is considered by many to be a draft bust.

== Early life ==
Jackson was born in San Diego County, California while his mother, Apples Jones, was serving in the U.S. Navy and lived there until he was eight months old when she moved them to Detroit to be closer to her family. In the eighth grade, he was held back a grade due to his passion for basketball overtaking his grades, with Jackson going to Voyager Middle School for his repeated year before entering high school. He attended Consortium College Prep School in Detroit his freshman and sophomore years, before moving to Napa, California to attend Justin-Siena High School for his junior and senior year.

== High school career ==
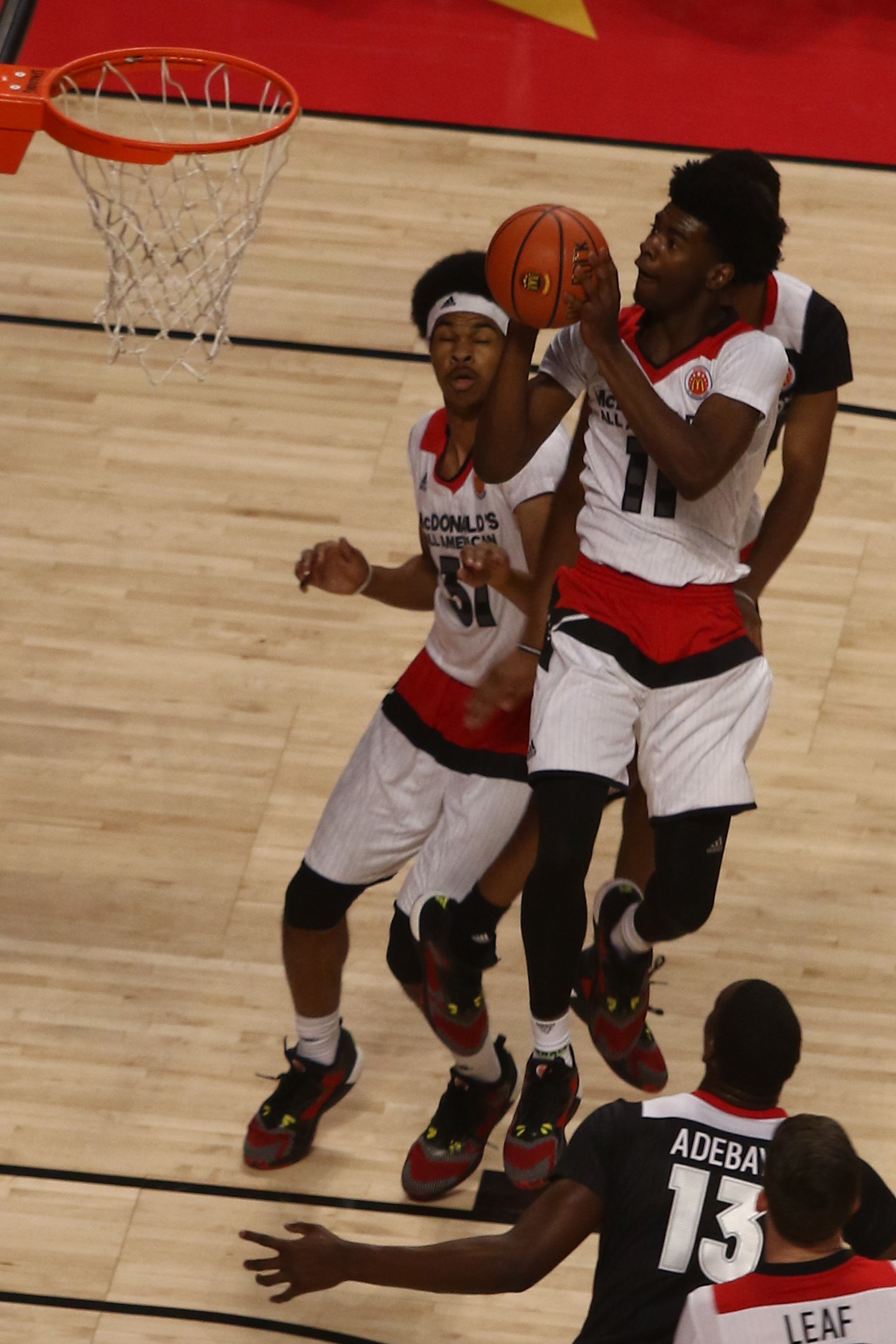
Jackson drives to the basket in the 2016 McDonald's All-American Game.

As a freshman for the Consortium College Prep School, Jackson averaged 17 points, six rebounds, four assists and four blocks per game. As a sophomore, he led the school to their first state title. He averaged 28 points, 15 rebounds and six assists per game.

Prior to his junior year, Jackson and his family moved to California to attend Justin-Siena High School in Napa, California and play for Prolific Prep. As a Junior, he averaged 31.2 points per game and 5.4 assists. As a Senior, Jackson averaged 26.9 points and 13.1 rebounds per game. Jackson played AAU basketball for 1Nation Elite, a program founded by his mother. In March 2016, Jackson, played in the 2016 McDonald's All-American Game and led in scoring with 19 points, whilst also recording four rebounds and three assists. He was named co-MVP alongside Frank Jackson.

Jackson was a five-star recruit and was regarded as one of the top players in the 2016 high school class. He was ranked number one in the 2016 class by both Rivals.com and Scout.com, while ESPN ranked him at number two behind only Harry Giles. 247Sports.com ranked him both as the top-rated player in the 2016 class along with giving him a 102 rating, the highest rating ever given to a recruit by the website.

College recruiting
Name	Hometown	School	Height	Weight	Commit date
Josh Jackson; G/F	Southfield, MI	Prolific Prep	6 ft 7 in (2.01 m)	195 lb (88 kg)	Apr 11, 2016
Josh Jackson; G/F	Recruit ratings: Scout: Rivals: 247Sports: (97)				
Overall recruit ranking: Scout: 1 Rivals: 1 ESPN: 2
Note: In many cases, Scout, Rivals, 247Sports, On3, and ESPN may conflict in their listings of height and weight.; In these cases, the average was taken. ESPN grades are on a 100-point scale.; Sources:

== College career ==
On April 11, 2016, Jackson tweeted that he would be attending the University of Kansas in Lawrence, Kansas to play basketball, picking KU over Michigan State and Arizona. During his only season at Kansas, Jackson showcased his all-around play between scoring, rebounding, play-making and defending. Although he started as a power forward for the Jayhawks, not Jackson's normal positions of both small forward or shooting guard, he still recorded 16.3 points, 7.4 rebounds, 3.0 assists, 1.7 steals and 1.1 blocks per game with the team in his freshman season. As a result of his efforts, he was named as an All-Big 12 First Team member, the Big 12 Freshman of the Year, was named as a second-team All-American according to Sporting News, and was also considered a third-team All-American according to the Associated Press and National Association of Basketball Coaches. On April 17, 2017, Jackson officially declared for the 2017 NBA draft and hired former Chicago Bulls point guard B. J. Armstrong as his agent, officially forgoing his remaining college eligibility.

== Professional career ==
=== Phoenix Suns (2017–2019) ===
==== 2017–18 season ====
On June 22, 2017, Jackson was selected by the Phoenix Suns with the fourth pick in the 2017 NBA draft, being their second straight selection at pick #4 after Dragan Bender. After he was drafted 4th by Phoenix, it was reported that Jackson had cancelled his workout with the Boston Celtics, who held the 3rd pick after trading the #1 pick to the Philadelphia 76ers, just as the Celtics management and staff were midway to Sacramento to meet him, something that reportedly angered Celtics general manager Danny Ainge, although Ainge denied that it factored into his decision to not draft Jackson. When questioned on it, Ryan McDonough, the general manager of the Suns, did not deny any collusion between the Suns and Jackson's representatives to dissuade the Celtics from drafting Jackson. However, Jackson attributed the situation to nothing more than poor timing and an inability to reschedule for a more proper date. Jackson would sign his rookie scale contract on July 3, 2017. During the 2017 NBA Summer League, Jackson recorded averages of 17.4 points, a team high 9.2 rebounds, 1.6 assists, 1.2 steals and 1.0 blocks per game at 35.0 minutes per game in the five games (out of the team's six total) he played there, which earned him All-Summer League First Team honors alongside Lonzo Ball, Dennis Smith Jr., John Collins and Caleb Swanigan.

Jackson made his NBA debut as starting power forward for the Suns on October 18, 2017. During the third game of the season, Jackson made an inappropriate, menacing gesture with his hand towards the fans of the Los Angeles Clippers, which would result in him being fined $35,000 on October 24, 2017. He would start for the Suns at power forward before returning to his more natural small forward position (albeit off the bench) on October 23, 2017, in a win against the Sacramento Kings. On November 29, 2017, Jackson scored a then season-high 20 points in a loss to the Detroit Pistons. Jackson would be put back into a starting position on December 7 at shooting guard after Devin Booker's injury the previous game against the Toronto Raptors. Jackson recorded his first double-double of his professional career on January 7, 2018, with 17 points, and season highs of 10 rebounds and 5 assists in a 114–100 win over the Oklahoma City Thunder. After missing their next game against the Houston Rockets due to a strained right hip, he returned to the starting lineup as a small forward on January 14, recording a new career-high 21 points in a blowout loss to the Indiana Pacers. He tied that career high on January 31 in a 102–88 win over the Dallas Mavericks before putting up a new season high with 23 points on February 4 in a 115–110 loss to the Charlotte Hornets. On his 21st birthday, Jackson would have his best all-around game in his rookie season with 20 points, 7 rebounds, 5 assists, 1 steal and a season-high 4 blocks in a 123–113 loss on the Denver Nuggets. He would break the previous season high in points with 29 scored on February 28 in a 110–102 win against the Memphis Grizzlies. On St. Patrick's Day, Jackson would break that career high with the first 30-point game of his professional career with 36 points scored while coming off the bench in a 124–109 loss against the Golden State Warriors. On March 20, 2018, he would record a double-double of 15 points and a career-high 11 rebounds in a loss to the Detroit Pistons. On May 22, 2018, he was named to the NBA All-Rookie Second Team.

==== 2018–19 season ====
Before being named an NBA All-Rookie Second Team member, Jackson was the team's representative for the 2018 NBA Draft Lottery; the Suns won the #1 pick for the first time in franchise history on May 15, 2018. He later joined the top pick, Deandre Ayton, and the Suns' other rookies and young players for the 2018 NBA Summer League. During the entire pre-season, Jackson was forced into the role of the leading shooting guard, trying to replicate the role of Devin Booker, who was out at the time due to finger surgery. In the season debut on October 17, 2018, Jackson returned to the bench for the team, as he recorded 18 points on 7-of-11 shooting, including 3-of-4 three-point shooting, in a 121–100 blowout win over the Dallas Mavericks.

=== Memphis Grizzlies (2019–2020) ===
On July 7, 2019, the Suns traded Jackson to the Memphis Grizzlies. On September 27, the Grizzlies assigned him to the Memphis Hustle, their NBA G League affiliate, for the start of the season. Jackson played in 26 games for the Hustle before being called up by the Grizzlies, averaging 20.3 points, 7.5 rebounds, 4.3 assists, 1.4 blocks and 1.3 steals per game was named Midseason All-NBA G League for the Western Conference.

=== Detroit Pistons (2020–2022) ===
On December 1, 2020, Jackson signed with his hometown team, the Detroit Pistons. He made his debut for the team on December 23, logging 19 points and six rebounds in a 101–111 loss to the Minnesota Timberwolves. On April 1, 2021, Jackson scored a season-high 31 points, alongside four assists, in a 120–91 win over the Washington Wizards. He ended the 2020–21 season averaging a career-high 13.4 points per game.

On January 3, 2022, Jackson scored a season-high 24 points, alongside five rebounds, in a 115–106 win over the Milwaukee Bucks.

=== Sacramento Kings (2022) ===
On February 10, 2022, Jackson and Trey Lyles were acquired by the Sacramento Kings in a four-team trade that sent Marvin Bagley III to the Pistons. The move reunited Jackson with former Suns teammates Richaun Holmes and Alex Len.

On August 31, 2022, Jackson signed with the Toronto Raptors. He was waived on October 14.

=== Stockton Kings (2023) ===
On January 24, 2023, Jackson signed with the Stockton Kings. He was waived four days later.

== Career statistics ==
Legend
GP	Games played	GS	Games started	MPG	Minutes per game
FG%	Field goal percentage	3P%	3-point field goal percentage	FT%	Free throw percentage
RPG	Rebounds per game	APG	Assists per game	SPG	Steals per game
BPG	Blocks per game	PPG	Points per game	**Bold**	Career high

=== NBA ===
==== Regular season ====
Year	Team	GP	GS	MPG	FG%	3P%	FT%	RPG	APG	SPG	BPG	PPG
2017–18	Phoenix	77	**35**	**25.4**	.417	.263	.634	**4.6**	1.5	**1.0**	.5	13.1
2018–19	Phoenix	**79**	29	25.2	.413	**.324**	.671	4.4	**2.3**	.9	.7	11.5
2019–20	Memphis	22	0	17.3	**.440**	.319	.700	3.0	1.6	.8	.4	9.0
2020–21	Detroit	62	25	25.2	.419	.300	**.729**	4.1	**2.3**	.9	**.8**	**13.4**
2021–22	Detroit	39	3	18.1	.410	.265	.714	3.2	1.3	.5	.5	7.1
2021–22	Sacramento	12	0	10.3	.347	.176	.714	1.5	.4	.4	.3	4.3
Career		291	92	23.1	.416	.292	.680	4.0	1.8	.9	.6	11.3

=== College ===
Year	Team	GP	GS	MPG	FG%	3P%	FT%	RPG	APG	SPG	BPG	PPG
2016–17	Kansas	35	35	30.8	.513	.378	.566	7.4	3.0	1.7	1.1	16.3

== Off the court ==
=== Personal life ===
Jackson was raised by his mother Apples Jones and his stepfather Clarence Jones, who died in 2014 while Jackson was playing in a tournament in Las Vegas. Jackson's mother was a standout basketball player at the University of Texas at El Paso, transferring there after two years at Allen Community College in Kansas, but was only able to play for one season after being ruled academically ineligible for her senior year leading her to leave UTEP and join the U.S. Navy as a parachute rigger. Following Jackson's birth, Jones was invited to participate in the Washington Mystics training camp but eventually decided against participating, instead choosing to raise Jackson in Michigan.

Jackson has cited chess and saxophone as his off the court passions, having started the chess club at Justin-Siena High School and having played the saxophone since he was in the seventh grade.

Jackson was arrested in Miami at a Rolling Loud concert on May 12, 2019, for allegedly attempting to enter the VIP entrance several times and reportedly attempting to evade police while being arrested. He was also suspended from the Memphis Grizzlies G-League team for violating the team's rules.

=== Endorsements ===
On June 21, the day before the 2017 NBA draft, Jackson signed a multi-year endorsement deal with Under Armour. He was later joined by Mavericks guard Dennis Smith Jr. and Thunder guard Terrance Ferguson as members of the 2017 draft class to sign with Under Armour.

=== Vandalism case ===
On February 2, 2017, it was reported by the Kansas City Star that Jackson and Kansas teammate LaGerald Vick were persons of interest in a vandalism case that had occurred the previous December outside a bar in Lawrence. It was alleged that Jackson and Vick had damaged the car of McKenzie Calvert, a KU women's basketball player and Vick's ex-girlfriend. She told police that during the incident outside the bar, Jackson yelled "for her to get out of the car and that he would beat her ass” prior to damaging her car. Following the investigation by police, Jackson was charged with one count of misdemeanor criminal damage to property and was scheduled to be arraigned on April 12. Following the announcement of the charges, Jackson released a statement apologizing for his role in the incident and offered to pay for damages. Following Jackson's charges, KU basketball coach Bill Self stated that Jackson had been disciplined internally by the administration but would not be suspended for any games due to his actions in the incident.

After pleading not guilty to the vandalism charges, Jackson filed for a diversion agreement in Douglas County Court which would last 12 months. As a part of the agreement, Jackson agreed to complete an anger management course, complete community service, abstain from alcohol and drug use during the diversion period, obtain substance abuse evaluation and write a letter of apology to the victims. He also agreed to pay $250 in restitution, $158 to the court and $150 for the cost of diversion. Although Jackson originally pleaded guilty, as a part of the diversion agreement he signed a stipulation of facts matching witness accounts of his actions during the incident. Following the successful completion of the diversion program, Jackson's case would be dismissed by the Douglas County Court. When asked about his progress during an interview on June 13, Jackson told reporters that he was nearly finished with the anger management course and that he had learned from his mistake.
