= Cassius Stanley =

American basketball player (born 1999)

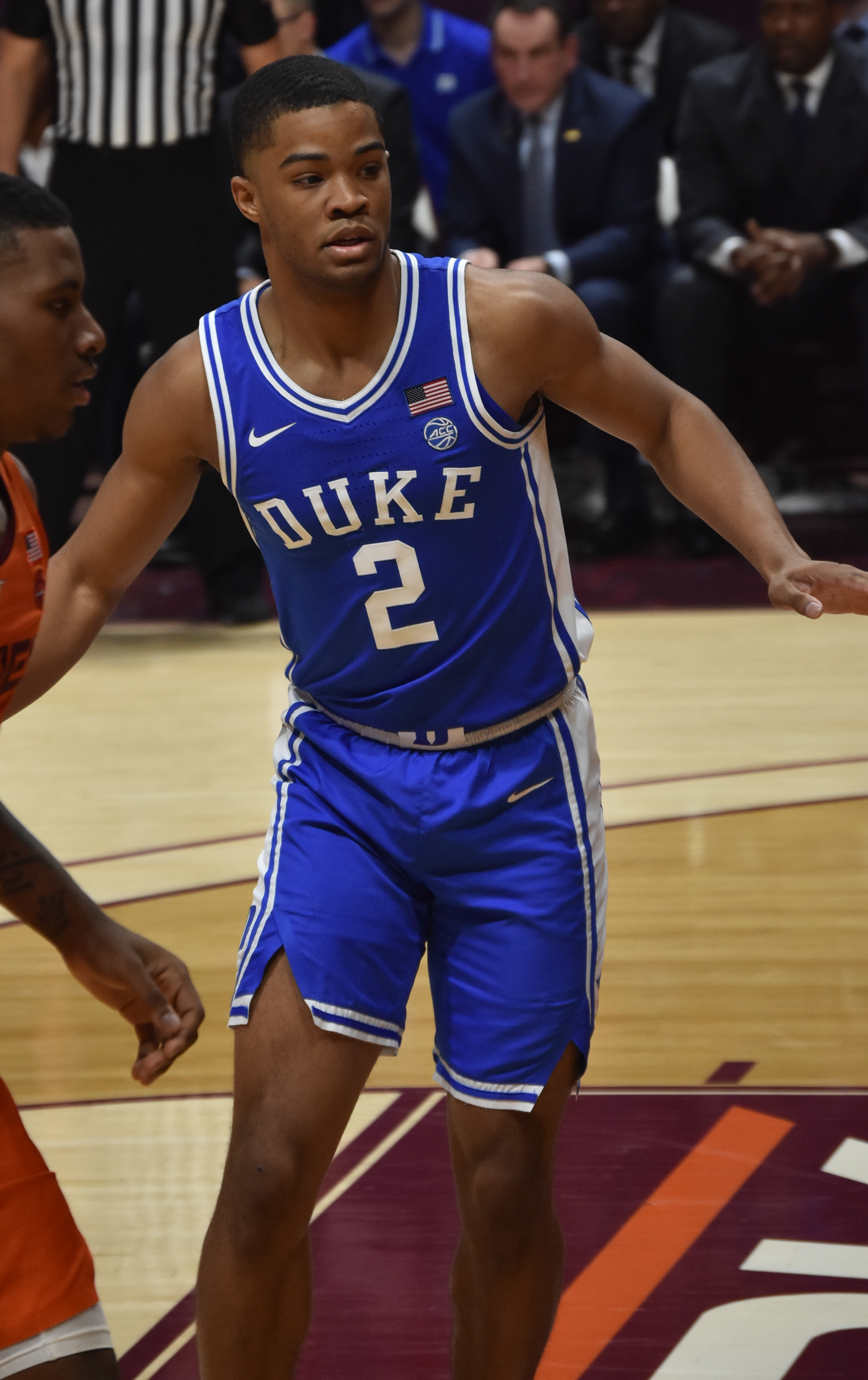
- Stanley with Duke in 2019

Kapfenberg Bulls
- Position: Shooting guard
- League: Austrian Basketball Superliga

Personal information
- Born: August 18, 1999 (age 27) Los Angeles, California, U.S.
- Listed height: 6 ft 5 in (1.96 m)
- Listed weight: 190 lb (86 kg)

Career information
- High school: Harvard-Westlake School (Los Angeles, California); Sierra Canyon (Los Angeles, California)
- College: Duke (2019–2020)
- NBA draft: 2020: 2nd round, 54th overall pick
- Drafted by: Indiana Pacers
- Playing career: 2020–present

Career history
- 2020–2021: Indiana Pacers
- 2021: →Fort Wayne Mad Ants
- 2021–2022: Detroit Pistons
- 2021–2022: →Motor City Cruise
- 2022–2023: Rio Grande Valley Vipers
- 2023–2024: Hapoel Afula
- 2024–2025: Valley Suns
- 2025: ESSM Le Portel
- 2025–2026: Šiauliai
- 2026–present: Kapfenberg Bulls

Career highlights
- ACC All-Freshman Team (2020)
- Stats at NBA.com
- Stats at Basketball Reference

Cassius Jerome Stanley (born August 18, 1999) is an American professional basketball player for the Kapfenberg Bulls of the Austrian Basketball Superliga. He played college basketball for the Duke Blue Devils.

== High school career ==
Stanley first attended Harvard-Westlake School in Studio City, California. As a sophomore, Stanley averaged 17.9 points, 6.8 rebounds, and 3.5 assists per game. In 2017, Stanley transferred to Sierra Canyon School in Chatsworth, California for his last two years of high school. As a senior, he averaged 17.8 points, 6.2 rebounds, and 2.9 assists per game while leading the Sierra Canyon to a 32–3 overall record.

=== Recruiting ===
On April 22, 2019, Stanley committed to play at Duke University.

College recruiting
Name	Hometown	School	Height	Weight	Commit date
Cassius Stanley; SG	Los Angeles, CA	Sierra Canyon (CA)	6 ft 5 in (1.96 m)	185 lb (84 kg)	Apr 22, 2019
Cassius Stanley; SG	Recruit ratings: Rivals: 247Sports: ESPN: (89)				
Overall recruit ranking: Rivals: 39 247Sports: 34 ESPN: 31
Note: In many cases, Scout, Rivals, 247Sports, On3, and ESPN may conflict in their listings of height and weight.; In these cases, the average was taken. ESPN grades are on a 100-point scale.; Sources: "Duke 2019 Basketball Commitments". Rivals.; "2019 Duke Blue Devils Recruiting Class". ESPN.; "2019 Team Ranking". Rivals.

== College career ==
In his college debut, Stanley scored 13 points to help Duke defeat Kansas 68–66. After injuring his leg in a victory over Winthrop on November 29, Stanley was ruled out indefinitely. However, after his leg improved quicker than expected due to rehabilitation and physical therapy, he returned to play against Virginia Tech after missing just one game. On January 4, Stanley scored 20 points and five rebounds in a 95–62 win over Miami. On February 8, Stanley recorded 22 points and six rebounds in a 98–96 overtime victory over rival North Carolina. At the conclusion of the regular season, Stanley was selected to the ACC All-Freshman Team. Stanley averaged 12.6 points and 4.9 rebounds per game, shooting 47 percent from the floor and 36 percent shooting from three-point range. Following the season, he declared for the 2020 NBA draft.

== Professional career ==
=== Indiana Pacers / Fort Wayne Mad Ants (2020–2021) ===
On November 18, 2020, Stanley was drafted in the second round, 54th overall, in the 2020 NBA draft by the Indiana Pacers. The Pacers signed Stanley to a two-way contract with their NBA G League affiliate, the Fort Wayne Mad Ants. He participated in the 2021 Slam Dunk Contest; however, he was eliminated following the opening round.

=== Detroit Pistons / Motor City Cruise (2021–2022) ===
On September 28, 2021, Stanley signed with the Detroit Pistons. On October 16, 2021, Stanley was waived by the Pistons. He was added to the Motor City Cruise in October 2021. Stanley averaged 9.6 points and 4.5 rebounds per game with the Cruise. On December 25, 2021, he signed a 10-day contract with the Detroit Pistons.

On January 4, 2022, Stanley was reacquired by the Motor City Cruise of the NBA G League. On January 8, he signed another 10-day contract with the Pistons. On January 18, 2022, Stanley was reacquired by the Motor City Cruise. On January 21, 2022, Stanley signed a third 10-day contract with the Detroit Pistons and returned to Motor City on January 31.

=== Rio Grande Valley Vipers (2022–2023) ===
On November 3, 2022, Stanley was named to the opening night roster for the Rio Grande Valley Vipers.

=== Hapoel Afula (2023–2024) ===
On September 21, 2023, Stanley signed with Hapoel Afula of the Israeli Basketball Premier League.

=== Valley Suns (2024–2025) ===
On October 27, 2024, Stanley joined the Valley Suns.

=== ESSM Le Portel (2025) ===
On April 9, 2025, he signed with ESSM Le Portel of the LNB Pro A.

=== Šiauliai (2025–2026) ===
On July 23, 2025, Stanley signed with Šiauliai of the Lithuanian Basketball League (LKL). The club released a statement on August 21 that he did not pass his medical examination. On December 18, 2025, Stanley recovered from injury and returned to Šiauliai.

== Career statistics ==
Legend
GP	Games played	GS	Games started	MPG	Minutes per game
FG%	Field goal percentage	3P%	3-point field goal percentage	FT%	Free throw percentage
RPG	Rebounds per game	APG	Assists per game	SPG	Steals per game
BPG	Blocks per game	PPG	Points per game	**Bold**	Career high

=== NBA ===
==== Regular season ====
Year	Team	GP	GS	MPG	FG%	3P%	FT%	RPG	APG	SPG	BPG	PPG
2020–21	Indiana	**24**	0	3.9	.302	.231	.778	.8	.0	.0	.1	1.5
2021–22	Detroit	9	**1**	**17.2**	**.413**	**.235**	**1.000**	**2.1**	**.4**	**.6**	**.2**	**5.8**
Career		33	1	7.5	.360	.233	.895	1.2	.2	.2	.1	2.7

=== College ===
Year	Team	GP	GS	MPG	FG%	3P%	FT%	RPG	APG	SPG	BPG	PPG
2019–20	Duke	29	29	27.4	.474	.360	.733	4.9	1.0	.7	.7	12.6
