= Jamorko Pickett =

American basketball player (born 1997)

No. 5 – Taipei Fubon Braves
- Position: Small forward / power forward
- League: P. League+

Personal information
- Born: December 24, 1997 (age 28) Washington, D.C., U.S.
- Listed height: 6 ft 9 in (2.06 m)
- Listed weight: 206 lb (93 kg)

Career information
- High school: Eastern (Washington, D.C.); Massanutten Military Academy (Woodstock, Virginia)
- College: Georgetown (2017–2021)
- NBA draft: 2021: undrafted
- Playing career: 2021–present

Career history
- 2021–2022: Detroit Pistons
- 2021–2022: →Motor City Cruise
- 2022–2023: Cleveland Charge
- 2023–2024: Grand Rapids Gold
- 2024: Atléticos de San Germán
- 2024–2025: Manisa Basket
- 2025: Calgary Surge
- 2025–2026: Fighting Eagles Nagoya
- 2026–present: Taipei Fubon Braves

Career highlights
- Big East All-Freshman Team (2018)
- Stats at NBA.com
- Stats at Basketball Reference

Jamorko Syuan Pickett (born December 24, 1997) is an American professional basketball player for Taipei Fubon Braves of the Taiwanese P. League+. He played college basketball for the Georgetown Hoyas.

== Early life ==
Pickett grew up in Ward 6 of Washington, D.C.. As a freshman, he attended Spingarn High School but did not play for the basketball team. After his previous school closed, Pickett moved to Eastern High School. He did not qualify for the team in his sophomore season before playing as a junior and assuming a leading role as a senior. Pickett played a postgraduate season at Massanutten Military Academy in Woodstock, Virginia to gain more interest from college programs. A consensus four-star recruit, he initially committed to playing college basketball for Ole Miss before switching his commitment to Georgetown.

== College career ==
During his freshman season, Pickett scored a career-high 21 points two times in losses to Xavier. As a freshman, he averaged 9.6 points and 3.7 rebounds per game, and was named to the Big East All-Freshman Team. Pickett averaged 6.2 points and 3.8 rebounds per game in his sophomore season. As a junior, he averaged 10.2 points and 6.3 rebounds per game. On December 8, 2020, Pickett recorded 19 points and a career-high 18 rebounds in an 80–48 win against Coppin State. He helped Georgetown win its first Big East tournament title since 2007. As a senior, Pickett averaged 12.2 points, 7.2 rebounds and 2.1 assists per game. He chose to forgo his additional year of college eligibility and declare for the 2021 NBA draft.

== Professional career ==
=== Detroit Pistons (2021–2022) ===
After going undrafted in the 2021 NBA draft, Pickett joined the Detroit Pistons for the 2021 NBA Summer League, averaging 9.8 points and 3.8 rebounds in five games. On September 24, 2021, Pickett signed a two-way contract with the Pistons, splitting time with the Motor City Cruise of the NBA G League. On June 28, 2022, the Pistons decided not to renew Pickett's contract.

=== Cleveland Charge (2022–2023) ===
Pickett participated in the 2022 NBA Summer League with the Cleveland Cavaliers.

On October 24, 2022, Pickett joined the Cleveland Charge training camp roster.

=== Grand Rapids Gold (2023–2024) ===
On September 20, 2023, Pickett's rights were traded to the Grand Rapids Gold and on October 13, he signed with the Denver Nuggets. However, he was waived on October 18 and twelve days later, he joined the Grand Rapids Gold.

=== Atléticos de San Germán (2024) ===
On April 1, 2024, Pickett signed with the Atléticos de San Germán of the Baloncesto Superior Nacional.

=== Manisa Basket (2024–2025) ===
On September 3, 2024, Pickett signed with Manisa Basket of the Basketbol Süper Ligi.

=== Calgary Surge (2025) ===
On June 19, 2025, Pickett signed with Calgary Surge of the Canadian Elite Basketball League.

=== Fighting Eagles Nagoya (2025-2026) ===
On August 21, 2025, Pickett signed with Fighting Eagles Nagoya of the B.League.

== Career statistics ==
Legend
GP	Games played	GS	Games started	MPG	Minutes per game
FG%	Field goal percentage	3P%	3-point field goal percentage	FT%	Free throw percentage
RPG	Rebounds per game	APG	Assists per game	SPG	Steals per game
BPG	Blocks per game	PPG	Points per game	**Bold**	Career high

=== NBA ===
Year	Team	GP	GS	MPG	FG%	3P%	FT%	RPG	APG	SPG	BPG	PPG
2021–22	Detroit	13	0	13.5	.360	.333	.500	2.5	.5	.0	.5	3.8
Career		13	0	13.5	.360	.333	.500	2.5	.5	.0	.5	3.8

=== College ===
Year	Team	GP	GS	MPG	FG%	3P%	FT%	RPG	APG	SPG	BPG	PPG
2017–18	Georgetown	30	28	27.5	.363	.357	.745	3.7	1.8	.4	.6	9.6
2018–19	Georgetown	31	23	23.6	.382	.356	.606	3.8	1.1	.8	**1.0**	6.2
2019–20	Georgetown	**32**	**32**	30.9	.383	**.376**	.757	6.3	1.1	.7	.9	10.2
2020–21	Georgetown	26	26	**34.7**	**.385**	.373	**.827**	**7.2**	**2.1**	**1.0**	.6	**12.2**
Career		119	109	29.0	.378	.365	.757	5.2	1.5	.7	.8	9.4
