= Saddiq Bey =

American basketball player (born 1999)

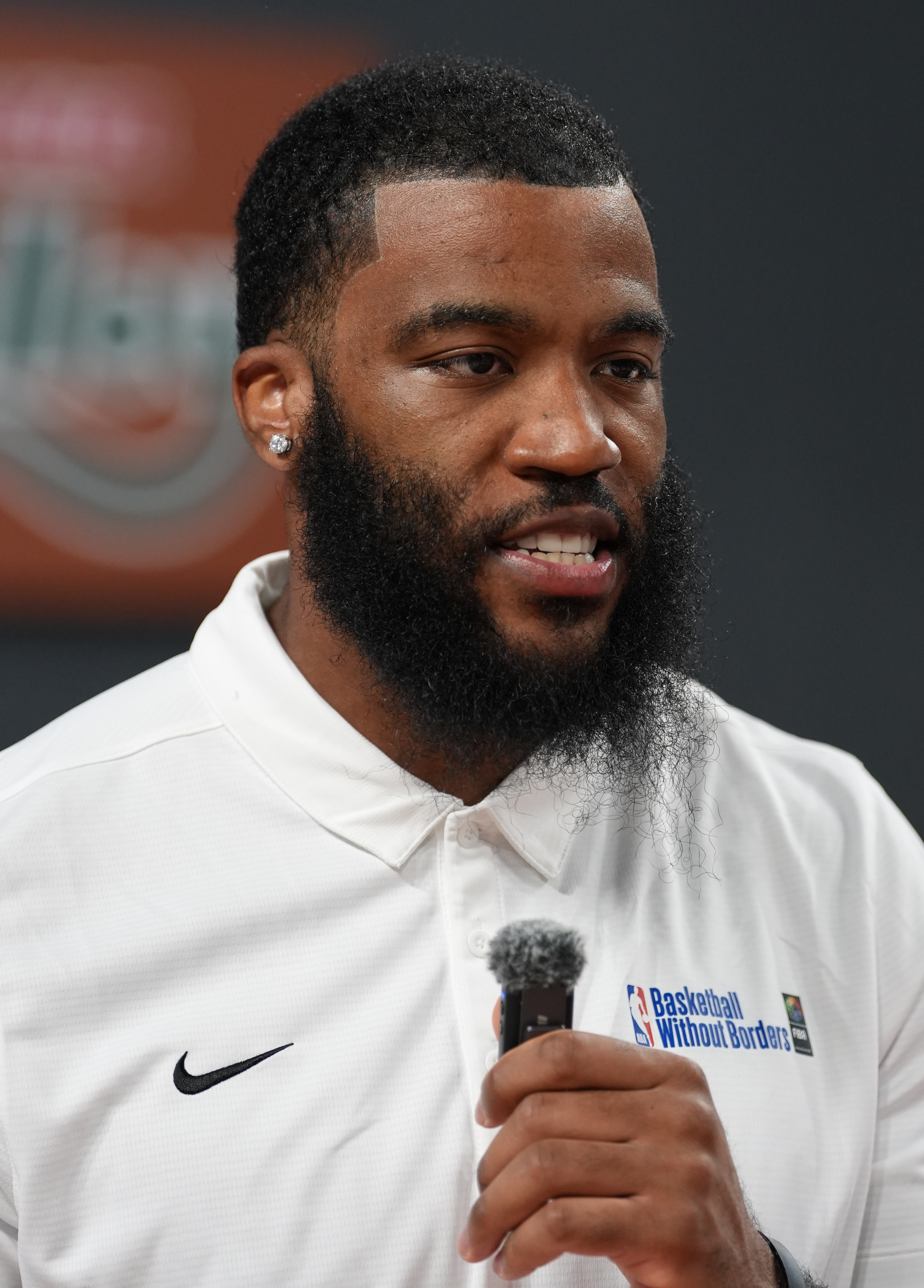
- Bey in 2026

No. 41 – New Orleans Pelicans
- Position: Small forward
- League: NBA

Personal information
- Born: April 9, 1999 (age 27) Charlotte, North Carolina, U.S.
- Listed height: 6 ft 8 in (2.03 m)
- Listed weight: 240 lb (109 kg)

Career information
- High school: DeMatha Catholic (Hyattsville, Maryland); Sidwell Friends School (Washington, D.C.)
- College: Villanova (2018–2020)
- NBA draft: 2020: 1st round, 19th overall pick
- Drafted by: Brooklyn Nets
- Playing career: 2020–present

Career history
- 2020–2023: Detroit Pistons
- 2023–2024: Atlanta Hawks
- 2025–present: New Orleans Pelicans

Career highlights
- NBA All-Rookie First Team (2021); AP honorable mention All-American (2020); Julius Erving Award (2020); First-team All-Big East (2020); Big East All-Freshman Team (2019); Robert V. Geasey Trophy (2020)
- Stats at NBA.com
- Stats at Basketball Reference

Saddiq Jaleel Bey (/səˈdiːk ˈbeɪ/ sə-DEEK BAY; born April 9, 1999) is an American professional basketball player for the New Orleans Pelicans of the National Basketball Association (NBA). He played college basketball for the Villanova Wildcats.

== High school career ==
Bey attended DeMatha Catholic High School his freshman year before transferring to Sidwell Friends School. He played AAU ball with D.C. Premier. He stood 5 feet 9 inches (1.75 m) as a freshman before growing through high school. Bey averaged 14.5 points, 6.5 rebounds, 2 assists and 2 steals per game as a junior to lead Sidwell to a conference championship. He injured his ankle as a senior and missed several games. As a senior, Bey averaged 21 points and eight rebounds per game.

A four-star recruit, Bey was ranked the 83rd-best player in his class by 247Sports.com. Bey originally committed to North Carolina State on November 2, 2017. However, he asked to be released from his letter of intent in May 2018, and was denied a waiver to play in the Atlantic Coast Conference. After visiting Wake Forest, Boston College and Vanderbilt, he signed with Villanova on June 15. Villanova coach Jay Wright had recruited Bey earlier in high school but began targeting him after Omari Spellman left for the NBA and a scholarship became available.

== College career ==
In his debut versus Morgan State, Bey finished with 16 points and four rebounds. In his first six games he averaged a little under 16 points per game. Bey had his first double-double with 16 points and 11 rebounds on January 30, 2019, against DePaul. Villanova won the Big East tournament to become the first team with three straight tournament titles, with Bey contributing 16 points and 10 rebounds in the 74–72 championship against Seton Hall. As a freshman, Bey averaged 8.2 points and 5.1 rebounds per game, starting 29 of 36 games. He was named to the Big East All-Freshman Team.

Coming into his sophomore season, Bey was named to the Julius Erving Award watchlist. On December 4, Bey scored 27 points to lead Villanova to an 80–69 win over Penn. He had a career-high 33 points including eight three-pointers, on January 11, 2020, to help the Wildcats to an 80–66 victory over Georgetown. Bey scored 18 points the following game in a 79–75 overtime win against DePaul. At the conclusion of the regular season, Bey was unanimously selected first-team All-Big East. Bey was named the winner of the Robert V. Geasey Trophy as the top player in the Philadelphia Big 5. Bey won the Julius Erving Award at the end of the season as the nation's top small forward. Bey was the third Villanova player to win the award in the previous six seasons, following Josh Hart in 2017 and Mikal Bridges in 2018. He averaged 16.1 points, 4.7 rebounds, and 2.4 assists per game as a sophomore.

== Professional career ==
=== Detroit Pistons (2020–2023) ===
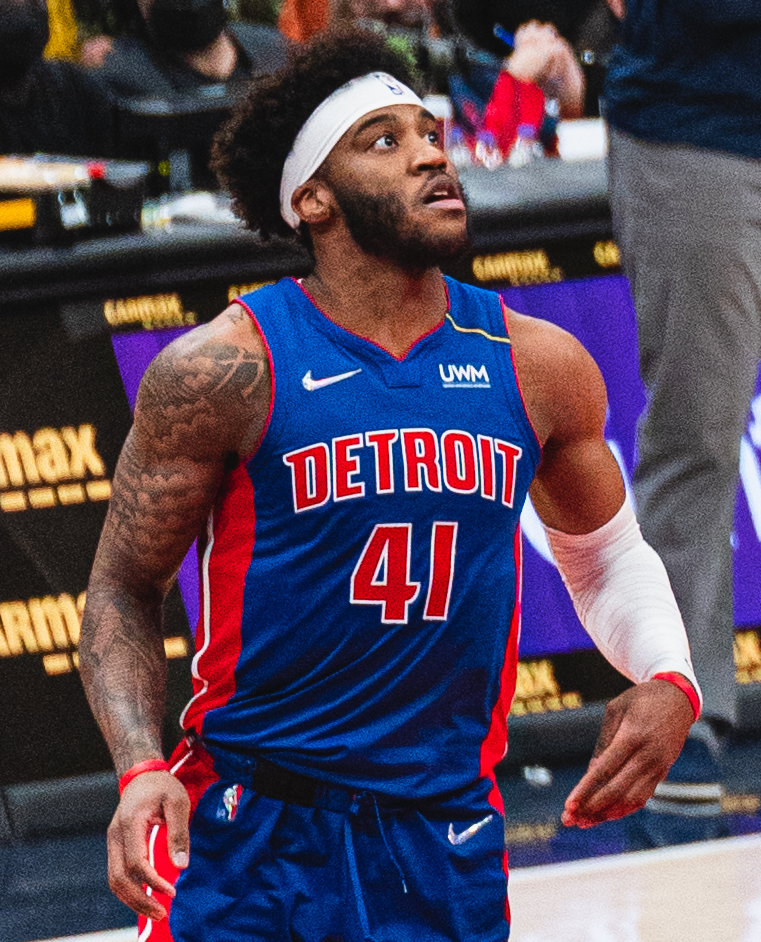
Bey with the Detroit Pistons in 2022

Bey was drafted 19th overall by the Brooklyn Nets in the 2020 NBA draft. The following day, November 19, 2020, the Detroit Pistons acquired the draft rights to Bey in a three-team trade. On December 1, the Pistons announced that they had signed Bey. On February 15, 2021, Bey was named Eastern Conference Player of the Week. Bey finished fourth in Rookie of the Year voting with three third-place votes.

On January 1, 2022, Bey hit a game-winning three-pointer over two defenders in the final seconds of overtime to propel the Pistons to a 117–116 victory over the San Antonio Spurs. Two days later, Bey scored a then-career-high 34 points, along with eight rebounds, leading the Pistons to a 115–106 upset road victory over the defending champion Milwaukee Bucks. On March 17, 2022, Bey scored a career-high 51 points, along with nine rebounds, four assists, and three steals, in a 134–120 win against the Orlando Magic. On March 23, 2022, in a game against the Atlanta Hawks, Bey set a then Pistons franchise record for the most three-pointers made in a season with 192, breaking Allan Houston's previous record of 191.

On January 4, 2023, Bey scored 17 points and made a buzzer-beating, game-winning three-pointer in a 122–119 win over the Golden State Warriors.

=== Atlanta Hawks (2023–2024) ===
On February 9, 2023, Bey was traded to the Atlanta Hawks in a four-team trade involving the Golden State Warriors and Portland Trail Blazers. He made his Hawks debut on February 13, recording 12 points and five rebounds in a 144–138 loss to the Charlotte Hornets.

On January 28, 2024, Bey put up 26 points alongside a game-winning putback dunk in a 126–124 win over the Toronto Raptors. On March 11, Bey suffered an ACL tear that ruled him out for the rest of the season.

=== New Orleans Pelicans (2025–present) ===
On July 12, 2024, Bey signed a three-year, $20 million contract with the Washington Wizards. He was expected to miss most of the season, but was recalled on March 23, 2025 from a rehab stint with the team's G League affiliate, the Capital City Go-Go, for a potential return within a month. On July 6, before ever appearing in a game for the Wizards, Bey, Jordan Poole, and the draft rights to Micah Peavy (40th pick in the 2025 NBA draft) were traded to the New Orleans Pelicans in a three-team trade involving the Houston Rockets who received two second-round picks while the Wizards acquired CJ McCollum, Kelly Olynyk, Cam Whitmore, and a future second-round pick.

On February 26, 2026, Bey recorded 42 points and seven assists in a 129-118 victory over the Utah Jazz. Bey made 72 appearances (including 64 starts) for New Orleans during the 2025–26 NBA season, recording averages of 17.7 points, 5.6 rebounds, and 2.5 assists.

On September 17, 2026, Bey and the Pelicans agreed to a three–year, $55.5 million contract extension.

== Career statistics ==
Legend
GP	Games played	GS	Games started	MPG	Minutes per game
FG%	Field goal percentage	3P%	3-point field goal percentage	FT%	Free throw percentage
RPG	Rebounds per game	APG	Assists per game	SPG	Steals per game
BPG	Blocks per game	PPG	Points per game	**Bold**	Career high
*	Led the league

=== NBA ===
==== Regular season ====
Year	Team	GP	GS	MPG	FG%	3P%	FT%	RPG	APG	SPG	BPG	PPG
2020–21	Detroit	70	53	27.3	.404	.380	.844	4.5	1.4	.7	**.2**	12.2
2021–22	Detroit	**82***	**82***	**33.0**	.396	.346	.827	5.4	**2.8**	.9	**.2**	16.1
2022–23	Detroit	52	30	28.8	.404	.345	.861	4.7	1.6	**1.0**	**.2**	14.8
2022–23	Atlanta	25	7	25.1	**.470**	**.400**	**.862**	4.8	1.4	.8	.0	11.6
2023–24	Atlanta	63	51	32.7	.416	.316	.837	**6.5**	1.5	.8	**.2**	13.7
2025–26	New Orleans	72	64	31.2	.451	.367	.841	5.6	2.5	.9	.1	**17.7**
Career		364	287	30.4	.418	.355	.842	5.3	2.0	.9	.2	14.8

==== Playoffs ====
Year	Team	GP	GS	MPG	FG%	3P%	FT%	RPG	APG	SPG	BPG	PPG
2023	Atlanta	6	0	22.1	.375	.389	.889	4.0	1.0	.5	.0	7.5
Career		6	0	22.1	.375	.389	.889	4.0	1.0	.5	.0	7.5

=== College ===
Year	Team	GP	GS	MPG	FG%	3P%	FT%	RPG	APG	SPG	BPG	PPG
2018–19	Villanova	**36**	29	29.6	.458	.374	.644	**5.1**	1.3	**.9**	.3	8.2
2019–20	Villanova	31	**31**	**33.9**	**.477**	**.451**	**.769**	4.7	**2.4**	.8	**.4**	**16.1**
Career		67	60	31.6	.469	.418	.728	4.9	1.8	.8	.4	11.9

== Personal life ==
Bey is the son of Drewana Bey, a former high school principal who played collegiate basketball at Charlotte.
