= Troy Weaver =

American basketball executive (born 1968)

New Orleans Pelicans
- Position: Executive Vice President of basketball operations
- League: NBA

Personal information
- Born: March 1, 1968 (age 58) Washington, D.C.

Career information
- High school: Archbishop Carroll (Washington, D.C.)
- Coaching career: 1996–2004

Career history

Coaching
- 1996–1999: Pittsburgh (assistant)
- 1999–2000: New Mexico (assistant)
- 2000–2004: Syracuse (assistant)

Troy Weaver (born March 1, 1968) is an American basketball executive. He is the general manager of the New Orleans Pelicans of the National Basketball Association (NBA).

== Early life ==
Weaver attended Archbishop Carroll High School in Washington, D.C. He then attended Prince George's Community College, where he played one season of basketball in 1991.

== Coaching career ==
Prior to his collegiate coaching career, Weaver co-founded the DC Assault of the Amateur Athletic Union (AAU) in 1993. He served as the coach of DC Assault from 1993 to 1996, where he amassed an 85–17 record, and helped lead the team to the 1996 AAU Tournament of Champions.

Weaver served as assistant coach for the Pittsburgh Panthers from 1996 until 1999. He then served as assistant coach for the New Mexico Lobos during the 1999–2000 season. Weaver served as assistant coach for Syracuse from 2000 to 2004. The 2003 Syracuse Orangemen won the 2003 NCAA National Championship, led by Carmelo Anthony, who was recruited by Weaver.

== NBA executive ==
=== Utah Jazz ===
Weaver served as the head scout for the Utah Jazz from 2004 until 2007. He was promoted to director of player personnel of the Jazz for the 2007–08 season.

=== Oklahoma City Thunder ===
On May 9, 2008, Weaver was named assistant general manager for the Oklahoma City Thunder. In his first season with the Thunder in 2008, Weaver pushed for drafting Russell Westbrook with the No. 4 overall pick in the draft, when at the time, Westbrook wasn't projected as an elite prospect. On August 31, 2010, Weaver was promoted to vice president/assistant general manager for the Thunder. He most recently served as vice president of basketball operations during the 2019–20 season.

=== Detroit Pistons ===
On June 18, 2020, Weaver was named the general manager for the Detroit Pistons. During his tenure, the Pistons compiled a combined record of 54–192 in 3 seasons. The Pistons announced that Weaver had stepped down from his position on June 1, 2024.

=== Washington Wizards ===
On June 24, 2024, Weaver was hired to serve as a senior advisor for the Washington Wizards.

=== New Orleans Pelicans ===
On April 23, 2025, Weaver was hired to serve as the general manager for the New Orleans Pelicans.
