= Jalen Duren =

American basketball player (born 2003)

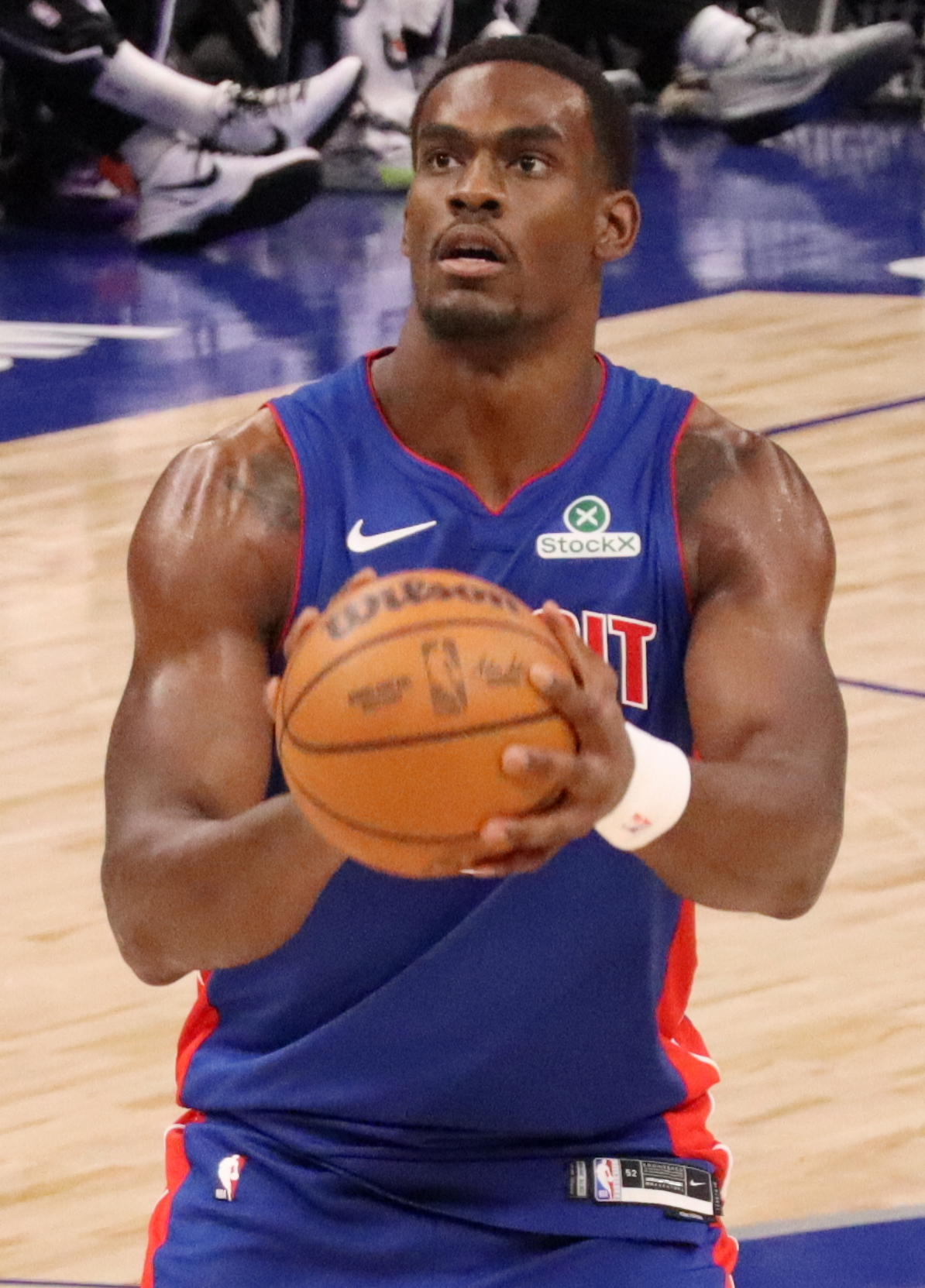
- Duren with the Detroit Pistons in 2026

No. 0 – Detroit Pistons
- Position: Center
- League: NBA

Personal information
- Born: November 18, 2003 (age 22) Sharon Hill, Pennsylvania, U.S.
- Listed height: 6 ft 10 in (2.08 m)
- Listed weight: 250 lb (113 kg)

Career information
- High school: Roman Catholic (Philadelphia, Pennsylvania); Montverde Academy (Montverde, Florida)
- College: Memphis (2021–2022)
- NBA draft: 2022: 1st round, 13th overall pick
- Drafted by: Charlotte Hornets
- Playing career: 2022–present

Career history
- 2022–present: Detroit Pistons

Career highlights
- NBA All-Star (2026); All-NBA Third Team (2026); NBA All-Rookie Second Team (2023); AAC Freshman of the Year (2022); First-team All-AAC (2022); AAC All-Freshman Team (2022)
- Stats at NBA.com
- Stats at Basketball Reference
Medals
Men's basketball
Representing the United States
FIBA Americas U16 Championship
Gold medal – first place	2019 Brazil	Team

Jalen Anthony Duren (/ˈdʌrən/ DURR-ən; born November 18, 2003) is an American professional basketball player for the Detroit Pistons of the National Basketball Association (NBA). A consensus five-star recruit and one of the top players in the 2021 class, he played college basketball for the Memphis Tigers.

Duren was selected with the 13th overall pick by the Charlotte Hornets in the 2022 NBA draft. On draft day, his rights were traded to the New York Knicks and subsequently to the Detroit Pistons. He was named an NBA All-Star and made his first All-NBA Team selection in the 2025–26 NBA season.

== Early life ==
Duren was born in Sharon Hill, Pennsylvania, before his family moved to New Castle, Delaware. He grew up playing football and baseball in addition to basketball, which he ended up focusing on as he grew older and improved his skills. Duren attended Gunning Bedford Middle School in New Castle, where he played on the basketball team and began attracting attention as a 6 ft 5 in (1.96 m) seventh-grader in 2017. He was spotted by Rob Brown, the program director for a Philadelphia-based Amateur Athletic Union (AAU) club called Team Final, who quickly recruited him to the program. By the eighth grade Duren had grown to about 6 ft 8 in (2.03 m), and further grew his profile by leading the 15U Team Final squad to a MADE Hoops League Championship title. Strong showings at the MADE Hoops Middle School Academy and the CP3 Rising Stars Camp that summer solidified his position as one of the top players in his class.

== High school career ==
Duren committed to playing high school basketball at Roman Catholic High School in Philadelphia, along with AAU teammate and highly ranked guard Justice Williams, after having been personally recruited by head coach Matt Griffin. He averaged 12.8 points, 9.3 rebounds and 2.5 blocks per game while shooting 71 percent from the field as a freshman, leading his team to their second consecutive Philadelphia Catholic League title. He earned first-team all-league and second-team all-state honors, and was named a MaxPreps Freshman All-American. That summer he was a standout performer at the 2019 Nike Elite 100 Camp.

Duren averaged 18.1 points, 12.5 rebounds and 3.4 blocks per contest during his second year, leading his team to an 18–10 record. In the first round of the Catholic League playoffs he recorded 18 points and 18 rebounds against Bonner-Prendergast, hitting the game-winning buzzer beater in the 61–59 victory on Valentine's Day. He added 20 points and 18 rebounds in their 83–73 semi-final win over regular season champions Archbishop Wood at the Palestra. They were unable to defend their league crown, though, as they were defeated by Neumann Goretti in the title game; Duren contributed 11 points and 16 rebounds in the 66–58 loss. In the first round of the PIAA class 6A playoffs, they defeated Coatesville 81–75 with Duren posting 13 points and eight rebounds. He recorded 20 points, six rebounds and eight blocks in their 62–51 quarter-final win over Pennridge before play was canceled due to the COVID-19 pandemic. At the end of the year he collected first-team all-league, first-team all-state and MaxPreps Sophomore All-American honors.

For his junior year Duren transferred to Montverde Academy in Montverde, Florida, who was in the process of joining the independent National Interscholastic Basketball Conference (NIBC) with other elite programs like Oak Hill, Wasatch Academy and Sunrise Christian amidst the COVID-19 pandemic. Duren was one of only five underclassmen named to the Sports Illustrated Preseason All-American team. In January 2021, Duren had a strong showing competing against high-level talent at the St. James NIBC Invitational in Washington, D.C., including a SportsCenter Top 10 play against Wasatch Academy where he blocked a shot by catching the ball in mid-air. On March 11, Montverde avenged their only loss of the season by defeating Sunrise Christian 61–57 for the inaugural NIBC championship; Duren finished with 13 points and seven rebounds. He averaged 15.5 points, 10.6 rebounds and 2.4 blocks per game in NIBC conference play, leading the Eagles to a 12–1 league record (20–1 overall). He was also recognized as the 2020–21 MaxPreps Florida High School Basketball Player of the Year.

=== Recruiting ===
Duren overtook Emoni Bates in his junior year as the top prospect in the 2022 recruiting class, surpassing Bates as the number one recruit according to ESPN, 247Sports and Rivals. On August 6, 2021, he reclassified to the 2021 class and committed to playing college basketball for Memphis over offers from Kentucky, Miami (FL), the NBA G League and the Australia NBL.

College recruiting
Name	Hometown	School	Height	Weight	Commit date
Jalen Duren; C	Sharon Hill, PA	Montverde Academy (FL)	6 ft 10 in (2.08 m)	230 lb (100 kg)	Aug 6, 2021
Jalen Duren; C	Recruit ratings: Rivals: 247Sports: ESPN: (97)				
Overall recruit ranking: Rivals: 3 247Sports: 4 ESPN: 7
Note: In many cases, Scout, Rivals, 247Sports, On3, and ESPN may conflict in their listings of height and weight.; In these cases, the average was taken. ESPN grades are on a 100-point scale.; Sources: "Memphis 2021 Basketball Commitments". Rivals.; "2021 Memphis Tigers Recruiting Class". ESPN.; "2021 Team Ranking". Rivals.

== College career ==
On November 19, 2021, Duren scored 19 points, grabbed 19 rebounds and blocked five shots in a 74–62 win against Western Kentucky. He was named to the First Team All-AAC as well as AAC Freshman of the Year. Duren led Memphis to their first NCAA tournament appearance since 2014, leading the Tigers to the round of 32. As a freshman, he averaged 12 points, 8.1 rebounds and 2.1 blocks per game. On April 18, 2022, Duren declared for the 2022 NBA draft, forgoing his remaining college eligibility.

== Professional career ==
=== Detroit Pistons (2022–present) ===
Duren was selected with the 13th overall pick by the Charlotte Hornets in the 2022 NBA draft. On draft day, his rights were traded to the New York Knicks and then to the Detroit Pistons. Duren joined the Pistons' 2022 NBA Summer League roster. In his summer league debut, Duren scored nine points in an 81–78 win against the Portland Trail Blazers. On July 7, 2022, Duren signed a rookie-scale contract with the Pistons.

On October 19, 2022, Duren made his regular season debut, putting up 14 points, 10 rebounds, and three blocks in a 113–109 win over the Orlando Magic. On February 10, 2023, he recorded a double-double with new career highs of 30 points and 17 rebounds in a 138–131 double overtime win against the San Antonio Spurs.

On October 31, 2023, the Pistons exercised their team option to extend his contract for an additional year. On January 28, 2024, Duren put up 22 points and a career-high 21 rebounds in a 120–104 win over the Oklahoma City Thunder.

On April 4, 2025, Duren scored 21 points and recorded 18 rebounds during a 117–105 win over the Toronto Raptors, which secured Detroit's first postseason appearance since 2019.

On November 1, 2025, Duren recorded a double-double with a career-high 33 points and 10 rebounds on 13-of-16 shooting from the field in a 122–110 win over the Dallas Mavericks. On February 1, 2026, Duren was named to his first All-Star Game as an Eastern Conference reserve. On February 27, Duren tied his career-high with 33 points, adding 16 rebounds and three blocks in a 122–119 overtime comeback victory over the Cleveland Cavaliers. He also logged his third career 30+/15+ game, the most by any Pistons player before turning 23. Duren became the first Pistons player since Bob McAdoo in 1980 to record four straight 25+/10+ games, and the youngest in the NBA to do so since Luka Dončić in 2019–20. On May 24, Duren was named to the All-NBA Third Team, earning the first All-NBA selection of his career.

Amid tense contract negotiations with Detroit during the 2026 offseason, which at its height, saw Duren decline a five-year, $200 million fully guaranteed contract extension, he did not attend media day and training camp. According to ESPN's Shams Charania, Duren felt disrespected by the process of the negotiations, citing the inclusion of weight clauses in earlier offers and the handling of teammate Ausar Thompson's own extension. Within hours of the qualifying offer deadline on October 1, Duren agreed to sign the extension.

== National team career ==
Duren played for the United States at the 2019 FIBA Under-16 Americas Championship in Belém, Brazil. He averaged 10.3 points, 8.2 rebounds and two blocks per game en route to a gold medal and a spot on the tournament all-star five team.

== Career statistics ==
Legend
GP	Games played	GS	Games started	MPG	Minutes per game
FG%	Field goal percentage	3P%	3-point field goal percentage	FT%	Free throw percentage
RPG	Rebounds per game	APG	Assists per game	SPG	Steals per game
BPG	Blocks per game	PPG	Points per game	**Bold**	Career high

=== NBA ===
==== Regular season ====
Year	Team	GP	GS	MPG	FG%	3P%	FT%	RPG	APG	SPG	BPG	PPG
2022–23	Detroit	67	31	24.9	.648	.000	.611	8.9	1.1	**.7**	.9	9.1
2023–24	Detroit	61	60	**29.1**	.619	.000	**.790**	**11.6**	2.4	.5	.8	13.8
2024–25	Detroit	**78**	**78**	26.1	**.692**	–	.669	10.3	**2.7**	.7	**1.1**	11.8
2025–26	Detroit	70	70	28.2	.650	–	.747	10.5	2.0	**.8**	.8	**19.5**
Career		276	239	27.0	.652	.000	.715	10.3	2.1	.7	.9	13.5
All-Star		1	0	20.7	.636	–	.333	11.0	3.0	.0	.0	15.0

==== Playoffs ====
Year	Team	GP	GS	MPG	FG%	3P%	FT%	RPG	APG	SPG	BPG	PPG
2025	Detroit	6	6	**33.8**	**.650**	—	**.826**	**10.7**	**3.5**	.3	**1.7**	**11.8**
2026	Detroit	**14**	**14**	30.2	.514	—	.674	8.5	2.1	**.6**	1.2	10.2
Career		20	20	31.3	.550	—	.725	9.2	2.6	.6	1.4	10.7

=== College ===
Year	Team	GP	GS	MPG	FG%	3P%	FT%	RPG	APG	SPG	BPG	PPG
2021–22	Memphis	29	29	25.3	.597	.000	.625	8.1	1.3	.8	2.1	12.0

== Player profile ==
Duren was widely considered the best "true post" player in his high school class by recruiting sites and sportswriters alike. He wields influence in the paint due to his size, strength, athleticism and footwork that allows him to dominate on both sides of the floor. Jake Weingarten, founder of recruiting site StockRisers.com, described him as NBA-ready as a tenth-grader amid reports that the NBA was considering lowering the minimum draft age from 19 to 18.

His physically imposing frame and shot-blocking talent drew comparisons to Bam Adebayo from 247Sports national basketball director Eric Bossi, while his AAU coach Chris Rountree likened him to Marvin Bagley III.
