= 2023–24 Detroit Pistons season =

- Head coach: Monty Williams
- General manager: Troy Weaver
- Owner: Tom Gores
- Arena: Little Caesars Arena

Results
- Record: 14–68 (.171)
- Place: Division: 5th (Central); Conference: 15th (Eastern)
- Playoff finish: Did not qualify
- Stats at Basketball Reference

Local media
- Television: Bally Sports Detroit; WMYD (5 games)
- Radio: WXYT-FM

The 2023–24 Detroit Pistons season was the 83rd season of the franchise, the 76th in the National Basketball Association (NBA), and the seventh in Midtown Detroit. On April 10, 2023, Dwane Casey resigned from his position as head coach and transitioned to the Pistons' front office. This was the Pistons' first and only season under head coach Monty Williams. The Pistons finished with the worst overall record in the NBA for the second consecutive season and worst in the franchise's history at 14–68, surpassing the 1979–80 team that finished at 16–66, and missed the playoffs for the fifth consecutive season.

After the Pistons started the season 2–1, they lost an NBA record 28 games in a row from October 30 to December 30, the longest single-season losing streak and tied for the longest losing streak overall in NBA history. They became the 13th team in NBA history to have a winless month, going 0–15 in November.

The Pistons drew an average home attendance of 18,159 during the season.

== Draft ==
Round	Pick	Player	Position	Nationality	College / Club
1	5	Ausar Thompson	Shooting guard	United States	City Reapers (Overtime Elite)
2	31	James Nnaji	Center	Nigeria	FC Barcelona Bàsquet

The Pistons held the fifth overall pick in the 2023 NBA draft, along with one second-round pick entering the draft. On draft night, the Pistons traded for Marcus Sasser, who was selected by the Memphis Grizzlies with the 25th overall pick and subsequently traded to the Boston Celtics. The 31st pick was traded to the Celtics along with two future second-round picks.

== Roster ==
2023–24 Detroit Pistons roster
Players

Pos.	No.	Player	Height	Weight	DOB	From
G	35	Buddy Boeheim (TW)	6 ft 5 in (1.96 m)	205 lb (93 kg)	1999-11-11	Syracuse
G/F	7	Troy Jr. Brown	6 ft 7 in (2.01 m)	215 lb (98 kg)	1999-07-28	Oregon
G	2	Cade Cunningham	6 ft 6 in (1.98 m)	220 lb (100 kg)	2001-09-25	Oklahoma State
C	0	Jalen Duren	6 ft 10 in (2.08 m)	250 lb (113 kg)	2003-11-18	Memphis
F	18	Tosan Evbuomwan (TW)	6 ft 7 in (2.01 m)	217 lb (98 kg)	2001-02-16	Princeton
G	14	Malachi Flynn	6 ft 1 in (1.85 m)	185 lb (84 kg)	1998-05-09	San Diego State
F	19	Simone Fontecchio	6 ft 7 in (2.01 m)	209 lb (95 kg)	1995-12-09	Italy
G/F	31	Evan Fournier	6 ft 6 in (1.98 m)	205 lb (93 kg)	1992-10-29	France
F/C	67	Taj Gibson	6 ft 9 in (2.06 m)	232 lb (105 kg)	1985-06-25	USC
G	24	Quentin Grimes	6 ft 5 in (1.96 m)	210 lb (95 kg)	2000-05-08	Houston
G	23	Jaden Ivey	6 ft 4 in (1.93 m)	195 lb (88 kg)	2002-02-13	Purdue
F/C	5	Chimezie Metu	6 ft 10 in (2.08 m)	225 lb (102 kg)	1997-03-22	USC
G/F	8	Jared Rhoden (TW)	6 ft 5 in (1.96 m)	210 lb (95 kg)	1999-08-27	Seton Hall
G	25	Marcus Sasser	6 ft 2 in (1.88 m)	195 lb (88 kg)	2000-09-21	Houston
F/C	28	Isaiah Stewart	6 ft 8 in (2.03 m)	250 lb (113 kg)	2001-05-22	Washington
G/F	9	Ausar Thompson	6 ft 6 in (1.98 m)	205 lb (93 kg)	2003-01-30	Pine Crest (FL)
G/F	17	Stanley Umude	6 ft 6 in (1.98 m)	210 lb (95 kg)	1999-04-12	Arkansas
C	13	James Wiseman	6 ft 11 in (2.11 m)	240 lb (109 kg)	2001-03-31	Memphis

Coaches
Head coach
- Monty Williams
Assistant(s)
- Brian Adams
- Mark Bryant
- Dan Burke
- Jarrett Jack
- Jamelle McMillan
- Brian Randle
- Spencer Rivers
- Steve Scalzi
- Stephen Silas

Legend
- (DP) Unsigned draft pick
- (FA) Free agent
- (S) Suspended
- (GL) On assignment to G League affiliate
- (TW) Two-way affiliate player
- Injured

Roster
Updated: April 23, 2024

== Standings ==
=== Division ===
Central Division	W	L	PCT	GB	Home	Road	Div	GP
y – Milwaukee Bucks	49	33	.598	–	31‍–‍11	18‍–‍22	10‍–‍7	82
x – Cleveland Cavaliers	48	34	.585	1.0	26‍–‍15	22‍–‍19	11‍–‍5	82
x – Indiana Pacers	47	35	.573	2.0	26‍–‍15	21‍–‍20	11‍–‍6	82
pi – Chicago Bulls	39	43	.476	10.0	20‍–‍21	19‍–‍22	7‍–‍9	82
Detroit Pistons	14	68	.171	35.0	7‍–‍33	7‍–‍35	2‍–‍14	82

=== Conference ===
Eastern Conference
#	Team	W	L	PCT	GB	GP
1	z – Boston Celtics *	64	18	.780	–	82
2	x – New York Knicks	50	32	.610	14.0	82
3	y – Milwaukee Bucks *	49	33	.598	15.0	82
4	x – Cleveland Cavaliers	48	34	.585	16.0	82
5	y – Orlando Magic *	47	35	.573	17.0	82
6	x – Indiana Pacers	47	35	.573	17.0	82
7	x – Philadelphia 76ers	47	35	.573	17.0	82
8	x – Miami Heat	46	36	.561	18.0	82
9	pi – Chicago Bulls	39	43	.476	25.0	82
10	pi – Atlanta Hawks	36	46	.439	28.0	82
11	Brooklyn Nets	32	50	.390	32.0	82
12	Toronto Raptors	25	57	.305	39.0	82
13	Charlotte Hornets	21	61	.256	43.0	82
14	Washington Wizards	15	67	.183	49.0	82
15	Detroit Pistons	14	68	.171	50.0	82

== Game log ==
=== Preseason ===
2023 preseason game log
Total: 2–2 (Home: 0–1; Road: 2–1)
Preseason: 2–2 (home: 0–1; road: 2–1)

Game	Date	Team	Score	High points	High rebounds	High assists	Location Attendance	Record
1	October 8	Phoenix	L 126–130 (OT)	Marvin Bagley III (25)	Ausar Thompson (10)	Killian Hayes (7)	Little Caesars Arena; 15,062	0–1
2	October 12	@ Oklahoma City	W 128–125	James Wiseman (20)	James Wiseman (10)	Marcus Sasser (8)	Bell Centre; 21,055	1–1
3	October 19	@ Oklahoma City	W 118–116	Ausar Thompson (18)	Ausar Thompson (8)	Cunningham & Sasser (6)	BOK Center; 12,275	2–1
4	October 20	@ Dallas	L 104–114	Malcolm Cazalon (16)	Ausar Thompson (11)	Zavier Simpson (6)	American Airlines Center; 19,282	2–2

2023–24 preseason schedule

=== Regular season ===
2023–24 game log
Total: 14–68 (Home: 7–33; Road: 7–35)
October: 2–2 (home: 1–0; road: 1–2)

Game	Date	Team	Score	High points	High rebounds	High assists	Location Attendance	Record
1	October 25	@ Miami	L 102–103	Cade Cunningham (30)	Duren & Stewart (14)	Cade Cunningham (9)	Kaseya Center; 19,695	0–1
2	October 27	@ Charlotte	W 111–99	Alec Burks (24)	Jalen Duren (17)	Cunningham & Thompson (6)	Spectrum Center; 15,855	1–1
3	October 28	Chicago	W 118–102	Cade Cunningham (25)	Jalen Duren (15)	Cade Cunningham (10)	Little Caesars Arena; 20,062	2–1
4	October 30	@ Oklahoma City	L 112–124	Jaden Ivey (20)	Ausar Thompson (10)	Hayes & Burks (7)	Paycom Center; 16,127	2–2

November: 0–15 (home: 0–8; road: 0–7)

Game	Date	Team	Score	High points	High rebounds	High assists	Location Attendance	Record
5	November 1	Portland	L 101–110	Cade Cunningham (30)	Ausar Thompson (7)	Marcus Sasser (6)	Little Caesars Arena; 16,912	2–3
6	November 2	@ New Orleans	L 116–125	Cade Cunningham (22)	Marvin Bagley III (9)	Cade Cunningham (11)	Smoothie King Center; 15,884	2–4
7	November 5	Phoenix	L 106–120	Cade Cunningham (26)	Jalen Duren (11)	Cade Cunningham (6)	Little Caesars Arena; 20,062	2–5
8	November 6	Golden State	L 109–120	Cunningham & Hayes (21)	Isaiah Stewart (11)	Killian Hayes (7)	Little Caesars Arena; 20,062	2–6
9	November 8	@ Milwaukee	L 118–120	Cade Cunningham (33)	Ausar Thompson (15)	Cade Cunningham (8)	Fiserv Forum; 17,341	2–7
10	November 10	Philadelphia	L 106–114	Killian Hayes (23)	Ausar Thompson (13)	Cade Cunningham (7)	Little Caesars Arena; 18,902	2–8
11	November 12	@ Chicago	L 108–119	Kevin Knox II (18)	Ausar Thompson (16)	Marcus Sasser (6)	United Center; 19,088	2–9
12	November 14	Atlanta	L 120–126	Marvin Bagley III (22)	Marvin Bagley III (11)	Cade Cunningham (12)	Little Caesars Arena; 16,963	2–10
13	November 17	@ Cleveland	L 100–108	Cade Cunningham (20)	Thompson, Knox II & Stewart (10)	Cade Cunningham (8)	Rocket Mortgage FieldHouse; 19,432	2–11
14	November 19	@ Toronto	L 113–142	Stanley Umude (19)	Ausar Thompson (10)	Marcus Sasser (6)	Scotiabank Arena; 19,182	2–12
15	November 20	Denver	L 103–107	Cade Cunningham (27)	Isaiah Stewart (11)	Cade Cunningham (9)	Little Caesars Arena; 19,403	2–13
16	November 24	@ Indiana	L 113–136	Cade Cunningham (31)	Jalen Duren (13)	Cade Cunningham (5)	Gainbridge Fieldhouse; 17,274	2–14
17	November 27	Washington	L 107–126	Cade Cunningham (26)	Jalen Duren (14)	Ivey & Cunningham (7)	Little Caesars Arena; 14,346	2–15
18	November 29	L.A. Lakers	L 107–133	Cade Cunningham (15)	Jalen Duren (7)	Sasser & Hayes (8)	Little Caesars Arena; 20,062	2–16
19	November 30	@ New York	L 112–118	Cade Cunningham (31)	Jalen Duren (12)	Cade Cunningham (8)	Madison Square Garden; 19,812	2–17

December: 1–12 (home: 1–6; road: 0–6)

Game	Date	Team	Score	High points	High rebounds	High assists	Location Attendance	Record
20	December 2	Cleveland	L 101–110	Cade Cunningham (23)	Jalen Duren (12)	Cade Cunningham (11)	Little Caesars Arena; 18,924	2–18
21	December 6	Memphis	L 102–116	Bojan Bogdanović (22)	Jalen Duren (11)	Cade Cunningham (10)	Little Caesars Arena; 12,862	2–19
22	December 8	@ Orlando	L 91–123	Cade Cunningham (21)	Killian Hayes (7)	Cade Cunningham (6)	Amway Center; 18,655	2–20
23	December 11	Indiana	L 123–131	Cade Cunningham (23)	Isaiah Stewart (7)	Cunningham & Hayes (7)	Little Caesars Arena; 14,988	2–21
24	December 13	Philadelphia	L 111–129	Bojan Bogdanović (33)	Ausar Thompson (8)	Cade Cunningham (7)	Little Caesars Arena; 16,749	2–22
25	December 15	@ Philadelphia	L 92–124	James Wiseman (20)	James Wiseman (13)	Ivey & Sasser (4)	Wells Fargo Center; 19,761	2–23
26	December 16	@ Milwaukee	L 114–146	Cade Cunningham (25)	Marvin Bagley III (7)	Cade Cunningham (6)	Fiserv Forum; 17,666	2–24
27	December 18	@ Atlanta	L 124–130	Cade Cunningham (43)	Thompson & Ivey (8)	Cade Cunningham (7)	State Farm Arena; 17,664	2–25
28	December 21	Utah	L 111–119	Cade Cunningham (28)	Isaiah Stewart (10)	Cade Cunningham (10)	Little Caesars Arena; 18,122	2–26
29	December 23	@ Brooklyn	L 115–126	Jaden Ivey (23)	Bojan Bogdanović (8)	Jaden Ivey (7)	Barclays Center; 17,732	2–27
30	December 26	Brooklyn	L 112–118	Cade Cunningham (41)	Jalen Duren (15)	Cade Cunningham (5)	Little Caesars Arena; 19,811	2–28
31	December 28	@ Boston	L 122–128 (OT)	Cade Cunningham (31)	Jalen Duren (14)	Cade Cunningham (9)	TD Garden; 19,156	2–29
32	December 30	Toronto	W 129–127	Cade Cunningham (30)	Jalen Duren (17)	Cade Cunningham (12)	Little Caesars Arena; 18,411	3–29

January: 3–12 (home: 2–7; road: 1–5)

Game	Date	Team	Score	High points	High rebounds	High assists	Location Attendance	Record
33	January 1	@ Houston	L 113–136	Alec Burks (21)	Jalen Duren (14)	Cade Cunningham (10)	Toyota Center; 18,055	3–30
34	January 3	@ Utah	L 148–154 (OT)	Bojan Bogdanović (36)	Jalen Duren (10)	Cade Cunningham (12)	Delta Center; 18,206	3–31
35	January 5	@ Golden State	L 109–113	Cade Cunningham (30)	Jalen Duren (12)	Killian Hayes (5)	Chase Center; 18,064	3–32
36	January 7	@ Denver	L 114–131	Jalen Duren (20)	Duren, Livers & Thompson (5)	Ivey & Hayes (6)	Ball Arena; 19,623	3–33
37	January 9	Sacramento	L 110–131	Bojan Bogdanović (26)	Jalen Duren (10)	Killian Hayes (7)	Little Caesars Arena; 13,992	3–34
38	January 10	San Antonio	L 108–130	Jalen Duren (21)	Jalen Duren (12)	Killian Hayes (12)	Little Caesars Arena; 17,833	3–35
39	January 12	Houston	L 110–112	Knox II & Burks (19)	Duren & Thompson (8)	Ivey & Hayes (8)	Little Caesars Arena; 13,987	3–36
40	January 15	@ Washington	W 129–117	Alec Burks (34)	Jalen Duren (19)	Ivey & Hayes (6)	Capital One Arena; 15,156	4–36
41	January 17	Minnesota	L 117–124	Jaden Ivey (32)	Jalen Duren (11)	Killian Hayes (8)	Little Caesars Arena; 16,022	4–37
42	January 20	Milwaukee	L 135–141	Alec Burks (33)	Duren & Thompson (9)	Ivey & Burks (6)	Little Caesars Arena; 19,996	4–38
43	January 22	Milwaukee	L 113–122	Marcus Sasser (23)	Jalen Duren (12)	Jaden Ivey (6)	Little Caesars Arena; 17,201	4–39
44	January 24	Charlotte	W 113–106	Bojan Bogdanović (34)	Stewart & Duren (8)	Killian Hayes (8)	Little Caesars Arena; 15,020	5–39
45	January 27	Washington	L 104–118	Bojan Bogdanović (30)	Jalen Duren (18)	Cade Cunningham (12)	Little Caesars Arena; 16,922	5–40
46	January 28	Oklahoma City	W 120–104	Jalen Duren (22)	Jalen Duren (21)	Duren & Ivey (6)	Little Caesars Arena; 16,861	6–40
47	January 31	@ Cleveland	L 121–128	Danilo Gallinari (20)	Jalen Duren (9)	Cade Cunningham (7)	Rocket Mortgage FieldHouse; 19,432	6–41

February: 3–8 (home: 0–3; road: 3–5)

Game	Date	Team	Score	High points	High rebounds	High assists	Location Attendance	Record
48	February 2	L.A. Clippers	L 125–136	Jaden Ivey (28)	Jalen Duren (13)	Cade Cunningham (11)	Little Caesars Arena; 19,122	6–42
49	February 4	Orlando	L 99–111	Cunningham & Ivey (18)	Ausar Thompson (7)	Cade Cunningham (7)	Little Caesars Arena; 17,982	6–43
50	February 7	@ Sacramento	W 133–120	Jaden Ivey (37)	Jalen Duren (15)	Killian Hayes (9)	Golden 1 Center; 17,832	7–43
51	February 8	@ Portland	W 128–122 (OT)	Jalen Duren (27)	Jalen Duren (22)	Marcus Sasser (11)	Moda Center; 18,125	8–43
52	February 10	@ L.A. Clippers	L 106–112	Jaden Ivey (23)	Jalen Duren (18)	Cade Cunningham (10)	Crypto.com Arena; 19,370	8–44
53	February 13	@ L.A. Lakers	L 111–125	Ausar Thompson (19)	James Wiseman (9)	Cade Cunningham (7)	Crypto.com Arena; 18,997	8–45
54	February 14	@ Phoenix	L 100–116	Simone Fontecchio (18)	Duren & Milton (9)	Cade Cunningham (8)	Footprint Center; 17,071	8–46
All-Star Game
55	February 22	@ Indiana	L 115–129	Cade Cunningham (30)	Jalen Duren (13)	Cade Cunningham (8)	Gainbridge Fieldhouse; 16,506	8–47
56	February 24	Orlando	L 109–112	Cade Cunningham (26)	Jalen Duren (11)	Jaden Ivey (7)	Little Caesars Arena; 19,388	8–48
57	February 26	@ New York	L 111–113	Cade Cunningham (32)	Jalen Duren (16)	Cade Cunningham (8)	Madison Square Garden; 19,303	8–49
58	February 27	@ Chicago	W 105–95	Cade Cunningham (26)	Jalen Duren (10)	Duren, Ivey & Cunningham (5)	United Center; 21,089	9–49

March: 4–12 (home: 3–7; road: 1–5)

Game	Date	Team	Score	High points	High rebounds	High assists	Location Attendance	Record
59	March 1	Cleveland	L 100–110	Cade Cunningham (21)	Jalen Duren (10)	Cade Cunningham (10)	Little Caesars Arena; 19,299	9–50
60	March 3	@ Orlando	L 91–113	Evan Fournier (17)	Ausar Thompson (6)	Cade Cunningham (7)	Kia Center; 19,459	9–51
61	March 5	@ Miami	L 110–118	Cade Cunningham (23)	Jalen Duren (10)	Cade Cunningham (8)	Kaseya Center; 19,724	9–52
62	March 7	Brooklyn	W 118–112	Jaden Ivey (34)	Jalen Duren (14)	Cade Cunningham (11)	Little Caesars Arena; 19,011	10–52
63	March 9	Dallas	L 124–142	Cade Cunningham (33)	James Wiseman (12)	Cade Cunningham (10)	Little Caesars Arena; 20,062	10–53
64	March 11	Charlotte	W 114–97	Cade Cunningham (22)	Jalen Duren (10)	Cade Cunningham (8)	Little Caesars Arena; 18,003	11–53
65	March 13	Toronto	W 113–104	Jalen Duren (24)	Jalen Duren (23)	Jaden Ivey (7)	Little Caesars Arena; 19,313	12–53
66	March 15	Miami	L 95–108	Simone Fontecchio (24)	Jalen Duren (17)	Ivey & Cunningham (9)	Little Caesars Arena; 19,894	12–54
67	March 17	Miami	L 101–104	Evan Fournier (18)	Jalen Duren (10)	Cade Cunningham (9)	Little Caesars Arena; 20,004	12–55
68	March 18	@ Boston	L 94–119	Jaden Ivey (21)	Jalen Duren (9)	Marcus Sasser (6)	TD Garden; 19,156	12–56
69	March 20	Indiana	L 103–122	Cade Cunningham (23)	Jalen Duren (12)	Cade Cunningham (10)	Little Caesars Arena; 19,897	12–57
70	March 22	Boston	L 102–129	James Wiseman (24)	James Wiseman (9)	Marcus Sasser (7)	Little Caesars Arena; 19,994	12–58
71	March 24	New Orleans	L 101–114	Metu & Flynn (17)	James Wiseman (11)	Ivey & Flynn (4)	Little Caesars Arena; 19,922	12–59
72	March 25	@ New York	L 99–124	Marcus Sasser (24)	James Wiseman (11)	Marcus Sasser (6)	Madison Square Garden; 19,812	12–60
73	March 27	@ Minnesota	L 91–106	Cade Cunningham (32)	Jalen Duren (11)	Marcus Sasser (5)	Target Center; 18,024	12–61
74	March 29	@ Washington	W 96–87	Cade Cunningham (33)	Jalen Duren (17)	Cade Cunningham (7)	Capital One Arena; 15,023	13–61

April: 1–7 (home: 0–2; road: 1–5)

Game	Date	Team	Score	High points	High rebounds	High assists	Location Attendance	Record
75	April 1	Memphis	L 108–110	Cade Cunningham (36)	James Wiseman (10)	Cade Cunningham (8)	Little Caesars Arena; 19,999	13–62
76	April 3	@ Atlanta	L 113–121	Malachi Flynn (50)	Evbuomwan & Flynn (6)	Malachi Flynn (5)	State Farm Arena; 17,899	13–63
77	April 5	@ Memphis	L 90–108	Jaden Ivey (31)	Jalen Duren (10)	Malachi Flynn (6)	FedExForum; 16,745	13–64
78	April 6	@ Brooklyn	L 103–113	Chimezie Metu (20)	Chimezie Metu (7)	Jaden Ivey (10)	Barclays Center; 17,732	13–65
79	April 9	@ Philadelphia	L 102–120	Jaden Ivey (25)	Duren & Metu (11)	Marcus Sasser (5)	Wells Fargo Center; 19,796	13–66
80	April 11	Chicago	L 105–127	Duren & Sasser (20)	Jalen Duren (11)	Jaden Ivey (6)	Little Caesars Arena; 20,013	13–67
81	April 12	@ Dallas	W 107–89	Marcus Sasser (24)	James Wiseman (10)	Ivey & Flynn (5)	American Airlines Center; 20,274	14–67
82	April 14	@ San Antonio	L 95–123	James Wiseman (21)	James Wiseman (17)	Marcus Sasser (7)	Frost Bank Center; 18,516	14–68

2023–24 season schedule

=== In-Season Tournament ===
This was the first regular season where all the NBA teams competed in a mid-season tournament setting due to the implementation of the 2023 NBA In-Season Tournament. During the in-season tournament period, the Pistons competed in Group A of the Eastern Conference, which included the Philadelphia 76ers, Cleveland Cavaliers, Atlanta Hawks and Indiana Pacers. On November 17, the Pistons were eliminated from the in-season tournament following a 100–108 loss to the Cleveland Cavaliers.

==== East group A ====
Pos	Team	Pld	W	L	PF	PA	PD	Qualification	IND	CLE	PHI	ATL	DET
1	Indiana Pacers	4	4	0	546	507	+39	Advance to knockout stage	—	121–116	132–126	157–152	136–113
2	Cleveland Cavaliers	4	3	1	474	445	+29		116–121	—	122–119 (OT)	128–105	108–100
3	Philadelphia 76ers	4	2	2	485	476	+9		126–132	119–122 (OT)	—	126–116	114–106
4	Atlanta Hawks	4	1	3	499	531	−32		152–157	105–128	116–126	—	126–120
5	Detroit Pistons	4	0	4	439	484	−45		113–136	100–108	106–114	120–126	—

Source: NBA
Rules for classification: Tiebreakers

== Player statistics ==
Legend
GP	Games played	GS	Games started	MPG	Minutes per game
FG%	Field-goal percentage	3P%	3-point field-goal percentage	FT%	Free-throw percentage
RPG	Rebounds per game	APG	Assists per game	SPG	Steals per game
BPG	Blocks per game	PPG	Points per game

=== Regular season ===
Detroit Pistons statistics
Player	GP	GS	MPG	FG%	3P%	FT%	RPG	APG	SPG	BPG	PPG
Marvin Bagley III^{†}	26	10	18.4	.591	.167	.820	4.5	1.0	.2	.5	10.2
Buddy Boeheim	10	0	8.4	.310	.320	.800	1.0	.3	.0	.1	3.4
Bojan Bogdanović^{†}	28	27	32.9	.468	.415	.779	3.4	2.5	.8	.1	20.2
Troy Brown Jr.^{†}	22	12	19.0	.296	.281	.867	3.3	1.1	.7	.0	4.2
Alec Burks^{†}	43	0	21.0	.394	.401	.903	2.6	1.6	.5	.3	12.6
Malcolm Cazalon	1	0	3.0				.0	.0	.0	.0	.0
Cade Cunningham	62	62	33.5	.449	.355	.869	4.3	7.5	.9	.4	22.7
Jalen Duren	61	60	29.1	.619	.000	.790	11.6	2.4	.5	.8	13.8
Tosan Evbuomwan^{†}	13	8	22.5	.571	.417	.680	3.5	.8	.5	.3	7.0
Malachi Flynn^{†}	24	0	14.3	.430	.316	.684	1.8	2.1	.8	.1	8.0
Simone Fontecchio^{†}	16	9	30.3	.479	.426	.846	4.4	1.8	.9	.3	15.4
Evan Fournier^{†}	29	0	18.7	.373	.270	.794	1.9	1.6	.9	.2	7.2
Danilo Gallinari^{†}	6	0	15.0	.545	.583	.875	2.3	2.0	.3	.3	8.7
Taj Gibson^{†}	4	0	9.8	.571	.500		2.3	.5	.3	.3	4.5
Quentin Grimes^{†}	6	0	19.2	.214	.143	.909	2.0	2.3	.8	.7	5.3
Joe Harris	16	0	10.6	.359	.333	.500	.8	.6	.2	.1	2.4
Killian Hayes	42	31	24.0	.413	.297	.660	2.8	4.9	.9	.5	6.9
Jaden Ivey	77	61	28.8	.429	.336	.749	3.4	3.8	.7	.5	15.4
Kevin Knox II	31	11	18.1	.462	.330	.909	2.4	.7	.4	.2	7.2
Isaiah Livers	23	6	20.4	.345	.286	.667	2.1	1.1	.6	.2	5.0
Chimezie Metu^{†}	14	7	29.4	.500	.302	.952	6.0	1.9	1.7	.5	10.5
Shake Milton^{†}	4	0	15.8	.423	.333	.667	4.5	1.5	.5	.3	6.8
Monté Morris^{†}	6	0	11.3	.364	.182	.500	2.0	1.3	.2	.2	4.5
Mike Muscala^{†}	13	4	13.2	.341	.382	.500	2.2	.8	.2	.4	3.5
Jaylen Nowell^{†}	4	0	14.5	.522	.333	.667	2.5	.8	.3	.5	7.5
Jared Rhoden	17	0	14.4	.500	.387	.625	1.9	.8	.2	.8	4.9
Marcus Sasser	71	11	19.0	.428	.375	.879	1.8	3.3	.6	.2	8.3
Isaiah Stewart	46	45	30.9	.487	.383	.753	6.6	1.6	.4	.8	10.9
Ausar Thompson	63	38	25.1	.483	.186	.597	6.4	1.9	1.1	.9	8.8
Stanley Umude	24	2	12.8	.440	.453	.906	2.1	.5	.3	.3	5.3
James Wiseman	63	6	17.3	.613	.000	.706	5.3	.9	.2	.6	7.1

- ^{†} Denotes player spent time with another team in the season. Stats reflect time with the Pistons only.

== Transactions ==
=== Overview ===
Players Added

Via draft

- James Nnaji
- Ausar Thompson

Via trade

- Ryan Arcidiacono
- Troy Brown Jr.
- Malachi Flynn
- Simone Fontecchio
- Evan Fournier
- Danilo Gallinari
- Quentin Grimes
- Joe Harris
- Danuel House Jr.
- Shake Milton
- Monté Morris
- Mike Muscala
- Marcus Sasser

Via free agency

- Malcolm Cazalon
- Tosan Evbuomwan
- Taj Gibson
- Kevin Knox II
- Chimezie Metu
- Jaylen Nowell
Players Lost

Via trade

- Marvin Bagley III
- Bojan Bogdanović
- Alec Burks
- Kevin Knox II
- Balša Koprivica
- Isaiah Livers
- Monté Morris
- James Nnaji
- Gabriele Procida

Via free agency

- Cory Joseph
- Rodney McGruder
- Hamidou Diallo

Waived

- Ryan Arcidiacono
- Malcolm Cazalon
- Danilo Gallinari
- R. J. Hampton
- Joe Harris
- Killian Hayes
- Danuel House Jr.
- Shake Milton
- Mike Muscala
- Eugene Omoruyi

=== Trades ===
June 22, 2023	To Detroit Pistons Draft rights to Marcus Sasser	To Boston Celtics Draft rights to James Nnaji; Two future second-round picks
June 30, 2023	To Detroit Pistons Cash considerations	To Los Angeles Clippers Draft rights to Balša Koprivica
July 6, 2023	To Detroit Pistons (United States) Joe Harris; 2027 second-round pick (from Brooklyn via Dallas); 2029 second-round pick (from Brooklyn via Milwaukee)	To Brooklyn Nets Cash considerations
July 6, 2023	To Detroit Pistons (United States) Monté Morris	To Washington Wizards 2027 second-round pick (from Brooklyn or Dallas)
January 14, 2024	To Detroit Pistons (Italy) Danilo Gallinari (United States) Mike Muscala	To Washington Wizards (United States) Marvin Bagley III (United States) Isaiah Livers; 2025 second-round pick 2026 second-round pick
February 8, 2024	To Detroit Pistons (Italy) Simone Fontecchio	To Utah Jazz (United States) Kevin Knox II; Draft rights to Gabriele Procida; Draft considerations
February 8, 2024	To Detroit Pistons (United States) Danuel House Jr. 2024 second-round pick Cash considerations	To Philadelphia 76ers 2028 second-round pick
February 8, 2024	To Detroit Pistons (United States) Ryan Arcidiacono (United States) Malachi Flynn (France) (Algeria) Evan Fournier (United States) Quentin Grimes; Two future second-round picks Cash considerations	To New York Knicks (Croatia) Bojan Bogdanović (United States) Alec Burks
February 8, 2024	To Detroit Pistons (United States) Troy Brown Jr. (United States) Shake Milton; 2030 second-round pick	To Minnesota Timberwolves (United States) Monté Morris

=== Free agency ===
==== Re-signed ====
Date	Player	Ref.
July 11	Isaiah Stewart	

==== Additions ====
Date	Player	Former team	Ref.
July 2	Malcolm Cazalon	(Serbia) Mega MIS	
November 8	Kevin Knox II	Portland Trail Blazers	
February 12	Tosan Evbuomwan	Memphis Grizzlies	
March 6	Taj Gibson	New York Knicks	
March 20	Chimezie Metu	Phoenix Suns	
April 2	Jaylen Nowell	Memphis Grizzlies	

==== Subtractions ====
Date	Player	Reason	New team	Ref.
June 24	R. J. Hampton	Waived	Miami Heat	
July 1	Eugene Omoruyi	Waived	Washington Wizards	
July 6	Cory Joseph	Unrestricted free agent	Golden State Warriors	
September 28	Rodney McGruder	Unrestricted free agent	Golden State Warriors	
October 21	Hamidou Diallo	Unrestricted free agent	Washington Wizards	
February 8	Ryan Arcidiacono	Waived	Windy City Bulls	
February 8	Danilo Gallinari	Waived	Milwaukee Bucks	
February 8	Joe Harris	Waived		
February 8	Killian Hayes	Waived	Brooklyn Nets	
February 8	Danuel House Jr.	Waived		
February 21	Malcolm Cazalon	Waived	Westchester Knicks	
February 28	Mike Muscala	Waived	Oklahoma City Thunder	
March 1	Shake Milton	Waived	New York Knicks	
