= 2026 NBA All-Star Game =

Exhibition basketball game

	1	Total
USA Stars	47	47
USA Stripes	21	21
- Date: February 15, 2026
- Arena: Intuit Dome; Kia Forum (Celebrity Game)
- City: Inglewood
- MVP: Anthony Edwards (USA Stars)
- National anthem: Sarah McLachlan (Canadian); Brandy and June's Diary (American)
- Attendance: 15,973
- Network: NBC; Peacock
- Announcers: Noah Eagle, Reggie Miller, Jamal Crawford, Zora Stephenson and Ashley ShahAhmadi (All-Star Game, All-Star Saturday Night, Rising Stars Tournament); Mark Jones, Richard Jefferson and Monica McNutt (Celebrity Game, ESPN)

Final positions
- Champions: USA Stars
- Runners-up: USA Stripes

NBA All-Star Game
< 2025	2027 >

The 2026 NBA All-Star Game was a round-robin tournament played on February 15, 2026, the 75th edition. It was hosted by the Los Angeles Clippers at the Intuit Dome in Inglewood, California, during the 2025–26 NBA season. It was the seventh NBA All-Star Game to be played in the Los Angeles metropolitan area, the fourth hosted by the Clippers (their first without a co-host), and the first one played in Inglewood since the Los Angeles Lakers hosted it in 1983. The game was televised nationally by NBC for the first time since 2002 and streamed live on Peacock.

It consisted of a three-team round-robin tournament, with the top two teams advancing to a championship game. The teams, two composed of American players (USA Stars and USA Stripes) and one of international players (Team World), were drafted by the league from a pool of twenty-four selected through a voting process. Following the round-robin games, the USA Stripes finished with a 2–0 record, while the USA Stars finished 1–1 to secure the second seed and Team World was eliminated as they went winless at 0–2 against both USA teams. In the championship round, the USA Stars defeated the USA Stripes to win the tournament. Anthony Edwards was named the All-Star Most Valuable Player (MVP).

The surrounding weekend festivities featured the return of the Shooting Stars competition, replacing the Skills Challenge for at least this year.

== Background ==
The announcement for 2026's All-Star Game was made on January 16, 2024, at a press conference held by the Los Angeles Clippers at the then-under-construction Intuit Dome in Inglewood. In attendance at the announcement were NBA commissioner Adam Silver, Clippers chairman Steve Ballmer, Clippers president of business operations Gillian Zucker, Los Angeles mayor Karen Bass, and Inglewood mayor James T. Butts Jr.

During an interview on Fox Sports 1's Breakfast Ball on June 4, 2025, Silver revealed that the game would most likely be played in a format pitting U.S. players against international players. He cited the concurrent 2026 Winter Olympics on NBC and the success of the NHL's 4 Nations Face-Off as influences on the format.

== Format change ==
On November 12, 2025, the NBA announced that the NBA All-Star Game would adopt a new USA vs. the World format. The game would take the form of a round-robin tournament featuring three teams: two composed of American players and one of international players, each consisting of at least eight members. The top two teams based on record would advance to the championship game. In the event of a three-way tie after the third game, point differential would serve as the tiebreaker. All four games would be played with a 12-minute time limit.

== All-Star Game ==
=== Coaches ===
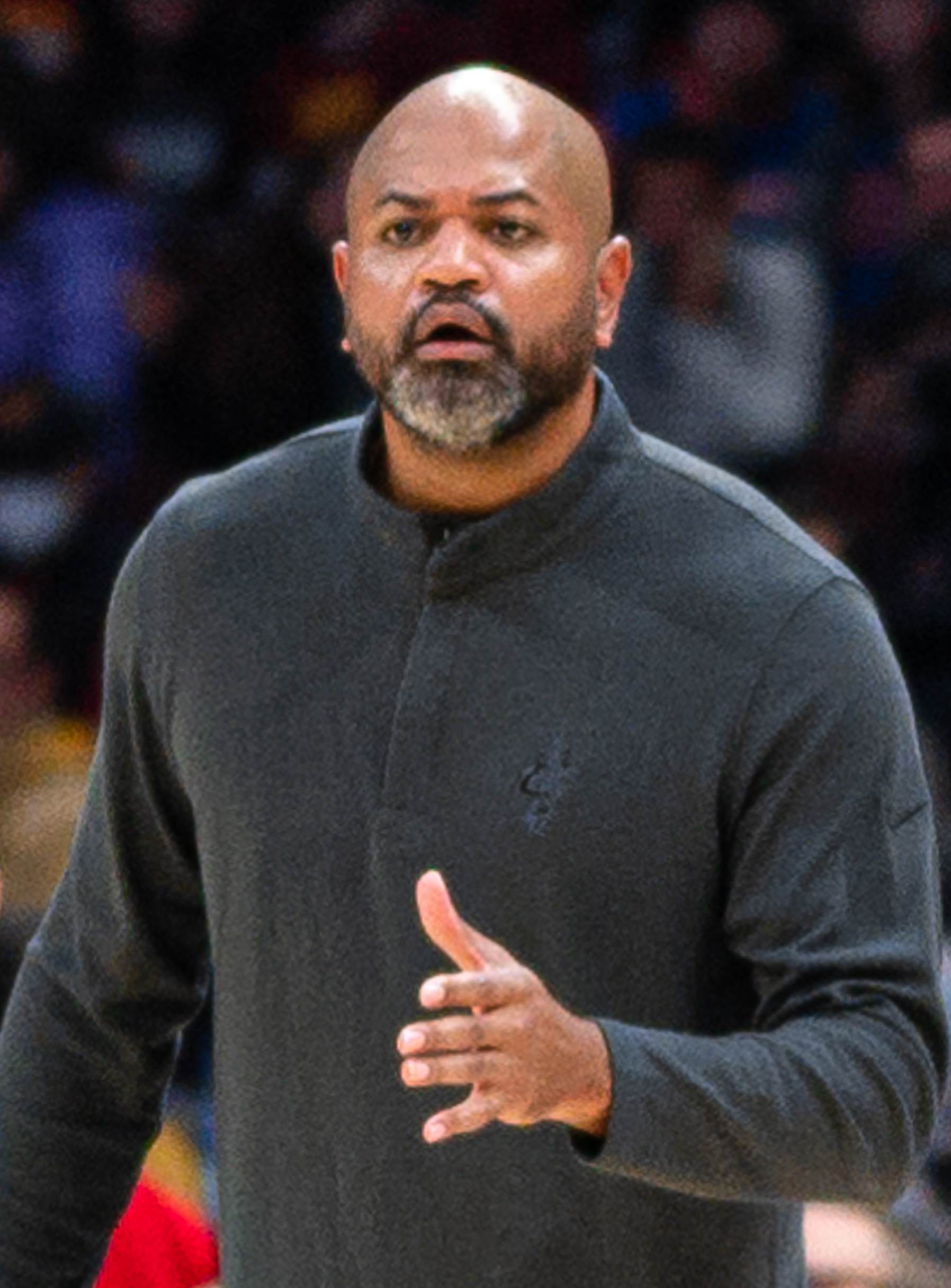
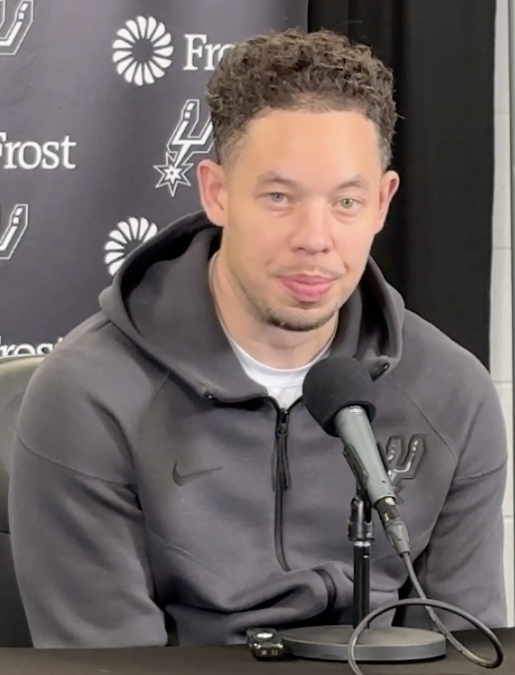
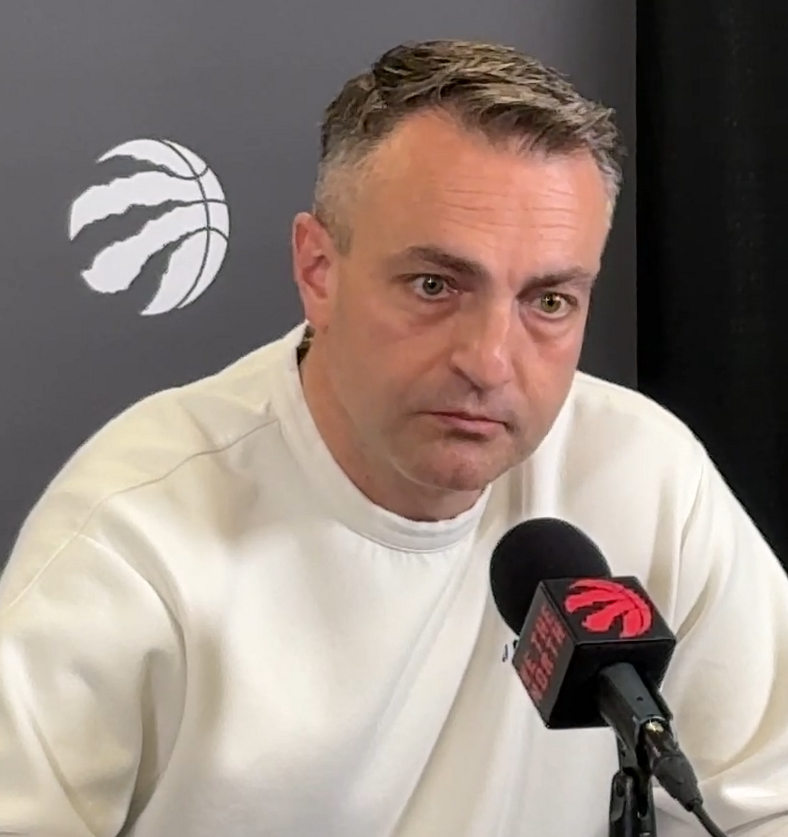
Detroit Pistons' J. B. Bickerstaff, San Antonio Spurs' Mitch Johnson, and Toronto Raptors' Darko Rajaković were selected as the All-Star Game head coaches.

J. B. Bickerstaff, head coach of Eastern Conference leader Detroit Pistons, earned a coaching spot on January 24. Although the Oklahoma City Thunder have the best record in the Western Conference through February 1, their head coach, Mark Daigneault, was ineligible to coach in the All-Star Game because he had coached in the 2025 game and league rules prohibit a coach from coaching in consecutive All-Star Games. Mitch Johnson, head coach of the San Antonio Spurs, earned a coaching spot on February 1. On February 3, it was announced that Darko Rajaković, head coach of the Toronto Raptors, would coach Team World, having the most wins among non-American head coaches in the regular season.

=== Rosters ===
As had been the case in previous years, the rosters for the All-Star Game were selected through a voting process. The fans could vote through the NBA website. The player will be selected, regardless of playing position. The starters will be chosen by the fans, media, and current NBA players. Fans made up 50% of the vote, and NBA players and media each comprised 25% of the vote. The five players who received the highest cumulative vote totals in each conferences were named the All-Star starters. NBA head coaches voted for the reserves for their respective conferences, none of which could be players from their own team. Each coach selected two guards, three frontcourt players and two wild cards, with each selected player ranked in order of preference within each category. If a multi-position player was to be selected, coaches were encouraged to vote for the player at the position that was "most advantageous for the All-Star team", regardless of where the player was listed on the All-Star ballot or the position he was listed in box scores. If the selection process does not yield 16 American players and 8 international players, NBA Commissioner Adam Silver will make the necessary selections to complete the rosters.

The All-Star Game starters were announced on January 19, 2026. Cade Cunningham of the Detroit Pistons, Jalen Brunson of the New York Knicks, and Tyrese Maxey of the Philadelphia 76ers were announced as the starting guards in the East, earning their second, third, and second all-star appearances, respectively. Giannis Antetokounmpo of the Milwaukee Bucks and Jaylen Brown of the Boston Celtics were named the frontcourt starters in the East, earning their tenth and fifth all-star appearances, respectively.

In the West, Shai Gilgeous-Alexander of the Oklahoma City Thunder, Stephen Curry of the Golden State Warriors, and Luka Dončić of the Los Angeles Lakers were named to the starting backcourt, earning their fourth, 12th, and sixth all-star appearances, respectively. In the frontcourt, Victor Wembanyama of the San Antonio Spurs and Nikola Jokić of the Denver Nuggets were named to their second and eighth all-star appearances, respectively.

The All-Star Game reserves were announced on February 1, 2026. The East reserves included Scottie Barnes of the Toronto Raptors, his second selection; Jalen Duren of the Detroit Pistons, his first selection; Jalen Johnson of the Atlanta Hawks, his first selection; Donovan Mitchell of the Cleveland Cavaliers, his seventh selection; Norman Powell of the Miami Heat, his first selection; Pascal Siakam of the Indiana Pacers, his fourth selection; and Karl-Anthony Towns of the New York Knicks, his sixth selection.

The West reserves included Deni Avdija of the Portland Trail Blazers, his first selection; Devin Booker of the Phoenix Suns, his fifth selection; Kevin Durant of the Houston Rockets, his 16th selection; Anthony Edwards of the Minnesota Timberwolves, his fourth selection; Chet Holmgren of the Oklahoma City Thunder, his first selection; LeBron James of the Los Angeles Lakers, his 22nd selection; and Jamal Murray of the Denver Nuggets, his first selection.

On February 3, 2026, NBA Commissioner Adam Silver added Kawhi Leonard to the USA pool, marking his seventh selection. On February 8, Alperen Şengün was selected as an injury replacement for Shai Gilgeous-Alexander. On February 10, it was announced that Brandon Ingram would be the injury replacement for Stephen Curry. On February 12, De'Aaron Fox was named as the injury replacement for Giannis Antetokounmpo; Fox was added to the Team Stripes roster, while Norman Powell was reassigned to Team World.

- Italics indicates leading vote-getters per conference

Eastern Conference All-Stars
Pos	Player	Team	No. of selections
Starters
F/C	Giannis Antetokounmpo^{INJ1}	Milwaukee Bucks	10
G/F	Jaylen Brown	Boston Celtics	5
G	Jalen Brunson	New York Knicks	3
G/F	Cade Cunningham	Detroit Pistons	2
G	Tyrese Maxey	Philadelphia 76ers	2
Reserves
F	Scottie Barnes	Toronto Raptors	2
C	Jalen Duren	Detroit Pistons	1
F	Brandon Ingram^{REP1}	Toronto Raptors	2
F	Jalen Johnson	Atlanta Hawks	1
G	Donovan Mitchell	Cleveland Cavaliers	7
G	Norman Powell	Miami Heat	1
F/C	Pascal Siakam	Indiana Pacers	4
C/F	Karl-Anthony Towns	New York Knicks	6

Western Conference All-Stars
Pos	Player	Team	No. of selections
Starters
G	Stephen Curry^{INJ2}	Golden State Warriors	12
G/F	Luka Dončić	Los Angeles Lakers	6
G/F	Shai Gilgeous-Alexander^{INJ3}	Oklahoma City Thunder	4
C	Nikola Jokić	Denver Nuggets	8
C/F	Victor Wembanyama	San Antonio Spurs	2
Reserves
F	Deni Avdija	Portland Trail Blazers	1
G	Devin Booker	Phoenix Suns	5
F/C	Kevin Durant	Houston Rockets	16
G	Anthony Edwards	Minnesota Timberwolves	4
C/F	Chet Holmgren	Oklahoma City Thunder	1
F	LeBron James	Los Angeles Lakers	22
G/F	Kawhi Leonard^{NOTE1}	Los Angeles Clippers	7
G	Jamal Murray	Denver Nuggets	1
C/F	Alperen Şengün^{REP2}	Houston Rockets	2
G	De'Aaron Fox^{REP3}	San Antonio Spurs	2

^NOTE1 NBA Commissioner Adam Silver added Kawhi Leonard to the USA pool.
^INJ1 Giannis Antetokounmpo was unable to play due to an injury.
^INJ2 Stephen Curry was unable to play due to an injury.
^INJ3 Shai Gilgeous-Alexander was unable to play due to an injury.
^REP1 Brandon Ingram was selected as Stephen Curry's replacement.
^REP2 Alperen Şengün was selected as Shai Gilgeous-Alexander's replacement.
^REP3 De'Aaron Fox was selected as Giannis Antetokounmpo's replacement.

=== Lineups ===
The team lineups were announced on February 3. The players were assigned to the three teams regardless of their positions.

USA Stars
Pos	Player	Team
Starters
G/F	Cade Cunningham	Detroit Pistons
G	Tyrese Maxey	Philadelphia 76ers
G	Devin Booker	Phoenix Suns
G	Anthony Edwards	Minnesota Timberwolves
C	Jalen Duren	Detroit Pistons
Reserves
F	Scottie Barnes	Toronto Raptors
C/F	Chet Holmgren	Oklahoma City Thunder
F	Jalen Johnson	Atlanta Hawks
Head coach: J. B. Bickerstaff (Detroit Pistons)

USA Stripes
Pos	Player	Team
Starters
G/F	Jaylen Brown	Boston Celtics
G	Jalen Brunson	New York Knicks
F	LeBron James	Los Angeles Lakers
G/F	Kawhi Leonard^{NOTE1}	Los Angeles Clippers
F/C	Kevin Durant	Houston Rockets
Reserves
F	Brandon Ingram^{REP1}	Toronto Raptors
G	Donovan Mitchell	Cleveland Cavaliers
G	De'Aaron Fox^{REP3}	San Antonio Spurs
Injured
G	Stephen Curry^{INJ2}	Golden State Warriors
Head coach: Mitch Johnson (San Antonio Spurs)

Team World
Pos	Player	Team
Starters
G/F	(Slovenia) Luka Dončić	Los Angeles Lakers
C	(Serbia) Nikola Jokić	Denver Nuggets
F/C	(France) Victor Wembanyama	San Antonio Spurs
F	(Israel) Deni Avdija	Portland Trail Blazers
G	(Canada) Jamal Murray	Denver Nuggets
Reserves
F/C	(Turkey) Alperen Şengün^{REP2}	Houston Rockets
F/C	(Cameroon) Pascal Siakam	Indiana Pacers
C/F	(Dominican Republic) Karl-Anthony Towns	New York Knicks
G	(Jamaica) Norman Powell	Miami Heat
Injured
F/C	(Greece) Giannis Antetokounmpo^{INJ1}	Milwaukee Bucks
G/F	(Canada) Shai Gilgeous-Alexander^{INJ3}	Oklahoma City Thunder
Head coach: (Serbia) Darko Rajaković (Toronto Raptors)

=== Round-robin games ===
Note: Times are EST (UTC−5) as listed by NBA. The local time of the venue (Los Angeles) is also given (PST, UTC−8).

NBC

February 15, 2026
5:00 p.m. (2:00 p.m. PST)

Recap

Team World 35, USA Stars 37 (OT)
Scoring by quarter: 32–32, Overtime: 3–5
Pts: Victor Wembanyama 14; Rebs: Victor Wembanyama 6 Asts: Jamal Murray 4	Pts: Anthony Edwards 13; Rebs: Scottie Barnes 5 Asts: Devin Booker 4

Intuit Dome, Inglewood, California
Attendance: 15,973
Referees: Sean Wright, Karl Lane, Brent Barnaky

NBC

February 15, 2026
5:55 p.m. (2:55 p.m. PST)

Recap

USA Stars 40, USA Stripes 42
Scoring by quarter: 40–42
Pts: Cunningham, Edwards 11; Rebs: Devin Booker 5 Asts: Cade Cunningham 4	Pts: Jaylen Brown 11; Rebs: Kawhi Leonard 5 Asts: Donovan Mitchell 3

Intuit Dome, Inglewood, California
Attendance: 15,973
Referees: Sean Wright, Karl Lane, Brent Barnaky

NBC

February 15, 2026
6:25 pm. (3:25 p.m. PST)

Recap

Team World 45, USA Stripes 48
Scoring by quarter: 45–48
Pts: Victor Wembanyama 19; Rebs: Pascal Siakam 3 Asts: Jamal Murray 4	Pts: Kawhi Leonard 31; Rebs: Kawhi Leonard 3 Asts: LeBron James 4

Intuit Dome, Inglewood, California
Attendance: 15,973
Referees: Sean Wright, Karl Lane, Brent Barnaky

=== Championship game ===
NBC

February 15, 2026
7:10 p.m. (4:10 p.m. PST)

Recap

USA Stars 47, USA Stripes 21
Scoring by quarter: 47–21
Pts: Tyrese Maxey 9 Rebs: Barnes, Duren, Edwards 4 Asts: Booker, Cunningham, Edwards 2	Pts: Donovan Mitchell 6 Rebs: LeBron James 4 Asts: De'Aaron Fox 2

Intuit Dome, Inglewood, California
Attendance: 15,973
Referees: Sean Wright, Karl Lane, Brent Barnaky

== All-Star Weekend ==
=== Celebrity Game ===
The 2026 NBA All-Star Celebrity Game was held on Friday, February 13, 2026, at the Kia Forum in Inglewood, California. It featured a special halftime performance by CORTIS, marking the first Celebrity Game Halftime performance by a K-pop artist.

ESPN

February 13, 2026
7:00 pm ET

Recap

Team Giannis 65, Team Anthony 58
Scoring by quarter: 14–16, 12–18, 15–8, 24–16

Kia Forum, Inglewood, California

Team Giannis
Player	Background
Cafu	Former soccer player
Jenna Bandy	Influencer
Shams Charania	Sports reporter
Tacko Fall	Former NBA player
Rome Flynn (2)	Actor
Glorilla	Rapper
Keegan-Michael Key	Actor, comedian
Jeremy Lin	Former NBA player
Rick Schnall	Businessman
Amon-Ra St. Brown	Detroit Lions wide receiver
Dylan Wang (3)	Actor
Coaches: Alex Antetokounmpo (Milwaukee Bucks forward), Giannis Antetokounmpo (Milwaukee Bucks forward), Thanasis Antetokounmpo (Milwaukee Bucks forward), Mookie Betts (Los Angeles Dodgers shortstop)

Team Anthony
Player	Background
Keenan Allen	Los Angeles Chargers wide receiver
Badshah	Rapper
Andre De Grasse (2)	Sprinter
Mat Ishbia	Businessman, owner of the Phoenix Suns
Cody Jones	Member of Dude Perfect
Simu Liu (2)	Actor
Mustard	Record producer
Adrien Nunez	Influencer
Taylor Frankie Paul	Influencer
Nicolas Vansteenberghe	Influencer
Jason Williams (3)	Former NBA player
Coaches: Anthony Anderson (actor and comedian), Chris Brickley (NBA player development coach), Lethal Shooter (NBA shooting coach)

=== Rising Stars Challenge ===
Team Austin
Pos.	Player	Team	R/S/P
G	Sean East II	Salt Lake City Stars	G League
C	Yang Hansen	Rip City Remix	G League
G/F	Ron Harper Jr.	Maine Celtics	G League
G	Alijah Martin	Raptors 905	G League
G	Tristen Newton	Rio Grande Valley Vipers	G League
C	Yanic Konan Niederhäuser	San Diego Clippers	G League
G	Jahmir Young^{REP5}	Sioux Falls Skyforce	G League
Injured
F	David Jones Garcia^{INJ1}	Austin Spurs	G League
G	Mac McClung^{REP1} ^{INJ5}	Windy City Bulls	G League
Honorary coach: Austin Rivers
Head coach: Fred Vinson

Team T-Mac
Pos.	Player	Team	R/S/P
G	Bub Carrington^{REP4}	Washington Wizards	Sophomores
G	Tre Johnson	Washington Wizards	Rookies
G/F	Kon Knueppel	Charlotte Hornets	Rookies
F	Zaccharie Risacher^{REP2}	Atlanta Hawks	Sophomores
G	Cam Spencer	Memphis Grizzlies	Sophomores
F	Jaylon Tyson	Cleveland Cavaliers	Sophomores
C	Kel'el Ware	Miami Heat	Sophomores
Injured
G	Ajay Mitchell^{INJ2}	Oklahoma City Thunder	Sophomores
C	Alex Sarr^{INJ4}	Washington Wizards	Sophomores
Honorary coach: Tracy McGrady
Head coach: Luke Walton

Team Melo
Pos.	Player	Team	R/S/P
F	Ace Bailey^{REP3}	Utah Jazz	Rookies
G	Stephon Castle	San Antonio Spurs	Sophomores
C	Donovan Clingan	Portland Trail Blazers	Sophomores
G	Jeremiah Fears	New Orleans Pelicans	Rookies
G	Dylan Harper	San Antonio Spurs	Rookies
C/F	Collin Murray-Boyles	Toronto Raptors	Rookies
G	Reed Sheppard	Houston Rockets	Sophomores
Injured
F	Cooper Flagg^{INJ3}	Dallas Mavericks	Rookies
Honorary coach: Carmelo Anthony
Head coach:

Team Vince
Pos.	Player	Team	R/S/P
F	Carter Bryant^{REP6}	San Antonio Spurs	Rookie
F	Matas Buzelis	Chicago Bulls	Sophomores
G	Egor Dëmin	Brooklyn Nets	Rookies
G	V. J. Edgecombe	Philadelphia 76ers	Rookies
F	Kyshawn George	Washington Wizards	Sophomores
C	Derik Queen	New Orleans Pelicans	Rookies
F	Jaylen Wells	Memphis Grizzlies	Sophomores
Injured
G/F	Cedric Coward^{INJ6}	Memphis Grizzlies	Rookies
Honorary coach: Vince Carter
Head coach: Corliss Williamson

^INJ1 David Jones Garcia was unable to play due to a right ankle injury.
^INJ2 Ajay Mitchell was unable to play due to an abdominal strain.
^INJ3 Cooper Flagg was unable to play due to a left midfoot sprain.
^INJ4 Alex Sarr was unable to play due to a right hamstring sprain.
^INJ5 Mac McClung was unable to play due to a right calf injury.
^INJ6 Cedric Coward was unable to play due to a right knee soreness.
^REP1 Mac McClung was selected as David Jones Garcia's replacement.
^REP2 Zaccharie Risacher was selected as Ajay Mitchell's replacement.
^REP3 Ace Bailey was selected as Cooper Flagg's replacement.
^REP4 Bub Carrington was selected as Alex Sarr's replacement.
^REP5 Jahmir Young was selected as Mac McClung's replacement.
^REP6 Carter Bryant was selected as Cedric Coward's replacement.

Semifinals
February 13 – Inglewood, CA
Team Austin	34
Team Melo	40
February 13 – Inglewood, CA
Team Vince	41
Team T-Mac	36

Final
February 13 – Inglewood, CA
Team Melo	24
Team Vince	25

==== Semifinals ====
Peacock/NBCSN

February 13, 2026
9:00 pm ET

Recap

Team Austin 34, Team Melo 40
Pts: Yanic Konan Niederhäuser (11); Rebs: Ron Harper Jr. (7); Asts: Tristen Newton (4)	Pts: Clingan, Sheppard (9); Rebs: Ace Bailey (3); Asts: Stephon Castle (5)

Intuit Dome, Inglewood, California
Referees: Nate Green, Phenizee Ransom, Matt Myers

Peacock/NBCSN

February 13, 2026
9:55 pm ET

Recap

Team Vince 41, Team T-Mac 36
Pts: V. J. Edgecombe (17); Rebs: V. J. Edgecombe (5); Asts: Buzelis, Dëmin, Queen (2)	Pts: Jaylon Tyson (10); Rebs: Jaylon Tyson (5); Asts: Bub Carrington (3)

Intuit Dome, Inglewood, California
Referees: Nate Green, Phenizee Ransom, Matt Myers

==== Championship game ====
Peacock/NBCSN

February 13, 2026
10:35 pm ET

Recap

Team Vince 25, Team Melo 24
Pts: V. J. Edgecombe (6); Rebs: Derik Queen (5); Asts: Kyshawn George (4)	Pts: Dylan Harper (8); Rebs: Dylan Harper (5); Asts: Castle, Fears, Harper, Sheppard (1)

Intuit Dome, Inglewood, California
Referees: Nate Green, Phenizee Ransom, Matt Myers

=== Three Point Contest ===
Indicates the champion

Rank	P	Player	Team	Height	Weight	3P%	First Round	Final Round
1	G	Damian Lillard	Portland Trail Blazers	6–2	200	—N/a (Note: Damian Lillard did not play a game in the 2025–26 season.)	27	29
2	G	Devin Booker	Phoenix Suns	6–5	206	.311	30	27
3	G/F	Kon Knueppel	Charlotte Hornets	6–6	215	.431	27	17
4	G	Donovan Mitchell	Cleveland Cavaliers	6–2	215	.376	24	DNQ
5	G/F	Norman Powell	Miami Heat	6–3	215	.396	23	DNQ
6	G	Jamal Murray	Denver Nuggets	6–4	215	.425	18	DNQ
7	G	Tyrese Maxey	Philadelphia 76ers	6–2	200	.379	17	DNQ
8	C/F	Bobby Portis Jr.	Milwaukee Bucks	6–9	250	.451	15	DNQ

=== Shooting Stars ===
Indicates the winning team
Indicates the team's legend

Rank	Team	Members	Representing	First Round	Final Round
1	Team Knicks	Jalen Brunson	New York Knicks	31	47
1	Team Knicks	Karl-Anthony Towns	New York Knicks	31	47
1	Team Knicks	Allan Houston	—N/a	31	47
2	Team Cameron	Kon Knueppel	Charlotte Hornets	24	38
2	Team Cameron	Jalen Johnson	Atlanta Hawks	24	38
2	Team Cameron	Corey Maggette	—N/a	24	38
3	Team Harper	Dylan Harper	San Antonio Spurs	18	DNQ
3	Team Harper	Ron Harper Jr.	Boston Celtics / Maine Celtics	18	DNQ
3	Team Harper	Ron Harper Sr.	—N/a	18	DNQ
4	Team All-Star	Scottie Barnes	Toronto Raptors	16	DNQ
4	Team All-Star	Chet Holmgren	Oklahoma City Thunder	16	DNQ
4	Team All-Star	Richard Hamilton	—N/a	16	DNQ

=== Slam Dunk Contest ===
Indicates the champion

#	P	Player	Team	H	W	First Round			Final Round		
#	P	Player	Team	H	W	1	2	T	1	2	T
1	F	Keshad Johnson	Miami Heat	6–6	225	47.4	45.4	92.8	49.6	47.8	97.4
2	F	Carter Bryant	San Antonio Spurs	6–6	220	45.6	49.2	94.8	50.0	43.0	93.0
3	C	Jaxson Hayes	Los Angeles Lakers	7–0	220	44.6	47.2	91.8	DNQ		
4	G	Jase Richardson	Orlando Magic	6–1	180	45.4	43.4	88.8	DNQ		
Judges: Julius Erving, Dominique Wilkins, Dwight Howard, Corey Maggette and Brent Barry

== Media coverage ==
The game was televised live by NBC for the first time since 2002 and streamed live on Peacock. For this year games began at 5 p.m. (EST) to accommodate NBC's coverage of the 2026 Winter Olympics. Noah Eagle (play-by-play), Reggie Miller and Jamal Crawford (analysts) called the All-Star Weekend.
