= Marcus Sasser =

American basketball player (born 2000)

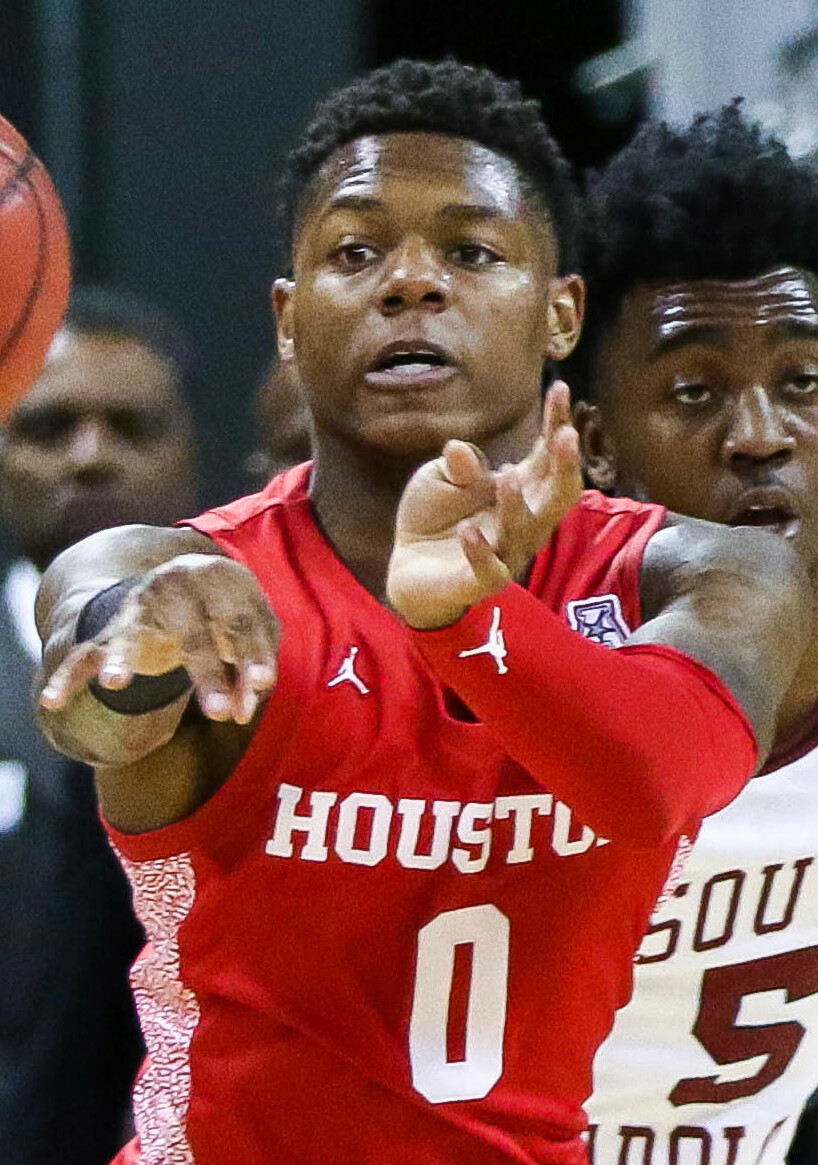
- Sasser with Houston in 2019

No. 8 – Dallas Mavericks
- Position: Shooting guard / point guard
- League: NBA

Personal information
- Born: September 21, 2000 (age 26) Dallas, Texas, U.S.
- Listed height: 6 ft 2 in (1.88 m)
- Listed weight: 195 lb (88 kg)

Career information
- High school: Red Oak (Red Oak, Texas)
- College: Houston (2019–2023)
- NBA draft: 2023: 1st round, 25th overall pick
- Drafted by: Memphis Grizzlies
- Playing career: 2023–present

Career history
- 2023–2026: Detroit Pistons
- 2026–present: Dallas Mavericks

Career highlights
- Consensus first-team All-American (2023); Jerry West Award (2023); AAC Player of the Year (2023); First-team All-AAC (2023); Second-team All-AAC (2021); AAC All-Freshman Team (2020)
- Stats at NBA.com
- Stats at Basketball Reference

Marcus Jerome Sasser Jr. (born September 21, 2000) is an American professional basketball player for the Dallas Mavericks of the National Basketball Association (NBA). He played college basketball for the Houston Cougars.

== High school career ==
Sasser played basketball for Red Oak High School in Red Oak, Texas under the coaching of his uncle, Jason. As a senior, he was named District 14-5A most valuable player and Class 5A All-State. Sasser committed to playing college basketball for Houston over offers from Colorado State, SMU and UTEP.

== College career ==
After struggling at first, Sasser joined Houston's starting lineup in the second half of his freshman season. On February 15, 2020, he scored a season-high 26 points in a 73–72 overtime loss to SMU. As a freshman, Sasser averaged 8.1 points and shot 35.2 percent from three-point range. He was named to the American Athletic Conference (AAC) All-Freshman Team. In his sophomore season debut on November 25, Sasser scored 25 points, making seven three-pointers, in an 89–45 victory over Lamar. On January 9, 2021, he scored 28 points with eight three-pointers in a 71–50 win over Tulane. As a sophomore, Sasser averaged 13.7 points and 2.6 rebounds per game, helping Houston reach the Final Four of the NCAA Tournament. He was named to the Second Team All-AAC. On December 24, 2021, Sasser announced that an injury to his toe would end his 2021–22 season. At the time, he led Houston with 17.7 points per game.

== Professional career ==
=== Detroit Pistons (2023–2026) ===
Sasser drafted 25th overall by the Memphis Grizzlies in the 2023 NBA draft on June 22, 2023. On draft day, Sasser was involved in a three-team trade that sent him and a 2024 first-round pick (who eventually became Bub Carrington) to the Boston Celtics in exchange for Marcus Smart. During the same night, Sasser was traded to the Pistons for James Nnaji, a 2025 second-round pick (later became Noah Penda) and 2026 second-round pick. This trade to the Pistons was finalized five days later on June 28.

Sasser played his NBA debut on October 25, 2023 and recorded 8 points, 2 rebounds and 1 assist as the Pistons suffered a one-point loss to the Miami Heat 102–103. Sasser played in 71 games his rookie year and averaged 8.3 points, 1.8 rebounds and 3.3 assists in 19 minutes per game. However, the 2023 - 2024 year would also be the worst season in Detroit Pistons' history as the team finished with 14 wins and 68 losses.

For his sophomore season, Sasser's playing time decreased as he played in only 57 games and averaged 14.2 minutes per game. Thus, his other stats decreased across the board down from his rookie season to 6.6 points, 1.2 rebounds and 2.3 assists. The Pistons improved their record by 30 wins to 44–38 and reached the playoffs, facing the New York Knicks in the first round. However, Sasser would not see any playing time during the entire series and the Pistons were eventually eliminated in 6 games.

=== Dallas Mavericks (2026–present) ===
On July 8, 2026, Sasser was traded to the Dallas Mavericks as part of a six-team trade. On October 21, he made his debut for the team, scoring 17 points in a 128–110 loss to the Houston Rockets.

== Career statistics ==
Legend
GP	Games played	GS	Games started	MPG	Minutes per game
FG%	Field goal percentage	3P%	3-point field goal percentage	FT%	Free throw percentage
RPG	Rebounds per game	APG	Assists per game	SPG	Steals per game
BPG	Blocks per game	PPG	Points per game	**Bold**	Career high

=== NBA ===
==== Regular season ====
Year	Team	GP	GS	MPG	FG%	3P%	FT%	RPG	APG	SPG	BPG	PPG
2023–24	Detroit	**71**	**11**	**19.0**	.428	.375	**.879**	**1.8**	**3.3**	**.6**	**.2**	**8.3**
2024–25	Detroit	57	1	14.2	**.463**	.382	.843	1.2	2.3	**.6**	.1	6.6
2025–26	Detroit	38	5	12.0	.390	**.415**	.833	1.0	2.0	.5	.1	5.2
Career		166	17	15.8	.431	.386	.859	1.4	2.7	.6	.1	7.0

==== Playoffs ====
Year	Team	GP	GS	MPG	FG%	3P%	FT%	RPG	APG	SPG	BPG	PPG
2026	Detroit	6	0	10.2	.478	.357	—	.8	.5	.5	.0	4.5
Career		6	0	10.2	.478	.357	—	.8	.5	.5	.0	4.5

=== College ===
Year	Team	GP	GS	MPG	FG%	3P%	FT%	RPG	APG	SPG	BPG	PPG
2019–20	Houston	30	17	23.8	.363	.352	.758	2.4	1.7	.6	.1	8.1
2020–21	Houston	29	28	31.9	.380	.335	**.852**	2.6	2.2	1.4	.0	13.7
2021–22	Houston	12	12	**32.0**	.437	**.437**	.744	**2.8**	2.6	**2.2**	.1	**17.7**
2022–23	Houston	**36**	**36**	30.8	**.438**	.384	.848	**2.8**	**3.1**	1.6	**.2**	16.8
Career		107	93	29.3	.406	.369	.824	2.7	2.4	1.3	.1	13.6

== Personal life ==
Sasser's father, Marcus Sr., played basketball for Frank Phillips College. His uncles, Jeryl and Jason, were All-American college players and played in the National Basketball Association (NBA). Sasser's great-grandfather, John Barber, played in the NBA.
