= Ausar Thompson =

American basketball player (born 2003)

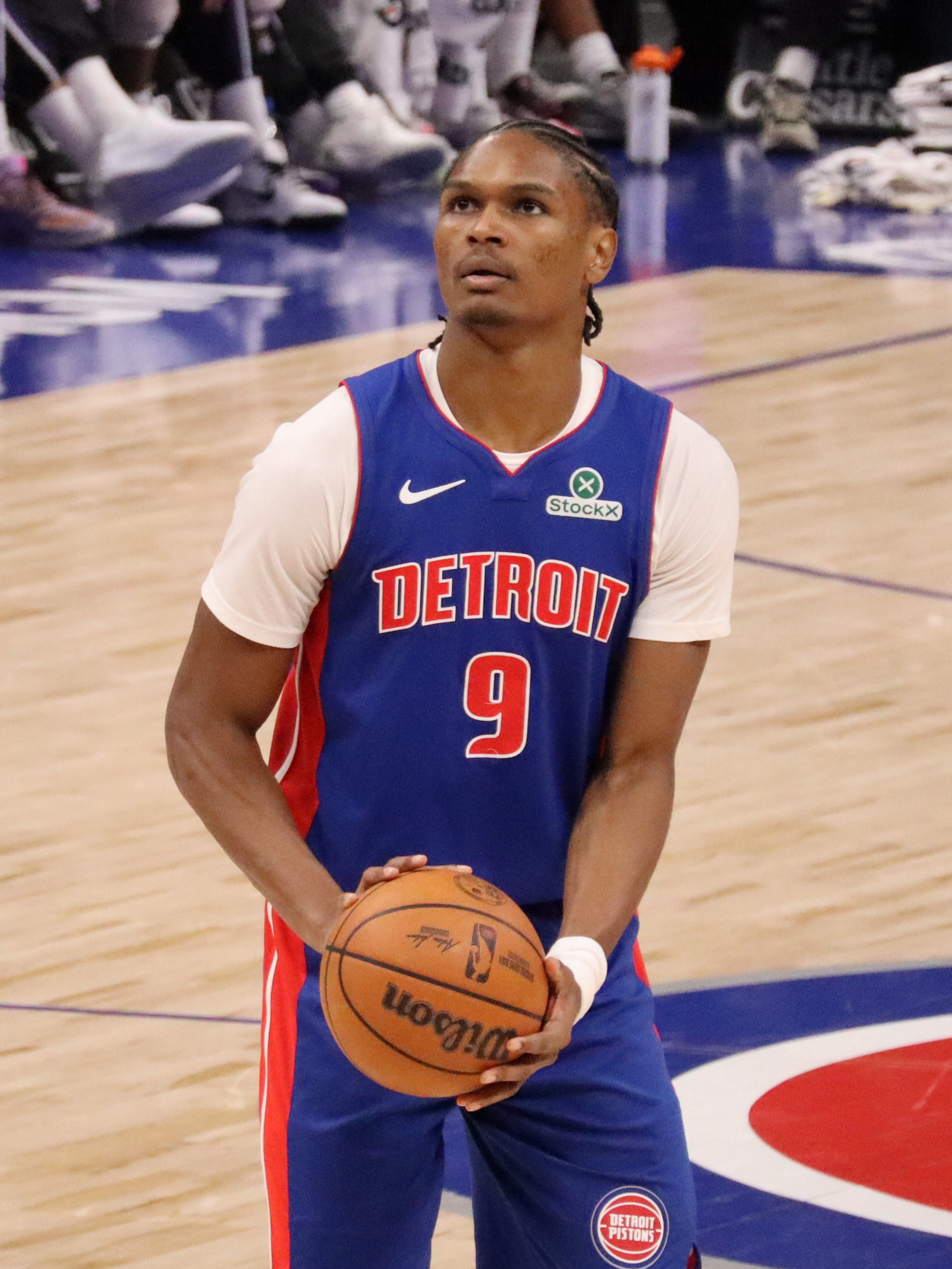
- Thompson with the Detroit Pistons in 2026

No. 9 – Detroit Pistons
- Position: Small forward / shooting guard
- League: NBA

Personal information
- Born: January 30, 2003 (age 23) Oakland, California, U.S.
- Listed height: 6 ft 7 in (2.01 m)
- Listed weight: 205 lb (93 kg)

Career information
- High school: Pine Crest (Fort Lauderdale, Florida)
- NBA draft: 2023: 1st round, 5th overall pick
- Drafted by: Detroit Pistons
- Playing career: 2021–present

Career history
- 2021–2022: Team Elite
- 2022–2023: City Reapers
- 2023–present: Detroit Pistons

Career highlights
- NBA All-Defensive First Team (2026); NBA steals leader (2026); 2× OTE Champion (2022, 2023); 2× OTE Finals MVP (2022, 2023); OTE Most Valuable Player (2023); All-OTE First Team (2023)
- Stats at NBA.com
- Stats at Basketball Reference

Ausar XLNC Thompson (/əˈsɑːr ˈɛksələns ˈtɒmsən/ ə-SAR EK-sə-lənss TOM-sən; born January 30, 2003) is an American professional basketball player for the Detroit Pistons of the National Basketball Association (NBA). He played high school basketball for Pine Crest School in Fort Lauderdale, Florida, where he was rated a five-star recruit and won a state title alongside his twin brother Amen Thompson. He signed with development league Overtime Elite (OTE) out of high school; there, he won two straight OTE titles, earned Finals Most Valuable Player (MVP) twice, and was named league MVP in 2023.

Thompson was selected fifth overall by the Pistons in the 2023 NBA draft. He was the NBA steals leader and made the NBA All-Defensive First Team in the 2025–26 NBA season.

== Early life ==
Thompson was born to Maya Wilson and Troy Thompson and raised in San Leandro, California. He is of Jamaican descent through his father. His identical twin brother, Amen, was born one minute before him; they share the middle name "XLNC" (pronounced "excellence"). Thompson’s older brother, Troy Jr., played college basketball for Prairie View A&M. His uncle, Mark Thompson, represented Jamaica in 400-meter hurdles at the 1992 Summer Olympics. He and Amen began training for basketball under the guidance of their father by age seven and drew inspiration from LeBron James. The twins were homeschooled in sixth and seventh grades to focus on basketball.

== High school career ==
Entering eighth grade, Thompson and his family moved to Fort Lauderdale, Florida so that he and Amen could play high school basketball one year early at Pine Crest School. The twins immediately started for the team. As a sophomore, Thompson averaged 17.3 points, 6.3 rebounds and 2.6 assists per game, earning second-team All-County honors. Entering his junior season, he was named to the Broward County Fab Five by the Sun Sentinel. Thompson averaged 22.6 points, 7.2 rebounds and 3.4 assists per game, helping his team win the Class 4A state championship. He shared Broward County Class 5A-1A co-player of the year with Amen.

=== Recruiting ===
Thompson was rated a five-star recruit by ESPN and Rivals. He gained interest from college programs in 2019, receiving a scholarship offer from Alabama. Following his junior year, Thompson held offers from Alabama, Arizona, Auburn, Arizona State and Kansas, among other programs, before deciding to not play college basketball.

== Professional career ==
=== Team Elite (2021–2022) ===
On May 25, 2021, Thompson signed a two-year contract with Overtime Elite (OTE), a new professional league based in Atlanta with players between ages 16 and 20. He joined the league with his brother Amen, bypassing his final year of high school and college. In the 2021–22 season, Thompson played for Team Elite, one of three teams in the league, and averaged 14.7 points, 8.2 rebounds, 3.0 assists and 2.2 blocks per game. He competed against other OTE teams, as well as prep-school and postgraduate opponents. He led his team to the league championship and was named Finals MVP after recording 20 points and 11 rebounds in a 52–45 win over Team OTE in the decisive third game of the finals. Thompson played for OTE affiliate Team Overtime in The Basketball Tournament in July 2022. His team lost to Omaha Blue Crew, 74–70, in the first round of the tournament.

=== City Reapers (2022–2023) ===
In the 2022–23 OTE season, Thompson was named captain of the City Reapers and played alongside Amen. On December 12, 2022, he earned league Player of the Week honors. Thompson was selected as Player of the Week for a second time on February 6, 2023, after posting a league single-game record 12 assists, with 17 points and eight rebounds in 21 minutes against the Holy Rams. At the end of the regular season, he was named OTE MVP and made the All-OTE First Team, with averages of 16.3 points, 7.1 rebounds, 6.1 assists and 2.4 steals per game. Thompson led the Reapers to the league title in a 3–0 sweep of the YNG Dreamerz, repeating as Finals MVP. In the final game, he made a game-winning three-pointer with three seconds left. On April 21, 2023, he declared for the 2023 NBA draft, where analysts viewed him as a potential top-10 pick.

=== Detroit Pistons (2023–present) ===
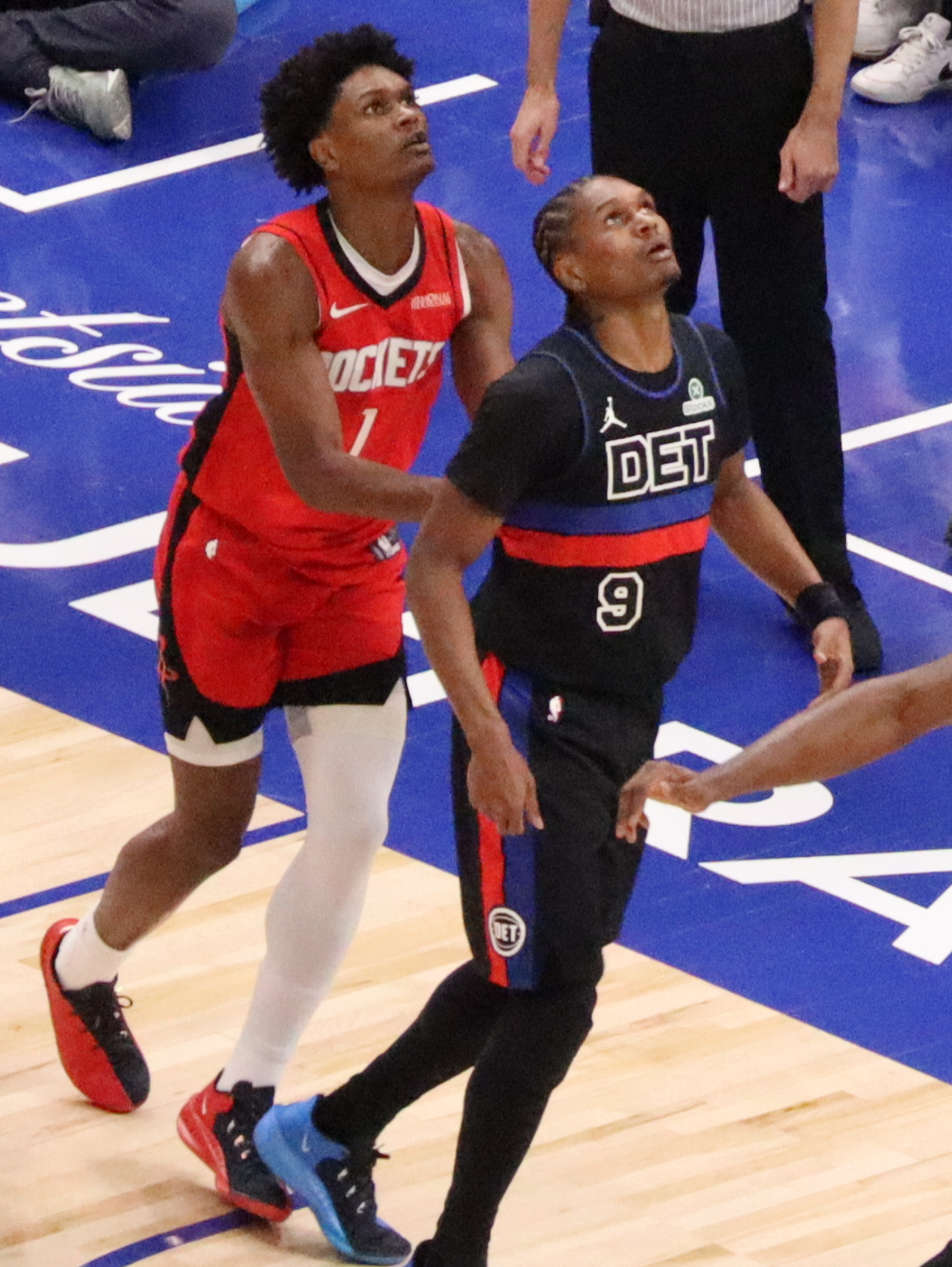
Thompson with the Detroit Pistons in front of his brother Amen Thompson with the Houston Rockets in 2026

The Detroit Pistons selected Thompson with the fifth overall pick in the 2023 NBA draft, one pick behind his twin brother Amen. They were the first brothers in NBA draft history to be selected in the top five in the same year. On October 25, 2023, Thompson made his NBA regular-season debut, putting up four points, seven rebounds, three assists and five blocks in a 103–102 loss to the Miami Heat. Thompson also became the youngest player in NBA history to put up at least five blocks in an NBA debut, at 20 years old and 269 days. Thompson was a part of the roster that lost an NBA record-high 28 straight games in the 2023–24 season. He played in 63 games (38 starts) during his rookie season, averaging 8.8 points, 6.4 rebounds and 1.9 assists. On March 20, 2024, Thompson was shut down for the season after being treated for a blood clot. In 2025 he played in the playoffs for the first time.

During the 2025–26 NBA season, Thompson enjoyed a more regular starting role with the Pistons. He finished the season as the NBA leader in steals and came 3rd in Defensive Player of the Year award voting while also earning himself an NBA All-Defensive First Team selection.

On September 18, 2026, Thompson and the Pistons agreed to a five–year, $155 million contract extension.

== Career statistics ==
Legend
GP	Games played	GS	Games started	MPG	Minutes per game
FG%	Field goal percentage	3P%	3-point field goal percentage	FT%	Free throw percentage
RPG	Rebounds per game	APG	Assists per game	SPG	Steals per game
BPG	Blocks per game	PPG	Points per game	**Bold**	Career high
*	Led the league

=== NBA ===
==== Regular season ====
Year	Team	GP	GS	MPG	FG%	3P%	FT%	RPG	APG	SPG	BPG	PPG
2023–24	Detroit	63	38	25.1	.483	.106	.597	**6.7**	1.9	1.1	**.9**	8.8
2024–25	Detroit	59	48	22.5	**.535**	.224	**.641**	5.1	2.3	1.7	.7	**10.1**
2025–26	Detroit	**73**	**72**	**26.0**	.525	**.250**	.571	5.7	**3.1**	**2.0***	**.9**	9.9
Career		195	158	24.7	.515	.204	.600	5.8	2.5	1.6	.9	9.6

==== Playoffs ====
Year	Team	GP	GS	MPG	FG%	3P%	FT%	RPG	APG	SPG	BPG	PPG
2025	Detroit	6	6	22.5	**.571**	.000	**.583**	5.2	1.0	1.2	.8	**11.5**
2026	Detroit	**14**	**14**	**30.5**	.505	**.143**	.516	**7.9**	**3.1**	**2.0**	**1.8**	8.2
Career		20	20	22.5	.525	.111	.552	7.1	2.5	1.8	1.5	9.2
