= 2024 NBA Summer League =

- League: National Basketball Association
- Sport: Basketball
- Duration: July 12–22
- Games: 76 total games
- Teams: California Classic-6; Salt Lake City-4; Las Vegas-30
- TV partner(s): NBA TV & ESPN

California Classic
- Season champions: Golden State Warriors
- Runners-up: Charlotte Hornets
- Top scorer: Adonis Arms; Ethan Thompson

Salt Lake City Summer League
- Season champions: Oklahoma City Thunder
- Runners-up: Utah Jazz
- Top scorer: Keyonte George

Las Vegas NBA Summer League
- Season champions: Miami Heat
- Runners-up: Memphis Grizzlies
- Season MVP: Jalen Wilson (league); Josh Christopher (championship game)
- Top scorer: Julian Strawther

NBA Summer League seasons
- ← 2023 2025 →

The 2024 NBA Summer League (branded as NBA 2K25 Summer League 2024 for sponsorship reasons) was an off-season competition held by the National Basketball Association (NBA) primarily at the Thomas and Mack Center and Cox Pavilion in Las Vegas, Nevada, on the campus of University of Nevada, Las Vegas from July 12 to 22, 2024. The summer league consisted of the California Classic, Salt Lake City Summer League, and the Las Vegas NBA Summer League.

== California Classic ==
The Sacramento Kings and Golden State Warriors hosted the sixth annual California Classic at Golden 1 Center and Chase Center. The games in Sacramento took place on July 6, 7, and 9 while the games in San Francisco took place on July 6, 7, and 10.

=== Teams ===
- Charlotte Hornets
- Golden State Warriors
- Los Angeles Lakers
- Miami Heat
- Sacramento Kings (Split into team “1” and “2”)
- San Antonio Spurs
- Team China

=== Games ===
==== Day 1 ====
ESPN

July 6
1:30 PM PDT

Boxscore

Los Angeles Lakers 94, Sacramento Kings 108
Scoring by quarter: 18–23, 23–24, 25–32, 28–29
Pts: Blake Hinson 17; Rebs: Colin Castleton 10; Asts: Tommy Kuhse 8	Pts: Adonis Arms 32; Rebs: Adonis Arms 11; Asts: Jordan Ford 6

Chase Center, San Francisco, California
Attendance: 0
Referees: Julian McFadden, Jason Alabanza, Cameron Gelinas

ESPN

July 6
3:30 PM PDT

Boxscore

Miami Heat 66, Golden State Warriors 105
Scoring by quarter: 12–19, 22–31, 11–30, 21–25
Pts: Cole Swider 17; Rebs: Neal Sako 8 Asts: Alondes Williams 3	Pts: Ethan Thompson 27; Rebs: Marques Bolden 13; Asts: Rowe, Spencer 5 each

Chase Center, San Francisco, California
Attendance: 8,837
Referees: Chelisa Painter, Leah Lanie, Ajay Gonnelli

NBA TV

July 6
5:30 PM PDT

Boxscore

Charlotte Hornets 97, San Antonio Spurs 65
Scoring by quarter: 23–9, 20–20, 20–18, 34–18
Pts: Mouhamadou Gueye 21; Rebs: Jake Stephens 8 Asts: Zavier Simpson 8	Pts: Stephon Castle 12; Rebs: Nathan Mensah 10; Asts: Stephon Castle 3

Golden 1 Center, Sacramento, California
Attendance: 0
Referees: Kelsey Reynolds, Erik Aellig, Jafar Kinsey

NBA TV

July 6
7:30 PM PDT

Boxscore

Team China 50, Sacramento Kings 101
Scoring by quarter: 18–31, 11–21, 7–25, 14–24
Pts: Cheng Shuaipeng 16; Rebs: Yu Jiahao 5 Asts: Gao Shiyan, Yang Hansen, Wang Lanqing 2 each	Pts: Mason Jones 19; Rebs: Drew Timme 10; Asts: C. Jones, M. Jones 5 each

Golden 1 Center, Sacramento, California
Attendance: 0
Referees: Mat Rafferty, Ken Jones, Josh Reed

==== Day 2 ====
NBA TV

July 7
1:30 PM PDT

Boxscore

Miami Heat 102, Sacramento Kings 86
Scoring by quarter: 27–20, 29–24, 20–22, 26–20
Pts: Kel'el Ware 26; Rebs: Kel'el Ware 11; Asts: Isaiah Stevens 7	Pts: Jordan Ford 22; Rebs: Fardaws Aimaq 9 Asts: Fardaws Aimaq 5

Chase Center, San Francisco, California
Attendance: 0
Referees: Jason Alabanza, Cameron Gelinas, Ajay Gonnelli

NBA TV

July 7
3:30 PM PDT

Boxscore

Los Angeles Lakers 68, Golden State Warriors 92
Scoring by quarter: 17–31, 17–18, 16–24, 18–19
Pts: Dalton Knecht 12; Rebs: Colin Castleton 10; Asts: Diarra, East, Kuhse 2 each	Pts: Ethan Thompson 22; Rebs: Ethan Thompson 11; Asts: Kevin Knox II 5

Chase Center, San Francisco, California
Attendance: 9,674
Referees: Chelisa Painter, Julian McFadden, Leah Lanie

ESPN2

July 7
5:00 PM PDT

Boxscore

Team China 62, Charlotte Hornets 93
Scoring by quarter: 9–26, 18–17, 19–21, 16–29
Pts: Yang Hansen 12; Rebs: Zhu Mingzhen 5 Asts: Liao Sanning 4	Pts: Bryce McGowens 20; Rebs: 4 players 4 each Asts: Zavier Simpson 4

Golden 1 Center, Sacramento, California
Attendance: 0
Referees: Matt Rafferty, Josh Reed, Jafar Kinsey

ESPN2

July 7
7:00 PM PDT

Boxscore

San Antonio Spurs 59, Sacramento Kings 85
Scoring by quarter: 19–23, 15–21, 17–20, 8–21
Pts: Ingram, Ward 11 each Rebs: Nathan Mensah 7 Asts: Jamaree Bouyea 4	Pts: Boogie Ellis 17; Rebs: Jo Lual-Acuil 8 Asts: Mason Jones 5

Golden 1 Center, Sacramento, California
Attendance: 0
Referees: Ken Jones, Kelsey Reynolds, Kinsey Jafar

==== Day 3 ====
NBA TV

July 9
5:00 PM PDT

Boxscore

San Antonio Spurs 89, Team China 67
Scoring by quarter: 29–20, 18–24, 17–7, 25–16
Pts: Stephon Castle 18; Rebs: Harrison Ingram 10; Asts: Bouyea, Castle, Massalski 5	Pts: Liao Sanning 17; Rebs: Yang Hansen 8 Asts: Gao Shiyan, Liao Sanning 3

Golden 1 Center, Sacramento, California
Attendance: 0
Referees: Kelsey Reynolds, Matt Rafferty, Josh Reed

NBA TV

July 9
7:00 PM PDT

Boxscore

Charlotte Hornets 86, Sacramento Kings 82
Scoring by quarter: 20–17, 20–28, 24–9, 22–28
Pts: Bryce McGowens 29; Rebs: Jake Stephens 10; Asts: Leaky Black, Zavier Simpson 3	Pts: Jo Lual-Acuil 19; Rebs: Jo Lual-Acuil, Xavier Sneed 9 Asts: Antoine Davis 5

Golden 1 Center, Sacramento, California
Attendance: 0
Referees: Ken Jones, Erik Aellig, Jafar Kinsey

==== Day 4 ====
ESPN2

July 10
4:00 PM PDT

Boxscore

Miami Heat 80, Los Angeles Lakers 76
Scoring by quarter: 21–21, 15–19, 23–18, 21–18
Pts: Keshad Johnson, Alondes Williams 21; Rebs: Alondes Williams 9 Asts: Josh Christopher 4	Pts: Dalton Knecht 20; Rebs: Colin Castleton 11; Asts: Tommy Kuhse, Maxwell Lewis 5

Chase Center, San Francisco, California
Attendance: 0
Referees: Jason Alabanza, Chelisa Painter, Ajay Gonnelli

NBA TV

July 10
7:00 PM PDT

Boxscore

Sacramento Kings 90, Golden State Warriors 91
Scoring by quarter: 17–30, 21–29, 27–16, 25–16
Pts: Keon Ellis 30; Rebs: Colby Jones 12; Asts: Isaac Jones 8	Pts: Kevin Knox II 19; Rebs: Marques Bolden, Trayce Jackson-Davis 6 Asts: Marques Bolden, Yuri Collins, Brandin Podziemski 4

Chase Center, San Francisco, California
Attendance: 5,196
Referees: Julian McFadden, Cameron Gelinas, Leah Lanie

== Salt Lake City Summer League ==
The Utah Jazz hosted a round-robin tournament at the Delta Center on July 8-10.

=== Teams ===
- Utah Jazz
- Oklahoma City Thunder
- Memphis Grizzlies
- Philadelphia 76ers

=== Games ===
==== Day 1 ====
ESPN

July 8
5:00 PM MDT

Boxscore

Oklahoma City Thunder 92, Philadelphia 76ers 102
Scoring by quarter: 26–26, 25–32, 18–18, 23–26
Pts: Adam Flagler 18; Rebs: Dillon Jones 10; Asts: Dillon Jones 7	Pts: Ricky Council IV 29; Rebs: Aluma, Council IV 8 each Asts: Dowtin, Hampton 4 each

Delta Center, Salt Lake City, Utah
Attendance: 0
Referees: Italo Araujo, Gina Catanzariti, RJ Johnson

ESPN

July 8
7:00 PM MDT

Boxscore

Memphis Grizzlies 95, Utah Jazz 97 (OT)
Scoring by quarter: 27–17, 25–24, 14–27, 24–22, Overtime: 5–7
Pts: Scotty Pippen Jr. 21; Rebs: Zach Edey 15; Asts: Scotty Pippen Jr. 5	Pts: Keyonte George 30; Rebs: Darius Bazley 9 Asts: Isaiah Collier 6

Delta Center, Salt Lake City, Utah
Attendance: 8,572
Referees: Julian Scott, Cam Garber, Kastine Evans

==== Day 2 ====
ESPN

July 9
5:00 PM MDT

Boxscore

Memphis Grizzlies 87, Philadelphia 76ers 85
Scoring by quarter: 17–31, 32–18, 16–18, 22–18
Pts: Jaylen Wells 27; Rebs: Trey Jemison 11; Asts: Cam Spencer 8	Pts: Jeff Dowtin 18; Rebs: David Jones 10; Asts: Jeff Dowtin 6

Delta Center, Salt Lake City, Utah
Attendance: 0
Referees: Italo Araujo, Julian Scott, RJ Johnson

ESPN2

July 9
7:00 PM MDT

Boxscore

Oklahoma City Thunder 98, Utah Jazz 75
Scoring by quarter: 29–16, 29–24, 19–14, 21–21
Pts: Dillon Jones 21; Rebs: Kylor Kelley 8 Asts: Ajay Mitchell 10	Pts: Kenneth Lofton Jr., Brice Sensabaugh 18; Rebs: Darius Bazley 8 Asts: Kenneth Lofton Jr. 4

Delta Center, Salt Lake City, Utah
Attendance: 8,583
Referees: Gina Catanzariti, Cam Garber, Kastine Evans

==== Day 3 ====
NBA TV

July 10
5:00 PM MDT

Boxscore

Memphis Grizzlies 77, Oklahoma City Thunder 80
Scoring by quarter: 20–19, 13–15, 18–18, 26–28
Pts: Trey Jemison 20; Rebs: DeJon Jarreau, Trey Jemison 8 Asts: Scotty Pippen Jr. 5	Pts: Ajay Mitchell 21; Rebs: Keyontae Johnson 7 Asts: Ousmane Dieng 8

Delta Center, Salt Lake City, Utah
Attendance: 0
Referees: Cam Garber, Italo Araujo, Julian Scott

ESPN2

July 10
7:00 PM MDT

Boxscore

Philadelphia 76ers 85, Utah Jazz 93
Scoring by quarter: 18–19, 26–15, 22–33, 19–26
Pts: Ricky Council IV 20; Rebs: Adem Bona 6 Asts: Jeff Dowtin 6	Pts: Keyonte George 31; Rebs: Walker Kessler 15; Asts: Keyonte George 5

Delta Center, Salt Lake City, Utah
Attendance: 8,908
Referees: Gina Catanzariti, Kastine Evans, RJ Johnson

== Las Vegas Summer League ==
The Las Vegas NBA Summer League is an official summer league of the NBA—the eighteenth year it has been held. The league played games across two venues: the Thomas and Mack Center and Cox Pavilion, both located in Paradise, Nevada, which is near Las Vegas.

=== Format ===
- Number of Games: A total of 76 games will be played, each team will play at least five games, and each team will play four games from July 12–19.
- Four-Team Tournament: After each team plays four games, the top four teams will advance to the playoffs and participate in a semifinal game on July 21, and the two semifinal game winners will participate in the championship game on July 22. The top four playoff seeds will be determined by winning percentage with tiebreakers set forth below.
- Consolation Games: The 26 teams that did not advance to the four-team playoff will play a fifth game on either July 20 or July 21.

==== Tiebreak criteria ====
Two teams tied

In the case of a tie in preliminary round records involving only two teams, the following criteria, in order, were utilized:

- Head-to-head matchup: The team that won the game between the two teams in the preliminary round, if applicable, receives the higher seed.
- Point differential: The team with the greater point differential receives the higher seed.
- Total points: The team with the most total points will receive the higher seed
- Random drawing: If necessary, the higher seed will be determined by a "coin flip".

More than two teams tied

In the case of a tie in preliminary round records involving more than two teams, the following criteria, in order, were utilized:

- Point differential: The team with the greater point differential receives the higher seed.
- Total points: The team with the most total points will receive the higher seed
- Random drawing: The higher seed shall be determined by a "coin flip".

=== Teams ===
- Atlanta Hawks
- Boston Celtics
- Brooklyn Nets
- Charlotte Hornets
- Chicago Bulls
- Cleveland Cavaliers
- Dallas Mavericks
- Detroit Pistons
- Denver Nuggets
- Golden State Warriors
- Houston Rockets
- Indiana Pacers
- Los Angeles Clippers
- Los Angeles Lakers
- Memphis Grizzlies
- Miami Heat
- Milwaukee Bucks
- Minnesota Timberwolves
- New Orleans Pelicans
- New York Knicks
- Oklahoma City Thunder
- Orlando Magic
- Philadelphia 76ers
- Phoenix Suns
- Portland Trail Blazers
- Sacramento Kings
- San Antonio Spurs
- Toronto Raptors
- Utah Jazz
- Washington Wizards

=== Games ===
==== Day 1 ====
NBA TV

July 12
4:00 PM EDT/1:00 PM PDT

Boxscore

Cleveland Cavaliers 79, Orlando Magic 106
Scoring by quarter: 21–36, 20–26, 16–25, 22–19
Pts: Emoni Bates (20); Rebs: Jaylon Tyson (8); Asts: Darius Brown II (6)	Pts: Jett Howard (22); Rebs: Huff & Moon (6); Asts: da Silva & Howard (4)

Cox Pavilion, Las Vegas, Nevada
Referees: Evan Scott, Brandon Schwab, Jenna Reneau

ESPN2

July 12
5:00 PM EDT/2:00 PM PDT

Boxscore

New Orleans Pelicans 74, Minnesota Timberwolves 81
Scoring by quarter: 23–24, 17–21, 16–17, 18–19
Pts: Jordan Hawkins (18); Rebs: Jordan Hall (9); Asts: Hawkins & Ford (3)	Pts: Terrence Shannon Jr. (25); Rebs: Josh Minott (8); Asts: Nix, Dillingham, Hifi (5)

Thomas & Mack Center, Las Vegas, Nevada
Referees: Brandon Adair, Dannica Mosher, Matt Kallio

NBA TV

July 12
6:00 PM EDT/3:00 PM PDT

Boxscore

Sacramento Kings 83, Memphis Grizzlies 103
Scoring by quarter: 19–28, 16–27, 22–24, 26–24
Pts: Mason Jones (16); Rebs: Jones & Lual-Acuil (11); Asts: Keon Ellis (6)	Pts: Jake LaRavia (22); Rebs: Trey Jemison (8); Asts: Spencer & Pippen Jr. (4)

Cox Pavilion, Las Vegas, Nevada
Referees: Jonathan Sterling, Danielle Scott, Scott Wall

ESPN

July 12
7:30 PM EDT/4:30 PM PDT

Boxscore

Houston Rockets 99, Los Angeles Lakers 80
Scoring by quarter: 26–26, 28–19, 26–16, 19–19
Pts: Reed Sheppard (23); Rebs: Whitmore (10); Asts: Reed Sheppard (5)	Pts: Dalton Knecht (25); Rebs: Colin Castleton (10); Asts: Trent Forrest (6)

Thomas & Mack Center, Las Vegas, Nevada
Referees: Matt Myers, Nate Green, Suyash Mehta

NBA TV

July 12
8:00 PM EDT/5:00 PM PDT

Boxscore

Brooklyn Nets 97, Indiana Pacers 95 (OT)
Scoring by quarter: 17–21, 16–20, 27–20, 29–28, Overtime: 8–6
Pts: Jalen Wilson (25); Rebs: Jaylen Martin (8); Asts: Jacob Gilyard (7)	Pts: Jarace Walker (25); Rebs: Oscar Tshiebwe (19); Asts: Quenton Jackson (5)

Cox Pavilion, Las Vegas, Nevada
Referees: Agon Abazi, Blanca Burns, Omar Bermudez

ESPN

July 12
9:30 PM EDT/6:30 PM PDT

Boxscore

Atlanta Hawks 88, Washington Wizards 94
Scoring by quarter: 23–14, 19–26, 23–26, 23–28
Pts: Zaccharie Risacher (18); Rebs: Dylan Windler (8); Asts: Keaton Wallace (6)	Pts: Bub Carrington (19); Rebs: Bub Carrington (9); Asts: Bub Carrington (8)

Thomas & Mack Center, Las Vegas, Nevada
Referees: Andy Nagy, Simone Jelks, Robert Hussey

NBA TV

July 12
10:00 PM EDT/7:00 PM PDT

Boxscore

Denver Nuggets 78, Los Angeles Clippers 88
Scoring by quarter: 16–17, 22–24, 19–19, 21–28
Pts: Julian Strawther (25); Rebs: DaRon Holmes II (7); Asts: Jalen Pickett (4)	Pts: Jordan Miller (36); Rebs: Moussa Diabaté (10); Asts: RayJ Dennis (8)

Cox Pavilion, Las Vegas, Nevada
Referees: Angel Kent, Maripier Malo, Alberto Baena

==== Day 2 ====
NBA TV

July 13
4:30 PM EDT/1:30 PM PDT

Boxscore

Milwaukee Bucks 89, Chicago Bulls 96
Scoring by quarter: 27–26, 19–24, 20–30, 23–16
Pts: MarJon Beauchamp (22); Rebs: Ibou Badji (9); Asts: MarJon Beauchamp (5)	Pts: Phillips, Sanogo, Smart (17); Rebs: Adama Sanogo (12); Asts: DJ Steward (6)

Cox Pavilion, Las Vegas, Nevada
Referees: Nate Cearley, Ajay Gonnelli, Kristian Paez

ESPN2

July 13
5:00 PM EDT/2:00 PM PDT

Boxscore

Charlotte Hornets 94, New York Knicks 90
Scoring by quarter: 23–12, 24–28, 20–23, 27–27
Pts: Nick Smith Jr. (24); Rebs: Brandon Miller (8); Asts: Zavier Simpson (10)	Pts: Duane Washington Jr. (26); Rebs: Kolek & Skapintsev (7); Asts: Tyler Kolek (7)

Thomas & Mack Center, Las Vegas, Nevada
Referees: Clare Aubry, Jafar Kinsey, Deldre Carr

NBA TV

July 13
6:30 PM EDT/3:30 PM PDT

Boxscore

Miami Heat 119, Boston Celtics 114
Scoring by quarter: 28–32, 33–21, 28–29, 30–32
Pts: Jaime Jaquez Jr. (29); Rebs: Jaime Jaquez Jr. (11); Asts: Isaiah Stevens (11)	Pts: Jaden Springer (23); Rebs: Neemias Queta (9); Asts: JD Davison (7)

Cox Pavilion, Las Vegas, Nevada
Referees: CP Painter, Gina Catanzariti, Shante Anderson

ESPN2

July 13
7:00 PM EDT/4:00 PM PDT

Boxscore

Detroit Pistons 81, Philadelphia 76ers 94
Scoring by quarter: 16–18, 21–23, 26–23, 18–30
Pts: Ron Holland (15); Rebs: Tolu Smith (11); Asts: Jenkins & Klintman (5)	Pts: Ricky Council IV (24); Rebs: Keve Aluma (8); Asts: Jeff Dowtin (8)

Thomas & Mack Center, Las Vegas, Nevada
Referees: Brent Haskill, Hortencia Sanchez-Carrizales, Ariadna Chueca

NBA TV

July 13
8:30 PM EDT/5:30 PM PDT

Boxscore

Oklahoma City Thunder 69, Toronto Raptors 94
Scoring by quarter: 10–30, 17–18, 23–14, 19–32
Pts: Adam Flagler (23); Rebs: Dillon Jones (7); Asts: Keyontae Johnson (4)	Pts: Gradey Dick (18); Rebs: Gradey Dick (10); Asts: Gradey Dick (16)

Cox Pavilion, Las Vegas, Nevada
Referees: Tyler Ricks, Cameron Gelinas, Yann Davidson

ESPN2

July 13
9:00 PM EDT/6:00 PM PDT

Boxscore

San Antonio Spurs 83, Portland Trail Blazers 77
Scoring by quarter: 28–18, 23–13, 22–24, 10–22
Pts: Stephon Castle (22); Rebs: Yauhen Massalski (14); Asts: Jamaree Bouyea (6)	Pts: Alex Reese (16); Rebs: Donovan Clingan (13); Asts: Rayan Rupert (5)

Thomas & Mack Center, Las Vegas, Nevada
Referees: JD Ralls, Gerda Gatling, Peter Praksch

NBA TV

July 13
10:30 PM EDT/7:30 PM PDT

Boxscore

Utah Jazz 90, Dallas Mavericks 89
Scoring by quarter: 19–18, 20–22, 25–30, 26–19
Pts: Cody Williams (21); Rebs: Taylor Hendricks (8); Asts: Isaiah Collier (7)	Pts: Brandon Williams (21); Rebs: Isaiah Whaley (9); Asts: Brandon Williams (5)

Cox Pavilion, Las Vegas, Nevada
Referees: Ken Jones, Cameron Garber, Kristaps Konstantinovs

ESPN2

July 13
11:00 PM EDT/8:00 PM PDT

Boxscore

Phoenix Suns 73, Golden State Warriors 90
Scoring by quarter: 19–32, 14–18, 22–24, 18–16
Pts: Michael Devoe (19); Rebs: David Roddy (7); Asts: Michael Devoe (4)	Pts: Daeqwon Plowden (19); Rebs: Jackson Rowe (9); Asts: Brandin Podziemski (6)

Thomas & Mack Center, Las Vegas, Nevada
Referees: Italo Araujo, Kastine Evans, Martin Vulic

==== Day 3 ====
NBA TV

July 14
3:30 PM EDT/12:30 PM PDT

Boxscore

Cleveland Cavaliers 112, Milwaukee Bucks 81
Scoring by quarter: 38–21, 34–16, 20–27, 20–17
Pts: Emoni Bates (18); Rebs: Travers & Tyson (7); Asts: Craig Porter Jr. (7)	Pts: MarJon Beauchamp (19); Rebs: MarJon Beauchamp (11); Asts: Ryan Rollins (5)

Cox Pavilion, Las Vegas, Nevada
Referees: Scott Wall, Omar Bermudez, Kaz Beverley

ESPN+

July 14
4:00 PM EDT/1:00 PM PDT

Boxscore

Brooklyn Nets 78, Los Angeles Clippers 87
Scoring by quarter: 18–31, 15–13, 8–18, 37–25
Pts: Keon Johnson (27); Rebs: Noah Clowney (7); Asts: Jacob Gilyard (7)	Pts: Jordan Miller (21); Rebs: Bannan & Brown (6); Asts: Jordan Miller (4)

Thomas & Mack Center, Las Vegas, Nevada
Referees: Tyler Mirkovich, JP Primm, Wojciech Liszka

NBA TV

July 14
5:30 PM EDT/2:30 PM PDT

Boxscore

Minnesota Timberwolves 105, Indiana Pacers 94
Scoring by quarter: 26–28, 25–16, 27–27, 27–23
Pts: Terrence Shannon Jr. (19); Rebs: Josh Minott (12); Asts: Rob Dillingham (8)	Pts: Johnny Furphy (18); Rebs: Oscar Tshiebwe (9); Asts: Tristen Newton (7)

Cox Pavilion, Las Vegas, Nevada
Referees: Julian McFadden, Kelsey Reynolds, Kristian Paez

ESPN2

July 14
6:00 PM EDT/3:00 PM PDT

Boxscore

Houston Rockets 109, Washington Wizards 91
Scoring by quarter: 29–23, 30–21, 22–28, 28–19
Pts: Cam Whitmore (25); Rebs: Orlando Robinson (15); Asts: Reed Sheppard (7)	Pts: Justin Champagnie (19); Rebs: Justin Champagnie (7); Asts: Bub Carrington (5)

Thomas & Mack Center, Las Vegas, Nevada
Referees: Klajdi Mulla, Maripier Malo, Ariadna Chueca

NBA TV

July 14
7:30 PM EDT/4:30 PM PDT

Boxscore

Orlando Magic 91, New Orleans Pelicans 86
Scoring by quarter: 21–21, 14–24, 25–22, 31–19
Pts: Tristan da Silva (23); Rebs: Jarrett Culver (7); Asts: Anthony Black (6)	Pts: Jordan Hawkins (24); Rebs: Izaiah Brockington (6); Asts: Karlo Matković (25)

Cox Pavilion, Las Vegas, Nevada
Referees: Blanca Burns, Sarah Williams, Alberto Baena

ESPN2

July 14
8:00 PM EDT/5:00 PM PDT

Boxscore

San Antonio Spurs 79, Atlanta Hawks 76
Scoring by quarter: 21–17, 15–20, 20–18, 23–21
Pts: D'Moi Hodge (13); Rebs: Yauhen Massalski (11); Asts: Jamaree Bouyea (4)	Pts: E. J. Liddell (22); Rebs: Dylan Windler (12); Asts: Gueye, Joiner, Wallace, Windler (3)

Thomas & Mack Center, Las Vegas, Nevada
Referees: Pat O'Connell, Kenny Gardner, Peter Praksch

NBA TV

July 14
9:30 PM EDT/6:30 PM PDT

Boxscore

Denver Nuggets 81, Toronto Raptors 84
Scoring by quarter: 24–20, 19–17, 20–28, 18–19
Pts: Julian Strawther (32); Rebs: PJ Hall & Tyson (6); Asts: Trey Alexander & Strawther (5)	Pts: Javon Freeman-Liberty (16); Rebs: Branden Carlson (7); Asts: Jamal Shead (5)

Cox Pavilion, Las Vegas, Nevada
Referees: Marcy Williams, Matt Rafferty, Kristaps Konstantinovs

ESPN2

July 14
10:00 PM EDT/7:00 PM PDT

Boxscore

Chicago Bulls 82, Golden State Warriors 92
Scoring by quarter: 23–24, 17–19, 19–27, 23–22
Pts: Matas Buzelis (28); Rebs: Adama Sanogo (8); Asts: DJ Steward (9)	Pts: Brandin Podziemski (21); Rebs: Brandin Podziemski (12); Asts: Brandin Podziemski (7)

Thomas & Mack Center, Las Vegas, Nevada
Referees: Julian Scott, Leah Lanie, Martin Vulic

==== Day 4 ====
ESPNU

July 15
6:00 PM EDT/3:00 PM PDT

Boxscore

Oklahoma City Thunder 73, Miami Heat 102
Scoring by quarter: 20–18, 13–23, 24–32, 16–29
Pts: Ajay Mitchell (21); Rebs: KJ Williams (9); Asts: Ajay Mitchell (5)	Pts: Christopher & Jaquez Jr. (23); Rebs: Kel'el Ware (12); Asts: Isaiah Stevens (7)

Cox Pavilion, Las Vegas, Nevada
Referees: Derrick Collins, Suyash Mehta, Danielle Scott

NBA TV

July 15
6:30 PM EDT/3:30 PM PDT

Boxscore

Detroit Pistons 87, Houston Rockets 73
Scoring by quarter: 13–16, 24–20, 26–28, 24–9
Pts: Daniss Jenkins (26); Rebs: Bobi Klintman (9); Asts: Marcus Sasser (8)	Pts: AJ Griffin (18); Rebs: Nate Williams (10); Asts: Cam Whitmore (5)

Thomas & Mack Center, Las Vegas, Nevada
Referees: Brandon Adair, Matt Myers, Evan Scott

ESPNU

July 15
8:00 PM EDT/5:00 PM PDT

Boxscore

Dallas Mavericks 88, Memphis Grizzlies 108
Scoring by quarter: 11–30, 23–23, 22–34, 32–21
Pts: Olivier-Maxence Prosper (16); Rebs: Alex Fudge (7); Asts: Prosper & Williams (4)	Pts: GG Jackson (23); Rebs: GG Jackson (11); Asts: LaRavia & Pippen Jr. (7)

Cox Pavilion, Las Vegas, Nevada
Referees: Andy Nagy, Brandon Schwab, Kevin Fahy

NBA TV

July 15
8:30 PM EDT/5:30 PM PDT

Boxscore

Portland Trail Blazers 97, Philadelphia 76ers 95
Scoring by quarter: 24–25, 27–23, 26–29, 20–18
Pts: Bryce McGowens (20); Rebs: Donovan Clingan (11); Asts: Kendric Davis (8)	Pts: Ricky Council IV (18); Rebs: Keve Aluma (9); Asts: Jeff Dowtin (8)

Thomas & Mack Center, Las Vegas, Nevada
Referees: Jonathan Sterling, Matt Kalio, Simone Jelks

ESPNU

July 15
10:00 PM EDT/7:00 PM PDT

Boxscore

Utah Jazz 70, Sacramento Kings 82
Scoring by quarter: 9–23, 16–25, 24–17, 21–17
Pts: Cody Williams (14); Rebs: Bacot & Collier (6); Asts: Isaiah Collier (3)	Pts: Colby Jones (25); Rebs: Isaac Jones (7); Asts: Mason Jones (9)

Cox Pavilion, Las Vegas, Nevada
Referees: Jenna Reneau, Jacob Barnett, Yann Davidson

NBA TV

July 15
10:30 PM EDT/7:30 PM PDT

Boxscore

Boston Celtics 88, Los Angeles Lakers 74
Scoring by quarter: 19–17, 31–17, 15–15, 23–25
Pts: Neemias Queta (22); Rebs: Neemias Queta (8); Asts: JD Davison (7)	Pts: Dalton Knecht (19); Rebs: Colin Castleton (8); Asts: Sean East II (5)

Thomas & Mack Center, Las Vegas, Nevada
Referees: Nate Green, Robert Hussey, Dannica Mosher

==== Day 5 ====
ESPNU

July 16
4:00 PM EDT/1:00 PM PDT

Boxscore

Indiana Pacers 98, Phoenix Suns 94
Scoring by quarter: 24–26, 20–28, 29–18, 25–22
Pts: Jarace Walker (19); Rebs: Enrique Freeman (9); Asts: Jackson & Newton (6)	Pts: Quinndary Weatherspoon (17); Rebs: David Roddy (12); Asts: Michael Devoe (5)

Cox Pavilion, Las Vegas, Nevada
Referees: Kelsey Reynolds, Cameron Gelinas, Shante Anderson

NBA TV

July 16
4:30 PM EDT/1:30 PM PDT

Boxscore

New York Knicks 85, Brooklyn Nets 92
Scoring by quarter: 28–11, 15–28, 19–18, 23–35
Pts: Duane Washington Jr. (21); Rebs: Dmytro Skapintsev (9); Asts: Tyler Kolek (7)	Pts: Jalen Wilson (27); Rebs: Zylan Cheatham (8); Asts: Keon Johnson (5)

Thomas & Mack Center, Las Vegas, Nevada
Referees: Tyler Mirkovich, Josh Reed, Kristian Paez

ESPN2

July 16
6:00 PM EDT/3:00 PM PDT

Boxscore

Charlotte Hornets 80, Denver Nuggets 66
Scoring by quarter: 22–15, 17–21, 20–15, 21–15
Pts: Nick Smith Jr. (21); Rebs: Tidjane Salaün (10); Asts: Zavier Simpson (8)	Pts: Hunter Tyson (20); Rebs: Alexander & Toney (8); Asts: Pickett & Young (3)

Cox Pavilion, Las Vegas, Nevada
Referees: Biniam Maru, Kenny Gardner, Alberto Baena

NBA TV

July 16
6:30 PM EDT/3:30 PM PDT

Boxscore

Chicago Bulls 77, Detroit Pistons 85
Scoring by quarter: 31–17, 13–21, 20–24, 13–23
Pts: Matas Buzelis (18); Rebs: Julian Phillips (7); Asts: DJ Steward (6)	Pts: Jayce Johnson (19); Rebs: Bobi Klintman (12); Asts: Javante McCoy (5)

Thomas & Mack Center, Las Vegas, Nevada
Referees: Klajdi Mulla, Ken Jones, Cameron Garber

ESPN2

July 16
8:00 PM EDT/5:00 PM PDT

Boxscore

Philadelphia 76ers 92, Minnesota Timberwolves 90
Scoring by quarter: 25–22, 23–24, 28–14, 16–30
Pts: Jared McCain (21); Rebs: Adem Bona (9); Asts: Dowtin & Edwards (3)	Pts: Miller & Nix (22); Rebs: Leonard Miller (13); Asts: Rob Dillingham (7)

Cox Pavilion, Las Vegas, Nevada
Referees: Julian Scott, Bobby Bissant, Kristaps Konstantinovs

NBA TV

July 16
8:30 PM EDT/5:30 PM PDT

Boxscore

Washington Wizards 80, Portland Trail Blazers 82
Scoring by quarter: 18–17, 20–22, 22–27, 20–16
Pts: Bub Carrington (20); Rebs: Champagnie & Sarr (9); Asts: Carrington & Nowell (5)	Pts: Bryce McGowens (19); Rebs: Donovan Clingan (13); Asts: Kris Murray (4)

Thomas & Mack Center, Las Vegas, Nevada
Referees: CP Painter, Jason Alabanza, Peter Praksch

ESPN2

July 16
10:00 PM EDT/7:00 PM PDT

Boxscore

Los Angeles Clippers 112, Milwaukee Bucks 97
Scoring by quarter: 28–22, 30–23, 30–31, 24–21
Pts: Jordan Miller (23); Rebs: Kobe Brown (9); Asts: Kobe Brown (6)	Pts: Ryan Rollins (24); Rebs: Chris Livingston (12); Asts: MarJon Beauchamp (6)

Cox Pavilion, Las Vegas, Nevada
Referees: Catherine Chang, Julian McFadden, Wojciech Liszka

NBA TV

July 16
10:30 PM EDT/7:30 PM PDT

Boxscore

New Orleans Pelicans 85, San Antonio Spurs 90
Scoring by quarter: 21–21, 20–24, 19–22, 25–23
Pts: Karlo Matković (25); Rebs: Karlo Matković (5); Asts: Jordan Hall (5)	Pts: Riley Minix (16); Rebs: Yauhen Massalski (10); Asts: Donovan Williams (5)

Thomas & Mack Center, Las Vegas, Nevada
Referees: Teresa Stuck, JP Primm, Ariadna Chueca

==== Day 6 ====
ESPN2

July 17
3:00 PM EDT/12:00 PM PDT

Boxscore

Miami Heat 92, Dallas Mavericks 79
Scoring by quarter: 14–21, 23–11, 24–25, 31–22
Pts: Kel'el Ware (24); Rebs: Kel'el Ware (10); Asts: Isaiah Stevens (8)	Pts: A. J. Lawson (22); Rebs: Emanuel Miller (8); Asts: Gortman, Miller, Prosper (3)

Thomas & Mack Center, Las Vegas, Nevada
Referees: Brent Haskill, Omar Bermudez, Martin Vulic

NBA TV

July 17
3:30 PM EDT/12:30 PM PDT

Boxscore

Sacramento Kings 105, New York Knicks 106
Scoring by quarter: 30–23, 23–30, 22–25, 30–28
Pts: Keon Ellis (29); Rebs: Isaac Jones (8); Asts: Mason Jones (7)	Pts: Tyler Kolek (21); Rebs: Ariel Hukporti (10); Asts: Tyler Kolek (8)

Cox Pavilion, Las Vegas, Nevada
Referees: Paul Tuomey, Hortencia Sanchez-Carrizales, Jacob Barnett

ESPN2

July 17
5:00 PM EDT/2:00 PM PDT

Boxscore

Toronto Raptors 76, Utah Jazz 86
Scoring by quarter: 21–19, 10–23, 20–26, 25–18
Pts: Javon Freeman-Liberty (24); Rebs: Ulrich Chomche (7); Asts: Ochai Agbaji (4)	Pts: Taylor Hendricks (23); Rebs: Taylor Hendricks (9); Asts: Isaiah Collier (5)

Thomas & Mack Center, Las Vegas, Nevada
Referees: Pat O'Connell, Maripier Malo, Yann Davidson

NBA TV

July 17
5:30 PM EDT/2:30 PM PDT

Boxscore

Boston Celtics 89, Charlotte Hornets 84
Scoring by quarter: 19–19, 14–20, 23–21, 33–24
Pts: Ramsey & Watson (15); Rebs: Baylor Scheierman (6); Asts: Jahmi'us Ramsey (5)	Pts: Zavier Simpson (19); Rebs: James Banks III (7); Asts: Zavier Simpson (6)

Cox Pavilion, Las Vegas, Nevada
Referees: Nate Cearley, Matt Rafferty, Ajay Gonnelli

ESPN+

July 17
7:00 PM EDT/4:00 PM PDT

Boxscore

Memphis Grizzlies 104, Orlando Magic 98
Scoring by quarter: 33–24, 24–16, 18–34, 29–24
Pts: GG Jackson (27); Rebs: GG Jackson (13); Asts: Scotty Pippen Jr. (9)	Pts: Jett Howard (21); Rebs: Culver & Silva (6); Asts: Xavier Moon (8)

Thomas & Mack Center, Las Vegas, Nevada
Referees: JD Ralls, Gina Catanzariti, Kaz Beverley

NBA TV

July 17
8:00 PM EDT/5:00 PM PDT

Boxscore

Phoenix Suns 100, Oklahoma City Thunder 99
Scoring by quarter: 22–28, 25–27, 24–23, 29–21
Pts: David Roddy (21); Rebs: Oso Ighodaro (8); Asts: David Roddy (5)	Pts: Buddy Boeheim (20); Rebs: Keyontae Johnson (7); Asts: Hunter Maldonado (10)

Cox Pavilion, Las Vegas, Nevada
Referees: Derrick Collins, Ryan Johnson, Rachael Rayford

ESPN

July 17
9:30 PM EDT/6:30 PM PDT

Boxscore

Los Angeles Lakers 87, Atlanta Hawks 86
Scoring by quarter: 21–20, 23–21, 19–31, 24–14
Pts: Colin Castleton (17); Rebs: Colin Castleton (12); Asts: Castleton & East II (6)	Pts: Baker & Joiner (17); Rebs: Miles Norris (8); Asts: Keaton Wallace (5)

Thomas & Mack Center, Las Vegas, Nevada
Referees: Italo Araujo, Erik Aellig, Stacie Blow

NBA TV

July 17
10:00 PM EDT/7:00 PM PDT

Boxscore

Golden State Warriors 96, Cleveland Cavaliers 85
Scoring by quarter: 26–22, 28–16, 21–20, 21–27
Pts: Daeqwon Plowden (16); Rebs: Roman Sorkin (10); Asts: Collins & Spencer (7)	Pts: Craig Porter Jr. (14); Rebs: Pete Nance (8); Asts: Jaylon Tyson (4)

Cox Pavilion, Las Vegas, Nevada
Referees: Angel Kent, Jafar Kinsey, Kastine Evans

==== Day 7 ====
ESPN2

July 18
4:30 PM EDT/1:30 PM PDT

Boxscore

Indiana Pacers 71, Denver Nuggets 86
Scoring by quarter: 13–18, 13–24, 26–17, 19–27
Pts: Tristen Newton (15); Rebs: Jarace Walker (11); Asts: Jarace Walker (6)	Pts: Hunter Tyson (23); Rebs: PJ Hall (13); Asts: PJ Hall (3)

Thomas & Mack Center, Las Vegas, Nevada
Referees: Jenna Schroeder, Kevin Fahy, Charles Watson

NBA TV

July 18
6:00 PM EDT/3:00 PM PDT

Boxscore

Memphis Grizzlies 88, New Orleans Pelicans 77
Scoring by quarter: 25–25, 18–18, 23–16, 22–18
Pts: Jackson & Pippen Jr. (17); Rebs: GG Jackson (7); Asts: Scotty Pippen Jr. (11)	Pts: Jordan Ford (16); Rebs: Yves Missi (6); Asts: Jordan Ford (4)

Cox Pavilion, Las Vegas, Nevada
Referees: Blanca Burns, Julian McFadden, William McClatchy

ESPN

July 18
7:00 PM EDT/4:00 PM PDT

Boxscore

Washington Wizards 73, Sacramento Kings 69
Scoring by quarter: 17–19, 26–16, 14–20, 16–14
Pts: Jules Bernard (20); Rebs: Alex Sarr (11); Asts: Patrick Baldwin Jr. (5)	Pts: Boogie Ellis (15); Rebs: Isaac Jones (10); Asts: Mason Jones (8)

Thomas & Mack Center, Las Vegas, Nevada
Referees: Tyler Ricks, Catherine Chang, Josh Reed

NBA TV

July 18
8:00 PM EDT/5:00 PM PDT

Boxscore

Orlando Magic 100, Brooklyn Nets 102 (OT)
Scoring by quarter: 23–18, 18–31, 31–26, 23–20, Overtime: 5–7
Pts: Huff & Maledon (20); Rebs: Gardner & Rhoden (7); Asts: Théo Maledon (6)	Pts: Jalen Wilson (33); Rebs: Jalen Wilson (10); Asts: Keon Johnson (10)

Cox Pavilion, Las Vegas, Nevada
Referees: Biniam Maru, Jason Alabanza, Lars Murray

ESPN

July 18
9:00 PM EDT/6:00 PM PDT

Boxscore

Los Angeles Lakers 93, Cleveland Cavaliers 89
Scoring by quarter: 24–20, 22–30, 22–22, 25–17
Pts: Dalton Knecht (20); Rebs: Dalton Knecht (7); Asts: Colin Castleton (7)	Pts: Jaylon Tyson (21); Rebs: Jaylon Tyson (11); Asts: Jaylon Tyson (9)

Thomas & Mack Center, Las Vegas, Nevada
Referees: Agon Abazi, Clare Aubry, Ashley Birch

NBA TV

July 18
10:00 PM EDT/7:00 PM PDT

Boxscore

Los Angeles Clippers 105, Utah Jazz 88
Scoring by quarter: 13–19, 30–21, 27–24, 35–24
Pts: Kobe Brown (22); Rebs: Moussa Diabaté (9); Asts: Kobe Brown (6)	Pts: Isaiah Collier (20); Rebs: Bacot & Kinsey (6); Asts: Collier & Williams (3)

Cox Pavilion, Las Vegas, Nevada
Referees: Jenna Reneau, Gerda Gatling, Geness Perrymond

ESPN

July 18
11:00 PM EDT/8:00 PM PDT

Boxscore

Minnesota Timberwolves 93, Houston Rockets 83
Scoring by quarter: 29–16, 17–23, 18–22, 29–22
Pts: Leonard Miller (21); Rebs: Leonard Miller (11); Asts: Daishen Nix (7)	Pts: Reed Sheppard (20); Rebs: Orlando Robinson (9); Asts: Reed Sheppard (7)

Thomas & Mack Center, Las Vegas, Nevada
Referees: Isaac Barnett, Marcy Williams, Ryo Hasbe

==== Day 8 ====
NBA TV

July 19
4:00 PM EDT/1:00 PM PDT

Boxscore

Milwaukee Bucks 90, Phoenix Suns 115
Scoring by quarter: 11–31, 22–25, 29–30, 28–29
Pts: Chris Livingston (20); Rebs: Beauchamp & Livingston (8); Asts: Besson & Johnson (4)	Pts: Isaiah Wong (19); Rebs: Oso Ighodaro (11); Asts: Ighodaro & Walker (5)

Thomas & Mack Center, Las Vegas, Nevada
Referees: Teresa Stuck, JP Primm, Stacie Blow

ESPNU

July 19
4:30 PM EDT/1:30 PM PDT

Boxscore

Dallas Mavericks 101, Boston Celtics 90
Scoring by quarter: 30–22, 25–23, 21–24, 25–21
Pts: Olivier-Maxence Prosper (22); Rebs: Gortman & Miller (7); Asts: Jazian Gortman (5)	Pts: Jaelen House (18); Rebs: Jordan Walsh (11); Asts: Jaelen House (9)

Cox Pavilion, Las Vegas, Nevada
Referees: Tyler Mirkovich, Bobby Bissant, Kastine Evans

NBA TV

July 19
6:00 PM EDT/3:00 PM PDT

Boxscore

Atlanta Hawks 99, Chicago Bulls 103 (OT)
Scoring by quarter: 17–24, 25–34, 26–18, 28–20, Overtime: 3–7
Pts: Keaton Wallace (22); Rebs: Dylan Windler (7); Asts: Jarkel Joiner (8)	Pts: DJ Steward (37); Rebs: Adama Sanogo (9); Asts: DJ Steward (7)

Thomas & Mack Center, Las Vegas, Nevada
Referees: Cameron Gelinas, Rachael Rayford, Gina Catanzariti

ESPN

July 19
7:00 PM EDT/4:00 PM PDT

Boxscore

New York Knicks 91, Detroit Pistons 90
Scoring by quarter: 28–27, 27–18, 21–18, 15–27
Pts: Dmytro Skapintsev (17); Rebs: Dmytro Skapintsev (10); Asts: Tyler Kolek (7)	Pts: Marcus Sasser (24); Rebs: Tolu Smith (14); Asts: Klintman & Sasser (5)

Cox Pavilion, Las Vegas, Nevada
Referees: Klajdi Mulla, Ken Jones, Kenny Gardner

NBA TV

July 19
8:30 PM EDT/5:30 PM PDT

Boxscore

Philadelphia 76ers 96, San Antonio Spurs 80
Scoring by quarter: 25–12, 17–25, 22–26, 32–17
Pts: Ricky Council IV (20); Rebs: Keve Aluma (9); Asts: Jeff Dowtin (5)	Pts: Jamaree Bouyea (15); Rebs: Harrison Ingram (9); Asts: Cissoko & Ingram (3)

Thomas & Mack Center, Las Vegas, Nevada
Referees: Charles Watson, Sarah Williams, Austin Spiker

ESPN+

July 19
9:00 PM EDT/6:00 PM PDT

Boxscore

Toronto Raptors 73, Miami Heat 109
Scoring by quarter: 7–32, 17–29, 25–26, 24–22
Pts: Ja'Kobe Walter (16); Rebs: Quincy Guerrier (7); Asts: D. J. Carton (3)	Pts: Cole Swider (21); Rebs: Kel'el Ware (10); Asts: Isaiah Stevens (8)

Cox Pavilion, Las Vegas, Nevada
Referees: CP Painter, Jafar Kinsey, Leah Lanie

NBA TV

July 19
10:30 PM EDT/7:30 PM PDT

Boxscore

Golden State Warriors 90, Oklahoma City Thunder 83
Scoring by quarter: 22–18, 18–19, 23–20, 27–26
Pts: Pat Spencer (17); Rebs: Kevin Knox II (10); Asts: Pat Spencer (7)	Pts: Hunter Maldonado (25); Rebs: KJ Williams (7); Asts: Keyontae Johnson (6)

Thomas & Mack Center, Las Vegas, Nevada
Referees: Kelsey Reynolds, Paul Tuomey, Ryan Johnson

ESPN2

July 19
11:00 PM EDT/8:00 PM PDT

Boxscore

Portland Trail Blazers 68, Charlotte Hornets 84
Scoring by quarter: 13–20, 16–16, 8–25, 31–23
Pts: Clingan & McGowens (16); Rebs: Donovan Clingan (12); Asts: Rayan Rupert (6)	Pts: Matt Morgan (36); Rebs: McConnell & Stephens (7); Asts: Zavier Simpson (8)

Cox Pavilion, Las Vegas, Nevada
Referees: Italo Araujo, Erik Aellig, Quincy Smith

==== Day 9 ====
NBA TV

July 20
3:00 PM EDT/12:00 PM PDT

Boxscore

Phoenix Suns 77, Sacramento Kings 87
Scoring by quarter: 20–21, 20–17, 19–23, 18–26
Pts: Jalen Bridges (16); Rebs: Ighodaro, Johnson, Osborne (5); Asts: Oso Ighodaro (9)	Pts: Boogie Ellis (17); Rebs: Drew Timme (7); Asts: Ahmad Caver (5)

Thomas & Mack Center, Las Vegas, Nevada
Referees: Agon Abazi, Erik Aellig, Josh Reed

ESPN

July 20
4:00 PM EDT/1:00 PM PDT

Boxscore

Milwaukee Bucks 79, Washington Wizards 91
Scoring by quarter: 19–29, 16–17, 31–15, 13–30
Pts: Livingston & Washington Jr. (13); Rebs: Tyler Smith (11); Asts: Hugo Besson (4)	Pts: Taylor Funk (29); Rebs: Bub Carrington (15); Asts: Butler Jr., Carrington, Funk (5)

Cox Pavilion, Las Vegas, Nevada
Referees: Julian McFadden, Jason Alabanza, Geness Perrymond

NBA TV

July 20
5:00 PM EDT/2:00 PM PDT

Boxscore

Indiana Pacers 93, Cleveland Cavaliers 100
Scoring by quarter: 18–22, 20–16, 27–28, 28–34
Pts: Quenton Jackson (22); Rebs: James, Newton, Tshiebwe (6); Asts: Tristen Newton (4)	Pts: Jaylon Tyson (23); Rebs: Pete Nance (8); Asts: Darius Brown II (5)

Thomas & Mack Center, Las Vegas, Nevada
Referees: Clare Aubry, Hortencia Sanchez-Carrizales, Ashley Birch

ESPN

July 20
6:00 PM EDT/3:00 PM PDT

Boxscore

New York Knicks 90, Atlanta Hawks 82
Scoring by quarter: 18–21, 25–17, 24–22, 23–22
Pts: Obadiah Noel (15); Rebs: Hukporti & Johnson (7); Asts: Tyler Kolek (6)	Pts: Keaton Wallace (23); Rebs: Miles Norris (9); Asts: Keaton Wallace (9)

Cox Pavilion, Las Vegas, Nevada
Referees: Cameron Garber, Ajay Gonnelli, Kaz Beverley

NBA TV

July 20
7:00 PM EDT/4:00 PM PDT

Boxscore

Chicago Bulls 81, Los Angeles Lakers 107
Scoring by quarter: 18–39, 18–17, 22–16, 23–35
Pts: Dereon Seabron (18); Rebs: Garrison Brooks (8); Asts: Dereon Seabron (5)	Pts: Blake Hinson (25); Rebs: Grayson Murphy (11); Asts: Grayson Murphy (10)

Thomas & Mack Center, Las Vegas, Nevada
Referees: Isaac Barnett, Julian Scott, Ryo Hasbe

NBA TV

July 20
9:00 PM EDT/6:00 PM PDT

Boxscore

New Orleans Pelicans 82, Denver Nuggets 91
Scoring by quarter: 8–29, 26–13, 19–26, 29–23
Pts: Keion Brooks Jr. (24); Rebs: Trhae Mitchell (8); Asts: Jordan Ford (6)	Pts: Jahmir Young (21); Rebs: Trey Alexander (7); Asts: Jahmir Young (5)

Thomas & Mack Center, Las Vegas, Nevada
Referees: Gerda Gatling, Matt Rafferty, William McClatchy

NBA TV

July 20
11:00 PM EDT/8:00 PM PDT

Boxscore

Oklahoma City Thunder 88, Dallas Mavericks 79
Scoring by quarter: 16–20, 22–22, 25–12, 25–25
Pts: Johnson & Shackelford (20); Rebs: Kylor Kelley (12); Asts: Johnson & Shackelford (6)	Pts: A. J. Lawson (19); Rebs: Jamarion Sharp (10); Asts: Jazian Gortman (9)

Thomas & Mack Center, Las Vegas, Nevada
Referees: Jenna Schroeder, Biniam Maru, Lars Murray

==== Day 10 ====
ESPN

July 21
2:00 PM EDT/11:00 AM PDT

Boxscore

Los Angeles Clippers 98, Memphis Grizzlies 99
Scoring by quarter: 19–25, 35–24, 13–24, 31–26
Pts: Jordan Miller (28); Rebs: Moussa Diabaté (6); Asts: Brown, Dennis, Miller (4)	Pts: Jaylen Wells (28); Rebs: Scotty Pippen Jr. (10); Asts: Scotty Pippen Jr. (10)

Thomas & Mack Center, Las Vegas, Nevada
Referees: Isaac Barnett, Italo Araujo, Gina Catanzariti

NBA TV

July 21
3:00 PM EDT/12:00 PM PDT

Boxscore

Orlando Magic 100, Minnesota Timberwolves 115
Scoring by quarter: 20–36, 28–23, 26–21, 26–35
Pts: Charlie Brown Jr. (21); Rebs: Culver & Huff (7); Asts: Théo Maledon (8)	Pts: Rob Dillingham (25); Rebs: Leonard Miller (8); Asts: Rob Dillingham (12)

Cox Pavilion, Las Vegas, Nevada
Referees: CP Painter, Rachael Rayford, Shante Anderson

ESPN

July 21
4:00 PM EDT/1:00 PM PDT

Boxscore

Golden State Warriors 99, Miami Heat 102
Scoring by quarter: 19–22, 28–23, 23–20, 29–37
Pts: Kevin Knox II (31); Rebs: Kevin Knox II (11); Asts: Yuri Collins (8)	Pts: Josh Christopher (23); Rebs: Caleb Daniels (8); Asts: Isaiah Stevens (7)

Thomas & Mack Center, Las Vegas, Nevada
Referees: Brent Haskill, JD Ralls, Nate Cearley

NBA TV

July 21
5:00 PM EDT/2:00 PM PDT

Boxscore

Philadelphia 76ers 103, Boston Celtics 98
Scoring by quarter: 30–33, 19–19, 34–21, 20–25
Pts: David Jones (23); Rebs: David Jones (8); Asts: Judah Mintz (5)	Pts: Jordan Walsh (18); Rebs: Scheierman & Walsh (7); Asts: Jaelen House (6)

Cox Pavilion, Las Vegas, Nevada
Referees: Teresa Stuck, Ryan Johnson, Jacob Barnett

ESPNU

July 21
6:30 PM EDT/3:30 PM PDT

Boxscore

Charlotte Hornets 97, Brooklyn Nets 90
Scoring by quarter: 19–21, 31–27, 26–22, 21–20
Pts: Brandon Slater (30); Rebs: Jake Stephens (9); Asts: Jake Stephens (4)	Pts: Keon Johnson (15); Rebs: Jaylen Martin (7); Asts: Mark Armstrong (5)

Thomas & Mack Center, Las Vegas, Nevada
Referees: Catherine Chang, Bobby Bissant, Stacie Blow

NBA TV

July 21
7:00 PM EDT/4:00 PM PDT

Boxscore

Toronto Raptors 89, San Antonio Spurs 100
Scoring by quarter: 14–24, 19–26, 19–19, 37–31
Pts: Jamal Shead (18); Rebs: Ulrich Chomche (6); Asts: Jamal Shead (6)	Pts: Donovan Williams (16); Rebs: Yauhen Massalski (13); Asts: Yauhen Massalski (5)

Cox Pavilion, Las Vegas, Nevada
Referees: Paul Tuomey, Leah Lanie, Austin Spiker

ESPNU

July 21
8:30 PM EDT/5:30 PM PDT

Boxscore

Detroit Pistons 87, Utah Jazz 97
Scoring by quarter: 18–27, 21–40, 33–17, 15–13
Pts: Ron Holland (23); Rebs: Jalen Slawson (6); Asts: Marcus Sasser (6)	Pts: Kyle Filipowski (26); Rebs: Kyle Filipowski (11); Asts: Taevion Kinsey (7)

Thomas & Mack Center, Las Vegas, Nevada
Referees: Angel Kent, Kastine Evans, Jafar Kinsey

NBA TV

July 21
9:00 PM EDT/6:00 PM PDT

Boxscore

Houston Rockets 95, Portland Trail Blazers 105
Scoring by quarter: 27–20, 13–28, 27–33, 28–24
Pts: Trevor Keels (22); Rebs: Orlando Robinson (10); Asts: Keels & Samuels (4)	Pts: Kennedy Chandler (21); Rebs: Lee Hyun-jung & Murray (9); Asts: Lee Hyun-jung (4)

Cox Pavilion, Las Vegas, Nevada
Referees: Charles Watson, Sarah Williams, Quincy Smith

==== Day 11 ====
ESPN

July 22
8:00 PM EDT/5:00 PM PDT

Boxscore

Memphis Grizzlies 118, Miami Heat 120 (OT)
Scoring by quarter: 25–24, 32–30, 37–33, 19–26, Overtime: 5–7
Pts: Jake LaRavia (32); Rebs: GG Jackson (9); Asts: Scotty Pippen Jr. (11)	Pts: Josh Christopher (24); Rebs: Kel'el Ware (10); Asts: Daniels, Stevens, Williams (6)

Thomas & Mack Center, Las Vegas, Nevada
Referees: Tyler Ricks, Pat O'Connell, Marcy Williams
