= 2024–25 Philadelphia 76ers season =

- Head coach: Nick Nurse
- President: Daryl Morey
- General manager: Elton Brand
- Owner: Josh Harris
- Arena: Wells Fargo Center

Results
- Record: 24–58 (.293)
- Place: Division: 5th (Atlantic); Conference: 13th (Eastern)
- Playoff finish: Did not qualify
- Stats at Basketball Reference

Local media
- Television: NBCSPHI, NBCSPHI+, 6ABC
- Radio: WPEN

The 2024–25 Philadelphia 76ers season was the 76th season for the franchise in the National Basketball Association (NBA), as well as their first with Paul George on the roster.

A loss to the Brooklyn Nets on February 22, 2025 ensured the 76ers couldn't match or exceed their record from the previous season. Following a loss to the Atlanta Hawks on March 10, the 76ers were guaranteed to finish with a losing record for the first time since 2017. On March 13, general manager Daryl Morey revealed on Pablo Torre's podcast called "Pablo Torre Finds Out" that Morey and the 76ers did use AI to help make key team decisions and moves during the season. This led to derision by current and former NBA players (including a former 76ers player) regarding the team and Morey's situation there.

On March 29, the 76ers were eliminated from postseason contention for the first time since 2017 following a loss to the Miami Heat.

== Draft ==
Round	Pick	Player	Position(s)	Nationality	College / club
1	16	Jared McCain	PG	United States	Duke
2	41	Adem Bona	C	Nigeria; Turkey	UCLA

The 76ers entered this draft (which was two days long instead of one like it previously has been since the draft was shortened down to two rounds back in 1989) with a first-round pick and a second-round pick that originally belonged to the Chicago Bulls. They initially had another second-round pick of their own accord, but it was forfeited alongside their 2023 second-round pick due to tampering violations with respect to free agency. On the first night of the draft, the 76ers would select point guard Jared McCain from Duke University with their first round pick. Then, on the second day of the draft, the 76ers would select Nigerian-Turkish center Adem Bona from UCLA (and former professional basketball player from Turkey's Pınar Karşıyaka) with their sole second round pick.

== Roster ==
2024–25 Philadelphia 76ers roster
Players

Pos.	No.	Player	Height	Weight	DOB	From
F/C	30	Adem Bona	6 ft 10 in (2.08 m)	235 lb (107 kg)	2003-03-28	UCLA
G	12	Jared Butler	6 ft 3 in (1.91 m)	193 lb (88 kg)	2000-08-25	Baylor
G	14	Ricky Council IV	6 ft 6 in (1.98 m)	207 lb (94 kg)	2001-08-03	Arkansas
G	11	Jeff Dowtin (TW)	6 ft 3 in (1.91 m)	177 lb (80 kg)	1997-05-10	Rhode Island
C	1	Andre Drummond	6 ft 11 in (2.11 m)	279 lb (127 kg)	1993-08-10	Connecticut
G/F	19	Justin Edwards	6 ft 7 in (2.01 m)	203 lb (92 kg)	2003-12-16	Kentucky
F/C	21	Joel Embiid (injured)	7 ft 0 in (2.13 m)	280 lb (127 kg)	1994-03-16	Kansas
F	8	Paul George (injured)	6 ft 8 in (2.03 m)	220 lb (100 kg)	1990-05-02	Fresno State
G/F	23	Eric Gordon (injured)	6 ft 3 in (1.91 m)	215 lb (98 kg)	1988-12-25	Indiana
G	5	Quentin Grimes	6 ft 4 in (1.93 m)	210 lb (95 kg)	2000-05-08	Houston
G	17	Jalen Hood-Schifino (TW)	6 ft 5 in (1.96 m)	210 lb (95 kg)	2003-06-19	Indiana
G	7	Kyle Lowry (injured)	6 ft 0 in (1.83 m)	196 lb (89 kg)	1986-03-25	Villanova
G	0	Tyrese Maxey (injured)	6 ft 2 in (1.88 m)	200 lb (91 kg)	2000-10-04	Kentucky
G	20	Jared McCain (injured)	6 ft 3 in (1.91 m)	195 lb (88 kg)	2004-02-20	Duke
G/F	9	Kelly Oubre Jr.	6 ft 8 in (2.03 m)	203 lb (92 kg)	1995-12-09	Kansas
F	65	Alex Reese (TW)	6 ft 9 in (2.06 m)	245 lb (111 kg)	1999-05-21	Alabama
G	16	Lonnie Walker IV	6 ft 5 in (1.96 m)	204 lb (93 kg)	1998-12-14	Miami (FL)
F	28	Guerschon Yabusele	6 ft 8 in (2.03 m)	265 lb (120 kg)	1995-12-17	France

Coaches
Head coach
- Nick Nurse
Assistant(s)
- Matt Brase
- Fabulous Flournoy
- Bryan Gates
- Rico Hines
- Bobby Jackson
- Coby Karl
- Mike Longabardi
- Doug West

Legend
- (DP) Unsigned draft pick
- (FA) Free agent
- (S) Suspended
- (GL) On assignment to G League affiliate
- (TW) Two-way affiliate player
- Injured

Roster
Updated: February 4, 2025

== Standings ==
=== Division ===
Atlantic Division	W	L	PCT	GB	Home	Road	Div	GP
y – Boston Celtics	61	21	.744	–	28‍–‍13	33‍–‍8	14‍–‍2	82
x – New York Knicks	51	31	.622	10.0	27‍–‍14	24‍–‍17	12‍–‍4	82
Toronto Raptors	30	52	.366	31.0	18‍–‍23	12‍–‍29	8‍–‍8	82
Brooklyn Nets	26	56	.317	35.0	12‍–‍29	14‍–‍27	3‍–‍13	82
Philadelphia 76ers	24	58	.293	37.0	12‍–‍29	12‍–‍29	3‍–‍13	82

=== Conference ===
Eastern Conference
#	Team	W	L	PCT	GB	GP
1	c – Cleveland Cavaliers *	64	18	.780	–	82
2	y – Boston Celtics *	61	21	.744	3.0	82
3	x – New York Knicks	51	31	.622	13.0	82
4	x – Indiana Pacers	50	32	.610	14.0	82
5	x – Milwaukee Bucks	48	34	.585	16.0	82
6	x – Detroit Pistons	44	38	.537	20.0	82
7	y – Orlando Magic *	41	41	.500	23.0	82
8	pi – Atlanta Hawks	40	42	.488	24.0	82
9	pi – Chicago Bulls	39	43	.476	25.0	82
10	x – Miami Heat	37	45	.451	27.0	82
11	Toronto Raptors	30	52	.366	34.0	82
12	Brooklyn Nets	26	56	.317	38.0	82
13	Philadelphia 76ers	24	58	.293	40.0	82
14	Charlotte Hornets	19	63	.232	45.0	82
15	Washington Wizards	18	64	.220	46.0	82

== Game log ==
=== Preseason ===
2024 preseason game log
Total: 3–3 (Home: 2–0; Road: 1–3)
Preseason: 3–3 (home: 2–0; road: 1–3)

Game	Date	Team	Score	High points	High rebounds	High assists	Location Attendance	Record
1	October 7	New Zealand	W 139–84	Jackson, Maxey, McCain, Yabusele (15)	Drummond, McCain (7)	Jeff Dowtin (6)	Wells Fargo Center; 19,767	1–0
2	October 11	@ Minnesota	L 111–121	Paul George (23)	Andre Drummond (15)	Council IV, Jackson (3)	Wells Fargo Arena; 14,981	1–1
3	October 12	@ Boston	L 89–139	Jared McCain (20)	Ricky Council IV (5)	Dowtin, McCain, Mintz (3)	TD Garden; 19,156	1–2
4	October 14	@ Atlanta	W 104–89	Maxey, Oubre Jr. (14)	Drummond, Yabusele (11)	Tyrese Maxey (7)	State Farm Arena; 13,203	2–2
5	October 16	Brooklyn	W 117–95	Kelly Oubre Jr. (18)	Andre Drummond (9)	Tyrese Maxey (5)	Wells Fargo Center; 19,914	3–2
6	October 18	@ Orlando	L 99–114	Kelly Oubre Jr. (17)	Andre Drummond (20)	Dowtin, Jackson (3)	Kia Center; 18,846	3–3

2024–25 preseason schedule

=== Regular season ===
2024–25 game log
Total: 24–58 (Home: 12–29; Road: 12–29)
October: 1–3 (home: 0–2; road: 1–1)

Game	Date	Team	Score	High points	High rebounds	High assists	Location Attendance	Record
1	October 23	Milwaukee	L 109–124	Tyrese Maxey (25)	Andre Drummond (13)	Kyle Lowry (6)	Wells Fargo Center; 19,754	0–1
2	October 25	@ Toronto	L 107–115	Kelly Oubre Jr. (28)	Andre Drummond (9)	Martin, Maxey (4)	Scotiabank Arena; 18,345	0–2
3	October 27	@ Indiana	W 118–114 (OT)	Tyrese Maxey (45)	Andre Drummond (17)	Maxey, Yabusele (4)	Gainbridge Fieldhouse; 17,274	1–2
4	October 30	Detroit	L 95–105	Tyrese Maxey (32)	Andre Drummond (11)	Tyrese Maxey (7)	Wells Fargo Center; 19,759	1–3

November: 3–11 (home: 2–5; road: 1–6)

Game	Date	Team	Score	High points	High rebounds	High assists	Location Attendance	Record
5	November 2	Memphis	L 107–124	Tyrese Maxey (23)	Andre Drummond (9)	Tyrese Maxey (6)	Wells Fargo Center; 20,066	1–4
6	November 4	@ Phoenix	L 116–118	Tyrese Maxey (32)	Caleb Martin (10)	Kyle Lowry (7)	Footprint Center; 17,071	1–5
7	November 6	@ L.A. Clippers	L 98–110	George, Oubre Jr. (18)	Andre Drummond (10)	Kyle Lowry (4)	Intuit Dome; 15,627	1–6
8	November 8	@ L.A. Lakers	L 106–116	Jared McCain (18)	Andre Drummond (12)	Paul George (8)	Crypto.com Arena; 18,485	1–7
9	November 10	Charlotte	W 107–105 (OT)	Jared McCain (27)	Andre Drummond (10)	Paul George (9)	Wells Fargo Center; 19,764	2–7
10	November 12	New York	L 99–111	Paul George (29)	Paul George (10)	Joel Embiid (5)	Wells Fargo Center; 19,758	2–8
11	November 13	Cleveland	L 106–114	Jared McCain (34)	Bona, Yabusele (9)	Jared McCain (10)	Wells Fargo Center; 19,777	2–9
12	November 15	@ Orlando	L 86–98	Jared McCain (29)	Joel Embiid (8)	Paul George (5)	Kia Center; 17,843	2–10
13	November 18	@ Miami	L 89–106	Jared McCain (20)	Joel Embiid (8)	Dowtin, Embiid, George (5)	Kaseya Center; 19,608	2–11
14	November 20	@ Memphis	L 111–117	Joel Embiid (35)	Joel Embiid (11)	Jared McCain (5)	FedExForum; 15,533	2–12
15	November 22	Brooklyn	W 113–98	Jared McCain (30)	Guerschon Yabusele (11)	Tyrese Maxey (5)	Wells Fargo Center; 19,817	3–12
16	November 24	L.A. Clippers	L 99–125	Jared McCain (18)	Guerschon Yabusele (6)	Jackson, Maxey, McCain (4)	Wells Fargo Center; 19,780	3–13
17	November 27	Houston	L 115–122 (OT)	Tyrese Maxey (39)	Ricky Council IV (10)	Tyrese Maxey (10)	Wells Fargo Center; 19,765	3–14
18	November 30	@ Detroit	W 111–96	Tyrese Maxey (28)	George, Yabusele (8)	Tyrese Maxey (6)	Little Caesars Arena; 22,062	4–14

December: 9–3 (home: 3–2; road: 6–1)

Game	Date	Team	Score	High points	High rebounds	High assists	Location Attendance	Record
19	December 3	@ Charlotte	W 110–104	Paul George (29)	Guerschon Yabusele (12)	Paul George (8)	Spectrum Center; 14,956	5–14
20	December 4	Orlando	L 102–106	Jared McCain (24)	McCain, Yabusele (7)	Tyrese Maxey (6)	Wells Fargo Center; 19,851	5–15
21	December 6	Orlando	W 102–94	Paul George (21)	Andre Drummond (11)	Paul George (9)	Wells Fargo Center; 19,802	6–15
22	December 8	@ Chicago	W 108–100	Joel Embiid (31)	Joel Embiid (12)	Tyrese Maxey (14)	United Center; 18,837	7–15
23	December 13	Indiana	L 107–121	Tyrese Maxey (22)	Kelly Oubre Jr. (13)	Joel Embiid (5)	Wells Fargo Center; 19,771	7–16
24	December 16	@ Charlotte	W 121–108	Tyrese Maxey (40)	Andre Drummond (15)	Paul George (8)	Spectrum Center; 14,677	8–16
25	December 20	Charlotte	W 108–98	Joel Embiid (34)	Paul George (10)	Joel Embiid (9)	Wells Fargo Center; 20,291	9–16
26	December 21	@ Cleveland	L 99–126	Tyrese Maxey (27)	Andre Drummond (8)	Martin, Maxey (3)	Rocket Mortgage FieldHouse; 19,432	9–17
27	December 23	San Antonio	W 111–106	Tyrese Maxey (32)	Tyrese Maxey (10)	Tyrese Maxey (8)	Wells Fargo Center; 19,986	10–17
28	December 25	@ Boston	W 118–114	Tyrese Maxey (33)	Joel Embiid (9)	Tyrese Maxey (12)	TD Garden; 19,156	11–17
29	December 28	@ Utah	W 114–111	Embiid, Maxey (32)	Guerschon Yabusele (8)	Tyrese Maxey (6)	Delta Center; 18,175	12–17
30	December 30	@ Portland	W 125–103	Joel Embiid (37)	Joel Embiid (9)	George, Jackson (4)	Moda Center; 16,721	13–17

January: 6–11 (home: 4–5; road: 2–6)

Game	Date	Team	Score	High points	High rebounds	High assists	Location Attendance	Record
31	January 1	@ Sacramento	L 107–113	Paul George (30)	Andre Drummond (9)	Tyrese Maxey (7)	Golden 1 Center; 16,024	13–18
32	January 2	@ Golden State	L 105–139	Joel Embiid (28)	Joel Embiid (14)	Tyrese Maxey (6)	Chase Center; 18,064	13–19
33	January 4	@ Brooklyn	W 123–94	Joel Embiid (28)	Joel Embiid (12)	Tyrese Maxey (7)	Barclays Center; 17,926	14–19
34	January 6	Phoenix	L 99–109	Tyrese Maxey (31)	Kelly Oubre Jr. (11)	Tyrese Maxey (10)	Wells Fargo Center; 19,791	14–20
35	January 8	Washington	W 109–103	Tyrese Maxey (29)	Guerschon Yabusele (8)	Tyrese Maxey (6)	Wells Fargo Center; 19,762	15–20
36	January 10	New Orleans	L 115–123	Tyrese Maxey (30)	Paul George (11)	Tyrese Maxey (12)	Wells Fargo Center; 19,779	15–21
37	January 12	@ Orlando	L 99–104	Tyrese Maxey (29)	Paul George (10)	Paul George (6)	Kia Center; 17,723	15–22
38	January 14	Oklahoma City	L 102–118	Justin Edwards (25)	Guerschon Yabusele (7)	Council IV, Edwards, Jackson, Yabusele (4)	Wells Fargo Center; 19,771	15–23
39	January 15	New York	L 119–125 (OT)	Tyrese Maxey (33)	Kelly Oubre Jr. (10)	George, Maxey, Yabusele (6)	Wells Fargo Center; 20,088	15–24
40	January 18	@ Indiana	L 102–115	Tyrese Maxey (28)	Ricky Council IV (9)	Jeff Dowtin (6)	Gainbridge Fieldhouse; 17,274	15–25
41	January 19	@ Milwaukee	L 109–123	Tyrese Maxey (37)	Bona, Maxey, Nance, Oubre Jr. (6)	Tyrese Maxey (7)	Fiserv Forum; 17,345	15–26
42	January 21	@ Denver	L 109–144	Tyrese Maxey (28)	Drummond, George (5)	Tyrese Maxey (10)	Ball Arena; 19,521	15–27
43	January 24	Cleveland	W 132–129	Paul George (30)	Oubre Jr., Yabusele (13)	Tyrese Maxey (7)	Wells Fargo Center; 19,760	16–27
44	January 25	@ Chicago	W 109–97	Tyrese Maxey (31)	Kelly Oubre Jr. (12)	Tyrese Maxey (9)	United Center; 20,153	17–27
45	January 28	L.A. Lakers	W 118–104	Tyrese Maxey (43)	Kelly Oubre Jr. (8)	Kelly Oubre Jr. (5)	Wells Fargo Center; 19,775	18–27
46	January 29	Sacramento	W 117–104	Tyrese Maxey (30)	Adem Bona (7)	Lowry, Maxey (8)	Wells Fargo Center; 19,770	19–27
47	January 31	Denver	L 134–137	Tyrese Maxey (42)	Oubre Jr., Yabusele (7)	Tyrese Maxey (9)	Wells Fargo Center; 19,764	19–28

February: 1–10 (home: 1–6; road: 0–4)

Game	Date	Team	Score	High points	High rebounds	High assists	Location Attendance	Record
48	February 2	Boston	L 110–118	Tyrese Maxey (34)	Kelly Oubre Jr. (13)	Ricky Council IV (8)	Wells Fargo Center; 19,766	19–29
49	February 4	Dallas	W 118–116	Tyrese Maxey (33)	Joel Embiid (11)	Tyrese Maxey (13)	Wells Fargo Center; 19,756	20–29
50	February 5	Miami	L 101–108	Tyrese Maxey (31)	Kelly Oubre Jr. (11)	Gordon, Maxey (5)	Wells Fargo Center; 19,770	20–30
51	February 7	@ Detroit	L 112–125	Tyrese Maxey (27)	Kelly Oubre Jr. (11)	Tyrese Maxey (7)	Little Caesars Arena; 19,241	20–31
52	February 9	@ Milwaukee	L 127–135	Tyrese Maxey (39)	Joel Embiid (12)	Embiid, George (6)	Fiserv Forum; 17,341	20–32
53	February 11	Toronto	L 103–106	Joel Embiid (27)	Joel Embiid (12)	Butler, Embiid, Grimes (4)	Wells Fargo Center; 19,767	20–33
54	February 12	@ Brooklyn	L 96–100	Grimes, Oubre Jr. (30)	Quentin Grimes (9)	Jared Butler (9)	Barclays Center; 16,133	20–34
All-Star Game
55	February 20	Boston	L 104–124	Paul George (17)	Guerschon Yabusele (8)	Tyrese Maxey (7)	Wells Fargo Center; 19,752	20–35
56	February 22	Brooklyn	L 103–105	Tyrese Maxey (31)	Guerschon Yabusele (8)	Embiid, Grimes, Maxey (5)	Wells Fargo Center; 20,431	20–36
57	February 24	Chicago	L 110–142	George, Oubre Jr. (19)	Drummond, Oubre Jr. (8)	Jared Butler (5)	Wells Fargo Center; 19,765	20–37
58	February 26	@ New York	L 105–110	Tyrese Maxey (30)	Andre Drummond (9)	Paul George (7)	Madison Square Garden; 19,812	20–38

March: 3–14 (home: 2–5; road: 1–9)

Game	Date	Team	Score	High points	High rebounds	High assists	Location Attendance	Record
59	March 1	Golden State	W 126–119	Quentin Grimes (44)	Andre Drummond (14)	Tyrese Maxey (11)	Wells Fargo Center; 20,159	21–38
60	March 3	Portland	L 102–119	Andre Drummond (25)	Andre Drummond (18)	Quentin Grimes (9)	Wells Fargo Center; 19,776	21–39
61	March 4	@ Minnesota	L 112–126	Quentin Grimes (30)	Drummond, George, Yabusele (7)	Paul George (6)	Target Center; 17,297	21–40
62	March 6	@ Boston	L 105–123	Kelly Oubre Jr. (27)	Andre Drummond (10)	Kelly Oubre Jr. (6)	TD Garden; 19,156	21–41
63	March 9	Utah	W 126–122	Grimes, Walker IV (25)	Adem Bona (15)	Jared Butler (9)	Wells Fargo Center; 19,757	22–41
64	March 10	@ Atlanta	L 123–132	Quentin Grimes (35)	Quentin Grimes (7)	Jared Butler (6)	State Farm Arena; 15,269	22–42
65	March 12	@ Toronto	L 105–118	Quentin Grimes (29)	Adem Bona (9)	Jared Butler (8)	Scotiabank Arena; 18,864	22–43
66	March 14	Indiana	L 100–112	Jeff Dowtin Jr. (24)	Guerschon Yabusele (15)	Butler, Dowtin Jr. (4)	Wells Fargo Center; 19,758	22–44
67	March 16	@ Dallas	W 130–125	Quentin Grimes (28)	Ricky Council IV (10)	Jared Butler (7)	American Airlines Center; 19,825	23–44
68	March 17	@ Houston	L 137–144 (OT)	Quentin Grimes (46)	Quentin Grimes (13)	Jared Butler (5)	Toyota Center; 16,648	23–45
69	March 19	@ Oklahoma City	L 100–133	Quentin Grimes (28)	Chuma Okeke (15)	Grimes, Hood-Schifino (5)	Paycom Center; 18,203	23–46
70	March 21	@ San Antonio	L 120–128	Edwards, Grimes (25)	Guerschon Yabusele (9)	Quentin Grimes (10)	Frost Bank Center; 17,803	23–47
71	March 23	@ Atlanta	L 119–132	Quentin Grimes (26)	Chuma Okeke (8)	Quentin Grimes (6)	State Farm Arena; 16,161	23–48
72	March 24	@ New Orleans	L 99–112	Butler, Edwards (19)	Chuma Okeke (9)	Council IV, Okeke, Yabusele (4)	Smoothie King Center; 16,987	23–49
73	March 26	Washington	L 114–119	Quentin Grimes (22)	Justin Edwards (10)	Butler, Grimes (4)	Wells Fargo Center; 19,770	23–50
74	March 29	Miami	L 95–118	Jared Butler (19)	Adem Bona (10)	Jared Butler (10)	Wells Fargo Center; 20,079	23–51
75	March 30	Toronto	L 109–127	Lonnie Walker IV (23)	Ricky Council IV (11)	Lonnie Walker IV (7)	Wells Fargo Center; 19,785	23–52

April: 1–6 (home: 0–4; road: 1–2)

Game	Date	Team	Score	High points	High rebounds	High assists	Location Attendance	Record
76	April 1	@ New York	L 91–105	Quentin Grimes (26)	Bagley, Bona (8)	Jared Butler (7)	Madison Square Garden; 19,314	23–53
77	April 3	Milwaukee	L 113–126	Adem Bona (28)	Justin Edwards (8)	Quentin Grimes (10)	Wells Fargo Center; 19,763	23–54
78	April 5	Minnesota	L 109–114	Quentin Grimes (28)	Adem Bona (10)	Jared Butler (8)	Wells Fargo Center; 19,755	23–55
79	April 7	@ Miami	L 105–117	Grimes, Walker IV (29)	Adem Bona (11)	Quentin Grimes (6)	Kaseya Center; 19,700	23–56
80	April 9	@ Washington	W 122–103	Jeff Dowtin Jr. (30)	Colin Castleton (14)	Quentin Grimes (7)	Capital One Arena; 17,222	24–56
81	April 11	Atlanta	L 110–124	Jared Butler (25)	Marcus Bagley (10)	Jared Butler (7)	Wells Fargo Center; 19,752	24–57
82	April 13	Chicago	L 102–122	Lonnie Walker IV (31)	Marcus Bagley (15)	Butler, Mobley (5)	Wells Fargo Center; 20,059	24–58

2024–25 season schedule

=== NBA Cup ===
The groups were revealed during the tournament announcement on July 12, 2024.

==== East Group A ====
Pos	Team	Pld	W	L	PF	PA	PD	Qualification
1	New York Knicks	4	4	0	455	425	+30	Advance to knockout stage
2	Orlando Magic	4	3	1	441	396	+45	Advance to knockout stage
3	Philadelphia 76ers	4	2	2	408	411	−3	
4	Brooklyn Nets	4	1	3	436	475	−39	
5	Charlotte Hornets	4	0	4	406	439	−33	

Source: NBA
Rules for classification: Tiebreakers

== Player statistics ==
Legend
GP	Games played	GS	Games started	MPG	Minutes per game
FG%	Field-goal percentage	3P%	3-point field-goal percentage	FT%	Free-throw percentage
RPG	Rebounds per game	APG	Assists per game	SPG	Steals per game
BPG	Blocks per game	PPG	Points per game

=== Regular season ===
Philadelphia 76ers statistics
Player	GP	GS	MPG	FG%	3P%	FT%	RPG	APG	SPG	BPG	PPG
Marcus Bagley	10	4	25.3	.391	.156	.800	7.0	1.0	.9	1.2	6.7
Adem Bona	58	11	15.6	.703	.000	.670	4.2	.5	.4	1.2	5.8
Oshae Brissett	6	2	23.7	.487	.333	.571	3.7	.7	.7	.5	8.7
Jared Butler^{†}	28	17	24.3	.426	.352	.870	2.5	4.9	1.1	.3	11.5
Colin Castleton^{†}	5	0	19.6	.500	.000	.667	7.4	2.0	.2	.2	6.0
Ricky Council IV	73	12	17.1	.382	.258	.804	2.9	1.3	.4	.2	7.3
Jeff Dowtin	41	3	15.1	.487	.400	.733	1.5	1.9	.6	.3	7.0
Andre Drummond	40	23	18.8	.500	.150	.622	7.8	.9	1.0	.5	7.3
Justin Edwards	44	26	26.4	.455	.363	.696	3.4	1.6	1.0	.4	10.1
Joel Embiid	19	19	30.2	.444	.299	.882	8.2	4.5	.7	.9	23.8
Paul George	41	41	32.5	.430	.358	.814	5.3	4.3	1.8	.5	16.2
Eric Gordon	39	13	19.7	.426	.409	.750	1.2	1.7	.7	.3	6.8
Quentin Grimes^{†}	28	25	33.7	.469	.373	.752	5.2	4.5	1.5	.4	21.9
Jalen Hood-Schifino ^{†}	13	0	23.1	.371	.304	.842	2.0	2.8	.4	.5	7.8
Reggie Jackson ^{†}	31	1	12.4	.391	.338	.778	1.4	1.5	.5	.1	4.4
Kyle Lowry	35	12	18.8	.350	.330	.818	1.9	2.7	.9	.3	3.9
Caleb Martin^{†}	31	24	30.4	.435	.379	.622	4.4	2.2	1.1	.6	9.1
Kenyon Martin Jr.^{†}	24	7	20.0	.616	.381	.828	3.0	.8	.5	.7	6.4
Tyrese Maxey	52	52	37.7	.437	.337	.879	3.3	6.1	1.8	.4	26.3
Jared McCain	23	8	25.7	.460	.383	.875	2.4	2.6	.7	.0	15.3
Isaiah Mobley	1	0	17.4	.286	.333	.500	4.0	5.0	1.0	1.0	6.0
Pete Nance^{†}	7	0	9.8	.333	.333	.500	1.4	.4	.1	.0	2.1
Chuma Okeke^{†}	7	3	24.5	.545	.455	.667	6.1	1.9	.7	.4	6.9
Kelly Oubre Jr.	60	57	34.6	.470	.293	.751	6.1	1.8	1.5	.5	15.1
Lester Quiñones^{†}	4	0	4.3	.500	.000	1.000	1.0	.3	.0	.0	2.3
Alex Reese^{†}	14	0	15.3	.472	.366	.750	3.3	.3	.7	.7	5.3
David Roddy^{†}	3	0	9.5	.421	.182		3.0	1.0	.7	.0	6.0
Lonnie Walker IV	20	7	23.9	.420	.354	.800	3.2	2.5	.5	.3	12.4
Phillip Wheeler	5	0	8.9	.143	.000	1.000	1.6	.4	.2	.4	1.6
Guerschon Yabusele	70	43	27.1	.501	.380	.725	5.6	2.1	.8	.3	11.0

- ^{†} Denotes player spent time with another team in the season. Stats reflect time with the 76ers only.

== Transactions ==
=== Trades ===
July 6, 2024	Six-team trade
July 6, 2024	To Philadelphia 76ers 2031 DAL second-round pick (from Golden State via Dallas)	To Charlotte Hornets Josh Green (from Dallas); Reggie Jackson (from Denver); 2029 DEN second-round pick (from Denver); 2030 DEN second-round pick (from Denver)
July 6, 2024	To Dallas Mavericks Klay Thompson (from Golden State); 2025 GSW second-round pick (from Golden State)	To Denver Nuggets Cash considerations (from Charlotte)
July 6, 2024	To Golden State Warriors Kyle Anderson (from Minnesota); Buddy Hield (from Philadelphia)	To Minnesota Timberwolves 2025 DEN second-round pick (from Golden State via Charlotte); 2031 second-round pick swap (from Golden State); Cash considerations (from Golden State)
February 4, 2025	To Philadelphia 76ers Quentin Grimes; 2025 second-round pick (Note: Philadelphia will receive the more favorable of its 2025 2nd round pick and Denver's 2025 2nd round pick and Phoenix will receive the less favorable of the two)	To Dallas Mavericks Caleb Martin
February 6, 2025	To Philadelphia 76ers Jared Butler; 2027 second-round pick (Note: More favorable of Golden State and Phoenix.); GSW second-round pick 2030 second-round pick (Note: More favorable of Phoenix and Portland.); 2030 WAS second-round pick	To Washington Wizards Reggie Jackson; 2026 first-round pick (Note: Oklahoma City will receive the two most / more favorable of its 2026 1st round pick, Houston's 2026 1st round pick protected for selections 1-4 and the L.A. Clippers' 2026 1st round pick and Washington will receive the least / less favorable of these; if the Houston pick falls within its protected range and is therefore not conveyed, then Houston will instead convey its 2026 2nd round pick to Oklahoma City.)
February 6, 2025	To Philadelphia 76ers Cash considerations	To Detroit Pistons Kenyon Martin Jr. 2027 MIL second-round pick 2031 DAL second-round pick

=== Free agency ===
==== Re-signed ====
Date	Player	Ref.
July 7	Tyrese Maxey	
July 7	Kelly Oubre Jr.	
July 12	Kyle Lowry	
July 15	Kenyon Martin Jr.	
July 22	Jeff Dowtin	

==== Additions ====
Date	Player	Former team	Ref.
July 4	Justin Edwards	Kentucky Wildcats	
July 6	Paul George	Los Angeles Clippers	
July 6	Caleb Martin	Miami Heat	
July 7	Andre Drummond	Chicago Bulls	
July 10	Eric Gordon	Phoenix Suns	
July 30	Reggie Jackson	Denver Nuggets	
August 29	Guerschon Yabusele	(Spain) Real Madrid	
September 26	Lester Quiñones	Golden State Warriors	

==== Subtractions ====
Date	Player	Reason left	New team	Ref.
July 6	Mo Bamba	Free agency	Los Angeles Clippers / San Diego Clippers / Birmingham Squadron / New Orleans Pelicans	
July 6	Paul Reed	Waived	Detroit Pistons	
July 8	Tobias Harris	Free agency	Detroit Pistons	
July 8	De'Anthony Melton	Free agency	Golden State Warriors / Brooklyn Nets	
July 10	Nicolas Batum	Free agency	Los Angeles Clippers	
July 15	Cameron Payne	Free agency	New York Knicks	
September 15	Terquavion Smith	Free agency	(China) Jiangsu Dragons / (Turkey) Darüşşafaka Lassa / Rip City Remix	
