= Tolu Smith =

American basketball player (born 2000)

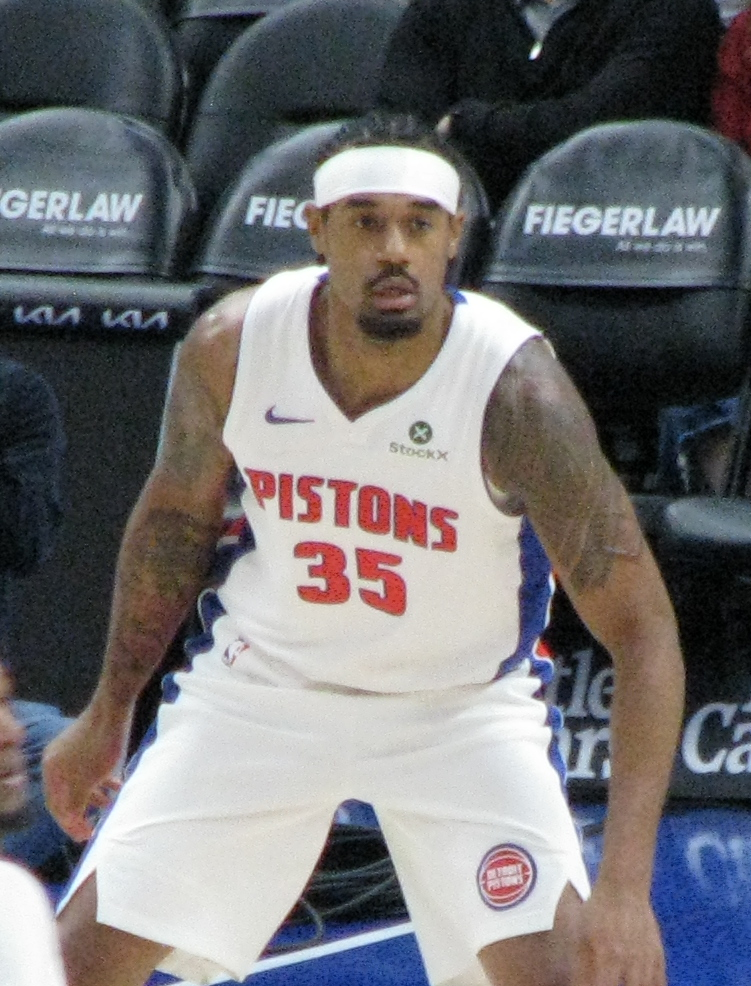
- Smith with the Detroit Pistons in 2026

No. 35 – Detroit Pistons
- Position: Power forward
- League: NBA

Personal information
- Born: July 26, 2000 (age 26) Bay St. Louis, Mississippi, U.S.
- Listed height: 6 ft 11 in (2.11 m)
- Listed weight: 245 lb (111 kg)

Career information
- High school: Bay (Bay St. Louis, Mississippi); Kahuku (Kahuku, Hawaii)
- College: Western Kentucky (2018–2019); Mississippi State (2020–2024)
- NBA draft: 2024: undrafted
- Playing career: 2024–present

Career history
- 2024–2025: Motor City Cruise
- 2025–present: Detroit Pistons
- 2025–2026: →Motor City Cruise

Career highlights
- 2× First-team All-SEC (2023, 2024)
- Stats at NBA.com
- Stats at Basketball Reference

Galen Edward Mitchell "Tolu" Smith III (born July 26, 2000) is an American professional basketball player for the Detroit Pistons of the National Basketball Association (NBA). He played college basketball for the Western Kentucky Hilltoppers and Mississippi State Bulldogs.

== High school career ==
Smith was raised in Bay St. Louis, Mississippi, and played basketball at Bay High School. He moved with his family to Hawaii in 2017 and enrolled at Kahuku High & Intermediate School in Kahuku for his senior season. He was selected as the Honolulu Star-Advertiser All-State player of the year in 2018.

== College career ==
Smith played his freshman season for the Western Kentucky Hilltoppers and averaged 3.3 points and 2.6 rebounds per game. He elected to transfer at the end of the season to join his home state Mississippi State Bulldogs. Smith sat out the 2019–20 season due to National Collegiate Athletic Association (NCAA) transfer rules.

Smith appeared in 30 games during his sophomore season but only started 20 during his junior season as he battled multiple injuries. He returned to full health for his senior season in 2022–23 and started all 34 games. Smith averaged 15.7 points with a league-leading 57.2% field goal percentage to earn first-team All-Southeastern Conference (SEC) honors. He declared for the 2023 NBA draft but returned to Mississippi State for his fifth year of collegiate eligibility. Smith averaged 15 points and 8 rebounds per game during the 2023–24 season and was named to the All-SEC first-team.

== Professional career ==
After going undrafted in the 2024 NBA draft, Smith joined the Detroit Pistons for the 2024 NBA Summer League and on September 17, 2024, he signed with the team. However, he was waived on October 17 and on October 29, he joined the Motor City Cruise. On January 6, 2025, he signed a two-way contract with the Pistons. On April 13, Smith made his NBA debut against the Milwaukee Bucks in the final game of the regular season and scored 14 points with 8 rebounds. He became the second Hawaii high school graduate to appear in an NBA game after Red Rocha who last played in 1957.

On April 7, 2026, the Pistons signed Smith to a two-year, standard contract.

== Career statistics ==
Legend
GP	Games played	GS	Games started	MPG	Minutes per game
FG%	Field goal percentage	3P%	3-point field goal percentage	FT%	Free throw percentage
RPG	Rebounds per game	APG	Assists per game	SPG	Steals per game
BPG	Blocks per game	PPG	Points per game	**Bold**	Career high

=== NBA ===
==== Regular season ====
Year	Team	GP	GS	MPG	FG%	3P%	FT%	RPG	APG	SPG	BPG	PPG
2024–25	Detroit	1	0	**22.0**	**.667**	—	**.667**	**8.0**	.0	.0	.0	**14.0**
2025–26	Detroit	**15**	0	9.1	.500	—	**.667**	3.3	**.9**	**.1**	**.4**	3.7
Career		16	0	9.9	.533	—	.667	3.6	.8	.1	.4	4.4

==== Playoffs ====
Year	Team	GP	GS	MPG	FG%	3P%	FT%	RPG	APG	SPG	BPG	PPG
2026	Detroit	3	0	2.3	1.000	—	—	.7	.0	.3	.0	1.3
Career		3	0	2.3	1.000	—	—	.7	.0	.3	.0	1.3

== Personal life ==
Smith was born to an African-American father and Samoan mother. His father, Galen, worked as a computer specialist for the Naval Oceanographic Office, and previously played college basketball in the United States Virgin Islands. Smith's mother, Shannel, played basketball for the South Alabama Jaguars. His older brother, Galen Jr., played basketball for the Xavier Gold Rush.

Smith's nickname, "Tolu", means "three" in Samoan as he was the third Galen in his family. He received his initials, G.E.M.S., because his parents considered him and his brother to be their "gems".
