= Jazian Gortman =

American basketball player (born 2003)

No. 00 – Capital City Go-Go
- Position: Point guard
- League: NBA G League

Personal information
- Born: March 14, 2003 (age 23) Columbia, South Carolina, U.S.
- Listed height: 6 ft 2 in (1.88 m)
- Listed weight: 184 lb (83 kg)

Career information
- High school: W. J. Keenan (Columbia, South Carolina)
- NBA draft: 2023: undrafted
- Playing career: 2022–present

Career history
- 2022–2023: YNG Dreamerz
- 2023–2024: Wisconsin Herd
- 2024: Rip City Remix
- 2024–2025: Dallas Mavericks
- 2024–2025: →Texas Legends
- 2025: Texas Legends
- 2025: Oklahoma City Blue
- 2026–present: Capital City Go-Go
- Stats at NBA.com
- Stats at Basketball Reference

Jazian Gortman (\JAY-zee-in GORT-min\; born March 14, 2003) is an American professional basketball player for the Capital City Go-Go of the NBA G League.

== High school career ==
Gortman attended W. J. Keenan in Columbia, South Carolina where he averaged 23.1 points, 5.8 rebounds, and 3.3 steals per outing, being considered a 5-star prospect. However, before his senior season, he decided to leave high school and turn pro.

== Professional career ==
=== YNG Dreamerz (2022–2023) ===
On August 11, 2021, Gortman signed with the YNG Dreamerz of the Overtime Elite ahead of the 2022–2023 season. In his first season as a pro, he averaged 13.9 points, 3.9 assists, 4.8 rebounds, and 2.5 steals per game.

=== Wisconsin Herd (2023–2024) ===
After going undrafted in the 2023 NBA draft, Gortman joined the Milwaukee Bucks for the 2023 NBA Summer League and on July 15, he signed with them. However, he was waived on October 18 and twelve days later, he joined the Wisconsin Herd. In 18 games, he averaged 6.9 points, 2.1 rebounds and 2.5 assists in 14.7 minutes.

=== Rip City Remix (2024) ===
On January 12, 2024, Gortman was traded to the Rip City Remix for Malachi Smith, playing in 23 games and averaging 10.5 points, 2.7 rebounds and 4.2 assists in 21.2 minutes.

=== Dallas Mavericks / Texas Legends (2024–2025) ===
On July 12, 2024, Gortman signed with the Dallas Mavericks, joined them for the 2024 NBA Summer League and on October 18, his deal was converted into a two-way contract. After his contract conversion. Gortman appeared in 16 games for the Mavericks averaging 1.5 points. On January 26, 2025, Gortman was waived by the Mavericks and three days later, joined the Texas Legends.

=== Oklahoma City / Oklahoma City Blue (2025) ===
On Friday, September 26, 2025, the Oklahoma City Blue acquired the rights to Gortman in exchange for a 2026 first-round pick and a 2026 second-round pick. On October 6, Gortman made his pre-season debut against his former team, the Dallas Mavericks, where he scored 12 points, along with four rebounds, and two assists. On October 11, Gortman was waived by the Thunder.

== Career statistics ==
Legend
GP	Games played	GS	Games started	MPG	Minutes per game
FG%	Field goal percentage	3P%	3-point field goal percentage	FT%	Free throw percentage
RPG	Rebounds per game	APG	Assists per game	SPG	Steals per game
BPG	Blocks per game	PPG	Points per game	**Bold**	Career high

=== NBA ===
==== Regular season ====
Year	Team	GP	GS	MPG	FG%	3P%	FT%	RPG	APG	SPG	BPG	PPG
2024–25	Dallas	16	0	3.5	.391	.364	.500	.3	.4	.1	.1	1.5
Career		16	0	3.5	.391	.364	.500	.3	.4	.1	.1	1.5
