= John Stephens (1920s pitcher) =

American baseball player

- Pitcher
- Born: September 27, 1897; Springettsbury Township, Pennsylvania, U.S.
- Died: March 2, 1991 (aged 93); York, Pennsylvania, U.S.
- Threw: Left

Negro league baseball debut
- 1921, for the Indianapolis ABCs

Last appearance
- 1921, for the Indianapolis ABCs

Teams
- Indianapolis ABCs (1921)

John Samuel Stephens (September 27, 1897 – March 2, 1991) was an American Negro league pitcher in the 1920s.

A native of Springettsbury Township, Pennsylvania, Stephens was the brother of fellow Negro leaguer Jake Stephens. Older brother John played for the Indianapolis ABCs in 1921. Stephens died in York, Pennsylvania in 1991 at age 93.
