= Jake Stephens =

American baseball player (1900–1981)

- Shortstop
- Born: February 10, 1900; Springettsbury Township, Pennsylvania, U.S.
- Died: February 5, 1981 (aged 80); York, Pennsylvania, U.S.
- Batted: Right Threw: Right

Negro leagues debut
- 1921, for the Hilldale Daisies

Last appearance
- 1937, for the New York Black Yankees
- Stats at Baseball Reference

Teams
- Hilldale Daisies (1921–1929); Homestead Grays (1929–1932); Philadelphia Stars (1933–1935); New York Black Yankees (1936–1937)

Career highlights and awards
- All-Star (1935); 2× Eastern Colored League champion (1923, 1924)

Paul Eugene "Country Jake" Stephens (February 10, 1900 – February 5, 1981) was an American professional baseball player known for his slight stature, speed, and defense at the shortstop position. He played in the Negro leagues for four teams (1921–1937).

== Early years ==
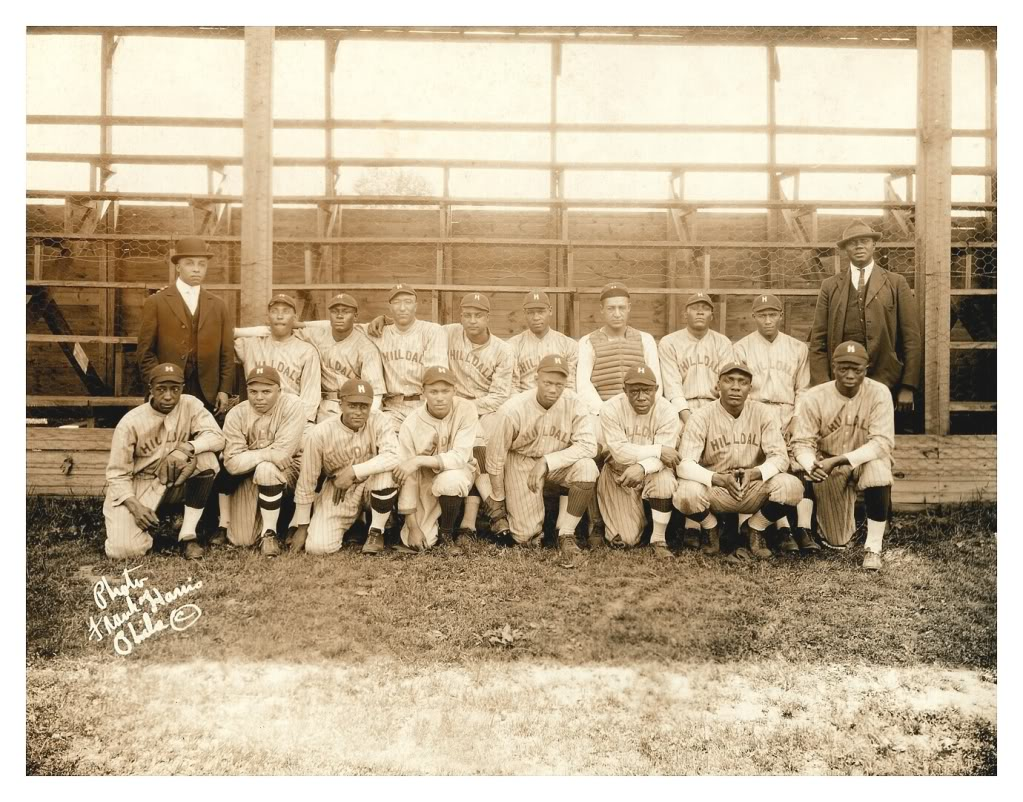
The Hilldale Club in 1921

The younger brother of fellow Negro leaguer Frank Stephens, Stephens broke into professional black baseball by sending a telegram to Ed Bolden, owner of the Hilldale Daisies about a great young prospect (Stephens) in York, Pennsylvania, who happened to be Stephens. Bolden signed Stephens in 1921. He hit .263 against all levels of competition before returning to semipro ball. He spent part of 1922 in semipro ball and some with Hilldale, batting .290. In 1923, Stephens saw more playing time, backing up John Henry Lloyd at shortstop and Judy Johnson at third base.

== Eastern Colored League ==
In 1924, Stephens hit .183 (19 for 104) as a reserve shortstop. He asked to be taken out of game 8 of the 1924 Negro World Series; because he felt too nervous. With Stephens on the bench, catcher Biz Mackey moved to third base and Judy Johnson moved to shortstop. Unfortunately, Mackey committed a crucial error in game 8 that cost Hilldale the game and eventually the series. The Kansas City Monarchs won the series, the first Negro World Series ever played.

In 1925, Frank Warfield, the Hilldale manager, inserted Stephens at shortstop permanently. He hit .229 but played sufficient defense to help the Daisies to their third consecutive pennant and a victory in the Negro World Series against the 1924 champion Monarchs. Over the next three seasons with the Daisies, Stephens hit an average .229. In 1928, Hilldale traded Country Jake to the Homestead Grays. Stephens and Rev Cannady were sent to Homestead in exchange for George Britt and Martin Dihigo. Stephens left the Grays and returned to play for Hilldale, but later left the Daisies as well.

In 1930 and 1931, Stephens played for the Homestead Grays. The 1931 Grays are considered one of the best Negro league teams ever to play, compiling 136 wins and losing only 17. Stephens played alongside Jud Wilson at third base and George Scales at second base. The Grays also sported sluggers Josh Gibson, Chaney White and Oscar Charleston. The team's pitching staff included Smokey Joe Williams, Willie Foster, Double Duty Radcliffe, and Lefty Williams. In 1930, he hit .349 for the Grays but managed only a meager .168 batting average in the 1931 season.

In 1932, Stephens joined the Pittsburgh Crawfords, playing alongside Josh Gibson and Satchel Paige. Known mostly for his defense, Stephens hit for a low average but proved his worth defensively, turning acrobatic double plays.

== Philadelphia and New York ==
In 1934 Stephens joined the Philadelphia Stars. He joined Stars second baseman Dick Seay as the best double play combination in the league. Following the 1934 season, Cum Posey selected Stephens to the annual All-star team, an honor bestowed upon him the following season as well.

Stephens spent the 1936 and 1937 seasons with the New York Black Yankees, hitting .169 and .222 in 1936 and 1937 respectively. Although he received an offer to play for the Atlanta Black Crackers, Stephens turned them down and retired from baseball after 17 seasons in professional baseball.

== Later life ==
Stephens moved back to York, Pennsylvania, running a taproom for two years. From 1939 to 1955, he worked for the Pennsylvania Bureau of Motor Vehicles. Stephens also worked as a part-time deputy sheriff. He is a member of the Pittsburgh and York, Pennsylvania sports halls of fame. Stephens died in 1981 and is buried in York, Pennsylvania.
