= Jeff Dowtin Jr. =

American basketball player (born 1997)

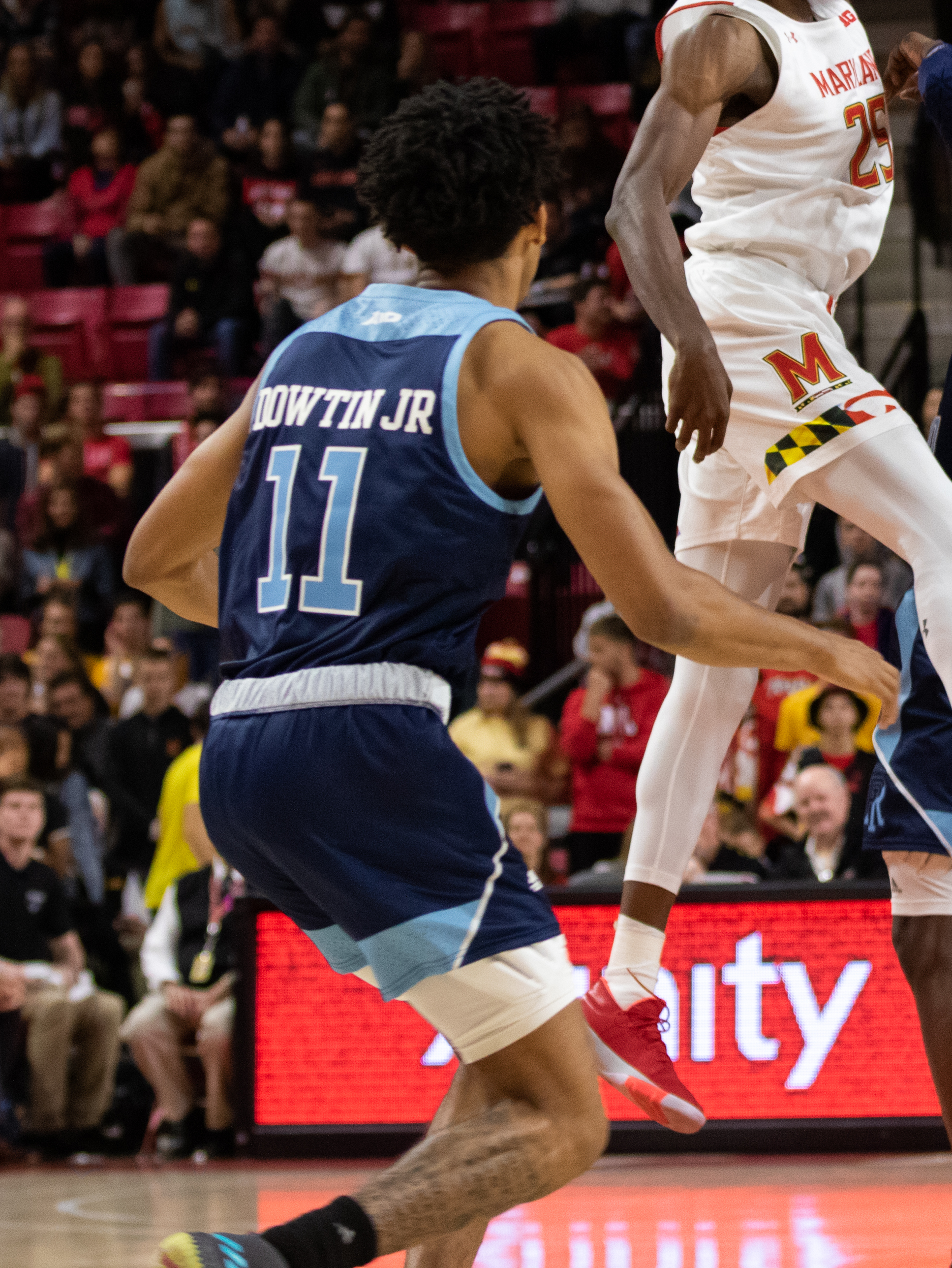
- Dowtin with Rhode Island in 2019

No. 3 – Napoli Basket
- Position: Point guard
- League: LBA; EuroCup

Personal information
- Born: May 10, 1997 (age 29) Upper Marlboro, Maryland, U.S.
- Listed height: 6 ft 3 in (1.91 m)
- Listed weight: 177 lb (80 kg)

Career information
- High school: St. John's College HS (Washington, D.C.)
- College: Rhode Island (2016–2020)
- NBA draft: 2020: undrafted
- Playing career: 2021–present

Career history
- 2021: Lakeland Magic
- 2021: Golden State Warriors
- 2021: →Santa Cruz Warriors
- 2022: Milwaukee Bucks
- 2022: →Wisconsin Herd
- 2022: Lakeland Magic
- 2022: Orlando Magic
- 2022–2023: Toronto Raptors
- 2022–2023: →Raptors 905
- 2023–2024: Delaware Blue Coats
- 2024–2025: Philadelphia 76ers
- 2024–2025: →Delaware Blue Coats
- 2025–2026: Maccabi Tel Aviv
- 2026–present: Napoli

Career highlights
- NBA G League champion (2021); Third-team All-Atlantic 10 (2020); Atlantic 10 All-Rookie Team (2017)
- Stats at NBA.com
- Stats at Basketball Reference

Jeffrey Lee Dowtin Jr. (born May 10, 1997) is an American professional basketball player for Napoli of the Italian Lega Basket Serie A (LBA) and the EuroCup. He played college basketball for the Rhode Island Rams.

== High school career ==
Dowtin attended St. John's College, where he averaged 15.3 points and five assists per game as a senior, leading the Cadets to a 29–5 record, including a 16–2 mark in the Washington Catholic Athletic Conference, and was named to the 2015–16 Washington Post All-Met Second Team while also earning All-DCSAA and All-WCAC honors. In 2016, he was identified as a three-star recruit by Scout, Rivals, and ESPN and was ranked the #43 point guard in the nation by ESPN and the 21st-best combo guard by 247Sports.

== College career ==
Dowtin played college basketball for Rhode Island, where he appeared in 128 games and averaged 11 points, 2.8 rebounds, 3.7 assists, and 1 steal, while shooting 44.7% from the field and 36.1% from behind the 3-point line. Dowtin also helped lead the Rams to two NCAA tournament appearances, in 2017 and 2018. As a senior, he averaged 13.9 points, 3.5 rebounds, and 3.2 assists, earning a spot in the All-Atlantic 10 third team.

== Professional career ==
=== Lakeland Magic (2021) ===
After going undrafted in the 2020 NBA draft, Dowtin signed on December 19, 2020, an Exhibit 10 deal with the Orlando Magic and was waived the same day. On January 24, 2021, he signed as an affiliate player with the Lakeland Magic of the NBA G League, where he played 15 games and averaged 6.5 points, 1.6 rebounds and 2.5 assists in 19.8 minutes. Lakeland ended up winning the G League championship against the Delaware Blue Coats, with Dowtin scoring eight points from the bench.

=== Golden State Warriors (2021–2022) ===
On September 8, 2021, Dowtin signed with the Orlando Magic. However, he was waived at the end of training camp. On October 18, he was claimed off waivers by the Golden State Warriors, later turning his deal into a two-way contract with the Santa Cruz Warriors. Dowtin made four appearances for Golden State, recording averages of 1.5 points and 1.8 rebounds. On January 2, 2022, he was waived by the Warriors.

=== Milwaukee Bucks (2022) ===
On January 7, 2022, Dowtin signed a 10-day contract with the Milwaukee Bucks. On January 12, he was assigned to the Wisconsin Herd of the G League following one appearance for the Bucks. Dowtin played three minutes in his only game for Milwaukee, missing his only shot attempt.

=== Orlando / Lakeland Magic (2022) ===
On January 19, 2022, Dowtin was reacquired by the Lakeland Magic. He was removed from the team on January 28, but was re-acquired on February 1.

On March 22, 2022, Dowtin signed a 10-day contract with the Orlando Magic. He played in four games for the Magic, averaging 3.3 points, 2.8 rebounds, and 1.8 assists. On April 1, Dowtin was re-acquired by Lakeland.

=== Toronto Raptors (2022–2023) ===
Dowtin joined the Toronto Raptors for the 2022 NBA Summer League. On July 19, 2022, Dowtin signed a two-way contract with the Raptors. Dowtin made 25 appearances for Toronto during the 2022–23 NBA season, recording averages of 2.4 points, 0.9 rebounds, and 1.2 assists. On July 22, 2023, he signed a standard contract with the Raptors, but was waived on October 20.

=== Philadelphia 76ers / Delaware Blue Coats (2023–2025) ===
On November 2, 2023, Dowtin joined the Delaware Blue Coats and on March 2, 2024, he signed a two-way contract with the Philadelphia 76ers. On April 4, he signed a standard contract with the 76ers. Dowtin played in 12 games for Philadelphia in the 2023–24 season, averaging 4.3 points, 1.7 rebounds, and 2.3 assists.

On July 22, 2024, Dowtin signed another two-way contract with the Sixers. On April 9, 2025, Dowtin scored a career-high 30 points in a 122-103 victory over the Washington Wizards. He made 41 appearances (including three starts) for Philadelphia during the 2024–25 season, recording averages of 7.0 points, 1.5 rebounds, and 1.9 assists.

=== Maccabi Tel Aviv (2025–2026) ===
On August 5, 2025, Dowtin signed a three-year contract with Maccabi Tel Aviv of the Israeli Israeli Basketball Premier League and the EuroLeague. On May 12, 2026, the team agreed to part ways with Dowtin.

=== Napoli Basket (2026–present) ===
On July 19, 2026, Dowtin signed with Napoli of the Italian Lega Basket Serie A (LBA).

== Career statistics ==
Legend
GP	Games played	GS	Games started	MPG	Minutes per game
FG%	Field goal percentage	3P%	3-point field goal percentage	FT%	Free throw percentage
RPG	Rebounds per game	APG	Assists per game	SPG	Steals per game
BPG	Blocks per game	PPG	Points per game	**Bold**	Career high

=== NBA ===
Year	Team	GP	GS	MPG	FG%	3P%	FT%	RPG	APG	SPG	BPG	PPG
2021–22	Golden State	4	0	6.9	.500	.000	—	1.8	.8	.0	**.3**	1.5
2021–22	Milwaukee	1	0	3.0	.000	.000	—	.0	.0	.0	.0	.0
2021–22	Orlando	4	0	**19.3**	.263	.143	**1.000**	**2.8**	1.8	**1.3**	.0	3.3
2022–23	Toronto	25	0	10.3	.439	.313	.667	.9	1.2	.4	.1	2.4
2023–24	Philadelphia	12	0	11.8	**.556**	**.474**	.750	1.7	**2.3**	.6	.1	4.3
2024–25	Philadelphia	**41**	**3**	15.1	.487	.400	.733	1.5	1.9	.6	**.3**	**7.0**
Career		87	3	13.0	.473	.377	.733	1.4	1.7	.5	.2	4.8

=== College ===
Year	Team	GP	GS	MPG	FG%	3P%	FT%	RPG	APG	SPG	BPG	PPG
2016–17	Rhode Island	32	19	22.2	.418	.351	.571	1.5	2.2	.5	.2	5.5
2017–18	Rhode Island	**34**	**33**	32.9	.446	**.387**	.709	3.1	**5.6**	.9	**.5**	9.6
2018–19	Rhode Island	33	**33**	**36.6**	**.475**	.354	.745	3.4	3.7	**1.4**	**.5**	**15.3**
2019–20	Rhode Island	29	29	35.6	.429	.360	**.757**	**3.5**	3.2	1.3	.3	13.9
Career		128	114	31.8	.447	.361	.715	2.9	3.7	1.0	.4	11.0

== Personal life ==
He is the son of Lesa and Jeffrey Dowtin Sr. and has a sister, Jeleisa.
