= Jaelen House =

American basketball player (born 2001)

No. 10 – Salt Lake City Stars
- Position: Point guard
- League: NBA G League

Personal information
- Born: May 2, 2001 (age 25) Phoenix, Arizona, U.S.
- Listed height: 6 ft 0 in (1.83 m)
- Listed weight: 170 lb (77 kg)

Career information
- High school: Shadow Mountain (Phoenix, Arizona)
- College: Arizona State (2019–2021); New Mexico (2021–2024)
- NBA draft: 2024: undrafted
- Playing career: 2024–present

Career history
- 2024–2026: San Diego Clippers
- 2026: Beijing Royal Fighters
- 2026: Vancouver Bandits
- 2026–present: Salt Lake City Stars

Career highlights
- MW Defensive Player of the Year (2024); First-team All-MW (2023); Second-team All-MW (2024); Third-team All-MW (2022); 2× MW All-Defensive Team (2023, 2024); Mountain West tournament MVP (2024)
- Stats at NBA.com
- Stats at Basketball Reference

Jaelen Edward House (born May 2, 2001) is an American professional basketball player for the Salt Lake City Stars of the NBA G League. He played college basketball for the Arizona State Sun Devils and New Mexico Lobos. He is the son of Eddie House.

== High school career ==
House attended Shadow Mountain High School in Phoenix, Arizona, where he was coached by his uncle, former NBA point guard Mike Bibby. House was ranked as a four-star recruit by 247Sports and the No. 12 point guard in the class of 2019. As a senior, he averaged 21.6 points and 5.3 assists per game.

== College career ==
House began his college career playing for the Arizona State Sun Devils in 2019. In two seasons with the Sun Devils, he played 51 games while averaging 4.5 points and 1.3 assists per game. After the season on March 16, 2021, House entered the NCAA Transfer Portal. On April 15, 2021, he committed to New Mexico.

In his first game with the Lobos during the 2021–22 season, he scored 30 points vs. FAU, the second most points by a Lobo in their debut. House averaged 16.9 points, 4.5 assists, and 2.2 steals per game. House was a 3rd Team All-Mountain West selection.

During his senior season House averaged 16.9 points, 4.7 assists, and 2.7 assists per game. He set the New Mexico single-season record with 86 steals, ranking second in the nation. House was a 2nd Team All-Mountain West selection and MW All-Defensive Team.

As a graduate student during the 2023–24 season, House averaged 15.9 points, 3.5 assists, and 2.3 steals per game. House's style of play was creative, emotional and controversial. His coach Richard Pitino described him as a performer, stating that he is going to do things in an unconventional manner but always compete for the team. House was a 3rd Team All-Mountain West selection, on the MW All-Defensive Team, and named Third-Team Academic All-American. House led the Lobos to a MW Tournament Championship, defeating San Diego State 68–61 to clinch its first title since 2014. House scored 28 points in the contest.

== Professional career ==
=== San Diego Clippers (2024—2026) ===
House went unselected in the 2024 NBA draft. After the draft, House played in the NBA Summer League with the Boston Celtics. On November 8, 2024, House signed with the San Diego Clippers of the NBA G League. In his rookie year (2024–25), he averaged 8.5 points, 2.9 assists, and 1.1 steals per game. On March 6, the San Diego Clippers deactivated House.

On October 24, 2025, House returned to the San Diego Clippers. In 32 appearances for San Diego, House averaged 17.3 points, 6.2 assists, and 1.6 steals per game. On February 27, 2026, House was released from the Clippers.

=== Beijing Royal Fighters (2026) ===
On March 11, 2026, House signed with Beijing Royal Fighters of the Chinese Basketball Association (CBA).

=== Vancouver Bandits (2026) ===
On May 12, 2026, House signed with the Vancouver Bandits of the Canadian Elite Basketball League (CEBL). He was released by Vancouver on June 27.
