= Ricky Council IV =

American basketball player (born 2001)

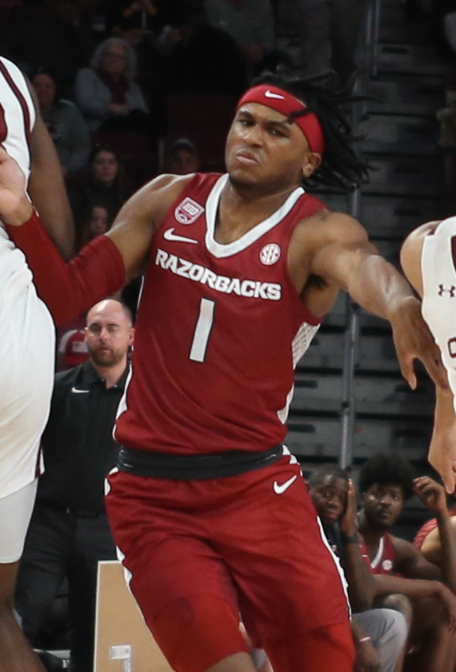
- Council with Arkansas in 2023

No. 14 – Osceola Magic
- Position: Shooting guard
- League: NBA G League

Personal information
- Born: August 3, 2001 (age 25) Durham, North Carolina, U.S.
- Listed height: 6 ft 6 in (1.98 m)
- Listed weight: 207 lb (94 kg)

Career information
- High school: Southern Durham (Durham, North Carolina)
- College: Wichita State (2020–2022); Arkansas (2022–2023)
- NBA draft: 2023: undrafted
- Playing career: 2023–present

Career history
- 2023–2025: Philadelphia 76ers
- 2023–2025: →Delaware Blue Coats
- 2025–2026: Rio Grande Valley Vipers
- 2026–present: Osceola Magic

Career highlights
- Second-team All-SEC (2023); AAC Sixth Man of the Year (2022); AAC All-Freshman team (2021)
- Stats at NBA.com
- Stats at Basketball Reference

Ricky Nickardo Council IV (born August 3, 2001) is an American professional basketball player for the Osceola Magic of the NBA G League. He played college basketball for the Wichita State Shockers and the Arkansas Razorbacks.

== Early life ==
Council grew up in Durham, North Carolina and attended Southern School of Energy and Sustainability. He was named third-team All-State as a senior after averaging 23 points, 9.5 rebounds, and five assists per game. Council was rated a three-star recruit and committed to playing college basketball for Wichita State over offers from Rice, Appalachian State, Elon, Hofstra, UMBC, Georgia Southern, Siena, James Madison, and Coastal Carolina.

== College career ==
Council began his college career at Wichita State. He averaged 7.1 points and 3.4 rebounds over 21 games and was named to the American Athletic Conference (AAC) All-Freshman team. As a sophomore, Council played in all 28 of the Shockers' games with seven starts and averaged 12 points, 5.4 rebounds, and 1.1 steals per game and was named the AAC Sixth Man of the Year. Following the end of the season, he initially declared for the 2022 NBA draft. Council withdrew his name from the draft and entered the NCAA transfer portal.

Council committed to transfer to Arkansas over offers from Kansas, Alabama, Georgia Tech, Mississippi State and Iowa State. He was named second team All-Southeastern Conference (SEC) at the end of his junior season. Council averaged 16.1 points, 3.6 rebounds, 2.3 assists, and 1.1 steals per game. After the conclusion of the 2023 NCAA tournament, he announced that he would forgo the remainder of his college eligibility and enter the 2023 NBA draft.

== Professional career ==
=== Philadelphia 76ers / Delaware Blue Coats (2023–2025) ===
After going undrafted in the 2023 NBA draft, Council signed a two-way contract with the Philadelphia 76ers on July 1, 2023. Council was waived on October 20, but signed a new two-way contract with the team on October 25.

On January 2, 2024, Council made his NBA debut for the 76ers in a 110–97 win over the Chicago Bulls. and on February 10, he had a career-high 19 points and 10 rebounds against the Washington Wizards. On April 13, he signed a standard contract with the 76ers.

On January 26, 2025, Council was shortly assigned to the Delaware Blue Coats. He made 73 appearances (12 starts) for Philadelphia during the 2024–25 NBA season, averaging 7.3 points, 2.9 rebounds, and 1.3 assists. On July 25, Council was waived by the 76ers.

=== Rio Grande Valley Vipers (2025–2026) ===
On October 18, 2025, Council signed with the Houston Rockets, but was waived shortly after. On October 27, he signed with the Rio Grande Valley Vipers of the NBA G League.

=== Osceola Magic (2026–present) ===
On September 23, 2026, Council signed an Exhibit 10 contract with the Orlando Magic, but was waived by the team the same day.

== Career statistics ==
Legend
GP	Games played	GS	Games started	MPG	Minutes per game
FG%	Field goal percentage	3P%	3-point field goal percentage	FT%	Free throw percentage
RPG	Rebounds per game	APG	Assists per game	SPG	Steals per game
BPG	Blocks per game	PPG	Points per game	**Bold**	Career high

=== NBA ===
Year	Team	GP	GS	MPG	FG%	3P%	FT%	RPG	APG	SPG	BPG	PPG
2023–24	Philadelphia	32	0	9.0	**.482**	**.375**	.746	1.4	.5	.3	.0	5.4
2024–25	Philadelphia	**73**	**12**	**17.1**	.382	.258	**.804**	**2.9**	**1.3**	**.4**	**.2**	**7.3**
Career		105	12	14.7	.402	.273	.786	2.5	1.1	.4	.1	6.7

=== College ===
Year	Team	GP	GS	MPG	FG%	3P%	FT%	RPG	APG	SPG	BPG	PPG
2020–21	Wichita State	21	1	15.6	.421	**.444**	.636	3.4	1.0	.3	.1	7.1
2021–22	Wichita State	28	7	26.6	**.437**	.306	**.849**	**5.4**	1.6	**1.1**	**.5**	12.0
2022–23	Arkansas	**36**	**29**	**34.1**	.433	.270	.794	3.6	**2.3**	**1.1**	.3	**16.1**
Career		85	37	27.1	.432	.303	.786	4.2	1.7	.9	.3	12.5

== Personal life ==
Council's two older brothers are also named after his father, Ricky Council. Both Ricky Council II and Ricky Council III also played college basketball.
